= Timeline of the 1992 Pacific hurricane season =

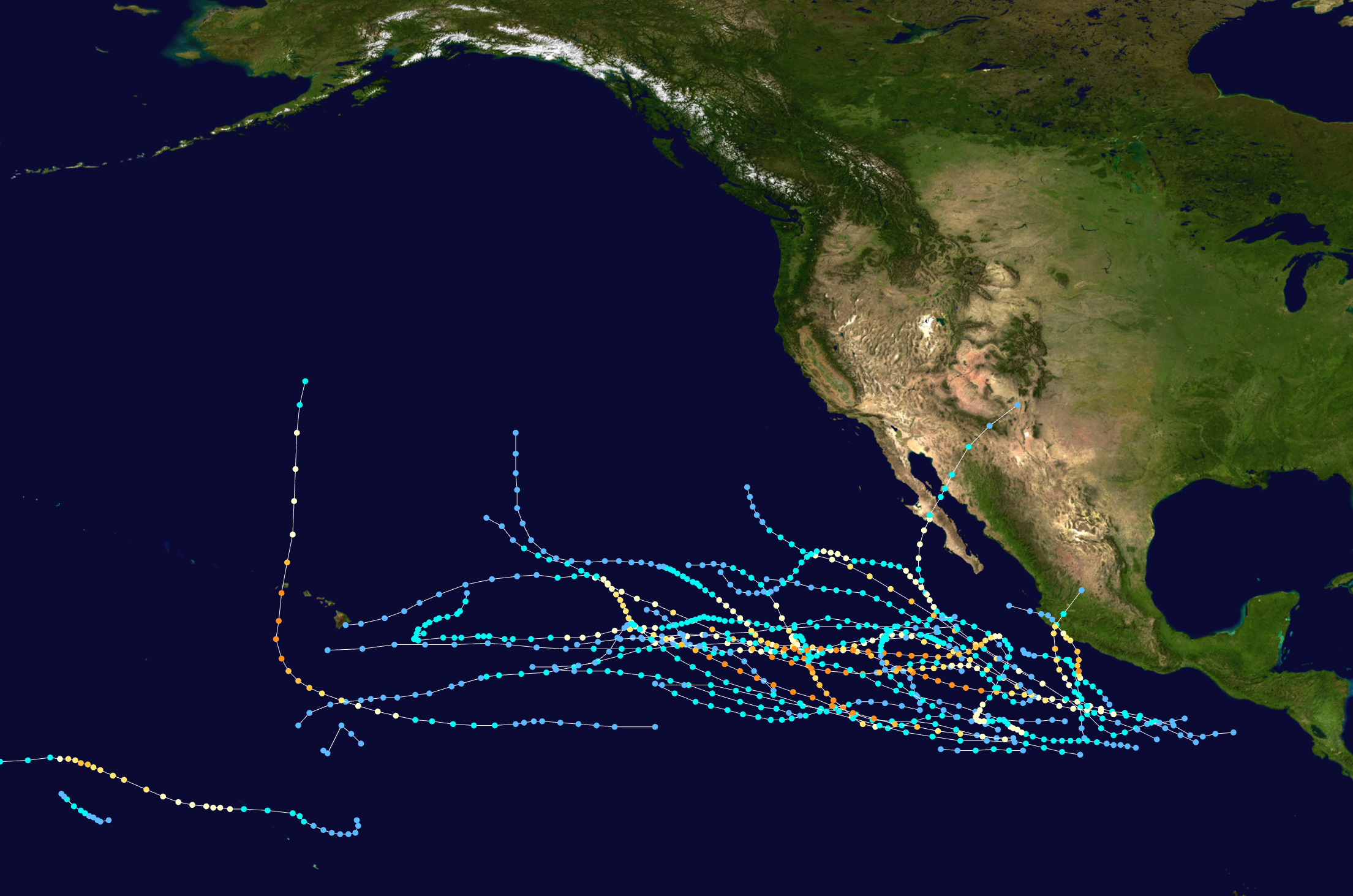
- Season summary map

Season boundaries
- First system formed: January 28, 1992
- Last system dissipated: November 23, 1992

Strongest system
- Name: Tina
- Maximum winds: 150 mph (240 km/h) (1-minute sustained)
- Lowest pressure: 932 mbar (hPa; 27.52 inHg)

Longest lasting system
- Name: Tina
- Duration: 24 days
Storm articles
- Hurricane Lester (1992)
- Hurricane Iniki
- Hurricane Winifred

The 1992 Pacific hurricane season—the annual cycle of tropical cyclone formation over the Pacific Ocean north of the equator and east of the International Date Line (IDL)—was the most active Pacific hurricane season on record. It officially began on May 15 in the Eastern Pacific basin proper (east of 140°W) and June 1 in the Central Pacific basin (140°W to the IDL); it ended on November 30 in both areas. Historically, this is the period during which most tropical cyclogenesis occurs in these respective areas. However, tropical cyclones can form at any time of the year, as evidenced by the formation of Hurricane Ekeka on January 28. Tropical cyclone activity concluded on November 23 with the dissipation of Tropical Depression Three-C.

The season produced 27 named tropical storms, (Note: During the period from 1991 to 2020, an average Pacific hurricane season generated 15 tropical storms, eight hurricanes, and four major hurricanes.) of which a record-tying 16 became hurricanes. A then-record 10 became major hurricanes by reaching Category 3 status or higher on the five-level Saffir–Simpson scale, with maximum sustained winds of at least 111 mph (179 km/h). One of these was Hurricane Tina, which at the time was the longest-lived Pacific tropical cyclone north of the equator. A total of 11 tropical cyclones either formed in the Central Pacific or crossed 140°W from the east. Three storms were named there, two of which became major hurricanes. These included Hurricane Iniki, which became the strongest hurricane in the history of Hawaii when it struck the island of Kauaʻi at Category 4 intensity, inflicting widespread destruction and killing several people. In addition to Iniki, three other systems made landfall, all as hurricanes and all in Mexico: Lester, Virgil, and Winifred.

This timeline documents tropical cyclone formations, strengthenings, weakenings, landfalls, extratropical transitions, and dissipations during the season. It includes information that was not released during the season, meaning that data from post-storm reviews by the National Hurricane Center (NHC) and the Central Pacific Hurricane Center (CPHC) has been included.

The timestamp for each event is first stated using Coordinated Universal Time (UTC), the 24-hour clock where 00:00 = midnight UTC. The NHC uses both UTC and the time zone where the center of the tropical cyclone was then located. Prior to 2015, two time zones were utilized in the Eastern Pacific basin: Pacific for the Eastern Pacific, and Hawaii−Aleutian for the Central Pacific. In this timeline, the respective area time is included in parentheses. Additionally, figures for maximum sustained winds and position estimates are rounded to the nearest 5 units (miles, or kilometers), following NHC practice. Direct wind observations are rounded to the nearest whole number. Atmospheric pressures are listed to the nearest millibar and nearest hundredth of an inch of mercury.

== Timeline of events ==
=== January ===
January 28

- 06:00 UTC (8:00 p.m. HST, January 27) at 4.5°N 157.0°W (Note: The Northeast and North Central Pacific hurricane database (HURDAT) places Tropical Depression One-C—future Hurricane Ekeka—at 4.5°N 156.8°W, or 185 mi (295 km) east-northeast of Tabuaeran.) – Tropical Depression One-C forms from a large area of unsettled weather about 165 mi (270 km) east-northeast of Tabuaeran. (Note: HURDAT initiates Tropical Depression One-C at 18:00 UTC (8:00 a.m. HST) on January 26 at 5.2°N 154.4°W, or about 355 mi (575 km) east-northeast of Tabuaeran.)
- 18:00 UTC (8:00 a.m. HST) at 5.2°N 158.0°W (Note: HURDAT places Tropical Storm Ekeka at 5.1°N 158.2°W, or about 115 mi (185 km) northeast of Tabuaeran.) – Tropical Depression One-C strengthens into Tropical Storm Ekeka about 130 mi (215 km) northeast of Tabuaeran.

January 30

- 00:00 UTC (2:00 p.m. HST, January 29) at 6.0°N 163.5°W – Tropical Storm Ekeka strengthens into a Category 1 hurricane on the Saffir–Simpson scale about 320 mi (520 km) west-northwest of Tabuaeran.

January 31

- 18:00 UTC (8:00 a.m. HST) at 7.4°N 169.5°W – Hurricane Ekeka strengthens to Category 2 intensity about 645 mi (1,035 km) south of Johnston Atoll.

=== February ===
February 2

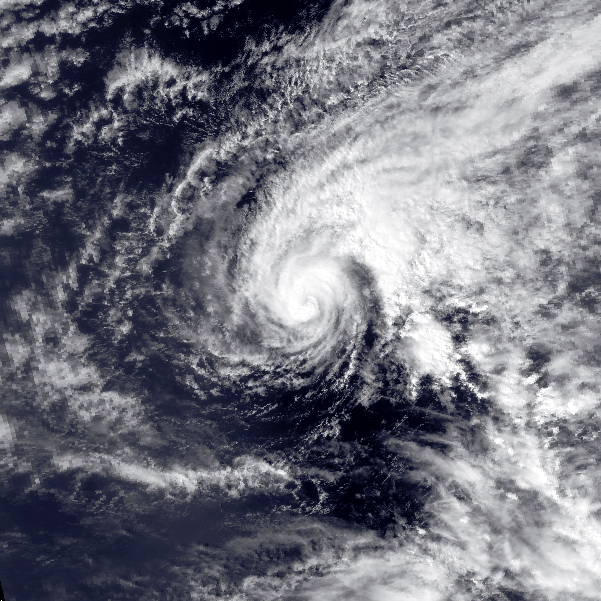
Hurricane Ekeka at peak intensity early on February 2

- 00:00 UTC (2:00 p.m. HST, February 1) at 9.2°N 173.7°W – Hurricane Ekeka strengthens to Category 3 intensity about 595 mi (955 km) south-southwest of Johnston Atoll, making it the first major hurricane of the season. It simultaneously attains its peak intensity, with maximum sustained winds of 115 mph (185 km/h) and an unknown minimum central pressure.
- 12:00 UTC (2:00 a.m. HST) at 9.5°N 174.6°W – Hurricane Ekeka weakens to Category 2 intensity about 605 mi (970 km) southwest of Johnston Atoll.

February 3

- 00:00 UTC (2:00 p.m. HST, February 2) at 9.6°N 175.7°W – Hurricane Ekeka weakens to Category 1 intensity about 645 mi (1,035 km) southwest of Johnston Atoll.
- 06:00 UTC (8:00 p.m. HST, February 2) at 9.7°N 176.4°W – Hurricane Ekeka weakens into a tropical storm about 675 mi (1,085 km) southwest of Johnston Atoll.
- 18:00 UTC (8:00 a.m. HST) at 9.4°N 180.0°W – Tropical Storm Ekeka crosses the International Date Line (IDL) into the Western Pacific basin about 870 mi (1,400 km) southwest of Johnston Atoll, becoming a part of the annual typhoon season.

=== March ===
March 28

- 06:00 UTC (8:00 p.m. HST, March 27) at 5.2°N 172.2°W – Tropical Depression Two-C forms from an area of unsettled weather about 815 mi (1,315 km) south-southwest of Johnston Atoll.

March 29

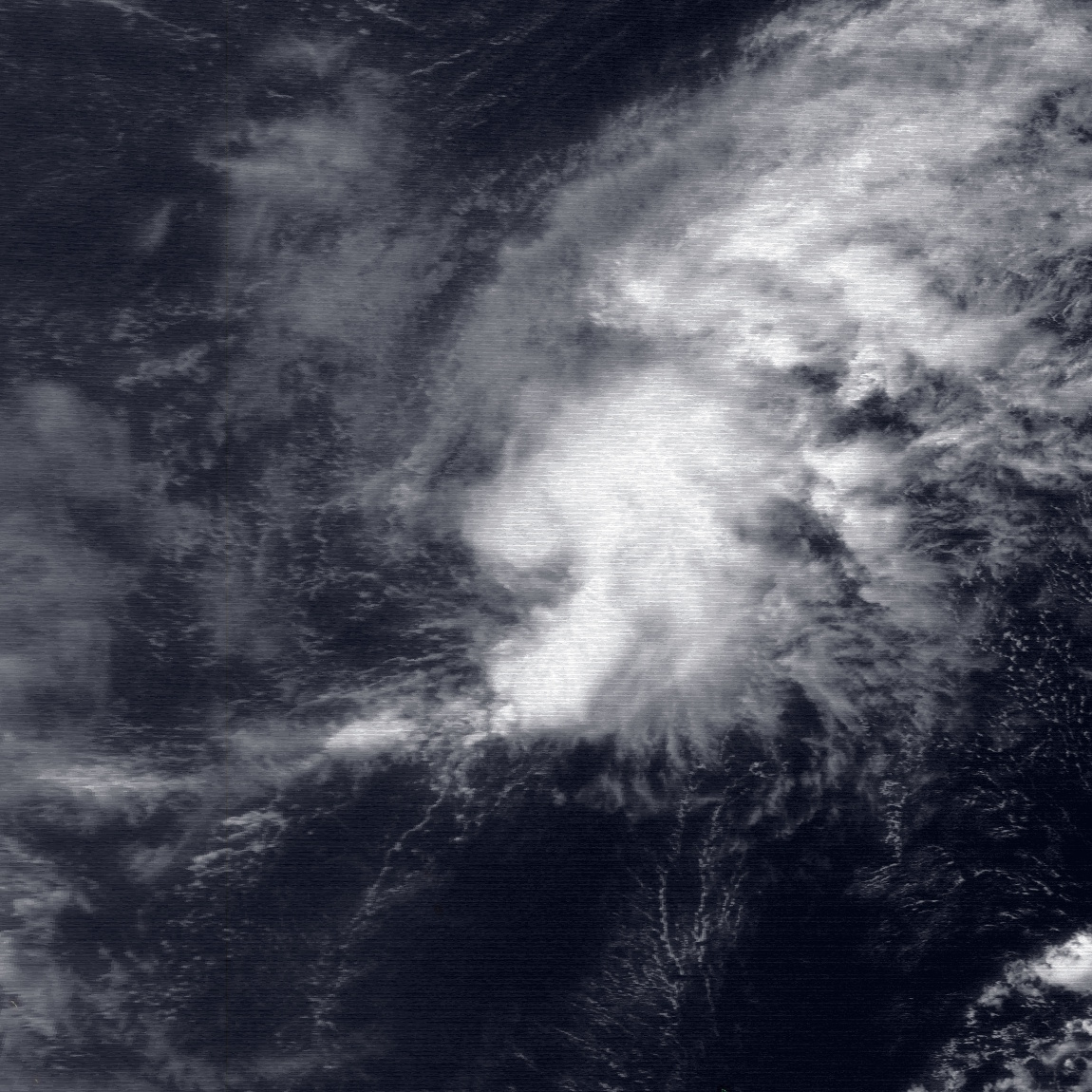
Tropical Storm Hali at peak intensity late on March 29

- 12:00 UTC (2:00 a.m. HST) at 5.7°N 173.8°W (Note: HURDAT places Tropical Storm Hali at 5.7°N 173.9°W, or about 815 mi (1,315 km) south-southwest of Johnston Atoll.) – Tropical Depression Two-C strengthens into Tropical Storm Hali about 815 mi (1,315 km) south-southwest of Johnston Atoll.
- 18:00 UTC (8:00 a.m. HST) at 5.9°N 174.0°W (Note: HURDAT places Tropical Storm Hali at 5.9°N 174.2°W, or about 810 mi (1,305 km) south-southwest of Johnston Atoll.) – Tropical Storm Hali attains its peak intensity, with maximum sustained winds of 50 mph (85 km/h) and an unknown minimum central pressure, about 805 mi (1,295 km) south-southwest of Johnston Atoll.

March 30

- 12:00 UTC (2:00 a.m. HST) at 6.7°N 175.3°W (Note: HURDAT places Tropical Depression Hali at 6.9°N 175.4°W, or about 790 mi (1,270 km) south-southwest of Johnston Atoll.) – Tropical Storm Hali weakens into a tropical depression about 795 mi (1,280 km) south-southwest of Johnston Atoll.
- 18:00 UTC (8:00 a.m. HST) at 7.0°N 175.5°W (Note: HURDAT places Tropical Depression Hali at 7.1°N 175.6°W, or about 785 mi (1,260 km) south-southwest of Johnston Atoll.) – Tropical Depression Hali is last noted as a tropical cyclone about 785 mi (1,260 km) south-southwest of Johnston Atoll, dissipating shortly thereafter.

=== April ===
- No tropical cyclones developed during the month of April.

=== May ===
- The 1992 Eastern Pacific hurricane season officially begins.
- No tropical cyclones developed during the month of May.

=== June ===
June 1

- The 1992 Central Pacific hurricane season officially begins.
- 12:00 UTC (5:00 a.m. PDT) at 11.1°N 102.2°W – Tropical Depression One-E forms from a tropical wave about 425 mi (685 km) south-southwest of Acapulco, Guerrero.

June 2

- 00:00 UTC (5:00 p.m. PDT, June 1) at 12.5°N 102.4°W – Tropical Depression One-E strengthens into Tropical Storm Agatha about 345 mi (555 km) south-southwest of Acapulco.

June 3

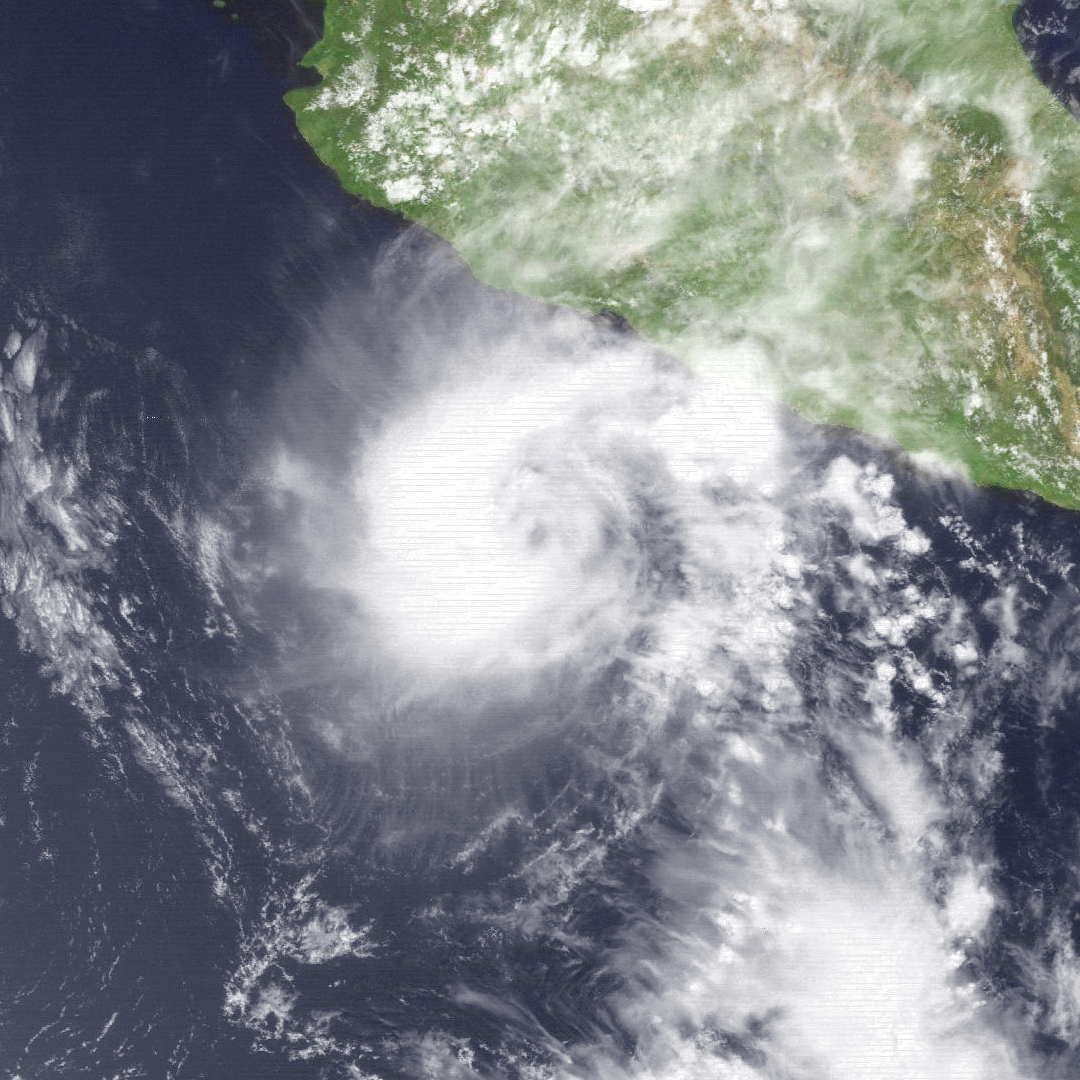
Tropical Storm Agatha near peak intensity late on June 2

- 00:00 UTC (5:00 p.m. PDT, June 2) at 15.7°N 102.9°W – Tropical Storm Agatha attains its peak intensity, with maximum sustained winds of 70 mph (110 km/h) and a minimum central pressure of 990 mbar (29.23 inHg), about 160 mi (260 km) southwest of Zihuatanejo, Guerrero.

June 5

- 00:00 UTC (5:00 p.m. PDT, June 4) at 17.0°N 105.8°W – Tropical Storm Agatha weakens into a tropical depression about 235 mi (380 km) south of Cabo Corrientes, Jalisco.
- 18:00 UTC (11:00 a.m. PDT) at 17.4°N 106.6°W – Tropical Depression Agatha is last noted as a tropical cyclone about 220 mi (350 km) south-southwest of Cabo Corrientes, dissipating shortly thereafter.

June 16

- 18:00 UTC (11:00 a.m. PDT) at 13.6°N 114.0°W – Tropical Depression Two-E forms several hundred miles off the Pacific coast of Mexico. It simultaneously attains its peak intensity, with maximum sustained winds of 35 mph (55 km/h) and a minimum central pressure of 1007 mbar (29.74 inHg).

June 18

- 12:00 UTC (5:00 a.m. PDT) at 15.8°N 117.1°W – Tropical Depression Two-E is last noted as a tropical cyclone over open waters, dissipating shortly thereafter.

June 22

- 12:00 UTC (5:00 a.m. PDT) at 15.9°N 111.0°W – Tropical Depression Three-E forms from a tropical wave about 490 mi (785 km) south of the southern tip of the Baja California peninsula.
- 12:00 UTC (5:00 a.m. PDT) at 11.5°N 91.5°W – Tropical Depression Four-E forms from a tropical wave about 215 mi (345 km) south-southeast of Ocós, San Marcos.

June 23

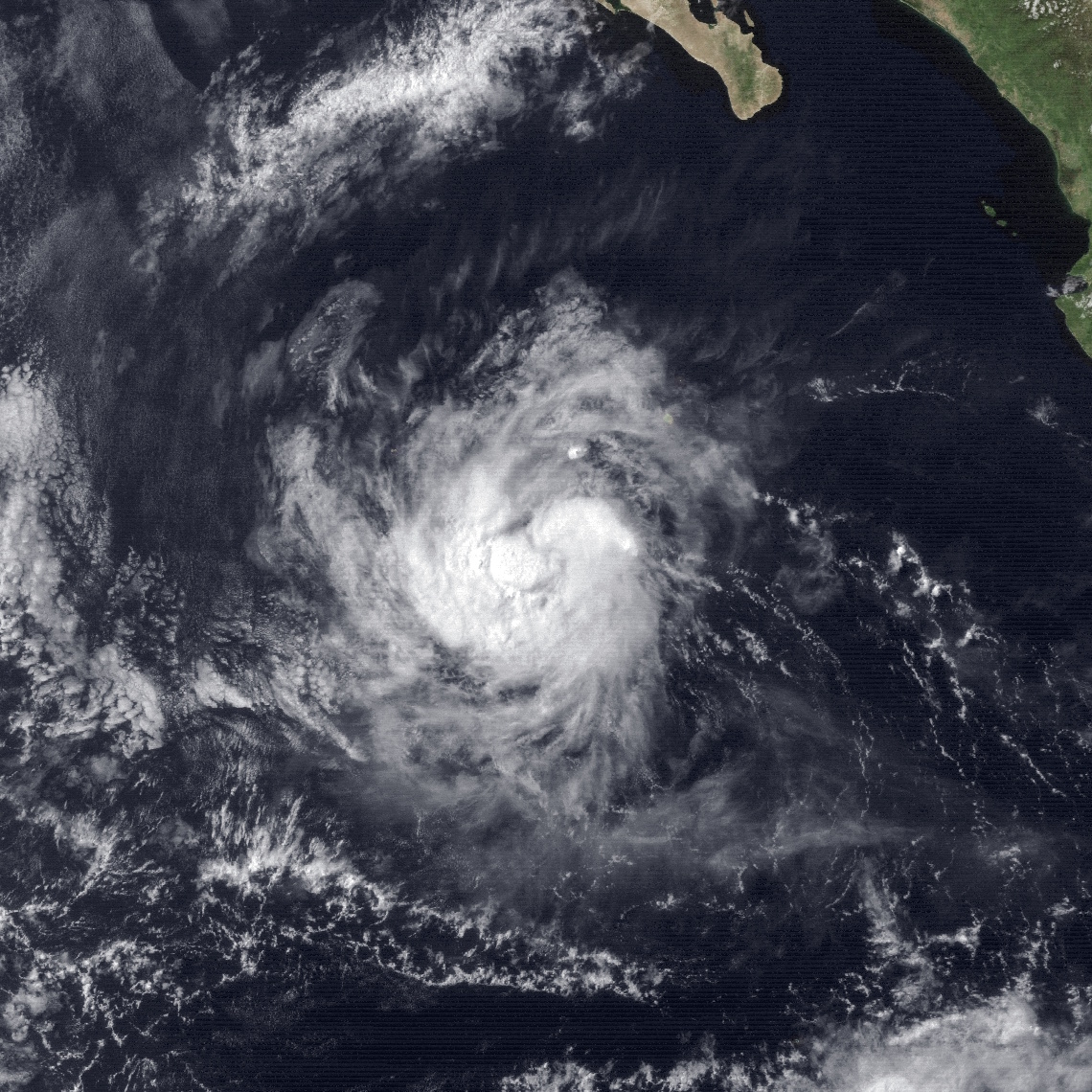
Tropical Depression Three-E late on June 22, shortly before becoming a tropical storm and receiving the name Blas

- 00:00 UTC (5:00 p.m. PDT, June 22) at 16.5°N 112.8°W – Tropical Depression Three-E strengthens into Tropical Storm Blas about 480 mi (770 km) south-southwest of the southern tip of the Baja California peninsula.
- 06:00 UTC (11:00 p.m. PDT, June 22) at 16.6°N 113.8°W – Tropical Storm Blas attains its peak intensity, with maximum sustained winds of 40 mph (65 km/h) and a minimum central pressure of 1004 mbar (29.65 inHg), about 500 mi (805 km) south-southwest of the southern tip of the Baja California peninsula.
- 18:00 UTC (11:00 a.m. PDT) at 16.1°N 115.7°W – Tropical Storm Blas weakens into a tropical depression about 600 mi (965 km) southwest of the southern tip of the Baja California peninsula, dissipating shortly thereafter.
- 18:00 UTC (11:00 a.m. PDT) at 12.3°N 97.1°W – Tropical Depression Four-E strengthens into Tropical Storm Celia about 235 mi (380 km) south of Puerto Ángel, Oaxaca.

June 24

- 18:00 UTC (11:00 a.m. PDT) at 13.2°N 101.0°W – Tropical Storm Celia strengthens into a Category 1 hurricane about 345 mi (555 km) west-southwest of Puerto Ángel.

June 26

- 06:00 UTC (11:00 p.m. PDT, June 25) at 14.2°N 106.5°W – Hurricane Celia strengthens to Category 2 intensity about 430 mi (695 km) south of Cabo Corrientes.
- 18:00 UTC (11:00 a.m. PDT) at 14.4°N 108.5°W – Hurricane Celia strengthens to Category 3 intensity about 455 mi (730 km) south-southwest of Cabo Corrientes, making it the second major hurricane of the season.

June 27

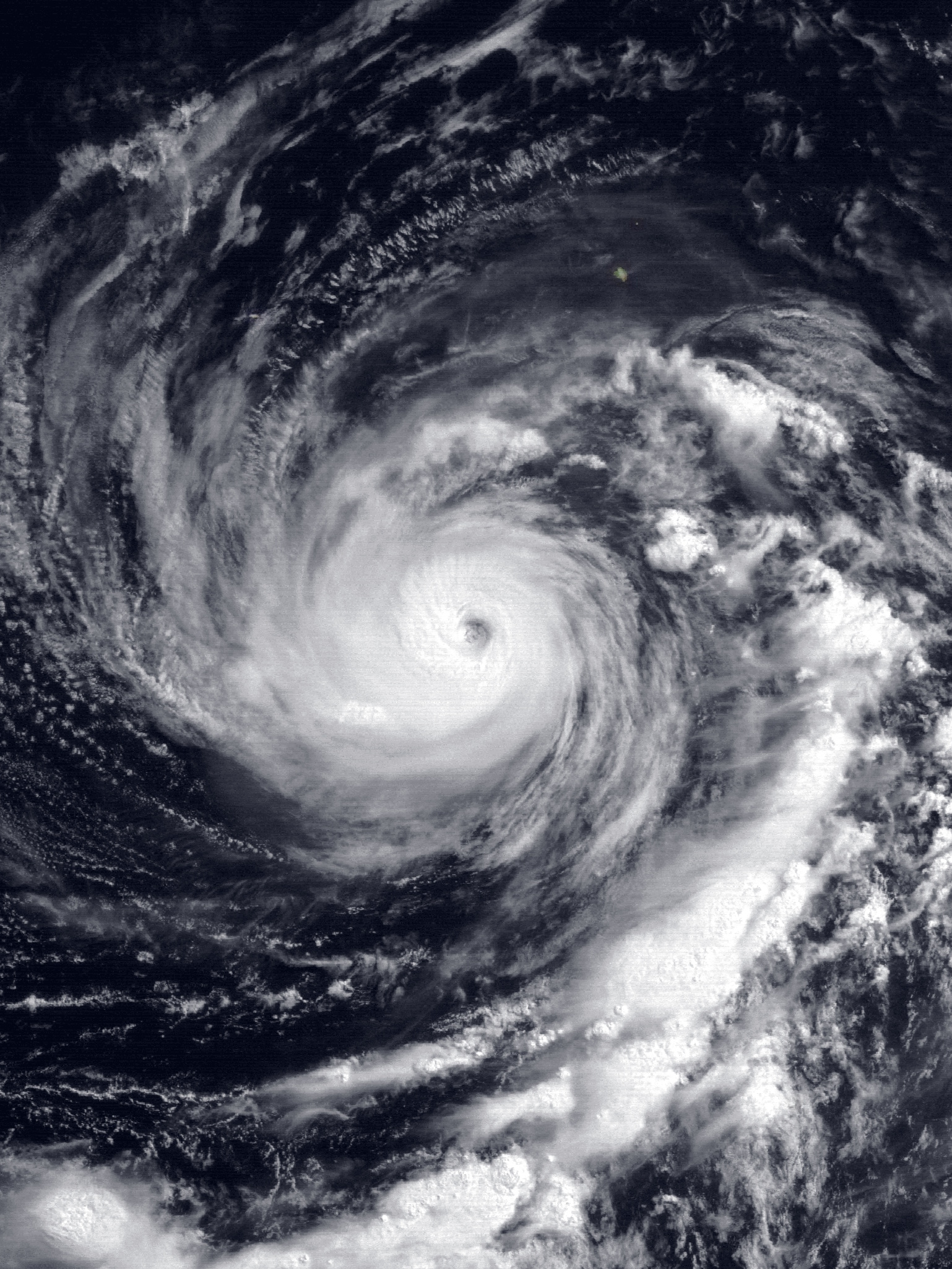
Hurricane Celia near peak intensity on June 27

- 00:00 UTC (5:00 p.m. PDT, June 26) at 14.5°N 109.6°W – Hurricane Celia strengthens to Category 4 intensity about 485 mi (780 km) south-southwest of Cabo Corrientes.
- 12:00 UTC (5:00 a.m. PDT) at 14.9°N 111.7°W – Hurricane Celia attains its peak intensity, with maximum sustained winds of 145 mph (230 km/h) and a minimum central pressure of 935 mbar (27.61 inHg), about 545 mi (880 km) southwest of Cabo Corrientes.

June 28

- 18:00 UTC (11:00 a.m. PDT) at 16.5°N 116.4°W – Hurricane Celia weakens to Category 3 intensity about 610 mi (980 km) southwest of the southern tip of the Baja California peninsula.

June 29

- 06:00 UTC (11:00 p.m. PDT, June 28) at 17.3°N 118.5°W – Hurricane Celia weakens to Category 2 intensity about 675 mi (1,085 km) southwest of the southern tip of the Baja California peninsula.
- 12:00 UTC (5:00 a.m. PDT) at 17.4°N 119.5°W – Hurricane Celia weakens to Category 1 intensity about 725 mi (1,165 km) west-southwest of the southern tip of the Baja California peninsula.

June 30

- 06:00 UTC (11:00 p.m. PDT, June 29) at 17.5°N 122.2°W – Hurricane Celia restrengthens to Category 2 intensity about 875 mi (1,410 km) west-southwest of the southern tip of the Baja California peninsula.

=== July ===
July 1

- 00:00 UTC (5:00 p.m. PDT, June 30) at 17.3°N 124.7°W – Hurricane Celia weakens back to Category 1 intensity about 1,030 mi (1,660 km) west-southwest of the southern tip of the Baja California peninsula.

July 2

- 00:00 UTC (5:00 p.m. PDT, July 1) at 17.3°N 127.6°W – Hurricane Celia weakens into a tropical storm about 1,210 mi (1,945 km) west-southwest of the southern tip of the Baja California peninsula.
- 12:00 UTC (5:00 a.m. PDT) at 12.5°N 95.0°W – Tropical Depression Five-E forms from a tropical wave about 445 mi (715 km) southeast of Acapulco.

July 3

- 00:00 UTC (5:00 p.m. PDT, July 2) at 17.6°N 130.0°W – Tropical Storm Celia weakens into a tropical depression about 1,345 mi (2,165 km) west-southwest of the southern tip of the Baja California peninsula.
- 12:00 UTC (5:00 a.m. PDT) at 11.8°N 98.5°W – Tropical Depression Five-E strengthens into Tropical Storm Darby about 360 mi (585 km) south-southeast of Acapulco.

July 4

- 18:00 UTC (11:00 a.m. PDT) at 20.3°N 133.6°W – Tropical Depression Celia dissipates about 1,525 mi (2,455 km) west of the southern tip of the Baja California peninsula. (Note: HURDAT maintains Celia as a tropical depression at 18:00 UTC (11:00 a.m. PDT) on July 4, terminating it afterwards.)

July 5

- 00:00 UTC (5:00 p.m. PDT, July 4) at 15.0°N 105.2°W – Tropical Storm Darby strengthens into a Category 1 hurricane about 290 mi (465 km) south of Manzanillo, Colima.
- 12:00 UTC (5:00 a.m. PDT) at 16.8°N 108.5°W – Hurricane Darby strengthens to Category 2 intensity about 215 mi (345 km) southeast of Socorro Island.

July 6

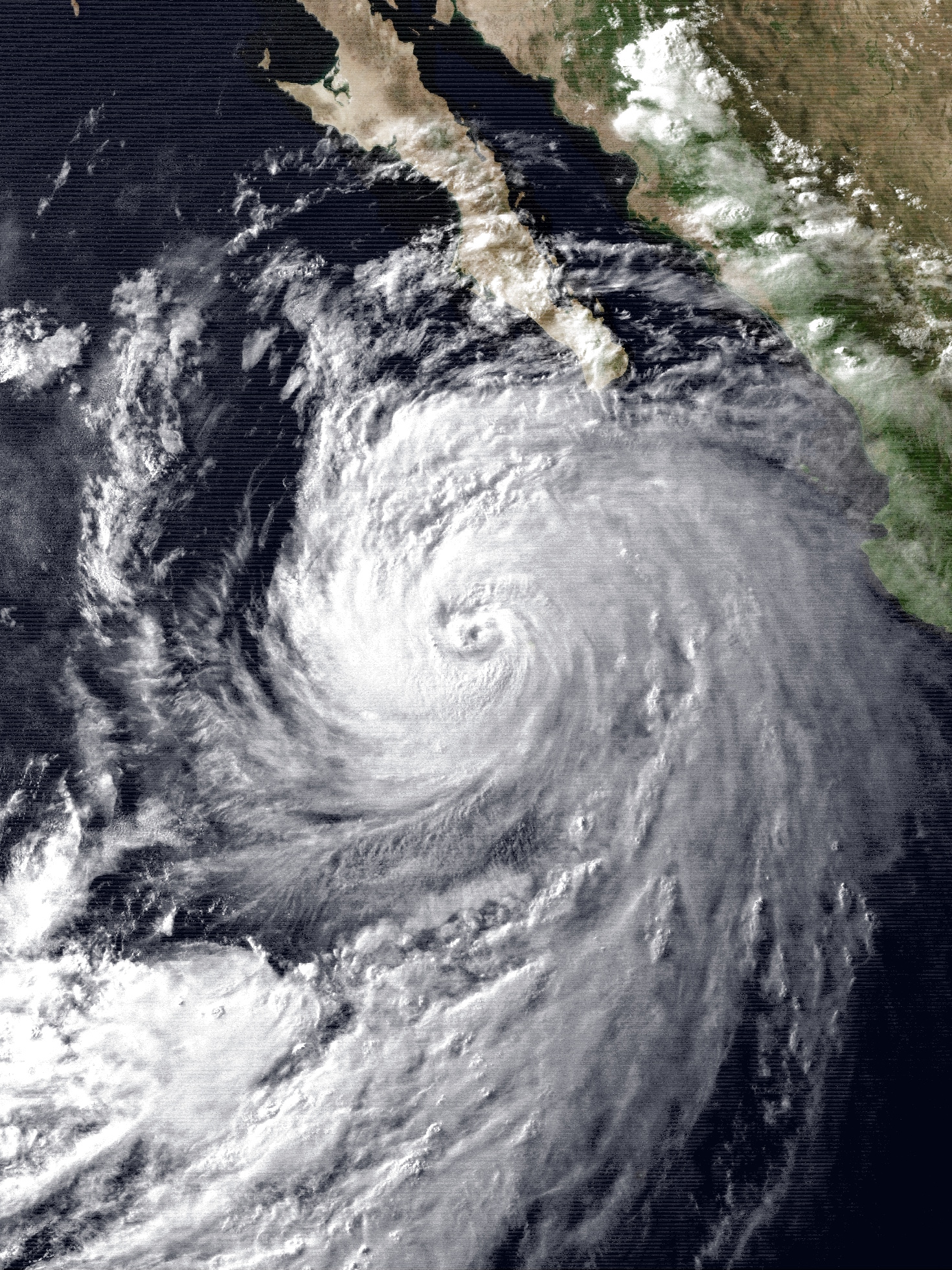
Hurricane Darby near peak intensity early on July 6

- 00:00 UTC (5:00 p.m. PDT, July 5) at 18.8°N 111.5°W – Hurricane Darby strengthens to Category 3 intensity about 35 mi (55 km) west of Socorro Island, making it the third major hurricane of the season.
- 06:00 UTC (11:00 p.m. PDT, July 5) at 19.9°N 113.0°W – Hurricane Darby attains its peak intensity, with maximum sustained winds of 120 mph (195 km/h) and a minimum central pressure of 968 mbar (28.59 inHg), about 155 mi (250 km) west-northwest of Socorro Island.
- 18:00 UTC (11:00 a.m. PDT) at 21.8°N 116.1°W – Hurricane Darby weakens to Category 2 intensity about 390 mi (630 km) west-northwest of Socorro Island.

July 7

- 12:00 UTC (5:00 a.m. PDT) at 23.9°N 120.3°W – Hurricane Darby weakens to Category 1 intensity about 660 mi (1,065 km) west of the southern tip of the Baja California peninsula.

July 8

- 00:00 UTC (5:00 p.m. PDT, July 7) at 24.5°N 122.4°W – Hurricane Darby weakens into a tropical storm about 795 mi (1,280 km) west of the southern tip of the Baja California peninsula.

July 9

- 00:00 UTC (5:00 p.m. PDT, July 8) at 26.6°N 125.3°W – Tropical Storm Darby weakens into a tropical depression about 995 mi (1,600 km) west-northwest of the southern tip of the Baja California peninsula.
- 00:00 UTC (5:00 p.m. PDT, July 8) at 11.7°N 108.4°W – Tropical Depression Six-E forms from a tropical wave about 675 mi (1,085 km) west-southwest of Acapulco.
- 18:00 UTC (11:00 a.m. PDT) at 12.6°N 111.3°W – Tropical Depression Six-E strengthens into Tropical Storm Estelle about 715 mi (1,150 km) south of the southern tip of the Baja California peninsula.

July 10

- 00:00 UTC (5:00 p.m. PDT, July 9) at 29.1°N 126.4°W – Tropical Depression Darby dissipates as it loses its tropical characteristics about 1,105 mi (1,780 km) west-northwest of the southern tip of the Baja California peninsula. (Note: HURDAT maintains Darby as a tropical depression at 00:00 UTC on July 10 (5:00 p.m. PDT on July 9), terminating it afterwards.)

July 11

- 06:00 UTC (11:00 p.m. PDT, July 10) t 11.9°N 117.2°W – Tropical Storm Estelle strengthens into a Category 1 hurricane about 900 mi (1,445 km) south-southwest of the southern tip of the Baja California peninsula.
- 12:00 UTC (5:00 a.m. PDT) at 12.1°N 118.1°W – Hurricane Estelle strengthens to Category 2 intensity about 915 mi (1,470 km) southwest of the southern tip of the Baja California peninsula.
- 18:00 UTC (11:00 a.m. PDT) at 12.6°N 118.9°W – Hurricane Estelle strengthens to Category 3 intensity about 920 mi (1,480 km) southwest of the southern tip of the Baja California peninsula, making it the fourth major hurricane of the season.

July 12

- 00:00 UTC (5:00 p.m. PDT, July 11) at 13.3°N 119.5°W – Hurricane Estelle strengthens to Category 4 intensity about 910 mi (1,465 km) southwest of the southern tip of the Baja California peninsula.
- 12:00 UTC (5:00 a.m. PDT) at 14.3°N 120.7°W – Hurricane Estelle weakens to Category 3 intensity about 920 mi (1,480 km) southwest of the southern tip of the Baja California peninsula.

July 13

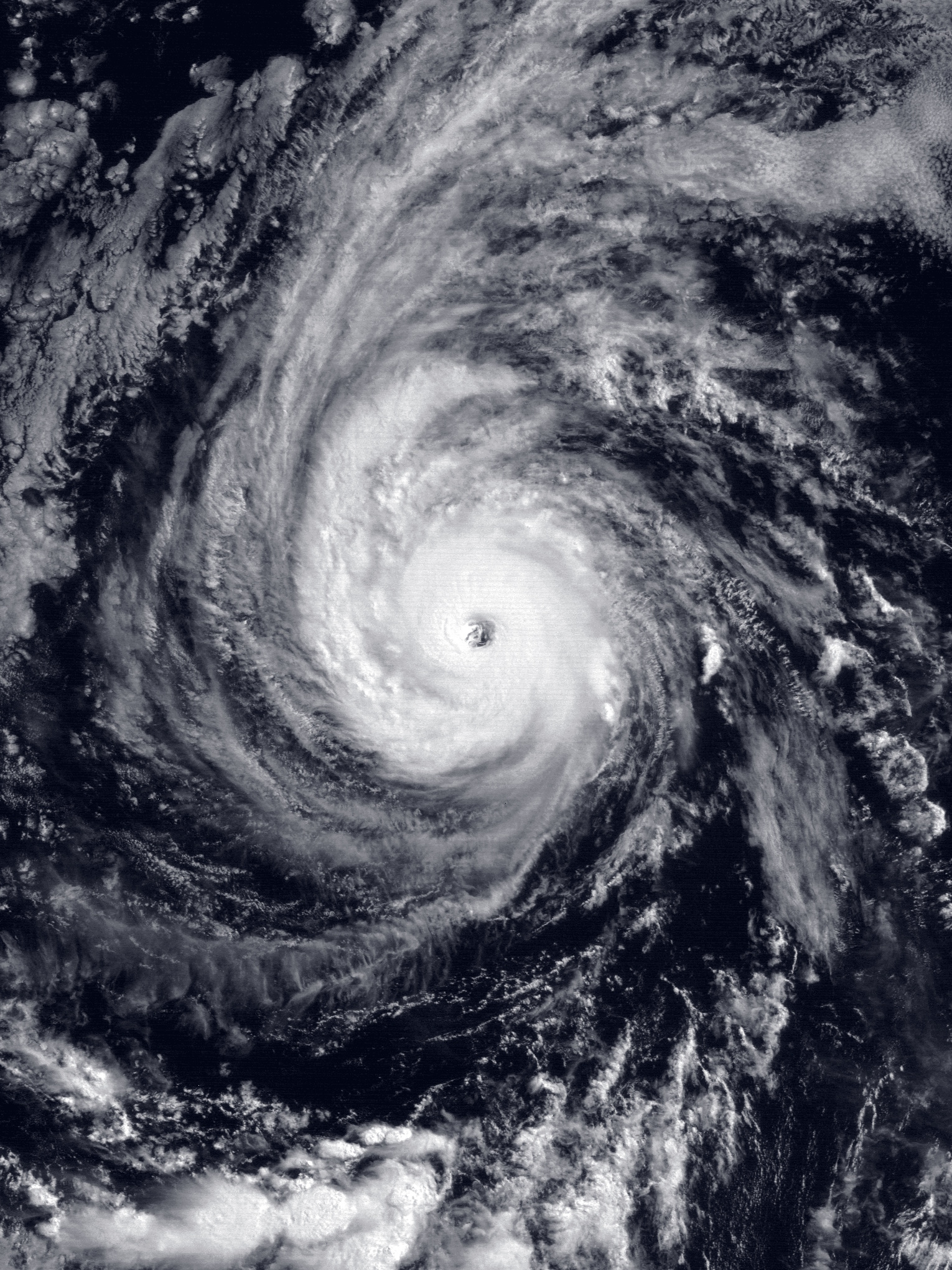
Hurricane Estelle near peak intensity on July 13

- 00:00 UTC (5:00 p.m. PDT, July 12) at 15.4°N 121.5°W – Hurricane Estelle weakens to Category 2 intensity about 915 mi (1,470 km) southwest of the southern tip of the Baja California peninsula.
- 06:00 UTC (11:00 p.m. PDT, July 12) at 15.8°N 121.7°W – Hurricane Estelle restrengthens to Category 3 intensity about 910 mi (1,465 km) west-southwest of the southern tip of the Baja California peninsula.
- 06:00 UTC (11:00 p.m. PDT, July 12) at 14.1°N 105.8°W – Tropical Depression Seven-E forms from a tropical wave about 660 mi (1,065 km) south-southeast of the southern tip of the Baja California peninsula.
- 12:00 UTC (5:00 a.m. PDT) at 16.3°N 122.0°W – Hurricane Estelle restrengthens to Category 4 intensity about 905 mi (1,455 km) west-southwest of the southern tip of the Baja California peninsula.
- 18:00 UTC (11:00 a.m. PDT) at 16.8°N 122.3°W – Hurricane Estelle attains its peak intensity, with maximum sustained winds of 140 mph (220 km/h) and a minimum central pressure of 943 mbar (27.85 inHg), about 905 mi (1,455 km) west-southwest of the southern tip of the Baja California peninsula.

July 14

- 00:00 UTC (5:00 p.m. PDT, July 13) at 13.7°N 107.3°W – Tropical Depression Seven-E strengthens into Tropical Storm Frank about 655 mi (1,055 km) south-southwest of the southern tip of the Baja California peninsula.
- 06:00 UTC (11:00 p.m. PDT, July 13) at 18.0°N 122.9°W – Hurricane Estelle weakens back to Category 3 intensity about 905 mi (1,455 km) west-southwest of the southern tip of the Baja California peninsula.
- 12:00 UTC (5:00 a.m. PDT) at 18.8°N 123.4°W – Hurricane Estelle weakens back to Category 2 intensity about 910 mi (1,465 km) west-southwest of the southern tip of the Baja California peninsula.
- 12:00 UTC (5:00 a.m. PDT) at 10.8°N 94.2°W – Tropical Depression Eight-E forms from a tropical wave about 375 mi (600 km) south of Salina Cruz, Oaxaca.
- 18:00 UTC (11:00 a.m. PDT) at 19.7°N 123.9°W – Hurricane Estelle weakens to Category 1 intensity about 920 mi (1,480 km) west-southwest of the southern tip of the Baja California peninsula.

July 15

- 06:00 UTC (11:00 p.m. PDT, July 14) at 21.5°N 124.9°W – Hurricane Estelle weakens into a tropical storm about 960 mi (1,545 km) west of the southern tip of the Baja California peninsula.
- 06:00 UTC (11:00 p.m. PDT, July 14) at 16.1°N 109.9°W – Tropical Storm Frank strengthens into a Category 1 hurricane about 465 mi (750 km) south of the southern tip of the Baja California peninsula.
- 06:00 UTC (11:00 p.m. PDT, July 14) at 12.2°N 97.4°W – Tropical Depression Eight-E strengthens into Tropical Storm Georgette about 310 mi (500 km) south-southwest of the southern tip of the Baja California peninsula.

July 16

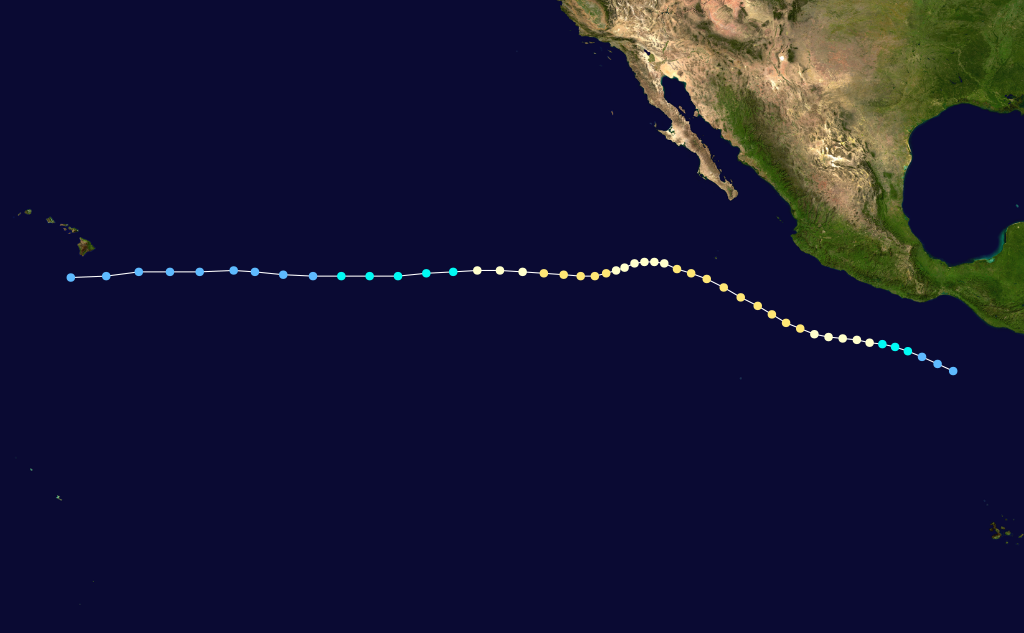
Storm path of Hurricane Georgette

- 00:00 UTC (5:00 p.m. PDT, July 15) at 12.8°N 100.1°W – Tropical Storm Georgette strengthens into a Category 1 hurricane about 405 mi (650 km) southwest of Salina Cruz.
- 06:00 UTC (11:00 p.m. PDT, July 15) at 16.2°N 112.3°W – Hurricane Frank strengthens to Category 2 intensity about 485 mi (780 km) south-southwest of the southern tip of the Baja California peninsula.
- 12:00 UTC (5:00 a.m. PDT) at 23.5°N 128.1°W – Tropical Storm Estelle weakens into a tropical depression about 1,150 mi (1,850 km) west of the southern tip of the Baja California peninsula.

July 17

- 00:00 UTC (5:00 p.m. PDT, July 16) at 16.0°N 114.7°W – Hurricane Frank strengthens to Category 3 intensity about 565 mi (905 km) southwest of the southern tip of the Baja California peninsula, making it the fifth major hurricane of the season.
- 06:00 UTC (11:00 p.m. PDT, July 16) at 23.5°N 130.6°W – Tropical Depression Estelle dissipates as it loses its tropical characteristics about 1,310 mi (2,110 km) west of the southern tip of the Baja California peninsula. (Note: HURDAT maintains Estelle as a tropical depression at 06:00 UTC on July 17 (11:00 p.m. PDT on July 16), terminating it afterwards.)
- 06:00 UTC (11:00 p.m. PDT, July 16) at 13.8°N 105.0°W – Hurricane Georgette strengthens to Category 2 intensity about 525 mi (845 km) southeast of Socorro Island.
- 18:00 UTC (11:00 a.m. PDT) at 15.7°N 118.1°W – Hurricane Frank strengthens to Category 4 intensity about 725 mi (1,165 km) southwest of the southern tip of the Baja California peninsula.

July 18

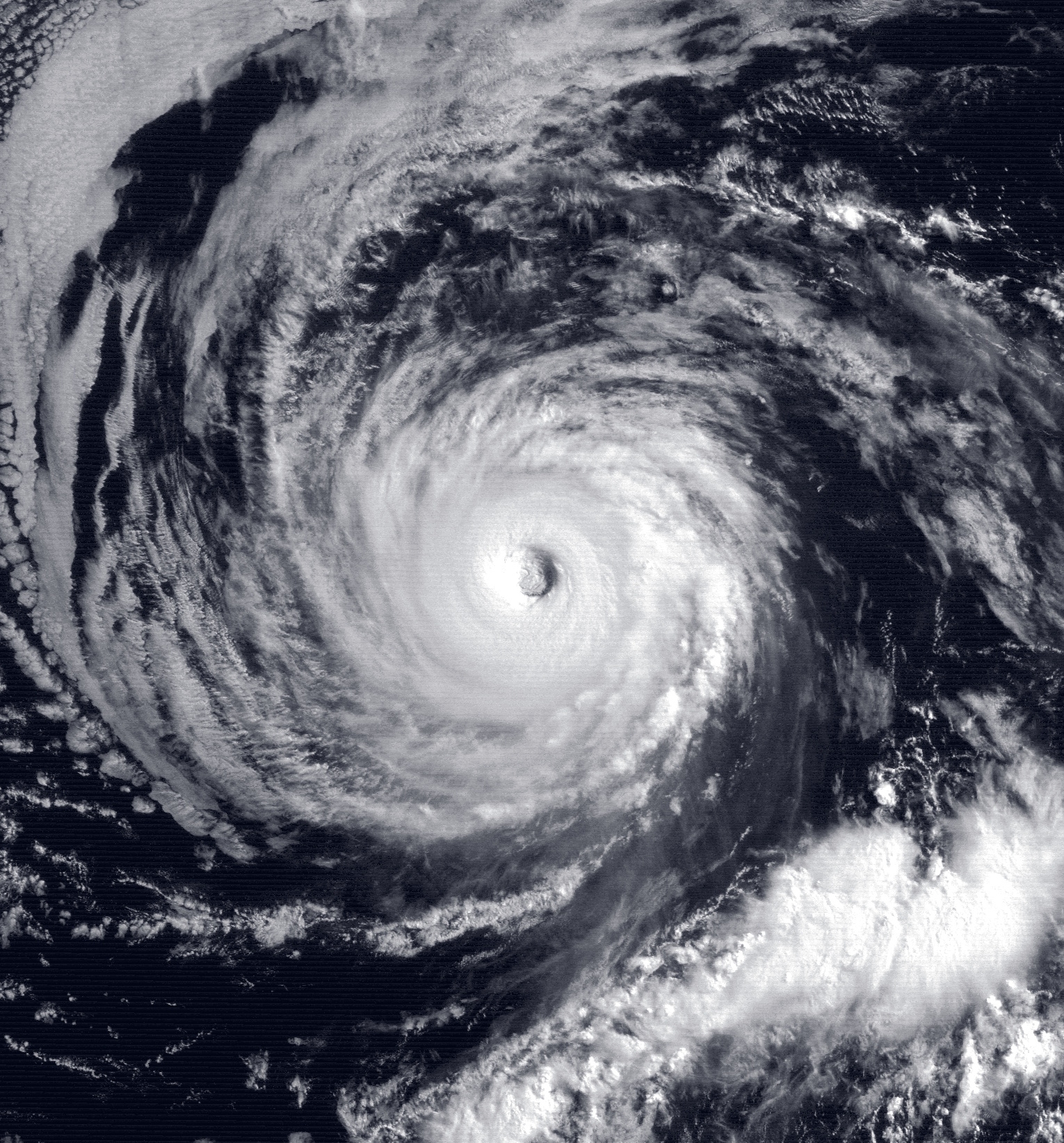
Hurricane Frank near peak intensity on July 18

- 06:00 UTC (11:00 p.m. PDT, July 17) at 16.0°N 109.2°W – Hurricane Georgette attains its peak intensity, with maximum sustained winds of 110 mph (175 km/h) and a minimum central pressure of 964 mbar (28.47 inHg), about 225 mi (360 km) south-southeast of Socorro Island.
- 12:00 UTC (5:00 a.m. PDT) at 16.1°N 121.8°W – Hurricane Frank attains its peak intensity, with maximum sustained winds of 145 mph (230 km/h) and a minimum central pressure of 935 mbar (27.61 inHg), about 905 mi (1,455 km) west-southwest of the southern tip of the Baja California peninsula.

July 19

- 06:00 UTC (11:00 p.m. PDT, July 18) at 17.5°N 126.0°W – Hurricane Frank weakens to Category 2 intensity about 1,105 mi (1,780 km) west-southwest of the southern tip of the Baja California peninsula.
- 12:00 UTC (5:00 a.m. PDT) at 18.4°N 114.6°W – Hurricane Georgette weakens to Category 1 intensity about 235 mi (380 km) west of Socorro Island.

July 20

- 00:00 UTC (5:00 p.m. PDT, July 19) at 19.5°N 130.3°W – Hurricane Frank weakens to Category 2 intensity about 1,330 mi (2,140 km) west of the southern tip of the Baja California peninsula.
- 12:00 UTC (5:00 a.m. PDT) at 20.7°N 133.0°W – Hurricane Frank weakens to Category 1 intensity about 1,485 mi (2,390 km) west of the southern tip of the Baja California peninsula.

July 21

- 00:00 UTC (5:00 p.m. PDT, July 20) at 17.7°N 118.7°W – Hurricane Georgette restrengthens to Category 2 intensity about 510 mi (825 km) west of Socorro Island.
- 18:00 UTC (11:00 a.m. PDT) at 23.1°N 138.3°W – Hurricane Frank weakens into a tropical storm about 1,800 mi (2,900 km) west of the southern tip of the Baja California peninsula.

July 22

- 06:00 UTC (8:00 p.m. HST, July 21) at 23.9°N 140.6°W – Tropical Storm Frank crosses 140°W into the Central Pacific basin about 970 mi (1,565 km) east-northeast of Hilo, Hawaii.
- 06:00 UTC (11:00 p.m. PDT, July 21) at 17.8°N 124.6°W – Hurricane Georgette weakens back to Category 1 intensity about 900 mi (1,445 km) west of Socorro Island.

July 23

- 00:00 UTC (2:00 p.m. HST, July 22) at 25.3°N 143.3°W (Note: Both HURDAT and the NHC's Preliminary Report place Tropical Depression Frank at 25.3°N 143.2°W, or about 850 mi (1,370 km) east-northeast of Hilo.) – Tropical Storm Frank weakens into a tropical depression about 845 mi (1,360 km) east-northeast of Hilo.
- 00:00 UTC (5:00 p.m. PDT, July 22) at 17.8°N 129.5°W – Hurricane Georgette weakens into a tropical storm about 1,215 mi (1,955 km) west of Socorro Island.
- 18:00 UTC (8:00 a.m. HST) at 27.6°N 145.6°W (Note: The NHC's Preliminary Report places the remnants of Tropical Depression Frank at 27.3°N 145.5°W, or about 800 mi (1,285 km) northeast of Hilo.) – Tropical Depression Frank dissipates about 810 mi (1,305 km) northeast of Hilo.

July 24

- 06:00 UTC (11:00 p.m. PDT, July 23) at 17.5°N 139.4°W – Tropical Storm Georgette weakens into a tropical depression about 1,865 mi (3,000 km) west of Socorro Island.
- 12:00 UTC (2:00 a.m. HST) at 17.5°N 141.5°W (Note: Both HURDAT and the NHC's Preliminary Report place Tropical Depression Georgette at 17.6°N 141.5°W, or about 900 mi (1,445 km) east of Hilo.) – Tropical Depression Georgette crosses 140°W into the Central Pacific basin about 905 mi (1,455 km) east of Hilo.

July 26

- 06:00 UTC (11:00 p.m. PDT, July 25) at 13.1°N 114.0°W – Tropical Depression Nine-E forms from a tropical wave about 725 mi (1,165 km) south-southwest of the southern tip of the Baja California peninsula.

July 27

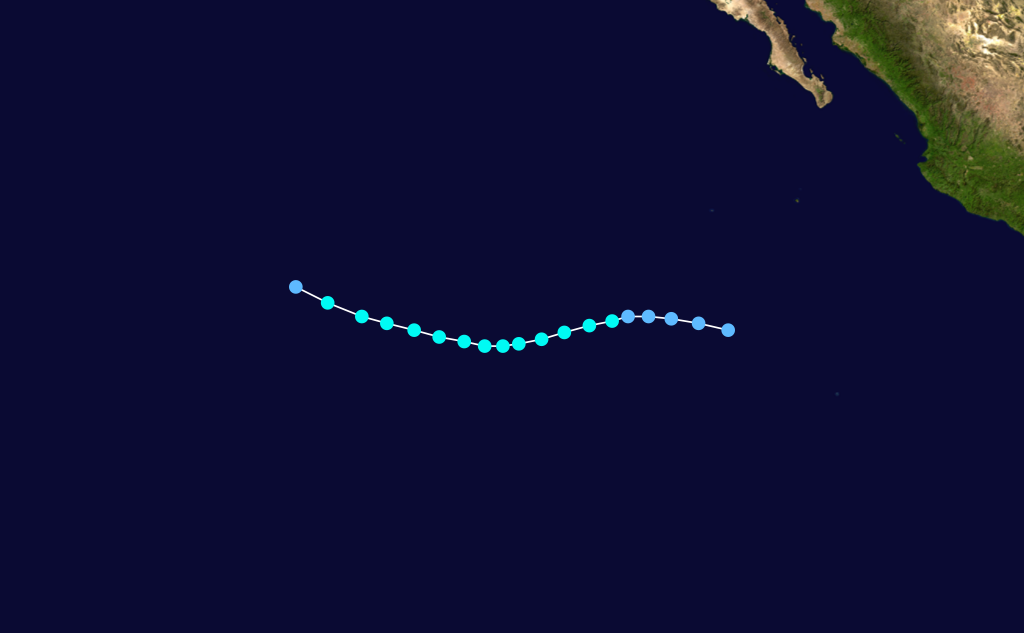
Storm path of Tropical Storm Howard

- 12:00 UTC (5:00 a.m. PDT) at 13.5°N 119.1°W – Tropical Depression Nine-E strengthens into Tropical Storm Howard about 880 mi (1,415 km) southwest of the southern tip of the Baja California peninsula.
- 18:00 UTC (8:00 a.m. HST) at 16.0°N 169.0°W – Tropical Depression Georgette is last noted as a tropical cyclone about 65 mi (100 km) southeast of Johnston Atoll, dissipating shortly thereafter. (Note: HURDAT terminates Tropical Depression Georgette at 06:00 UTC on July 26 (8:00 p.m. HST on July 25) near 17.5°N 156.5°W, or about 185 mi (295 km) south-southwest of Hilo.)

July 28

- 00:00 UTC (5:00 p.m. PDT, July 27) at 14.4°N 106.1°W – Tropical Depression Ten-E forms from a tropical wave about 345 mi (555 km) south-southwest of Manzanillo.
- 18:00 UTC (11:00 a.m. PDT) at 12.4°N 123.9°W – Tropical Storm Howard attains its peak intensity, with maximum sustained winds of 65 mph (100 km/h) and a minimum central pressure of 992 mbar (29.29 inHg), about 1,170 mi (1,880 km) southwest of the southern tip of the Baja California peninsula.
- 18:00 UTC (11:00 a.m. PDT) at 16.3°N 109.0°W – Tropical Depression Ten-E strengthens into Tropical Storm Isis about 360 mi (585 km) west-southwest of Manzanillo.

July 30

- 18:00 UTC (11:00 a.m. PDT) at 15.0°N 133.0°W – Tropical Storm Howard weakens into a tropical depression about 1,600 mi (2,575 km) west-southwest of the southern tip of the Baja California peninsula.
- 18:00 UTC (11:00 a.m. PDT) at 12.3°N 103.6°W – Tropical Depression Eleven-E forms from a tropical wave about 405 mi (650 km) southwest of Acapulco.

July 31

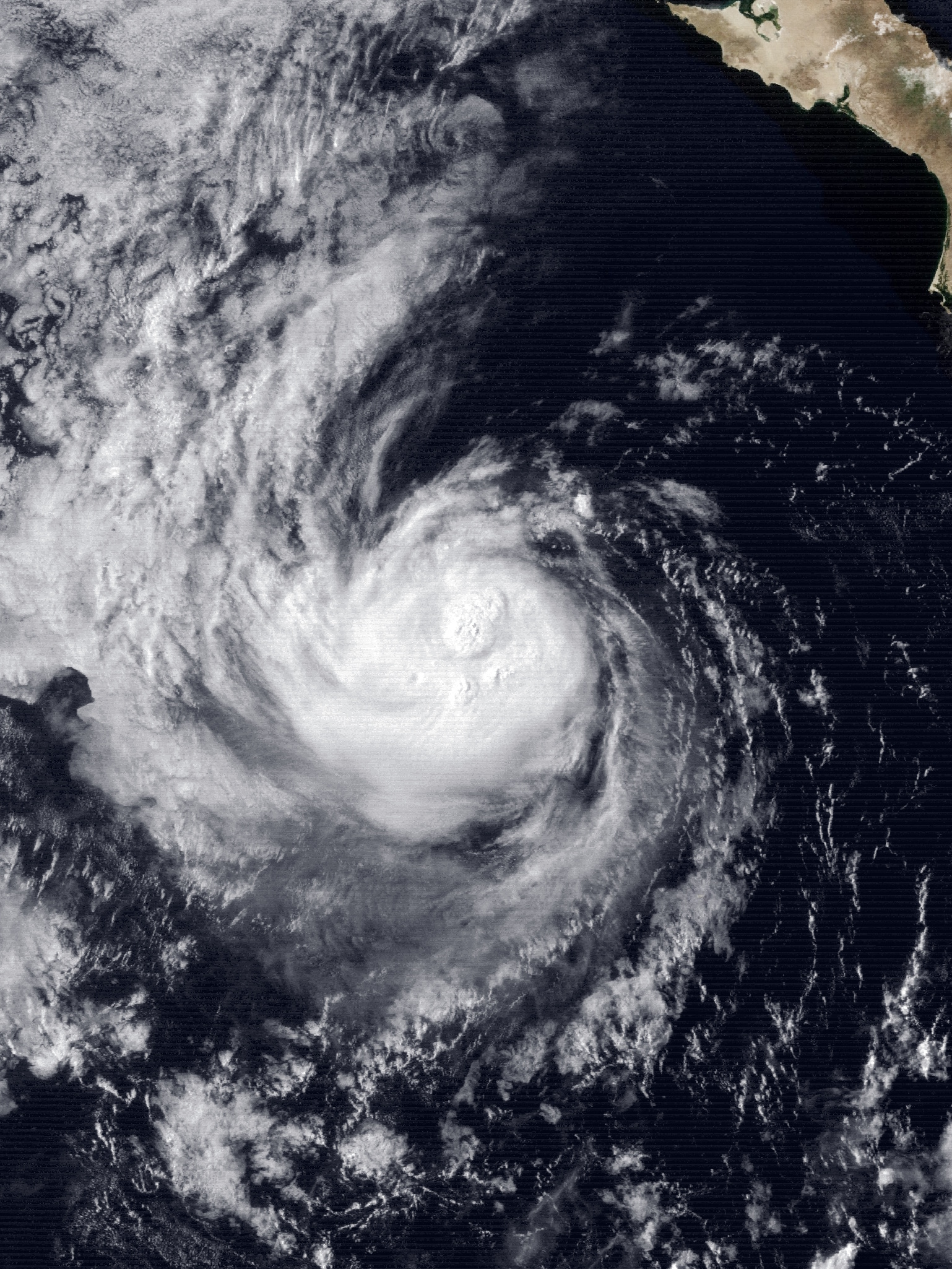
Tropical Storm Isis at peak intensity early on July 31

- 00:00 UTC (5:00 p.m. PDT, July 30) at 16.0°N 135.0°W – Tropical Depression Howard dissipates about 1,695 mi (2,730 km) west-southwest of the southern tip of the Baja California peninsula.
- 00:00 UTC (5:00 p.m. PDT, July 30) at 21.1°N 117.1°W – Tropical Storm Isis attains its peak intensity, with maximum sustained winds of 65 mph (100 km/h) and a minimum central pressure of 992 mbar (29.29 inHg), about 470 mi (760 km) west-southwest of the southern tip of the Baja California peninsula.

=== August ===
August 1

- 06:00 UTC (11:00 p.m. PDT, July 31) at 21.9°N 121.8°W – Tropical Storm Isis weakens into a tropical depression about 760 mi (1,220 km) west of the southern tip of the Baja California peninsula.

August 2

- 00:00 UTC (5:00 p.m. PDT, August 1) at 22.5°N 125.0°W – Tropical Depression Isis dissipates about 960 mi (1,545 km) west of the southern tip of the Baja California peninsula. (Note: HURDAT maintains Isis as a tropical depression at 00:00 UTC on August 2 (5:00 p.m. PDT on August 1), terminating it afterwards.)
- 06:00 UTC (11:00 p.m. PDT, August 1) at 14.5°N 115.7°W – Tropical Depression Eleven-E strengthens into Tropical Storm Javier about 690 mi (1,110 km) southwest of the southern tip of the Baja California peninsula.

August 5

- 18:00 UTC (11:00 a.m. PDT) at 18.4°N 128.6°W – Tropical Storm Javier strengthens into a Category 1 hurricane about 1,245 mi (2,000 km) west-southwest of the southern tip of the Baja California peninsula.

August 6

- 00:00 UTC (5:00 p.m. PDT, August 5) at 18.5°N 129.6°W – Hurricane Javier attains its peak intensity, with maximum sustained winds of 80 mph (130 km/h) and a minimum central pressure of 985 mbar (29.09 inHg), about 1,300 mi (2,095 km) west-southwest of the southern tip of the Baja California peninsula.

August 7

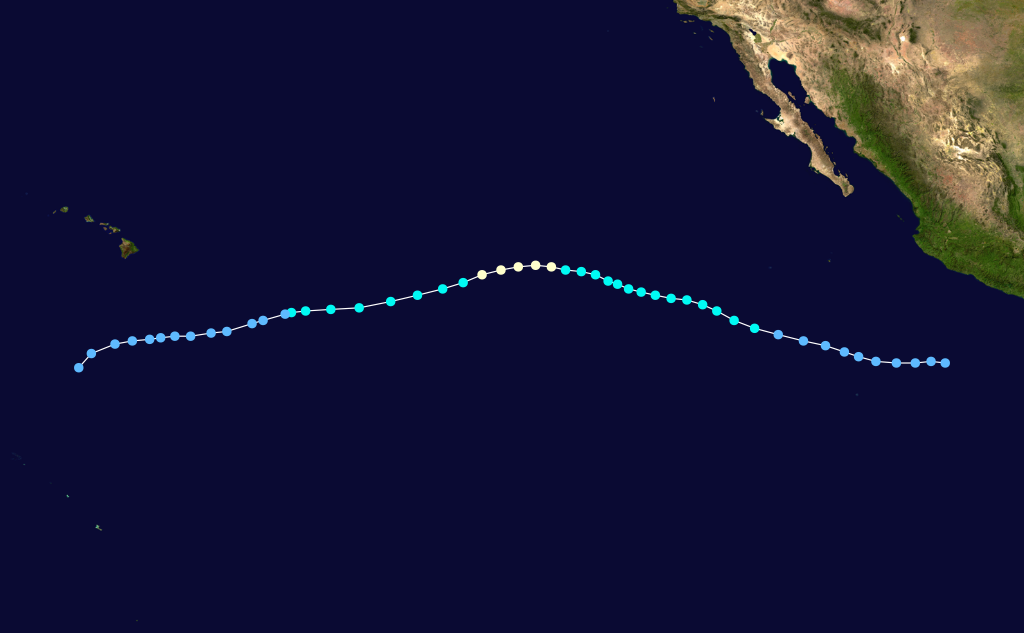
Storm path of Hurricane Javier

- 00:00 UTC (5:00 p.m. PDT, August 6) at 17.4°N 134.2°W – Hurricane Javier weakens into a tropical storm about 1,615 mi (2,600 km) west-southwest of the southern tip of the Baja California peninsula.

August 8

- 00:00 UTC (2:00 p.m. HST, August 7) at 15.8°N 140.8°W – Tropical Storm Javier crosses 140°W into the Central Pacific basin about 980 mi (1,575 km) east-southeast of Hilo.

August 9

- 00:00 UTC (2:00 p.m. HST, August 8) at 15.3°N 145.8°W (Note: Both HURDAT and the NHC's Preliminary Report place Tropical Depression Javier at 15.4°N 145.5°W, or about 695 mi (1,120 km) east-southeast of Hilo.) – Tropical Storm Javier weakens into a tropical depression about 685 mi (1,100 km) east-southeast of Hilo.

August 10

- 00:00 UTC (5:00 p.m. PDT, August 9) at 14.5°N 124.5°W – Tropical Depression Twelve-E forms over open waters, far away from any land areas.

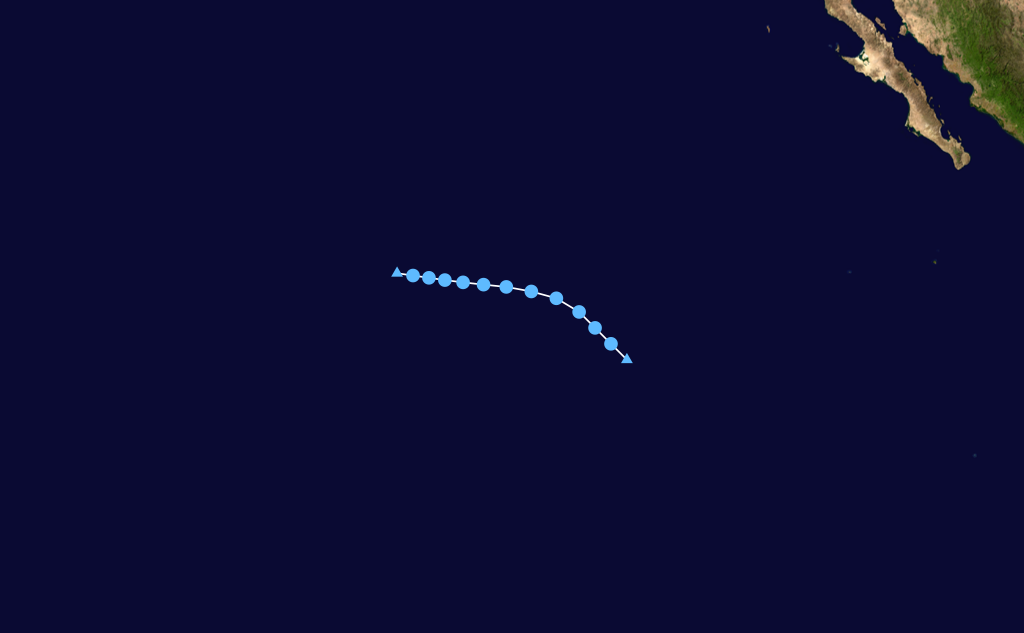
Storm path of Tropical Depression Twelve-E

- 06:00 UTC (11:00 p.m. PDT, August 9) at 15.2°N 125.2°W – Tropical Depression Twelve-E attains its peak intensity, with maximum sustained winds of 35 mph (55 km/h) and a minimum central pressure of 1006 mbar (29.71 inHg).

August 12

- 00:00 UTC (2:00 p.m. HST, August 11) at 12.0°N 158.6°W – Tropical Depression Javier is last noted as a tropical cyclone about 580 mi (935 km) south-southwest of Hilo, dissipating shortly thereafter.

August 13

- 00:00 UTC (5:00 p.m. PDT, August 12) at 18.3°N 134.6°W – Tropical Depression Twelve-E is last noted as a tropical cyclone over open waters, dissipating shortly thereafter.

August 18

- 06:00 UTC (11:00 p.m. PDT, August 17) at 19.1°N 111.4°W – Tropical Depression Thirteen-E forms from a tropical wave about 275 mi (445 km) south-southwest of the southern tip of the Baja California peninsula.

August 19

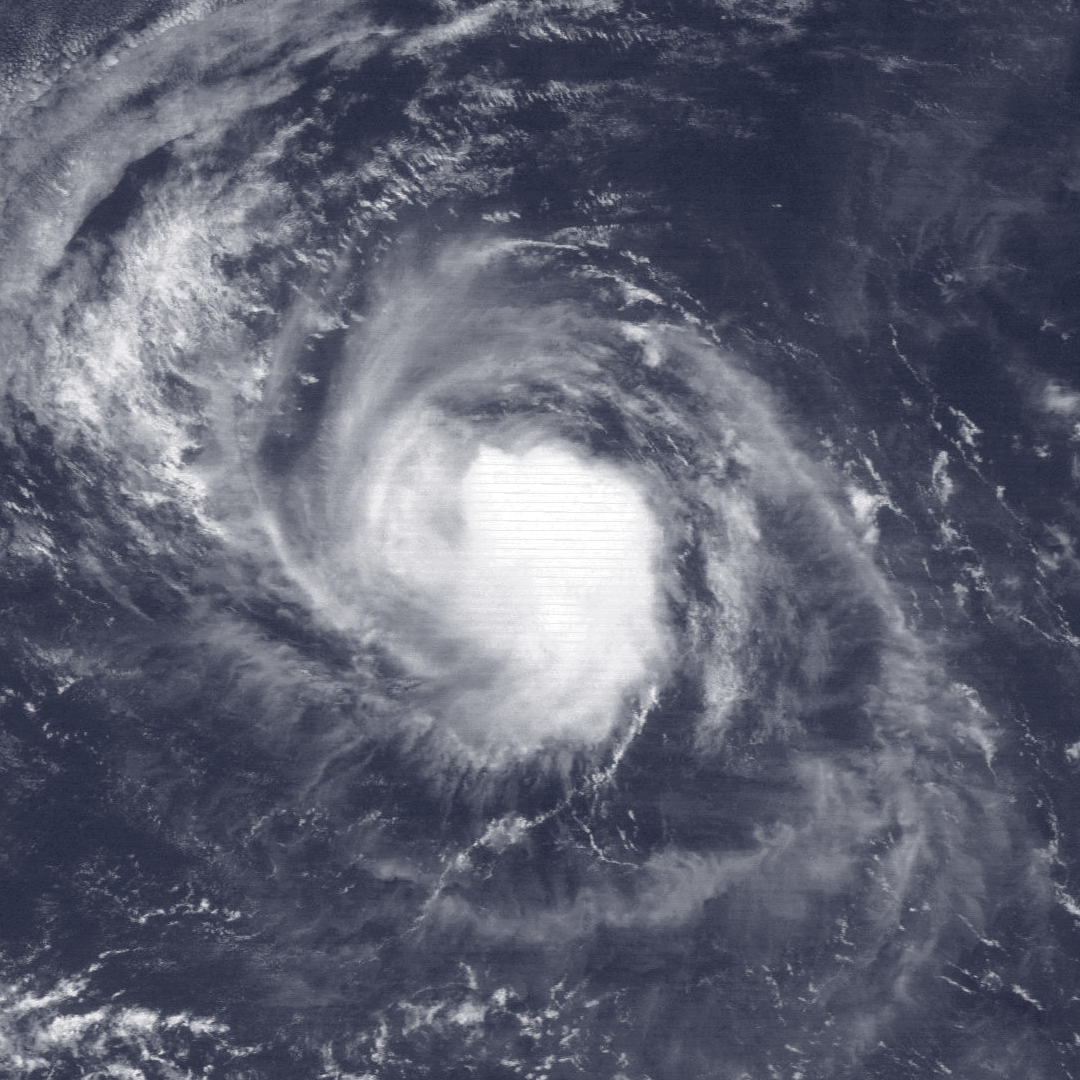
Tropical Storm Kay near peak intensity late on August 19

- 00:00 UTC (5:00 p.m. PDT, August 18) at 19.1°N 115.8°W – Tropical Depression Thirteen-E strengthens into Tropical Storm Kay about 460 mi (740 km) southwest of the southern tip of the Baja California peninsula.
- 18:00 UTC (11:00 a.m. PDT) at 19.1°N 119.8°W – Tropical Storm Kay attains its peak intensity, with maximum sustained winds of 50 mph (85 km/h) and a minimum central pressure of 1000 mbar (29.53 inHg), about 685 mi (1,100 km) west-southwest of the southern tip of the Baja California peninsula.

August 20

- 00:00 UTC (5:00 p.m. PDT, August 19) at 15.5°N 106.0°W – Tropical Depression Fourteen-E forms from a tropical wave about 270 mi (435 km) south-southwest of Manzanillo.
- 18:00 UTC (11:00 a.m. PDT) at 17.5°N 109.4°W – Tropical Depression Fourteen-E strengthens into Tropical Storm Lester about 140 mi (220 km) southeast of Socorro Island.

August 21

- 06:00 UTC (11:00 p.m. PDT, August 20) at 18.5°N 129.4°W – Tropical Storm Kay weakens into a tropical depression about 1,290 mi (2,075 km) west-southwest of the southern tip of the Baja California peninsula.

August 22

- 18:00 UTC (11:00 a.m. PDT) at 17.8°N 138.6°W – Tropical Depression Kay is last noted as a tropical cyclone about 1,880 mi (3,030 km) west of the southern tip of the Baja California peninsula, dissipating shortly thereafter.
- 18:00 UTC (11:00 a.m. PDT) at 24.0°N 114.1°W – Tropical Storm Lester strengthens into a Category 1 hurricane about 240 mi (390 km) west of La Paz, Baja California Sur.

August 23

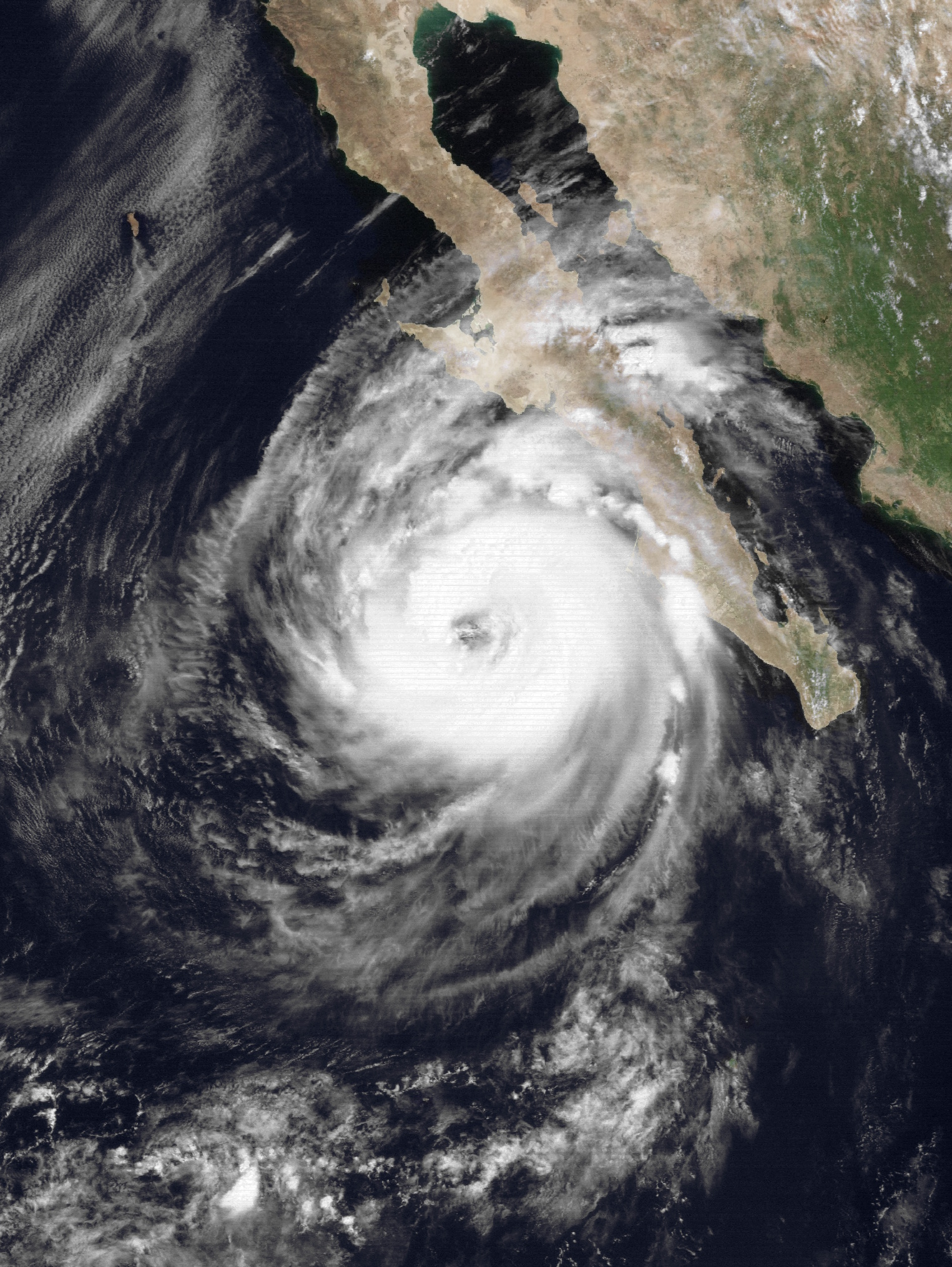
Hurricane Lester approaching the Baja California peninsula late on August 22

- 00:00 UTC (5:00 p.m. PDT, August 22) at 25.0°N 114.0°W – Hurricane Lester attains its peak intensity, with maximum sustained winds of 85 mph (140 km/h) and a minimum central pressure of 977 mbar (28.85 inHg), about 240 mi (390 km) west-northwest of La Paz. (Note: HURDAT gives Hurricane Lester a slightly weaker peak intensity—80 mph (130 km/h) and 985 mbar (29.09 inHg)—at 18:00 UTC (11:00 a.m. PDT) on August 22.)
- 10:00 UTC (3:00 a.m. PDT) at 26.8°N 113.3°W – Hurricane Lester makes its first landfall near Punta Abreojos, Baja California Sur, with maximum sustained winds of 75 mph (120 km/h) and a central pressure of 988 mbar (29.18 inHg).
- 18:00 UTC (5:00 a.m. PDT) at 28.4°N 112.5°W – Hurricane Lester emerges over the Gulf of California and weakens into a tropical storm about 320 mi (520 km) north-northwest of La Paz. (Note: According to HURDAT, Lester weakened into a tropical storm six hours earlier near 27.1°N 113.3°W, while still located over the Baja California peninsula.)
- 20:00 UTC (1:00 p.m. PDT) at 29.0°N 112.2°W – Tropical Storm Lester makes its second and final landfall near Isla Tiburon with maximum sustained winds of 60 mph (95 km/h) and a central pressure of 995 mbar (29.38 inHg).

August 24

- 12:00 UTC (5:00 a.m. PDT) at 33.5°N 109.0°W – Tropical Storm Lester weakens into a tropical depression over land about 145 mi (230 km) northeast of Tucson, Arizona.
- 18:00 UTC (11:00 a.m. PDT) at 35.0°N 107.0°W – Tropical Depression Lester is last noted as a tropical cyclone over land about 295 mi (470 km) northeast of Tucson, dissipating shortly over central New Mexico shortly thereafter.

August 27

- 12:00 UTC (5:00 a.m. PDT) at 12.7°N 122.6°W – Tropical Depression Fifteen-E forms from a tropical wave about 1,085 mi (1,750 km) southwest of the southern tip of the Baja California peninsula.
- 12:00 UTC (5:00 a.m. PDT) at 11.1°N 107.3°W – Tropical Depression Sixteen-E forms from a tropical wave about 835 mi (1,345 km) south of the southern tip of the Baja California peninsula.

August 28

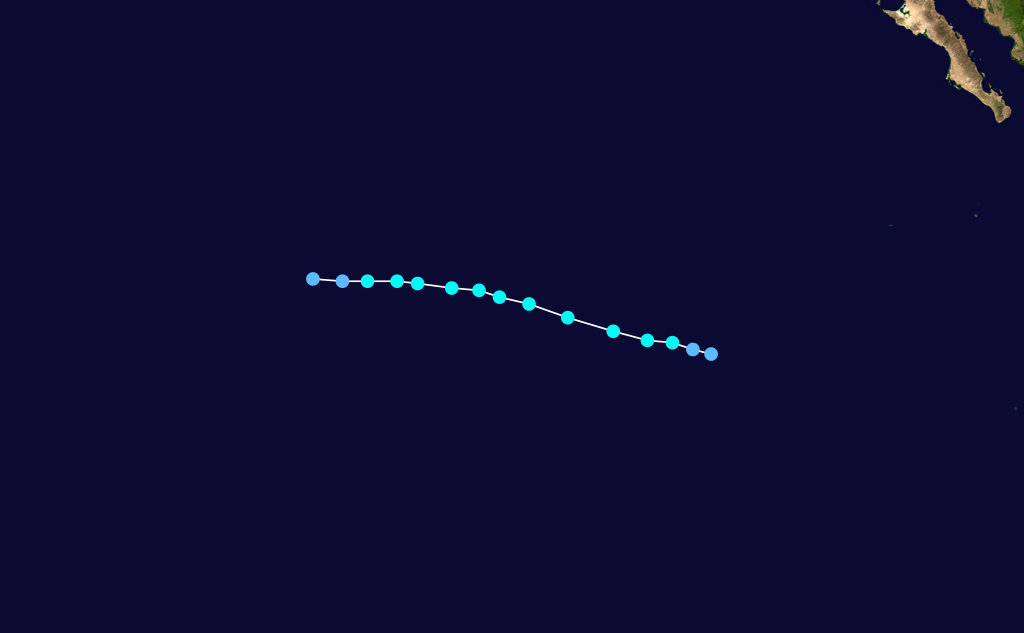
Storm path of Tropical Storm Madeline

- 00:00 UTC (5:00 p.m. PDT, August 27) at 13.2°N 124.3°W – Tropical Depression Fifteen-E strengthens into Tropical Storm Madeline about 1,150 mi (1,850 km) southwest of the southern tip of the Baja California peninsula.
- 06:00 UTC (11:00 p.m. PDT, August 27) at 11.7°N 111.4°W – Tropical Depression Sixteen-E strengthens into Tropical Storm Newton about 775 mi (1,250 km) south of the southern tip of the Baja California peninsula.

August 29

- 00:00 UTC (5:00 p.m. PDT, August 28) at 14.9°N 130.6°W – Tropical Storm Madeline attains its peak intensity, with maximum sustained winds of 50 mph (85 km/h) and a minimum central pressure of 999 mbar (29.50 inHg), about 1,455 mi (2,345 km) west-southwest of the southern tip of the Baja California peninsula.

August 30

- 06:00 UTC (11:00 p.m. PDT, August 29) at 13.4°N 122.4°W – Tropical Storm Newton attains its peak intensity, with maximum sustained winds of 50 mph (85 km/h) and a minimum central pressure of 999 mbar (29.50 inHg), about 1,045 mi (1,685 km) southwest of the southern tip of the Baja California peninsula.
- 18:00 UTC (11:00 a.m. PDT) at 15.9°N 138.8°W – Tropical Storm Madeline weakens into a tropical depression about 1,935 mi (3,110 km) west-southwest of the southern tip of the Baja California peninsula.

August 31

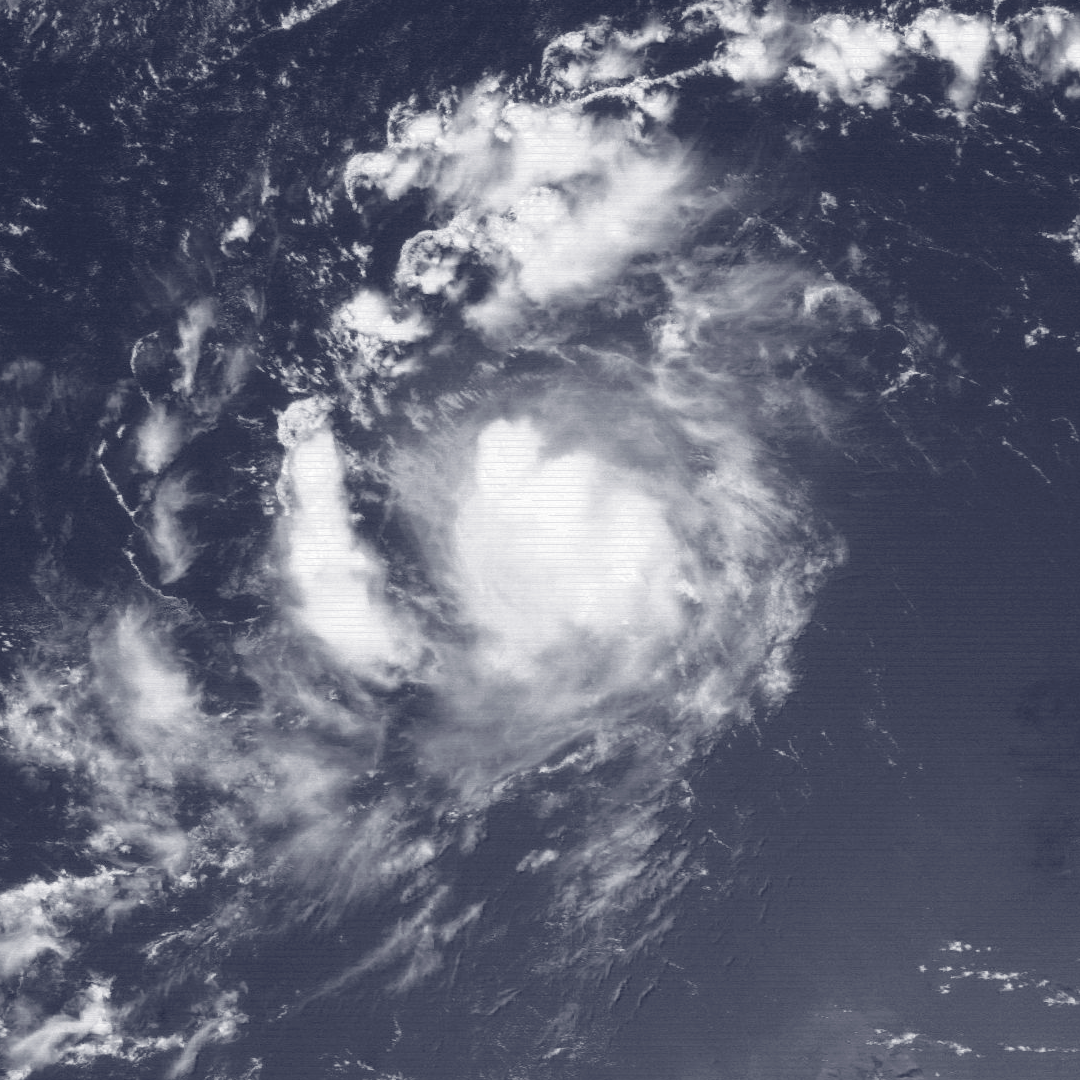
Tropical Storm Newton near peak intensity late on August 29

- 00:00 UTC (2:00 p.m. HST, August 30) at 16.0°N 140.1°W – Tropical Depression Madeline is last noted as a tropical cyclone crossing 140°W into the Central Pacific basin about 1,020 mi (1,640 km) east-southeast of Hilo, dissipating shortly thereafter.
- 12:00 UTC (5:00 a.m. PDT) at 14.9°N 130.9°W – Tropical Storm Newton weakens into a tropical depression about 1,475 mi (2,370 km) west-southwest of the southern tip of the Baja California peninsula.
- 18:00 UTC (11:00 a.m. PDT) at 14.9°N 132.5°W – Tropical Depression Newton is last noted as a tropical cyclone about 1,570 mi (2,530 km) west-southwest of the southern tip of the Baja California peninsula, dissipating shortly thereafter.

=== September ===
September 2

- 18:00 UTC (11:00 a.m. PDT) at 9.9°N 102.5°W – Tropical Depression Seventeen-E forms from a tropical wave about 510 mi (825 km) south-southwest of Acapulco.

September 3

- 00:00 UTC (5:00 p.m. PDT, September 2) at 10.1°N 103.8°W – Tropical Depression Seventeen-E strengthens into Tropical Storm Orlene about 535 mi (860 km) south-southwest of Acapulco.
- 18:00 UTC (11:00 a.m. PDT) at 11.0°N 107.9°W – Tropical Storm Orlene strengthens into a Category 1 hurricane about 675 mi (1,085 km) southwest of Acapulco.

September 4

- 06:00 UTC (11:00 p.m. PDT, September 3) at 11.4°N 111.1°W – Hurricane Orlene strengthens to Category 2 intensity about 795 mi (1,280 km) south of the southern tip of the Baja California peninsula.
- 18:00 UTC (11:00 a.m. PDT) at 11.9°N 114.2°W – Hurricane Orlene strengthens to Category 3 intensity about 805 mi (1,295 km) south-southwest of the southern tip of the Baja California peninsula, making it the sixth major hurricane of the season.

September 5

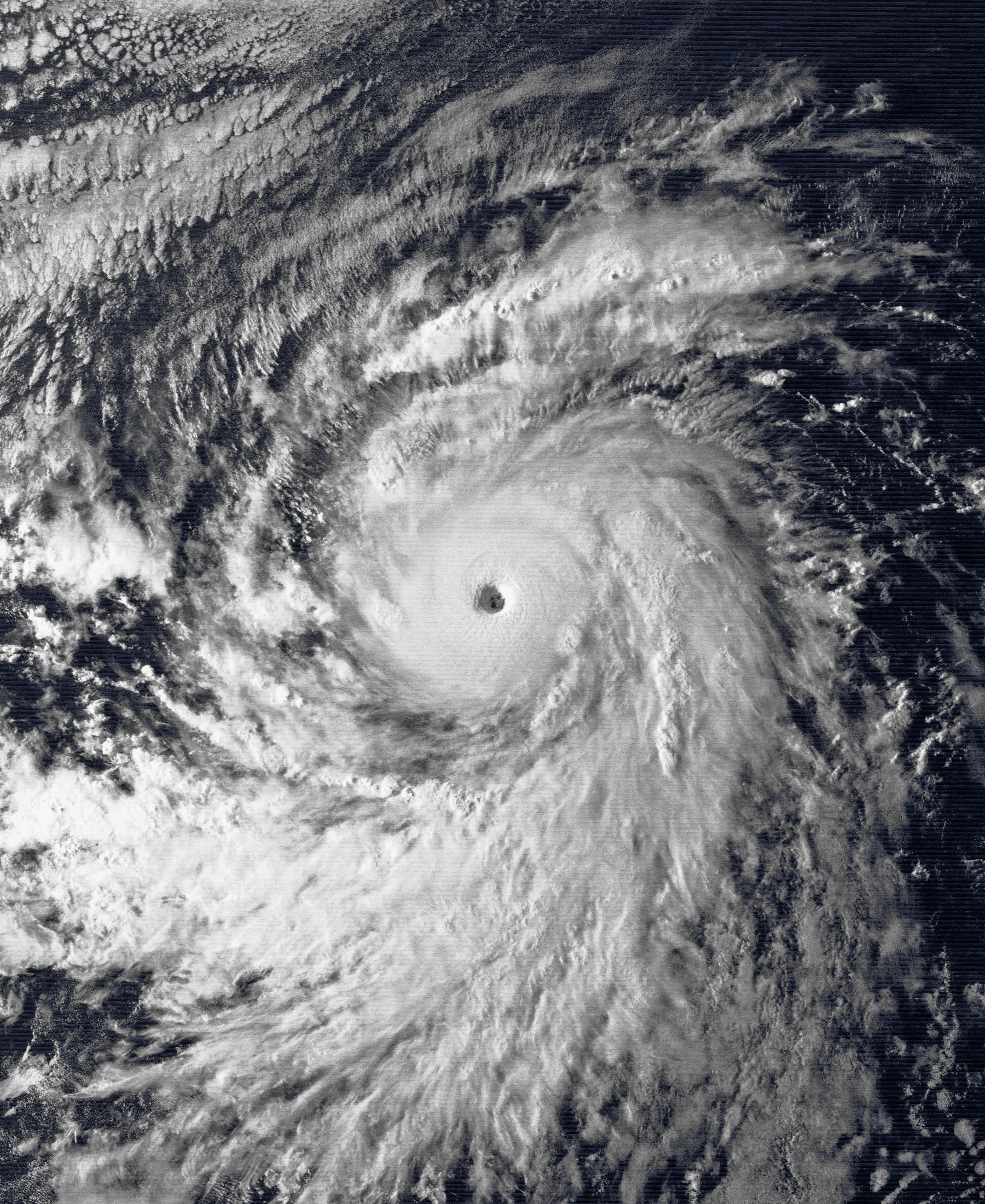
Hurricane Orlene near peak intensity early on September 6

- 06:00 UTC (11:00 p.m. PDT, September 4) at 12.5°N 117.3°W – Hurricane Orlene strengthens to Category 4 intensity about 865 mi (1,390 km) southwest of the southern tip of the Baja California peninsula.
- 18:00 UTC (11:00 a.m. PDT) at 11.9°N 133.0°W – Tropical Depression Eighteen-E forms from an area of unsettled weather, possibly associated with a tropical wave, about 1,690 mi (2,720 km) west-southwest of the southern tip of the Baja California peninsula.

September 6

- 06:00 UTC (11:00 p.m. PDT, September 5) at 14.4°N 123.1°W – Hurricane Orlene attains its peak intensity, with maximum sustained winds of 145 mph (230 km/h) and a minimum central pressure of 934 mbar (27.58 inHg), about 1,040 mi (1,675 km) southwest of the southern tip of the Baja California peninsula.
- 18:00 UTC (8:00 a.m. HST) at 12.2°N 140.0°W (Note: HURDAT places Tropical Depression Eighteen-E—future Hurricane Iniki—just outside of the Central Pacific basin at 12.2°N 139.8°W, or about 1,140 mi (1,835 km) east-southeast of Hilo.) – Tropical Depression Eighteen-E crosses 140°W into the Central Pacific basin about 1,130 mi (1,815 km) east-southeast of Hilo.

September 7

- 18:00 UTC (11:00 a.m. PDT) at 17.4°N 130.1°W – Hurricane Orlene weakens to Category 3 intensity about 1,360 mi (2,185 km) west-southwest of the southern tip of the Baja California peninsula.

September 8

- 00:00 UTC (2:00 p.m. HST, September 7) at 12.0°N 144.5°W – Tropical Depression Eighteen-E strengthens into Tropical Storm Iniki about 880 mi (1,415 km) southeast of Hilo.
- 06:00 UTC (11:00 p.m. PDT, September 7) at 18.2°N 132.2°W – Hurricane Orlene weakens to Category 2 intensity about 1,475 mi (2,370 km) west of the southern tip of the Baja California peninsula.
- 18:00 UTC (11:00 a.m. PDT) at 18.8°N 133.9°W – Hurricane Orlene weakens to Category 1 intensity about 1,570 mi (2,530 km) west of the southern tip of the Baja California peninsula.

September 9

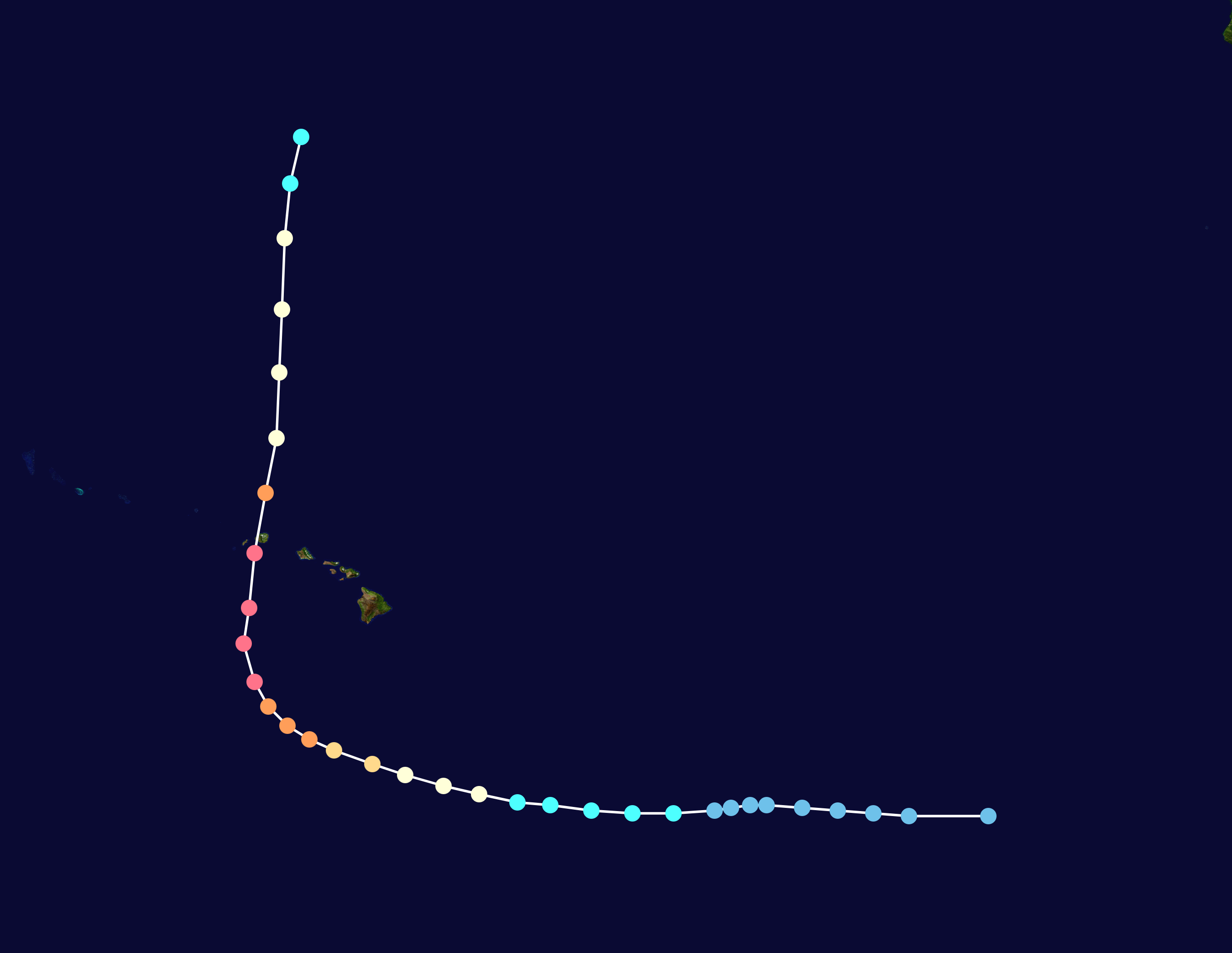
Storm path of Hurricane Iniki

- 06:00 UTC (8:00 p.m. HST, September 8) at 12.7°N 151.6°W – Tropical Storm Iniki strengthens into a Category 1 hurricane about 535 mi (860 km) south-southeast of Hilo.
- 12:00 UTC (5:00 a.m. PDT) at 19.7°N 134.9°W – Hurricane Orlene restrengthens to Category 2 intensity about 1,615 mi (2,600 km) west of the southern tip of the Baja California peninsula.

September 10

- 00:00 UTC (2:00 p.m. HST, September 9) at 13.8°N 155.5°W – Hurricane Iniki strengthens to Category 2 intensity about 410 mi (655 km) south of Hilo.
- 12:00 UTC (2:00 a.m. HST) at 14.7°N 157.8°W – Hurricane Iniki strengthens to Category 3 intensity about 390 mi (630 km) south-southwest of Hilo, making it the seventh major hurricane of the season.
- 18:00 UTC (11:00 a.m. PDT) at 21.8°N 136.1°W – Hurricane Orlene weakens back to Category 1 intensity about 1,670 mi (2,685 km) west of the southern tip of the Baja California peninsula.

September 11

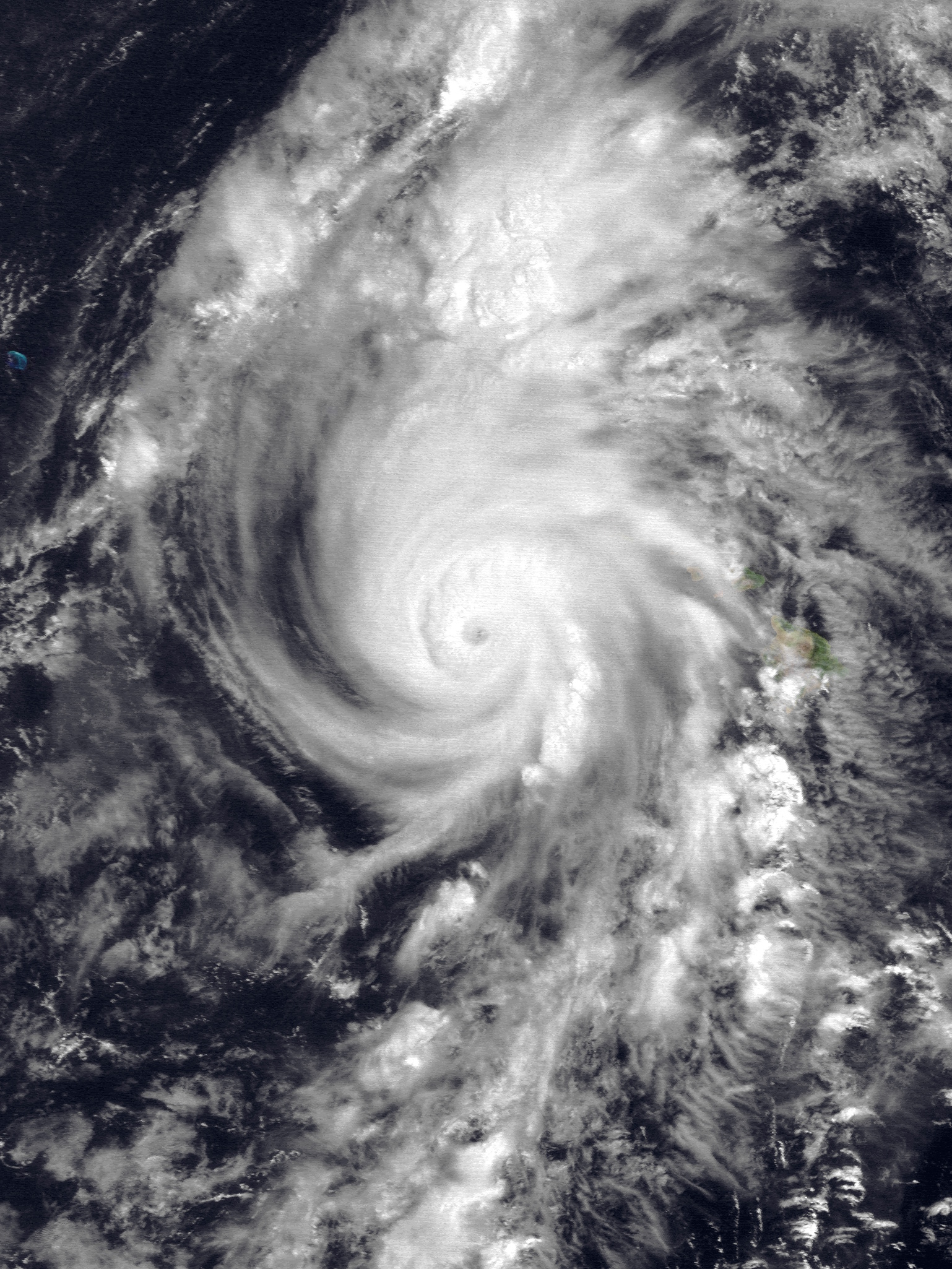
Hurricane Iniki approaching Hawaii at peak intensity late on September 11

- 00:00 UTC (5:00 p.m. PDT, September 10) at 18.7°N 112.8°W – Tropical Depression Nineteen-E forms from a tropical wave about 340 mi (545 km) south-southwest of the southern tip of the Baja California peninsula.
- 06:00 UTC (8:00 p.m. HST, September 10) at 16.8°N 159.8°W – Hurricane Iniki strengthens to Category 4 intensity about 335 mi (535 km) south-southwest of Honolulu, Hawaii.
- 12:00 UTC (5:00 a.m. PDT) at 21.7°N 137.2°W – Hurricane Orlene weakens into a tropical storm about 1,730 mi (2,785 km) west of the southern tip of the Baja California peninsula.
- 18:00 UTC (8:00 a.m. HST) at 19.5°N 160.0°W – Hurricane Iniki attains its peak intensity, with maximum sustained winds of 145 mph (230 km/h) and a minimum central pressure of 938 mbar (27.70 inHg), about 180 mi (285 km) south-southwest of Līhuʻe, Hawaii.
- 18:00 UTC (11:00 a.m. PDT) at 18.2°N 116.4°W – Tropical Depression Nineteen-E strengthens into Tropical Storm Paine about 530 mi (850 km) southwest of the southern tip of the Baja California peninsula.

September 12

- 01:30 UTC (3:30 p.m. HST, September 11), exact location unknown – Hurricane Iniki makes landfall just east of Waimea, Kauaʻi County, Hawaii, with maximum sustained winds of 140 mph (220 km/h) and a central pressure of 945 mbar (27.91 inHg), emerging over water roughly 40 minutes later while moving northward. (Note: Iniki's estimated landfall pressure of 945 mbar (27.91 inHg) was recorded by reconnaissance aircraft roughly 30 minutes prior to landfall, and may not have been the exact central pressure of Iniki at the time of landfall.)
- 06:00 UTC (8:00 p.m. HST, September 11) at 22.6°N 140.0°W – Tropical Storm Orlene crosses 140°W into the Central Pacific basin about 990 mi (1,595 km) east of Hilo.
- 06:00 UTC (8:00 p.m. HST, September 11) at 23.7°N 159.4°W – Hurricane Iniki weakens to Category 3 intensity about 120 mi (195 km) north of Waimea.
- 12:00 UTC (2:00 a.m. HST) at 22.8°N 141.5°W – Tropical Storm Orlene weakens into a tropical depression about 900 mi (1,445 km) east-northeast of Hilo.
- 12:00 UTC (2:00 a.m. HST) at 25.7°N 159.0°W – Hurricane Iniki rapidly weakens to Category 1 intensity about 265 mi (425 km) north of Waimea.

September 13

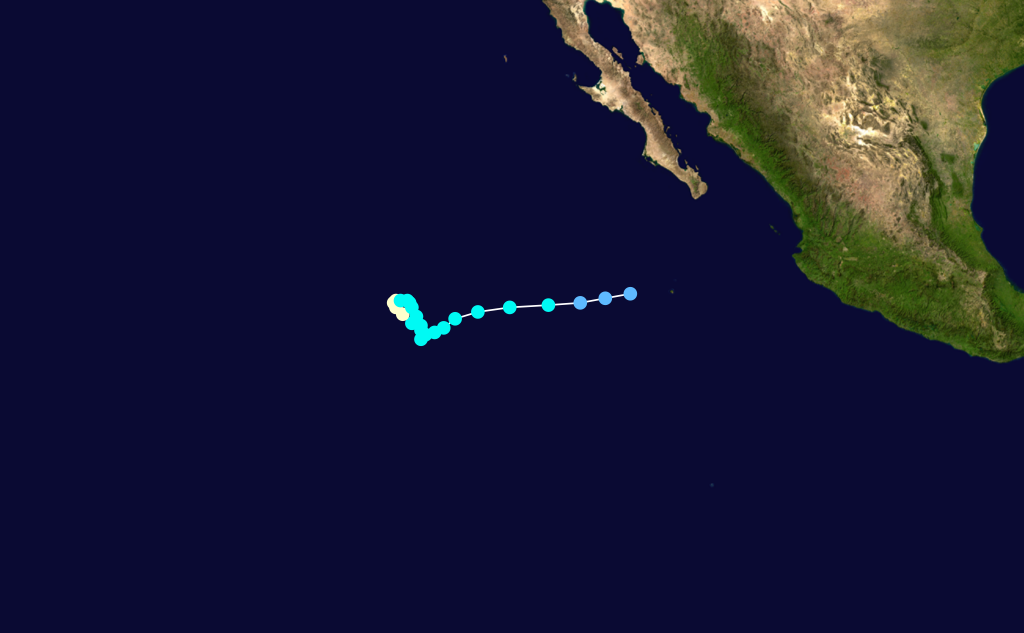

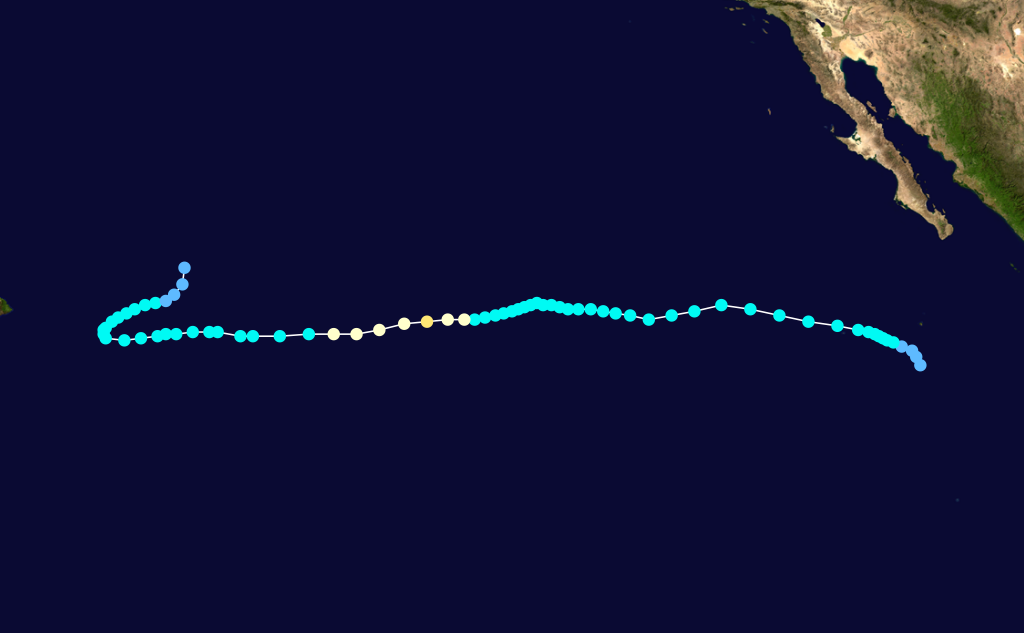
Storm paths of hurricanes Paine (top) and Roslyn (bottom), which interacted with each other during the second week of September

- 12:00 UTC (2:00 a.m. HST) at 35.0°N 158.5°W – Hurricane Iniki weakens into a tropical storm about 905 mi (1,455 km) north of Waimea.
- 12:00 UTC (5:00 a.m. PDT) at 16.8°N 111.0°W – Tropical Depression Twenty-E forms from a tropical wave about 425 mi (685 km) south of the southern tip of the Baja California peninsula.
- 18:00 UTC (8:00 a.m. HST) at 36.7°N 158.1°W – Tropical Storm Iniki is last noted as a tropical cyclone about 1,025 mi (1,650 km) north of Waimea, transitioning into an extratropical cyclone shortly thereafter.
- 18:00 UTC (11:00 a.m. PDT) at 17.8°N 122.8°W – Tropical Storm Paine strengthens into a Category 1 hurricane about 905 mi (1,455 km) west-southwest of the southern tip of the Baja California peninsula. It simultaneously attains its peak intensity, with maximum sustained winds of 75 mph (120 km/h) and a minimum central pressure of 987 mbar (29.15 inHg).

September 14

- 12:00 UTC (5:00 a.m. PDT) at 17.9°N 112.3°W – Tropical Depression Twenty-E strengthens into Tropical Storm Roslyn about 375 mi (600 km) south-southwest of the southern tip of the Baja California peninsula.
- Exact time and location unknown – Tropical Depression Orlene makes landfall in the district of Kaʻū, Hawaii, with maximum sustained winds of 30 mph (45 km/h) and a central pressure of 1010 mbar (29.83 inHg).
- 18:00 UTC (8:00 a.m. HST) at 19.2°N 155.2°W – Tropical Depression Orlene is last noted as a tropical cyclone over land about 35 mi (55 km) south of Hilo, dissipating shortly thereafter.
- 18:00 UTC (11:00 a.m. PDT) at 18.4°N 122.9°W – Hurricane Paine weakens into a tropical storm about 890 mi (1,435 km) west-southwest of the southern tip of the Baja California peninsula.

September 16

- 18:00 UTC (11:00 a.m. PDT) at 16.9°N 122.0°W – Tropical Storm Paine dissipates when Tropical Storm Roslyn absorbs it about 885 mi (1,425 km) west-southwest of the southern tip of the Baja California peninsula.

September 17

- 12:00 UTC (5:00 a.m. PDT) at 16.9°N 107.7°W – Tropical Depression Twenty-One-E forms from a tropical wave about 435 mi (705 km) south-southeast of the southern tip of the Baja California peninsula.
- 12:00 UTC (5:00 a.m. PDT) at 10.4°N 98.5°W – Tropical Depression Twenty-Two-E forms from a tropical wave about 455 mi (730 km) south of Acapulco.

September 18

- 00:00 UTC (5:00 p.m. PDT) at 18.6°N 109.1°W – Tropical Depression Twenty-One-E strengthens into Tropical Storm Seymour about 300 mi (480 km) south of the southern tip of the Baja California peninsula.
- 18:00 UTC (11:00 a.m. PDT) at 10.8°N 101.3°W – Tropical Depression Twenty-Two-E strengthens into Tropical Storm Tina about 430 mi (695 km) south-southwest of Acapulco.

September 19

- 12:00 UTC (5:00 a.m. PDT) at 20.5°N 113.0°W – Tropical Storm Seymour strengthens into a Category 1 hurricane about 255 mi (405 km) southwest of the southern tip of the Baja California peninsula.

September 20

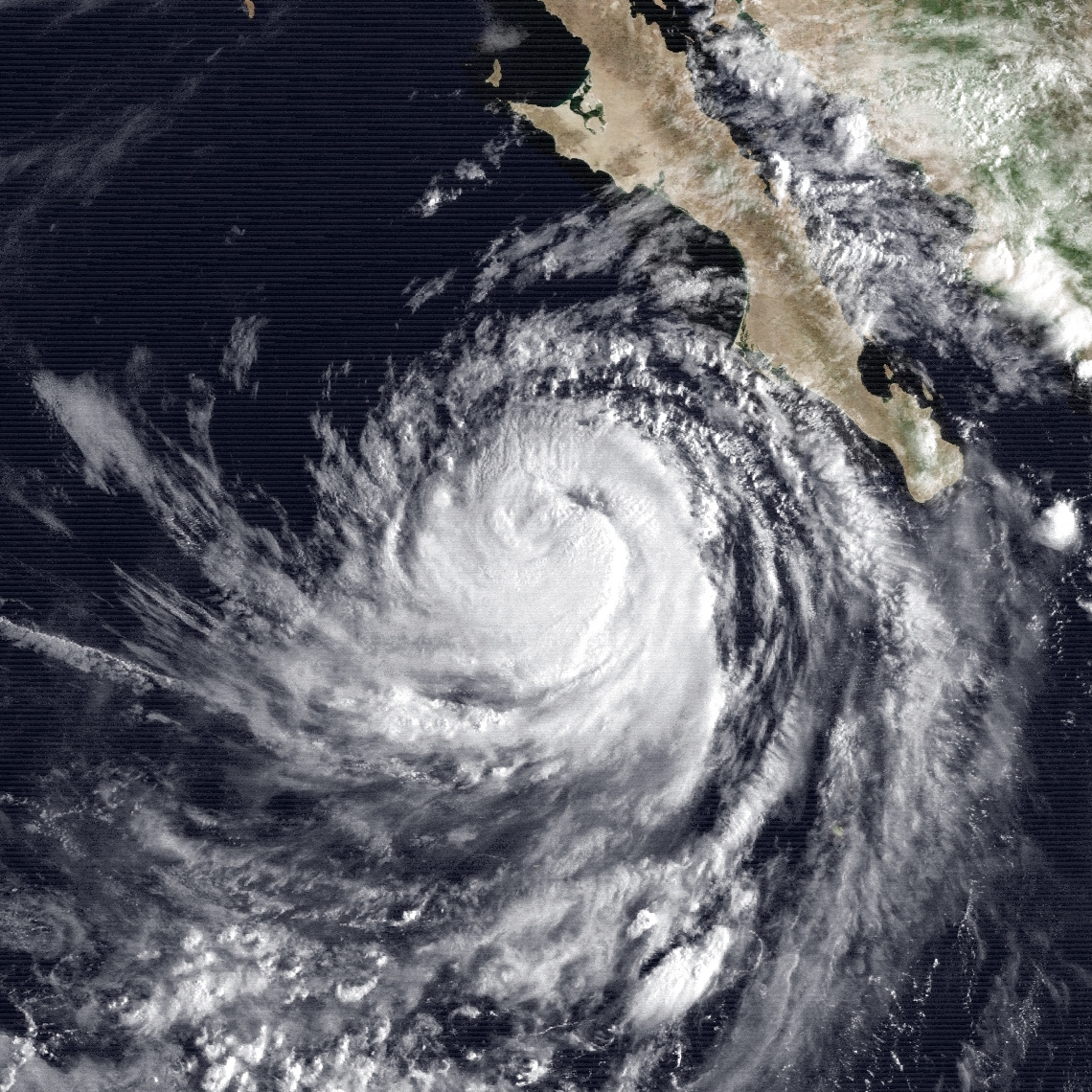
Hurricane Seymour just after peak intensity on September 20

- 12:00 UTC (5:00 a.m. PDT) at 22.3°N 114.3°W – Hurricane Seymour attains its peak intensity, with maximum sustained winds of 85 mph (140 km/h) and a minimum central pressure of 980 mbar (28.94 inHg), about 280 mi (455 km) west of the southern tip of the Baja California peninsula.

September 21

- 00:00 UTC (5:00 p.m. PDT, September 20) at 11.5°N 106.7°W – Tropical Storm Tina strengthens into a Category 1 hurricane about 585 mi (945 km) southwest of Acapulco.
- 06:00 UTC (11:00 p.m. PDT, September 20) at 23.4°N 115.5°W – Hurricane Seymour weakens into a tropical storm about 350 mi (565 km) west of the southern tip of the Baja California peninsula.

September 22

- 00:00 UTC (5:00 p.m. PDT, September 21) at 12.1°N 107.7°W – Hurricane Tina weakens into a tropical storm about 615 mi (990 km) west-southwest of Acapulco.
- 18:00 UTC (11:00 a.m. PDT) at 19.0°N 133.0°W – Tropical Storm Roslyn strengthens into a Category 1 hurricane about 1,510 mi (2,425 km) west of the southern tip of the Baja California peninsula.
- 18:00 UTC (11:00 a.m. PDT) at 24.0°N 119.3°W – Tropical Storm Seymour restrengthens into a Category 1 hurricane about 600 mi (965 km) west of the southern tip of the Baja California peninsula.

September 23

- 06:00 UTC (11:00 p.m. PDT, September 22) at 18.9°N 134.8°W – Hurricane Roslyn strengthens to Category 2 intensity about 1,625 mi (2,610 km) west of the southern tip of the Baja California peninsula. It simultaneously attains its peak intensity, with maximum sustained winds of 100 mph (155 km/h) and a minimum central pressure of 975 mbar (28.79 inHg).
- 06:00 UTC (11:00 p.m. PDT, September 22) at 12.3°N 109.4°W – Tropical Storm Tina restrengthens into a Category 1 hurricane about 710 mi (1,140 km) west-southwest of Acapulco.
- 12:00 UTC (5:00 a.m. PDT) at 18.8°N 135.9°W – Hurricane Roslyn weakens to Category 1 intensity about 1,695 mi (2,730 km) west of the southern tip of the Baja California peninsula.
- 18:00 UTC (11:00 a.m. PDT) at 24.5°N 121.4°W – Hurricane Seymour weakens back into a tropical storm about 730 mi (1,175 km) west of the southern tip of the Baja California peninsula.

September 24

- 12:00 UTC (2:00 a.m. HST) at 18.3°N 140.5°W – Hurricane Roslyn weakens into a tropical storm as it crosses 140°W into the Central Pacific basin about 955 mi (1,535 km) east of Hilo.

September 25

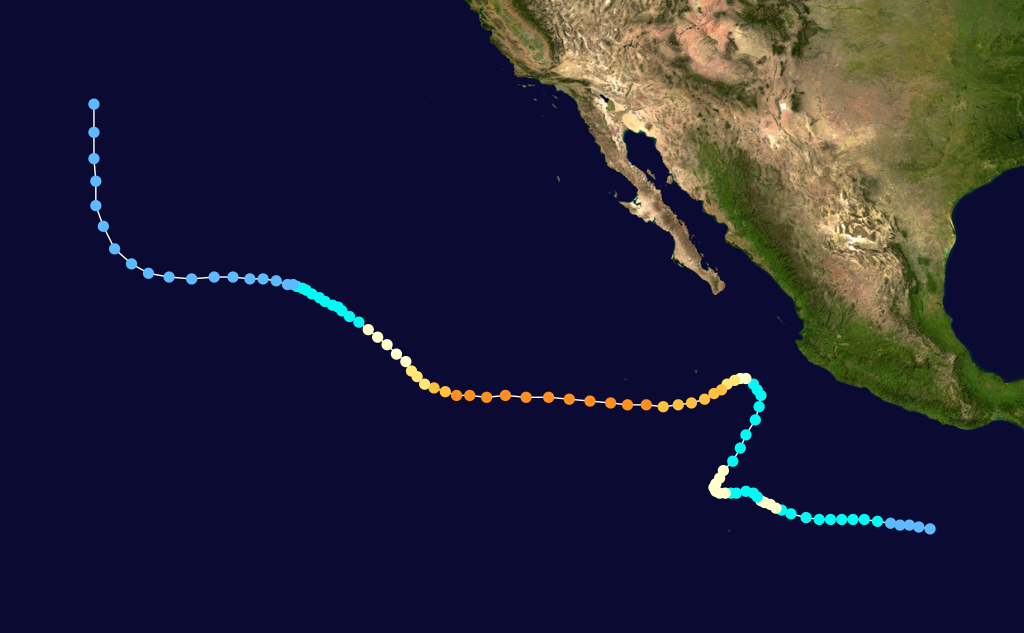
Storm path of Hurricane Tina, which was the longest-lived North Pacific tropical cyclone at the time

- 00:00 UTC (5:00 p.m. PDT, September 24) at 14.0°N 109.0°W – Hurricane Tina weakens into a tropical storm for the second time about 615 mi (990 km) south of the southern tip of the Baja California peninsula.
- 12:00 UTC (5:00 a.m. PDT) at 21.8°N 124.3°W – Tropical Storm Seymour weakens into a tropical depression about 920 mi (1,480 km) west of the southern tip of the Baja California peninsula.

September 26

- 18:00 UTC (8:00 a.m. HST) at 14.7°N 179.0°W – The Joint Typhoon Warning Center (JTWC) begins tracking Tropical Depression Twenty-One-W over the extreme southwestern Central Pacific basin, as it is not expected to become a significant tropical cyclone until after crossing the IDL.

September 27

- 00:00 UTC (5:00 p.m. PDT, September 26) at 18.4°N 108.3°W – Tropical Storm Tina restrengthens into a Category 1 hurricane for the second time about 330 mi (530 km) south-southeast of the southern tip of the Baja California peninsula.
- 00:00 UTC (2:00 p.m. HST, September 26) at 15.1°N 180°E – The JTWC reports that Tropical Depression Twenty-One-W has crossed the IDL while strengthening into a tropical storm. The system later becomes Typhoon Ward of the annual Pacific typhoon season.
- 12:00 UTC (5:00 a.m. PDT) at 24.2°N 129.0°W – Tropical Depression Seymour dissipates about 1,210 mi (1,945 km) west of the southern tip of the Baja California peninsula.
- 12:00 UTC (5:00 a.m. PDT) at 18.3°N 108.9°W – Hurricane Tina strengthens to Category 2 intensity about 320 mi (520 km) south of the southern tip of the Baja California peninsula.

September 28

- 00:00 UTC (5:00 p.m. PDT, September 27) at 17.8°N 109.6°W – Hurricane Tina strengthens to Category 3 intensity about 350 mi (565 km) south of the southern tip of the Baja California peninsula, making it the eighth major hurricane of the season.

September 29

- 12:00 UTC (5:00 a.m. PDT) at 17.0°N 113.6°W – Hurricane Tina strengthens to Category 4 intensity about 470 mi (760 km) south-southwest of the southern tip of the Baja California peninsula.

September 30

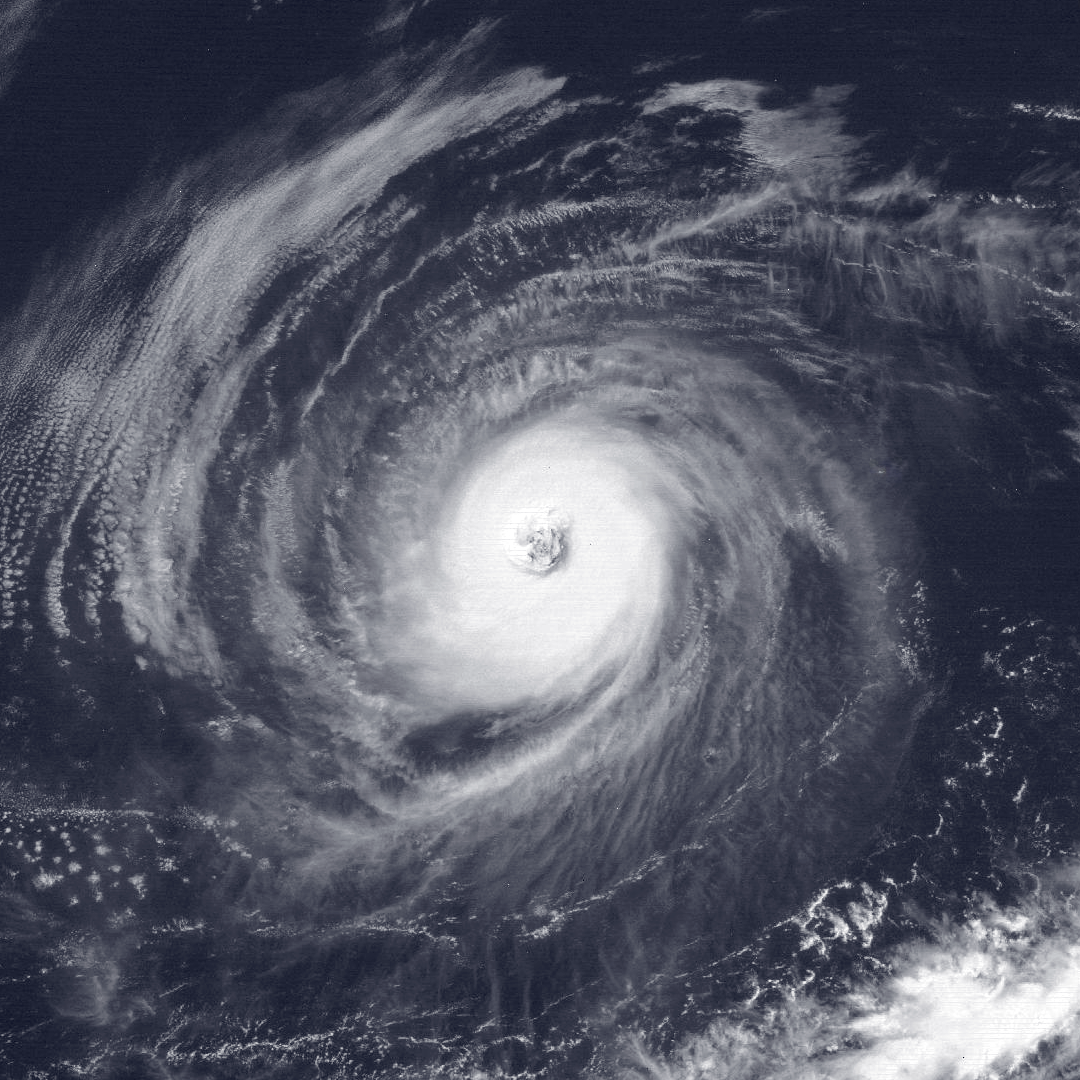
Hurricane Tina near peak intensity late on September 30

- 00:00 UTC (2:00 p.m. HST, September 29) at 19.9°N 147.4°W (Note: HURDAT places Roslyn at 20.0°N 147.2°W, or about 510 mi (825 km) east of Hilo.) – Tropical Storm Roslyn weakens into a tropical depression about 500 mi (805 km) east of Hilo. (Note: HURDAT maintains Roslyn as a tropical storm through 12:00 UTC (2:00 a.m. HST) on September 30.)
- 12:00 UTC (5:00 a.m. PDT) at 17.3°N 117.7°W – Hurricane Tina attains its peak intensity, with maximum sustained winds of 150 mph (240 km/h) and a minimum central pressure of 932 mbar (27.52 inHg), about 635 mi (1,020 km) southwest of the southern tip of the Baja California peninsula, making it the strongest storm of the season.
- 18:00 UTC (8:00 a.m. HST) at 21.5°N 146.5°W – Tropical Depression Roslyn is last noted as a tropical cyclone about 570 mi (915 km) east-northeast of Hilo, dissipating shortly thereafter.

=== October ===
October 1

- 06:00 UTC (11:00 p.m. PDT, September 30) at 13.5°N 100.4°W – Tropical Depression Twenty-Three-E forms from a tropical wave about 460 mi (740 km) southeast of Manzanillo.
- 18:00 UTC (11:00 a.m. PDT) at 14.4°N 101.1°W – Tropical Depression Twenty-Three-E strengthens into Tropical Storm Virgil about 385 mi (620 km) southeast of Manzanillo.

October 2

- 06:00 UTC (11:00 p.m. PDT, October 1) at 17.7°N 124.3°W – Hurricane Tina weakens to Category 3 intensity about 995 mi (1,600 km) west-southwest of the southern tip of the Baja California peninsula.
- 12:00 UTC (5:00 a.m. PDT) at 15.4°N 102.5°W – Tropical Storm Virgil strengthens into a Category 1 hurricane about 280 mi (455 km) south-southeast of Manzanillo.
- 18:00 UTC (11:00 a.m. PDT) at 18.1°N 125.4°W – Hurricane Tina weakens to Category 2 intensity about 1,055 mi (1,695 km) west-southwest of the southern tip of the Baja California peninsula.
- 18:00 UTC (11:00 a.m. PDT) at 15.6°N 102.6°W – Hurricane Virgil strengthens to Category 2 intensity about 265 mi (425 km) south-southeast of Manzanillo.

October 3

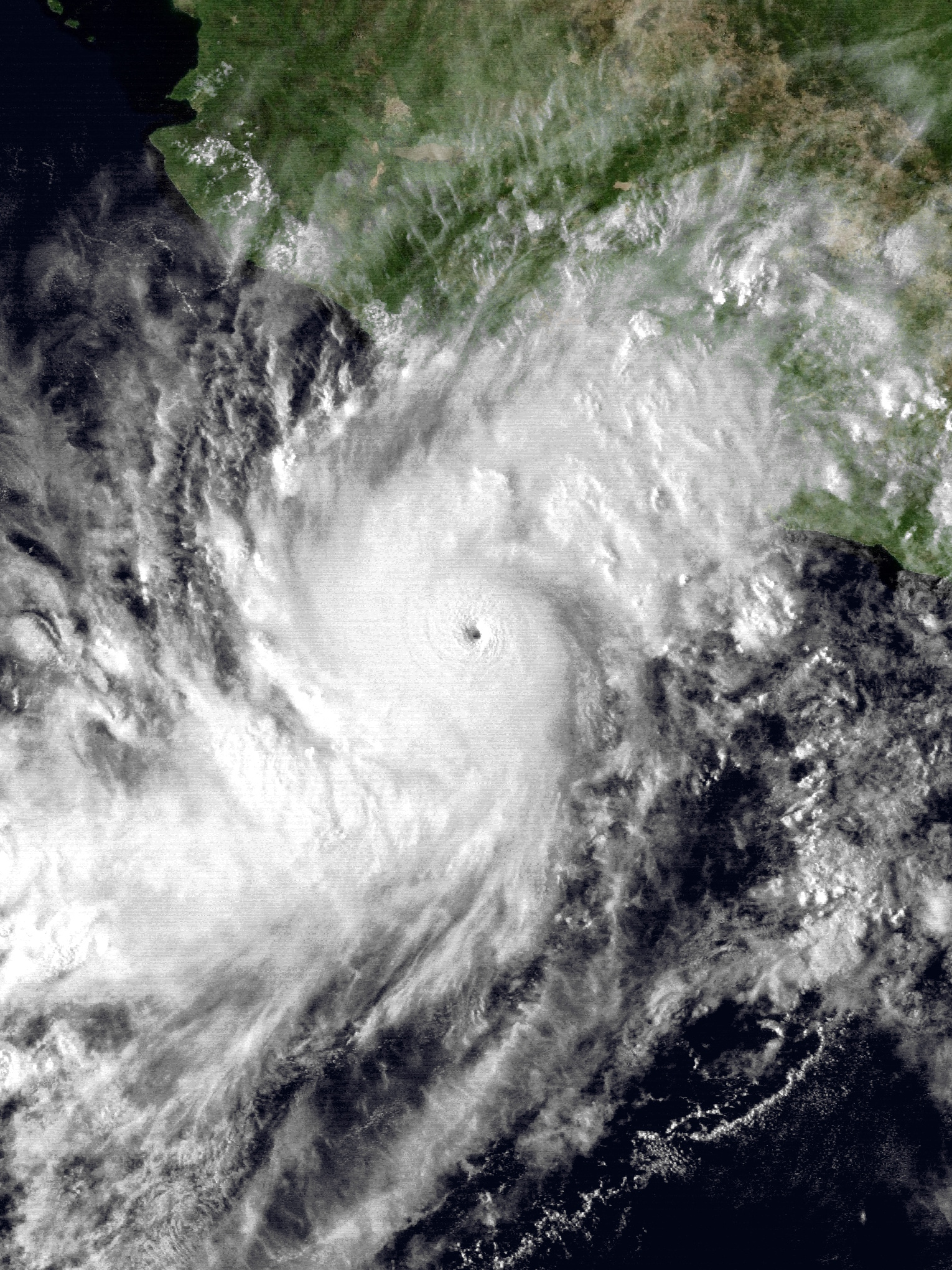
Hurricane Virgil shortly before peak intensity late on October 2

- 00:00 UTC (5:00 p.m. PDT, October 2) at 15.9°N 102.6°W – Hurricane Virgil rapidly strengthens to Category 4 intensity about 245 mi (400 km) south-southeast of Manzanillo, making it the ninth major hurricane of the season. It simultaneously attains its peak intensity, with maximum sustained winds of 130 mph (215 km/h) and a minimum central pressure of 948 mbar (27.99 inHg).
- 06:00 UTC (11:00 p.m. PDT, October 2) at 16.3°N 102.7°W – Hurricane Virgil weakens to Category 3 intensity about 220 mi (350 km) south-southeast of Manzanillo.
- 12:00 UTC (5:00 a.m. PDT) at 19.3°N 126.4°W – Hurricane Tina weakens to Category 1 intensity about 1,085 mi (1,750 km) west-southwest of the southern tip of the Baja California peninsula.

October 4

- 00:00 UTC (5:00 p.m. PDT, October 3) at 18.1°N 103.2°W – Hurricane Virgil weakens to Category 2 intensity about 70 mi (110 km) west of Lázaro Cárdenas, Michoacán.
- 03:00 UTC (8:00 p.m. PDT, October 3) at 18.3°N 103.5°W – Hurricane Virgil makes landfall near Punta San Telmo, or about 85 mi (140 km) west-northwest of Lázaro Cárdenas, with maximum sustained winds of 110 mph (175 km/h) and a central pressure of 960 mbar (28.35 inHg).
- 06:00 UTC (11:00 p.m. PDT, October 3) at 18.6°N 103.7°W – Hurricane Virgil weakens to Category 1 intensty over land about 50 mi (85 km) southeast of Manzanillo.
- 12:00 UTC (5:00 a.m. PDT) at 19.2°N 104.2°W – Hurricane Virgil weakens into a tropical storm over land near Manzanillo.
- 18:00 UTC (11:00 a.m. PDT) at 21.4°N 128.9°W – Hurricane Tina weakens into a tropical storm for the third and final time about 1,215 mi (1,955 km) west of the southern tip of the Baja California peninsula.
- 18:00 UTC (11:00 a.m. PDT) at 19.6°N 104.5°W – Tropical Storm Virgil weakens into a tropical depression over land about 40 mi (65 km) north-northwest of Manzanillo, and later emerges back over the Pacific Ocean.

October 5

- 18:00 UTC (11:00 a.m. PDT) at 20.6°N 107.6°W – Tropical Depression Virgil dissipates about 220 mi (350 km) southeast of the southern tip of the Baja California peninsula. (Note: HURDAT maintains Virgil as a tropical depression at 18:00 UTC (11:00 a.m. PDT) on October 5.)

October 6

- 12:00 UTC (5:00 a.m. PDT) at 11.0°N 97.0°W – Tropical Depression Twenty-Four-E forms from an area of unsettled weather about 450 mi (720 km) south-southeast of Acapulco.

October 7

- 06:00 UTC (11:00 p.m. PDT, October 6) at 12.5°N 100.9°W – Tropical Depression Twenty-Four-E strengthens into Tropical Storm Winifred about 355 mi (575 km) south of Zihuatanejo.
- 12:00 UTC (5:00 a.m. PDT) at 23.4°N 132.4°W – Tropical Storm Tina weakens into a tropical storm about 1,420 mi (2,285 km) west of the southern tip of the Baja California peninsula.

October 8

- 12:00 UTC (5:00 a.m. PDT) at 14.9°N 103.3°W – Tropical Storm Winifred strengthens into a Category 1 hurricane about 295 mi (470 km) south-southeast of Manzanillo.

October 9

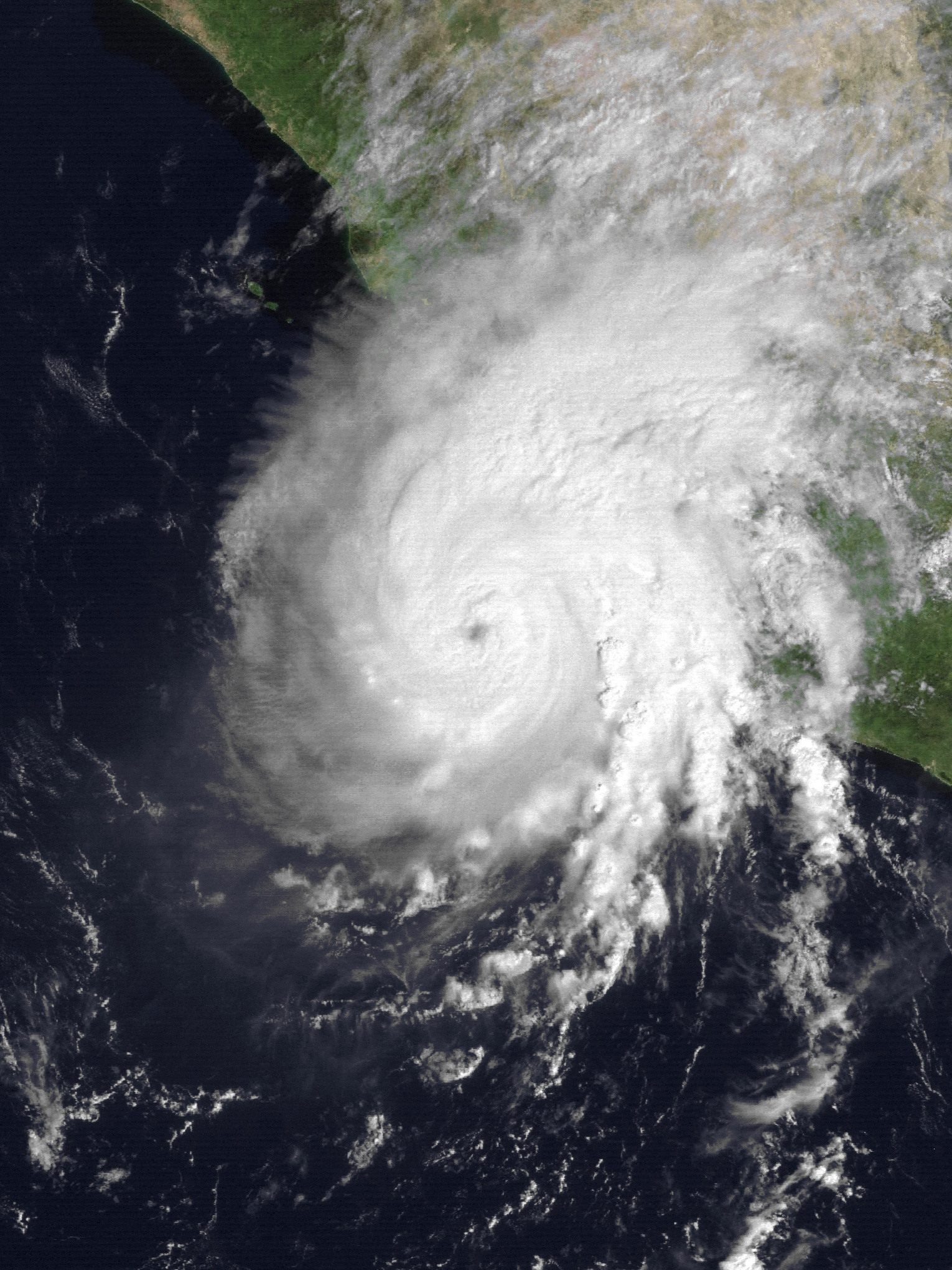
Hurricane Winifred near peak intensity on October 9

- 00:00 UTC (5:00 p.m. PDT, October 8) at 16.0°N 104.0°W – Hurricane Winifred strengthens to Category 2 intensity about 215 mi (345 km) south of Manzanillo.
- 12:00 UTC (5:00 a.m. PDT) at 17.5°N 104.3°W – Hurricane Winifred strengthens to Category 3 intensity about 110 mi (175 km) south of Manzanillo, making it the tenth and final major hurricane of the season. It simultaneously attains its peak intensity, with maximum sustained winds of 115 mph (185 km/h) and a minimum central pressure of 960 mbar (28.35 inHg).
- 18:00 UTC (8:00 a.m. HST) at 24.0°N 140.1°W – Tropical Depression Tina crosses 140°W into the Central Pacific basin about 1,005 mi (1,620 km) east-northeast of Hilo.
- 18:00 UTC (11:00 a.m. PDT) at 18.6°N 104.4°W – Hurricane Winifred weakens to Category 2 intensity about 35 mi (55 km) south of Manzanillo.
- 20:30 UTC (1:30 p.m. PDT) at 19.1°N 104.3°W – Hurricane Winifred makes landfall near Manzanillo with maximum sustained winds of 100 mph (155 km/h) and a central pressure of 975 mbar (28.79 inHg).

October 10

- 00:00 UTC (5:00 p.m. PDT, October 9) at 20.0°N 103.7°W – Hurricane Winifred rapidly weakens into a tropical storm over land about 75 mi (120 km) north-northeast of Manzanillo.
- 06:00 UTC (11:00 p.m. PDT, October 9) at 21.7°N 102.4°W – Tropical Storm Winifred weakens into a tropical depression over land about 220 mi (350 km) northeast of Manzanillo, dissipating shortly thereafter.

October 11

- 18:00 UTC (8:00 a.m. HST) at 33.0°N 143.0°W – Tropical Depression Tina is last noted as a tropical cyclone about 1,180 mi (1,900 km) northeast of Hilo, dissipating shortly thereafter.

October 13

- 18:00 UTC (11:00 a.m. PDT) at 10.2°N 106.6°W – Tropical Depression Twenty-Five-E forms from a tropical wave about 905 mi (1,455 km) south-southeast of the southern tip of the Baja California peninsula.

October 14

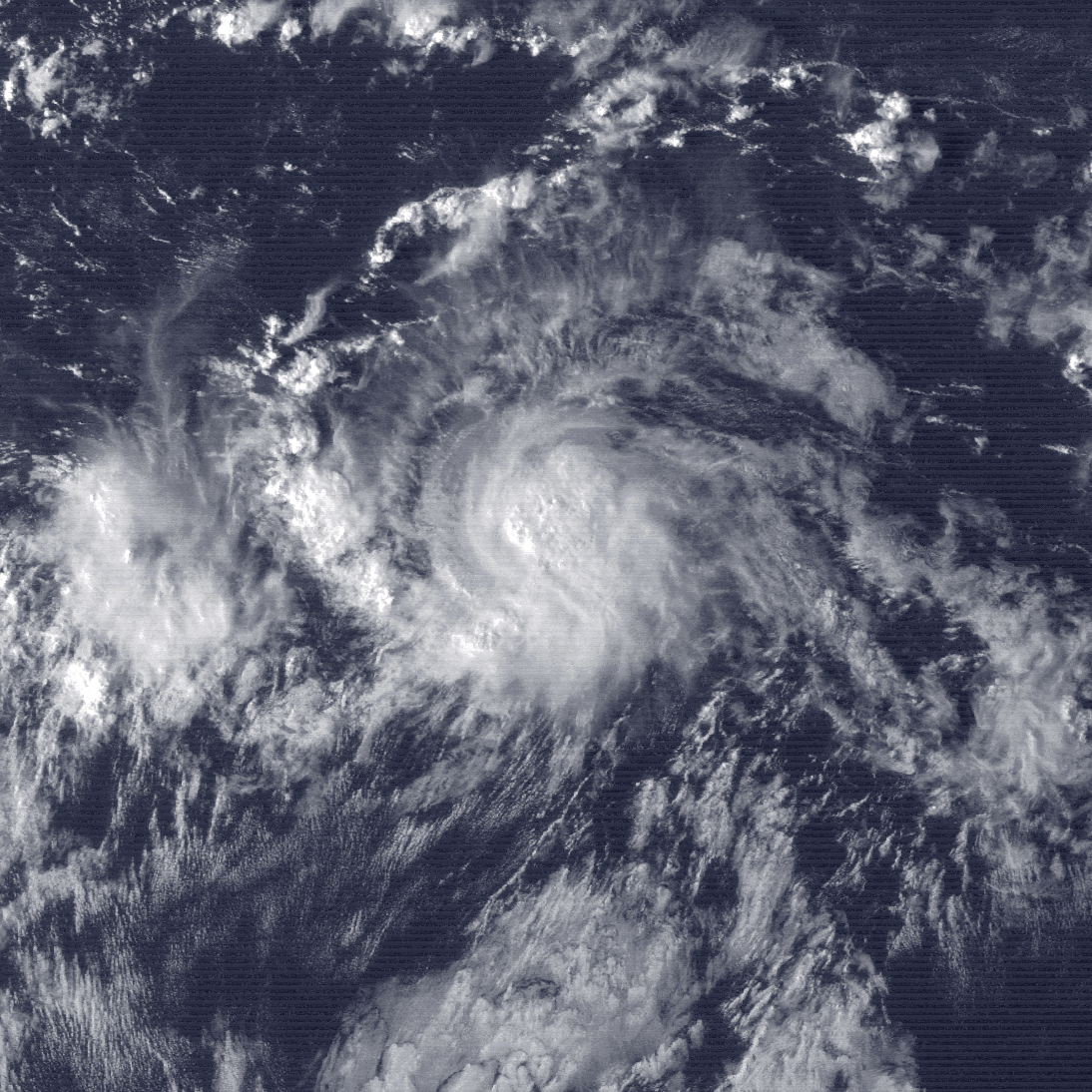
Tropical Storm Xavier shortly before peak intensity late on October 13

- 00:00 UTC (5:00 p.m. PDT, October 13) at 10.2°N 107.6°W – Tropical Depression Twenty-Five-E strengthens into Tropical Storm Xavier about 885 mi (1,425 km) south of the southern tip of the Baja California peninsula. It simultaneously attains its peak intensity, with maximum sustained winds of 45 mph (75 km/h) and a minimum central pressure of 1003 mbar (29.62 inHg).
- 18:00 UTC (11:00 a.m. PDT) at 10.2°N 111.3°W – Tropical Storm Xavier weakens into a tropical depression about 880 mi (1,415 km) south of the southern tip of the Baja California peninsula.

October 15

- 06:00 UTC (11:00 p.m. PDT, October 14) at 10.5°N 113.5°W – Tropical Depression Xavier dissipates about 885 mi (1,425 km) south-southwest of the southern tip of the Baja California peninsula.
- 18:00 UTC (11:00 a.m. PDT) at 10.8°N 107.2°W – Tropical Depression Twenty-Six-E forms from a tropical wave about 605 mi (970 km) south-southwest of Manzanillo.

October 16

- 06:00 UTC (11:00 p.m. PDT, October 15) at 10.9°N 111.1°W – Tropical Depression Twenty-Six-E strengthens into Tropical Storm Yolanda about 720 mi (1,160 km) southwest of Manzanillo.

October 19

- 00:00 UTC (5:00 p.m. PDT, October 18) at 16.2°N 130.3°W – Tropical Storm Yolanda attains its peak intensity, with maximum sustained winds of 65 mph (100 km/h) and a minimum central pressure of 993 mbar (29.32 inHg), about 1,400 mi (2,250 km) west-southwest of the southern tip of the Baja California peninsula.

October 20

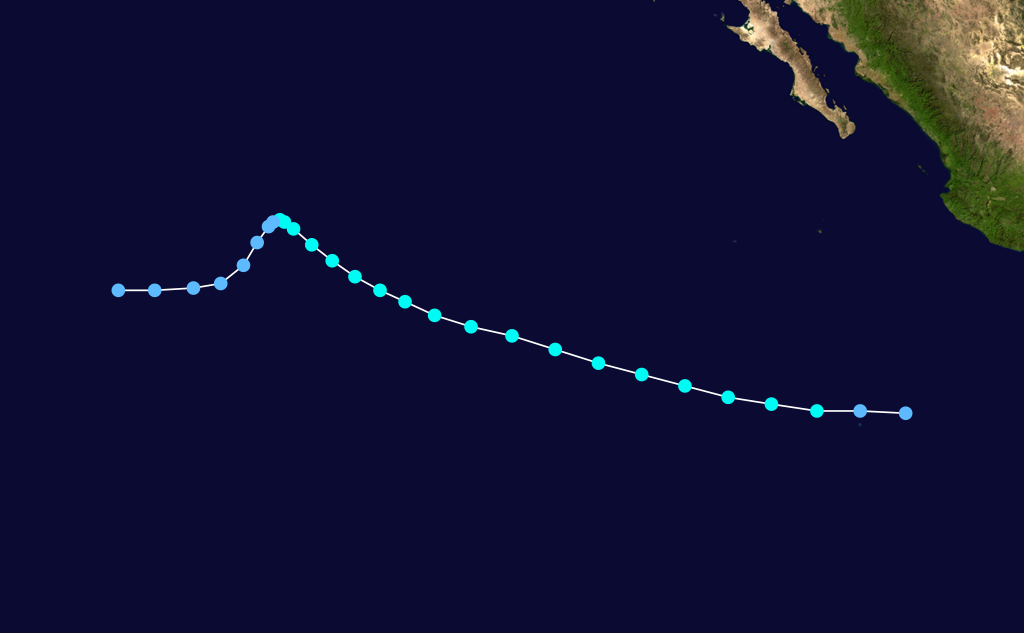
Storm path of Tropical Storm Yolanda

- 18:00 UTC (11:00 a.m. PDT) at 19.2°N 135.0°W – Tropical Storm Yolanda weakens into a tropical depression about 1,635 mi (2,630 km) west of the southern tip of the Baja California peninsula.

October 22

- 12:00 UTC (2:00 a.m. HST) at 16.2°N 141.2°W (Note: HURDAT places Yolanda at 16.2°N 141.8°W, or about 905 mi (1,455 km) east-southeast of Hilo.) – Tropical Depression Yolanda crosses 140°W into the Central Pacific basin about 945 mi (1,520 km) east-southeast of Hilo, dissipating shortly thereafter. (Note: According to HURDAT, Yolanda entered the Central Pacific basin six hours earlier at 06:00 UTC on October 22 (8:00 p.m. HST on October 21).)

October 24

- 18:00 UTC (8:00 a.m. HST) at 10.7°N 177.6°W – The JTWC begins tracking Tropical Depression Twenty-Seven-W over the extreme southwestern Central Pacific basin, as it is not expected to become a significant tropical cyclone until after it crosses the IDL.

October 25

- 12:00 UTC (2:00 a.m. HST) at 12.6°N 179.7°E – The JTWC reports that Tropical Depression Twenty-Seven-W has crossed the IDL while strengthening into a tropical storm. The system later becomes Typhoon Dan of the annual Pacific typhoon season.
- 12:00 UTC (4:00 a.m. PST) (Note: Daylight saving time ended on October 25, 1998. At 2:00 a.m. PDT, clocks were moved back to 1:00 a.m. PST.) at 12.6°N 111.4°W – Tropical Depression Twenty-Seven-E forms from a tropical wave about 715 mi (1,150 km) south of the southern tip of the Baja California peninsula.

October 26

- 00:00 UTC (4:00 p.m. PST, October 25) at 13.4°N 113.1°W – Tropical Depression Twenty-Seven-E strengthens into Tropical Storm Zeke about 685 mi (1,100 km) south-southwest of the southern tip of the Baja California peninsula.

October 27

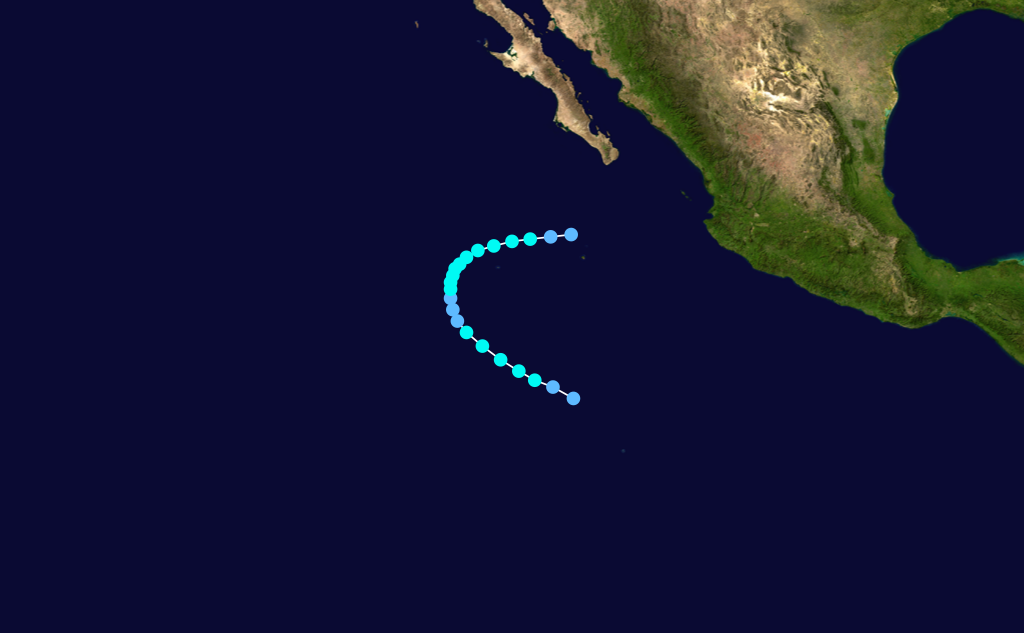
Storm path of Tropical Storm Zeke

- 06:00 UTC (10:00 p.m. PST, October 26) at 16.0°N 116.5°W – Tropical Storm Zeke weakens into a tropical depression about 640 mi (1,030 km) southwest of the southern tip of the Baja California peninsula.

October 28

- 00:00 UTC (4:00 p.m. PST, October 27) at 17.4°N 116.8°W – Tropical Depression Zeke restrengthens into a tropical storm about 580 mi (935 km) southwest of the southern tip of the Baja California peninsula.

October 29

- 18:00 UTC (10:00 a.m. PST) at 19.3°N 114.9°W – Tropical Storm Zeke attains its peak intensity, with maximum sustained winds of 50 mph (85 km/h) and a minimum central pressure of 1000 mbar (29.53 inHg), about 405 mi (650 km) southwest of the southern tip of the Baja California peninsula.

October 30

- 12:00 UTC (4:00 a.m. PST) at 19.7°N 112.4°W – Tropical Storm Zeke again weakens into a tropical depression about 270 mi (435 km) southwest of the southern tip of the Baja California peninsula.
- 18:00 UTC (10:00 a.m. PST) at 19.8°N 111.5°W – Tropical Depression Zeke dissipates about 235 mi (380 km) south-southwest of the southern tip of the Baja California peninsula. (Note: HURDAT maintains Zeke as a tropical depression at 18:00 UTC (10:00 a.m. PST) on October 30, terminating it afterwards.)

=== November ===
November 22

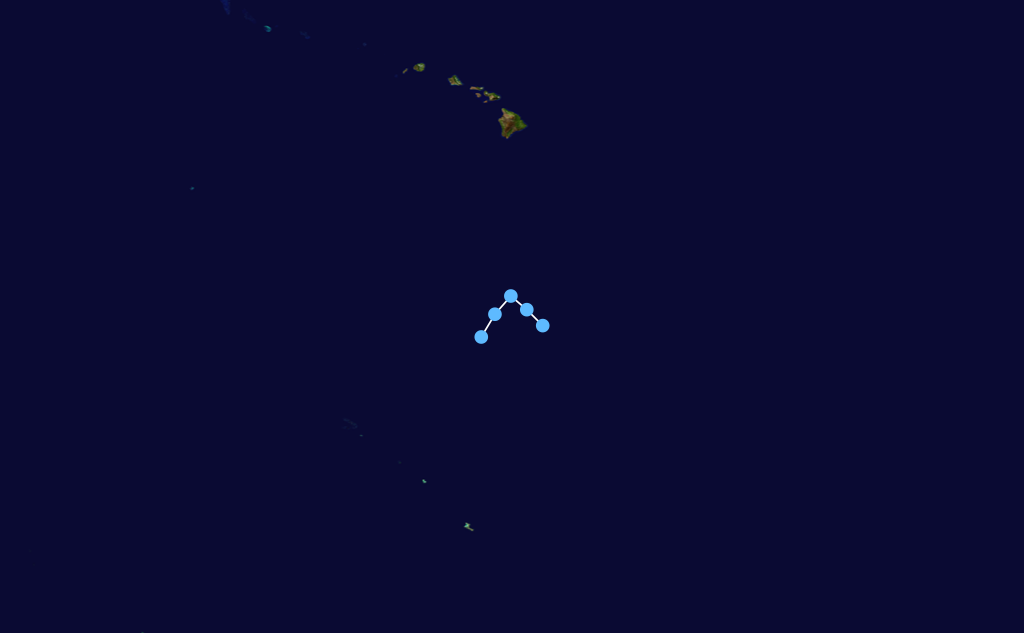
Storm path of Tropical Depression Three-C

- 00:00 UTC (2:00 p.m. HST, November 21) at 10.7°N 154.1°W – Tropical Depression Three-C forms from an area of unsettled weather about 625 mi (1,010 km) south of Hilo. It is already at its peak intensity, with maximum sustained winds of 35 mph (55 km/h) and an unknown minimum central pressure.

November 23

- 00:00 UTC (2:00 p.m. HST, November 22) at 10.2°N 156.8°W – Tropical Depression Three-C is last noted as a tropical cyclone about 665 mi (1,075 km) south of Hilo, dissipating shortly thereafter.

November 30

- The 1992 Pacific hurricane season officially ends.

== See also ==
- Timeline of the 1992 Atlantic hurricane season
- Tropical cyclones in 1992
- List of Pacific hurricane records
