= Roberto Reyes =

Roberto Reyes may refer to:

- Roberto Reyes Barreiro (1871–1928), Mexican physician, author and political leader
- Roberto Reyes (footballer) (Roberto Andrés Reyes Loyola, born 1988), Chilean footballer
- Roberto Reyes Pérez, Mexican muralist, worked with Máximo Pacheco Miranda in Puebla
- Roberto Reyes Toledo, (1949–2020), Colombian actor, scriptwriter and director, directed Al ritmo de tu corazón
- Roberto Reyes Concepcion (1903–1987), Chief Justice of the Supreme Court of the Philippines
- Roberto Nielsen-Reyes (born 1943), Bolivian equestrian
