= José Azueta (disambiguation) =

There are a few things named José Azueta:

- Lt. José Azueta Abad of the Mexican Navy, slain in the 1914 United States occupation of Veracruz

Two municipalities named for him:

- José Azueta, Guerrero
- José Azueta, Veracruz
