= Zihuatanejo =

City in the Mexican state of Guerrero

Zihuatanejo Ixtapa-Zihuatanejo
- City
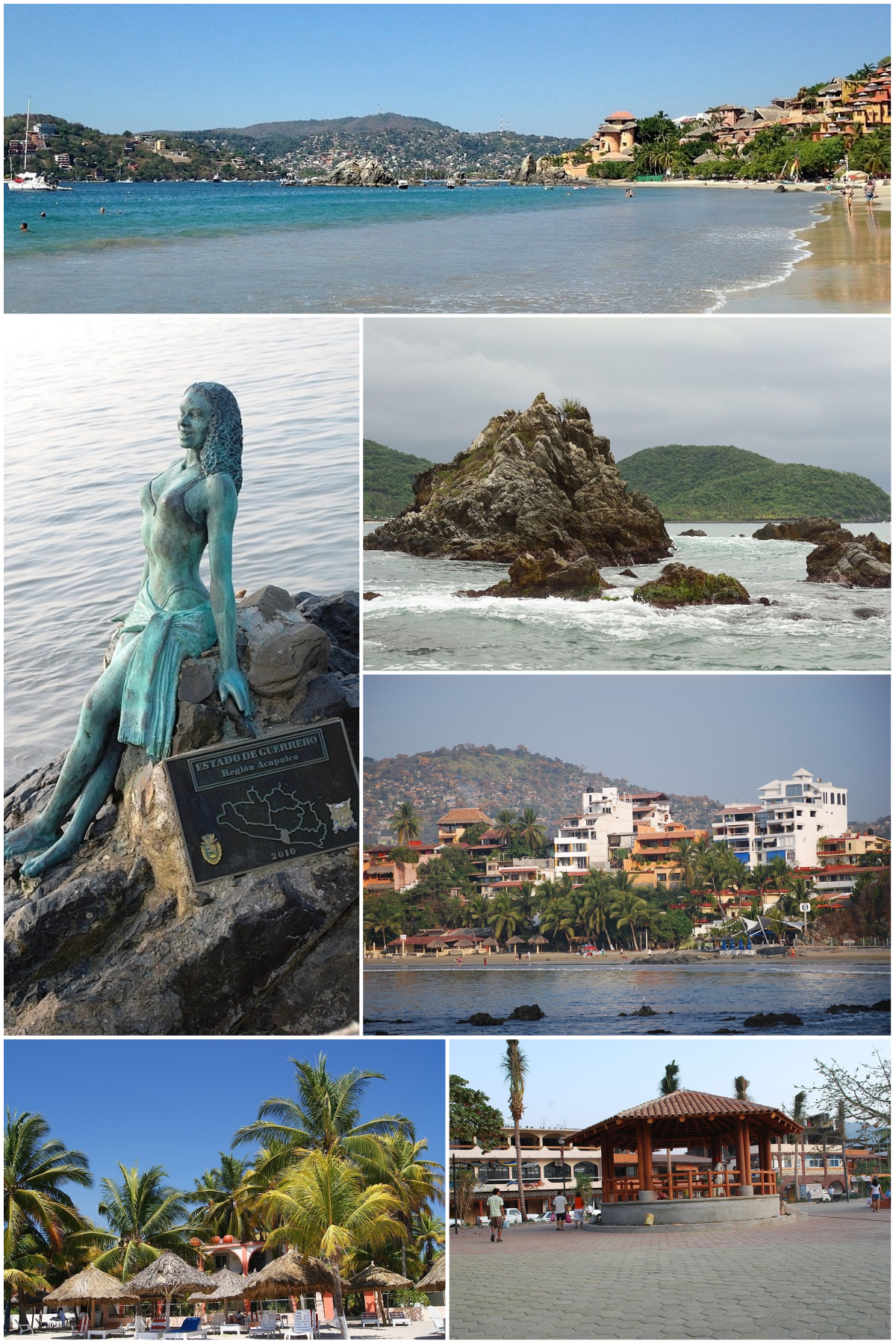
- Above, from left to right: Panoramic beach 'La Ropa', Statue on the coast that represents Acapulco in Zihuatanejo, Rocks in the bay, Hotels in Playa Madero, Playa Cuachalalate and Playa La Ropa.

- Seal

- Location in Mexico Zihuatanejo (Mexico)
- Coordinates: 17°38′40″N 101°33′04″W
- Country: Mexico
- State: Guerrero
- Municipality: Zihuatanejo de Azueta
- Founded: 1520s
- Municipal status: 1953

Government
  - Municipal President (mayor): Jorge Sanchez Allec (2021-2024)

Area
  - Municipality: 1,468 km^{2} (567 sq mi)
  - Town: 10 km^{2} (3.9 sq mi)
- Elevation of seat: 20 m (66 ft)

Population (2020)
  - Municipality: 126,001
  - Density: 85.83/km^{2} (222.3/sq mi)
  - Town: 70,760
  - Town density: 7,100/km^{2} (18,000/sq mi)
- Time zone: UTC−6 (CST)
- Postal code (of seat): 40880
- Area code: 755

Zihuatanejo (Spanish pronunciation: [siwataˈnexo]), also known as Ixtapa-Zihuatanejo, is the fourth largest city in the Mexican state of Guerrero. It was known by 18th-century English mariners as Chequetan and/or Seguataneo. Politically the city belongs to the municipality of Zihuatanejo de Azueta in the western part of Guerrero, but both are commonly referred to as Zihuatanejo. It is on the Pacific Coast, about 240 km (150 miles) northwest of Acapulco. Zihuatanejo belongs to a section of the Mexican Pacific Coast known as the Costa Grande. This town has been developed as a tourist attraction along with the modern tourist resort of Ixtapa, 5 km (3.1 mi) away. However, Zihuatanejo has kept its traditional town feel. The town is located on a well-protected bay which is popular with private boat owners during the winter months. In 2023, Zihuatanejo was designated a Pueblo Mágico by the Mexican government, recognizing its cultural and historical importance. In fact, the 2020, Zihuatanejo de Azueta population was 126,001 inhabitants (48.8% men and 51.2% women), a 6.59% increase from 2010.

The name Zihuatanejo has two possible origins. One origin might be from the Purépecha language meaning "water of the yellow mountain"; another possible origin might be from Nahuatl (Cihuatlan) meaning "place of women." Cihuatlan, or "place of women", refers to the western paradise of the Nahuatl universe, the home of the "goddess women". According to tradition, these women arose in the afternoon to lead the sun at dusk to the realm of the dead, Mictlan, to give a dim light to the dead. "De Azueta" is in honor of José Azueta, who died fighting a U.S. incursion into the country in Veracruz in 1914.

Zihuatanejo spent most of its history until recently as a fishing village. The federal government's decision to develop the nearby resort in the 1970s has had major implications for both the city and municipality of Zihuatanejo. The area is now the third most-visited area in Mexico, after Cancún and Puerto Vallarta, and the most popular for sports fishermen. Zihuatanejo's population jumped from 6,887 to 37,328 by the early 1990s. Recently, a new highway called the Autopista Siglo XXI was built to connect Zihuatanejo with Morelia, cutting the travel time from Mexico City to about six hours.

Zihuatanejo was notably mentioned in the 1994 film The Shawshank Redemption, in which the protagonist Andy Dufresne escapes from prison to Zihuatanejo, joined by his friend and fellow prisoner, Ellis Boyd "Red" Redding.

== History ==
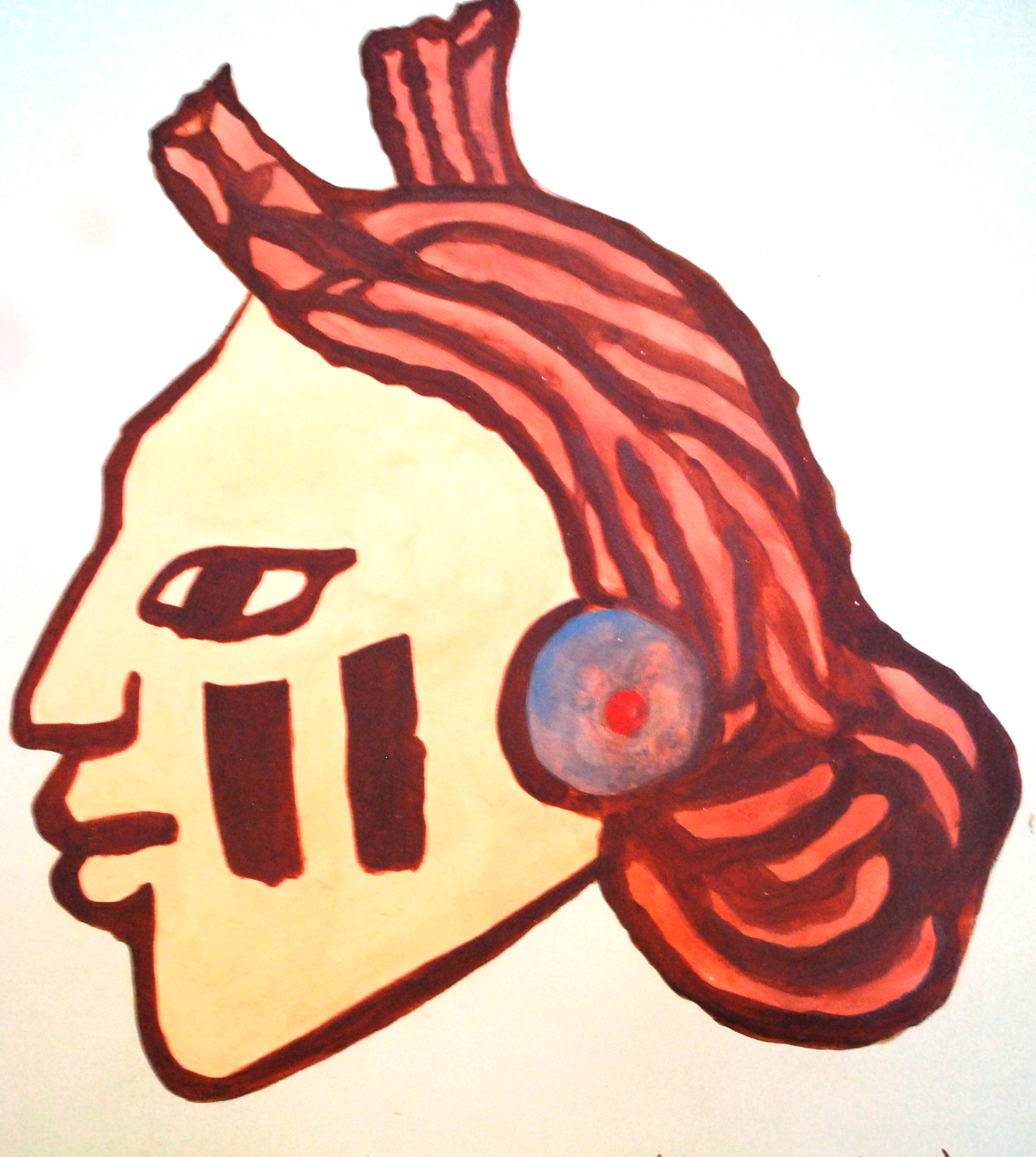
Aztec glyph for the area

=== Pre-colonial ===
The first human inhabitants of the region were nomadic tribes with a hunting and gathering culture. By the 15th century, the area was inhabited by groups called the Chumbia, the Panteca, and the Coixcas. These groups mined salt in what is now Ixtapa. The two main settlements in the area were Xihuacan, which is near the modern Zihuatanejo, and Petatlán. These two settlements along with much of the surrounding area was part of a pre-Hispanic dominion called Cuitlatepan. It extended from the Atoyac River along the coast and inland to the borders of what are now the states of Michoacán and Mexico State. Little remains of these two settlements, mostly because they were abandoned by most of the local inhabitants after being conquered by the Aztecs.

The area had always been sparsely populated before the colonial era. There are some myths and legends related to the place. There is a story that states that Zihuatanejo was a sanctuary dedicated to the goddess Cihuatéotl, who was of Olmec origin. She was considered to be the mother of the human race and the goddess of women who died in childbirth and of warriors who died in battle. In modern Zihuatanejo, there is an area called "La Madera" to the east of the port that may have been a shrine or sanctuary due to the significant number of pre-Hispanic clay figures that have been found. It is thought that this was dedicated to her. The area also appears to have been a sanctuary for the burial of important persons. In pre-Hispanic times, Purépecha kings used this area as a recreational area.

Just south of the Zihuatanejo Airport there is a large archeological site at La Soledad De Maciel and the small town of La Chole. While artifacts have been found there since the 1930s, excavations were only started between 2000 and 2010. The site was occupied from 3000 BCE to the early 600s CE when it was destroyed by a tsunami. It was occupied by three different cultures and was an important trading city for both Teotihuacan and the Olmec. At its height, it had a large population with the site possibly covering a 10 km^{2} (3.9 sq mi) area. Only a small part of the site has been excavated because most of it is owned by the local farmers who grow fruit trees, vegetables, coconuts for copra, and tobacco that they roll into cigars. The Mexican government is in the process of buying back the site, but it will be a slow process.

Cuitlatepan was conquered by the Aztecs under Ahuizotl in 1497. It was renamed Xihuacan and turned into a tributary province.

=== Colonial era ===
The Spanish arrived in the 1520s. The first Spaniard to arrive here is said to have been Gonzalo de Umbria, sent by Hernán Cortés to explore the area to see if there was any gold. The conquest caused the native peoples to mostly abandon the area, and it is not known where they went. Those left to provide tribute were known in the Mexican highlands for their cotton shawls and decorated conch shells. The oldest document with Zihuatanejo's name is called the Matricula de Tributos (Record of Tribute). Today the local indigenous language has been lost and the only trace of the native population is a small archaeological site that was explored by INAH in the 1990s.

The Spanish used the bay as a point of departure to explore the Pacific coast as well as a port for the first ships to sail to the Philippines, the Florida, the Espiritu Santo and the Santiago. These ships were ordered built by Hernán Cortés and offered to the Spanish king Carlos V. According to the chronicles written by Bernal Díaz del Castillo, the ships were constructed here using Spanish carpenters and local wood. They left Zihuatanejo Bay on 31 October 1527 with Captain Alvaro de Saavedra y Cerón. Only the Florida made it to the Asian islands, and neither the captain nor crew ever returned to Mexico.

The Ixtapa area was given to Anton Sanchez as an encomienda, with nearby Pochutla and Tamaloca as part of this arrangement. With the disappearance of the native population, fields and forests were worked by Spaniards, leaving little in the way of the colonial system which was prevalent in other parts of Mexico. The Spanish raised chocolate, cotton, vanilla, and corn here; however, the main export was tropical woods such as cedar, oak, walnut, and others. Much of this was exported to Europe. Some gold was found here, mostly in an area in the Sierra Madre del Sur mountains in an area called Real de Guadalupe and areas north of the current municipality. During the colonial period, the Spanish galleons of Manila brought coconut trees to the area, which still flourish. They were the basis of the economy of the coast for some time. Few, if any, vestiges of the haciendas of the area remain, mostly because lasting constructions such as stone mansions or aqueducts were never built, as they were in other parts of Mexico. These haciendas were generally owned by foreigners, such as the Inguarán company of France or by creoles.

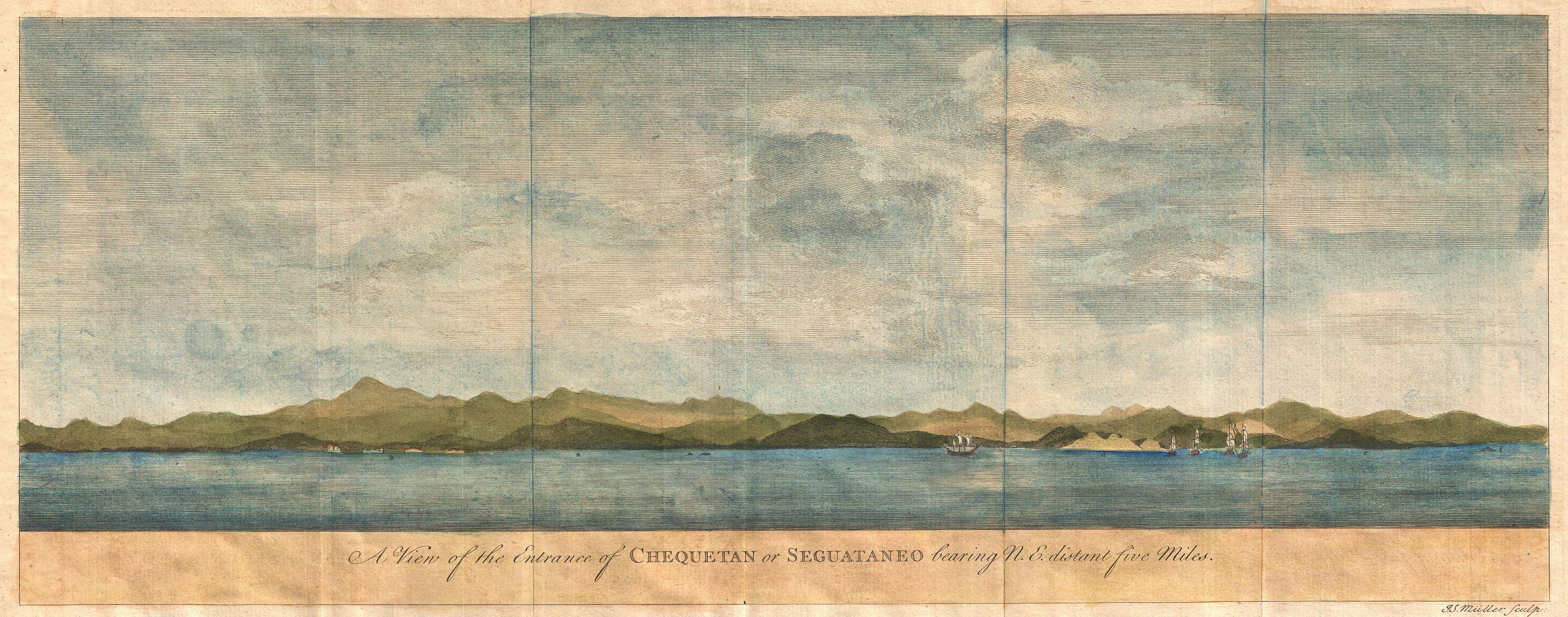
View of the town in 1748

The town now known as Zihuatanejo was a fishing village, surrounded by large haciendas. Between 1680 and 1740 there are indications that the port was used for contraband trade; that is, for trade of arriving Asian products between New Spain and Peru, an interregional trade which had been forbidden. In the second half of the 16th century, the original Spanish shipyards at Zacatula burned. Unable to reconstruct them, new ones were built at Zihuatanejo. The surrounding haciendas occasionally used the bay as a port to ship wood and minerals. The bay was visited during the colonial period by many pirates.

=== Independence and post-colonial era ===
The municipality was spared involvement in the Mexican War of Independence, except for its use by José María Morelos y Pavón as a logistic port in 1811. Morelos created the province of Tecpan, which included Zihuatanejo.

However, the municipality did suffer consequences during the Mexican Revolution. Generally, it was sympathetic to the rebel cause and many joined, such as brothers Alfredo, Leonel, Hector, and Homero Lopez. Because of its sympathies, various bands associated with the different forces fighting against the Porfirio Diaz government (and each other) came through here, as well as federal forces. These led to a certain amount of sacking, pillaging, and vandalism.

In 1823, with the first republic, Zihuatanejo was separated from Tecpan and became part of the district of Acapulco. When the state of Guerrero was created, Zihuatanejo was part of the municipality of La Unión and Petatlán.

=== 20th century ===
In 1926, a group called the "vidalistas" attacked the town which led to a secret agreement with the government to free a number of the compatriots.

In 1952, there was a strike by workers on coconut plantations from Acapulco to Zihuatanejo. Strikers blocked the highways of the town. In 1953, the town gained municipality status. In the 1970s, the area changed radically when the federal government decided to develop the Zihuatanejo-Ixtapa area into a tourist attraction. This caused the population to increase dramatically, especially in the 1980s and today the main economic base is tourism.

Tourism in Zihuatanejo was negatively impacted by some events in the 2000s. In May 2008, bull sharks gathered in large numbers along the coast for unknown reasons; two surfers were killed and a third was injured. The attacks occurred during a three-week period causing a "Jaws-like mania" and the construction of lifeguard towers and the establishment of a shark patrol for the beaches of Zihuatanejo and north. It was a rare phenomenon that subsided after the sharks dispersed.

On 20 February 2009, a group of men in a pickup truck threw explosive devices at the installations of the Secretariat of Public Security of the municipality of Zihuatanejo, resulting in five persons injured. The attack occurred at 7:45 pm near the municipal docks. At the time of the attack, the 56th Infantry Battalion had been stationed in Zihuatanejo, mostly to interdict the traffic in arms, drugs and stolen vehicles. The grenade attack on the security headquarters was followed by a highway ambush that killed four policemen. Kidnapping of Mexican citizens has been a problem here as well. In one instance four kidnapping victims were rescued by elements of the Mexican military and police, killing one suspect in the process.

== Town and its bay ==
=== Town center ===
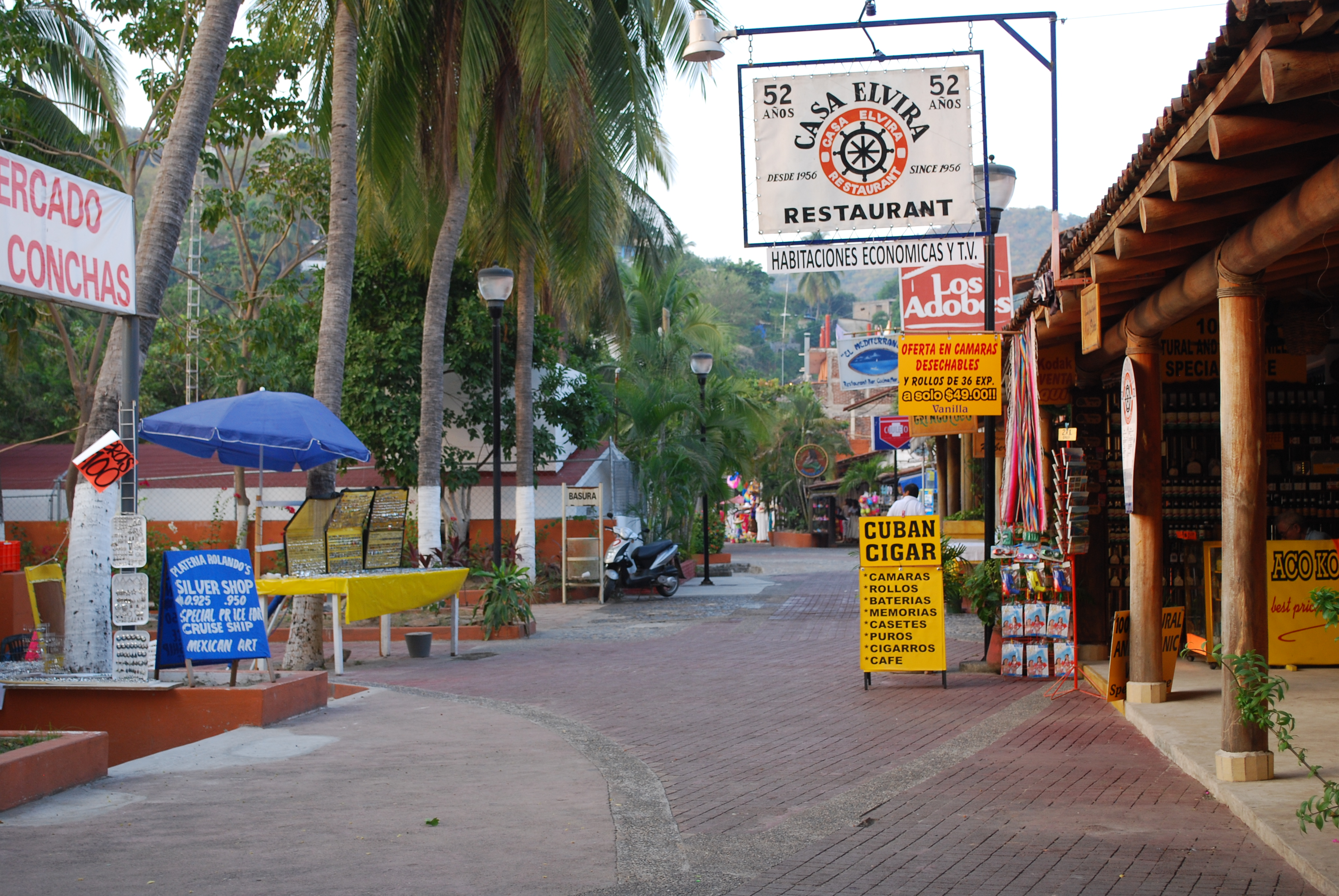
Part of Paseo del Pescador or boardwalk

The fishing town and resort of Zihuatanejo spreads out around the Bay of Zihuatanejo and inland toward the Sierra Madre del Sur mountains. The town is the seat of government for the municipality and the principal community in the region. Since the 1970s, it has been developed in conjunction with nearby Ixtapa, but conserving its traditional Mexican feel. The downtown is called "El Centro" and is located on the north end of the bay. The centro still has its narrow streets paved with stones or bricks. The town also has a long-standing community of Swiss and Italian immigrants.

The heart of Zihuatanejo is the waterfront walkway Paseo del Pescador (Fisherman's Path), also called the malecón. This tree-lined pedestrian walkway goes along the municipal beach between the archeological museum and the fishing pier. It is lined with restaurants offering seafood and many other dishes, as well as a variety of stores selling rugs, arts and crafts and souvenirs, and a small shell market. In the evening, this area fills with people socializing.

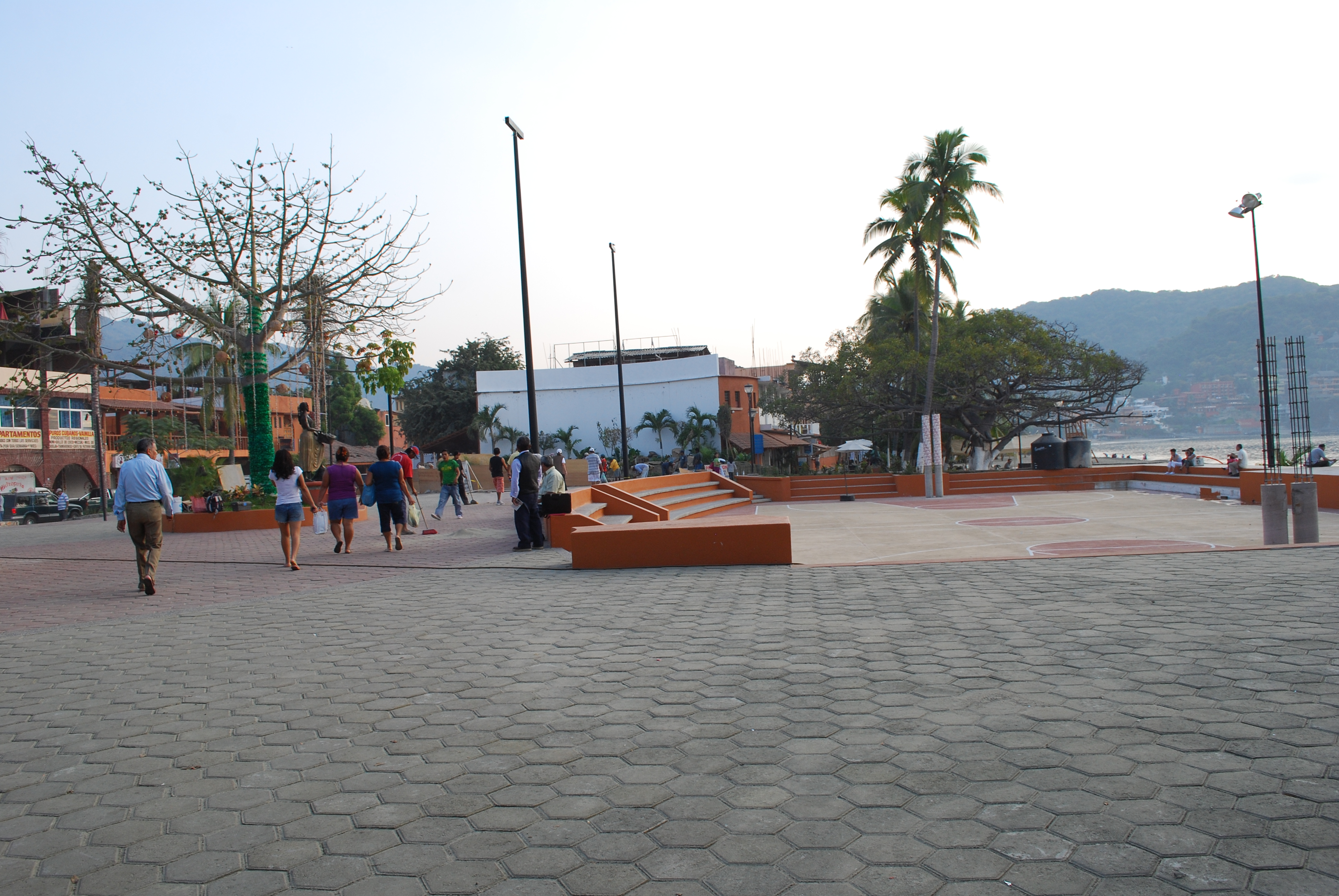
Plaza with an unfinished basketball court with no baskets

Instead of a traditional plaza, the center is a basketball court which is in front of the beach and serves as a point of reference. It is surrounded by benches and shade trees. Next to this are the gazebo and the Casa de la Cultura. These venues host music, concerts, cultural presentations, art shows. The main thoroughfare for cars is Juan Alvarez, a block behind the malecón. Sections of several of the main streets are designated pedestrian zones. The main church of the town, the Parish of Nuestra Señora de Guadalupe, is located nearby.

Zihuatanejo's oldest building was part of the Ingrana family hacienda, which was a coconut plantation. Today, the building houses "Restaurant Coconuts", but was the storage facility for the plantation when it was built about 150 years ago. The plantation remained in the family until the Mexican Revolution, when this particular building was confiscated and turned into a field hospital and the rest of the plantation was divided into smaller units. The current restaurant opened in 1979 after restoring this building. Much of the timber in the bar area is original. The gallery of Restaurant Coconuts has a collection of Works done by Guerrero native Nicolás de Jesús.

The Mercado de Artesanías (Crafts Market) has 250 shops, which sell a wide variety of crafts. These include those local work done with seashells, coral and snail shells. The market also has silver from Taxco and lacquered objects from Olinalá, Guerrero, and ceramics and bark paper paintings from the central valleys region of Oaxaca. The town center has its own beach, called the "municipal beach", but it is not recommended for swimming. Due to its proximity to the port, there is constant maritime traffic in this part of the bay.

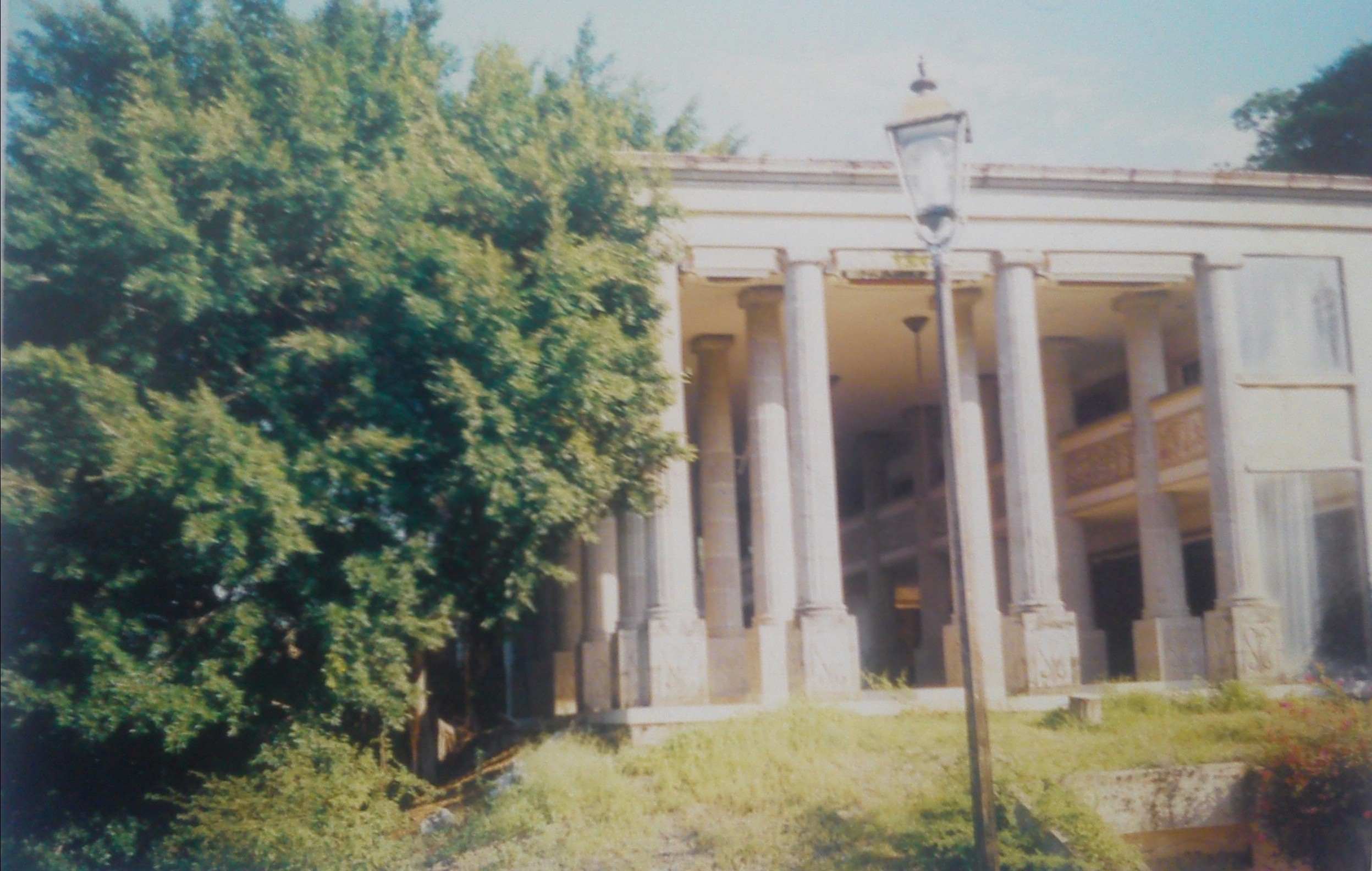
"The Parthenon", a luxury residence built and once owned by Arturo Durazo Moreno "El Negro", nowadays managed by the Fideicomiso Bahía de Zihuatanejo (Fibazi), Bay of Zihuatanejo Trust

The town hosts an annual festival called the Annual Zihua Sail Fest, which raises funds for the education of disadvantaged children in Zihuatanejo. The five-day event takes place in February with more than 100 boats, some from as far away as Alaska coming into the bay. Events include cocktail parties, concerts, auctions and sailboat races, chili cook offs and street fairs. In 2009, the event raised $640,000 pesos, along with a matching grant and a donation of US$20,000 by the Rotary International.

Another festival is the Zihuatanejo International Guitar Festival which is held in March; it is a week-long event held at multiple locations every night, with a children's show as well as a free public show at the main plaza. The Zihua Guitar Fest brings guitarists from all over the world such as Canadian artist Adrian Raso, Los Angeles’ artist Omar Torrez, South Africa's Margaret's Daughter, Nashville's Eric McFadden and Texas-based Los Pistoleros to name a few. This festival prides itself in drawing tourism to the area which helps support the many small family-owned businesses. This festival began in 2004 and has been a big hit for locals as well as tourists.

=== Port ===
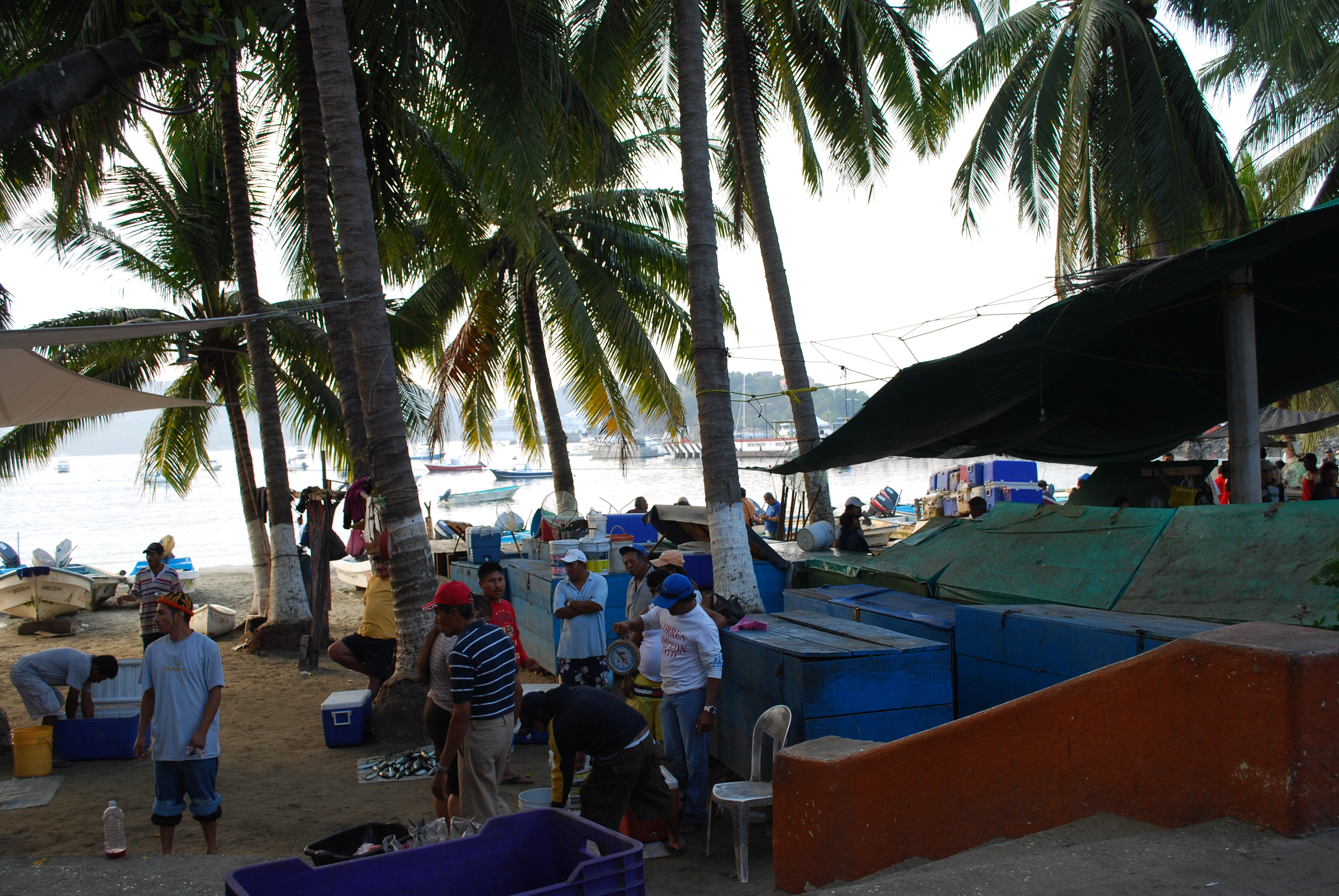
Fish market area

The port is mainly used by fishermen who arrive to the docks every morning with their catch, "pangas" and other boats that ferry passengers to places like Las Gatas beach, and fishing charters. There is also a cruise ship greet and rest area for passenger who visit the town. Sport fishing is a major draw to this part of Zihuatanejo. In February 2001, Sport Fishing Magazine rated the Zihuatanejo area second worldwide for sailfishing, based on the number of strikes per day and other factors. Yearly, on the first weekend of May, Zihuatanejo hosts the International Sailfish Tournament. The event brings hundreds of fishermen and boats into town in the hopes of winning one of the many prizes offered for largest sailfish, marlin and dorado.

Fish that can be caught here include roosterfish, jacks, snook, grouper and small tuna close to shore between Wamaluli Point and Morro de Pampanoa, but they are not the main attraction here. Most of the sport fishing occurs offshore, about five miles out. Billfish of one of the major attractions. Sport fishing operations exist here using boats such as super pangas and luxury cruisers. Sailfish and marlin can be had, caught, and released. The seas can be very choppy near the shore but calm farther out. Most visitors come for these two fish, which are available year-round. Blue and black marlin are available much of the year, with February and March being the best months. Several huge fish have been caught here such as the 1,100-pound (500 kg) black marlin caught just a 1/4-mile (0.4 km) offshore. Other fish include skipjack tuna and yellowfin tuna.

==== Cruises ====
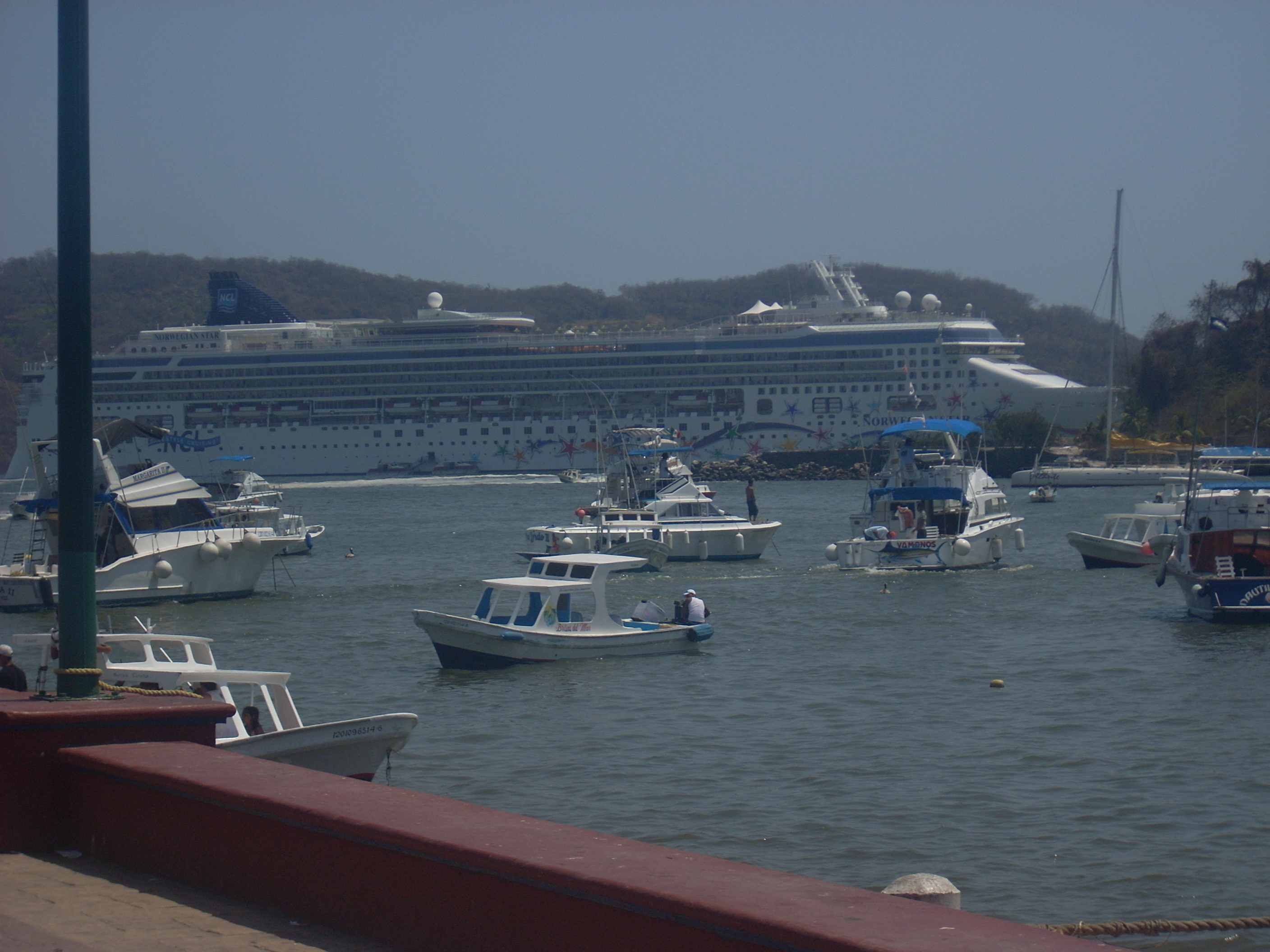
Norwegian Star docked in Zihuatanejo, 2008.

Cruises often stop at Zihuatanejo, the city having become a major cruise stop and a major attraction for its beaches. The city is also famous for its catamaran tours, most popular and known is Picante Cruises, operating in both Zihuatanejo and Ixtapa bay where snorkeling, spinnaker flying, and sunset cruises are offered.

=== Archeological Museum of the Costa Grande ===
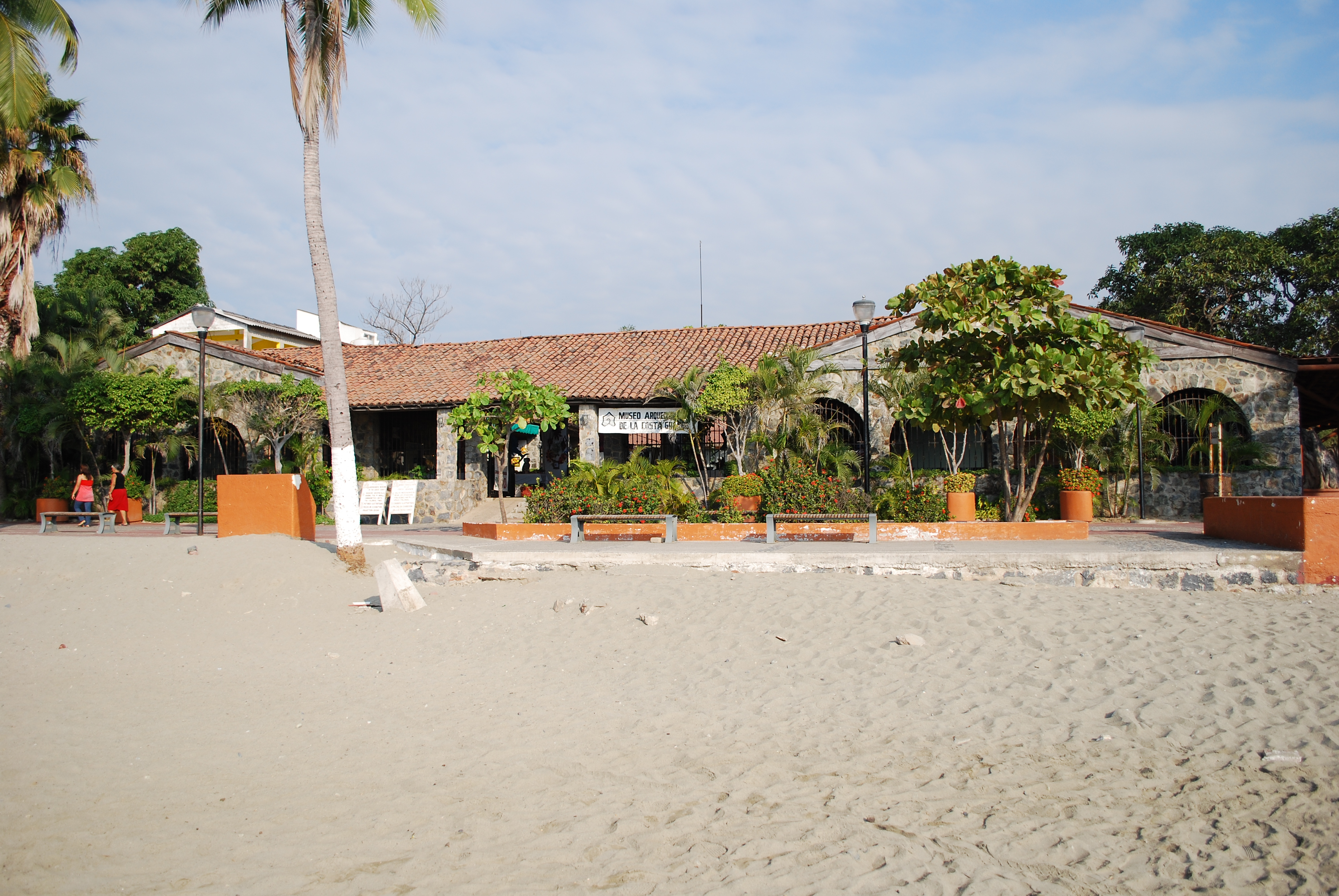
Archeological museum

The Museo Arqueológico de la Costa Grande (Archeological Museum of the Costa Grande) is located at the southern end of the municipal beach and the Paseo de los Pescadores. It has six rooms that document the history, archeology, and culture of this part of the Guerrero coast. Many of the artifacts are from as far away as the Olmec and Toltec civilizations, as both explored this area. Room one of the museum displays artifacts from settlements established on the coasts of Jalisco, Nayarit, Colima and Guerrero. Room two houses ceramics and carvings from the area of Cerro de la Madera, in Zihuatanejo, among others. Room three features the Tierras Prietas site, the cultivation of food plants and use of natural resources such as the bajareque technique of walls made of interwoven branches and clay. Room 4 covers aspects of village life and cultural exchange from 200 to 750 A.C.; the introduction of ball games and new pottery techniques. Room five contains pieces from the Aztec period from 1487 to the 1520s, when the province of Cihuatlan was established, and tribute was paid to the Aztecs by the local population in shells, chocolate, basketry and textiles. Room six covers the colonial period and search for a maritime route to the west during the 16th and 17th centuries. During this time the ports of Zihuatanejo and Acapulco were important points of reference for Spanish and other navigators.

=== Bay and its beaches ===
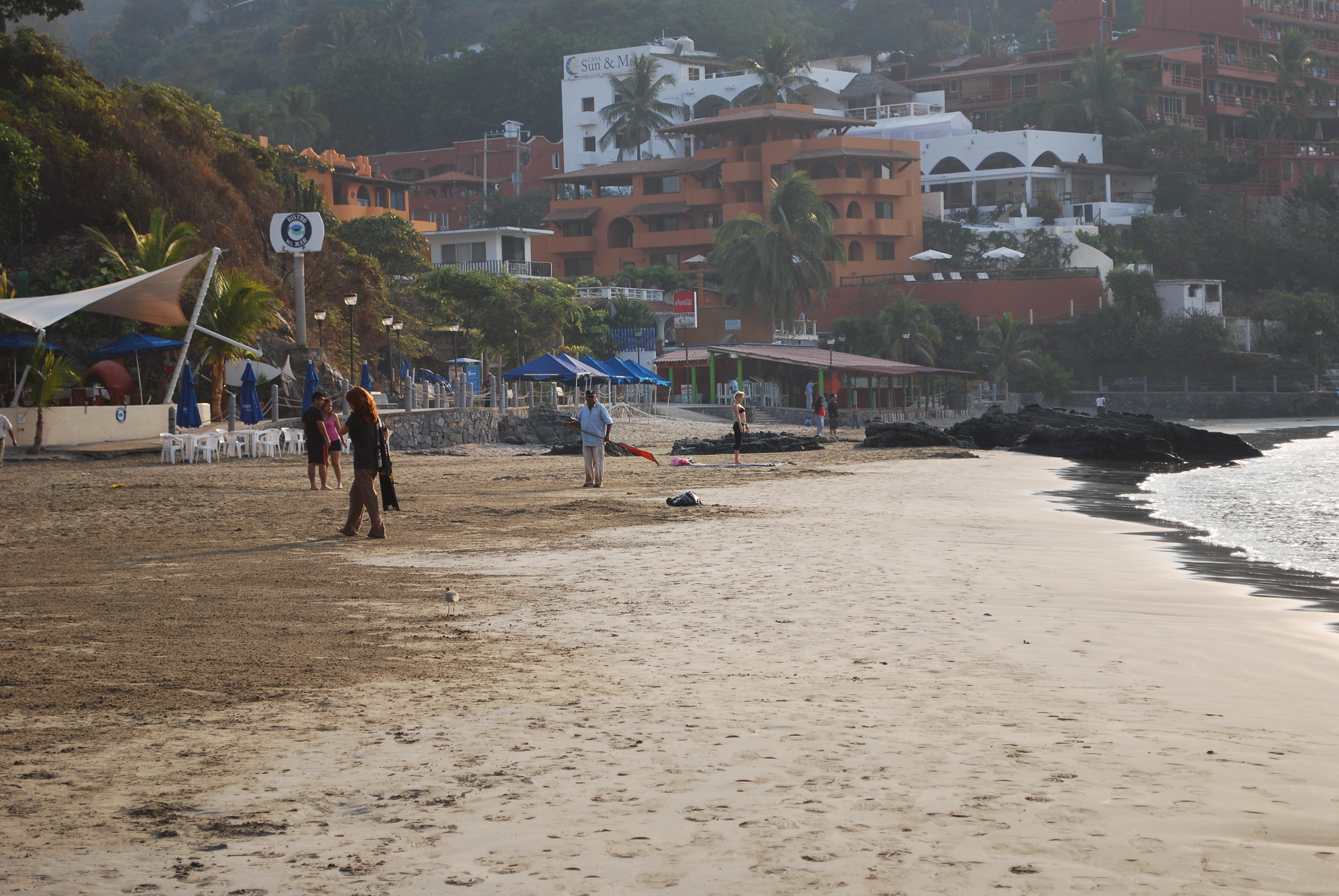
View of Playa Madera

Zihuatanejo's main attraction is its bay, which is well-protected from open ocean. It is a favorite place to moor boats from small private ones to large yachts during the winter months. The bay's width varies from between 950 and 1,750 meters (1,040 and 1,910 yards) in width and averages 18 meters (59 feet) deep. It is mostly surrounded by beaches, most of which have gentle waves. On land the bay is surrounded by the foothills of the Sierra Madre mountains. Development of this area has caused some environmental problems. The town's five water treatment plants can no longer keep up with demand, with some untreated wastewater and sediment flowing into the bay. There has also been some wholesale destruction of the hills right on the bay to create development space, and there is concern about damage to the local coral reef. Some development projects, such as a dock for cruise ships and Punta del Mar (a complex of hotels, villas, pools and a marina) have been delayed due to the need for environmental impact studies.

The ring of beaches of Zihuatanejo Bay begins with the Municipal Beach which is in front of the town center and next to the port. From there, there is a cement and sand walkway that leads to Playa Madera (Wood Beach). It is a 2-kilometer (1.2 mi) stretch of light-colored sand between the municipal beach and Playa La Ropa. The waves here are gentle with the occasional wave. This beach contains a number of bay-view restaurants, bungalows, condominiums and hotels, as well as a walkway that extends the length of the beach. Part of the beach is covered in pebbles.

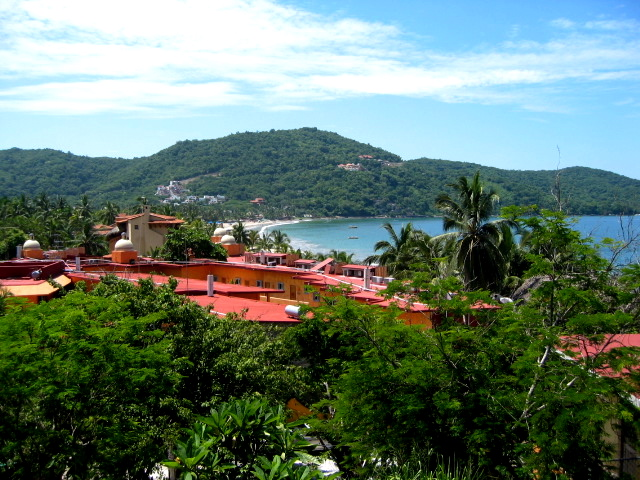
Partial view over Playa la Ropa

Moving away from the town center along the bay, the next beach is called Playa La Ropa (Clothes Beach). The name Playa La Ropa (Clothes Beach) refers to the sinking of a merchant ship near the bay during colonial times. Its cargo of fine silks, belts, cloaks and fabrics from Bombay washed up in this beach. This beach is about 1.2 km (0.75 mi) long and considered the best for swimming as there is little wave action. During the winter months, many sailboats moor here. Just behind the beach, the land rises suddenly into cliffs, which are dotted with hotels, large residences and guest houses.

A number of these hotels sponsor the local turtle conservation campaign, setting up fenced-off areas in which turtle eggs found along the beach are gathered and protected during incubation from August through December. After hatching, the baby turtles are kept in tubs and released periodically into the ocean at sunset. These hotels invite guests to help with the release.

The beach contains a very small fenced estuary which is home to several crocodiles. They have lived here for years and are well-fed by the local restaurants, although they are still wild creatures.

In a parking lot at the end of La Ropa Beach, one of the parking spaces has become a place of reverence for the Virgin of Guadalupe. According to local reports, an image of the virgin appeared on the bole of a plum tree on 27 November 2006. This is considered by many to be a miracle, especially as it occurred shortly before the Virgin's feast day of 12 December. The tree has a base constructed around it with stairs allowing visitors to see the image more easily. There are places to deposit candles and offerings and flowers have been planted around the tree. On 12 December, a mass and candlelit vigil is held here.

Playa Las Gatas (Cats Beach) is on the opposite side of the bay from town, is accessible only by boat as there are no paved roads that lead to here and a small, poorly defined, rocky footpath leading from Playa La Ropa. Las Gatas was originally named for a small cat shark that used to inhabit these waters. It is located at the entrance to the bay at a place called Punta del Rey (King's Point). This leaves the area open to ocean breezes. Wave action is stronger, but not as strong as those beaches that face the open ocean as there is a coral reef and a man-made stone barrier in front of it. According to legend, Purépecha chief Calzontzin had a stone barrier built here to keep the waves down and the sea creatures out, creating a kind of swimming pool. Las Gatas is the most popular snorkeling beach in Zihuatanejo. Gear can be rented at Carlo Scuba, along with PADI instruction and certification. Colorful tropical fish can be seen along the man-made breakwater, as well as the abundant coral and sea urchins. At the far end of the beach surfing is possible, and a path leads to the lighthouse on the point of the bay.

== Municipality ==
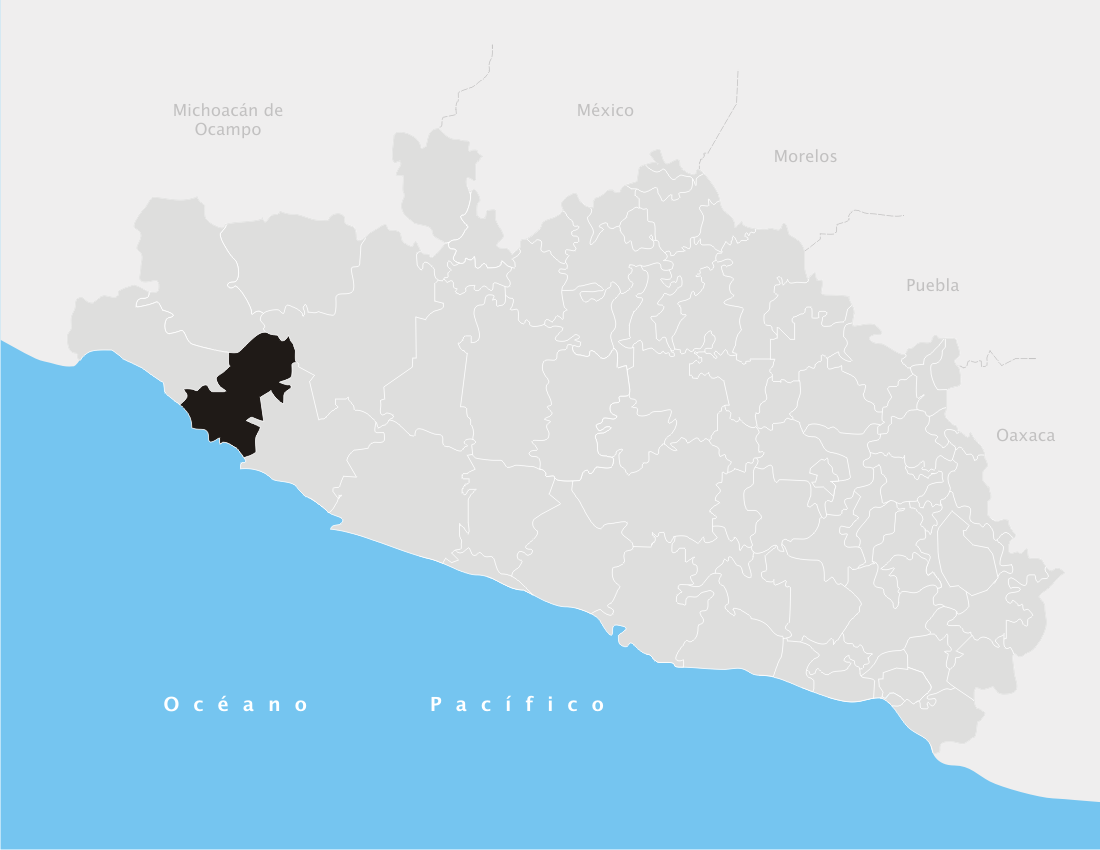
Location of the municipality in Guerrero state

The town of Zihuatanejo is the seat of the municipality of Zihuatanejo de Azueta and as such is the governmental authority for approximately 416 communities, with a total population of 104,609 as of 2005, and an area of 1,921.5 km^{2} (741.9 sq mi). There are small indigenous communities in the municipality which speak Nahuatl and Tlapaneco. Population increase for the period of 1995-2000 was 1.85 percent, with a population density of just under fifty people per square km. The greatest population increase was seen in the 1980s when the municipality jumped from 25,751 to 63,366 residents. The municipality borders the municipalities of Coyuca de Catalán, Coahuayutla de José María Izazaga, Petatlán and La Unión de Isidoro Montes de Oca, as well as the Pacific Ocean. Altitude varies from between 0 and 1,000 meters (0 and 3,281 feet) above sea level. Much of the municipality (70%) is rugged terrain with the rest being semi-flat or flat. Major peaks here are the Sierra de la Cuchara and the Cumbre de la Peatada. Major rivers here include the Verde and the Ixtapa. There are also a number of small streams such as the Real, Pantla, Zapote, and Lagunillas.

The climate is warm and mostly moist, with an average temperature of 26 °C (78.8 °F). The rainy season is from June to September. Land wildlife mostly consists of small mammals, bats, and lizards. The bay contains fish such as red snapper, bass, other fish and sea turtles. Because of the climate's temperature and humidity, the beaches of Zihuatanejo are apt for the incubation of various sea turtles eggs such as the leatherback, hawksbill and olive ridley. The annual program for the collection and protection of turtle eggs starts at the beginning of June and lasts until the end of December. 31 December is celebrated with a massive baby turtle release along the coasts north and south of Zihuatanejo bay. The program consists of twenty one incubation corrals, along thirty-two kilometers (20 mi) of beaches. These corrals protect the thousands of turtle eggs collected during this time period by government staff and trained volunteers. After birth, they are kept here until they grow large enough to avoid most natural predators and increase their chances of survival.

The most important economic activity for the municipality is tourism, with the major attractions being the beaches. Most international visitors come between November and December and most Mexican tourists come in December, April, July and August. Seventy-one percent of the municipality's population is engaged in the commercial and tourism sector of the economy. Outside of Zihuatanejo Bay, some of most important beaches include Quieta Beach, Majahua Beach and Playa Larga. Prior to the 1970s, economic activity was based on fishing and agriculture. At that time, the federal government decided to make a planned resort at Ixtapa, just north of the municipal seat of Zihuatanejo, constructed on what was once a coconut plantation and mangrove estuary. It is a complete tourist center with a hotel strip three kilometers (1.9 mi) long, white sands, shopping centers, restaurants, nightclubs, golf courses, residences.

To the south of Zihuatanejo Bay, there are a number of beaches and a lagoon on the way to the regional airport. Playa Larga (Long Beach), Playa Blanca (White Beach) and Las Pozas (The Wells) are parts of the same long stretch of white sand that runs from north west of the airport, past the airport and down to Barra de Potosí. Total length of these beaches in about fifteen kilometers (9.3 mi). Swimming is strongly discouraged off any of these beaches as they face open ocean and have heavy undertows riptides and current. Behind the beaches are coconut groves, small huts and mango trees. Cacti grow on the hillsides, sometimes down to the beach itself. Activities that are recommended for this area include whale watching from December to February and dolphin watching all year round, both of which can be done from the beach. There is horseback riding on the beaches and into the adjoining hills. The beach is dotted with open-air restaurants with roofs thatched with palm fronds, tree branches and flower. Volleyball net and soccer posts are set up in front of many of the restaurants as well.

On the southern end of these beaches is the village of Barra de Potosí. There is a lagoon here, called Laguna de Potosí and islets called Morros de Potosí. The lagoon area has a large mangrove estuary filled with bird wildlife. Birdwatching, kayaking and fishing are popular here. The lagoon opens to the ocean and the beaches contain many "enramadas", palm-thatched outdoor restaurants. Many of these enramadas are decorated with colorful paper or plastic cutouts, especially during the Christmas season. The Morros de Potosí are offshore and is a popular place for snorkeling, with red-billed tropicbirds, brown boobies and brown pelicans nesting on the rocks. In the winter season the bay hosts humpback whales, mother/calf pairs and some males are seen leaping from the water. There is a whale study project, Whales of Mexico, that takes place in the winter as well.

Inland there are a couple of attractions. La Vainilla is an ecological park located 162 km (101 mi) from the town of Zihuatanejo on the hilly terrain of the foothills of the Sierra Madre del Sur mountains. It covers approximately 344 hectares (850 acres), and contains 428 species of plants. These are distributed in three plant communities; bosque tropical subcaducifolio (semi-evergreen seasonal forest), bosque tropical caducifolio (deciduous seasonal forest) and bosque en galleria (gallery forest), with the first type most prevalent. There is also one small archeological site named Tierras Prietas.

Aside from tourism, fishing continues to be a way of life for a large number of families, bringing in seafood such as shark, clams, oysters, red snapper, bass and mugil. The increasing popularity of the area as a sportfishing destination has given new impetus to its livelihood, and traditional fishing is being supplemented with fish farms. The fish caught and produced mainly goes to local, regional and state markets. As in the past, much of the forest area here is still exploited for timber. Timber area covers 13,835 hectares (34,190 acres) of the municipality and woods obtained include pine, cedar, mahogany and oak. There is also some livestock-raising, mostly in the south of the municipality, and coffee-growing in the north. Crops are planted on only seven percent of the territory, but include corn, beans, sorghum and sesame seed.

== Food ==
The local specialty is huachinango or whole red snapper, usually prepared Veracruzana (with savory tomato sauce) or al mojo de ajo (with garlic sauce).

== Geography ==
=== Climate ===
The Köppen Climate Classification sub-type for this climate is "Aw" (Tropical Savanna Climate).

Climate data for Ixtapa-Zihuatanejo (1951–2010)
Month	Jan	Feb	Mar	Apr	May	Jun	Jul	Aug	Sep	Oct	Nov	Dec	Year
Record high °C (°F)	38.0 (100.4)	38.0 (100.4)	37.0 (98.6)	38.0 (100.4)	41.0 (105.8)	39.0 (102.2)	42.0 (107.6)	41.0 (105.8)	39.5 (103.1)	39.0 (102.2)	38.0 (100.4)	38.0 (100.4)	42.0 (107.6)
Mean daily maximum °C (°F)	31.5 (88.7)	31.6 (88.9)	31.5 (88.7)	32.3 (90.1)	32.9 (91.2)	32.6 (90.7)	32.6 (90.7)	32.5 (90.5)	31.9 (89.4)	32.4 (90.3)	32.1 (89.8)	31.8 (89.2)	32.1 (89.8)
Daily mean °C (°F)	25.5 (77.9)	25.2 (77.4)	25.6 (78.1)	26.5 (79.7)	27.4 (81.3)	28.0 (82.4)	27.8 (82.0)	27.9 (82.2)	27.5 (81.5)	27.6 (81.7)	27.0 (80.6)	26.1 (79.0)	26.8 (80.2)
Mean daily minimum °C (°F)	19.4 (66.9)	18.8 (65.8)	19.7 (67.5)	20.8 (69.4)	22.0 (71.6)	23.4 (74.1)	23.0 (73.4)	23.2 (73.8)	23.0 (73.4)	22.8 (73.0)	21.8 (71.2)	20.4 (68.7)	21.5 (70.7)
Record low °C (°F)	10.0 (50.0)	12.0 (53.6)	14.0 (57.2)	14.5 (58.1)	14.5 (58.1)	19.0 (66.2)	16.5 (61.7)	17.5 (63.5)	17.5 (63.5)	17.0 (62.6)	14.0 (57.2)	12.0 (53.6)	10.0 (50.0)
Average rainfall mm (inches)	22.8 (0.90)	7.5 (0.30)	4.2 (0.17)	0.6 (0.02)	16.8 (0.66)	185.5 (7.30)	157.9 (6.22)	196.0 (7.72)	327.0 (12.87)	111.0 (4.37)	16.9 (0.67)	7.3 (0.29)	1,053.5 (41.48)
Average rainy days (≥ 0.1 mm)	1.0	0.3	0.1	0.1	1.4	9.9	10.6	11.6	14.4	6.2	1.4	0.6	57.6
Source: Servicio Meteorologico Nacional

Average sea temperature
Jan	Feb	Mar	Apr	May	Jun	Jul	Aug	Sep	Oct	Nov	Dec
77 °F 25 °C	77 °F 25 °C	77 °F 25 °C	79 °F 26 °C	81 °F 27 °C	82 °F 28 °C	82 °F 28 °C	84 °F 29 °C	82 °F 28 °C	82 °F 28 °C	81 °F 27 °C	79 °F 26 °C

== Transportation ==
Zihuatanejo can be reached by air, bus and highway and has its own airport, Ixtapa-Zihuatanejo International. Flights are available from Mexico City, several provincial cities, and various places in the United States and Canada.

Airlines: Aeromexico, Interjet, Air Canada (seasonal), Alaska Airlines, American Airlines (seasonal), Delta Air Lines (seasonal), Sun Country Airlines (seasonal), United Airlines, WestJet.

Charter Lines: Apple Vacations, Champion Air, Funjet Vacations, MLT Vacations, Ryan International, Sunwing Vacations, and others.

Bus Lines: Autovias, Costa Line, Estrella de Oro, Estrella Blanca, La Linea Plus, Parhikuni, Primera Plus and Tap.

== Sister cities ==
- Collingwood, Ontario, Canada
- Tauranga, New Zealand
- Palm Desert, California, United States
- Los Gatos, California, United States
- Bensenville, Illinois, United States
- McAllen, Texas, United States

== See also ==
- Arturo Durazo Moreno
- Barra de Potosí in Petatlan
- Isla Ixtapa
- Ixtapa
- Ixtapa-Zihuatanejo International Airport
