= Máximo Pacheco =

Máximo Pacheco may refer to:

- Máximo Pacheco Gómez (1924–2012), Chilean lawyer and politician, father of the latter
- Máximo Pacheco Matte (born 1953), Chilean economist and politician
- Máximo Pacheco Miranda (1905–1992), Mexican muralist
- Máximo Pacheco Balanza (born 1961), winner of Bolivia's National Novel Award in 2010
