= Ixtapa =

City in Guerrero, Mexico

- City
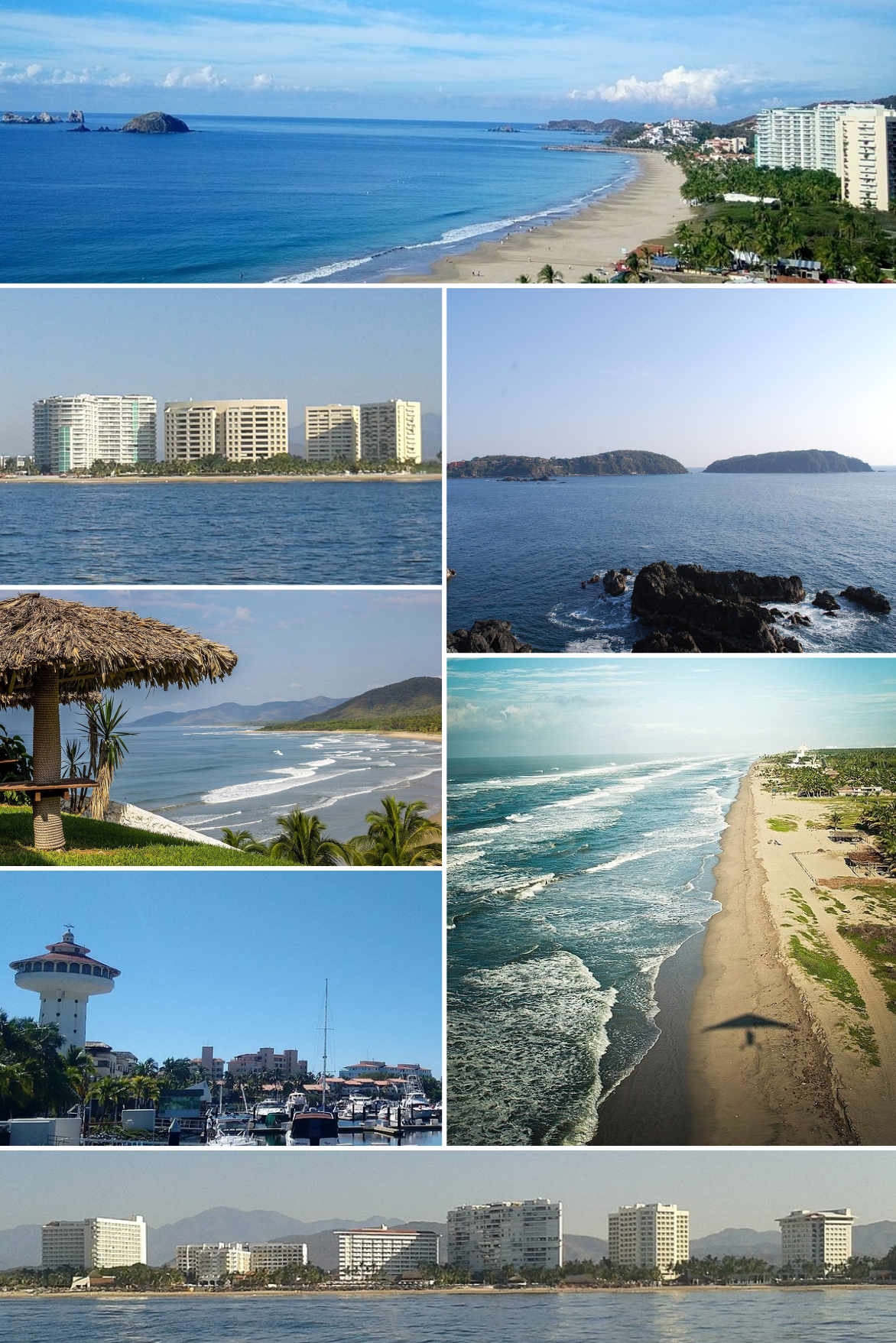

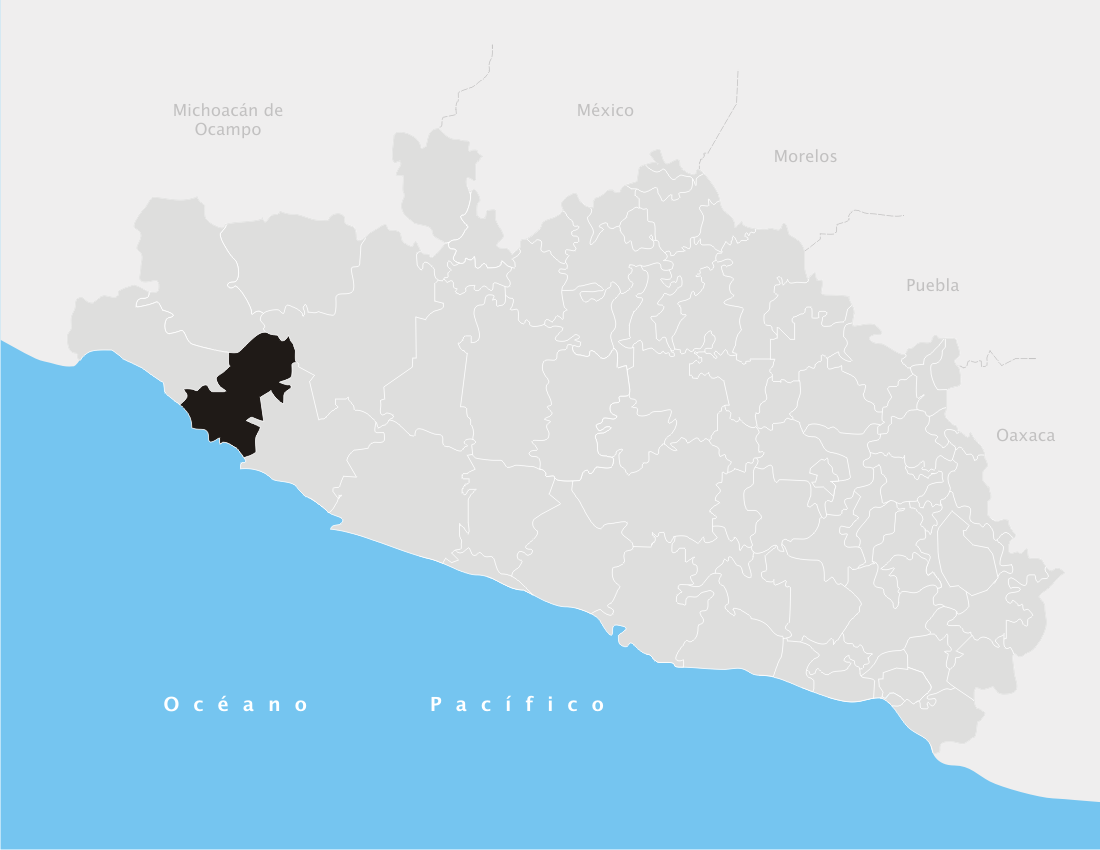
- Municipality of Zihuatanejo de Azueta in Guerrero

- Location in Mexico
- Coordinates: 17°38′12″N 101°33′05″W
- Country: Mexico
- State: Guerrero
- Municipality: Zihuatanejo de Azueta
- Opened: 1974

Population (2020)
  - Total: 13,806
- Website: ixtapa-zihuatanejo.gob.mx

Ixtapa (Spanish pronunciation: [iksˈta.pa], Nahuatl pronunciation) is a resort city in Mexico, adjacent to the Pacific Ocean in the municipality of Zihuatanejo de Azueta in the state of Guerrero. It is located 5 km (3 mi) northwest of the municipal seat, Zihuatanejo, and 245 km (150 mi) northwest of Acapulco.

In the 2020 INEGI census, the population of Ixtapa was 13,806.

== Creation of Ixtapa ==
Ixtapa is a government-planned Mexican tourist resort created in the early 1970s, and constructed on what was once a coconut plantation and mangrove estuary.

In 1968, the Bank of Mexico created a special fund for the creation of new tourist destinations on the country's coastlines. The first two such destinations were Cancún, in the state of Quintana Roo, and Ixtapa, next to the town of Zihuatanejo. The development of Ixtapa was supported by a loan from the World Bank.

The master plan for Ixtapa was developed by architect siblings Agustín Landa Verdugo and Enrique Landa Verdugo (d. 2004), who also participated in the choice of the site. Their project defined the tourist destination's street layout and zoning. The project is organized in super-blocks with irregular shapes, with high-speed streets separating these blocks, and culs-de-sac within them.

Other architects were selected to build in this city, and some are still residents of this town. Architects Miguel Ángel Rojas and Concepción Rivera live and work in this town.

The famous Mexican telenovela Marimar was filmed here in 1994.

== Transportation ==
Ixtapa can be reached by air, bus and highway and has its own airport, Ixtapa-Zihuatanejo International. Flights are available from Mexico City, several provincial cities, and various places in the United States and Canada.

Airlines: Aeroméxico, Air Canada, Alaska Airlines, American Airlines, Delta Air Lines, Frontier Airlines, Interjet, Sunwing Airlines, TAR Aerolineas, United Airlines, US Airways and WestJet.

Charter Lines: Apple Vacations, Canjet, Champion Air, Funjet Vacations, Delta Vacations, Ryan International, Global Air, Transat Holidays, Sunwing Vacations, Sun Country, Magnicharters, and others.

Bus Lines: Autovias, Costa Line, Estrella de Oro, Estrella Blanca, La Linea Plus, Parhikuni, Primera Plus, Turistar/Futura, Omnibus de Mexico and others.

== Popular culture ==
Parts of the 1987 film Hot Pursuit with John Cusack, Wendy Gazelle, Robert Loggia, Jerry Stiller, and Ben Stiller (in his first starring role) were filmed in and around the area.

== Gallery ==
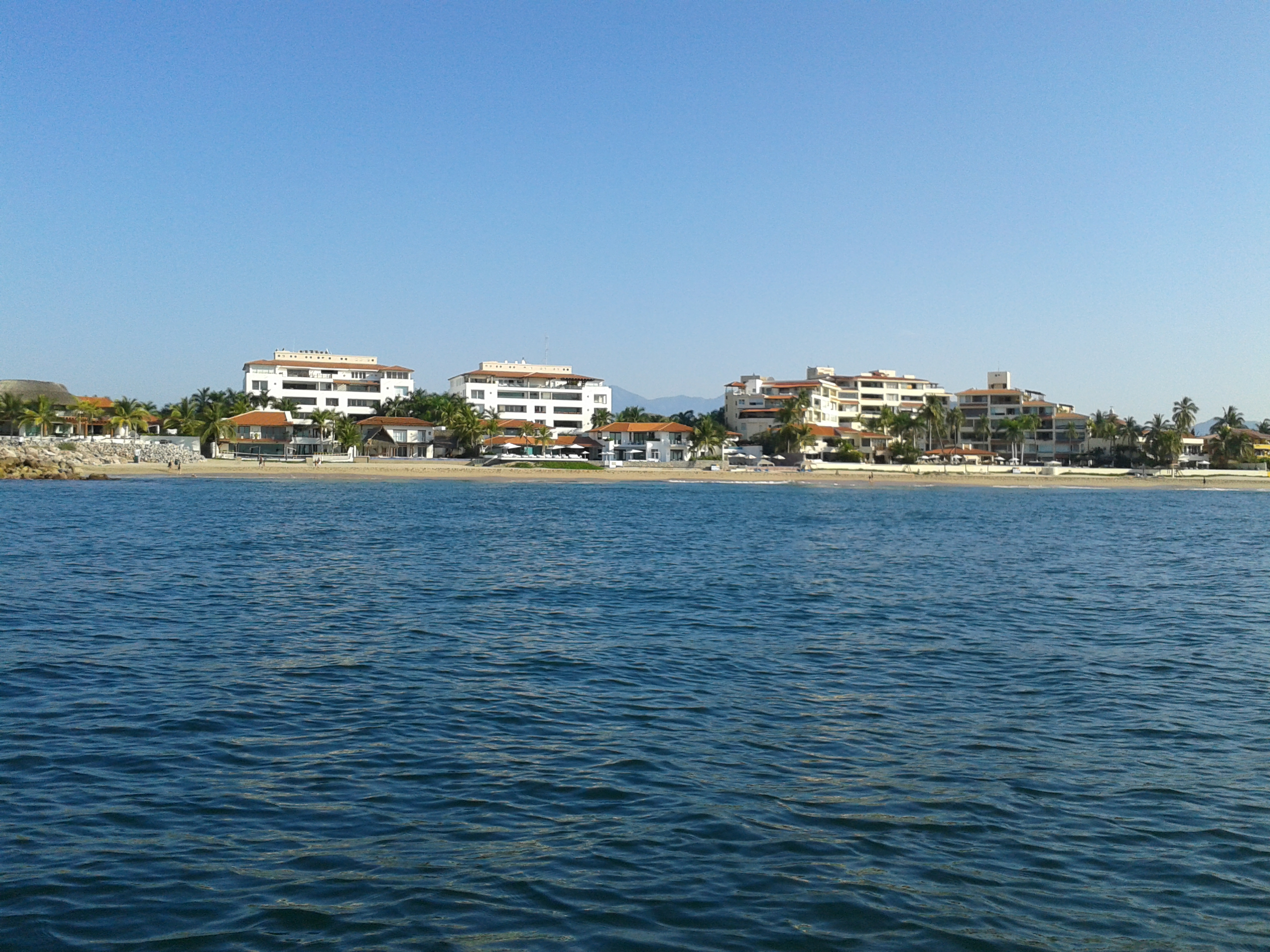
Ixtapa bay

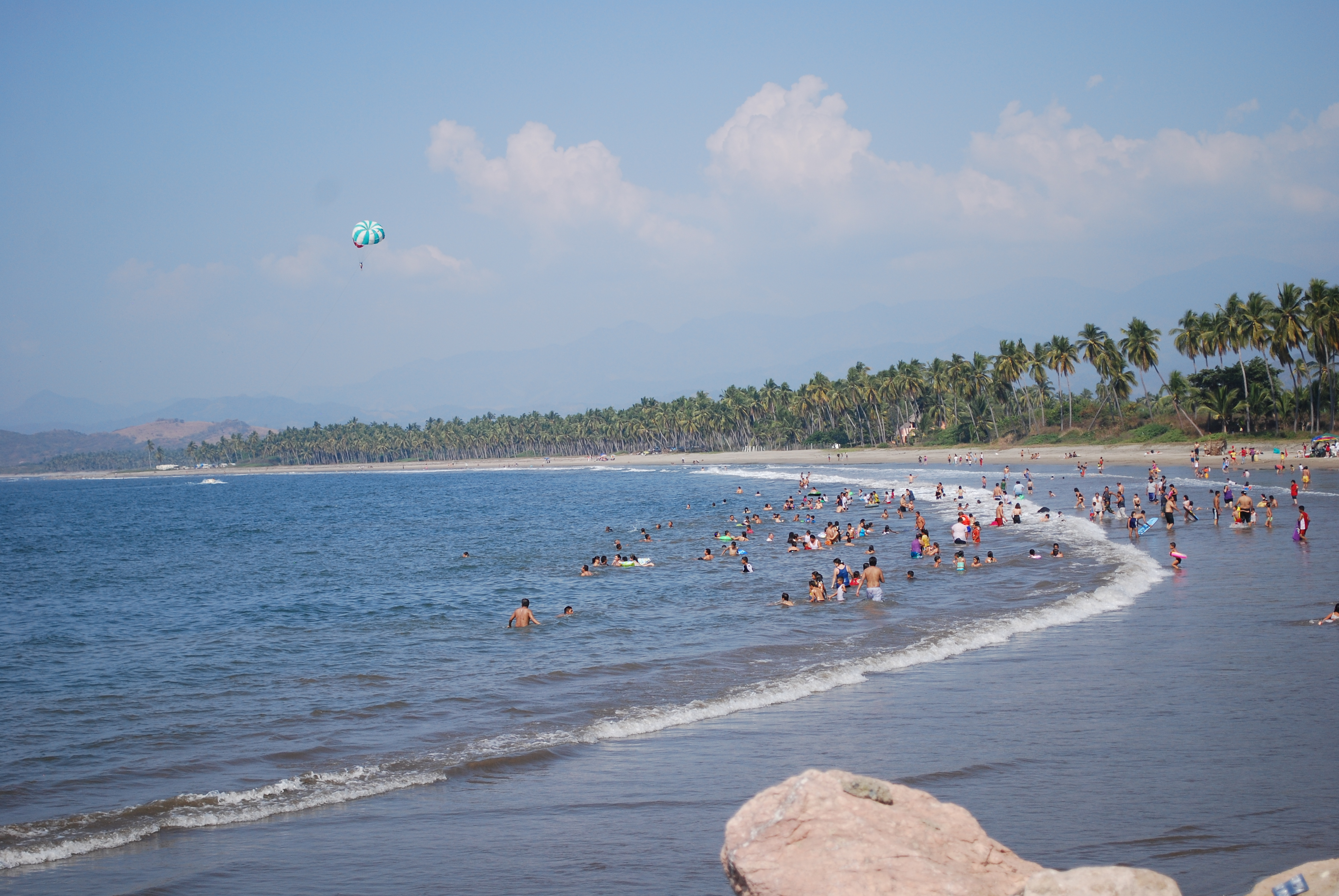
Linda beach
(Playa Linda)

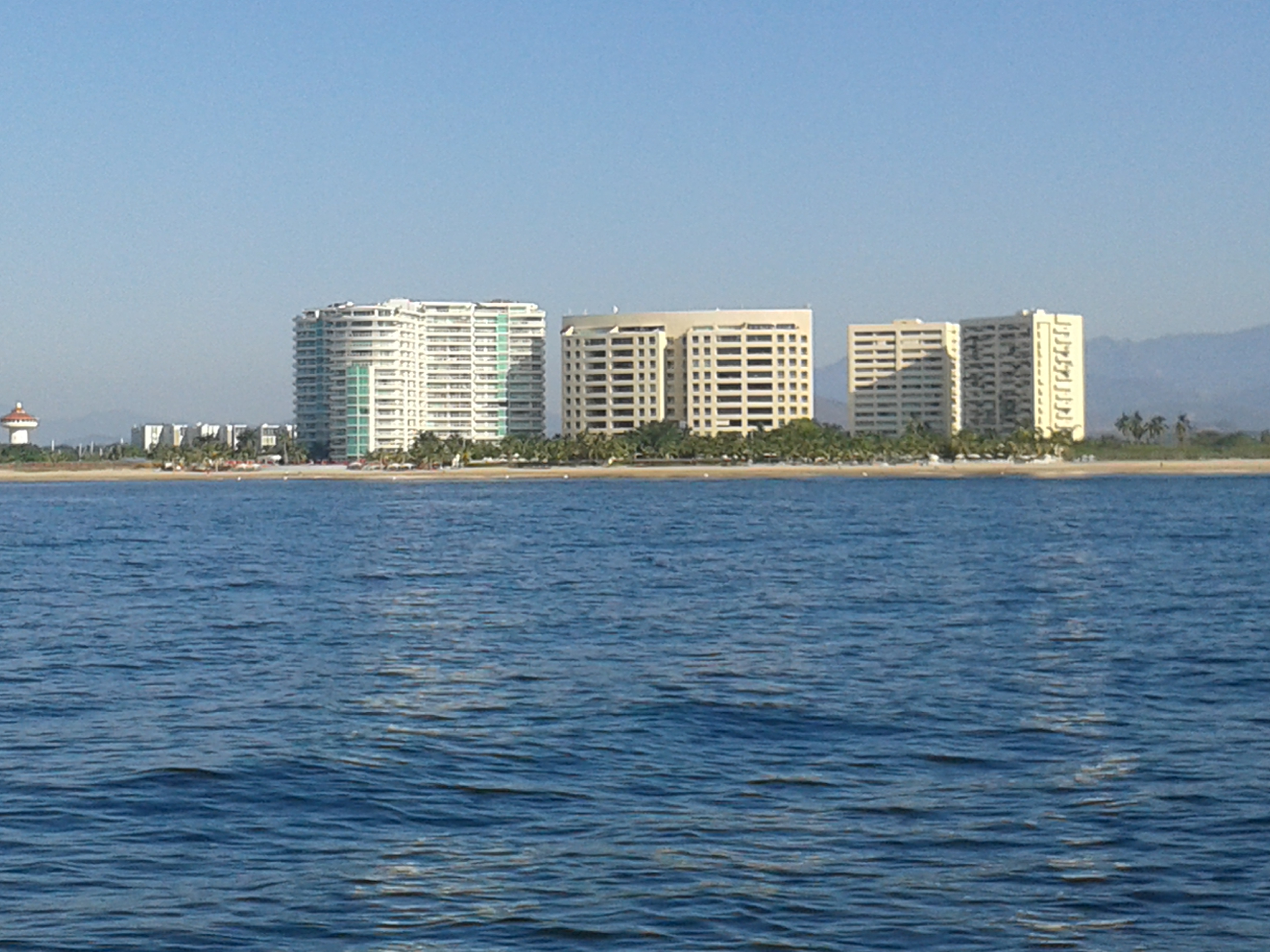
Hotel Zone

== See also ==
- Zihuatanejo
- Isla Ixtapa
