= Raúl Anguiano =

Mexican painter

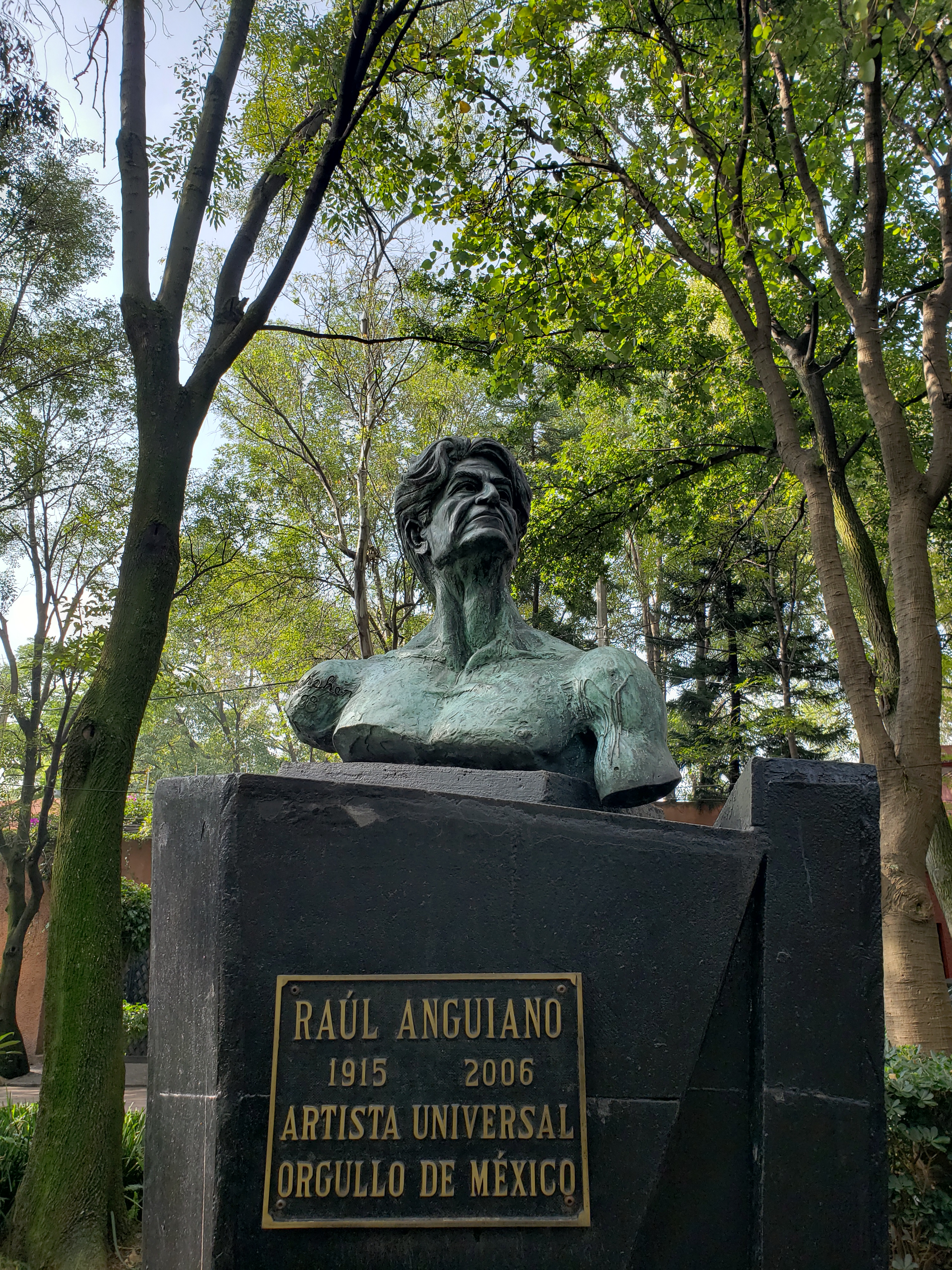
- Bust at Mexico City
- Born: José Raúl Anguiano Valadez; February 26, 1915; Guadalajara, Mexico
- Died: January 13, 2006 (aged 90); Mexico City, Mexico
- Known for: painting
- Movement: Mexican muralism

José Raúl Anguiano Valadez (February 26, 1915 – January 13, 2006) was a notable Mexican painter of the 20th century, part of the "second generation" of Mexican muralists which continued the tradition of Diego Rivera, José Clemente Orozco and David Alfaro Siqueiros but experimented with it as well. Anguiano was born during the height of the Mexican Revolution, which would inspire a majority of his mural painting. He studied painting in his hometown of Guadalajara before moving to Mexico City to begin his career. His first major exhibition was held at the Palacio de Bellas Artes, at age 20. His works include over 100 individual and collective exhibitions with 50 murals, mostly in Mexico and the United States. As he continued his artistry with aspects of the Mexican muralism movement, he also experimented with other styles such as Cubism, Surrealism and Expressionism, with themes such as clowns and prostitutes. However, his most famous painting is "La espina" (The thorn) which depicts a Mayan woman digging a thorn out of her foot with a knife. His later works concentrated on depicting Mexico in vivid colors and traditional imagery.

== Life ==
Raúl Anguiano was born in Guadalajara, Mexico, on February 26, 1915, at the height of the Mexican Revolution. He was the eldest of ten children, whose father was a cobbler.

He began drawing at age five using images of movie stars and other famous people as models, including Mary Pickford, Pola Negri, Charlie Chaplin, Álvaro Obregón, Venustiano Carranza and bullfighter Rodolfo Gaona. Anguiano states that one of his very early artistic influences was a painting of the Holy Family by Rafael Sanzio. At age 12, he left his school to attend Guadalajara's former Escuela Libre de Pintura, where he learned basic artistic techniques and became interested in pre-Hispanic and popular art. He studied with Ixca Farias, José Vizcarar and José Salomé Piña before leaving the school in 1933 to organize a group of painters called Jóvenes Pintores Jaliscienses.

During his studies and early career, Anguiano worked with various models such as workmen, laborers and a few notable people such as Pita Amor. In 1934, he moved to Mexico City, where he met Diego Rivera and José Clemente Orozco and studied their work. He painted his first mural in the same year while in a school and joined the Liga de Escritores y Artistas Revolucionarios.

During Anguiano's long career, almost eight decades, his main studio was in Coyoacán, Mexico City but he had a second home in Huntington Beach, California.

Anguiano died on January 13, 2006, at the Hospital Central Militar in Mexico City after becoming ill with heart problems while in Los Angeles. He was buried at the family crypt at the Panteón Jardín.

== Career ==
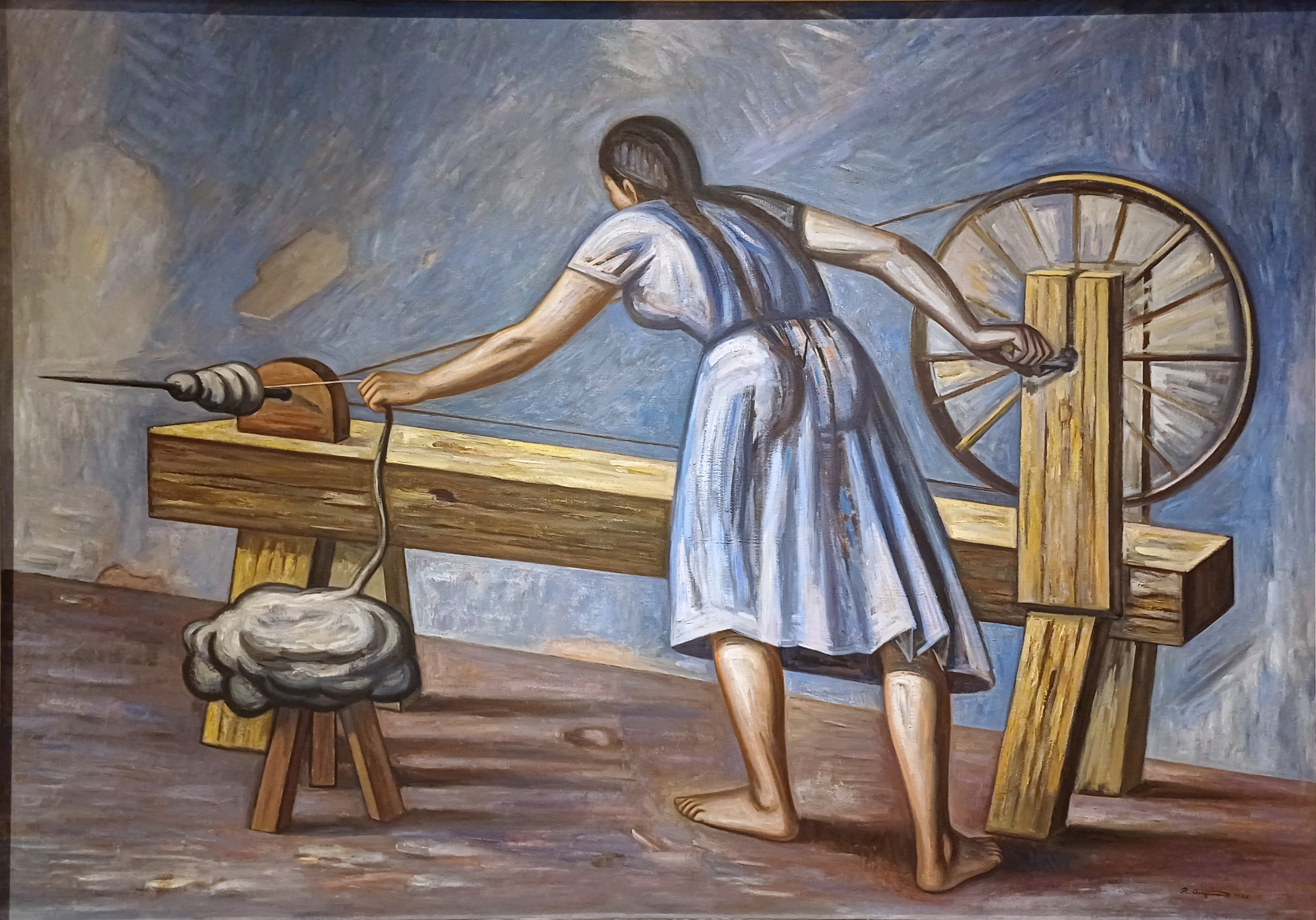
The Spinner (1959) Museo Soumaya

His first major show was in 1935, when he was only twenty. He was the youngest painter to be featured at an exhibition at the Palacio de Bellas Artes. The work at this exhibition was featured with Máximo Pacheco, with themes of industry, factories, smelting and the workers' movement. Since then he has exhibited individually and collectively over one hundred times in museums, galleries and other institutions in countries such as Cuba, Chile, Colombia, Brazil, United States, France, Italy, the former Soviet Union, Israel, Germany and Japan. Some of his exhibitions before he died included a retrospective in Los Angeles for the 1984 Olympic Arts Festival, a presentation of a series of four color lithographs, held at the Hall of Graphic Arts SAGA 88, from 1989 to 1990, in Paris; and the retrospective look at Anguiano's work in graphics (1938-1940), held at the Museo de la Estampa in Mexico City in 1990. His creations remain in permanent collections in the San Francisco Museum of Art, the Smithsonian Institution in Washington, D.C., the Museum of Modern Art in New York, the Royal Museums of Art and History in Brussels, as well as museums in Mexico City, Beijing and the Vatican .

In 1936, when he was only twenty one, he was commissioned to paint his first mural called La educación socialista, a seventy meter wide piece at the Carlos A. Carrillo School in Mexico City. During this career, he painted about fifty murals mostly in Mexico and the United States but murals can also be found in Jamaica and even the Vatican, which houses his mural La Crucifixión.

Some of his more noted murals include Rituales Mayas for the Museo Nacional de la Antropología and Trilogía de Nacionalidad for the Procuraduría General de la República. Other murals in Mexico include those at the Secretaría de Educación Pública, Medio Ambiente y Recursos Naturales and Cámara Nacional de Comercio, all in Mexico City as well as murals in the states of Jalisco and Guanajuato. Most of the U.S. murals are located in California such as The Mayas: Magic, Science and the History of the Maya, in the Bowers Museum in Santa Ana (1999) and his last mural, at the East Los Angeles College, which was also his largest, measuring sixty eight by thirteen feet at the Performing Arts Auditorium. It is an autobiographical work which depicts the history of 20th-century Mexican art and depicts his fellow muralists Rivera, Orozco and David Siqueiros.

From the time he moved to Mexico City in 1934 until close to his death, he was also an art teacher. He began by teaching in the primary schools but most of his teaching was done at the university level. He taught at Escuela de Artes Plásticas at the Universidad Autónoma de México, the La Esmeralda academy and the Universidad Autónoma de la Ciudad de México. His first teaching work in the United States was for a brief time in 1941 and he agreed to teach primary school again in the summer of 2000 at the Santa Ana Unified School District.

Anguiano illustrated several books and about fifty catalogs of his work. He lectured throughout Mexico, the United States and Europe. During an expedition to the Bonampak archeological site, he sketched figures on the murals there, later using them to write a book about the experience called Expedicion a Bonampak first published in 1959.

His art career was also linked to a number of organizations that he joined or created. In 1937, he joined the Liga de Escritores y Artistas Revolucionarios. He was one of the founders of the Taller de Gráfica Popular along with Leopoldo Méndez, Alfredo Zalcoe and Pablo O'Higgins, which produced etchings and lithographs with political themes. He was a founder of the La Esmeralda Academy, Instituto Nacional de Bellas Arts a Bonampak and the Salón de la Plástica Mexicana.

By the time of his death, Anguiano's paintings were selling for over 100,000USD. He was one of the first artists, along with Siqueiros, to take advantage of the Secretaría de Hacienda y Crédito Público's program that allowed artists to pay taxes with artworks. During his life he donated works to charities such as the Red Cross, UNICEF, the Rotary Club, hospitals, and more. Near the end of his life He bequeathed most of his movable works to Mexico City and to a museum named after him in Guadalajara.

Recognitions include the José Clemente Orozco Insignia from the state of Jalisco in 1956, the Medalla de Oro del Salón Panamericano de Arte in Porto Alegre, Brazil, membership in Mexico City's Academy of Arts since 1982 and named Creator Emeritus of the National System to the Creators of Art in 1993.

== Artistry ==
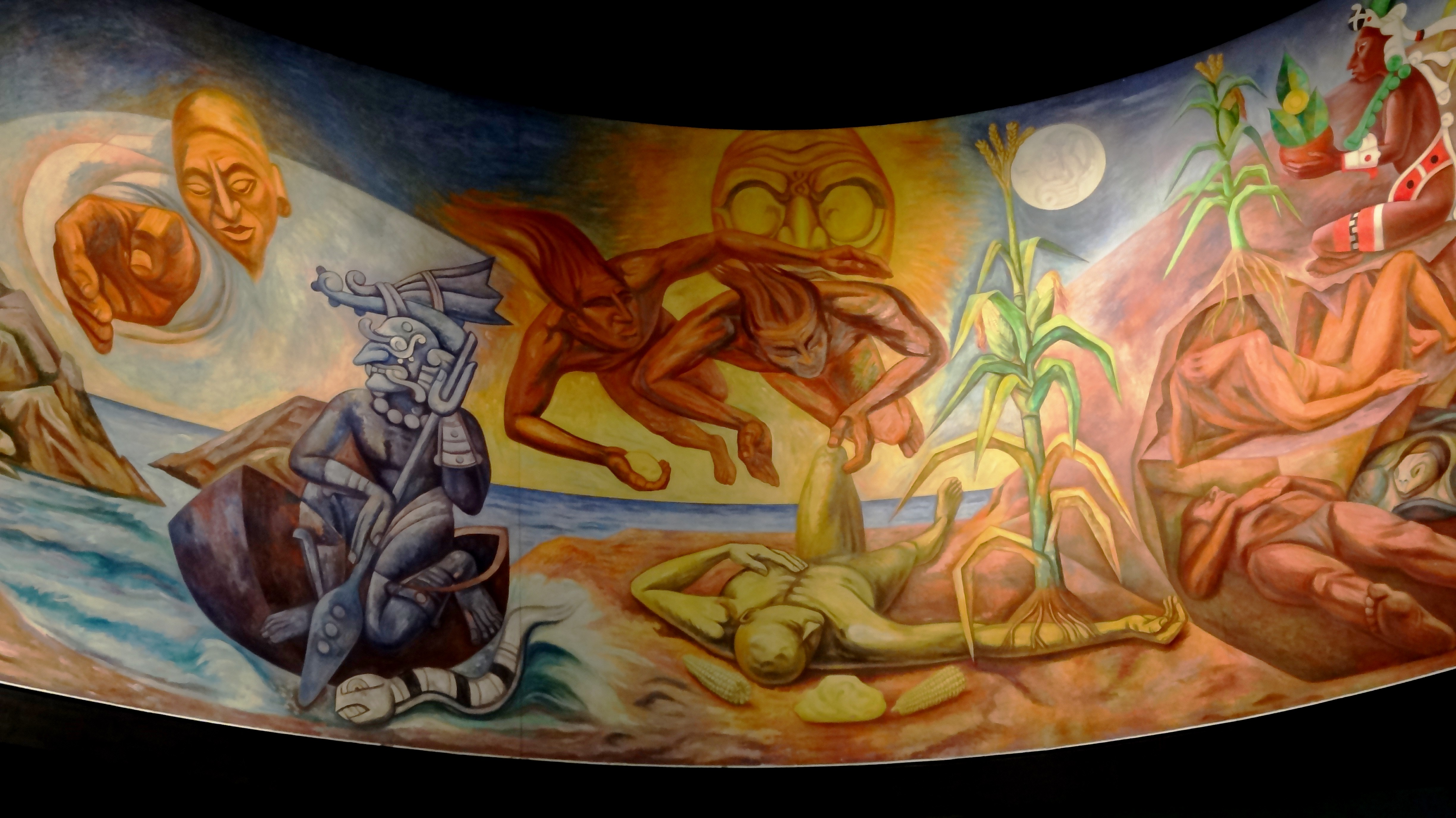
Creación del hombre maya (1964, National Museum of Anthropology).

Anguiano is an important artist of the 20th century, known nationally and best known internationally for his oil paintings depicting the indigenous peoples of Mexico. In addition to oils, he produced etchings, pencil and ink drawings, lithographs, illustrations, sculpture and ceramics.

He is considered to be part of the Mexican muralism movement, although younger than the three most important figures (Rivera, Orozco and Siqueiros) and he was one of the last to work with Diego Rivera. He was part of the continuance of their tradition, called the "second generation" along with Juan O'Gorman, Jorge González Camarena, José Chávez Morado, Alfredo Zalce, Jesús Guerrero Galván and Julio Castellanos. They challenged the political and status quo and experimented with muralism but kept certain traditional artistic canons. He stated "My forms of expression are based on realism, but not on naturalistic realism."

Most of Anguiano's work focuses on indigenous and rural Mexico, its festivals, history traditions and religion, which for him was Mexico. Anguiano's mural work is mostly inspired by the Mexican Revolution and the efforts of those related to Álvaro Obregón afterwards. Oils and other works had themes from pre Hispanic ruins, especially Mayan stele, landscapes and the life and customs of the Lacandon Jungle. Work such as La Espina, Lacandonas asando monos zarahuatos and Nákin de perfil, depicted indigenous as contemporary people, rather than historical. He also depicted the problems facing them such as the destruction of the environment. His work is credited with helping to educate many about rural life in Mexico as well as discrimination against the indigenous. He said that in his work he "sought to glimpse the soul of the Mexican people". He masterpiece is considered to be La Espina, which was used for many years to illustrate public school textbooks. It depicts a Lacandon Maya woman seated and digging a spine out of her foot with a knife. The work sold for $156,000 USD at Christie's Latin American auction in New York on 25 May 2004.

Although firmly a member of the Mexican muralism movement, Anguiano experimented with a number of artistic styles over his career, with his most important influences being Picasso and José Clemente Orozco. Anguiano's earliest works are similar to Cubism, with clear influence from Picasso. He had an important surrealist period from 1936 to about 1946, recreating images from his dreams and his worries about the events of his time. Works from this period include La Llamada del Instanto, Caín, Volviendo a la Tierra and El Sueño Marino, with themes including on circus performers and prostitutes. Also during this period, Anguiano produced a series of drawings based on his dreams, with cold tones and silver-greys predominating. In the 1940s, he painted mostly realistic works, focusing on portraying native Mayan women, after visiting the Lacandon Jungle in Chiapas. From 1957 to 1966 he painted Expressionist works. From 1952 to 1969 he works focused on cinema and returned to Realism in 1970, and from then on, his works feature traditional figurative imagery with vivid color and clear references to Mexico. In addition to his notable work portraying Mexico, one important aspect of his work was the creation of portraits. His notable portraits include those of Alfa Henestrosa, María Asunsolo, Pita Amor, his wife Brigita Anguiano, La Abuela, Cabeza de Viejo and La Muchacha del Abrigo Verde. He also did portraits of many of Mexico’s heroes for textbooks for public schools. He also created lithographs based on popular sayings.

== Raúl Anguiano Museum ==
There are two museums in Mexico dedicated to Anguiano's work in Mexico City and Guadalajara, but the latter is the more important. The Raúl Anguiano Museum was inaugurated in 2003 to provide a space to store and exhibit over one hundred works the artist donated to the state before his death. The museum has a mission of researching and promoting the aesthetic values related to Anguiano's work. It is the newest and most modern of Guadalajara's art museums. It has three exhibition halls on two floors, a multipurpose room and a room for children called Niño Anguiano. There are also workshops, study areas, a patio area with sculptures and twelve murals by various artists in various areas of the museum.

== Museum collections ==
- Art Museum of Southeast Texas, Beaumont, Texas
