= Isla Ixtapa =

Island near Zihuatanejo, Mexico

Coordinates: 17°40′36″N 101°39′23″W

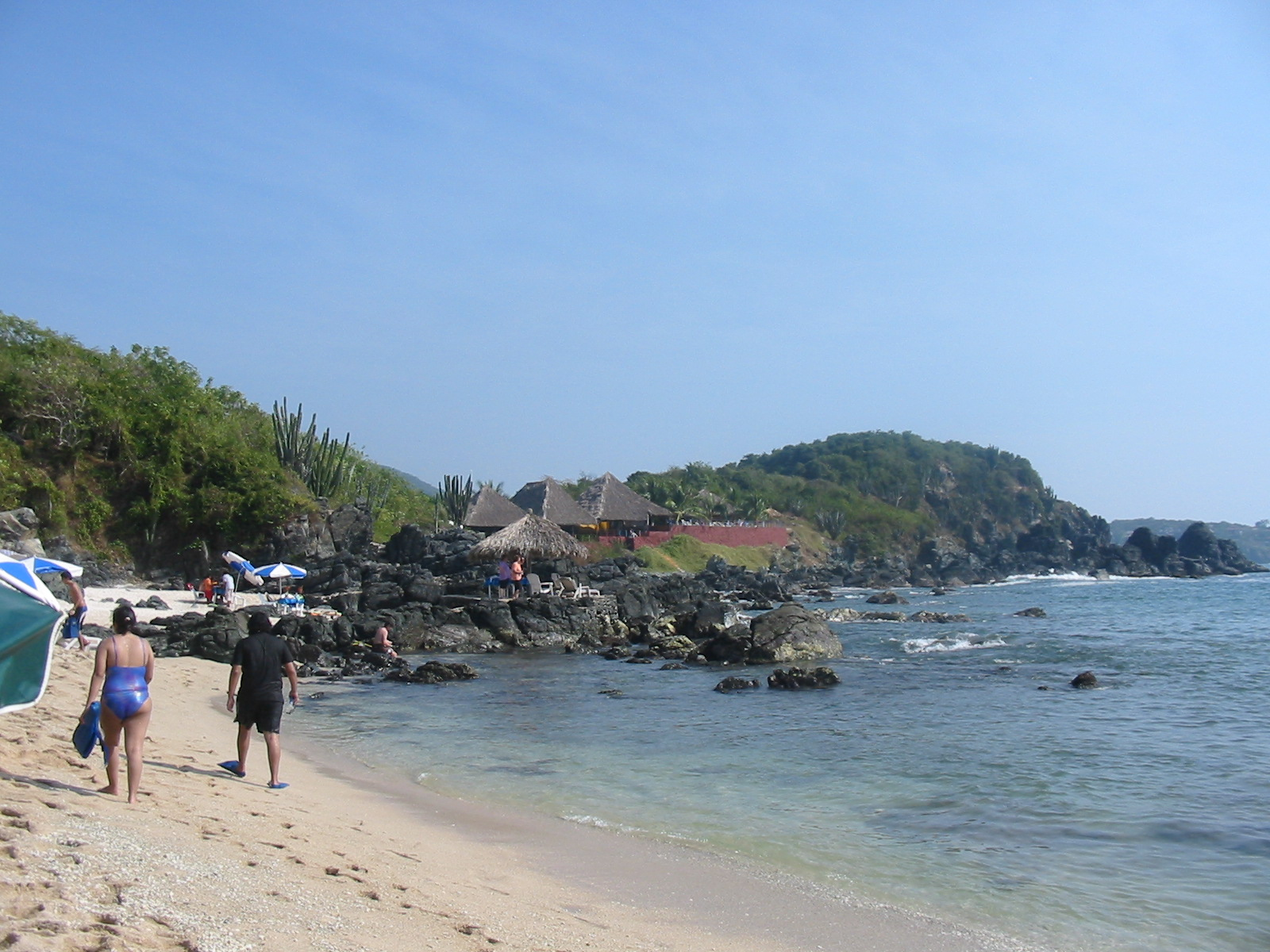
- Coral Beach at Isla Ixtapa. This beach faces open ocean and has a small coral reef just offshore.
- Interactive map of Isla Ixtapa

Administration
- Mexico

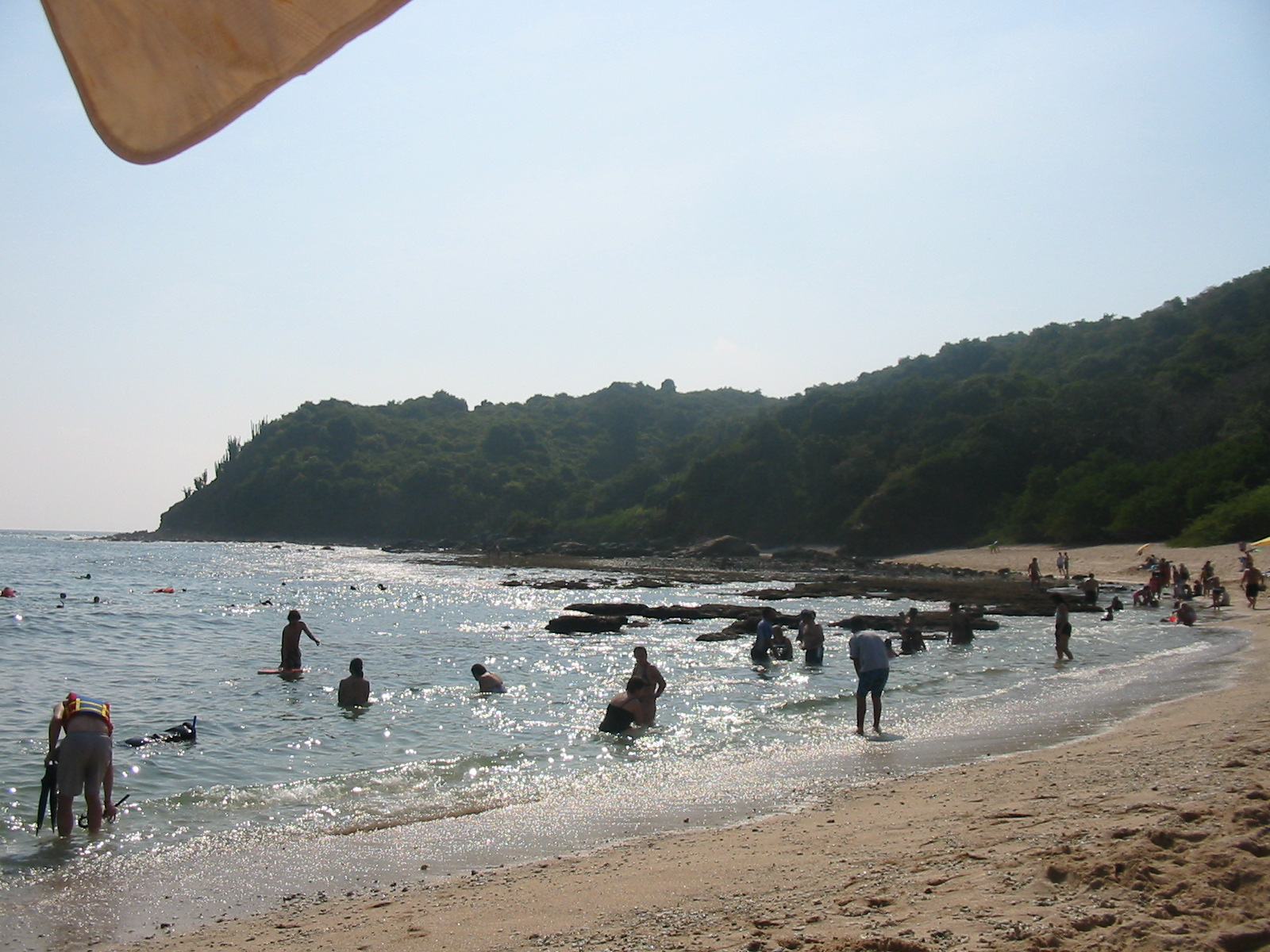
Coral Beach at Isla Ixtapa at low tide.

Isla Ixtapa (Spanish pronunciation: [ˈislajɣsˈtapa]) is a small island near Zihuatanejo (Ixtapa) in the Mexican state of Guerrero.

Three main beaches on Isla Ixtapa are- Playa Varadero, Playa Cuachalalate, and Playa Coral.

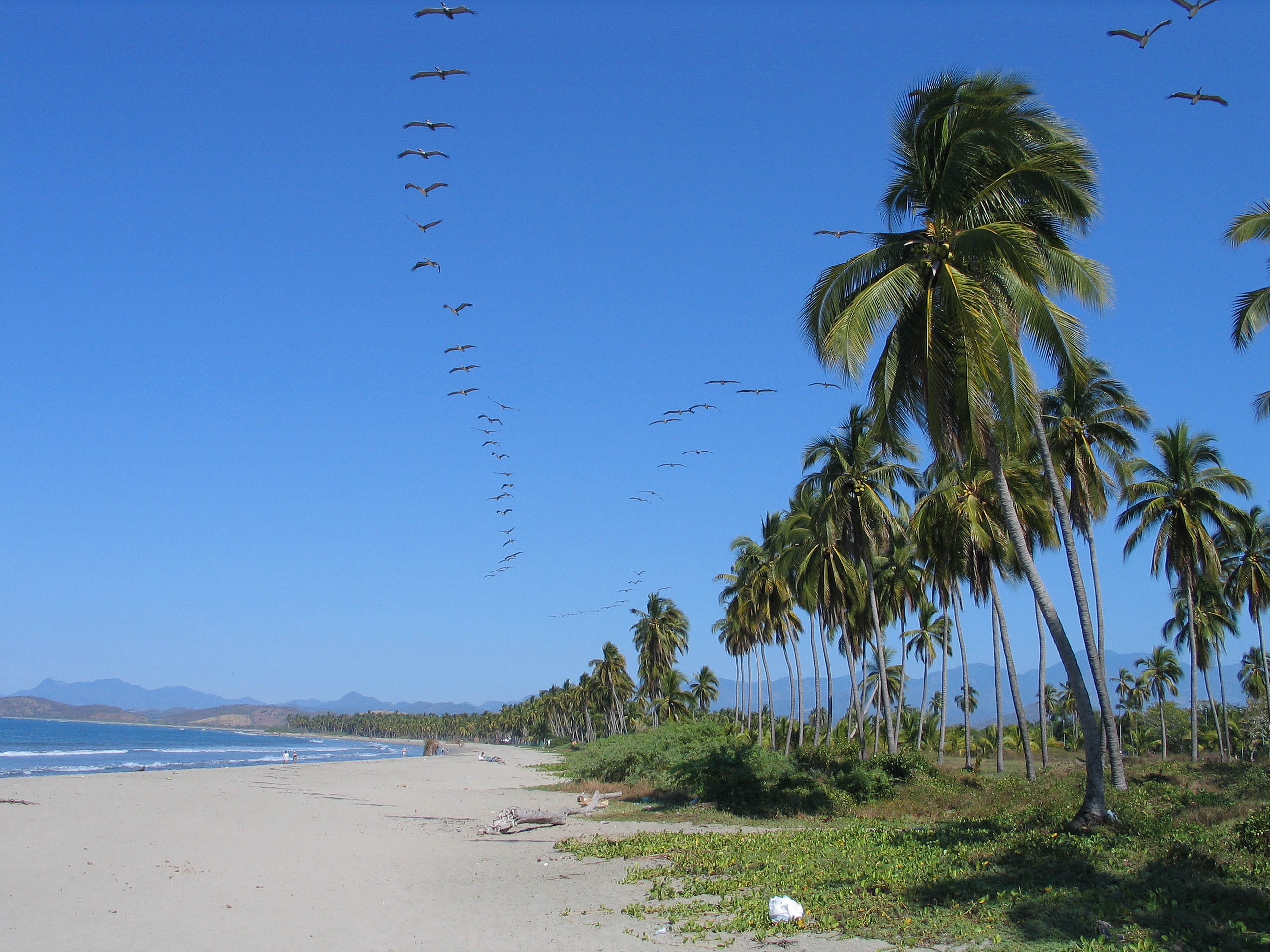
Ixtapa Playa Linda.
