= Roberto Reyes Barreiro =

- Born: June 7, 1871; Izamal, Yucatán, Mexico
- Died: 1928 (aged 56–57); Veracruz, Veracruz, Mexico
- Occupation(s): Physician, political activist
- Known for: Political activism, poetry, journalism

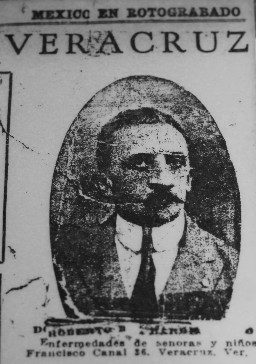

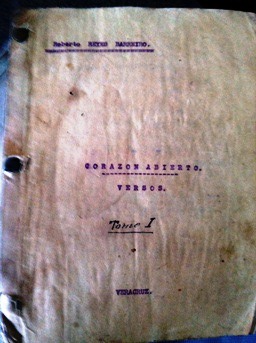

Roberto Reyes Barreiro (1871–1928) was an activist, surgeon, and political leader in the Mexican states of Yucatán and Veracruz. Reyes Barreiro was the founder of the local Red Cross chapter in the city of Veracruz, as well as a 33rd Degree Mason. He was a published author and poet, and wrote articles, essays, short stories, and editorials for the Veracruz newspaper, El Dictamen.

== Early life ==
Born into a family of doctors, attorneys, and intellectuals in Izamal, Yucatán, Roberto Reyes Barreiro was the sixth of 12 children. He graduated with honors from the Universidad Autónoma de Yucatán in Mérida, where he excelled academically as well as in campus politics. It was there that he discovered his oratorical ability and his admiration for Left-leaning thinkers, especially Marx and Engels; Reyes Barreiro leaned to the political Left for the entirety of his adult life.

== Publications ==
Farsa política en Yucatán. La lucha entre el gobierno y el pueblo, Campeche, Imprenta “El Criterio Público”, 1909, prefacio. “El pueblo de hoy no es el de hace treinta años: conoce sus obligaciones y sus derechos.” Roberto Reyes Barreiro, 1909. (Political Farce In Yucatán. The Struggle Between The Government and the People, Compeche, Printed in "The Public Criterion", 1909, preface.) ("The citizenry of today is not what it was 30 years ago: it knows its obligations and its rights"—English Translation)

== Medicine and activism ==
He practiced medicine in Yucatán following his graduation for a short period before his socialist views got him into trouble with the government, and he was expelled from the state. Moving first to Mexico City with relatives, then later to the port city of Veracruz, he met and married a young nurse, Edilberta Baquedano, and started a practice to treat the city's poorest residents. True to his heart, Reyes Barreiro preached the gospel of Left politics to his patients and to anyone who would listen. He spent many long hours making his rounds on horseback and, when possible, by carriage, often toting his doctor bag and several books on politics, poetry, science and medicine. During the Mexican Revolution (1910–1920), Reyes Barreiro was often one of the few people allowed on the streets after dark during the curfew, to tend to his patients, revolutionaries, friends and foes alike.

=== Doctor to an icon ===
On May 1, 1914, during the invasion of Veracruz by the American Frank Friday Fletcher, Reyes Barreiro was among the surgeons attending to the noted Mexican hero José Azueta. When Fletcher's U.S. Marine forces shot and injured Azueta, it was doctors Reyes Barreiro and Rafael Cuervo Xicoy who tended Azueta's wounds. When Fletcher heard of Azueta's bravery in battle, he sent an envoy to ask for Azueta's permission to call and pay his respects. Azueta, receiving Fletcher's request, relayed his answer through Reyes Barreiro (the surgeon on duty when the envoy called): "I am armed only with my service pistol, but if the American [Fletcher] sets one foot in my house I will take either his life or mine." Fletcher, upon hearing this response from Azueta, then offered to send his personal physician to care for Azueta and his wounds. Azueta's answer was "Please tell the admiral that I am in the best care that medicine has to offer, either in Mexico or the United States." Azueta died on May 10, 1914, from his wounds, a week after his 20th birthday.

=== Veracruz Red Cross ===
In 1918, Reyes Barreiro and several other doctors gathered to discuss the founding of a Red Cross chapter in the port of Veracruz. On January 2, 1919, a formal sub-chapter of the Red Cross in Veracruz was granted by the main Red Cross chapter in Orizaba. For the first time in the almost 400 years since its founding, the people of Veracruz had a formal place to turn in the time of emergencies, revolution and chaos.

=== Tenant advocacy ===
Reyes Barreiro was later noted as the leader of the Movimiento Inquilinario ("Tenants' Union") of Veracruz. In 1927, rents in Veracruz were climbing higher and higher, with the majority of an average citizen's wage going toward rent. Tenants grew increasingly agitated by the situation and decided to go on "strike" by ceasing rent payments, electing Reyes Barreiro as their leader. Reyes Barreiro was opposed by another local activist, communist Heron Proal, who later led the group of tenants in their struggle against the injustices of the landlords. Reyes Barreiro is noted as the source of the quote "The citizenry of today is not as it was 30 years ago—it knows its rights and responsibilities." The Tenants' Strike in Veracruz served as a model for later strikers in Mexico, the United States and around the world. From that point forward tenants, dockworkers, revolutionaries and even prostitutes used the example set by the Veracruz Renters to model their own strikes against perceived oppressors.

== Personal life ==
Reyes Barreiro was a founding member of one of Veracruz's Freemasonic temples and, throughout his life in that city, wrote extensively for the newspaper El Dictamen. He favored poetry—most notably love poems—but also distinguished himself as a keen observer of life while making his rounds in revolutionary Veracruz.

=== Death ===
Reyes Barreiro died in 1928 at the age of 51 in Veracruz, leaving behind a wife and ten adult children. Police ruled Reyes Barreiro's death a suicide; however, he was found with two lethal gunshot wounds to the head from two different angles. Due to the suspicious circumstances of his death, it is speculated that he was assassinated by the federal government.
