= Zihuatanejo de Azueta =

Municipality in the Mexican state of Guerrero

- Municipality
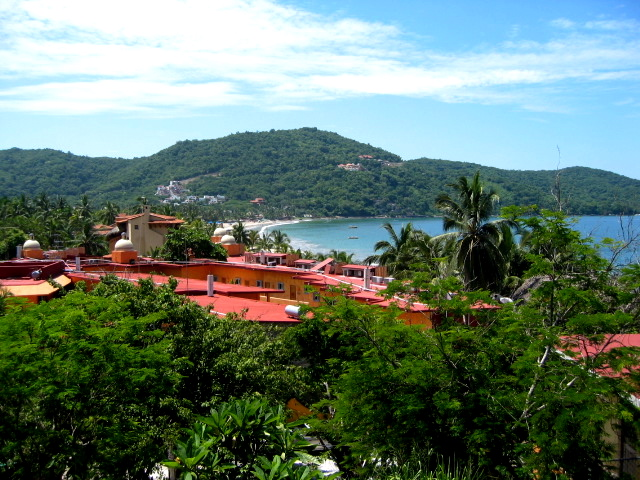
- Partial view over Playa la Ropa

- Coat of arms

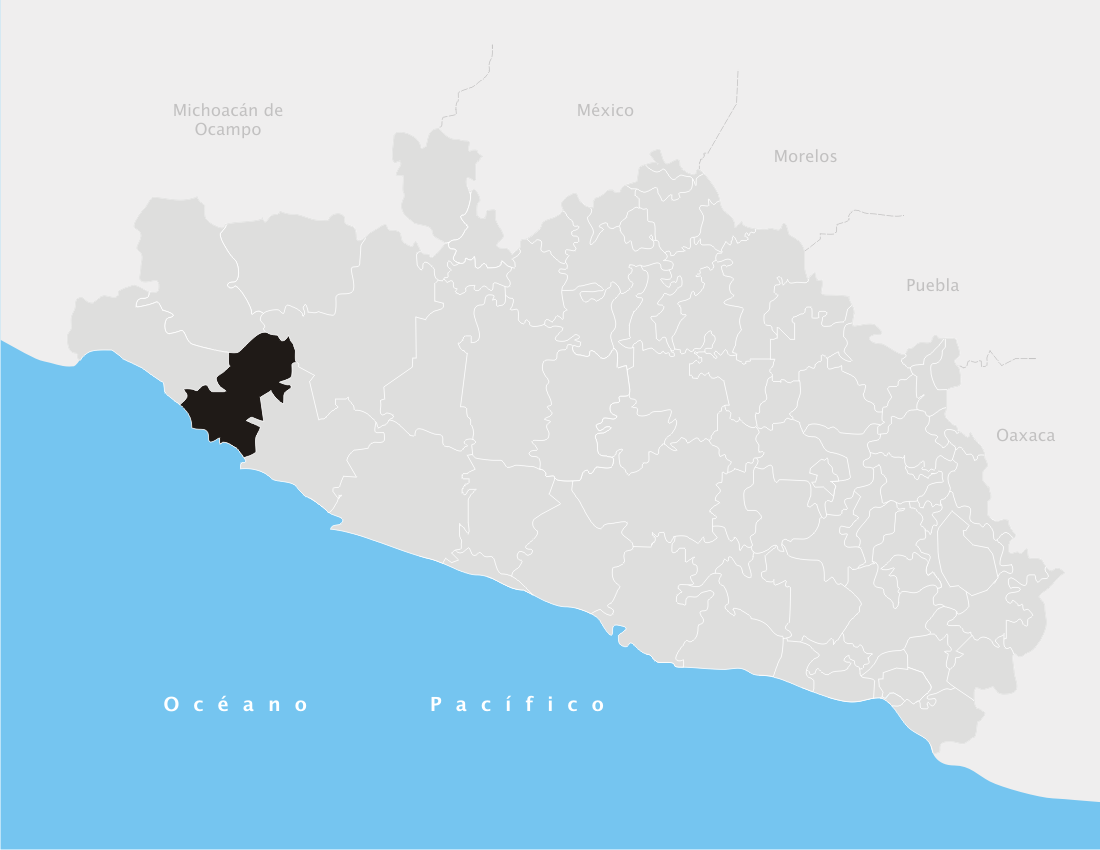
- Municipality of Zihuatanejo de Azueta in Guerrero

- Location in Mexico
- Coordinates: 17°40′0″N 101°34′0″W
- Country: Mexico
- State: Guerrero
- Municipal seat: Zihuatanejo
- Municipality created: 23 December 1953

Area
  - Total: 1,468 km^{2} (567 sq mi)

Population (2020)
  - Total: 126,000
- Website: https://zihuatanejodeazueta.gob.mx/

Zihuatanejo de Azueta is a municipality in the Mexican state of Guerrero. It includes the major resort communities of Zihuatanejo and Ixtapa in addition to numerous other towns. In 2010 it had a population of 118,211 inhabitants. It has an area of 1468 km^{2} (567 sq mi). Its municipal seat is the city of Zihuatanejo. Its municipal president for the 2005-08 period was Silvano Blanco Deaquino.

== History ==
It was created on 23 December 1953 and named in honour of Lt. José Azueta, a hero of the 1914 United States occupation of Veracruz. It formally changed its name from "municipality of José Azueta" to "municipality of Zihuatanejo de Azueta" on 6 May 2008.

== Major communities ==
- El Coacoyul
- Ixtapa
- Pantla
- San José Ixtapa (Barrio Viejo)
- Zihuatanejo

== See also ==
- Mexican Federal Highway 200
