= José Azueta =

Mexican naval officer

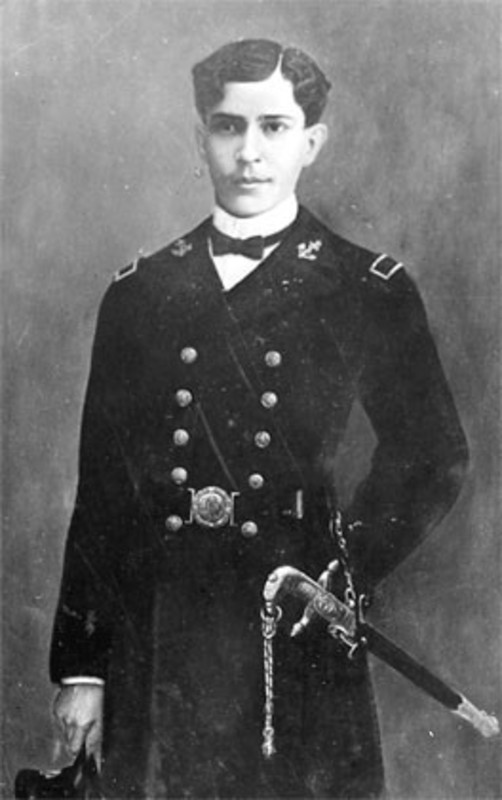
- Azueta in Mexico City c. 1913
- Born: José Azueta Abad; May 2, 1895; Acapulco, Guerrero, Mexico
- Died: May 10, 1914 (aged 19); Veracruz, Mexico
- Military career
- Allegiance: Mexico
- Branch: Mexican Navy
- Rank: Captain
- Conflicts: Mexican Revolution; United States occupation of Veracruz (DOW)

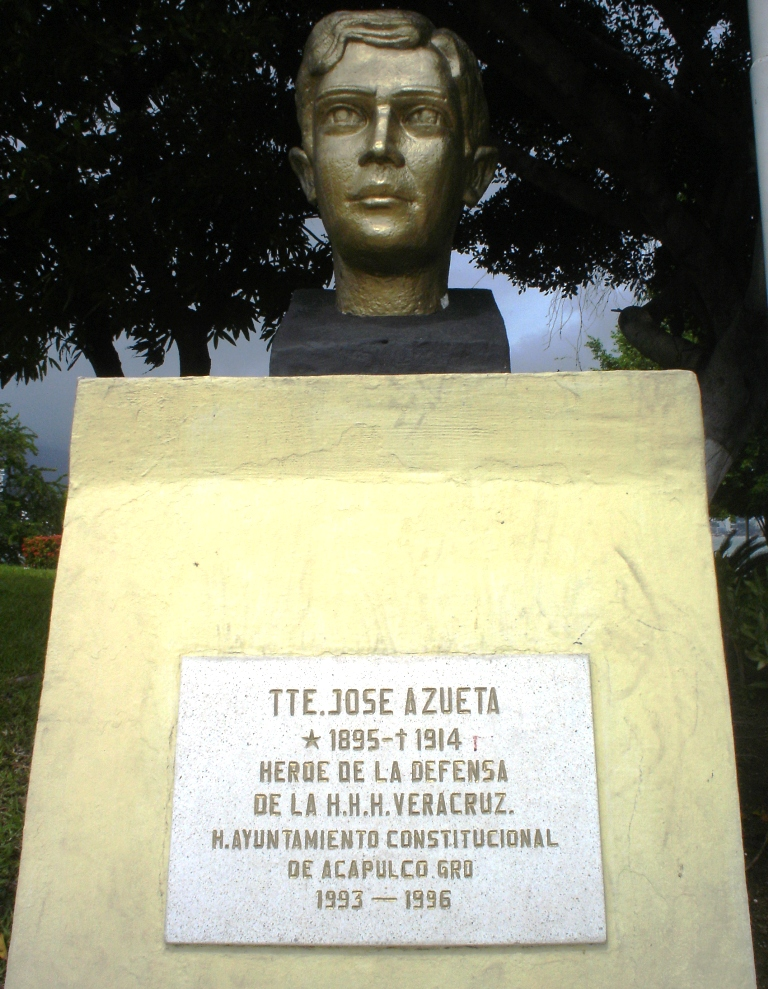
Monument to José Azueta in the Plaza de la H. Escuela Naval Militar in the Parque de La Reina in Acapulco.

José Azueta Abad (May 2, 1895 – May 10, 1914), usually known as José Azueta, was a Mexican Navy lieutenant who became famous for his role in the United States occupation of Veracruz, where he was fatally wounded. He is one of the most revered national heroes in Veracruz.

== Early life and education ==
Born in Guerrero on May 2, 1895, son to Commodore Manuel Azueta Perillos and Josefa Abad. Due to the labor of his father in military service, the family moved to the port of Veracruz. There he completed basic education in José Miguel Macías of Veracruz School where he showed quick progress especially at discipline and behavior. At age 11, his father was promoted to Captain of the ship to the Director of the Naval Academy, at that time, Jose showed his interest and affection for the profession of his father, and in 1909 he began taking classes at the Navy school. At 15, he applied to the Naval Academy and was approved on August 27.

The son of Rear Admiral Manuel Azueta, commander of the Veracruz Naval Academy, Lieutenant Azueta was wounded on April 21, 1914, the first day of the invasion.

== Career ==
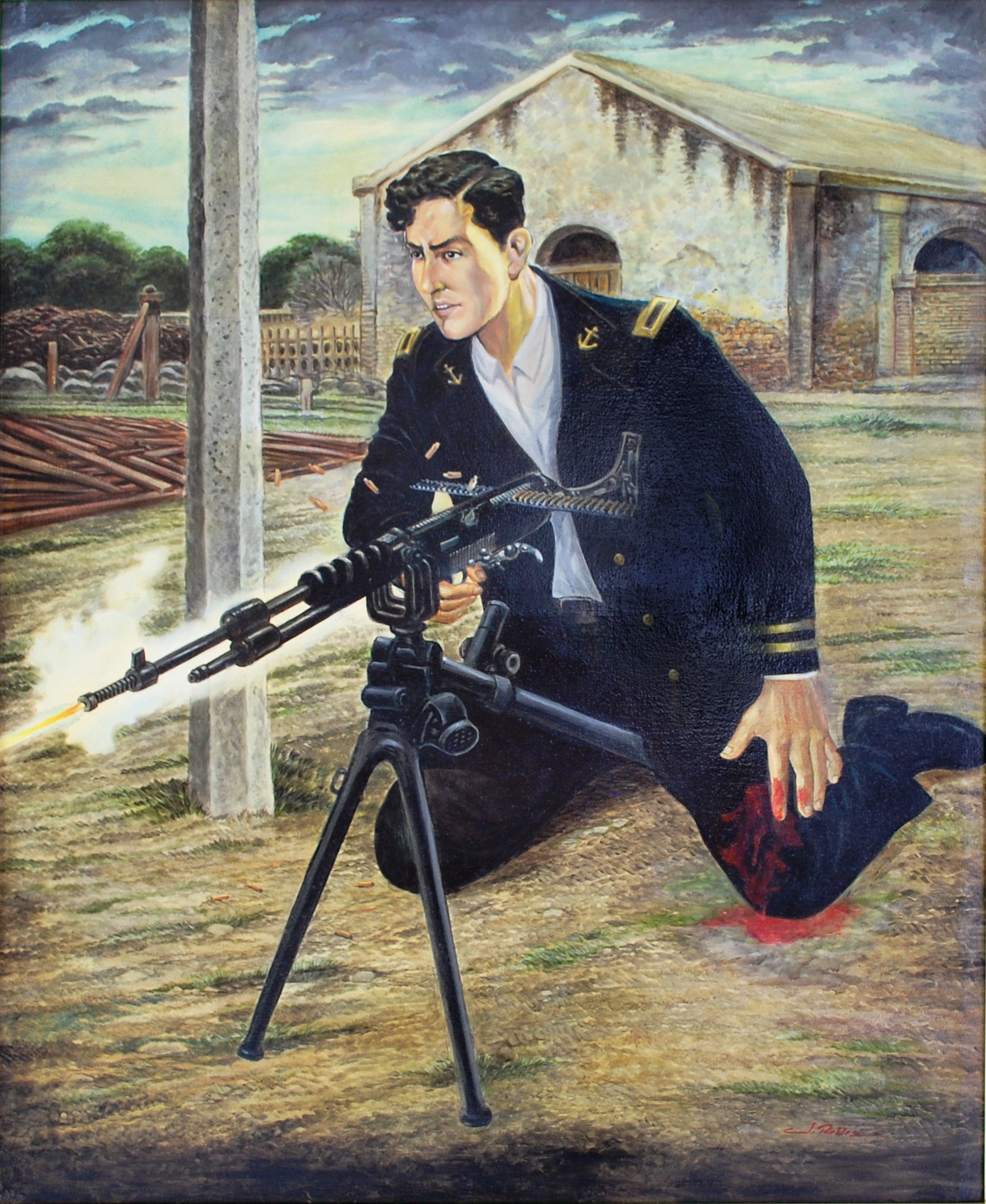
Artistic depiction of a wounded Azueta firing a French Hotchkiss machine gun during the Battle of Veracruz. Painting displayed at the Naval Historical Museum in Mexico City

Azueta was manning a machine gun placed outside the building, facing the incoming U.S. troops on his own and causing a number of casualties. After having been severely wounded by U.S. Navy marksman Joseph G. Harner, who took several shots at him from about 300 yards (270 m) away, he was rescued from the battlefield and taken to his home.

After the battle, U.S. Rear Admiral (later Admiral) Frank Friday Fletcher heard of Azueta's actions and sent word to him via messenger that he (Fletcher) wished to visit the fallen defender and pay his respects. Azueta—through his surgeon and local political activist Dr. Roberto Reyes Barreiro—sent word to Fletcher refusing the visit, saying "If the American (Fletcher) enters my house, I will either kill him or myself." Fletcher then offered to send his personal doctor to take care of him. However, Azueta refused medical services offered by the occupation army and only allowed local Dr. Rafael Cuervo Xicoy to treat him. Dr. Xicoy lacked medical supplies to assist Azueta properly. Fletcher has never been credited for his unusual offer of medical care for a wounded enemy who had caused injuries and casualties to the American servicemen.

On April 24, Lieutenant Azueta was promoted immediately to captain by the President of the Republic for his performance in combat. On April 29, he was awarded a gold medal with the Decoration of the Second U.S. Invasion. Again on May 1, he was issued the 3rd Class Military Merit medal.

Azueta died of his wounds on May 10, Mexico's Mother's Day. At the time of his death, Lt. Azueta was being cared for by the surgeon Reyes Barreiro.

During his funeral hundreds of citizens marched holding his coffin on their shoulders to the city's cemetery in open defiance to directives from the occupation army forbidding assembly.

== Legacy ==
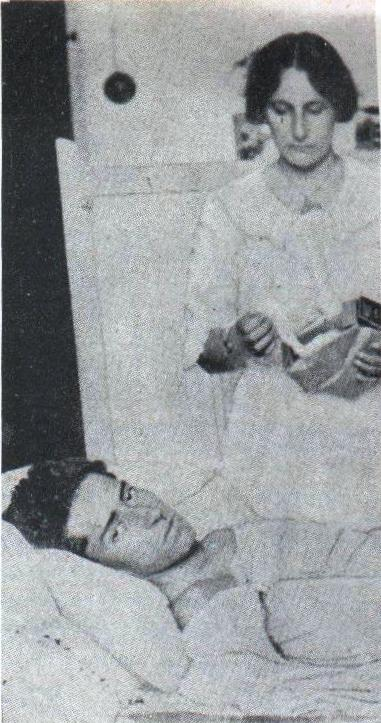
José Azueta, hospitalized (Archivo General de la Nación)

The municipalities of Zihuatanejo de Azueta, Guerrero, and José Azueta, Veracruz, were named after him.
