= Máximo Pacheco Miranda =

Mexican muralist (1905–1992)

Máximo Pacheco
- Born: 1905; Huichapan, Hidalgo, Mexico
- Died: 1992
- Education: National School of Fine Arts
- Movement: Mexican muralism

Máximo Pacheco Miranda (1905–1992) was a Mexican painter of Otomi heritage associated with the Mexican muralism movement in the post-Revolutionary period of the early 20th century.

== Life ==
Máximo Pacheco Miranda was born into a family with Otomi roots in Huichapan, Hidalgo, in 1905. After a difficult childhood – his mother died young and his father enrolled as a revolutionary with the forces of Francisco Villa – he relocated to Mexico City in 1918 and enrolled in the National School of Fine Arts. There, he began to associate with the artists behind the incipient muralism movement.

Pacheco was one of Diego Rivera's assistants on the murals he painted at the offices of the Secretariat of Public Education in central Mexico City between 1923 and 1929 and at the main campus of Chapingo Autonomous University in Texcoco, State of Mexico, between 1923 and 1927. He also assisted Fermín Revueltas with his murals at the National Preparatory School in Mexico City.

His first independent commission was a series of frescoes at Domingo Faustino Sarmiento Primary School (Note: Domingo Faustino Sarmiento, an educational theorist and member of the Generation of 1837 intellectual circle, was President of Argentina from 1868 to 1874.) in the Jardín Balbuena neighbourhood of Mexico City, which opened its doors in 1927. He also painted a fresco for the library of Secretary of Public Education José Manuel Puig Casauranc (Note: Puig Casauranc served two terms as education secretary: 1924–1928 and 1930–1931.) at his home in Lomas de Chapultepec and, alongside Jesús Guerrero Galván, Raúl Anguiano and Roberto Reyes Pérez, a series of murals for the headquarters of the Emiliano Zapata Campesino Confederation in the city of Puebla in 1935.

Between 1925 and 1950 more than 150 murals painted at public schools were destroyed by the Secretariat of Public Education (SEP) and many others have been irreparably damaged; much of Pacheco's work met that fate, and many of his artworks have survived only in photographs taken by Tina Modotti.

In 1938, acting on medical advice, Pacheco stopped painting and took up teaching in a position awarded to him by the SEP. He died in 1992.

== Legacy ==
A gallery at the Regional Cultural Centre in his home town of Huichapan bears Pacheco Miranda's name.
