= Costa Grande of Guerrero =

Sociopolitical region in Guerrero, Mexico

Coordinates: 17°15′N 100°57′W

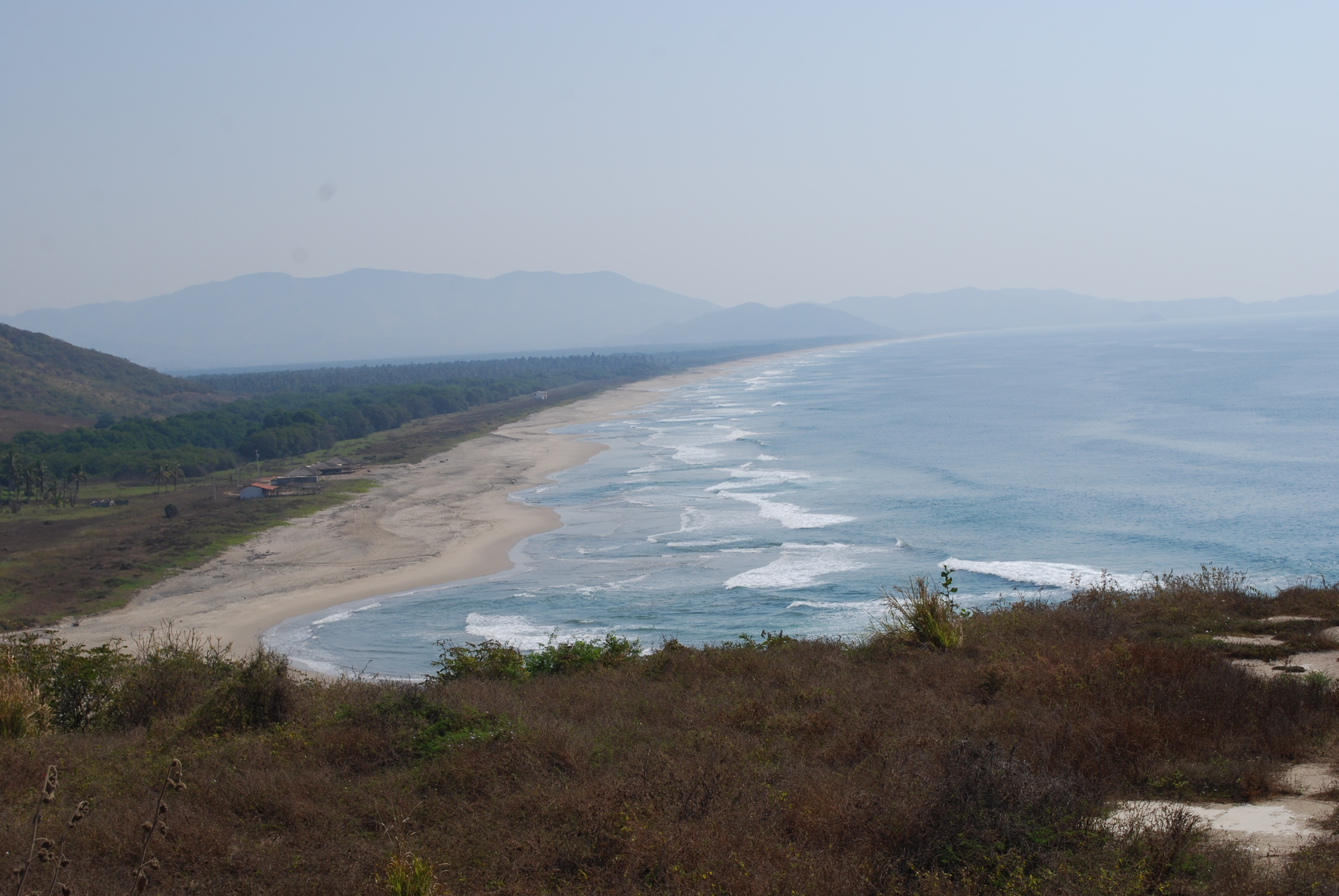
View of El Calvario Beach on the Costa Grande

Costa Grande in Guerrero

Costa Grande of Guerrero is a sociopolitical region located in the Mexican state of Guerrero, along the Pacific Coast. It makes up 325 km (202 mi) of Guerrero's approximately 500 km (311 mi) coastline, extending from the Michoacán border to the Acapulco area, wedged between the Sierra Madre del Sur and the Pacific Ocean. Acapulco is often considered part of the Costa Grande; however, the government of the state classifies the area around the city as a separate region. The Costa Grande roughly correlates to the Cihuatlán province of the Aztec Empire, which was conquered between 1497 and 1504. Before then, much of the area belonged to a dominion under the control of the Cuitlatecs, but efforts by both the Purépecha Empire and Aztec Empire to expand into this area in the 15th century brought this to an end. Before the colonial period, the area had always been sparsely populated with widely dispersed settlements. The arrival of the Aztecs caused many to flee and the later arrival of the Spanish had the same effect. For this reason, there are few archeological remains; however, recent work especially at La Soledad de Maciel has indicated that the cultures here are more important than previously thought. Today, the area economically is heavily dependent on agriculture, livestock, fishing and forestry, with only Zihuatanejo and Ixtapa with significantly developed infrastructure for tourism. The rest of the coast has been developed spottily, despite some government efforts to promote the area.

== Geography and nature ==
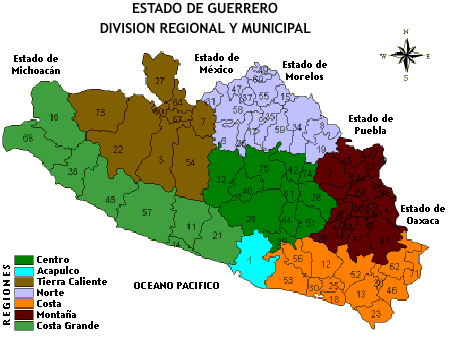
Regional map of Guerrero with the Costa Grande in light green

The Costa Grande is one of seven sociopolitical regions of the state of Guerrero and part of one of three environmental regions. Environmentally, the state is divided into La Montaña (The Mountain) region in the north, the Tierra Caliente (Hot Land) in the west and La Costa (The Coast). La Costa includes the approximately 500 km (311 mi) of coastline that the state has which roughly extends from northwest to southeast. This coastline is then divided into La Costa Grande and La Costa Chica (Small Coast), roughly divided by the Acapulco Bay. Acapulco is often considered to be part of the Costa Grande; however, the government of Guerrero officially considers the area around the city of Acapulco to be a separate region. The Costa Grande covers most of the Guerrero coast, extending 325 km (202 mi) from the Balsas River on the Michoacán border, southeast to Acapulco. Starting from Michoacán, the Costa Grande extends from the Balsas delta south to Ixtapa and Zihuatanejo. It then moves east to the Morro de Papanoa. From here southeast to Acapulco Bay, there is almost uninterrupted beach. Compared to other areas of the state, most of the Costa Grande is fertile, relatively flat land. The Costa Grande is politically divided into seven municipalities Atoyac de Álvarez, Coyuca de Benítez, José Azueta, La Unión, Petatlán, Benito Juárez/San Jerónimo, Coahuayutla de José María Izazaga and Tecpan de Galeana with an overall territory of 2,500 km^{2} (965 sq mi).

The area consists of the edge of the Sierra Madre del Sur, against the Pacific Ocean. This part of the Sierra Madre del Sur is known as the Nudo Mixteco (literally Mixteca knot) or the Nudo Zempoltepetl. The area consists of flat areas and areas with rolling hills, bordered rugged mountains cut by a number of canyons which mostly flow from the interior of the state to the ocean. While much of the area is mountainous, it has a significant amount of flat areas and rolling plains compared to the rest of the state, separated from the ocean by sandy beaches. The area is economically most important as an agricultural region, with little in the way of mineral deposits such as in the north of the state around Taxco.

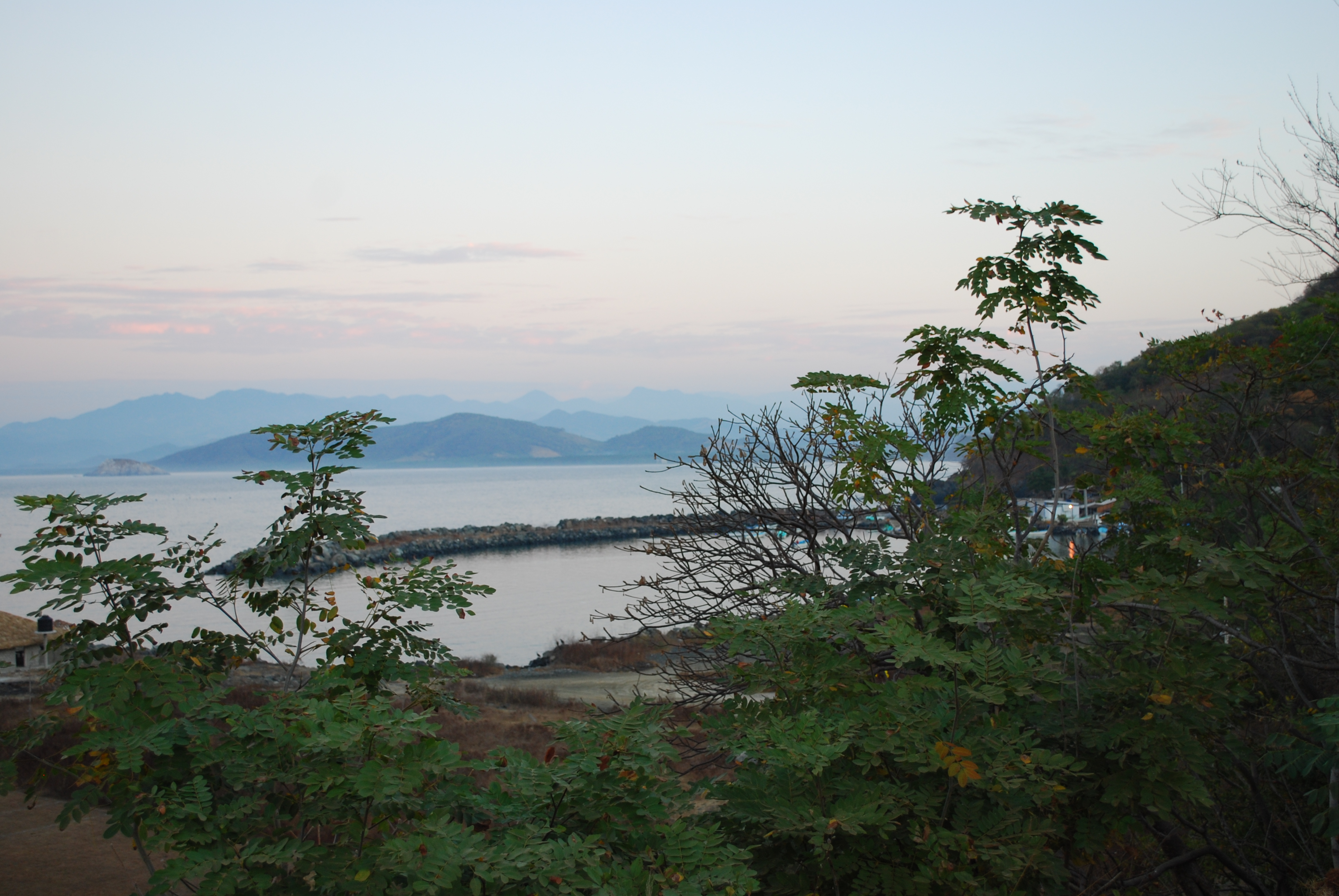
View from Puerto Vicente Guerrero

Climate and hydrology of the area are supported by moisture flow from the Pacific Ocean. Most of this moisture is deposited in the higher mountain areas of the state, which produce the various rivers and streams that eventually empty along the coastline. Most water flow in the area goes directly into the Pacific but a smaller portion in the north flows to the Pacific via the Balsas River on the border with Michoacán, locally known as the Zacatula River. The Unión River begins at the Puerto De Maguey as an arroyo known as Guadalupe. It extends 40 kilometers (25 miles) and has El Naranjo, San Cristóbal, Fuberias, del Valle and San Miguel as tributaries. The Ixtapa River begins high in the mountain area and has the Montón River and the Guayabas arroyo as tributaries. The Jeronimito River is formed by the union of the Cruces and Murga arroyos. It extends for 27 kilometers (17 miles) before emptying into the Laguna Colorada. The Petatlán River begins in a mountain area called Los Lobos. It has numerous arroyos as tributaries and extends for 68 km (42 mi). The Coyuquilla River is formed by the joining of the Lama Vallo and Florida Rivers. It extends for 42 km (26 mi) and empties into the Tequepa Bay. The San Luis River flows from a mountain area called Cumbres de la Tentación for 56 km (35 mi). The Nusco river begins at Pitón Mountain where the Chilas and Marta arroyos joint. The Tecpan River begins at the Puerto de Conejo and extends for 75 km (47 mi). The San Jerónimo Atoyac River begins in Rincón Grande and extends for 50 km (31 mi). The Coyuca River begins at Tres Tetas Mountain and cuts across the municipality of Coyuca de Benitez. El Salto is waterfall located an hour and a half from the town of Coyuca. It was the setting for a scene in the move Rambo: First Blood Part II, and has since been nicknamed "La Cascada de Rambo" (Rambo's Waterfall).

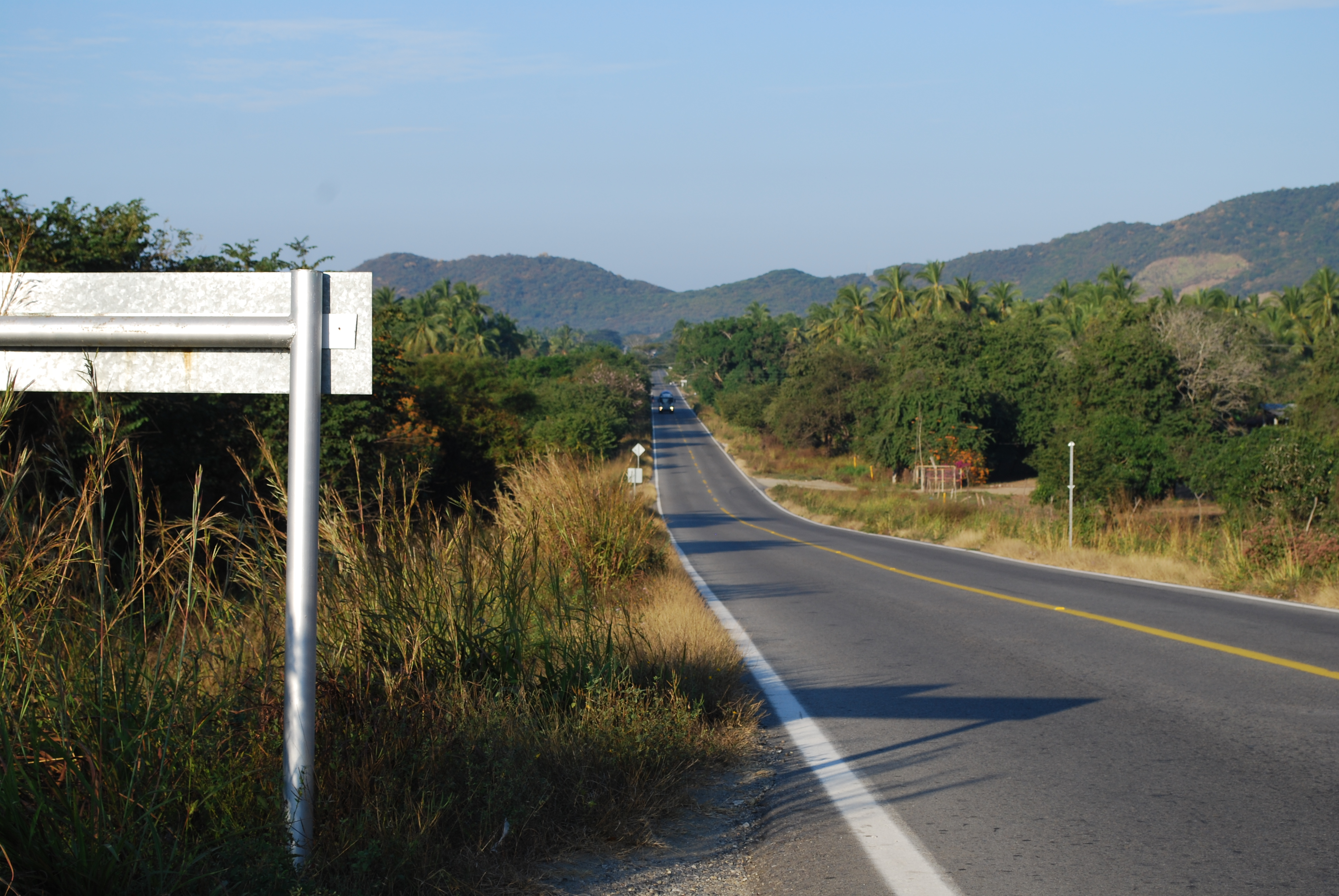
Highway 200 near Playa Tlalcoyunque

All of the coast of Guerrero is considered to be generally rainy and tropical with a classification of Awo"2ig), but temperature and humidity can vary. There are some arid areas, and while most of the area is under 2,000 m (6,562 ft) asl and considered to be hot with year-round temperatures over 18 °C (64.4 °F) and average high temperatures of about 30 °C (86 °F), there are some areas above this altitude, which are considered temperate. These high peaks are usually covered in clouds, as moisture from the Pacific condenses there. The area is considered to be semi humid, with rains occurring mostly from June to September. However, much of the rainfall is concentrated in the higher mountains areas. These two facts tend to limit agriculture to one season and dependent on the various small rivers and streams of the region.

Vegetation in the area is divided into land and sea. Land vegetation includes evergreen tropical forest dominated by Bravaisia integerrima, Hymenaea courbaril, and Manilkara zapota, deciduous tropical forest (the most abundant) dominated by Amphypterigium adstringens, Cochlosperum vitifolium, Cordia dentada, and C. elaeagnoides, semideciduous tropical forest dominated by Astronium graveolens, Enterolobium cyclocarpum, Annona primigenia, and Bursera arborea, areas with dry scrubland with species such as Acacia cochilacantha, Guaiacum coulteri, Krameria cuspidate, and Crossopetalum puberulum, and sandy beach areas with Ipomoea pes-caprae, Heliotropium curassavicum, and Okenia hypogaea. In lagoon areas, mangroves are evident as well. Economically important are the vast tracts of forest which cover the mountain areas, with 226,203 hectares (558,960 acres) of forest in the Sierra de Petatlán and Coyuca de Benitéz alone as of 2007. Economically important species include amate (a type of fig and a traditional source of paper pulp), holm oak, various pine species, especially ocote, and oyamel. In many areas, especially in Troncones and Majahua, low hills of tropical deciduous forests stand next to the sea. Fauna is extremely varied with both land and aquatic species. Land species vary by altitude.

== The coastline ==
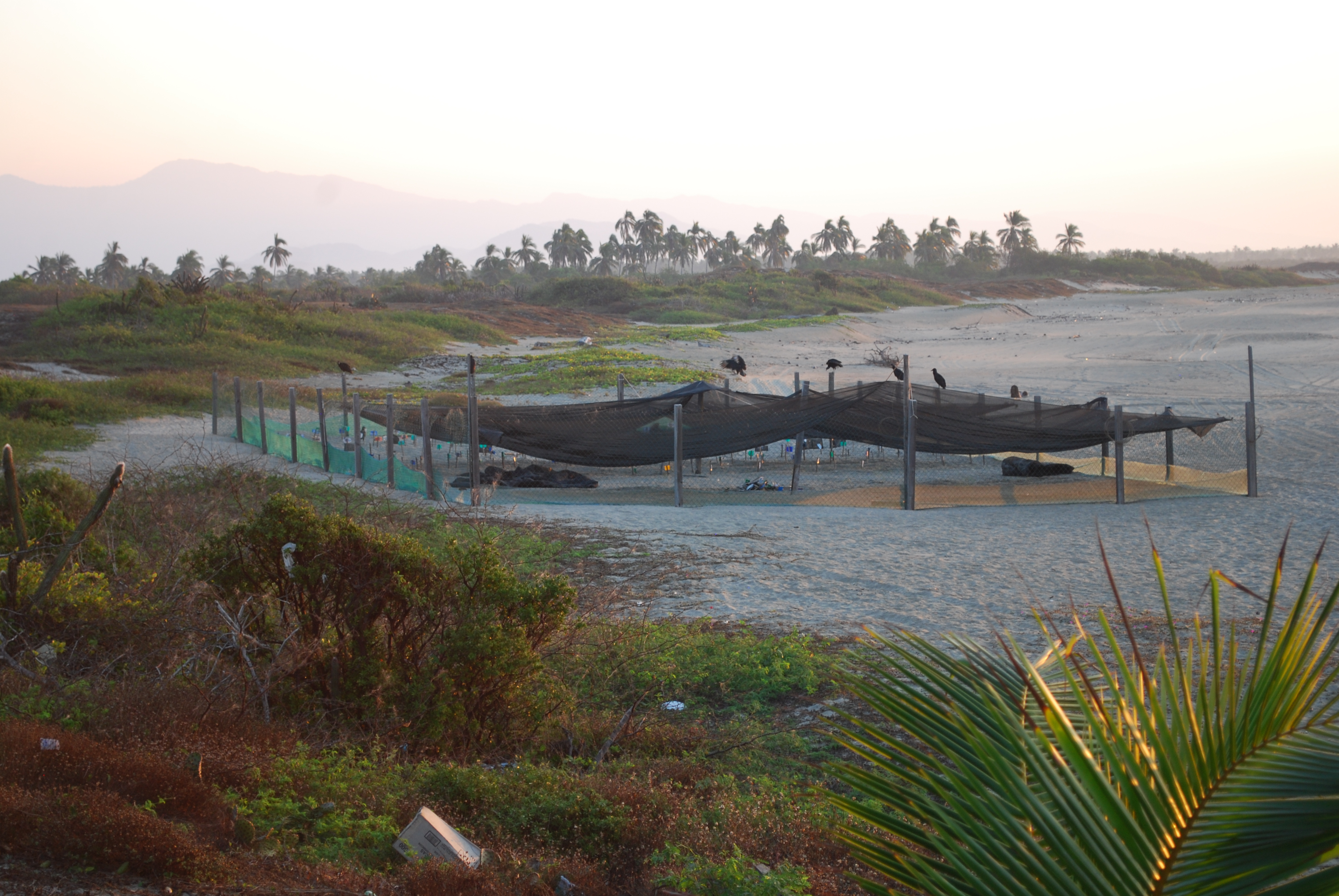
Turtle hatchery on Playa Tlalcoyunque

Most of the beaches of the Costa Grande are considered to be "semi-virgin," meaning there is no or relatively little development. Many do not have hotels but rather offer camping or simple bungalows, with restaurants in the open air under ramadas. While the hunting of sea turtles and the consumption of their eggs was legal in Mexico until recently, they are now not only banned, but many beaches along the Costa Grande have "campamentos tortugeros," or turtle breeding stations. These are areas where turtle eggs are collected after a female deposits them, then taken to a place where they are incubated safe from predators and humans, as there is still a black market for turtle eggs. Some of these stations are located in the Isla de los Pájaros and Playa Michigan, and Piedra de Tlacoyunque. Most are locally run either voluntarily or with government support. When the baby turtles hatch, volunteers release them into the nearby ocean and in many places, local schoolchildren and tourists are encouraged in participate in the release of turtles and sometimes in the collection of turtle eggs. In Tenexpa area alone, 150,000 baby turtles were released into the ocean in one year.

In the municipality of La Unión, there are a number of beaches such as Troncones, La Saladita, Petacalco, Manzanillo and Majahua, where whales and dolphins can be seen. Troncones is a growing beach area located 35 km (22 mi) northwest of Zihuatanejo, with hotels, bed and breakfasts and guesthouses, many of which are owned by Americans. The area extends for about six km along the coast. The area is known for moderate waves and has a number of establishments catering to novice surfers, including lessons. The other beaches of the municipality are mostly popular with surfers, including La Saladita, El Rancho and La Boca.

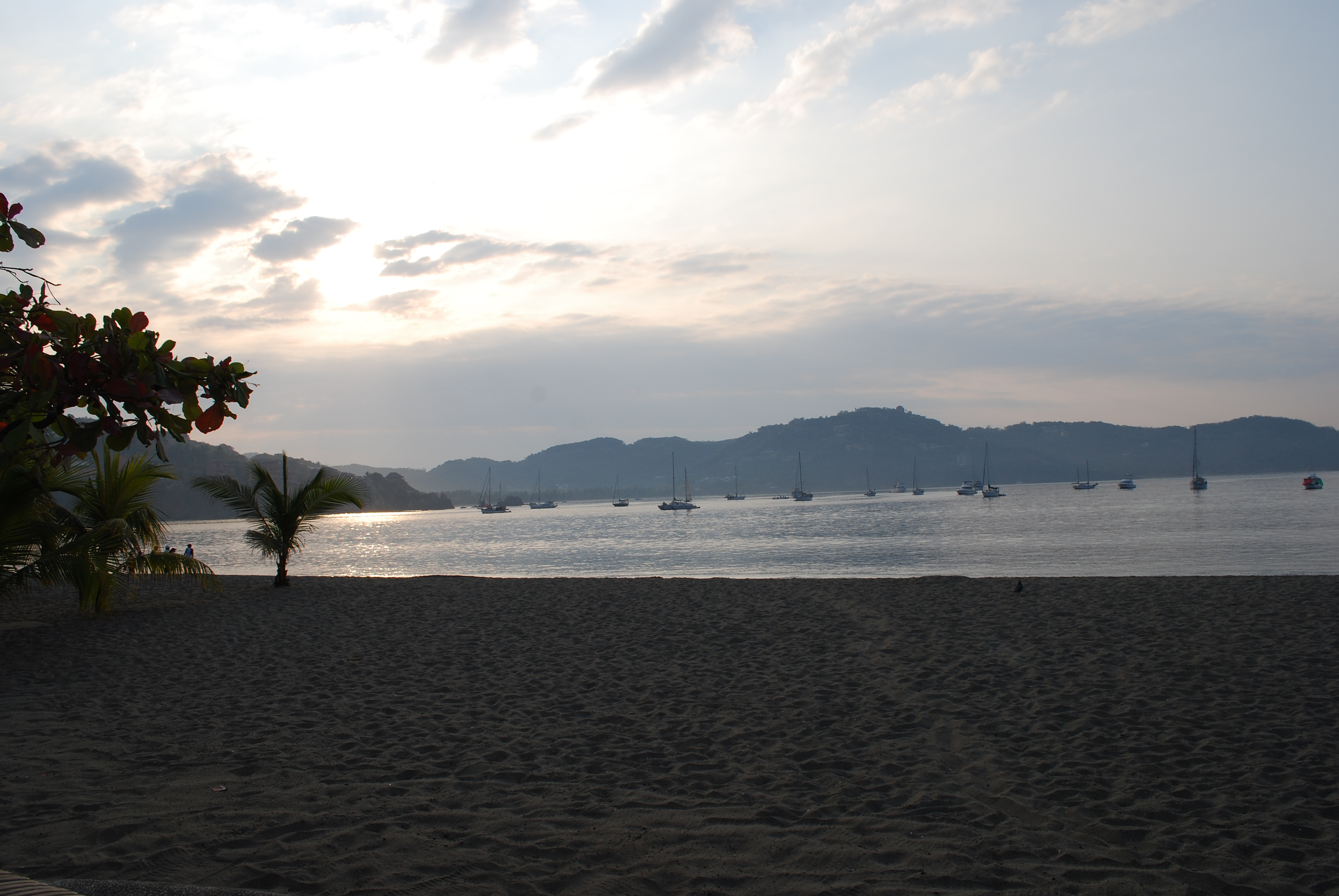
View of Zihuatanejo Bay

In the José Azueta (Zihuatanejo) municipality, the best known beaches are associated with the large town/small city of Zihuatanejo and the resort of Ixtapa. Zihuatanejo's beaches line the port's bay, which mostly shelter them from open ocean. The three largest are the Playa Principal or Playa Municipal, next to the port's docks, Playa Madera and Playa La Ropa. Playa La Ropa (literally Clothes Beach) gets its name from a cargo of silks and other textiles which washed up onto it when a ship wrecked outside the bay. At the far southeast end is Playa Las Gatas, which can only be reached by boat or by foot from Playa La Ropa, along a narrow rocky path on the edge of the bay. It has an artificial stone reef which was supposedly built by a Purépecha chief, who favored this beach as a recreational area. Ixtapa was created by FONATUR as a planned resort development between 1968 and 1971 on 4.5 km (2.8 mi) of beaches and with a marina that mostly serves yachts. Beaches include Playa Linda, Playa de Palmar on the mainland with Playa Quieta, Playa Varadera en la Isla and Playa Coral en la Isla, which are on Isla Ixtapa. There are two golf courses and a long line of luxury mega-hotels lining the beaches, with the exception of those on Isla Ixtapa.

Beach areas in the Petalan include El Calvario, with its lookout point, the Las Salinas Estuary, which is a local salt producer, Barra de Potosí, Playa La Barrita and the Valentín Beach and Estuary, noted for its oysters. With the exception of parts of the 5 km (3.1 mi) long Barra de Potosí, there is almost no development on these beaches. Most are similar to La Barrita, which has restaurants, bungalows and rooms for rent. It is one of the better places for surfing along this coast.

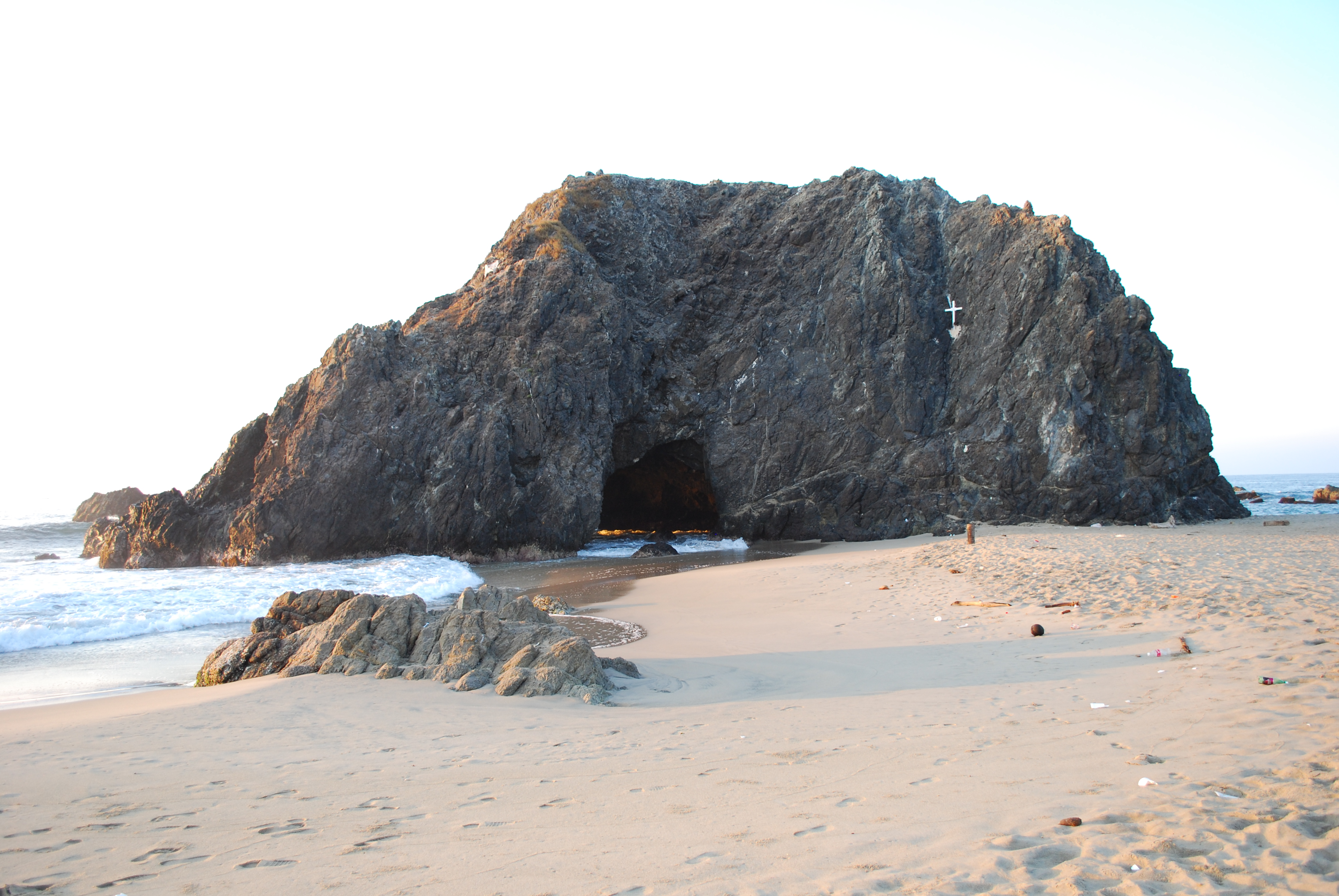
Tlalcoyunque Rock

Tecpan has seven semi virgin beaches, two lagoons and an estuary. Two of its most important beaches are Playa Michigan (reachable only by boat) and Playa La Laguna/Isla de los Pájaros, which are popular with younger travelers. The latter is a combination of a beach/estuary with a small island just offshore filled with wildlife. Playa El Carrizal and Playa Tlalcoyunque are part of the Santuario de Proteccion a la Tortuga Marina (Marine Turtle Protection Sanctuary).

San Jerónimo has three beaches: Playa San Jerónimo, Playa Paraíso Escondido and El Dorado. Another visited place is the Hacienda de Cabañas spa, which also offers camping. Playa Paraiso is reached by boat across the lagoon. Coyuca de Benitéz has a number of beaches including Espinalillo, El Carrizal and Playa Azul with host a large number of aquatic birds among tropical vegetation. Ecotourism is an attraction here, with activities such as sports fishing, canoeing, water skiing, sailing, camping, swimming and photo safaris. The Laguna de Coyuca also contains wildlife such as herons, pelicans, ducks and lizards, beach areas such as Barra de Coyuca, Los Pajaros and La Pelona only reachable by boat. The Laguna de Mitla contains mangroves and many species of birds. Just off of here is the El Embarcadero Islands, called La Montosa and La Pelona. These islands are inhabited by the descendants of a single family. The Paso Real Beach is relatively unknown, where there is a sulfur spring.

There are no lakes in the region, but there are a number of lagoons along the coast, which are separated from open ocean by a strip of land or beach. The Laguna de Potosí is located northwest of the Morro de Petatlán and is connected on the west side with Potosí Bay. The Lagunas de Mitla is situated between land and a sandy strand. It has a length of 21 km (13 mi) and a maximum width of 3 km (1.9 mi). The lagoon empties into the sea through a canal on the southeast. The Laguna de Nusco is connected to the sea via the Barra (sand bar) del Nusco on the south. The Nusco River empties into it. The Laguna de Coyuca is just west of Acapulco Bay. It extends along the coast for 10 km (6.2 mi) and has a width of over 5 km (3.1 mi). It empties into the ocean on the west side and receives fresh water from the Coyuca River. It is known for its abundance of fish. The most important lagoon ecosystems are in Coyuca, Mitla, Tenexpa, Playa Blanca and Potosí. Others include San Valentin and El Tular.

Most of the islands off the coast of Guerrero are located in this region. Isla Ixtapa (Ixtapa Island), also called Isla Grande, is located just off Ixtapa only 360 meters (1,180 feet) into the ocean. It measures 7 km (4.3 mi) from north to south and has an area of 34 km^{2} (13 sq mi). Most is still covered in shrubs and small trees. Just southeast (1.6 km or 0.99 mi) of Isla Ixtapa is Isla Apies, which has a surface area of 0.07 km^{2} (0.027 sq mi). It is undeveloped and surrounded by a beach that extends for about 3 meters (9.8 feet). The Islas Blancas are a group of six tiny islands with the names of Las Bolitas, La Concepción, La Merced, San Antonio, Placer Nuevo and the last without a name. These are found in the San Juan de Dios bay, about 2.5 km (1.6 mi) from Ixtapa. They vary in altitude from 6 to 43 meters (20 to 141 feet). The Islote (big island) de San Gabriel is also located in the same bay to the west, just off the coast. The Frailes Blancos (White Friairs), also called the Rocas de Potosí (Potosi Rocks) are a group so twelve tiny bare islands, just over 2 km (1.2 mi) from Punta Gorda facing the Petatlán Bay. The Roca Negra (Black Rock) or Roca Solitaria (Solitary Rock) is located at the entrance of Zihuatanejo Bay. It rises 14 meters (46 feet) over the sea. Isla Pájaros is located in the large lagoon of Coyuca. Also near this lagoon is another called Caballos.

== Major settlements ==
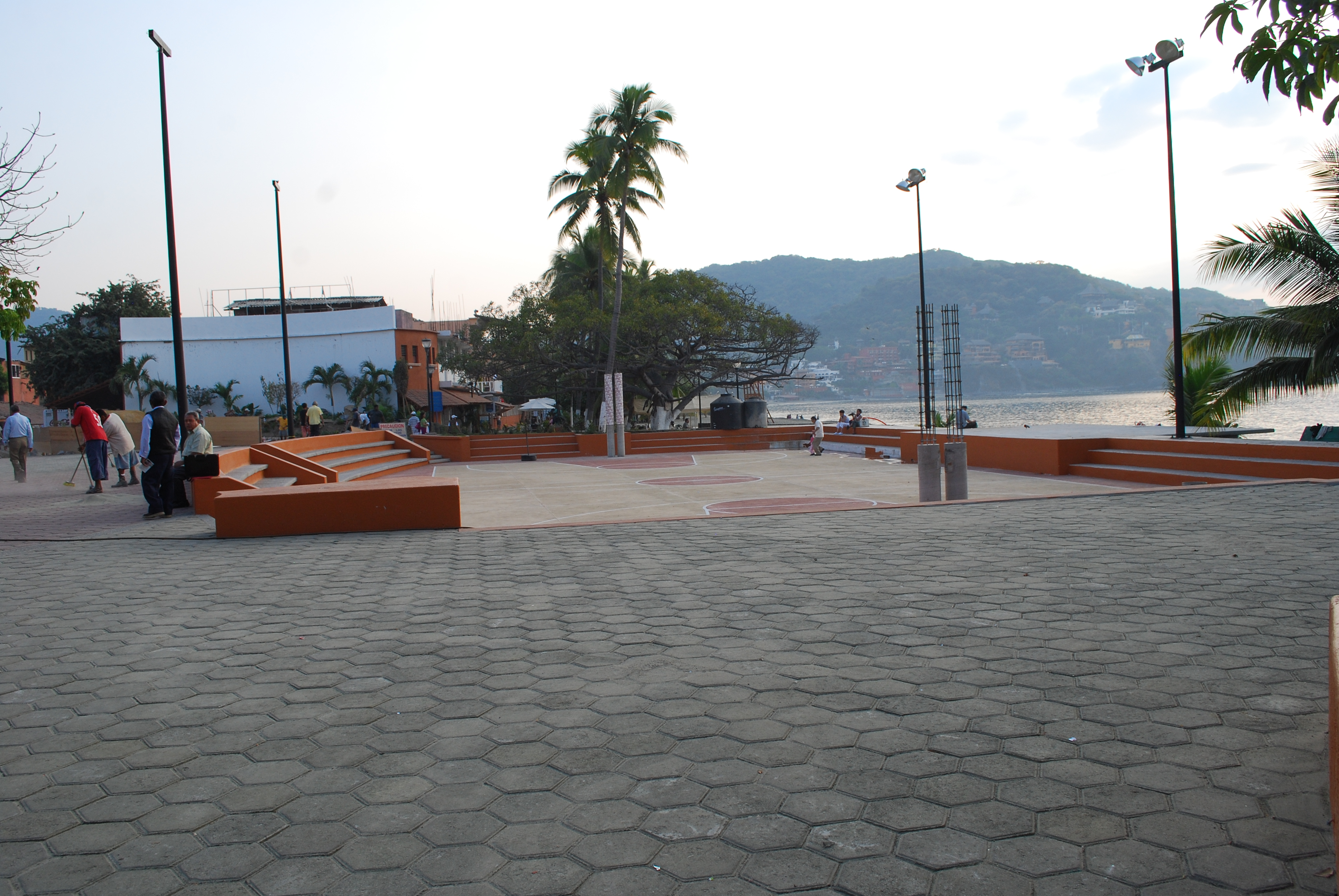
Main plaza of Zihuatanejo

The best known town/city on the Costa Grande is Zihuatanejo. It originally began as a fishing village and there is still an active fishing port and market. It was a port for a while during the colonial period, but its importance was eventually eclipsed with the establishment of Acapulco as the main Pacific port of New Spain. With the establishment of the nearby Ixtapa resort, this settlement has grown considerably. However, in comparison to Ixtapa, it is considered to have conserved most of its traditional Mexican atmosphere.

Just to the north of Zihuatanejo is the old port and shipyard of La Unión. Its original name was Zacatula, and it is the site of the first Spanish settlement on the Costa Grande in the early 16th century. However, the original settlement was destroyed by local natives. Today, it is located in a rural area which mostly makes its living through agriculture, livestock and forestry.

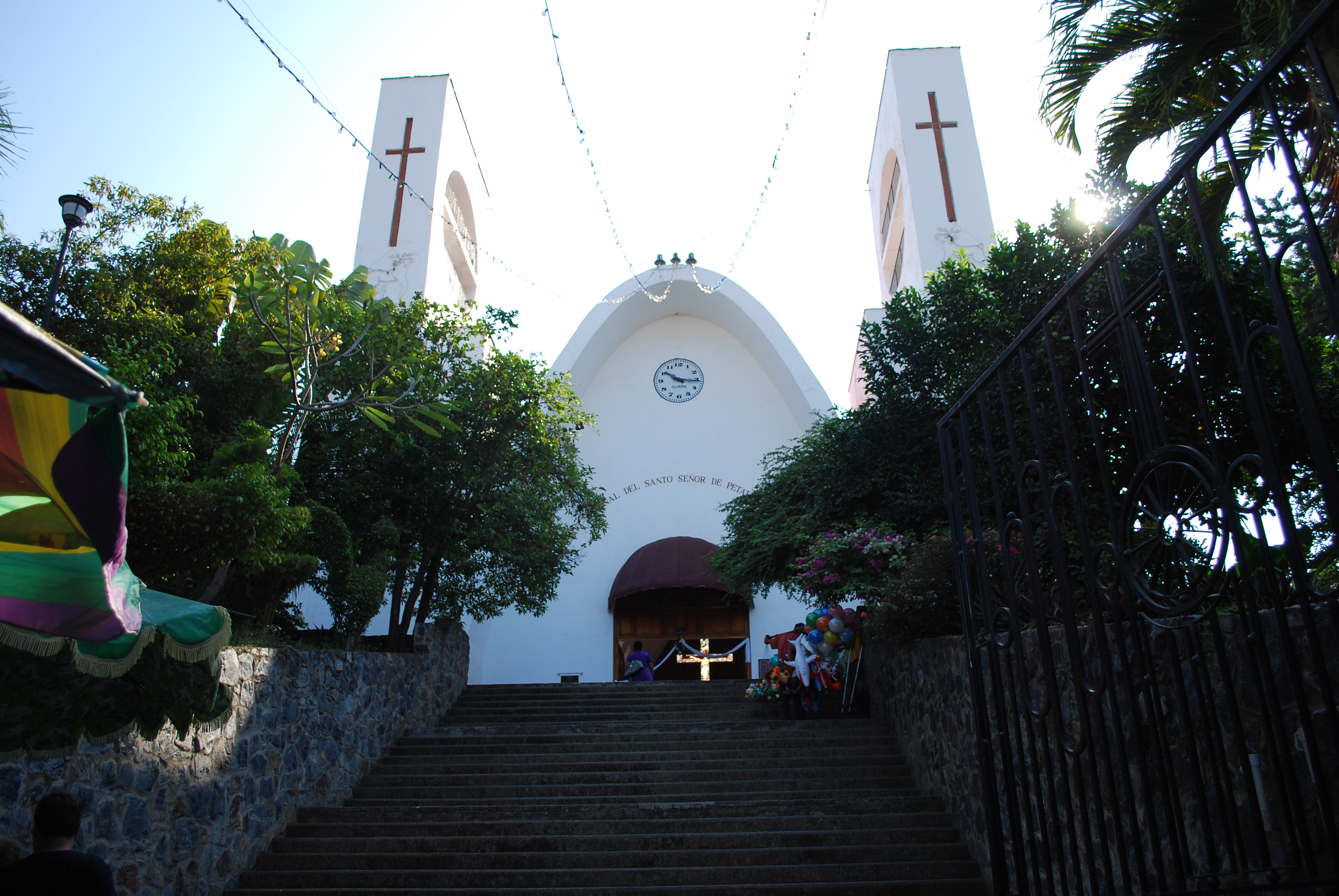
Sanctuary of the Padre Jesús de Petatlán

The city of Petatlán is located southeast of Zihuatanejo and slightly inland. It is mostly a regional commercial center. Regionally, the city is best known as the home of the Padre Jesús de Petatlán Sanctuary. It contains an image if Christ which is said to have mysteriously appeared during the colonial era and to which have been ascribed many miracles. The sanctuary is located in the center of the city, next to the traditional plaza, which contains a kiosk surrounded by gardens, a basketball court, the Casa de Cultura and the municipal palace. The city is also known for markets and stores selling gold and gold items.

Tecpan de Galeana is best known historically as the regional seat of most of the Costa Grande, and for its role in hosting insurgents during the Mexican War of Independence. The municipality was established in 1811 as a province by José María Morelos y Pavón as his army came this way to take control of the Acapulco area. Another hero of this war Hermenegildo Galeana is from this area and is honored each year by a cultural event called Expo-Tecpan held each April. Another important celebration is held in the Barrio de la Capilla neighborhood, which celebrates is patron saint Bartholomew the Apostle with floats, release of candlelit hot air balloons, fireworks, folk dances such as Panaderos and La Pluma finishing with an event called the Topa del Toro.

San Jerónimo is a small town, which until 1934 was part of the municipality of Tecpan. Today, it is the seat of a municipality which is officially called Benito Juárez (after the Mexican president) but is commonly referred to as San Jerónimo. It is the commercial center of an agricultural area growing mangos, bananas, and other crops.

Coyuca de Benitéz is at the east end of the Costa Grande, near Acapulco. It is a fairly large city, which historically was known as a stronghold for insurgents during the Mexican War of Independence. Today, its economy is based on being a commercial center for the area west of Acapulco, and it attracts a number of tourists as well.

== Archeology ==
Unlike the central highlands of Mexico, relatively little archeological work has been done in the Costa Grande area. However, recent digs have indicated that the region may have been more important in the past than previously thought. Human habitation has been dated in the area since at least 2000 B.C.E. Nearly 6,000 ceramic fragments 1,400 years old with Teotihuacan influence have been found in various sites along the Costa Grande. This find shows that the local Tepozteca, Cuitlateca and Tomil cultures had contact with larger interior cultures as well as closer cultures such as the Mezcala in the center and north of Guerrero. Most of the artifacts have been found in the Coyuca de Benítez Municipality as well as the Soledad de Maciel site in Petatlán and Tambuco in Acapulco. Many of the pieces were not imported from Teotihuacan, but are local products with Teotihuacan designs.

The largest site excavated so far is La Soledad de Maciel. The excavated site was likely a ceremonial center which was used by various cultures including the Tomiles, the Cuitatecos and the Tepoztecas during its history. There are surrounding deposits, so the site could extend as much as ten km2, from the Huamilule Hill to the community of Cabritero and the Chiquito River. According to the finds, the site had been occupied for more than 3,000 years and had contact with a number of other Mesoamerican cultures. Explored areas include Mound A, Mound B and the Cerro de los Brujos. Mound A was the ball court. This court measures 160 meters long and 29 meters wide. There is yet another section to be excavated, which may make it the largest Mesoamerican ball court. Mound B measures one hectare and is 15 meters high. It was topped with five temples surrounding a sunken patio. The Cerro de los Brujos has various petroglyphs, a circular stone with appears to have been used for sacrifices and four pyramidal bases. One unique aspect to the site is that its pyramids are constructed with river stone and adobe, not common in Mexican archeology.

Like many others in Guerrero, archeological sites along the Costa Grande do not have security due to the lack of resources. Many of the sites suffer from sacking by the local populations who sell items they find. Many of these items eventually find their way abroad. One serious example of this is a site in San Jerónimo, where local sacked a zone which contains stele.

== History ==
=== Pre-Hispanic period ===
The first human occupants of the region were nomadic tribes with a hunting and gathering culture. Before the Mexican colonial period, the area had always been sparsely populated, with widely dispersed settlements. Little is known of the early cultures of the area, but archeological sites in the area show settled human presence since at least 2000 B.C.E, and ceramic pieces and other finds have shown that the inhabitants had contact with both the Olmecs and Toltecs by the 8th century. It is not known if this contact was direct, or via the Mezcala culture, which was centered further inland. In Atoyac municipality, there are a number of archeological remains corresponding to the Mezcala culture, which developed between the 5th and 7th centuries.

By the 11th century, Petatlán was inhabited by the Cuitlatecos, the Chumbias and the Pantecas. Many of these inhabitants migrated from the north, through Zacatula. The original settlement of Tecpan is thought to have been founded in 1326 by a Nahua tribe which migrated from the north. However, in the 14th century, much of the area, along with another Guerrero region called Tierra Caliente, came under the control of the Cuitlatecos, with their most important settlement being Mezcaltepec near Atoyac de Álvarez. The Tolimecas were another culture that existed in the area. The two largest settlements of this dominion were Cuitlatepan, near Zihuatanejo, and Petatlán. In the 15th century, both the rising Aztec Empire and Purépecha Empire were putting pressure onto the Cuitlateco dominion, which eventually brought it to an end. The Purépecha held some areas of the Costa Grande, including Zihuatanejo Bay, which was used as a kind of retreat on what is now Playa Las Gatas. The Aztecs took Cuitlatepan in 1497 and much of the rest of the Costa Grande by 1504, renaming Cuitlaetepan to Cihuatlán, and forming a tributary province which roughly coincides with the Costa Grande today. The Aztec conquest caused much of the population to flee and abandon the cities of Petatlán and Cihuatlán. For this reason, little remains of them today. Aztec control of the area was loose and some small areas still remained allied with the Purépecha.

=== Colonial period ===
Initial Spanish interest in the Guerrero area revolved around the search for more gold, and to establish a route between Mexico and Asia. After the Spanish conquest of the Aztec Empire, Hernán Cortés sent expeditions to Zacatula under Gonzalo de Ungiría and Juan Alvarez Chico. In 1523, Juan Rodríguez de Villafuerte and Simon de Cuenca took over Cihuatlán and almost all of the Costa Grande. He destroyed the indigenous settlement of Zacatula, which was located on the Balsas River, and founded in its place the Villa de la Concepción, with a fortified shipyard and port he named Puerto Santiago. This was the eighth Spanish municipality established in Mexico and the first on the Pacific Coast. The settlement was established with 122 Spaniards, and a two brigantines, but it was attacked and destroyed by local natives in the latter half of the century. A new shipyard and port was constructed at Zihuatanejo. The Spanish used the bay as a point of departure to explore the Pacific coast as well as a port for the first ships to sail to the Philippines, named the Florida, the Espiritu Santo and the Santiago. These ships were ordered built by Hernán Cortés and offered to the Spanish king Carlos V. They left Zihuatanejo Bay on 31 October 1527, with Captain Alvaro de Saavedra y Cerón. Only the Florida made it to the Asian islands, and neither the captain nor crew ever returned to Mexico. Zihuatenejo would be replaced by the port of Acapulco, which has the most sheltered bay on the Pacific Coast. From this point on, ports on the Costa Grande would only be used for the shipping of local agricultural products to markets, and occasionally as hideouts by Dutch and English pirates, such as Sir Francis Drake and William Dampier, who attacked the galleons leaving from and arriving to Acapulco.

For the most part, the Spanish takeover of the Costa Grande did not meet with resistance after news arrived about the fall of Tenochtitlan, but much of the already sparse population disappeared and it is not known where many of them went. Local dialects in most areas have been lost. In a number of areas, Spanish evangelizers worked to group remaining dispersed indigenous populations. Frair Juan Bautista Moya and Pedro de Gerovillas, regrouped the natives in the Tecpan area to refound the old pre-Hispanic settlement in 1538. Atoyac was founded as a religious congregation called Santa María de Concepción Atoyac in 1541, as was Petatlán in 1550.

Spanish interest in Guerrero during the colonial period was mostly focused on the gold and other minerals coming out of Taxco and the Asian trade centered on Acapulco. Third in line was the production of various cash crops such as cotton, cacao and coconuts, much of which was grown on the coast. These were produced on large encomiendas and haciendas, which exploited the local indigenous and later mestizo populations. As part of the Conquest, most of the lands of the Costa Grande were divided among conquistadors into "encomiendas," which used and overworked indigenous labor. This caused a severe drop in the already sparse native population. This led to the importation of African slaves in a few areas of the Costa Grande closest to Acapulco, but the practice was wider spread in the Costa Chica. In other parts, fields and forests were worked by Spaniards due to the utter lack of native peoples, leaving little in the way of the colonial system what was prevalent in other parts of Mexico. The main early export was tropical woods such as cedar, oak, walnut and others. Much of this was exported to Europe. The Spanish galleons of Manila brought coconut trees to the area, which became the basis of the economy of the coast for some time. Few, if any, vestiges of the haciendas of the area remain, mostly because lasting constructions such as stone mansions or aqueducts were ever built, as they were in other parts of Mexico.

The Spanish co-opted the indigenous "cacique" or local strongman leadership at the beginning of the colonial period, with only a few areas in all of Guerrero, such as Acapulco, having European style governance from the beginning. Encomienda holders made arrangements with these leaders to control the population and force them to work. Eventually, caciques became Spanish (criollo) and more locally mestizos, who rose to their position through their economic power and/or political/social connections. Major encomienda holders included Juan Rodriguez de Villafuerte, Isidro Moreno, Ginés de Pinzón and Anton Sanchez. Encomiendas eventually gave way to the hacienda system, but these were controlled by cacique families such as the Galeana family in Tecpan. For the most part, the haciendas and caciques reduced most of the population to near servitude.

=== Mexican War of Independence to the present ===
The abuses of the hacienda system and the caciques made the area ripe for the insurgent movement under Miguel Hidalgo y Costilla. In 1810, José María Morelos y Pavón passed through the Costa Grande from Michoacán in order to take Acapulco, having little trouble recruiting soldiers. However, many hacienda owners were also recruited, especially in Tecpan and Coyuca, mostly due to strong nationalist and anti-Spanish sentiment among criollos in the area. For the most part, the Costa Grande would remain in insurgent hands, with a major insurgent headquarters in Tecpan, which was a province created by Morelos himself in 1811.

During and after the Independence, the Costa Grande initially became part of the Capitania General del Sur, but then the area became part of the states of Michoacán and Mexico. It would remain such until the creation of the state of Guerrero in 1849. After the end of the reign of Agustín de Iturbide, the process of dividing the Costa Grande into municipalities began with Tecpan in 1824. which was far larger than it is today. The rest were created between then and 1953 the last being José Azueta (Zihuatanejo) by separating territories from Tecpan, and then by dividing these. Some municipal seats, such as Coyuca, Petatlán and Zihuatanejo would achieve city status over time. Despite the imposition of the municipality system by liberal elements of the Mexican government, real political and economic power remained uninterrupted in the hand of cacique families, a number of whom are still honored for their roles in the War of Independence. After independence, the most powerful cacique was Juan Álvarez, who would keep economic, political and military power concentrated in this family and those affiliated with it. Independence and the liberal reforms of the 19th century would have little to no effect on the daily lives of the vast majority of people in the Costa Grande.

During the Porfirio Díaz era in the late 19th and early 20th centuries, the cacique system again co-opted, in this case with the federal government selling lands very cheaply to foreign interests and contracting with caciques to provide labor. In the Costa Grande area, much of the land came under the control of a family named Miller. Intensive agriculture based on cash crops such as cotton, coconuts, coffee and citrus fruit were introduced. Many workers became indentured servants, a situation which would continue until the Mexican Revolution.

During this war, the area was mostly sympathetic the Liberation Army of the South as was the rest of Guerrero; however, fighting was mostly done in the state's central valleys. The major effect of the war was the redistribution of land and the institution of the ejido system afterwards, with the aim of giving "campesinos" (peasant farmers) lands that could not be taken away from them. However, their formation did not do away with the old caciques, which still exerted considerable influence. One example of this was Silvestre Mariscal, who controlled the municipality of Atoyac starting in 1914.

For the rest of the 20th century to the present, the history of the area has been dominated by the struggles of campesinos against local and regional caciques, along with national and international interests which have worked with caciques for their own ends. Early efforts, to strengthen campesino rights included a league established in 1925, in Atoyac by Amadeo Vidales. In the 1930s, the ejido system gained the support of the presidency of Lázaro Cárdenas, and it was strengthened with thirty six created in the municipality of Atoyac alone. However, large estates still remained such as the lands belonging to the Guerrero Land and Timber Co. which included parts of La Unión, Petatlán, Tecpan, Atoyac, as well as Ajuchitlán, Coyuca de Catlán and even Chilpancingo in the interior. This left large parts of the Costa Grande still under the control of a few landholders. Labor movements in general were active from the 1930s to the 1950s, culminating is a strike by workers on coconut plantations from Acapulco to Zihuatanejo in 1952, which blocked roads. In the 1990s, guerrillas of the EZLN based in Chiapas gained footing in the Costa Grande, especially in the municipalities close to Acapulco such as Coyuca. These fought police and military forces for a number of years during this decade along with local groups such as the Comando Armado Revolucionario del Sur (CARS). This fighting lead to the militarization of many of the roads in the Costa Grande, including Highway 200. This fighting also coincided with the political struggles between the PRD party and the then-ruling PRI. Another struggle has been between local farmers and logging interests, especially in Petatlán. In the 1990s, arrangements with national and local leaders to log forests located on ejido land in the area. The logging quickly began to exceed legal limits and began seriously damaging the ecology of the area, such as causing rivers and streams like the Coyuquilla River to dry up. Local farmers depend on these resources and in the late 1990s, banded together to form the Campesino Environmentalist Organization of Petatlan and Coyuca de Catalan (OCEP). The group is best known for blocking logging roads, which had an effect on the industry. In 1998, two of the movement's leaders, Rodolfo Montiel and Teodoro Cabrerea and made to confess to charges leveled against them by the federal government. With the support of Amnesty International, Greenpeace and others, the two were released in 2001. Since then, there has been continued sporadic violence, including killings, leading to human rights condemnations. Another activist, Felipe Arriaga Sanchez, was detained on charges of murder and criminal association in 2004. Amnesty International believes that it is politically motivated. The OCEP continues to exist and fight deforestation mostly through legal channels, although some are still accused by authorities of drug trafficking and membership in a guerrilla group. The group states the charges come from local caciques when the group pushes for new legal actions. The group has had more success in the Petatlan Valley than in Coyuquilla Valley, but in both areas there continues to be large scale illegal cutting, with cleared areas then being used for pasture or to grow drugs. The environment destruction forces many local farmers to become part of the drug production in order to survive.

In addition to this violence, efforts to curb the drug trade in Mexico have had serious effects on the area. Since 2005, the Costa Grande has been dominated by drug related violence according to the Procuraduría General de la República and state authorities. Incidents have included kidnappings and executions; including those of police and local political figures as local criminal organizations ally themselves with rival Sinaloa and Gulf cartels fighting for dominance in the region. Petatlán has been especially hard hit by the violence. Federal Highway 200 between Acapulco and Zihuatanejo remains militarized, with soldiers manning checkpoints along the stretch looking for guns and weapons. These checkpoints randomly search private and commercial vehicles, including tour busses.

In the 1930s and 1940s, the development of Acapulco as a resort began the Guerrero's coast tourism economy, bringing it an international reputation as well as major infrastructure such as the highway linking the Costa Grande with Mexico City via Highway 200. On the Costa Grande proper, the government developed the beach area of Ixtapa, near Zihuatanejo in the 1970s. The two are promoted together, but with two very different atmospheres. Ixtapa is promoted as a world class luxury resort and Zihuatanejo is promoted as a more "typical" Mexican experience. The rest of the coast has only spotty tourism development, with the next most developed area being Troncones, with its bed and breakfasts and bungalows.

== Economy ==
=== Agriculture, other food products and forestry ===
The area is fertile, with agriculture and livestock dominating the economy in most areas. One major crop is coffee, which is grown over about 30,000 hectares (74,000 acres) in the municipalities of Atoyac, Coyuca and Tecpan just to the northwest of Acapulco. Most coffee is grown in small plantations of under 5 hectares (12 acres) on ejidos or communal lands. The sale of this coffee constitutes most of these ejido members' income. However, most of these coffee farms have old coffee plants and little maintenance, leading to low yields. Most of the coffee production of the coast and the state is in Atoyac, and the processing of it is the major industry. The state delegation of Inmacafé, the federal authority overseeing coffee production and promotion is located here.

Coconut palms were introduced to the area during the colonial period from the Philippines. For some time after that, they were the major cash crop. Coconut plantations still dominate the landscape along almost all of the coast, and the drying of coconut kernels (copra) is one of few widespread industries in the area. Other crops that are raised in the area include corn, tropical fruit, sesame seed, citrus fruit, melons, tamarind and hibiscus flowers, with rice and sugar cane grown in Tecpan. Livestock raising is dominated by meat and dairy cattle, although the production of honey is a traditional product as well. There is a beehive construction industry in Atoyac.

The area is an important source of forestry products, with most forested lands controlled by ejidos and some under private ownership. Most harvested trees are pines, holm oak and oyamel. Tropical woods are harvested in La Unión and Coyuca. In Coyuca, Tecpan and Petatlán logging is officially supervised by a public cooperative with the name of Vicente Guerrero.

The Costa Grande along with the rest of the Guerrero coast is important nationally as a source of seafood. Major fishing communities exist in Petacalco and Zihuatanejo. Exploited species include shark, sailfish, huachinango, sea bass, mojarra, octopus, shrimp, lobster, clams and crabs. Other large fishing areas include Barra Potosí, Playa Azul, El Carrizal, la Barrita, La Laguna, El Camalote and El Embarcadero in Coyuca and along the shoreline in Petatlan. Zihuatanejo has a major fishing port and fish market. It is also an important port for sports fishing. Shrimp fishing and raising is important in the Atoyac municipality, especially in the areas of Mexcaltepec, Agua Fria and Junda de los Rios.

Industry in the area is limited. The most widely distributed industry is food production and the production of ice, most of which is for local markets. Coffee and coconut kernels are processing for wider distribution. There is furniture making in Coyuca and Tecpan, a soap factory in San Jeronimito, Petatlán and a livestock feed production facility in Tecpan. Most commerce and services in the municipalities are geared to local needs, with some hotels and restaurants for tourists along beach areas.

=== Tourism ===
The major tourism center for the area (not counting Acapulco) is the twin developed attractions of Ixtapa and Zihuatanejo. In recent years, Troncones has been growing and has become better known. Since the mid 20th century, Acapulco and later Ixtapa/Zihuatanejo, have been traditional beaches for vacationers from Mexico. Troncones and beaches near it attract surfers, backpackers and others attracted to its more laid-back atmosphere. Less developed beach areas such as Barra Potosí and Playa Michigan are popular among young travelers. There is also a fair amount of tourist infrastructure in the municipality of Coyuca, but most of the rest of the beaches of the Costa Grande have only open air restaurants and one or two places to stay. Some do not have even that, and are almost completely empty.

Starting in 2008, the state government began to create artificial reefs off the coast using blocks of cement, with the idea of creating attractions for sport divers and in some cases help the local environment by promoting greater biodiversity. The first blocks were placed in the port of Acapulco. As of March 2010, more than 300 modules had been placed in various parts of the Costa Chica with artificial reefs planned for various areas of the Costa Grande including Petacalco, Ixtapa, Zihuatanejo, Playa Ventura and Puerto Vicente Guerrero.

In addition to La Soledad de Maciel, there are archeological remains scattered in various parts of the coast. Zihuatanejo has a museum dedicated to the archeology of the region.

== See also ==
- Mezcala culture

== Bibliography ==
- Bartra, Armando (2000). Guerrero bronco: Campesinos, ciudadanos y guerrilleros en la Costa Grande [Wild Guerrero:Peasant farmers, citizens and guerilla fighters in the Costa Grande] (in Spanish). Mexico City: Ediciones Era, SA de CV. ISBN 978-968-411-487-6.
