= Xihuacan =

Archaeological Site in Guerrero, Mexico

La Soledad de Maciel archaeological site
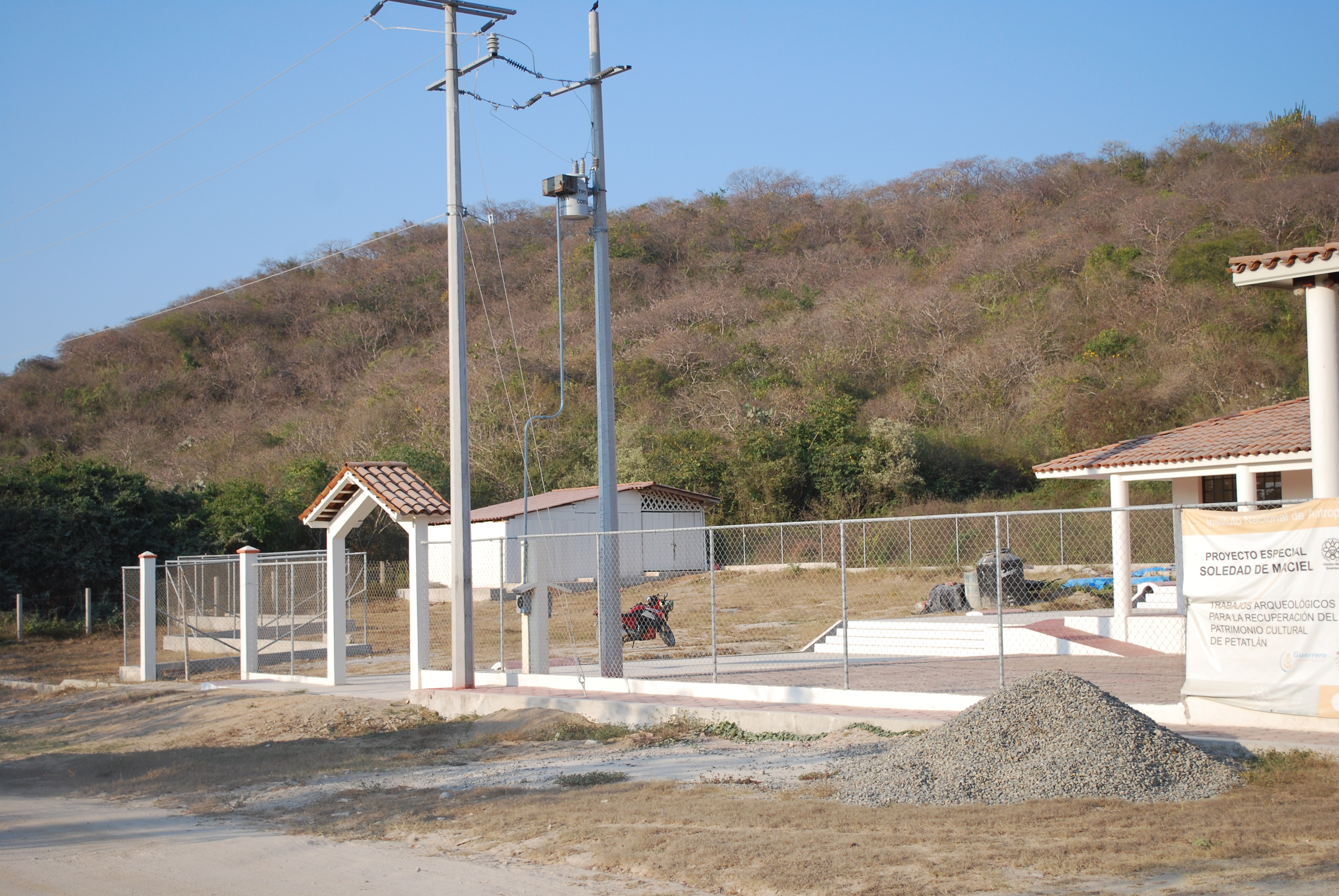
- Site museum
- Interactive map of La Soledad de Maciel archaeological site
- 17°31′00″N 101°19′00″W
- Type: Archeology
- Location: La Soledad de Maciel, Mexico

History
- Built: 800 BC
- Abandoned: 1350 AD

Xihuacan is a Mesoamerican archeological site located on the Costa Grande of the Mexican state of Guerrero, near the small town of La Soledad de Maciel, and the larger towns of Zihuatanejo and Petatlán. While pieces had been found at the site earlier, including the King of La Chole stele and Mesoamerican ball court rings, formal excavations were only recently begun. The site had been occupied for over 3,000 years and by three cultures, with contact with other Mesoamerican cultures such as the Teotihuacan and Olmec. Explored areas include what may be the largest Mesoamerican ball court, a 1-hectare (2.5-acre) pyramidal base and a hill with petroglyphs and a probable sacrifice stone.

According to residents, pieces had been found in the area since the 1930s, including some of the most important but formal excavations were begun only in the late part of the first decade of the 2000s, when authorities began to acquire lands for the archeologic exploration. One of these pieces is a stele discovered in 1944 called the King of La Chole, who was a venerated figure. Today, this piece is at the local church. The feet of the stele were in a private home but were returned to the site for its new museum. The rings of the ball court were taken to the city of Petatlán, along with a circular stone representing the goddess of the Earth, Tlaltecutli but have now been returned to the museum at the site. The stele, however, will remain at the local church.

The site is located in the municipality of Petatlán, in the small village of La Soledad de Maciel. This village is located four kilometers (2.5 mi) south of Highway 200 at the end of a dirt road. The village has a population of about 400 inhabitants with just under eighty houses. The residents subsist on agriculture, growing corn, beans, vegetables and coconuts, supplemented by some cattle and fishing along the local shore. The area is also known for the cultivation of tobacco and the making of handcrafted cigars. The excavation of the site and construction of a museum was built from 2007 to 2010 at a cost of 12 million pesos, not only to study and preserve the site but also to provide tourist attraction to an area with limited economic possibilities. According to the Instituto Nacional de Antropología e Historia the ruins could be as important as Teotihuacan or Chichén Itza as they span from the pre Classic to post Classic periods in Mesoamerican chronology. It is the largest ceremonial center and largest archeological site in the state. The site coincides with the ancient city of Xihuacan, which flourished between 200 and 800 C.E. It was the largest population center between Acapulco and Zacatula at its height. Pieces of ornamental work made with shells and copper indicate that this was begun here earlier than in Michoacán.

The excavated site is likely a ceremonial center which was used by various cultures over the course of its history, including the Tolimecs, the Cuitlatecs and the Tepuztecs. There are surrounding settlements, so the site could extend as much as ten square kilometers (3.9 sq mi), from the Huamilule Hill to the community of Cabritero and the Chiquito River. According to the finds, the site had been occupied for more than 3,000 years and had contact with a number of other Mesoamerican cultures. Find of ceramics and other objects at this site and other nearby sites indicate that the cultures had economic and cultural contact with Teotihuacan. The site contains one idol which measures 1.5 meters tall and appears to be from the Olmec period.

Explored areas include Mound A, Mound B and the Cerro de los Brujos. Mound A was the ball court. This court measures 160 meters (520 ft) long and 29 meters (95 ft) wide. There is yet another section to be excavated, which may make it the largest Mesoamerican ball court. Excavation of the court found various deposits of human sacrifice and ceramics in the shape of jaguars. It also included a glyph, which is believed to relate to the original name of the city. Mound B measures 1 hectare (2.5 acres) and is 15 meters (49 ft) high. It was topped with five temples surrounding a sunken patio. The Cerro de los Brujos has various petroglyphs, a circular stone with appears to have been used for sacrifices and four pyramidal bases. One unique aspect to the site is that its pyramids are constructed with river stone and adobe, not common in Mexican archeology.
