= Tepuztec people =

Extinct Indigenous people of Mexico

The Tepuztec (also spelled Tepoztec), also known as the Tlacotepehua, were an indigenous people of Mexico. In the 16th century, they lived in the Sierra Madre del Sur and Costa Grande regions of what is now the state of Guerrero. Tepuztec towns included Otatlan and Tlacotepec, as well as the now extinct or renamed towns of Citlaltomagua, Anecuilco and Xahualtepec. Along the Costa Grande, they lived interspersed with the Cuitlatec people. Their population on the eve of Spanish contact (c. 1520) has been estimated at roughly 32,000, representing 4% of the population of Guerrero at the time. The Tepuztec no longer exist as an identifiable group, their language having gone extinct some time after the 16th century.

The name Tepuztec derives from the Nahuatl word tepoztli, meaning "copper" or "workable metal"; the name refers to the metal artworks produced by this culture. The Tepuztec language is extinct and unclassified, no document describing it having been found. Donald Brand speculated that it was related to Cuitlatec given that both peoples originated on the Costa Grande. Nahuatl was also widely used as a lingua franca in the region.

Little is known about their religion. They worshipped a god named Andut and a goddess named Macuili Achiotl (Nahuatl for "Five Annatto"). They were said to worship trees, rocks and animals and practice bloodletting rites on mountaintops. At least one archaeological site, dating to the postclassic period and including walls and graves full of artifacts, has been attributed to the Tepuztec culture, while the site of Soledad de Maciel was also partially inhabited by Tepuztecs. As the Purépecha and Aztec empires expanded, they both came into contact with the Tepuztec territory, the Purépecha occasionally raiding it and the Aztecs establishing some garrisons.
