= Cuicatec =

Cuicatec may refer to:

- Cuicatecs, an ethnic group of Oaxaca, Mexico
- Cuicatec language, the Oto-Manguean language spoken by them

== See also ==
- Cuitlatec people, a historic ethnic group of Guerrero, Mexico
- Cuitlatec language, the extinct language isolate formerly spoken by them
