= Petatlán =

City in the Mexican state of Guerrero

- City
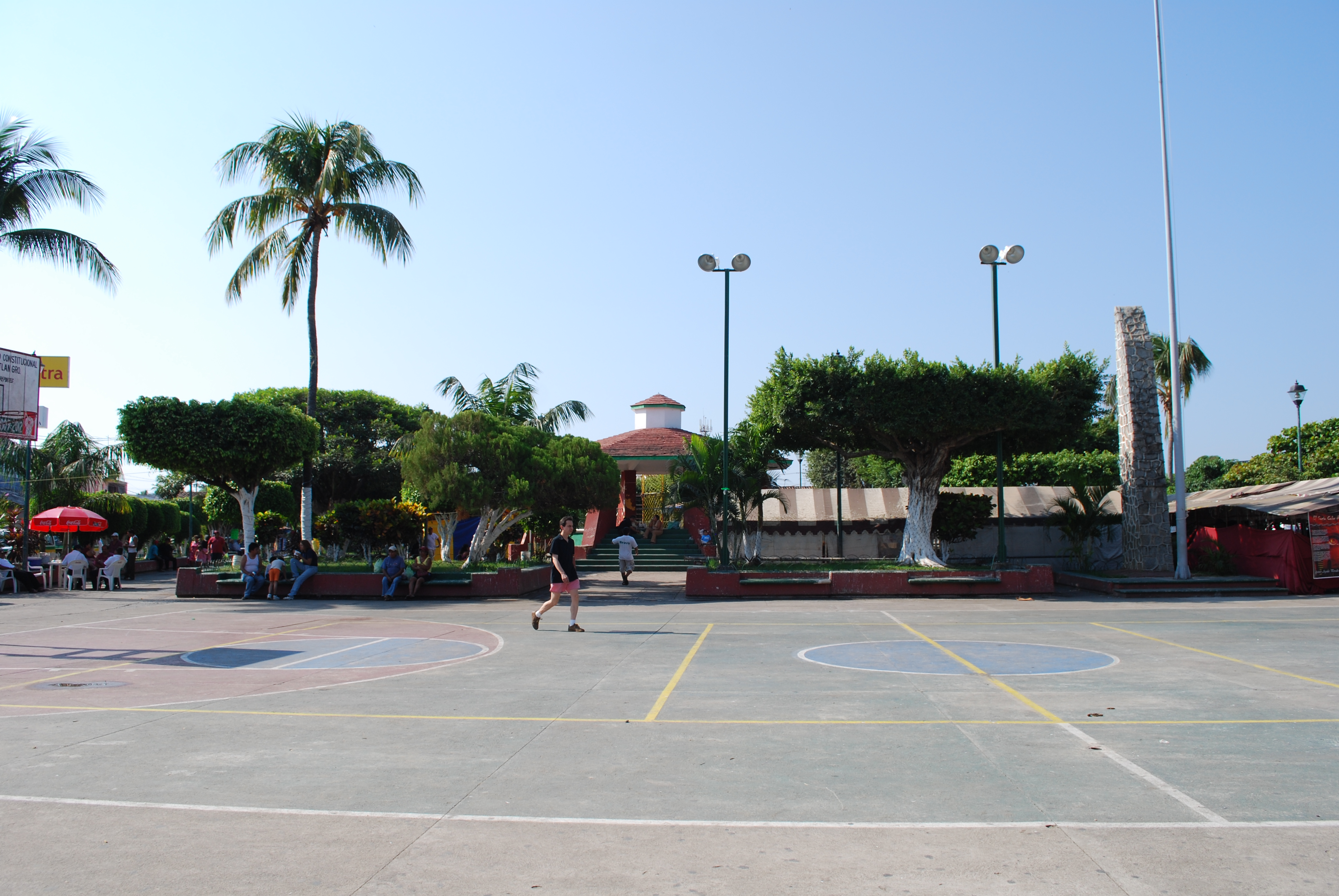
- Basketball court and kiosk in city center

- Location in Mexico Petatlán (Mexico)
- Coordinates: 17°32′18″N 101°16′26″W
- Country: Mexico
- State: Guerrero
- Municipality: Petatlán
- Founded: 1550
- Municipal Status: 1870

Government
  - Municipal President: Albino Lacunza Santos

Area
  - Total: 2,071.7 km^{2} (799.9 sq mi)
- Elevation (of seat): 57 m (187 ft)

Population (2005) Municipality
  - Total: 44,485
  - Seat: 20,720
- Time zone: UTC-6 (Zona Centro)
- Postal code (of seat): 40850

Petatlán is a city in the municipality of Petatlán located along the Pacific Coast of the Mexican state of Guerrero. It is part of the Costa Grande region between Zihuatanejo and Acapulco. The city is known for the Sanctuary of the Padre Jesús de Petatlán, a 17th-century image of Christ that is claimed to have performed religious miracles. The city is the seat of a large municipality, which faces the Pacific Ocean to the south and is bounded by the Sierra Madre del Sur to the north. It contains the La Soledad de Maciel archeological site. The area's recent history has been marked by violence related to the drug trade and to struggles between business and local farmers and environmental groups. St. Peter, Minnesota is a sister city of Petatlán.

== The city ==
The city is located just off Federal Highway 200 east of the tourist attraction of Zihuatanejo. It has a population of about 21,000 people (2005). The center of the city has a traditional plaza which is surrounded by gardens and a basketball court. Around this plaza area are the Casa de Cultura (cultural center) and the municipal palace. It is known for markets and stores selling gold and gold items. A local dish is tamales with goat meat wrapped in banana leaves.

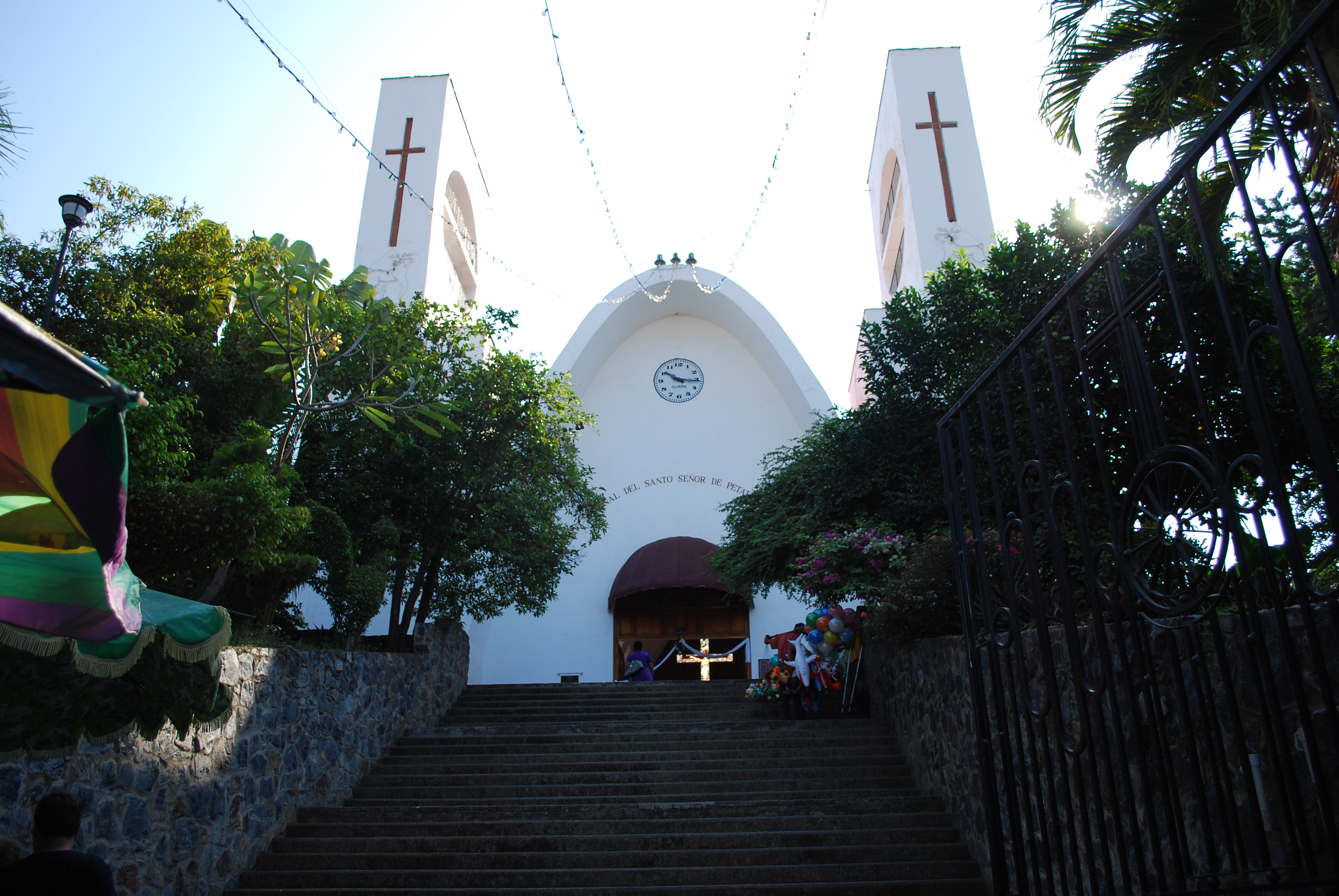
Sanctuary of the Padre Jesús de Petatlán

The city is best known as the home of the Padre Jesús de Petatlán Sanctuary. The image is of Christ during one of the times he fell while carrying the Cross. The image dates to the 17th century. This image has been accredited with many miracles, with devotees referring to it as “Tata Chuy” or “Papa Chuy.” (Tata means grandfather, and Papa means dad. Chuy is a common diminutive for Jesús.) The image is housed in a large white church with very large wooden doors, whose official name is Santuario Nacional del Santo Señor de Petatlán. Just outside the atrium, vendors selling gold and religious items congregate. It is a regional pilgrimage site, which is particularly visited during Holy Week, when as many as 30,000 people come into the city. During this week, the city holds a fair, called Fexpo, but the highlight of the week is a Passion Play in which 60 area residents are chosen to play Jesus and the other principal characters. The Play begins at the sanctuary, and then proceeds along a five-kilometer path, reenacting the Stations of the Cross, on the way to a hill in the Colonia Benito Juarez neighborhood, which simulates Calvary. However, in 2006, there was a grenade attack during the Fexpo in which two people were killed and about 50 wounded; since then, the crowds during Holy Week and the rest of the year have been much smaller.

== History ==
The name derives from two Nahuatl words "petatl" (straw mat) and "tlan" (next to), meaning "next to the straw mat".

By the 11th century, the Petatlán area was inhabited by three ethnic groups: the Cuitlatecos, the Chumbias and the Pantecas. First Aztec presence in the Costa Grande region came in 1497. In 1504, Moctezuma Xocoyotzin established the tribute province of Cihuatlán, with included the Petatlán area.

After the Spanish conquest of the Aztec Empire, Petatlán was part of an encomienda belonging to Ginés de Pinzón. Evangelization was carried out under Augustinian Juan Bautista Moya. This same friar gathered the dispersed peoples to found the modern town in 1550. This town became a dependency of the subdelegation of Zacatuna in 1786.

During the Mexican War of Independence, Petatlán was made part of the Tecpan province, which was created by José María Morelos y Pavón in 1811. During the reign of Agustín de Iturbide, it became part of the Capitanía General del Sur. When Mexico became a republic, it became part of the district of Acapulco, in the State of Mexico. When Guerrero was made an independent state, Petatlán became part of the district of Galeana.

It became an independent municipality for the first time in 1870, combining territory from the municipality of De la Union and some communities from Tecpan. It was for a short time in 1871 and then reconstituted. In 1913, the town was besieged by the Zapatistas. In 1953, some of its western territory was lost in the formation of the José Azueta (Zihuatanejo) municipality.

The city's and municipality's recent history has centered on violence related to drugs and the environment. Drug-related violence of the past several decades has taken its toll as tourism is down, fewer come to shop in the city and many residents stay indoors for fear of a stray bullet. The violence and threats of violence have left streets empty after 7 pm. Pickups and SUVs with darkened windows are a common sight. These vehicles are associated with the many shootings and even grenade attacks that have taken place in and around the city in recent years. The violence is not limited to the city of Petatlán; it also occurs in its small rural communities such as La Morena, El Camalote and Las Humedades. A number of these have been partly or fully abandoned as drug-related violence grows. The violence is among local drug lords over turf.

Other disputes are centered more in the rural areas over protected wildlife and natural resource rights. In 2004, there were problems with the illegal hunting of sea turtles and the collection of their eggs on beaches such as Playa San Valentin. In 2010, residents of Juluchuca and other nearby communities staged a sit-in near an arroyo where their rights to extract water were revoked to allow for drilling for petroleum.

The most serious conflict has been between the “campesinos” (peasant farmers) and local caciques (bosses) over logging and drug crop growing/transport in the mountain areas of the municipality and other parts of the Costa Grande of Guerrero. In the 1990s, the logging company Boise Cascade Corp. made efforts to establish itself in this part of Guerrero state, making arrangements with national and local leaders to log forests located on ejido land in the area. The logging quickly began to exceed legal limits and began seriously damaging the ecology of the area, such as causing rivers and streams like the Coyuquilla River to dry up. Local farmers depend on these resources and, in the late 1990s, banded together to form the Campesino Environmentalist Organization of Petatlan and Coyuca de Catalan (OCEP). The group is best known for blocking logging roads, which had an effect on the industry. In 1998, two of the movement's leaders, Rodolfo Montiel and Teodoro Cabrerea, confessed to charges. With the support of Amnesty International, Greenpeace and others, the two were released in 2001. Since then, there has been continued sporadic violence, including killings, leading to human rights condemnations. Another activist, Felipe Arriaga Sanchez, was detained on charges of murder and criminal association in 2004. Amnesty International believes that it is politically motivated. The OCEP continues to exist and fight deforestation mostly through legal channels, although some are still accused by authorities of drug trafficking and membership in a guerrilla group. The group states the charges come from local caciques when the group pushes for new legal actions. The group has had more success in the Petatlan Valley than in Coyuquilla Valley, but in both areas there continues to be large-scale illegal cutting, with cleared areas then being used for pasture or to grow drugs. The environment destruction forces many local farmers to become part of the drug production to survive.
