= Isidoro Montes de Oca =

Mexican general (1789–1847)

Isidoro Montes de Oca (1789–1847) was a Mexican of Spanish descent born in La Unión (now La Unión de Isidoro Montes de Oca, in Guerrero, Mexico) who was a revolutionary general who fought in the Mexican War of Independence between 1810 and 1821. He was among the commanders of the army of Vicente Guerrero and José María Morelos. He was a trusted man of Vicente Guerrero and was his sub-general. He is a relative of Juan Montes de Oca, he a prior Administrator, who according to Rafael Bernal says had come from Mexico himself and brought family, Juan Montes de Oca was Prior of Guadalupe Church in San Pedro Macati (now Makati), in the Philippines. Consequently, the Mexican War of Independence was fought under the banner of Our Lady of Guadalupe.

He originated from the Rancho de La Alhaja, in the municipality of La Unión. He attended many war actions under the command of Morelos and Guerrero. He was head of the escort of Generalissimo Morelos called the 50 pairs. The main battle action where he stood out was that of the Treasury of Tamo, in Michoacán on September 15, 1818, in which the opposing forces numbered four times greater, they were totally destroyed. On the death of Don José María Morelos, on December 22, 1815, few insurgents remained fighting the royalists. The majority were pardoned but Vicente Guerrero continued fighting in the mountains of the south, who in the hacienda of Tamo (of the State of Michoacán today), together with Don Isidro Montes de Oca and with few and poorly armed insurgents, inflicted a real defeat on the royalist José Gabriel de Armijo and they also got enough equipment to properly arm 1,800 soldiers of freedom who in the future will deserve the respect of Agustín de Iturbide.

He stood out for his courage in the siege of the Port of Acapulco in 1813, under the orders of General José María Morelos y Pavón, as well as in the Cuautla Site. He was present in the historical deed called Acatempan's embrace, between Iturbide and Vicente Guerrero. Near the end of the war he reached the rank of captain general. After the end of the Mexican war of independence, he obtained some positions in the government of the republic, standing out as senator of the State of Sonora. Later he retired from public life and took refuge in the town of Petatlán, Guerrero, where he dedicated himself to the administration of his property, as well as to cattle raising and agriculture. He spent his last days of life in that place. His remains are in the parish of Petatlán in whose town he died at the age of 58. At the death of Vicente Guerrero, Juan Álvarez was the political heir. Álvarez began to direct the followers of President Vicente Guerrero sacrificed in 1831. Other minor caciques and military leaders, including General Isidro Montes de Oca, joined around Álvarez.

According to Ricardo Pinzon, two Philippine-born soldiers — Francisco Mongoy and Isidoro Montes de Oca — were so distinguished in battle that they are regarded as folk heroes in Mexico. General Vicente Guerrero later became the first president of Mexico of African descent.

Around the 1930s, the municipality La Unión Guerrero adopted its current name, La Unión de Isidoro Montes de Oca, in honor of the insurgent captain. His remains rest in the municipal pantheon of Petatlán, Guerrero.
