= San Miguel Totolapan (municipality) =

Municipality in the Mexican state of Guerrero

- Municipality
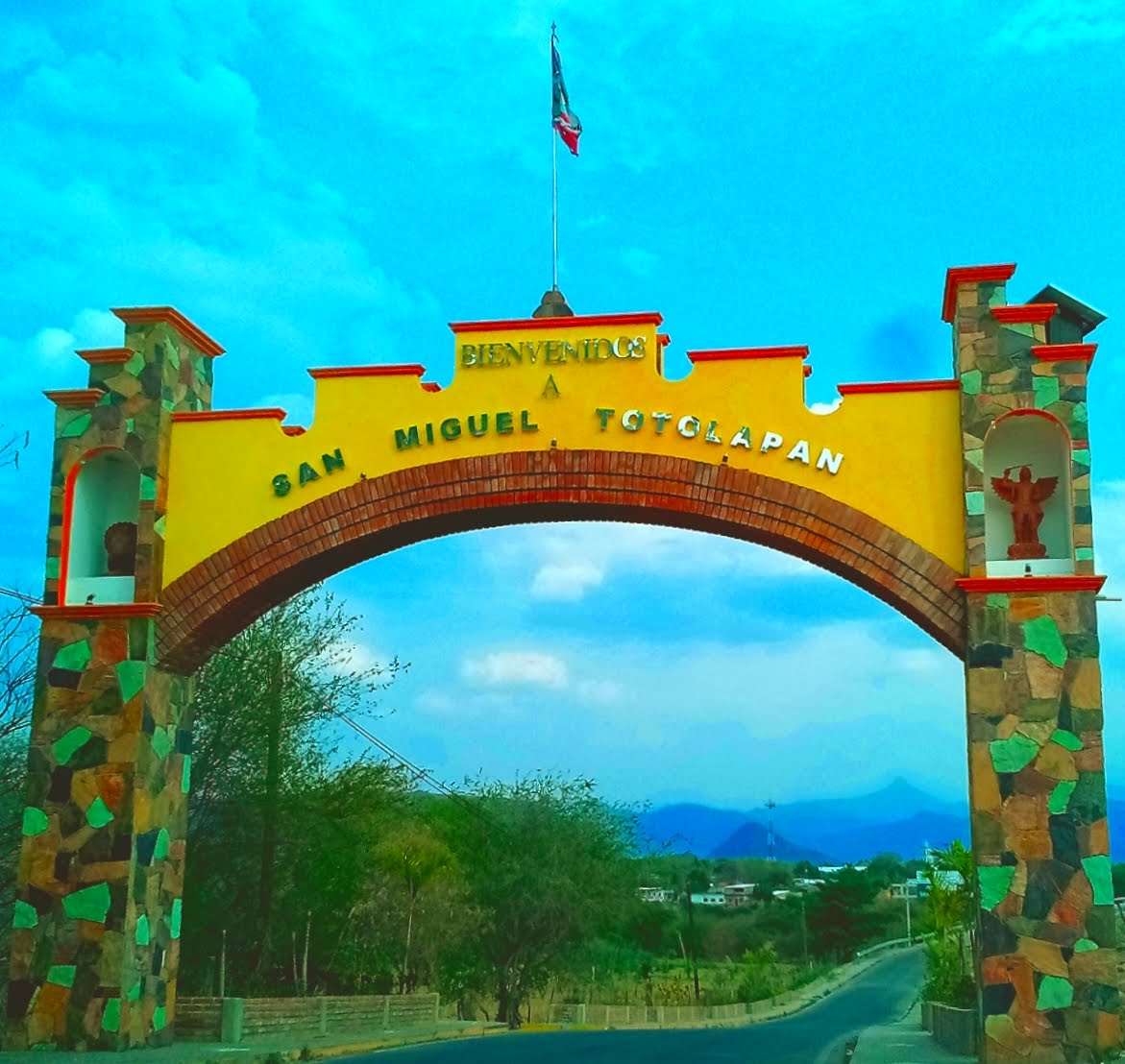

- Location in Mexico
- Coordinates: 17°31′N 100°08′W
- Country: Mexico
- State: Guerrero
- Municipal seat: San Miguel Totolapan

Area
  - Total: 2,648.1 km^{2} (1,022.4 sq mi)

Population (2020)
  - Total: 24,139

San Miguel Totolapan is a municipality in the Mexican state of Guerrero. The municipal seat lies at San Miguel Totolapan. The municipality covers an area of 2,648.1 km^{2}.

As of 2020, the municipality had a total population of 24,139.
