= La Unión, Guerrero =

City in the Mexican state of Guerrero

La Unión
- Municipal seat and city
- Location in Mexico La Unión (Mexico)
- Coordinates: 17°58′N 101°49′W
- Country: Mexico
- State: Guerrero
- Municipality: La Unión de Isidoro Montes de Oca

Population (2005)
  - Total: 3,079
- Time zone: UTC-6 (Zona Centro)

La Unión is a city and seat of the municipality of La Unión de Isidoro Montes de Oca, in the Mexican state of Guerrero. In 2005 its population was 3,079.
