= Coyuquilla sur =

Village in Guerrero, Mexico

Coordinates: 17°26′21.1″N 99°32′42.35″W

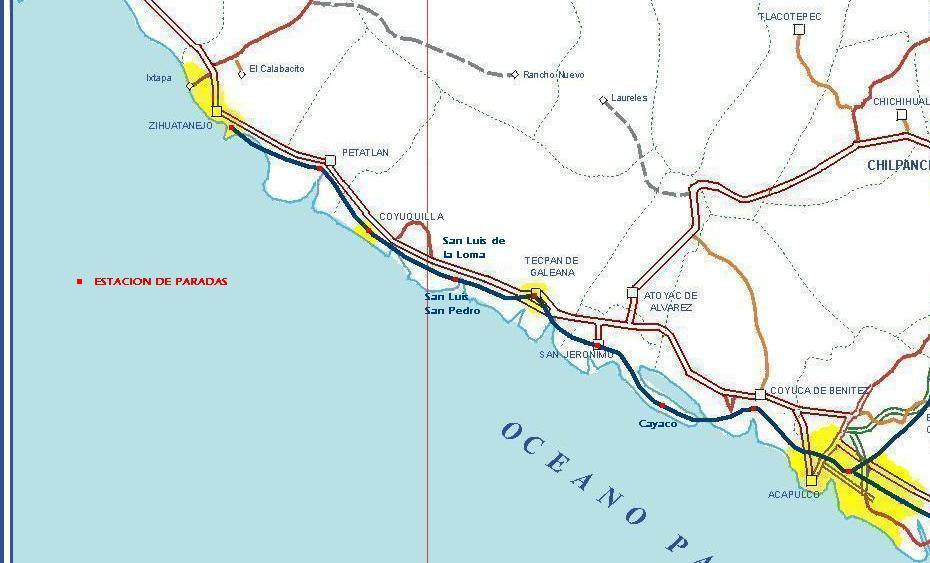

Coyuquilla Sur (Coyuquilla Viejo) is a village in the Mexican state of Guerrero in the municipality of Petatlán.

At an altitude of 10 meters, Coyuquilla Sur (Coyuquilla Viejo) had a population of 548 in the 2011 census. About 58.76 percent of the local population are adults.

Although the median number of years at school is 6, there are about 78 illiterate people.

The principal sports are basketball, football,, soccer, fishing and swimming.
