= Barra de Potosí =

Fishing village in Guerrero, Mexico

Coordinates: 17°32′15″N 101°26′30″W

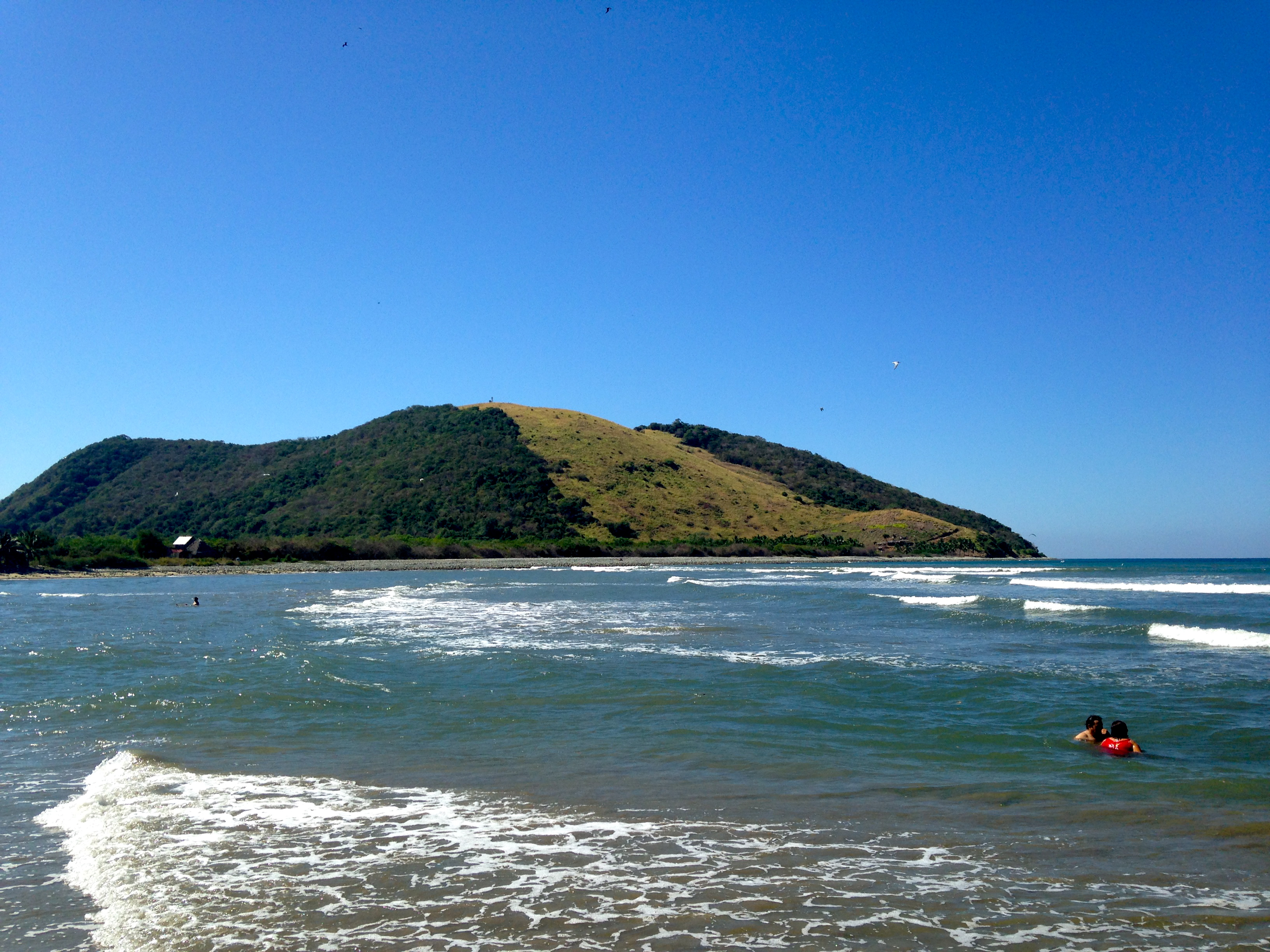
Panoramic view of Barra de Potosí

Barra de Potosí is a small fishing village in the Mexican state of Guerrero, that is located in the municipality of Petatlan. Situated at the edge of Laguna Potosí, the village itself consists of three main streets crossed by two streets and as of the 2011 census by INEGI was considered to have 396 inhabitants; 211 men and 185 women.

The area is mostly known by local tour guides and on Trip Advisor as a tourist destination for days trips from local inland communities and from Zihuatanejo. Enramadas (open palapa covered restaurants) line the edge of the lagoon and the beach front and are especially popular with weekend visitors for the fresh fish served there. Local villagers offer lagoon tours, fishing trips, rental kayaks and during the winter months, humpback whale watching tours.

The lagoon and surrounding eco-system covers 800 hectares (1,977 acres) with 454 hectares (1,122 acres) of mangrove. In a recent study published by Professor Alejandro Meléndez Herrada of UAM (Universidad Autónoma Metropolitana Unidad Xochimilco) 212 species of bird have been identified in the area. Of these, 82 are aquatic or marine species, 23 are endemic and 19 are listed as "at risk" by the NOM-059-SEMARNAT-2010.

Studies by biology students of Professor Meléndez have found that the area supports 188 species of butterflies, 68 of fish, 3 of amphibians, 18 reptiles, 133 mammals, 488 plants, 122 micro-algae and 303 reef dwellers. Currently (as of September 2015) studies are being conducted on beetles, and bird life in the surrounding coconut groves. A recently published book "Biodiversidad de Barra de Potosí, Guerrero, México" discusses the interaction between conservation and tourism as it relates to the Barra de Potosí ecosystem.
