= Palapa (structure) =

Open-sided dwelling with a palm leaf thatched roof

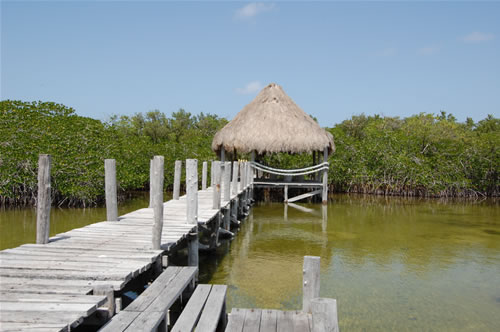
A palapa on the Huach River

A palapa (a Spanish word of Tagalog origin, originally meaning "petiole of the palm leaf") is an open-sided dwelling with a thatched roof made of dried palm leaves. It is very useful in hot weather and, therefore, very common on Mexican beaches and deserts.

The palapa is derived from the traditional construction methods of the bahay kubo ("nipa hut") architectural style of the Philippines, carried to Nueva España (along with coconuts, which are not native to the Americas) via the Manila galleons during the Spanish colonial period.

Palapas are also common in Honduras and other Central American countries. In Nicaragua they are very common and known locally as ranchos.

== See also ==
- Barra de Potosi
- Bohío, Caribbean dwelling with palm thatched roof once commonly found in Puerto Rico, Cuba and Hispaniola.
- Chickee, the Creek/Seminole word to describe an open dwelling with a palm thatched roof frequently constructed by Florida's Native Americans.
- Manila Galleons, Spanish Colonial Mexico and Spanish East Indies trade/cultural exchange route.
