= Troncones =

- Village
- The Inn at Manzanillo Bay
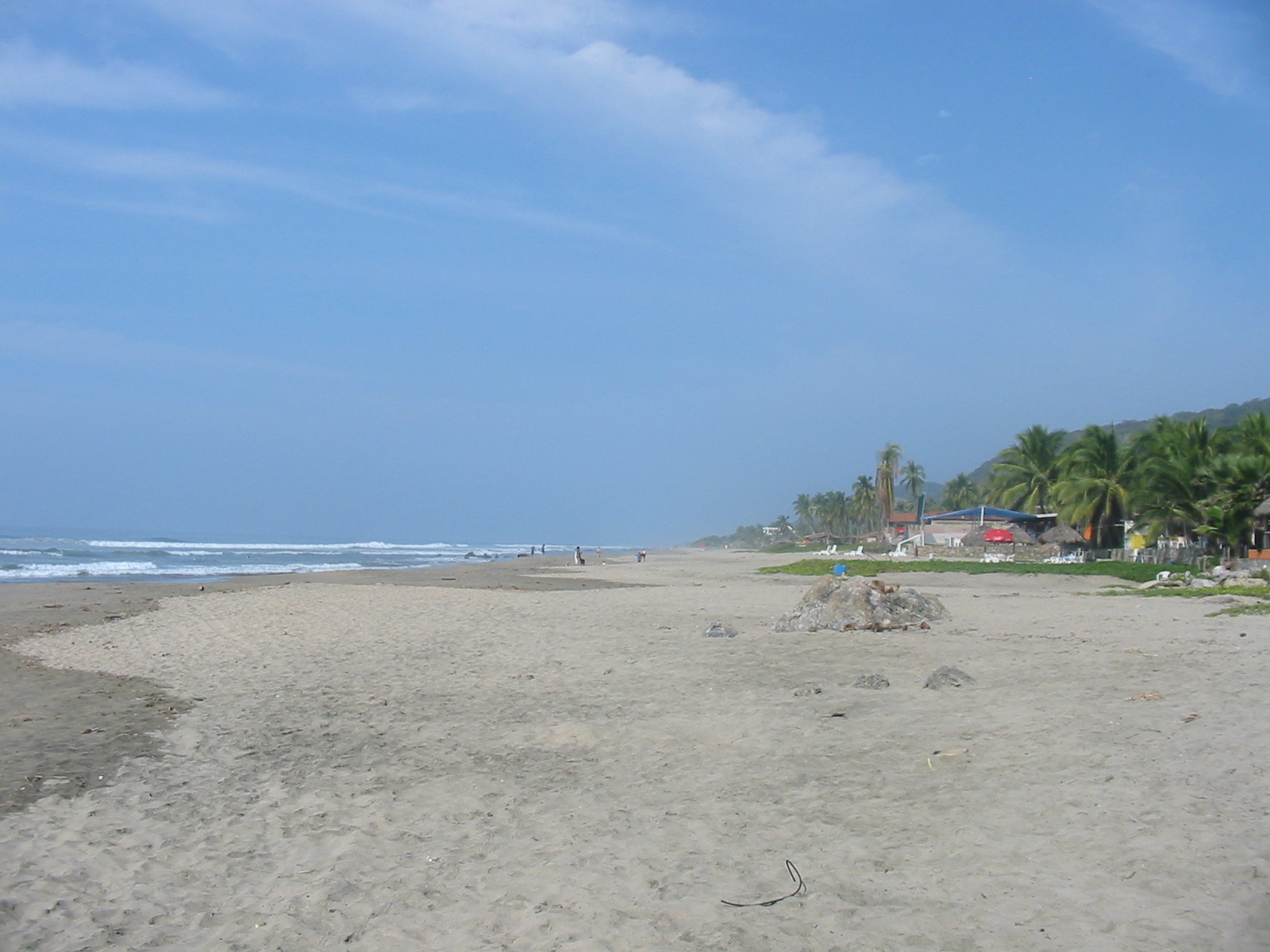
- Troncones Beach
- Interactive map of Troncones
- Coordinates: 17°46′49″N 101°43′21″W
- Country: Mexico
- State: Guerrero
- Municipality: La Unión de Isidoro Montes de Oca

Area
  - Total: 0.72 km^{2} (0.28 sq mi)
- Elevation: 3 m (9.8 ft)

Population (2020)
  - Total: 699
- Time zone: UTC-6 (CST)

Troncones is a relatively undeveloped, uncrowded beach village located about 20 miles (32 km) north west of Zihuatanejo on the coast of the state of Guerrero. It is located in the municipality of La Unión de Isidoro Montes de Oca and has a population of about 593 people (2005 census). Hammocks and palm trees are in most yards, chickens roam the streets and loud nightlife is limited to very few weekly events, making for quiet nights. Some local hotels and restaurants offer special events such as Movie Nights and Dance Parties, mostly during the Oct-May high season. On Sundays, El Burro Boracho has shows of Mexican folkdance.

Troncones has not been well-known until only recently. It was “discovered” by a North American sports fisherman who bought land here and convinced some of his compatriots to do the same. These property owners set up private homes or small hotels and guesthouses. Over the last 20 years, the population has grown as the local ejido benefits from increased tourism income, while maintaining a small-town aesthetic, in stark contrast to the high-rise hotels of nearby Ixtapa. On the 5 kilometers (3.1 mi) of beach, exist these houses, a few restaurants, a couple of grocery stores, and a growing number of eco-hostels, campgrounds, and surf schools. Even in the high season in the winter and spring it is possible to walk along the beach and not run into anyone.

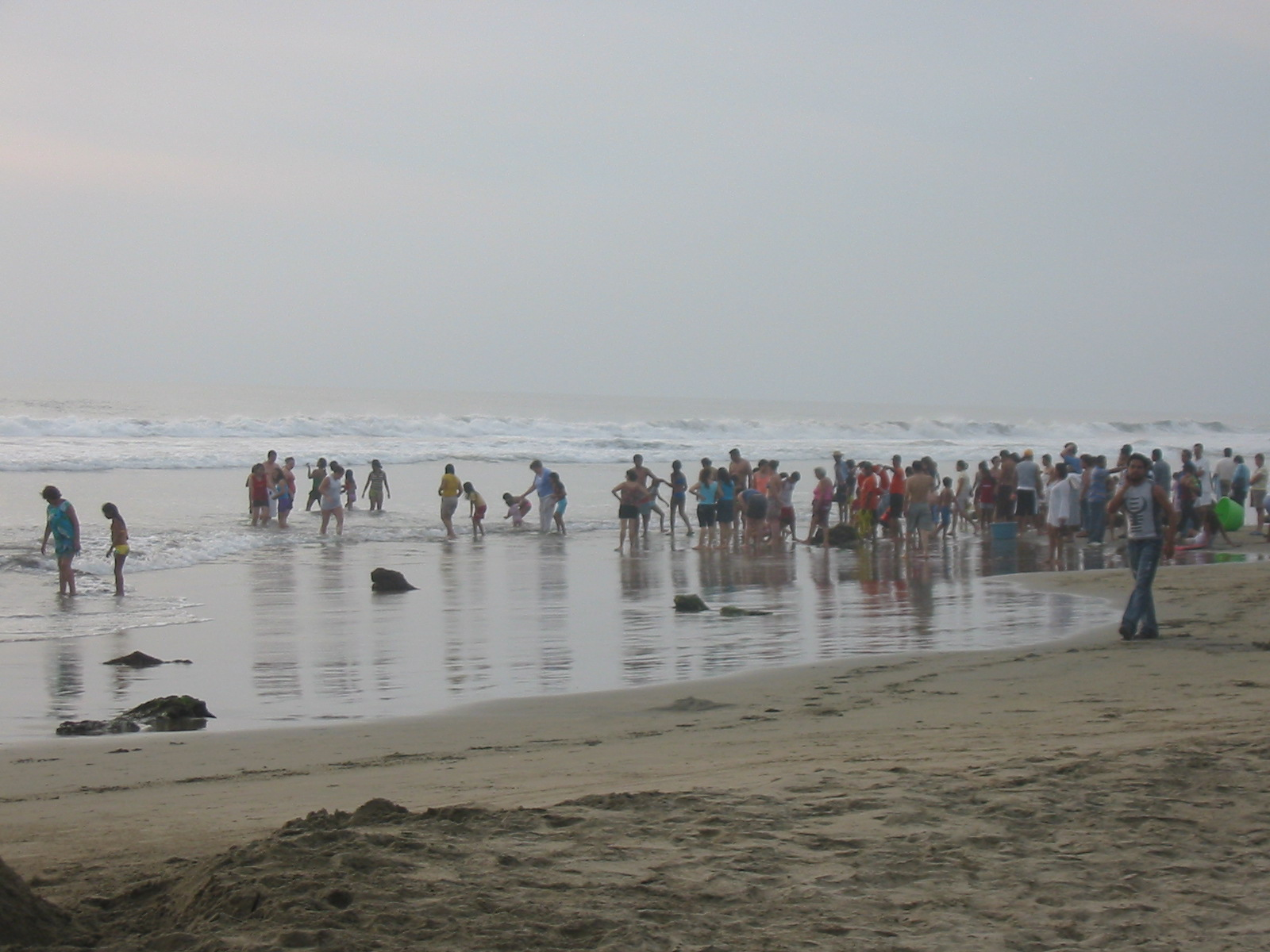
Release of baby sea turtles at Troncones Beach on 25 December 2007

The major surfing area is called Troncones Point, a steady left break. Waves tend to be smaller in the winter, as the Point needs a southern swell to break well, and it is recommended for confident surfers because it is a rock bottom with some coral. Many hotels offer surfing classes. There is only one surf shop, but several of the hotels have basic equipment for ding repair, waxing, fin replacement, and other emergencies. There is also a professional surfboard shaper in town who offers repair services. There are many breaks and few surfers, especially in the low season of June - October when the swell is from the south and the breaks at Troncones Point and El Rancho can hit 25 feet (7.6 m). Breaks in Troncones tend to be gentler in the "shoulder seasons" of spring and fall, and some spots are better suited to long boarders. Near the beach are two sea caves called Troncones and Majahua as well as a waterfall called Cascadas Artesianas. Sportsfishing trips to the open ocean are available as well.

In 2008, two surfers were attacked and killed by sharks in the waters off Troncones and nearby Zihuatanejo. They were the first fatal shark attacks in these waters in thirty years. Bull sharks gathered in large numbers for unknown reasons. Many have contended the reason were historically cold currents, drawing the sharks much nearer to the shore than usual. Two surfers were killed and a third was injured. The attacks occurred during a three-week period causing a “Jaws-like mania” and the construction of lifeguard towers and the establishment of a shark patrol for the beaches of Zihuatanejo and north. It was a rare phenomenon that subsided after the sharks dispersed.

== Geography ==
=== Climate ===
Climate data for Troncones
Month	Jan	Feb	Mar	Apr	May	Jun	Jul	Aug	Sep	Oct	Nov	Dec	Year
Mean daily maximum °C (°F)	31 (88)	31 (88)	31 (88)	32 (90)	33 (91)	32 (90)	32 (90)	32 (90)	32 (89)	32 (90)	32 (90)	32 (89)	32 (90)
Mean daily minimum °C (°F)	20 (68)	20 (68)	22 (72)	23 (73)	24 (75)	25 (77)	25 (77)	25 (77)	24 (75)	24 (75)	23 (73)	21 (70)	23 (73)
Average precipitation mm (inches)	23 (0.9)	2.5 (0.1)	5.1 (0.2)	0 (0)	18 (0.7)	190 (7.3)	150 (6.1)	190 (7.5)	310 (12.4)	110 (4.4)	18 (0.7)	7.6 (0.3)	1,030 (40.6)
Source: Weatherbase
