= Sweet acacia =

Sweet acacia is a common name for several plants and may refer to:

- Acacia suaveolens, endemic to Australia
- Vachellia farnesiana, native to Mexico and Central America, and widely introduced
