= San Miguel Totolapan =

City in the Mexican state of Guerrero

- Municipal seat and city
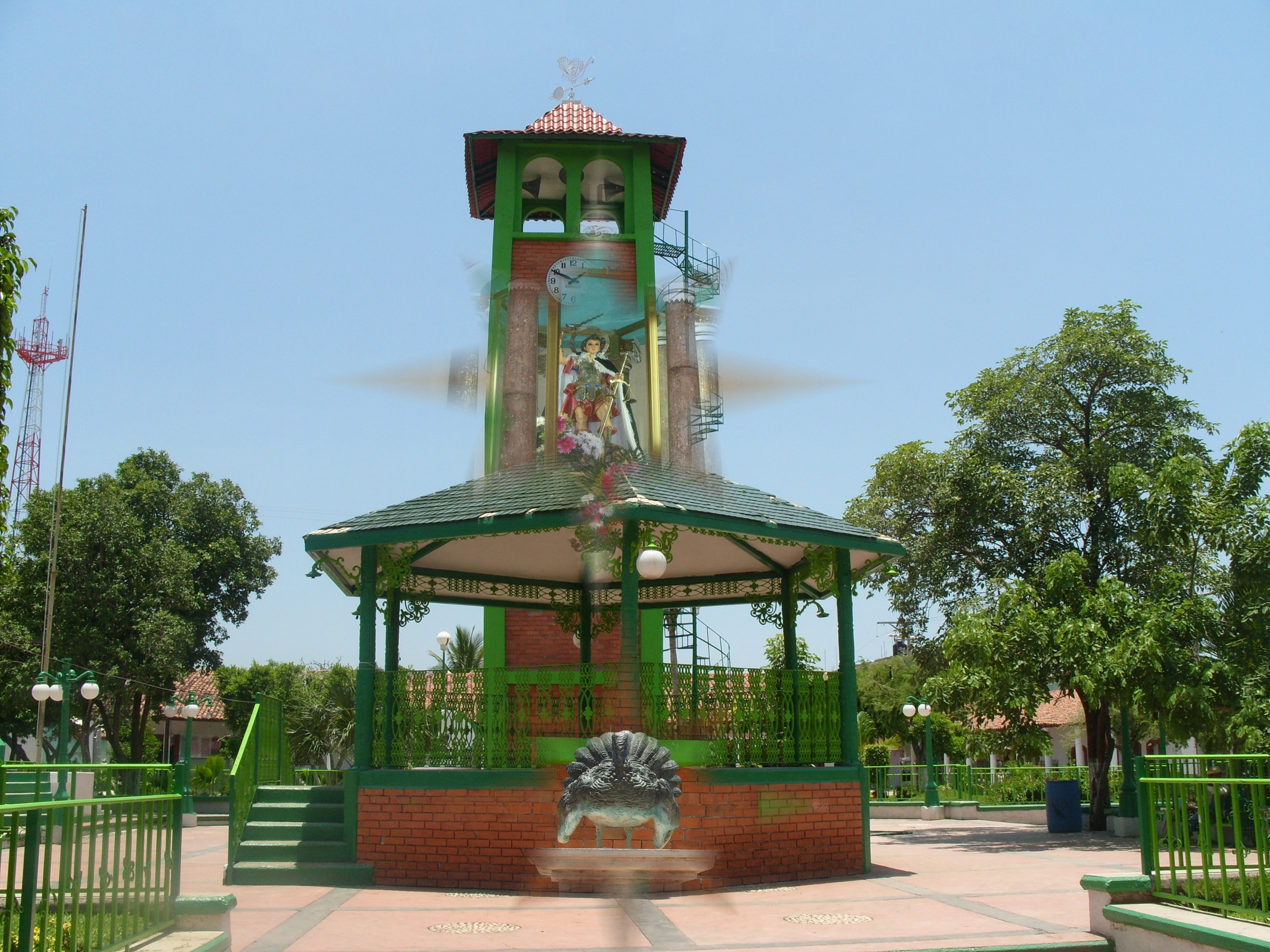
- Zócalo

- Location in Mexico San Miguel Totolapan (Mexico)
- Coordinates: 18°09′32″N 100°23′27″W
- Country: Mexico
- State: Guerrero
- Municipality: San Miguel Totolapan
- Time zone: UTC-6 (Zona Centro)

San Miguel Totolapan is a city and seat of the municipality of San Miguel Totolapan, in the state of Guerrero, southern Mexico.

In 2020, the total population of San Miguel Totolapan was 24,139 inhabitants, with 50.8% women, and 49.2% men. The age ranges that concentrated the largest population were 0 to 4 years (2,984 inhabitants), 5 to 9 years (2,870 inhabitants), and 10 to 14 years (2,672 inhabitants). Among them, they concentrated 35.3% of the total population. Due to low population number, as well as other issues, San Miguel Totolapan’s urban sprawl has been fairly poor with the city registering a 5.8 on the SNDi index, meaning the streets are not well connected and this affects the livability and environmental footprint for decades and centuries to come as well as affecting health, the environment, overconsumption, social segregation, and equity. This could and probably is a contributing factor of the economy and its subsequent poverty figures. Figures taken in 2020 that show 42.6% of the population being in moderate poverty and 41.7% being in extreme poverty.

The Cuitlatec language, now extinct, used to be spoken in San Miguel Totolapan. Juana Can, the last speaker of Cuitlatec, is believed to have died in San Miguel Totolapan in the 1960s.

On 5 October 2022 members of the Los Tequileros criminal gang opened fire on the town hall, killing eighteen people, including the mayor Conrado Mendoza Almeda and his father.
