= Cuitlatec language =

Extinct language isolate of Mexico

Cuitlatec
- Uhpɨnéʔlu
- Native to: Mexico
- Region: Guerrero
- Ethnicity: Cuitlatec people
- Extinct: 1960s, with the death of Juana Can
- Language family: Language isolate

Language codes
- ISO 639-3: cuy
- Glottolog: cuit1236

Cuitlatec, or Cuitlateco, is an extinct language isolate of Mexico, formerly spoken by an indigenous people known as Cuitlatec.

== Classification ==
Cuitlatec has not been convincingly classified as belonging to any language family. It is believed to be a language isolate. In their controversial classification of the indigenous languages of the Americas, Greenberg and Ruhlen include Cuitlatec in an expanded Chibchan language family (Macro-Chibchan), along with a variety of other Mesoamerican and South American languages. Escalante Hernández suggests a possible relation to the Uto-Aztecan languages.

== Geographic distribution ==
Cuitlatec was spoken in the state of Guerrero. In the 16th century, the Relaciones geográficas recorded Cuitlatec spoken in Ajuchitlán and Tetela del Rio, while it was also known to be spoken along much of the Costa Grande. By the 1930s, Cuitlatec was spoken only in San Miguel Totolapan. The last speaker of the language, Juana Can, is believed to have died in the 1960s. In 1979, only two elderly women, Florentina Celso and Apolonia Robles, were able to remember about fifty words of the language.

== Phonology ==
=== Consonants ===
Cuitlatec consonant phonemes
	Labial	Dental	Palatal	Velar	Labio-velar	Glottal
Plosive	p b	t d	tʃ	k ɡ	kʷ	ʔ
Fricative		ɬ	ʃ			h
Approximant		l	j		w	
Nasal	m	n				

- The sounds /f/, /s/, /r/, and /ɾ/ are found in loan words from Spanish.

=== Vowels ===
Cuitlatec vowel phonemes
	Front	Central	Back
High	i	ɨ	u
Low	e	a	o

== Grammar ==
Sentences generally follow SVO word order. Adjectives precede the nouns they modify. Cuitlatec is agglutinative and mainly suffixing. It appears to use a vigesimal counting system. There do not appear to be relational nouns or directionals. The kinship system only distinguishes gender in the generation of the speaker and older generations.

== Vocabulary ==
Cuitlatec	English
aʔnelgái	Cuitlatec people
uhpɨnéʔlu	Cuitlatec language
aikimɨ	hello
šelopɨlʔmɨ	thanks
aškɨli	man
ɬɨnóʔo	woman, wife
cɨʔɨ	children
iwililúmɨ	river
úmɨ	water
ahpúʔɬɨ	sun
tuɬíʔi	moon, month
kúʔli	land
ɬa	house
ihšɨɬɨ	sky
iʔkɨʔɨ	tomb
iʔyɨʔléɬɨ	door

=== Trees ===
Cuitlatec	Common name	Scientific name
citakáʔli	Sweet acacia, Cascalote	Vachellia farnesiana, Caesalpinia coriaria
éhci	Capire	Sideroxylon cartilagineum
nempáʔa	Monkeypod tree, Camachile	Pithecellobium dulce
ɨncipéʔɬu	Charamasca	Tanacetum annuum
puɬɨʔmelpɨmɨ	Nanche, hogberry	Byrsonima crassifolia
ɬɨmšíli; šemɨʔšilí	Tololote	Andira inermis
šiɬiʔá	Tepemesquite	Lysiloma divaricatum
wíhci	Chupandia	Cyrtocarpa procera
yóʔo	White leadtree	Leucaena leucocephala
mɨnɨmɨli	Gliricidia	Gliricidia sepium

=== Placenames ===
Cuitlatec	English
šamigéli	San Miguel Totolapan
šišmɨwɨ	Ajuchitlán
pulkúʔwɨ	Mexico City

=== Body Parts ===
Cuitlatec	English
kwérpu	body
íhcɨ	arm
ɨmté	head
úli	hair
kúʔbe	neck
šuwéʔe	nose
šúhpe	mouth
kahcíʔdi	ears
ihpɨléla	stomach
puɬké	back
álmɨ	heart
ehtɨʔi	tongue
díšci	leg
iškélɨ	foot
dehpɨlkoyó	ankle
ihtalói	waist
dašíʔi	knee
dašilapɨ	elbow
gɨléwɨ	face
enhkeyáta	the whole face

=== Numerals ===
Cuitlatec	Numbers
tɨʔɨ, tɨwɨlɨ, téʔɬi	1
káɬɨ	2
kalíɬɨ	3
páɬa	4
puwáɬɨ	5
dašíɬa	6
wɨšíɬɨ	7
puhtalíɬa	8
nɨɬɨ	9
šɨɬɨ	10
pɨli	11
méɬi	20
kɨɬmɨli	30
kaltɨwɨlméɬi	40
puhmé	100

== Bibliography ==
- Susana Drucker, Roberto Escalante, & Roberto J. Weitlaner. 1969. The Cuitlatec. In Evon Z. Vogt, ed., Handbook of Middle American Indians, Ethnology: Vol 7, Chapter 30. University of Texas Press, Austin: 565–575
- McQuown, Norman A. 1945. Fonémica del Cuitlateco. El México Antiguo 5: 239–254.
- Weitlaner, Roberto J. 1939. Notes on the Cuitlatec language. El México Antiguo 4: 363–373.
- Escalante Hernández, Robert (1962). El Cuitlateco . Mexico City: National Institute of Anthropology and History.
