= Petatlán (municipality) =

Municipality in the Mexican state of Guerrero

- Municipality
- Location in Mexico
- Coordinates: 17°18′N 100°53′W
- Country: Mexico
- State: Guerrero
- Municipal seat: Petatlán

Area
  - Total: 2,071.7 km^{2} (799.9 sq mi)

Population (2005)
  - Total: 44,485
- Website: https://petatlan.gob.mx/

Petatlán is a municipality in the Mexican state of Guerrero. The municipal seat lies at Petatlán. The municipality covers an area of 2,071.7 km^{2} (799.9 sq mi).

As of 2005, the municipality had a total population of 44,485.

== Geography ==
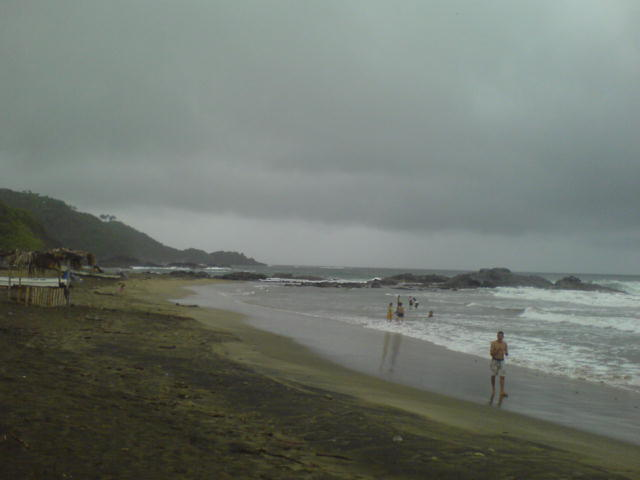
Playa La Barrita

As municipal seat, the city of Petatlán is the local governing authority for over 730 named communities, with a combined territory of 2,071.7 km^{2} (799.9 sq mi) (inegi). About half of the municipality's population of 44,485 people live in the city proper.(inegi) Outside the seat, the most populous are San Jeronimito, Coyuquilla (norte), Palos Blancos and El Mameyal. The municipality borders the municipalities of Coyuca de Catalán, Tecpan de Galeana and Teniente José Azueta with the Pacific Ocean on the south side.

The geography of the area consists of rugged mountains, semi-flat areas and flat areas, which are part of the Costa Grande region. Rugged mountains cover about 70% of the surface, mostly in the north and center, formed by the Sierra Madre del Sur and reach a height of 2,500 m (8,200 ft) above sea level. Semi-flat areas cover about 20% of the surface and are mostly located just north of Highway 200 and are mostly rolling hills. Flat areas cover the rest and are concentrated in the west, southeast and the coastline. Major rivers are the Coyuquilla, Petatlán and San Jeronimito, with a number of arroyos such as the Camotal, La Morena, El Comalate and Coyuca. There are small lakes and lagoons such as the Santiago, Estero Valentín, Salina el Cuajo and Tular. The variations in altitude lead to three types of climate: semi-humid, semi-hot and hot. The first is mostly located in the north along the border with Coyuca de Catalán. The second is in the center and the last is along the coast. In all these climates, there is a rainy season, which lasts from June to October. There are also rains in November and December.

Most of the vegetation is low- and medium-altitude rain forest, whose trees often lose their leaves in the late fall. At the highest elevations, there are forests of pine and holm oak. Wildlife include deer, iguanas, rabbits, armadillos, tejon, raccoons, opossums, skunks, wild cats, buzzards, various types of parrots and other birds. The forests contains harvestable species such as black sapote, ceiba, white oak, mahogany and red cedar. The municipality has a number of beaches including El Mirador, El Cayatal, Valentìn, La Barrita and Juluchuco. El Valentin has a lagoon.

== Population and infrastructure ==
As of 2005, there were 178 people who spoke an indigenous languages, principally Maya or Nahuatl, down from 300 in 2000. From 1995 to 2000, the municipality had a negative population growth of -.55%. The population decreased again from 2000 to 2005 from 47,630 to 46,328.

The municipality has 54 preschools, 186 primary schools, 15 middle schools and three high schools. It has one public library. The municipality has over 10,000 homes, almost all of which are single family structures. There are 34 km of paved road and 119,3 km of dirt road.

The seat of the municipality is Petatlán. Other populated places in the municipality include Coyuquilla Sur, also known as Coyuquilla el Viejo, San Jeronimito and Palos Blancos.

== Archeology ==
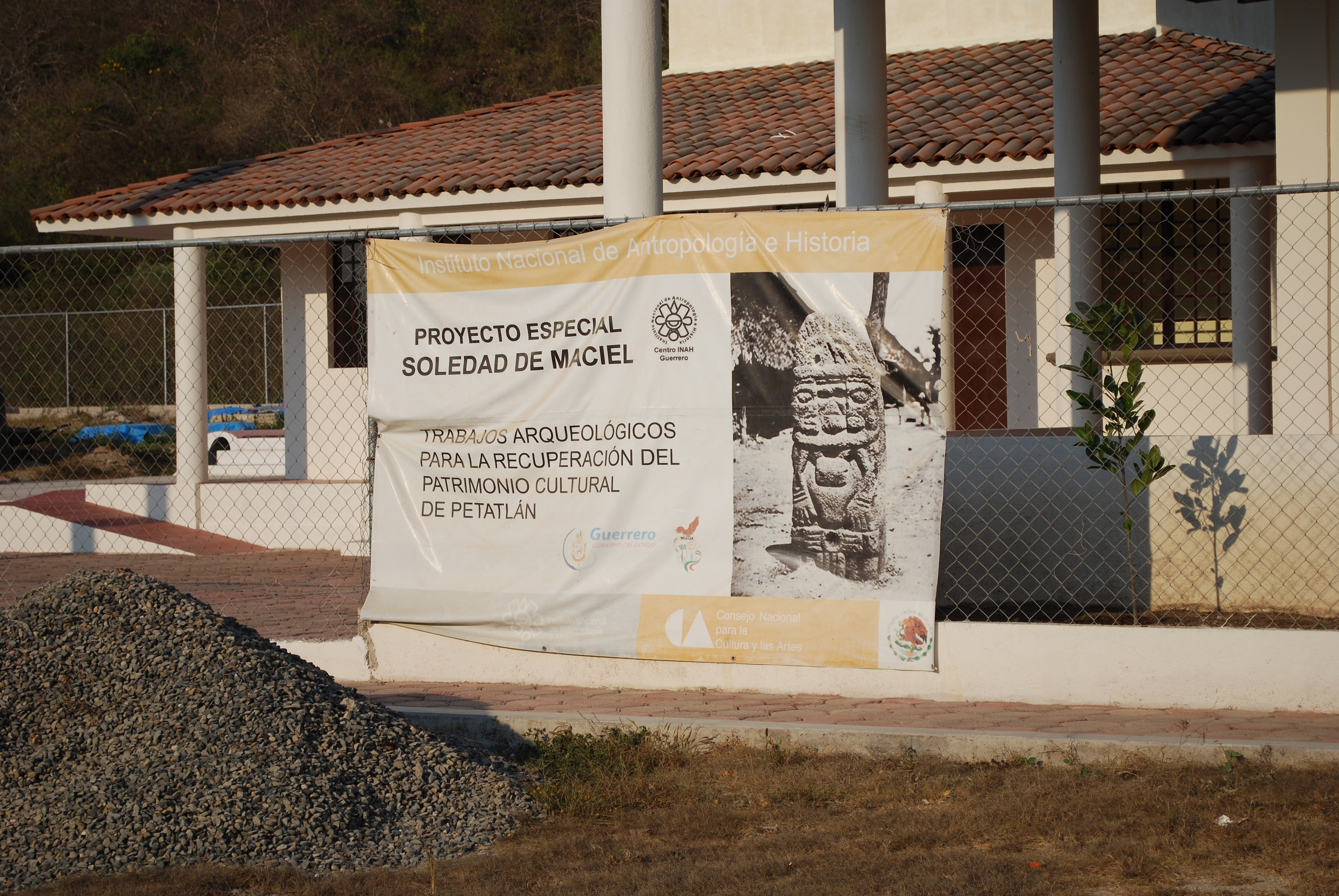
Entrance to La Soledad de Maciel site

The municipality is home to the La Soledad de Maciel archeological site. This site has had pieces recovered from it since the first half of the 20th century, but formal excavation has only occurred in the past decade. The excavated portion is a large ceremonial center with a very large Mesoamerican ball court and a large pyramidal platform. The site may extend much farther than the currently excavated area. Archeological work has found a link between this area and the Teotihuacan civilization. A site museum was opened in 2010.

== Economy ==
Traditionally, Petatlan has been noted for its cattle, production of copra and gold sales. Agriculture and livestock constitutes about 36% of the economy. Mining, petroleum and industry account for about 14.5%. Commerce and services, mostly through small and medium-size enterprises, constitute about half of the economy. Principle crops include corn, beans and chili peppers. Livestock include, in order of importance, cattle, pigs, goats, sheep, horses and domestic fowl. Industry is limited to a soap factory in San Jeronimito and small establishments which dry coconut kernels (copra). Other crafts include wood items, hats made with palm fronds and hammocks.

The municipality has about 60 km (37 mi) of coastline, two lagoons and three rivers from which a wide variety of fish and other seafood is extracted. There are two main fishing cooperatives called El Cayacal and Coyuquilla. Seafood figures prominently in the local diet, especially crab, fish and preparations of ceviche. Another local specialty is tamales with goat meat wrapped in banana leaves. Iguana meat is used either with chili pepper or in a tomato sauce.

== See also ==
- Barra de Potosi, at Laguna Potosi, one of the two lagoons.
- Mexican Federal Highway 200
