= Chumbia language =

Unclassified extinct language of Mexico

Chumbia
- Native to: Mexico
- Region: Guerrero
- Extinct: (date missing)
- Language family: unclassified

Language codes
- ISO 639-3: None (mis)

Chumbia, Chumbio or Chunbia was a language spoken in the far southwest of the Mexican state of Guerrero. In the 19th century, Manuel Orozco y Berra commented in his Geography of Languages and Ethnographic Map of Mexico that this and other languages shared a very small area in the jurisdiction of Zacatula around 1580, which corresponds to present-day western Guerrero. Orozco y Berra mentions that there is no information available about these numerous dialects, so it is impossible to say whether they are distinct languages or the same language. Due to the linguistic complexity in such a small region, Orozco y Berra is inclined to think that it is more likely that they were the same language.

According to the 16th-century Relaciones geográficas, Chumbia was spoken in a town called Vitaluta as well as its subjects. Chumbia territory bordered two other unclassified languages: Tolimec, spoken in the towns of Pochutla, Toliman, and Suchitlan to the east of Chumbia territory, as well as Pantec, spoken in Pantla and Iztapan further east. A "corrupt" (non-standard) variety of Nahuatl was used in Zacatula, and served as the lingua franca for the region.
