= Cuitlatec people =

Practically extinct Indigenous people of Mexico

Cuitlatec
Total population
- Unknown, no longer distinct group

Regions with significant populations
- Mexico (Guerrero)

Languages
- Cuitlatec

Religion
- Mesoamerican religion

The Cuitlatec (alternatively Cuitlateco, Cuitlateca) were an Indigenous people of Mexico. They lived in the Río Balsas and Costa Grande regions of Guerrero state in Mexico's Pacific coast region, and this territory was called Cuitlatecapan in Nahuatl. Their native Cuitlatec language is generally considered to be a language isolate. Cuitlatec is considered extinct as a linguistic group and ethnic identity, the last speaker of the language having died in the 1960s.

== Name ==
The name Cuitlatec is a derogatory Nahuatl exonym, the root cuitlatl carrying the vulgar meaning of "excrement". However, this also been interpreted as "gold people", given that gold was named in Nahuatl teocuitlatl, or "divine excrement". The Cuitlatec name for themselves was aʔnelgái.

== History ==
The archaeological site of Xihuacan is believed to have been inhabited by Cuitlatecs.

The oral tradition of the Cuitlatec of San Miguel Totolapan recounted a migration of unspecified date from Atoyac de Álvarez. In the late postclassic period (1250-1521 AD), the most important town of the coastal Cuitlatec was called Mexcaltepec. Although its precise location is unknown given that it was abandoned by 1580, it was supposedly located in the mountains inland from Atoyac de Álvarez. Mexcaltepec was the center of a regionally important polity, described by Fray Juan de Torquemada as spanning 80 Spanish leagues along the coast and having 150,000 families. Among the subject towns of Mexcaltepec were Acapulco, Citlaltomagua, Coyaco, and Tecpantepec. Most of the Cuitlatec communities in the Balsas basin were subjugated by the expanding Purépecha Empire, and most others by the Aztec Empire.

Their population on the eve of Spanish contact (c. 1520) has been estimated at roughly 141,000, representing 18% of the population of Guerrero at the time. After the Spanish arrived, the Cuitlatec population declined quickly. The population of Mexcaltepec, for instance, fell to only about 1,000 in the course of a few years. The Cuitlatecs resisted the Spanish intensely for more than six decades after the conquest.

== Culture ==
The Relaciones geográficas provide some description of Cuitlatec culture in the sixteenth century. They were an agricultural people, cultivating typical Mesoamerican crops like maize, chile, beans, cotton, cacao, pepitas, melons and gourds. Their houses were small and low, and made out of adobe or sticks with thatched roofs.

Children were named after their day sign according to their version of the tonalpohualli. Marriages were arranged at age four or five, and carried out upon reaching adulthood, with the expectation that it would last for life. The marriage ceremony consisted of coming before an idol and the parents gifting clothing to their child-in-law. Adultery was punished by cutting off the nose of the adulterer, and giving all his property and sisters to the rightful husband. The dead were buried in temples, in a round hole in a seated position, accompanied by food, clothing and slaves.

The Cuitlatec had complex and diverse rituals and cosmology with a great variety of deities. They worshipped the sun and moon and practiced idolatry and bloodletting. A priesthood existed which took care of temples. The head priest spoke with the idols, and to reach such a position he had to be chaste and serve in the temple for four years without leaving.

They were a warlike people, and after being conquered by the Aztecs, they often fought in their wars. They were said to transform into jaguars, lions, lizards, or serpents in order to serve as brave warriors, perhaps alluding to military orders like the jaguar warriors or a belief in nahualism.

By the colonial period, the Cuitlatec were reportedly accustomed to bribes and posed more difficulties in administration than the neighboring Purepecha.
