= La Unión de Isidoro Montes de Oca =

Municipality in the Mexican state of Guerrero

- Municipality
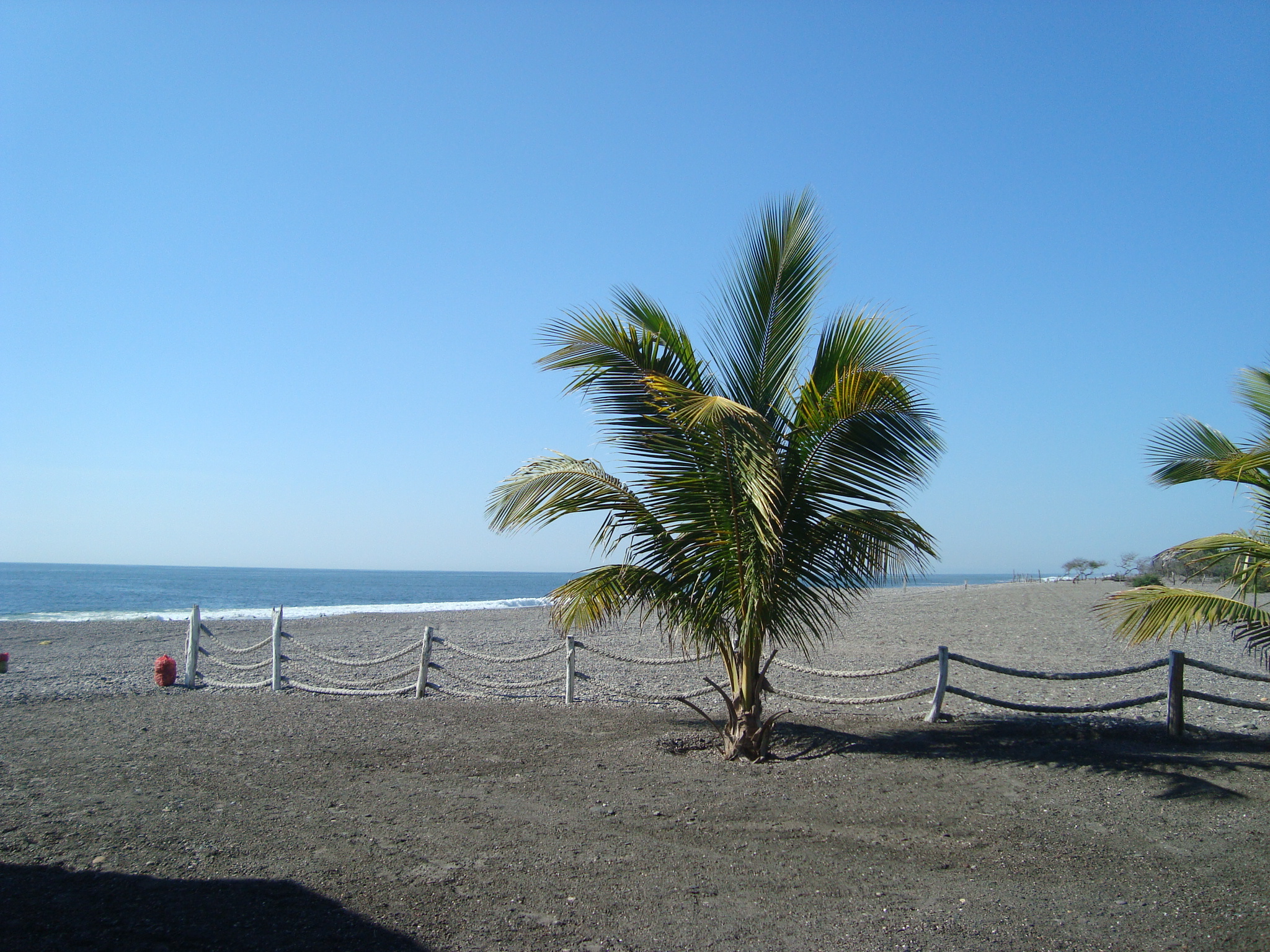
- Beach at Petacalco, in the municipality of La Unión de Isidoro Montes de Oca

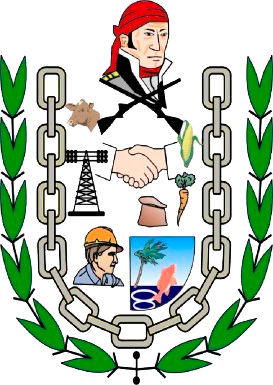
- Coat of arms

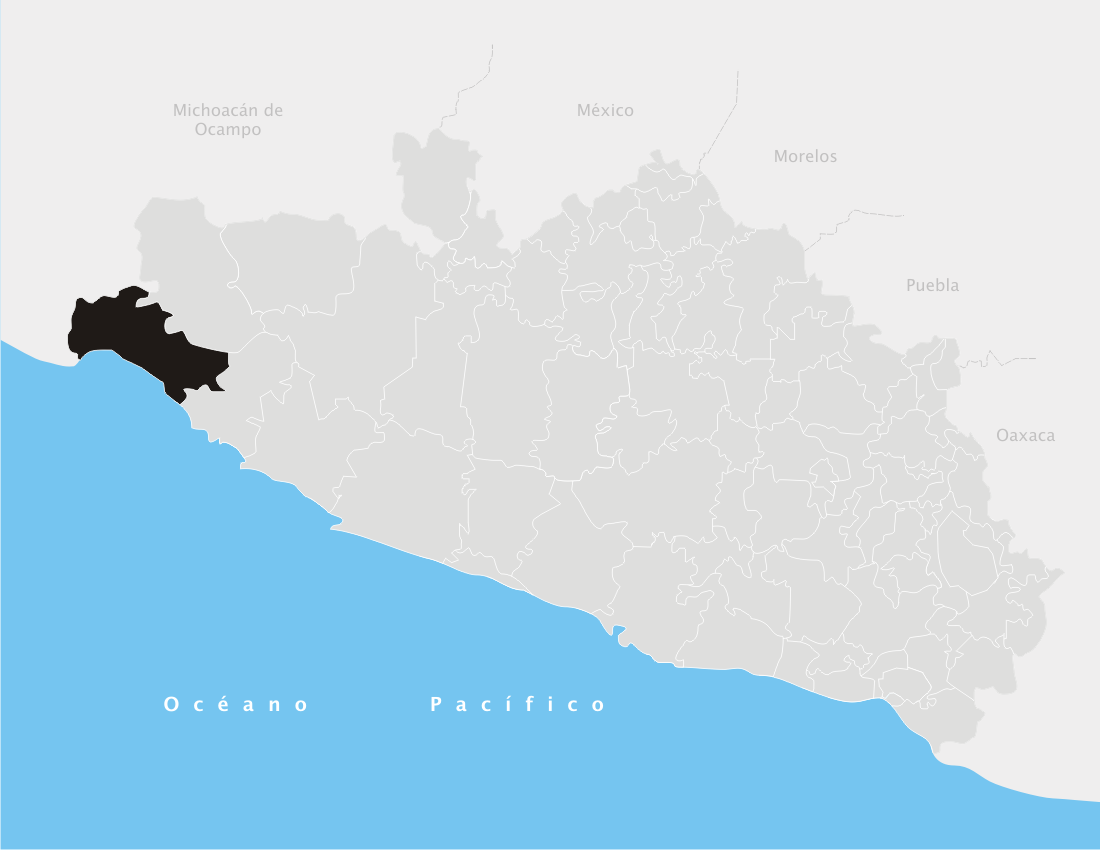
- Municipality of La Unión de Isidoro Montes de Oca in Guerrero

- Location in Mexico
- Coordinates: 18°33′N 101°27′W
- Country: Mexico
- State: Guerrero
- Municipal seat: La Unión
- Named for: Isidoro Montes de Oca

Area
  - Total: 1,142 km^{2} (441 sq mi)

Population (2005)
  - Total: 25,230
- Website: launiondeisidoromontesdeoca.gob.mx

La Unión de Isidoro Montes de Oca is a municipality in the Mexican state of Guerrero and is the westernmost municipality in Guerrero. The municipal seat lies at La Unión. The municipality covers an area of 1,142 km^{2} (441 sq mi).

As of 2005, the municipality had a total population of 25,230.

The main towns are La Unión, population 3,079; Petacalco, population 2,671; Zacatula, population 1,417; Lagunillas, population 1,371; El Naranjito, population 1,167; and Surcua, population 1,046.

== History ==
On 26 October 1614, the Dutch Captain Joris van Spilbergen – involved in his country's war with Spain – raided with an expedition of five ships this part of the coast of what was at that time New Spain. At Zacatula he succeeded in capturing the pearl fishing ship San Francisco.

On 20 July 1993, the municipality of La Unión acquired its current name in commemoration of locally born Independence War hero Isidoro Montes de Oca.
