= 3rd federal electoral district of Guerrero =

Federal electoral district of Mexico

Guerrero's 3rd
- Electoral district of the Chamber of Deputies of Mexico

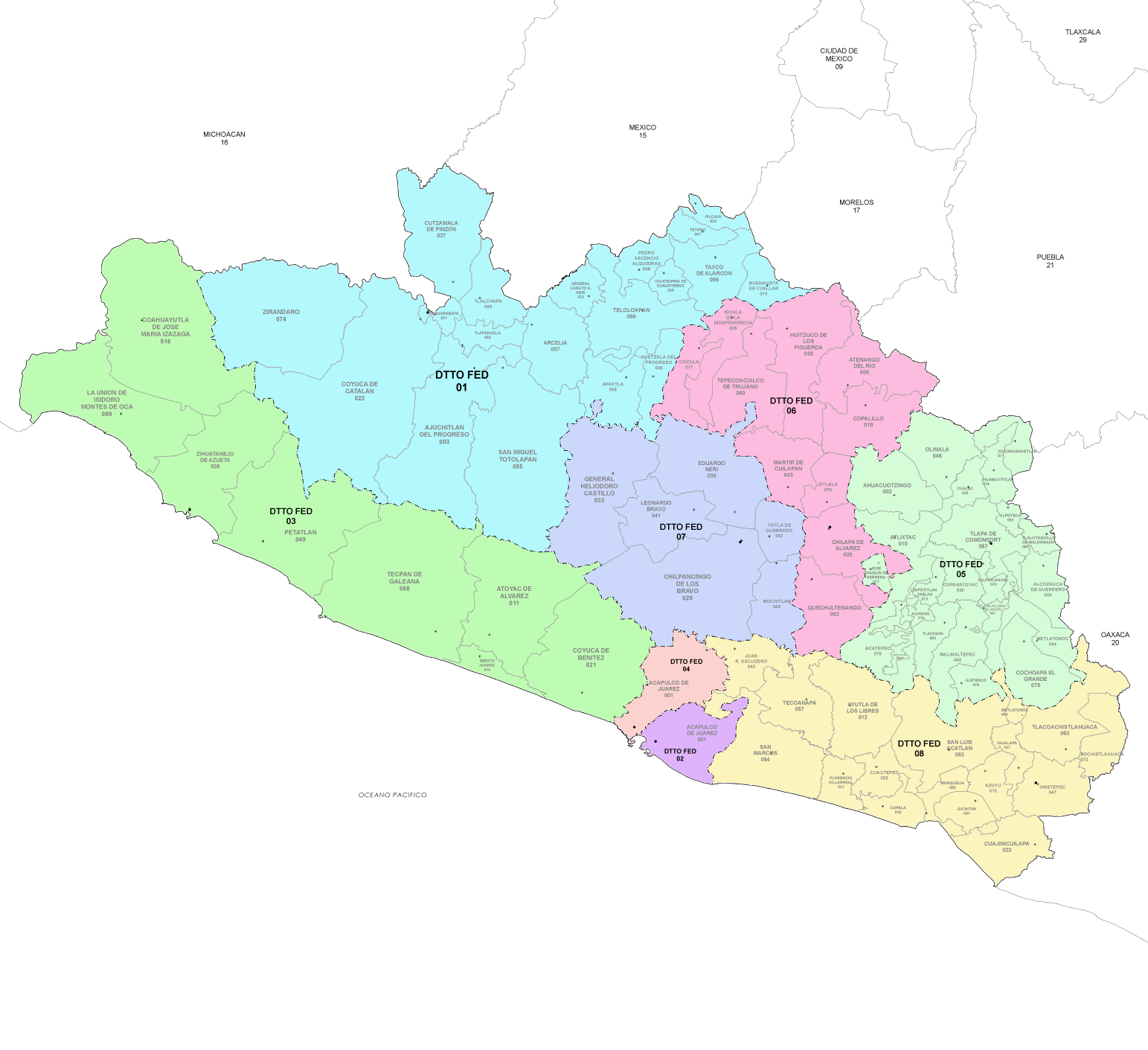
- 3rd district since 2022

Incumbent
- Member: Carmen Cabrera Lagunas
- Party: ▌Ecologist Green Party
- Congress: 66th (2024–2027)

District
- State: Guerrero
- Head town: Zihuatanejo
- Coordinates: 17°39′N 101°33′W
- Covers: Atoyac, Benito Juárez, Coahuayutla, Coyuca de Benítez, La Unión, Petatlán, Tecpan, Zihuatanejo
- PR region: Fourth
- Precincts: 387
- Population: 427,165 (2020 census)

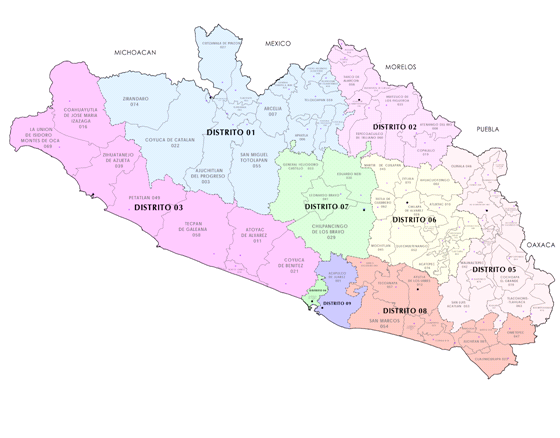
Guerrero under the 2017–2022 districting plan

The 3rd federal electoral district of Guerrero (Spanish: Distrito electoral federal 03 de Guerrero) is one of the 300 electoral districts into which Mexico is divided for elections to the federal Chamber of Deputies and one of eight such districts in the state of Guerrero.

It elects one deputy to the lower house of Congress for each three-year legislative period by means of the first-past-the-post system. Votes cast in the district also count towards the calculation of proportional representation ("plurinominal") deputies elected from the fourth region.

The current member for the district, elected in the 2024 general election, is Carmen Cabrera Lagunas of the Ecologist Green Party of Mexico (PVEM).

== District territory ==
Guerrero lost a congressional seat in the 2023 redistricting process carried out by the National Electoral Institute (INE), but the 3rd district was unaffected by the resulting boundary changes. Under the new districting plan, which is to be used for the 2024, 2027 and 2030 federal elections, it covers the state's Costa Grande region, running from the western outskirts of Acapulco to the border with the state of Michoacán. It comprises 387 electoral precincts (secciones electorales) across eight municipalities:

- Atoyac, Benito Juárez, Coahuayutla, Coyuca de Benítez, La Unión, Petatlán, Tecpan and Zihuatanejo, all of which, except for Atoyac and Coahuayutla, have coastlines along the Pacific.

The head town (cabecera distrital), where results from individual polling stations are gathered together and tallied, is the port city of Zihuatanejo. The district reported a population of 427,165 in the 2020 census.

== Previous districting schemes ==
Evolution of electoral district numbers
	1974	1978	1996	2005	2017	2023
Guerrero	6	10	10	9	9	8
Chamber of Deputies	196	300				

Because of shifting population patterns, Guerrero currently has two fewer districts than the ten the state was assigned under the 1977 electoral reforms that set the national total at 300.

2017–2022

Between 2017 and 2022, the 3rd district had the same configuration as under the 2023 plan, despite the state having an additional district.

2005–2017

Guerrero had nine districts under the 2005 districting plan. The 3rd district was located in the Costa Grande region, with almost the same composition as in the later plans: the southernmost municipality of Coyuca de Benítez, adjacent to Acapulco, was assigned to the seventh district. The head town was at Zihuatanejo.

1996–2005

Under the 1996 districting plan, which allocated Guerrero ten districts, the district comprised the same seven municipalities as in the 2005 plan, with its head town at Zihuatanejo.

1978–1996

The districting scheme in force from 1978 to 1996 was the result of the 1977 electoral reforms, which increased the number of single-member seats in the Chamber of Deputies from 196 to 300. Under that plan, Guerrero's district allocation rose from six to ten. The 3rd district was located inland: it had its head town at Coyuca de Catalán and it covered the municipalities of Ajuchitlán del Progreso, Apaxtla, Coahuayutla, Coyuca de Catalán, General Heliodoro Castillo, Leonardo Bravo, Pungarabato, San Miguel Totolapan, Zirándaro and Zumpango del Río.

== Deputies returned to Congress ==
(Mexico) National parties
- Current
- PAN
- PRI
- PT
- PVEM
- MC
- Morena
- PAZ
- Somos
- Defunct or local only
- PLM
- PNR
- PRM
- PNM
- PP
- PPS
- PARM
- PFCRN
- CON
- PANAL
- PSD
- PES
- PES
- PRD

Guerrero's 3rd district
Election	Deputy	Party	Term	Legislature
1973	Alejandro Cervantes Delgado	Institutional Revolutionary Party	1973–1976	49th Congress
1976	Miguel Bello Pineda	Institutional Revolutionary Party	1976–1979	50th Congress
1979	Aristeo Roque Jaimes Núñez	Institutional Revolutionary Party	1979–1982	51st Congress
1982	Rafael Armenta Ortiz	Institutional Revolutionary Party	1982–1985	52nd Congress
1985	Alicia Buitrón Brugada	Institutional Revolutionary Party	1985–1988	53rd Congress
1988	Valdemar Soto Jaimes	Institutional Revolutionary Party	1988–1991	54th Congress
1991	Hugo Arce Norato	Institutional Revolutionary Party	1991–1994	55th Congress
1994	Netzahualcóyotl de la Vega	Institutional Revolutionary Party	1994–1997	56th Congress
1997	María de la Luz Núñez Ramos	Party of the Democratic Revolution	1997–2000	57th Congress
2000	Celestino Bailón Guerrero	Institutional Revolutionary Party	2000–2003	58th Congress
2003	Francisco Chavarría Valdeolívar	Party of the Democratic Revolution	2003–2006	59th Congress
2006	Amador Campos Aburto (Note: Campos Aburto took temporary leave of his seat on 1 August 2008 to contend (unsuccessfully) for the municipal presidency of José Azueta.); Secundino Catarino Crispín	Party of the Democratic Revolution	2006–2009; 2008	60th Congress
2009	Armando Ríos Piter (Note: Ríos Piter took temporary leave of his seat on 4 August 2010.); Elia Blanco Sánchez	Party of the Democratic Revolution	2009–2012; 2010	61st Congress
2012	Silvano Blanco Deaquino	Party of the Democratic Revolution	2012–2015	62nd Congress
2015	Ricardo Ángel Barrientos Ríos	Party of the Democratic Revolution	2015–2018	63rd Congress
2018	Carmen Cabrera Lagunas	National Regeneration Movement	2018–2021	64th Congress
2021	Luis Edgardo Palacios Díaz	Ecologist Green Party of Mexico	2021–2024	65th Congress
2024	Ma. del Carmen Cabrera Lagunas	Ecologist Green Party of Mexico	2024–2027	66th Congress

== Presidential elections ==
Guerrero's 3rd district
Election	District won by	Party or coalition	%
2018	Andrés Manuel López Obrador	Juntos Haremos Historia	66.5158
2024	Claudia Sheinbaum Pardo	Sigamos Haciendo Historia	76.8875
