= Tropical Storm Lester (2022) =

Eastern Pacific tropical storm in September 2022

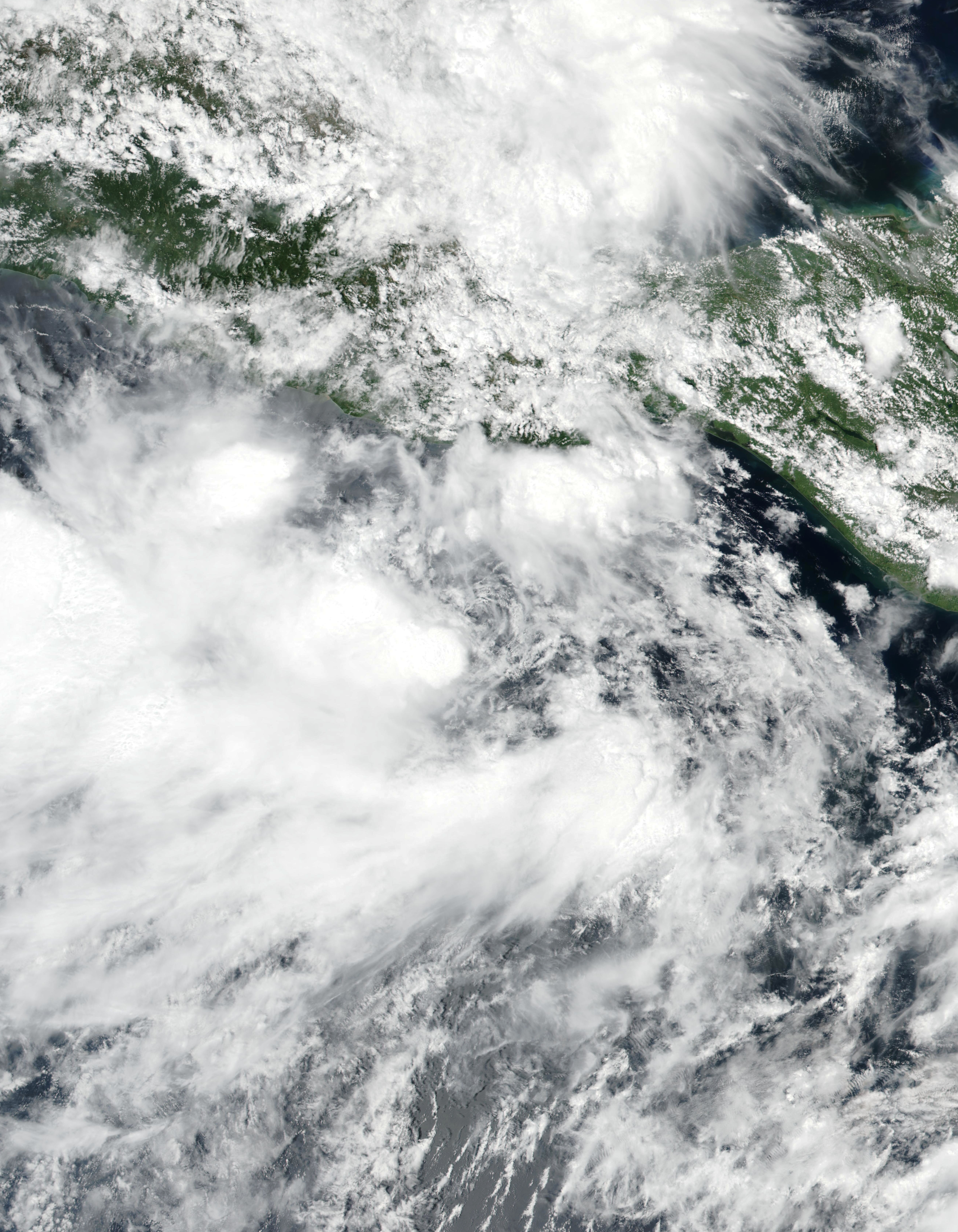
- Tropical Storm Lester near the coast of southern Mexico on September 16, 2022

Meteorological history
- Formed: September 15, 2022
- Dissipated: September 17, 2022

Tropical storm
- 1-minute sustained (SSHWS/NWS)
- Highest winds: 40 mph (65 km/h)
- Lowest pressure: 1005 mbar (hPa); 29.68 inHg

Overall effects
- Fatalities: 5 total
- Damage: Unknown
- Areas affected: Southern Mexico
- Part of the 2022 Pacific hurricane season

Tropical Storm Lester was a short-lived tropical cyclone that caused severe rainfall and flash flooding in southern Mexico in September 2022. The thirteenth named storm of the 2022 Pacific hurricane season, Lester developed from an area of disturbed weather that formed offshore the Pacific Coast of Mexico on September 13. The disturbance spawned an area of low pressure two days later, which quickly organized into a tropical depression at 18:00 UTC (Note: All times are in Universal Time Coordinated, unless otherwise noted) on September 15. Moving slowly northwestward, the depression strengthened into Tropical Storm Lester the following morning.

Despite being located over very warm sea surface temperatures and in a moist environment, Lester was unable to intensify further and remained a minimal tropical storm as it slowly approached the coast of Mexico, due to moderately strong wind shear. Lester made landfall near Punta Maldonado in extreme southwestern Guerrero as a tropical depression around 12:00 UTC on September 17. The cyclone quickly dissipated over the rough terrain of Mexico later that day.

Lester caused significant flooding in southern Mexico, with rainfall peaking at 14.31 in (363 mm) in Coyuca de Benítez in Guerrero. Flooding damaged over 700 homes in Guerrero, and several vehicles and roadways were trapped by flooding and debris in Oaxaca. A fisherman died in Guerrero due to large waves from Lester capsizing his boat off the coast of the town of La Bocana. An additional four deaths occurred in the state due to severe flooding. Heavy rainfall from Lester extended as far north as Colima and Nayarit, with over 70 families' homes experiencing damage in the former state.

== Meteorological history ==
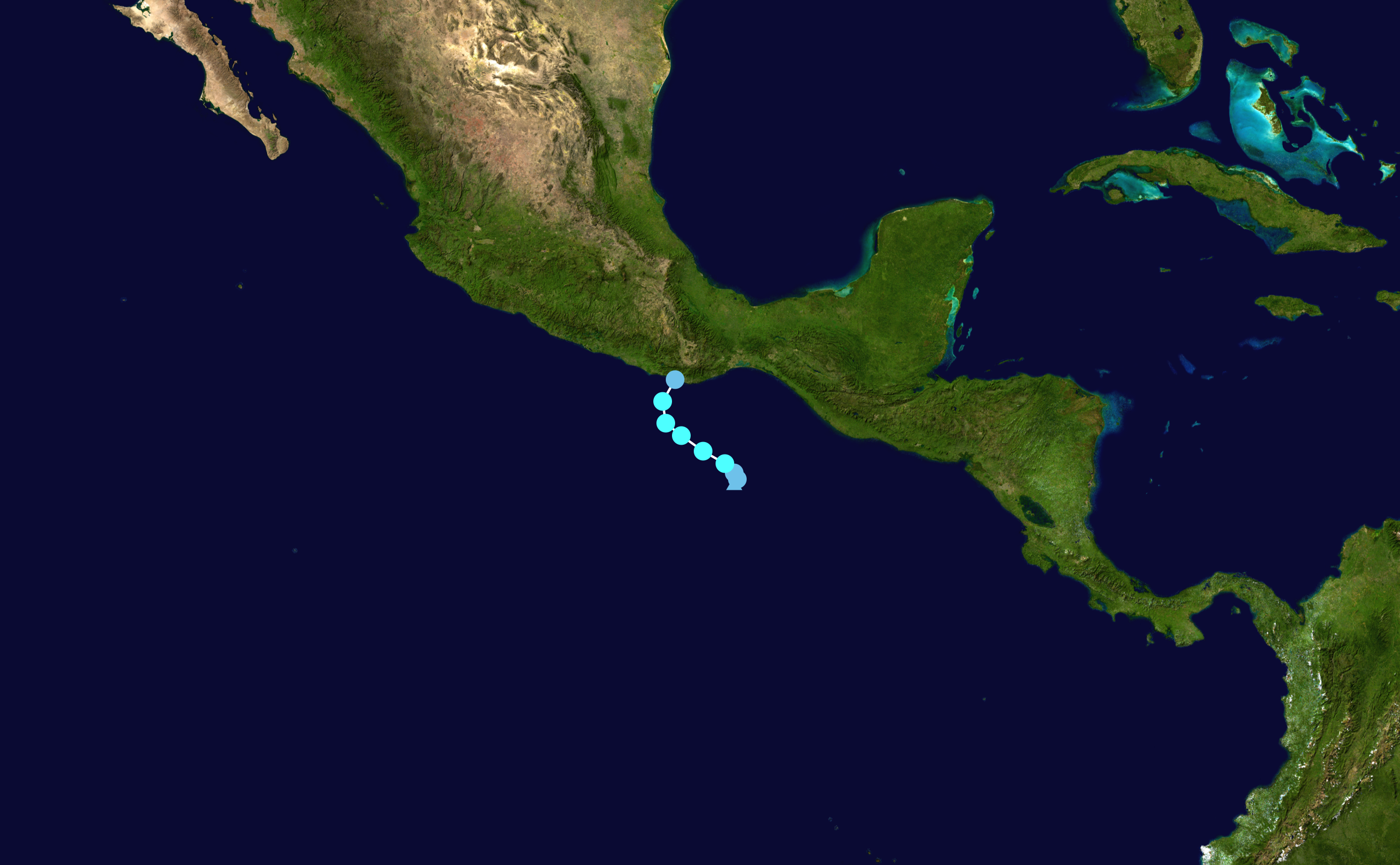
Map plotting the storm's track and intensity, according to the Saffir–Simpson scale Map key Saffir–Simpson scale Tropical depression (≤38 mph, ≤62 km/h) Tropical storm (39–73 mph, 63–118 km/h) Category 1 (74–95 mph, 119–153 km/h) Category 2 (96–110 mph, 154–177 km/h) Category 3 (111–129 mph, 178–208 km/h) Category 4 (130–156 mph, 209–251 km/h) Category 5 (≥157 mph, ≥252 km/h) Unknown Storm type Tropical cyclone Subtropical cyclone Extratropical cyclone, remnant low, tropical disturbance, or monsoon depression

An area of disturbed weather, characterized by sporadic convection, developed several hundred miles south of Mexico on September 13, along the monsoon trough. The disturbance's convection began to gradually organize the following day and developed a cyclonic circulation, though it remained elongated and was not very defined. A convective burst early on September 15 allowed the system to develop into an area of low pressure by 12:00 UTC that day. The system continued to organize and developed a curved convective band around the western portion of its cyclonic circulation. This led to the formation of Tropical Depression Thirteen-E by 18:00 UTC, about 230 mi (370 km) southeast of Puerto Ángel, Oaxaca. Located in weak steering currents, the depression meandered to the northwest overnight, strengthening into a tropical storm at 06:00 UTC the following day and receiving the name Lester from the United States-based National Hurricane Center (NHC). Lester reached peak intensity when it strengthened into a tropical storm, with maximum sustained winds of 40 mph (65 km/h) and a minimum barometric pressure of 1,005 mbar (29.7 inHg).

Despite reaching tropical storm strength, Lester still maintained a sheared appearance due to moderate wind shear from the northeast. Lester continued moving to the northwest at a slow pace, between a cyclonic gyre to its west and a ridge to its northeast over the U.S. state of Texas. Despite initial forecasts of strengthening, Lester remained a weak tropical cyclone due to continuous wind shear. The storm's structure was disheveled, with most of Lester's limited convection located south of its low-level circulation center. An increase in shear later on September 16 caused the system to weaken. Nearing the coast of the state of Oaxaca, Lester weakened to a tropical depression on September 17 just offshore. Lester made landfall around 12:00 UTC that day over extreme southwestern Guerrero, near Punta Maldonado, to the northwest of Puerto Escondido, Oaxaca, with sustained winds of 35 mph (55 km/h). Lester's circulation rapidly unraveled as it interacted with the mountainous terrain of southern Mexico, and the cyclone dissipated completely over Guerrero later that day.

== Preparations ==
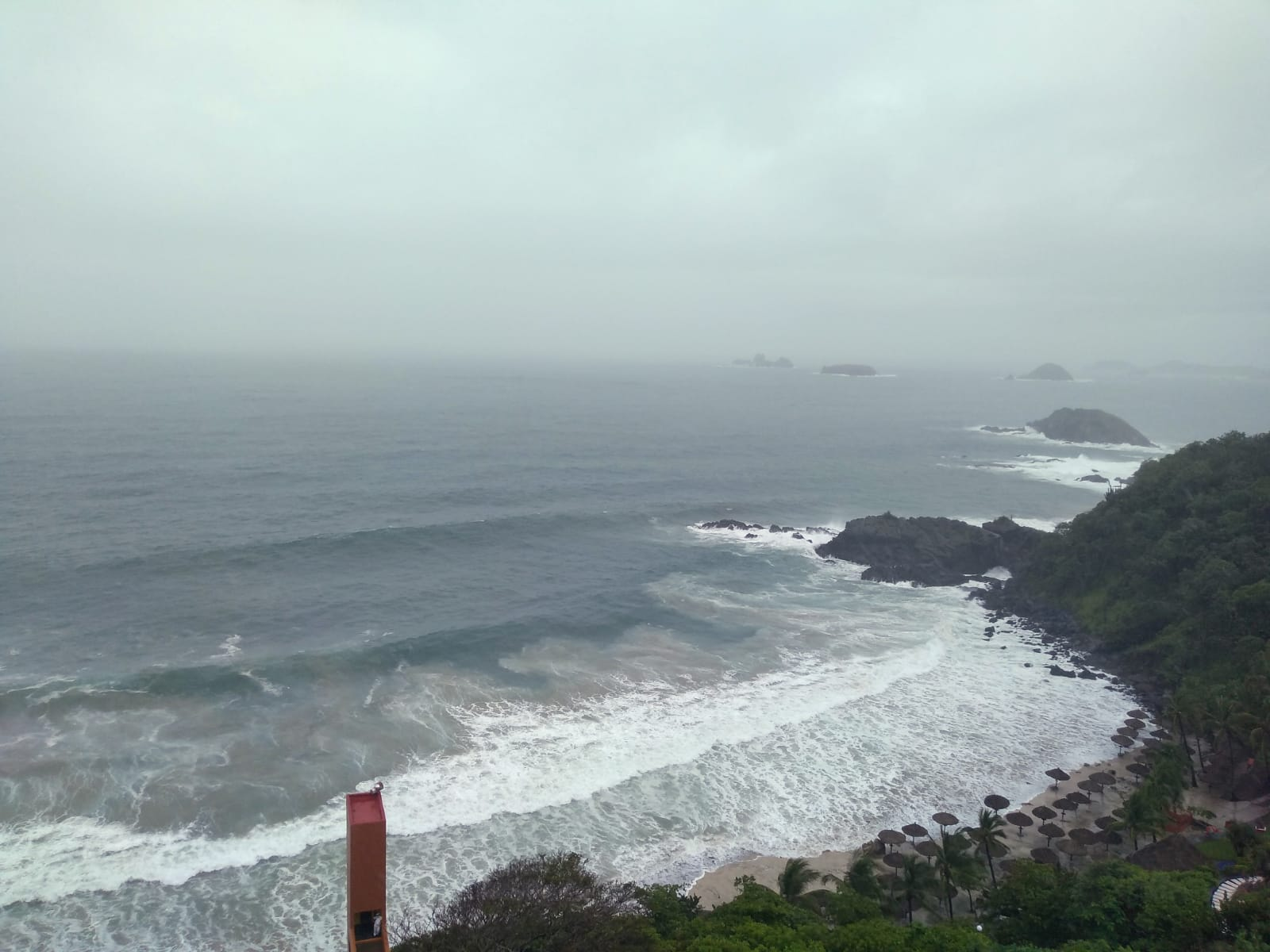
High surf off the coast of Playa Hermosa, a beach in San Blas, Nayarit, in September 2022 due to Tropical Storm Lester

Numerous tropical storm watches and warnings were issued in advance of Lester's landfall on Mexico. The Mexican government warned of the potential for heavy rainfall, strong winds and high waves in the states of Guerrero and Oaxaca in advance of the cyclone. Lesser rainfall was also forecast for the states of Puebla and Morelos. Ports across Guerrero were closed due to high waves of up to 13 ft (4.0 m) generated by Lester. Nearly 600 emergency shelters were opened in advance of the storm. Local residents were warned of the imminent threat of heavy rains, as well as rivers and streams overflowing their banks. 14 flights between various airports in Guerrero and Mexico City International Airport were cancelled in advance of the storm. Over 650 temporary storm shelters were erected across Guerrero, including 80 in Acapulco and eight in the state capital of Chilpancingo. The State Civil Protection Coordination of Michoacán placed 33 of its municipalities on alert for heavy rainfall and landslides in advance of Lester. The state's civil protection authorities placed personnel on standby to assist residents affected by the storm.

== Impact and aftermath ==
Rainfall from Lester peaked at 14.31 in (363 mm) in Coyuca de Benítez, Guerrero. A total of 777 flooded homes and 17 landslides cutting off roads were recorded across the state. The vast majority of the flooding was centered in the municipality of Coyuca de Benítez, where 706 flooded homes were reported. Damage was recorded across 17 of Guerrero's municipalities, and widespread flooding and overflowing of rivers occurred. A landslide occurred on a federal highway connecting the major cities of Acapulco and Mexico City, blocking off two lanes of traffic; heavy rainfall occurred for several hours in the former.

Three people were injured during the storm's passage, including one that required hospitalization, and fifteen others had to be rescued from rising flood waters. An overflowing river impacted 150 families in the state, and an additional 78 families were impacted in the municipalities of Benito Juárez and El Dorado. Four people across Guerrero died after being swept away by flood waters due to Lester. An additional death occurred when a fisherman drowned offshore due to high waves generated by the storm. Federal authorities carried out removal of debris from blocked roads, in coordination with the state and municipal governments of Guerrero.

At least 12 municipalities in Oaxaca suffered damage from Lester's passage. Severe flooding, landslides and river runoff were all reported following the storm's landfall just west of the state border with Guerrero, particularly in the municipalities of Santa María Tonameca, San Pedro Pochutla, Candelaria Loxicha and Pluma Hidalgo. State authorities in Oaxaca requested an emergency declaration for over a dozen coastal municipalities impacted by Lester from the Mexican federal government. The federal government activated Plan DN-III-E to help families affected by the storm. Over 500 members of the Mexican army were deployed to help remove branches and debris, clear up roads and free vehicles from overflowing rivers. Two temporary storm shelters were set up to provide food, clothing and medical aid.

Heavy rainfall from Lester was reported further north in Colima. At least 70 families suffered damage to their homes in the municipality of Tecomán, while additional flooding and destruction was reported in the city of Manzanillo. In Nayarit, Lester caused numerous rivers to overflow their banks. Six cars were swept into the sea by a rip current in the municipality of Sayulita. A buildup of stagnant water occurred in the town of Bucerías, which had to be cleared by municipal authorities.

== See also ==
- Weather of 2022
- Tropical cyclones in 2022
- List of Eastern Pacific tropical storms
- Other storms named Lester
- Tropical Storm Beatriz (2017) – Followed a similar path and impacted similar areas
- Tropical Storm Vicente (2018) – Also made landfall in southern Mexico as a tropical depression
- Tropical Storm Max (2023) – Also made landfall in Guerrero and impacted similar areas
