= Tropical Storm Hernan (2020) =

Eastern Pacific tropical storm in 2020

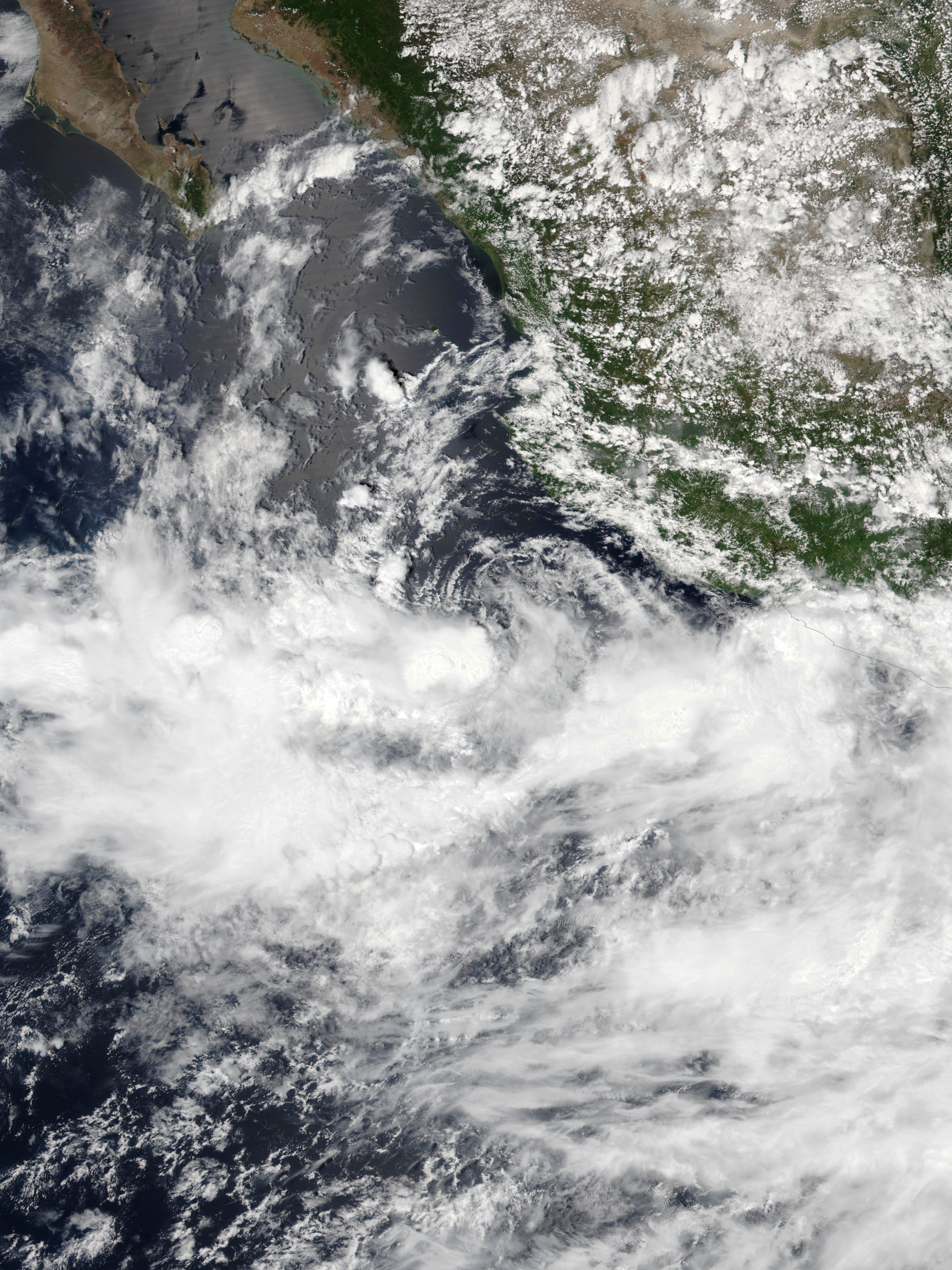
- Tropical Storm Hernan just offshore of southwestern Mexico on August 26, 2020

Meteorological history
- Formed: August 26, 2020
- Dissipated: August 28, 2020

Tropical storm
- 1-minute sustained (SSHWS/NWS)
- Highest winds: 45 mph (75 km/h)
- Lowest pressure: 1001 mbar (hPa); 29.56 inHg

Overall effects
- Fatalities: 1 indirect
- Missing: 1
- Damage: $51.4 million (2020 USD)
- Areas affected: Southwestern Mexico
- IBTrACS /
- Part of the 2020 Pacific hurricane season

Tropical Storm Hernan was a short-lived tropical cyclone that brought widespread flooding and destructive mudslides to southwestern Mexico in late August 2020. Hernan was the thirteenth tropical cyclone and eighth named storm (Note: This figure excludes an unnamed tropical storm that formed in July 2020.) of the 2020 Pacific hurricane season. The system developed from a low-pressure area to the southwest of Mexico on August 26, as a low-end tropical storm. Moving generally northward and paralleling the west coast of Mexico, Hernan was hindered by a high wind shear environment and only slightly strengthened. The cyclone achieved its peak intensity around 06:00 UTC on August 27 with maximum sustained winds of 70 km/h (45 mph) and a minimum barometric pressure of 1,001 mbar (29.6 inHg). Passing just offshore of the state of Jalisco, Hernan turned west and degenerated to a remnant low on August 28. The low passed near the southern tip of the Baja California Peninsula later that day and dissipated shortly thereafter.

Despite Hernan's short existence, it dropped more than 280 millimeters (11 inches) of rain across many areas of southwestern Mexico, with accumulations peaking at 590 mm (23.24 in) in Jalisco. Multiple highways had to be shut down due to dangerous conditions, including mudslides and rivers overflowing their banks. Several schools suffered damage in the state of Colima, and in the city of Manzanillo, homes, businesses, and streets were damaged and covered in mud. Nearly 20,000 people were greatly affected by Hernan in Jalisco, and 1,674 houses and 9 schools suffered severe damage. In that state, a man fell off his roof and died while inspecting it for damage following the storm. Severe damage was also reported in Guerrero, with the most significant flooding taking place in the Costa Grande region. Lesser effects of the storm were felt in several other coastal states across western Mexico. Recovery efforts were undertaken by the Mexican Armed Forces across several states. Total damage in Mexico was calculated at Mex$1.1 billion (US$51.4 million). (Note: All currencies are in their 2020 values and are converted to United States dollars using data from the International Monetary Fund published by the World Bank.)

== Meteorological history ==
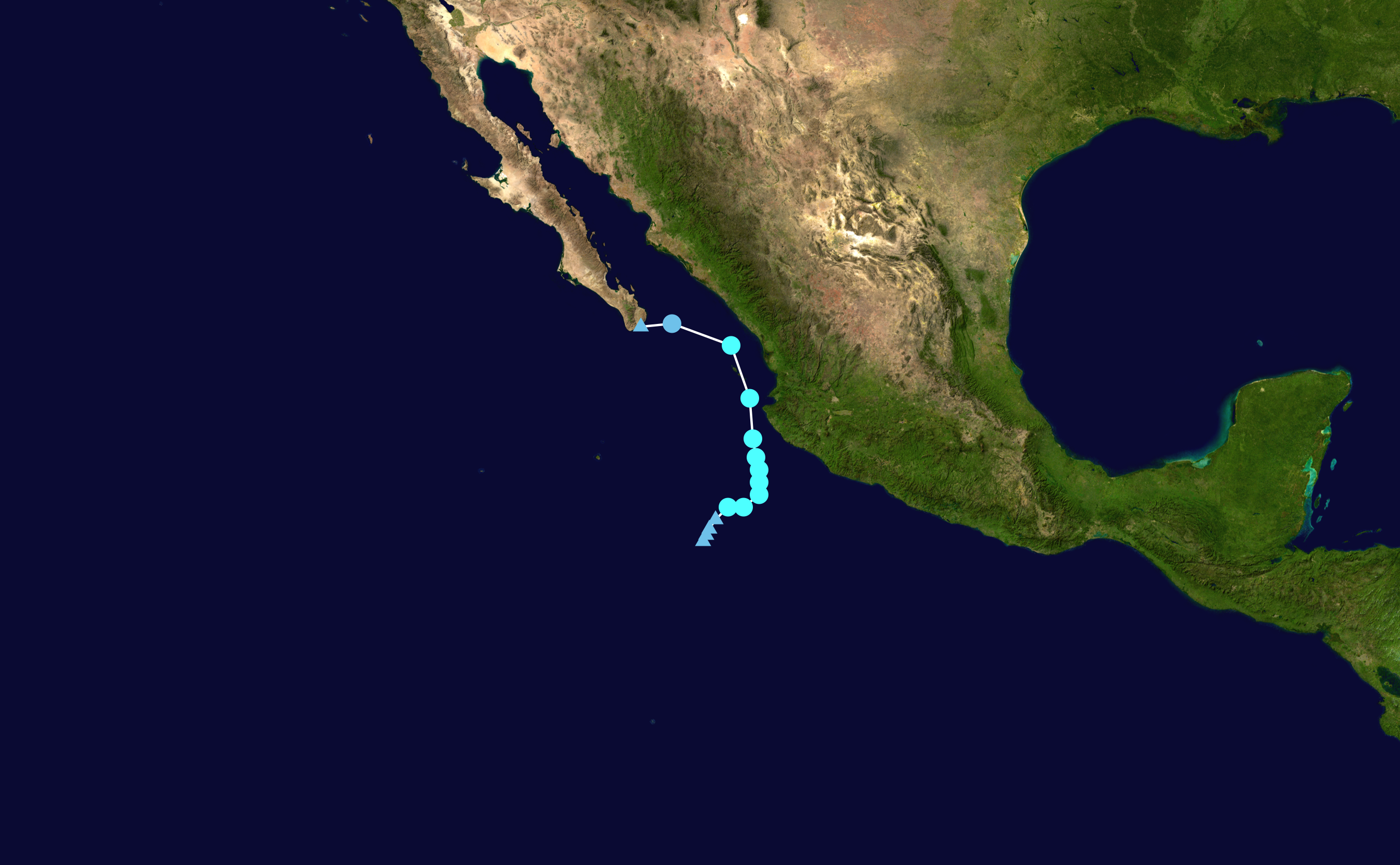
Map plotting the storm's track and intensity, according to the Saffir–Simpson scale Map key Saffir–Simpson scale Tropical depression (≤38 mph, ≤62 km/h) Tropical storm (39–73 mph, 63–118 km/h) Category 1 (74–95 mph, 119–153 km/h) Category 2 (96–110 mph, 154–177 km/h) Category 3 (111–129 mph, 178–208 km/h) Category 4 (130–156 mph, 209–251 km/h) Category 5 (≥157 mph, ≥252 km/h) Unknown Storm type Tropical cyclone Subtropical cyclone Extratropical cyclone, remnant low, tropical disturbance, or monsoon depression

In late August 2020, the monsoon trough over the Eastern Pacific tropical cyclone basin became active, following the passage of Hurricane Genevieve. As Genevieve weakened west of the Baja California Peninsula, the monsoon trough, aided by a pulse of the Madden–Julian oscillation, developed three separate areas of low pressure. One of the lows formed on August 21, to the southwest of mainland Mexico. The low moved slowly eastward, initially unable to organize its convective (shower and thunderstorm) activity due to its large size. However, beginning on August 24, the low and its associated shower and thunderstorm activity began to slowly become better organized and defined within marginally favorable conditions for tropical cyclogenesis. After developing a cyclonic circulation and gale-force winds on August 26, the low became a tropical storm around 06:00 UTC that day, about 545 kilometers (340 miles) southwest of the municipality of Cabo Corrientes. However, the United States-based National Hurricane Center (NHC) operationally (Note: "Operationally" refers to the real-time NHC forecasts on Hernan, prior to post-season analysis of the storm.) did not recognize the system as having reached tropical storm strength until 21:00 UTC that day, at which time it was named Hernan. Upon naming Hernan, the NHC noted that the storm was also located on the eastern side of a broad monsoon gyre, causing it to move in an eastward-to-northward fashion. Additionally, the system was facing strong easterly wind shear (Note: Vertical wind shear is the presence of divergent wind directions and speeds in different levels of the atmosphere. It can negatively impact the development and strengthening of tropical cyclones.) and was slightly elongated from northeast to southwest, inhibiting potential strengthening.

Despite these unfavorable conditions, cloud tops south and west of Hernan's center cooled to between −83 and −86 °C (−117 and −123 °F) as its convection increased, allowing the cyclone to strengthen slightly. Hernan achieved peak intensity at 06:00 UTC on August 27 with maximum sustained winds of 70 km/h (45 mph) and a minimum barometric pressure of 1,001 mbar (29.6 inHg). Continuous wind shear caused Hernan to weaken shortly thereafter, restricting convection to the western portion of the storm's circulation. Continuing to move counterclockwise around the monsoon gyre, Hernan passed over the Gulf of California and turned to the west early on August 28. The system weakened to a tropical depression at 12:00 UTC that day as most of its associated convection dissipated. Hernan degenerated to a remnant low six hours later just off the southern coast of Baja California Sur. The remnants of Hernan continued westward around the gyre, which contained Tropical Storm Iselle, another tropical cyclone located to the south. By 00:00 UTC on August 29, the remnants of Hernan were completely absorbed by the gyre.

== Preparations, impact and aftermath ==
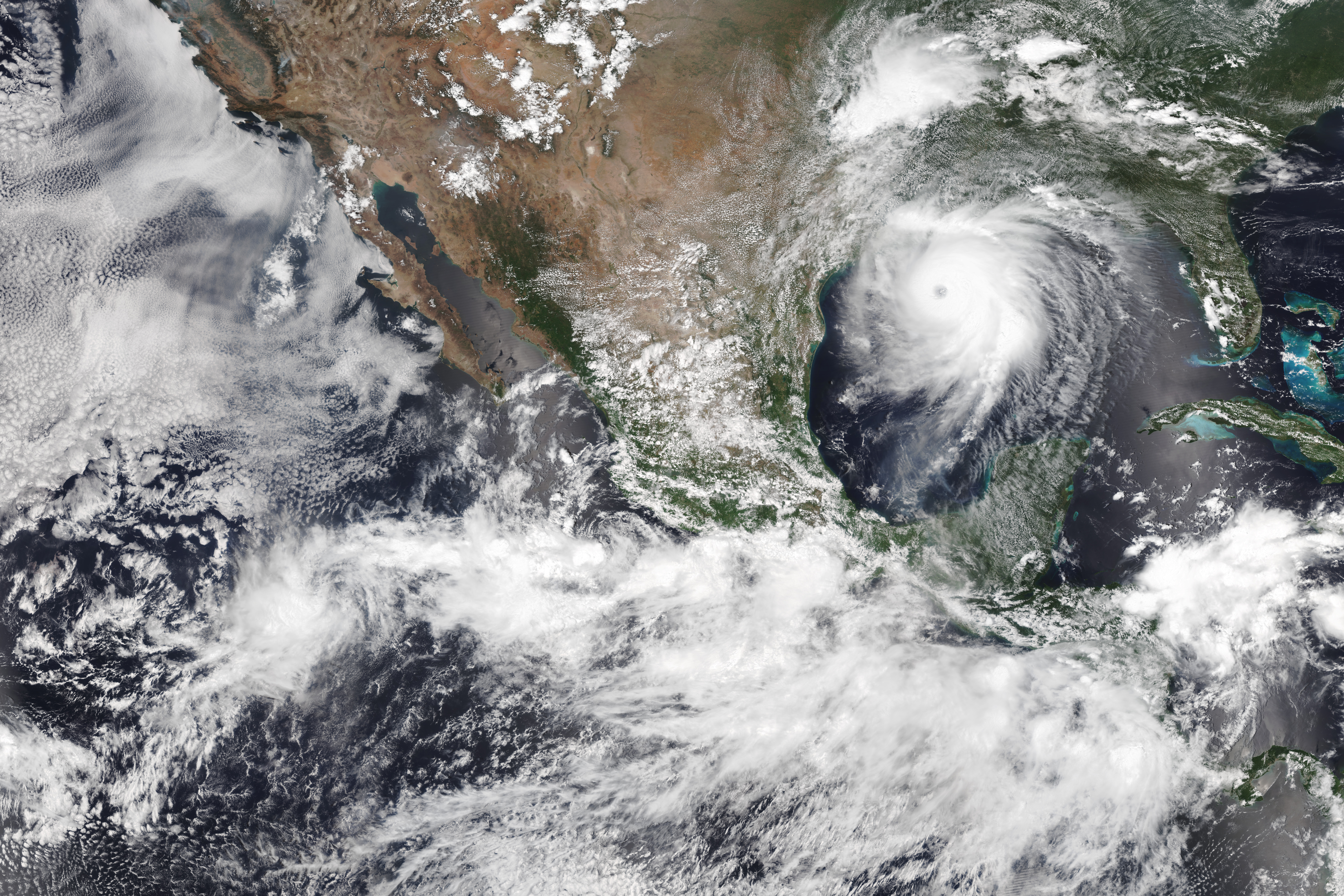
Tropical Storm Hernan near the Mexican coast on August 26, with Tropical Storm Iselle to the west, the prominent ITCZ to the south, and Atlantic Hurricane Laura to the east, in the Gulf of Mexico

No tropical storm watches or warnings were issued in advance of Hernan despite its close proximity to land. However, over 400 people were evacuated ahead of the storm in the states of Jalisco and Colima due to anticipated flooding. A total of 30 people were evacuated in high-risk areas in the city of Manzanillo in the latter state. Another 211 residents were evacuated to six shelters across Guerrero.

Approximately 97,000 people across Colima, Michoacán, and Jalisco lost electricity due to Hernan. At least seven people across the coast were rescued by air following inundation of their houses by flood waters. Over 250 state and federal workers were dispatched to areas affected by Hernan, while workers from different agencies traveled by helicopter to bring food and supplies. Secretary of the Navy José Rafael Ojeda Durán implemented the Mexican Navy's Marine Plan, under which naval personnel carried out the evacuation of people trapped by flooding, removed debris, cleaned beaches, and transferred food and equipment to victims of the storm. Over 450 units (vehicles) of army machinery were used to carry out the Marine Plan: 60 maritime units, 6 aircraft, and 391 land units.

=== Jalisco ===
Rainfall in Jalisco peaked at 590 mm (23.24 in) in Cihuatlán and 512 mm (20.16 in) in Apazulco during August 26–28. At least 630 houses and 9 schools experienced severe damage in the state. Torrential rains and landslides affected coastal areas of Jalisco, including the resort city of Puerto Vallarta, where the Ameca River flooded, and forced the closure of the San Sebastián del Oeste-Mascota highway. The severe flooding prompted the closure of five federal highways between Jalisco and the neighboring states of Colima and Nayarit. Heavy rains left 30 communities in Jalisco without power; 18 people took shelter on their roofs during the flooding and had to be rescued by armed forces members. Landslides and mudslides covered parts of federal highways 80 and 200 and required clearing by federal workers. In the towns of Melaque and La Manzanilla, heavy flooding caused the nearby Cuixmala River to overflow, while rising waters in the El Pedregal stream led to flooding that prompted the opening of three temporary storm shelters in Jaluco and Melaque. Citizens in Melaque had to travel by boat to navigate flooded streets. Severe flooding of homes and roads in Cihuatlán and La Huerta prompted the opening of four temporary shelters in the former municipality, which held 365 displaced residents. 250 homes were damaged in Cihuatlán, while another 228 were damaged in La Huerta. A man died in La Huerta when he fell from his roof while checking for damage from Hernan. Over 350 people from Cihuatlán and Tomatlán had to be transferred to temporary storm shelters. Damage in Jalisco amounted to Mex$470 million (US$21.9 million).

At least 19,968 people were impacted and in need of support across Jalisco following Hernan. The Jalisco State Emergency Committee declared states of emergency in the municipalities of Tomatlán, Casimiro Castillo, Cihuatlán, La Huerta, Villa Purificación, Cabo Corrientes and Cuautitlán de García Barragán after the passage of the cyclone. Resources from both the federal government's Fondo Nacional de Desastres Naturales (National Fund for Natural Disasters) and Jalisco's Fondo Estatal de Desastres Naturales (State Fund for Natural Disasters) were given to the seven aforementioned municipalities. Food pantries, mats, hygiene kits, and water were among the supplies given to the residents of 1,674 damaged homes. The federal legislature requested that the Comisión Nacional del Agua (National Water Commission) carry out studies and take further preventive actions to address the lack of storm-resistant infrastructure in many coastal municipalities of Jalisco.

=== Colima ===
Torrential rainfall from Hernan led to numerous rivers overflowing their banks across Colima, which resulted in severe and widespread flooding across coastal portions of the state. Structures and roadways along the coast saw serious damage as roofs collapsed and flood waters swept away cars, toppled trees, knocked over power lines, and battered buildings. Waves of up to 4 meters (13 feet) occurred off the coasts of Manzanillo, Tecomán, and Armería. Several schools were affected by Hernan's passage, experiencing flooding, leaks, and fallen tree branches, though none suffered serious damage. A parota tree blocked a road in the town of Tamala in the municipality of Ixtlahuacán, and residents across the area were advised to stay home by local government authorities during the storm's passage.

Flooding was particularly heavy in the city of Manzanillo; rainfall in the city peaked at 398 mm (15.65 in). Hundreds of homes, businesses, and streets were covered in mud, and several roads collapsed or were rendered impassable immediately following Hernan's passage. The president of Manzanillo's Planning and Tourism Commission, Luis Rogelio Salinas Sánchez, stated that both urban and rural areas around Manzanillo were severely affected by the storm. Torrential rain fell across the area, and strong rip currents occurred along the city's beachfront. Sand and debris were stirred up throughout the streets of Manzanillo by strong winds as Hernan passed offshore. Civil protection authorities carried out damage assessments statewide following the storm.

=== Guerrero ===
Destructive rains from Hernan and its precursor spread into Guerrero in conjunction with the Intertropical Convergence Zone (ITCZ), a large area of converging thunderstorms, for several days in late August. The combined effects of the weather systems caused at least 300 mm (12 in) of rainfall along the coastline of the state during August 26–28. The most serious damage occurred in the Costa Grande region, mostly due to the overflowing of rivers in Zihuatanejo, La Unión, Coahuayutla, San Jerónimo, Coyuca de Benítez and Petatlán, with over 100 houses experiencing damage in the last city. Over 400 houses were damaged in the town of Hacienda de Cabañas, where there were initial reports of a missing person due to the storm. A resident of the municipality of Cacalutla had to be rescued after being washed into an overflowing river. The large port city of Acapulco experienced heavy rains, falling trees, and several landslides. Severe damage occurred along Cayaquitos beach, where garbage, debris and animal corpses were washed up. Wind gusts and torrential rainfall tore the roofs off of businesses. In the municipality of Juxtlahuaca, located on the border of Guerrero and Oaxaca, the Mixteco River overflowed its banks, inundating homes nearby. Secretary Ojeda Durán activated Plan DN-III-E to provide aid to individuals affected by Hernan in Guerrero and Oaxaca, and sent military personnel to the states to assist in recovery and cleanup efforts. The storm caused Mex$634 million (US$29.5 million) in damage to the state.

=== Elsewhere ===
Disruptions and flash flooding were occurred in Michoacán, with over 100 homes suffering damage in the town of El Bejuco in that state. Up to 600,000 sea turtle eggs in Ixtapilla Marine Turtle Sanctuary in Michoacán were swept away or destroyed by Hernan, including those of the threatened Olive Ridley turtle, making for a large environmental loss. Flooding, hail, minor mudslides, and debris were reported in southern coastal areas of the state of Sinaloa. The city of Mazatlán closed its port and beaches on August 28 due to hostile weather conditions from Hernan. Flooding occurred along the coast of Bahía de Banderas and in the city of San Blas in Nayarit, and rainfall across the state exceeded 200 mm (8 in). A mudslide occurred near a populated neighborhood in the city of Xalisco, though no serious damage resulted.

== See also ==
- Weather of 2020
- Tropical cyclones in 2020
- List of Eastern Pacific tropical storms
- Other storms named Hernan
