= Rubén Figueroa =

Rubén Figueroa may refer to:

- Rubén Figueroa Figueroa (1908–1991), Mexican politician, governor of Guerrero from 1975 to 1981
- Rubén Figueroa Alcocer (born 1939), Mexican politician, governor of Guerrero from 1993 to 1996
- Rubén Figueroa Smutny (born 1967), Mexican politician, federal deputy from 2003 to 2006
