= Rubén Figueroa Alcocer =

Mexican politician, governor of Guerrero

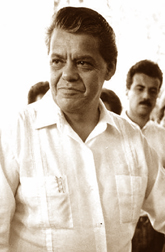

Governor of Guerrero
- In office 1 April 1993 – 12 March 1996
- Preceded by: José Francisco Ruiz Massieu
- Succeeded by: Ángel Aguirre Rivero

Senator for Guerrero
- In office 1991–1992

Federal deputy for Guerrero's 10th
- In office 1988–1991

Federal deputy for the Federal District's 17th
- In office 1979–1982

Personal details
- Born: 4 December 1939 (age 86) Huitzuco, Guerrero, Mexico
- Party: PRI
- Occupation: Politician

Rubén Figueroa Alcocer (born 4 December 1939) is a Mexican politician affiliated with the Institutional Revolutionary Party (PRI). He has served in both chambers of Congress and was governor of Guerrero from 1993 to 1996.

== Career ==
Figueroa Alcocer was born in Huitzuco, Guerrero, in 1939. (Note: Huitzuco was renamed Huitzuco de los Figueroa on 1 April 1942 "in recognition of the [Figueroa] family and the role they played in the Mexican Revolution" of 1910–1920.) In 1957 he enrolled in the National Autonomous University of Mexico (UNAM), from where he graduated with a degree in law. He began his political career in 1960.

In the 1979 mid-terms he was elected to the Chamber of Deputies to represent the Federal District's 17th congressional district (1979–1982). He ran again for Congress in the 1988 general election and served another three-year term (1988–1991) representing Guerrero's 10th district.

He was elected to the Senate for the state of Guerrero in the 1991 election. In mid-1992, however, he took leave of his Senate seat to seek election as governor of Guerrero for the 1993–1999 term. He was announced the winner of the 7 February 1993 election and was sworn in as governor on 1 April. His opponent, Félix Salgado Macedonio of the Party of the Democratic Revolution (PRD), alleged fraud and his supporters occupied the esplanade in front of the government palace in Chilpancingo until the following July.

On 28 June 1995, in the coastal municipality of Coyuca de Benítez, 17 campesinos were killed by Guerrero state police in the Aguas Blancas massacre. On 12 March 1996, Figueroa Alcocer presented the Congress of Guerrero with his resignation from the governorship "to facilitate the investigation of the incident" by the Supreme Court of Justice of the Nation. He was replaced for the remainder of his term by Ángel Aguirre Rivero.

== Personal life ==
Figueroa Alcocer's father was Rubén Figueroa Figueroa (1908–1991), who served as governor of Guerrero from 1975 to 1981. His son, Rubén Figueroa Smutny, is a former federal deputy.
