= Aguas Blancas massacre =

1995 massacre in Mexico

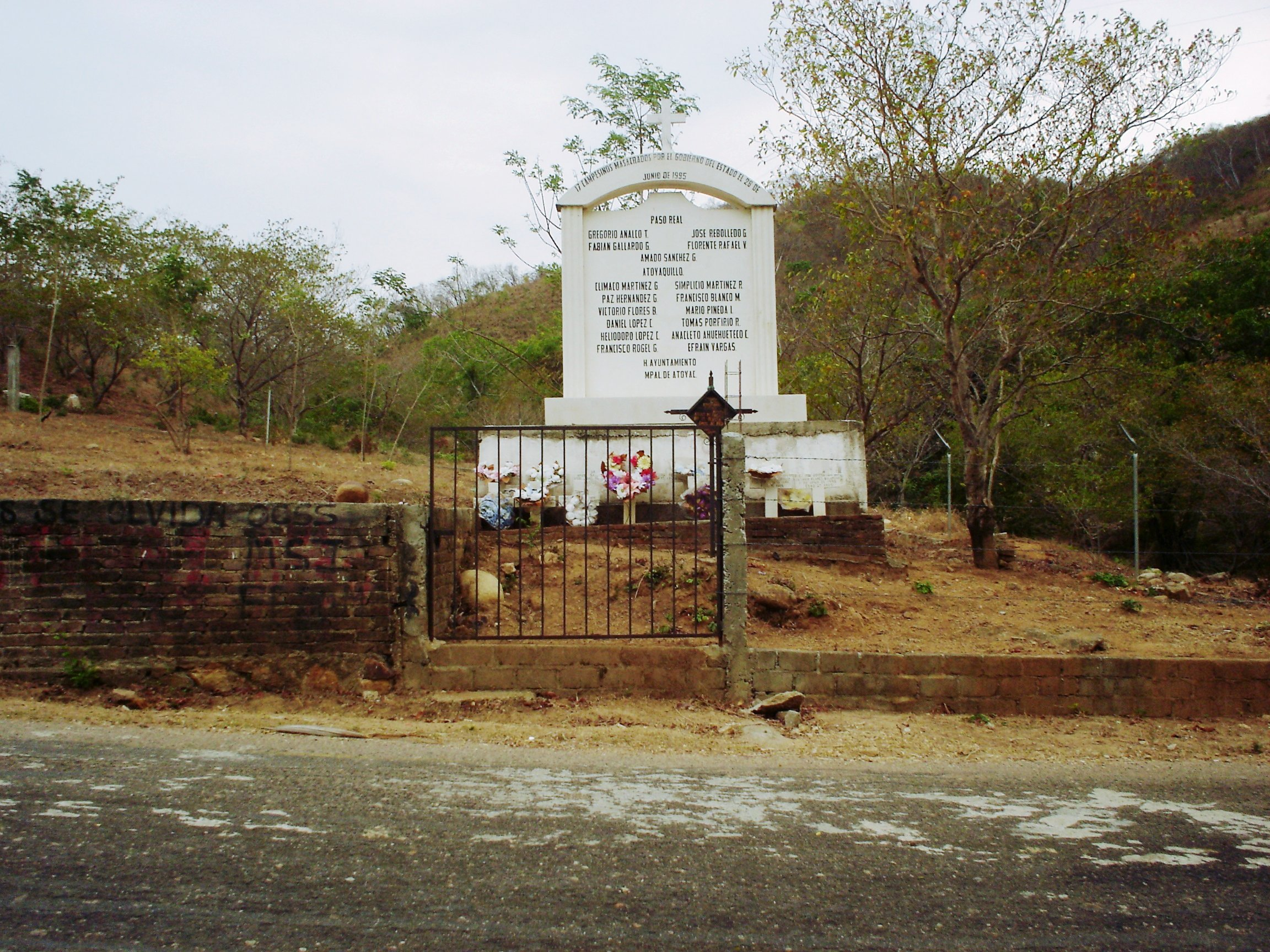
- Monument in Aguas Blancas, Guerrero.
- Location: 17.028486°N 100.078488°W; Aguas Blancas, Coyuca de Benítez, Guerrero
- Date: 28 June 1995
- Target: Members of the Organización Campesina de la Sierra Sur
- Attack type: Shooting
- Deaths: 17
- Injuries: 21
- Perpetrator: Mexican police

The Aguas Blancas Massacre was a massacre that took place on 28 June 1995, in the municipality of Coyuca de Benítez, Guerrero, Mexico, in which, according to the official version, 17 farmers were killed and 21 injured. Members of the Organización Campesina de la Sierra Sur (South Mountain Range Farmer Organization) were en route to Atoyac de Álvarez to attend a protest march demanding the release of Gilberto Romero Vázquez, a peasant activist arrested more than a month before (and who has never appeared since). They were also marching to demand drinking water, schools, hospitals and roads, among other things. According to survivors, they were ambushed by the motorized police and several were shot point blank. Some of the events were captured on film, by the police themselves. Weapons were subsequently placed in the dead farmers' hands and the police said they acted in self-defense.

One of the results of this incident was the creation of the Popular Revolutionary Army, a leftist guerrilla organization.

== Planning of the massacre ==
Allegedly, the Guerrero secretary of government, José Rubén Robles Catalán, and Gustavo Olea Godoy, head of the state police, were waiting in a helicopter some meters away, and took off when the first shot was fired. Governor of Guerrero Rubén Figueroa Alcocer had previously had a conversation with María de la Luz Núñez Ramos, the municipal president of Atoyac de Álvarez, saying measures had been taken so that the group would not reach Atoyac and that they would stop them by whatever means necessary. After the massacre he had another conversation with her, saying "They came for war, and war they got. Are we, or are we not the authority?". In spite of his initial defense of the police's actions, Figueroa Alcocer ended up resigning as governor of Guerrero on 12 March 1996.

== See also ==
- Human rights in Mexico
