= Aburto =

Aburto is a surname. Notable people with the surname include:

- Amador Campos Aburto (born 1951), Mexican politician
- Cristóbal Aburto (born 1975), Mexican judoka
- Fátima Aburto Baselga (born 1949), Spanish physician and politician
- Jeimmy Aburto (born 1994), Guatemalan model and beauty pageant titleholder
- Mario Aburto Martínez (born 1971), Mexican assassin
- Rafael Aburto (1913–2014), Spanish architect
