= Héctor Vicario Castrejón =

Mexican politician

- Born: 23 March 1962 (age 64); Huitzuco de los Figueroa, Guerrero, Mexico
- Occupation: Politician
- Political party: PRI

Héctor Vicario Castrejón (born 23 March 1962) is a Mexican politician affiliated with the Institutional Revolutionary Party (PRI).

In the 2000 general election he was elected to the Senate to represent the state of Guerrero during the 58th and 59th sessions of Congress (2000–2006). He had previously been elected to the Chamber of Deputies in the 1997 mid-terms, to represent Guerrero's fourth district during the 57th Congress (1997–2000).
