= Tropidodipsas papavericola =

Scientific classification
- Kingdom: Animalia
- Phylum: Chordata
- Class: Reptilia
- Order: Squamata
- Suborder: Serpentes
- Family: Colubridae
- Genus: Tropidodipsas
- Species: T. papavericola

Binomial name
- Tropidodipsas papavericola Grünwald, Toribio-Jiménez, Montaño-Ruvalcaba, Franz-Chávez, Peñaloza-Montaño, Barrera-Nava, J.M. Jones, C.M. Rodriguez, I. Hughes, Strickland & Reyes-Velasco, 2021

Species of snake

Tropidodipsas papavericola, the poppyfield snailsucker, is a species of snake in the family, Colubridae. Formally described in 2021, it is named after its habit of living among poppy plants. Endemic to Mexico, it is restricted to moderate elevations in the Sierra Madre del Sur in central Guerrero. It inhabits cloud forest, mesic pine-oak woodland, tropical evergreen forest, and tropical semi-deciduous forest at elevations of 1600–2200 m.

== Taxonomy ==
Tropidodipsas papavericola was formally described in 2021 based on an adult male specimen collected from the municipality of Atoyac de Álvarez in Guerrero, Mexico. The specific epithet refers to the snake's habit of living among poppy plants, which are illegally planted throughout its range to produce opium. The species has the English common name poppyfield snailsucker and the Spanish common name Caracolera amapolera.

== Description ==
The species can be distinguished from other Tropidodipsas by a combination of the following characters: 15/15/15 rows of smooth dorsal scales with no enlarged vertebral row; a prefrontal scale that is broader than it is long, not entering the orbit; a loreal scale that is almost square and slightly longer than it is broad, not entering the orbit; 179–189 ventral scales in males; 69–76 divided subcaudals in males; 25–34 pale bands on the body and 10–16 pale bands on the tail; 26–36 dark bands on the body and 10–16 on the tail, irregular with faded pale centers in adults; and a dark chocolate-gray iris.

== Distribution and habitat ==
Tropidodipsas papavericola is restricted to moderate elevations in the Sierra Madre del Sur in central Guerrero. Its habitats include cloud forest, mesic pine-oak woodland, tropical evergreen forest, and tropical semi-deciduous forest. It is found at elevations of 1600–2200 m in the Sierra de Técpan de Galeana in the Sierra de Atoyac and above Acapulco, in foothills in the area between Acahuizotla and El Treinta. Specimens have been seen at night during the rainy season on low to medium vegetation up to 3 m tall or crossing the road.
