= Tropidodipsas tricolor =

Scientific classification
- Kingdom: Animalia
- Phylum: Chordata
- Class: Reptilia
- Order: Squamata
- Suborder: Serpentes
- Family: Colubridae
- Genus: Tropidodipsas
- Species: T. tricolor

Binomial name
- Tropidodipsas tricolor Grünwald, Toribio-Jiménez, Montaño-Ruvalcaba, Franz-Chávez, Peñaloza-Montaño, Barrera-Nava, J.M. Jones, C.M. Rodriguez, I.M. Hughes, Strickland & Reyes-Velasco, 2021

Species of snake

Tropidodipsas tricolor, the tricolor snailsucker, is a species of snake in the family, Colubridae. Formally described in 2021, it is named after the tricolor pattern of its dorsal color. It has a black body with 19–22 reddish orange, light-edged bands on the body, with 8 pale bands on the tail. Endemic to Mexico, it is restricted to moderate elevations in Sierra Madre del Sur from central Guerrero to western Oaxaca. It is mostly found at elevations of 1700–2200 m.

== Taxonomy ==
Tropidodipsas tricolor was formally described in 2021 based on an juvenile male specimen collected from near the Río Verde, in the municipality of Atoyac de Álvarez in Guerrero, Mexico. The specific epithet tricolor refers to the tricolor pattern of the black dorsal coloration interspersed by light dorsal bands of cream and reddish orange. The species has the English common name tricolor snailsucker and the Spanish common name Caracolera tricolor.

== Description ==
The ground color of the body is black. There are 19–22 reddish orange, light-edged bands on the body, most with dark brown or black medial stippling. There are 8 pale bands on the tail. The iris is chocolate brown. The species can be distinguished from other Tropidodipsas by a combination of its coloration and the following characters: 15/15/15 rows of smooth dorsal scales with no enlarged vertebral row; the prefrontal scale is broader than it is long, entering the orbit; the loreal scale is square, equally as long as it is high, and does not enter the orbit; both males and females have 183 ventral scales; and there are 78–79 divided subcaudals in males and 79 in females.

== Distribution and habitat ==
Tropidodipsas tricolor is restricted to moderate elevations in Sierra Madre del Sur from central Guerrero to western Oaxaca. Its habitats include cloud forest, mesic pine-oak woodland, tropical evergreen forest, and tropical semi-deciduous forest. The species is mostly found at elevations of 1700–2200 m, but occurs at 700–1000 m in mesic tropical evergreen forest in the Sierra de Atoyac. Specimens were found at night on low or medium vegetation up to 3 m tall, or as roadkill.
