= 4th federal electoral district of Guerrero =

Federal electoral district of Mexico

Guerrero's 4th
- Electoral district of the Chamber of Deputies of Mexico

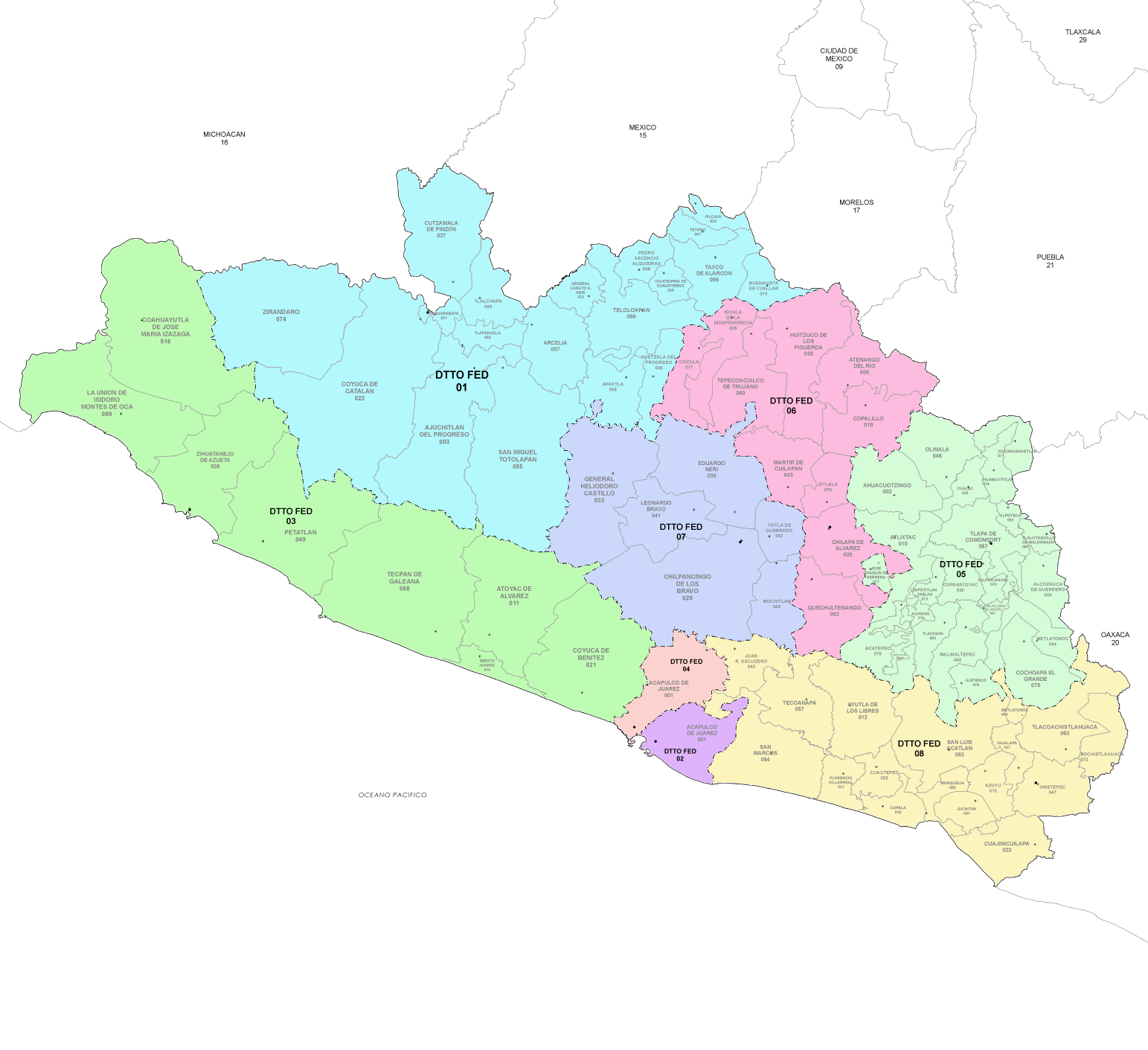
- 4th district since 2022

Incumbent
- Member: Javier Taja Ramírez
- Party: ▌Morena
- Congress: 66th (2024–2027)

District
- State: Guerrero
- Head town: Acapulco
- Coordinates: 16°53′N 99°54′W
- Covers: Municipality of Acapulco (part)
- PR region: Fourth
- Precincts: 237
- Population: 387,397 (2020 census)

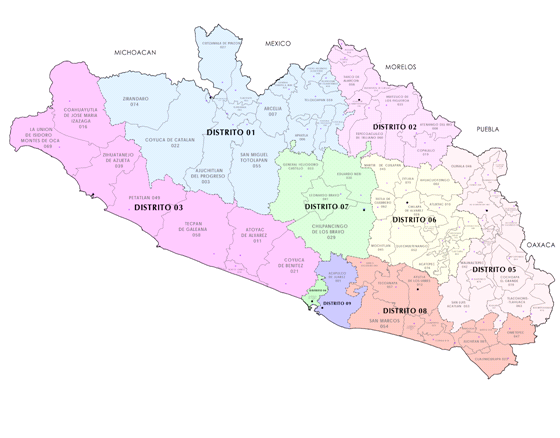
Guerrero under the 2017–2022 districting plan

The 4th federal electoral district of Guerrero (Spanish: Distrito electoral federal 04 de Guerrero) is one of the 300 electoral districts into which Mexico is divided for elections to the federal Chamber of Deputies and one of eight such districts in the state of Guerrero.

It elects one deputy to the lower house of Congress for each three-year legislative period by means of the first-past-the-post system. Votes cast in the district also count towards the calculation of proportional representation ("plurinominal") deputies elected from the fourth region.

The current member for the district, elected in the 2024 general election, is Javier Taja Ramírez of the National Regeneration Movement (Morena).

== District territory ==
Guerrero lost a congressional seat in the 2023 redistricting process carried out by the National Electoral Institute (INE). Under the new districting plan, which will be used for the 2024, 2027 and 2030 federal elections, the 4th district covers the north-western portion of the municipality of Acapulco, comprising 237 precincts (secciones electorales); the remainder of the municipality makes up the 2nd district.

The head town (cabecera distrital), where results from individual polling stations are gathered together and tallied, is the resort city of Acapulco. The district reported a population of 387,397 in the 2020 census.

== Previous districting schemes ==
Evolution of electoral district numbers
| | 1974 | 1978 | 1996 | 2005 | 2017 | 2023 |
|---|---|---|---|---|---|---|
| Guerrero | 6 | 10 | 10 | 9 | 9 | 8 |
| Chamber of Deputies | 196 | 300 | | | | |

Because of shifting population patterns, Guerrero currently has two fewer districts than the ten the state was assigned under the 1977 electoral reforms that set the national total at 300.

2017–2022

Between 2017 and 2022, Guerrero was allocated nine electoral districts. The 4th district was located in the western sector of the municipality of Acapulco but with a smaller surface area than under the 2023 plan, covering 223 precincts. The head town was Acapulco.

2005–2017

The 2005 districting plan assigned Guerrero nine districts. The 4th district covered 221 precincts in the north-west and south of the municipality of Acapulco. The city of Acapulco was its head town.

1996–2005

Under the 1996 districting plan, which allocated Guerrero ten districts, the 4th district was located in the northern and central part of the state. Its head town was at the city of Iguala and it comprised seven municipalities: Atenango del Río, Copalillo, Eduardo Neri, General Heliodoro Castillo, Huitzuco de los Figueroa, Iguala de la Independencia and Tepecoacuilco de Trujano.

1978–1996

The districting scheme in force from 1978 to 1996 was the result of the 1977 electoral reforms, which increased the number of single-member seats in the Chamber of Deputies from 196 to 300. Under that plan, Guerrero's district allocation rose from six to ten. The 4th district had its head town at Acapulco and it covered a part of that city.

== Deputies returned to Congress ==
(Mexico) National parties
- Current
- PAN
- PRI
- PT
- PVEM
- MC
- Morena
- PAZ
- Somos
- Defunct or local only
- PLM
- PNR
- PRM
- PNM
- PP
- PPS
- PARM
- PFCRN
- CON
- PANAL
- PSD
- PES
- PES
- PRD

Guerrero's 4th district
| Election | Deputy | Party | Term | Legislature |
|---|---|---|---|---|
| 1940 | Alfredo Córdova Lara | | 1940–1943 | 38th Congress |
| 1943 | Ramón Mata y Rodríguez | | 1943-1946 | 39th Congress |
| 1946 | Alejandro Gómez Maganda | Institutional Revolutionary Party | 1946-1949 | 40th Congress |
| 1949 | Mario Romero Lopetegui | Institutional Revolutionary Party | 1949–1952 | 41st Congress |
| 1952 | José Gómez Velasco | Institutional Revolutionary Party | 1952–1955 | 42nd Congress |
| 1955 | Gustavo Rueda Medina | Institutional Revolutionary Party | 1955–1958 | 43rd Congress |
| 1958 | Mario Castillo Carmona | Institutional Revolutionary Party | 1958–1961 | 44th Congress |
| 1961 | Gabriel Lagos Beltrán | Institutional Revolutionary Party | 1961–1964 | 45th Congress |
| 1964 | Rafael Camacho Salgado | Institutional Revolutionary Party | 1964–1967 | 46th Congress |
| 1967 | Israel Nogueda Otero | Institutional Revolutionary Party | 1967–1970 | 47th Congress |
| 1970 | Rogelio de la O Almazán | Institutional Revolutionary Party | 1970–1973 | 48th Congress |
| 1973 | Graciano Astudillo Alarcón | Institutional Revolutionary Party | 1973–1976 | 49th Congress |
| 1976 | Hortensia Santoyo de García | Institutional Revolutionary Party | 1976–1979 | 50th Congress |
| 1979 | Guadalupe Gómez Maganda | Institutional Revolutionary Party | 1979–1982 | 51st Congress |
| 1982 | Rosa Martha Muñuzuri | Institutional Revolutionary Party | 1982–1985 | 52nd Congress |
| 1985 | Amín Zarur Menes | Institutional Revolutionary Party | 1985–1988 | 53rd Congress |
| 1988 | Guadalupe Gómez Maganda | Institutional Revolutionary Party | 1988–1991 | 54th Congress |
| 1991 | Fernando Navarrete Magdaleno | Institutional Revolutionary Party | 1991–1994 | 55th Congress |
| 1994 | Antonio Piza Soberanis | Institutional Revolutionary Party | 1994–1997 | 56th Congress |
| 1997 | Héctor Vicario Castrejón | Institutional Revolutionary Party | 1997–2000 | 57th Congress |
| 2000 | Silvia Romero Suárez (Note: Romero Suárez resigned her seat on 26 November 2002 and was replaced by her substitute, Santamaría Ramírez.); Juan Manuel Santamaría Ramírez | Institutional Revolutionary Party | 2000–2002; 2002–2003 | 58th Congress |
| 2003 | Rubén Figueroa Smutny | Institutional Revolutionary Party | 2003–2006 | 59th Congress |
| 2006 | Ramón Almonte Borja | Party of the Democratic Revolution | 2006–2009 | 60th Congress |
| 2009 | Alejandro Carabias Icaza | Ecologist Green Party of Mexico | 2009–2012 | 61st Congress |
| 2012 | Víctor Manuel Jorrín Lozano | lk=Citizens' Movement (Mexico) | 2012–2015 | 62nd Congress |
| 2015 | Julieta Fernández Márquez | Institutional Revolutionary Party | 2015–2018 | 63rd Congress |
| 2018 | Abelina López Rodríguez (Note: López Rodríguez resigned her seat on 1 March 2021 to run (successfully) for the municipal presidency of Acapulco.); Leticia Lozano Zavala | National Regeneration Movement | 2018–2021; 2021 | 64th Congress |
| 2021 | Pablo Amílcar Sandoval | National Regeneration Movement | 2021–2024 | 65th Congress |
| 2024 | Javier Taja Ramírez | National Regeneration Movement | 2024–2027 | 66th Congress |

== Presidential elections ==
Guerrero's 4th district
| Election | District won by | Party or coalition | % |
|---|---|---|---|
| 2018 | Andrés Manuel López Obrador | Juntos Haremos Historia | 72.9393 |
| 2024 | Claudia Sheinbaum Pardo | Sigamos Haciendo Historia | 79.8329 |
