= Víctor Manuel Jorrín =

Mexican politician and psychiatrist

- Born: 13 January 1955 (age 71); Iguala, Guerrero, Mexico
- Occupation: Deputy
- Political party: MC
- Website: http://www.victorjorrin.org.mx/

Víctor Manuel Jorrín Lozano (born 13 January 1955) is a Mexican politician and psychiatrist affiliated with the Citizens' Movement (MC). In the 2012 general election he was elected to the Chamber of Deputies to represent the fourth district of Guerrero during the 62nd Congress.
