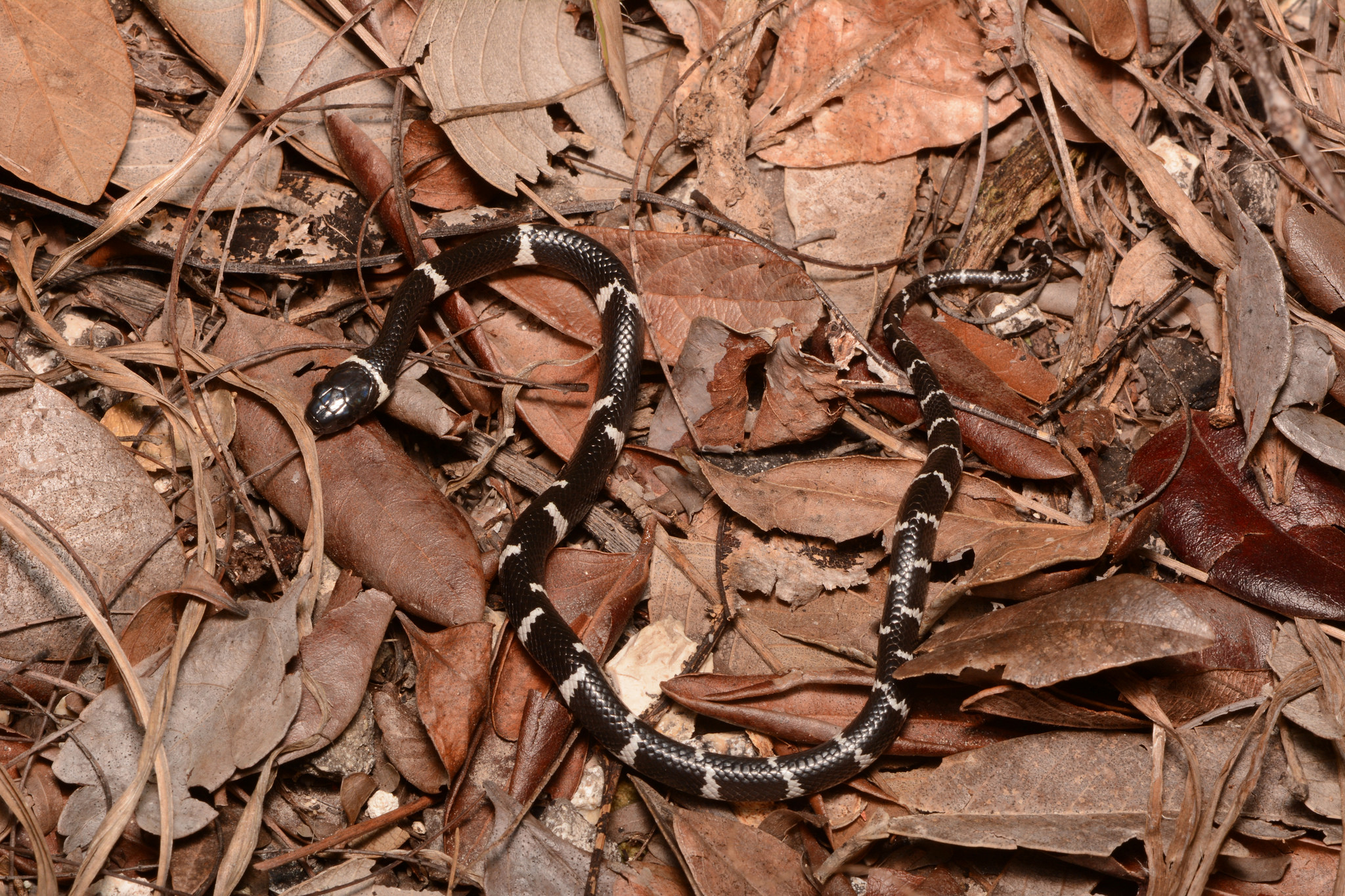

Conservation status
- Least Concern (IUCN 3.1)

Scientific classification
- Kingdom: Animalia
- Phylum: Chordata
- Class: Reptilia
- Order: Squamata
- Suborder: Serpentes
- Family: Colubridae
- Genus: Tropidodipsas
- Species: T. fasciata

Binomial name
- Tropidodipsas fasciata Günther, 1858

Synonyms
- Leptognathus subannulatus Müller, 1887; Cochliophagus tornieri Müller, 1924; Tropidodipsas guerreroensis Taylor, 1939

= Tropidodipsas fasciata =

Species of snake

The banded snail sucker (Tropidodipsas fasciata) is a species of snake of the family Colubridae.

== Geographic range ==
The snake is found in Mexico, in the states of Guerrero, Tamaulipas, Veracruz and Oaxaca, and possibly in Guatemala.
