= Tropidodipsas fischeri =

Conservation status
- Least Concern (IUCN 3.1)

Scientific classification
- Kingdom: Animalia
- Phylum: Chordata
- Class: Reptilia
- Order: Squamata
- Suborder: Serpentes
- Family: Colubridae
- Genus: Tropidodipsas
- Species: T. fischeri

Binomial name
- Tropidodipsas fischeri (Boulenger, 1894)

Species of snake

Tropidodipsas fischeri, a Fischer's snail-eating snake, is a species of snake in the family, Colubridae. It is found in Mexico, Guatemala, El Salvador, and Honduras.
