= Tropidodipsas guerreroensis =

Scientific classification
- Kingdom: Animalia
- Phylum: Chordata
- Class: Reptilia
- Order: Squamata
- Suborder: Serpentes
- Family: Colubridae
- Genus: Tropidodipsas
- Species: T. guerreroensis

Binomial name
- Tropidodipsas guerreroensis Taylor, 1939

Species of snake

Tropidodipsas guerreroensis, the Guerrero snail sucker, is a species of snake in the family, Colubridae. It is found in Mexico.
