= List of storms named Lester =

The name Lester has been used for seven tropical cyclones in the East Pacific Ocean:

- Tropical Storm Lester (1980) – weak storm that did not affect land
- Tropical Storm Lester (1986) – weak storm that did not affect land
- Hurricane Lester (1992) – Category 1 hurricane that made landfall in Baja California and Sonora
- Hurricane Lester (1998) – Category 3 hurricane that moved close to Mexico
- Tropical Storm Lester (2004) – weak storm that stayed just offshore Mexico
- Hurricane Lester (2016) – Category 4 hurricane that passed north of Hawaii
- Tropical Storm Lester (2022) – weak storm that made landfall in Guerrero

== See also ==
- Cyclone Les (1998) – an Australian region tropical cyclone with a similar name
