= Hurricane Lester (1992) =

Category 1 Pacific hurricane in 1992

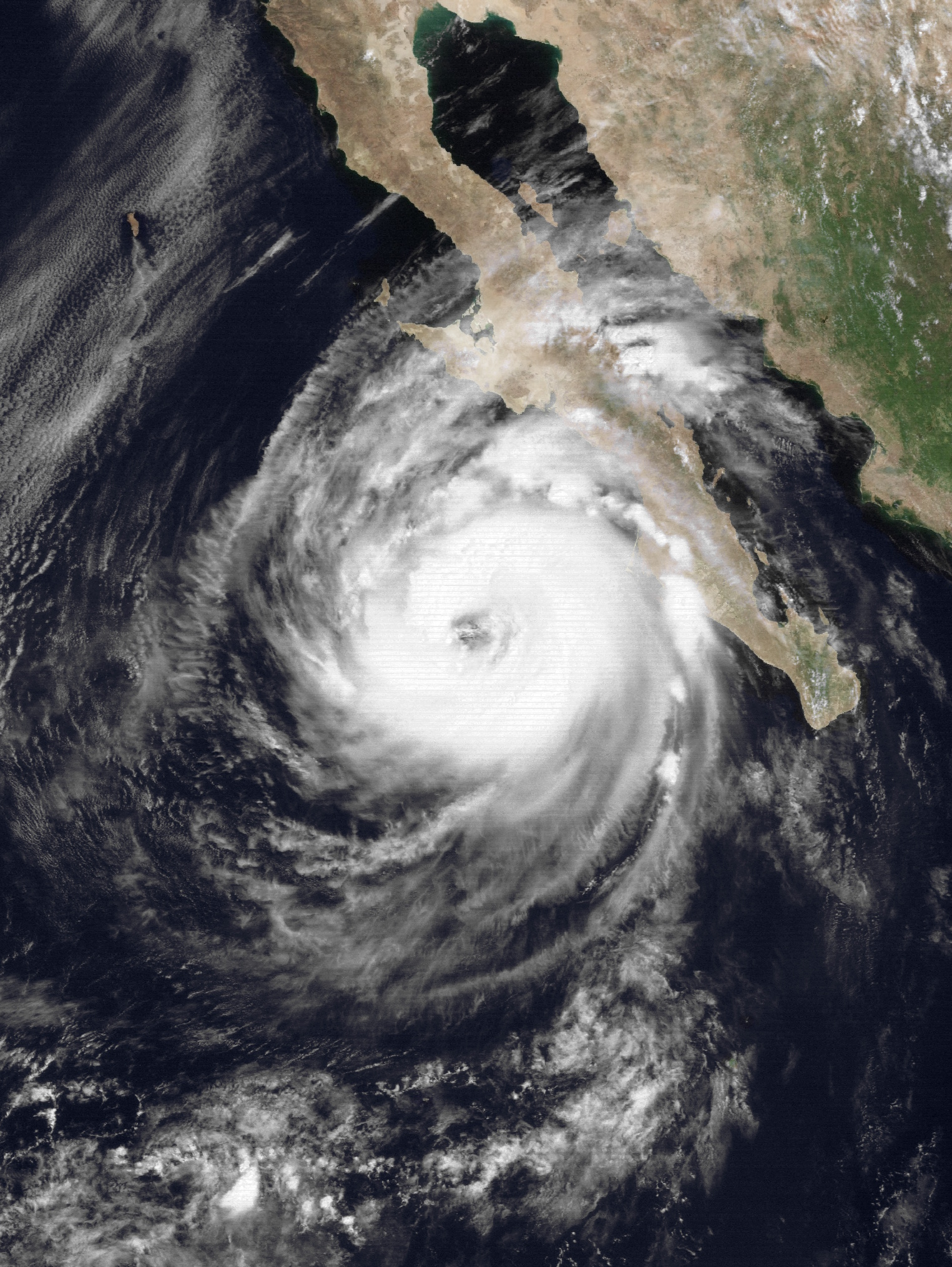
- Hurricane Lester nearing landfall on the Baja California peninsula at peak intensity on August 22

Meteorological history
- Formed: August 20, 1992
- Extratropical: August 24, 1992
- Dissipated: August 29, 1992

Category 1 hurricane
- 1-minute sustained (SSHWS/NWS)
- Highest winds: 80 mph (130 km/h)
- Lowest pressure: 985 mbar (hPa); 29.09 inHg

Overall effects
- Fatalities: 3 direct
- Damage: $3 million (1992 USD)
- Areas affected: Baja California peninsula (Baja California, Baja California Sur), northwestern Mexico, Southwestern United States, Central United States, Midwestern United States, Mid-Atlantic states
- IBTrACS
- Part of the 1992 Pacific hurricane season

Hurricane Lester was the first Pacific tropical cyclone to enter the United States as a tropical storm since 1967. The fourteenth named storm and eighth hurricane of the 1992 Pacific hurricane season, Lester formed on August 20 from a tropical wave southwest of Mexico. The tropical storm moved generally northwestward while steadily intensifying. After turning to the north, approaching the Mexican coast, Lester attained hurricane status. The hurricane reached peak winds of 85 mph (137 km/h) before making landfall on west-central Baja California. The system weakened while moving across the peninsula and then over northwestern Mexico. Not long after entering Arizona, Lester weakened to a tropical depression, and degenerated into an extratropical low on August 24, 1992, over New Mexico. The storm's remnants later merged with the remnants of Hurricane Andrew and another frontal system on August 29.

In Mexico, the hurricane resulted in $3 million in damage (1992 USD, $4.7 million 2011 USD). It also left 5,000 people homeless, and was responsible for three fatalities. The remnants of Lester also produced moderate rainfall and minor flooding across southern California, Colorado, Arizona, and New Mexico, as well as rare August snow in the Rocky Mountains.

== Meteorological history ==
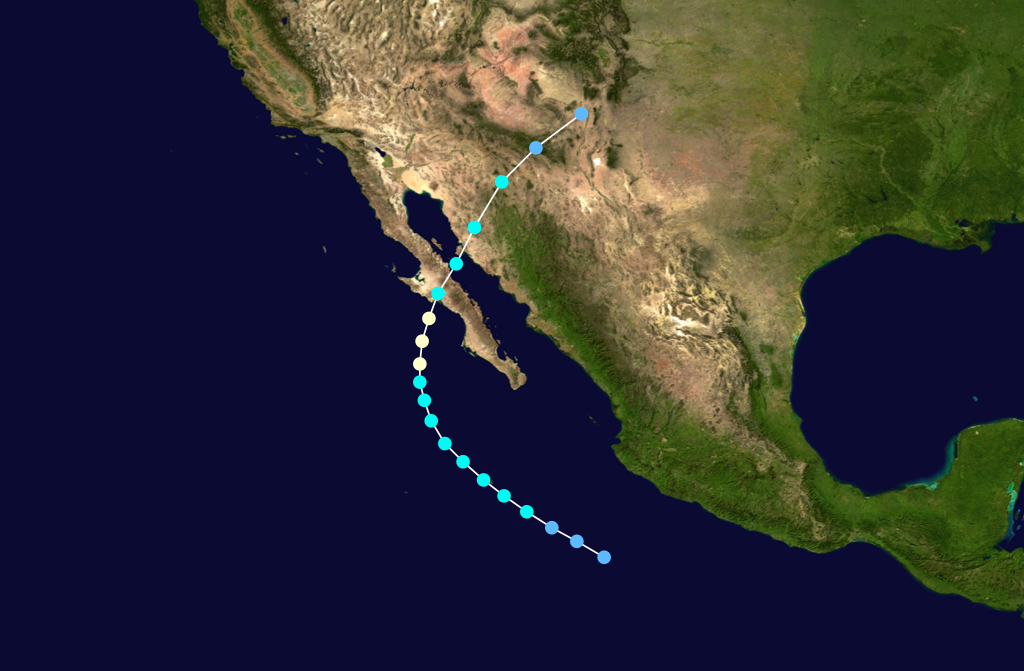
Map plotting the storm's track and intensity, according to the Saffir–Simpson scale Map key Saffir–Simpson scale Tropical depression (≤38 mph, ≤62 km/h) Tropical storm (39–73 mph, 63–118 km/h) Category 1 (74–95 mph, 119–153 km/h) Category 2 (96–110 mph, 154–177 km/h) Category 3 (111–129 mph, 178–208 km/h) Category 4 (130–156 mph, 209–251 km/h) Category 5 (≥157 mph, ≥252 km/h) Unknown Storm type Tropical cyclone Subtropical cyclone Extratropical cyclone, remnant low, tropical disturbance, or monsoon depression

The origins of Hurricane Lester can be traced back to a tropical wave that moved off the coast of western Africa on August 7. Over the next week, the wave remained rather obscure as it moved across the Atlantic Ocean and the Caribbean before it appeared to split into two as it approached Cuba during August 16. The northern half of the wave dissipated over Cuba, while the southern half passed over Central America and moved into the Pacific Ocean on August 16. After the wave had moved into the Pacific, atmospheric convection increased over the system and it became better organized over the next few days. On August 20, the United States National Hurricane Center (NHC) stated that the system had probably developed into a depression, initiated advisories and designated the system as Tropical Depression Fourteen-E.

The depression gradually tracked northwestward at 15 mph (24 km/h). Although the center of the depression was initially uncertain, it slowly strengthened and steadily organized. The depression attained tropical storm status late on August 20, upon which the storm was named Lester. The cyclone continued to the northwest, and passed directly over Socorro Island on August 21. By early the next day, an eastward moving trough weakened the ridge to its north, resulting in a to turn to the north. Around this time, forecasters at the National Hurricane Center predicted the storm would not strengthen to hurricane intensity before making landfall. Despite this, Lester intensified into a hurricane late on August 22 while located about 240 miles (390 km) west of La Paz in Baja California Sur.

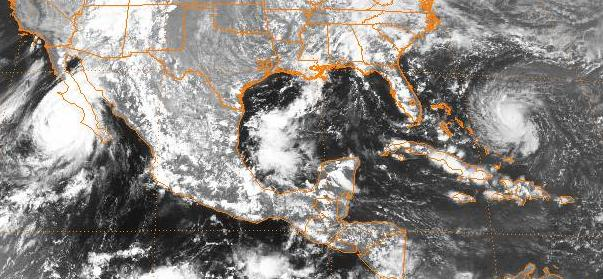
Hurricane Lester and Hurricane Andrew (right) on August 22

The hurricane continued to organize and banding-type eye soon formed. Early on August 23 it attained peak winds of 85 mph (137 km/h) with a minimum central pressure of 985 hPa (29.09 inHg). Lester weakened steadily as the storm turned to the northeast, and made landfall as a minimal hurricane near Punta Abreojos, Baja California Sur about ten hours after reaching peak intensity. It degenerated into a tropical storm while crossing the Baja California peninsula. After passing through the northern Gulf of California, it made a second landfall near Isla Tiburon in the state of Sonora. Lester entered Arizona as a tropical storm on August 24, the first time since Hurricane Katrina in 1967 that an Eastern Pacific tropical cyclone entered the United States with winds of at least tropical storm intensity. Lester maintained tropical storm status until it weakened into a tropical depression near Tucson, Arizona. Later that day, the low-level circulation dissipated over New Mexico, and Lester ceased to exist as a tropical cyclone. The storm's remnants transitioned into an extratropical cyclone, as it continued to the north-northeast, ahead of an approaching trough, and later merged with the remnants of Hurricane Andrew and another frontal system on August 29, over Pennsylvania.

== Preparations and impact ==
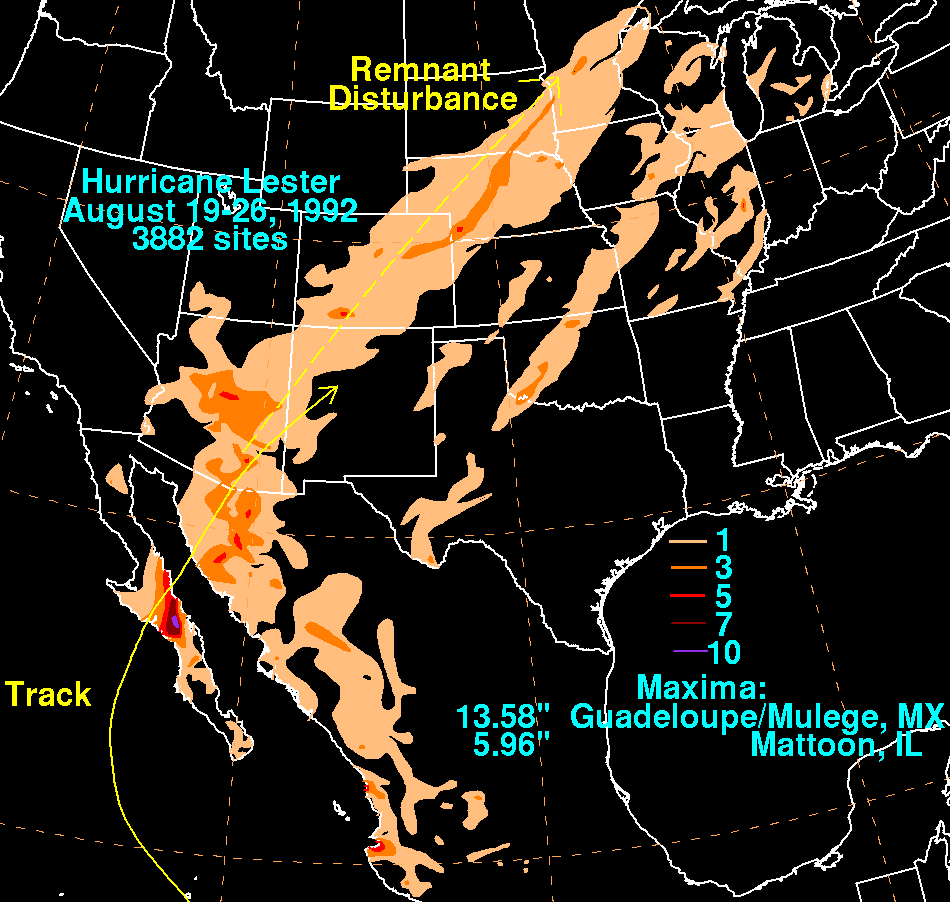
Rainfall from Hurricane Lester

Hurricane Lester impacted Mexicos's Revillagigedo Islands, Baja California peninsula and the states of Sinaloa and Sonora on the mainland, as well as parts of the Southwestern United States, including California, Arizona, Utah and New Mexico. No deaths were blamed on the system while at least in damages were attributed to the system. Hurricane Andrew's landfall in Florida overshadowed Lester's impacts to the United States.

=== Mexico ===
The threat of the hurricane prompted the evacuation of about 10,000 residents.

No observations exist for the duration when Lester, as a tropical depression, moved over Socorro Island, while winds were estimated to have reached 37 mph (60 km/h). However, a station reported winds of 23 mph (37 km/h) six hours after Lester passed over Socorro Island. Several ships came in contact with Lester, with one in the eye reporting hurricane-force winds for 11 hours on August 22. The ship in the eye reported rough seas, causing it to roll 33° to each side and thus was responsible for a large amount of cargo to go overboard.

Hurricane Lester produced heavy rainfall across its path through the Baja California peninsula and Sonora. Peak rainfall occurred in Mulegé with 13.58 in (345 mm). A weather station in Presa Rodriguez reported 8.66 inches (220 mm) of precipitation, with several other locations reporting over 2 inches (51 mm). The heavy rainfall caused extensive flood damage to the west of Hermosillo, destroying some entire communities and flooding a large highway. Roads were washed out, and power lines were knocked out. Waves up to 20 feet (6.1 m) were recorded. Flash flooding from Lester caused 10,000 people to be evacuated from their homes. In addition, mudslides killed three people, and left 5,000 homeless. The storm resulted in $3 million (1992 US$), equivalent to $4.7 million (2011 US$). The Mexican Army provided relief efforts to residents after the storm.

==== Baja California ====
On August 21, the Mexican Government issued a tropical storm warning for the west coast of Baja California Del Sur from Cabo San Lucas to Cabo San Lázaro and a tropical storm watch for both coasts from the border with Baja California Del Norte, Cabo San Lazaro on the west coast and Los Burros on the east coast. During the following day, after Lester had started to move northwards a tropical storm warning was issued for the whole of Baja California Del Sur, before a hurricane warning was issued between Punta Eugenia and Cabo San Lazaro.

==== Mainland ====
On August 22, the Mexican government issued a tropical storm warning for the Mexican mainland between Cabo Tepopa and Los Mochis.

=== United States ===
The remnants of Lester produced heavy rainfall across the Southwestern United States. In Arizona, rainfall amounted to over 5 inches (130 mm) near Phoenix and Tucson, with much of the rest of the state reporting over 1 inch (25 mm). Moderate rainfall was also reported in western New Mexico and southern Utah, while one location in southwestern Colorado reported over 5 inches (130 mm) of precipitation. In the later location, rains caused flash flooding of arroyos and a mudslide along U.S. Route 180. Additional rainfall caused moderate flooding in Denver. In addition to the rainfall, moisture from the remnants of Lester dropped 2 to 4 inches (5 to 10 centimetres) of snow across portions of Colorado, causing traffic problems in mountainous areas. A weather station on Mt. Harvard recorded about 4 inches (10 cm) of snow during Lester's passage through Colorado. Moisture enhanced from a cold front, the remnants Lester extended through the eastern United States, with Mattoon, Illinois reporting a peak of 5.96 inches (151 mm). In all, rain from Lester caused rainfall records in Minnesota, Colorado, and North Dakota, though some were later broken.

==== Arizona ====
Hurricane Lester was the seventh tropical cyclone and the fourth tropical storm on record to move into Arizona, since the start of the satellite era in 1965.

== See also ==
- List of storms named Lester
- List of Baja California Peninsula hurricanes
- List of Category 1 Pacific hurricanes
