= List of storms named Hernan =

The name Hernan has been used for eight tropical cyclones in the Eastern Pacific Ocean.

- Tropical Storm Hernan (1984) – minimal tropical storm with no effect on land
- Hurricane Hernan (1990) – high-end Category 4 hurricane, did not affect land
- Hurricane Hernan (1996) – struck Mexico as a Category 1 hurricane, caused unknown amount of damage
- Hurricane Hernan (2002) – Category 5 hurricane that caused minor effects in Mexico and California
- Hurricane Hernan (2008) – Category 3 hurricane, no land impact
- Hurricane Hernan (2014) – Category 1 hurricane with no effect on land
- Tropical Storm Hernan (2020) – minimal tropical storm that brushed western Mexico, causing flooding and mudslides
- Tropical Storm Hernan (2026) – weak tropical storm that remained at sea
