= Smutný =

Smutný (feminine: Smutná) is a Czech and Slovak surname, meaning 'sad'. Notable people with the surname include:

- Engelbert Smutny (1917–1972), Austrian footballer and manager
- Kateřina Smutná (born 1983), Czech-Austrian cross-country skier
- Lucie Smutná (born 1991), Czech volleyball player
- Roman Smutný (born 1985), Czech footballer
- Rubén Figueroa Smutny (born 1967), Mexican politician
- Vladimír Smutný (1942–2025), Czech cinematographer
