= Silvano Blanco Deaquino =

Mexican politician

- Born: 10 February 1962 (age 64); Guerrero, Mexico
- Occupation: Deputy
- Political party: PRD

Silvano Blanco Deaquino (born 10 February 1962) is a Mexican politician affiliated with the Party of the Democratic Revolution (PRD). In the 2012 general election he was elected to the Chamber of Deputies to represent the third district of Guerrero during the 62nd Congress.
