= Rubén Figueroa Smutny =

Mexican politician (born 1967)

- Born: 13 April 1967 (age 59); Huitzuco de los Figueroa, Guerrero, Mexico
- Education: Universidad Panamericana
- Occupation: Politician
- Political party: PRI

José Rubén Figueroa Smutny (Note: In this Mexican name, the surname is Figueroa and the second or maternal family name is Smutny.) (born 13 April 1967) is a Mexican politician affiliated with the Institutional Revolutionary Party (PRI).

He served in the Congress of Guerrero from 1999 to 2002 and, in the 2003 mid-terms, he was elected to the Chamber of Deputies to represent the 4th district of Guerrero during the 59th session of Congress. From 2006 to 2018, he was the alternate of Senator Jorge Mendoza Garza.

He is the son of Rubén Figueroa Alcocer, who served as governor of Guerrero from 1993 to 1996.
