= Secundino Catarino Crispín =

Mexican politician

- Born: 2 July 1959 (age 66); Guerrero, Mexico
- Occupation: Politician
- Political party: PRD

Secundino Catarino Crispín (born 2 July 1959) is a Mexican politician from the Party of the Democratic Revolution (PRD). From 2008 to 2009 he served in the federal Chamber of Deputies, representing Guerrero's third district during the 60th Congress.
