= Tropidodipsas philippii =

Conservation status
- Least Concern (IUCN 3.1)

Scientific classification
- Kingdom: Animalia
- Phylum: Chordata
- Class: Reptilia
- Order: Squamata
- Suborder: Serpentes
- Family: Colubridae
- Genus: Tropidodipsas
- Species: T. philippii

Binomial name
- Tropidodipsas philippii (Jan, 1863)

Species of snake

Tropidodipsas philippii, Philippi's snail-eating snake, is a species of snake in the family, Colubridae. It is found in Mexico.
