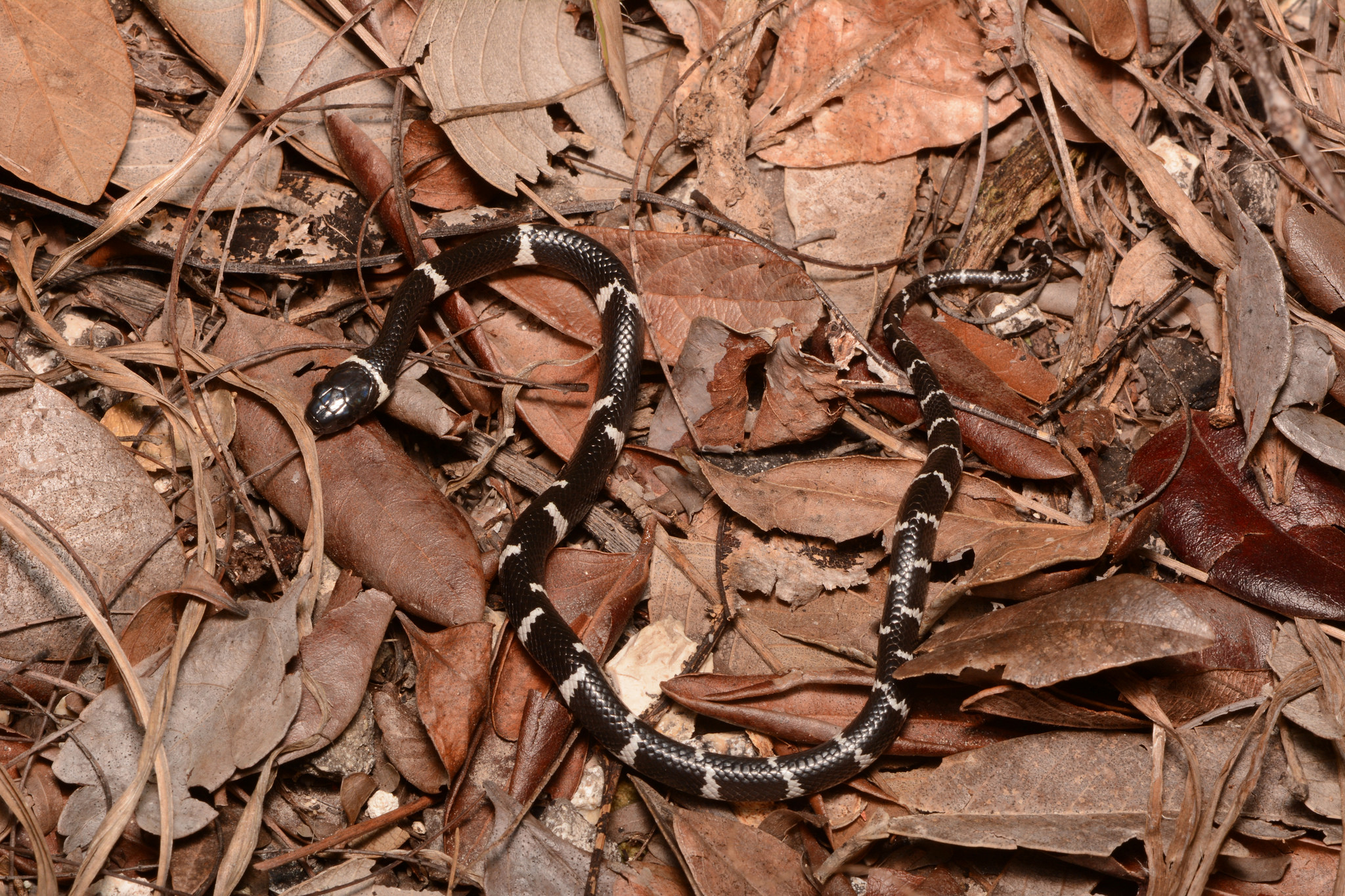
- Tropidodipsas fasciata

Scientific classification
- Kingdom: Animalia
- Phylum: Chordata
- Class: Reptilia
- Order: Squamata
- Suborder: Serpentes
- Family: Colubridae
- Subfamily: Dipsadinae
- Genus: Tropidodipsas; Günther, 1858

= Tropidodipsas =

Genus of snakes

Tropidodipsas is a genus of New World snakes in the subfamily Dipsadinae of the family Colubridae.

== Geographic range ==
Species of the genus Tropidodipsas are found in Mexico and Central America.

== Species ==
Eight species are recognized as being valid.

- Tropidodipsas fasciata Günther, 1858 – banded snail sucker
- Tropidodipsas fischeri Boulenger, 1894 – Fischer’s snail-eating snake
- Tropidodipsas guerreroensis Taylor, 1939 – Guerrero snail sucker
- Tropidodipsas papavericola Grünwald, Toribio-Jiménez, Montaño-Ruvalcaba, Franz-Chávez, Peñaloza-Montaño, Barrera-Nava, J.M. Jones, C.M. Rodriguez, I. Hughes, Strickland & Reyes-Velasco, 2021
- Tropidodipsas philippii (Jan, 1863) – Philippi’s snail-eating snake
- Tropidodipsas repleta H.M. Smith, Lemos-Espinal, Hartman & Chiszar, 2005
- Tropidodipsas tricolor Grünwald, Toribio-Jiménez, Montaño-Ruvalcaba, Franz-Chávez, Peñaloza-Montaño, Barrera-Nava, J.M. Jones, C.M. Rodriguez, I.M. Hughes, Strickland & Reyes-Velasco, 2021 – tricolor snail sucker
- Tropidodipsas zweifeli Liner & Wilson, 1970 – Zweifel’s snail-eating snake

== Etymology ==
The specific name, fischeri, is in honor of German herpetologist Johann Gustav Fischer.

The specific name, philippii, is in honor of German-Chilean zoologist Rodolfo Amando Philippi.

The specific name, zweifeli, is in honor of American herpetologist Richard G. Zweifel.
