= Ramón Almonte Borja =

Mexican politician

- Born: 15 April 1963 (age 63); Guerrero, Mexico
- Occupation: Politician
- Political party: PRD

Ramón Almonte Borja (born 15 April 1963) is a Mexican politician affiliated with the Party of the Democratic Revolution (PRD). In the 2006 general election he was elected to the Chamber of Deputies to represent the fourth district of Guerrero during the 60th Congress.
