= Alejandro Carabias Icaza =

Mexican politician

- Born: 9 January 1973 (age 53); Acapulco, Guerrero, Mexico
- Occupation: Politician
- Political party: PVEM

Alejandro Carabias Icaza (born 9 January 1973) is a Mexican politician from the Ecologist Green Party of Mexico (PVEM). In the 2009 mid-terms he was elected to the Chamber of Deputies to represent the fourth district of Guerrero during the 61st Congress (2009–2012).
