= Celestino Bailón Guerrero =

Mexican politician

- Born: 26 July 1954 (age 71); Tecpan de Galeana, Guerrero, Mexico
- Occupation: Politician
- Political party: PRI

Celestino Bailón Guerrero (born 26 July 1954) is a Mexican politician from the Institutional Revolutionary Party (PRI). In the 2000 general election he was elected to the Chamber of Deputies to represent the third district of Guerrero during the 58th Congress.
