= Francisco Chavarría Valdeolívar =

Mexican politician

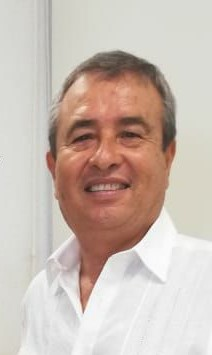
- Born: 2 April 1954 (age 72); Petatlán, Guerrero, Mexico
- Occupation: Politician
- Political party: PRD

Francisco Chavarría Valdeolívar (born 2 April 1954) is a Mexican politician affiliated with the Party of the Democratic Revolution (PRD). In the 2003 mid-terms he was elected to the Chamber of Deputies to represent the third district of Guerrero during the 59th Congress, and he had previously served as municipal president of Petatlán from 1990 to 1993.
