= Amador Campos Aburto =

Mexican politician

- Born: 25 May 1951 (age 74); Guerrero, Mexico
- Occupation: Politician
- Political party: PRD

Amador Campos Aburto (born 25 May 1951) is a Mexican politician affiliated with the Party of the Democratic Revolution (PRD). In the 2006 general election he was elected to the Chamber of Deputies to represent the third district of Guerrero during the 60th Congress, and he had previously served as municipal president of Zihuatanejo de Azueta from 2002 to 2005. After his term in Congress, he served as a local deputy in the 60th session of the Congress of Guerrero.
