= San Jerónimo de Juárez =

City in the Mexican state of Guerrero

- Municipal seat and city
- Location within Guerrero Location within Mexico
- Coordinates: 16°43′N 98°44′W
- Country: Mexico
- State: Guerrero
- Municipality: Benito Juárez
- Time zone: UTC-6 (Zona Centro)

San Jerónimo de Juárez is a city and seat of the municipality of Benito Juárez, in the state of Guerrero, southern Mexico.
