= Huitzuco =

City in the Mexican state of Guerrero

- Municipal seat and city
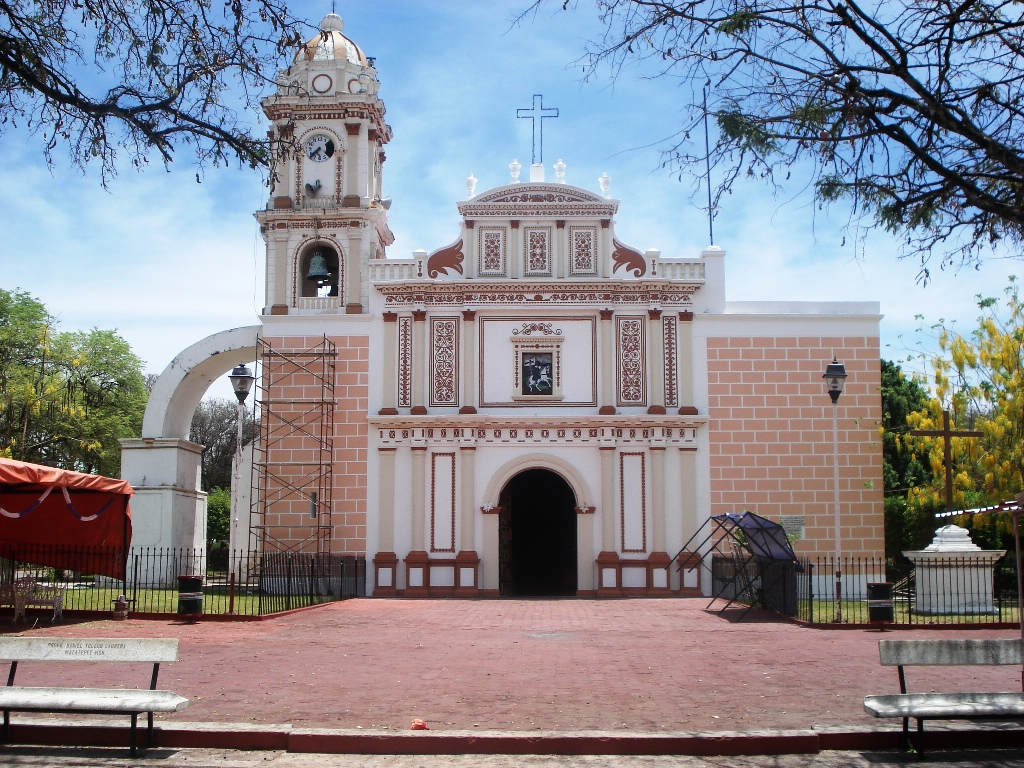

- Location in Mexico Huitzuco (Mexico)
- Coordinates: 18°18′N 99°21′W
- Country: Mexico
- State: Guerrero
- Municipality: Huitzuco de los Figueroa

Population (2005)
  - Total: 16,025
- Time zone: UTC-6 (Zona Centro)

Huitzuco (the municipal seat of Huitzuco de los Figueroa) is located in the Mexican state of Guerrero. It was founded in the early 19th century. Different versions exist on the meaning of the word Huitzuco: Dr. Gutierre Tibón affirms that it comes from the Nahuatl huitzilizo (thorns), and the locative co, and so means as “Place of Thorns”, because their lands were covered with huisache.
