= Coahuayutla de José María Izazaga =

Municipality in the Mexican state of Guerrero

- Municipality
- Location in Mexico
- Coordinates: 18°43′N 101°22′W
- Country: Mexico
- State: Guerrero
- Municipal seat: Coahuayutla de Guerrero

Area
  - Total: 3,511.5 km^{2} (1,355.8 sq mi)

Population (2005)
  - Total: 13,291

Coahuayutla de José María Izazaga is a municipality in the Mexican state of Guerrero, being the least densely populated municipality in Guerrero. The municipality covers an area of 3,511.5 km^{2}. The most populated towns are Coahuayutla de Guerrero (1373 inhabitants), Nueva Cuadrilla (574), El Platanillo (458), Barrio de Lozano (El Rosario) (408), Barrio de Guzmán (El Limón) (240), Colmeneros (243) and El Naranjo (220).

As of 2005, the municipality had a total population of 13,291.
