= Coahuayutla de Guerrero =

City in the Mexican state of Guerrero

- Municipal seat and city
- Location in Mexico Coahuayutla de Guerrero (Mexico)
- Coordinates: 18°19′N 101°49′W
- Country: Mexico
- State: Guerrero
- Municipality: Coahuayutla de José María Izazaga

Population (2005)
  - Total: 1,373
- Time zone: UTC-6 (Zona Centro)

Coahuayutla de Guerrero is a city and seat of the municipality of Coahuayutla de José María Izazaga, in the southern Mexican state of Guerrero. In 2005, the population of Coahuayutla de Guerrero was 1,373.
