= Fátima Aburto Baselga =

Spanish physician

Fátima Aburto Baselga (born 11 February 1949, Madrid) is a Spanish physician and politician who belongs to the Spanish Socialist Workers' Party. She has a degree in Medicine and Surgery and specialises in Paediatrics.

Married, with two daughters, she served in the Spanish Senate from 2000 to 2004 before being elected for the lower chamber in 2004, being re-elected in 2008, representing Huelva on both occasions. She also was a member of the Committee on Foreign Affairs from 2008 to 2011, the First Vice-President of the Health and Consumption Commission from 2008 to 2011, and was an alternate member of the Spanish Delegation to the Assembly of the Western European Union during 2008.

She is currently working as a pediatrician at the JRJ Hospital of Huelva, and was the director of the pediatrician management unit during 2013.
