= Atoyac de Álvarez (municipality) =

Municipality in the Mexican state of Guerrero

- Municipality
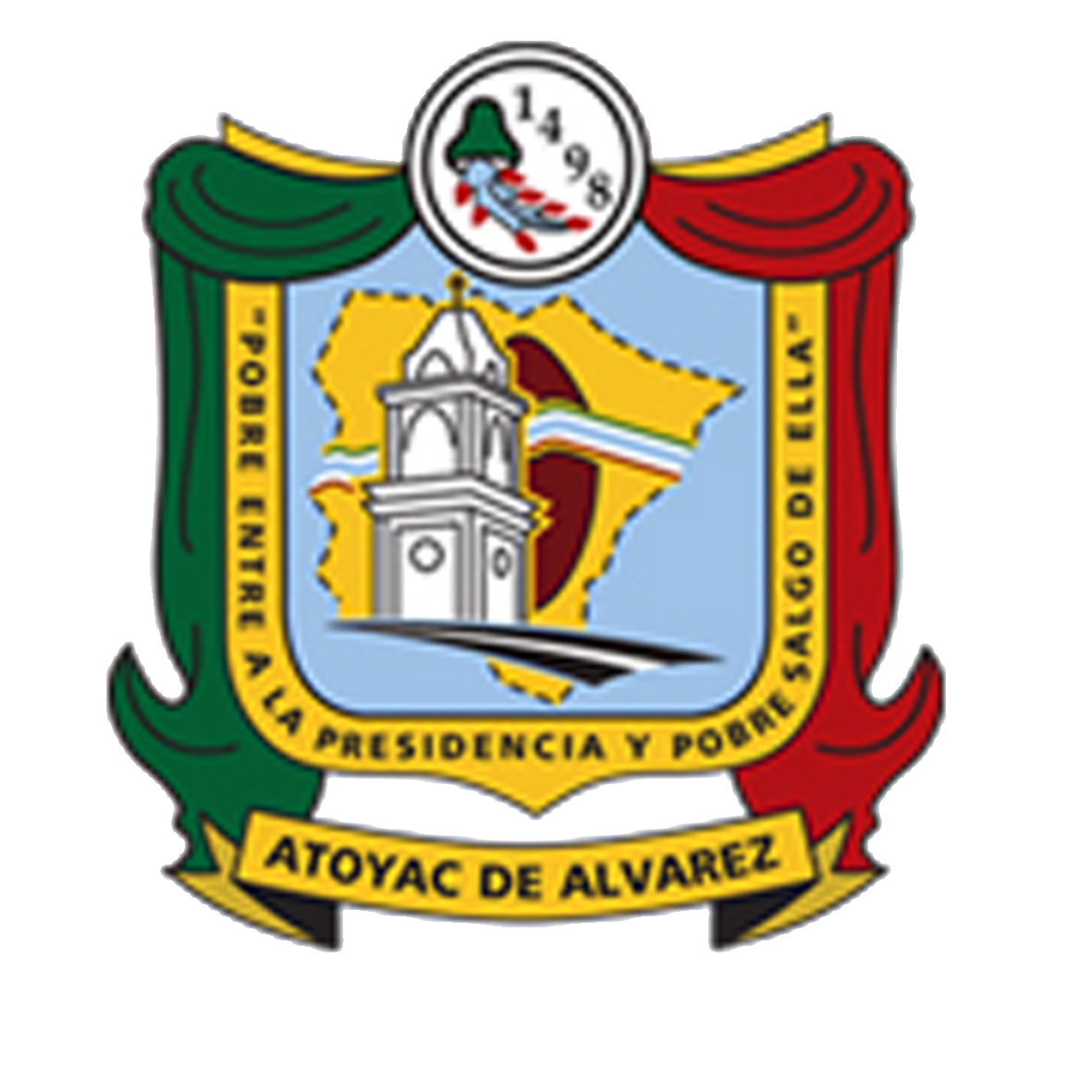
- Coat of arms

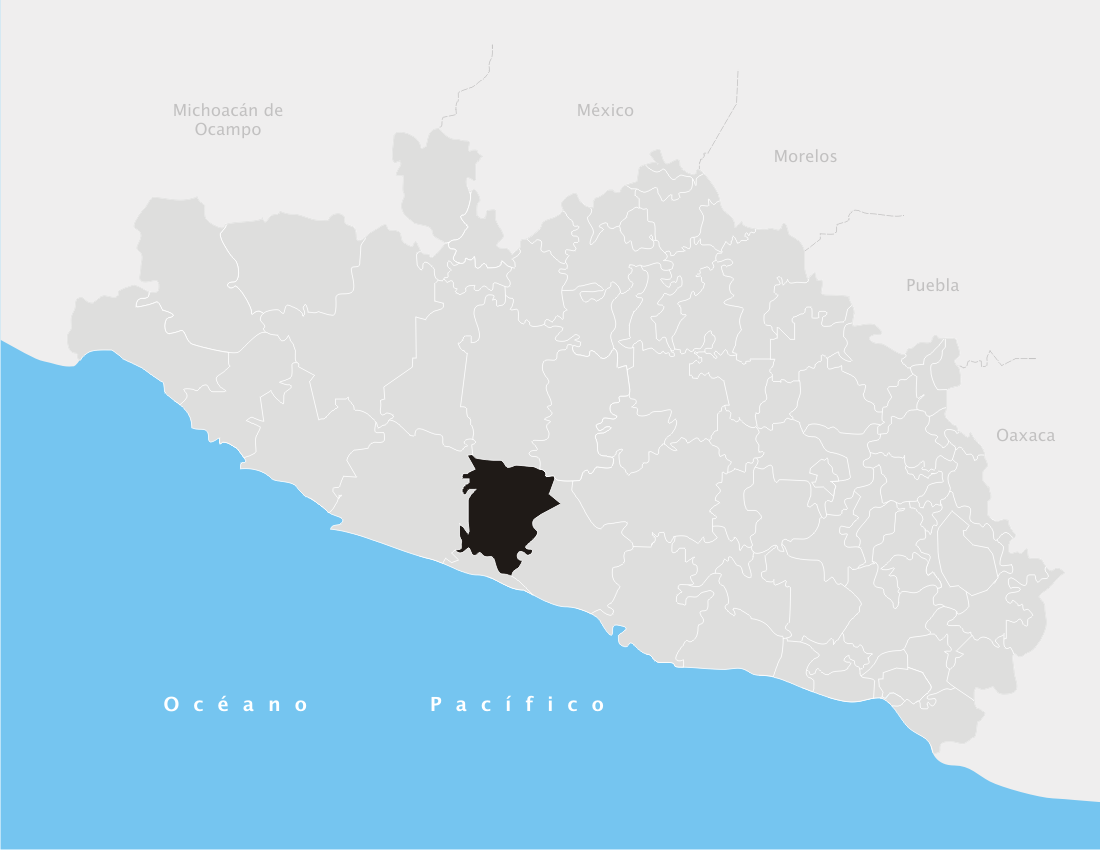
- Municipality of Atoyac de Álvarez in Guerrero

- Location in Mexico
- Coordinates: 17°03′N 100°05′W
- Country: Mexico
- State: Guerrero
- Municipal seat: Atoyac de Álvarez

Area
  - Total: 1,638.4 km^{2} (632.6 sq mi)

Population (2020)
  - Total: 60,680
- Website: https://ayuntamientodeatoyac.gob.mx/

Atoyac de Álvarez is a municipality in the Mexican state of Guerrero. The municipal seat lies at Atoyac de Álvarez. The municipality covers an area of 1,638.4 km^{2} (632.6 sq mi).

== Geography ==
Atoyac is located on the Costa Grande of the state of Guerrero, about 84 kilometers (52 mi) west of the port of Acapulco, which is the main city of the state. It has an area of 1,638.4 km^{2} (632.6 sq mi). It limits to the north with San Miguel Totolapan, Ajuchitlán del Progreso and General Heliodoro Castillo; to the east with Coyuca de Benítez; to the west with Tecpan de Galeana and to the south with Benito Juárez. The extreme coordinates of the municipality are 17° 03' - 18° 32' north latitude, and 100° 05' - 100 ° 34' west longitude.

In 2020, the municipality had a total population of 60,680, up from 58,452 in 2005.
