= Coyuca de Benítez =

City in the Mexican state of Guerrero

- Municipal seat and city

- Location within Guerrero Location within Mexico
- Coordinates: 17°2′N 100°4′W
- Country: Mexico
- State: Guerrero
- Municipality: Coyuca de Benítez

Population (2020)
  - Total: 13,866
- Time zone: UTC-6 (Central)
- Website: https://coyucadebenitez.gob.mx/

Coyuca de Benítez is a city and seat of the municipality of Coyuca de Benítez, in the state of Guerrero, southern Mexico.

== History ==
=== 2023 shooting ===
A shooting occurred in the town on October 23, 2023, leaving 13 persons dead and 2 injured in the city. 10 other persons died in other areas as a result of related attacks the same day.

== See also ==
- Luces en el Mar
