= Benito Juárez, Guerrero =

Municipality in the Mexican state of Guerrero

Benito Juárez
- Municipality
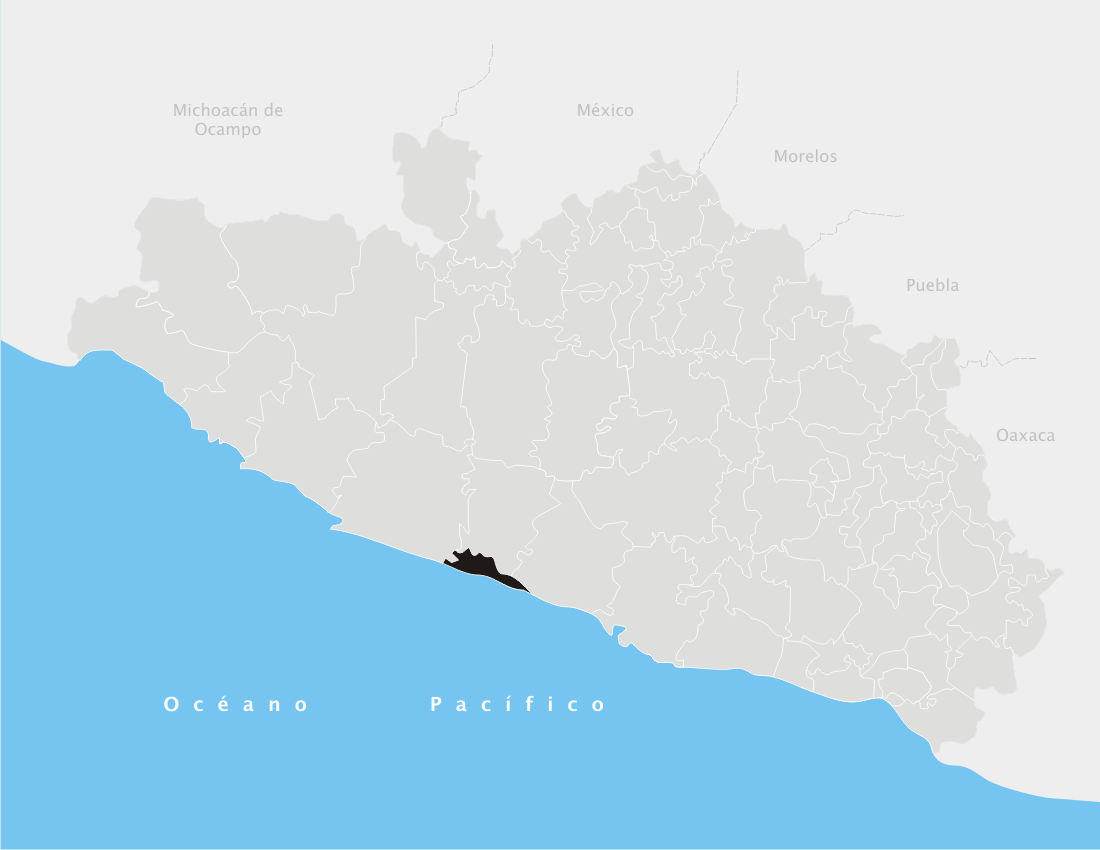
- Municipality of Benito Juárez in Guerrero

- Location in Mexico
- Coordinates: 17°11′N 100°30′W
- Country: Mexico
- State: Guerrero
- Municipal seat: San Jerónimo de Juárez

Area
  - Total: 284.9 km^{2} (110.0 sq mi)

Population (2005)
  - Total: 14,444

Benito Juárez is a municipality in the Mexican state of Guerrero. The municipal seat lies at San Jerónimo de Juárez. The municipality covers an area of 284.9 km^{2}. The municipality is located at 17°11′N 100°30′W, on the Pacific coast between Acapulco and Zihuatanejo. It is drained by the Río Atoyac.

As of 2005, the municipality had a total population of 14,444.

It was named in honour of 19th-century president and patriot Benito Juárez.
