= Huitzuco de los Figueroa =

Municipality in the Mexican state of Guerrero

- Municipality
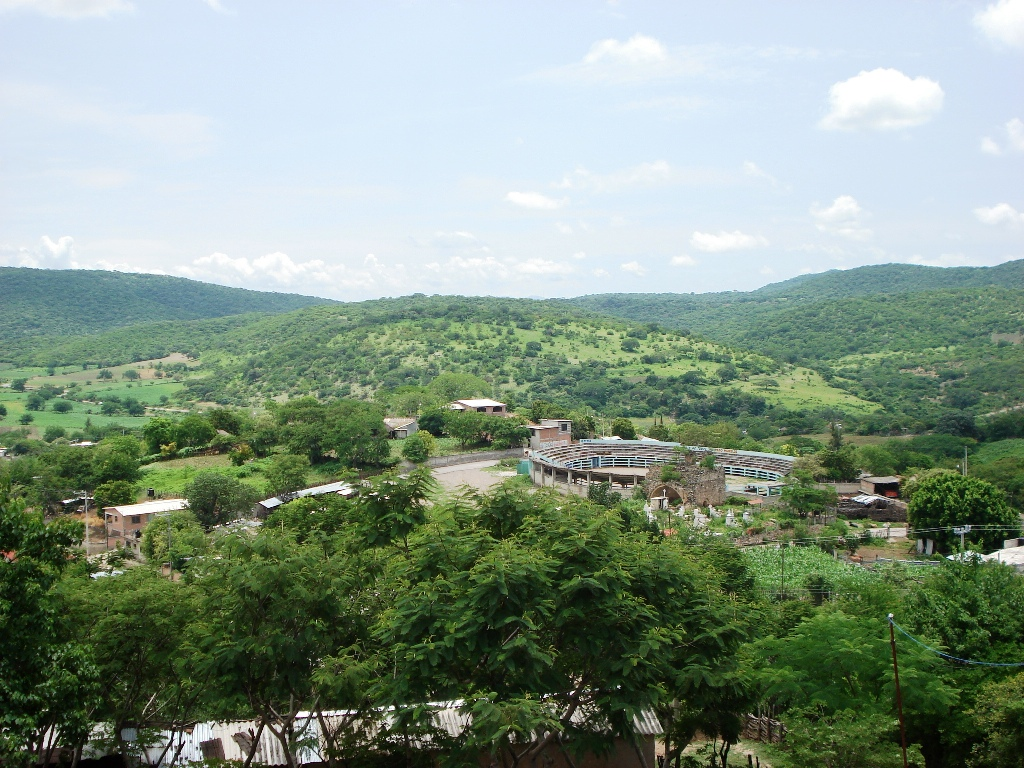

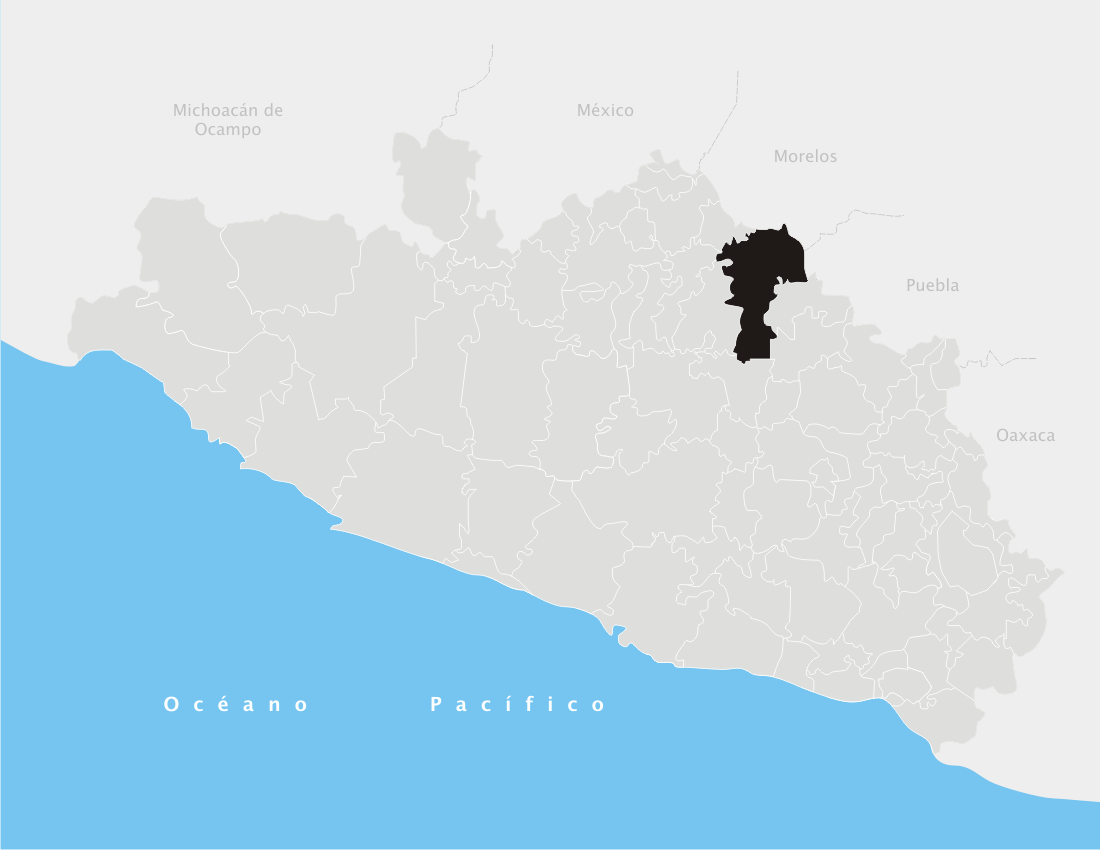
- Municipality of Huitzuco de los Figueroa in Guerrero

- Location in Mexico
- Coordinates: 18°29′N 99°05′W
- Country: Mexico
- State: Guerrero
- Municipal seat: Huitzuco

Area
  - Total: 921.9 km^{2} (355.9 sq mi)

Population (2005)
  - Total: 35,055

Huitzuco de los Figueroa is a municipality in the Mexican state of Guerrero. The municipal seat lies at Huitzuco. The municipality covers an area of 921.9 km^{2}.

As of 2005, the municipality had a total population of 35,055.
