= Coyuca de Benítez (municipality) =

Municipality in the Mexican state of Guerrero

- Municipality
- Coat of arms

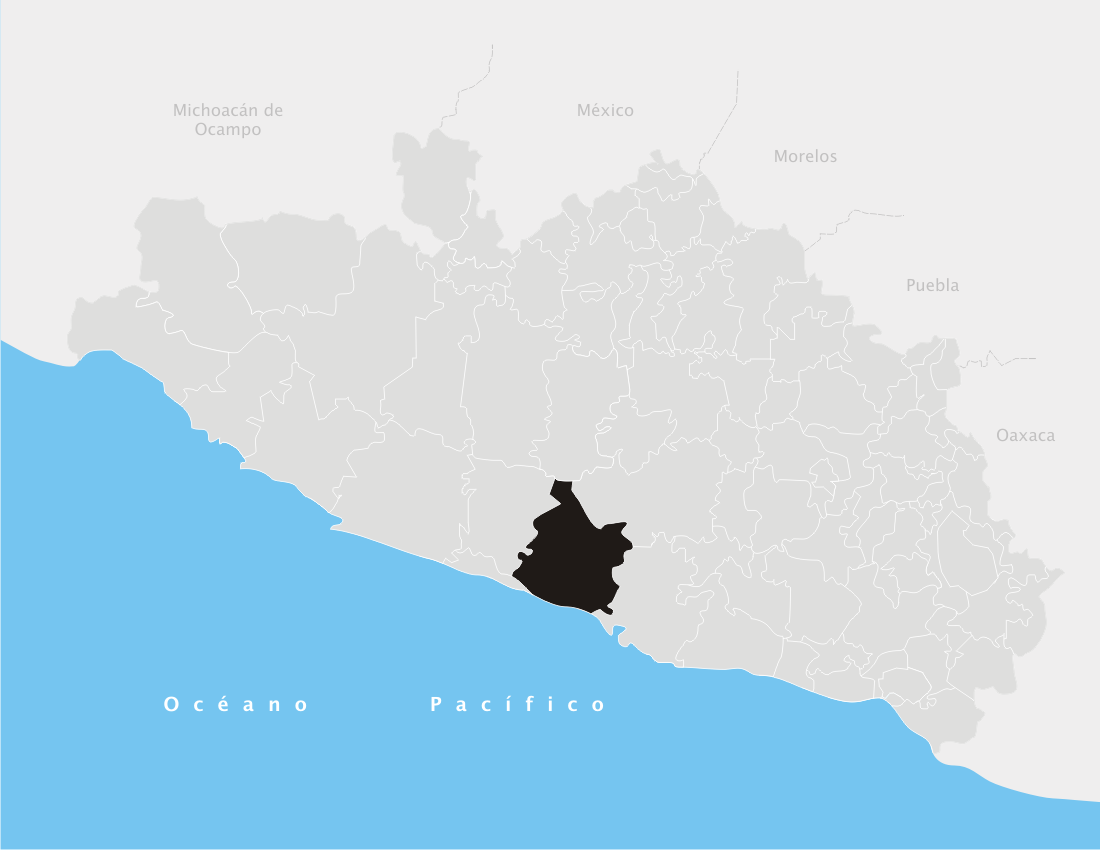
- Municipality of Coyuca de Benítez in Guerrero

- Location in Mexico
- Coordinates: 16°55′N 99°50′W
- Country: Mexico
- State: Guerrero
- Municipal seat: Coyuca de Benítez

Area
  - Total: 1,602.9 km^{2} (618.9 sq mi)

Population (2005)
  - Total: 69,064
- Time zone: UTC-6 (Zona Centro)
- Website: coyucadebenitez.gob.mx/

Coyuca de Benítez is a municipality in the Mexican state of Guerrero. The municipal seat lies at Coyuca de Benítez. The municipality covers an area of 1,602.9 km^{2}.

In 2020, the municipality had a total population of 73,056, up from 69,064 in 2005.
