= El Primer Instinto =

Album by Jaguares

Studio album by Jaguares
- Released: 22 October 2002
- Genre: Rock en español
- Length: Acoustic rock
- Label: RCA; BMG

Jaguares chronology
Cuando la Sangre Galopa (2001)	El Primer Instinto (2002)	Cronicas de un Laberinto (2005)

El Primer Instinto is an album recorded by Mexican rock band Jaguares. The album released on October 22, 2002 under the RCA and BMG labels. The album consists of rearranged songs from Caifanes and Jaguares, plus two new songs.

Jaguares are:

- Saul Hernández (lead voice and assistant guitar)
- Alfonso André (drums)
- César "El Vampiro" López García (main guitar)

Guest artists include David Hidalgo, Eduardo Hernández, José Hernández, Chucho Merchán, David Campbell, Mariachi Sol de México, and La Internacional Sonora Santanera. Jimmy Z Zavala harmonica, saxophone

== Track listing ==
No.	Title	Length
1.	"Quisiera ser alcohol" (original from El nervio del volcán)	5:59
2.	"No dejes que..." (original from El silencio)	3:58
3.	"Viento" (original from Caifanes)	3:36
4.	"Te lo pido por favor" (cover of Juan Gabriel)	3:26
5.	"Ojo de venado" (original from Caifanes)	3:15
6.	"Antes de que nos olviden" (original from El diablito)	4:38
7.	"Arriésgate" (Previously unreleased)	3:45
8.	"La vida no es igual" (original from Cuando la sangre galopa)	3:22
9.	"Mátenme porque me muero" (original from Caifanes)	3:57
10.	"La célula que explota" (original from El diablito)	3:39
11.	"La llorona" (original from El nervio del volcán)	3:53
12.	"Como tú" (original from Cuando la sangre galopa)	4:20
13.	"Imagíname" (original from El Equilibrio de los Jaguares)	4:52
14.	"Detrás de los cerros" (original from El Equilibrio de los Jaguares)	3:50
15.	"Fin" (original from Bajo el azul de tu misterio)	3:31
16.	"Por un beso" (original from Cuando la sangre galopa)	5:05
17.	"No importa" (Previously unreleased)	2:04

== Charts ==
Chart (2002)	Peak position
US Billboard 200	95
US Top Latin Albums (Billboard)	2

== Sales and certifications ==
Region	Certification	Certified units/sales
Mexico (AMPROFON)	Platinum	150,000^{^}
United States (RIAA)	Platinum (Latin)	100,000^{^}
^{^} Shipments figures based on certification alone.
