= Rostros Ocultos =

Mexican rock-pop band

Rostros ocultos
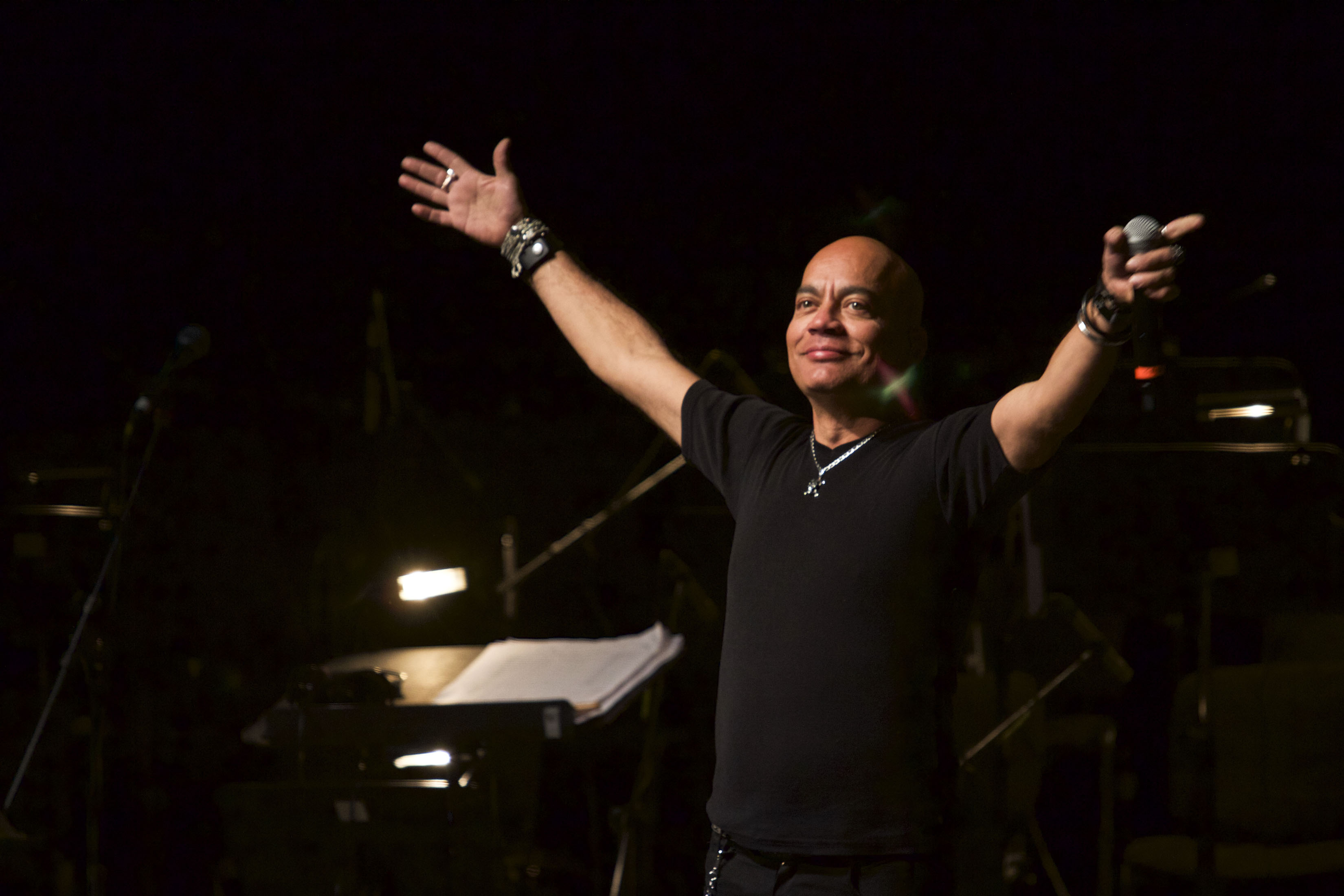

Background information
- Also known as: Los Clips, Rock'n Pills, Montana
- Origin: Guadalajara, Mexico
- Genres: Rock, pop
- Years active: 1985–present
- Labels: Comrock/WEA, EMI, Sony, Prodisk, Fonarte, Sony/BMG
- Members: Arturo Ybarra, guitar Cala Villa, vocals Bola Domene, drums Alfonso Martínez, bass
- Past members: Javier Barragan Fonseca; Alex Gonzales Orco; Cesar López "Vampiro"; Felipe Staiti; Jorge Corrales; Carlos García; Karlo Romero; Robert Monj; Abraham Calleros; Angel Baillo; Juan Maldonado Sinte; Victor Hugo Guardado "Chumino"; Andres Franco; Francisco Toyos; Juan Carlos Barraza; Jaime Regueira
- Website: rostrosocultos

Rostros Ocultos is a Mexican rock-pop band founded in 1985, who were moderately well known in the 80s. It was part of the post-movement started by Caifanes, and it was one of the bands that followed its principles, along with Santa Sabina, Neón, Fobia, El Tri, Kerigma and Maná, among others.

Its biggest success was the 1989 single El Final. Its singer's voice is considered one of rock en español's most representative.

== History ==
In 1984 Cala started a punk rock band called the Pills, with himself and Pablo Martinez on guitar, Quetzalcoatl Aviles on drums, and Victor Inda on bass.

=== Montana ===
In 1985, in the vibrant city of Guadalajara, two young musicians set out to make their mark on the Spanish-language rock scene. Arturo Ybarra, a talented guitarist with a résumé that included the bands Mask and TRAX, joined creative forces with Agustín Villa—known to fans as Cala—whose dynamic vocal work with Los Clips and Rock'n Pills had already garnered attention. Together, they envisioned a band that would reflect their lives, capturing the dreams, loves, heartbreaks, and raw experiences of their generation.

They created a band called Montana, taking the name from a new brand of cigarettes. They were joined by drummer Abraham Calleros (formerly of Sombrero Verde), keyboardist Andrés Franco (formerly of Mask), and bassist Victor "Chino" Inda (formerly of Los Clips) and quickly became synonymous with a fresh and gritty sound. They were signed by WEA and released their first album, Quiero Más, in 1985, introducing a refreshing and authentic sound. Songs such as "Quiero Más" and "Quisiera Que Estuvieras Aquí" resonated with listeners, offering a blend of lyrical depth and melodic innovation. Montana's music not only reflected the personal stories of its creators but also connected deeply with a generation seeking anthems for their own stories.

The music of the period can be found on the 1984 Comrock album, which featured Ritmo Peligroso, Punto y Aparte, Kenny y los Eléctricos, Mask and Los Clips.

=== Rostros Ocultos ===
With a new name in 1986, the band started over as Rostros Ocultos.

They signed a contract with EMI to record Disparado in 1987, from which they released the singles Mujer desechable and El último adiós, then in 1989 they put out Abre tu corazón. Here they covered the Los Clips single El final. This production had the participation of Alejandra Guzmán, Andrés Calamaro and Kenny, and they began to play across the country with much recognition. Then the group took a break and the leaders of the band decided to start separate projects. Arturo recorded a gospel album titled Luz aquella, and Cala put out a solo project called Con huevos y cajeta (1994).

In 1997, at the request of label, they decided to get together again as Rostros Ocultos and release Dame una razón. They recorded Disparado, Abre tu corazón, Músicos, poetas y locos and Dame una razón on the EMI label. With these productions, they left an indelible mark on rock en español.

In 2001, its fifteenth anniversary, the group decided to record 15 Celebración, a compilation of their best songs, for the Sony Music label. This celebration had the participation of

- Aleks Syntek
- Marciano Cantero of Enanitos Verdes
- Álex Lora of El Tri
- Benny Ibarra
- Sara Valenzuela of La Dosis
- José Fors of Cuca
- Kazz of Los Amantes de Lola
- Hugo Rodríguez of Azul Violeta
- Alejandra Guzmán
- Kenny
- Carmín
- Héctor Quijada of La Lupita.

On this album the group had the following lineup:

- Agustin Villa Cala – vocals
- Arturo Ybarra – guitar and backup vocals
- Gerardo Matuz – drums
- Karlo Romero – percussion
- Jorge Corrales – keyboard and
- Alfonso Martinez – bass

The tour ended with a show in Guadalajara. They filled the Auditorio Benito Juárez with 15,000 people. Part of this celebration was the production of the video Dame una razón, directed by Sergio Ulloa, recognized photographer who went on to with René Castillo in the short film Hasta los huesos, which became a hit on the various video channels.

In 2002, based on the football career of Hugo Sánchez, they decided to compose a song titled Hugol and produced a video of it, produced and directed by a member of the band Karlo Romero, as a tribute to the best Mexican football player of all time. This release included an interactive CD, with highlights from the career of Hugo Sánchez and the history of Rostros Ocultos.

In 2003 with the experience of many years, Rostros Ocultos presented their new production on the Sony Music label, Renacer (to be reborn). With totally unreleased cuts, Renacer began a new cycle for the band and a new image. The group went on a large tour in and out of the country. The primary objective of the group was a message to all their fans and the general community about the importance of organ donation, to give live after life. So they included a song in this material titled Corazón about a little girl born with a very weak heart who is waiting for a heart transplant. Also, they added a sticker that promotes organ donation and an authorization card for those who are interested in becoming organ donors.

Alex González, the drummer for Maná, participated on the album, adding input to the song Ya no quiero verte más as did the maestro of rock en español Miguel Ríos, on a special version of Santo y diablo. The first single from the soundtrack of the film Santos diablos. This piece speaks of the duality of being human, of the discernment of good from evil. The video for this first single was produced by Praxis, a Mexican company specializing in 3D animation. It was recorded in Guadalajara, with post-production in Miami.

Their most recent production was filmed and recorded in the legendary Teatro Diana in Guadalajara and commemorates their 25-year career and lasting popularity. Participants in this production, titled 25 Aniversario, included their friends and musical colleagues: Jose Fors and Galileo Ochoa of (Cuca), Jaffo (Plastiko), Kenny Aviles, Jovito pantera (Garigoles) and the disbanded tapatio group Poetas en el Exilio.

== Members ==
=== Original lineup (1985) ===
- Cala de Villa, vocals
- Arturo Ybarra, guitar
- Víctor Inda, bass
- Abraham Calleros, drums
- Andrés Franco, keyboard
- Robert Monj

=== Current lineup ===
- Arturo Ybarra, guitar
- Cala Villa, vocals
- Bola Domene, drums
- Alfonso Martínez, bass

=== Former members ===
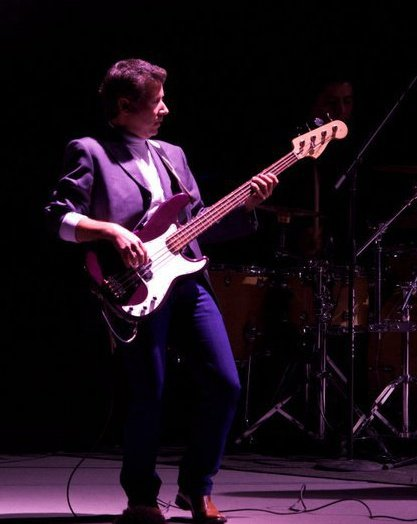
Francisco Toyos

- Javier Barragan Fonseca, bass
- Alex Gonzales Orco, drums – Azul Violeta
- César "Vampiro" López – Jaguares
- Felipe Staiti – Enanitos Verdes
- Jorge Corrales, keyboards – Playa Limbo
- Carlos García, drums – Indp
- Karlo Romero, drums – Producer Negra Records
- Robert Monj, drums – Mentes secretas
- Abraham Calleros, drums – former member of Maná
- Angel Baillo – Playa Limbo
- Juan Maldonado Sinte – Ind
- Victor Hugo Guardado "Chumino", bass – Los afro brothers
- Andres Franco, keyboard
- Francisco Toyos, bass – 90-92/95-97
- Juan Carlos Barraza, guitar – Mexicali – Quererte mas 93–95
- Jaime Regueira, bass

=== Guest musicians ===
- Andrés Franco, keyboards
- Juan Pablo Harfush, guitar
- Christian Gómez, drums
- Robert Monj, drums
- Tu papi el Neo Voice principal

== Discography ==
=== Montana ===
- Quiero Más WEA (1985)

=== Rostros Ocultos ===
==== Studio albums ====
- 1987: Disparado – EMI
- 1989: Abre tu corazón – EMI
- 1992: Divididos Rockotitlán
- 1995: Músicos, poetas y locos – EMI
- 1997: Dame una razón – EMI
- 2001: 15 Celebración – Sony
- 2004: Renacer – Sony
- 2007: En vivo Hard Rock Live (DVD/CD) – Prodisc
- 2009: Once : Once – Fonarte/JMV
- 2013: 25 Aniversario – Fonarte Latino
- 2016: Monstruos – Fonarte Latino
- 2016: Rock sinfonico en tu Idioma – Sony/BMG

=== Individual discography ===
Agustín Villa "Cala":

- Cala Con huevos y cajeta EMI 1994

Arturo Ybarra:

- Luz Aquella Destino la eternidad Rhema records 1997
- Luz Aquella Levanta tus alas Rhema records 2006
- Luz Aquella DVD en vivo HRL rhema records 2007
- Luz Aquella Dias de luz Rhema Records 2009
- Forseps V Cultura U.De G. 2010
- Opera Frankestein 2011
- Jose Fors Reproducciones volumen 1 – 2012
- Forseps 6 – 2013
