= Hip Hop Hoodíos =

American hip hop group

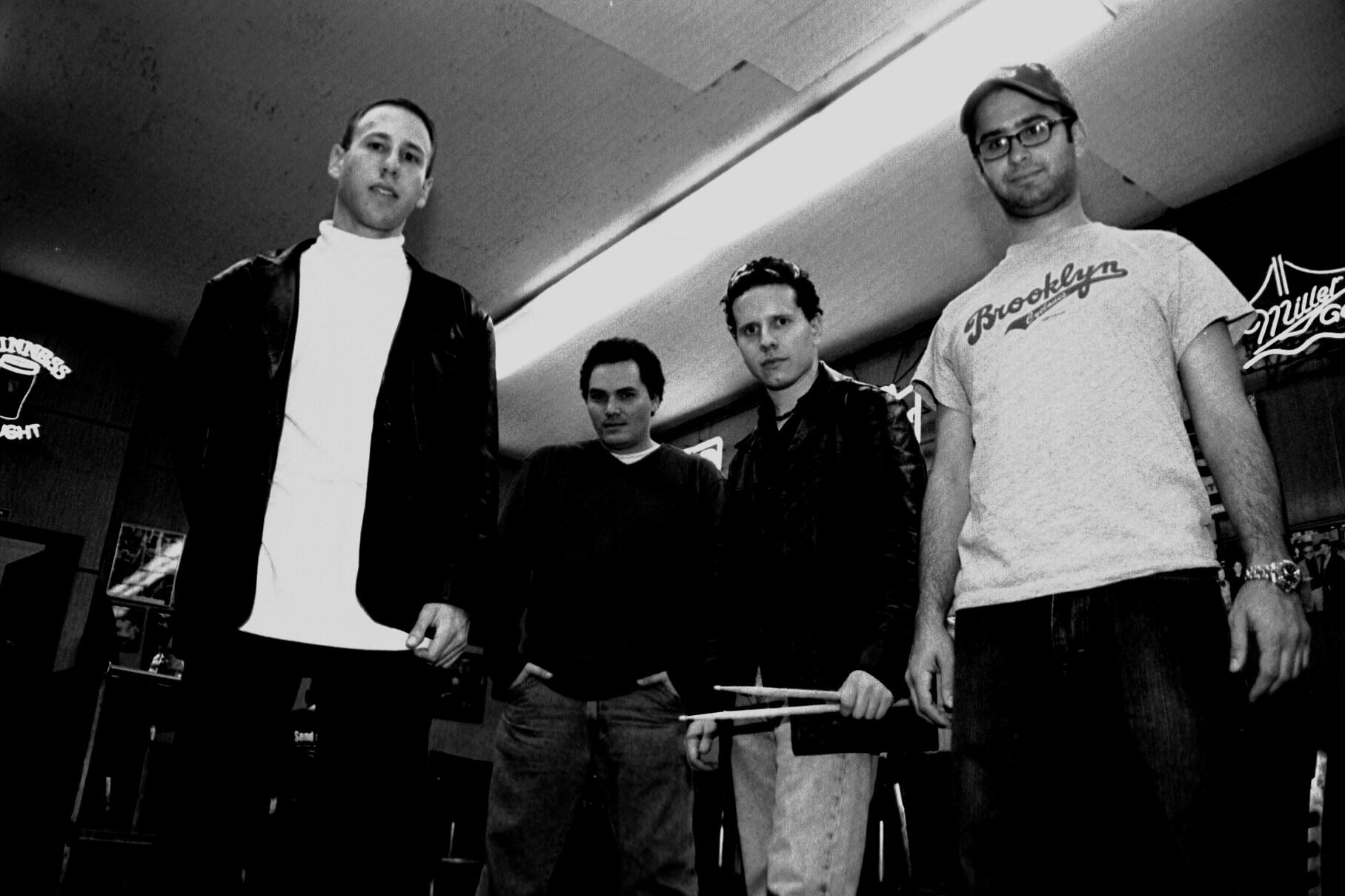
Hip Hop Hoodíos at Katz's Deli. NYC, 2002.

The Hip Hop Hoodíos (from Spanish judíos = Jews) are a multilingual Latin hip-hop and alternative band. Founded in 2001 in Brooklyn, NY, the group is now bi-coastal and based in California and New York. They are composed of Josué Noriega (born Josh Norek), Abraham Vélez, and Federico Fong (former member of La Barranca, Jaguares and Caifanes).

Their 2002 debut EP 'Raza Hoodía' contains three songs based on different Latin styles as well as rock en español ("Ocho Kandelikas" being co-written by Juan Manuel Caipo from Orixa) and rap music; and two more rap-oriented tracks, including "Dicks & Noses." The video for "Ocho Kandelikas" received heavy airplay on MTV Tr3s. The 2005 full-length 'Agua Pa' La Gente' album features guest artists Frank London (The Klezmatics) and Paul Shapiro (Brooklyn Funk Essentials). Following the 'Viva La Guantanamera' EP in 2007, Hip Hop Hoodíos released the compilation 'Carne Masada: Quite Possibly The Very Best of Hip Hop Hoodíos,' which also featured three previously unreleased tracks. After a ten year retirement, Hip Hop Hoodíos resurfaced in 2019 as essentially a solo act led by Josh Norek in collaboration with prominent guests including Pato Machete of Control Machete, Mexican Institute of Sound, Santi Mostaffa and Hip Spanic Allstars.

The group has collaborated with several Grammy-winning artists, including members of Ozomatli, Jaguares and The Klezmatics. In 2022, Hip Hop Hoodíos' single "Knishin' In the Mission" was chosen by The Forward as one of 'The 150 Greatest Jewish Pop Songs of All Time." 1

Hip Hop Hoodíos' music has been featured in television shows, movies and video games. Most recently the song "Times Square (1989)" was included in Only Murders in the Building (season 4, episode 1) and the motocross game Riders Republic.

== Discography ==
- 2002 Raza Hoodía EP (JN Media)
- 2005 Agua pa' la gente (Jazzheads)
- 2007 Viva la Guantanamera EP (Nacional Records)
- 2009 Carne Masada: Quite Possibly the Very Best of Hip Hop Hoodíos (Jazzheads)
- 2019 Knishin' In The Mission - single
- 2020 Turn Back The Clock (Hoodíos Latinos) - single
- 2020 Mexican Miller (The Stephen Miller Song) - single
