= José Manuel Aguilera =

Mexican composer and guitarist

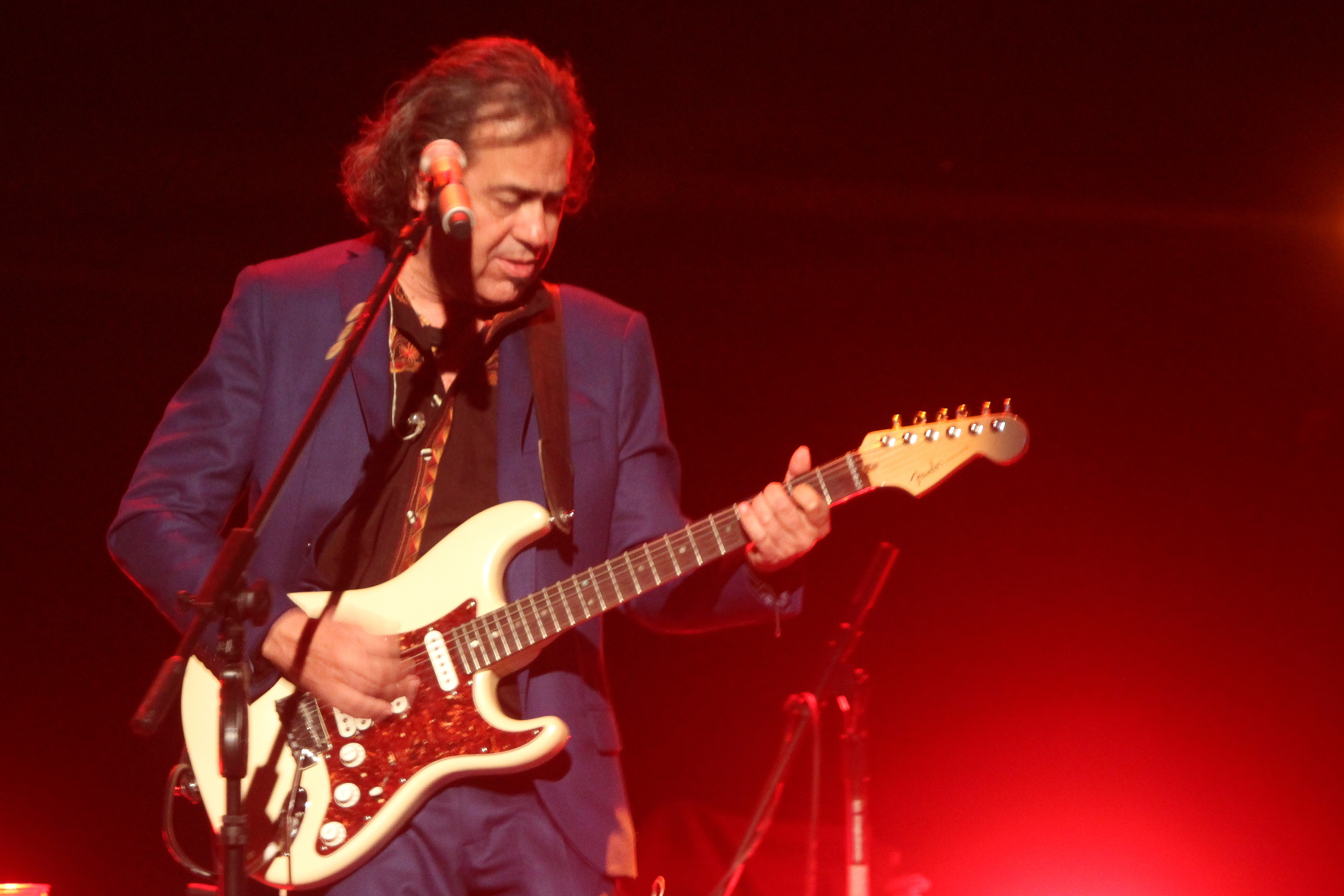

Background information
- Born: José Manuel Aguilera; February 14, 1959 (age 67); Guadalajara, Mexico
- Genres: Rock; Rock en español; Mexican rock
- Occupations: Musician, guitarist, songwriter, singer
- Instruments: Vocals, guitar
- Years active: 1981–present
- Member of: La Barranca
- Formerly of: Sangre Asteka; La Suciedad de las Sirvientas Puercas; Nine Rain; Caifanes; Jaguares

José Manuel Aguilera (born 14 February 1959, in Guadalajara, Mexico) is a Mexican guitar player, singer and composer. He has been part of bands such as Sangre Azteka, Nine Rain and Jaguares. He is the founder and leader of rock band La Barranca. He has also collaborated with artists such as Julieta Venegas, Cecilia Toussaint, Ely Guerra y Lila Downs.

== Career ==
Aguilera started playing with his cousins and guitarist Luis Arteaga in the band El Fracaso (The Failure) in the area of Ciudad Satélite, Mexico City. In 1986 he was part of the audience in the first gig of the band Sangre Asteka, in the Museo Universitario del Chopo. The next year accordionist Humberto Alvarez invited Aguilera to join Sangre Asteka.

In 1994 Aguilera recorded the album Odio Fonky: tomas de buró with Mexican singer and songwriter Jaime López, which has achieved a cult status in Mexican rock. The album has blues, folk and Danzón influences and consists of 16 songs, including the classic Chilanga Banda, which was covered by Café Tacuba in Avalancha de Exitos. Hugo García Michel, writing in Nexos, described Odio Fonky as: "... an eminently urban work, with a taste of pavement, neon lights, vehicular traffic, rough neighborhoods, street soccer, homeless people and scavengers, office workers and secretaries and students and housewives, canteens with stained floors, seedy bars and dives, bucolic parks with yellowish trees, atmospheric and visual pollution, fog, alcohol and bohemianism, the slow rush to get nowhere."

Aguilera was part of the initial line up of Jaguares, alongside Saúl Hernández and Federico Fong. He recorded their first albúm, El Equilibrio de los Jaguares, released in 1996 and went in one tour with the band. According to Enrique Lopetegui from the Los Angeles Times, Aguilera's guitar gave Jaguares most of their edge.

In 1994 Aguilera and Fong had started La Barranca, and focused on this band after El Equilibrio de los Jaguares. According to Aguilera, La Barranca is part of the tradition of popular Mexican music, exemplified by composers such as Agustín Lara, Álvaro Carrillo y José Alfredo Jiménez. They released their first album "El fuego de la noche" in 1996 and then "Tempestad" in 1997.

Aguilera's music and lyrics have been influenced by literature and film, for example Mexican writer Juan Rulfo, but also Japanese authors such as Yukio Mishima, Yasunari Kawabata and director Akira Kurosawa.
