= Kenny y los Eléctricos =

Rock band founded by Kenny Aviles in 1980

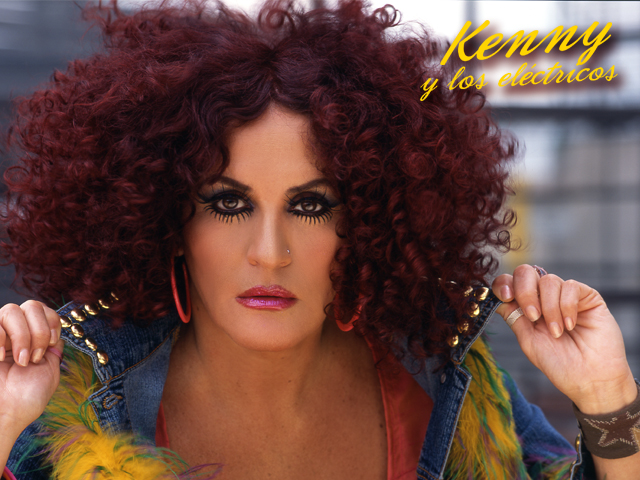
- Kenny Aviles

Background information
- Also known as: Kenny and the Eléctrics, Kenny y los nuevos Eléctricos
- Origin: Los Angeles, California, U.S.
- Genres: Rock, pop
- Years active: 1980–present
- Labels: Comrock/WEA, Fonovisa, Discos y Cintas Denver, Opcion Sonica
- Members: Kenny Aviles (vocals, acoustical guitar, harmonicas); Edgar Carrum (bass guitar); Vladimir Vuković (drums); Memo McFly (guitar); Jorge Wash (keyboards)
- Past members: Ricardo Ochoa (guitar); Sabo Romo; Aleks Syntek; Alejandro Marcovich; Roberto Bañuelos “Beto Bomba”; Alejandra Guzmán
- Website: www.kennyyloselectricos.com

Kenny y los Eléctricos is a rock band founded in 1980 by the singer and band leader Kenny Aviles, who has been called "the mother of Mexican rock". The band started in Los Angeles, where they made their first public appearances under the name Kenny and The Electrics, playing in venues like Whisky a Go Go. They moved back to Mexico in 1980 and went on to be considered an internationally important Mexican rock band, emblematic of Mexican rock in the 1980s.

Aviles has been called the Mexican Pat Benatar and one of the most-important women in Mexican rock.

Throughout its history, the lineup of the band continuously changed. In 1990, the band broke-up completely, leaving Aviles as a solo act. A new band called Kenny y los Nuevos Eléctricos formed in 1995. The band took back its original name in 2000.

== Biography ==
=== 1980s ===
The band formed in Los Angeles in 1980, appearing as Kenny and the Electrics in area venues. That year they moved to Mexico, where band members were born, to seek their roots and to be able to express themselves in Spanish. Rock music at this time was met with disapproval and performances were often relegated to what were known as hoyos funquis (funky holes). Kenny y los Eléctricos became known on this scene.

Kenny y los Eléctricos recorded their first album, Electrimanias, in 1981 on independent label New Age Records. Around this time new venues began to appear in Mexico. The band performed at Satellite Rock along with Ritmo Peligroso, Chac-Mool, Botellita de Jerez and Taxi and at Rockotitlán along with bands like Caifanes, Santa Sabina, Rostros Ocultos and Fobia.

In 1983, the band recorded an album with Chela Braniff, Juan Navarro and Ricardo Ochoa on the independent Comrock label. Ochoa, a former member of Peace and Love, then Kenny's guitarist, produced the album. The music of the bands in the Comrock compilations "became the fodder for the childhood of groups like Café Tacuba, whose members were beginning to imagine a pop cultural future as hip as the north but tinged with Mexican flavor."

The band modified their name to Kenny y los eléctricos in 1986, and produced the album Juntos por el Rock 1995 with singles Me Quieres Cotorrear and A Woman in Love. By 1988, big labels were eyeing the success of rock en español (rock music featuring Spanish lyrics) and began seeking out artists representing Mexican rock. The band recorded No huyas de mi for Discos Melody (engineered by Juan Switalski and produced by Ochoa, with lyrics by Ochoa, Kenny and Aleks Syntek), featuring musicians Jorge "Chiquis" Amaro, Sabo Romo, Aleks Syntek, Alfonso André and Federico Fong. This record became a classic of Mexican rock and one of the most-played selections in bars, clubs and disco parties.

=== 1990s ===
Discos Denver put out a record of previously released material, Toda la noche sin parar, in 1992. The following year, Kenny recorded the album Si no estás aquí with the singles Si no estas aquí and Satisfáceme si puedes.

The band formed the lineup of Kenny y Los Nuevos Eléctricos in 1995 after meeting Edgar Carrum. In 1999, the band recorded an electrical acoustic concert, Sensaciones Electroacústicas, defining a new sound for the band in the coming decade.

=== 2000s ===
The band released the album Alma Beta with the single Dicen por ahi, which quickly charted and was named the best rock ballad of 2000 and one of the band's most-representative songs. In 2002, they released re-mastered material on La Historia 1980–2000.

In 2003, the band recorded the live album Kenny Fest at Rockotitlan in Mexico City with musicians including Leonardo de Lozanne, Piro, and Alejandro Marcovich. The following year, they released the DVD La Reina del Rock with footage from the Sensaciones electroacústicas and Kenny Fest concerts, and other videos.

The band released the 2005 album Sicodelia with the single Puro amor. In 2008, they released the album Con Tequila en la Sangre, a fusion of mariachi music with rock which performed well. The album tour covered Mexico, the US and Germany, including concerts in Hamburg and Berlin.

=== 2010s ===
The band released the original album Sex y Rock & Love in 2010.

In 2013, the band recorded the concert album Otra sensación Concierto electroacústico, featuring mariachi-rock versions of classical guitar themes and guest musicians. In 2014, they released a double-album in the US and Canada, Los jefes del rock mexicano volume 1, with compiled material and the unplugged Otra Sensacion concert. The album is considered the most representative record of the indie Latin movement.

The band celebrated its 35th anniversary in 2015, with concerts featuring guest musicians from different periods of the band's career, including Alfonso André of the Jaguares, Armando Palomo of Botellita de Jerez, Avi Michel of Ritmo Peligroso and Baby Batiz. They performed a concert tour in the US, and the band expressed support for a proposed museum of Mexican rock in Coahuila.

== Discography ==
- Electrimanías, 1982
- Juntos por el Rock, 1983
- No Huyas de mí, 1988
- Toda la noche sin parar, 1992
- Si no estás aquí, 1993
- Sensaciones electroacústicas, 1999 concert
- Alma Beta, 2000
- La Historia 1980–2000, 2002 compilation
- Kenny Fest, live album, 2003
- Sicodelia, 2005
- Con Tequila En La Sangre, (U.S.A. & MÉXICO) 2008
- Sex y Rock & Love, 2010
- Otra sensación: Unplugged, 2013
- Los jefes Del Rock mexicano 2014 (only U.S.A.)

=== Video ===
- La Reina del Rock, DVD, 2004

== Members ==
Current lineup:

- Kenny Aviles – vocals
- Edgar Carrum – bass guitar
- Memo McFly – lead guitar
- Vladimir Vuković – drums
- Jorge Wash - keyboards

Previous collaborators:

- Ricardo Ochoa
- Victor Illaramendy
- Sabo Romo
- Aleks Syntek began his career with the band
- Lino Nava
- Alejandro Marcovich
- José Manuel Aguilera
- Javis le Revo
- Arturo Ibarra
- Julio Diaz
- Alejandra Guzmán
- Felipe Staiti
- Jorge "Chikis" Amaro

== See also ==
- Music of Mexico
- Rock music in Mexico
- Chicano rock
- La Onda
- Latino punk
- Nueva canción
- Rock en tu idioma
