= Crónicas de un Laberinto =

Studio album by Jaguares
- Released: 17 May 2005
- Genre: Rock en español
- Label: RCA; Sony BMG

Jaguares chronology
El Primer Instinto (2002)	Crónicas de un Laberinto (2005)	45 (2008)

Crónicas de un Laberinto is the fifth album recorded by Mexican rock band Jaguares. The LP was released on May 17, 2005 under RCA and Sony BMG.

Jaguares are:

- Saul Hernández (lead voice and assistant guitar)
- Alfonso André (drums, programming and sequences)
- César "Vampiro" López (main guitar)

Guest artists include: Adrian Belew (guitar, chorus, koto and keyboards), Federico Fong (bass), and Leonardo Muñoz (percussions and programming).

== Track listing ==
No.	Title	Writer(s)	Length
1.	"Bruja Caníbal"	Hernández	4:01
2.	"La forma"	Hernández	3:11
3.	"Tú Me Liberas"	André/Fong/Hernández/López	3:05
4.	"Fenómeno"	Hernández	3:43
5.	"Madera"	Hernández	3:00
6.	"Hay Amores Que Matan"	Hernández	3:13
7.	"Me Evaporo"	Hernández	4:13
8.	"Y Si"	Hernández	3:06
9.	"Todo Te Da Igual"	Hernández	3:14
10.	"Espejo"	Hernández	4:20
11.	"Ahí Aprendí"	Hernández	4:01
12.	"Mejor Será"	André/Fong/Hernández/López/Muñoz	4:38
13.	"Ya Te Quemaste"	André/Fong/Hernández/López/Muñoz	2:57
14.	"Está Muy Claro"	Hernández	5:08

== Sales and certifications ==
Region	Certification	Certified units/sales
Mexico (AMPROFON)	Gold	50,000^{^}
^{^} Shipments figures based on certification alone.
