= El nervio del volcán =

Studio album by Caifanes
- Released: June 29, 1994
- Recorded: February–April 1994
- Studio: O'Henry Sound Studios, Burbank, California
- Genre: Rock en español; Latin rock
- Length: 46:49
- Label: RCA; BMG
- Producer: Greg Ladanyi; Saúl Hernández; Alfonso André; Alejandro Marcóvich

Caifanes chronology
El Silencio (1992)	El nervio del volcán (1994)	La Historia (1997)

Singles from El nervio del volcán
- 1. "Afuera" Released: May 17, 1994; 2. "Aquí no es así" Released: October 12, 1994; 3. "Ayer me dijo un ave" Released: February 28, 1995

El nervio del volcán (The nerve of the volcano) is the fourth and final album by Mexican rock band Caifanes, released in the summer of 1994.

With bassist Sabo Romo and keyboardist Diego Herrera out of the band since the previous year, Saúl Hernández (vocals), Alfonso André (drums), and Alejandro Marcóvich (guitars) were the remaining band members left to record Caifanes' fourth studio album in Los Angeles, California between February and April 1994. The album included the hit singles "Afuera" and "Aquí no es así".

A tour began throughout Mexico, United States, Central America, Colombia, Chile, and Argentina, ultimately ending with the band dissolving on August 18, 1995 on their final show in San Luis Potosí, Mexico. Hernández later formed a new incarnation of his previous band, Jaguares, due to legal disputes and fallout with lead guitar Alejandro Marcóvich.

Guest artists included Graham Nash, Stuart Hamm, Federico Fong, Yann Zaragoza and Cecilia Toussaint.

== Track listing ==
All tracks are written by Saúl Hernández, except where noted.

No.	Title	Translation of Title	Length
1.	"Afuera"	Outside	4:48
2.	"Miedo"	Fear	3:37
3.	"Aquí no es así" (music: Alejandro Marcovich, Saúl Hernández, Alfonso André, lyrics: Hernández, Marcovich)	It's Not Like That Here	4:54
4.	"Ayer me dijo un ave"	Yesterday A Bird Told Me	3:29
5.	"Hasta que dejes de respirar" (music: André, lyrics: Hernández)	Until You Stop Breathing	4:09
6.	"Aviéntame"	Throw Me	4:32
7.	"El animal" (music: Marcovich, André, Hernández, Federico Fong, lyrics: Hernández)	The Animal	3:02
8.	"Quisiera ser alcohol"	Wish I Were Alcohol	5:09
9.	"Pero nunca me caí" (music: Marcovich, lyrics: Hernández)	Yet I Never Fell	4:12
10.	"El año del dragón"	The Year of the Dragon	3:47
11.	"La Llorona"	Crying Woman	5:10

== Personnel ==
=== Caifanes ===
- Saúl Hernández – vocals, 2nd rhythm guitar on "El año del dragón"
- Alejandro Marcovich – electric and acoustic guitars, EBow on "Miedo" and "La Llorona"
- Alfonso André – drums, percussion, drum programming on "Hasta que dejes de respirar"

=== Guests ===
- Federico Fong – fretted and fretless basses
- Yann Zaragoza – piano, Hammond organ, synthesizer (except on "Aquí no es así")
- Cecilia Toussaint – choirs on "Afuera", "Aquí no es así", and "Hasta que dejes de respirar"
- Lenny Castro – percussion
- Stuart Hamm – fretless bass on "Quisiera ser alcohol"
- Jerry Hey – trumpet on "Quisiera ser alcohol"
- Jerry Goodman – electric violin on "El animal" and "Pero nunca me caí"
- Graham Nash – harmonica on "Pero nunca me caí"
- Jeffrey "Marty" Vanston – synthesizer on "Aquí no es así" and "Ayer me dijo un ave"

== Certifications ==
Region	Certification	Certified units/sales
Mexico (AMPROFON)	2× Platinum+Gold	600,000^{‡}
^{‡} Sales+streaming figures based on certification alone.
