= Los Concorde =

Mexican alternative rock band

- Origin: Mexico City, Mexico
- Genres: Alternative rock; Latin alternative; Dance-rock
- Years active: 2006–present
- Label: Sony BMG
- Members: Leonardo de Lozanne; Jonás González; Alfonso Toledo; Mauricio Clavería; César López; Sabo Romo; Atto Attié; Ernesto Domene "Bola"
- Past members: Gustavo Limongi †
- Website: https://www.facebook.com/LosConcordeOficial/?locale=es_LA

Los Concorde is a Mexican alternative rock band that brings together well-known and experienced musicians, which is why it is considered a “supergroup.” The band allows members the freedom to come and go, with the only condition being that they leave their mark.

== History ==
It all began in mid-2006 when Mauricio Clavería, then drummer for La Ley, contacted Leonardo de Lozanne, vocalist of Fobia, and shared the idea of forming a band with an original sound, different from that of their respective groups. Later, he ran into Poncho Toledo, former bassist of La Lupita, at a Lucybell concert. They met up at Poncho Toledo’s “Xtudio” to talk, smoke, and enjoy some beers over several days, until everything started coming together naturally and the sound began to take shape. Some time later, they found Jonás, a member of Plastilina Mosh, at a B-Live show and told him about the project. Jonás was excited by the idea and joined the rest.

== Career ==
They released their first single, "Rompecabezas", which was very well received. At the time, it was part of an unnamed album with no other songs recorded yet. Thanks to the success of Rompecabezas, they were invited to perform at the Vive Latino 2007 festival. And so, without an album, with rushed rehearsals, new members joining, and just a few songs, they made their debut at Vive Latino on May 5, 2007. In 2008, they released their first album, "Región 4", produced by Poncho Toledo. The name refers to the phrase "es región 4," commonly used to describe something as a low-quality copy, reflecting the sarcastic humor that would become a hallmark of the group. The album sold 20,000 copies. On December 7, 2010, they presented their second album, "Es lo que hay", at the Teatro de la Ciudad in Mexico City, also produced by Poncho Toledo. The cover artwork once again reflected their signature sarcastic humor and the double meanings so characteristic of Mexican culture.

== Discography ==
- Región 4 (2008)
- Es lo que hay (2010)
