= Pa'l Norte =

Arts festival in Monterrey, Mexico

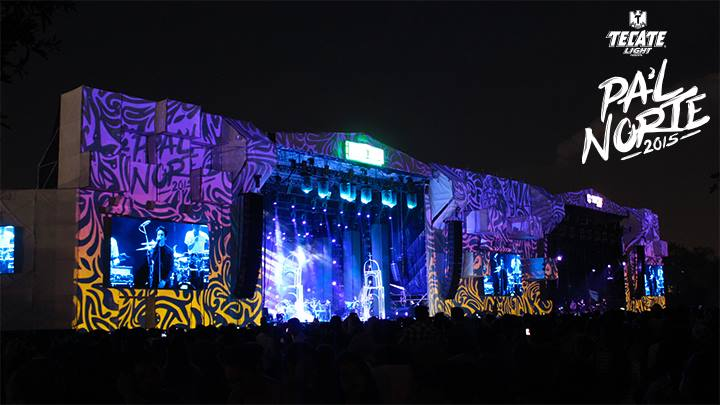
- Pa'l Norte 2015 Stage "Poderoso y Ascendente"
- Genre: Rock, pop, indie, hip hop, electronic dance music
- Dates: Early April
- Location: Fundidora Park
- Years active: 2012–present
- Attendance: 170,000 (2017)
- Organizer: Apodaca Group (also founder)
- Website: www.palnorte.com.mx

Pa'l Norte, known for sponsorship reasons as Tecate Pa'l Norte, is a music, art, and norteño traditional festival held every year since 2012, in Monterrey, Nuevo León. The event features some of the best of Latin America's most prominent talents. Pa'l Norte is considered to be one of the most popular music festivals within Latin America, and is one of the top-three most lucrative in México. As of 2022, the weekend brings the highest economic impact in the state of Nuevo León, making it a business hit for the state's tourism industry (including hotels, restaurants, nightlife, local tourism and transportation).

The event is organized by Apodaca Music Group, a group of highly regarded musicians, managers and festival-operators, overseeing other events such as Live Out Monterrey, Rock 'n Picnic, Fusión Ska, Friday Social Scene, Tough Mudder (México), and more.

Pa'l Norte's stages have showcased many well-known artists, bands and DJs of Latino and international origin, in addition to showcasing emerging talents. Some of the most notable performers at the festival have included Wisin & Yandel, Karol G, J Balvin, Farruko, Sebastian Yatra, Guaynaa, Muse, Arctic Monkeys, Kings of Leon, 311, Garbage, Franz Ferdinand, Maroon 5, Foo Fighters, Tame Impala, Bizarrap, Snow Patrol, Good Charlotte, M.I.A., Nicky Jam, Queens of the Stone Age, Sech, Snoop Dogg, 50 Cent, Robin Schulz, The Killers, Jason Derulo, Two Door Cinema Club, José Madero, Enrique Bunbury, Los Fabulosos Cadillacs, Caifanes, Foster the People, Mon Laferte, Café Tacuba, Los Auténticos Decadentes, Zoé, Kinky, Plastilina Mosh, Calle 13, Los Amigos Invisibles, Julieta Venegas, Los Claxons, Panda, Piso 21, Mau y Ricky, La Ley, Tigres del Norte, Intocable, Jumbo, Juanes, Billie Eilish, The Offspring, Blink-182, Modest Mouse, Steve Aoki, Maná, Carlos Santana and many more.

Pa'l Norte is symbolized by its iconic lion emblem (which changes its design each year), its color and style matching with the festival's slogan "Siempre Ascendente" ("always rising"). This catchphrase was taken from the state of Nuevo León's heraldry, and is a philosophy the festival holds firm in improving on, year after year.

Fundidora Park, located in grounds that used to be owned by Fundidora de Fierro y Acero de Monterrey, in coordinates 25°40′41"N 100°17′00"O. It has access through Madero avenue and Fundidora, and is connected to the Macroplaza through Santa Lucía riverwalk lateral to two metro stations: Parque Fundidora and Y Griega. Another music festival that is hosted in this location is the Machaca Fest in the summer season.

== History ==
During much of 2012, Monterrey was brought to a stop due to major security issues around the city, and a festival with this kind of frequency and repercussions was non-existent. Based on the previous statements, Apodaca Music Group creates Pa'l Norte, inspired by pride and traditions of Northern Mexico held within an event that offers a unique experience for two successive days of live music with spectacular stages and diverse activities, such as: food trucks, Mercadito Pa'l Norte (marketplace), kermesse, official merchandise store, live bar (regional music) and more.

Starting with the 2013 edition, it incorporates Pa'l Mercado, a small marketplace that powers local products and entrepreneurs. This year also sees the creation of the "Surprise stage", where surprise artists make an appearance. This stage was opened up by La Ley.

2015 broke a record in economical outburst and hotel rooming of any month of April in the history of Monterrey, stated by the Secretariat of Tourism, leaving an economical impact of over 125 million pesos in Monterrey, Nuevo León.

== Festival summary by year ==
Edition	Year	Dates	Headliners	Gross revenues	Attendance or sales	Avg. daily attendance/sales
1st	2012	November 24	Calle 13; Zoé	—N/a	37,000 (sales)	
2nd	2013	November 9	Café Tacuba; Inna	—N/a	52,000 (sales)	
3rd	2014	October 31–November 1	Snoop Dogg; Zoé	—N/a	104,000 (sales)	
4th	2015	April 24–25	Imagine Dragons; Intocable; Molotov	—N/a	114,000 (sales)	
5th	2016	April 15–16	50 Cent; Caifanes	—N/a	134,000 (sales)	
6th	2017	March 31–April 1	The Killers; Maná	—N/a	170,000 (sales)	
7th	2018	April 20–21	Muse; Queens of the Stone Age	—N/a	210,000 (sales)	
8th	2019	March 22–23	Arctic Monkeys; Kings of Leon; Santana	—N/a	210,000 (sales)	
—	2020	Cancelled due to the COVID-19 pandemic.				
9th	2021	November 12–13	Foo Fighters; Tame Impala	—N/a	64,000 (sales)	
10th	2022	April 1–2	The Strokes; Maroon 5	—N/a	160,000 (sales)	
11th	2023	March 31–April 2	Billie Eilish; Twenty One Pilots; The Killers	—N/a	240,000 (sales)	
12th	2024	March 29–31	Blink-182; Imagine Dragons	—N/a	300,000 (sales)	
13th	2025	April 4–6	Green Day; Justin Timberlake; Olivia Rodrigo	—N/a	300,000 (sales)	
14th	2026	March 27–29	Tyler, the Creator; Guns N' Roses; The Killers	—N/a	300,000 (sales)	

== Attendance and event success ==
Within the last four years the event has been made, and the historical attendance of 114,000 people, Pa'l Norte 2016 is expected to reach 120,000 attendees and become the most successful festival in Mexico and Hispanic America.

== Tourism ==
Patricio González Aguirre, head of Corporate Tourism Development commented that Pa'l Norte 2012 "increased hotel occupation 11%, and exclusively in the Valle neighbourhood registered a 73% occupation, against the usual 58%".

In 2015, the festival broke the record for any April in the city's history in an economic growth of over 125 million pesos, note given by the Tourism Secretariat.

== See also ==
- Machaca Fest
