= Caifanes MTV Unplugged =

Live album by Caifanes
- Released: October 1995
- Recorded: Miami, Florida
- Studio: MTV Studios
- Genre: Rock en español
- Label: RCA; BMG

Caifanes chronology
El nervio del volcán (1995)	Caifanes MTV Unplugged (1995)	La Historia (History) (1997)

Caifanes MTV Unplugged is a live album by Mexican Rock band Caifanes released in 1995 as part of the MTV Unplugged series in which bands play their music in acoustic form for the MTV music channel. Caifanes plays its music, being the first Mexican band and the second Spanish speaking band (after Los Fabulosos Cadillacs), by participating in this series during the month of October in 1995.

== Track listing ==
1. Los Dioses Ocultos
2. El Animal
3. La Célula Que Explota
4. Nubes
5. Hasta Morir
6. Aquí No Es Así
7. Aviéntame
8. Miedo
9. Quisiera Ser Alcohol
10. Ayer Me Dijo un Ave
11. Afuera
12. La Negra Tomasa

== Curiosities ==
Two of the songs from this MTV Unplugged were included in the compilation album La Historia (Caifanes album).

- Aviéntame
- Miedo

During the guitar solo from the song 'Afuera', one of the strings from Alejandro Marcovich's guitar breaks, so he improvises a little his original solo towards the end of the song.
