= La Barranca =

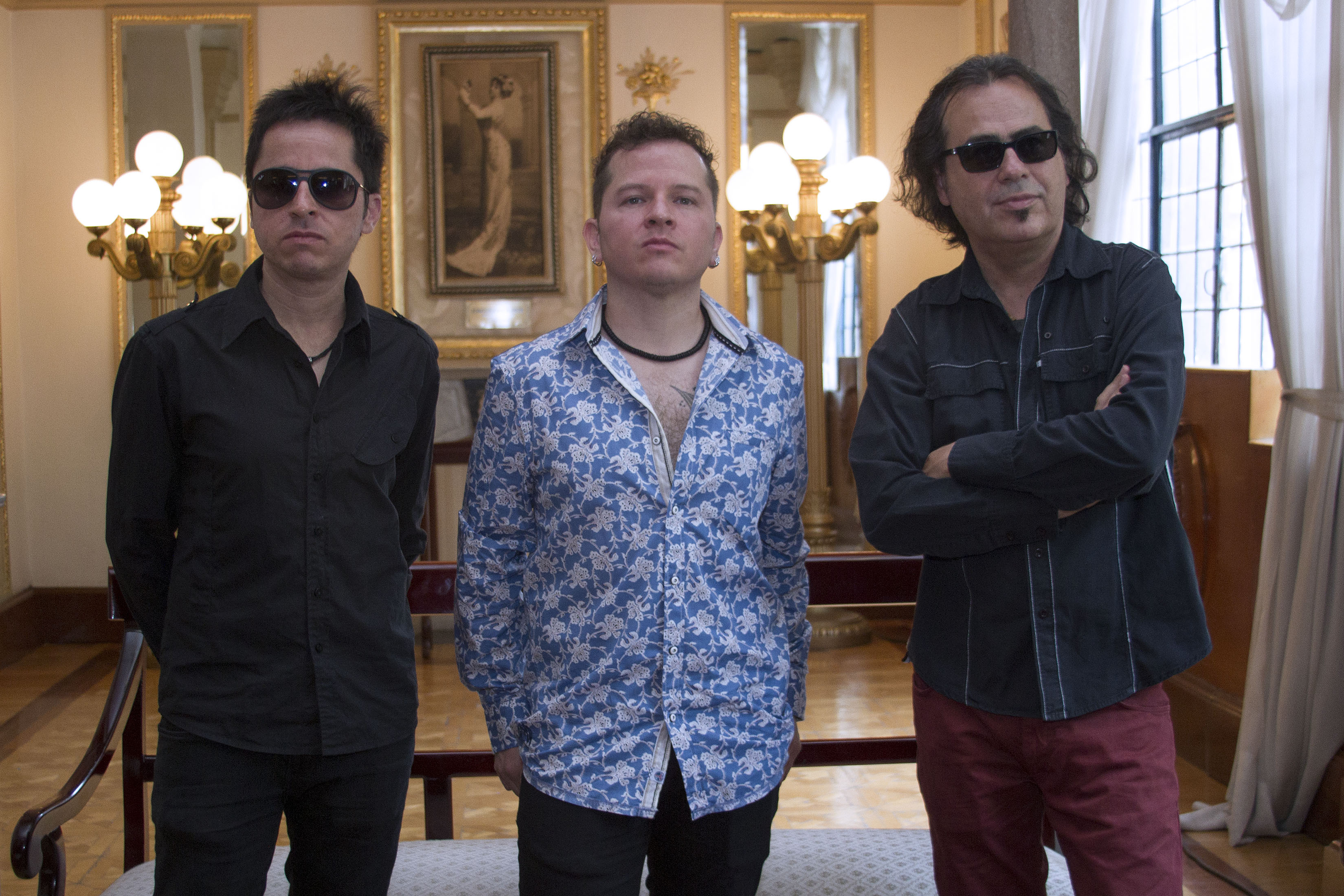
- Friday May 15, 2015. Press conference to announce the next concert La Barranca. The fire in memory. 20th anniversary, the current members of the group were present: José Manuel Aguilera, Adolfo Romero, Enrick Romero.

Background information
- Origin: Mexico City, Mexico
- Genres: Rock
- Years active: 1994–present
- Labels: OPCION SONICA-MCA; BMG-ARIOLA; UNIVERSAL-DISCOS MANICOMIO; MW RECORDS; FRACTAL RECORDS
- Members: José Manuel Aguilera (Guitar/Vocals); Ernick Romero (Bass); Alfonso André (Drums); Jorge "cox"Gaytan (Violin); Adolfo Romero (Guitar/Synthesizer); Ivan Solis (Drums) (playing occasionally)

La Barranca is a music group based in Mexico City. They are led by guitarist and songwriter José Manuel Aguilera, who previously and concurrently worked with Sangre Azteka, Jaguares, Cecilia Toussaint, Steven Brown/Nine Rain (Tuxedomoon), and more. After the original lineup—Aguilera, Federico Fong (bass), Alfonso Andre (drums), all of whom were guest members of Jaguares with former Caifanes frontman Saúl Hernández—went its separate ways, a second version of the band included Santa Sabina guitar virtuoso Alex Otaola and the rhythm section of brothers Jose María ("Chema") and Alonso Arreola. The band's sound moves from rock to fusion-ish jamming, with Mexican folk influence. On "El Fluir" the band decided to record live and to cut back on the keyboard and programmed additions to their music. "El Fluir" was their first US release since "Tempestad" in 1998. This edition was included a previously unreleased bonus track and a video for the first single "Pare de Sufrir".

In 2007, the group went on hiatus in order to find new management and to allow time for solo projects. José Manuel Aguilera released a second project with Jaime López titled "No más héroes, por favor". Bassist Alonso Arreola put out a mostly-instrumental album "LabA: Música horizontal" that features all the other La Barranca members as well as jazz musicians like Michael Manring, Trey Gunn, and David Fiucynski. Alex Otaola released a solo project (also featuring appearances from La Barranca and Santa Sabina musicians) titled "Fractales" in August 2007. The "Fractales" music comes with video portions as well. Drummer "Chema" Arreola began work on a book.

In June 2007, Alonso Arreola announced that the group could not agree on matters essential to continuing on and that he would be leaving the band. Although not speaking for his brother or Alex Otaola, he indicated that they would likely leave the band as well. He stated that this was an amicable split and that Aguilera would be welcome to continue with new members should he so choose to.

Subsequently, Aguilera announced via the www.labarranca.com.mx website that the original trio of Aguilera, Fong, and Andre would reunite for a new La Barranca album in 2008. This album is named "Providencia", it was sold at first only through the official website. Providencia was soon joined by a companion album "Construcción", a collection of instrumental outtakes and demo versions of the tracks of "Providencia".

== Discography ==
=== LP ===
- El fuego de la noche (1996, Opción Sónica-MCA).
- Tempestad (1997, BMG-Ariola).
- Rueda de los tiempos (1999, Universal-Discos Manicomio).
- Denzura (2003, MW Records).
- El Fluir (2005, Fractal Records).
- PЯOVIDEИCIA (2008, Louisiana Barranca).
- COИSTЯUCCIÓИ (2008, U. DE G).
- Piedad Ciudad (2010, Fonarte, Fonca).
- Eclipse de memoria (2013)
- Fatális (2015, Fonarte)
- Lo Eterno (2018, Fonarte)
- Nocturno (Remixes, 2020)
- Fragor (2020)
- Entre la Niebla (2020)
- Antimateria (2024)

=== EP ===
- Día negro (1997/BMG Ariola)
- Cielo protector (2004/La Barranca-Sanborns Hnos.)
