= Rock en tu idioma =

Former publicity campaign to promote Mexican, Argentinian, and Spanish rock music

Rock en tu idioma was a publicity campaign -- resulting in a series of rock albums -- initiated by the BMG Ariola music label, which other labels later also joined, to promote and distribute the music of Mexican, Spanish and Argentine bands. Between 1986 and 1991 the campaign was part of a musical movement in Latin America, and of the boom that arose from what became known as the Movida Madrileña.

The campaign's goal was to spread the music of rock bands in Spanish. It created compilation albums from the music of various artists who might not have gotten as much attention from a solo release. Several concerts were also organized to leverage the excitement.

The Rock en tu idioma albums were very popular in Mexico by the late 1980s, and included music from rock groups whose work would have been difficult to find elsewhere; many had not previously released an album and were quite unknown. The 15 años de Rock en tu idioma album distributed by BMG is a good example.

ROCK 101 was the station which first began playing rock in Spanish in Mexico, and produced a Miguel Ríos concert at the Plaza de Toros. Later, the Espacio 59 AM station broadcast Spanish-language rock only in the final three years of the 80s. This was critical to the success of Rock en tu idioma.

Rockotitlán was a venue where many of these groups played, located off the Insurgentes avenue (south) in Mexico City. Many bands got their start playing at this venue, of which several went on to obtain professional recording contracts. Bands like Maldita Vecindad, Fobia, Panteón Rococo, Los Amantes de Lola, Caifanes and others all played their early shows there.

== Groups ==
=== Argentina ===
- Enanitos Verdes
- Charly García
- G.I.T.
- La Torre
- Miguel Mateos
- Raúl Porchetto
- Soda Stereo
- Virus
- Miguel Cantilo
- Fricción
- La Joven Guardia (Félix Pando)
- Los Encargados

=== Mexico ===
- Alquimia (rock band)
- Asha (rock band)
- Bon y los Enemigos del Silencio
- Botellita de Jerez
- Caifanes
- Coda
- Culver
- Fobia
- Kenny y los Eléctricos
- La Cruz (band)
- Los Amantes de Lola
- Maldita Vecindad y los Hijos del Quinto Patio
- Maná, considered one of the most successful Mexican rock bands
- Neón
- Ritmo Peligroso
- Rostros Ocultos

=== Spain ===
- Alaska y Dinarama
- Danza Invisible
- Duncan Dhu
- Hombres G
- La Trinca
- La Unión
- Los Toreros Muertos
- Nacha Pop
- Orquesta Mondragón
- Radio Futura
- Miguel Ríos

== See also ==
- Argentine rock
- Rock en español
- Latino punk
- Avanzada Regia
