= El diablito =

Album by Caifanes

El Diablito

Studio album by Caifanes
- Released: June 19, 1990
- Recorded: October–November 1989
- Studio: Electric Lady Studios (New York City, New York)
- Genre: Post-punk; prog rock; alternative rock; Latin rock
- Length: 46:26
- Language: Spanish
- Label: RCA; BMG
- Producer: Cachorro López; Daniel Freibergh

Caifanes chronology
| Caifanes (1988) | El Diablito (1990) | El Silencio (1992) |

Singles from El Diablito (Volumen II)
- 1. "Detrás de ti" Released: May 21, 1990; 2. "La célula que explota" Released: September 1990; 3. "Los dioses ocultos" Released: January 1991

El Diablito (The Little Devil, which was originally to be called Volumen 2) is the second studio album by Mexican rock band Caifanes, released on June 19, 1990. Original members Saúl Hernández, Alfonso André, Sabo Romo, and Diego Herrera returned, along with a new guitar player, Alejandro Marcovich, who joined in September 1989.

== Track listing ==
All songs written by Saúl Hernández except where noted.

1. Detrás de ti (Behind You) (Saúl Hernández, Diego Herrera, Alfonso André) – 3:36
2. Antes de que nos olviden (Before We're Forgotten) – 4:45
3. La vida no es eterna (Life Isn't Eternal) (Bonus Track) – 3:54
4. De noche todos los gatos son pardos (At Night All Cats Are Brown) – 4:13
5. Sombras en tiempos perdidos (Shadows in Lost Times) – 5:52
6. El negro cósmico (The Cosmic Blackness) – 3:42
7. La célula que explota (The Exploding Cell) – 3:33
8. Aquí no pasa nada (Nothing Happens Here) (Bonus Track) – 4:37
9. Los dioses ocultos (The Hidden Gods) – 4:39
10. El elefante (The Elephant) – 3:00
11. Amárrate a una escoba y vuela lejos (Tie Yourself to a Broom and Fly Far Away) – 3:52

== Personnel ==
- Diego Herrera – saxophone, keyboards
- Sabo Romo – bass
- Saúl Hernández – vocals, guitar
- Alfonso André – drums
- Alejandro Marcovich – guitar

== Certifications ==
| Region | Certification | Certified units/sales |
|---|---|---|
| Mexico (AMPROFON) | Platinum | 250,000^{‡} |
^{‡} Sales+streaming figures based on certification alone.
