= Bajo el Azul de Tu Misterio =

Live album by Jaguares
- Released: 31 August 1999
- Genre: Rock en español
- Label: RCA; BMG
- Producer: Greg Ladanyi, Sabo Romo, Alfonso Andre, Saul Hernandez.

Jaguares chronology
El Equilibrio de los Jaguares (1996)	Bajo el Azul de Tu Misterio (1999)	Cuando la Sangre Galopa (2001)

Bajo el Azul de Tu Misterio is a two-disc album recorded by Mexican rock band Jaguares and was nominated for a Latin Grammy in 2000. The LP was released on September 7, 1999 under the label BMG Entertainment Mexico. The first disc is a live concert album (with some songs from Jaguares' first incarnation, Caifanes); the second disc is a studio album.

Two singles were released from this album, “Tu” and “Fin”, each with music videos.

== Track listing ==
All songs written by Saul Hernández.

Disc 1 (live)

1. Dime Jaguar (Tell me Jaguar) - 5:15
2. Cuentame tu vida (Tell me your life) - 5:16
3. Las ratas no tienen alas (Rats do not have wings) - 7:46
4. Ayer me dijo un ave (Yesterday, a bird told me) - 4:53
5. La celula que explota (The exploding cell) - 3:52
6. No dejes que... (Don't let...) - 5:23
7. Quisiera ser alcohol (I'd like to be alcohol) - 5:47
8. De noche todos los gatos son pardos (All cats are grey at night) - 7:50
9. El milagro (The miracle) - 4:10
10. Nos vamos juntos (We're off together) - 5:30
11. Amarrate a una escoba y vuela lejos (Tie yourself to a broom and fly far away) - 4:37

Disc 2 (studio)

1. Hoy (Today) - 5:22
2. Fin (End) - 4:27
3. Tu (You) - 4:23
4. Sangre (Blood) - 5:20
5. Parpadea (Blink) - 3:56
6. Derritete (Melt) - 4:46
7. Mantarraya (Stingray) - 5:55
8. Tu Reino (Your kingdom) - 4:48
9. Adios (Goodbye) (feat. string arrangements by David Campbell) - 5:13
10. No me culpes (Don't blame me) - 3:58

== Personnel ==
- Saul Hernández — vocals and rhythm guitar
- Alfonso André — drums
- Sabo Romo — bass
- Cesar "El Vampiro" López Garcia — lead guitar
- Jarris Margalli — lead guitar

== Sales and certifications ==
Region	Certification	Certified units/sales
Mexico (AMPROFON)	2× Platinum	300,000^{^}
^{^} Shipments figures based on certification alone.
