= Cuando la Sangre Galopa =

Studio album by Jaguares
- Released: 10 July 2001
- Genre: Rock en Español
- Length: 65:32
- Label: RCA; BMG

Jaguares chronology
Bajo el Azul de Tu Misterio (1999)	Cuando la Sangre Galopa (2001)	El Primer Instinto (2002)

Professional ratings
Review scores
Source	Rating
Allmusic	4/5 stars

Cuando la Sangre Galopa is an album recorded by Mexican rock band Jaguares. The LP was released on July 10, 2001 under the label BMG US Latin. It was nominated for Rock Album of the Year at the 2002 Lo Nuestro Awards.

== Track listing ==
All tracks are written by Saul Hernández, except where noted

No.	Title	Writer(s)	Length
1.	"Cuando la sangre galopa"	Hernández	5:17
2.	"El secreto"	Hernández	4:32
3.	"Como tú"		4:15
4.	"Estoy cansado"		4:47
5.	"En la Tierra"		4:38
6.	"La vida no es igual"		4:10
7.	"Por un beso"		6:20
8.	"Contigo"		3:54
9.	"El aislamiento"		3:54
10.	"Viaje astral"	Hernández/López	3:15
11.	"El momento"		5:02
12.	"El último planeta"	Hernández/López	3:30
13.	"¿Viejo el mundo?"		11:57
14.	"Dime de un amor que no ha sufrido" (hidden track)

== Personnel ==
- Saul Hernández (lead voice, guitar, bass guitar)
- Alfonso André (drums)
- Cesar “El Vampiro” López García (main guitar)
- Howard Willing (engineer)
- Peter DiRado (assistant engineer)
- David Campbell (arranger, orchestrator and conductor)

=== Guest musicians ===
Stuart Hamm, Chucho Merchán, Rubén Maldonado, Luis Conte, Alberto Salas, Patrick Warren, Greg Walls.

== Charts ==
Chart (2001)	Peak position
US Top Latin Albums (Billboard)	1

== Sales and certifications ==
Region	Certification	Certified units/sales
Mexico (AMPROFON)	Gold	75,000^{^}
^{^} Shipments figures based on certification alone.
