= 45 (Jaguares album) =

Studio album by Jaguares
- Released: 2 September 2008
- Genre: Alternative rock Indie rock General rock
- Label: EMI Latin

Jaguares chronology
Cronicas de un Laberinto (2005)	45 (2008)

45 is an album recorded by Mexican alternative rock band Jaguares.

The album was created by Saúl Hernández and Alfonso André in collaboration with Howard Willing. Recorded in Los Angeles and Mexico in June and produced in Nashville by Dave Thoenes. "Entre Tus Jardines", is the first single released.

== Trivia ==
The album's title, "45", refers to the approximately 45 million of people in Mexico who live in poverty. It is almost half of the country's population.

== Track listing ==
No.	Title	Length
1.	"Alquimista"	3:09
2.	"Lobo"	3:29
3.	"Entre Tus Jardines"	3:09
4.	"Viajando En El Tiempo"	5:29
5.	"Píntame"	3:59
6.	"Un Mal Sueño"	3:03
7.	"Visible"	4:35
8.	"A Través De La Pared"	4:17
9.	"Si Fuera Necesario"	5:47
10.	"Y Volví Para Creer"	8:15

Bonus tracks
No.	Title	Length
11.	"Kaliman"	4:05
12.	"Si Fuera Necesario" (Demo)	4:19

== Jaguares members credited in 45 ==
- Saúl Hernández (lead voice and rhythm guitar)
- Alfonso André (drums, programming and sequences)
- Cesar "El Vampiro" López (lead guitar)
- Marco Rentería (bass guitar)
- Diego Herrera ( keyboards )

== Sales and certifications ==
Region	Certification	Certified units/sales
Mexico (AMPROFON)	Gold	40,000^{^}
^{^} Shipments figures based on certification alone.
