= La Historia =

La Historia (The History) may refer to:

- La Historia (Caifanes album)
- La Historia (Intocable album)
- La Historia (Kumbia Kings album)
  - La Historia (Kumbia Kings video album), a video by A.B. Quintanilla and Kumbia Kings
- La Historia (Ricky Martin album)
- La Historia Live, an album by Hector & Tito
