= El Silencio (album) =

Studio album by Caifanes
- Released: May 29, 1992
- Recorded: 1991–1992
- Studio: Royal Recorders, Lake Geneva, Wisconsin
- Genre: Latin rock; alternative rock
- Length: 56:15
- Language: Spanish
- Label: RCA; BMG
- Producer: Adrian Belew

Caifanes chronology
El diablito (1990)	El Silencio (1992)	El nervio del volcán (1994)

Singles from El Diablito (Volumen II)
- 1. "Nubes" Released: April 1992; 2. "Para que no digas que no pienso en ti" Released: July 1992; 3. "No dejes que..." Released: November 1992

Professional ratings
Review scores
Source	Rating
AllMusic	3/5 stars

El Silencio (The Silence) is a studio album by Mexican rock band Caifanes, released in 1992. It was produced by Adrian Belew. It is the last Caifanes album to feature bassist Sabo Romo and keyboardist/saxophonist Diego Herrera.

== Critical reception ==
Spin called the album a "heavenly hybrid of Roxy Music and Led Zeppelin." Chuck Eddy wrote that it "flows through cotton-candy high notes, rumbling ocean rhythms with upsurges that bellow like sea elephants, Salvation Army funeral-wake honking, stuttery little chamber-group guitar figures."

== Track listing ==
All tracks are written by Saúl Hernández, except where noted

No.	Title	Lyrics	Music	Translation of Title	Length
1.	"Metamorféame"	Hernández	Alfonso André, Diego Herrera, Sabo Romo, Alejandro Marcovich, Hernández	Metamorphose Me	2:43
2.	"Nubes"	Hernández	Marcovich, Hernández, Romo	Clouds	4:33
3.	"Piedra"	Hernández	Herrera, Hernández	Stone	4:36
4.	"Tortuga"	Hernández	Marcovich, Herrera	Turtle	4:36
5.	"Nos Vamos Juntos"			We Go Together	5:06
6.	"No Dejes Que..."			Don't Let...	4:39
7.	"Hasta Morir"	Hernández	Marcovich, André	To the Death	3:44
8.	"Debajo de Tu Piel"			Under Your Skin	3:29
9.	"Estás Dormida"	Marcovich	Marcovich	You're Asleep	3:38
10.	"Miércoles de Ceniza"			Ash Wednesday	4:52
11.	"El Comunicador"			The Communicator	4:56
12.	"Para Que No Digas Que No Pienso en Ti"			So You Can't Say I Don't Think About You	3:55
13.	"Vamos a Hacer un Silencio"			Let's Make a Silence	5:15
14.	"Mariquita" (bonus track on CD release)	traditional	traditional	Ladybug	1:56

== Personnel ==
=== Caifanes ===
- Saúl Hernández - vocals, electric guitar
- Sabo Romo - electric bass, acoustic guitar
- Diego Herrera - keyboards, saxophone, percussion, jarana
- Alfonso André - drums, percussion
- Alejandro Marcovich - lead guitar, requinto jarocho, ebow

=== Guest ===
- Adrian Belew - guitar solo on "Piedra"

== Certifications ==
Region	Certification	Certified units/sales
Mexico (AMPROFON)	2× Platinum	500,000^{‡}
^{‡} Sales+streaming figures based on certification alone.
