= Caifanes (album) =

Studio album by Caifanes
- Released: August 28, 1988
- Recorded: December 1987 – February 1988
- Studio: Polygram Gil–Toussaint, GAS (Mexico City); Panda (Buenos Aires, Argentina)
- Genre: Post-punk; alternative rock; gothic rock; new wave
- Length: 33:28 (original 1988 LP); 45:56 (1993 CD re-release)
- Language: Spanish
- Label: RCA; BMG
- Producer: OscarLópez; Caifanes

Caifanes chronology
Caifanes (1988)	El diablito (1990)

Singles from Caifanes
- 1. "Mátenme porque me muero" Released: July 17, 1988; 2. "Viento" Released: October 24, 1988; 3. "La negra Tomasa" Released: December 4, 1988; 4. "Perdí mi ojo de venado" Released: April 9, 1989

Caifanes is the debut studio album by Mexican rock band Caifanes. It was released in 1988 after the success of their first singles, "Mátenme porque me muero" and "La bestia humana". The original release of the album did not contain the songs "La negra Tomasa" and "Perdí mi ojo de venado", which were released in 1989 as singles and later incorporated into the album when it was re-released on compact disc in 1993. It is undergoing a re-pressing process as of March 2011.

The LP is also referred to as Volumen 1 or Mátenme porque me muero.

== Track listing ==
All tracks are written by Saúl Hernández, except where noted. "La negra Tomasa" and "Perdí mi ojo de venado" are not on the original 1988 LP release

No.	Title	Writer	Length
1.	"Mátenme porque me muero" (Kill Me Because I'm Dying)		3:31
2.	"Te estoy mirando" (I'm Watching You)		3:44
3.	"La negra Tomasa" (The Black Woman Tomasa)	Guillermo Rodriguez Fiffe	7:55
4.	"Cuéntame tu vida" (Tell Me Your Life Story)		4:22
5.	"Será por eso" (Could That Be Why)		3:34
6.	"Viento" (Wind)		3:57
7.	"Nunca me voy a transformar en ti" (I'm Never Going to Turn Into You)		3:05
8.	"Perdí mi ojo de venado" (I Lost My Deer's Eye (Note: An "ojo de venado", literally "deer's eye", is a seed that in Mexico is used as a charm to protect against evil and tragedy.))		4:33
9.	"Amanece" (It's Dawning)	Diego Herrera	3:12
10.	"La bestia humana" (The Human Beast)		3:19
11.	"Nada" (Nothing)	Herrera	4:44
Total length:			45:56

== Personnel ==
=== Caifanes ===
- Saúl Hernández – vocals, guitar (except on "La bestia humana")
- Alfonso Andre – drums, miscellaneous percussion
- Sabo Romo – bass
- Diego Herrera – keyboards, saxophone

=== Additional musicians ===
- Gustavo Cerati – guitar on "La bestia humana"
- Cachorro Lopez – stick on "Nada"

== Certifications ==
Region	Certification	Certified units/sales
Mexico (AMPROFON)	Platinum+2× Gold	450,000^{‡}
^{‡} Sales+streaming figures based on certification alone.
