= César López (Mexican musician) =

Mexican musician

César "Vampiro" López (born March 19, 1968, in Guadalajara, Mexico) has formed part of several well-known bands of the Latin American world, including Maná, Azul Violeta and Jaguares.

He currently plays with Monoplasma, and the project "COMBO" with singer Jorge Guevara from Elefante and Mauricio Claveria from La Ley on the drums.

He was a member of Maná from 1991 to 1994. With Maná, he recorded the hit record ¿Dónde Jugarán Los Niños? ("Where will the children play?") in 1992. Many Latin Americans know his name from the song "Me Vale" which begins with the phrase "¡Échale Vampiro!" ("Play it Vampire!"). He left Mana and began to play again with his band Azul Violeta, with songs like "Solo por hoy" and "Tu luz" among others.

He started playing with Jaguares in 1998 and can be heard on the records Bajo el azul de tu misterio (1999), Cuando la sangre galopa (2001), El primer instinto (2002), Crónicas de un laberinto (2005) and 45 (2008). For 45 the group won a Grammy Award for "Latin Album Best Alternative / Rock" and two Latin Grammys: "Best Rock Album" (for 45) and "Best Rock Song" (for Entre tus Jardines). Jaguares went to a break in 2010, with the reintegration of the band Caifanes (which includes Jaguares' vocalist, drummer and keyboardist). Jaguares played a concert on June 22, 2019, in Monterrey, Mexico at the Machaca Festival.

Lopez has participated in various musical projects, recording and playing concerts as a guest. He has played at times with Belanova, and was part of their live album Canciones para la Luna in 2013. He has played with Los Concorde, Pastilla, Gerardo Enciso and Rostros Ocultos.

In 2014 he joined Cristian Castro's rock group, La Esfinge, and they released one album El Cantar de la Muerte the same year. The single was called "Beso Negro".

In 2015 he joined Víctor Monroy (singer from Pastilla) to form their project Monoplasma, recording their first album S.O.S. with the collaboration of drummer Enrique “Bugs” González (Jumbo y Los Lobos). After the departure of Monroy, Spanish singer Hector Geronimo from Moebio joined the project, with their album 1 being produced by the Grammy Award winner Alfonso Rodenas and recorded by Grammy Award winner Rafa Sardina.

He recorded the music video "Alchemy" by Raven Quinn (featuring George Lynch) in 2018.
