= Orixa (band) =

Alternative rock/rock en español band

Orixa is an alternative rock/rock en español duo from the United States. Members are Rowan Jimenez and Juan Manuel Caipo. Orixa's music mixes many different styles including rock, reggae, hip hop, Brazilian music, funk and Afro-Latin music. Orixa received a California Music Award for "Outstanding Latin Album" and the ASCAP Latino Award for "Best Independent Group".

Orixa released its self-titled debut in 1996 on Aztlan Records.

In 2000, the band released 2012.e.d on their own ELegua Digital Records. This record brought much attention to the group. In 2001 Orixa received a California Music Award for "Outstanding Latin Album" and the ASCAP Latino Award for " Best Independent Group". They were also part of the highly successful Rock En Español CD compilation "Escena Alterlatina"

The video for "Lucha Por La Freedom" was directed by Mike Buller.

In 2003, Orixa released a demo called "Siembra" (which includes an excerpt of Cheo Feliciano's "El Raton"). The song allowed them to meet Uruguayan director Leonardo Ricagni who offered to make a video for the song. The "Siembra" video debuted in 2004 on MTV-es and became the Buzzworthy video next to Juanes and the Kumbia Kings and had heavy rotation on the music channel.

Orixa released their last album to date, Siembra, in 2005 which included the singles "Siembra" as well as "The American" and "Cuando Era Un Niño". The first two were featured on Showtime's "Sleeper Cell".

The band is on hiatus as of December 2006.

Caipo has also collaborated with Hip Hop Hoodíos.
