= Miguel Mateos =

- Born: Miguel Ángel Mateos Sorrentino; January 26, 1954 (age 72); Buenos Aires, Argentina
- Genres: Rock; pop rock; new wave; synth-pop
- Occupations: Musician; songwriter; singer
- Instruments: Guitar; piano; vocals
- Years active: 1969–present
- Website: miguelmateos.com.ar

Miguel Ángel Mateos Sorrentino (born January 26, 1954) is an Argentine rock singer-songwriter from Villa Pueyrredón, Argentina. Outside Argentina he is considered one of the most important exponents of Rock en Español, especially in the 1980s when he along with Charly Garcia, Soda Stereo, Enanitos Verdes, Virus, Sumo, Fabulosos Cadillacs, Rata Blanca, and many more bands became international stars in the so-called "Argentinian Invasion" ("La Ola Argentina") of rock music that swept Latin America and parts of North America and Europe. It helped popularize Spanish-language rock outside Argentina, and make the genre a commercially successful industry.

== History ==
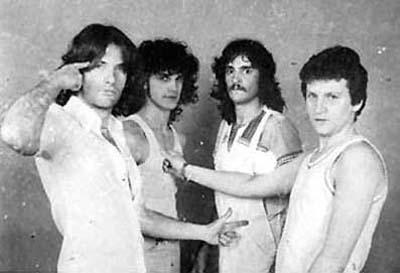
Miguel Mateos/Zas in 1982: Miguel Mateos, Fernando Lupano, Ricardo Pegnotti and Alejandro Mateos.

He became involved in music since he was 15 years of age. In 1979, he and his brother Alejandro formed the underground rock band ZAS. The following year he managed to contact Queen frontman Freddie Mercury and gain a spot on stage as the opening act for the British group for their Buenos Aires concerts. He turned ZAS into one of the most important Argentine rock bands of the early 80s.

In 1986, Mateos recorded in the United States his first solo album (officially, but in practice he still used members of ZAS as supporting band). With a much more polished sound, and greater pop accessibility than the ZAS works, Mateos jumped on the crest of the wave of Argentine rock acts that dominated the 1986–1988 period all over Latin America, Spain, and elsewhere.

Solos en América was considered a watershed album containing cuts that would become classics of Rock en Español from that time, including the homonymous track, "Cuando Seas Grande", and "Mi Sombra en la Pared".

Riding a wave of massive popularity in Mexico, Mateos introduced the slogan "Rock en tu Idioma" (Rock in your language) in 1987. He began touring that nation, introducing along the way local acts such as Caifanes and Maldita Vecindad, among others. All those groups would become major acts in their own right within a short period. In the 1987–1988 Mateos toured Latin America to sell-out stadiums. He was among the first Rock en Español acts to receive active support from fledgling MTV International.

The 1990s would be a period of continued solo success for Mateos and his now adult-pop rock music across the Spanish-speaking world, though ironically he would drop in popularity in his homeland. In general, what in the rest of Latin America is considered rock, in Argentina tended to be seen as pop. This has sometimes led to cultural confusion about how to categorize the current Miguel Mateos musical output, as outside Argentina Mateos remains an iconic figure of the Rock en Español movement.

Mateos went on the so-called first Rock en Español tour of the United States in 1990, where he was awarded the Bravo Musical Award.He released Bar Imperio in 1998 and after a hiatus released Uno in 2005.

== Discography ==
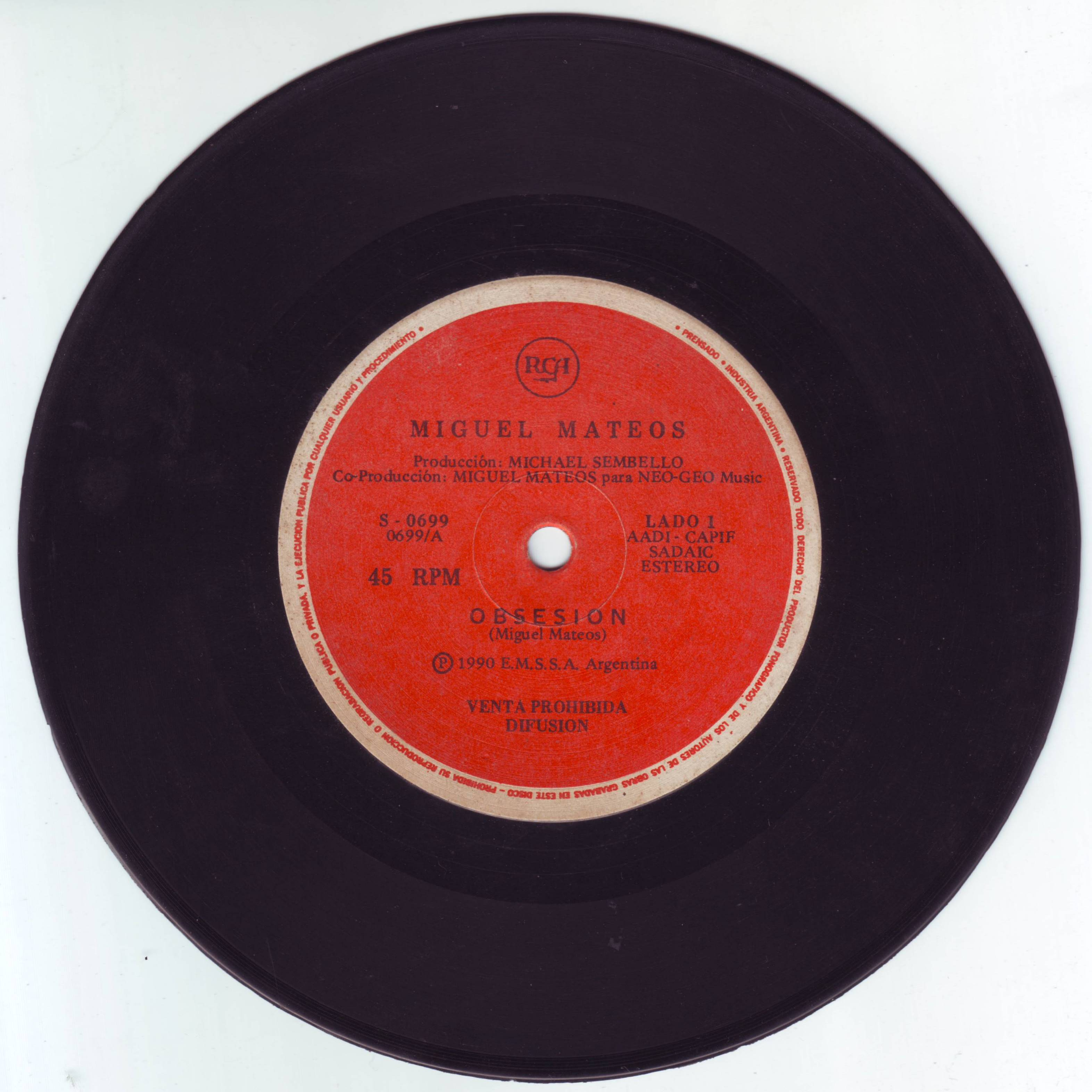
Obsesión single.

=== With ZAS ===
- ZAS (1982)
- Huevos (1983)
- Tengo que parar (1984)
- Solos en América (1986)
- Atado a un sentimiento (1987)

=== Soloist ===
- Obsesión (1990)
- Kryptonita (1991)
- Pisanlov (1995)
- Bar Imperio (1998)
- Uno (2005)
- Fidelidad (2008)
- La alegría ha vuelto a la ciudad (2013)
- Electropop (2016)
- Undotrecua (2019)

=== Live albums ===
- Cóctel (1993)
- Salir vivo (2002)
- Primera fila (2011)
