= Jaime López (songwriter) =

Mexican singer & composer (born 1954)

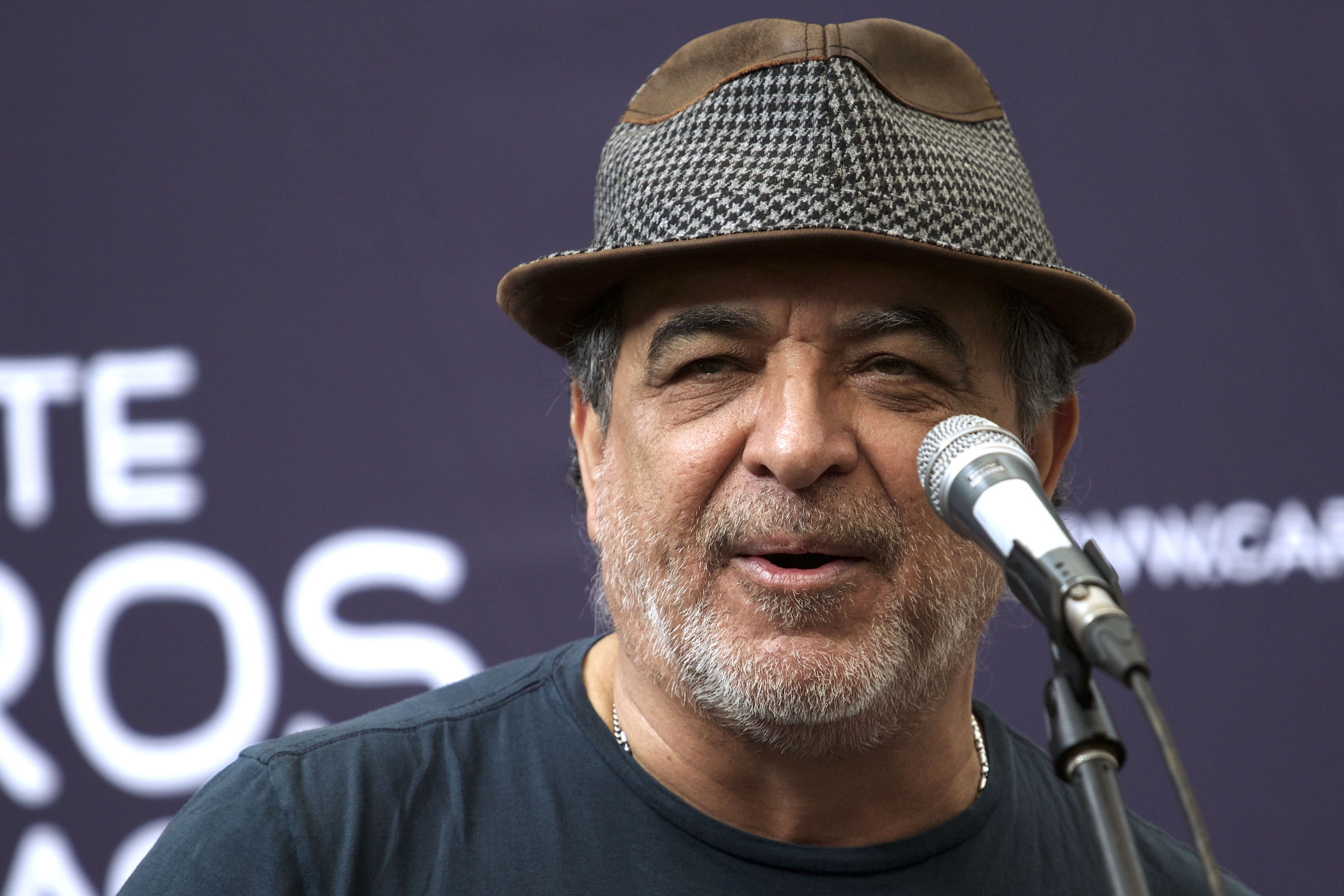
- López in 2018

Background information
- Born: Juan Jaime López Camacho; January 21, 1954 (age 72)
- Origin: Matamoros, Tamaulipas, Mexico
- Genres: Folk, Blues, rock and roll
- Occupations: Composer, musician, voice actor
- Years active: 1978–present

Juan Jaime López Camacho (born 21 January 1954, in Matamoros) is a Mexican songwriter who has been active since 70s in the musical scene.

== Bio ==
Jaime López was born, according to an autobiographical text, "in a barracks (...) I come from the old barracks of the Mexican Army", where he learned to play the guitar with "Sergeant Chanona, over there in the corrals." At the age of 16 he moved to Mexico City where he studied high school and entered the UNAM School of Philosophy and Letters, to only course a half semester leaving the school pursuing a career with the interpretation of songs that he composed.

As a composer, the proposals of his work kept outside the mainstream, in which the daily life of the society of Mexico City is described and denounced, as well as the love and heartbreak narrated of a funny way using puns with popular and street language, but without neglecting the seriousness of poetry. He is considered an important actor of Rock music in Mexico, although he has also created songs in genres as tropical, norteña, blues and bolero.

Jaime López began his career in underground artistic places of Mexico City called peñas and cafés cantantes also cultural centers and schools. In 1978 in Peña El Nahual López met Roberto González and Emilia Almazán with which he integrated the band Un viejo amor. After the separation of the band they recorded in 1980 Roberto y Jaime: sesiones con Emilia, an album that included songs that they composed for Un viejo amor and who was considered relevant by the critic and as an influential record for later musical movements such as Movimiento rupestre. He kept artistic activities in places such as Foro Tlalpan, a site where he performed alongside artists such as Guillermo Briseño, José Cruz (founder later of Real de Catorce blues band), Maru Enríquez, Jorge Luis Gaitán, Roberto González, Arturo Cipriano, Salvador El Negro Ojeda and Cecilia Toussaint, with whom he would maintain a close artistic relationship in the next years.

On August 16, 1985, he participated in the famous OTI Festival with the song "Blue demon blues" -one of the first Mexican compositions dedicated to lucha libre-, obtaining from the judges the last place in the festival for the interpretation of an humoristic song in homage to Blue Demon, whom López personally invited to the festival but was denied the entry. According to López, Blue Demon later appreciated the composition.

After OTI Festival he gained attention and have deals with mainstream record labels, signing with RCA Victor which was disapproved by his fans because they considered that Jaime López would become a commercial artist. López recorded two albums with RCA and one with BMG Ariola, Jaime López that was recorded in New York City in 1989. In that period he appeared in prime time Televisa's TV shows such as Siempre en Domingo and En Vivo.

In 1994 he published among with composer and guitarist José Manuel Aguilera, Odio Fonky: Tomas De Buró an experimental-conceptual album celebrated by critics. That album included "Chilanga banda", one of the López's best known songs, popularized in 1996 by a version made by Café Tacvba on their album Avalancha de Éxitos.

Lopez has been a Spanish voice actor for films like Finding Nemo and Home on the Range.

== Discography ==
- Roberto y Jaime, Sesiones con Emilia, LP and casete (Fotón y Ediciones Pentagrama, 1980); re edition on CD (Ediciones Pentagrama, 1990)
- El General Constante, single (45 r.p.m) (Discos Roquefón, 1980)
- Bonzo, Sencillo (45 r.p.m.) (Discos Lunátic, 1982)
- Cenzontle, Sencillo (45 r.p.m.) (Unicornio/Penélope, 1983)
- La Primera Calle de la Soledad, LP (RCA Victor, 1985); reedition on CD (Ilusiones Puerto Bagdad, 1993)
- Blue Demon Blues, single (45 r.p.m.) (RCA Victor, 1985)
- ¡¿Qué onda, ese?!, LP (IM, 1987)
- Jaime López, LP, cassette and CD (BMG Ariola, 1989)
- Oficio sin beneficio (de 1980 a 1985), (Ilusiones Puerto Bagdad, 1992)
- 15 demos del 88 al 91, cassette (Ilusiones Puerto Bagdad, 1992)
- Desenchufado, CD (Spartakus, 1998)
- Nordaka, CD (Prodisc, 1999)
- Jaime López y su Hotel Garage - Grande Sexi Tos, CD (2006)
- Arando al Aire, CD (independent, 2007)
- Por los arrabales, CD (Fonarte Latino, 2008)
- Mujer y Ego, CD (Fonarte Latino, 2011)
- Palabras necias, CD (Fonarte Latino, 2014)
- Jaime López y su Hotel Garage - Di no a la Yoga, CD (Fonarte Latino, 2014)
- Desde El Séptimo Pisto, CD (Fonarte Latino, 2025)
