= El Equilibrio de los Jaguares =

Album by Jaguares

Studio album by Jaguares
- Released: 17 September 1996
- Genre: Rock en español
- Label: RCA; BMG
- Producer: Don Was, Ed Cherney, Jaguares

Jaguares chronology
El Equilibrio de los Jaguares (1996)	Bajo el Azul de Tu Misterio (1999)

Professional ratings
Review scores
Source	Rating
AllMusic	4/5 stars

El Equilibrio de los Jaguares is the debut album by the Mexican rock band Jaguares. It was released on September 17, 1996, under the label Bertelsmann de Mexico (BMG). It was produced by Don Was, Ed Cherney, and the band.

Lead singer and songwriter Saúl Hernández and drummer Alfonso André credited as the only members of the band. Guest musicians include José Manuel Aguilera, Federico Fong, Cecilia Toussaint, Benmont Tench, Billy Preston and Flaco Jiménez.

== Track listing ==
All tracks are written by Saúl Hernández, except where indicated. All lyrics by Hernández, except in compositions by José Manuel Aguilera, where he is the author

No.	Title	Writer(s)	Length
1.	"El equilibrio (parte 1)" (“The equilibrium (part 1)”)	André, Aguilera, Fong, Hernández	2:06
2.	"Dime jaguar" (“Tell me Jaguar”)		5:00
3.	"Imagíname" (“Imagine me”)		5:02
4.	"Detrás de los cerros" (“Behind the hills”)		3:58
5.	"Huracán" (“Hurricane”)		5:40
6.	"Las ratas no tienen alas" (“Rats do not have wings”)		5:13
7.	"Nunca te doblarás" (“You will never bend”)		4:37
8.	"Clávame mejor los dientes" (“Dig your teeth in me”)	Aguilera	3:40
9.	"El equilibrio (parte 2)" (“The equilibrium (part 2)”)	André, Aguilera, Fong, Hernández	3:57
10.	"El milagro" (“The miracle”)		4:10
11.	"Déjate ver" (“Let yourself be seen”)		5:11
12.	"Solo somos sueños" (“We are only dreams”)	Aguilera	4:05
13.	"Adónde vamos a ir" (“Where are we going to go”)		4:51
14.	"Voy a volar" (“I'm going to fly”)		5:00
15.	"En la habitación de tu mente" (“In the room of your mind”)		5:16
Total length:			1:07:43

== Personnel ==
- Saul Hernández – vocals, acoustic guitar, electric guitar
- Alfonso Andre – drums
- Jose Manuel Aguilera – electric guitar
- Federico Fong – bass guitar

=== Other personnel ===
- Mark Isham – trumpet
- Flaco Jiménez – accordion
- Billy Preston – organ, keyboards
- Benmont Tench – keyboards
- Cecilia Toussaint - vocals
- Tracy Bartelle – vocals
- Gabe Witcher – violin
