= Los Amantes de Lola =

Mexican rock band

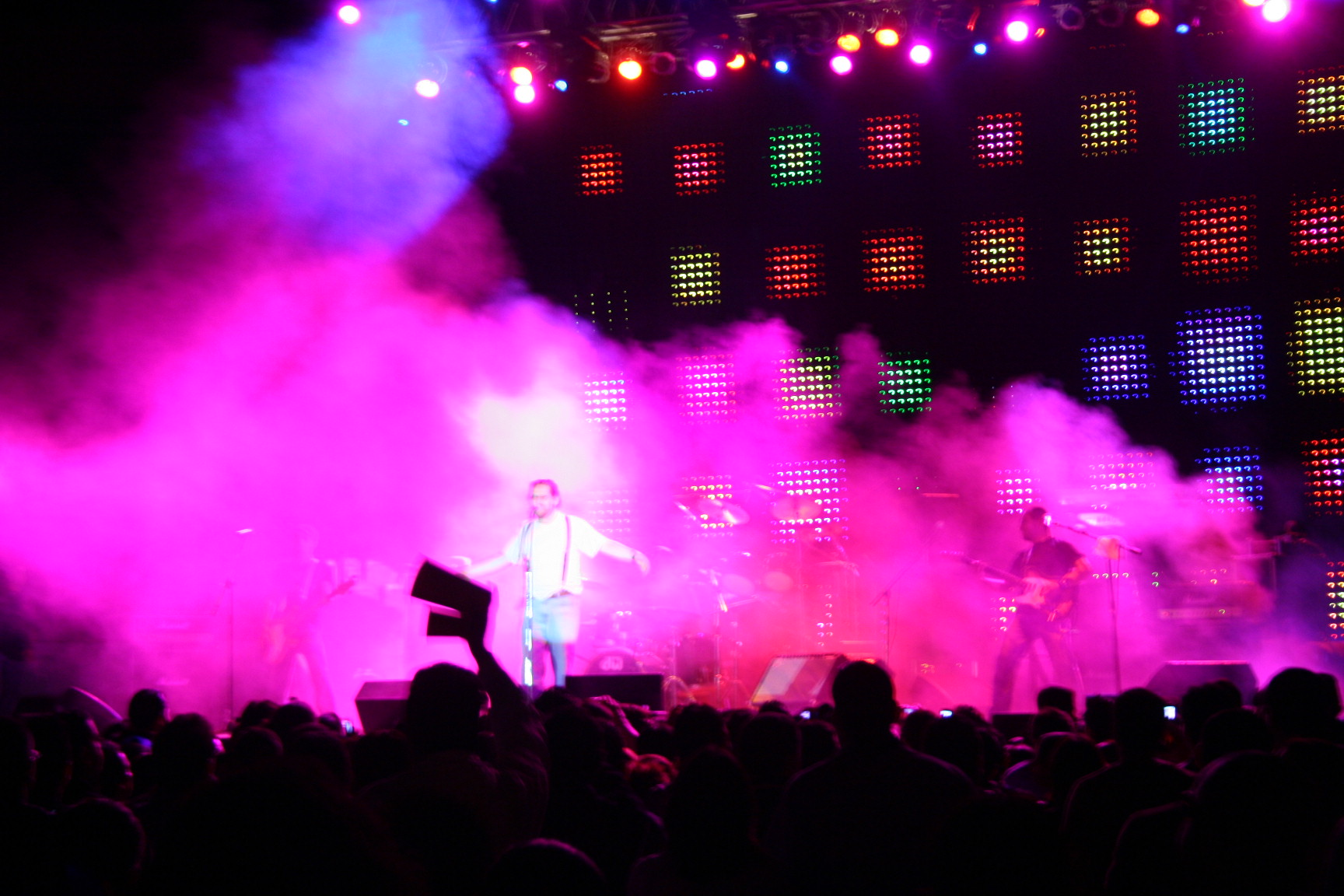
- Performing in 2007

Background information
- Origin: Mexico City, Mexico
- Genres: Rock en Español, Gothic Rock
- Years active: 1987–1993, 2000-present
- Labels: BMG, Ariola
- Members: Roberto Casas Torres; Gabriel R. Siqueiros; Alejandro Tirado; Gustavo Utrera; Dani Rosas
- Past members: Fernando Díaz Corona; Rodolfo Márquez Heine; Miguel Ángel Díaz; José Antonio Maafs; Alfredo Velásquez Martínez del Campo

Los Amantes de Lola (Lola's Lovers) are a Mexican rock band, formed in 1987 in Mexico City. The group is known for their energetic live performances and contributions to the Rock en Español and alternative rock scenes. With a career spanning over three decades, Los Amantes de Lola have influenced generations of rock musicians in Mexico and Latin America.

== History ==
Los Amantes de Lola was formed in December 1987 by a group of friends in Mexico City. The band's original lineup consisted of Roberto Casas Torres "Kazz", Fernando Díaz Corona, Gabriel R. Siqueiros "Gasú", José Antonio Maafs "Pepe" y Miguel Ángel Díaz "Miguel Ska". They initially gained attention in the local underground music scene, performing at various clubs and venues in Mexico City.

After their success in the 1988 edition of Rock en tu Idioma, Los Amantes de Lola signed a record deal with BMG and released their debut album in 1990, which featured a mix of rock, punk, and new wave influences. The band gained national recognition with their hit single "Mamá", which became an anthem for Mexican youth in the 1990s. The song's success led to a series of high-profile performances, including appearances at major music festivals in Mexico and other Latin American countries.

Throughout the 1990s, the band released several successful albums and continued to evolve their sound, incorporating elements of alternative rock, electronic music, and Latin rhythms. They collaborated with other prominent musicians and bands in the Latin American rock scene, further cementing their status as influential figures in the genre. Their song "Beber de tu sangre" remains as one of the most emblematic songs in Mexican rock music.

In the 2000s and 2010s, Los Amantes de Lola experienced lineup changes and released new material that expanded their fan base both in Mexico and internationally. They have remained active in the music scene, touring and recording new music.

In 2018 they participated in the Vive Latino Festival, and in the same year released a cover of José José's song "El triste".

== Discography ==
=== Studio albums ===
- Los Amantes de Lola (1990)
- La era del terror (1991)
- El deseo (1992)
- Rey de corazones (1994)
- El tequila y la sal (1997)
- Vuelo al paraíso (2001)
- 3 (2003)
- Historías de cabaret (2006)
- Amores perros (2008)
- Nuevos horizontes (2015)
- Alma en llamas (2021)

=== Singles ===
- "Mamá" (1990)
- "Beber de tu sangre" (1991)
- "Don Juan" (1991)
- "Para que podamos hablar" (1992)
