= La Historia (Caifanes album) =

La historia

Compilation album by Caifanes
- Released: 1 July 1997
- Genre: Rock en español
- Label: Ariola; BMG

Caifanes chronology
El nervio del volcán (1994)	La historia (1997)

Caifanes: La Historia is a compilation album by Mexican rock band Caifanes released almost two years after their sudden breakup. Singles from 1987 to 1994, including two previously unedited live recordings are included in this 24-track album. Disc 1 contains singles from 1987 to 1990; disc 2 contains singles from 1992 to 1994.

== Track listing ==
=== Disc 1 ===
1. Mátenme Porque Me Muero (Caifanes (Album)) (Ariola, 1988) - 3:31
2. Cuéntame Tu Vida (Caifanes (Album)) (Ariola, 1988) - 4:22
3. Viento (Caifanes (Album)) (Ariola, 1988) - 3:57
4. Amanece (Caifanes (Album)) (Ariola, 1988) - 3:12
5. La Negra Tomasa (Bilongo) (Caifanes (Album)) (Ariola, 1988) - 7:34
6. Perdí Mi Ojo de Venado (Caifanes (Album)) (Ariola, 1988) - 4:33
7. Detrás de Ti (El Diablito) (Ariola, 1990) - 3:36
8. La Célula Que Explota (El Diablito) (Ariola, 1990) - 3:33
9. Los Dioses Ocultos (El Diablito) (Ariola, 1990) - 4:39
10. De Noche Todos los Gatos Son Pardos (El Diablito) (Ariola, 1990) - 4:13
11. Antes de Que Nos Olviden (El Diablito) (Ariola, 1990) - 4:45

=== Disc 2 ===
1. Nubes (El Silencio) (BMG, 1992) - 4:35
2. Piedra (El Silencio) (BMG, 1992) - 4:34
3. No Dejes Que... (El Silencio) (BMG, 1992) - 4:40
4. Para Que No Digas Que No Pienso en Ti (El Silencio) (BMG, 1992) - 3:56
5. Hasta Morir (El Silencio) (BMG, 1992) - 3:45
6. Afuera (El Nervio del Volcán) (BMG, 1994) - 4:48
7. Miedo (El Nervio del Volcán) (BMG, 1994) - 3:37
8. Aquí No Es Así (El Nervio del Volcán) (BMG, 1994) - 4:54
9. Ayer Me Dijo Un Ave (El Nervio del Volcán) (BMG, 1994) - 3:29
10. Aviéntame (El Nervio del Volcán) (BMG, 1994) - 4:32
11. Quisiera Ser Alcohol (El Nervio del Volcán) (BMG, 1994) - 5:09
12. Miedo (MTV Unplugged) ** (Live, October 1994) - 3:32
13. Aviéntame (MTV Unplugged) ** (Live, October 1994) - 4:50
