= Machaca Fest =

Music and art festival in Monterrey, NL, Mexico

- Genre: Rock, Rock en español, norteño
- Dates: Mid June
- Location: Fundidora Park
- Years active: 2011-present
- Founders: Primetime Entertainment
- Attendance: 30,000 (2018)
- Organized by: Ismael Melo Montoya
- Website: www.machaca.mx

Machaca Fest is an annual music, art, and norteño traditional festival in Monterrey, Nuevo León. The event mainly showcases Latin American talent from Rock en español. Other musical genres are also featured.

== Concept ==
Machaca Fest unites a mix of national and international bands.

== History ==
Machaca Fest was officially formed in 2011, although its origins date to the 1990s in the local bar scene in Monterrey, due to the success of the Avanzada Regia with Plastilina Mosh, Control Machete, El Gran Silencio, La Flor de Lingo, Zurdok Movimiento y La Ultima del Lucas. The 2011 and 2012 festivals were hosted in the Plaza de Toros Monumental. From 2013 onwards, the festival moved to Parque Fundidora.

=== 2018 ===
The 2018 event was headlined by American rock band 30 Seconds to Mars and Colombian Reggaeton singer J Balvin. Its lineup also included Kapanga, No Te Va Gustar, Plastilina Mosh, Babasónicos and Banda de Turistas e Indios. Machaca offers food trucks with traditional Mexican food.

The official attendance according to organizers was 35,000.

=== 2019 ===
The 2019 festival is scheduled for June 22, 2019. The official band line-up includes Bad Bunny, Gwen Stefani, Jaguares, Zoé, Los Ángeles Azules, Alejandra Guzman, Bastille, Ska-P, Cartel de Santa, Cultura Profética, Mägo de Oz, Vico C, Bobby Pulido, Cuco, Gente de Zona, Jumbo, Metric, Moenia, Camilo Septimo, Carlos Sadness, Chetes, Comisario Pantera, Costera, Diamante Electrico, Estelares, FNTXY, Genitallica, Gepe, Juan Son, Kidd Keo, La Plebada, La Vela Puerca, Lola Club, Pehuenche, PJ Sin Suela, Railroad, Rey Pila, Rubytiates, Sabino, Solagua, Skapital Sound, Trillhouse and Yoga Fire.

== Next edition ==
The next edition is scheduled for 25 June 2022. The 2020 and 2021 editions were canceled due to the COVID-19 pandemic that is affecting the country.
