= La Lupita =

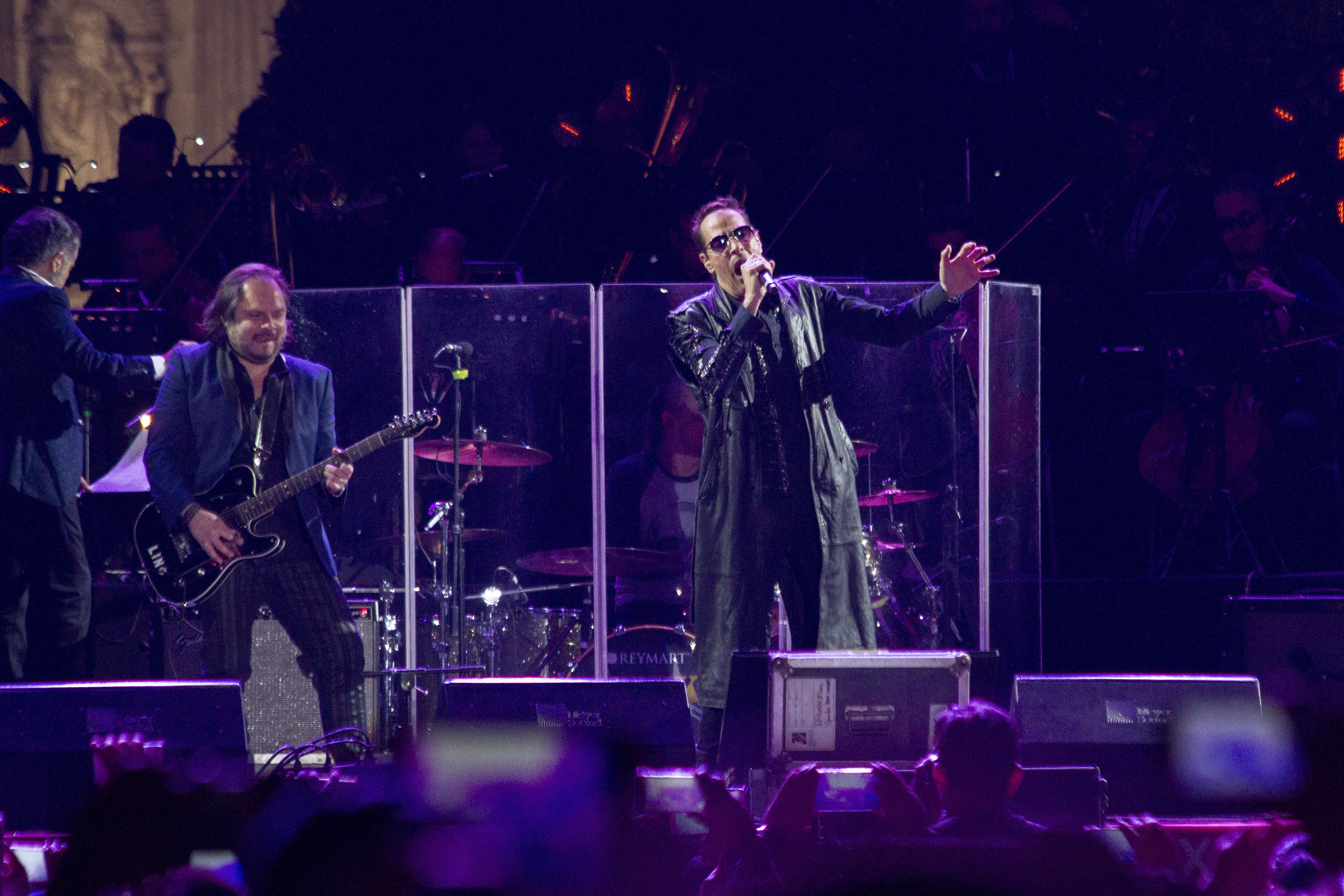

Background information
- Origin: Mexico City, Mexico
- Genres: Latin, Alternative

La Lupita is a Mexican band that combines rock and Latin music. Their lyrics are humorous and sometimes sarcastic. They released their first album, Pa' Servir a Ud, in 1992, combining heavy metal, norteñas, disco music, funk, mambo, and pop. They recorded their next album, Que Bonito es Casi Todo, two years later in London. They released their third album, known as 3D, in 1996; their fourth album, Caramelo Macizo, in 1998; and their fifth album, Lupitología, a compilation, in 2004.

== Original members ==
- Hector Quijada: Vocals
- Rosa Adame: Vocals
- Lino Nava: Guitar
- Poncho Toledo: Bass
- Ernesto "Bola" Domene: Drums
- Michel DeQuevedo: Percussion

== Current members ==
- Hector Quijada: Vocals
- Rosa Adame: Vocals
- Luis Fernando Alejo: Bass
- Paco Godoy: Drums

== Other members ==
- Miguel Rodríguez: Bass
- Mayo Mello: Bass
- Sarahí "La de Santa Maria del Nabo": Vocals
- Daniel "El Piolín": Drums
- Enrique Garcia: Percussions
- Tomás Pérez Ascencio: Drums
