= Jaguares (band) =

Mexican alternative rock band

- Origin: Mexico City, Mexico
- Genres: Alternative rock Rock en español Mexican rock Post-punk
- Years active: 1995–2010
- Labels: RCA; BMG; EMI
- Members: Saúl Hernández; Alfonso André; César "Vampiro" López; Diego Herrera; Marco Renteria
- Past members: Sabo Romo, Federico Fong, Chucho Merchán, José Manuel Aguilera, Jarris Margalli, Leonardo Muñoz Corona, Luis Conte.
- Website: Official Site Of Jaguares

Jaguares were a Mexican alternative rock band formed by former Caifanes lead singer Saúl Hernández, ex-Caifan Alfonso André (drums), and two long-time friends Federico Fong (bass guitar) and José Manuel Aguilera (lead guitar).

== History ==
Jaguares got their name from one of vocalist Saúl Hernández's dreams, in which he was singing in a jaguar's mouth.

Soon after the release of their hit debut album, El Equilibrio de los Jaguares, Hernández took a break after suffering papiloma virus cancer. As a result of a year without activity, Aguilera dropped out of the band and Fong took a break from the band, as well both continue with his band La Barranca. Aguilera was replaced by César López Garcia, most famously known as "El Vampiro", who had previously been invited to play in Caifanes' beginnings in the late 1980s. Lopez was also the previous two-time member of Azul Violeta and Maná from 1991-1994. Sabo Romo, the ex-bassist of Caifanes, was invited to join Jaguares and he accepted. Jarris Margalli also joined on rhythm guitars. After the release of their second album Bajo el Azul de Tu Misterio, Romo took a break from the band and Margalli was released from the band, leaving three as the faces of Jaguares. In 2001 Jaguares released "Cuando La Sangre Galopa" with Chucho Merchán as bassist and Leo Muñoz as a percussionist. In 2005 Federico Fong return as bassist for the new album "Crónicas de un Laberinto". In 2007, ex-Caifan Diego Herrera was featured alongside the band for the promotion of the album [45].

In 2007, Instant Karma: The Amnesty International Campaign to Save Darfur was released. It is a compilation album of various artists covering songs of John Lennon to benefit Amnesty International's campaign to alleviate the crisis in Darfur. In it Jaguares cover the protest song "Gimme Some Truth" from Lennon's 1971 album Imagine. In 2008 the group released the album titled "45", 45 represents the 45 million Mexicans living in poverty.

In 2010, the band went into what many expected to be a temporary hiatus from the spotlight due to Saúl Hernández's desire to continue his solo career and due to the official comeback of Caifanes.

On January 14, 2019, it was announced that Jaguares will reunite for a single concert as part of Machaca Fest 2019 in Monterrey, Nuevo Leon.

== Current members ==
- Saúl Hernández - Vocals/Guitars. (1996 - 2010)
- Alfonso André - Drums - (1996 - 2010)
- César "Vampiro" López - Lead Guitars (1998 - 2010)
- Diego Herrera - Keyboards/Sax (2007 - 2010)
- Marco Rentería - Bass (2006 - 2010)

== Previous members ==
- Federico Fong - Bass (1996 - 1997, 2004 - 2005)
- Sabo Romo - Bass (1998 - 2000)
- Chucho Merchán - Bass (2000 - 2003)
- José Manuel Aguilera - Lead Guitars (1996 - 1997)
- Jarris Margalli - Rhythm & Lead Guitars (1998 - 2000)
- Leonardo Muñoz Corona (1996–1998, 2001–2007; percussion)
- Luis Conte (2000; percussion)
- Stuart Hamm (bass)
- Jimmy Zavala a.k.a. Jimmy Z - harmonica, tenor saxophone (2001 - 2004)

== Discography ==
- El Equilibrio de los Jaguares (1996)
- Bajo el Azul de Tu Misterio (1999) double CD, live and studio
- Cuando la Sangre Galopa (2001)
- El Primer Instinto (2002)
- Crónicas de un Laberinto (2005)
- 45 (2008)
