= Federico Fong =

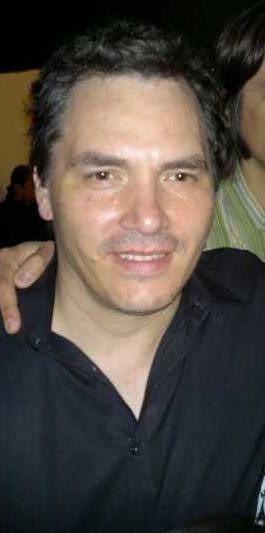

Background information
- Born: Federico Vicente Fong Pharris; 1967 (age 58–59); San Rafael, California, U.S.
- Genre: Rock
- Occupations: Musician, producer
- Instruments: Bass, Piano
- Years active: 1984–present
- Website: La Barranca official site

Federico Vicente Fong Pharris (born 1967) simply known as Federico Fong is a musician and producer, member of several bands in Mexico and the United States; these include Hip Hop Hoodíos, Jaguares, La Barranca, Caifanes, and Fobia.

== Biography ==
Born in Northern California's Bay Area in 1967 to a Panamanian father of Chinese descent and an American mother, Fong relocated at a young age with his family to Mexico City where he has lived for the majority of his life.

He was a resident of Brooklyn, New York for a few years and then relocated to Mexico City to continue working mainly with band La Barranca.
