= Caifanes =

Mexican rock band

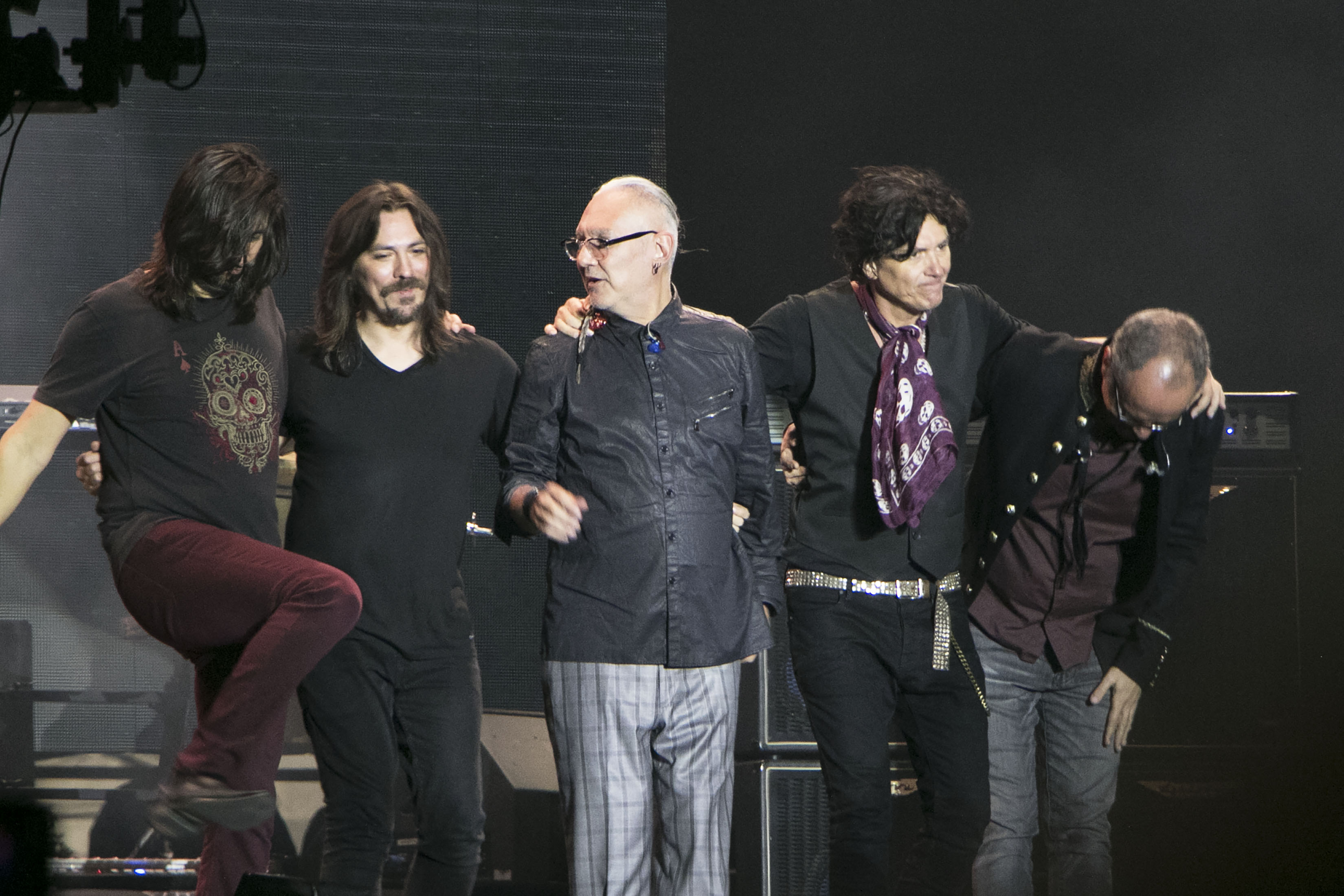
- Caifanes in 2017.

Background information
- Origin: Mexico City, Mexico
- Genres: Alternative rock, gothic rock, new wave, post-punk, progressive rock
- Years active: 1986–1996, 2011–present
- Labels: RCA; BMG Entertainment
- Members: Saúl Hernández; Alfonso André; Diego Herrera; Rodrigo Baills; Marco Rentería; Rodrigo Benítez
- Past members: Sabo Romo; Alejandro Marcovich

Caifanes is a Mexican rock band formed in Mexico City in 1986. The group achieved commercial success during the late 1980s and early 1990s. The original lineup of members consisted of Saúl Hernández (vocals and guitar), Sabo Romo (bass), Alfonso André (drums) and Diego Herrera (keyboards, saxophone). Alejandro Marcovich later joined as lead guitarist. Caifanes' style can be described as a hybrid of British new wave, progressive rock and Latin percussion underscored by deep, somber and Latin, Mexican Spanish-influenced lyrics and the vocal style of Saúl Hernández. Members of Caifanes have cited The Cure, The Beatles and King Crimson as major influences. Adrian Belew produced their third studio album, El Silencio, and made a guest appearance on the track Piedra.

The name "Caifanes" is said to be derived from the 1940s Mexican pachuco (zoot suiter) slang "cae fine". Its equivalent in English would be "cool dude". The word has also been used to describe the proverbial Mexican pachuco, delinquent or outsider.

== History ==
=== Early years ===
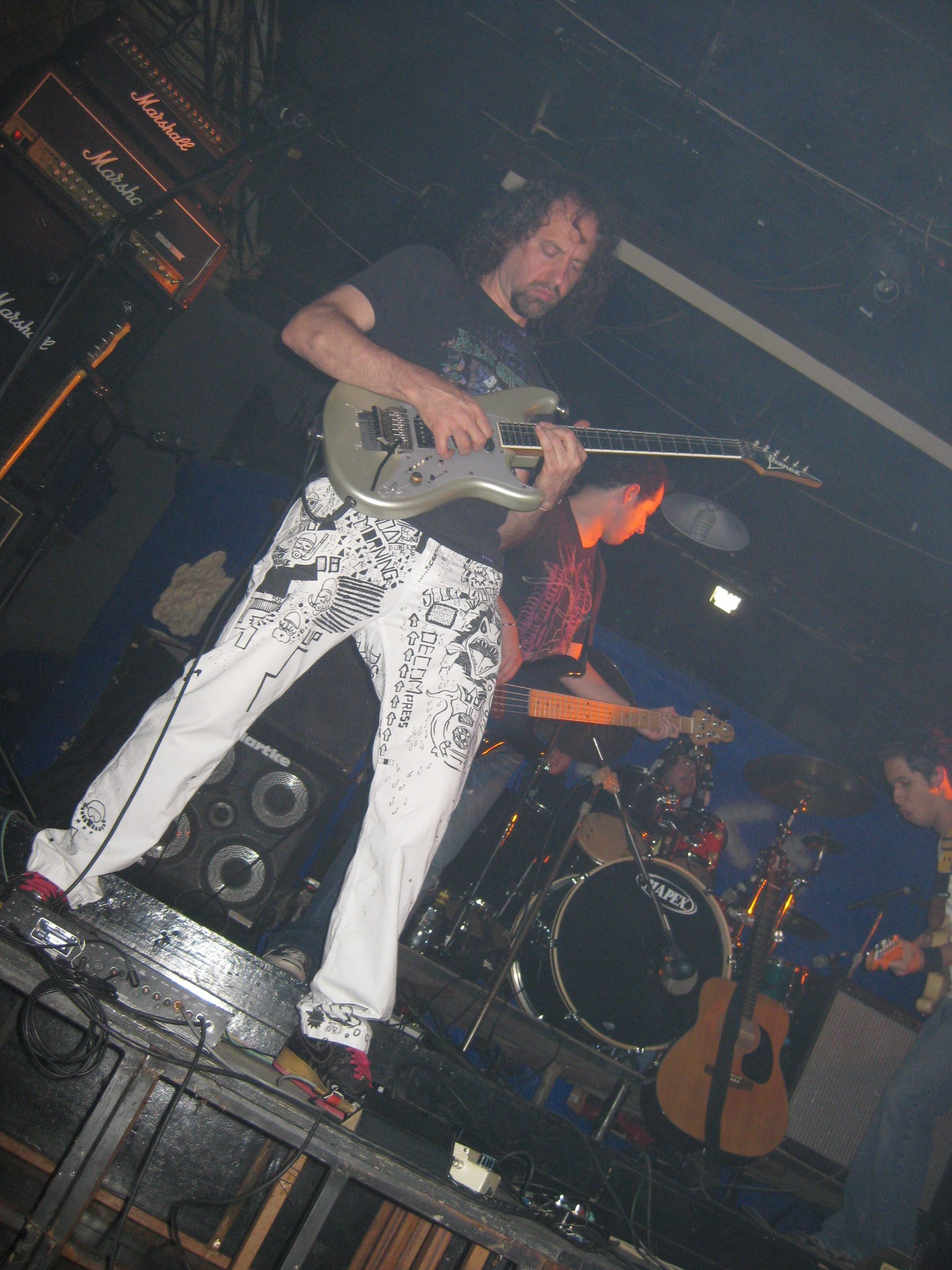
Alejandro Marcovich on Stage in San Cristobal de Las Casas Chiapas, México, in January 2009

The seeds of what later became Caifanes were planted in 1984 with Las Insolitas Imágenes de Aurora (The Unusual Images of Aurora), a band that included Saúl Hernández, Alfonso André and Alejandro Marcovich. According to Marcovich, Insólitas started as a side project for the purpose of performing as a party band for the filming of his brother's film project. (Marcovich's brother went on to direct videos for Caifanes). At the time, both Hernández and Marcovich were playing in different bands. They enjoyed the experience of playing in Insolitas and decided to continue. As the seriousness of the project grew the band began to play in different venues in Mexico City like Rockotitlán, High Tower and El Jabalí. In May 1986, Insolitas recorded a live demo at Rockotitlán. Insólitas developed a strong cult following in Mexico City.

Insólitas broke up in 1986. Saúl and Alfonso reformed as Caifanes with the bass guitar player/producer Sabo Romo and Diego Herrera on keyboards and saxophone. Caifanes' first live show was on April 11, 1987, in Rockotitlán. Their popularity began to grow throughout Mexico City. By late 1987, Caifanes had carved a niche for themselves as a dark contrast to the corporate pop/rock and light ballads that dominated Mexican radio and television during the 1980s. At times the image and the sound were considered radical for the Mexican music industry. Between December 28, 1986, and January 3, 1987, Juan Aceves produced a four-song demo for the band using "free" studio time at night at Arco Studio (where Aceves was chief engineer). The demo was showcased on the independent radio program Espacio 59 (Space 59), a show that promoted up-and-coming rock bands. With demo in hand, Caifanes approached CBS Mexico. The musical director at the time shunned them for dark new wave attire and said, "You look like fags." At the time, Caifanes' sound and look was influenced by British post-punk groups such as The Cure and The Jesus and Mary Chain. They dressed in black suits and sported frizzly hair and make-up. Upon hearing the demo of "Será Por Eso" (English: "That's Why"), the CBS executive said, "At CBS, our business is to sell records, not coffins."

Nevertheless, the movement of Rock en Español or rock en tu idioma (Rock in your language) was too strong to ignore by record executives. The flood of groups from Spain and Argentina forced Mexican labels to take a second look at up-and-coming Mexican bands. Caifanes received a big break when Ariola records invited them to open for the Argentinean rocker Miguel Mateos' Mexico City show. The show brought Cafaines to the attention of Miguel Mateos' producer and back then Mateos band bass player, Oscar Lopez aka "cachorro". He fell in love with the band and took them to the studio to record a demo. Lopez was instrumental in their signing to RCA-Ariola and went on to produce their first two albums.

Caifanes' first album, Caifanes was released in August 1988 by RCA-Ariola. It was preceded by an EP of three songs, in order to test the market. The immediate sale of 300,000 copies of the EP cemented the band's appeal. The first single, "Mátenme Porque Me Muero" ("Kill Me Because I'm Dying"), became a minor hit in Mexico City. The first three singles received radio play.

In December 1988, Caifanes released a cover of the Cuban folk singer Guillermo Rodriguez Fiffe's classic cumbia (tropical dance song), "La Negra Tomasa" (The Black Woman Tomasa) as a Maxi single. It was a massive hit in Mexico and introduced Caifanes to a wider audience nationally and abroad.

=== National success ===
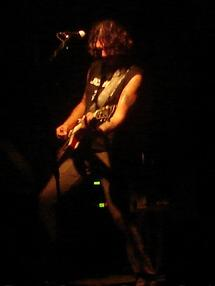
Saul Hernandez

By 1989, Caifanes had emerged as one of the hottest rock acts from central Mexico. In June, Caifanes played two sold-out shows at the National Auditorium, a 10,000 person venue—a first for a Mexican rock band.

In late 1989, Caifanes began to record a second album in New York City. Again, it was produced by Lopez, assisted by Gustavo Santaolalla and Daniel Freiberg. El diablito (The Little Devil) or Vol.2 was released in July 1990 by BMG Records. The band now included the former Insolitas Imagenes de Aurora guitarist Alejandro Marcovich. His textural guitar work considerably changed Caifanes' sound and cemented the "classic" Mexican rock sound for which Caifanes became famous. "La Célula Que Explota" (The Cell that Explodes), with its brushes of mariachi and bolero guitars and a crescendo of mariachi trumpets and its music video directed by Juan Carlos Colín became both a signature of the band as well as a massive hit in 1990 and 1991.

By this time, Caifanes along with Maná, Fobia, Maldita Vecindad, La Lupita, Café Tacuba and Los Amantes de Lola, helped to move Mexican rock toward a wider audience and catapulted the Rock En Español movement of the 1990s.

In 1992, Caifanes released El Silencio (The Silence). Recorded in Wisconsin and produced by Adrian Belew of King Crimson, El Silencio had a more direct guitar driven sound. "No Dejes Que" (Don't Let It), "Estas Dormida" (You're Sleeping), "Debajo de Tu Piel" (Under Your Skin), and the soaring "Nubes" (Clouds) went on to become Mexican rock staples. The influence of Belew, who also played guitar on the album, was felt strongest in "Hasta Morir" (Until Death), "Tortuga" (Turtle) and "Vamos a Hacer un Silencio" (Let's Make a Silence). With its string of hits and hybrid of rock and traditional Mexican music, El silencio is considered to be one of the most influential records of the Rock En Español genre. Caifanes toured extensively in support of it. By this time, the group had started to make inroads into Central and South America as well as in the United States. In August 1992, Caifanes sold out the Hollywood Palladium. In 1993, Caifanes became the first Mexican rock group to sell out Palacio de los Deportes in Mexico City.

By late 1993, Caifanes became a three piece with the exit of Romo and Herrera. Federico Fong filled in on bass guitar and Yann Zaragoza played keyboards. El nervio del volcán (The Volcano's Nerve, 1994, released by BMG, showed Caifanes with a heavier, more progressive sound. Without the distractions of Romo's lively and fluid bass guitar playing or Herrera's atmospheric keyboards, Marcovich's staccato guitar work, Alfonso's polyrythmic drumming and Hernandez's brooding and haunting vocal style became even more prominent. "Afuera" ("Outside"), the first single, fused rock grooves with an ethnic-inspired guitar solo. "Aquí No Es Así" ("It's Not Like That Here") and "Ayer Me Dijo Un Ave" ("Yesterday a Bird said to me...") became radio favorites. "Aquí No Es Así" achieved great success in Mexico and several countries of Latin America. It became the last massive hit of the band, shortly before their break up, and its music video, directed by Carlos Marcovich (Alejandro's brother, who also directed "Afuera") tells the history of the Spanish conquest of the Aztec Empire in just one shot.

In 1994, Caifanes were at the height of their popularity and was, along with Maná, one of Mexico's top stadium rock acts, selling out stadiums in Mexico and large venues throughout Latin America and the United States. They were a staple on Latin MTV, Rock en Español radio and appeared regularly at music festivals. In 1994, Caifanes opened for the Rolling Stones in Mexico City and participated in Peter Gabriel's WOMAD festival.

=== Breakup ===
1995 was the end for Caifanes. The relationship between Hernández and Marcovich was strained. On 18 August 1995, Caifanes played the final show in San Luis Potosí. A legal scuffle over the name "Caifanes" ensued, forcing Saúl Hernández to choose the name Jaguares (Spanish for "jaguars") for his new project, which was not a radical departure from the Caifanes sound. Hernández was joined by the former Caifanes and Insolitas drummer Alfonso André.

=== Reunion ===
On December 14, 2010, it was announced that the band would reunite for the Vive Latino festival and the Coachella Festival of 2011, after a reconciliation between Hernández and Marcovich.

After not having recorded since 1994, the band released a new single, "Heridos" in 2019. The band's intention was that the release of the single would be the starting point of what could be the recording of a fifth studio album. Since then, the band has released two further singles, "Sólo Eres Tú" in 2022, and "Inés" in 2023. As of June 2024, a full-length album has not been released by Caifanes since 1994's "El Nervio del Volcán".

== Legacy ==
=== Influence on popular culture ===
Caifanes collaborated in the de-sanitization of rock—its condition was one of marginalization and veiled in a conservative Mexico of the 1980s. Their arrival marked a total rupture in structures and of a number of taboos of the time, and their look collided with social norms. It was extremely unusual for a Mexican band at the time to wear make-up, dress in black, and have disheveled hair.

=== Influence on Mexican rock ===
The presence of Caifanes and the media coverage forced record companies to take existing groups seriously as well as to revitalize veteran rock figures who had long careers behind them, such as El Tri. Neon, Bon y los Enemigos del Silencio, Alquima and Maldita Vecindad. Maná and El Tri already had records out to take advantage of the surge in media support. Fobia gives enormous credit to the influence of Caifanes on their music -Hernandez collaborated in the production of the demos "Puedo Rascarme Solo", "La Iguana" and "Moscas" for a television show. Saul offered moral support to Fobia and helped them sign with BMG Ariola. A number of other bands owe their existence in the media to Caifanes, including Santa Sabina, La Castañeda, Los Amantes de Lola, Maldita Vecindad, La Cuca, La Lupita, the ska band Sekta Core!, Victimas del Doctor Cerebro, Botellita de Jerez. All of these bands have commented on the support of Caifanes for their careers.

== Band members ==
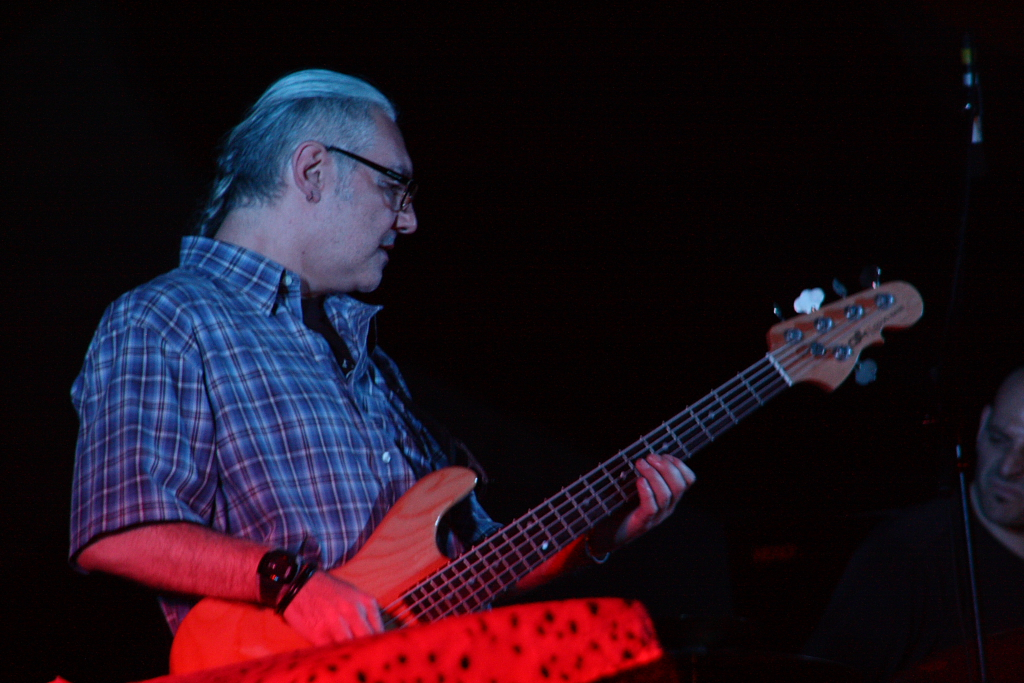
Former bassist Sabo Romo

=== Current ===
- Saúl Hernández - vocals, guitars (1986–1995, 2011–present)
- Alfonso André - drums (1987–1995, 2011–present)
- Diego Herrera - keyboards (1986–1993, 2011–present)
- Rodrigo Baills - lead guitar (2014–present)
- Marco Renteria - bass (2020–present)

=== Former ===
- Alejandro Marcovich - lead guitar (1989–1995, 2011–2014)
- Sabo Romo - bass (1986–1993, 2011–2020)
- Juan Carlos Novelo - drums (1986–1987)
- Santiago Ojeda - lead guitar, backing vocals (1987)
- Jorge "Gato" Arce - drums (1987)

=== Guest musicians and collaborators ===
Rodrigo Baills (guitars), Chucho Merchán (bass guitar), Federico Fong (bass guitar, 1993–1995), José Manuel Aguilera (guitar, 1994–1995), Stuart Hamm (bass guitar, 1993), Gustavo Cerati (guitar, 1988), Adrian Belew (guitar, 1992), Yann Zaragoza (keyboards, 1993–1995), Leo (percussion), Graham Nash (harmonica/bass, 1993), Lenny Castro (percussion drums, 1994–1995), Jimmy Z. Zavala (harmonica/saxophone, 1994)

== Select discography ==
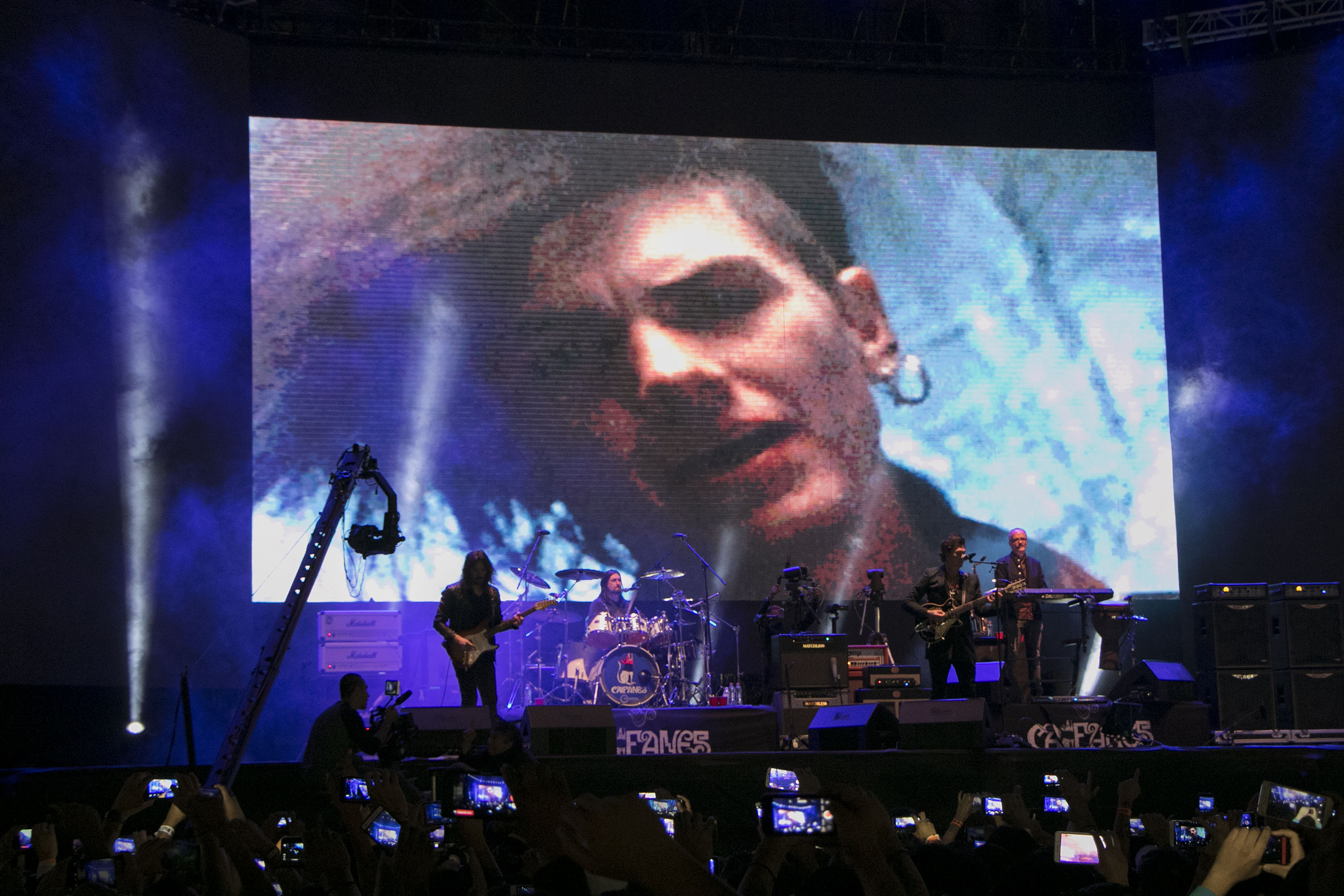
At the Zócalo of Mexico City

=== Studio albums ===
- 1988: Caifanes (Matenme porque me muero, Volumen 1)
- 1990: El Diablito (Volumen 2)
- 1992: El Silencio
- 1994: El Nervio Del Volcán

=== Compilations ===
- 1997: La Historia (History)
- 1999: Rock Milenium: Caifanes
- 2009: Essential Caifanes
- 2011: Recupera tus clásicos - Caifanes

=== Live album ===
- 1995: Caifanes MTV Unplugged

== See also ==
- Jaguares
- Rock en español
- Latino punk
- Rock en tu idioma
