= Sabo Romo =

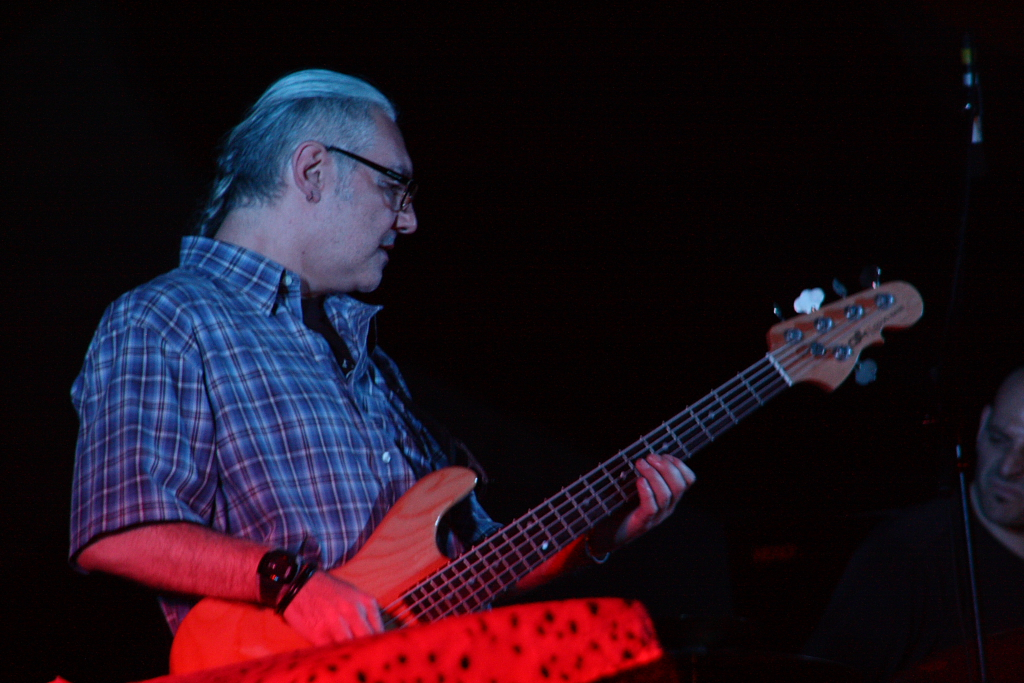

Background information
- Also known as: Sabo
- Born: Salvador Romo López Guerrero; March 12, 1963 (age 62); Mexico City, Mexico
- Genres: Rock; Rock en español; Mexican rock; Pop rock; Jazz
- Occupations: Musician, bassist, songwriter, singer
- Instruments: Bass, Vocals, Guitar, Keyboard, Drums
- Years active: 1981–present
- Member of: Caifanes
- Formerly of: Manhattan; Jaguares (band); Rock en tu Idioma Sinfónico

Salvador Sabo Romo is a bass and guitar player, composer and producer. He was born in Mexico City.

Interested in music since childhood, he played drums, wrote songs and sang on his first band. At eighteen he discovered the bass, and formed "Manhattan", a light jazz band, and then "Ruido Blanco" with journalist and musician Óscar Sárquiz, who introduced Sabo to Guillermo Briseño, (musician, poet) and Ricardo Ochoa (musician and producer) starting the recording and production of many records with many tours in the mid-1980s.

Romo was a founding member of Caifanes in 1987, recording three albums with BMG and touring all over the world with them; he left the band in 1993 and performed his last live concert at Palacio de los Deportes in Mexico City. He also produced artists such as Aleks Syntek, Benny, Ely Guerra, Gandhi (Costa Rica), Moenia, Tania Libertad, and the Jaguares ... and has sold 10 million copies. Sabo has been declared "The best latinamerican Bass Player".

Romo edited with BMG and his own record label "Mulata Records" his first solo album in 1996: SSS. He played on tour with Adrian Belew, Stewart Copeland, Andy Summers, Miguel Mateos, Charly Garcia, Soda Stereo actually working on his new projects: Los Finger, Los Padrisimos, Veltons and his second solo double album.

On February 19, 2010, Romo suffered a heart attack and has recovered successfully.
