= Saúl Hernández =

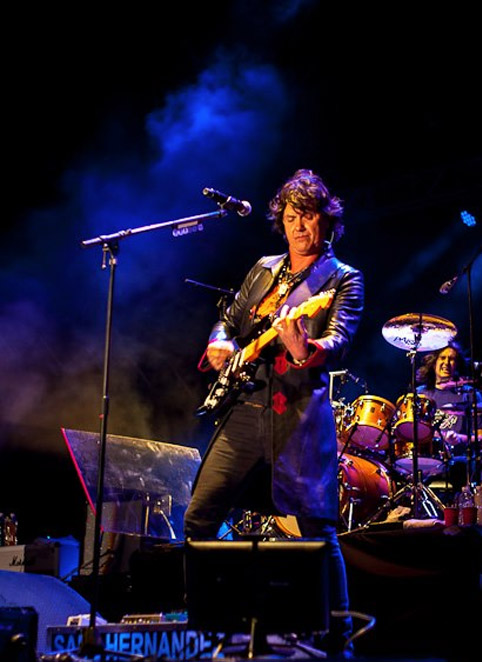

Background information
- Born: January 15, 1964 (age 62)
- Origin: Mexico City, Mexico
- Genre: Rock en Español
- Years active: 1979–present
- Label: EMI
- Website: www.jaguaresmx.com

Saúl Alfonso Hernández Estrada (born January 15, 1964), is a Mexican musician, writer, poet, songwriter and the lead singer of Jaguares and Caifanes, two prominent Mexican rock en español bands.

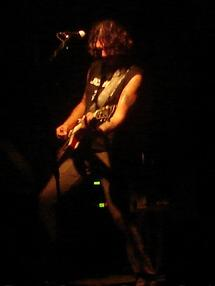
Hernández playing live

== Biography ==
Saúl Hernández was born in the Colonia Guerrero neighborhood of Mexico City on January 15, 1964. He lost his mother at a young age and he explained that this early confrontation with death became an inspiration for many of the songs he has written. His first band was Las Insólitas Imágenes de Aurora, the predecessor to Caifanes.

=== Caifanes ===
After the breakup of Las Insólitas Imágenes de Aurora, the group's demo was widely circulating in the Mexico City music scene. When Caifanes was formed, the lineup consisted of Alfonso André on drums, Sabo Romo on bass and Diego Herrera on keyboard. Alejandro Marcovich would eventually join the band on lead guitar. The band made its first appearance on April 11, 1987 in a forum that would catapult new bands, Rockotitlán. The event was a huge success and it marked the beginning of Caifanes.

=== Jaguares ===
After the Caifanes breakup, Saul Hernández formed a new band in late 1995, called Jaguares, along with former Caifanes drummer Alfonso André and two long time friends, Federico Fong on bass and José Manuel Aguilera on lead guitar. José Manuel Aguilera was involved in Jaguares' first studio album; Cesar "Vampiro" Lopez later took over on lead guitar and has been in the band since.

In 1996, Saúl Hernández sang a duet with Algerian raï singer Khaled. The song, called Ki Kounti, is sung partially in Arabic and Spanish.

Since its formation, Jaguares has been one of "rock en español" (Rock in Spanish) premier bands with both critical and commercial success.

=== Caifanes returns ===
Towards the end of 2010, Saúl Hernández reconciled with former Caifanes guitarist Alejandro Marcovich and announced their return for the Vive Latino 2011 festival, which marked the reunion of the original band members.

=== Jaguares returns ===
On January 14, 2019, it was announced that Jaguares will reunite for a single concert as part of Machaca Fest 2019 in Monterrey, Nuevo Leon.

== Recognition ==
Enrique Lopetegui of the Los Angeles Times wrote in 1996: "Hernandez has never been a great singer, but he became Mexico’s biggest rock hero thanks to a unique timbre, a moving delivery, poetry of devastating darkness and a rare talent for writing hymn-like songs".
