= Vive Latino =

Annual music festival in Mexico City, Mexico

- Genre: Latin rock, Latin alternative, Indie rock, Rock en español, Ska
- Date: Mid March
- Frequency: Annually
- Locations: Mexico City, Mexico
- Years active: 1998; 2000–2001; 2003–2021; 2022–present
- Inaugurated: 1998
- Founder: OCESA
- Most recent: 15 March 2025 – 16 March 2025
- Website: www.vivelatino.com.mx

Vive Latino - Festival Iberoamericano de Cultura Musical, known for sponsorship reasons as Amazon Vive Latino, is an annual music festival held in Mexico City. It is one of the most important music festivals in Mexico, featuring a great variety of groups of many genres.

The event takes place at Estadio GNP Seguros at the Autodromo Hermanos Rodriguez usually in the months of March and April. The duration of the festival has been one to three days, depending on the number of live acts, but since 2010 the festival's length has been 2 or 3 days. The first edition was in 1998, and has been repeated yearly ever since (except for 1999 and 2002). The number of stages has changed over the time, ranging from 2 to 4.

The festival's concept is to every year gather important and newcoming bands from all over Ibero-America for three days to create a space for alternative music and new proposals from different Spanish-speaking bands. In the history of the festival there's been a series of important musical performances by many artists from Latin America and Spain, such as Café Tacuba, Enrique Bunbury, Charly García, Aterciopelados, Los Tres, Caifanes, Bersuit Vergarabat, El Cuarteto de Nos, Illya Kuryaki and the Valderramas, Los Planetas, Gustavo Cerati, Los Amigos Invisibles, Babasónicos, Miguel Ríos, Celso Piña, Los Jaigüey, El Tri, Ratones Paranoicos, Nortec Collective, Sepultura, Divididos, Transmetal, Ángeles del Infierno, 2 Minutos, Control Machete, Los Bunkers, etc.

Besides Ibero-American musical acts, the festival has been opened for proposals from all over the world, with special appearances by Latin bands located in the U.S. such as Los Lobos, Tito & Tarantula, Devendra Banhart, Ill Niño, Brujeria, The Mars Volta, Los Straitjackets, Rodrigo y Gabriela, Ozomatli, and Los Abandoned. The festival bill has also had non-Spanish speaking acts like The Magic Numbers, Black Rebel Motorcycle Club, The Chemical Brothers, Urlaub in Polen, Blasted Mechanism, Calexico, Jane's Addiction, The National, DeVotchKa, Deftones, Marky Ramone, and Red Hot Chili Peppers among others.

Every year the festival's line up has a strong presence in the ska and reggae acts, having big figures of the genre such as The Wailers, The Skatalites, Desmond Dekker, Fishbone, Tokyo Ska Paradise Orchestra, Steel Pulse, Reel Big Fish, and Save Ferris, besides the performances from important Ibero-American bands like Panteón Rococó, Los Fabulosos Cadillacs, Ska-P, Los Auténticos Decadentes, Desorden Público, and Maldita Vecindad.

As the festival itself is not limited to rock acts, it has often acts of entirely unrelated music genres. This, however, proved to be disastrous in the 2007 edition, which included a Reggaetón act by Calle 13, that angered a big section of the public, which booed and even threw bottles and objects at the stage forcing the band to leave.

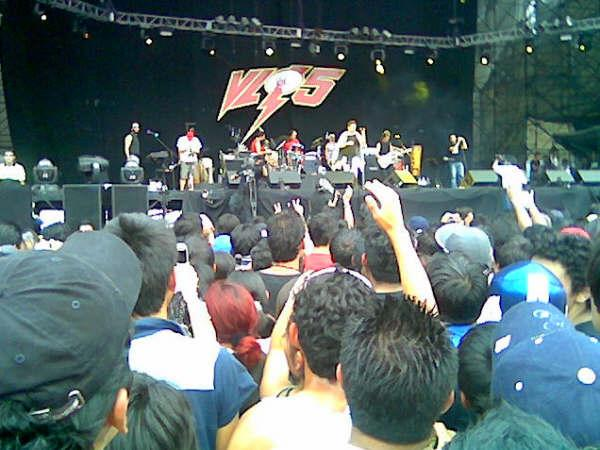
Vicentico performing on Vive Latino 2005

== November 1998 ==
Aterciopelados, Café Tacuba, Molotov, Maldita Vecindad, Illya Kuryaki, Control Machete, Todos Tus Muertos, Ángeles del Infierno, Tijuana No, El Gran Silencio, La Cuca, Las Víctimas del Doctor Cerebro, Resorte, Sekta Core, Los Esquizitos, Titán, Los de Abajo, Guillotina, Salón Victoria, Riesgo de contagio, Flor De Lingo, Quehaceres de Mamá, Ozomatli, El Tri, Miguel Ríos, Juan Perro, Danza Invisible, La Lupita, Cecilia Toussaint, Aterciopelados, Los Tres, Santa Sabina, La Barranca, Julieta Venegas, La Castañeda, Ritmo Peligroso, Kenny y los Eléctricos, La Gusana Ciega, Julio revueltas, Ely Guerra, La Dosis, Poncho Kingz, La Ley.

== November 2000 ==
Saturday, 11 November - Sunday, 12 November

Habana, Tito & Tarantula, Ely Guerra, Zurdok, Panteón Rococó, Los Auténticos Decadentes, Mariachi Terror, La Castañeda, Ganadores De La Resistencia, Los Amigos Invisibles, Dover, Fishbone, The Wailers, Ska-P, Molotov, Los Fabulosos Cadillacs, Los Tetas, Sekta Core, Desorden Público, Divididos, Resorte, La Gusana Ciega, Julieta Venegas, Jumbo, Los Pericos, El Gran Silencio, Enrique Bunbury, Jaguares

== November 2001 ==
Saturday, 24 November

Bersuit Vergarabat, Desorden Público, El Gran Silencio, Genitallica, Havana, José Fors, Joselo, La Lupita, La Verbena Popular, Liquits, Los de Abajo, Los Estrambóticos, Lucybell, Maldita Vecindad, Moderatto, Panteón Rococó, Pericos, Puya, Resorte, Revólver, Save Ferris, Zurdok

== May 2003 ==
Sunday, 11 May

Aterciopelados, Babasónicos, Café Tacuba, Cartel de Santa, El Gran Silencio, Enanitos Verdes, Los Estrambóticos, Genitallica, Guillotina, Jumbo, Kinky, Los de Abajo, Los Tetas, Molotov, Natalia Lafourcade, Panteón Rococó, Pito Perez, Resorte, Televisión Kamikaze, Las Ultrasónicas, Vicentico

== May 2004 ==
Sunday, 9 May

Ángeles del Infierno, Antidoping, Azul Violeta, Babasónicos, Bersuit, Cartel de Santa, Catupecu Machu, Crista Galli, Chancho en Piedra, Circo, Control Machete, Cuca, Dildo, Ely Guerra, Fobia, Haragán y Cia, Ill Niño, Julieta Venegas, Kinky, La Barranca, Liquits, Los Amantes de Lola, Los Auténticos Decadentes, Lost Acapulco, Lucybell, Maldita Vecindad, Moderatto, Rata Blanca, Santa Sabina, Televisión Kamikaze, The Mars Volta, Vaquero, Volumen Cero, Zoé

== April 2005 ==
Sunday, 16 April

Austin TV, Babasónicos, Big Metra, Botellita de Jeréz, Cartel de Santa, Catupecu Machu, De saloon, Desmond Decker, División Minúscula, Ely Guerra, Estrambóticos, Grandmama, Jarabe de Palo, La Casta, La Lupita, Liquits, Lira n' Roll, Los Abandoned, Los de abajo, Los Látigos, Los Shajatos, LVzbel, macaco, Mario, Moderatto, Molotov, Panteón Rococó, Pericos, Porter, Quiero Club, San Pascualito Rey, Skatalites, Sussie 4, Telefunka, Thermo, Tólidos, Vicentico, Zoé, Zuker XP.

== May 2006 ==
Saturday, 13 May - Sunday, 14 May

Allison, Amaral, Austin TV, Bengala, Brujeria, Charly Montana, Disidente, División Minúscula, El Gran Silencio, Elis Paprika, Fobia, Kinky, Líbido, Los Abandoned, Los de abajo, Los Dynamite, Los planetas, Lost Acapulco, Lucybell, Nortec Collective, Panteón Rococó, Pato Machete, Plastiko, Rastrillos, Resorte, San Pascualito Rey, Thermo, Vaquero, Yucatán A Go Go, Zurdok, Agora, Bersuit, Big Metra, Celtas cortos, Chetes, Desorden Público, Dildo, Instituto Mexicano del Sonido, Joselo, Jumbo, Julieta Venegas, La Gusana Ciega, Los Auténticos Decadentes, Los Búnkers, Los Esquizitos, Los Super Elegantes (Milena Muzquiz and Martiniano Lopez), Los Tres, Maria Daniela y su Sonido Lasser, Niña, Ozomatli, Palomazo informativo, Panda, Plastilina Mosh, Porter, San Pascualito Rey, Satin Dolls, Tex Tex, Titán, Tolidos, Turf, Víctimas del Dr. Cerebro, Zoé.

== May 2007 ==
Saturday, 5 May - Sunday, 6 May

Austin TV, Becker, Bengala, Café Tacvba, COhETICA, Calle 13, Canseco, Gustavo Cerati, Chetes, Chikita Violenta, Nortec Collective, Mariachi Terror, Columpio Asesino, Cuarteto de nos, Cuca, Desorden Público, Devendra Banhart, División Minúscula, El Tri, Ely Guerra, Fenómeno fuzz, Finde, Flavio Cianciarulo, Fobia, Furland, Gondwana, Hana, Instituto Mexicano del Sonido, Jessy Bulbo, Jumbo, Kill Aniston, Kinky, La gusana ciega, La Tremenda Korte, Liquits, Los Amigos Invisibles, Los Bunkers, Los Dynamite, Los Gatos, Los Licuadora, Los Músicos de José, Los Piojos, No somos machos pero somos muchos, Ozomatli, Pastilla, Porter, Quiero Club, Rata Blanca, Réplica, San Pascualito Rey, Sargent García, Satin Dolls, Six Million Dollar Weirdo, Sonidero Nacional, Sr. Bikini, Steel Pulse, Tanke, The Cosmetics, The Locos, The Magic Numbers, Transmetal, Veo Muertos, Volován, Zoé

== May 2008 ==
Saturday, 14 May - Sunday, 15 May

Black Rebel Motorcycle Club, Reel Big Fish, Jarabe de Palo, Los Lobos, Babasónicos, Bersuit Vergarabat, The Wailers, Plastilina Mosh, Panteón Rococó, Los Tres, Los Cafres, El Gran Silencio, Panda (band), Todos Tus Muertos, Los Piojos, Nortec Collective, Los Auténticos Decadentes, La Habitación Roja, Los Straitjackets, El Otro Yo, Maldita Vecindad, Sussie 4, Liquits, Los Dynamite, Kapanga, Lost Acapulco, Javiera Mena, Botellita de Jerez, Santa Sabina, Quiero Club, Thermo, Insite, Niña, Los Fancy Free, Árbol, Dildo, Caramelos de Cianuro, Descartes a Kant, Tolidos, Disidente, Urlaub in Polen, Ceci Bastida, Los Daniels, Ángeles del Infierno, Le Baron, Ventilader, dante, Tren Loco, Satin Dolls, El Haragan, Los Mentas, Los Ratones Paranoicos, Los Caligaris, Sonidero Nacional, yokozuna, Kill Aniston, Gerardo Enciso, pato machete, Pánico Ramírez, DLD, Troker, Lawson, The Volture, Payro, Electric Co., Jackie'O, $6M Weirdo, Ágora and Sr. Flavio

== June 2009 ==
Saturday, 27 June - Sunday, 28 June

Los Fabulosos Cadillacs, Andrés Calamaro, Molotov, Kinky, Jaguares, Zoé, Los Bunkers, La Vela Puerca, Gondwana, La Gusana Ciega, Little Joy, La Fuga, Ximena Sariñana, Nortec Collective, La Lupita, Petra, Instituto Mexicano del Sonido, Austin TV, Fidel Nadal, Blasted Mechanism, Gepe, San Pascualito Rey, Hello Seahorse!, Vetusta Morla, Inspector, La Castañeda, Victimas Del Doctor Cerebro, Dios, Anita Tijoux, Monocordio, Casino, División Minúscula, Bengala, Hummersqueal, Silverio, Los Concorde, finde, La Pulqueria, Mariachi Terror, Rescate, Los Gatos, Jaramar, Guillotina, Volován, Los Daniels, Banda De Turistas, Cabezas de Cera, Adanowsky, Sekta Core, Bill, Marky Ramone, Los Esquizitos, Satin Dolls, Hana, Salón Victoria, Enjambre, Yokozuna, Fratta, Los Dorados, Paté de Fuá, Fenómeno Fuzz, Simplifires, Cienfue, Sr Mandril, Niña Dioz, Alonso Arreola, Ritmo Peligroso, Neon Walrus, Lemons, El Clan, Banda bostik, Alejandro Otaola, Maligno, Los Marty, Los Weeds, Play&Movil Project, discoRUIDO!, Atto & The Majestics, Oh My Oh, Consumatum Est, Dirty Karma, Clondementto, Santiago Behm, Pila Seca, Zordem, Mongol Gol Gol, The Satura, Desarmado and zanate y asociados.

== April 2010 ==
Friday, 23 April - Sunday, 25 April

Abominables, Ágora, Aguamala, Andrés Cantisani, Astro, Aterciopelados, Austin TV, Banda de Turistas, Bocafloja, Calexico, Calle 13, Carca, Cecilia Toussaint, Celso Piña, Cienfue, Corcobado, Cráneo de Jade, Crista Galli, Cuca, Chetes, DaPuntoBeat, Deftones, Descartes a Kant, DLD, Dr Frankenstein (ópera rock), Dr Krapula, El Cuarteto de Nos, Ely Guerra, Empire of the Sun, Estados Alterados, Francisca Valenzuela, Furland, Hello Seahorse! (surprise guest band), Juan Pablo Villa Julieta Venegas, Kafka Jones, Kapanga, Kenny (from Kenny and the Electrics), Kimah, Klemerzon, Kumbia Queers, La Chilanga Habanera, Le Butcherettes, LeBaron, Liber Teran, Liran'roll, Los Amigos Invisibles, Los Auténticos Decadentes, Los Mentas, Los Músicos de José, Los Negretes, Los Odio, Los Románticos de Zacatecas, Los Tres, Lost Acapulco, Malacates Trébol Shop, Mägo de Oz, Manuel García, Misterio, Monte Negro, Muna Zul, Mystica Girls, Nacho Vegas, Nos Llamamos, Ozomatli, Panteón Rococó, Paté de Fuá, Pedro Piedra, Polka Madre, Pato Machete, Qué Payasos, Quiero Club, Rise Against, Rodrigo y Gabriela, Rostros Ocultos, Salón Victoria, San Pascualito Rey (surprise guest band), Silverio, Ska-P, Sonex, Sussie 4, Thermo, Tijuana No!, Todos Tus Muertos, Troker, Ventilader, Veo Muertos, Vicente Gayo, Víctimas del Doctor Cerebro, Victoria Mil.

== April 2011 ==
Friday, 8 April - Sunday, 10 April

- (Argentina) - 2 Minutos
- (France) (Mexico) - Adanowsky
- (Mexico) - Agrupacion Cariño
- (Spain) - Albert Pla
- (Uruguay) (Argentina) - Alika & Nueva Alianza
- (Mexico) - Alonso Arreola
- (Mexico) - Alyosha Barreiro
- (Mexico) - Andrea Balency Trio
- (Chile) - Ana Tijoux
- (Mexico) - Ansia
- (Mexico) - Atto and The Majestics
- (Mexico) - Azul Violeta
- (Argentina) - Babasónicos
- (Mexico) - Bam-Bam
- (Argentina) - Banda de Turistas
- (Mexico) - Bengala
- (Mexico) - Bogo
- (Colombia) - Bomba Estereo
- (Mexico) - Caifanes
- (Mexico) - Candy
- (Argentina) - Carla Borghetti
- (Mexico) - Carla Morrison
- (Spain) - Carlos Ann
- (Mexico) - Cero Absoluto
- (Argentina) - Charly García
- (Mexico) - Chikita Violenta
- (Mexico) - Disco Ruido
- (Japan) - Djamra
- (Spain) - Dorian
- (Colombia) - Doctor Krápula
- (Puerto Rico) - Draco Rosa
- (Spain) - El Guincho
- (Mexico) - Electric Co.
- (Mexico) - Elis Paprika
- (United States) (Ecuador) - Eljuri
- (Argentina) - Enanitos Verdes
- (Mexico) - Enjambre
- (Venezuela) - Famas Loop
- (Argentina) - Fidel Nadal
- (Mexico) - Finde
- (Mexico) - Fobia
- (Mexico) (Uruguay) - Frontline Guerrilla Sonora
- (Mexico) - Gula
- (Argentina) - Hana
- (Mexico) - Here Comes the Kraken
- (Mexico) - Hong Kong Blood Opera
- (Mexico) - Hummersqueal
- (United States) - Jane's Addiction
- (Spain) - Jarabe de Palo
- (Mexico) - Jessy Bulbo
- (Mexico) - Joe Volume
- (United States) - Kipchoge and the Ginger Ninjas
- (Mexico) - La Barranca
- (Mexico) - La Dosis
- (Mexico) - La Gusana Ciega
- (Mexico) - La Hora de la Hora
- (Mexico) - La Internacional Sonora Balkanera
- (Spain) - La Pulquería
- (Argentina) - Las Pastillas del Abuelo
- (Mexico) - Les Estuches
- (United Kingdom) - Letz Zep
- (Mexico) - Liber Teran
- (Mexico) - Liquits
- (Chile) - Los Bunkers
- (Spain) - Los Coronas
- (Mexico) - Los Daniels
- (Mexico) - Los de Abajo
- (Mexico) - Los Dorados
- (Mexico) - Los Elásticos
- (Mexico) - Los Estrambóticos
- (Mexico) - Los Licuadoras
- (Argentina) - Los Pericos
- (Spain) - Macaco
- (Mexico) - Madame Recaimer
- (Spain) - Mala Rodríguez
- (Mexico) - Manchuria
- (Mexico) - Mara (with Charlie Monttana)
- (Mexico) - Marlento
- (Mexico) - Nana Pancha
- (Mexico) - Natalia Lafourcade
- (Uruguay) - No Te Va Gustar
- (Mexico) - Nortec Collective Presents: Bostich + Fussible
- (Mexico) - Payro
- (Canada) - People's Project
- (Mexico) - Pito Pérez
- (Mexico) - Proyecto Geko
- (Mexico) - Puerquerama
- (Mexico) - Radaid
- (Mexico) (United States) - Rana Santacruz
- (Mexico) - Raxas
- (Mexico) - Rebel Cats
- (Mexico) - Rey Pila
- (Mexico) - Ruido Rosa
- (Mexico) - Rulo y La Contrabanda
- (Mexico) - San Pascualito Rey
- (Mexico) - Sara Valenzuela
- (Brazil) - Sepultura
- (Mexico) - Seven Rays
- (Mexico) - She's a Tease
- (Argentina) - Sho Trio
- (Mexico) - Sonidero Mestizo
- (Mexico) - Tanke
- (Mexico) - Telefunka
- (Mexico) - Telesis
- (United Kingdom) - The Chemical Brothers
- (United States) - The National
- (Spain) - The Pinker Tones
- (Mexico) - The Plastics Revolution
- (Japan) - Tokyo Ska Paradise Orchestra
- (Mexico) - Torreblanca
- (Mexico) - Turbina
- (Colombia) - Velandía y la Tigra
- (Mexico) - Vicente Gayo
- (Mexico) - Yokozuna

=== Additionals group musics and artists ===
- (Mexico) - Stratens
- (Mexico) - Ultrasónico
- (Mexico) - Vate

== March 2012 ==
Friday, 23 March - Sunday, 25 March

- (El Salvador) - Adhesivo
- (Mexico) - Alfonso Andre
- (Mexico) - Amandititita
- (Mexico) - Antidoping
- (Mexico) - Antoine Reverb
- (Chile) - Astro
- (Mexico) - Atto & The Majestics
- (Mexico) - Austin TV
- (United States) - Black Tide
- (Mexico) - Boxer
- (United States) - Brainkiller
- (Mexico) - Café Tacuba
- (Venezuela) - Caramelos de Cianuro
- (Mexico) - Capo
- (Mexico) - Caravana
- (Mexico) - Carla Morrison
- (Argentina) - Catupecu Machu
- (Mexico) - Comisario Pantera
- (Spain) - Def Con Dos
- (Chile) - Dënver
- (Mexico) - Descartes a Kant
- (Mexico) - Disidente
- (Mexico) - DLD
- (Mexico) - Dr. Fanatik
- (Mexico) - Eddy y Los Grasosos
- (Mexico) - El Brujo
- (Spain) - El Columpio Asesino
- (Mexico) - El Haragán y Compañia
- (Mexico) - El Personal
- (Spain) - Enrique Bunbury
- (Mexico) - Esperantho
- (Spain) - Estirpe
- (United Kingdom) - Fatboy Slim
- (Mexico) - Forastero y Manicomio Clan
- (United States) - Foster the People
- (Chile) - Francisca Valenzuela
- (Mexico) - Furland
- (Mexico) - GG Bross
- (United States) - Gogol Bordello
- (Mexico) - Hello Seahorse!
- (Mexico) - Hocico
- (Mexico) (Chile) - HopPo!
- (Mexico) - Hueco
- (Argentina) - Illya Kuryaki and the Valderramas
- (Mexico) - Instituto Mexicano del Sonido
- (Mexico) - Jaime López
- (Argentina) - Jauría
- (Chile) - Javiera Mena
- (Mexico) - Jazztec
- (Mexico) - Jinetes Eléctricos
- (Mexico) - Juan Cirerol
- (Mexico) - Jumbo
- (Argentina) - Kapanga
- (United Kingdom) - Kasabian
- (Mexico) - Kinky
- (Mexico) - La Lupita
- (Venezuela) - La Vida Bohème
- (Argentina) - Los Caligaris
- (Mexico) - Los Drama Queers
- (Mexico) - Los Esquizitos
- (Mexico) - Los Infierno
- (Mexico) - Los Kung-Fu Monkeys
- (Mexico) - Los Meffisto
- (Mexico) - Los Patita de Perro
- (Mexico) - Lost Acapulco
- (United Kingdom) - Madness
- (Mexico) - Mal'akh
- (Mexico) - Mamá Pulpa
- (Mexico) - Mamastróficos
- (Spain) - Manel
- (Spain) - Manos de Topo
- (Mexico) - Maskatesta
- (Mexico) - Mexican Dubwiser
- (Mexico) - Molotov
- (Colombia) - Monareta
- (Mexico) - Monocordio
- (Spain) (United States) - Napoleón Solo
- (Mexico) - Niña
- (Argentina) - Nonpalidece
- (Argentina) (Mexico) - Paté de Fuá
- (Chile) - Pedro Piedra
- (Chile) - Perrosky
- (Mexico) - Phito Torres
- (Mexico) - Puerquerama
- (Mexico) - Qbo
- (Mexico) - Rebel Cats
- (Mexico) - Ricardo Asociados "Zanate"
- (Chile) - Ritmo Machine
- (Mexico) - Ritmo Peligroso
- (Mexico) - Robota
- (Mexico) - Rod Levario
- (United States) - Screaming Headless Torsos
- (Mexico) - Sekta Core!
- (Mexico) - Selecto-On
- (Spain) - SFDK
- (Mexico) (Japan) - Shokora
- (Colombia) - Skampida
- (Mexico) - Siddhartha
- (Argentina) - Sr. Flavio
- (Argentina) - Sol Pereyra
- (Mexico) - Sonido San Francisco
- (Mexico) - Suave as Hell
- (Colombia) - Systema Solar
- (Mexico) (Italy) - Tamales de Chipil
- (Mexico) - Tanke
- (United Kingdom) - The Horrors
- (Mexico) - The Sconek-t
- (Mexico) - The Volture
- (Mexico) - The Wookies
- (Mexico) - Toy Selectah
- (Mexico) - Triciclo Circus Band
- (Mexico) - Tropikal Forever
- (Mexico) - Tungas
- (United States) - TV on the Radio
- (Mexico) - URSS Bajo el Árbol
- (Colombia) - V for Volume
- (Mexico) - Venado Azul
- (Mexico) - Vesspa
- (Spain) - Vetusta Morla
- (Mexico) - Vicente Gayo
- (Mexico) - Voltax
- (Mexico) - Wrokk
- (Mexico) - Zaide
- (Mexico) - Zoé

== March 2013 ==
Thursday, 14 March - Sunday, 17 March

- (Austria) - !Deladap
- (Mexico) - A Band of Bitches
- (Mexico) - Afrodita
- (Chile) - Aiken
- (Chile) - Alex Andwanter
- (Mexico) - Apolo
- (Dominican Republic) (Spain) - Arianna Puello
- (Mexico) - Armando Palomas
- (Mexico) - Arreola + Carballo
- (Mexico) - Austin TV
- (Mexico) - Balkanbeats
- (Argentina) - Banda de Turistas
- (Mexico) - Bengala
- (United Kingdom) - Blur
- (Colombia) - Bomba Estéreo
- (United States) - Bosnian Rainbows
- (Spain) - Cabo San Roque
- (Chile) - Camila Moreno
- (Mexico) - Candy
- (Mexico) - Carla Morrison
- (Mexico) - Celso Piña
- (Mexico) - Centavrvs
- (United States) (France) - Chicha Libre
- (Chile) - Chico Trujillo
- (Mexico) - Comisario Pantera
- (Spain) - Corizonas
- (Puerto Rico) - Cultura Profética
- (Mexico) - Dapuntobeat
- (Mexico) - Dardo
- (Mexico) - De Nalgas
- (Mexico) - División Minúscula
- (Mexico) - DLD
- (Spain) - Dorian
- (Argentina) - Dread Mar I
- (Uruguay) - El Cuarteto de Nos
- (Argentina) - Él Mató a un Policia Motorizado
- (Mexico) - El Tri
- (Mexico) - Enjambre
- (Colombia) - Esteman
- (Mexico) - Faltosos
- (Mexico) - Fenómeno Fuzz
- (Mexico) - Flip Tamez
- (Mexico) - Fobia
- (Peru) - Francois Peglau
- (Uruguay) - Franny Glass
- (Mexico) - Garrobos
- (Chile) - Gepe
- (Mexico) - Golden Ganga
- (Mexico) - Here Comes the Kraken
- (Mexico) - Inclanfunk
- (Canada) - Japandroids
- (Mexico) (Spain) (United Kingdom) - Jenny and the Mexicats
- (Italy) - Jovanotti
- (Mexico) - Juan Cirerol
- (Paraguay) - Kchiporros
- (Mexico) - La Banderville
- (Mexico) - La Furia con Lujuria Sonidera
- (Mexico) - Las Victimas del Doctor Cerebro
- (Mexico) - Lazcano Malo
- (Mexico) - Le Baron
- (Mexico) - Leider
- (Mexico) - Liber Terán
- (Mexico) - Los Aguas Aguas
- (Venezuela) - Los Amigos Invisibles
- (Mexico) - Los Ángeles Azules
- (Argentina) - Los Auténticos Decadentes
- (Costa Rica) - Los Cuchillos
- (Mexico) - Los Daniels
- (Argentina) - Los Fabulosos Cadillacs
- (Mexico) - Los Jaigüey
- (Mexico) - Los Macuanos
- (Spain) - Los Punsetes
- (Mexico) - Los Románticos de Zacatecas
- (Mexico) - Los Viejos
- (Spain) - Love of Lesbian
- (Spain) - Mala Rodríguez
- (Uruguay) - Max Capote
- (Argentina) - Mompox
- (Colombia) - Monsieur Periné
- (Chile) - Mostro
- (Mexico) - Motor
- (Mexico) - Nabuzenco
- (Mexico) - Naftalina
- (Mexico) - Natalia Lafourcade
- (Puerto Rico) - Negros Vivos
- (Mexico) - Nortec Collective Presents: Bostich + Fussible
- (Mexico) - Ocean's Aoustic
- (Mexico) - Odisseo
- (Colombia) - Ondatrópica
- (Mexico) - Orka
- (Panama) - Orquesta Garash
- (Mexico) - Panteón Rococó
- (Mexico) - Pato Machete
- (Spain) - Pegasvs
- (Mexico) - Pez Diablo
- (Mexico) - Porter
- (Colombia) - Puerto Candelaria
- (United States) - Quinto Sol
- (Mexico) (United States) - Radio Kaos
- (Spain) - Rarefolk
- (Mexico) - Real de Catorce
- (United States) - Red Oblivion
- (Mexico) - Renoh
- (Mexico) - Salón Victoria
- (Spain) - Seward
- (Panama) - Señor Loop
- (United States) - Silversun Pickups
- (Spain) - Ska-P
- (Mexico) - Sonido Changoramico
- (Mexico) - Sonido San Francisco
- (Mexico) - Sonido Desconocido
- (Mexico) - Sonido Gallo Negro
- (Chile) - Sonido Landon
- (Spain) - Soziedad Alkoholika
- (Mexico) - Split Heaven
- (Mexico) - Sussie 4
- (Australia) - Tame Impala
- (Mexico) - Tex Tex
- (Mexico) - The Drágulas
- (Mexico) - Tio Gus
- (Mexico) - Twin Tones
- (Venezuela) - Ulises Hadjis
- (United Kingdom) - Underworld
- (Colombia) - Via Rústica
- (Spain) - Violadores del Verso
- (Mexico) - Volcán
- (Spain) - Xoel López
- (United States) - Yeah Yeah Yeahs
- (Mexico) - Yokozuna

=== Changes, cancelations and surprise acts ===
- (United Kingdom) - Morrissey (Canceled)
- (Mexico) - Enjambre 14/03/2013 -> 15/03/2013
- (Spain) - Pegasvs 14/03/2013 -> 15/03/2013
- (Mexico) - Centavrvs 14/03/2013 -> 15/03/2013

== March 2014 ==
- (Belgium) - 2 Many DJ's
- (United States) - AFI
- (Colombia) - Alerta Kamarada
- (Mexico) - Alex Otaola & Iraida Noriega
- (Mexico) - Amandititita
- (France) (Chile) - Ana Tijoux
- (Canada) - Arcade Fire
- (Mexico) - Atto & the Majestics
- (Spain) - Aurora
- (Brazil) - Autoramas
- (Mexico) - Banda Bastón
- (Mexico) - Banda Bostik
- (Mexico) - Búngalo Dub ft. Lengualerta
- (Mexico) - Caballeros del Plan G
- (Argentina) - Cállate Mark
- (Puerto Rico) - Calle 13
- (Mexico) - Caloncho
- (Chile) - Camila Moreno
- (Mexico) - Carlos Marks
- (Argentina) - Carlos Méndez
- (Mexico) - Carmen Costa
- (Argentina) - Carnavale Di Vendetta
- (Mexico) - Ceci Bastida
- (Argentina) - Chancha Vía Circuito
- (Mexico) - Charlie Montana
- (Argentina) (Spain) (Colombia) - Che Sudaka
- (Mexico) - Choclock
- (Colombia) - ChocQuibTown
- (Mexico) - Clubz
- (Mexico) - Coctél Intergaláctico
- (Mexico) - Coda
- (Chile) - Cómo Asesinar a Felipes
- (Colombia) - Consulado Popular
- (Mexico) - Cooper Gamins
- (Australia) - Cut Copy
- (Argentina) - Dancing Mood
- (Argentina) - Daniela Spalla
- (Mexico) - Daniel Maloso
- (Uruguay) - Dani Umpi
- (Mexico) (Argentina) (Brazil) - De la Tierra
- (Colombia) - Diamante Eléctrico
- (United States) - Diplo
- (United States) - DJ Rupture
- (Colombia) - Doctor Krápula
- (Argentina) - El Chávez
- (Colombia) - El Freaky
- (Mexico) - El Gran Silencio
- (Mexico) - Elis Paprika
- (Mexico) - Ely Guerra
- (Bosnia and Herzegovina) (Serbia) - Emir Kusturica & The No Smoking Orchestra
- (Argentina) - Enanitos Verdes
- (Argentina) - Estelares
- (Mexico) - Férmin IV
- (Argentina) - Fito Páez
- (Argentina) - Frikstallers
- (Mexico) - Furland
- (Peru) - Gaia
- (Spain) - Guadalupe Plata
- (Ecuador) - Helado Negro
- (Mexico) - Hello Seahorse!
- (Mexico) - I Can Chase Dragons!
- (Mexico) - Javier Estrada
- (United States) - Jessica Hernández & The Deltas
- (Mexico) - Juan Soto
- (Chile) - Juana Fe
- (Argentina) - Juana Molina
- (Mexico) - Julieta Venegas
- (Mexico) - Jumbo
- (Norway) - Kakkmaddafakka
- (Mexico) - Komodo
- (Colombia) - Kraken
- (Spain) - L.A.
- (Spain) - La Bien Querida
- (Mexico) - La Castañeda
- (Mexico) - La Gusana Ciega
- (Mexico) - Lao
- (Chile) - La Ley
- (Mexico) (United States) - La Santa Cecilia
- (Uruguay) - La Vela Puerca
- (Venezuela) - La Vida Bohème
- (Brazil) - Leo Justi
- (Mexico) - Liquits
- (Mexico) - Little Jesus
- (Spain) - Lori Meyers
- (Chile) - Los Bunkers
- (Argentina) - Los Cafres
- (Argentina) - Los Caligaris
- (Mexico) - Los Esquizitos
- (Mexico) - Los Fascinantes
- (Mexico) - Los Fontana
- (Mexico) - Los Infierno
- (Mexico) - Los Inmortales SA
- (Mexico) - Los Marty
- (Spain) - Los Planetas
- (Mexico) - Los Rastrillos
- (United States) - Los Rumberos de Boston
- (Mexico) - Los Tigres del Norte
- (Guatemala) - Los Tiros
- (Chile) - Los Tres
- (Spain) - Love of Lesbian
- (Canada) - Lunice
- (Mexico) - Luzbel
- (Mexico) - Machingon
- (Guyana) - Mad Professor
- (Mexico) - Maldita Vecindad y los Hijos del Quinto Patio
- (Mexico) - Mooi
- (Russia) - Motorama
- (United States) - Nine Inch Nails
- (Uruguay) - No Te Va Gustar
- (Mexico) - Odisseo
- (United States) - Of Montreal
- (Argentina) - Onda Vaga
- (United States) - Outernational
- (Mexico) - Pablito Mix
- (Mexico) - Pato Watson
- (Chile) - Pedro Piedra
- (Mexico) - Pellejos
- (United Kingdom) - Placebo
- (Mexico) - Proyecto Maconha
- (United Kingdom) - Quantic
- (Mexico) - Radaid
- (Mexico) - Rebel Cats
- (Mexico) - Reyno
- (Mexico) - Rey Pila
- (Mexico) - Royal Club
- (United Kingdom) - Rusko
- (Chile) - RVSB
- (Mexico) - Sangre Maíz
- (Mexico) - Saoko
- (Germany) - Schlachthofbronx
- (Mexico) - Segregados
- (Colombia) - Seis Peatones
- (Mexico) - Siete Catorce
- (Mexico) - Silverio
- (Mexico) - Simpson a Huevo
- (Mexico) - Sonido La Changa
- (Bolivia) - Sonido Martines
- (Mexico) - Sonido San Francisco
- (Mexico) - Sonido Sonorámico
- (Uruguay) - Sonido Super Chango
- (Mexico) - Señor Bikini
- (Spain) - Standstill
- (Spain) - Tako
- (Mexico) - Technicolor Fabrics
- (United States) - The Burning of Rome
- (Mexico) - The Cavernarios
- (United States) - The Polyphonic Spree
- (Denmark) - The Sexican
- (Mexico) - The Wookies
- (United States) - Todd Clouser & A Love Electric
- (Mexico) - Torreblanca
- (Mexico) - Troker
- (United States) - Twenty One Pilots
- (Mexico) - Un Día de Octubre
- (Mexico) - URSS Bajo el Árbol
- (Mexico) - Vicente Gayo
- (United States) - Vintage Trouble
- (Mexico) - Yokozuna
- (Mexico) - Zoé
- (Mexico) - Zurdok
- (Mexico) - Zutzut!

=== Changes, cancellations and surprise acts ===
- (Argentina) - Cadena Perpetua (Canceled)
- (United States) - DJ Rashad & DJ Spinn (Canceled)
- (United Kingdom) - Primal Scream (Canceled)
- (Mexico) - La Esfinge (Surprise Act)

== March 2015 ==
- (Argentina) - 2 Minutos
- (Mexico) - 3er. Acto
- (Costa Rica) - 424
- (Mexico) - A Band of Bitches
- (Uruguay) - Agarrate Catalina
- (Puerto Rico) - AJ Dávila
- (Mexico) - Andre VII
- (Brazil) - Apanhador Só
- (Finland) - Apocalyptica
- (Chile) - Ases Falsos
- (Colombia) - Aterciopelados
- (Argentina) - Babasónicos
- (Mexico) - Barrio Chachín
- (Colombia) - Bomba Estéreo
- (United States) - Brandon Flowers
- (Mexico) - Bufi
- (Mexico) - Caifanes
- (Mexico) - Camilo Séptimo
- (Mexico) - Cartel de Santa
- (Argentina) - Catupecu Machu
- (Mexico) - Centavrvs
- (Sweden) - Cocotaxi
- (Mexico) - Compass: Instituto Mexicano del Sonido & Toy Selectah
- (Mexico) - Corazón Attack
- (Mexico) - Cuca
- (United Kingdom) - Dave Crowe
- (United States) - Dave Matthews Band
- (Mexico) - Decibel
- (Peru) - Dengue Dengue Dengue
- (Chile) - Dënver
- (Argentina) - Detonantes
- (South Africa) - Die Antwoord
- (Mexico) - Disko Balkan
- (Mexico) - DLD
- (Spain) - El Columpio Asesino
- (Mexico) - El Gran Karim & Aztek 732
- (Argentina) - El Hijo de la Cumbia
- (Argentina) - Él Mató a un Policía Motorizado
- (Mexico) - Enjambre
- (Mexico) - Erszebeth
- (Mexico) - Galatzia
- (United States) - Garbage
- (Mexico) - Genitallica
- (Mexico) - Gil Cerezo
- (United Kingdom) - Happy Mondays
- (Mexico) - Hawaiian Gremlins
- (United States) - Interpol
- (Mexico) - Interpuesto
- (Mexico) - Iraida Noriega y La Groovy Band
- (Mexico) - Jandro
- (Mexico) - Jefes del Desierto
- (Mexico) - Joliette
- (Uruguay) - Jorge Drexler
- (Mexico) - Juan Cirerol
- (Mexico) - Julie Doppler
- (Panama) - K.e.e.n.e.
- (Mexico) - La Lupita
- (Costa Rica) - La Milixia
- (Colombia) - La Minitik del Miedo
- (Mexico) - La Revolución de Emiliano Zapata
- (Mexico) - La Sucursal de la Cumbia
- (Colombia) - La Tostadora
- (Cuba) - Leiden
- (Chile) - Los Ángeles Negros
- (Mexico) - Los Elásticos
- (Spain) - Los Fresones Rebeldes
- (Mexico) - Los Románticos de Zacatecas
- (Argentina) - Los Rusos Hijos de Puta
- (Mexico) - Los Victorios
- (Mexico) - Louie Fresco
- (Chile) - Lucybell
- (Argentina) - Lumumba
- (Chile) - María del Pilar
- (Chile) - Mariel Mariel
- (United States) - Mastodon
- (Chile) - Matías Aguayo
- (Mexico) - Mc Peligro
- (Mexico) - Meketrefe
- (Mexico) - Metrika
- (Mexico) - Mississippi Queens
- (Mexico) - Molotov
- (United Kingdom) - Molotov Jukebox
- (Chile) - Mon Laferte
- (Colombia) - Monsieur Periné
- (Venezuela) - Mr. Pauer
- (Spain) - Nacho Vegas
- (Mexico) - Nortec Collective Presents: Bostich + Fussible
- (Mexico) - O Tortuga
- (United States) - Omar Torrez
- (Mexico) - Operación Jarocha & Los Vega
- (Colombia) - Polyterror
- (Argentina) - Poncho
- (Mexico) - Presidente
- (United Kingdom) - Robert Plant & The Sensational Space Shifters
- (Mexico) - Roll Circus
- (Mexico) - S7N
- (Australia) - San Cisco
- (Mexico) - San Pascualito Rey
- (Mexico) - Sánchez Dub & Bn Loco
- (Mexico) - Seconds
- (Mexico) - Siddhartha
- (Mexico) - Slktr
- (United States) - Soldiers of Jah Army
- (Mexico) - Sonido Gallo Negro
- (Mexico) - Sonido La Conga
- (Mexico) - Sonido Pancho
- (Mexico) - Sotomayor
- (United States) - Subatomic Sound System
- (Colombia) - Superlitio
- (Mexico) - Supersónicos
- (Mexico) - Telefunka
- (Mexico) - The John Band
- (United States) - The Last Internationale
- (Mexico) - The Melovskys
- (United Kingdom) - The Specials
- (United Kingdom) - The Vaccines
- (Mali) - Tinariwen
- (Mexico) - Tino el Pingüino
- (Mexico) - Triciclo Circus Band
- (Mexico) - Tropikal Forever
- (Argentina) - Utopians
- (Argentina) - Violentango
- (Chile) - We Are the Grand
- (Mexico) - Ximena Sariñana
- (Mexico) - Zaide
- (Chile) (France) - Zonora Point & King Dou Dou

=== Changes, cancellations and surprise acts ===
- (Spain) - Loquillo (Canceled)
- (Panama) - Leo Pérez (Canceled)
- (United States) - NOFX (Canceled)
- (Mexico) - Ágora (Surprise Act)
- (Mexico) - Austin TV (Surprise Act)
- (Mexico) - Rebel Cats (Surprise Act)
- (Mexico) - Natalia Lafourcade & Meme (of Café Tacuba) (Surprise Act)
- (Mexico) - Quiero Club (Surprise Act)
- (Mexico) - Liquits & Jessy Bulbo (Surprise Act)

== April 2016 ==
- (Mexico) - Agrupación Cariño
- (Mexico) - Ampersan
- (Mexico) - Apolo
- (United States) - Baroness
- (Mexico) - Big Big Love
- (Mexico) - Black Overdrive
- (Mexico) - Café Tacuba
- (Chile) - Camila Moreno
- (Mexico) - Carla Morrison
- (Mexico) - Charlie Rodd
- (Mexico) - Chetes
- (Mexico) - Clemente Castillo
- (Mexico) - Comisario Pantera
- (Puerto Rico) - Cultura Profética
- (Mexico) - De Nalgas
- (Mexico) - Disco Ruido
- (Mexico) - DLD
- (Spain) - Dorian
- (Guatemala) - Easy Easy
- (Mexico) - Eddie y Los Grasosos
- (Mexico) - El Juguete Rabioso
- (Spain) - Enrique Bunbury
- (Chile) - Gepe
- (Bosnia and Herzegovina) - Goran Bregović
- (Argentina) - Gustavo Cordera
- (Mexico) - Heavy Nopal
- (France) (Cuba) - Ibeyi
- (Argentina) - Indios
- (Mexico) - Ingrid Beaujean
- (Mexico) - Julio Revueltas
- (Peru) - Kanaku y El Tigre
- (Mexico) - Kike
- (Mexico) - Kill Aniston
- (Colombia) (Belgium) (Vietnam) (France) - La Chiva Gantiva
- (Colombia) - La Real Academia del Sonido
- (Argentina) - Las Manos de Filippi
- (Mexico) - León Larregui
- (Mexico) - Liquits
- (Mexico) - Los Abominables
- (Argentina) - Los Auténticos Decadentes
- (Mexico) - Los Frankys
- (Mexico) - Los Norteños Light
- (Spain) - Los Toreros Muertos
- (Mexico) - Los Viejos
- (Mexico) - Los Yerberos
- (Mexico) - Lost Acapulco
- (Colombia) - Lospetitfellas
- (Mexico) - Love la Femme
- (Mexico) - Maligno
- (Venezuela) - Mcklopedia
- (Spain) - Nach
- (Mexico) - Natalia Lafourcade
- (Uruguay) - No Te Va Gustar
- (Mexico) - Nunca Jamás
- (Iceland) - Of Monsters and Men
- (Costa Rica) - Ojo de Buey
- (Colombia) - Pedrina y Rio
- (Mexico) - Piluso
- (Mexico) - Plastilina Mosh
- (Mexico) - Porter
- (Mexico) - Pressive
- (Mexico) - Pumcayó
- (Mexico) - Qbo
- (Mexico) - Rain Shatter
- (Mexico) - Reyno
- (Mexico) - Rock en tu Idioma Sinfónico
- (United Kingdom) - Savages
- (Mexico) - Sekta Core!
- (Mexico) - Silva de Alegría
- (Mexico) - Sputnik
- (Argentina) - Surfistas del Sistema
- (Colombia) - Systema Solar
- (Mexico) - Tex Tex
- (United States) (Mexico) - The Chamanas
- (Mexico) - The Guadaloops
- (United Kingdom) - The Prodigy
- (Argentina) - Todos Tus Muertos
- (Argentina) - Tototomás
- (Mexico) - Tungas
- (United Kingdom) - Two Door Cinema Club
- (Argentina) - Vetamadre
- (Argentina) - Vicentico

== March 2017 ==
- (Mexico) - Agora
- (Costa Rica) - Akasha
- (Mexico) - Antidoping
- (Colombia) - Árbol de Ojos
- (Argentina) - Attaque 77
- (Argentina) - Babasónicos
- (Mexico) - Beta
- (Mexico) - Bronco
- (United States) (Mexico) - Brujeria
- (France) (Colombia) (Chile) - Burning Caravan
- (Mexico) - Candy
- (Spain) - Carlos Sadness
- (Spain) - Celtas Cortos
- (Mexico) - Chingadazo de Kung-Fu
- (Mexico) - Costera
- (Colombia) - Crew Peligrosos
- (Colombia) - Diamante Electrico
- (Colombia) - Doctor Krápula
- (Mexico) - Dolores de Huevos
- (Argentina) - Dread Mar-I
- (Uruguay) - El Cuarteto de Nos
- (Argentina) (Uruguay) (Brazil) - El General Paz & La Triple Frontera
- (Argentina) - El Zombie
- (Argentina) - Enanitos Verdes
- (Colombia) - Esteman
- (Argentina) - Faauna
- (Mexico) - Fanko
- (United States) - Foxygen
- (United States) - G-Eazy
- (Spain) - Hombres G
- (Argentina) - Illya Kuryaki and the Valderramas
- (Mexico) - Inspector
- (Spain) - Izal
- (United Kingdom) - Jake Bugg
- (Spain) - Jarabe de Palo
- (Germany) (Spain) - Javier Corcobado
- (Mexico) - Jazmín Solar
- (Mexico) - Juana la Rodillona
- (Mexico) - JotDog
- (United States) (Mexico) - Julieta Venegas
- (France) - Justice
- (Mexico) - Kinky
- (Mexico) - La Barranca
- (Spain) - La Pegatina
- (Mexico) - La Sonora Santanera
- (Mexico) - La Tremenda Korte
- (Mexico) - Lira N' Roll
- (Mexico) - Little Jesus
- (Mexico) - Lng/SHT
- (Argentina) - Los Caligaris
- (Mexico) - Los Desenchufados
- (Argentina) - Los Fabulosos Cadillacs
- (Mexico) - Los Rayobacks
- (Mexico) - Los Veltons
- (United States) - Marky Ramone
- (Mexico) - Meme
- (Mexico) - Mexican Dubwiser
- (Mexico) - Mexican Juligans
- (Chile) - Mon Laferte
- (Mexico) - Monocordio
- (Portugal) - Moonspell
- (Mexico) - Morenito de Fuego
- (Mexico) - Neón
- (Spain) - Novedades Carminha
- (Venezuela) - Okills
- (United States) - Orkesta Mendoza
- (Mexico) - Orquesta 24 Cuadros
- (Mexico) - Out of Control Army
- (United States) - Prophets of Rage
- (United States) - Rancid
- (Mexico) - Seis Pistos
- (Argentina) - Shoot the Radio
- (Mexico) - Tessa Ia
- (Japan) - The 5.6.7.8's
- (Mexico) - The Cavernarios
- (United States) - The Pretty Reckless
- (Mexico) - Thermo
- (Chile) - We Are the Grand
- (United States) - Xixa
- (Mexico) - Zoé

=== Changes, cancellations and surprise acts ===
- (United States) - Wakrat (Canceled)

== March 2018 ==
- (Costa Rica) - 424
- (Argentina) - A.N.I.M.A.L.
- (Argentina) - Airbag
- (Mexico) - Allison
- (Mexico) - Amandititita
- (Mexico) - Banda Bastón
- (Mexico) - Banda Regional Mixe
- (Spain) - Belako
- (Mexico) - Camilo Séptimo
- (Mexico) - Cartel de Santa
- (Mexico) - Centavrvs
- (United States) - Chicano Batman
- (Mexico) - Cuca
- (Colombia) - Donkristobal
- (Mexico) - El David Aguilar
- (Argentina) - Él Mató a un Policía Motorizado
- (Colombia) - Elsa y Elmar
- (Mexico) - Enjambre
- (Costa Rica) - Entrelineas
- (Argentina) - Francisca y Los Exploradores vs Juan Ingaramo
- (Argentina) - Fito Páez
- (Brazil) - Francisco, El Hombre
- (United Kingdom) - Gorillaz
- (Chile) - Gondwana
- (Mexico) - El Haragán y Compañía
- (Argentina) - Heavysaurios
- (Israel) - Infected Mushroom
- (Mexico) - Instituto Mexicano del Sonido
- (Mexico) - José Octavio I
- (Colombia) (United States) - Kali Uchis
- (Paraguay) - Kchiporros
- (Spain) - Kase.O
- (Argentina) - Klub (Los Autenticos Reggaementes)
- (Chile) - Kuervos del Sur
- (Argentina) - La Beriso
- (Mexico) - La Gusana Ciega
- (Mexico) - La Lupita
- (Colombia) - La Toma
- (Uruguay) - La Vela Puerca
- (Colombia) - La Vodkanera
- (Argentina) - Las Pastillas del Abuelo
- (Mexico) - Leslie Grun
- (Sweden) - Little Dragon
- (Mexico) - Los Amantes de Lola
- (Venezuela) - Los Amigos Invisibles
- (Mexico) - Los Blenders
- (Argentina) - Los Cafres
- (Mexico) - Los de Abajo
- (Chile) - Los Jaivas
- (Venezuela) - Los Mesoneros
- (Mexico) - Los Moustros del Espacio Exterior
- (Argentina) - Los Pericos
- (Spain) - Love of Lesbian
- (Spain) - Mala Rodríguez
- (Mexico) - Maria Daniela y su Sonido Lasser
- (Mexico) - Millonario
- (Mexico) - Molotov
- (United Kingdom) - Morrissey
- (Ecuador) - Nicola Cruz
- (United Kingdom) - Noel Gallagher's High Flying Birds
- (Mexico) - No Tiene la Vaca
- (Mexico) - Panteón Rococó
- (Mexico) (Argentina) (Brazil) - Paté de Fuá
- (Russia) - Pussy Riot
- (United States) - PVRIS
- (United States) - Queens of the Stone Age
- (Puerto Rico) - Residente
- (Mexico) - Riesgo de Contagio
- (Mexico) - Ritmo Peligroso
- (Mexico) - Sabino
- (Mexico) - San Pascualito Rey
- (Mexico) - Santa Estilo
- (Mexico) - Sierra León
- (Mexico) - Sergio Arau & Los Heavy Mex
- (Spain) - Sexy Zebras
- (Ecuador) (Colombia) (Venezuela) (Austria) (United States) - Swing Original Monks
- (Mexico) - Rock en tu Idioma Sinfonico - Vol. II
- (Mexico) - Titán
- (Mexico) - Übon
- (Mexico) - Vaya Futuro
- (Spain) - Vetusta Morla
- (Mexico) - Víctimas del Doctor Cerebro
- (Guatemala) - Viernes Verde

=== Changes, cancellations and surprise acts ===
- (Chile) - Los Tres (Cancelled)

== March 2019 ==
- (Mexico) - Alemán
- (Mexico) - Alfonso Andre y Amigos presents: Tribute to David Bowie
- (Colombia) - Bomba Estereo
- (Mexico) - Bengala
- (Mexico) - Cafe Tacvba
- (Mexico) - Caifanes
- (Spain) - Correos
- (Argentina) - Daniela Spalla
- (United States) - Dillon Francis
- (Mexico) - Division Minuscula
- (Puerto Rico) (United States) - Draco Rosa
- (United Kingdom) - Editors
- (Mexico) - El Gran Silencio
- (Mexico) - El Tri
- (Spain) - Enrique Bunbury
- (United States) - Fantastic Negrito
- (Mexico) - Fermín IV
- (United States) - Flor de Toloache
- (United Kingdom) - Foals
- (Mexico) - Fobia
- (Mexico) - Galindo
- (Costa Rica) - Gandhi
- (Argentina) - Guasones
- (United Kingdom) - Hælos
- (Mexico) - Hello Seahorse!
- (Spain) - Ilegales
- (United States) - Intocable
- (Colombia) - Juanes
- (Argentina) - Juanse
- (Mexico) - Javier Batiz
- (Mexico) - Jumbo
- (Mexico) - Kill Aniston
- (United States) - Korn
- (Mexico) - La Castañeda
- (Mexico) - La Pingos Orquesta
- (Mexico) - La Sexta Vocal
- (Mexico) - Liquits
- (Chile) - Los Tres
- (Mexico) - Lanza Internacional
- (Mexico) - Los Afro Brothers
- (Mexico) - Los Estrambóticos
- (Mexico) - Los Viejos
- (United States) - LP
- (Mexico) - Lucha Libre AAA Worldwide
- (Mexico) - Machingon
- (Colombia) - Mad Tree
- (Ecuador) - Mateo Kingman
- (Argentina) - Miguel Mateos
- (Argentina) - Miranda!
- (Spain) - Nach
- (Mexico) - Noah Pino Palo
- (Mexico) - Odisseo
- (Japan) - Oi-Skall Mates
- (Mexico) - Orquesta Damaso Perez Prado
- (Spain) - Orquesta Mondragon
- (Mexico) - Óscar Chávez
- (Mexico) - Rastrillos
- (Venezuela) - Rawayana
- (Mexico) - Rude Boys
- (Mexico) (United States) - Santana
- (Mexico) - Santa Sabina
- (Mexico) - Siddhartha
- (Spain) - Ska-P
- (South Africa) (Netherlands) - Skip & Die
- (United Kingdom) - Snow Patrol
- (Mexico) - Sonido Gallo Negro
- (Colombia) - Stoner Love
- (Belgium) - Technotronic
- (United Kingdom) - The 1975
- (United States) - The Bomboras
- (France) - The Inspector Cluzo
- (Mexico) - The Plastics Revolution
- (Argentina) - Turf
- (United States) - Too Many Zooz
- (Mexico) - Tino el Pinguino
- (Mexico) - Vaquero Negro
- (Spain) - Viva Suecia
- (Mexico) - Ximena Sariñana
- (Chile) - Zona Ganjah

== March 2020 ==
- (Chile) - 31 Minutos
- (United States) - All Them Witches
- (United States) - Ambar Lucid
- (Argentina) - Andres Calamaro
- (Mexico) - Armando Palomas
- (Argentina) - Babasonicos
- (Mexico) - Batallas de Campeones
- (Argentina) - Bersuit Vergarabat
- (Spain) - Bizanga
- (United States) - Black Pumas
- (Mexico) - Bratty
- (Spain) - Carlos Sadness
- (Colombia) - Carlos Vives
- (Mexico) - Charles Ans
- (Mexico) - Chetes
- (Chile) - Chico Trujillo
- (Uruguay) - Cuarteto de Nos
- (Puerto Rico) - Cultura Profetica
- (Argentina) - Damas Gratis
- (Venezuela) - Desorden Publico
- (Mexico) - Disidente
- (Mexico) - DLD
- (Argentina) - Duki
- (Mexico) - Ed Maverick
- (Mexico) - El Poder del Barrio
- (Spain) - Elefantes
- (Mexico) - Ely Guerra
- (Spain) - Fangoria
- (Argentina) - Feria de Frescos
- (Mexico) - Flor Amargo
- (Chile) - Francisca Valenzuela
- (Mexico) - Gera MX
- (Mexico) - Girl Ultra
- (Mexico) - Golden Ganga
- (United States) - Guns N' Roses
- (Argentina) - Gustavo Santaolalla
- (Mexico) - Hamac Caziim
- (Argentina) - Indios
- (United Kingdom) (Democratic Republic of the Congo) - Jupiter & Okwess
- (Japan) - Kyary Pamyu Pamyu
- (Mexico) - La Bruja de Texcoco
- (Colombia) - La Doble A
- (Mexico) - La Garfield
- (Spain) - Leiva
- (Mexico) - Little Jesus
- (Mexico) - Los Daniels
- (Mexico) - Los Tucanes de Tijuana
- (Mexico) - Lucha Libre AAA Worldwide
- (Mexico) - Madame Recamier
- (Mexico) - MexFutura
- (Germany) - Milky Chance
- (United Kingdom) - Mogwai
- (Mexico) - Negro y Las Nieves de Enero
- (Mexico) - Nortec Collective: Bostich + Fussible
- (Colombia) - Odio a Botero
- (Chile) - Pillanes
- (Mexico) - Porter
- (United States) - Portugal. The Man
- (Mexico) - Rebel Cats
- (Mexico) - Rey Pila
- (Mexico) - Reyno
- (Mexico) - Rodrigo y Gabriela
- (Mexico) - Rubytates
- (Mexico) - Salón Victoria
- (Mexico) - Salvador y el Unicornio
- (Mexico) - Say Ocean
- (United States) - She Wants Revenge
- (Spain) - SHO-TAI
- (Mexico) - Silvana Estrada
- (Sweden) - Skott
- (Belgium) - Soulwax
- (Sweden) - The Cardigans
- (Netherlands) - The Phantom Four
- (Finland) - The Rasmus
- (Mexico) - The Warning
- (Mexico) - The Wookies
- (Argentina) - Usted Señalemelo
- (Mexico) - Valsian
- (Spain) - Vetusta Morla
- (Argentina) - Vicentico
- (Mexico) - Victoria Malawi
- (Mexico) - Yucatan a Go-Go
- (Argentina) - Zero Kill
- (Mexico) - Zoe

== March 2022 ==
- (Mexico) - Aczino
- (United States) - All Them Witches
- (United States) - Ambar Lucid
- (Mexico) - Banda MS
- (Mexico) (Argentina) (Chile) (Spain) - Batallas de Campeones
- (Spain) - Biznaga
- (Bolivia) - Blssom
- (United States) - Black Pumas
- (Mexico) - Bruses
- (Mexico) - Camilo Séptimo
- (Mexico) - Cecilia Toussaint
- (Mexico) - Centavrvs
- (Argentina) - Conociendo Rusia
- (Spain) - C. Tangana
- (Mexico) - Cnvs
- (Mexico) - Daniel Quien
- (United States) (Venezuela) - Devendra Banhart
- (Argentina) - Dread Mar-I
- (Mexico) - Elis Paprika
- (Mexico) - Erich
- (Argentina) - Eruca Sativa
- (Spain) - Fangoria
- (Mexico) - Fernando Delgadillo
- (United States) - Gary Clark Jr.
- (Chile) - Gepe
- (Mexico) - Gran Sur
- (United States) - Grandson
- (Argentina) - Gustavo Santaolalla
- (Mexico) - Javier Blake
- (Mexico) - Julieta Venegas
- (Mexico) - Kevin Kaarl
- (Colombia) - La Banda del Bisonte
- (Argentina) - La Delio Valdez
- (Mexico) - La Gusana Ciega
- (Mexico) - La Isla Centeno
- (Mexico) - La Lupita
- (Panama) - La Tribu
- (Argentina) - Los Auténticos Decadentes
- (United States) - Limp Bizkit
- (Mexico) - Los Blenders
- (Mexico) - Lucha Libre AAA Worldwide
- (Colombia) (Canada) - Lido Pimienta
- (Mexico) - Los Cogelones
- (Argentina) - Los Fabulosos Cadillacs
- (Mexico) (Colombia) - Los No Tan Tristes (Gera MX, Nanpa Básico & Charles Ans)
- (Argentina) (Uruguay) - Los Señores
- (Argentina) - Luis Pescetti
- (Spain) - Love of Lesbian
- (United States) - Making Movies
- (Mexico) - Maldita Vecindad y los Hijos del Quinto Patio
- (Argentina) - Massacre
- (Germany) - Milky Chance
- (Mexico) - Moenia
- (United Kingdom) - Mogwai
- (Spain) - Nancys Rubias
- (Colombia) - Oh'laville
- (Venezuela) - Okills
- (Mexico) - Patrick Miller
- (Peru) - Pelo Madueño
- (Mexico) - Ramona
- (United States) - Pixies
- (Puerto Rico) - Residente
- (Mexico) - Serbia
- (Mexico) - Santa Fe Klan
- (Mexico) - Son Rompe Pera
- (Mexico) - Siddhartha
- (Spain) - Taburete
- (Mexico) - Technicolor Fabrics
- (United States) - The Marias
- (Argentina) - Trueno
- (Mexico) - Vanessa Zamora
- (Spain) - Vetusta Morla
- (Argentina) - Wos

== March 2023 ==
- (Argentina) - 2 Minutos
- (Mexico) - Alemán
- (Dominican Republic) - Álex Ferreira
- (Mexico) - Allison
- (United Kingdom) - Alt-J
- (Mexico) - Amandititita
- (Colombia) - Ästra
- (Mexico) - Austin TV
- (Mexico) - Astronomía Interior
- (Mexico) - Batalla de Campeones Delux
- (Argentina) - Bandalos Chinos
- (United States) - Buscabulla
- (Mexico) - Café Tacvba
- (Spain) - Cala Vento
- (Mexico) - Carín León
- (Mexico) - Carla Morrison
- (United Kingdom) - Circa Waves
- (Spain) - Coque Malla
- (Argentina) - Daniela Spalla
- (Chile) - De Saloon
- (Mexico) - Dharius
- (Argentina) - Duki
- (Colombia) - Elsa y Elmar
- (Mexico) - Enjambre
- (Argentina) - Estelares
- (Colombia) - Esteman
- (United States) - Gayle
- (Mexico) - Grupo Pesado
- (Spain) - Guitarricadelafuente
- (Mexico) - Justin Morales
- (Mexico) - Insurpipol
- (Spain) - Kase.O (Jazz Magnetism)
- (Mexico) - Kinky
- (France) - La Dame Blanche
- (Spain) - La Maravillosa Orquesta del Alcohol
- (United States) (Mexico) - La Santa Cecilia
- (Colombia) - Las Áñez
- (Argentina) - Las Ligas Menores
- (Mexico) - Lauri García
- (Spain) - Leiva
- (Mexico) - León Larregui
- (Mexico) - Leonardo de Lozanne
- (Mexico) - Lila Downs
- (Chile) - Los Bunkers
- (Argentina) - Los Caligaris
- (Mexico) - Los Claxons
- (Mexico) - Los Dynamite
- (Mexico) - Los Estrambóticos
- (Peru) - Los Mirlos
- (Argentina) - Los Pericos
- (Spain) - Los Santos Inocentes
- (Mexico) - Lost Acapulco
- (Mexico) - MC Davo
- (Argentina) - Miranda!
- (Spain) - Miss Caffeina
- (Colombia) - Monsieur Periné
- (Mexico) (Mexico) - Neto Peña & Yoss Bones
- (Mexico) - Odisseo
- (United Kingdom) - Paul Oakenfold
- (Mexico) - Plastilina Mosh
- (Mexico) - Qbo
- (Spain) - Queralt Lahoz
- (Argentina) - Rayos Láser
- (Mexico) - Real de Catorce
- (United States) - Red Hot Chili Peppers
- (Mexico) - Resorte
- (Mexico) - Reyno
- (Spain) - Sen Senra
- (Mexico) - Sergio Arau
- (Argentina) - Siamés
- (Spain) - Sidonie
- (Argentina) - Silvestre y la Naranja
- (Colombia) - Solo Valencia
- (Finland) - Steve 'n' Seagulls
- (United States) - The Black Crowes
- (Japan) - Tokyo Ska Paradise Orchestra
- (United Kingdom) - UB40
- (Mexico) - Vivir Quintana
- (Chile) - Yorka

== March 2024 ==
- (Mexico) - Akil Ammar
- (Colombia) - Alcolirykoz
- (Mexico) - Arroba Nat
- (Argentina) - Babasónicos
- (United States) - Bad Religion
- (Mexico) - Banda Bastón
- (Mexico) - Bratty
- (Mexico) - Belanova
- (United Kingdom) (United States) - Billy Idol
- (Mexico) - BuenRostro
- (United States) - Black Veil Brides
- (Mexico) - C-Kan
- (Puerto Rico) - Cabra
- (Mexico) - Cartel de Santa
- (Mexico) - Chingadazo de Kung-Fu
- (United States) - DannyLux
- (Argentina) - Dante Spinetta
- (Spain) - Depedro
- (Spain) - Depresión Sonora
- (Spain) - Destripando la Historia
- (Colombia) - Diamante Eléctrico
- (Spain) - El Columpio Asesino
- (United States) - Gogol Bordello
- (Argentina) - Fito Páez
- (Mexico) - Genitallica
- (United States) - Future Islands
- (Argentina) - Florián
- (United States) - Greta Van Fleet
- (Spain) - Hombres G
- (Mexico) - Insite
- (Mexico) - Instituto Mexicano del Sonido
- (France) - Isaac et Nora
- (United Kingdom) - James
- (Peru) - Jaze
- (Uruguay) - Jorge Drexler
- (Mexico) - José Madero
- (Mexico) - Junior H
- (Paraguay) - Kchiporros
- (Mexico) - Kerigma
- (Mexico) - Kevin Kaarl
- (United States) - Kings of Leon
- (Mexico) - La Adictiva
- (Mexico) - La Bande-son Imaginaire
- (Mexico) - La Castañeda
- (Spain) - La Pegatina
- (Uruguay) - La Vela Puerca
- (Mexico) - Las Ultrasónicas
- (Mexico) - Lng/SHT
- (Spain) - Lori Meyers
- (Argentina) - Los Cafres
- (Mexico) - Los Choclok
- (Mexico) - Los Infierno
- (United States) - Los Lobos
- (Mexico) - Los Muchachos (Simpson Ahuevo, Go Golden Junk & Robot95)
- (Spain) - Los Zigarros
- (Mexico) - Maná
- (Mexico) - Marissa Mur
- (Mexico) - Millonario
- (Spain) - Muerdo
- (Colombia) - Nash
- (Uruguay) - No Te Va Gustar
- (Mexico) - Out of Control Army
- (Mexico) - Panteón Rococó
- (Argentina) - Peces Raros
- (United States) - Poolside
- (United States) - Portugal. The Man
- (United States) - Prayers
- (Spain) - Ralphie Choo
- (Venezuela) - Rawayana
- (Mexico) - Renee
- (Mexico) - Sabino
- (Mexico) - Sad Breakfast
- (Argentina) - Sara Hebe
- (Mexico) - San Pascualito Rey
- (Germany) - Scorpions
- (United States) - Semisonic
- (Mexico) - Sgt. Papers
- (Mexico) - Silvana Estrada
- (Thailand) - Slot Machine
- (Mexico) - Sonido Gallo Negro
- (Mexico) - Stilo
- (Mexico) - Sussie 4
- (Mexico) - The Rambler's Blues Band
- (Mexico) - The Warning
- (Mexico) - Troker
- (Mexico) - Vaquero
- (Mexico) - Wiplash
- (Argentina) - YSY A
- (United States) - Yves Tumor

=== Changes, cancellations and surprise acts ===
- (United States) - Paramore (Canceled)
- (Germany) - Scorpions (Canceled)

== March 2025 ==
- (Colombia) - Alto Grado
- (Spain) - Arde Bogotá
- (Colombia) (Venezuela) - Astropical
- (Colombia) - Aterciopelados
- (Mexico) - Caifanes
- (Mexico) - Caloncho
- (Mexico) - cKovi
- (Mexico) - Clubz
- (Mexico) - Daniel, Me Estás Matando
- (Argentina) - Dillom
- (Mexico) - División Minúscula
- (Puerto Rico) - Draco Rosa
- (Mexico) - DRIMS
- (Spain) - Duncan Dhu
- (Chile) - Easykid
- (Mexico) - Edén Muñoz
- (Spain) - Efecto Pasillo
- (Uruguay) - El Cuarteto de Nos
- (Mexico) - El Gran Silencio
- (Mexico) - El Haragán y Compañía
- (Argentina) - Él Mató a un Policía Motorizado
- (Argentina) - El Kuelgue
- (United States) - Foster the People
- (Spain) - Ginebras
- (Mexico) - Happy-Fi
- (Spain) - Iseo & Dodosound
- (Spain) - Jarabe de Palo (homenaje a Pau Donés)
- (Mexico) - Jay de la Cueva
- (Guatemala) - Jesse Baez
- (Puerto Rico) - Kany García
- (United Kingdom) - Keane
- (Japan) - Kikuo
- (Argentina) - La Delio Valdez
- (Mexico) - La Lupita
- (Mexico) - La Santísima Voladora
- (Spain) - León Benavente
- (Mexico) - Little Jesus
- (Mexico) - Los Ángeles Azules
- (Mexico) - Los Concorde
- (Mexico) - Los Esquizitos
- (Mexico) - Los K'Comxtles
- (Spain) - Los Planetas
- (Colombia) - Lospetitfellas
- (Mexico) - Lucha Libre AAA Worldwide
- (Mexico) - Meme del Real
- (Mexico) - Macario Martínez
- (Mexico) - Midnight Generation
- (Spain) - Mikel Izal
- (Mexico) - Miki
- (Mexico) - Molotov
- (Chile) - Mon Laferte
- (Mexico) - Motel
- (Mexico) - Nortec Collective: Bostich + Fussible
- (Mexico) - Porter
- (Mexico) - Pressive
- (Mexico) - Robot95
- (Sweden) - Royal Republic
- (Australia) - Rüfüs Du Sol
- (Germany) - Scorpions
- (Brazil) - Sepultura
- (Mexico) - Siddhartha
- (Mexico) (Spain) (France) - The Guapos
- (Argentina) - Usted Señalemelo
- (Mexico) - Víctimas del Doctor Cerebro
- (Argentina) - Vilma Palma e Vampiros
- (Mexico) - Zoé

=== Changes, cancellations and surprise acts ===
- (Spain) - Raphael (Canceled)
- (Mexico) - Música pa' mandar a volar (Note: Daniela Romo, Yuri, José María Napoleón, María José, Leonardo de Lozanne, Saúl Hernández and Belinda Peregrín) (surprise act)

== See also ==
- Corona Capital
- Festival Ceremonia
