= Odisseo =

Mexican rock band

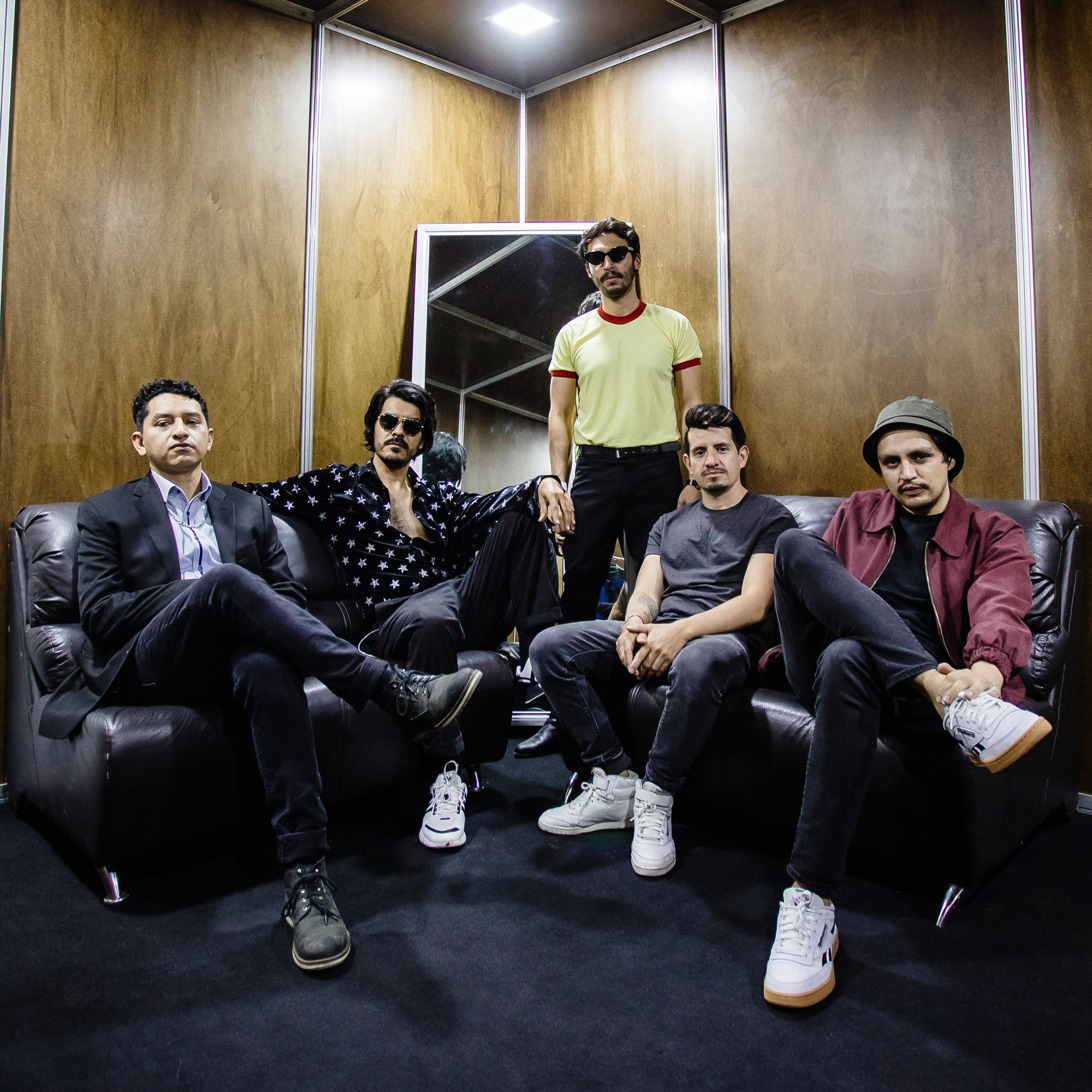

Background information
- Origin: Ecatepec, State of Mexico, Mexico
- Genres: New wave; Latin alternative; Alternative rock; Indie rock
- Years active: 2010–present
- Label: Sony Music Mexico
- Members: Juan Pablo López; Daniel León; Edgar Macin; Manuel Uribe; Rodolfo Guerrero
- Past members: Esteban González
- Website: https://odisseo.mx/

Odisseo is a Mexican alternative rock band. The band is composed of Juan Pablo López (vocals), Manuel Uribe (drums), Daniel León (guitar), Rodolfo Guerrero (keyboards), and Édgar Macín (bass).

== History ==
In their early days, their sound was influenced by Latin American romantic ballads from the 1970s and 1980s, British rock, and synth-pop from the same decades. Their main influences included José José, Roberto Carlos, The Style Council, Barry White, A Flock of Seagulls, The Strokes, The Killers, and The Smiths, among others. However, over the years, they have developed a distinct sound that has allowed them to stand out in the music scene in Mexico and Latin America. Odisseo's beginnings trace back to The Stupids Rock & Roll, an indie rock quartet that included Daniel León (guitar), Edgar Macin (bass), and Manuel Uribe (drums). When that project came to an end in 2010, Daniel, Edgar, and Manuel decided to continue making music together and invited Rodolfo Guerrero to refresh their sound with the addition of keyboards and synthesizers. Finally, Esteban González joined to provide vocals and contribute his songwriting. The band's name came from a suggestion by Manuel, who noted that the central themes in their lyrics were feelings of hate and desire, which led to the name "Odisseo." In 2011, a year after their formation, they released their debut EP “Los salvajes”, produced by Julián Navejas (of Enjambre). As part of the EP’s promotion, Odisseo joined the tour of Enjambre and Carla Morrison.

== Career ==
In 2012, the band independently released “Sí, Yo Soy”, their first full-length album, produced by Daniel Gutiérrez (of La Gusana Ciega). The album featured some of the group’s most important singles up to that point: “No,” “Barry,” “Sentimental,” and “Corazón de Acero.” Their first performances were free events in small bars and public venues, such as the Museo Universitario del Chopo (2012), the Centro Cultural Casa del Lago Juan José Arreola (2012), and Mexico City's San Lázaro Metro Station (2013), where, according to Civil Protection reports, they reached a record attendance of 3,500 people. Their audience quickly grew throughout Mexico and Latin America, and in 2013, they performed for the first time at the XIV edition of the Vive Latino Festival. That same year, they went on tour through Central America, visiting Guatemala, El Salvador, and Costa Rica. In 2013, they were also invited to contribute to the tribute album Un tributo a José José, where they performed the song “Seré,” and they ended the year with a sold-out show at the Lunario of the National Auditorium in Mexico City.

2014 was a very active year for the band, with performances at several festivals including RMX 212 in Guadalajara, their second consecutive appearance at Vive Latino, and the Semana de las Juventudes in Mexico City, where they played in front of more than 40,000 attendees. In May 2014, they returned to the Casa del Lago Juan José Arreola Cultural Center, setting a new attendance record of 5,000 people. That same year, Odisseo signed their first record deal with Universal Music and released the album “Días de Fuego”, produced by Julián Navejas. The album was quickly embraced by the public, entering the Top Ten in national sales at MixUp for three weeks following its release. The album featured the hits “Mentía,” “Las penas por amor,” and “Días de fuego”, which became the band's most representative song at the time and was written by Esteban González (former member). The song was later covered by Ases Falsos, Banda de Turistas, and Robota. The impact of “Días de Fuego” earned Odisseo a nomination at the 2014 MTV Millennial Awards in the Best New Artist category, as well as a sold-out show at the Teatro de la Ciudad in Mexico City. In 2015, they released the extended version of “Días de Fuego”, which included the previously unreleased tracks: “Juegos perdidos,” “Cuando el intento muere,” and “Juventud.” They also performed a sold-out show at Sala Corona and served as the opening act for Imagine Dragons at the Palacio de los Deportes in Mexico City.

After a negative experience with the music industry, Odisseo returned to working independently. In 2016, they released a three-track EP titled “Sensacional”, produced by Fernando Laura. During that time, internal tensions arose within the band, which would later lead to a change in their lineup. In January 2017, the group announced the departure of Esteban González (vocals), entering a brief hiatus that ended in August of the same year, when they introduced Juan López as the new lead vocalist of Odisseo. Juan, a friend of Daniel, had been part of “Los Fascinantes”, an indie band from Mexico City with whom Odisseo had previously shared the stage. After Juan joined, Odisseo released “Invencibles”, a single that introduced the band’s new sound. The song reached #2 on Spotify Mexico’s Most Viral Songs of 2017 during its first week of release.

== Discography ==
- Sí, Yo Soy (2012)
- Días De Fuego (2014)
- Cambio Estacional (2018)
- Generación Inmediata (2022)
- Tormentas Inesperadas (2024)
