= Dangerous Rhythm =

Dangerous Rhythm may refer to:

- Ritmo Peligroso, Mexican post-punk/rock band known as Dangerous Rhythm from 1978 to 1984
- Dangerous Rhythm Studios, a recording studio in Oakland, California
- Dangerous Rhythm, 1982 album by María Conchita Alonso
- "Dangerous Rhythm", 1976 Ultravox! single off the album Ultravox!
- "Dangerous Rhythm", 1984 Amii Stewart song off the album Try Love
