= Descartes a Kant =

Mexican rock band

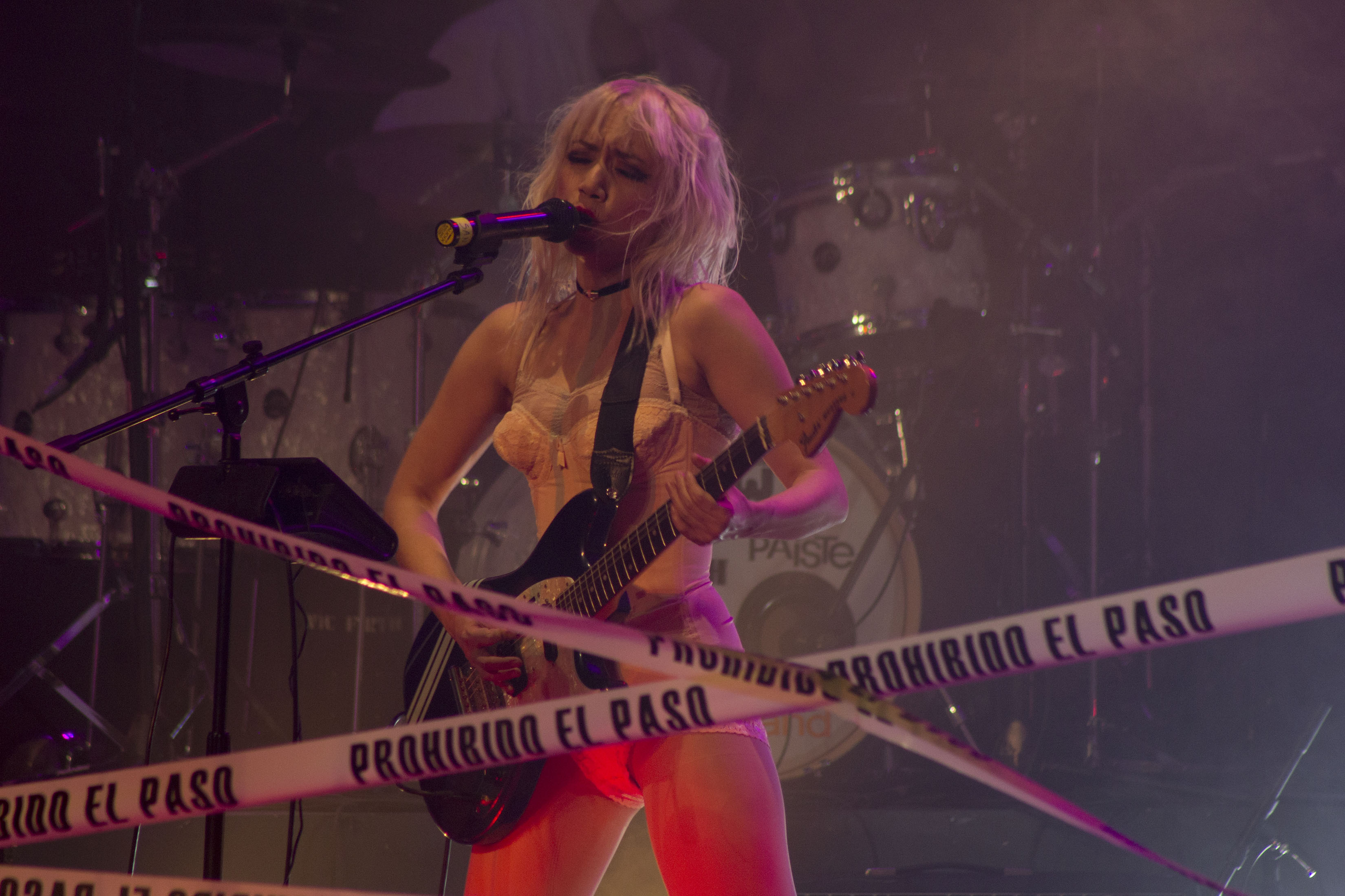
- Descartes a Kant in concert at Teatro de la Ciudad Esperanza Iris, Mexico City, 2017

Background information
- Origin: Guadalajara, Jalisco, Mexico
- Genres: Noise rock, punk rock, experimental rock
- Years active: 2001–present
- Label: Discos Intolerancia
- Members: Sandrushka Petrova; Ana Cristina Mo; Memo Ibarra; Leo Padua; The DAK
- Past members: Dafne Carballo; Andro Muñoz; Jorge Chávez; Frankie Mares; Charlovsky; Sol Rubí Gonzalez

Descartes a Kant is a Mexican rock group from Guadalajara, Jalisco. Formed in 2001, it is characterized by its musical style blending different musical rhythms and its performances.

== History ==
Founded by composer Sandrushka Petrova as a teenager in the early 2000s, Descartes a Kant formed in Guadalajara, Mexico originally as an all-female band, playing at parties on the local scene. They adopted the name from a philosophy book that contains a chapter titled "From Descartes to Kant" whose opposing philosophical works framed the beginning of the modern era, seeking to make analogy to the contrasts in musical style characteristic of the group in the beginning. In its early stages, their style was self-defined as a "bipolar-schizoid sound" by alternating sweet and melodic tonalities with dissonances and strident noises. Their work includes influences from noise rock, punk, surf, electronic music, new wave, and jazz. Their live performances are usually theatrical performances, and the group members usually wear specific outfits for this.

After spending a few years in the local underground and several changes in its lineup, Descartes a Kant released its first album, titled Paper Dolls (2007), with the independent Mexican label Discos Intolerancia.

In 2010 Frankie and Charlovsky left the project, and Jorge Chavez (Clondementto, Pito Pérez), Ana Cristina Moreno (Go Go Frenesí) and Memo Ibarra (Hong Kong Blood Opera) joined.

Their second album Il Visore Lunatique (2012) is a psychological-musical thriller. The album, inspired by madness and mental pathologies, aroused the attention of international media and people such as Mike Patton and Dave Lombardo towards the group. This album took them to international stages for the first time, with tours throughout Russia, South America, Europe, Central America and the United States.

Victims Of Love Propaganda (2017) is the band's third studio album and first album released by a North American label, recorded in Chicago by engineer Steve Albini. It is a concept album. This album was presented live as a 3-act concert (Teatro de la Ciudad in Mexico City and Teatro Diana in Guadalajara) in which they developed a multi-disciplinary essay on the concept of Western love and propaganda about happiness. This album takes them to perform in Mexico, Europe, the United States and South America, opening for artists such as Bauhaus, Cibo Matto and Dead Cross on their tour, and performing at festivals such as Roskilde, Iceland Airwaves, Youth Brigade, Ruido Fest, Rock al Parque, Cervantino, Vive Latino, Indio Emergente, Maquinaria Fest, SXSW, Culture Collide, White Nights, and Manizales Grita Rock y Quimera.

In Mexico, it played with Yeah Yeah Yeahs, Sonic Youth, Yo La Tengo, Stereo Total, El Otro Yo, Explosions in the Sky and The Melvins.

In April 2022, the group announced the departure of Dafne, Andro and Jorge, and in December of the same year they made their first presentation as a quartet. In May 2023 they announced the integration of Leo Padua (Los Viejos, Annapura) as drummer, as well as a machine called "The DAK", also considered a new member of the group. In 2023 they released their fourth studio album, After Destruction.

== Members ==
- Sandrushka Petrova (vocals, guitars, programming)
- Ana Cristina Mo (guitar, voice and synthesizer)
- Memo Ibarra (bass, synthesizer, voice and programming)
- Leo Padua (drums, sampler)

=== Former members ===
- Dafne Carballo (voice, guitar and violin)
- Andro Muñoz (piano, and synthesizer)
- Jorge Chávez (drums, percussions and samplers)
- Frankie Mares (drums)
- Charlovsky (bass)
- Sol Rubí Gonzalez (guitar and vocals)

== Discography ==
- 2007: Paper Dolls
- 2012: Il Visore Lunatique
- 2017: Victims Of Love Propaganda
- 2023: After Destruction

=== Others ===
- 2008: Gigantic: A Tribute to Kim Deal - "I Just Wanna Get Along"
- 2009: Juegos Inocentes Soundtrack - Juegos Inocentes (Single)
- 2017: Halloween Pussy Trap Kill! Kill! Soundtrack- Motion Picture Dream Boy
- 2019: Carol of the Bells
- 2019: Tricky Presents: False Idols; Test of Time- Crime Scene
- 2020: A Tribute to Lou Reed EP
