= Sonidero Nacional =

Mexican musical group

Sonidero Nacional is a Mexican musical collective from Monterrey, Nuevo León. They fuse different musical styles such as hip hop, reggae and electronica with the tropical rhythms of cumbia, vallenato, ska and afrobeat, thereby creating a new, more international form of cumbia. They are pioneers of the Avanzada Regia musical movement. They have performed at festivals such as the Vive Latino festival in Mexico City and the Festival Internacional de Puebla. One of their most well-known songs is a tribute that they did to the norteña group Bronco, called "Grande de Cadera", which was released on the tribute album Tributo al más grande alongside various other covers done by other famous Mexican groups.

They are also known for the remixes they have done of many popular songs such as Perfecta by Julieta Venegas and Miranda!.
