= Flor Amargo =

Mexican singer, musician and composer (born 1986)

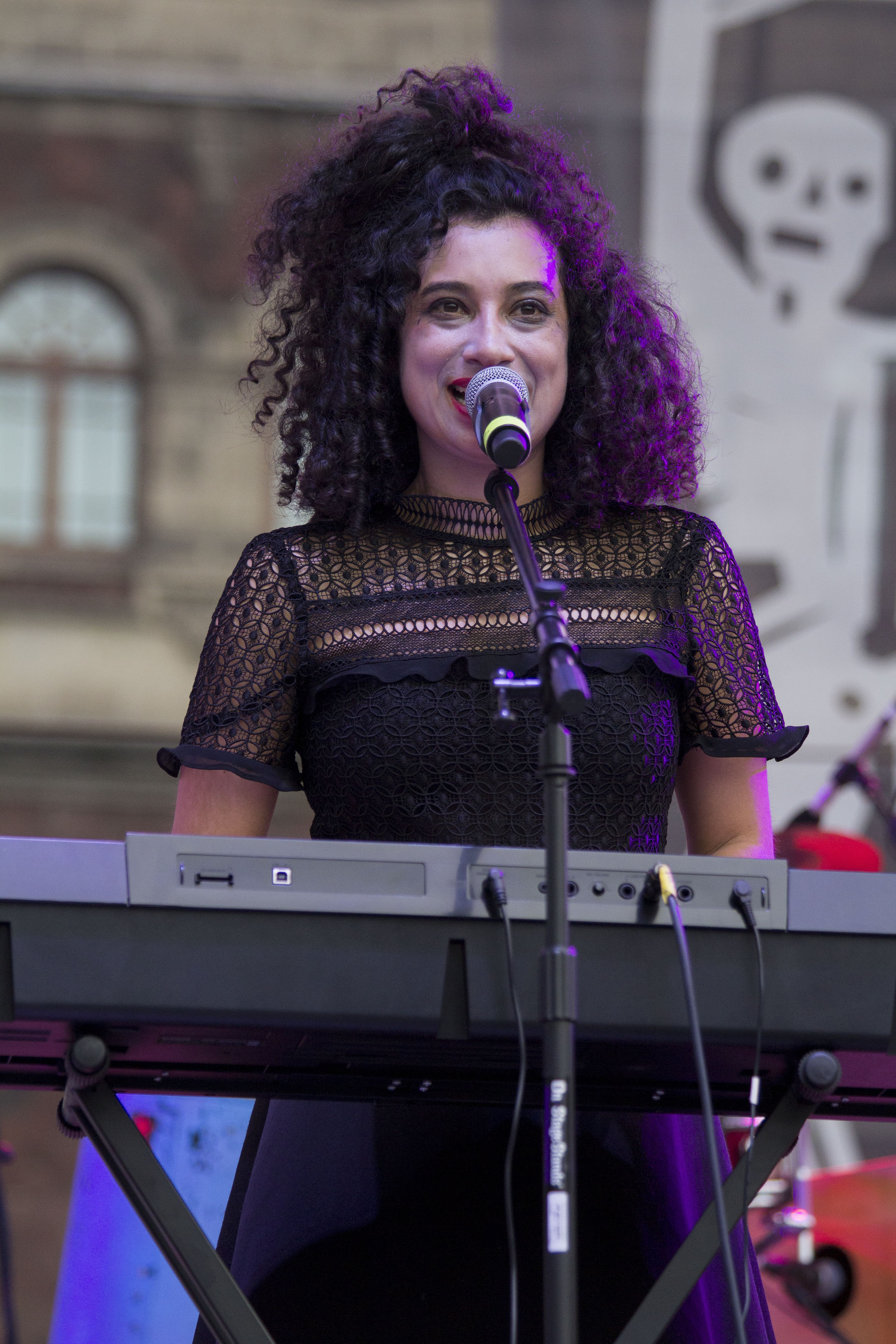

Background information
- Born: Emma Mayte Carballo Hernández; 25 February 1986 (age 40); Asunción Nochixtlán, Oaxaca, Mexico
- Genres: Alternative pop Corridos Binarios
- Occupations: Singer, musician, composer
- Instruments: Vocals, piano, guitar, accordion, percussion instruments
- Years active: 2010–present

Emma Mayte Carballo Hernández, best known as Flor Amargo, (born 25 February 1988) is a non-binary Mexican singer, multi-instrumentalist musician and composer. They began their career performing in the streets of Mexico City, which made them known on the internet for their talent and charisma. Amargo gave their music genre the name of Katartic pop, combining pop music, folk music, Mexican cumbia and piano.

Flor Amargo studied classical piano at the Conservatorio Nacional de Música in Mexico City, and then studied music in Italy. They participated twice in the singing competition La voz and performed at the Vive Latino music festival in March 2020.

On 1 December 2020, Flor Amargo came out as a lesbian and declared to be in a relationship with their manager Lolita. In December 2022, Amargo announced that they identified as non-binary and trans.

== Discography ==
=== Albums ===
- Carrusel (2010)
- Espejo Cristal (2016)
- Todos somos Flor Amargo (2017)
- Sin Maquillaje (2019)
- Tonantzin (2021)
