= Los Daniels =

Mexican rock band

Los Daniels is a Mexican rock band formed in May 2007. The band is formed currently by Enrique Jimenez (Lead Vocals), Charlie Palomares (Rythmic Guitar), Alfonso Díaz (bass guitar), René Lugo (lead guitar) and Rasheed Durán (drums).
Released their first album "Se renta cuarto para señoritas" (Room for rent - Only Ladies) in July 2007, under the label Iguana Records. Since then, Los Daniels have been presented at major festivals with impressive success as the Vive Latino '08 where about 90,000 people gathered, meeting at their anniversary day. They have been part of Corona Music. In 2009 they released their second album, entitled "Moodanza", an album that reflects maturity and reinforces its audience. They promote the album Universo Paraíso, during 2019. and in 2021 they released Serpientes y Escaleras which is their 7th studio album from the band. And they are currently working on a live album featuring their hits with the Oaxaca’s Camerata.

== Discography ==
=== Se renta cuarto para señoritas (2007) ===
Track listing

1. Te puedes matar - 3:08
2. Escaparme de aquí - 2:08
3. Hazme daño - 3:05
4. Fixión - 3:13
5. Lo que fuí ayer - 2:54
6. Dejemos que baile - 2:09
7. Cuando su reloj falló - 3:32
8. Todo se acabó - 3:39
9. No estaríamos aquí - 2:42

=== Moodanza (2009) ===
Charts #84 (MEX) #10 (MEX ROCK)
Track listing

1. Junto a mi - 2:29
2. En otra dimensión - 3:18
3. Sin luz - 3:16
4. Mooddanza - 3:26
5. Mientras caes - 3:18
6. Lejos - 2:48
7. Really sex - 2:54
8. Cuando esté contigo (coros de F. Curie Jetter) - 3:30
9. Al mas allá - 3:09
10. Solos - 3:00
11. El juego - 2:57
12. Contradicción - 2:51
13. Leal - 3:50
14. Todo se acabó - 3:39
15. Ficción (Electroacustic) (Bonus Track) - 3:24
16. Te puedes matar (Remix) (Bonus Track) - 4:06

=== A casa (2010) ===
Charts #41 (MEX) #3 (MEX ROCK)
Track listing

1. Cuentos
2. Sin documentos
3. Al más allá
4. A casa
5. Quisiera saber (Feat. Natalia Lafourcade)
6. Really sex
7. Se lo dejo al tiempo
8. Ficción
9. No lo puedes parar
10. En otra dimensión
11. Te puedes matar
12. Quién me salve
13. Ya no volverás
14. Vuelvo

=== Amanecer (2013) ===
Track listing

ROCK CABRÓN

1. Amanecer
2. Morena
3. Lágrimas
4. El viajante
5. La escalera
6. Tiro de gracia
7. En el mismo tren
8. Entre la hierba
9. El loco
10. Sabe mal (Feat. Pato Machete)
11. Te deseo lo mejor

=== Inmortal (2016) ===
Track listing

1. Ahora
2. Inmortal (En tí)
3. Hasta las cenizas (Feat. Lila Downs)
4. Desperté
5. Lo sabía
6. Perdóname
7. Mujer
8. Te seguiré
9. Oportunidad
10. 10. Sólo tú

=== Universo Paraíso (2018) ===
Track listing

1. Uno para el Otro
2. Dejarte Ir
3. Vendrás por Mi
4. La Niña de los Ojos Tristes
5. Suéltame (feat. Claudio Valenzuela)
6. Día con día
7. Culpables
8. Ya no sigas Corazón
9. Cuerpos Sin Control
10. Busca hacia Dentro
11. Solo Baila para Mi
12. Buscando canciones

=== Serpientes y Escaleras (2021) ===
Track listing

1. Circo
2. Quiero que me quieras
3. Desnúdate
4. Ya Basta!
5. Y Vuelvo a Existir (feat. Ely Guerra)
6. La Despedida
7. Déjame
8. Dragones
9. Cuestión de Tiempo
10. Fluir
