= Torreblanca (band) =

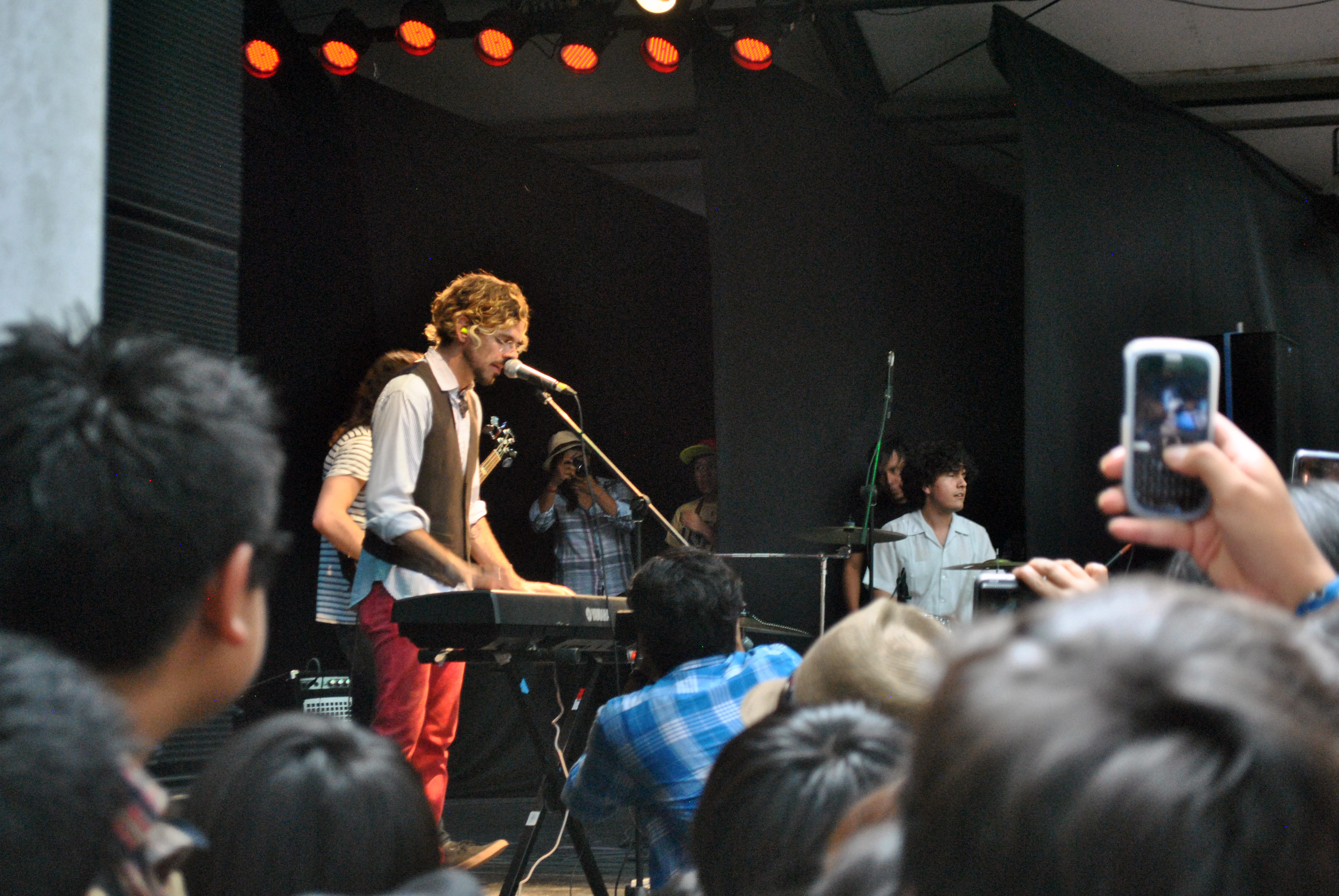
- Torreblanca live at Mexico City

Background information
- Origin: Mexico City, Mexico
- Genres: Alternative rock, pop rock
- Years active: 2007–present
- Labels: Arts and crafts Mexico
- Members: Juan Manuel Torreblanca; Alejandro Balderas “El Tío” Carlos Zavala “El Abuelo” Jerson Vázquez; Natalie Reyes

Torreblanca is a Mexican rock and pop band based in Mexico City led by musician and composer Juan Manuel Torreblanca.

== History ==
In 2007, Juan Manuel Torreblanca was selected by the Red Bull Music Academy to participate in forums and workshops in Toronto, Canada, where he also made several concerts. In 2008, Juan Manuel participated in the Sónar Festival. After the festival, he decided to form a band to make a new musical proposal. Through MySpace he met Alejandro Balderas, who plays the flute, saxophones, clarinet and the transverse flute. Also they invited Jerson Vázquez on the drums and Carlos Zavala "El Abuelo" on bass, with whom Juan Manuel had formed previously the group Un Teni.

The new band with the name Torreblanca, taken from the last name of Juan Manuel, published an EP, Defense, with four songs, co-produced by Arturo "Turra" Medina and León Polar, LoBlondo from Hello Seahorse! and Natalia Lafourcade. After listening to them at Vive Latino festival, Quique Rangel from Café Tacuba decided to be the producer of their first LP, Bella época.

In 2012 the song "Roma" was the theme of a Telcel ad campaign. In 2014 Torreblanca published another production, El polvo en la luz produced by Hector Castillo, receiving good reviews.

== Members ==
- Juan Manuel Torreblanca, piano, vocals
- Alejandro Balderas “El Tío”, flute, sax, clarinet and vocals
- Carlos Zavala “El Abuelo”, bass
- Jerson Vázquez, drums
- Natalie Reyes, accordion, synth, vocals

=== Past members ===
- Andrea Balency, accordion
- Carmen Ruíz, accordion, vocals

== Discography ==
=== Studio albums ===
- 2011: Bella Época
- 2014: El Polvo En La Luz
- 2016: Algo Se Quedó Sin Decir

=== EP ===
- 2010: Defensa.
