= La Internacional Sonora Balkanera =

Mexican band

- Origin: Mexico City, Mexico
- Genres: Balkan beat, world music, electronica
- Years active: 2008–present
- Label: Casete Upload
- Members: DJ Sultán; Chukupaka; Enrique Pérez; Mi+Mo; Pablo Ramírez; Mario Salas; Zabad Castro; Alfredo Vélez

La Internacional Sonora Balkanera is a Mexican electronic music, rock, world beat and balkan beat band that became known in 2011 after playing in big music events such as Glastonbury Festival, Vive Latino and Cumbre Tajín.

Their first album was produced by Roberto Mendoza “Panóptica”, one of the founding members of the Nortec Collective, and it won, alongside Paté de Fuá's third work, the award to best Jazz/Funk/Fusion Album released in 2011 at the Mexican Indie-O Music Awards.

La Internacional Sonora Balkanera formed in Mexico City in 2008, alongside the local Balkan beat scene, a movement inspired in the music and aesthetics of Eastern Europe; in the beginning, the band was formed by DJ Sultán, the guitar player Watty, and percussionist Chukupaka, and most of its repertoire were live remixes, with a few original tracks. Eventually a two clarinet players (Enrique Pérez y Pablo Ramírez) joined the band, as well as a second percussion player (Mario Salas) and a VJ (Mi+Mo). Since then they started creating original pieces and created a version of Panóptica's "Pico Selector", which woke the Tijuana musician's interest to produce the band. For their 2012 concert at the Feria Nacional de San Marcos, the band announced the entrance of a new guitar player, Zabad Castro. Since then, the band has performed throughout Mexico, as well as in London, Barcelona, and New York.

La Internacional Sonora Balkanera was signed in 2011 by LOV/RECS, a label directed by the legendary Canadian Hi-NRG artist Pascal Languirand, a.k.a. Trans-X, creator of the 1980s hit Living on Video.

In 2013 the band released their second album, "Balkanazo Tropical", under the Mexican indie label Casete Upload, founded and co-directed by Camilo Lara, creative head behind the Mexican Institute of Sound. This record was once again nominated as best Jazz/Funk/Fusion Album in the 2014 edition of the Mexican Indie-O Music Awards

== Discography ==
- Tan lejos de Sarajevo (demo, 2009)
- Live@MX 2010 (demo, 2010)
- La Internacional Sonora Balkanera (LOV/RECS, 2011)
- Balkanazo Tropical (Casete Upload, 2013)
- Etnopachanga Sound System (Casete Upload, 2016)

=== Collaborations ===
- "Pico Selector (Internacional Sonora Balkanera Version)" in Panoptica Orchestra (Special Edition) (LOV/RECS, 2011) by Panoptica Orchestra.
- "L.O.V. 2011 (Sonora Balkanera Living On Balkan Remix)" in L.O.V. 2011 EP Vol. 1 (LOV/RECS, 2011) by Trans-X.

== Awards ==
- 2012 Winner: Jazz/Funk/Fusion Album, Fifth Indie-O Music Awards for their debut album La Internacional Sonora Balkanera
- 2012 Nominee: Best New Artist, Fifth Indie-O Music Awards
- 2014 Nominee: Jazz/Funk/Fusion Album, Seventh Indie-O Music Awards for their second album Balkanazo Tropical
- 2014 Nominee: Best Mexican Band, UFI Awards (Spain) for their second album Balkanazo Tropical
