= Sabino (singer) =

Mexican musician (born 1987)

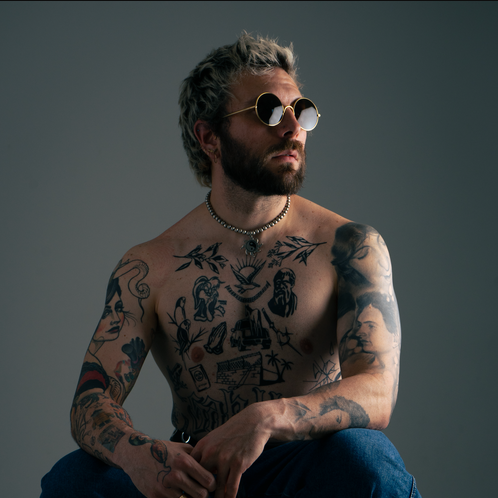

Background information
- Born: August 8, 1987 (age 39)
- Origin: Guadalajara, Jalisco, Mexico
- Genres: Hip-hop, Latin hip-hop, Pop rap
- Years active: 2010–present

Pablo Castañeda Amutio (born August 8, 1987), better known as Sabino, is a Mexican singer, songwriter, designer and rapper.

== Early life ==
The artist developed an interest in music from a young age, encouraged by his father, which led him to learn how to play the guitar and drums. He studied for a degree in design and worked at advertising agencies; however, he eventually decided to pursue a career in music.

== Career ==
He has collaborated with artists such as Natalia Lafourcade, Caloncho, Carla Morrison, among others. He draws inspiration from artists like Morat and Ed Maverick. In February 2025, he became the first Mexican rapper to gather 60,000 people at the GNP Stadium, where he shared the stage with artists such as Lng/SHT, Vanessa Zamora, Fer Casillas, and Bandalos Chinos, among others. Sab Hop is a genre invented by the artist, in which he combines hip-hop with pop influences and fragments of his personal life. It's a blend of rhythms that also incorporates reggae and rock influences. In addition, Sabino designated September as MISH: International Month of Sab Hop.

== Discography ==
- Yo quería hacer rock (2017)
- Genaro Presenta: Este No Es el Disco (2018)
- Yin (2019)
- Yang (2021)
- Fogateras (2022)
- Perder para Ganar (2023)
- GRAN (2024)
- Sabino: En Vivo Desde El Palacio De Los Deportes (2024)
