= Technicolor Fabrics =

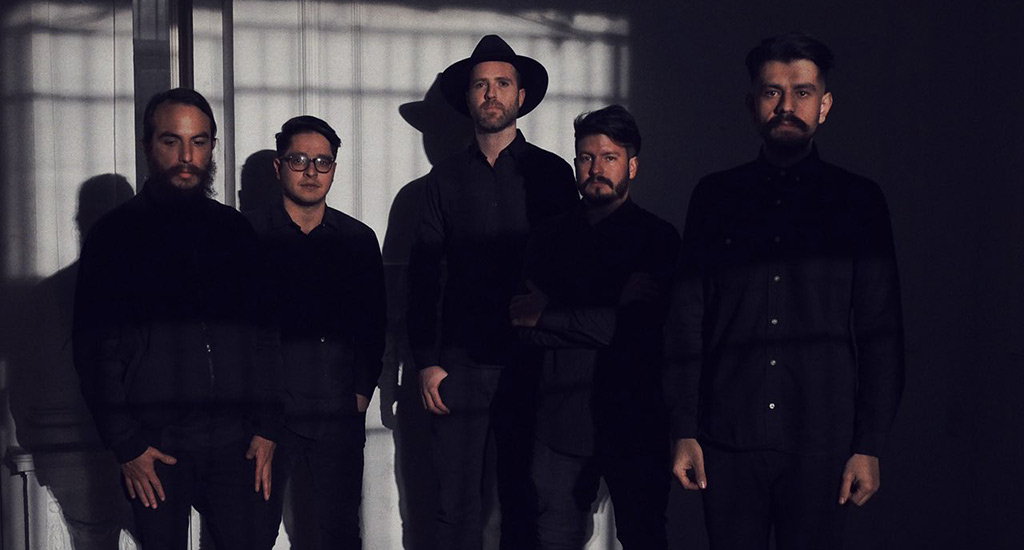

Technicolor Fabrics is a Mexican indie rock band founded in April 2007 in Guadalajara, Jalisco. It was originally formed by Juan Pablo Corcuera (vocalist/guitar), Abraham Lopez (drums), Raul Cabrera (guitar/bass/synth), and Joaquin Martinez (bass/guitar); but in 2009 Dan Salazar (keyboard) joined them. Since this band was founded, it has participated in concerts supporting bands such as The Whitest Boy Alive, Phoenix, Passion Pit and Capital Cities.

== History ==
Shortly after the band was founded, in 2008, the band participated as opening band for The Whitest Boy Alive, and thanks to this they gained the acceptance of the local media. Some months later they recorded their first demo, which became their first album Run… The sun is burning all your hopes, and it was produced by the musician Jorge Siddhartha Gonzalez.

The next year they met Dan Salazar while he was working on his project PONYREX, and he participated with Technicolor Fabrics as opening band for Phoenix, Whitest Boy Alive and Passion Pit. Immediately, the musician joined the band and he became a fundamental part of the creation of the songs on their second album Ideas, published in 2011.

In 2014, they participated in the music festival Vive Latino and in 2015 they published their album Bahia Santiago, which again was produced by Jorge Siddhartha, along with the Argentine Camilo Frodeival. "Avientame" is the first single from the album, whose video was filmed in Mexico City. "Fuma" is another single from this album; this song is a collaboration of Technicolor Fabrics and Siddhartha. Its video received 23,000+ views in less than 24 hours.

== Discography ==
=== Albums ===
- 2008: Run... The Sun Is Burning All Your Hopes
- 2011: Ideas
- 2015: Bahia Santiago
- 2019: Presente
