= Radaid =

Musical group from Guadalajara, Mexico

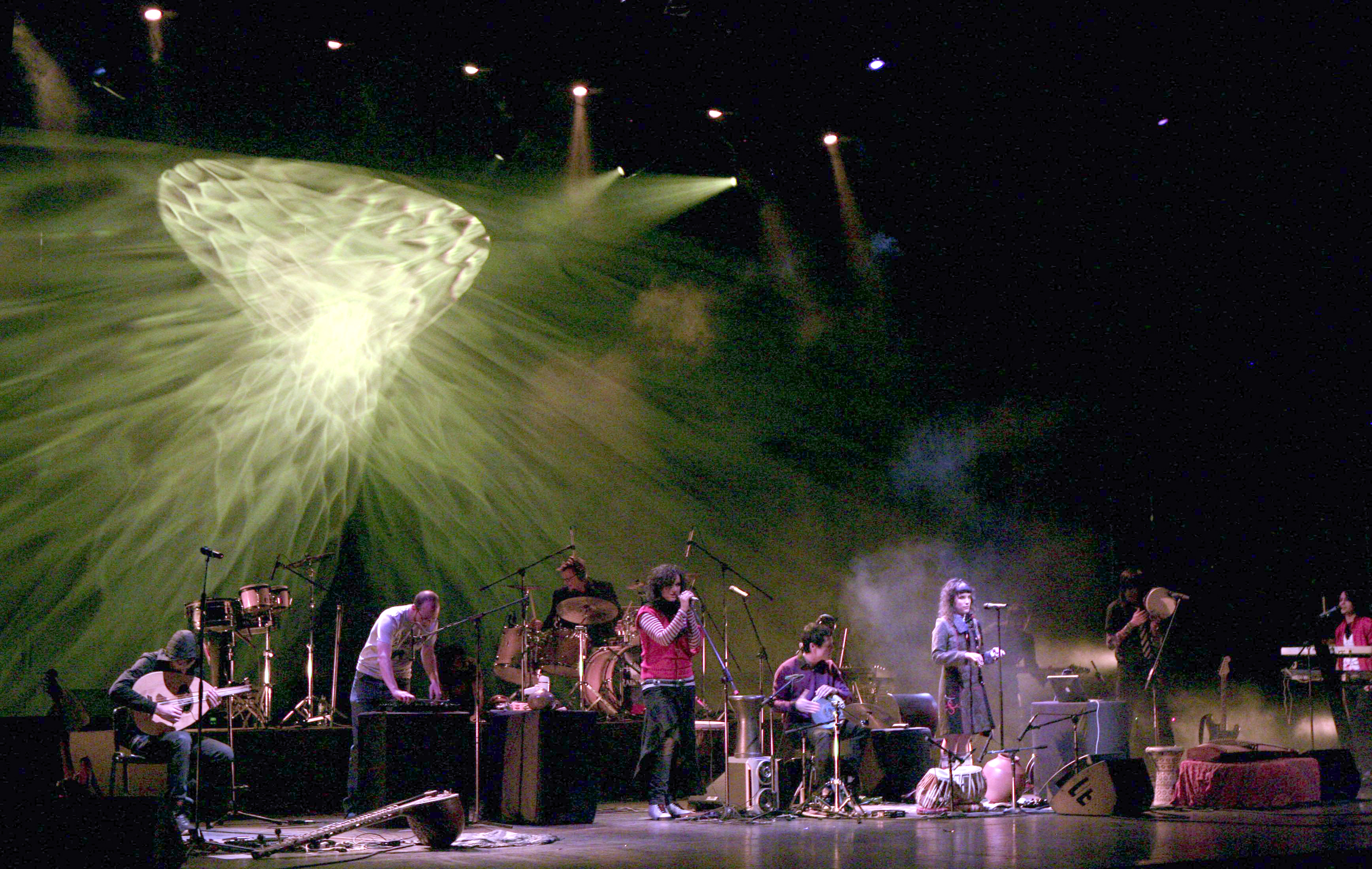
Radaid on stage in 2009.

Radaid is a musical group from Guadalajara, Mexico, which brings together pre-Hispanic sounds, world music, indie and contemporary electronic elements. The group, by Emmanuel Macías and Saúl Ledesma, was founded in 1998. Its main characteristic is the mix of music from all over the world with contemporary sounds, using both modern and traditional instrumentation. In the Arab-Egyptian language "radaid' means "son or protege of the sun".

== Biography ==
After experimenting with a Celtic musical scale, the base to unite sounds of diverse cultures, the project soon developed its own form and style, demanding stronger influences and composition. The band began with an acoustic guitar, a violin and a section of eclectic percussion, but became an octet mixing musical textures inclined to ritual spirituality with contemporary music.

Supported to a large extent by cultural institutions of Guadalajara and Mexico, Radaid was the first group of nonclassic music to play in the Degollado Theater in Guadalajara. The tours to promote their first two albums, Radaid and Luz escondida, have taken them all over Mexico and around the world.

They most recently performed at the Opening Ceremony of the 2011 Parapan American Games on November 12, 2011.

== Musicians ==
- Emmanuel Macias: Violin, keyboards, Erhu.
- Yadira Casillas: tinwisthle, flute, kalimba, kazoo, Percussion, choir.
- Diego Palma: voice, Guitar
- Jorge Bernal: Bass guitar.
- Angélica Cortés: Soprano voice, choir
- Gibrán Vázquez: Electric guitar, Guitar.
- Carlos López Borre: Drum kit.
- Iván Villegas: Darbouka, Djembe, Timpani.

== Discography ==
- Radaid, Independent (2002)
- Luz escondida, Independent (2006)
- L'Intent, Independent (2009)
- The willing, Independent (2012)
- Alkemia Independent (2018)

== Videos ==
- Live Degollado Theater (2004)
