= Troker =

Mexican psychedelic jazz band

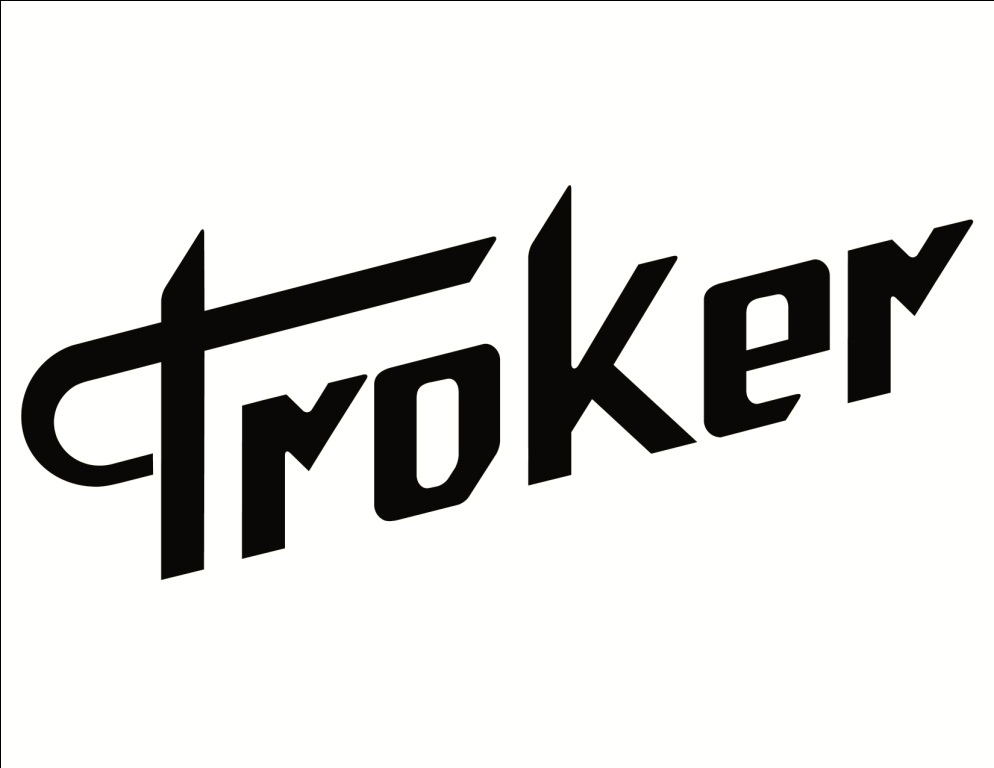

Background information
- Origin: Guadalajara, Jalisco
- Genres: Jazz, psychedelic music
- Years active: 2004–present
- Labels: Discos Intolerancia
- Members: Frankie Mares; Samo Gonzalez; Christian Jimenez; Chay Flores; Diego Franco; DJ Sonicko
- Website: troker.com.mx

Troker is a jazz and psychedelic music band from Guadalajara, Jalisco, Mexico.

DownBeat wrote that a 2013 concert performance showed that the band "presented a dynamic update of a sound that the Brecker Brothers started more than 35 years ago." Troker played the Jazzahead festival in Germany in 2015.

The line-up for a 2015 performance in New York was Christian Jiménez (keyboards), Gilberto Cervantes (trumpet), Arturo 'Tiburón' Santillanes (saxophone), Samo González (bass), Frankie Mares (drums), and DJ Zero (turntables). The New York City Jazz Record commented: "At one moment, you think Third-era Soft Machine has been resurrected, then that you've been transported to the Palladium Ballroom and suddenly you're in a '70s cop flick."

== Discography ==
- Jazz Vinil (2007)
- El Rey del Camino (2010)
- Pueblo de Brujos (2012)
- Crimen Sonoro (2014)
- 1919 Música para Cine (2016)
- Imperfecto (2018)
- Tierra y Libertad (Versión Mariachi) (2024)

== Members ==
- Christian Jimenez (keyboards)
- DJ Sonicko (turntables)
- Frankie Mares (drums)
- Isaias Flores (trumpet)
- Samo Gonzalez (double bass)
- Diego Franco (saxophone)

== Former members ==
- Tiburón Santillanes (saxophone)
- DJ Zero (turntables)
- Gil Cervantes (trumpet)
- DJ Rayo (turntables)
