= Disco Ruido =

Mexican electronic rock band

Disco Ruido is a Mexican electronic rock band formed in 2009.

== Early years (2006–07) ==
Disco Ruido was formed by producer Julian Placencia with fellow DJs and friends. The band started performing live shows in a similar way a DJ set is made, performing only in night clubs and other social events, and quickly gaining recognition in the electronic scene in Mexico City. The live band consisted of guest vocalists that helped performing the band's remixes to other artists. In April 2009, the band released "Mrs. Love", a song based on samples from The Beatles' "You Know My Name (Look Up The Number)". The song was released through a campaign called "Love Revolution" which made Disco Ruido the first Mexican band to top The Hype Machine's popularity chart. The song quickly gained controversy and a wide radio airplay becoming the band's first major success. Mexican radio station Reactor 105 listed the song as #4 on their "Best Of 2009" list.

== Sistema Solar (2010) ==
In April 2010, Disco Ruido started work on their first album, Sistema Solar (Solar System) The album comprises a collection of songs written with frequent on-stage collaborator Mercedes Nasta. The record's main concept is the metaphor between love and the gravitational pull of celestial bodies, and focuses around themes like, nature, the cosmos, ancient cultures, and their relationship with modern-age ideas of fear, love and psychosis.

== Vox Humana (2013) ==
During the recording sessions for their second album, Disco Ruido started Vox Humana, a side project that focuses on more dance and club oriented tracks with a much more simple approach in production. The name Vox Humana references the signature preset of the Polymoog synthesizer, which was widely used by electronic rock icon, Gary Numan, who Disco ruido often cite as a big influence on their style and music. The project unveiled a club tour around Mexico, Costa Rica and some United States cities. Recording sessions for the project resulted in two EPs that showed a more instrumental side of the band.

== Discography ==
Name	Year	Type
Mrs. Love	2009	Single
Sistema Solar	2010	LP
Vox Humana EP	2012	EP
Vox Humana EP II	2014	EP
RADIOFUTURA	2014	LP

== Remixes ==
1. Replica - Truth (More Cowbell Remix by Disco Ruido)
2. Fatalist - Arizona (Disco Ruido Remix)
3. Molotov - DDT (Disco Ruido D-D-Dance Mix)
4. Zoé - Neanderthal (Disco Ruido Remix)
5. Quiero Club - Fifty One (Remix by Disco Ruido)
6. She's A Tease - Datos Íntimos (Disco Ruido Club Mix)
7. Rey Pila - No.114 (Disco Ruido Yu-Remix)
8. Quiero Club - Qué Hacer en Caso de Oír Voces (Disco Ruido Remix)
9. Abominables - Diamantes (Disco Ruido Club Mix)
10. Dapuntobeat - :0 (Disco Ruido Club Mix)
11. Kinky - Dia Negro (Disco Ruido Remix)
12. El Columpio Asesino - Toro (Disco Ruido Club Mix)
13. Banda de Turistas - Decepciones (Disco Ruido Radio Mix)
14. LeBaron - Piel (Disco Ruido Dub Mix)
15. Chikita Violenta - Fáciles (Disco Ruido Remix)
16. Zoé - Game Over Shanghai (Disco Ruido Remix)

== Project members ==
- Julian Placencia (Drums, Percussion, Programming)
- Nariño tierno (Keyboards)
- Ale Moreno Dulché (Vocals)
- Mercedes Nasta (Vocals)
- Mauricio García (Guitar)
