= We Are the Grand =

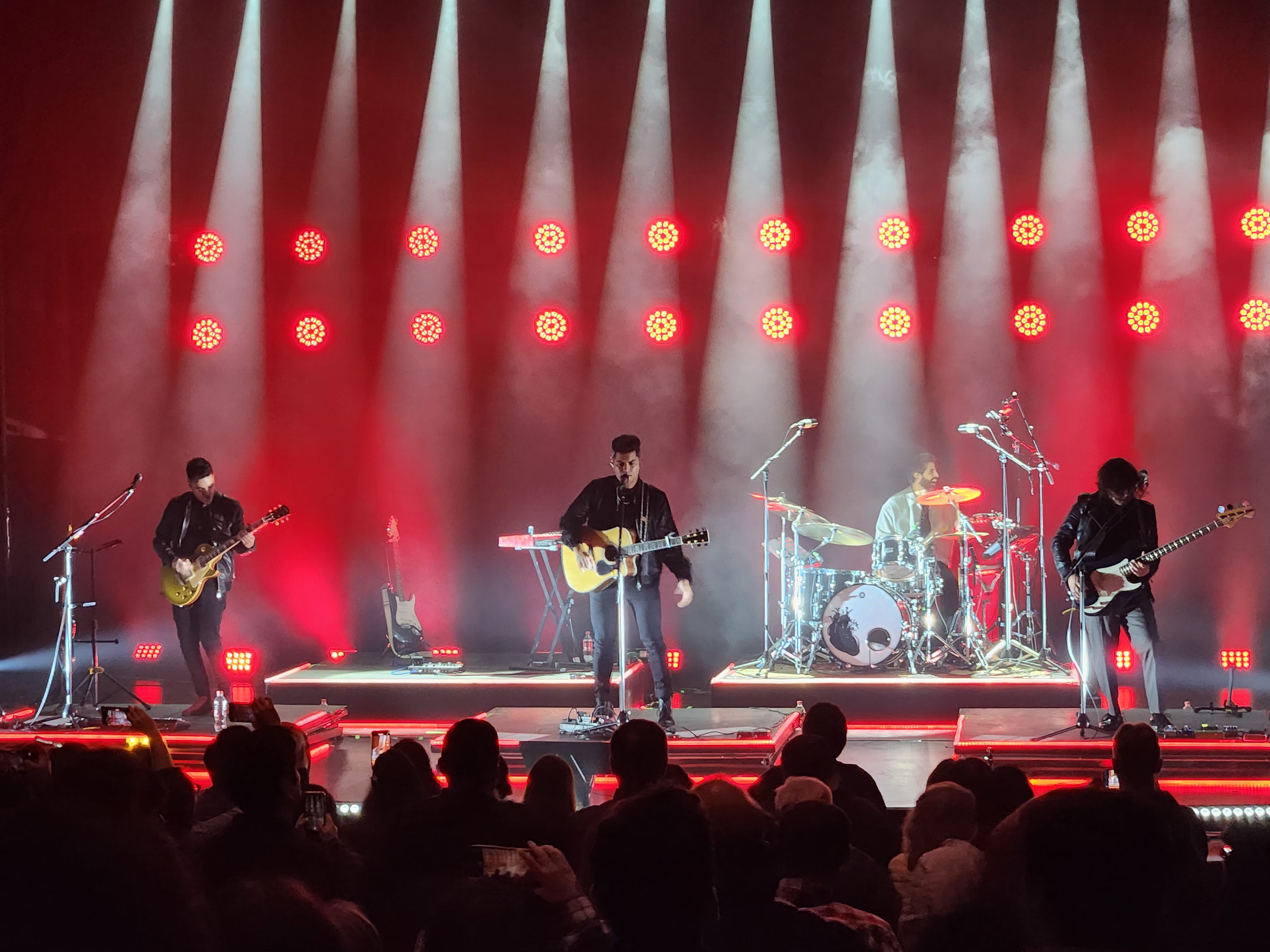
- We Are the Grand performing in 2024.

Background information
- Origin: Santiago, Chile
- Genres: Indie rock, new wave
- Years active: 2009–present
- Labels: Independent
- Members: Sebastián Gallardo; Matías Peralta; Juan Aguirre; Fernando Lamas
- Website: www.wearethegrand.com

We Are The Grand is a Chilean band and indie rock musical quartet. The group was formed in 2009 by Sebastián Gallardo (vocalist, guitar), Fernando Lamas (guitar), Benjamín Galdames (bass) and Matías Peralta (drums) in Santiago, Chile.

== History ==
The band was originally called "The Grand", but it changed after learning of a Norwegian band with the same name.

The group's music style is heavily influenced by indie rock of the 90s, and sounds similar to groups such as The Libertines, Franz Ferdinand, and Kasabian. They received positive reviews for the singles "Save Me", "Faint", "Ecstasy", "I Am" and "Do You Remember the First Time?".

Their first studio album released in 2012 was titled Until the Morning, and later released EPs in 2009 and 2010, titled The Grand and Chasing Lights, respectively.

The second studio album, Volver, was released on March 8, 2016. It was initially released as a free download for 24 hours. An official album release show took place a month later at Teatro Nescafe De Las Artes.

== Band members ==
=== Current members ===
- Sebastián Gallardo – vocal, guitar
- Fernando Lamas – guitar
- Sebastián Lira – bass
- Benjamín Galdames – drum

== Discography ==
Studio albums

- Until the Morning (2012)
- Volver (2016)
- Raíz (2018)
- Corazón Negro (2024)

EPs

- The Grand (2009)
- Chasing Lights (2010)
