= Los Dynamite =

Mexican indie rock band

- Origin: Mexico City, Mexico
- Genres: Indie rock, dance-punk, post-punk revival
- Years active: 2002–2008; 2022–present
- Labels: Noiselab
- Members: Diego Solórzano; Miguel Hernández; Eduardo Pacheco; Felipe Botello

Los Dynamite are a Mexican indie rock band based in Mexico City. Most of their songs are written in English.

The band is made up of Diego Solorzano (vocals, guitar), Miguel Angel Bribiesca (bass) and Eduardo Pacheco (drums) and previously Felipe Botello (guitar).

They met first at INHUMYC (a high school placed in the district of Tlalpan, in Mexico City) and started playing together, helped by Paco Huidobro. The band became famous when their song TV was used in a commercial of the cellphone company Telcel through summer of 2005. Their influences include The Velvet Underground, The Clash, Pixies, New Order, Joy Division, Depeche Mode, Interpol and The Strokes. The band mixes rock with techno and punk.

They opened the concerts of Interpol and played at festivals like Creamfields. They have shared the stages with artists like The Secret Machines, Bloc Party, The Kills, The Stills, Dirty Pretty Things, Incubus, The Juan Mclean and The Faint.

Their songs TV and Katatonic placed in the charts of Mexican alternative stations like Reactor 105.7 and Ibero 90.9 as best singles of the year, and Mexican Rolling Stone placed them as the most promising Mexican bands. They released their first album, Greatest Hits (released through Noiselabs and produced by Paco Huidobro), in 2006, with the tracks: TV, Frenzy, Pleasure, Smile, Ready Ready, Hold On, I'm 32, No Me Sueltes, 24, Katatonic, Visions with their first video 'Ready Ready' directed by Pablo Dávila.
