= Enjambre =

Mexican indie rock band

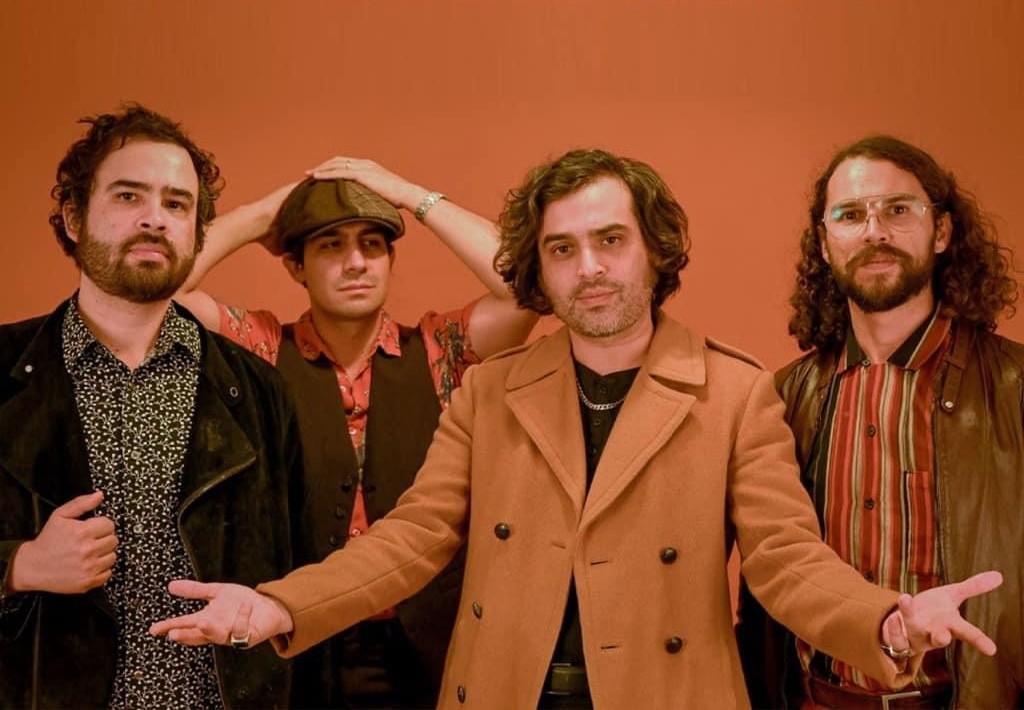

Background information
- Origin: Fresnillo, Zacatecas, Mexico
- Genres: Indie rock; pop rock; alternative rock; Latin alternative
- Years active: 2001–present
- Label: Universal Music México
- Members: Luis Humberto Navejas; Rafael Navejas; Julián Navejas; Ángel Sánchez; Isaac Navejas
- Past members: Javier Mejía; Osamu Nishitani; Nicolás Saavedra; Romeo Navejas
- Website: https://www.enjambremusica.com/

Enjambre is a Mexican indie rock band. It is composed of brothers Luis Humberto (lead vocals), Rafael (bass), and Julián Navejas (keyboards, guitar), their cousin Isaac Navejas (guitar), and Ángel Sánchez (drums). Enjambre started in Fresnillo, Zacatecas, consolidated as a group in Santa Ana, California, and later continued developing in Fresnillo, Zacatecas, starting professional recordings in 2005.

== History ==
In 1994, Luis Humberto, Rafael, and César Sánchez created a group called Los Cuatro Fantásticos in Fresnillo. Years later, after emigrating to the United States, they had to abandon the project, but once settled in California, they formed Enjambre in 2001 alongside their cousin Romeo Navejas. However, he would remain in the band for just over a year. The name Enjambre (which means "swarm") refers to a group of bees and is derived from the members’ surname: Navejas.

== Career ==
They have recorded eight studio albums and they also have two EPs: Ambrosía (2021) and Torna noches de salón (2024). Among their most popular songs are: “Vida en el espejo,” “Dulce soledad,” “Visita,” “Tercer tipo,” “Manía cardíaca,” “Somos ajenos,” “Elemento,” “Divergencia,” “Cámara de faltas,” “Sábado perpetuo,” and “Impacto.” Albums like Daltónico and Proaño were certified double gold and double platinum, respectively, while Los huéspedes del orbe received a platinum certification from the Mexican Association of Producers of Phonograms and Videograms (AMPROFON). They have won three Indie-O Music Awards, including New Producer of the Year in 2010 for El segundo es felino (awarded to Julián Navejas), and the following year, they won Band of the Year and the People's Choice Award. They also won a Premio Telehit for Best Alternative Band in 2011. Additionally, they have received several nominations, including:

- MTV Europe Music Awards for Best Northern Latin American Artist (2015)
- Premios Lo Nuestro for Best Album of the Year (Consuelo en domingo), Artist of the Year, and Song of the Year (“Biografía”).

In 2022, the Mexican Senate awarded them a recognition for their musical career, and in 2024, the State Congress of Zacatecas named them Cultural Ambassadors of the state. They have collaborated with artists such as Girls Go Ska, Estelares, Lo Blondo, and No Te Va Gustar. Additionally, they have performed at major music festivals such as Vive Latino in Mexico City and Spain, and Pa’l Norte in Monterrey.

== Band members ==
=== Current members ===
- Luis Humberto Navejas – lead vocals (2001–Present)
- Rafael Navejas – bass guitar, backing vocals (2001–Present)
- Julián Navejas – keyboards, guitars, backing vocals (2007–Present)
- Ángel Sánchez – drums, percussion (2007–Present)
- Isaac Navejas – guitars (2023–Present)

=== Former members ===
- Romeo Navejas – drums, percussion (2001–2002)
- Osamu Nishitani – guitars (2002–2006)
- Nicolás Saavedra – drums, percussion (2002–2006)
- Javier Mejía – guitars, backing vocals (2007–2021)

=== Touring members ===
- Roger Dávila – guitars (2023–2024)

== Discography ==
- Consuelo en domingo (2005)
- El segundo es felino (2008)
- Daltónico (2010)
- Los huéspedes del orbe (2012)
- Proaño (2014)
- Imperfecto extraño (2017)
- Próximos prójimos (2020)
- Noches de salón (2023)
- Daños luz (2026)
