= Antidoping =

Mexican reggae band

Antidoping is a Mexican reggae band formed in the summer of 1992 in Mexico City. They fuse roots reggae, ska and Caribbean rhythms with an urban flavour.

== Background ==
The band was formed in 1992, by Pedro and Manuel Apodaca, they started their career in the town of Coyoacán. Antidoping has been an active member of the Razteca reggae movement in Mexico, sharing the stage with many different artists, including Israel Vibrations, Alpha Blondy the Skatalies and many other important reggae and ska bands. They have toured Europe and across North America.

=== Line-up (2023) ===
- Adalid Andaluz - Bass (Bajo)
- Pedro Apodaca - Drums (Bateria)
- Kenji Fukushima - Guitar (Guitarra)/Backing vocals
- Manuel Apodaca - Keyboard (Teclados)/ Backing vocals
- Pepe Grela - Vocals
- Diego Alcazar - Percussion
- Juan Pablo Martínez - Keyboard (Teclados)
- Rogelio Ortiz - Tenor Saxophone (Saxofon)
- Edgar Castañón - Trombone
- Gustavo Quijada - Trumpet

== Discography ==
=== Búscalo ===
Find it

1. "Ardiendub"
2. "Aqui Jah"
3. "Vengan"
4. "A la vuelta de la esquina"
5. "Los ninos de jah"
6. "Sangre de fuego"
7. "La noche cayo en el barrio"
8. "La solucion"
9. "Jamsvy"
10. "Mandela"
11. "Como hacer saber el camino"
12. "Sotano"
13. "Mandela Dub"

=== Un lustro inyectando ruido positivo (BMG ARIOLA) ===
5 years injecting positive noise

[Recorded live in Mexico in 1999]

1. "Mar"
2. "Planeta"
3. "Roots, Rock, Reggae"
4. "Dub"
5. "New Generation"
6. "Sr. K."
7. "Vida"
8. "Frack De Costal"
9. "Creador"
10. "Juego A Muerte"
11. "Summer Time"
12. "Lola"

=== Antidoping en San Cris ===
Antidoping at San Cris

1. "Whatta Life"
2. "Chachaska/Como Hacer Saber"
3. "La Noche"
4. "Rudy (A Message To You)"
5. "A La Vuelta De La Esquina"
6. "Juego A Muerte"
7. "Faya DUB"
8. "You Better Cool"
9. "Ini"
10. "Roots Rock Reggae"
11. "Summertime"
12. "Lola"

=== Esfuerzo Universal ===
Universal Effort

1. "Whatta Life"
2. "Medicina"
3. "Esfuerzo Universal"
4. "Pipiltin"
5. "Sal a Caminar"
6. "Unidos Hermanos"
7. "InI"
8. "Faya DUB"
9. "Lejos de Casa"
10. "Calabaza"
11. "La Mentira"
12. "Equinox"
13. "You Better Cool"
