= Sueña Lindo, Corazón =

2025 single by Macario Martínez

Single by Macario Martínez
- Released: 10 January 2025
- Genre: Folk pop
- Length: 2:02
- Label: Casa del Árbol
- Songwriter: Macario Eli Martínez Jiménez
- Producer: Emmanuel Esquivel Ayala

Macario Martínez singles chronology
"En el Mismo Lugar" (2020)	"Sueña Lindo, Corazón" / "Nuestra Casa en el Mar" (2025)	"Si te Mentí" (2025)

Music video
- "Sueña Lindo, Corazón" on YouTube

"Sueña Lindo, Corazón" (transl. Dream cute, heart) is a song by Mexican singer Macario Martínez, released on 10 January 2025 alongside his song "Nuestra Casa en el Mar" as a two-track single. It became his breakout hit after going viral on the video-sharing app TikTok.

== Background and promotion ==
Macario Martínez wrote the song to a special person in his life. He was inspired by their nightly phone conversations, during which he always said "Sueña lindo, corazón" before saying goodbye. During one of their conversations, he started humming the phrase, after which he silenced the call, picked up the guitar and developed a melody. It was four in the morning when he started working on the song.

On January 27, 2025, Martínez posted a video on TikTok depicting his job as a street sweeper in Mexico City, with the song as the soundtrack. The video, which shows him in his work uniform and singing the song while touring the city in the back of a truck, catapulted him into overnight popularity. In addition to increasing his monthly listeners on Spotify from 2,622 to 440,560, it inspired similar videos on TikTok (with the theme of working class individuals following their dreams to pursue music) and gained attention from pop stars including singer Danna, who showed full support. In February 2025, Los 40 invited Martínez into the studio to hear his song on the radio for the first time, and he was moved to tears.

== Composition ==
The song is backed by acoustic guitar strums, over which Macario Martínez expresses wide range of emotions, such as melancholy, warmth and excitement. The lyrics focus on his desire for clarity in an uncertain relationship and to make his partner happy, but without knowing if his efforts are valued or his feelings are reciprocated. In addition, Martínez reflects on his internal struggle of letting go, accepting his pain and allowing it to gradually heal on its own.

== Music video ==
An official music video was released on 25 April 2025. It sees Martínez performing the song with his guitar in different parts of Veracruz.
