= La Castañeda =

La Castañeda is a Mexican rock group originally from Mexico City, formed in 1989 by Salvador Moreno, Edmundo Ortega, Alberto Rosas, Omar D'León, Oswaldo D'León y Juan Blendl.

== Discography ==
- Servicios Generales (1989)
- Servicios Generales II (1992)
- Globo Negro (1994)
- El Hilo de Plata (1996)
- Trance (1999)
- Galería Acústica (2004)
- Llama Doble (2006)
- La otra llama (2010)
