= Pito Pérez =

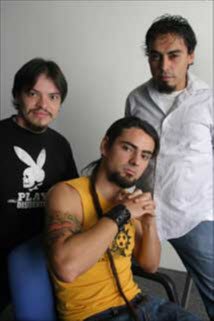
Pito Pérez - Miguel Méndez, Abraham Bustos and Jorge Chávez

Pito Pérez is a Mexican rock band originally from Guadalajara, Mexico.

The band began in the year 2000 in the city of Guadalajara. Miguel Mendez (Guitar and Vocals), Abraham Bustos (Bass and Vocals) and Jorge Chavez (Drums) got together to make music after playing in bands like Gong and Palida Fonk. The name Pito Perez was taken from the character of a famous novel called The futile life of Pito Perez La vida inútil de Pito Pérez, a book written in the 1930s by Mexican writer José Rúben Romero. The band wanted a very identifiable and Mexican name.

== Discography ==
=== Con Más Poder (2002) ===
Con Más Poder, Pito Perez's debut album, was recorded in January 2002 at Sonic Ranch and Leboot studios in Tornillo, Texas and Los Angeles. Produced by Jesus Chuy Flores, Con Más Poder contains 12 tracks in which you can hear the diverse sound style of the band, mostly regarded as a Power Trio/Power Ballad in their early beginnings. The singles 5 o 6, Lupita and Globo were promoted on video channels such as MTV and Telehit. Pito Perez started a tour in support of the album in capital cities of Mexico and Colombia. They played festivals such as: Musica por la Tierra, Vive Latino, El Tortazo Festival (Bogota Colombia) and Slam Fest. They have played with bands like: Maná, Red Hot Chili Peppers, Jaguares, El Tri, Molotov, Maldita Vecindad, Jumbo, and Kinky.

=== Tal y Cuál (2004) ===
Pito Perez returned to the studio in the year 2004 to record their second album Tal y Cual. Produced by Alex Gonzalez, drummer of the Mexican band Maná, during the months of February, March and April in Los Angeles. It was recorded at Conway Studios. The album contains 13 tracks that are more powerful and melodic and have more introspective lyrics than their previous work. They chose the name Tal y Cual for the CD because it was the best representation of the sound of the band: "Tal y Cual" means "as the band is". Tal y Cual hit the stores in October 2004 under the Warner music label. The first single was Huarache Skate. The song's video was recorded in the city of Guadalajara.

The band started touring in support of the new album throughout the country and played their first U.S. gig in Los Angeles at Chido Fest, a tour headlined by the Mexican band El Tri. After this came appearances with bands like Cafe Tacuba and Green Day in Dec/2004. They also played the Santo Desmind Festival in Puerto Vallarta. The second single of the band, Locamente, hit the radio while the band closed the tour during the months of October and November 2005 through Mexico City, at a national battle of the bands contest: "Tour Play Rush".

=== Breakup and return ===
In September 2006 Pito Perez disbanded, meanwhile their members would continue to explore other musical projects until 2010 when the band announced through their official Facebook page that they have reunited and will start playing again since November that same year.

== Other facts ==
In 2001 they won the Hard Rock Stage contest which included a record deal and US$10,000 as part of the prize.

== Equipment ==
(Pito Perez uses: Dw Drums, Pedals and Hardware, Pacific Drums and Hardware, Paiste Cymbals, Vic Firth Sticks, San Dimas Guitars and DR Strings)

== Other links and external references ==
Last.fm

sputnikmusic.com

Official Facebook Page

Itunes Discography

== Links in other languages ==
musica.com

rockmx.com

buenamusica.com
