= Vanessa Zamora =

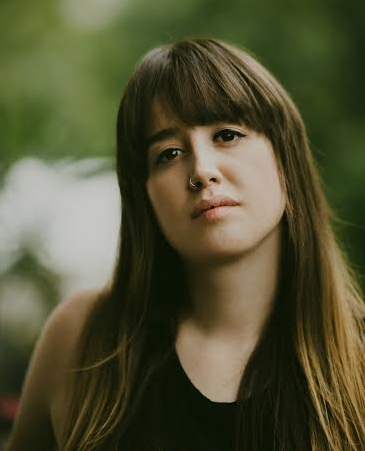

Background information
- Also known as: Damaleona
- Born: Vanessa Zamora Ramírez; July 22, 1991 (age 34); Tijuana, México
- Origin: Tijuana
- Genres: Indie Pop; Latin Indie; Alternative pop
- Occupations: Singer-songwriter, producer, performer
- Instruments: Guitar, piano, bass, drums
- Years active: 2014 – present
- Labels: Independent music
- Website: Official website

Vanessa Zamora Ramírez (born July 22, 1991) is a Mexican/American singer, songwriter, and producer. She fluently speaks English and Spanish. Zamora plays several instruments, including acoustic guitar, piano, keyboard, and drums.

== Biography ==
Vanessa Zamora was born in Tijuana, Baja California, on July 22, 1991. Her parents were pianists, and at an early age, she showed interest in the classic arts, learning guitar, drums, acting, ballet, and modeling. She started attending classes at age eight at Academia de Música de Mexico, acquiring instruction in piano; she was instructed in guitar and drums at age nine.

She continued with her music as a hobby until she was eighteen, attending Universidad Autónoma de Guadalajara. At that time, she publicly started sharing her music; she began doing video covers of various artists, uploading them on YouTube and other social networking sites. She was known for the habit of writing whatever she thought, lived or felt in notebooks, which she described as "brain drain.

In 2012, she finished her first EP, Correr, and later in 2012 No Sabes. She graduated in communication sciences in 2013 as an honor student. In 2014 she released her first album, Hasta la fantasía. In 2015 she released the single "Control".

== Discography ==
=== Albums ===
- DAMALEONA (2023)
- Tornaluna (2018)
- Hasta La Fantasía (2014)

=== Singles ===
- "Correr" (2012)
- "No sabes" (2012)
- "Te quiero olvidar" (2014)
- "Control" (2015)
