= Ritmo Peligroso =

Mexican post-punk/rock band

- Origin: Mexico City
- Genres: Punk rock, Post-punkLatín Rock
- Years active: 1978-present
- Labels: Comrock, WEA Polygram, Discos Orfeón, Universal Music.
- Members: Piro Pendas; Avi Michel J.; Mosy Bit; Jorge "Gato" Arce; Oscar Contreras Jr; Manny Murillo
- Past members: Eduardo “Mongoose” Avila.; Fernando Nava; Diego García; Pablo Rascón; Jorge Bautista; Rafael Espinosa; Armando Pinaca; Marcelo Aramburu; Johnny Danger/Cable (Paco Méndez); Cándido Neria; Carlos Warman
- Website: www.ritmopeligroso.com

Ritmo Peligroso is a Mexican post-punk/rock band that was created in 1978 and known until 1985 as Dangerous Rhythm.

Under that name, they created the first Mexican punk rock band, with strong influences from international punk subcultures. They sang most of their music in English. They would evolve to different sounds over the years, finally reaching the one that would bring them such enormous success in the mid to late 1980s.

In the new incarnation of the band in 1998, bassist Avi Michel Jr., drummer Jorge Gato Arce, and guitar players Moongus Ávila Costa and Mosy (the newest member of the band) that joined these band in 2012, share the stage with Mexican/Cuban singer Piro Pendas. His style has come to be considered punk rock and New Wave. The band released a compilation disk on the Comrock label, promoted in Mexico to make commercial rock in Mexico more accessible there. It included two Ritmo Peligroso songs: Marielito, about the arrival of a Cuban in the Mariel boatlift, and Modern Minds.

Later, known by then as Ritmo Peligroso, the group changed its style to incorporate elements of Latin rock and Latin rhythms, in a self-titled album which gave them their two big releases: Déjala Tranquila and Contaminado. On December 15, 1989, Ritmo Peligroso participated in an environmental concert organized by WFM radio at the WTC arena in Mexico City with their signature song, Contaminado. Their latest album, Matacandela, was produced by Sabo Romo of Caifanes and co-produced by Piro and Avi Michel J. The band is working on a live recording CD/DVD together with a documentary telling the history of the group.

== Discography ==
=== As Dangerous Rhythm ===
- Electroshok (1980)
- Los jototes (1981)
- Marielito English version (1984)

=== As Ritmo Peligroso ===
- En La Mira (1985)
- Ritmo Peligroso (1988)
- Cortes Finos (1998)
- Matacandela (2001) -Produced by Sabo Romo, Piro and Avi Michel J.-
- Pa‘lante Hasta Que Tú Body Aguante (2018) 40th Anniversary Limited Edition.
- Rompe Mi Sentimiento (2020) 42nd Anniversary
- Pachanga Peligroso (2023)

=== Compilations ===
- Comrock (1984)
- Rock en tu Idioma Diez Años II (Rock in your Language Ten Years II) (1997)
- Rock en tu Idioma Diez Años III (Rock in your Language Ten Years III) (1999)
- Encuentros Musicales 2000 (Musical Encounters 2000)(2000)
- Crónica del Rock en Español - Edición 1 (Chronicle of Rock in Spanish- 1st Edition)(2001)
- Lo Mejor del Rock Mexicano (Best Mexican Rock) (2006)
- Lo Esencial de Rock en tu Idioma en Concierto (The Essentials of Rock in your Language in concert) (2010)

== Members ==
=== Current Lineup ===
- Piro Pendas - Voice, percussion, flute and harmonica
- Avi Michel - Bass, chorus
- "Mongus" Ávila - Guitar, chorus
- Mosy Bit - Guitar, chorus
- Jorge "Gato" Arce - Drums
- Jorge Bautista - Percussion
- Manny Murillo - Percussion

=== Former members ===
- Pablo Novoa
- Fernando Nava
- Diego García
- Pablo Rascón
- Rafael Espinosa
- Armando Espinosa "Pinaca"
- Marcelo Aramburu
- Johnny Danger/Cable (Paco Méndez)
- Rip Sick
- Cándido Neria
- Carlos Warman
- Jorge D’avila
- Fernando D’avila
- Manuel a
