= List of music artists and bands from Mexico =

List of Mexican music artists and bands by genre

This is a list of music artists and bands from Mexico, categorized according to musical genre.

== World Music ==
- Radaid

== Symphonic Bands ==
- Cuarteto Latinoamericano

== Latin Jazz ==
- Eugenio Toussaint
- Betsy Pecanins
- Lila Downs
- Magos Herrera

== Lounge ==
- Juan García Esquivel

== Son Jarocho ==
- Son de Madera

== Ranchera and Mariachi ==
- Mariachi Vargas de Tecalitlán
- Mariachi Charanda

Foundational Figures / Golden Age of Mexican Cinema (1930s–1950s)

- Lucha Reyes
- Jorge Negrete
- Luis Pérez Meza
- Pedro Infante
- Blanca Estela Pavón
- Miguel Aceves Mejía
- José Alfredo Jiménez
- Saúl Martínez García
- Cuco Sánchez
- Flor Silvestre
- Amalia Mendoza
- Lupe Mejía
- “Las Tesoros”: Rita Vidaurri, Blanca Rodriguez, Beatriz Llamas

Classic & Mid-Century Artists (1950s–1980s)

- David Záizar
- Lola Beltrán
- Javier Solís
- Chavela Vargas
- Antonio Aguilar
- Irma Serrano
- Lucha Villa
- Cornelio Reyna
- Gerardo Reyes
- Mary Jiménez
- Yolanda del Río
- Vicente Fernández
- Maria de Lourdes

Modern & Contemporary Revival (1980s–2000s)

- Rocío Dúrcal
- Paquita la del Barrio
- Juan Gabriel
- Joan Sebastian
- Luis Miguel
- Ana Gabriel
- Pepe Aguilar
- Pedro Fernández
- Alejandro Fernández
- Pablo Montero
- Natalia Jiménez
- Lety López

New & Contemporary (2010s–Present)

- Shaila Dúrcal
- Ángela Aguilar
- Lorenzo Negrete
- Christian Nodal
- Lupita Infante
- Leonardo Aguilar

== Norteño ==
- Los Tigres del Norte
- Ramón Ayala
- Raza Obrera
- Intocable
- Conjunto Primavera
- La Mafia
- Valentín Elizalde
- Los Tucanes de Tijuana (they often cross between Norteño and Narcocorrido)
- Los Cadetes de Linares
- Carín León

=== Nortec ===
Nortec Collective

== Norteña and Corrido ==
- Los Invasores de Nuevo León

== Corrido ==
- Los Alegres de Terán
- Los Cadetes de Linares

=== Narcocorrido ===
- Ramón Ayala
- Chalino Sánchez
- Los Tigres del Norte
- Los Tucanes de Tijuana
- Grupo Exterminador
- Raza Obrera

== Banda ==
- Banda El Recodo
- Lupillo Rivera
- Pancho Barraza
- El Coyote y su Banda Tierra Santa
- La Arrolladora Banda El Limón
- Espinoza Paz
- Julión Álvarez
- Gerardo Ortiz
- Tito Torbellino
- Ariel Camacho
- Luis Coronel
- Banda Carnaval
- Remmy Valenzuela
- Banda MS

== Duranguense ==
- Patrulla 81
- Grupo Montéz de Durango
- K-Paz de la Sierra
- Alacranes Musical
- Los Horóscopos de Durango
- Conjunto Atardecer
- AK-7
- Los Primos de Durango

== Ballad ==
1940s–1950s

- Cuco Sánchez

1960s

- Los Freddy's
- Los Babys
- José José
- Verónica Castro

1970s

- Emmanuel
- Yuri
- Los Bukis
- Marco Antonio Solís
- Joan Sebastian
- Los Caminantes

1980s

- Luis Miguel
- Lucero
- Mijares
- Alejandra Guzmán
- Los Temerarios
- Bronco
- Grupo Bryndis
- Guardianes del Amor
- Cristian Castro
- Los Dinos

1990s

- Los Mismos
- Ana Bárbara
- Pepe Aguilar

2010s

- Río Roma

== Mexican-Spaniard Fusion ==
- Rodrigo y Gabriela

== Bolero ==
1920s–1930s

- María Grever
- Agustín Lara
- Consuelo Velázquez
- José Ángel Espinoza

1940s–1950s

- Álvaro Carrillo
- Los Panchos

1960s–1970s

- Armando Manzanero

1980s–1990s

- Óscar Chávez
- Los Acosta

== Pop ==
1980s – Early 1990s

- Luis Miguel
- Juan Gabriel
- Yuri
- Flans
- Timbiriche
- Fandango
- Alejandra Guzmán
- Ana Gabriel
- Magneto
- Bibi Gaytán

Mid–Late 1990s

- Paulina Rubio
- Gloria Trevi
- Fey
- Kabah
- Sentidos Opuestos
- Aleks Syntek
- Cristian Castro
- Benny Ibarra
- Irán Castillo
- Imanol
- Kairo
- Elefante
- Edith Márquez

Early–Mid 2000s

- Reik
- RBD
- Camila
- Sin Bandera
- Belinda
- Moderatto
- Playa Limbo
- Kalimba
- Ha*Ash
- Leonel García
- María José
- Belanova
- Jesse & Joy
- Pepe Aguilar

Mid 2000s – Electropop / Alternative

- Kinky
- Plastilina Mosh
- Café Tacuba
- Zoé
- Mexican Institute of Sound
- La Castañeda
- Chetes
- Los Daniels
- Play

2010s – Present

- Natalia Lafourcade
- Dulce María
- Danna Paola
- Ximena Sariñana
- Carla Morrison
- Yuridia
- Lynda Thomas
- Paty Cantú
- Carlos Rivera
- Alexander Acha
- Alejandro Ibarra
- Litzy
- Anahí
- Jeans
- OV7
- Samo

== Mexican cumbia ==
1970s – Early 1980s

- Rigo Tovar

Late 1980s – Early 1990s

- Los Ángeles Azules
- Fito Olivares
- Selena
- Selena y Los Dinos

Early – Mid 1990s

- Banda Machos

Late 1990s – Early 2000s

- Kumbia Kings
- El Gran Silencio

2000s – 2010s

- Celso Piña

== Rock ==
classic old-school Mexican rock and roll singers and bands from the 1950s-60s:

Johnny Laboriel – Pioneer of Mexican rock, lead singer of Los Rebeldes del Rock, known for Spanish-language rock hits.

Luis Pérez Meza – Folk singer incorporating rock rhythms into traditional Mexican music.

=== Classic Rock en Español / Latin Rock ===
Bands blending traditional Mexican sounds with rock, or inspired by classic Latin rock:

- Caifanes — Rock en español, gothic, post-punk
- Jaguares — Rock en español, alt rock (Caifanes offshoot)
- Fobia — Rock en español, new wave, pop rock
- Botellita de Jerez — Guacarrock (rock + Mexican folk)
- Arturo Meza — Progressive rock, folk rock, experimental
- El Azote — Folk/experimental rock (scarce info, likely in this group)
- Los Jaigüey — Experimental rock, psychedelic, with vintage Mexican rock feel

=== Hard Rock / Alt Metal ===
- Molotov — Rap rock, alt metal, funk rock
- The Warning — Hard rock, alt rock
- Panda — Post-hardcore, emo (bridges here and pop punk)

=== Garage Rock / Punk / Riot Grrrl ===
- Le Butcherettes — Garage punk, riot grrrl, experimental rock

=== Alternative ===
- La Gusana Ciega — Alternative rock, Britpop influences
- La Revolución de Emiliano Zapata (psychedelic/rock en español roots)

=== Indie Rock / Dream Pop / Psychedelia ===
- Hello Seahorse! — Indie pop, dream pop, synthpop
- Enjambre — Psychedelic rock, alt rock
- Rey Pila — Indie rock, synth rock
- Chikita Violenta — Indie rock, noise pop
- Volován — (also fits here)
- Los Jaigüey — (also fits here)

=== Experimental / Progressive / Fusion ===
- Adrián Terrazas-González — Experimental/progressive (ex–Mars Volta)
- Arturo Meza — Progressive, folk, experimental
- Size — Post-punk, electronic rock, new wave
- Los Jaigüey — (appears across multiple groups due to diverse influences)

=== Heavy Metal and Hardcore Punk ===
- Brujeria — Extreme metal, deathgrind, grindcore
- Chingón — Heavy metal, Mexican metal with traditional influences
- Doomsday — Hardcore punk, metalcore
- Velvet Darkness — Power metal, heavy metal
- Hacavitz — Black/death metal
- Transmetal — Thrash metal, speed metal

=== Unclassified or Limited Information ===
- Big Spin — Possibly punk/skate punk

== Nueva Canción, Nueva Trova / Protest Music ==
- Amparo Ochoa
- Fernando Delgadillo

== Electronic Music ==
- Mœnia
- Hocico
- Amduscia
- Rey Pila
- Songs for Eleonor

== Tecnobanda and Tecnocumbia ==
- Banda el Recodo
- Banda Maguey
- Banda MS
- La Arrolladora Banda El Limón

== Mexican Guaracha and Tribal ==
- 3Ball MTY
- Fresku (Mexican rapper with tribal elements)

== Merengue ==
- Garibaldi
- Grupo Climax

== Bachata ==
- Maite Perroni

== Reggaeton Mexa ==
- Peso Pluma
- El Bogueto
- Yng Lvcas
- Bellakath

== Hip Hop ==
- Control Machete
- Cartel de Santa
- Santa Fe Klan
- Alemán
- Gera MX
- Dharius

== Reggae en Español ==
- Antidoping
- Los de Abajo

== Ska ==
- Panteón Rococó
- Inspector
- La Maldita Vecindad

== See also ==
Regional styles of Mexican music
