= Alexandra Rodríguez de Ruíz =

Mexican activist, writer, researcher (born 1962)

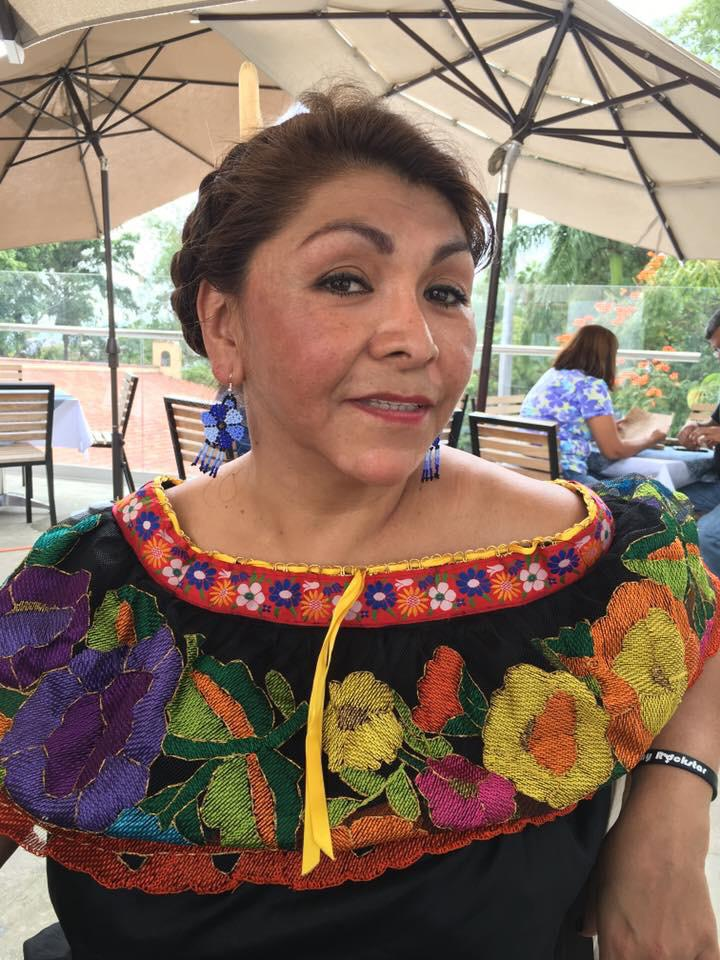
Alexandra R. DeRuiz in 2022

Alexandra Rodríguez de Ruíz (also known as Alexandra Byerly) is a transfeminist activist, writer, performer, and researcher whose work sits at the intersection of gender justice, migration, and human rights. For decades, she has used both scholarship and artistic performance to shed light on the overlapping systems of oppression (transphobia, racism, and anti-immigrant violence) that shape the lives of trans Latina communities on both sides of the U.S.-Mexico border. She is credited as a co-founder of El/La para TransLatinas, a landmark nonprofit organization based in San Francisco, and coined the term TransLatinas as a framework of identity and empowerment.

== Background and early years ==
Rodríguez was born October 14, 1962, in Mexico City and grew up in Mexico City during a period when being visibly trans meant living under constant threat. By the time she was a teenager in the late 1970s, the hostile climate in Mexico — marked by harassment, institutional indifference, and physical danger for trans people — had become untenable. Rather than remain in those conditions, she made the decision to cross the U.S.-Mexico border without documentation, a journey she would later describe and memorialize in her writing and performances.

She eventually settled in the Bay Area of California, where she pursued studies in psychology at the City College of San Francisco. Her educational path also took her to Bangkok, Thailand, where she completed specialized training in transgender health through the TEACH (Trans Education and Advocacy for Capacity-building in Health) program. Years later, she returned to Mexico and studied literature and creative writing at the Universidad del Claustro de Sor Juana. She also holds a TEFL certification from the University of Dayton, and has worked professionally as an English instructor and translator.

== Founding El/La para TransLatinas and the term "TransLatinas" ==
The murder of her childhood friend Ana Fernández in San Francisco became a turning point. Beyond the violence of the killing itself, Rodríguez was deeply affected by the way media coverage stripped Fernández of her dignity — reducing her to stigmatizing labels, using the wrong name, and misgendering her even in death. This experience crystallized her commitment to frontline advocacy, and she relocated to San Francisco specifically to organize around the needs of trans migrant women.

In 2006, together with activist Isa Noyola and scholar Marcia Ochoa, she helped establish El/La para TransLatinas, contributing to its work until 2011. It was within this context that she introduced the term TransLatinas — a deliberate choice to move away from clinical or generalized language and toward something that honored the specific cultural and geographic roots of the women she worked with. The word acknowledged that these were Latin American women who had migrated to the United States, and over time it grew into a symbol of collective pride, resistance, and visibility.

== Return to Mexico ==
After more than thirty years abroad, Rodríguez returned to Mexico City. What began as a temporary stay to write an autobiographical book became a permanent decision when she encountered the ongoing precarity and danger facing women and trans people in the country. She chose to stay and redirect her activist energy toward Mexico's trans communities.

Since 2021 she has led La Jauría Trans, a digital program offering guidance, community connection, and access to resources for trans and non-binary people in Mexico City.

== Writing and performance work ==
Performance has been central to Rodríguez's practice as an activist from early on. Beginning in 2007 in San Francisco, she staged political performances — including at Queer Rebelión — that drew directly from her own biography as a trans migrant woman. Rodríguez doesn’t shy away from overt political references or opinions in her works–she is often pointed and intentional. Rather than abstract advocacy, her performances confront audiences with lived experiences: border crossings, violence, and survival.

Her essay Queers Resisting Trump and White Supremacy in Mexico City (2017) examined queer and trans resistance in a specific political moment, published in QED: A Journal in LGBTQ Worldmaking.

In 2016, she contributed to the academic anthology Trans Studies: The Challenge to Hetero/Homo Normativities, edited by Yolanda Martínez-San Miguel — a collection that sought to build bridges between trans scholarship and on-the-ground activism.

Her essay Jotas, vestidas, cuinas, locas y mariposas (2018), published through Libros UNAM, explored the history of trans identity and community in Mexico City through personal and collective memory. That same year, she contributed a reflection on indigenous governance and trans perspectives to Radio Zapatista.

In 2023, she published her memoir Crucé la frontera en tacones (Egales, Madrid), a deeply personal account of leaving Mexico as a young trans woman, crossing the border undocumented, and constructing an entirely new life in the United States. The book was presented at TEA Tenerife Espacio de las Artes, which has also featured her work in broader programming on the realities of trans migrant life.

== Awards and recognition ==
- 2019 — Compton's Riots Transgender Pioneer Award, Compton's Transgender Cultural District — honoring her lasting contributions to trans Latina advocacy.
- 2011 — Premio Vanguardia, Transgender Law Center — for her role in advancing the legal standing of transgender people in San Francisco.
- 2009 — Special recognition, Bay Area National Latino AIDS Awareness Day — for her sustained work on behalf of trans Latina health and rights.
