= Before Gender =

2025 book by Eli Erlick

- Authors: Eli Erlick
- Language: English
- Subject: Transgender history
- Publisher: Beacon Press (US) and Manchester University Press (UK)
- Publication date: 2025
- Media type: Print (hardcover)
- Pages: 268 (first edition)
- ISBN: 978-080701825-5

Before Gender: Lost Stories from Trans History, 1850–1950 is a 2025 history book by writer and activist Eli Erlick. The book describes the lives of thirty transgender people in the 19th and 20th centuries, and aims to refute the belief that transgender people are a recent phenomenon.

== Background ==
Eli Erlick, who transitioned as a child in the early 2000s, cited claims that transgender people did not exist until recently, and the 2020s attacks on transgender people, as why she created the book. While she was writing the book, US politicians introduced numerous bills targeting transgender people. Erlick explained that addressing racism and transmisogyny also inspired the book, “In the past decade, there have been at least half-a dozen books on white trans people in Western countries specifically. I wanted this book to focus on everyone else.” The London School of Economics Review of Books added, "What is lacking in available scholarly literature is such a concentrated account of case studies, with an exclusive focus on the lives of trans people – a gap breached by Erlick’s work."

== Synopsis ==
The book is divided into four sections on children, activists, workers, and athletes, each featuring stories of transitioning between 1850 and 1950. Erlick claims the stories provide an "entirely new history of transgender people". The book includes records of transgender minors who received hormone replacement therapy in the 1930s, decades before previous reports. It also uncovered the details of what Erlick calls the Rauchfangswerder and Ueno Park riots of 1930 and 1948, two LGBT uprisings predating the Stonewall riots by decades. Erlick claims they are "the two earliest known queer and trans uprisings". Erlick also features the story of Sally-Tom, a formerly enslaved trans woman who gained approval to live as a woman from the Freedmen's Bureau, which she argues makes her the earliest known trans person to change their sex legally in the US.

=== Biographies featured in the book ===
- Mark and David Ferrow
- Effie Smith
- Masoud El Amaratly
- Ray Leonard
- Mabel Stanley
- Emma Heinrich
- Willie Ray
- Sally-Tom
- Gerda von Zobeltitz
- Carl Crawford
- Mollie Wilson
- Muksamse'lapli
- Sadie Acosta
- Georgia Black
- Okiyo
- Maude Milbourne
- Josephine Robinson
- Elsie Marks
- Albín Pleva
- John Berger
- Allred Grouard
- Ann Storcy
- Frank Williams
- Frances Anderson
- Agustín Rodríguez
- Štefán Pekár
- Bill Winters
- Léon Caurla and Pierre Brésolles

== The Cleopatra Problem ==
Scholarly debates surrounding the historicity of naming past figures as transgender led Erlick to coin the term "the Cleopatra problem", a historical method that figures present language to past subjects. "Cleopatra was a woman even though she lived over one thousand years before the word woman existed. Does that mean we should refuse to call her a woman? How do we know she was a woman and why? Cisgender women had different gender roles two thousand years ago, just as the expectations for trans people differed", Erlick writes. Erlick argues this same problem could also be applied to the terms gay and Latina. The London School of Economics Review of Books described, "Attempts to retrospectively determine whether someone is trans may be seen as problematic, though some scholars and activists do take this approach[...] She addresses this issue by citing "the Cleopatra problem", the complete lack of agency historical figures have over what we call them. Supporting her choice to apply the term is Erlick’s clear definition of transness from the outset: While there are many varying definitions of what it may mean to be trans, her definition encompasses "anyone identifying outside of their sex assigned at birth.""

In an interview with PinkNews, Erlick explained, "Everyone agrees Cleopatra [was] a woman. There’s no debate about this, and there shouldn’t be, it’s set in stone. So why do we have the same debate about trans people? In Cleopatra’s time, there were different gender roles and different ways of expressing gender identity. They had different terms. The word woman didn’t exist until the 1100s, so why are we calling her a woman, but not trans women in the 1910s? We’re treating this category differently and I feel there’s a political reason behind that.”

== Reception ==
The book received positive reception, with Publishers Weekly calling it "an essential and eye-opening paradigm shift." Ms. Magazine praised the book, adding "By sharing 30 stories about kids, activists, workers and athletes, Erlick fills a giant gap in the remarkable histories of trans individuals." Library Journal also recommended the book, adding, "this book humanizes and historicizes the lives and identities of trans people in ways that, now more than ever, are critical for navigating systems that thrive on erasure, obfuscation, and misrepresentation of marginalized communities." The London School of Economics Review of Books praised, "Erlick achieves a clear goal to demonstrate that there is nothing novel or uncommon about being transgender; trans folks have been around for much longer than the current anti-trans hysteria would suggest. Trans liberation is not an impossible feat, the book reminds us, but one that requires community, allyship, and solidarity."

== See also ==
- Female Husbands: A Trans History
- Transgender Warriors
- Presentism (historical analysis)
- Transgender history
