= Rita Guerrero =

Mexican artist

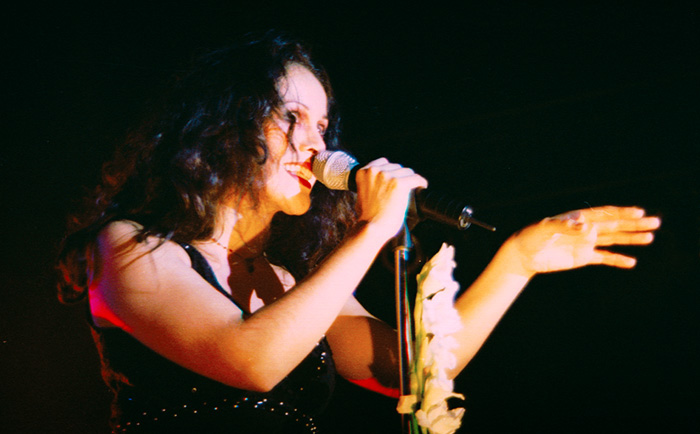
- Born: May 22, 1964; Guadalajara, Mexico
- Died: March 11, 2011 (aged 46); Tlalpan, Mexico City, Mexico
- Occupations: Actress, musician

Rita Guerrero (May 22, 1964 – March 11, 2011) was a Mexican artist active in various fields, mainly music and theater. She was vocalist of the rock band Santa Sabina, of which she was the most visible figure. After leaving the group, she was part of Ensamble Galileo, a project dedicated to the interpretation of Baroque music. Guerrero also hosted some television programs and supported various social movements in Mexico, such as the Zapatista Army of National Liberation and the country's electoral left.

== Early years ==
Rita Guerrero was born in Guadalajara, Jalisco on May 22, 1964, the youngest of 11 siblings. She characterized her mother as a "big" and "traditional" woman, while her father was a trumpeter who taught her some guitar and awakened her love of the arts. One of her brothers bought her a piano so she could learn to play. Rita's father died when she was nine years old.

At age 10 she began her instruction in the children's music workshop of the University of Guadalajara's Department of Fine Arts. Years later at the same house of studies she began her training as a pianist, but did not finish because, she later said, she was in her adolescence and was in "rebellion". She tried to leave the family home at age 17, but returned due to pressure from her mother. At age 20, she moved to Mexico City alone to enter the University Theater Center (CUT) at the National Autonomous University of Mexico (UNAM), where she studied Acting. In 1987, she took part in the UNAM student strike and met Los Psicotrópicos, an experimental jazz group. Guerrero participated in some activities with them, such as concerts to support the university strikers.

== Acting career ==
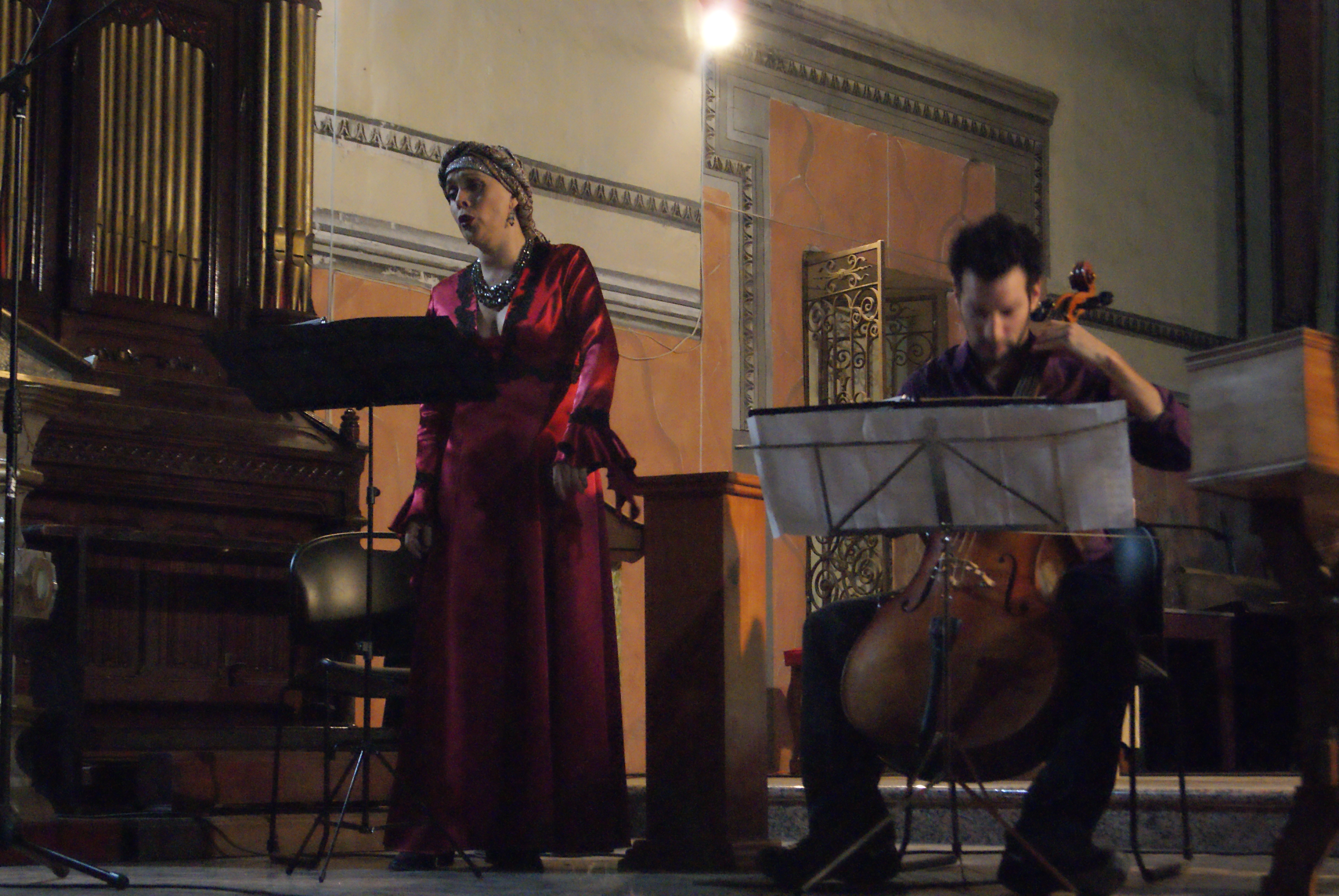
Ensamble Galileo concert, with Rita Guerrero, at the Chapel of San Ildefonso, Puebla

Guerrero's acting training concluded in 1987, but she had already appeared in the telenovela Martín Garatuza, produced by Televisa in 1986, playing the character Blanca. She decided not to participate in further telenovelas, because she believed that they "pigeonhole the actors". Beginning in 1987, Guerrero worked independently as an actress and assistant director on some plays.

In 1988 she appeared in David Hevia's Vox thanatos, with original music by Jacobo Lieberman. This marked the beginning of her work with Santa Sabina, the rock band of very diverse influences with which she rose to fame. In 1989 she starred in the medium-length film Samuel for the CCC, a still image from which was used as the cover of Santa Sabina's first self-titled album. In 1990 she appeared in one of the ten stories that make up Ciudad de ciegos, a left-leaning film directed by Alberto Cortés. In the film – scored by the group formed by Santa Sabina, Saúl Hernández, and El Sax from Maldita Vecindad – Guerrero plays Marisela, a young woman who has such a liberal mother that she is allowed to have sex with her boyfriend in her bedroom.

In 1990 she also hosted the program Águila o rock on Channel 11, where she presented the most significant Mexican rock bands.

In 1991 she starred in Daniel Gruener's debut short film Amazona alongside Roberto Sosa and Darío T. Pie.

In 1996 she appeared as a lead host in a scientific outreach project for Channel 22 entitled La materia de los sueños. The main theme song was "Ajusco Nevado", played by Santa Sabina. She also hosted the Channel 22 youth interest program Cultura en línea.

In 2001–2002 she acted in the play La Noche que raptaron a Epifania directed by Ana Francis Mor. In 2002, she also performed and sang alongside actress Ofelia Medina in the show Una tertulia Musical en el Convento under the direction of Alejandro Reza.

In 2009 she directed and performed the show Llivre Vermell with the Chorus of the University of the Cloister of Sor Juana. In 2010 she directed and performed the show Música Divina Humanas Letras, a theatrical play around the carols of Sor Juana, with the Chorus of the University of the Cloister and Ensamble Galileo.

== Santa Sabina ==
Rita Guerrero met the jazz group Los Psicotrópicos in 1988 while they were providing music for a play in which she performed. It was made up of the keyboardist Jacobo Lieberman, bassist Alfonso Figueroa, guitarist Pablo Valero, and drummer Patricio Iglesias; Guerrero was added as vocalist. Lieberman left the group in 1991 and his place was taken by Juan Sebastián Lach, who was key in shaping the musical style of Santa Sabina, a combination of dark wave and gothic rock influences with underground tendencies. The band was one of the most emblematic of the Mexican rock scene during the 1990s, which it entered in 1992 with the release of its album Santa Sabina on Discos Culebra, a BMG label.

Rita Guerrero worked mainly as the band's vocalist, however she was involved in the composition and arrangements, and wrote some of their songs, although most were written by Adriana Díaz Enciso and Jordi Soler.

== Illness and death ==
In February 2010, Rita Guerrero began treatment for breast cancer at the General Hospital of Mexico. Covered by Seguro Popular but faced with difficulties involved in the procedures of this care system, she opted to be treated in another establishment that included the use of alternative medicine. Úrsula Pruneda, Mariana Rodríguez, Juan Sebastián Lach, Aldo Max, Alfonso Figueroa, and Alejandro Otaola announced publicly on October 19, 2010, that Guerrero was suffering from cancer and that they would organize a collection to pay for her medical expenses. The next day, the singer and actress wrote on her Facebook page that the situation was not "as critical" as had been assumed from the statements of her friends, who were worried about her physical and emotional health and wanted to support her. Despite the illness, Rita Guerrero continued with her musical projects, including Ensamble Galileo and the direction of the Chorus of the University of the Cloister of Sor Juana.

On November 30, 2010, several rockers and musician friends of Guerrero announced that they would hold a concert for her benefit on December 6. The participants were Los Jaigüey, Jaime López, Jorge Fratta, Alonso and José María Arreola, Monocordio, Alejandro Otaola, Iraida Noriega and Daniel Zlotnik, La Maldita Vecindad, La Lupita, Los músicos de José, Lo Blondo of Hello Seahorse! with some members of Zoé, Natalia Lafourcade, Julieta Venegas, Rubén Albarrán and Meme from Café Tacvba, El jardín de las delicias, and the reunited Santa Sabina, including an appearance by Guerrero. The concert was titled Rita en el corazón and took place at the Teatro de la Ciudad.

Rita Guerrero died on March 11, 2011, at age 46 as a result of breast cancer at the National Cancer Institute of Mexico, located in Tlalpan. The University of the Cloister of Sor Juana, whose chorus she directed, held a viewing of her remains and a posthumous tribute in her memory.

== Tributes ==
The Chorus of the Cloister of Sor Juana changed its name to Coro Virreinal Rita Guerrero in honor of the artist.

In 2018, Rita, el documental was released, a feature film documentary that recounts her life in Guadalajara, her arrival in Mexico City and studies at the CUT, her career with Santa Sabina, and her work at the Cloister. It was produced by Arturo Díaz Santana and Aldo Max Rodríguez with support from IMCINE and CUEC, and includes testimonies of Guerrero's family, friends, and collaborators. It premiered at the 33rd Guadalajara International Film Festival.

== Acting and hosting credits ==
=== Television ===
- Martín Garatuza (1986), as actress
- Águila o Rock (1990), as presenter
- La materia de los sueños (1996), as presenter
- América (1998), as presenter
- Cultura en línea (2001), as presenter
- El nuevo universo (2001), as narrator

=== Films ===
- Amazona (1991), short
- Ciudad de ciegos (1991), feature
- Todos son iguales (2001), documentary

=== Radionovelas ===
- La Fuga (2000)

=== Plays ===
- América (1987), based on Amerika by Franz Kafka
- Vox Thanatos (1988) by David Hevia
- La Toma del Balmori (1990)
- Monólogo con Farol (2000) by Adriana Díaz Enciso
- La Noche que Raptaron a Epifanía (2002)
- Una Tertulia Musical en el Convento (2002)
- Una Noche de los Veintes (2010)

== Discography ==
=== With Santa Sabina ===
==== Studio ====
- Santa Sabina (1992)
- Símbolos (1994)
- Babel (1995)
- Mar adentro en la sangre (2000)
- Espiral (2003)

==== Live ====
- Concierto acústico (1994)
- De la Raza, Pa' la Raza (1994)
- MTV Unplugged (1997)
- XV aniversario en vivo (2005)

=== With Ensamble Galileo ===
- Todos los bienes del mundo (2003)
- Una pieza de fuego (2005)

=== As director ===
- Coro de la Universidad del Claustro de Sor Juana (2010)

=== Guest appearances ===
- Ciudad de Ciegos (1990), soloist
- Mexican Divas Vol. 2 (2000), soloist
- Yo nunca vi televisión (2010), tribute to 31 Minutos accompanied by Los músicos de José
