= Feminist Studies Department (University of California, Santa Cruz) =

The Feminist Studies Department at the University of California, Santa Cruz constitutes one of the oldest departments of gender and sexuality studies in the world. It was founded as a women's studies department in 1974. It is considered among the most influential departments in feminist studies, post-structuralism, and feminist political theory. In addition to its age and reputation, the department is significant for its numerous notable faculty, graduates, and students.

== History ==
After its founding in 1974, the department became prominent in feminist studies research through the work of its scholars. The department works closely with the History of Consciousness program and the Humanities Division.

In 1990, Italian feminist, film theorist, and professor Teresa de Lauretis coined the term "queer theory" for the title of a Feminist Studies conference she organized at the University of California, Santa Cruz. She then edited a special issue of Differences: A Journal of Feminist Cultural Studies with based on the conference. This title and issue helped establish "queer" as an identity rather than a slur.

It received a $1 million grant from the Peggy and Jack Baskin Foundation in 2017, which named distinguished professor Bettina Aptheker the Presidential Chair of the endowment.

== Notable faculty ==
The department has had numerous notable professors and affiliated faculty. In the early 1980s Bettina Aptheker, the leader of the Berkeley Free Speech Movement and civil rights activist, became one of its first full-time faculty.

Angela Davis, among the most prominent writers in Feminist Studies, joined the department in 1991 and retired in 2008. She remains a Distinguished Professor Emerita. During her tenure, she co-founded Critical Resistance and was involved in several University of California, Santa Cruz conferences.

Donna J. Haraway is an American professor emerita in the history of consciousness and feminist studies departments at the University of California, Santa Cruz, and a prominent scholar in the field of science and technology studies. She has also contributed to the intersection of information technology and feminist theory, and is a leading scholar in contemporary ecofeminism. Her work criticizes anthropocentrism, emphasizes the self-organizing powers of nonhuman processes, and explores dissonant relations between those processes and cultural practices, rethinking sources of ethics.

Writer and feminist philosopher Gloria E. Anzaldúa taught at the department for years. Before and during this time, she authored This Bridge Called My Back: Writings by Radical Women of Color and Borderlands/La Frontera: The New Mestiza. Anzaldúa suddenly died in 2004 while still teaching there. She was posthumously awarded a doctorate in literature from her institution.

Other notable faculty include Karen Barad, B. Ruby Rich, Marcia Ochoa, Shelly Grabe and Gina Dent.

In addition, notable scholars such as bell hooks, Lisa Lowe, Sandy Stone, and Caren Kaplan attended lectures at the department in the 1980s while graduate students.
