= Agustín Rodríguez =

Agustín Rodríguez may refer to:

- Fray Agustín Rodríguez of the Chamuscado and Rodríguez Expedition
- Agustín Rodríguez Santiago (born 1959), Spanish footballer
- Agustín Javier Rodríguez (born 2004), Argentine footballer
- Agustín Rodríguez Tripiana (1878 – 1945), Spanish bullfighter
