= UCSJ =

UCSJ may refer to:

- University of the Cloister of Sor Juana, Mexico City
- Union of Councils for Soviet Jews
