= El Azote =

Mexican musical group

- Origin: Aguascalientes, Mexico
- Genres: Indie rock / Mexican rock
- Years active: 1997–present
- Labels: Discos Intolerancia / Opción Sónica
- Members: Abraham Velasco; Alejandro Vázquez; Gerardo Castmu
- Website: www.elazote.net

El Azote is an indie rock group from Aguascalientes, Mexico, formed in the late 1990s.

== Band description ==
Experimental Mexican Indie Rock band formed in Aguascalientes, Mexico towards the end of 1997. The band describes its sound as "Sonic Craft" (Artesanía Sonora). This characterization comes from their combination of folkloric arrangements and lyrics combined with experimental rock and subtle electronic arrangements.

The musical instruments they employ range from: drums and percussion instruments, electric and acoustic guitars, electric bass, fretless bass, whistles, bells, miscellaneous wind instruments, etc. Their musical influence ranges from all variants of rock music, blues, free jazz, contemporary music, experimentation, Mexican traditional music. They often read stories in their live presentations between sets, with surreal and mythical themes. Their Lyrics are likewise of ethereal and mythical nature. Throughout their years active, they have created a unique musical experience; not only for the audience, but for themselves.

Since they formed their band, they had thought of developing a musical proposal that would not limit them to the conscious restraints that other musicians often are limited by. They have achieved this distinction with their use of pantomime and theatrical elements on stage: An example of this is that vocalist, Alejandro Vázquez has painted his face as it is being distorted by standing behind a sheet of glass and wears different masks while singing. Alejandro Vázquez can be heard engaging the audience as he reads short stories between their live set of their album Suena Vivo, recorded live between January 2003 and October 2004, and features drummer Julián Villa who currently lives in Norway. The result in these lively performances has resulted in a positive reaction on the audience, as shown when they performed live for the presentation of their Suena Vivo album in 2004.

They have played in different types of venues, like theaters, bars, streets and festivals. Every time adapting their show to the venue they will be playing in. They have played with other Mexican musicians like Premiata Forneria Marconi, Santa Sabina, Azul Violeta, Cecilia Toussaint, Arturo Meza, Cabezas de Cera, Fratta, San Pascualito Rey, La Perra, etc.

== Current members ==
- Abraham Velasco - Bass, guitar, lyrics, music, chorus, voice.
- Alejandro Vázquez - Voice, stories, scenery, melodies.
- Gerardo Castmu - Guitar, drums, percussion.

== Discography ==
=== Albums ===
- El Azote (1999)
- El Color (2002)

=== Live recordings and re-issues ===
- Suena Vivo (2003)
- El Azote (Double Reissue) (2003)

== News articles ==
- Article from Government of The State of Aguascalientes website, Culture Section
- Article in mexican website Rocksonico.com
- Article in "IMPULSO", Mexico, Entertainment section
- Article in Spanish by Rock MX
