= Eli Erlick =

American activist and writer (born 1995)

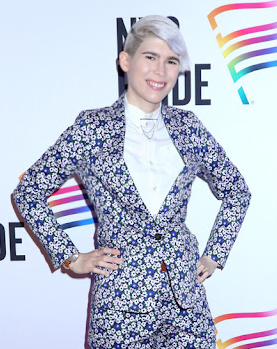
- Erlick in 2022
- Born: July 10, 1995 (age 31); Willits, California, U.S.
- Education: Pitzer College (BA); University of California, Santa Cruz (MA, PhD)
- Occupations: Writer; activist
- Years active: 2011–present
- Website: elierlick.com

Eli Erlick (born July 10, 1995) is an American activist, writer, and academic. She is the author of Before Gender: Lost Stories from Trans History, 1850–1950 and founder of the organization Trans Student Educational Resources.

== Early life ==
Eli Erlick was born on July 10, 1995. Her parents met while protesting, which she cites as a background for her activism. She is of Jewish heritage and grew up near the rural community of Willits, California. She came out as transgender when she was 8 years old, when she started to experience harassment, isolation, and violence. She could not use her school's restroom and was threatened and bullied for years after.

At age 13, her parents allowed her to publicly transition to female, keeping her birth name. She medically transitioned shortly after. Erlick then began her work in advocacy and writing at 15 and founded the organization Trans Student Educational Resources at age 16. Erlick graduated from Pitzer College with a Bachelor of Arts degree in Feminist, Gender, & Sexuality Studies and completed her PhD in Feminist Studies at the University of California, Santa Cruz in 2025.

== Activism ==
Erlick cites starting activism at age 15, in 2010, when she became a board member for an LGBTQ youth conference. She became public in media over a year later while advocating for California's School Success and Opportunity Act, the first state bill to protect transgender students. In 2013, Erlick worked with several series to discuss transgender activism, including SBS Dateline and TakePart Live. The same year, Erlick won a $25,000 fellowship from Boston-based nonprofit Peace First for her activism.

While advocating for admissions for trans students at women's colleges, she spoke about the importance of remaining skeptical of all policy work. In 2015, Erlick published an article on why equality should not be the goal of the transgender movement. In 2017, she began publicly advocating for self-expression of gender-nonconforming transgender women.

Erlick and a group of transgender activists erected a bronze sculpture of activist Marsha P. Johnson in 2021 in Christopher Park. The sculpture was not authorized by New York City Parks but later received a use permit, making it the first sculpture of a transgender person in New York City. The sculpture received positive reviews from art commentators, citing the criticism of George Segal's Stonewall National Monument for "whitewashing" the Stonewall Riots. The New York City Mayor's office had announced plans for a statue of Johnson and her collaborator, Sylvia Rivera, in 2019 but the statues never came to fruition.

In February 2022, Erlick alleged that conservative political commentator Matt Walsh was "attempting to dupe dozens of trans people and doctors into participating in an anti-trans documentary under false pretenses". She uncovered that Walsh had created a front organization, the Gender Unity Project, after his producer attempted to recruit her into the project. Walsh later revealed the project was part of his then-upcoming film, What Is a Woman?. A year later, Erlick made similar allegations against conservative media commentator Robby Starbuck for his film The War on Children.

In March 2023, Erlick recovered, restored, and colorized numerous photos from LGBTQ history. She attributes black-and-white photography as a factor in the erasure of trans people of color from history. In May 2023, Erlick appeared on a viral Vice Debates video, defending abortion and trans rights.

=== Trans Student Educational Resources ===
In 2011, at age 16, Erlick co-founded Trans Student Educational Resources, an organization "dedicated to transforming the educational environment for trans and gender nonconforming students through advocacy and empowerment." It is the only national organization led by transgender youth, and one of the largest transgender organizations in the United States.

In 2015, Erlick led national efforts with Trans Student Educational Resources to admit trans women at women's colleges. She also co-authored Trans Student Educational Resources' model policy for admissions of trans students at women's colleges. Erlick also co-founded Trans Youth Leadership Summit, a program run through Trans Student Educational Resources. It is the only national fellowship program in the United States for transgender youth. Several of its fellows have gone on to become prominent media advocates, activists, and organizers since its launch.

Erlick won the 2015 Westly Prize and 2016 Davis Projects for Peace Award for Trans Student Educational Resources.

=== Access to hormone therapy ===
In August 2022, conservatives including Tucker Carlson, Matt Walsh, and Blaire White criticized Erlick for detailing a plan on social media for individuals to send spare hormone therapy prescriptions to people in those US states which are working to criminalize such drugs, despite the law only allowing such drugs to be prescribed by a physician. Some conservatives reported her to federal authorities, including the Drug Enforcement Administration. Chaya Raichik said that her account Libs of TikTok was suspended from Twitter after accusing Erlick of distributing the medications.

Walsh accused Erlick of being a "confessed drug dealer" and later reported Erlick to the University of California, Santa Cruz, where she was a PhD candidate. After the university's leadership initially ignored Walsh, he shared the contact information for several leaders of the university on social media. The university then said in a statement that it "strongly supports transgender members of our community", adding that "[t]he university is aware of social media posts by one of our graduate students related to gender-affirming medical care outlawed in certain states. The university takes allegations of illegal activity seriously, harassment included." Erlick defended herself from criticism, saying that "all trans people should have access to gender-affirming care" and that "trans people have shared hormone replacement therapy treatments for over 80 years. This is nothing new or unique. It is important to add that no one is providing hormone replacement therapy to children and the accusations that I am are false and absurd." Erlick also accused Walsh of "profiting from the moral panic over transness through new followers, advertisers and pageviews. Money, fame and power are his only goals." Following Walsh's comments about her, Erlick received slurs, harassment, and threats of violence.

Erlick and other activists accused Walsh of stochastic terrorism, a term used to describe an incitement of violence against a target through social media with plausible deniability. Walsh denied these accusations of terrorism, arguing that sharing contact information that is publicly available does not constitute harassment and that criticizing someone does not constitute terrorism. Erlick alleged Walsh targeted her for her accusations that he misrepresented his documentary to potential interviewees.

== Academia ==
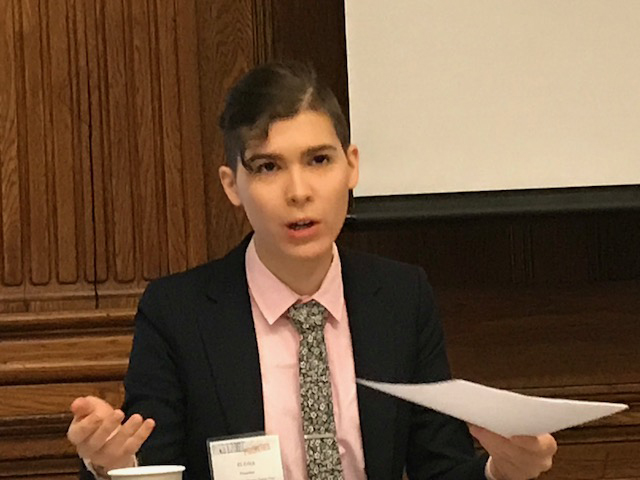
Erlick speaking at Harvard University in 2018

Erlick writes about political philosophy, social movements, and transgender communities. She completed her PhD at the University of California, Santa Cruz, in its Feminist Studies and History of Consciousness departments. In 2017, she became Glamour magazine's first transgender college woman of the year.

Her book Before Gender: Lost Stories from Trans History, 1850–1950 addresses "thirty intersectional and transnational case studies, centring trans lives often erased from mainstream accounts", for example the mustarjil folk singer Masoud El Amaratly. In 2017, she was a contributor to The Remedy: Queer and Trans Voices on Health and Healthcare, which won the Lambda Literary Award for LGBTQ Anthology.

== Public image ==
In 2016, Teen Vogue named Erlick the "New Face of Feminism" as a "young feminist changing the game". Refinery29 also named her one of their 30 Under 30 "rising stars" in 2013. Erlick writes for publications including Teen Vogue and Glamour about culture, media, and fashion. In 2017, Glamour named her College Woman of the Year, the first trans woman to receive the award in its 60-year history.

Erlick appeared as Sara Quin in the music video for Tegan and Sara's "Faint of Heart". She also narrated the series premiere of Hulu's How I Caught My Killer in 2023. Erlick has appeared in numerous publications discussing fashion and frequently models for fashion brands. In an interview with Yahoo News, Erlick stated that she felt pressured to dress femininely based on the widespread misunderstanding of gender identity and gender expression. Erlick describes herself as gender nonconforming.

Erlick has been a recurring guest on several news programs, including Dr. Phil, Piers Morgan Uncensored, and Huffington Post Live. She also appeared in the CollegeHumor Series Tales from the Closet in 2019.

== Personal life ==
Erlick is a graduate of Willits Charter School in Willits, California. Erlick is openly queer and lives in New York City.

== Bibliography ==
- "Depathologizing Trans" in The Remedy: Queer and Trans Voices on Health and Healthcare, Zena Sharman (ed.), Arsenal Pulp Press, 2016.
- "Trans Youth Activism on the Internet" in Frontiers: A Journal of Women Studies, 2018.
- "(Trans)forming Education: How Transgender Youth Are Leading the School Justice Movement" in Gender Diversity and LGBTQ Inclusion in Schools, Karyl E. Ketchum, Lisa Richardson, and Sharon Verner Chappell (eds.), Routledge, 2018.
- "Rethinking Nonbinary" in Nonbinary: Memoirs of Gender and Identity, Micah Rajunov and Scott Duane (eds.), Columbia University Press, 2019.
- Before Gender: Lost Stories from Trans History, 1850–1950, Beacon Press, 2025.
