= Georgia Black =

African American transgender woman (born 1906)

Black on her deathbed, 1951

Georgia Black (née Cantey; ca. 1892–June 1951), was an African American transgender woman who ran away from her home and lived as a woman from age 15 to her death. She was a respected member of the Sanford, Florida community, and remained so even as her status as someone assigned male at birth was leaked to the public following a medical examination.

== Life ==
Black's birth date is reported as being anywhere between 1891 and 1906, with the academic Eli Erlick claiming 1892 as "the most likely" date. Black began her gender transition at the age of 15, running away from the farm she worked at near Greeleyville, South Carolina, and living as a woman from then on. Black ran away to Charleston, South Carolina, and was invited to become a house servant in a mansion, where she entered into a relationship with a male retainer, who accepted her female gender identity. The relationship ended quickly, and 16 year old Black moved to Sanford, living there openly as a woman.

The doctor says he didn't see how I coulda married, but I don't pay no 'tention to that doctor. My husbands and me had a peaceful, lovely life

— Georgia Black

Later in Winter Garden, Florida, Black met Alonzo Sabbe (or Sabb), who was severely ill at the time. After his recovery, he asked Black to marry him. They found a judge who would allow this legally, marrying on January 14, 1912. In 1913, Alonzo and Black adopted a son, Willie Sabbe, who was a three-week old son of Georgia's cousin and a mother who died postpartum. The couple moved permanently to Sanford, Florida, and raised the child. Alonzo Sabbe was killed in 1917, after which in early 1918 Georgia married Muster Black, at the home of Joanna Moore, the principal of Sanford's Black elementary school. Soon after that Muster Black was drafted to fight in World War I, but was honorably discharged six months later without seeing combat. He died seven years after the marriage, after which Georgia was able to collect a pension from the Veterans Administration as a widow. Following the Great Depression, she was hired as a cook, becoming famous as "one of the best, if not the best, cake maker in town." She was also active in a church group of local St. James African Methodist Episcopal Church.

During the last months of her life Black's transgender identity was discovered by Dr. Orville Barks, the county physician who would later perform the autopsy on her body after her death. After discovering Black's male genitalia in 1950, the physician publicly revealed Georgia's information. The leak was met with backlash from the local community to Dr. Barks, as well as to the local newspaper, the Sanford Herald, for publishing a front page story about the revelation. Black remained a respected member of the Sanford community up to her death from terminal cancer in June.

== Legacy ==
In his book Black on Both Sides: A Racial History of Trans Identity, C. Riley Snorton cites Black as an example of a figure who emerges in the queer press and offers a way to "narrate trans embodiment in the postwar, early Cold War period" as her story reflects on the violence and aftermath of World War II, the decolonial struggles throughout the Global South and Jim Crow segregation in the United States. Snorton argues that the narrative of Georgia Black, as covered by Ebony, illustrates how black trans figures "were mobilized to meditate on intramural black life, not simply as it related to matters of gender and sexuality but also as it pertained to shifting notions of human valuation."
