= Nicole Santamaría =

Salvadoran human rights and LGBTQ activist

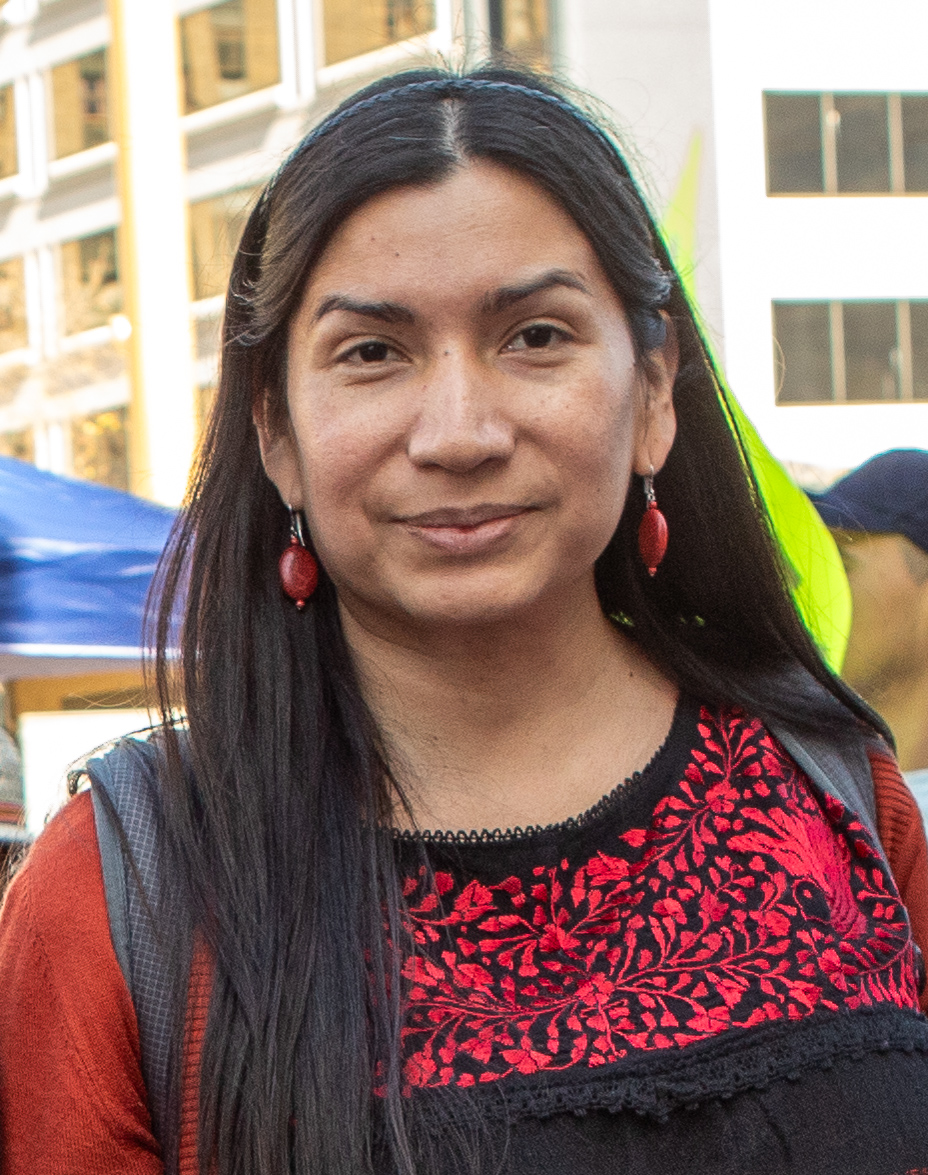
- Santamaría in 2020
- Born: October 10, 1979 (age 46); El Salvador
- Education: José Matías Delgado University
- Organization: El/La Para TransLatinas
- Known for: Human rights and LGBTQ activism

Nicole Santamaría (born October 10, 1979) is a Salvadoran human rights and LGBTQ activist based in San Francisco.

== Early life and education ==
Nicole Santamaría is an intersex and transgender woman from El Salvador. She was assigned male at birth and described being raised in a strong machismo culture. She also survived Salvadoran Civil War and a 1986 San Salvador earthquake, crediting Christian faith and Jesuit liberation theology for her resilience.

She studied art design at José Matías Delgado University, becoming a product designer later.

In 2004, while studying in Costa Rica, she was diagnosed with Klinefelter syndrome and decided to transition. At this time, she was trained as an art therapist.

== Activism ==
=== In El Salvador ===
Returning to El Salvador after two years of abroad study, Santamaría co-founded Colectiva Alejandría, focusing on advocating for LGBTQI+ rights, particularly for transgender, intersex, and gender-diverse individuals. Her work focused on access to education of this demographic, claiming "only 3% of [trans women] have an education" and speaking with Minister of Education about the discrimination at schools. She also spoke out against El Salvador abortion law, calling for exceptions in case of rape, threat to mother's health and unviable pregnancies.

Due to threats related to her activism, a brutal attack in 2015, and murder of Colectiva Alejandría board member Francela Méndez in the same year, Santamaría sought asylum in the United States.

=== In the United States ===
After relocating to the U.S., Santamaría became the Executive Director of El/La Para TransLatinas, a San Francisco-based organization that supports transgender Latinas, building a safe space for "trans Latinas, trans Latinx and the gender diverse community". She also advocated in the White House against discriminatory legislature, was Community Grand Marshal of 2021 San Francisco Pride, and did public speaking engagements, such as the Racial Justice Speaker Series at UC Davis School of Law.

As of 2018 Santamaría has been "an active leader" in the Anglican Church community, and in 2024 she was part of the group meeting with Pope Francis to represent Catholic trans and intersex people.
