= Santa Sabina (band) =

Mexican rock band

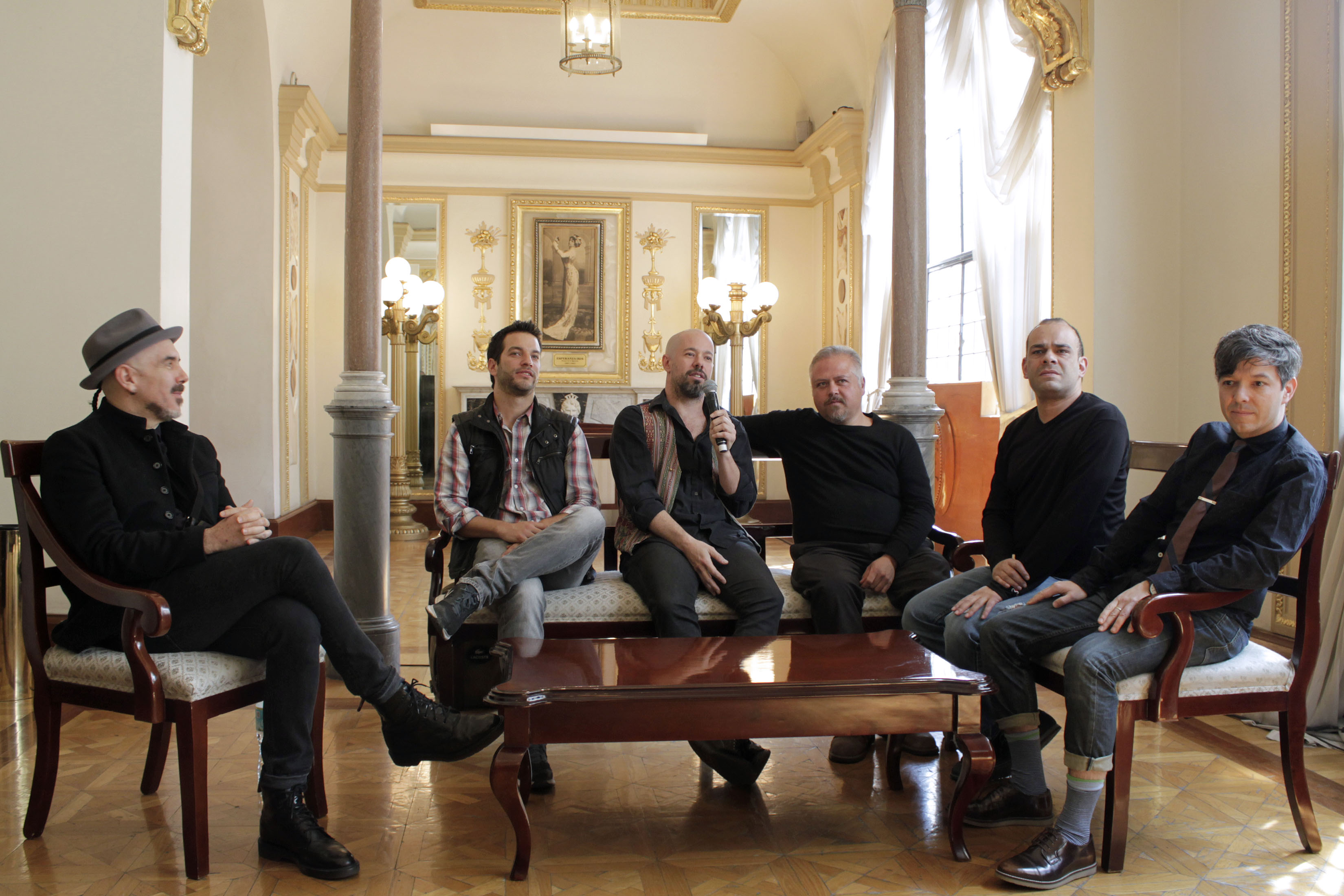
Press conference at the Teatro de la Ciudad Esperanza Iris to announce the Blue Almost concert 2015.

Santa Sabina was a Mexican rock band originally from Mexico City. The group was formed in 1989 by singer Rita Guerrero, bassist Alfonso "Poncho" Figueroa, guitarist Pablo Valero and keyboardist Jacobo Lieberman. Juan Sebastian Lach was keyboardist for a while. The name of the group honors the memory of Maria Sabina, the Mazatec shaman who lived in the southern state of Oaxaca.

Santa Sabina are distinguished by their gothic rock and darkwave atmospheres, lyrics and stage presence. Their music, however, is perhaps best described as a variant of progressive rock which borrows heavily from jazz.

== History ==
At the end of the 1980s, Guerrero left her hometown of Guadalajara to attend the National Autonomous University of Mexico in Mexico City to pursue a career in theatre. There, she met Poncho Figueroa, Pablo Valero and Jacobo Lieberman, who at that time were members of a jazz group called "the Psicotrópicos". "The Psicotrópicos" agreed to provide music for a play written for Guerrero's theatre class based on Franz Kafka's "Amérika". As they worked together, they realized they had a strong artistic affinity. After the dissolution of the "Psicotrópicos", they decided to form a new rock band that reflected their artistic vision. Although the group's lineup has changed through the years (as in the case of Pablo Valero and Jacobo Lieberman), the sound of the group, has evolved but remains faithful to its initial course.

Juan Sebastian Lach was the group's keyboard player on all its albums up through "Mar Adentro En La Sangre". Rather than replace him, the group instead invited cellist Leonel Perez and saxophone player Rodrigo Garibay to join. For its 15th Anniversary tour, Aldo Max replaced Garibay on saxophone. Guitarist Alex Otaola replaced Pablo Valero prior to the "Concierto Acustico" album. Drummer Patricio Iglesias left the band prior to "Mar Adentro En La Sangre". Julio Diaz was the group's drummer after Iglesias.

== Discography ==
=== Live albums ===
- Concierto Acústico (1994)
- MTV Unplugged (1997)
- XV Aniversario En Vivo (2005)

Their first albums, Santa Sabina (1992), Símbolos (1994, produced by Adrian Belew) and Babel (1996) were released through the now-defunct Mexican record label Culebra Records, a local branch of BMG Ariola. Their following albums, Mar adentro en la sangre (2001) and Espiral (2003), were independent productions. In 1997, they also recorded an album of their "unplugged" performance for MTV Latinoamerica called Santa Sabina Unplugged. In early 2006, the group released a double live album "XV Aniversario" which also included a DVD. After that, the group went on indefinite hiatus.

Many members of the group have remained active in music.

Rita Guerrero and Leonel Perez performed as part of Ensamble Galileo. This acoustic chamber group specializes in Renaissance-era music.

Poncho Figueroa organized and produced a tribute album to Mexican rock music pioneer Rodrigo "Rockdrigo" Gonzalez. He has also been performing in a trio called Los Jaiguey, along with brothers Gustavo and Ricardo Jacob, who released their first album in November 2009 and in March 2013 released their second album entitled Haciendo Tiempo (Doing Time).

Alex Otaola performed with La Barranca from 1998 to 2007 and has also been active as a guest guitarist on numerous projects. His solo album "Fractales" was released in September 2007.

Patricio Iglesias was absent from the music scene for almost 8 years due to various health problems. The band participated in a benefit concert on his behalf in 2005. However, he apparently made a full recovery, and in 2006 he appeared on the Cafe Tacuba triple live album and DVD, and he also played on Otaola's "Fractales" album.

Julio Diaz performed with Jorge "Ziggy" Fratta and others as well as performing concerts with his own group.

Juan Sebastian Lach moved to Europe and studied for a doctorate in cognitive musicology. He continued to write music, often with microtonal applications that involved either chamber groups or players and computers.

== Death of Rita Guerrero ==
Rita Guerrero, lead singer of the band, died on March 11, 2011, due to breast cancer, which was diagnosed in January, 2010. She had undergone chemotherapy, and as it was unsuccessful tried various treatments of alternative medicine. She was 47 at the time of her death.
