= Lupe Mejía =

- Also known as: "La Yaqui" "La Cancionera Yaqui"
- Born: Ciudad Obregón, Sonora, Mexico
- Genres: Ranchera
- Occupation(s): Singer, actress
- Instrument: Vocals
- Labels: Peerless; Orfeón; Musart; GAS

Lupe Mejía, nicknamed "La Yaqui" or "La Cancionera Yaqui" ("The Yaqui Songstress"), is a Mexican singer and actress, known for her career as a performer of rancheras and other Mexican folk music genres.

== Biography ==
Mejía was born in Ciudad Obregón, Sonora, Mexico. She began to sing at the age of 7 in school activities and among family members and friends. She began her career when she entered an amateur contest hosted by a television channel.

In Mexico City, she recorded her first single, "La flecha", with Peerless Records and its immediate success placed her among the most promising new Mexican singers. Her first album was titled La flecha and includes other songs such as "Cuando te hagan sufrir", "La fórmula", and "El pájaro desplumado". Her subsequent recordings for Peerless were also hits.

She also appeared in several Mexican films due to her success and popularity as a singer. She had acting roles in Condenados a muerte (1963) and El revólver sangriento (1964), where she worked with singers Antonio Aguilar and Juan Mendoza.

She has also recorded singles and albums for the Orfeón, Musart, and GAS labels.

== Discography ==
=== Studio albums ===
- La flecha
- México alegre y bravío
- Chiquita pero picosa y otros éxitos
- Lupe Mejía "La Yaqui"
- ¡Ánimo!
- Se me acobarda el corazón
- Lupe Mejía "La Yaaki"

=== Compilation albums ===
- 80 aniversario Peerless: 24 éxitos con mariachi y banda
