= Saúl Martínez García =

Background information
- Also known as: El Trovador del Recuerdo
- Born: Saúl Martínez García; March 30, 1914; Mexico
- Origin: Juchitán de Zaragoza, Oaxaca, Mexico
- Died: January 3, 1969 (aged 54)
- Genres: Folk
- Occupations: Composer, singer, troubadour, guitarist
- Instruments: Vocals, guitar
- Labels: RCA Victor, Orfeón

Saúl Martínez García (March 30, 1914 in Juchitán de Zaragoza, Oaxaca, Mexico – January 3, 1969 in Oaxaca, Mexico) was a Mexican composer, singer, troubadour and guitarist.

== Early life ==
As a child he showed interest in the guitar and was taught by Gilberto Orozco to play melodies with it. He emigrated to Mexico City where he studied at the Instituto Politécnico Nacional to become an accountant and auditor, although he still played the guitar and sang along with his studies. For a time he made musical arrangements to songs to isthmus melodies that were already well known, as well as perform his own compositions. During this period, Martínez was one of two members (alongside his friend David López) of "El Dueto Juchiteco" (The Duet from Juchitán).

== Career ==
When García participated on XEW-AM, the announcer Pedro De Lille dubbed him as "El Trovador del Recuerdo", and has been known since by that particular title. In 1948, Martínez released his first recording titled "Sones Istmo Oaxaqueños" that consisted of a collection of Oaxacan songs under the RCA Victor label. Prior to his first recording, Martínez was part of "Los Cancioneros del Sur" that provided vocals alongside Jorge Negrete in the 1945 Mexican film Camino de Sacramento.

== Death and legacy ==
On January 3, 1969, Saúl Martínez died in the city of Oaxaca, Mexico; his remains were moved to his birthplace and were interred in Miércoles Santo, in the Octava Sección located in Cheguigo, Oaxaca where they now rest.

On March 30, 2014, tribute was paid to Saúl Martínez at the Casa de la Cultura Juchitán in his birthplace of Juchitán de Zaragoza, Oaxaca, Mexico in celebration of the centenary of his birth.
