= Isa Noyola =

American activist

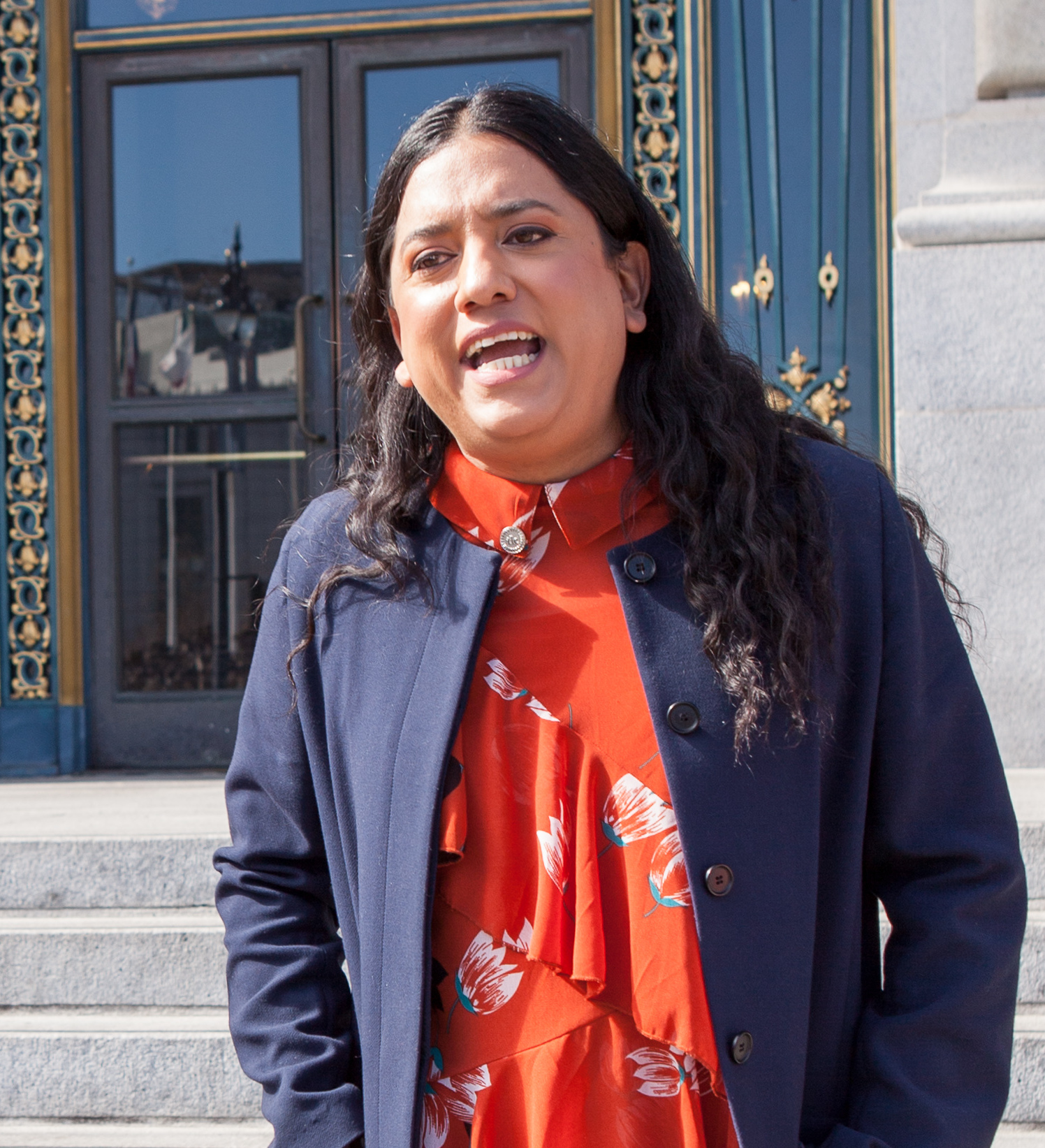
- Noyola at a rally outside San Francisco City Hall
- Born: July 22, 1978 (age 47); Houston, Texas, U.S.
- Occupations: Community Organizer; Activist

Isa Noyola (born July 22, 1978) is an American transgender (or translatina) activist, national leader in the LGBT immigrant rights movement, and deputy director at the Transgender Law Center. In 2015, she organized the first national trans anti-violence protest. This protest was an event that brought together over 100 activists, mostly trans women of color, to address the epidemic of violence trans communities face, especially as race and gender intersectionality relates to immigration and incarceration as they deal with transphobic systems.

== Early life ==
Noyola was born in Houston, Texas, to father Celestino Noyola and mother Anita Noyola (née Del Carmen Gonzales). She grew up in California. Her roots and family come from Comitán, Chiapas and San Luis Potosí, Mexico. Noyola has stated that she began to identify as a feminist after she was shamed as a child for pretending to be Wonder Woman. She was born and raised in the evangelical Pentecostal faith, where her parents were pastors and ran a church in the San Francisco Bay area for over 25 years.

Noyola has described herself as a translatina, activist, two-spirit, queer, "jota", "muxerista", and cultural organizer.

== Career ==
=== Transgender Law Center ===
Noyola is currently the Deputy Director of Programs at the Transgender Law Center which is a nonprofit organization working to remedy discrimination against transgender people. She also works on bringing the community issues directly to the systems that oppress the translatina community such as U.S. Immigration and Customs Enforcement, and educating politicians who often know very little about transgender people. She advocates for transgender women being released from ICE detention centers and works extensively with the goal to end deportations.

=== #Not1More ===
Noyola works with the #Not1More organization to build collaboration to change unjust immigration laws.

=== Other activities ===
She is on the advisory board for the El/La (Para Translatinas), FAMILIA:Trans Queer Liberation Movement, and Queer Undocumented Immigrant Project.

On May 28, 2015, Noloya along with about 70 other LGBTQ immigrants and allies formed a human chain blocking the entrance to the Santa Ana Police Department, protesting for an end to the detention and deportation of undocumented immigrants, particularly those who are part of the LGBTQ community. They were calling on the City of Santa Ana, California to terminate its contract with Immigration Customs Enforcement which imprisons trans and queer people in abusive conditions in the Santa Ana City Jail. The police declared the protest an unlawful assembly resulting in 5 arrests including Noyola.

=== El/La (Para TransLatinas) ===
Noyola founded and works as a national advocate with El/La Para TransLatinas, an organization for transgender Latinas (transLatina) that works to build collective vision and action to promote survival and improve TransLatinas quality of life in the San Francisco Bay Area. In Noyola's time with El/La her intersectional approach has been central to El/La's success. In 2013 the grassroots leadership development organization won a $200,000 grant from the San Francisco Human Rights Commission for violence-prevention work. Noyola says it marked the first time that trans Latinas received funding to develop community leaders in this way.

== See also ==
- Transgender Law Center
