= El/La Para TransLatinas =

Non-profit organization in San Francisco, US

El/La Para TransLatinas is a non-profit organization that provides legal, fiscal, educational, health, and other services to transgender Latinas. The organization was founded in San Francisco, California, in 2006.

El/La Para TransLatinas logo

== Foundation ==
El/La Para TransLatinas emerged in 2006 after the closure of Proyecto ContraSIDA por Vida and has since then continued their work in accordance with their mission statement of "[building] a world where translatinas feel they deserve to protect, love and develop themselves. By building this base, we support each other in protecting ourselves against violence, abuse and illness." Initially, El/La Para TransLatinas started as an HIV prevention organization for the LGBT community. Marcia Ochoa, Alexandra Rodriguez de Ruiz, and Isa Noyola are credited as the founders of El/La Para TransLatinas. As of June 2026, the executive director is Nicole Santamaría, the first trans person on this position.

== Financial struggles ==
In 2009, El/La Para TransLatinas was severely underfunded as they had lost much of their government funding because the city of San Francisco instead began allocating El/La's money towards Instituto Familiar de la Raza Inc. They eventually found a way to receive the funding back, but ran into financial problems in 2013. El/La was seeking an additional $80,000 from the city of San Francisco, "in order to hire a full-time case manager and expand the work it is doing around the domestic violence that trans Latinas experience." However, later that year they won a grant of $200,000 from the San Francisco Human Rights Commission.

== Work and its significance ==
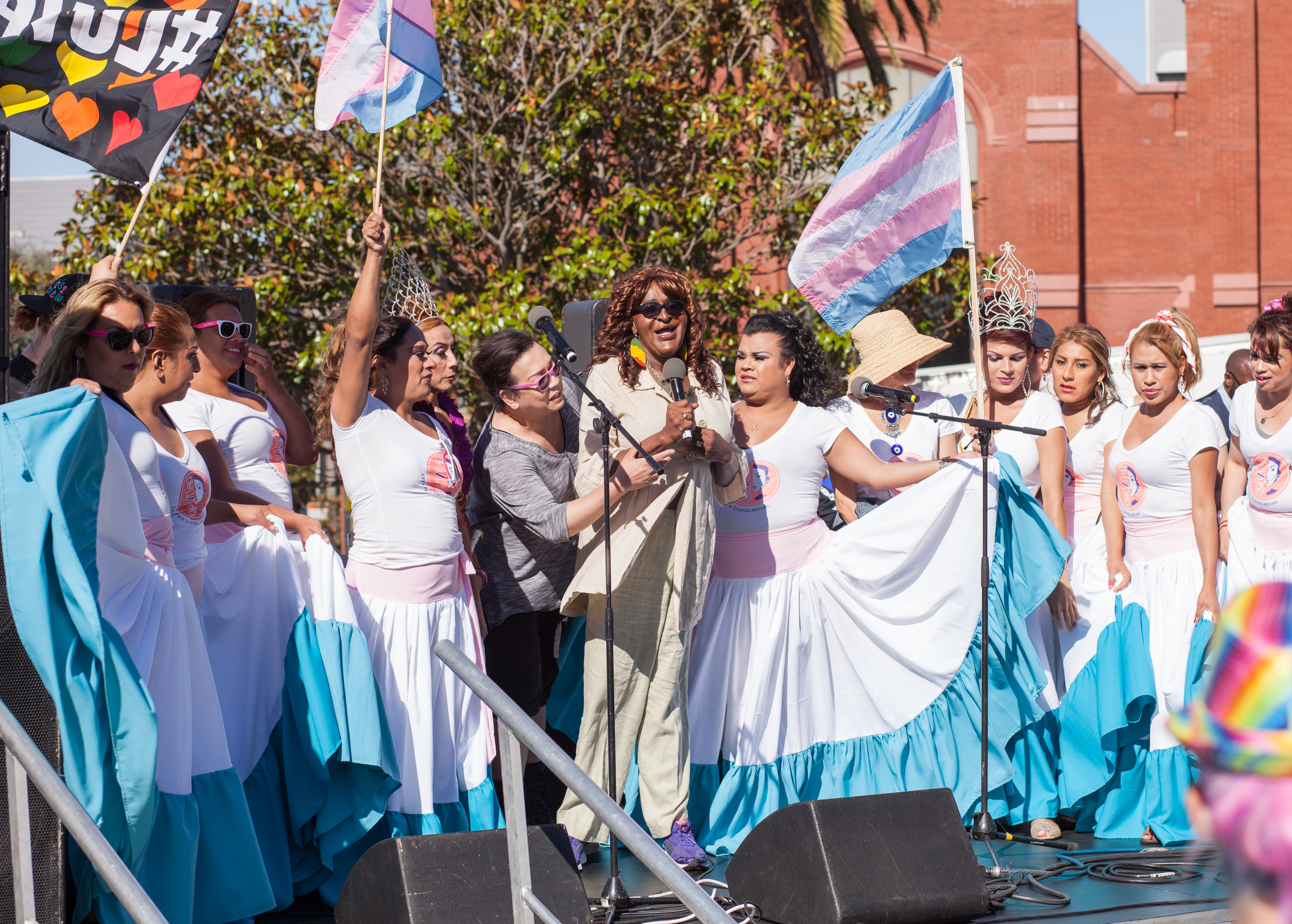
El/La Para TransLatinas joins Janetta Johnson on stage at the 2016 San Francisco Trans March.

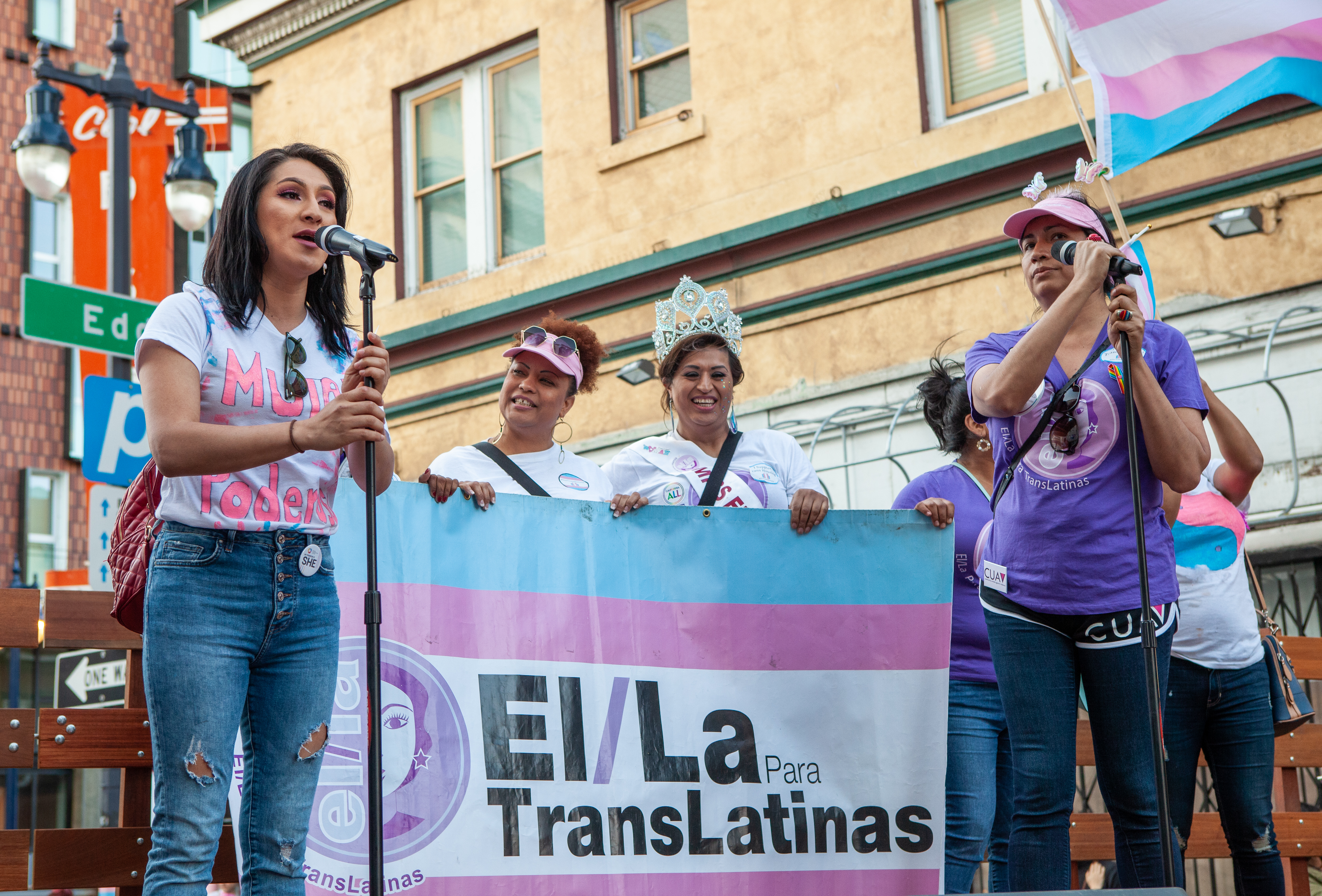
Members of El/La Para TransLatinas speak on a stage in the Compton's Transgender Cultural District, at the 2019 San Francisco Trans March.

El/La Para TransLatinas continues their HIV and AIDS prevention efforts and have collaborated with organizations like Native American AIDS Project and Mobilization against AIDS. El/La provides transgender Latinas with, "support and referrals for immigration, housing, name changes, and other services. Many of El/La's clients speak only Spanish and have sought asylum in the United States because of transphobic violence in their home countries – primarily Mexico, Central and South America, and the Caribbean." Many transgender Latinas are afraid to seek the authorities or any government resources because of their legal status and fear of facing more harassment. El/La aims to create a safe space where transgender Latinas "feel comfortable talking about any violent experiences and also case management."

They also provide anti-violence resources as their 2013 $200,000 grant was awarded to fund their anti-violence efforts. The organization planned on using this grant in order to train "luchadoras" fight against transphobic crimes and intimate partner violence.

In 2015, El/La fundraised money for the funeral of outreach coordination and transgender activist Joana Luna and created an altar in their office space for her.

On Friday June 26, 2015, El/La Para TransLatinas worked with the San Francisco Trans March for their 12th annual Trans March. Additionally the organization was featured in a news segment by the popular US-based Latino and Spanish TV channel, Univision on November 19, 2015. This marked a significant step as they were acknowledged as a legitimate organization by the conservative Latino community. A significant feature found within the organization's website is the presence of both English and Spanish in each individual section. This feature was highlighted within the article "Trans Latinas: You're not your mother's little boy anymore" from a Berkeley journalism article from UC Berkeley's Graduate School of Journalism, wherein the issue of a language barrier is brought up.

In 2023, El/La Para TransLatinas was engaged in a Community Based Participatory Research Project around Advance Care Planning, helping TransLatina elders discuss medical decision making and end of life care, issues that have specific impact for those who may have complicated relationships with families of origin.. The study concluded that after attending workshops, participants felt better informed and better able to communicate their wishes to those around them and advocate for their own needs.

== Nominations and awards ==
In 2017, El/La Para TransLatinas was nominated for the award Organization Grand Marshal which is recognized in San Francisco's Annual Pride Parade. This award nominates people and organizations that have made significant contributions in the LGBT community. The winner of the Organization Grand Marshal is selected by the public via online voting.

In 2013, El/La Para TransLatinas was recognized and awarded a $200,000 grant by the San Francisco Human Rights Commission for their anti-violence work.

In 2021, El/La Para TransLatinas received the Grassroots Leadership Award, as part of the 2021 Immigrant Leadership Awards presented by the San Francisco Immigrant Rights Commission.

In 2021, Nicole Santamaría, Executive Director of El/La Para TransLatinas, served as a 2021 San Francisco Pride Community Grand Marshal.
