= Marcia Ochoa =

United States-based academic

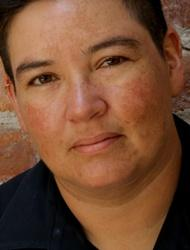
- Marcia Ochoa
- Born: 9 September 1970 (age 56)
- Known for: Latino Studies, Transgender studies, Queer theory, Ethnography, "Perverse Citizenship"

Academic background
- Education: Stanford University (Ph.D.)
- Doctoral advisor: Purnima Mankekar and Renato Rosaldo

Academic work
- Institutions: University of California, Santa Cruz Stanford University

Marcia Ochoa (born 9 September 1970) is a United States-based professor of Performance, Play and Design and Critical Race and Ethnic Studies at the University of California, Santa Cruz. They are the co-founder of El/La Para TransLatinas and are credited with popularizing the term "translatina."

== Life ==
Ochoa moved to San Francisco in 1994. They co-founded El/La Para TransLatinas in 2006 in San Francisco, California.

== Career ==
Ochoa completed their Ph.D. at Stanford University in Anthropology in 2005. They began teaching at the University of California, Santa Cruz in 2005, chaired the Feminist Studies department from 2014 to 2017, and currently serve as Provost of Oakes College. Ochoa is affiliated with Social Documentation, Anthropology, Latin American & Latino Studies, and Film and Digital Media at UC Santa Cruz.

Ochoa published their first book based on her dissertation, Queen for a Day: Transformistas, Beauty Queens and the Performance of Femininity in Venezuela, in 2014 through Duke University Press. It was nominated for a Lambda Literary Award. That same year, she co-edited the Transgender Studies Quarterly issue "Decolonizing the Transgender Imaginary". They were editor of GLQ: A Journal of Lesbian and Gay Studies from 2015-2021

Following the publication of Queen for a Day, Ochoa's work focused on early colonial violence in Latin America and translatina citizenship.
