= Songs for Eleonor =

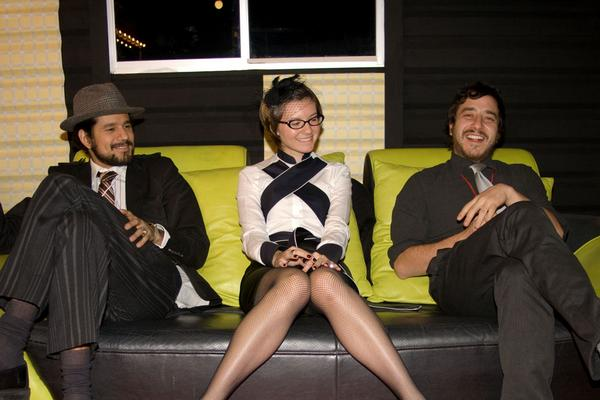
- Photograph taken during the release of their first album in 2008.

Background information
- Origin: Mexico City, Mexico
- Genres: Electropop
- Years active: 2005–present
- Label: Discos Tormento
- Members: Karen Ruiz Andrés Almeida Fausto Palma
- Website: songsforeleonor.com

Songs for Eleonor, or SFE, is an electropop, New Folk, Emotional Melody band founded in Mexico City. SFE was formed during the last months of 2005 by Karen Ruiz, of British Mother and Mexican father, and Andrés Almeida. Their first album Songs for Eleonor was released with the support of their Mexican based label Discos Tormento in December 2008.

== History ==
Songs for Eleonor was formed in Mexico City in 2005. The founding members were Karen Ruiz and Andrés Almeida. Karen Ruiz attended Emerson College where she studied Audio Production. After living in Los Angeles and Japan for a few years Karen went back to Mexico City and started to participate in different music projects such as Normal & Moodo and Metrika. She worked with Yamil Rezc as well and also participated in videos and did backup vocals for the Electro Rock band María Daniela y su Sonido Lasser and the punk singer Jessy Bulbo. On present day Ruiz has parallel to SFE an Electro Cumbia band called Sonido Desconocido II. Karen has also lent her voice for various cinematographic productions such as Moyana and Luna both finalists in the 25th Guadalajara International Film Festival; her voice also gave life to Moni a character in Mexican artist Pedro Reyes’ video installation called Baby Marx.

Andrés Almeida also has a parallel band named Sonido Trucha. Almeida is a musician and also an actor. He started his musical career when he was fourteen focusing mainly on percussion. When he turned eighteen he started to study “la tabla” with Arturo Rivera. As a musical producer he released two independent albums: Caleta Celestial and Natural Landscapes. Some of the tracks included in those albums where later included in the Electronic Latin Freaks compilation published by the Spanish label Subterfuge Records. In movies Andrés had his debut in 1997 and from then on he continuously appeared on different film productions some of which were Y tu mamá también, Cabecitas and 40 días. In television he was part of the Terminales and Los Simuladores series’ cast.

In 2007 the band was joined by Mexican native Fausto Palma. Fausto started his musical career when he was fifteen; he studied classical guitar. At twenty one Fausto travelled to Holland and India to study Hindi classical music with the Sarangi. He also studied the Oud in Cairo's opera in Egypt. In 2004 he returned to Mexico and founded the band Petra (which has released four albums). Simultaneously he formed the band Ghazali. Between 1998 and 2003 Fausto and Andrés collaborated in different musical projects.

Since the beginning of 2010 there have been two additional guests: drummer Rodrigo Barbosa (also drummer of Paté de Fuá and Los Dorados) and bassist Rodrigo Valenzuela, former Aguakate's band member.

Songs for Eleonor has performed live in different music festivals such as Mutek 2007, SXSW 2009 and Festival de Música Diego Rivera 2009. Likewise they have shared stages with bands like Mercury Rev, Ulrich Schnauss, Circlesquare, Tijuko, Noriko and Natalia Lafourcade. In May 2010 they played as the opening band for the Beach House concert that took place in the Lunario in Mexico City; in November 2010 they also opened for Architecture in Helsinki, concert which took place in Plaza Condesa in Mexico City.

In 2010 Songs for Eleonor was nominated, thanks to their EP Casi, to best album Dance / Electro in the fourth edition of the Indie-O Music Awards. During the ceremony Karen Ruiz performed, along with Carla Morrison (who substituted Natalia Lafourcade), Juan Manuel Torreblanca and Andrea Balency among others, the closing act in which they made a tribute to different Mexican musicians.

== Discography ==
=== Albums ===
- Songs for Eleonor (2008)

=== EPs ===
- Something About You (2009)
- CASI (2010)

=== Singles ===
- Soplo del Mar (2012)
- Tienes Miedo (2010)

== Videos ==
- Soplo del Mar (2012). Directed y edited by Leonel Fernández. Photography: Leonel Fernández y Alex Fenton
- Plant a Seed (2010). Video directed by Azul Violeta Bermejo.
- Tell Me (2010). Video directed by Azul Violeta Bermejo.
- Something About You (2009). Video directed by Iván Krassoievitch and Gisselle Elias Karam.
- I Think I'm in Love (2008). Director: Leandro Cordova Lucas. Photography: Herbert Sebastian Hofmann.
- Cross My Heart (2008). Video directed by Gisselle Elias Karam.
