= Juan Sebastián Lach Lau =

Mexican composer

Juan Sebastián Lach Lau (born October 3, 1970 in Mexico City) is a Mexican composer of classical, microtonal and electroacoustic works.

He has played keyboards and piano in jazz and rock bands in Mexico. He is perhaps best known as one of the members of the progressive Guadalajara-based band Santa Sabina. Since 2001 he has lived and studied in the Netherlands, obtaining a Bachelor's (2003) and Master's (2005) Degree in Composition at the Royal Conservatory of The Hague under the guidance of Clarence Barlow and Gilius van Bergeijk. Currently he is following a PhD in Artistic Research from Leiden University in association with Orpheus Institute in Gent, Belgium under the guidance of Clarence Barlow and Louis Andriessen.

He has written chamber music for a diverse combination of instruments with and without electronics. His music has been premiered in Mexico, Netherlands, Ireland, England, United States, Germany and Spain among others. He also participates as part of an improvisers ensemble based in The Hague playing piano and analog electronics.
