= Shelly Grabe =

Social psychologist

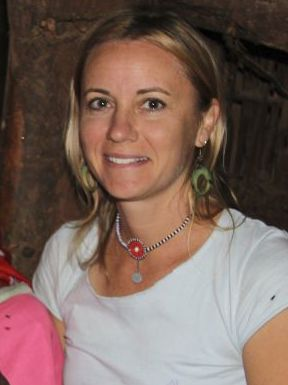
- Grabe in 2013
- Born: 1974 (age 51–52)
- Education: University of Missouri-Columbia
- Scientific career
- Thesis: Body image dissatisfaction and women's HIV-related sexual risk taking : the mediating roles of negative affect and sex motives in a longitudinal community sample (2004)

Shelly Grabe (born 1974) is a professor in social psychology at the University of California, Santa Cruz, where she has affiliations with women's studies and Latin American and Latino studies. Her research involves women's human rights and globalization and the international attention given to women's empowerment.

== Education and career ==
Grabe has a BA from the Michigan State University. She then moved to the University of Missouri where she earned a PhD in psychology in 2004. She also finished a clinical residency at the University of Washington School of Medicine in 2004. She received an NIH post-doc award to study at the University of Wisconsin from 2004 to 2006 and subsequently was a visiting scholar from 2006 to 2008 when she began her research in Nicaragua. In 2008, Grabe joined the faculty at the University of California, Santa Cruz.

== Research ==
Grabe is known for her work on women's rights and women's empowerment. While at the University of Wisconsin, she worked on women's body objectification and demonstrated that the objectification of women's bodies is deeply embedded in socio-cultural world views and intersects with race/ethnicity, research which has been covered by the media. Her subsequent research relied on relationships with the women's social movement in Nicaragua (Movimiento Autónomo de Mujeres) where she examined social inequities or male dominance in a cross-cultural and interdisciplinary context

In 2014, she was invited to deliver a talk at the United Nations Commission on the Status of Women on gendered structural inequities and social justice. In 2015, she was invited to deliver a keynote address at the American Psychological Association convention in Toronto titled, “Gender (in)justice in a transnational, globalized context: What’s psychology have to do with it?”

Her 2017 book, Narrating a Psychology of Resistance: Voices of the Compañeras in Nicaragua, offers a critical perspective on how the intersections of patriarchy and neoliberalism threaten women's human rights and democratic participation in society.

Her edited collection, Women's Human Rights: A Social Psychological Perspective on Resistance, Liberation, and Justice, was published in 2018.

== Selected publications ==
- Grabe, Shelly; Ward, L. Monique; Hyde, Janet Shibley (2008). "The role of the media in body image concerns among women: A meta-analysis of experimental and correlational studies". Psychological Bulletin. 134 (3): 460–476. doi:10.1037/0033-2909.134.3.460. ISSN 1939-1455. PMID 18444705.
- Grabe, Shelly; Hyde, Janet Shibley (2006). "Ethnicity and body dissatisfaction among women in the United States: A meta-analysis". Psychological Bulletin. 132 (4): 622–640. doi:10.1037/0033-2909.132.4.622. ISSN 1939-1455. PMID 16822170.
- Gentile, Brittany; Grabe, Shelly; Dolan-Pascoe, Brenda; Twenge, Jean M.; Wells, Brooke E.; Maitino, Alissa (March 1, 2009). "Gender Differences in Domain-Specific Self-Esteem: A Meta-Analysis". Review of General Psychology. 13 (1): 34–45. doi:10.1037/a0013689. ISSN 1089-2680. S2CID 43274357.
- Grabe, Shelly; Hyde, Janet Shibley; Lindberg, Sara M. (June 1, 2007). "Body Objectification and Depression in Adolescents: The Role of Gender, Shame, and Rumination". Psychology of Women Quarterly. 31 (2): 164–175. doi:10.1111/j.1471-6402.2007.00350.x. ISSN 0361-6843. S2CID 35808104.
- Lindberg, Sara M.; Grabe, Shelly; Hyde, Janet Shibley (2007). "Gender, Pubertal Development, and Peer Sexual Harassment Predict Objectified Body Consciousness in Early Adolescence". Journal of Research on Adolescence. 17 (4): 723–742. doi:10.1111/j.1532-7795.2007.00544.x. ISSN 1532-7795.

== Awards and honors ==
In 2015, Grabe received the Georgia Babladelis Best paper award from the American Psychological Association for her paper on land ownership by women. She also received the 2015 Denmark-Reuder Award from the American Psychological Association.
