= Jack Baskin =

American philanthropist, engineer, and businessman (1919–2020)

- Born: September 20, 1919; Upstate New York
- Died: January 12, 2020 (aged 100); Carmel-by-the-Sea, California
- Spouse: Peggy Downes Baskin

Jack Baskin (September 20, 1919 – January 12, 2020) was an American philanthropist, engineer, and businessman in California, especially near Silicon Valley. He was the founder of the Jack Baskin School of Engineering at the University of California, Santa Cruz, one of the founding members of the Community Foundation of Santa Cruz, and director of the Peggy & Jack Baskin Foundation with his wife, Peggy Downes Baskin.

== Early life ==
Baskin was born in September 1919 in upstate New York and was the son of a watchmaker who immigrated from Russia with his wife to the United States in 1908. For his early education, Baskin attended school in a one-room schoolhouse through the eighth grade with 30 other students. When it came time for Baskin to seek a college education, it was in the midst of the Great Depression, and so his family worked to save money to pay for his tuition. He would eventually study mechanical engineering at the University of Colorado, the first in his family to have a college education. Afterward, Baskin pursued his Bachelor of Science degree at New York University, earning the degree in 1940.

Following college, Baskin entered his first job in engineering, being paid $28 per week, today being valued at around almost $500, or $70 per day. During this same period, Baskin served as an aeronautical engineer in World War II. Three years after the war in 1948, he moved west and earned his California Professional Engineers License, eventually becoming a general contractor in Southern California, especially in the newly-popular suburbs of Los Angeles. Baskin would go on from there to work in engineering, real estate, and philanthropy, eventually settling in Santa Cruz, California, where he lived until his death.

== Career ==
Originally, Baskin moved to Los Angeles to pursue contracting, as well as working near Orange County. Baskin created and was president of Jack Baskin, Inc. (incorporated in 1948) which became one of the five property management firms approved by both the United States Department of Housing and Urban Development and the California Housing Finance Agency. Baskin's roots in real estate date back to the 1950s, when he built small residential projects in El Segundo with $5,000 in venture capital. After building seven schools for the Los Angeles Unified School District, Jack Baskin, Inc. built houses in Los Angeles and Orange County. Baskin also built his own home during this period in Brentwood.

Eventually, the offices of Jack Baskin, Inc. were moved to the San Francisco Bay Area when the company entered into an agreement with the City of Vallejo Redevelopment Agency to build 600 apartments for low-income families. This project included the construction of the 14-story Marina Tower. The tower housed the headquarters of Jack Baskin, Inc. until its closing in 1999. In 1967, Baskin worked in Palo Alto in order to construct a 300-unit development for cooperative housing in San Francisco's Western Addition, the San Lorenzo Park Apartments, and Watsonville's Independence Square.

In 1999, due to Baskin's own retirement, Baskin, Inc. was dissolved and its offices closed after operating for 50 years. Baskin's remaining real estate holdings were transferred to the Baskin Family Trust where they are still today, managed by SAR Asset Management, Inc. in Aptos. Since this time, Jack and his wife Peggy Downes Baskin have lived in Santa Cruz. In 2006, he was inducted into the Silicon Valley Engineering Hall of Fame.

== Philanthropy ==
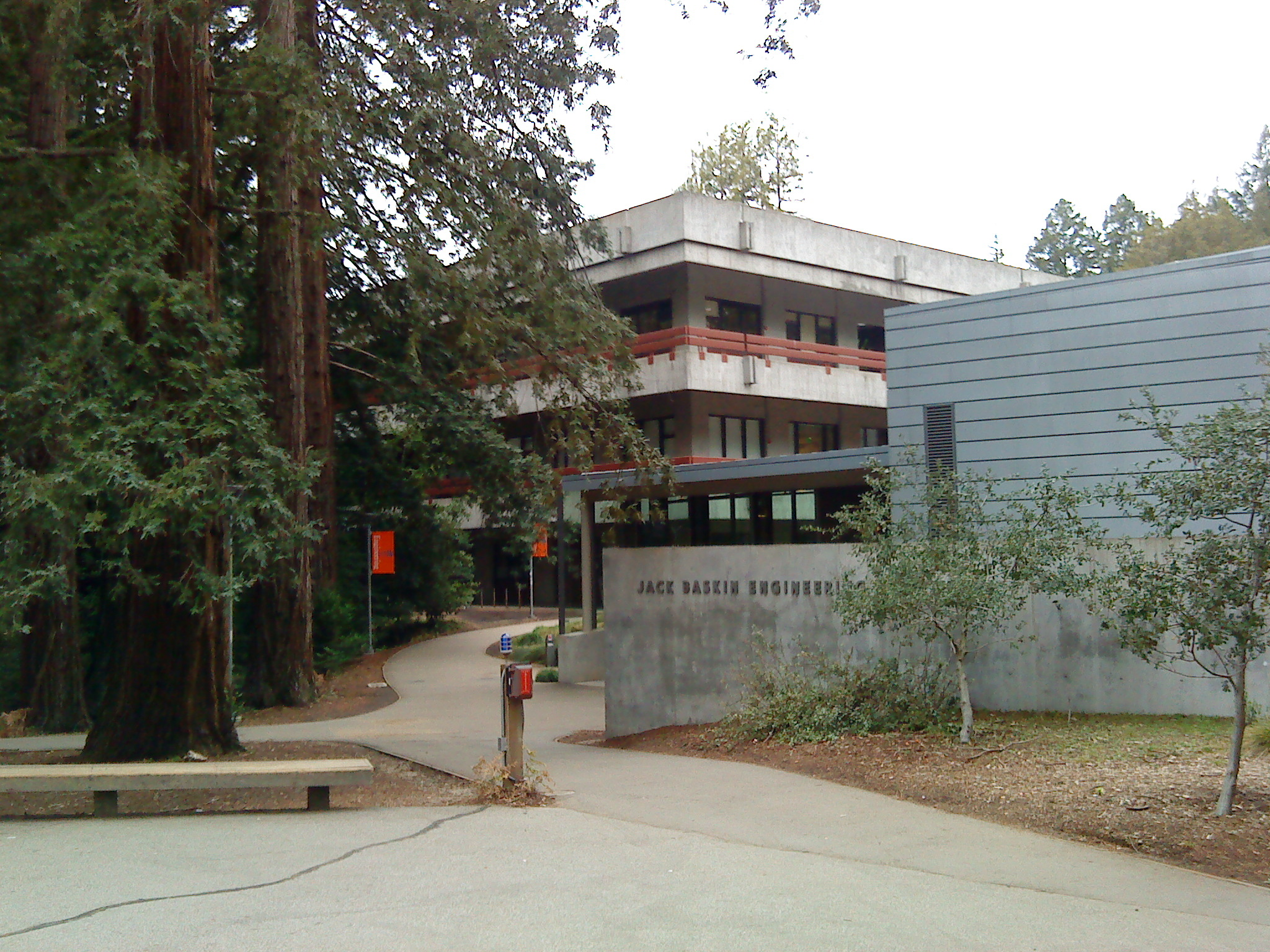
Jack Baskin School of Engineering at the University of California, Santa Cruz is named in his honor.

Baskin's charities include various local Santa Cruz establishments such as the Dominican Hospital of Santa Cruz, Cabrillo College, Seymour Marine Laboratory, and the University of California, Santa Cruz. In 1997, he established a grant of $5 million used to build the Jack Baskin School of Engineering which opened in 1999. Additional grants of $500,000 in 2002 and $1 million in 2003 bring his current total contributions to the Jack Baskin School of Engineering to over $8 million. These donations helped to finance programs for computer engineering, the arts, the Institute of Marine Sciences, Shakespeare Santa Cruz, an endowed chair in psychology, and scholarships in literature. Baskin also served as chair of the UC Santa Cruz Foundation for two years and remained a trustee.

Baskin was a director emeritus of the Community Foundation of Santa Cruz, as well as one of its founding members. In 2006, he pledged $1.25 million to the Foundation in order to acquire a site in Aptos where their headquarters would be built. Once the headquarters was completed in 2010, it was named the Jack & Peggy Baskin Center for Philanthropy, in honor of its donors. In January 2008, the Baskins also established the Peggy & Jack Baskin Foundation, initially funded with their gift of $2 million.
