= La Reverte =

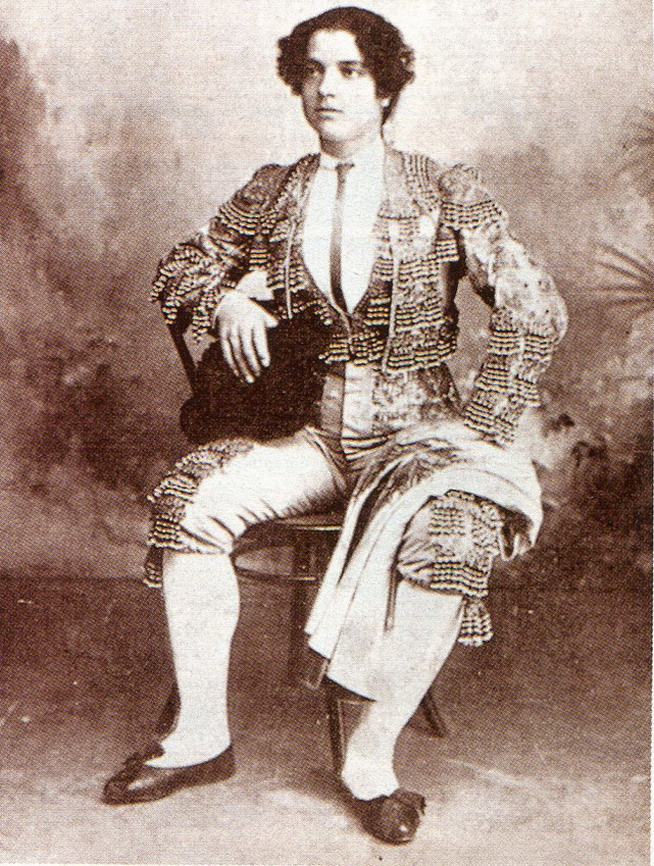
Rodríguez in matador attire

Agustín Rodríguez Tripiana (Senés, Almería, 28 August 1878 – Vilches, Jaén, June 1945), known as La Reverte, was a bullfighter who gained some relevance at the beginning of the 20th century, first by fighting on women's circuit, and then men's, after starting to socially function as a man.

== Early life ==
Born in the village of Senés, Almería, in 1878, Rodríguez was assigned female at birth and from a young age stood out for great strength and lack of grace, earning the nickname "La Marimacho" (The Tomboy). Inspired by the exploits of Las Noyas, he decided to dedicate himself to the world of bullfighting as a matador. The parish and municipal archives were destroyed in the Civil War, which is why it has not been possible to verify it exactly, however the chroniclers do agree that as a child Rodríguez worked for his parrents in the mines of La Carolina and Arquillos (province of Jaén).

== Career ==
=== Women's bullfighting ===
Rodríguez was dazzled seeing the female bullfighter La Fragosa (Guillena, Seville, 1886) perform in the square of his town, deciding then with accelerated learning to begin the novillero career under the orders of a banderillero from Cordoba as a nine year old. On an unknown date in the year 1888 he debuted under the guidance of the then emerging bullfighters Machaquito and Lagartijo Chico, making a name for himself in the bullrings of Zaragoza, Madrid, Granada, Valencia, Murcia, or the Lisbon bullring (La Joseilla and La Pepita) where he enjoyed great popularity.

The nickname "la Reverte" was inspired by the bullfighter Antonio Reverte, inventor of the "revertina" and the "telephone" maneuvers and very popular even in the songs of the time.

In 1900, he appeared fighting young bulls in Bilbao at a women's bullfight, sharing the bill with La Guerrita. His success at that event led him to Madrid, where he had one of his most triumphant afternoons and, consequently, a significant presence on the posters that year (even sharing the bill with bullfighters of the caliber of Lagartijo and Machaquito) and received positive reviews in the press of the time. In January 1899, the bullfighting critic El Enano commented: "La Reverte was brave, but I'm not in favor of feminism in bullfighting.". La Correspondencia de España added in November 1900: "She is very brave and very dark-skinned, she fights bulls, places banderillas, kills, and jumps the barrier like a man. She has a lot of determination, but nothing more."

=== Men's bullfighting ===
After more than twelve seasons and more than five hundred fighting bulls killed, the situation of La Reverte changed. In July 1908, conservative minister Juan de la Cierva y Peñafiel established the ban on women bullfighting, inspired especially by La Reverte's fame. Rodríguez was scheduled to appear in the Tetuán de las Victorias bullring in Madrid, but the bullfight was suspended by government order due to the presence of female participants.

Rodríguez appealed right to continue practicing bullfighting to court: "Let Mr. De la Cierva give me a man's credential and I will continue bullfighting as men do, for I am as capable as anyone." After the appeal was unsuccessful, La Reverte publicly claimed to have been assigned male at birth and baptized as Agustín Rodríguez. A sympathetic doctor signed a note confirming it. Agustin received his first male contract in Madrid in 1909, and continued fighting for several seasons, sometimes being called La Reverte, sometimes El Reverte, and sometimes even Lo Reverte.

Rodriguez retired from bullfighting aged 34, moving back near his hometown and working at a mine. He used exclusively masculine pronouns and the name Agustin even off the ring. in 1934, he returned to bullfighting for a few games before a permanent retirement.

== Controversy ==
There is some controversy regarding La Reverte's identity, with frequent misinformation that he was a cisgender man pretending to be a woman. While some sources claim coming out as a man was a ploy to circumvent the sports prohibition, others believe that it was a case of transgender identity expressed even outside of the ring, possibly also intersex.

== Death and legacy ==
He died working as a guard on an estate in Vilches in 1945, "always dressed as a man, in trousers, chaps and a sash, and with a shotgun in hand."

In 1962, ABC remembered him as "the most singular and extraordinary character to have ever graced the Spanish bullrings" and published an article through its chronicler Francisco Rodríguez Batllori: "Her caricatured and absurd life had a certain legendary air and has gone down in the history of bullfighting as something extraordinary and unheard of. Her efforts to fight more and better bulls were in vain, since the shortcomings that the public had tolerated in María Salomé were not, however, forgiven in Agustín Rodríguez (...)".
