= Arturo Meza =

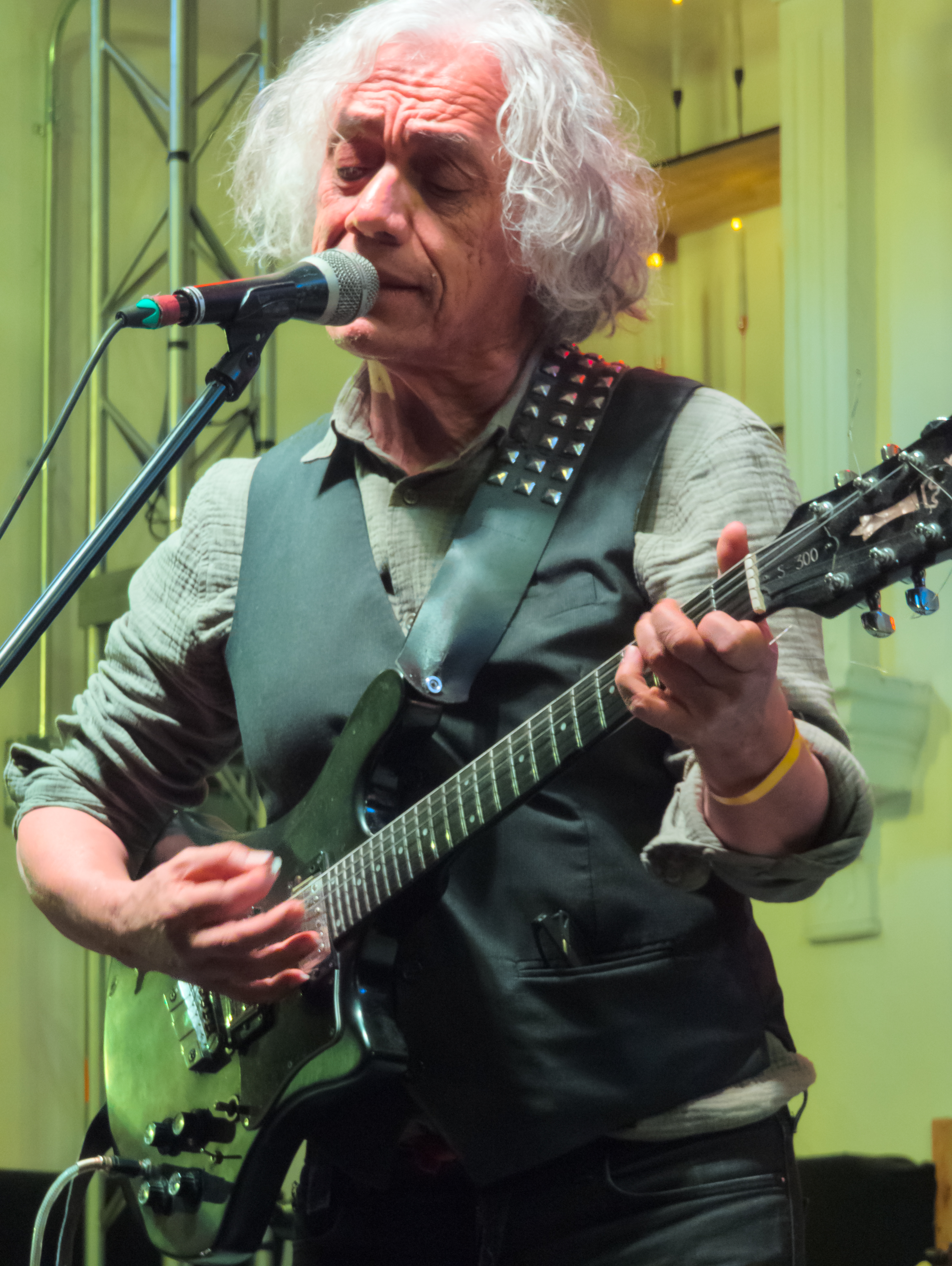
- After a concert in Mexico City, 2025.

Background information
- Also known as: Meza, El Meza
- Born: Arturo Meza; December 12, 1956 (age 69); Tocumbo, Michoacán, Mexico
- Genres: Folk, rock, blues, Progressive music
- Occupations: Singer-songwriter, author, poet, artist, producer
- Instruments: Vocals, guitar, bass guitar, harmonica, keyboards, percussion, arp, harmonium, fretless
- Years active: 1977–present
- Label: Gente de México
- Website: www.arturomeza.com

Arturo Meza (Tocumbo, Michoacán, December 12, 1956) is a Mexican songwriter, musician, composer, singer, poet and writer. He is a prolific artist and inventor of musical instruments, such as the teclaedro, yeloguerlizet, mezáfono and oglio. The base of his songs is folk music, usually only his own voice and guitar. Meza is an independent and prolific artist, and has published 32 albums, always removed from the musical mainstream. He is one of the most accomplished independent composers in Mexico.

== Works ==
Meza has released 37 albums, with more than 300 songs:

- No vayamos a irnos sin el mar (Let's not go without the sea) (Gente de México, 1984)
- In principio (In the beginning) (Gente de México, 1984)
- Suite Koradi (Koradi Suite) (Gente de México, 1985)
- Sin título (Untitled) (Gente de México, 1987)
- Requiem (Gente de México, 1988)
- Ayunando entre las ruinas (Fasting in the ruins) (Gente de México, 1988)
- Setenta centavos (Seventy cents) (Gente de México, 1989)
- Para un compa (For a friend) (Gente de México, 1990)
- Crónica sonora (Sound chronicle) (Gente de México, 1990)
- En el monte de los equinoccios (In the Equinox mount)(Gente de México, 1991)
- Venadito del sol – Hikuri (Deer of the sun – Hikuri) (Instituto de Investigaciones Estéticas, UNAM, 1993)
- A la siniestra del Padre (At the left of Father) (Gente de México, 1992)
- La Balada de Galaver (Gallaver's ballad) (Gente de México, 1993)
- La sangre de los ángeles (The blood of angels) (Gente de México, 1995)
- Setenta centavos para un compa (Seventy cents for a friend) (Rock and roll Circus, 1995)
- Descalzos al paraíso (Barefoot to paradise) (Gente de México, 1996)
- Criando cuervos (Raising crows) (Independiente, 1996)
- Canciones para cantar en el infierno, volumen 1 (Songs to sing in the hell) (FCM Música 1998)
- Borges: homenaje en el centenario de su natalicio (Borges: tribute in his centenary) (Gente de México / Fundación Jorge Luis Borges Argentina, 1999)
- Némesis (Dime Abuelita Records / Gente de México, 1999)
- El 33 de este mes (The 33 of this month) (Gente de México, 2001)
- Canciones para cantar en el infierno 2 (Songs to sing in the hell 2) (Gente de México, 2001)
- Merlin Soy Arturo, La espina de su amor, Ella, La mar (Merlin, I'm Arturo, the prickle of his love, she, the sea) (Gente de México, 2002)
- De tin marin (Gente de México, 2003)
- De do pingüé (Gente de México, 2003)
- Amor y paz (Peace and love) (Gente de México, 2004)
- Qkramakra (Gente de México, Cúcara mácara)(2005)
- Planeta miedo (Planet Fear) (Gente de México, 2005)
- Fin (End) (2006)
- La música escarlata (The scarlet music) (Gente de México, 2007)
- NOD (Gente de México, 2008)
- NTN (Gente de México, 2010)
- De Pié (Gente de México, 2013)
- Ni Serpientes Ni Escaleras (Gente de México, 2016)
- Esencial (Gente de México, 2018)
- El Toro Cool (Gente de México, 2018)
- Constelaciones (Gente de México, 2020)

Also, he musicalized texts of François Villon, Rubén Darío, Jorge Luis Borges, Denise Levertov, Nezahualcoyotl, Boanergés de Magdaló, Luis G. Franco, William Blake, Mario Santiago Papasquiaro, Margarito Cuéllar, José Eugenio Sánchez, Arnulfo Vigil, Rey Bohindra, Charly Garcia and Josefa Rosalía Luque.

=== Books ===
- Ansina como endenantes (Oficio Ediciones, 1993)
- El diablero (Gente de México, 1995)
- Historias de agua (1998)
- Dord (Gente de México, 2003)
- Juan Matilde (Gente de México, 2005)
- Planetamor (Gente de México, 2005)
- Dándole de tragar al Diablo (Gente de México, 2005)
- Cartapacio del Infierno. El evangelio de Maria Magdalena (Gente de México, 2007)
- El Círculo del Fuego Negro (Gente de México, 2008)
- Nidodecuervos (Gente de México, 2008)
- Exiliados Celestes (Gente de México, 2009)
- Essameriam (Gente de México, 2009)
- Viajero del infinito (Gente de México, 2010)
- El Otro Mesías (Gente de México, 2010)
- Los mensajes de Fátima (Gente de México, 2011)
- Laberinto de sombras (Gente de México, 2011)
- Los Buñuelados de Olvidel (Gente de México, 2013)
- 69 de agosto (Gente de México, 2014)
- El Santo nunca pierde (Gente de México, 2015)
- The End (Gente de México, 2015)
- El viaje de Saramago (Gente de México, 2017)
- Falso Film (Gente de México, 2018)
- Eisenberg sin H (Gente de México, 2018)
- Otilio Bernabé (Gente de México, 2018)
- Poesía Put@ (Gente de México, 2018)
- La cruz del infante Pedro (Gente de México, 2019)
- Tesla (Gente de México, 2019)
- Caminando en el viento (Gente de México, 2020)
- Haqueldama (Gente de México, 2020)
- El cadáver del alma (Gente de México, 2021)
- Lobo flor de puerco (Gente de México, 2022)
- Maquiaverlo para creerlo (Gente de México, 2022)
- La fosa séptica del infierno (Gente de México, 2022)

=== Poetry ===
- Epistolario de Olimaconet de Luvián (1980)
- Canto Ersal (1992)

=== Edición Especial ===
- Paquete Festejando el 40 Aniversario de Arturo Meza (Gente de México, 2015)
