= University of the Cloister of Sor Juana =

Private university in Mexico City

Coordinates: 19°25′36.96″N 99°8′12.11″W

- Universidad del Claustro de Sor Juana
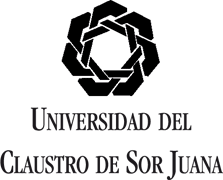
- Motto: Saber para valorar. Valorar para elegir.
- Motto in English: To know in order to value. To value in order to choose.
- Type: Private
- Established: 1979
- Rector: Carmen Beatriz López Portillo
- Undergraduates: 1,582
- Postgraduates: 39
- Location: Mexico City, Mexico
- Campus: Former cloister of Sor Juana de la Cruz
- Website: Official website

The University of the Cloister of Sor Juana (Spanish: Universidad del Claustro de Sor Juana) is a private university located in the former San Jerónimo Convent in the historic center of Mexico City. This convent is best known for having been the home of Sor Juana Inés de la Cruz for over twenty five years, she produced many of her writings here. After the convent was closed in the 19th century, the large complex was divided and was home to a number of institutions and businesses, including a large dance hall in the mid 20th century. In the 1970s, the government expropriated the complex, explored it and began the restoration process. In 1979, the current university was founded at this site and it is currently the benefactor and guardian of the complex. The institution offers bachelors, two masters and two certificates, mostly in the humanities. The institution also sponsors or co-sponsors a number of cultural and educational activities, mostly situated in the historic center of the city.

== The cloister complex ==
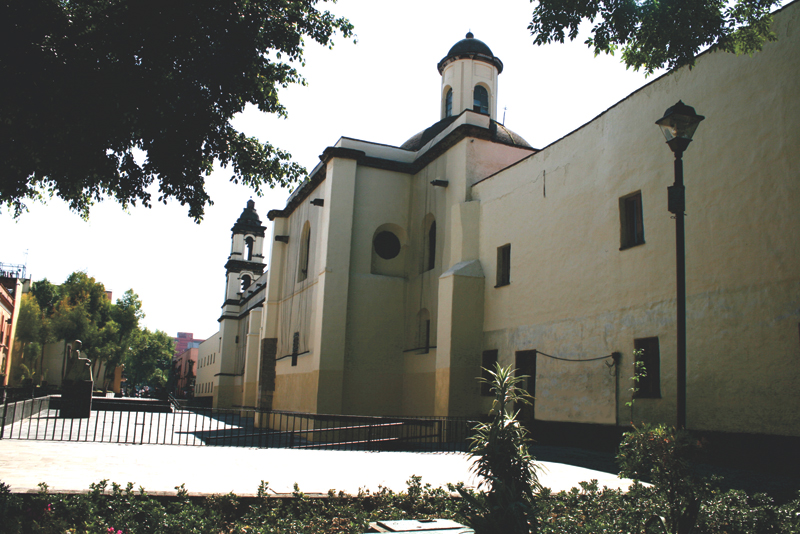
Universidad del Claustro de Sor Juana

The cloister was founded in 1585 by Isabel de Barrios, the daughter of conquistador Andrés de Barrios. The convent was formed by the joining of two private residences, that is Alonso Ortiz (now at the extreme northeast of the Grand Claustro) and of Isabel de Barrios (at the extreme north east of the Patio de la Fundación). The two were joined then amplified by Isabel de Guevara. The complex became the home of four nuns from the Convent of La Concepción with authorization granted by archbishop Pedro Moya de Contreras as the first convents of nuns of the Saint Jerome order.

The church was built in Renaissance style with Herrerian influence and consecrated in 1623. Its columns and pilasters are Doric and bear pyramidal crests. The tower dates from 1665, but despite being built during the Baroque period, the tower is unadorned. Its circular dome rests on pendentives, of a design invented by Alonos Perez de Castaneda for the Jesus Maria Church. The sculpture of Saint Hieronymite on the second body is the second oldest stone sculpture of the colonial period. The convent here was originally named for Saint Paula.

Over the years, the convent underwent many changes as the number of cells (bedrooms) increased, along with corresponding services such as servants' quarters, a living room and expanded kitchen, until it reached the dimensions it has now.

This convent is best known for having been the home of Sor Juana Inés de la Cruz for over 27 years. The tombstone that supposedly covers her grave in the lower choir is more of a tribute than a real grave. The nun, called the "Tenth Muse" in Mexico, wrote most of her works here.

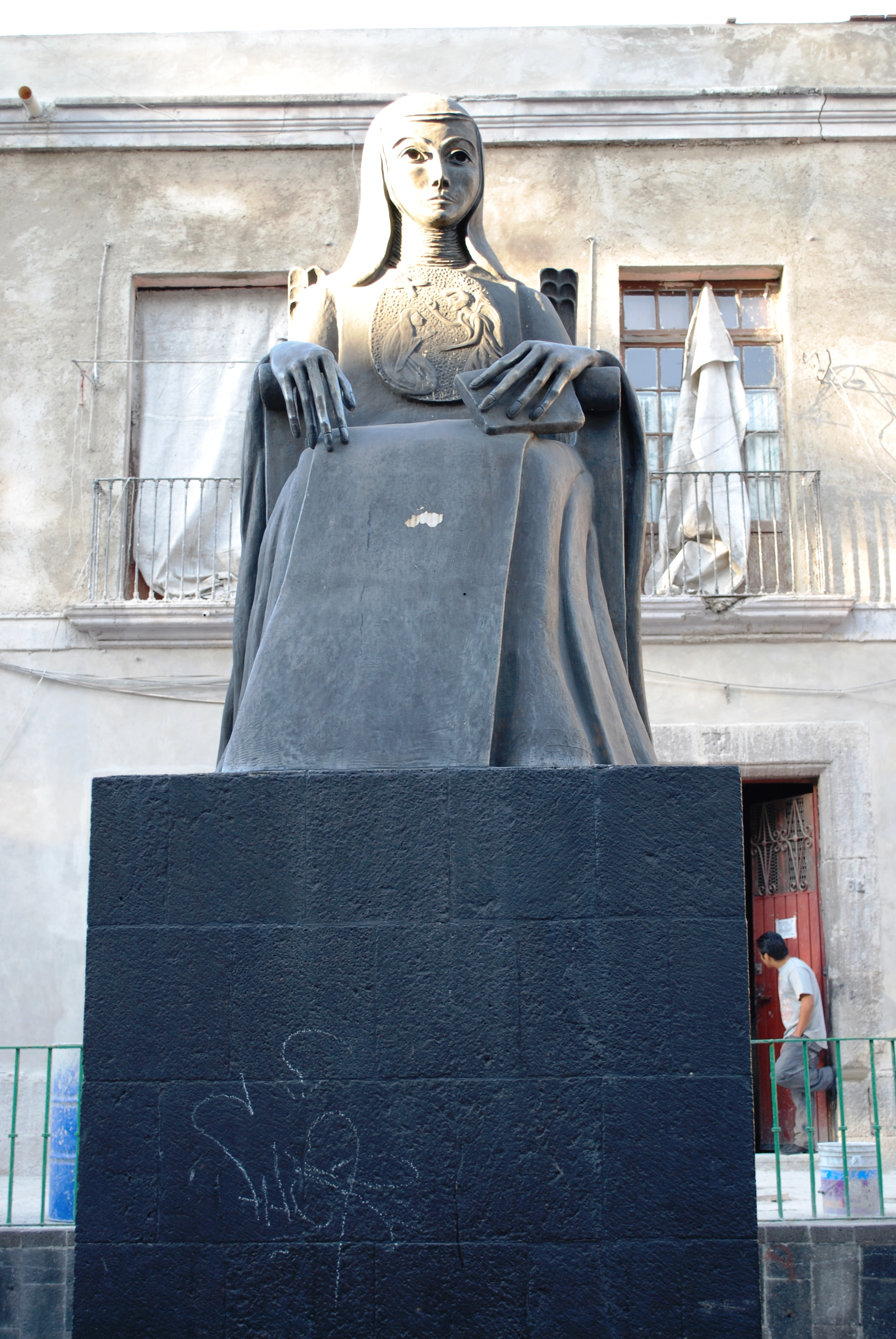
Statue of Sor Juana at the university

In 1867, due to the Reform Laws, the convent was closed. The building was converted into a camp and military hospital. After that, the main patio was put to various uses such as the site of the Literary Society of Nezahualcoyotl. By the beginning of the 20th century, it was used as payment to architect Antonio Rivas Mercado, with his daughters Antonieta and Alicia inheriting it in 1927. The church became property of the state and was declared a national monument. The rest of the property was divided among several owners with some of the complex having office buildings constructed on it. The best known business to be on this site was the Smyrna Dancing Club, which operated in the mid 20th century.

In 1975, a group dedicated to the studies of Sor Juana petition President Luis Echeverría to expropriate the building in order to conserve it. Under presidential decree, the complex was excavated and explored between 1976 and 1982, involving anthropologists, archeologists, architects, historians and others with the purpose of restoration. Many of the finds are objects related to the daily lives of the nuns that used to live here such as tiles, fountains, drainage systems and water collectors as well as tombs. Today the university is in charge of the complex's conservation. It is considered a "Patrimonio de la Nación" (National Heritage Site) and is featured on the back of a 200 peso bill.

In the mid 2000s, the Catholic Church tried to reclaim the Church of San Jeronimo to return it to worship. However, the school resisted these efforts and eventually won in court. The university maintains the rights to the entire property as long as it remains an educational and cultural institution.

== The educational institution ==
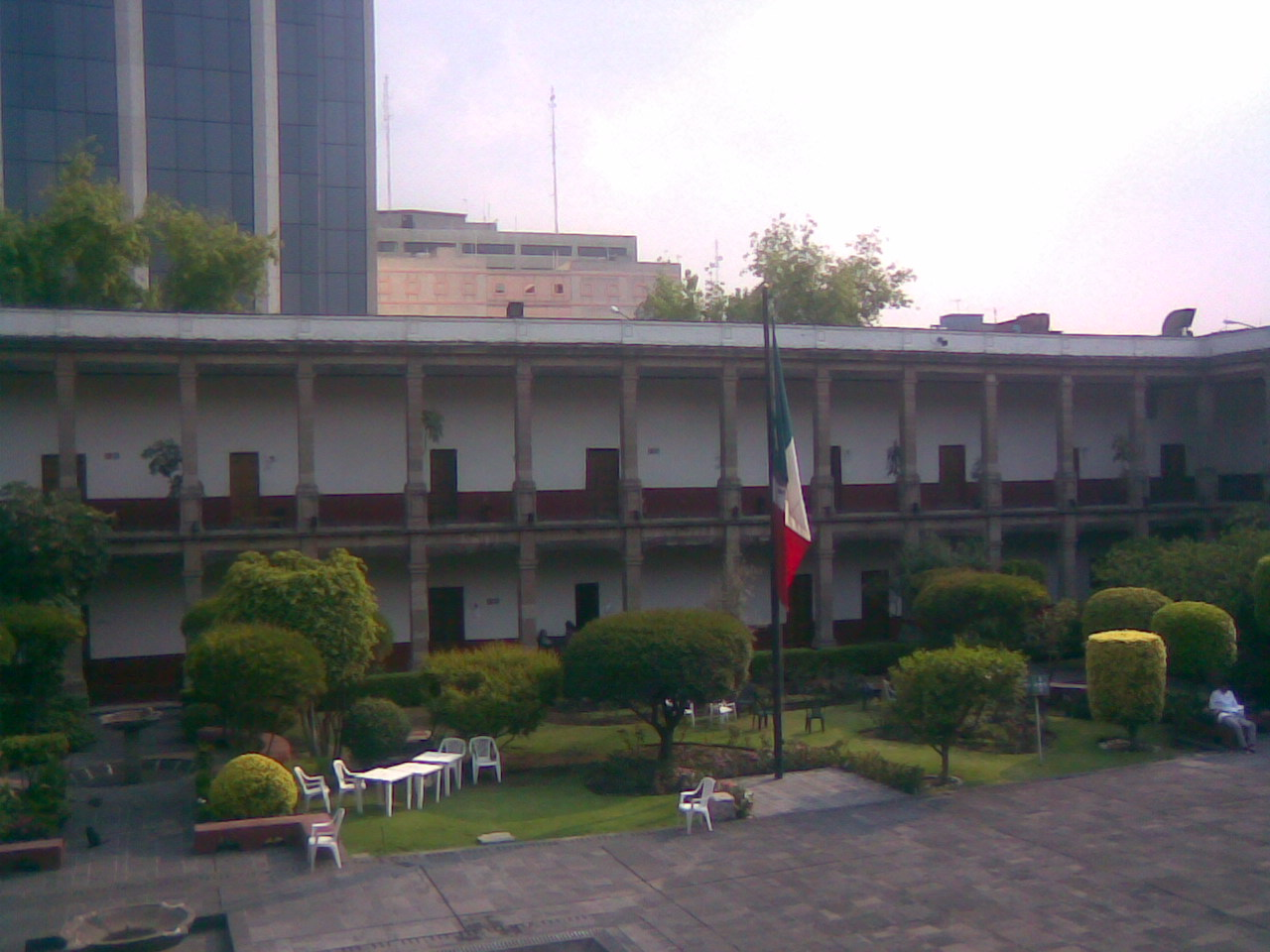
The courtyard of the Gran Claustro

The Universidad del Claustro de Sor Juana was founded here in 1979, offering its first bachelors in "Human Sciences" (Ciencias Humanas) . Today, the institution offers eight in Art, Audiovisual Communication, Study and Promotion of Culture, Philosophy, Gastronomy, Humanities, Creative Writing and Literature, and Psychology. It offers master's degrees in Mexico Colonial Culture and Food and Beverage Business Administration and certificates in Food and Beverage Business Administration and Theatrical Production. Approximately 75 to 80% of graduates find work in the fields they study. The most successful of these programs is gastronomy The life and work of Sor Juana forms the intellectual basis and the identity of the institution. The building's interior has been remodeled as a mix of colonial and modern constructions, with conservation efforts being continuous. The campus expanded in 2003, with the addition of nearby Regina campus, which was part of the colonial convent of the nuns of Regina Coeli. This campus contains Neoclassical constructions done by Manuel Tolsá for the Marquesa of Selva Nevada.

The library of the institution contains the Centro de Documentación Sor Juana Inés de la Cruz, which aims to become the most important repository of writings about the nun and her life. Many of the works here are from the beginning of the 20th century. The Center contains both books and periodicals about both the woman and her writings. The general library collection contains a large number of first editions, most of which were donated.

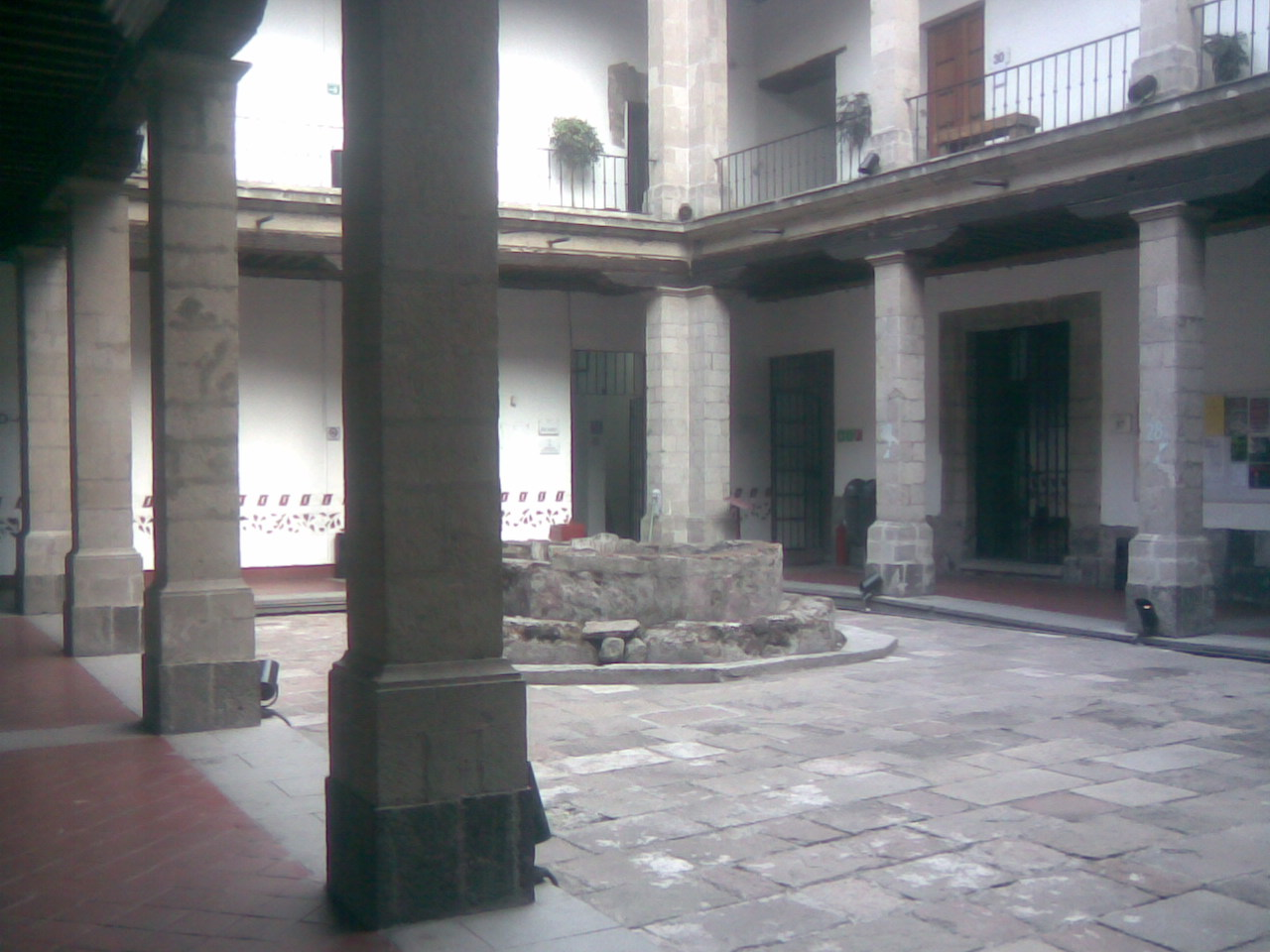
Patio area

In 2007, the Pier Paolo Pasolina Peace Center was inaugurated which "intends to reunite the individual memory with the collective one to find paths to peace."

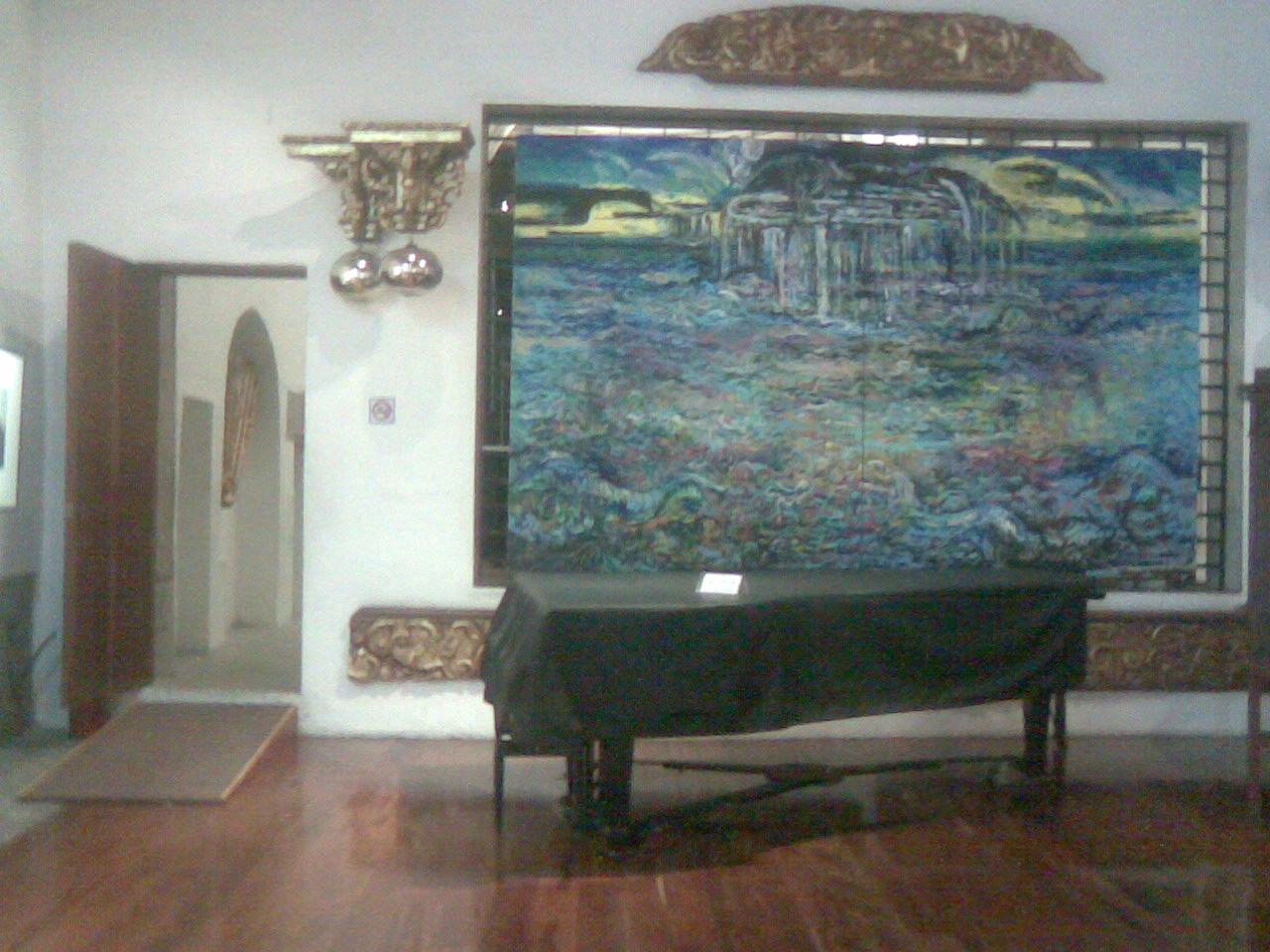
The piano in the upper choir of the former church

Many spaces in the complex are suited to showcase exhibitions of art and culture. The University houses the Museo de la Indumentaria Mexicana "Luis Márquez Romay" (The Luis Márquez Romay Museum of Mexican Attire) . It displays an important collection of traditional Mexican attires, many of which were donated by Carmen Romano, who was First Lady of Mexico from 1976 to 1982. The Museum also hosts temporary exhibits such as the art exhibit "Ocho conjuros para sanar el alma" (Eight spells to heal the soul) as part of the 25th annual Festival de Mexico in the historic center of Mexico City. In 2007, there was an exhibition called "Monjas coronadas" (Crowned Nuns) which displayed artifacts related to the ritual of "marrying God" when nuns take their vows. It included the crowns which were placed on the nun's head, some quite large, during the colonial period. Concerts and art exhibits are showcased in the Former Church of San Jerónimo as well. One of these exhibits was that of a large touring sculpture called "Traición" (Betrayal) . The school also has a collection of musical instruments including four antique pianos, donated and currently used for concerts.

San Jeronimo Street, which runs in front of the main facade, is pedestrian only and is now considered to be a plaza. It is being remodeled to house a "cultural corridor" as part of the university's outreach program to the community that will extend to the College of Vizcainas. The school as a number of other outreach programs, such as literacy education to the estimated 10,000 people in the city center who cannot read or write at a sufficient level. There are also free psychological counseling programs for domestic violence and drug addiction as well. The university says these actions are part of its efforts to support the revitalization of the historic center

According to a survey called "Las Mejores Universidades 2009" (The Best Universities 2009) sponsored by the newspaper Reforma, students at Sor Juana are the largest and pickiest coffee drinkers in Mexico City. One reason for this is that the campus, located in the historic center, is surrounded by a number of gourmet cafes, which attract customers by offering cultural events such as films and poetry readings.

Each year University students construct a monumental "ofrenda" or altar to the dead for Day of the Dead festivities in late October and early November. It is created with the collaboration of ex-students, teachers, artists and neighbors in the historic center of Mexico City. In 2007, the theme of the altar was "Sor Juana and time." It included an hourglass in the center and two thousand meters of cempasúchil garlands. A secondary altar in the Zapotec style was erected in honor of Frida Kahlo. Each year, the monumental altar receives more visits by the public and more neighbors are willing to participate according to the school's dean. This tradition has been annually recreated for over two decades. The Chorus of the Universidad del Claustro de Sor Juana has performed under guest directors such as Rita Guerrero. The chorus specializes in works that are no longer frequently performed, such as the Libre Vermell de Montserrat and El Canto de la Siliba. It is made up of students from various majors and was formed in 2005.

A number of the university's activities are held in partnership with other academic and cultural institutions. The university has a partnership program with UNAM for activities related to teaching, research, community outreach and culture, especially with regards to technical and technological issues. It will allow students of both institutions to attend classes in both places and the two will sponsor a number of joint academic events.

Along with the Fundación del Centro Histórico (Historic Center Foundation), the University has published a guide to restaurants, taco stands, cantinas and other eateries located in the oldest neighborhoods of Mexico City. The guide is called "Guia para Comer Bien en el Centro Historico" (Guide to Eating Well in the Historic Center).

The school is involved with the organization with sponsors the annual "Festival de México" in the historic center to hold conferences and a contest related to the history of cooking in Mexico called Concursos Historias y Sabores de México and Menú de Bicentenario. The objective is to recognize and conserves Mexican gastronomic traditions through research in preparation of the Bicentennial of Mexico's independence in 2010. Participants not only must prepare a representative dish, but also document the dish's history and significance. Another aspect of this event is to work with restaurants in the historic center to prepare special menus for the 2010 Festival de México. The festival ticket would include one dinner from one of these menus

Outside of Mexico City, the university organized a "poetry slam" event as part of the 23rd Feria Internacional de Libro in Guadalajara in 2009. The participants performed original works which were then rated by a panel of poets and rappers. The event was titled "A ritmo de poesía" (To the beat of poetry). The reason the school sponsored the event was to show that poetry is available to all.
