= Los Jaigüey =

Mexican musical group

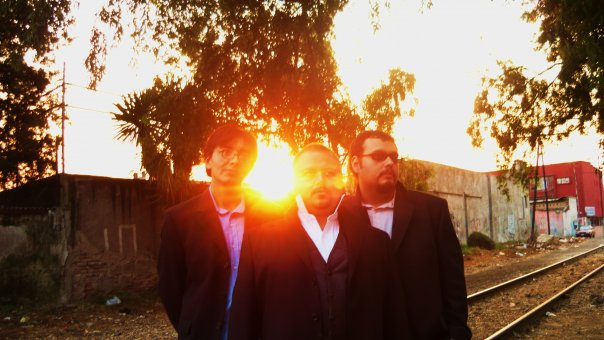

Background information
- Origin: Mexico City, Mexico
- Genres: Rock, funk, cumbia, Norteño, alternative rock, new wave
- Years active: 2006–present
- Label: Productora de Onda/Fonarte Latino
- Members: Poncho Figueroa; Gustavo Jacob; Ricardo Jacob
- Website: www.losjaiguey.com

Los Jaigüey is a Mexican rock band. It is formed by Poncho Figueroa (Bassist founder of the seminal Mexican band Santa Sabina) along with brothers Gustavo Jacob (Thelmo Castelló, La Escalera de Jacob) and Ricardo Jacob (Thelmo Castelló, La Escalera de Jacob and collaborator of the prestigious Proceso magazine) who together form a musical outcome. Particularly focusing in telling short stories depicting characters from different backgrounds and origins often in a reflexive tone. They released their self-titled debut album in late 2009 through Fonarte, an independent label from Latin America.

== Overview ==
The band was formed due to all three musician's participation in Rockdrigo Gonzálezs commemorative concert on September 19, 2005. That day along with Roberto Ponce (pivotal piece of the Música Rupestre scene of Mexican rock besides Rockdrigo) they performed for thousands of people in Mexico City's Zócalo.

August 8, 2006 is the official debut date of the band when John Cameron Mitchell invited them to be his backing band during his participation in the Festival Internacional de Cine Contemporáneo de la Ciudad de México (FICCO) in 2007.

The band also are keen filmmakers, and under the name Cinco Pesos they released their first short film Tepoztlahuilanali Xou that depicts the street show of bassist Poncho Figueroa in nahuatl language with international showings in Damascus, Syria and London, England.

Tha band has released a second album entitled Haciendo Tiempo (Doing Time) and played live for the first time at the Vive Latino Festival in 2013. The album was selected by Rolling Stone magazine as one of the 20 Best Latin Albums of 2013.

Los Jaigüey work with a V.J. named Pixel Mutante during most performances.

== Discography ==
=== Los Jaigüey (2009 Fonarte Latino) ===
The album was released in October 2009.

==== Track list ====
1. "El himno a la alegría" (Hymn to joy)
2. "Pedernal" (Flint)
3. "El lenguaje del amor" (The language of love)
4. "Ya ni sabo que pató" (Dunno what happened)
5. "Humanidad" (Mankind)
6. "Me voy pa'l pueblo" (Goin' back to my hometown)
7. "El loco" (The loony)
8. "Linda Motorista" (Pretty motorist)
9. "Confiar es perder" (To trust is to lose)

=== Haciendo Tiempo (2013 Fonarte Latino) ===
The album was released in March 2013

==== Track list ====
1. "Una Historia o Dos"
2. "Un Trozo de Carne"
3. "Gente de Siempre"
4. "Primero de Diciembre"
5. "Amor de Locación"
6. "Sigo tu voz"
7. "Haciendo Tiempo"
8. "Inocencia, Inconsciencia"
9. "Todo está aquí"

== Members ==
- Poncho Figueroa – vocals, bass
- Gustavo Jacob – guitars, keyboards
- Ricardo Jacob – drums, backing vocals
