= Elis Paprika =

Mexican musician (born 1980)

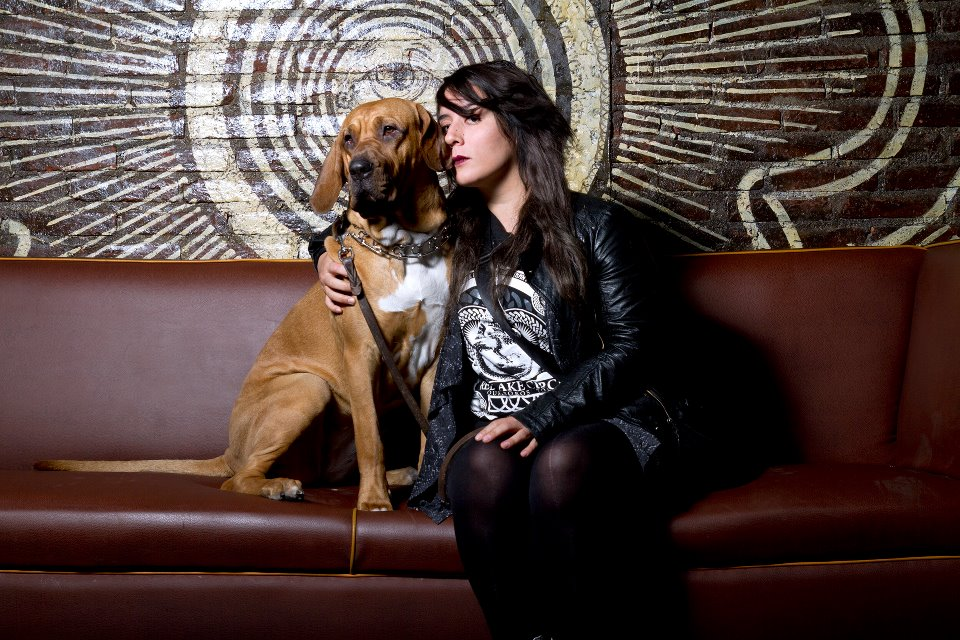
- Elis Paprika in 2012

Background information
- Born: Erika Elizabeth Nogues; May 8, 1980 (age 46); Guadalajara, Jalisco, Mexico
- Genres: Alternative rock, Psych rock, Rock and roll, Grunge
- Occupations: Musician, Singer, Songwriter, Activist
- Instruments: Guitar, Vocals
- Years active: 2004–present
- Label: Now Girls Rule Record Company
- Website: facebook.com/ELISPAPRIKA

Elis Paprika (real name Erika Elizabeth Nogues; May 8, 1980) is an independent musician, singer, songwriter, and activist from Guadalajara, Mexico, active in Mexico's Rock scene since 2004. She has performed in important music venues such as Auditorio Nacional in México City (with Julieta Venegas) in 2007, Belanova in 2008, and Juan Gabriel in 2009., and Hidden Agenda in Hong Kong, as well as performing in international music festivals like Vive Latino in México City (2006, 2011, 2014), Playtime in Ulaanbaatar Mongolia, Meet in Beijing in China, and Altavoz in Medellín, Colombia. Elis has also performed in prestigious sessions like Live on KEXP. Elis Paprika has also performed internationally in North and South America, South East and East Asia, and Europe. She was named "Artist of the Month" on MTV Latin America in August 2006. Musicians in her band have varied throughout the years, and her current live and recording band is called The Black Pilgrims. Elis started her career in Guadalajara Jalisco, Mexico.

She has released 9 records to date, Give Me Love in 2006, EP2 in 2007, Express in 2009, Maldito in 2010, Animal in 2012, Adiós in 2013, Black & White in 2016, Venganza in 2019, Vengo del Futuro y No Hay Futuro in 2025. She also released singles like "Love Love Love" (2011), and "Now Girls Rule" (2014) which were not included in any of her previous records, but became part of Black & White, and singles like "The End Of The World", and "Todo Se Está Cayendo" (both in 2021). She was part of the tribute álbum Amo al Divo de Juarez with her versión of "Hasta Que Te Conocí" by Juan Gabriel, as well as the tribute album Tributo A: Ana José Nacho (Mecano) with her version of "No Tienes Nada Que Perder" by Mecano.

Elis Paprika is also the founder and director of Now Girls Rule, a feminist organisation for music and art.

== Early life ==
Elis was born Erika Elizabeth Nogues on May 8, 1980, in Guadalajara, Jalisco, Mexico, being the youngest of three children. As a child, she trained as an Olympic gymnast and as a dancer. Her father died when she was 6. She moved to Texas with her family as a teenager in 1992 where she lived for one year. She and her family moved back to Guadalajara, and in 1994 Elis moved to Querétaro Mexico to her aunt's. She shortened her name to Elis, inspired by Elis Regina.

== Learning music ==
After moving to Querétaro, her aunt and uncle started her in music lessons, as all of her cousins studied music. Elis has been known to say that what she really wanted was to continue with her dancing in the hopes of becoming a professional dancer. She learned to play the Saxophone and music in general.Still, by a twist of fate some of her friends signed her up (unbeknownst to her) for a singing contest at school in Querétaro, where she ended up in second place. It was there she realized that she wanted a career as a singer. Elis then moved back to Guadalajara where, a year later, she started singing for the local band La Verdad No Importa, from where she was later fired because she "didn’t sing that good". After that rejection she took singing and guitar lessons in order to start writing her own songs. In 2000, after being in a couple of more local bands, she started formal music studies at CEDART for a couple of years. While studying there, she held a job doing press and PR for different concert promoters in Guadalajara.

== Music career ==
=== 2002–2003: First demos ===
She interrupted her studies in 2002 and moved to London England for one year, where she began writing some of the songs she would later release as Elis Paprika. She held a job as a waitress during her stay in London. She returned to Guadalajara México in 2003 where she started a band called The Paprikas, with a local musician named Raul Velazquez (not to be confused with Raúl "Rul" Velazquez, who would later be Elis’ guitar player in The Black Pilgrims). At that point, people began referring to her as "Elis from the Paprikas" or "Elis Paprika", the name she later adopted. After a few tries with The Paprikas, Elis recorded a demo for the song "Sunny Day", working with Shaboomy (later guitar player for Azul Violeta), and Eric Diaz, guitar player and bass player respectively from the band The Waitress from Guadalajara México. The Waitress was originally Elis’ first solo project. The name of the band was inspired by her time working as a waitress in London and Guadalajara before making music. Once she began to be recognized as "Elis Paprika" and making more music apart from her project, Elis left The Waitress. The other members of The Waitress continued without her.

=== 2004: Elis Paprika ===
In February 2004, Elis’ showed the demo of "Sunny Day", to Luke Castillo, who was then playing guitar and singing for the band Becker. Luke liked what he heard and they started working together, and this is where Elis Paprika was formally established, with Luke Castillo on Guitar, Richo Acosta on Guitar, Chumino on Bass, and Chicho (also playing with the band Plastiko), on Drums. With this lineup, Elis recorded the demo for the song "Give Me Love". Chicho left the band and Arnold Benz briefly became the drummer. They recorded demo versions of the songs "Bitch" and "Texas" with him. Arnold left the band and Richo Acosta called Willy Gonzalez, from another band he played in, to take over the drums. Later, Jorge "Gordo" Miramontes came in on bass after Chumino left the band. At this point, and with this lineup, they all decided to work as a band instead of Elis being a solo artist. Elis Paprika then became the name of the band. Their first live show as Elis Paprika took place in Guadalajara Jalisco México, on December 14, 2004, at the Hard Rock Café Guadalajara.

=== 2005–2006: Give Me Love ===
Elis Paprika began playing in several venues and quickly ascended in Guadalajara's rock scene. They played Sol Radiante Festival, Zapopum Festival, and the Hard Rock Live at the Hard Rock Café Guadalajara on several occasions. It was during one of these performances that people from Suave Records became interested in Elis Paprika, signing them in 2005. Under this label, Elis Paprika released the record Give Me Love in 2006, produced by Luke Castillo and Richo Acosta, and was licensed to Sony Music Mexico for its distribution in Mexico.

The first single, "Give Me Love", had a fast and big acceptance, and consequently Elis was invited to play at the Festival Vive Latino in 2006 and Corona Capital, also in 2006. In August of that same year, Elis Paprika was named "Band of the Month" on MTV. After this, MTV invited Elis Paprika to perform live for a recording of the program Alerta.

The song "No Puedo" was released as the second single in October 2006. In November 2006 Julieta Venegas invited Elis Paprika to play on her first Auditorio Nacional performance in Mexico City.

As all of this was taking place, contractual problems began to surface between Elis Paprika and her then record label Suave Records.

=== 2007–2008: EP2, and Juan Gabriel tribute ===
After the success of Give Me Love, problems between Elis Paprika and her then record label Suave Records increased to the point where the impulse the band had, came to a halt.

In early 2007, Elis requested Suave Records to release her, resulting in a lawsuit.

Luke Castillo decided to leave the band to concentrate on his other band Becker, and Ramón "Zacky" Velarde took his place in the band.

Elis recorded her voice for the original score of short film Jacinta, winner of the Festival de Cine de Morelia, from director Karla Castañeda, with music by Gilberto Cervantes. Jacinta was also shown at the Cannes Film Festival that same year.

Elis Paprika recorded EP2 in 2007, but this second record did not see a formal release due to the lawsuit with Suave Records. EP2 was released that same year, but only through free download on the Internet.

Early in 2008, Elis Paprika was invited to be a part of the Juan Gabriel tribute album called Amo al Divo de Juárez. For this, Elis recorded her own version of the Juan Gabriel song "Hasta Que Te Conocí". The record came out, with her version of the song as one of the official singles.

Elis Paprika played on December 8, 2006, for a Green Peace event in Puerto Vallarta, Mexico, in a campaign against illegal fishing in protected waters.

In late 2008 Elis and Suave Records settled their lawsuit, and the band was released from their contract with Suave Records, allowing Elis to concentrate on her band and performances. She signed under new management with Zepeda Bros.

=== 2009: Express ===
At the beginning of 2009, "Gordo" quit the band, and was replaced by Omar “La Doña” Gil on bass, who stayed with the band until early 2010.

Elis Paprika began 2009 with new live performances and writing new songs, and in May of that year, entered the studio to record the songs that would eventually become her album "Maldito", produced by Guido Laris. Originally intended to be released as two separate EPs, the songs were recorded at Montecristo Studios in Mexico City, but once they were ready, it wouldn't be released until some time later, due to differences with her management over the way to handle promotion as an independent release, or through a label.

That summer, Sony Music México invited Elis Paprika to be a part of Tributo A: Ana José Nacho (Mecano), a Mecano Tribute record, where she recorded her version of the song "No Tienes Nada Que Perder".

Juan Gabriel invited Elis to perform live with him on one of his concerts at Auditorio Nacional in Mexico City, to sing her version of "Hasta Que Te Conocí" live.

After not being able to release the songs she recorded that May, Elis Paprika entered the studio once more in Guadalajara at Richo Acosta's studio to record new and previously unreleased songs. Express was released, produced by Richo Acosta, and licensed to EMI Music México for distribution, in October 2009, being this her first record to officially be promoted since Give Me Love in 2006. The first single from Express was "Tarde o Temprano".

=== 2010–2011: Maldito ===
After differences with her bandmates, Elis decided in early 2010, in the middle of promoting Express, not to continue working with the same musicians in her band. They went their separate ways and Elis went back to being a solo artist. This interrupted the promotion of Express.

Luke Castillo came back to play and support Elis on guitars, and had a major role in putting a band back together. Luke invited Paul Richards to play bass, and two other members of the band Aurum from Guadalajara, Vela and Luis Angel, to play guitar and drums respectively.

In May 2010, Elis moved to Mexico City in order to continue and better the handling of her career and to promote future plans. Working with Zepeda Bros. Elis decided to finally use the songs that had been recorded a year before, and since these songs had been on hold for over a year, it was decided to release them as one LP, instead of the two EPs they were originally meant for. It was because of all the time that these songs were on hold, that she named the LP Maldito, which in Spanish means "Cursed".

Meanwhile, Elis began to make new acoustic performances of her songs in unplugged shows, featuring Ernesto "Arbol" Licona, and Ana Lía Perez, on guitars. Ernesto Licona has been constantly playing guitar on Elis’ performances ever since.

That August, Vela and Luis Angel retook their labors with Aurum, and Elis invited Raul "Rul" Velazquez to play guitar, and Jimmy Strike, from the band Cherry Strike from Guadalajara to play drums. With this lineup, Elis played the 212 Festival by RMX, in Guadalajara Jalisco, Mexico, on September 12, 2010. This concert marked the beginning of her "Maldito Tour".

That October, after a couple of shows, Jimmy left the band to retake activities with Cherry Strike, and Cachi Zazueta became the permanent drummer.

Maldito was officially released in late November 2010 under Zepeda Bros., Warner Chappell México, and Drágora Records. It hit stores nationwide in Mexico, and on iTunes internationally.

The Maldito Tour went on until mid-2011, reaching most of Mexico. During this tour, Elis played the Vive Latino Festival for the second time, on March 8, 2011. Maldito became the record to reposition her in Mexico's Rock scene.

At the end of the Maldito Tour, in July 2011, Elis ended her working relationship with her then-management office, Zepeda Bros. and continued as a completely independent artist, handling her own office. Elis recorded the single "Love Love Love" at Suite 21 Studios in Guadalajara Jalisco, produced by Luke Castillo, which was officially released on August 4, 2011, initially as a free download through SoundCloud, as a "thank you" to all of her fans for the success of Maldito. "Love Love Love" is part of the Chilean movie Que Pena Tu Boda's soundtrack, as the main credits theme, making this Elis' debut in South America.

In October 2011, Elis along with Rul and Cachi, from her band, got together in Guadalajara to begin writing Animal. That same month, they entered Suite 21 Studios in Guadalajara Jalisco to record the songs, produced by Luke Castillo, and Rul Velazquez.

=== 2012–2013: Animal ===
Elis released Animal in February 2012, produced by Luke Castillo, and Rul Velazquez, under Drágora Records. For this record, her band since the Maldito Tour of 2010–2011, adopted the name The Black Pilgrims. The song "Animal" was the first single.

In January 2012, Luke Castillo left the band once again, to concentrate on studio work, and was replaced by Stepha Campbell on guitars. In July 2012, Paul Richards left the band. After playing with a couple of substitute bass players for a few months, Dylan Deville joined The Black Pilgrims in November 2012. By the end of 2012, Rul Velazquez left The Black Pilgrims to join Siddartha's band full-time. In January 2013, Cristian Hernandez joined Elis Paprika & The Black Pilgrims on guitars.

On February 1, 2013, the official video for their second single off of the record ANIMAL, "En Mi Cabeza" was released.

On March 12, 2013, Dapuntobeat's record "I/O" was released, featuring Elis on vocals on track #9, "Interzona". On March 16, 2013, Elis sang "Interzona" live with Dapuntobeat at the 2013 Vive Latino Festival in Mexico City.

In early April 2013, Stepha Campbell left The Black Pilgrims and Elis announced open auditions. After auditioning a few guitar players, Adan Ruiz landed the job, his first gig with the band being in Hermosillo, Mexico on June 1, 2013.

=== 2013–2014: Adios ===
On August 27, 2013, the song "Canción de Amor Para los 3" was released as the first single of her record ADIOS. The official video for "Canción de Amor Para Los 3" was released on September 30, 2013. The record "Adiós" was officially released on October 22, 2013.

On December 9, 2013, it was announced that Elis Paprika, along with her Black Pilgrims, were officially part of the XV Vive Latino Festival in Mexico City, as part of her 10th anniversary tour in 2014. This marked her third appearance at Vive Latino.

The official video for the song "Adiós", the second single from the record with the same name, was released on February 13, 2014.

Elis Paprika & The Black Pilgrims began their "Adiós" tour on March 28, 2014, at the Vive Latino Festival in Mexico City.

Elis Paprika announced on October 8, 2014, that Cristina Mo was now the new bass player for her band The Black Pilgrims. Cristina Mo is also a member of the Mexican band Descartes a Kant.

=== 2014–2015: Now Girls Rule! ===
On October 20, 2014, Elis Paprika &The Black Pilgrims released a new single "Now Girls Rule!" that marked the beginning of the Now Girls Rule movement. The song "Now Girls Rule!" features Sandrushka Petrova and Cristina Mo from Descartes a Kant, as well as Renee Mooi, and Vanessa Zamora.

In late April and early May 2015, Elis Paprika & The Black Pilgrims embarked on their first tour of China, playing Beijing and Hong Kong.

On September 2, 2015, Elis Paprika released the single "Soñador".

=== 2016–2018: Black & White, and growth for the Now Girls Rule movement ===
In early 2016, Elis recorded tracks for her double EP "Black" & "White". These recordings feature bass player Vivien Larena. In February 2016, Vans included Elis Paprika's Now Girls Rule movement in their 50th anniversary celebrations, holding a House Of Vans Mexico concert, with Elis Paprika & The Black Pilgrims, Ruido Rosa, and Italian Hip Hop artist Miss Simpatía on March 18. Shaboomy Lozano from the band Azul Violeta replaced Cristian Hernandez who left the Black Pilgrims in early March 2016. Vans also held a "Camp" for girls 8 and up, featuring music lessons given by Now Girls Rule artists, held on March 19 and 20 at School of Rock (company) Mexico City.

On March 4, 2016, Elis Paprika released "Sad Girl", as the first single off Black & White. "Sad Girl" was recorded by Shaboomy Lozano and Eric Diaz, with whom Elis originally began her career. On April 4, 2016, the official video for "Sad Girl" was released.

Black & White was released on June 10, 2016.

On June 2, 2017, the song "Olvídame" was released as the second single off Black & White through ONErpm, with its official video.

Elis Paprika & The Black Pilgrims released an animated video for "All My Friends Are Dead", the third single off Black & White on August 6, 2017. The band toured Mexico, The United States, South Korea, and Europe. The Mexico leg of the tour included the Circuito Indio organised by Mexico's Vive Latino Festival. Elis Paprika & The Black Pilgrims performed at Zandari Festa 2017, held from September 29 to October 1, 2017, in Hongdae, Seoul, South Korea.

In late October 2017, Elis Paprika & The Black Pilgrims premiered the official video for their song "Fight". Cristina Mo returned to the band as bass player.

From late January through mid-February, 2018 Elis Paprika played the final leg of her Black & White tour in the US, and performed in Canada for the first time, with a date in Vancouver BC. On May 4, her song "Now Girls Rule" was featured in Amazon's original series Diablo Guardián, season 1, episode 4.

=== 2018–2020: Venganza ===
Elis recorded Venganza in May, 2018 in Guadalajara, Mexico. This record, Venganza was produced in collaboration with Richo Acosta, one of Elis' original guitar players, at Train Studio GDL. The first single "Stupid Song" was released on August 17, 2018. "Stupid Song" was included in the motion picture soundtrack for the Mexican film "Plan V", directed by Fez Noriega, and scored by Rodrigo Dávila, which premiered August 13, 2018 in movie theatres across Mexico. On September 10, 2018, the official video for "Stupid Song" was released. "Mi Corazón", the second single off Venganza, was released November 9, 2018, with its official video being released on May 6, 2019. The complete record Venganza was released on August 16, 2019.

Elis and the band played South Korea, including performances at Zandari Festa 2018, and Pohang Steel Art Festival in October 2018. They began 2019 with a US-Canada West Coast leg of the tour that began in northern Mexico with an appearance at the Festival Alfonso Ortiz Tirado in Alamos, Sonora. Ernesto Licona returned to the band on guitar. In late June and early July 2019, Elis Paprika toured Japan for the first time, with 4 dates in cities around Tokyo, and were the first Mexican Rock band to perform at Playtime Festival in Ulaanbaatar, Mongolia. Elis played Colombia for the first time at the Festival Internacional Altavoz in Medellín, on November 9, 2019.

On December 8, 2019, Elis' Now Girls Rule movement presented "La Marketa" in Mexico City, the first-ever all-female artist merchandise bazar in Mexico. This first edition of La Marketa involved over 60 female music artists and illustrators from Mexico's scene, directly selling their merchandise, with live showcases by 15 of them, as well as standup routines, and skate lessons.

Elis Paprika's single "Stupid Song" was included by the 34th annual FICG (Guadalajara International Cinema Festival), in Mexico, for the promotion of 2019's "Premio Maguey" (Maguey Award), which recognises LGBT performances and accomplishments in Cinema.

In April 2020, Elis Paprika released a new version of her classic "Mucho", this time called "Mucho (15 Years Later), as a single celebrating 15 years of career. The original song was featured as the third track of her debut album Give Me Love (2006), and was never a single. She recorded a version of the song that the band had always played live, which is different from the original 2006 recording, at Train Studio GDL, with Richo Acosta co-producing, playing guitars, bass, and on recording, mixing and mastering duties. Cachi Zazueta recorded drums.

=== 2020–2021: Now Girls Rule Podcast - TV Show - and The End Of The World ===
On August 18, 2020 Elis began a weekly Now Girls Rule Podcast through the Señal VL channel, produced in collaboration with Vive Latino Festival on digital platforms. The Podcast features music recommendations by Elis, of female-fronted or female-led music acts worldwide.

On October 15, 2020 Elis Paprika released the song "Dance With The Devil", which is the first single off of Lost Kids, her punk record for kids slated for a later release date. The song was produced by Richo Acosta, and Cachi Zazueta.

In February 2021 Elis Paprika became a collaborator for Jalisco Radio, a state-run music radio station for the state of Jalisco in Mexico. Elis recommends female artists, and female fronted bands for some of the station's programs, bringing forth some of her work with Now Girls Rule.

On February 17, 2021, Elis Paprika aired the first episode of "El Show De Now Girls Rule (The Now Girls Rule Show), produced through her Now Girls Rule label and organisation, and aired on Vans Channel 66. The TV show is an all-female artist live music program, with interviews, live performances, and educational segments.

On June 16, 2021, Elis Paprika released the song "The End Of The World" on digital platforms, as live shows were starting to come back in several places around the world, post-COVID-19.

Elis performed in front of a live audience for the first time since the start of the COVID-19 pandemic, on September 10, 2021, at Festival Soxule in the city of Zapotlán El Grande, Jalisco in Mexico. She and the band performed their most recent single "The End Of The World", as well as a new song "Todo Se Está Cayendo" for the first time.

On the first week of October 2021, Elis Paprika coordinated a couple of events at FIMPRO (Mexico's International Music Market for Professionals) through her Now Girls Rule Organisation, including a panel for LGBTQ+ artists, and a panel for women's equality in the music industry under Spotify's Equal program for Women in music.

In early October 2021, Elis was one of the 5 women professionals awarded by Inspiring Girls Mexico, for inspiring new generations of women in Mexico, alongside famed journalist and author Carmen Aristegui, Cristina Mieres Zimmermann from Heraldo Media Group, Boeing 787 Captain Martha Vera Araujo from Aeromexico, and football star Kenti Robles Salas.

On October 11, 2021, Festival Vive Latino in Mexico announced Elis Paprika as one of the artists to perform on their 2022 edition.

On October 22, 2021, Elis Paprika released the song "Todo Se Está Cayendo", and its official video was released on November 4, 2021.

Elis Paprika returned to international touring after 20 months, playing Climate Live Festival in Medellín, a concert in Bogotá, and Fiura Music Festival in Cali, Colombia from October 16–23, 2021.

On December 5, 2021, Elis Paprika and her Now Girls Rule organization held the second edition of La Marketa, their women artist's original merch bazaar in Mexico City.

On December 15, 2021, Elis Paprika performed live at the 4th inaugural concert for House Of Vans México City, alongside Rey Pila, and Marineros.

=== 2022–2024:Now Girls Rule Record Company ===
On January 26, 2022, SXSW (South By Southwest) Music Festival announced Elis Paprika as a featured artist in their 2022 lineup. On March 12, 2022, Elis Paprika, through her Now Girls Rule Organization, presented the first edition of the Now Girls Rule Rally, at House of Vans Mexico, with special guests Jessy Bulbo, Cristina from Vondré, Arroba Nat, Greta Ela, Fer Elío, among others. On March 19, 2022, Elis Paprika performed at Vive Latino Festival in Mexico City for the 4th time in her career. Elis Paprika performed at the first edition of Chilean Wey Festival at Pepsi Center in Mexico City. On August 20, 2022, Elis Paprika performed at Ruido Fest in Chicago IL, as part of her 2022 USA tour, among other cities like Omaha NE, Madison WI, Brooklyn NY, and Manhattan NY.

On November 4, 2022, Elis Paprika released the single "La Verdad", marking her first new music to be recorded after the hiatus created by the COVID-19 pandemic. The song was written and recorded during her U.S.A, and northern Mexico touring cycle in the summer of 2022. With this release, Elis Paprika was featured on the front cover of EQUAL, a global Spotify initiative to promote women music artists, for the month of November 2022. On November 27, Elis Paprika performs at Colombia's Rock al Parque. On January 28, 2023, Elis Paprika was part of the Jury for the 2023 edition of Premios Minervas (Minervas Awards), given out yearly by Mexico's State of Jalisco's Culture Ministry to recognize independent artists from that state.

On March 10, 2023, Elis Paprika presented Now Girls Rule Record Company, her own independent record label, with the release of its first compilation album titled "Ahora Sí Nos Escuchas? Vol. 1" ("Do You Hear Us Now? Vol. 1"). Elis released the single "No Sé Si Vuelva a Verte" on July 6, 2023. Elis released the single "Culero/a" on September 28, 2023. This is the first single off of her EP 'Música Triste Para Gente Feliz' (Sad Music for Happy People), due in 2024. Elis released the song "Krampus", produced by Richo Acosta, Cachi Zazueta, and herself, as the second single from her upcoming punk record for kids, to be named 'Lost Kids', on December 6, 2023.

On February 10, 2024, Elis Paprika was handed a special Minervas Award by the Ministry of Culture, and the State's Culture Television Channel of the State of Jalisco, Mexico in recognition of her career achievements, her contribution to music and culture, and her work through her Now Girls Rule Organization. Many other prominent artists from her home state were also awarded during this ceremony. On March 9, 2024, Through her Now Girls Rule Organization, Elis Paprika organized the first edition of "Amarillo Pollito", an indoor all female lead merch bazaar, with live music, art and skate workshops at House of Vans in Mexico City. Elis released her single "No Hay Amor" on June 11, 2024, produced by Elis, Richo Acosta, and Cachi Zazueta.

=== 2025:Vengo del Futuro y No Hay Futuro ===
On February 11, 2025, Elis Paprika Live on KEXP session was released.

Elis Paprika received the 2025 Música México (México Music) Award on February 26, 2025, from the International Music Fair in Guadalajara, Jalisco Mexico (FIM for its initials in Spanish), for her activism and work creating spaces for women artists in Mexico through her Now Girls Rule Organization.

On March 13, 2025, Elis released the single "Wake Up", featuring hip hop artist Mare Advertencia. On May 8, 2025 Elis released the single "Me Siento Morir". On July 30, 2025 Elis released an EP record called 'Vengo del Futuro y No Hay Futuro' (I'm From the Future, and There Is No Future), featuring the single "Lemon", alongside the previously released songs "Wake Up", and "Me Siento Morir".

== Discography ==
- Give me Love (2006)
- EP2 (2007)
- Express (2009)
- Maldito (2010)
- Animal (2012)
- Adios (2013)
- Black & White Double EP (2016)
- Venganza (2019)
- Vengo del Futuro y No Hay Futuro (2025)

== Singles ==
- "Give Me Love" (2006)
- "No puedo" (2006)
- "No me vas a callar" (2007)
- "Hasta que te conocí" (2008)
- "Tarde o temprano" (2009)
- "Totally Kill Me" (2010)
- "Feliz" (2010)
- "Love Love Love" (2011)
- "Animal" (2012)
- "En mi cabeza" (2013)
- "Canción de amor para los 3" (2013)
- "Adiós" (2014)
- "Now Girls Rule!" (2014)
- "Soñador" (2015)
- "Sad Girl" (2016)
- "Olvídame" (2017)
- "All My Friends Are Dead" (2017)
- "Fight" (2017)
- "Stupid Song" (2018)
- "Mi Corazón" (2018)
- "Free" (2019)
- "Mucho (15 Years Later)" (2020)
- "Dance With The Devil" (2020)
- "The End Of The World" (2021)
- "Todo Se Está Cayendo" (2021)
- "La Verdad" (2022)
- "No Sé Si Vuelva a Verte" (2023)
- "Culero/a" (2023)
- "Krampus" (2023)
- "No Hay Amor" (2024)
- "Wake Up" (2025)
- "Me Siento Morir" (2025)
- "Lemon" (2025)

== Others ==
- "No tienes nada que perder" (2010)
- "Ven a mi casa a ver Donnie Darko" (featuring Pipe Llorens) (2011)
- "Interzona" (2013)
- "Tic Tac" (2013)

== Collaborations ==
- MTV Alerta Live (2006)
- Amo al Divo de Juárez (A Juan Gabriel Tribute Album, featuring many artists, where she participates with her version of “Hasta Que Te Conocí) (2008)
- Tributo A: Ana José Nacho (Mecano) (A Mecano Tribute Album, featuring many artists, where she participates with her version of “No Tienes Nada Que Perder) (2010)
- Dapuntobeat "Interzona" (Track #9 on Dapuntobeat's record "I/O". Elis is featured on vocals) (2013)

== Musicians in her band (The Black Pilgrims) ==
Current Members

- Cachi Zazueta – Drums, Back up Vocals (2010–present)
- Fernanda Nibau – Bass, Back up Vocals (2023–present)
- Richo Acosta – Guitar, Back up Vocals (2004–2010, 2018–present)
- Shaboomy Lozano – Guitar, Back up Vocals (2016–2018, 2025-present)
- Carlos Oceguera Soria – Guitar (2021–present)

Former Members

- Raul "Rul" Velazquez – Guitar (2010–2012)
- Luke Castillo – Guitar, Back up Vocals (2004–2007, 2010–2011)
- Chumino – Bass (2004)
- Chicho – Drums (2004)
- Arnold Benz – Drums (2004)
- Willy Gonzalez – Drums (2004–2010)
- Ramón "Zacky" Velarde – Guitar (2007–2010)
- Jorge “Gordo” Miramontes – Bass (2004–2009)
- Omar "La Doña" Gil – Bass (2009–2010)
- Jimmy Strike – Drums (2010)
- Paul Richards – Bass (2010–2012)
- Stepha Campbell – Guitar, Back up Vocals (2012–2013)
- Dylan Deville – Bass, Back up Vocals (2013–2014)
- Cristian Hernandez – Guitar (2013–2016)
- Majo Villaseñor – Bass (2016–2017)
- Vivien Larena – Bass (February–June, 2016)
- Adán Ruiz – Guitar, Back up Vocals (2013–2018)
- Diego "Diez" Cruz – Guitar, Back up Vocals (2018–2024)
- Ernesto Licona – Guitar, Back up Vocals (2010–2011, 2018–2019)
- Ana Cristina Mo – Bass, Back up Vocals (2014–2015, 2017–2024)

== Awards and nominations ==
On April 10, 2024, Elis Paprika was recognized by Mexico's Senate as one of the country's best Female Singer/Songwriters for her contributions to Mexico's Musical Heritage.

On February 26, 2025, Elis Paprika received the 2025 Música México (México Music) Award, handed annually by the International Music Fair in Guadalajara, Jalisco Mexico (FIM for its initials in Spanish). She received this award for her activism and work creating spaces for women artists in Mexico through her Now Girls Rule Organization.

Management

- Suave Records (2005–2008)
- Zepeda Bros. (2008–2011)
- Now Girls Rule (2011–present)

== In popular culture ==
Elis Paprika is part of soundtracks in popular culture, mainly, but not exclusively in Mexico. Her song "Tarde o Temprano" can be heard in episode two, season 1 of the TV series Soy Tu Fan by Canana Films, and Once TV Mexico, presented on MTV. Her song “Love Love Love” is in the final scene of the Chilean Film Que Pena Tu Boda's soundtrack from 2011. Her songs "Happy", "Give Me Love", and "Texas" are included in the soundtrack of the Mexican film Amor Xtremo from Buenavista Pictures. Her song "Mucho" can be heard in Mexican Film Llamando a un Angel’s soundtrack by Disney Pictures, Karma Films, and Fidecine, 2008. Her voice was recorded for the original score of Mexican short film Jacinta, winner of the Festival de Cine de Morelia (Morelia Film Festival), and shown at the Cannes Film Festival, from director Karla Castañeda. Her song "Feliz" can be Heard in the soundtrack of Mexican Film 31 Días from Goliat Films, 2013. Her song "Now Girls Rule" is featured in Amazon's original series Diablo Guardián, season 1, episode 4. Elis Paprika's songs "Feliz", "Me Desperté", "Love Love Love", "Mucho", and "Boogie Boogie" are part of the soundtrack of Mexican film Lo Que Podríamos Ser, directed by Javier Colinas, which premiered on April 13, 2018. Her song "Stupid Song" is part of the motion picture soundtrack of the Mexican film Plan V, released in August 2018 and directed by Fez Noriega. "Stupid Song" was also used by 2019 FICG (Guadalajara International Cinema Festival) to promote 2019's Maguey Award. Elis Paprika began a new side of her career as a TV host on February 17, 2021, producing "El Show De Now Girls Rule (The Now Girls Rule Show) through her Now Girls Rule organisation, aired on Vans' Channel 66.
