= Gustavo Rodríguez =

Gustavo Rodríguez may refer to:

- Gustavo Rodríguez (actor) (1947–2014), Venezuelan actor
- Gustavo Rodríguez (writer) (born 1968), Peruvian writer
- Gustavo Rodríguez Iglesias (born 1979), Spanish cyclist
- Gus Rodríguez (1960–2020), Mexican gamer and video game journalist
- Gustavo Rodríguez Vega (born 1955), Mexican archbishop
