= The Fury of Achilles =

- Directed by: Marino Girolami
- Written by: Homer (poem); Gino De Santis
- Produced by: Samuel Z. Arkoff
- Starring: Gordon Mitchell; Jacques Bergerac; Piero Lulli
- Cinematography: Mario Fioretti
- Edited by: Mirella Casini
- Music by: Carlo Savina
- Release date: 1962
- Running time: 118 min
- Country: Italy
- Language: Italian

L'ira di Achille, internationally released as The Fury of Achilles, is a 1962 Italian historical drama set in the ninth year of the Trojan War and is based primarily on Homer's Iliad. The film was directed by Marino Girolami and stars Gordon Mitchell as Achilles. It was released in the UK in 1963 as Achilles and was filmed in EuroScope and Eastman Color.

== Plot ==
The film focuses on the events of Homer's Iliad, specifically on the mênis (wrath) of Achilles and its consequences for the Achaean camp following his decision to withdraw from battle. The story strives to remain faithful to the ancient text, and there is a strong correlation with Homer's original work.

== Cast ==
- Gordon Mitchell as "Achilles", son of Thetis and Peleus, lover of the Briseis, and the greatest warrior in the Greek army.
- Jacques Bergerac as "Hector", eldest son of Priam, Crown Prince of Troy, commander and the greatest warrior of the Trojan Army.
- Cristina Gajoni as "Xenia", Briseis's close friend and Patroclus's lover.
- Gloria Milland as "Briseis", Xenia's close friend and Achilles's lover.
- Piero Lulli as "Odysseus", King of Ithaca, one of the leaders of the Greek forces, and the most cunning of the Greek kings.
- Roberto Risso as "Paris", second son of Priam, Second Prince of Troy, and the husband of Helen.
- Mario Petri as "Agamemnon", Commander of the Greek army, the mightiest of the Greek kings, and Menelaus's older brother.
- Erminio Spalla as "Nestor", King of Pylos and the advisor to Agamemnon.
- Fosco Giachetti as "Priam", King of Troy and the father of Hector and Paris.
- Ennio Girolami as "Patroclus", Achilles's best friend, second-in-command of the Myrmidons, and the lover of Xenia.
- Tina Gloriani as "Andromache", Hector's wife and Crown Princess of Troy.

== Production ==
The original version includes footage from The Trojan Horse. These scenes are omitted in the UK version which is altogether 20 minutes shorter.

== Bibliography ==
- Giordano, Michele (1998). Giganti buoni. Rome: Gremese Editore. ISBN 8877421835.
- Hughes, Howard (2011). Cinema Italiano - The Complete Guide From Classics To Cult. London - New York: I.B.Tauris. ISBN 978-1-84885-608-0.

== See also ==
- List of historical drama films
- Greek mythology in popular culture
- The Fury of Achilles - a novel by Gustavo Rodríguez
