= Diablo Guardián =

- Based on: Diablo Guardián by Xavier Velasco
- Starring: Paulina Gaitán
- Composer: Victor Hernández Stumpfhauser
- Country of origin: Mexico
- Original language: Spanish
- No. of seasons: 2
- No. of episodes: 18

Production
- Production company: Televisa

Original release
- Network: Amazon Video
- Release: 3 May 2018 – present

Diablo Guardián is a Mexican television drama based on the 2003 novel Diablo Guardián by Xavier Velasco and adapted by Televisa for Amazon Video. The series consists of two seasons, the first of 10 episodes and the second of 8 episodes. The first season premiered on 3 May 2018. It stars Paulina Gaitán as the titular character. The second season premiered on April 12, 2019.

== Plot ==
The story revolves around Violetta (Paulina Gaitán), a teenager from Mexico frustrated with her life. In a moment of desperation she steals $217,000 from her parents to get to New York, a city where she has always fantasized about starting a new life.

== Cast ==
- Paulina Gaitán as Violetta
- Adrián Ladrón as Pig
- Andrés Almeida as Nefastófeles
- Liz Gallardo as Noemí
- Leonardo Ortizgris as Henry
- Pedro Alonso as Gallego
- Armando Espitia as Lerdo
- Rodrigo Murray as Pedro

== Episodes ==
Series	Episodes	Originally released
1	10	3 May 2018
2	8	12 April 2019

=== Season 1 (2018) ===
No. overall	No. in season	Title	Directed by	Original release date
1	1	"Quién de ellos no era yo?" "Which One of Them Wasn't Me?"	Marc Vigil	3 May 2018
Pig visits the tomb of Violetta and discovers the film that will tell the story of Rosa del Alba Valdivia. Violetta tells Pig how she found the way to escape from her mediocre life to make it to the city of her dreams: New York. Aspects of Pig's own life are revealed: he is a young writer who lives with his grandmother and tries to find the story that will give life to his novel.
2	2	"Más rápida que Supermán" "Faster Than Superman"	Hiromi Kamata	3 May 2018
Violetta crosses the border with the money she stole from her parents. There she meets Eric, a handsome Texan with whom she travels to New York. As well as seeing the sights and going on shopping sprees, Eric tries to pursue his acting career and Violetta decides to help him in the only way she knows: cheating. Pig experiments with drugs with his new friend, Sapo, but his life takes a dramatic turn when his grandmother confesses that she is sick.
3	3	"New York, ¿Truco o trato?" "New York, Trick or Treat?"	Hiromi Kamata	3 May 2018
Violetta discovers that Eric used part of her money to rent an apartment. Although she is disappointed, she ends up giving in to the daily routine of a formal relationship. She soon becomes bored and decides to return to her old ways by getting rid of Eric, who decides to return home. Meanwhile, Pig tries to avoid the reality of his grandmother's illness.
4	4	"Ser o no ser... yo" "To Be or Not to Be... Me"	Batán Silva	3 May 2018
After falling for a con trick, Violetta tries her hand at conning clients at the hotel. Seeing that luck is not on her side, she concludes that using her body in exchange for money is better business. Pig is suffering after his grandmother's death, and flees from his loneliness by seeking out various lovers. He begins to work as an editor in a digital newspaper, where he meets Naomí and starts a strange relationship.
5	5	"Violetta & Associates: porquerías a domicilio" "Violetta & Associates: Filth Delivered Right to Your Home"	Batán Silva	3 May 2018
Violetta enjoys her new profession until Martha, the hotel manager, discovers her. She is forced to explore new territories, without luck. Martha offers Violetta a mutually beneficial relationship and Violetta accepts, trusting Martha, only to be betrayed by her shortly after. Decide to leave New York. Pig starts an open relationship with Naomí, who also maintains a relationship with her boss. Pig is interested in the details and uses them for material for his novel.
6	6	"The Next Level"	Batán Silva	3 May 2018
Violetta arrives in Las Vegas. There she meets a man, 'Super Mario, and learns to share his taste for cocaine. Soon she runs out of money and becomes deeper embroiled in the underworld. Violetta tries to flee but is rescued by Antonio Guerrero, "Nefas", who promises to help. Pig starts working in an advertising agency, his rebellious attitude and intelligence is celebrated by some but envied by others.
7	7	"La sombra de Nefastófeles" "In Nefastofeles' Shadow"	Batán Silva	3 May 2018
Pig and Violetta finally meet and start a love affair. Violetta's mysterious past arouses curiosity in Pig. In New York, Violetta also initiates a loving relationship with Nefas, who will soon show his dark side. Vice and naivety lead Violetta to become Nefas' tool, but she is willing to put up with all kind of abuse, in order to achieve her goal.
8	8	"Mucha mierda, poco tiempo" "So Much Crap, So Little Time"	Batán Silva	3 May 2018
Violetta tries to outsmart Nefas and does business directly with El Gallego but his henchman Henry discovers her intentions. Violetta feels trapped in a different life from what she imagined and looks for a way out. Meanwhile, her relationship with El Gallego intensifies and she decides to take advantage of the situation to set a trap for everyone. Pig, besotted with Violetta, begins to think that she is the story of his novel.
9	9	"Postales sin remitente" "No Return Address"	Batán Silva	3 May 2018
Violetta's plan fails. El Gallego discovers her, spares her life but gives her to Nefas, who takes advantage and decides to make her a prostitute. When everything seems to be going wrong, Eric reappears. Without knowing her history, he tries to convince Violetta to go back to Texas with him and get married. Nefas takes Violetta to meet a sadistic client, but this time Violetta refuses to take any more abuse.
10	10	"Bye Bye Miss Nobody"	Hiromi Kamata & Batan Silva	3 May 2018
After rejecting the idea of running away with Eric and discovering that Nefas would never help her become legal, Violetta escapes and seeks the help of Henry who, stunned that Nefas has been withholding his mother's papers of residence, confronts and kills his boss. Violetta leaves the city after robbing Henry. Six months later, she is in Mexico, working alongside Pig at the agency and in some kind of relationship with him, but there is one more surprise in store.

=== Season 2 (2019) ===
No. overall	No. in season	Title	Directed by	Written by	Original release date
11	1	"En Busca De Mi Camaro Amarillo" "In Search of My Yellow Camaro"	Unknown	Unknown	12 April 2019
12	2	"Overstock De Mentiras"	Unknown	Unknown	12 April 2019
13	3	"Corre, Huye, Desaparece... Conmigo" "Run, Run Away, Disappear... with Me"	Unknown	Unknown	12 April 2019
14	4	"The Passenger"	Unknown	Unknown	12 April 2019
15	5	"Puntos Suspensivos" "Ellipsis"	Unknown	Unknown	12 April 2019
16	6	"My Hero Is a Bastard"	Unknown	Unknown	12 April 2019
17	7	"Amor Apache" "Apache Love"	Unknown	Unknown	12 April 2019
18	8	"Yo Maté A Violetta" "I Killed Violetta"	Unknown	Unknown	12 April 2019
