= Cristian Alarcón Casanova =

Chilean writer and journalist (born 1970)

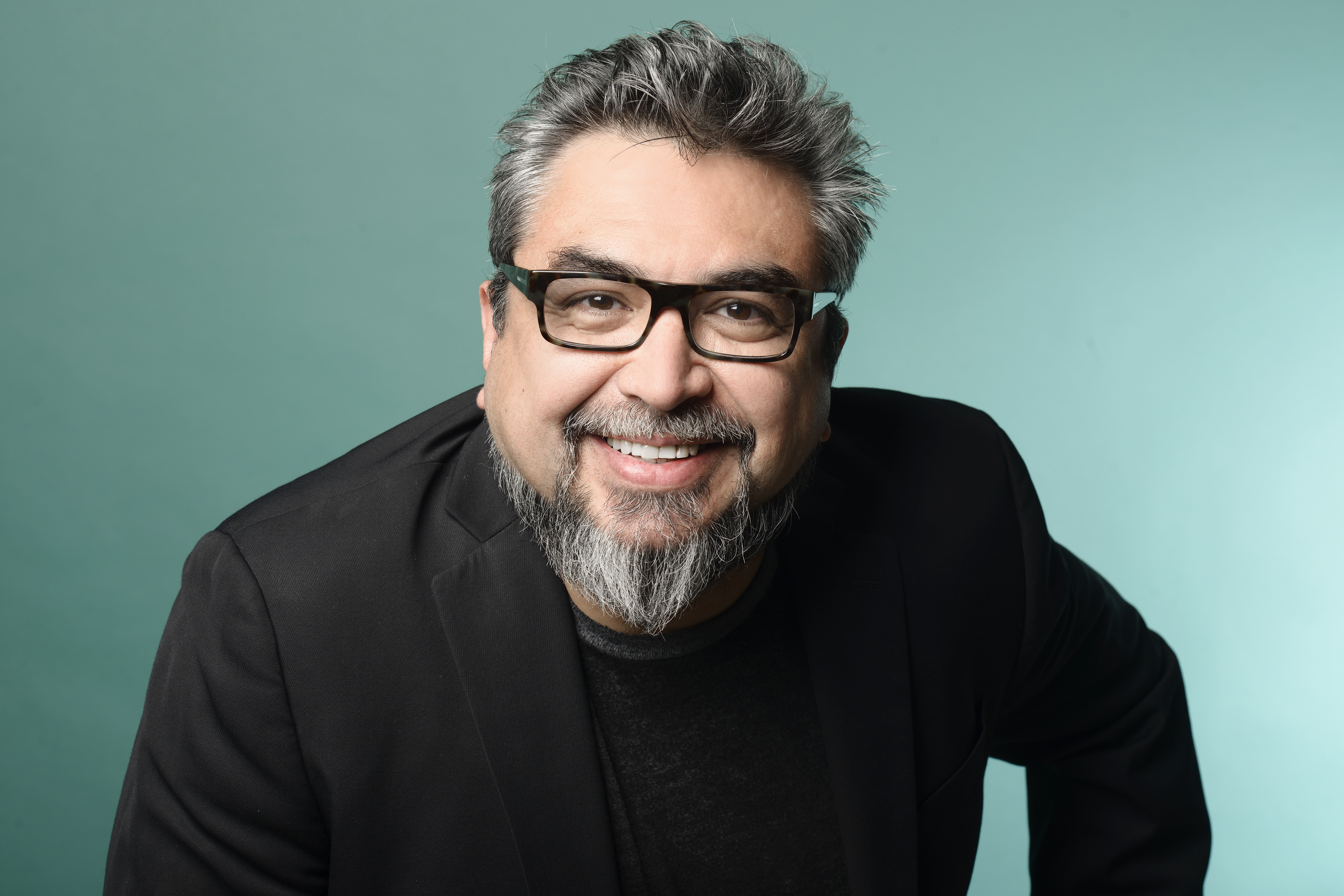
Casanova in 2016

Cristian Alarcón Casanova (born 1970) is a Chilean writer and journalist. He was born in La Union and studied at the Universidad Nacional de La Plata. Since the early 1990s, he has devoted himself to investigative journalism. His work has been published in newspapers such as Clarín, Página 12, Crítica de Argentina and in the magazines TXT, Rolling Stone and Gatopardo. In 2012, he founded the Revista Anfibia magazine and the Cosecha Roja website, and he has since taken further his experimentation with non-fiction narrative.

He has published four books till date. His debut novel El tercer paraíso won the Alfaguara Prize in 2022. His books have been translated into English, French, German and Polish.

He is a tenured professor at the University of La Plata and also teaches at the National University of San Martín. He has been a visiting professor at the University of Texas-Austin, the University of Lille and the Gabo Foundation.
