= Santiago Roncagliolo =

Peruvian writer, screenwriter, translator and journalist

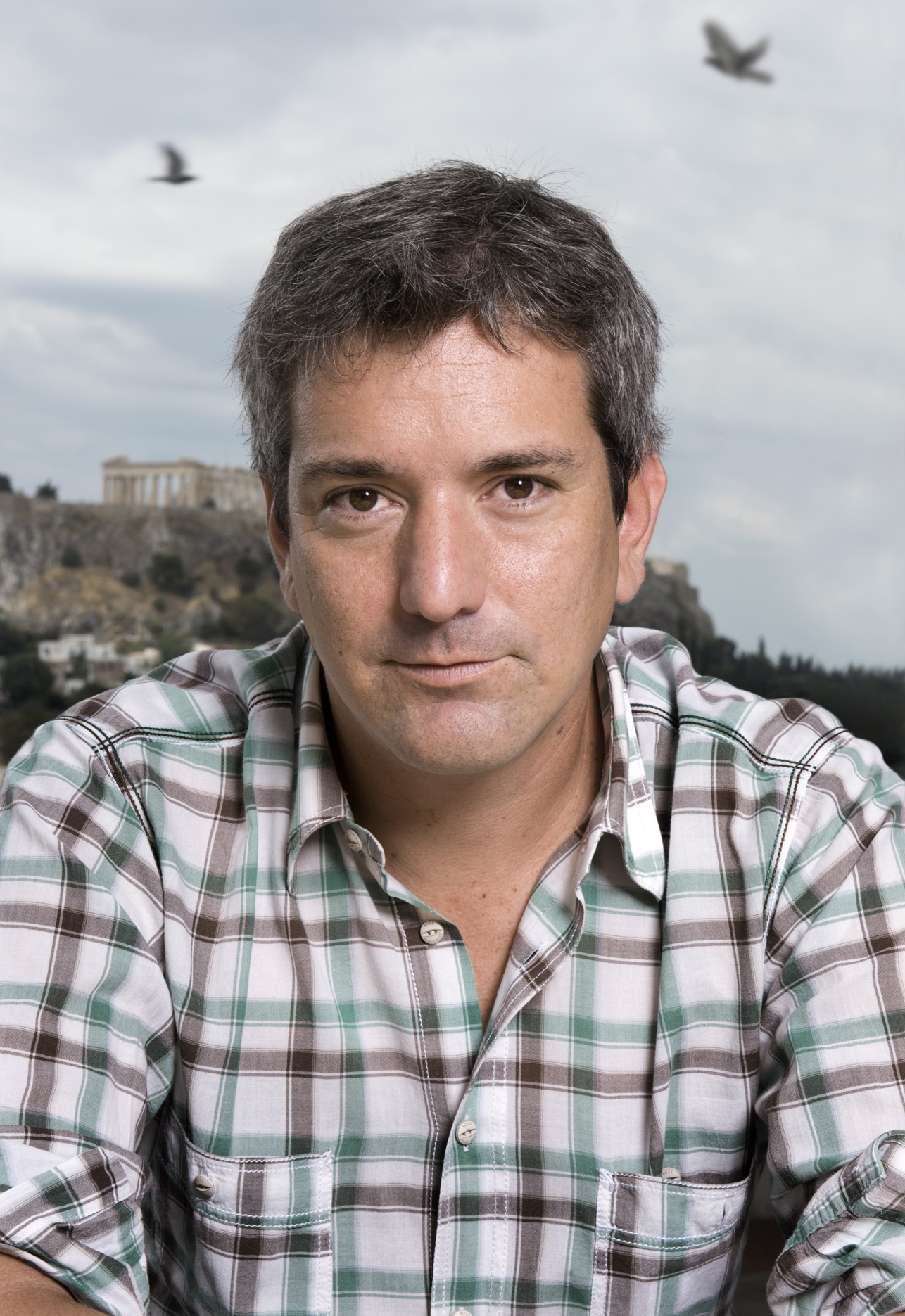
- Born: March 29, 1975 (age 51); Lima, Peru
- Occupation: Writer
- Writing career
- Language: Spanish
- Genres: Novel, Short stories
- Notable works: Abril Rojo, Memorias de una dama, Pudor
- Notable awards: Alfaguara de Novela, Independent Foreign Fiction Prize
- Website: facebook.com/santiago.roncagliolo

Santiago Rafael Roncagliolo Lohmann (born March 29, 1975) is a Peruvian writer, screenwriter, translator and journalist. He has written five novels about fear. He is also author of a trilogy of non-fiction books on Latin America during the twentieth century.

He is the son of the diplomat and politician, Rafael Roncagliolo (1944–2021), who was the Minister of foreign affairs of Peru from 2011 to 2013.

== Biography ==
Born in Lima, Peru, Santiago Roncagliolo spent part of his childhood in Mexico, where his family was exiled. As he says: "I grew up in a family of exiles. My classmates were children from Chile, Argentina, Central America or Uruguay. We went to school with shirts of the Sandinista National Liberation Front and played games of "popular war". And above all, we believed that some day we would have a revolution, whatever it was. But when I returned to Peru, there was already a revolution under way: The Shining Path, and it was not nice. It was made of blackouts, fear, bombs and dead people." There, Roncagliolo met the fear, that is the obsession of all his novels. That experience was also the subject of his novel Red April and his non-fiction book La Cuarta Espada.

Roncagliolo dreamed of becoming a writer. In Lima, reached to publish books for children and a play while working in the Human Rights Commission, until in 2000, he flew to Madrid determined to succeed. He served as a ghostwriter and obtained legal residence with a contract for house cleaning. Says the author: "I went to Spain to be a writer, in the wake of the Latin Americans who had triumphed in Europe, such as García Márquez, Vargas Llosa or Jose Donoso. I soon realized losers far outnumber the winners, but no one knows their stories. In honor of all those martyrs of literature, I decided to write the story of a loser". In the end, Roncagliolo actually became a writer in Spain. He currently resides in Barcelona.

In 2006 his novel Red April won the Alfaguara Prize novel. In English, that novel received the Independent Foreign Fiction Prize. It is translated to more than 20 languages.

His non-fiction book Memorias de una Dama (2009) recalls his life as a ghost writer for the daughter of a powerful Dominican family with roots in fascism, mafia and Caribbean dictatorships. But the family censored the book. It was retired from shelves and, still now, his author is forbidden to talk about it.

In 2010 he was chosen by the British magazine Granta as one of 22 best writers in Spanish under 35 years.

The Uruguayan lover (2012) is the story of writer Enrique Amorim: millionaire but communist, homosexual but married, Uruguayan but Argentinian, he was a fascinating impostor who shared secrets with the best artists of 20th century: Pablo Neruda, Charles Chaplin or Pablo Picasso. He was in love with Federico García Lorca and even hinted that he had buried the remains of the Granada poet. The Uruguayan lover culminates with La Cuarta Espada and Memorias de una dama, a trilogy of true stories about Latin American twentieth century.

In 2014, Roncagliolo published La Pena Máxima, a new adventure of fiscal Felix Chacaltana, star of Red April, set in the 1978 World Cup during the Argentinian dictatorship. That year, The Wall Street Journal named him one of six authors following in the footsteps of Gabriel García Márquez.

In English, he has also published a collection of black humour short stories: Hi, this is Conchita (2013), as most of his work, is translated by Edith Grossman, who has worked with the most noted Hispanic authors from Cervantes to García Márquez.

Roncagliolo has also been a screenwriter, investigative journalist and political adviser. His novel Pudor was made a film. His other novels Tan cerca de la vida and Oscar y las mujeres explore psychological thriller and black humour. Collaborations with the Spanish newspaper El País and various Latin American newspapers. He has translated a number of authors, such as Jean Genet, Joyce Carol Oates, and André Gide.

== Works ==
- Pudor (Alfaguara, 2005).
- Matías y los imposibles (Siruela, 2006).
- El príncipe de los caimanes (Planeta, 2006).
- La cuarta espada: la historia de Abimael Guzmán y Sendero Luminoso (Debate, 2007).
- Jet lag (Alfaguara, 2007).
- Abril rojo (Alfaguara 2007).
- Memorias de una dama (Alfaguara, 2009).
- Tan cerca de la vida (Suma de Letras, 2011).
- Mi primera vez (Endebate, 2012).
- Oscar y las mujeres (Alfaguara, 2013).
- El amante uruguayo: una historia real (Punto de Lectura, 2013).
- La pena máxima (Alfaguara, 2014).
- La noche de los alfileres (Alfaguara 2016).
- El material de los sueños: historias del cine y del espectáculo (Arpa, 2018).
- El gran escape (El Barco de Vapor, 2020).
- Lejos: Historias de gente que se va (Alfaguara, 2022).
- El año en que nació el demonio (Seix Barral, 2023)
