= Ema Wolf =

Argentine writer and journalist (born 1948)

Ema Wolf (born May 4, 1948) is an Argentine writer and journalist. She has written numerous children's books and won the Alfaguara Prize for her book El turno del escriba, co-written with Graciela Montes.
