= Daniel Sueiro =

Spanish writer

Daniel Sueiro (1931-1986) was a Spanish author and journalist. He was born in La Coruña and died in Madrid. He is best known for two of his ten books: the short story collection Los conspiradores (1959) which won the Premio Nacional de Literatura, and the novel Corte de corteza (1969) which won the Premio Alfaguara.

As a journalist he wrote for the Spanish publications "Arriba" and "Pueblo."
