= Alfaguara Prize =

Spanish-language literary award

Alfaguara Novel Prize
- Country: Spain
- Presented by: Alfaguara / Publishing house's editorial team
- Status: Active
- First award: 1965 (Reconvened 1998)
- Website: https://premioalfaguara.com

The Alfaguara Novel Prize (Spanish: Premio Alfaguara de Novela) is a Spanish-language literary award. The award is one of the most prestigious in the Spanish language.It includes a prize of US$175,000(about €162,000) making it one of the richest literary prizes in the world. It is sponsored by Alfaguara, a publisher owned by Penguin Random House.

The prize was created in 1965 by Alfaguara and continued until 1972. In 1980 Alfaguara was purchased by Grupo Santillana. In 1998 the award was reconvened.

The prize is notable not only for its monetary value but also because the winner receives an original sculpture by the renowned Spanish artist Martín Chirino. The competition requires submitted manuscripts to be original, unpublished works written in Spanish. A key feature of the prize is the simultaneous publication and distribution of the winning novel across almost all Spanish-speaking countries (including Spain, the US Hispanic market, and Latin America), ensuring immediate, widespread reach for the author. Recent winners include Sergio del Molino (2024) and Guillermo Saccomanno (2025).

== Winners ==
Year	Title	Author	Nationality
1965	Las corrupciones	Jesús Torbado	Spain
1966	Pascua y naranjas	Manuel Vicent	Spain
1967	Fauna	Héctor Vázquez-Azpiri	Spain
1968	Corte de corteza	Daniel Sueiro	Spain
1969	No awardees		
1970	Todas esas muertes	Carlos Droguett	Chile
1971	Leña verde	Luis Berenguer	Spain
1972	Florido mayo	Alfonso Grosso	Spain
1973–97	Not organised		
1998	Caracol Beach	Eliseo Alberto	Cuba
1998	Margarita, How Beautiful the Sea	Sergio Ramírez	Nicaragua
1999	Son de mar	Manuel Vicent	Spain
2000	Últimas noticias del paraíso	Clara Sánchez	Spain
2001	La piel del cielo	Elena Poniatowska	Mexico
2002	El vuelo de la reina	Tomás Eloy Martínez	Argentina
2003	Diablo guardián	Xavier Velasco	Mexico
2004	Delirium	Laura Restrepo	Colombia
2005	El turno del escriba	Graciela Montes; Ema Wolf	Argentina
2006	Red April	Santiago Roncagliolo	Peru
2007	See How Much I Love You	Luis Leante	Spain
2008	Chiquita	Antonio Orlando Rodríguez	Cuba
2009	Traveller of the Century	Andrés Neuman	Spain-Argentina
2010	El arte de la resurrección	Hernán Rivera Letelier	Chile
2011	The Sound of Things Falling	Juan Gabriel Vásquez	Colombia
2012	Una misma noche	Leopoldo Brizuela	Argentina
2013	La invención del amor (Inventing love)	José Ovejero	Spain
2014	El mundo de afuera	Jorge Franco	Colombia
2015	Contigo en la distancia	Carla Guelfenbein	Chile
2016	La noche de la usina	Eduardo Sacheri	Argentina
2017	Rendición	Ray Loriga	Spain
2018	Una novela criminal	Jorge Volpi	Mexico
2019	Mañana tendremos otros nombres	Patricio Pron	Argentina
2020	Salvar el fuego	Guillermo Arriaga	Mexico
2021	Los abismos	Pilar Quintana	Colombia
2022	El tercer paraíso	Cristian Alarcón	Chile
2023	Cien cuyes	Gustavo Rodríguez	Peru
2024	Los alemanes	Sergio del Molino	Spain
2025	The Wind Will Arrive	Guillermo Saccomanno	Argentina
