= Delirium (Restrepo novel) =

Novel by Laura Restrepo

Delirium (Delirio) is a novel by Colombian author Laura Restrepo. With this book, Restrepo won the prestigious Premio Alfaguara de Novela in 2004. Natasha Wimmer's English translation was published in 2007.

== Plot summary ==
Plot overview

Delirium opens when its main protagonist, an ex-Literature professor turned traveling Purina salesman named Aguilar, discovers that while away on a four-day business trip his wife Agustina endured an experience that provoked a severe dissolution of her sanity. The book chronicles Aguilar's search for answers and his efforts to rehabilitate his young, beautiful and admittedly singular wife through the use of alternating narrative styles that, as the novel progresses, shed further light on the mysterious events that took place during Aguilar's absence as well as the nature of Agustina's family and childhood, both of which precipitated Agustina's struggle with mental illness.

Delirium is organized and constructed through the utilization of a narrative pattern that proceeds in the following order: Aguilar, Midas (Agustina's ex-lover), Agustina, Aguilar, third-person narration of Nicholas and Blanca Portulinus (Agustina's grandparents). This pattern is repeated throughout the majority of the novel and helps to streamline and isolate the progression of several distinctly different, albeit entirely connected, storylines that are never eager to lend the reader immediate access to their secrets.

Plot: in depth

Delirium begins when Aguilar returns home from a weekend business trip to find several messages on his answering machine asking him to come pick his wife up at a hotel in downtown Bogotá. Upon arriving at the hotel Aguilar finds Agustina in her room with a strange man, existing only as a bombed out shell of her former self. Once home Agustina remains incredibly distant, sometimes even hostile, too preoccupied with abnormal purification rituals and rantings about her dead father's impending visit, to leave the apartment or even get dressed. Driven by his love for his wife, and aided by the unexpected arrival of Agustina's Aunt Sofi, Aguilar refuses to give up, however, and sets out to discover exactly what happened to Agustina.

Aguilar cannot unravel the events of that weekend or resuscitate Agustina's sanity without help and thus he enlists the aid of an alluring hotel employee, named Anita, who lets Aguilar know that whoever his wife was with that weekend their behavior was in no way romantic and provides Aguilar with some of Agustina's belongings that she had left at the hotel. Even more integral to the success of Aguilar's investigation, however, is Aunt Sofi, who, in conjunction with Agustina's narratives about her childhood and the narrative depicting Nicholas Portulinus' own struggles with insanity, helps Aguilar to better understand Agustina's past, which helps to better explain her present behavior.

The reader comes to discover Agustina's childhood was not a typical one. She grew up as the sole, attention-deprived daughter in an extremely wealthy Colombian family, the Londoños, and exhibited signs of mental instability (perhaps inherited from her grandfather who one night, when under the supervision of Agustina's mother, Eugenia, wandered off and drowned in a nearby river) even as a child. Agustina believed that she possessed visionary powers, powers that allowed her to see the future, and in her youth Agustina and her little brother, Bichi, would often perform rituals, often in an attempt to spare her brother from the wrath of her father who would physically and emotionally harass Bichi for his effeminate tendencies. The source of Agustina's power, as she believed, were several photographs that Bichi and her used secretly during their rituals; photographs that would later come to tear her family apart.

Running parallel to the rest of the novel Midas' rags to riches to rags storyline tells the tale of Midas, a high class Aerobics Center owner and money launderer for Pablo Escobar, and his equally well to do and similarly employed friends (one of which happens to be Agustina's brother Joaco). Midas' story initially focuses upon a friendly, albeit high stakes, bet that Midas could organize a sexual situation to arouse his newly paralyzed and consequently impotent friend, Spider. Midas' story soon takes a turn for worse when Spider's thugs, while in the process of attempting to arouse Spider via the means of sadomasochism, inadvertently kill a prostitute (Sara Luz) in Midas' gym. The authorities are soon called into investigate and although they find nothing, Midas has covered his tracks well, he nonetheless feels the need to get away for a relaxing weekend, accepting an invitation from Joaco to come spend the weekend with the Londoño family (minus Carlos Vincente Sr. who has since died) at their estate in Sasaima.

Once there, however, Midas realizes that, due in large part to her mother's insistence on skirting the truth, Agustina has begun to slip precariously towards her madness, a madness that Midas, being Agustina's former lover, knows all too well. Before the delirium is able to fully set in, however, Midas puts Agustina on the back of his motorcycle and rushes her away from both her family and her own deteriorating mind. Midas' heroism does not last long, though, for he soon hatches a plan to save his reputation that inadvertently plunges Agustina into her debilitating dementia.

Soon, however, it becomes clear (due to the information that the other narratives grant) that Agustina is already well on her way to recovery. The novel concludes positively when Aguilar returns home one night to find a note written by Agustina. "Professor Aguilar", it reads "if you still love me despite everything, wear a red tie tomorrow." Aguilar then, with a certain degree of romanticism, wakes up the next morning and dons the reddest tie he could find before heading down the stairs to breakfast.

== Characters ==
- Aguilar: An ex-professor of literature and current Purina dog food salesman who is sixteen years older than his wife Agustina.
- Agustina Londoño: A beautiful but unstable woman with a troubled, albeit, privileged past.
- Nicholas Portulinus: Agustina´s grandfather who, like Agustina, exhibited extensive symptoms of severe mental illness. Nicholas was a German transplant and a talented composer who perished in a drowning accident/suicide.
- Blanca Portulinus: Nicholas' wife and Agustina's grandmother. Blanca was significantly younger than Nicholas when their relationship began via piano lessons and after his death developed denial skills that were inevitably transferred to her daughter Eugenia.
- Carlos Vicente Londoño Sr.: Agustina's distant father and the uncontested ruler of the Londono household. Carlos had an affair with Aunt Sofi that eventually tore the Londoño family apart and precipitated the deterioration of Agustina's sanity.
- Eugenia Londoño: Agustina's stoic mother whose inherited ability, and unwavering tendency, to manipulate the truth helps to exasperate Agustina's already fragile condition.
- Joaco Londoño: Agustina's talented and masculine older brother who, like his mother, also possesses the innate ability to modify actuality in the name of convenience.
- Carlos Vicente "Bichi" Londoño Jr: Agustina's younger brother who was subjected to the abuse of his father due to his homosexual tendencies. After a particularly brutal instance of this abuse Bichi, in an act of defiance, exposes the Londoño family's darkest secret and leaves for Mexico with Aunt Sofi.
- Aunt Sofi: Agustina's mysteriously pariah aunt who arrives unannounced to help Aguilar cope with Agustina's mental state. Aunt Sofi eventually proves invaluable in helping Aguilar to understand the nature of Agustina's trying past.
- Midas McAlister: Agustina's ex lover and an expert money launderer, Midas worked his way up from very humble beginnings to become incredibly, if only temporarily, wealthy. Embroiled in a murder investigation crafts a plan to prove his innocence through the use Agustina's visionary powers which goes horribly awry.
- Spider Salazar: Midas newly paralyzed friend who becomes the subject of a sexual bet that results in the death of a prostitute in Midas' gym.
- Anita "The Fearless Girl": An alluring and somewhat rogue employee at the hotel where Aguilar found Agustina after her disastrous weekend. Aguilar later enlists her help to uncover some of the details of Agustina's mysterious stay at the hotel.

== Historical context ==
Delirium is set in Colombia's capital city of Bogotá during the mid-1980s. This historical period was a turbulent one for Colombia seeing as its government, economy and people, had fallen under the influence of the Medellin Cartel who used murder and intimidation to control law enforcement officials, politicians and citizens. Led by Pablo Escobar and specializing in international drug trafficking the cartel helped Colombia to rise to the top of the world murder rate by 1985, which in turn prompted the United States Drug Enforcement Administration to commit nearly 362.4 million dollars a year to the eradication of the Medellin Cartel.

Laura Restrepo sheds further light on this cultural instability when, in Delirium Aguilar and Anita hear and feel the bombing of a police station in downtown Bogotá and later when Aguilar discusses how the road to Sasaima, where Agustina's family has a second home, cannot be driven in the late afternoon because at that point the army abandons their patrols and the guerillas come down from the mountains and assume control. Because of instances like this, as well as the novels preoccupation with the behavior and influence of Pablo Escobar, many have come to view Delirium as an illustration of Colombia's fragile, corrupted and war torn society and a commentary on the strain that an unstable culture can inflict on the sanity of its citizens.

== Major themes ==
- Delirium
- Pablo Escobar
- Colombia
- Illegal drug trade in Colombia
- Colombia in popular culture
- Homosexuality

== Critical reception ==
Delirium, since its inception and eventual translation into English, has been reviewed and received quite well, although, not without fault. The following are excerpts taken from several reviews of Deliriumand a list of the awards it has earned.

=== Reviews ===
- "Delirium is a disconcertingly lovely book, and its depiction of Colombian society at an awful moment in its history (and a few awful times before) is sharp, vivid, utterly persuasive...But by the end it seems a fair description of Delirium which is both sweeter than you'd expect and less nourishing than you'd hope."

-The New York Times, Terrance Rafferty

- "Saying that Laura Restrepo's writing is beautiful is kind of like saying that the Eiffel Tower is in Europe. Every word in Delirium is perfectly chosen, painfully honest, and brutally effective. Restrepo chooses her words like a poet, with infinite care. Even without her superb writing, though, Restrepo's novel would be excellent, her story intriguing and engrossing."

-The Philadelphia Inquirer

- "Laura Restrepo breathes life into a singular amalgam of journalistic investigation and literary creation. Her fascination with popular culture and the play of her impeccable humor save her novels from any temptation toward pathos or melodrama, and infuse them with unmistakable reading pleasures."

-Gabriel Garcia Marquez

- "Laura Restrepo's Delirium is a book-and-a-half: stunning, dense, complex, mind-blowing. This novel goes far above politics, right up into high art."

-The Washington Post

- "Delirium is one of the finest novels written in recent memory. Restrepo has a total mastery over what she writes, an astonishing but absolute mastery. Yes, there’s violence, narcotraffic, madness, perhaps even love itself as a form of total madness. The important thing is that we’re talking about a truly great novel, of a kind that you seldom encounter anymore."

-Jose Saramago

=== Awards ===
- Alfaguara Prize (2004)
- Grinzane Cavour Prize (2006)
