= Graciela Montes =

Argentine writer and translator (born 1947)

Graciela Montes (born 1947) is an Argentine writer and translator. Born in Buenos Aires, she graduated from the University of Buenos Aires. The author of numerous books for children and young adults, she has also written a number of books for grown-ups. She won the Premio Alfaguara for her book El turno del escriba, co-written with Ema Wolf.
