= Red April =

Red April (Abril rojo) is the English translation from Spanish of a whodunit novel by Santiago Roncagliolo, published in 2006 and was awarded the Alfaguara Prize that year.

== Plot summary ==
The story unfolds around presidential elections and Holy Week in the year 2000, which is to say, in a period after the internal confrontations caused by the war against terrorists that took place in Perú in the decades of the eighties and the nineties. Nonetheless, the after-effects of this clash are evident in the novel as is discussed.

The main character, Associate District Prosecutor Félix Chacaltana Saldívar—who as associate district attorney attempts to investigate serial murders supposedly related to resurgent terrorists of Sendero Luminoso (Shining Path), despite lacking direct, first-hand experience with the armed conflict that battered the country—upon whose return to Ayacucho and while in the pursuit of his duties becomes involved with people that definitely have had experience with Senderistas like Edith, the daughter of terrorists; with Hernán Durango (a jailed terrorist) and Commander Carrión.

Associate District Prosecutor Félix Chacaltana Saldívar appears at first as someone who has great faith in the formality of procedures. He is organized, precise and pedantic to a “T”, with high regard for proper grammar—in a word, he is "anal"; he is intellectual and even ingenuous, to a certain degree, until he goes about uncovering corruption that exists in different procedures in which he is directly involved: for example, the presidential elections or usurpation of authority. Thus it dawns on him that he is able to use his authority for his own designs and file reports that have nothing to do with reality. The novel's ending chronicles his tragic, yet at times comical, descent into madness.

Narrated in a lineal manner the novel thus begins with the report on the first murder that was carried out and from which there will come a series of murders that the assistant district attorney investigated. From this point on the different events of the story will become known owing to conversations the main character has with others and the reports filed by this prosecutor.

One ought to be reminded that the novel can be understood as a place where different facts are given expression, on one hand as a faithful rendition as they took place, or by use of fiction on the other. Upon reading one can find that the novel reviewed touches on topics that positively have occurred and are validated in detailing events of Uchuraccay, the Quechua Indian myth of the Inkarrí as related cogently by Father Quiroz, festivals like the fertility rite and Turu pukllay (indigenous bullfight) (cf., photo ), the Holy Week processions, in mentioning the terrorist practice of hanging dogs from street lamps. The author also bases a character named Edith, albeit quite loosely, on an actual Senderista martyr of the same first name (Edith Lagos), who was the daughter of a prosperous local businessman and sprung from jail in a Senderista raid on the Centro de Reclusión y Adaptación Social (CRAS) de Huamanga (Penitentiary and Social Change Center of Huamanga).

These events definitely occurred in the past and such facts still exist in Ayacucho, and are not a figment of the writer's imagination. A question arises from this commentary: is this novel a resource for historical facts? One should be cautious and keep in mind that the author is not obliged to narrate facts according to the truth; but rather it depends on how he wishes to handle it, by exaggerating it or playing it down. Besides, one should keep in mind the author's note that says:

“The methods for Senderista attacks described in this book, as well as the counterterrorism strategy of investigation, torture and making people disappear are real. Much of the characters’ dialogue is, in effect, quoted from documents from Shining Path or from the statements of terrorists, officials and members of Peruvian armed forces who took part in the conflict. The dates for Holy Week in 2000 and the description of the celebration are also true. Nevertheless, all of the characters as well as the majority of situations and places mentioned here, are fiction, including the factual details that have been removed from context of place, time and meaning. This novel narrates, as do all, a story that could have happened, but the author does not attest to it having been thus.”

In other words, maybe the events happened, maybe they did not.

Along another plane, the narrative stage upon which Red April unfolds is in Ayacucho:

“Ayacucho is a strange place. The seat of the Wari culture was here, and then the Chanka people, who never allowed themselves to be subjugated by the Incas. And later were the indigenous uprisings because Ayacucho was the half-way point between Cuzco, the Inca capital, and Lima, the Spaniards’ capital. And independence in Quinua (cf., Quinua, Peru). And Sendero. This place is condemned to be bathed in blood and fire forever, Chacaltana.”(Roncagliolo, p. 245 Spanish edition).

Although there is a slight relation to the capital city, given that the main character despite having been born in the southern city, at the age of nine departed to be reared by relatives in Lima after his mother's death, but later decides to voluntarily return to his place of birth. His opinion of Lima is not very high since he considers it quite competitive, the source of popular consensus and, at the same time, full of smog, and arid gray hills in some parts. Ironically, the protagonist finds his roots planted in Ayacucho, Lima and Cuzco, the latter city being the birthplace of his estranged father and deceased mother.

== Literary fiction, folklore and anthropology ==
The novel spins thematic currents by interweaving the writer's creative story telling content of a thriller novel with the context of Andean life and world view, and the elements Pre-Columbian Incan anthropology.

=== Maternal Relationships ===
Associate District Prosecutor Félix Chacaltana Saldívar was very aware of his mother's (mamita) presence, from whom he asked for advice and consent. Likewise he held eerie conversations with her in the ancestral estate, perhaps, of her refurbished home, despite her being dead, as a sort of intermediary of the past and the present in a modern form of Incan ancestor worship, an important element in Andean life. Perhaps his consciousness of her may be due, as will come to light, to the fact that he did not rescue her from the house fire that cost his mother her life.

One may also note the desperation of certain mothers upon the disappearance of their sons. In Red April, the mother of Edwin Mayta Carazo was always present at the opening of burial pits in hopes of finding her son's body.

=== Paternal Relationships ===
The relationship between the protagonist and his father is extremely distant since Chacaltana assures that he never met his father and neither did he ever inquire about him. It's almost as if he never had had a father. It later becomes known that his father exhibited violent behavior toward his mother and Félix as a child, and who would later wind up threatening him. It is through the eyes of Commander Carrión, who bears uncanny witness to an unusual wealth of detail of the protagonist's childhood, that Chacaltana comes to reveal the nature of his early relationship with his father. He is reminded of the childhood psychological horror in hand-written notes penned in crayon and fractured syntax—in stark contrast to the pedantically precise legal briefs and reports Associate District Prosecutor Félix Chacaltana Saldívar strives to produce—that the killer(s) ostensibly composes after each murder and are strung out over the novel's trajectory, which are accidentally spilled from a briefcase belonging to a prime suspect.
