= Paulina Gaitán =

Mexican actress (born 1992)

Paulina Gaitán Ruiz
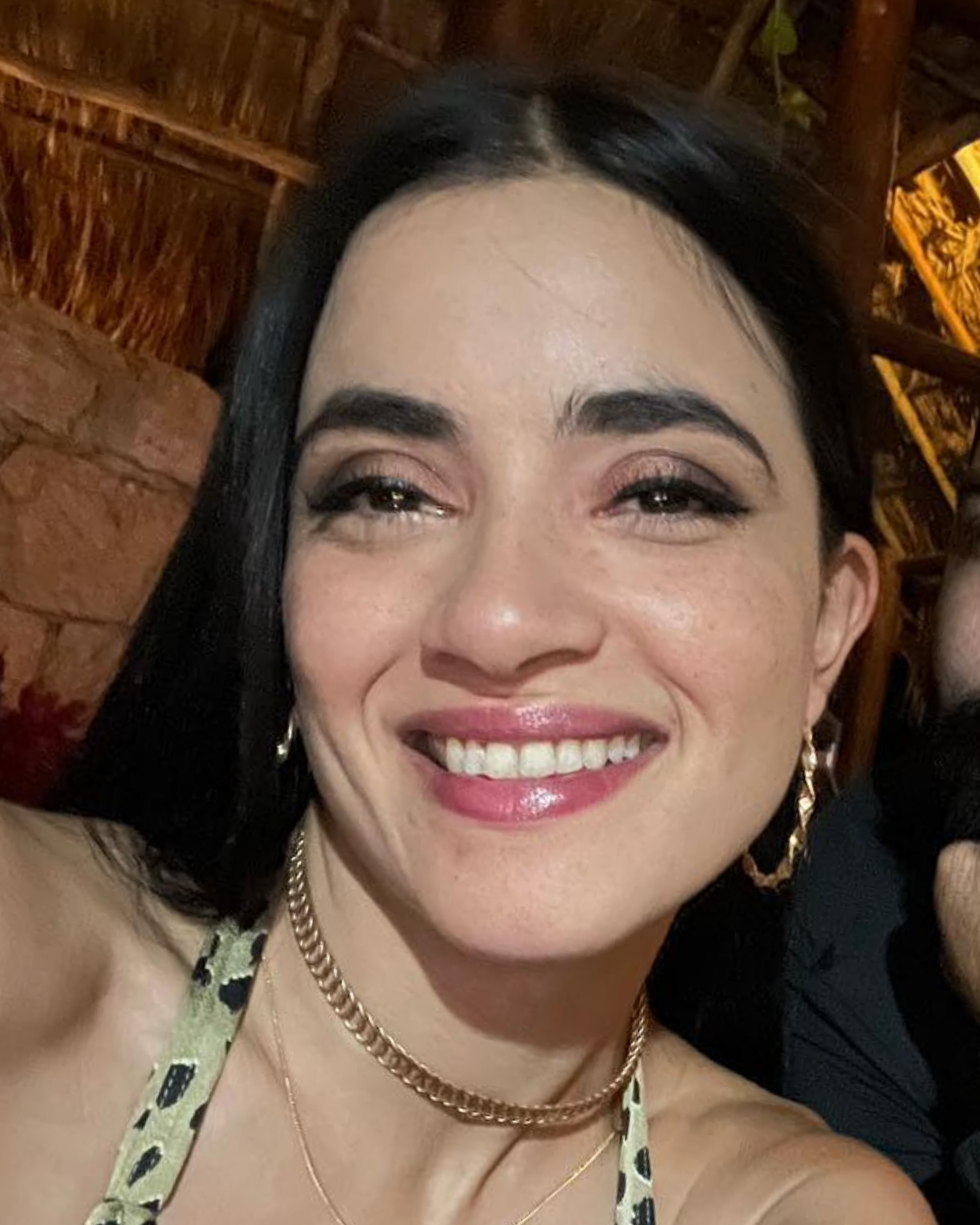
- Gaitán in 2024
- Born: Paulina Gaitán Ruiz; 19 February 1992 (age 34); Villahermosa, Tabasco, Mexico
- Occupation: Actress
- Years active: 2004–present

Paulina Gaitán Ruiz (born 19 February 1992) is a Mexican actress. She is best known throughout Mexican television and movies. She is more recently known for her role in the popular Netflix series, Narcos, as the devoted young wife of Colombian drug kingpin Pablo Escobar.

== Biography ==
Paulina Gaitán was born in Villahermosa. Gaitán started acting at age 9 and at the age of 12 had an important role in Mexican director Luis Mandoki's Innocent Voices, a tale about the civil war in El Salvador.

She was the lead in the Cary Joji Fukunaga film Sin Nombre, where she played the character of Sayra, who joins her father and uncle when they try to migrate from Honduras to the United States, and ends up travelling with El Casper, a gang member, played by actor Edgar Flores.

Gaitán also played a girl kidnapped by sex traffickers in the 2007 movie Trade alongside Kevin Kline. She portrayed Sabina, a lead role in the Mexican horror drama We Are What We Are (Somos Lo Que Hay) in 2010. In addition, she has played the role of Zuvely in the short film En Tus Manos, which was also released in 2010.

In 2012, Gaitán starred in the ensemble cast of the ABC Steven Spielberg series The River. Since 2015, she has starred in the Netflix original series Narcos as Tata, the wife of narcoterrorist Pablo Escobar. In 2018, she began starring as Violetta, the lead in the Amazon Prime Original Series Diablo Guardián.

== Filmography ==
=== Films ===
Year	Title	Role	Notes
2004	Animales en peligro		Voice
2004	Voces inocentes	Angelita	
2006	Morirse en domingo	Isabel	
2007	Trade	Adriana	
2007	Cuando las cosas suceden	Fernanda	
2007	Cielo	Cielo	Television film
2008	Insignificant Things	Esmeralda	Nominated – Ariel Award for Best Actress
2009	Sin nombre	Sayra	
2009	Codicia	Julia	Short film
2009	La mitad del mundo	Paulina	
2010	En tus manos	Zuvely	Short film
2010	We Are What We Are	Sabina	
2011	La cebra	Valentina	
2011	Inocencia	Gaby	Short film
2011	Días de gracia	Camila	
2011	El Bukanas	Ashley	
2012	Matilde	Gaby	Short film
2012	Las paredes hablan	Lupe	
2012	Hermanas	Luz	Short film
2013	Deseo	Adolescente	
2013	Ni aquí ni allá		Short film
2014	Cuatro lunas	Rosita in Telenovela	Voice
2014	Eddie Reynolds y los ángeles de acero	Natalia	
2015	Crossing point	Lucille	Associate producer
2015	Las Aparicio	Rafaela Primera	
2015	Ruta Madre	Colette	
2018	The Good Girls	Ana Paula	Nominated – Ariel Award for Best Supporting Actress
2019	Souvenir	Isabel	
2020	Territorio	Lupe	
2022	Me Casé Con Un Idiota	Flor	
2024	City of Dreams	Maria	
2024	Turno nocturno	Rebecca García	

=== Television ===
Year	Title	Role	Notes
2005	Mujer, casos de la vida real		Episode: "Los pasos de mamá"
2010	Las Aparicio	Ileana Delacroix	
2010	Capadocia	Andrea Marín	
2012	The River	Jahel Valenzuela	
2013	Sr. Ávila	Juliana Rivas	
2015	Señorita Pólvora	Noemí "Beretta"	Co-lead role
2015-16	Narcos	Tata Escobar	
2018	Señora Acero	Leticia Moreno	Season 5
2018	Diablo Guardián	Violetta	Main role; 18 episodes
2020	El Presidente	María Inés "Nené" Facuse	Main role; 8 episodes
2021	Before I Forget		Main role
2022	Belascoarán, PI	Irene	
2025	Coyotl, Hero and Beast	Jenni	
2025	The Dead Girls	Serafina Baladro	Lead role
2026	El Mochaorejas	Lucía	
2026	La Banda	Marcela	
