= El Mochaorejas (TV series) =

- Genre: Crime drama
- Written by: Javier Van de Couter; Jacques Bonnavent
- Directed by: Mauricio Cruz Fortunato
- Starring: Damián Alcázar; Paulina Gaitán
- Country of origin: Mexico
- Original language: Spanish
- No. of seasons: 1
- No. of episodes: 8

Production
- Executive producers: Carlos Bardasano; Jorge Bermúdez
- Cinematography: Andrés León Becker
- Editor: Sam Baixauli
- Camera setup: Multi-camera
- Production company: The Mall

Original release
- Network: Vix
- Release: 23 January 2026

El Mochaorejas is a Mexican crime drama television series about the life of serial killer Daniel Arizmendi López, nicknamed "El Mochaorejas" ("The Ear Chopper"), based on an investigation by journalist Olga Wornat. Damián Alcázar stars as Arizmendi López, alongside Paulina Gaitán.

== Cast ==
=== Main ===
- Damián Alcázar as Daniel Arizmendi López
- Paulina Gaitán as Lucía

=== Recurring and guest stars ===
- Julio Bracho as Wilfrido Robledo
- Sonia Couoh as Eugenia
- Armando Espitia as El Niño
- Oka Giner as Diana
- María Antonieta Hidalgo as Eva Luna
- Armando Hernández as Ramiro
- Alfredo Herrera as Malcolm
- Enoc Leaño as Salas
- Arcelia Ramírez as Emilia Bermejo
- Fernando Rebeil as Antonio Silva
- Marco Treviño as Manuel Silva
- Manuel Cruz Vivas as Pedro
- Mayra Batalla as Cecilia
- Jorge Briseño as Ramón
- María Chacón as Ana
- Norman Delgadillo as Carlos
- Ianis Guerrero as Pablo
- José Concepción Macías as Edgardo
- Alex Perea as Chaneque
- Valeria Rojas as Sandra
- Edison Ruiz as Alfonso
- Ángel Salomón as Daniel Jr.
- Gustavo Sánchez Parra as Artemio
- Edmundo Velarde as Osiel
- Giovanna Zacarías as María Luisa
- Jorge Zárate as Rolando
- Alberto Estrella as Enrique Arizmendi
- Ariana Saavedra as Areli Morán
- Fermín Martínez as Agent Frías
- José Sefami as Herrera
- Juan Carlos Barreto as Señor Cava
- Emilio Guerrero as Nicolás
- Claudia Ramírez as Juliana Rivera
- Scarlet Gruber as Carla
- Erika de la Rosa as Mabel

== Episodios ==
No.	Title	Original release date
1	"El principio del fin parte 1"	23 January 2026
2	"El principio del fin parte 2"	23 January 2026
3	"Compasión"	23 January 2026
4	"Las flores del bien, las flores del mal"	23 January 2026
5	"La princesa en el infierno"	23 January 2026
6	"Secretos de familia"	23 January 2026
7	"NN"	23 January 2026
8	"Puede ser cualquiera"	23 January 2026
