= Patricio Pron =

Argentine writer and literary critic (born 1975)

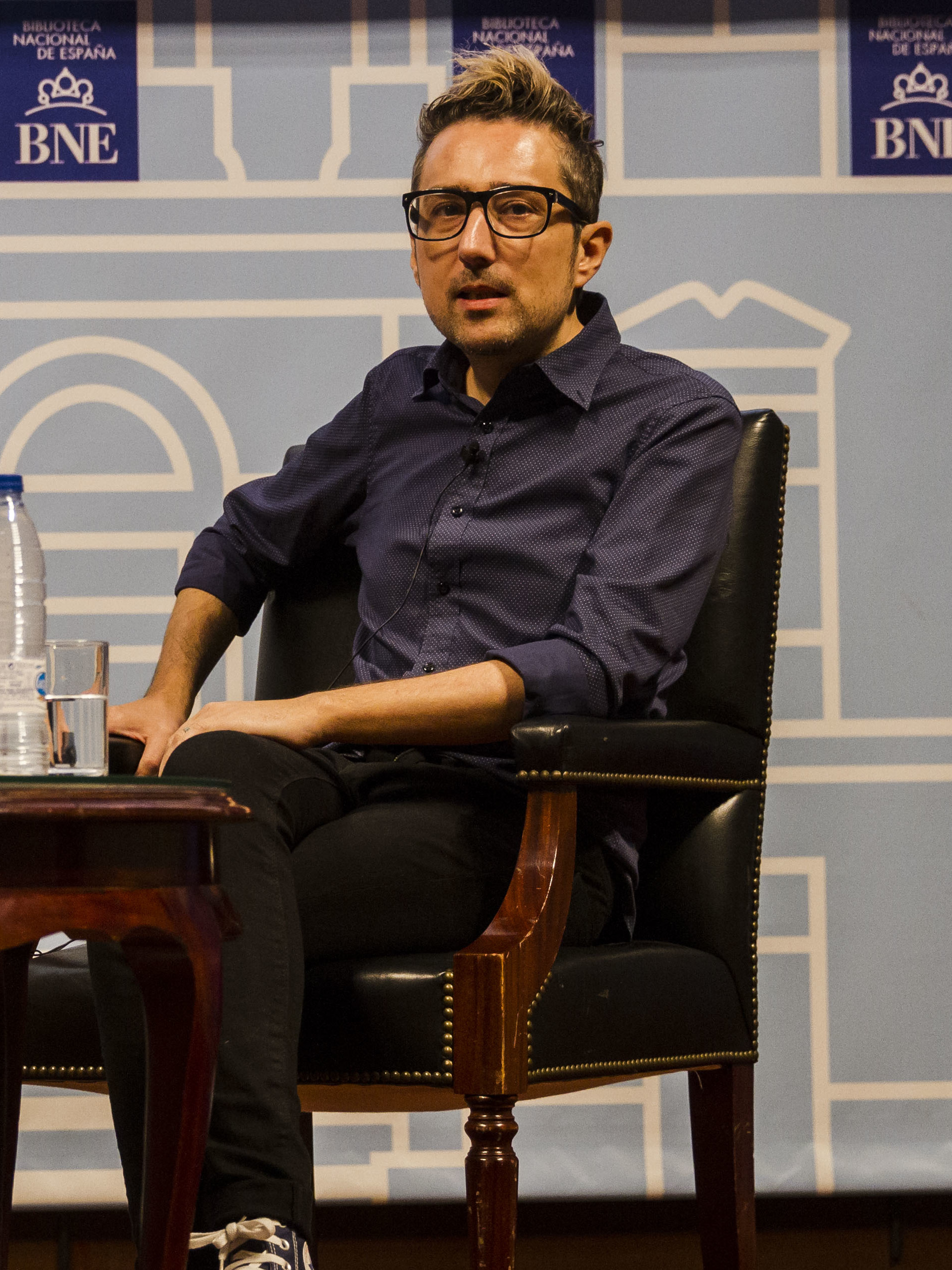
- Born: December 9, 1975 (age 50); Rosario, Argentina
- Education: National University of Rosario; University of Göttingen
- Occupations: Writer and literary critic
- Years active: 1992–present
- Notable work: Mañana tendremos otros nombres (2019)
- Awards: Alfaguara Novel Prize
- Website: patriciopron.com

Patricio Pron (born December 9, 1975) is an Argentine writer and literary critic translated into a dozen languages including English, German, French and Italian. Granta magazine selected him in 2010 as one of the 22 best young writers in Spanish of his generation. He won the twenty-second Alfaguara Novel Prize in 2019 for his work Mañana tendremos otros nombres among other prizes.

== Life and career ==
Pron was born in Rosario, Argentina. He holds a degree in Social Communication from the National University of Rosario and a PhD in Romanesque Philology from the University of Göttingen in Germany.

He began writing in the press in 1992. Between 2000 and 2001, he toured Europe, the Balkans, North Africa and Turkey as a correspondent for the Rosario newspaper La Capital. He currently writes for El País cultural supplement "Babelia" and for the Spanish-Mexican magazine Letras Libres, among other publications.

Between 2002 and 2007, Pron worked as an assistant at the University of Göttingen, where he prepared his doctoral work on the narrative procedures in Copi's work. He moved to Madrid, where he currently lives.

He has won several national and international awards, including the Juan Rulfo Short Story Prize, the Cálamo Extraordinary Prize for Lifetime Achievement, the Alfaguara Prize, among others. Pron has also received the Antorchas Grant and the BBVA Foundation Grant for Researchers and Cultural Creators, as well as being a "Director's Guest" of both Civitella Ranieri and Santa Maddalena foundations. In 2010, Granta magazine selected him as one of the twenty-two best Spanish-language writers of his generation.

Pron is renowned for his innovative literary style and his ability to tackle complex subjects with depth and originality. His works have been published by leading national and international publishers and literary magazines. As a literary critic, he stands out for his ability to relate contemporary literature, culture and society and for his questioning gaze.

Since September 2024, he has been a fellow at The Dorothy and Lewis B. Cullman Center for Scholars and Writers of the New York Public Library.

== Works ==
=== Short stories ===
- Hombres infames, Bajo la Luna Nueva, 1999
- El vuelo magnífico de la noche, Colihue, Buenos Aires, 2001
- El mundo sin las personas que lo afean y lo arruinan, Mondadori, Barcelona, 2010
- Trayéndolo todo de regreso a casa. Relatos 1990-2010, El Cuervo, La Paz, 2011
- La vida interior de las plantas de interior, Mondadori, 2013
- Lo que está y no se usa nos fulminará, Literatura Random House, Barcelona, 2018

=== Novels ===
- Formas de morir, Rosario: Universidad Nacional de Rosario Editora, 1998
- Nadadores muertos, Editorial Municipal de Rosario, 2001
- Una puta mierda, Buenos Aires: El cuenco de plata, 2007
- El comienzo de la primavera, Barcelona: Mondadori, 2008
- El espíritu de mis padres sigue subiendo en la lluvia, Barcelona: Mondadori, 2011
  - English translation: My Father's Ghost is Climbing in the Rain, Knopf, 2013
- Nosotros caminamos en sueños, Barcelona: Literatura Random House, 2014
- No derrames tus lágrimas por nadie que viva en estas calles, Barcelona: Literatura Random House, 2016
- Mañana tendremos otros nombres, Barcelona: Alfaguara, 2019
- La naturaleza secreta de las cosas de este mundo, Editorial Anagrama, 2023
- En todo hay una grieta y por ella entra la luz, Anagrama, 2026

=== Others ===
- Zerfurchtes Land. Neue Erzählungen aus Argentinien (Tierra devastada. Nuevos relatos desde Argentina), organizer, with Burkhard Pohl
- El libro tachado. Prácticas de la negación y el silencio en la crisis de la literatura, Turner, Madrid, 2014
- Traumbuch, Delirio, Salamanca, 2022
- No, no pienses en un conejo blanco: Literatura, dinero, tiempo, falsificación, crítica, futuro, CSIC, 2022
- Pron vs. Prompt. ¿Puede la inteligencia artificial competir ya con un escritor?, Delirio, 2025
