= Manuel Vicent =

Spanish writer

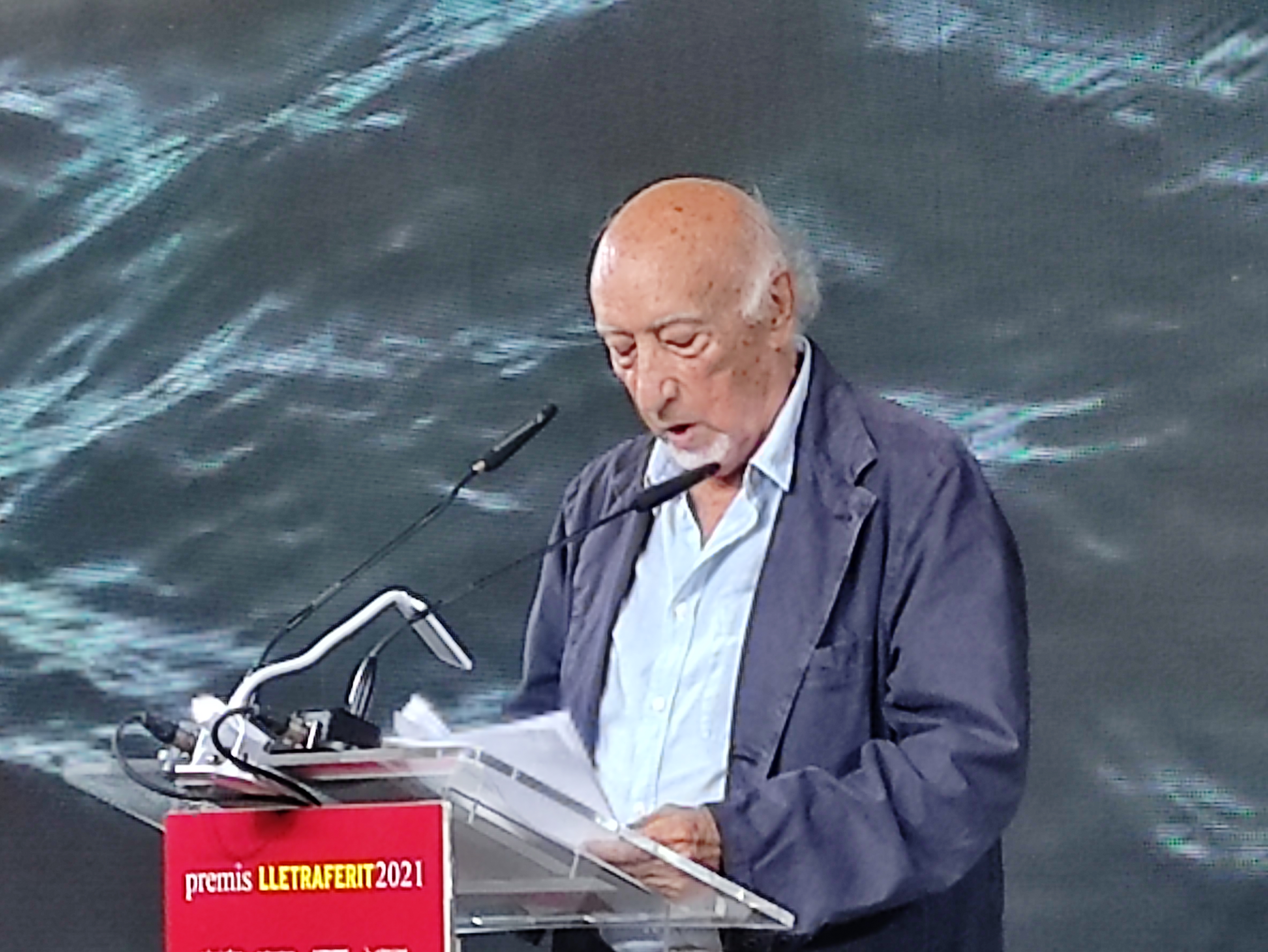
- Manuel Vicent in 2021
- Born: 10 March 1936 (age 90); La Vilavella, Castellón
- Education: Universidad de Valencia
- Occupations: Writer and author
- Awards: Premio Nadal (1986); Premio Alfaguara (1996)

Manuel Vicent (born 10 March 1936) is a Spanish writer. He was born in La Vilavella, Castellón and studied philosophy and law at the University of Valencia. A prolific author, he has written more than 40 books. He has won several literary prizes, including the Premio Nadal and the Premio Alfaguara, which he won twice.

== Prizes ==
- 1966: Premio Alfaguara de Novela, for Pascua y naranjas
- 1979: Premio González-Ruano, for No pongas tus sucias manos sobre Mozart
- 1986: Premio Nadal, for Balada de Caín
- 1994: Premio Francisco Cerecedo
- 1999: Premio Alfaguara de Novela, for Son de mar
