= Luis Leante =

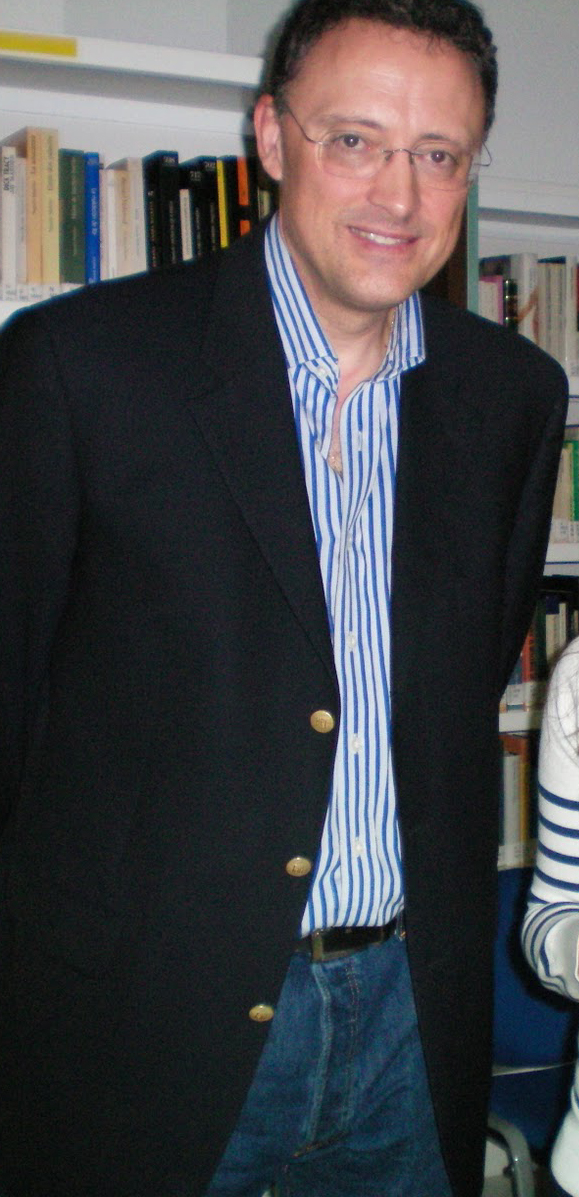
- Born: June 6, 1963 (age 63); Caravaca de la Cruz (Region of Murcia)
- Citizenship: Alicante, Spain
- Education: Classical philology
- Occupations: Latin professor, Novelist
- Writing career
- Period: 1983-
- Notable work: Mira si yo te querré (See How Much I Love You)
- Notable awards: Premio Alfaguara (2007)
- Website: luisleante.blogspot.com

Luis Ramón Leante Chacón (born June 6, 1963, Caravaca de la Cruz), commonly known as Luis Leante, is a Spanish novelist and Latin professor.

Leante graduated in Classical Philology from the University of Murcia. He has lived in Alicante since 1992, where he worked as a high school teacher until 2009. He published his first novel at the age of 20, but it was not until 2007, after winning the Alfaguara Prize with his novel See How Much I Love You (in Spanish, Mira si yo te querré), that he began to devote himself entirely to literature. Another of his novels, Red Moon (in Spanish, La luna roja), published in Spain in 2009, is a gripping story between a writer and translator, set in Alicante, Berlin and Istanbul.

== Bibliography ==
=== Novels ===
- Camino del jueves rojo (1983).
- Paisaje con río y Baracoa de fondo (1997).
- Al final del trayecto (1997).
- La Edad de Plata (1998).
- El canto del zaigú (2000).
- El vuelo de las termitas (2003).
- Academia Europa (2003).
- Mira si yo te querré (2007; tr: See How Much I Love You).
- La Luna Roja (2009; tr: Red Moon).
- Cárceles imaginarias (2012).
- Annobón (2017).

=== Short stories ===
- El último viaje de Efraín (1986).
- El criador de canarios (1996).

=== Children's Novels ===
- La puerta trasera del paraíso (2007).
- Rebelión en Nueva Granada (2008).
- Justino Lumbreras detective privado (2012).
- Justino Lumbreras y el fantasma del museo (2012).
- Justino Lumbreras y el collar de Cleopatra (2013).
- Justino Lumbreras y el Gran Caruso (2013).
- Huye sin mirar atrás (2016).
- Maneras de vivir (2020).
