= Carla Guelfenbein =

Chilean writer

Carla Guelfenbein Dobry
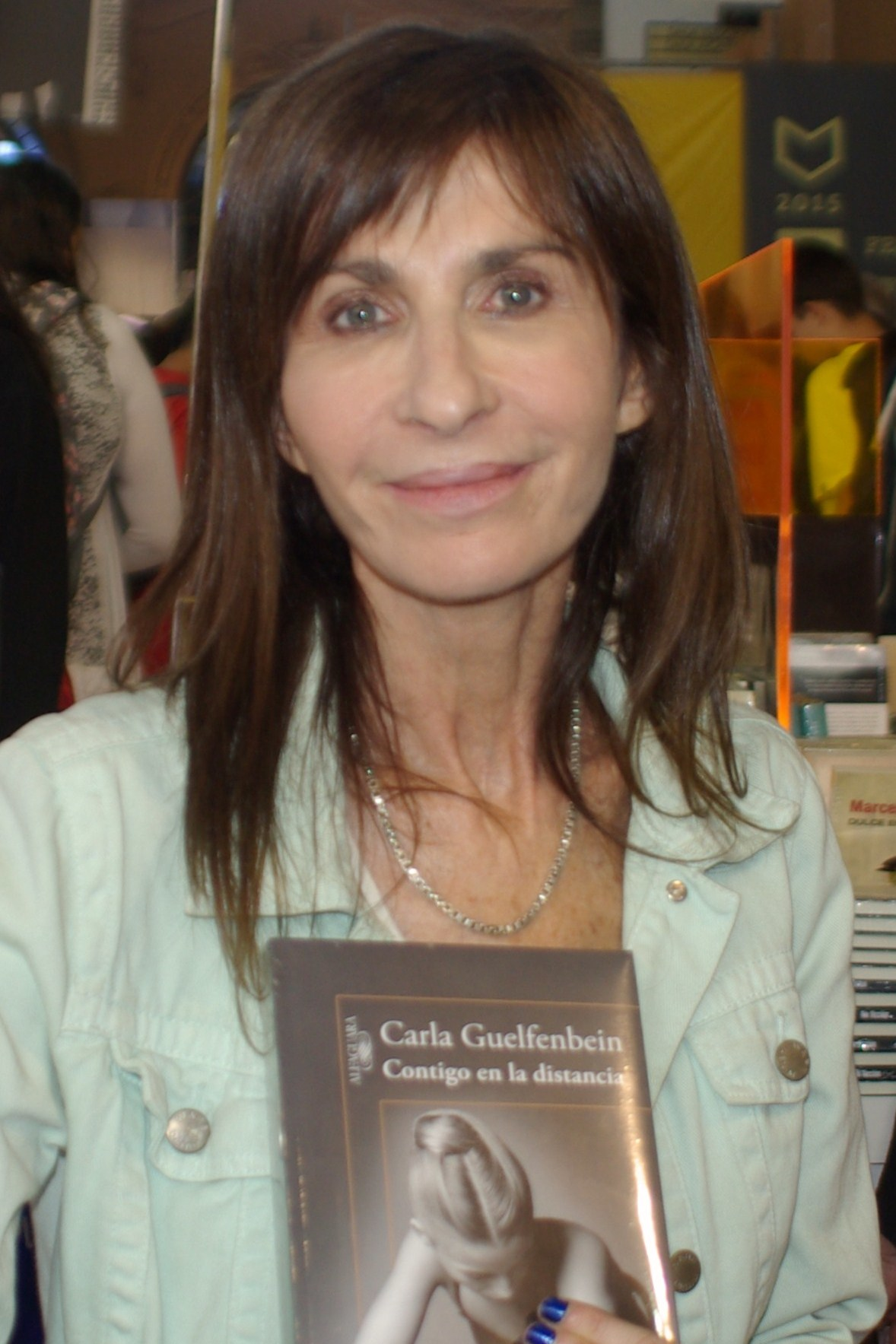
- Guelfenbein at FILSA, 2015
- Born: November 30, 1959 (63 years old); Santiago, Chile
- Occupation: Writer
- Children: Micaela Altamirano Guelfenbein, Carlos Sebastián Altamirano Guelfenbein
- Writing career
- Genre: Novel
- Notable work: Contigo en la distancia
- Notable awards: Alfaguara Novel Prize 2015

Carla Guelfenbein Dobry (born November 30, 1959) is a Chilean writer, winner of the Alfaguara Novel Prize in 2015 for her book Contigo en la distancia. Guelfenbein has published eight novels; The most recent one is called La naturaleza del deseo and it was published in 2022.

== Early life and education ==
Carla Guelfenbein Dobry was born in Santiago, Chile, in 1959. She is of Russian-Jewish origin. She was exiled with her parents to England in 1976 as a result of the military coup of September 11, 1973 which meant the fall of the Popular Unity government. Her house had been raided and her mother, Eliana Dobry, professor of philosophy at the University of Chile and socialist militant, was detained by Pinochet's agents; her whereabouts were unknown for three weeks.

She had anorexia at the age of 17 and at the age of 18, her mother died of cancer.

She studied biology at University of Essex (specialty: population genetics) in United Kingdom and design at St Martin's School of Art, today Central Saint Martins College of Art and Design in London.

== Career ==
Guelfenbein has worked in various jobs related to creativity, being a designer for advertising agencies and art director in fashion magazines. She was art director and fashion editor at Elle magazine in Chile. She is a regular contributor to several mass media where she has a column titled Tan lejos, tan cerca in the Sunday magazine Mujer of La Tercera and has conducted a literature workshop.

She started publishing in a little late way, when she was already 40 years old. Since then, her work has achieved considerable success within Chile and throughout her career she has been translated into more than 14 languages.

The author has always presented characters that are part of that struggle that women have had in the society.

She attended to the literary workshops of Pía Barros and Gonzalo Contreras. She affirms that she began to write and read in her childhood.

Siempre escribí. Siempre para mí la escritura fue un lugar al que acudía constantemente, un refugio. Desde los nueve años más o menos empecé a escribir y a leer mucho también. Eso es algo que se lo debo a mi madre, ella es una profesora de Filosofía de la universidad y de ella aprendí a leer, ella guiaba mis lecturas, yo creo que eso me hizo una gran lectora

— Carla Guelfenbein
Translation:

I always wrote. Always for me, writing was a place I went to constantly, a refuge. From the age of nine more or less I started writing and reading a lot too. That is something I owe to my mother, she is a Philosophy professor at the university and from her I learned to read, she guided my readings, I think that made me a great reader

— Carla Guelfenbein

She started to write prematurely, but she published her first novel, The reverse of the soul, in 2002, followed three years later by The woman of my life (chosen as the best novel of the year by the readers of El Mercurio) in 2008 her third book came out, The rest is silence. Her stories have appeared in various mass media, including the newspapers El País and El Mercurio. She also participated, along with other Spanish-speaking authors, in an anthology of commemorative stories of the five years of the Punto de Lectura seal.

In 2012, she published her fourth novel, Nadar desnudas, whose storyline goes by the time of the Popular Unity and the months after Pinochet's coup.

Contigo en la distancia, become the winner of a total of 707 manuscripts received for the award. Of these, 320 came from Spain, 106 from Mexico, 102 from Argentina, 77 from Colombia, 41 from the United States, 32 from Peru, 20 from Chile and 9 from Uruguay.

She is one of the most popular Chilean writers and her books have repeatedly appeared on the best-seller lists in Chile and have been translated into several languages; for example, The woman of my life has been published in 14 languages, with a good reception from both readers and critics alike.

== Personal life ==
Carla Guelfenbein returned to Chile in 1987, and currently resides in Santiago.

She has two children – Micaela Altamirano Guelfenbein (1994) and Carlos Sebastián Altamirano Guelfenbein (1997) of her marriage with Juan Carlos Altamirano Celis, a former Programming Manager of TVN 2005 and son of the socialist leader Carlos Altamirano Orrego. However, she is currently separated.

== Novels ==
- The reverse of the soul, novel, Alfaguara, Santiago, 2002
- The woman of my life, novel, Alfaguara, Santiago, 2005
- The rest is silence, novel, Planeta, Santiago, 2008
- Nadar desnudas, novela, Alfaguara, Santiago, 2012 (The International Literary Quarterly had advanced chapter 14 in its Nº12, October 2010)
- Contigo en la distancia, novel, Alfaguara, Santiago, 2015
- Take me to heaven, novel, Cloud of Ink, Santiago, 2018
- The Station of Women, novel, Alfaguara, Santiago, 2019

== Awards ==
- Alfaguara Novel Prize 2015 for Contigo en la Distancia.
