= Laura Restrepo =

Colombian author (born 1950)

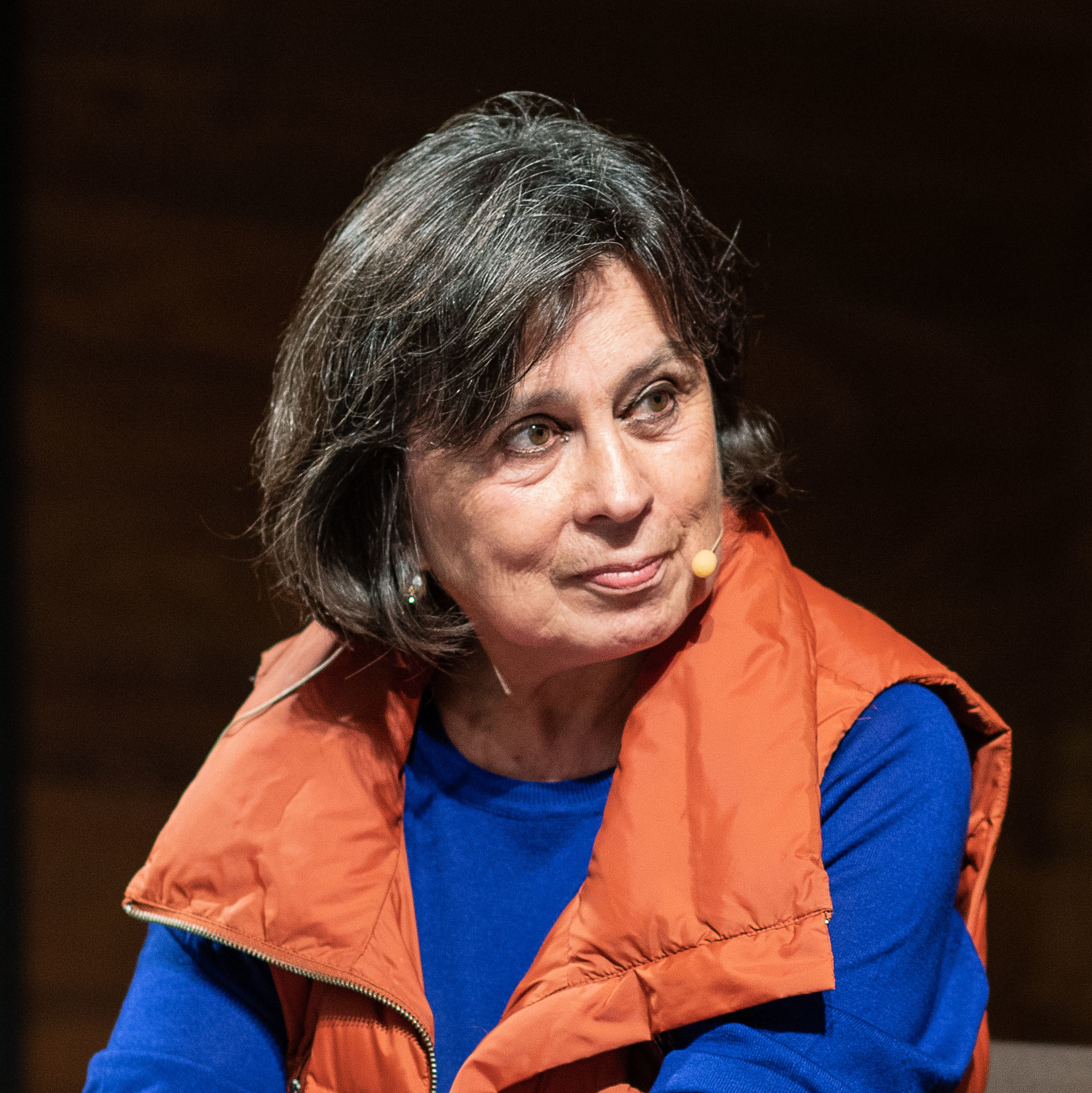
- Restrepo at Literaktum literary festival 2018
- Born: 1950 (age 75–76); Bogotá, Colombia
- Occupation: Novelist
- Writing career
- Genres: Mix of reality and fiction

Laura Restrepo (born 1950 in Bogotá, Colombia) is a Colombian author who began writing what were mainly political columns in her mid-twenties. Her first novel, Isle of Passion, is based on historical deeds that occurred on Clipperton Island.

== Early life ==
Laura Restrepo is the older of two sisters. Her grandfather was self-educated and spoke six languages. Her father left school age of 13 to go out to work before becoming a businessman. According to Restrepo, her father would take her and her mother with him on his business travels and they never stayed long enough in one place to attend a full year of school. Once she attended a public school in California for only one day because her father took the family somewhere else the next day. When she was around ten years old her formal education consisted of six months at a ceramics night school in Denmark. When she and her family went to Madrid the school did not accept her because she failed the required admission tests for arithmetic, grammar, sewing, and embroidery. So instead, she went to a flamenco guitar teacher. Her father took her to visit museums, theaters, ruins, and to climb volcanoes and watch geysers. He introduced her to composers such as Bartók, Prokofiev and Stravinsky. By the time she was 14 she was reading books but did not know the full multiplication table.

She moved back to Colombia age fifteen where she had to work hard to earn a high school degree as she had not taken the required subjects previously but in spite of this, she was able to obtain her diploma. She was the first person in her father's family to receive a diploma. Soon after she got her diploma, she enrolled at the University of the Andes, Colombia. In her second year in college, at the age of 16, she wrote "that beyond the nuclear family and the land of wonders that is high culture, there lay a whole universe to be explored that was broad and remote, fierce and exciting." She cut her ties to her father and never saw him again before his death a few years later. She gave up her teaching job and got involved in Colombian politics before joining the Socialist Workers Party in Spain, then soon went to Argentina for four years where she was part of the underground resistance that opposed the military dictatorship. After three years with the Socialist Workers Party in Madrid she became a journalist.

== Writing career ==
Laura Restrepo began writing when she was nine years old. She began writing in love, memory, and just to get the feeling of being close to him again. She returned to Colombia after three years in the Spanish Socialist Workers Party and began writing for Semana, a magazine, in the national and international politics section. During this time, she traveled to different places including Grenada to report on the invasion and to the Nicaragua-Honduras border to report on the war between the Sandinistas and the Contras. During her time working for Semana she met Gabriel García Márquez. Although feeling lucky to be acquainted with him she also criticized him for his writing style of magic realism. Over time she became the political editor of Semana and wrote about ongoing peace negotiations. Restrepo voiced her opinions loudly over the failing peace treaties and the conflict that was going and received death threats and was forced into a six-year exile in Mexico. Many of the investigations she did end up as plots or ideas in many of her novels.

Her first novel was Isle of Passion which uses her normal style of investigative journalism and fiction to create a sense of wonder while it is being read. She wrote this novel while she was in Mexico, seeing as she missed Colombia so much, she decided to begin a story. Leopard in the Sun was Restrepo's second novel. This novel started with a story that Restrepo had been sent to cover a story about two families trying to kill each other. Eventually she finds out they were involved in the drug cartels in Colombia. She says, "she never used the word 'drugs' in the novel, because she is convinced that 'all readers read between the lines'". Dulce Compañia is a non-traditional Restrepo novel. She uses religious beings in this novel when in fact she never had formal religious training. Restrepo has won several awards for this novel.

== Political career ==
In 1982 Belisario Betancur, the president of Colombia at the time, added Restrepo to the negotiating commission to negotiate peace with the M-19 guerrillas. After Restrepo's experience as a commissioner of peace she left the field of journalism, received death threats and was forced into exile in Mexico for six years. Her book Historia de un Entusiasmo (Story of a Fascination) is written as a firsthand account from Restrepo and deals with aspects of the peace negotiations that the media had not shown.

== Other ==
Laura Restrepo graduated with a degree in philosophy from the University of the Andes, Colombia and earned a post-graduate degree in political science. She often appears as a guest speaker at political forums and universities. She was an Andrew Dickson White Professor-at-Large at Cornell University from 2007 to 2013. Her novels are widely used in academic institutions for courses ranging from humanities to social sciences. Restrepo has a son from her first marriage. She also teaches months every year at the University of Seville. When she is not teaching, she is usually writing and speaking at academic institutions or forums.

== General writing style ==
Laura Restrepo tried to find a style of writing that fit her, eventually developing a mix of reality and fiction to create a style she calls "report style". In her work, she uses history and investigative journalism woven together. Restrepo says, "I needed a formula that would allow me to slightly violate the verifiable facts so that my personal interpretation would not be offensive, and this explains the dual character of the chapters, some strictly investigative, others with license to lie a little." In basic terms, she wrote political non-fiction.

=== Plot and setting ===
Restrepo places most of her novels in Colombia during times of political struggle, though her recent 2012 novel Hot Sur is set in the United States, albeit its main protagonist is a Colombian woman. She intertwines mystery, love, and relationships to capture the interest of her readers. She writes about the daily struggle to survive in a country where society is damaged by war and corruption. Her novels have at least one obstacle to overcome where the main character must show strong will in order to battle their obstacles; however, sometimes it is easier for them to do so with help from a loved one.

=== Influences and themes ===
Laura Restrepo's biggest influences are those that were important to her father. In an interview with Jaime Manrique she recounted how her father read her stories from these authors. William Saroyan, John Steinbeck, and Nikos Kazantzakis are some of her most important influences. She explains that these authors are ones that are concerned with the dignity of others, the ability to show empathy even though times are tough, and "the solidarity and ironbound links of clan." Restrepo uses a theme of tragedy in many of her novels.

== Works ==
- Story of a Fascination (Historia de un Entusiasmo) (1986) This novel is Restrepo's experience during the government/guerrilla conflict. This novel speaks of President Belisario Betancur and her own struggle with death threats and 5 years of exile. Because she was involved in negotiating peace between the two groups in 1983, this gives a firsthand account of what was going on and how everyone was going to change the world.
- Isle of Passion (Isla de la pasión) (1989) Set in the early 1900s during the Mexican Revolution and World War I, the novel narrates the story of Ramón Arnaud, his wife Alicia, and many soldiers from the Mexican military who making their lives on small and barren Clipperton Island in the Pacific. The group starts their lives on the island until the revolution and World War I leave them without any supplies. Bad weather happens and Alicia and Tirsa, a lieutenant's wife, are left to lead the survivors. Restrepo based this novel on a true story.
- The Cows Eat Spaghetti (Las vacas comen espaguetis) (1989) (for children)
- Leopard in the Sun (El Leopardo al Sol: Novela) (1993) Based on events from her home country of Colombia, this story tells about a war between two families that let criminal money get the best of them These two families were involved in the Colombian drug trade. One by one the males in each family are murdered. After four decades only a few men are still living. Restrepo uses a singular narrative with interruptions from others. Family hierarchy, destruction of sudden wealth, and the difference between fact and fiction are the issues that arise in this novel.
- The Angel of Galilea (Dulce Compañía) (1995) This is a different type of novel for Restrepo. She uses religion and comedy in this novel, unlike her traditional tragic novels. This story follows Mona, who goes to report on a story about people seeing an angel in Galilea, which is a slummy part of the city. She falls in love with the angel but ends up realizing that she wants a common man as a soul mate, not an angel. Multiple things happen that cause people to speculate that this angel is real. Chaos breaks out and the novel has folkloric, feminist, spiritual and political themes in it.
- The Dark Bride (La Novia Oscura: Novela) (1999) A journalist investigates a small Colombian town populated by mainly "oil riggers and the prostitutes who service them." The journalist interviews some of the townspeople of Tora to learn about Sayonara, a well-known prostitute who is the daughter of a white man and a Guahibo woman. She is in charge of La Catunga, the place where employees of the Tropical Oil Company "visit" prostitutes. Sayonara falls in love with two workers—Sacramento, whom she loves only as a brother, and Payanes as a lover. However, Payanes is married, and Sacramento wants to save Sayonara from prostitution. Her love story surfaces through the townspeople and the journalistic style that the narrator takes.
- A Tale of the Dispossessed (La Multitud Errante: Novela) (2001) Set in Tora, Colombia, an unnamed narrator works in a convent sheltering refugees. She offers room and board to one of the men, named Three Sevens, and falls in love with him. However, she must compete with the woman Three Sevens is searching for—Matilde Lina, the woman who saved and raised him. The two were forced apart during the Little War when he was only a teenager and he is now desperately trying to find her. This is the beginning of a love triangle that takes place during a time when people are forced to relocate and can only search for a "promise land."
- The Scent of Invisible Roses (Olor a rosas invisibles) (2002) This is a nostalgic love story between a wealthy Colombian named Luicé and a beautiful Chilean named Eloísa. They fall in love on a trip to Egypt but are soon forced apart by their parents. After several decades of separation, Eloísa, now a widow, contacts Luicé, who is still married. They begin secretly talking and eventually meet again. Restrepo shows that love is true even if it is forbidden.
- Delirium (Delirio) (2004) Aguilar, an unemployed professor, finds his wife, Agustina, in a state of madness when he returns home after a four days trip with his children. While he searches for answers to save Agustina, he learns vague secrets about her past. The novel probes into the minds of four characters: Aguilar, Agustina, Midas (Agustina's past lover), and Nicolás (Agustina's grandfather). Through all four parts in the novel, the reader unearths the beginning of Agustina's delirium.
- Demasiados héroes (Too Many Heroes) (2009) (Spanish) In this novel, Restrepo explores the Argentinean dictatorship of the late seventies. The main characters are Lorenza, a Colombian, and Mateo, her son. The novel has several layers of storytelling taking place all at once: The present moment, when mother and son travel to Buenos Aires to find Mateo's father Ramón, an Argentinean militant who left them when Mateo was a toddler. At the same time, Lorenza recounts to Mateo both the stories of the split between her and Ramon as well as their love story. Because Ramón had taken Mateo to try to bring Lorenza back after the break-up, the now adolescent boy is left wondering who really is the man behind all of his mother's stories. The novel shows the differences between the worldview of the characters and attempts to paint a picture from the inside of the movement of those who were resisting the dictatorship. Some of the novel is based on Restrepo's own memories.
- Hot Sur (2013). Set in the United States.

=== As a co-author ===
- Operation Prince (Operación Príncipe) (1988)
- En qué momento se jodió Medellín (1991)
- Love and Fire (Del amor y del fuego) (1991)
- Other Children (Otros niños) (1993)

== Honors and prizes ==
In 1997, Restrepo won the Sor Juana Inés de la Cruz Prize at the Guadalajara International Book Fair for her novel The Angel of Galilea. In 2002 she won the Arzobispo San Clemente Award for her novel Leopard in the Sun. In 2004 Restrepo won the VII Premio Alfaguara de Novela for Delirium. She won the Grinzane Cavour Prize in Italy for best foreign fiction in 2006. In 2007 she won the Guggenheim Foundation Fellowship. Her novel Dulce Compañía won the Prix France Culture in France.
