= Héctor Vázquez-Azpiri =

Héctor Vázquez-Azpiri (born 1931) is a Spanish writer. He was born in Oviedo, and studied at Oviedo University and in Madrid.

In July 1951 he was kidnapped in Celorio, Llanes, where he was vacationing, by the bandit Bernabé, an event that he deals with in his first novel, Víbora (1955). The novel was a finalist for the Nadal Award. An indefatigable traveler, he worked in various trades and returned to literature ten years later with another novel, La arrancarada (1965), which was followed by La navaja (1965), Fauna (1967, Alfaguara Award), Juego of bobos (1972) and Corrido de Vale Otero (1974). He was a correspondent for the Cuban magazine Carteles and the Mexican magazine Visión, as well as sports writer for the magazine Tiempo and a contributor to Televisión Española.
