= Xavier Velasco =

Mexican writer (born 1964)

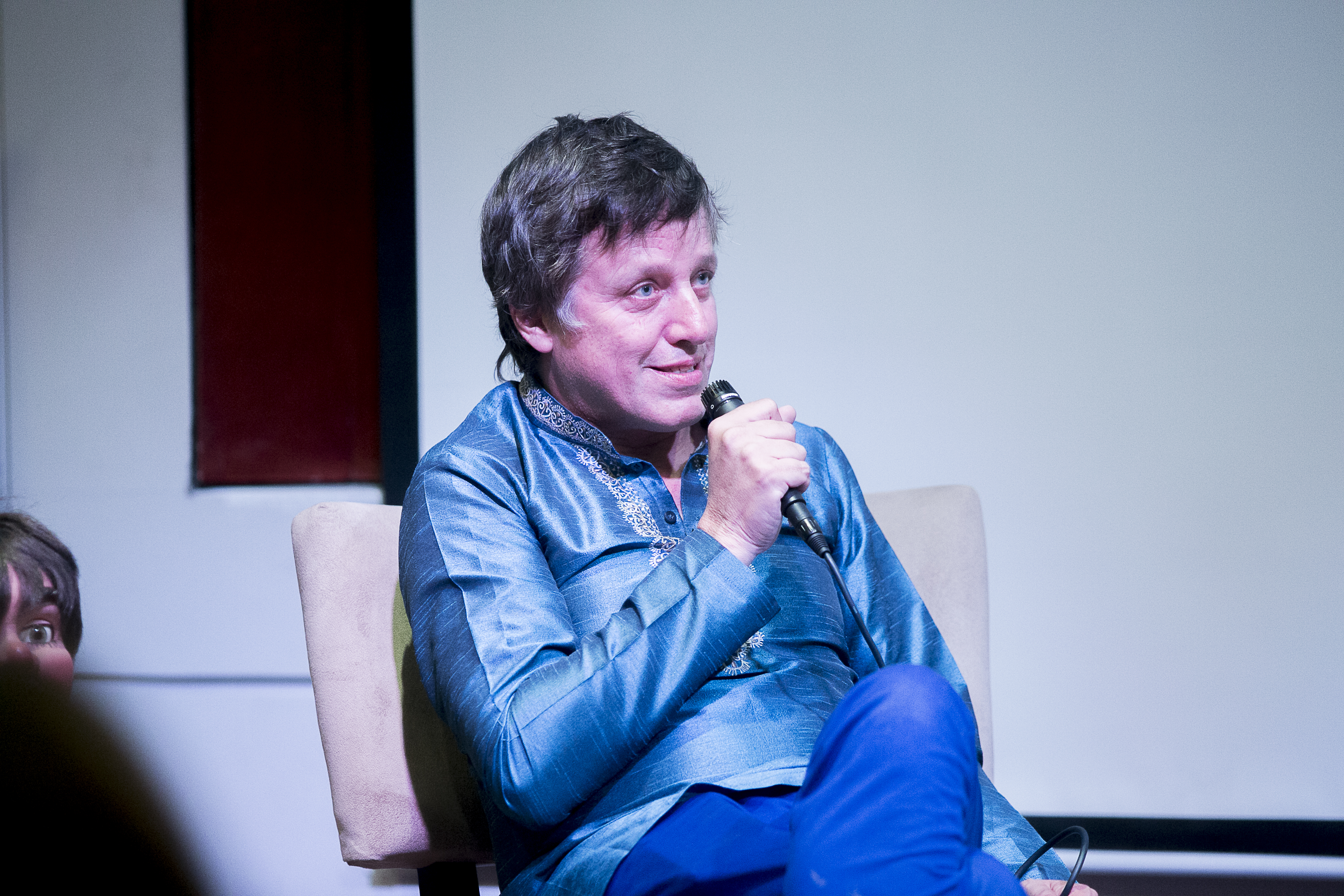
- Born: 1964 (age 61–62); Mexico City
- Writing career
- Notable work: Diablo Guardián
- Notable awards: Premio Alfaguara

Xavier Velasco (born 1964) is a Mexican writer. He was born in Mexico City. He won the 2003 Premio Alfaguara for his novel Diablo Guardián.
