= Azul Violeta =

Mexican band

Azul Violeta is a Mexican band that was formed in 1988 in Guadalajara, Jalisco, by Hugo Rodríguez and César "Vampiro" López. Mixing funk and soul, these Latin rockers were signed by EMI in 1994 with the following line up: Hugo Rodríguez, Alex Pèrez, Yuri González, Iván González and César López "El Vampiro", Juan Carlos Chavez. They had an American release, produced in England by Richard Blair.

That record, América, was promoted with a Latin America and U.S. tour. In 1996, Azul Violeta built an improvised recording studio inside an abandoned Jalisco theatre to make the next album. The result was Globoscopio, which was presented live all over Mexico. In May 1998, César López decided to leave the band to join Jaguares. The remaining Azul Violeta members released Mini Multi, recorded in New York and produced by the band and by Didi Gutman. After a 2-year struggle against EMI Music México, the band got free of its contract in 2000, joining the Indie scene in Guadalajara. By 2002 Iván González and Yuri González had left the band, but another record, Contacto, was on the way. Hugo Rodríguez and Alex Pèrez recruited old friends and guest musicians from past tours in order to record the album, which was released with limited distribution and promotion through Fugazi records.

As of 2007, Azul Violeta is disbanded. Some efforts have been made to reunite them; a reunion gig was held in March 2006 in a small club in Guadalajara, but it seems hard to get them together for a tour or new record.

Azul Violeta reunited to perform at the International Fireworks Festival in Puerto Vallarta 2014.

== Discography ==
- América
- Globoscopio
- Mini/Multi
- Contacto
- Despedida Fingida
