= Gustavo Rodríguez (writer) =

Peruvian writer (born 1968)

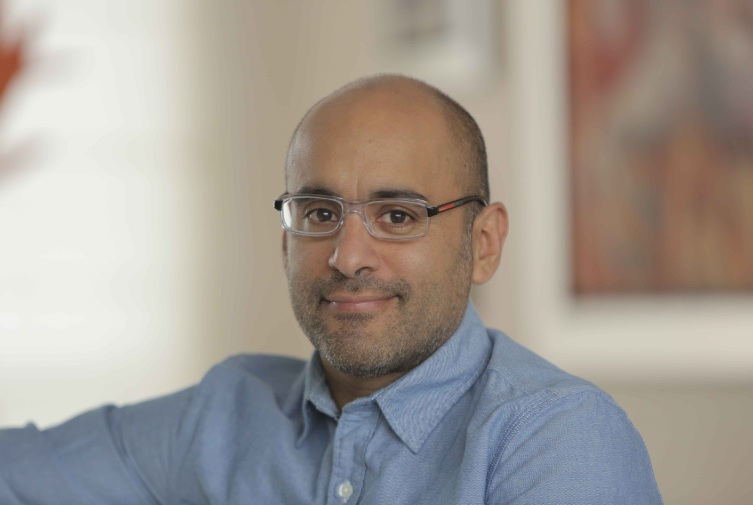
- Born: Peruvian writer Gustavo Rodríguez Vela; 2 May 1968 (age 58); Lima, Peru
- Occupation: Writer
- Children: Alesia; Maira; Malú
- Writing career
- Genres: Fiction and non-fiction
- Notable awards: Finalist Herralde Novel Prize for "The laughter of your mother" (2002); Best Communicator Award for Social Responsibility Law School of Lima (2014); Planet Casamerica Finalist Award for "The week has seven women" (2009); Recognition for their creative contribution to the country by Indecopi (2002); Medal of the city of Trujillo (2015); Alfaguara Prize; 2023
- Website: www.gustavorodriguez.pe

Gustavo Rodríguez Vela (born 2 May 1968) is a Peruvian writer and communication expert, author of several novels and story books.

== Biography ==
Born in Lima, Rodriguez lived in Trujillo on the north coast of Peru from the ages of five to sixteen years old. This time made a definite impression on him and which can be seen in his first novel, The Fury of Achilles (2001) (La furia de Aquiles). It tells the story of four young people traveling from a small town to Lima to study, start a career and live together, and where they experience enmity, jealousy, insecurity and chaos of a big city.

Apropos of this novel, Alberto Fuguet declared, in Chile in 2010: "My editor, Gabriel Sandoval, had told me about a Peruvian novel that I would like, a kind of Vargas Llosa's "The Time of the Hero" ("La ciudad y los perros"), a contemporary and endearing read, referring to "The Fury of Achilles". Since then I have been buying the books of Rodriguez during occasional stops at Lima airport and now I have the great pleasure to present Gustavo here in Chile. Rodriguez is one of those voices that surprise precisely because he does not boast of nourishing from literature. Not reading him is not permitted as an indulgence."

The first book published by Rodriguez was a collection of stories: 'Cuentos de fin de semana' (Weekend Tales) (1998). Three years later came his first quoted novel, followed by other works, both novels and stories, and nonfiction, as with the biography of the acclaimed Peruvian tenor Juan Diego Flórez. He has also co-authored two books with the sociologist Sandro Venturo: 'Ampay Peru!' (Translatable as Gotcha, Peru) and 'Ampay woman' that looks to knock down myths about his country and the Peruvian woman. Its main articles and essays are collected in Peruvian Translations (2008).

"La risa de tu madre" ("The laughter of your mother") (2003) tells of the obsession that invades a filmmaker when he finds a hidden photograph of his recently deceased mother. Here, his mother appears with a resounding laugh, in a gesture of laughter that his son never saw in her when she was alive. To find out what had provoked that laughter in the hidden picture will take him to find a family secret which will cause a complete review of his life. This novel was one of the finalists for the Herralde Award.

"La semana tiene siete mujeres" ("The week has seven women") (2010) tells a story of infidelity and racism in a city like Lima: a white man born to a "good family" and impoverished economically will have to investigate the love of a half-caste who traveled the opposite way to enrichment and celebrity, a half-caste who also took the love of his life. This novel was a finalist for the Planeta-Casamerica award.

“Cocinero en su tinta" ("Chef in his ink") 2012 tells of the crisis of a Peruvian chef "who must face his traumas and decisions while he invents a dish that represents what his country means to the world. This novel involuntarily generated a huge controversy after the writer Iván Thays wrote an article on his blog at El País and received attacks for criticizing Peruvian cuisine.

“República de La Papaya” ("Papaya Republic") (2016) tells the story of Paula Yanez, 'La Papaya', an important political consultant who has just ended an affair with one of her students. Paula takes refuge in work and accepts the advice of the First Lady of the Country who has been launched as a presidential candidate without knowing that her former partner is in love with a rival candidate. In this novel, Mario Bellatin said that "only the words of Gustavo Rodriguez are able to create the nostalgia of a city that appears and disappears simultaneously".

For his part, Alberto Fuguet, commented about it: "Apart from literature, Rodriguez also believes in the street and in his eyes and in himself. Rather than write, sometimes it gives the impression that what he does is to talk. As this novel creates a great dialogue".

"I wrote you tomorrow" (2016) is a novel for all those who are still young at heart and tells the story of a teenager who starts receiving strange letters under his pillow. They seem to be arriving from the future, and they will accompany him throughout an important period of his life: the one when he’ll live his first love, the complexities of his family (as of any other) and the first big wound.

The novel is written in prose. The book is marketed to children and is also read by adults.

Rodriguez has obtained in his role as advertising creative several distinctions in his country as well as internationally. Among his numerous campaigns, a highlight is the one that originated the Pisco Day in 2003 after starting a trade war with Chile.

In 2006, the National Council of Education conferred on him the Journalism Award in the Internet category. He has also been awarded by Indecopi for his creative contribution to the development of his country.

He has been a columnist for the El Comercio of Lima, contributor to the magazine Etiqueta Negra and co-founder, along with the writer Javier Arevalo, of the Recreo Project, which seeks to bring reading awareness benefits to the schools of Peru.

After leaving Toronja, an integrated communications agency of which he was founder, he runs a communications consultancy that bears his name. Now divorced, he has three daughters: Alesia, Maira and Malu.

In July 2018 published "Madrugada" "Madrugada" ("Dawn"), a novel in tragicomedy key about violence and macho culture. Spain's newspaper El País described it as a mix of the best novels from Guillermo Cabrera Infante and Mario Vargas Llosa.

== Awards ==
- Journalism Award 2006, category Internet (National Board of Education of Peru)
- Herralde Finalist Novel Award for "The laughter of your mother" 2002
- Best Communicator in the Social Responsibility Award by the Lima's Law Bar 2014
- Finalist of the Planeta Casamerica Award for "The week has seven women" 2009
- Recognition for his creative contribution to the country by Indecopi 2002
- Medal of the city of Trujillo 2015
- Alfaguara Prize 2023

== Works ==
- Weekend Tales (Cuentos de fin de semana), stories, Lluvia Publishers, Lima, 1998
- The Fury of Achilles (La furia de Aquiles), novel, Algaguara, Lima, 2001
- The laughter of your mother (La risa de tu madre), novel, Alfaguara, Lima, 2003 (one of the finalists of the Herralde novel Award)
- Thirteen short lies (Trece mentiras cortas), stories, Alfaguara, Lima, 2006.
- Ampay Peru, along with the sociologist Sandro Venturo; Aguilar, 2007
- Juan Diego Florez. Notes of a voice, biography, Universidad Peruana de Ciencias Applicadas, Lima, 2007
- Peruvian Translations: our greatness and awkwardness seen by a communicator, an anthology of articles, Norma Group, Lima, 2008
- Ampay woman, along with sociologist Sandro Venturo; Aguilar, 2009
- The week has seven women (La semana tiene siete mujeres), novel, Planeta, 2010 (one of the finalists for the Planeta –Casamerica Award)
- The Chullachaki in the other jungle (El chullachaki en la otra selva ) story; Supernatural Collection Daily Correo; GG Editors -Recreo, Lima, 2011
- Chef in his ink (Cocinero en su tinta), novel, Planet, 2012
- Juan Chichones superhéroe a golpes, Editorial Santillana, 2015
- Papaya Republic (Republica de La Papaya), novel, Editorial Planeta, 2016
- I wrote you tomorrow (Te escribí mañana), Editorial SM, 2016
