= María de los Ángeles Pineda =

María de los Ángeles Pineda Villa is the former first lady of Iguala, a city in the Mexican state of Guerrero. In October 2014, the Attorney General of Mexico, Jesús Murillo Karam, accused her and her husband, José Luis Abarca Velázquez, of being the "probable masterminds" behind the September 2014 Iguala mass kidnapping and disappearance of 43 students from the Ayotzinapa Rural Teachers' College. Pineda Villa and her husband fled hours after the reported abductions and were arrested by federal authorities on November 4, 2014. In November 2014, the prosecution's investigation indicated that Mayor Abarca ordered local police to stop the students from protesting a political event and speech Pineda Villa was scheduled to hold. The police allegedly attacked the students' buses when they entered Iguala and then delivered them to members of the local drug gang, Guerreros Unidos. Along with her family ties to the Sinaloa Cartel and Beltrán-Leyva Cartel, confessions by detained gang members and police officers have revealed Pineda Villa as the "principal operator" of the Guerreros Unidos.

== Early life and education ==
María de los Ángeles Pineda Villa is the daughter of Salomón Pineda Bermúdez and Maria Leticia Villa Ortuño. She has four brothers: Julio Guadalupe, Mario Antonio, Salomón and Alberto.

=== Ties to organized crime ===
Since 2002, Salomón, or "El Malón" and his brothers, Mario "El MP" and Alberto "El Borrado", had been operating as independent drug traffickers in Guerrero and Morelos. In 2002, the brothers formally joined the Sinaloa Cartel. Under the orders of Arturo Beltrán Leyva, they were placed in charge of operations in Zihuatanejo and other areas of Guerrero, as well as the state of Morelos. The Pinedas trafficked primarily cocaine, coming from Colombia and Venezuela to Guerrero. In 2005, under the instruction of the Sinaloa Cartel, the brothers formed a group of 200 hitmen called Los Pelones to control Guerrero and defend against attacks by rival cartels, such as the Los Zetas and La Familia Michoacana. As of 2014, "Los Pelones" were believed to be the predecessor of the Guerreros Unidos.

In 2006, the Mexican drug war began under President Felipe Calderón's administration, which involved a crackdown on drug trafficking organizations by Mexican authorities. In March 2009, the attorney general's office (Procuraduría General de la República, PGR) named Pineda Villa's brothers Alberto and Mario Antonio in their list of the most wanted drug traffickers. In May 2009, the PGR arrested five members of the Pineda Villa family in Morelos: María's three brothers Alberto, Mario, Salomón and her parents. In September 2009, Alberto and Mario were murdered for their betrayal of kingpin Arturo Beltrán Leyva. In December 2009, Arturo Beltrán Leyva was killed during a shootout with Mexican Marines in Cuernavaca, Morelos. which caused the Beltrán-Leyva Cartel to break up into smaller independent organizations, led by former Betrán Leyva operators. This included the Guerreros Unidos, led by Salomón "El Malón" Pineda Villa, in the states of Guerrero and Morelos.

== Career ==
María de los Ángeles Pineda and her husband, José Luis Abarca Velázquez, met in Guerrero and built their wealth selling gold and jewelry. After accumulating a number of local businesses, they came into contact with local political bigwigs in Iguala who then tapped Abarca to enter a mayoral contest. in June 2012, Abarca won the election and became Mayor of Iguala despite having no previous political experience. Abarca and Guerrero's Governor, Ángel Aguirre Rivero, were members of the Party of the Democratic Revolution (PRD) in opposition to President Enrique Peña Nieto's Institutional Revolutionary Party (PRI).

In 2013, Abarca was accused of killing a local community organizer and fellow PRD member, Arturo Hernández Cardona, and two fellow leftist activists the day after an argument at a city council meeting. Hernández's wife, Iguala city councilwoman Sofía Mendoza, gave a statement to state authorities, but they failed to investigate the allegations.

Evidence suggests that state officials, namely Governor Ángel Aguirre of Guerrero, were aware of Pineda Villa's criminal ties. On October 13, 2014, a video was posted online of a blindfolded and tied woman who identified herself as Maria Leonor Villa Ortuña, the mother of María de los Ángeles Pineda and mother-in-law of Mayor Abarca. Along with detailing her family's criminal history and ties to the Beltrán-Leyva cartel, the woman claimed that her sons funded Ángel Aguirre's 2011 campaign for governor on behalf of the Beltrán-Leyva cartel.

Even though her husband held the mayoral position, it has been claimed Pineda Villa's forceful presence at City Council meetings was evidence that she was the one "calling the shots" in terms of political decisions. At the time of the disappearances, she had been tapped by Abarca's PRD party to run as the next mayor of Iguala. While the event scheduled on September 26, 2014, was supposedly to celebrate her role advancing Iguala's welfare program, it was the unofficial start of her mayoral election campaign.

== Iguala disappearances, investigation and arrest ==
On September 26, 2014, around 100 male student teachers from the Ayotzinapa Rural Teachers' College travelled by bus through the town of Iguala on their way to a demonstration in Mexico City. That night, municipal police in Iguala confronted the students and opened fire against them. Three students and three by-standers were killed and 43 students were forcibly disappeared. Pineda Villa and her husband fled hours after the reported abductions.

On September 28, 2014, Guerrero's State Attorney General opened an investigation into the mass kidnapping and killings and Iguala authorities arrested 22 local police officers, naming the Guerreros Unidos responsible for the crimes.

On October 1, 2014, Pineda Villa and her husband went into hiding.

On October 17, 2014, federal Attorney General Murillo announced the arrest of who he deemed the "supreme leader" of the Guerreros Unidos cartel, Sidronio Casarrubias Salgado. In his interrogation, Casarrubias told authorities that Pineda Villa ordered the Guerreros Unidos to "make an example" of the missing students and identified her as the leader of the local police and the gang's highest-ranking member in government. On October 23, 2014, Governor Aguirre resigned.

On November 4, 2014, Pineda Villa and her husband were arrested in Mexico City.

On January 5, 2015, Pineda Villa was transferred from house arrest to the "El Rincón" maximum security prison in Tepic, Nayarit. In January 2015 she was charged with federal crimes of organized crime and conducting operations with illicit funds.
