= Salvador Cienfuegos =

Mexican army officer and politician (born 1948)

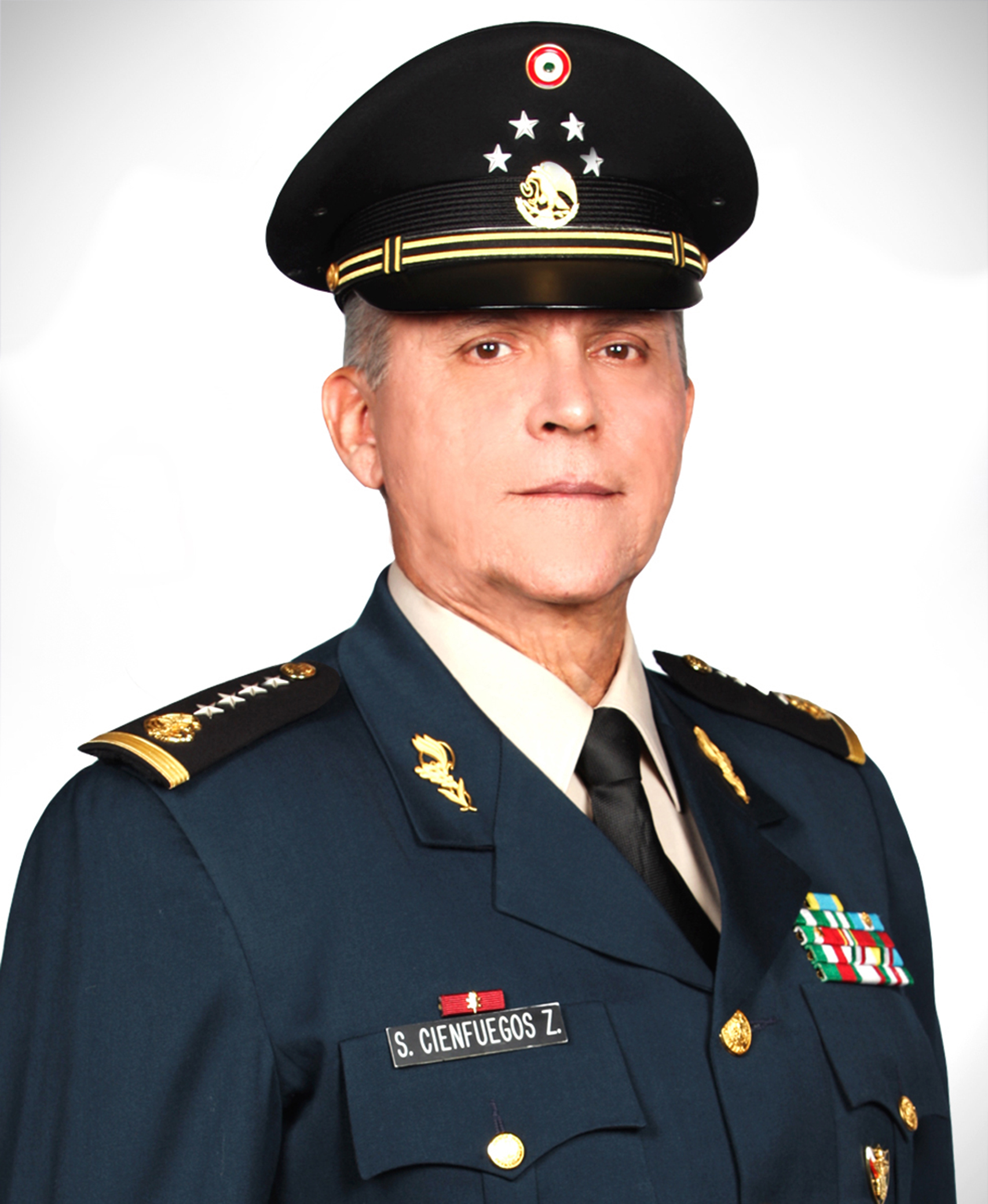

Secretary of National Defense
- In office 1 December 2012 – 30 November 2018
- President: Enrique Peña Nieto
- Preceded by: Guillermo Galván Galván
- Succeeded by: Luis Cresencio Sandoval

Personal details
- Born: 14 June 1948 (age 78) Mexico City, Mexico
- Spouse: Bertha Lucía Gutiérrez
- Children: 4
- Education: Williams College; Heroic Military College; Higher School of War (Bachelor's degree); College of National Defense (Master's degree)
- Nickname: El Padrino (alleged)

Military service
- Allegiance: Mexico
- Branch/service: Mexican Army
- Years of service: 1964–2018
- Rank: Division general
- Battles/wars: Mexican Dirty War; Chiapas conflict Mexican drug war
- Awards: Mexican Legion of Honor; Legion of Merit

Salvador Cienfuegos Zepeda (born 14 June 1948) is a retired Mexican Army officer. He served as the Secretary of National Defense in the government of President Enrique Peña Nieto from 2012 to 2018.

== Early life ==
Cienfuegos was born on 14 June 1948 in Mexico City to a seamstress mother and a father who was a lieutenant colonel in the Mexican Army. His father died of a heart attack when he was two years old. Cienfuegos enrolled at the Williams College in Mixcoac during the second year of his primary schooling. Due to the tuition fees being high, he pursued a federal scholarship which he struggled to maintain due to his average grades.

After finishing schooling, Cienfuegos was admitted into the Heroic Military College on 23 January 1964, at the young age of fifteen, due to a special exemption granted to him by the college authorities. He was also enlisted in the Mexican Army at the same time. He graduated from the college in 1967 and became a second lieutenant-in-arms.

== Military career ==
As a military officer, Cienfuegos experienced the actions of the Mexican Army during the students' movement and the Mexican Dirty War. From 1 November 1967 to 15 December 1967, he served in the 6th Infantry Battalion in the state of Michoacán and was the Section Commander. Later he served in the 3rd Infantry Battalion in Mexico City from 16 December 1967 to 31 August 1975 and was the commander of Company and Section departments.

He was promoted to the rank of lieutenant on 1 November 1969, second captain on 20 November 1973 and first captain on 20 November 1976. He completed his bachelor's degree in military administration from the Higher School of War in 1978 and graduated as an officer of the General Staff of the Mexican Army. From 16 August 1978 to 15 August 1980, he served in the 27th Military Zone in the state of Guerrero and was the head of the First Section of the General Staff.

On 20 November 1979, Cienfuegos was promoted to the rank of major. He was appointed as the head of the Plans Subsection of the 4th Section of the General Staff of National Defense on 16 August 1980, serving in the position till 28 February 1982. He was appointed as an associate professor of the Logistics and Services section at his alma mater of Higher School of War on 16 June 1983, serving in that position till 31 August. From 1 September 1983 to 31 December 1984, he was a professor in the Tactics and Engineering section. He was also promoted to the rank of lieutenant colonel on 20 November 1983.

On 1 January 1984, Cienfuegos was appointed as the professor of the General Staff section at the Higher School of War and stayed there till 31 August. On 1 August, he was made a professor of the subject of Logistics and Services and also the head of the Group of the Pedagogical Area of Logistics and Services, in the Superior Course of Weapons and Services. He remained in those positions till 30 June 1985. He was also the head of the Technical Section of Research and Development from 1 March to 30 June 1985. He was transferred as the head of the Pedagogical Section of the Heroic Military College on 1 July 1985, staying in the position till 15 January 1986.

From 16 January 1986 to 31 October 1988, he was the head of the 3rd Section (Operations) of the General Staff of National Defense. He was appointed as the representative of the Secretariat of National Defense to the Advisory Council of the National Commission of Nuclear Safety and Safeguards and the titular representative to the Planning Committee for the Development of the Federal District. In March 1987, he attended a military conference of various nations at Fort Benning in the United States. Cienfuegos addressed the topic of the role of the Mexican Army and the Air Force against drug trafficking. He was promoted to the rank of colonel on 20 November 1987.

He was deployed as a military and air attaché to the Mexican embassies of Japan and South Korea from 1 November 1988 to 31 October 1990, while being based in Tokyo. Later he served as the commander of the 14th Infantry Battalion, headquartered in the state of Jalisco, from 16 January to 30 September 1991. On 1 October 1991, Cienfuegos became the commander of the Cadet Corps of the Heroic Military College, retaining that position till 15 July 1994. On 20 November 1993, he achieved the rank of general brigadier.

A cadet enrolled at Heroic Military College during Cienfuegos' tenure as commander of the Cadet Corps, told Reporte Indigo that he had defended seniors who murdered a younger cadet in September 1993. Although he regretted the killing, he stated that the behavior of the parents of the victim in initiating legal proceedings over it was not manly, but that of snitches, and asked other cadets to not talk about it to anyone. The former cadet also told the outlet that Cienfuegos participated in drug-fueled parties on the campus, despite exhorting others about discipline.

Cienfuegos earned a master's degree in Military Administration for Homeland Security and Defense from the College of National Defense in 1995. From 1 August 1995 to 30 August 1996, he was the Deputy Director General of the Federal Register of Firearms and Explosives Control, and later the director of the Center for Mexican Army and Air Force Studies from 1 September 1996 to 15 November 1997. He was promoted to the rank of brigade general in 1997, and upon receiving it was also appointed as the director of his alma mater Heroic Military College, remaining in the position till the year 2000. Cienfuegos was also the Deputy Chief of the Military Doctrine of the General Staff of National Defense from 1 December 2000 to 15 January 2004. From 19 September to 9 November 2001, he was the commander of the Fourth Training Group "2001" at the National Training Center in the state of Chihuahua.

Cienfuegos was made the commander of the 15th Military Zone, headquartered in the state of Jalisco, in March 2004. He retained the position till 2005 and was promoted to the rank of division general on 20 November 2004 by President Vicente Fox.

In February 2005, Cienfuegos was appointed as the commander of the Vth Military Region, also headquartered in Jalisco. Anabel Hernández alleges in her book México en Llamas that Sergio Villarreal Barragán, lieutenant of the Beltrán-Leyva Cartel, appointed him to protect the organization in 2005. Cienfuegos commanded the IXth Military Military Region, headquartered in Acapulco, Guerrero, from June 2005 to January 2007. During this period according to Hernández, he and the Federal Investigative Agency protected the Sinaloa Cartel and Beltrán-Leyva Cartel, which controlled the Guerrero region. She also accuses the Army of inaction against the Beltrán-Leyva. Both the Sinaloa and Beltrán-Leyva cartels became stronger while he was serving as the head of the military region.

Cienfuegos later served as the head of the Ist Military Region, headquartered in Mexico City, from January 2007 to December 2009. Hernández states that the activities of the Sinaloa and Beltrán-Leyva cartels intensified in the city during this period. During this time period, he also developed a friendship with Enrique Peña Nieto, who was serving as the Governor of the State of Mexico. He coordinated with the Secretary of Public Security Genaro García Luna in the war on drugs, though the journalist J. Jesús Lemus alleges that this was just a show. Although he did not participate in Operation Chihuahua, some of the soldiers taking part in it were under his command and were implicated in human right abuses by the Mexican Commission for the Defense and Promotion of Human Rights.

Cienfuegos was transferred to the VIIth Military Region by President Felipe Calderón in January 2010, serving in that position till May 2011. Lemus alleges that this allowed the H-2 Cartel led by Juan Francisco Patrón Sánchez or "El H2", to expand its activities into the states of Chiapas and Tabasco. Cienfuegos stated in April 2011 that the Mexican Army faced a bigger problem from the organized crime in Chiapas, rather than the EZLN. During his tenure, the army was accused of perpetrating four incidents of tortures and executions in the region by the National Human Rights Commission.

Cienfuegos was appointed as the Inspector and Comptroller General of the Army and Air Force on 1 May 2011 after General Roberto Miranda Sánchez was appointed to replace the recently deceased General Jorge Juárez Loera. Cienfuegos relinquished the charge after being appointed as the senior officer for the Secretariat of National Defense on 17 January 2012 in place of General Miranda, who had announced his retirement. General Mario Marco Antonio González Barreda was appointed as the Inspector and Comptroller General in his place.

Cienfuegos also participated in diplomatic visits to the United States, Chile, the People's Republic of China, and Cuba. In addition, he accompanied the military to Nicaragua, Cuba, Brazil and Costa Rica in 1980. Among the military decorations in the Long Service field he has received are 5th Class, 4th Class, 3rd Class, 2nd Class, 1st Class, Special, Extraordinary, Institutional and Service for the Fatherland. In addition, he has received the 1st and 2nd class optional merits and the Legion of Honor.

== Secretary of National Defense ==
Cienfuegos was appointed as the Secretary of National Defense on 1 December 2012 under President Enrique Peña Nieto. His tenure saw the Secretariat of National Defense become involved in corruption scandals. The Mexican Army also received new facilities under his tenure in states affected by organized crime. In 2013, he oversaw the operations of self-defense groups against the Knights Templar Cartel in Michoacán. He opposed private persons arming themselves, threatening to arrest them, though he added that he understood that they wanted to protect their communities. The armed forces and the federal police were deployed to the state, with the military operations being overseen by him.

He gained notoriety for preventing police investigators from interviewing Mexican soldiers over the kidnapping of 43 students in Iguala and defending the soldiers accused of massacring 22 suspects in Tlatlaya in 2014. In an interview with El Universal in June 2015, he criticized the 2014 reform by the Congress of the Union, subjecting the army to prosecution by civilian courts for crimes and stated that it made the force vulnerable. After the publication of a video showing soldiers torturing a young woman in Ajuchitlán del Progreso in 2015 however, Cienfuegos apologized for the incident on 16 April 2016 unlike past instances, while urging people to report about any abuses they were aware of. He also stated that those committing such acts had no place in the armed forces.

Cienfuegos was made a distinguished university teacher by the University of Colima on 7 December 2016. He talked about the conflict against drug cartels on the following day, saying that "violence cannot be solved with bullets", while also expressing that he wanted the Army off the streets. At the same time, he called for a legal framework to support the armed forces and to not persecute them for specific acts. He also called for a debate on the Internal Security Law, which allowed the armed forces to take over the responsibility of police organizations failing to control crime, something he opposed. On 20 November 2017 however he called on President Nieto to have the Internal Security Law passed by the Congress, stating that the army required a legal framework to define its role.

Cienfuegos stringently opposed presidential candidate Andrés Manuel López Obrador's statement about pardoning cartel bosses in December 2017, while terming it electoral propaganda. Even if Obrador proceeded with such a move, Cienfuegos stated that the civil society, especially the victims, must be consulted first. Obrador in response accused the military members of being ordered to speak out against him and reasoned that violence could not solve violence.

The University of Sciences and Arts of Chiapas intended to give an honorary doctorate to Cienfuegos, but suspended its decision in February 2018 after outcry from the staff and students who pointed at the controversies the military had been involved in. He was awarded the William J. Perry Award by the William J. Perry Center for Hemispheric Defense Studies in September 2018, in recognition for promoting education, research and exchange of security and defense knowledge in the Western Hemisphere. In October 2018, he voiced support for legalizing opium for medicinal purposes in order to reduce crime, especially in Guerrero.

After Obrador's victory in the 2018 Mexican general election, he held discussions with Cienfuegos to choose his successor, something he had not decided upon quickly unlike other positions. Cienfuegos was awarded the Legion of Merit, authorized by the United States Department of Defense and the President of the United States Donald Trump on 16 November 2018 for his work in leading the enhancement of cooperation between the militaries of Mexico and the United States. He stepped down on 30 November 2018 before Obrador's swearing-in, and also retired from the army, which he announced a day earlier.

General Luis Cresencio Sandoval replaced Cienfuegos as the Secretary of National Defense under Obrador, but he automatically continues to remain employed by the federal government as laid down by the Constitution of Mexico, becoming an advisor to Sandoval, a position he has retained even after his arrest by the United States. Obrador on 10 October 2023 presented the "Bicentenary of the Heroic Military College" award to Cienfuegos.

== Arrest and diplomatic controversy ==
The Drug Enforcement Administration began investigating Cienfuegos in December 2015 and indicted him at the United States District Court for the Eastern District of New York on 14 August 2019. He was arrested by U.S. officials on 15 October 2020 at the Los Angeles International Airport on drug and "money-laundering" charges. The United States alleged that he used the alias "El Padrino" ("The Godfather") while working with the H-2 Cartel. His arrest reportedly infuriated President Obrador, who appeared particularly riled that Mexican officials had not been informed about the investigation into the general. The Mexican government warned the U.S. that it would review security agreements because it was not given advance notice of the arrest.

On 18 November 2020, American authorities dropped charges against Cienfuegos, who had already been imprisoned in the U.S. for over a month, and agreed to send him back to Mexico. Media outlets reported that the charges had been dropped under pressure from the Mexican federal government, which had threatened to expel DEA agents from the country. However, it was acknowledged that, in exchange for the U.S. government's agreement to drop the charges, Mexican prosecutors would open their own investigation into him.

On 16 December 2020, Mexico's Chamber of Deputies passed changes to a security law that tightened the rules governing foreign law enforcement agents. Under the new regulations backed by Obrador, foreign agents must share the information they gather with Mexican officials and no longer have immunity. United States Attorney General William Barr warned Mexico that by passing this law, it would make it hard for the U.S. to cooperate with Mexico. Secretary of Foreign Affairs Marcelo Ebrard said that the changes were all about reciprocity and stated that they were "not asking for anything which isn't expected of a Mexican diplomatic agent abroad."

Cienfuegos was cleared of all charges on 14 January 2021, and Obrador said that the accusations against him were politically motivated. The United States Department of Justice threatened to restart its prosecution if Mexico did not prosecute him. After the publishing of the evidence against Cienfuegos by the Mexican government, the Department of Justice expressed disappointment at his being cleared and stated that the release of evidence violated the Treaty on Mutual Legal Assistance between the countries, questioning whether the United States could still share "secret information" with Mexico.

== Personal life ==
Cienfuegos met and married Bertha Lucía Gutiérrez, who is from Cuautla, at a young age. The couple are parents to four daughters and have six grandchildren. He is the only child of his parents. He was arrested for running over an agent at the intersection of Calle Maestro Antonio Caso and Manuel María Contreras streets in Mexico City in May 1980. He was arrested again in 1999 due to indiscipline in the Cadet Corps under him and injury caused to a cadet because of discharge of a weapon by another. His mother died in January 2020.
