= List of municipal presidents of Iguala =

Following is a list of municipal presidents of Iguala, in the Mexican state of Guerrero:

| Municipal president | Term | Political party | Notes |
| Gilberto T. Mota Lazos | 1951–1952 | | |
| Rafael Urióstegui Baena | 1953–1954 | PRI | |
| Agustín Batalla Zepeda | 1954 | PRI | Acting municipal president |
| Ignacio Gama Arredondo | 1955–1956 | | |
| Marcial Soto Noriega | 1957–1959 | | |
| Darío Arrieta Leyva | 1960–1961 | | |
| Israel H. Salmerón | 1961–1962 | | |
| Gilberto T. Mota Lazos | 1963–1965 | | |
| Librado S. García Vélez | 1966–1968 | | |
| Francisco Román Román | 1969–1971 | | |
| Samuel Pérez Alarcón | 1971 | | Acting municipal president |
| Antonio Jaimes Antúnez | 1972–1974 | PRI | |
| Isaías Duarte Martínez | 1975 | PRI | Acting municipal president |
| Saturnino Martínez Lugo | 1975–1977 | | |
| Juan Muñoz Garduño | 1978–1980 | | |
| Raymundo Román Noverón | 1981–1983 | | |
| Julio César Catalán Flores | 1984–1986 | | |
| Emilio Alonso Avilés | 1987–1989 | | |
| Felipe Cardona Marino | 1990–1993 | | |
| Juan Muñoz Caballero | 06-1993–31-12-1993 | | Acting municipal president |
| Nacim Kuri Cristino | 01-01-1994–04-1994 | | Applied for a leave due to ill health |
| José Luis Román Román | 1994–1996 | | Acting municipal president |
| Lázaro Mazón Alonso | 1996–1999 | PRD | |
| Juan Muñoz Caballero | 1999–2002 | PRI | |
| Lázaro Mazón Alonso | 2002–2005 | PRD | |
| Antonio Salvador Jaimes Herrera | 2005–2008 | PRD | |
| Raúl Tovar Tavera | 01-01-2009–2012 | PRI | Applied for a temporary leave |
| Julio Escalera Urióstegui | 2012 | PRI | Acting municipal president |
| Raúl Tovar Tavera | 2012–30-09-2012 | PRI | Resumed, in order to end his quadrennium (this term was, exceptionally, a four-year one) |
| José Luis Abarca Velázquez | 01-10-2012–30-09-2014 | PRD | Applied for a leave due to the Iguala mass kidnapping, and then, on 17 October 2014, the Congress of the State of Guerrero approved the trial to revoke the mandate of Abarca Velázquez |
| Óscar Antonio Chávez Pineda | 30-09-2014–29-10-2014 | PRD | Substitute |
| Luis Mazón Alonso | 29-10-2014–29-10-2014 | PRD | Acting municipal president. Applied for a leave, was in office during a few hours |
| Silviano Mendiola Pérez | 11-11-2014–30/09/2015 | PRD | Acting municipal president |
| Esteban Albarrán Mendoza | 01-10-2015–11-10-2016 | PRI; PVEM | Coalition PRI-PVEM. Applied for a leave |
| Herón Delgado Castañeda | 11-10-2016–30-09-2018 | PRI; PVEM | Coalition PRI-PVEM. Acting municipal president |
| Antonio Salvador Jaimes Herrera | 01-10-2018–30-09-2021 | Morena; PES | Coalition Morena-PES |
| David Gama Pérez | 01-10-2021–30-09-2024 | PRI; PRD | Coalition PRI-PRD |
| Erik Catalán Rendón | 01-10-2024– | PVEM; PT; Morena | Coalition "Sigamos Haciendo Historia" (Let's Keep Making History) |
