= Somos Los Otros NY =

Mexican activist collective in the United States

Somos Los Otros
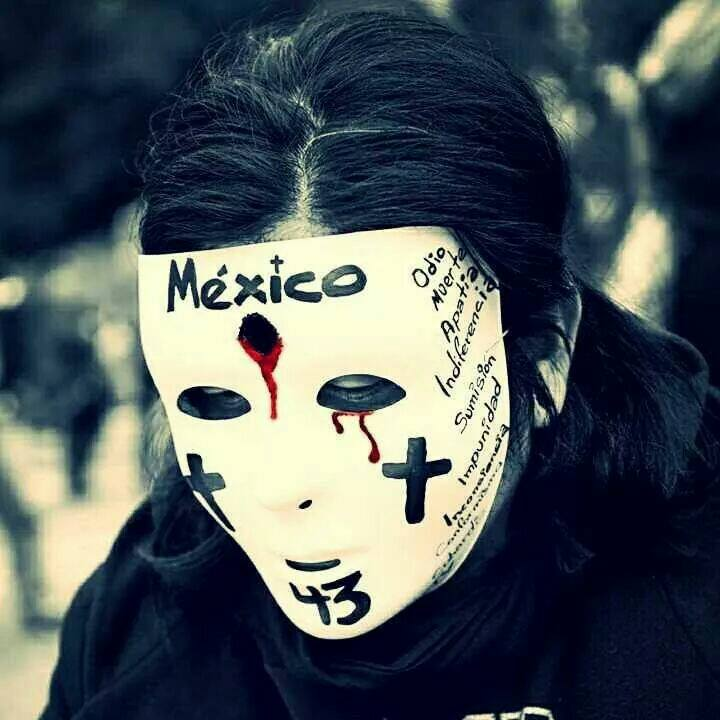
- Formation: c. 2014
- Type: Political Activism; Mexican community; Voluntary association
- Purpose: anti-Mérida Initiative; anti-fascism; Mexican activism; Internet activism
- Region served: Mexico, United States

Somos Los Otros NY is a Mexican activist collective that operates primarily in New York City and Washington DC in political and cultural events that raise awareness for Mexico's current human rights crisis. The group counts with social media presence and has appeared on the internet with protest action videos that counter the Mexican government's political narrative.

== Introduction ==
Due to deteriorating human rights situation in Mexico and declining popular opinion abroad, Mexicans residing in the United States began to organize collectives to denounce the government of Mexico's human rights violations, and, in particular, the disappearance of the 43 students of Ayotzinapa. One such group was Somos Los Otros NY, a collective known for their online distribution of political content. Mexican activists began the collective "Somos Los Otros NY" in New York, New York during the fall of 2014 for the explicit purpose of developing a political message for the immigrant Mexican community.

== Activism ==
Somos Los Otros NY is a New York-based Mexican activists collective that has maintained pressure on the Mexican government over their human rights record and derailed the public relations efforts of the Mexican government in Washington D.C. The group has maintained protests visibly active since the disappearance of the 43 Ayotzinapa students. In the fall of 2014, the group established activities in the New York area, but also made its presence felt in Washington D.C. during Enrique Peña Nieto's meeting with President Obama.

In parallel with their advocacy for the Ayotzinapa cause, they have begun spearheading a campaign against Plan Merida too in order to call attention to the client state status the Mexican government currently enjoys from the US government. Under Plan Merida (or Merida Initiative), hundreds of millions of dollars' worth of military equipment, training and diplomatic support have been provided to the Mexican government since the end of 2007.

== Online presence ==
Using different forms of traditional and internet based media, the group has created several viral videos showing their disdain for President Enrique Peña Nieto. Their most popular video showed the current president of Mexico exiting a luxurious hotel as the activist group yelled Asesino ('murderer' in Spanish). Their videos and photographs have grown in popularity since the inception of the group, having been cited by multiple news outlets in both the US and Mexico.

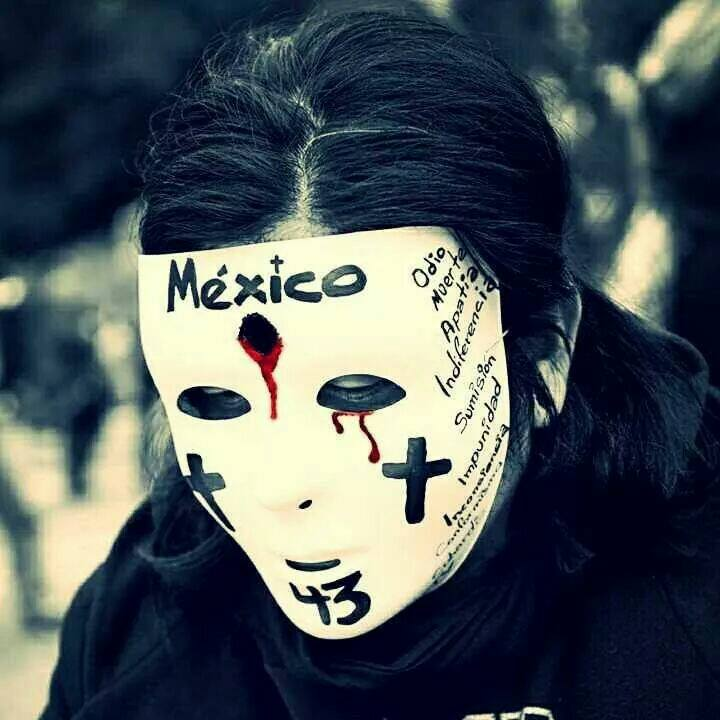
Mexicans repudiate mestizo genocide of indigenous Mexicans through protest.
