= Rogelio Ortega Martínez =

Mexican politician (born 1955)

Rogelio Ortega Martinez
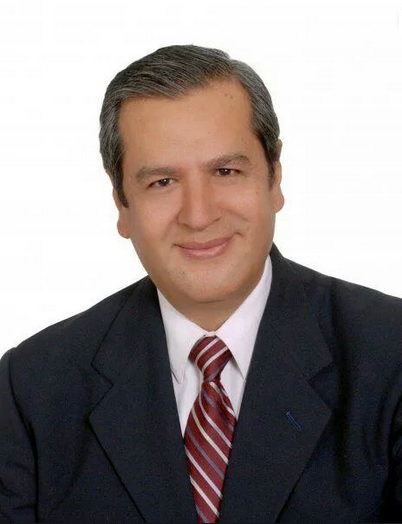

Governor of Guerrero
- In office 27 October 2014 – 26 October 2015
- Preceded by: Ángel Aguirre Rivero
- Succeeded by: Héctor Astudillo Flores

Personal details
- Born: 26 July 1955 (age 70) Taxco de Alarcón, Guerrero, Mexico
- Profession: Academic administrator

Salvador Rogelio Ortega Martínez (born 26 July 1955) is a Mexican educator who was appointed interim Governor of Guerrero on 27 October 2014 following the resignation of Ángel Aguirre Rivero after the political scandal of the 43 missing students in Iguala. He served in office until 27 October 2015. Ortega Martinez was previously director of the Autonomous University of Guerrero.

Preceded by Ángel Aguirre Rivero	Governor of Guerrero; 2014 – 2015	Succeeded by Héctor Astudillo Flores
