= Semillas collective =

Semillas
- Formation: c. 2014
- Type: Political Activism; Mexican community; Voluntary association
- Purpose: anti-Mérida Initiative; anti-fascism; Mexican activism; Internet activism
- Region served: Mexico, United States

Semillas is an all women Mexican art, justice, and healing collective based in New York City. Surging in 2014 in response to the forced disappearance of 43 Ayotzinapa students, the group raises awareness about Mexico's turmoil through media kits, documentary showings and cultural events. Semillas often holds political and cultural events that raise awareness for Mexico's current human rights crisis throughout Manhattan, Queens and Brooklyn, with links to social movements and supporting indigenous resistance. The collective is known for developing narrative based documentaries, infographics, and dance films that often serve as protests against the Mexican government's gross violation of human rights. The collective also is committed to proving trauma healing for communities marked by conflict linked trauma.

== Introduction ==
On September 26, 2014, 43 students from the Ayotzinapa Teachers college were forcibly disappeared by Mexican security forces. The forced disappearance of the 43 students of Ayotzinapa inspired collective members to create videos with explicit messaging on the topic. Their first film received favorable reviews from NBC, while receiving the blessing of the Ayotzinapa parents, but suffered initially due to Mexican consulate interference. In New York City, the Mexican consulate attempts to maintain influence on art spaces for the purpose of depoliticizing the content that may traverse through such spaces.

== They Didn't Know We Were Seeds (2014) A protest dance-film about Ayotzinapa & Against Plan Mérida ==
In the summer of 2015, Brooklyn based artists launched an effort to create a multi-genre dance film that incorporated indigenous traditional Mexica motifs and other dance forms. The duo enlisted classical ballet dancers, hip-hop flex artist JayDon and Brooklyn & Queens based Mexica danza collectives. This led to a storyline interweaving both the forced disappearance of the 43 students and the Black Lives Matter movement. Eric Garner's family also blessed the inclusion of his voice (his last words 'I can't breathe') in the film.

== "Mexico's Impunity Video" (2015) with Ayotzinapa Parent, in Protest of Mexican Censorship ==
The documentary style short film, sets forth to provide an honest message about the impunity in Mexico from NYC to the world, "Un mensaje honesto acerca de la impunidad en México desde Nueva York al mundo." It was featured on an article on NBC.

== Oaxaca VIVE (2016) #Nochixtlán #CNTE #StopPlanMerida ==
Semillas published this mini-protest dance film, it was published/featured on Mexican news outlet: DESINFORMEMONOS in protest of the killing of teachers protesting in Oaxaca. Claiming that in Mexico, there is no "Drug War" there is a Genocide. Through state terrorism, The federal police and military continue to disappear, kill and commit countless crimes against humanity. Semillas asked viewers to help end the supply of weapons and military support from the United States to Mexico. By signing their petition against Plan Mérida.

== "DÉJAME ABRAZARTE MÉXICO" (2017) ==
In September 2017, two high intensity earthquakes struck Mexico devastating its capital alongside the states of Oaxaca, Chiapas, Morelos, and Puebla. This dance film was created by a group of Mexican movers living abroad, in collaboration with the Semillas Collective, in order to express solidarity with our resilient Mexican community and to maintain relief efforts afloat.

This piece is a tribute to the Mexican civil society and a call to action. Semillas Collective focused on allocating funds to provide long-term relief for the affected indigenous communities by working directly with the CNI (Indigenous People's Congress) and Semillas Collective, which will use the funds in order to help their communities get access to a variety of resources from medical attention to reconstruction materials. Otherwise, please consider other non-governmental sources such as the Omaze platform, which will responsibly deliver the resources into the hands of the people who need it.

== Solidarity Video For Cuba (2017) ==
Online chatter regarding the death of Fidel Castro was deeply polarized. Many reactive elements in the US political system cheered the death of Fidel Castro. Most throughout the world, however, viewed the life of the Cuban leader quite favorably. Havana and Cuba as a whole held a long period of mourning. The Semillas collective filmed a video in Cuba to contextualize the life and message of socialism that prevails in Cuba decades after the Bautista overthrow.
