= Iguala mass kidnapping =

2014 abduction of rural Mexican college students

- Part of the Mexican drug war
- Poster issued by the government of Guerrero
- Location: 17°33′13″N 99°24′37″W; Iguala, Guerrero, Mexico
- Date: September 26, 2014; 12 years ago 21:30 – 00:00 (Central Standard Time)
- Attack type: Police shooting; Mass kidnapping
- Deaths: 6 (shootout); 3 (human remains identified)
- Injuries: 25
- Victims: 40 (disappeared)
- Perpetrators: Guerreros Unidos, Iguala and Cocula policemen, Mexican Federal Police (alleged), Mexican Army (alleged)
- Motive: Unknown, possibly retaliation against a rival drug cartel

On September 26, 2014, forty-three male students from the Ayotzinapa Rural Teachers' College disappeared after being forcibly abducted in Iguala, Guerrero, Mexico, in what has been called one of Mexico's most infamous human rights cases. They were allegedly taken into custody by local policemen from Iguala and Cocula in collusion with organized crime, with later evidence implicating the Mexican Army. Officials have concluded there is no indication the students are alive, but as of 2025, only three students' remains have been identified and their deaths confirmed.

While tens of thousands have gone missing during the Mexican drug war, the 43 missing have become a cause célèbre due to the persistent activism and demands for an explanation by their parents and relatives. Official obstacles put in the way of independent investigations of the case have also provoked social unrest and international protests including protests leading to the resignation of the governor of Guerrero. (Note: Ángel Aguirre Rivero on October 23, 2014.)

The students were preparing to commemorate the anniversary of the 1968 Tlatelolco massacre, following a tradition where they commandeered several buses to travel to Mexico City. The police set up roadblocks and fired weapons to intercept the students, but what happened during and after the stopping of their buses remains unclear. Among the many explanations for the students' disappearance include that the buses hijacked by the students contained drug cartel products or that a rival cartel had infiltrated the student group.

An early investigation—dubbed "the historic truth"—under Mexican Attorney General Jesús Murillo Karam of the government of President Enrique Peña Nieto, concluded corrupt municipal police from Iguala and neighboring towns, following orders from the local mayor, had turned 43 of the students over to the local drug cartel, Guerreros Unidos ("United Warriors"), who killed the students and destroyed their remains, and that Federal police and military played no part in the killings. This was disputed by some experts, such as the Inter-American Commission on Human Rights (IACHR), who found the findings "scientifically impossible". Another investigation (by journalist Anabel Hernández) alleged that the commandeered buses were transporting heroin, without the students' knowledge, and the Mexican Army intercepted the drugs on behalf of the traffickers—the students being killed to eliminate witnesses. There are also reports of military personnel monitoring the students' situation but refraining from helping them.

After President Andrés Manuel López Obrador came to office in 2018, he announced that a "truth commission" would lead a new investigation regardless of where the investigation led. The investigation led to the arrest of a dozen soldiers and a former attorney general, but the army and navy continued to hide information, and on 21 February 2024 parents of missing students announced they would cease dialogue with the commission.

Among those incarcerated in connection for the crime as of early 2024 are the leader of the United Warriors cartel José Ángel Casarrubias Salgado, known as "El Mochomo" (sentenced to life in prison in the U.S.), and former federal attorney general Jesús Murillo Karam (under house arrest in Mexico City as of early 2024).

== Background ==
The Ayotzinapa Rural Teachers' College in Tixtla, Guerrero, Mexico, founded in 1926, is an all-male school that has historically been associated with student activism. Guerrero teachers, including the students from Ayotzinapa, are known for their "militant and radical protests that often involve hijacking buses and delivery trucks." The appropriation of vehicles was, according to the students, routine and temporary, and according to other sources, such as The New York Times, "largely tolerated" by bus companies of the vicinity. Most of the buses are usually returned after the protests conclude. However, it was not always popular with the public as it would leave passengers of the commandeered buses stranded. Law enforcement generally tolerated this tactic despite frequent complaints from owners and transport users. Although federal agents have tended not to actively confront students for the appropriation of buses, the practice puts students and teachers at odds with local officials. Other protest tactics used by the students include throwing rocks at police officers, property theft, road blockings, and taking over toll booths to demand payment.

Local authorities in Guerrero tend to be wary of student protests because of historic and suspected ties with leftist guerrillas or rival political groups (see Mexican Dirty War). In 1995, the Guerrero state police killed seventeen farmers and injured twenty-one others during a protest in an event known as the Aguas Blancas massacre. The massacre led to the creation of the Popular Revolutionary Army (Spanish: Ejército Popular Revolucionario), which is believed by some state officials to retain some political influence in Guerrero. Students claim to have no ties with such groups, and that the only thing they have in common with them is socialist ideology. In addition, in Guerrero, where the bus companies are assumed to pay protection money, student campaigns are seen as threatening to organized crime.

In December 2011, two students from the Raúl Isidro Burgos Rural Teachers College of Ayotzinapa were gunned down and killed by the Guerrero state police during a rally on the Cuernavaca to Acapulco federal highway.

=== Large numbers of missing and presumed dead ===
According to Alma Guillermoprieto of The New Yorker magazine, Stefanie Eschenbacher of Reuters news service, and a number of other sources, tens of thousands of people in Mexico have gone missing since 2006, a problem that started with a wave of violence unleashed by the "War on Drugs" declared by President Felipe Calderón and his mobilising of the Mexican armed forces to fight organized drug traffickers. While this led to the arrest of high-level cartel leaders, rather than decapitating the drug networks, it led to a surge in violence as lower-level chiefs competed to replace former bosses. Rather than introducing an incorruptible security force to replace corrupt local police, it led to the corruption of the military.

Eschenbacher states that the interior ministry's official database registered 111,896 people as missing as of October 2023, while Guillermoprieto gave a "low-range official estimate" of 80,000 disappeared from 2006 to early 2024. The U.N. Committee on Enforced Disappearances called the large number of disappeared and very small number of investigations of the disappearances "alarming", and expressed disapproval of the "almost absolute impunity" of kidnappers and killers of the disappeared.

=== Protests over education reform proposals ===
In February 2013, President Enrique Peña Nieto published an education bill in the Official Journal of the Federation in agreement with the pact signed by the three main political parties, Institutional Revolutionary Party (PRI), National Action Party (PAN) and Party of the Democratic Revolution (PRD), named Pact for Mexico. The bill aimed to reform Mexican public education, introducing a competitive process for the hiring, promotion, recognition, and tenure of teachers, principals, and administrators and declared that all previous appointments that did not conform to the procedures were null. Some teachers opposed the bill, claiming standardized tests that do not take in account the socio-economic differences between urban and under-equipped rural schools would affect students and teachers from economically depressed regions such as Guerrero.

In May 2013, teachers belonging to the Coordinadora Nacional de Trabajadores de la Educación (CNTE) union began rallies and strikes across Mexico, protesting in the Zócalo of Mexico City in a sit-in against the Reform and the bill of secondary laws. Students of the Rural Teachers College of Ayotzinapa joined the protest against the reform. In September 2013, the police retook the Zócalo square using water cannons and tear gas.

Business organizations of Baja California, Estado de Mexico, and Chiapas demanded decisive action against teachers on strike, as well as politicians from the PRD and PAN, and academics. In October 2013, three teachers protesting against the Education Reform suffered head injuries and a broken arm after being pelted with stones. The attack was blamed on the inhabitants of the Tepito neighborhood of Mexico City, although teachers blamed the Federal Government.

In January 2014, the governor of the State of Mexico, Eruviel Ávila Villegas, sent a bill to the local Congress proposing to sanction those teachers who were actively protesting and not attending their jobs with fines and jail time. In August 2014, journalist Carlos Loret de Mola claimed to have heard a person in a meeting with President Peña Nieto saying "we're going to beat the hell out of the CNTE guys" ("Les vamos a partir la madre a los de la CNTE").

== Attacks ==
=== Clash with authorities ===
On September 26, 2014, at approximately 6:00 p.m. (CST), more than 100 students from the Ayotzinapa Rural Teachers' College in Tixtla, Guerrero, traveled to Iguala, Guerrero, to interrupt a DIF conference presented by María de los Ángeles Pineda Villa, then-first lady of Iguala, and following that to hijack buses for an upcoming march in Mexico City,

The students had previously attempted to make their way to the state capital Chilpancingo, but state and federal authorities blocked the routes there. In Iguala, the students had plans to solicit transportation costs to Mexico City, approximately 295 km away, for the anniversary march of the 1968 student massacre in Tlatelolco. However, on their way there, the students were intercepted by the Iguala municipal police force at around 9:30 pm, reportedly on orders of the mayor.

The details of what followed during the students' clash with the police vary. According to police reports, the police chased the students because they had hijacked three buses and attempted to drive them off to carry out the protests and then return to their college. Members of the student union, however, stated that they had been protesting and were hitchhiking when they clashed with the police. As the buses sped away and the chase ensued, the police opened fire on the vehicles. Two students were killed in one of the buses, while some fled into the surrounding hills. Roughly three hours later, escaped students returned to the scene to speak with reporters. In a related incident, unidentified gunmen fired at a bus carrying players from a local soccer team, which they may have mistaken for one of the buses that picked up the student protestors. Bullets struck the bus and hit two taxis. The bus driver, a football player, and a woman inside one of the taxis were killed. The next morning, the authorities discovered the corpse of a student, Julio César Mondragón, who had attempted to run away during gunfire. He was tortured before dying of brain injuries. In total, 6 people were killed and 25 wounded.

=== Kidnapping and killings ===
Iguala, Guerrero, is shown within Mexico relative to the capital Mexico City.

After the shootings, eyewitnesses said that students were rounded up and forced into police vehicles. Once in custody, the students were taken to the police station in Iguala and then handed over to the police in Cocula. Cocula deputy police chief César Nava González then ordered his subordinates to transport the students to a rural community known as Pueblo Viejo. At some point, while still alive, the students were handed over by the police to members of the Guerreros Unidos, a criminal organization in Guerrero which splintered from the Beltrán Leyva cartel. One of the trucks used to transport the students was owned by Gildardo "El Cabo Gil" López Astudillo, a high-ranking leader of the gang. "El Cabo Gil" then called Sidronio Casarrubias Salgado, the top leader of Guerreros Unidos, and told him that the people he had in custody posed a threat to the gang's control of the area. Guerreros Unidos likely believed that some of the students were members of a rival gang known as Los Rojos. With that information, Casarrubias ordered his subordinates to kill the students. Investigators believe that a gang member known by his alias "El Chucky" or "El Choky" took part in the killings. He was suspected of collaborating with Francisco Salgado Valladares, one of Iguala's security chiefs, in kidnapping the students.

According to investigators, the students were taken to a dumpster in the outskirts of Cocula. After reaching the site it is likely that 15 students had died of suffocation and the other students were then killed by Patricio Reyes Landa, Jonathan Osorio Gómez and Agustín García Reyes. These three suspects then dumped the bodies in a pit, and some other suspects known only by their aliases burned the corpses with diesel, gasoline, tires, wood and plastic. They also destroyed the students' clothing in order to erase evidence. The fire most likely lasted from midnight until 2:00 or 3:00 pm. The gang assigned guards throughout the day to make sure that the fire was kept alive. When the fire had gone down, the suspects threw dirt in to cool the pit. They then placed the remains in eight plastic bags and dumped them in the San Juan river in Cocula, reportedly on orders from a man known only as "El Terco". "El Gil" then sent a text message to Casarrubias Salgado confirming the completion of the task. "We turned them into dust and threw their remains in the water. They [authorities] will never find them", the text read. Initially, 57 students were reported missing; fourteen of them, however, were located after it was found that they had returned to their families or had made it back safely to their college. The remaining 43 were still unaccounted for. Student activists accused authorities of illegally holding the missing students, but Guerrero authorities said that none of the students were in custody. Believing that the missing students had fled through the hills during the shootings, authorities deployed a helicopter to search for them. The 43 students, however, were never found.

=== Explanations for the disappearance ===
A number of theories have been proposed to explain the disappearance (and what was by 2023-4 assumed to be the killing) by a drug cartel of such a large number of unarmed civilians who were training to be teachers and had "nothing to do" with organized crime.

The history of left-wing activism and radicalism at the local teacher training college students attended aroused suspicion, but it is not clear that the students were targeted for their political beliefs. Some think that they angered Guerreros Unidos by refusing to pay extortion money. Another theory is that the buses hijacked by the students contained drug cartel products or that a rival cartel had infiltrated the student group. Others believe that there was a link between the students' disappearance and the influential wife of Iguala's mayor. On the day of the clashes, she was to give a speech to local dignitaries and some believe the students were targeted because it was feared they could disrupt the event.

The 23,000 text messages between the cartel, police, and government officials obtained by investigators in 2022 also suggest an explanation for their killing, according to prosecutors, according to journalists Natalie Kitroeff and Ronen Bergman. In the months before the abduction, the wiretaps demonstrated that the cartel "had grown increasingly paranoid, beset by deadly infighting and scrambling to defend its territory as rivals pushed in". Because the cartel used passenger buses to smuggle drugs into the U.S., when dozens of young men arrived in Iguala on buses, the traffickers saw it as an intrusion by the enemy and were triggered to attack them.

Journalist Alma Guillermoprieto notes the messages also demonstrated that while the gang was powerful enough to have police and army in its employ, its operations were less than tight and competent; drug shipments were lost, operatives disappeared, members' water were cut off when bills weren't paid. The night of the disappearance, members of the Guerreros Unidos and the police accidentally attacked a bus of a junior-league soccer/football team returning home to Chilpancingo to celebrate a victory. The police and gangsters killed the bus driver, a teenage player, and a woman bystander before realizing their mistake.

Opponents of capitalism and globalism have called the torture and disappearance of the 43 students fueled by the collaboration between all levels of Mexican government and narcos Mexican state-sponsored terrorism and a direct result of global trade, like NAFTA and Plan Mérida.

== Investigations, arrests and related events ==
=== Impetus for investigation ===
Guillermoprieto writes that the 43 students might have become another uninvestigated group among the tens of thousands of disappeared Mexicans but for the persistence of their parents and relatives.

Unforgiving, stubborn, and extremely vulnerable, the families marched once a month through central Mexico City, putting themselves in front of television cameras, shouting, gathering at the entrance to government buildings, and refusing to budge, demanding the return of their sons. Within weeks, the number forty-three was painted on walls, buses, windows, doors—everywhere in Mexico, and, for a time, throughout Europe and the Americas.

On February 13, 2015, a delegation of parents who traveled to Geneva, Switzerland, with support from a coalition of human rights NGOs, attended the public hearing of the United Nations Committee on Enforced Disappearances (CED), a body of independent experts which monitors the implementation of the Convention for the Protection of all Persons against Enforced Disappearance by the States parties, and submitted the case of the killing and disappearances of their loved ones to the specialized international watchdog panel, further raising international media attention to their plight.

=== Different investigative bodies or claims ===
- Federal Attorney General's office of Mexico (PGR), became involved in an investigation of the disappearances after parents of the students pressured the federal government of President Enrique Peña Nieto to promise an investigation. The version of what happened that the attorney general, Jesús Murillo Karam, came up with became known as the “Historic truth”. Six weeks after the crime, on 7 November 2014, Murillo discussed the investigation's status at a press conference and claimed corrupt municipal police from Iguala and neighboring towns, following orders from mayor José Luis Abarca Velázquez, had turned 43 of the students over to the local Guerreros Unidos ("United Warriors") drug cartel, who then allegedly killed the students and burned their remains in an open-pit fire with tires, wood and gasoline to destroy any unidentifiable traces, and then threw their ashes into the San Juan river. This version absolved the federal police and military of any involvement. Murillo called this version of events the “historic truth”. Doubts were raised about the findings of this investigation and the missing student's parents expressed skepticism.

Groups that helped investigating the students' disappearances on behalf of the victims’ families included:

- Centro de Derechos Humanos de la Montaña Tlachinollan. A human rights group based in highland Guerrero,
- Miguel Agustín Pro Juárez Human Rights Center (aka Centro Prodh), A Jesuit-founded group in Mexico City,
- Inter-American Commission on Human Rights. Its members included Spanish physician Carlos Beristain, former Colombian prosecutor Angela Buitrago, former Guatemala Attorney General Claudia Paz y Paz, Chilean lawyer Francisco Cox and Colombian lawyer Alejandro Valencia, former Guatemala Attorney General Claudia Paz y Paz, Chilean lawyer Francisco Cox and Colombian lawyer Alejandro Valencia.
- Argentine Forensic Anthropology Team.
- United Nations
  - The Office of the United Nations High Commissioner for Human Rights (OHCHR) issued a report on 15 March 2018 providing evidence of multiple human rights violations during the PGR investigation, including 34 cases of arbitrary detention and torture, and the possible extrajudicial killing of one suspect, Emmanuel Alejandro Blas Patiño, who was allegedly tortured to death by marines on 27 October 2014.
  - On October 10, 2014, the United Nations Working Group on Enforced or Involuntary Disappearances; Christof Heyns, Special Rapporteur on extrajudicial, summary or arbitrary executions; and Juan E. Méndez, Special Rapporteur on torture and other cruel, inhuman or degrading treatment or punishment, released a joint statement calling the Iguala attacks a "crucial test" for Mexico's government. "What happened in Guerrero is absolutely reprehensible and unacceptable," the statement says. "It is not tolerable that these kind of events happen, and even less so in a state that respects the rule of law."
- Interdisciplinary Group of Independent Experts (GIEI). In November, 2014, in part at the insistence of the parents of the students, the Mexican federal government agreed to bring in an international investigative team, called the Interdisciplinary Group of Independent Experts (GIEI). Which arrive in Mexico in March 2015. Their investigation was "impeded at every turn". They issued two reports totaling a thousand pages, by the end of its first year, both largely devoted to demonstrating why the “historic truth” version of events could not be true. GIEI's contract "was not renewed", but at their farewell ceremony supporters of their work chanted "No se van yan" (Don't leave us").
- Presidential Commission for Truth and Access to Justice in the Ayotzinapa Case. This commission was created after Andrés Manuel López Obrador (AMLO) was elected president in 2018. Prominent members were Alejandro Encinas Rodríguez, a long-standing ally of AMLO and a former mayor of Mexico City. The head of the new special investigative unit was Omar Gómez Trejo, a young lawyer who had worked on the case at the U.N. and with the GIEI. The commission agreed to bring back the GIEI.
- Two investigations by journalists attributed the attack on the students to the recovery of drugs in buses the students had commandeered.
  - An investigation by Anabel Hernández for Proceso magazine alleged the Mexican Army was involved in the disappearances to recover heroin for a drug lord from two buses.
- An investigation by the podcast Reveal stated that there was not two but one additional bus of Ayotzinapa students involved besides those buses transporting the students who were attacked in Iguala. Police separated this bus (presumed to contain drugs) from the other buses, delivering it to Iguala deputy police chief, Francisco Salgado Valladares.

=== Initial arrests ===
On September 28, 2014, members of the Office of the General Prosecutor in Guerrero arrested 22 police officers for their involvement in the shooting and disappearance of the students. Police chief and Iguala's Director of Public Security, Felipe Flores Velásquez, turned in firearms, police vehicles, time shifts information, and policemen involved in the incident to the Ministry of Public Security. The state government said that the 280 municipal police officers in Iguala had been called in for questioning about the incidents. All but 22 of them were released without charge. State prosecutor Iñaky Blanco Cabrera stated that the 22 officers detained had used excessive or deadly force against the students. The investigations concluded that 16 of the 22 police officers had used firearms against the students. They were imprisoned at the state penitentiary Social Reintegration Center of Las Cruces in Acapulco, Guerrero. A few days later they were transferred to the Federal Social Readaptation Center No. 4 (also known as "El Rincón"), a maximum-security prison in Tepic, Nayarit, under aggravated murder charges.

On 8 December 2014, Attorney General Jesús Murillo Karam stated that at least 80 people had been arrested in the case, and that 44 of them were policemen of Cocula and Iguala. He said that 16 police officers from these two municipalities were still being sought, along with 11 other probable suspects.

=== Scrutiny surrounding Abarca ===
Mexican authorities also claimed that José Luis Abarca Velázquez, the mayor of Iguala and a member of the Party of the Democratic Revolution (PRD), with his wife, María de los Ángeles Pineda Villa, masterminded the abduction as they wanted to prevent them from disrupting campaign events held in the city, although neither of them were put on trial for the students' disappearance.

Soon after the kidnapping, suspicions were raised concerning the potential involvement of José Luis Abarca, the mayor of Iguala; in the past, he had been accused of direct participation in the torture and murder of an activist, while his wife, María de los Ángeles Pineda Villa, was known to be the sister of several known members of the Beltrán-Leyva Cartel.

In response, on September 29, 2014, he claimed that he could not have been responsible because he was attending a conference and after-party when the clashes took place. Following this, he claimed to have left to dine with his family at a restaurant, only hearing of the attack when his personal secretary called him. "After that, I was in constant communication [with the police], giving them orders to not fall for provocations." He also claimed he was not aware of the students that were missing or of the investigation. He pledged that he would not resign and agreed to cooperate if he was investigated.

That day, Abarca met with Jesús Zambrano Grijalva, former president of the Party of the Democratic Revolution (PRD), who requested him to formally petition a resignation. Moreover, one account stated that Pineda had been seen that day at the Acapulco offices of PROTUR, Guerrero's tourist promotion body, in a private meeting with State Governor Ángel Aguirre Rivero. Eyewitnesses reportedly saw Pineda "worried" and "in a hurry".

On September 30, 2014, Abarca asked for a 30-day leave of absence which was granted by the Iguala city council. His absence came amid pressure from other members of his political party, the PRD, who asked him to resign in order to facilitate investigations. Before the official session was over at the city council, federal agents arrived asking for Abarca, but he had already left, resulting in them raiding his house. Rumors suggested that he had fled the country, but investigations concluded that he had left Guerrero with his family, but was still in hiding somewhere in Mexico. Flores was also issued an order of appearance, but he was not located. Protesters demanding justice for the victims marched in several cities.

At that time, Abarca still benefited from immunity under Mexican law, which protects elected officials from prosecution unless they commit a serious crime. In Abarca's case, he was protected from prosecution of common crimes, but not from federal charges.

=== Arrest of Casarrubias, Abarca, Pineda, and accomplices ===
On October 18, 2014, it was revealed that Guerreros Unidos gang leader Sidronio Casarrubias Salgado was arrested by Mexican authorities.

So as to narrow down the search for Abarca and Pineda, law enforcement would locate all the properties owned by the couple and their families. Authorities eventually concentrated on three properties in Iztapalapa, including one thought to be abandoned. In said abandoned property, they regularly saw a woman enter and exit, resulting in them mounting an investigation and surveillance operation on it, in which they would arrest Abarca and Pineda at around 2:30 a.m. (CST) on November 4, 2014. (Note: On October 23, 2014, rumors circulated that Abarca was arrested in Boca del Río, Veracruz. The government later confirmed that the rumors were false. Another version stated that the couple had stayed in Puebla with some friends, and that they were eventually arrested in Xalapa, Veracruz. That version turned out to be false too.) They were found with eight dogs. (Note: Preliminary reports mistakenly reported that the arrest of the couple was made in a different neighborhood, Santa María Aztahuacán.) Neither of them resisted arrest.

Abarca confessed that he was tired of hiding and that the pressure was too much for him. His wife, on the other hand, showed her disdain for law enforcement. The arrest was confirmed through Twitter by the Federal Police spokesperson José Ramón Salinas early that morning. Once in custody, they were taken by law enforcement to the federal installations of SEIDO, Mexico's anti-organized crime investigation agency, for their legal declaration. At the time of their arrest, Abarca and Pineda were among Mexico's most-wanted.

The woman seen entering and exiting the abandoned property was Noemí Berumen Rodríguez, who was arrested by the authorities that day in Santa María Aztahuacán, Iztapalapa, and believed to have aided the couple in their hiding by lending them her house. She was a friend of the couple's 25-year-old daughter Yazareth Liz Abarca Pineda, who was taken into custody along with her parents. However, Yazareth was only considered an eyewitness and did not face criminal charges. Authorities were able to link Berumen with the Abarcas due to her friendship with Yazareth and her presence on social media.

At 5:10 p.m. on November 5, 2014, Abarca was transferred to the Federal Social Readaptation Center No. 1 (commonly referred to as "Altiplano"), a maximum-security prison in Almoloya de Juárez, State of Mexico. He was imprisoned for his pending homicide charge, organized crime, and forced disappearance charges. A judge ordered for Pineda to remain under federal custody for 40 days in order to gather more evidences against her. On December 15, her federal custody detention was extended to 20 more days. She was sent to the Federal Social Readaptation Center No. 4 in Nayarit state on January 4, 2015. Berumen was bailed from prison a few days after her arrest.

== "Historic Truth" version of events ==
A mass grave, believed to contain the charred tortured bodies of 28-34 of the students, was discovered near Iguala on October 5, 2014. However, forensic tests revealed that none of the 28 bodies from the first mass grave corresponded to the missing students, but on the same day four additional graves, with an unknown number of bodies, were discovered.

On October 27, 2014, the authorities arrested several members of Guerreros Unidos; according to officials, two of them received a large group of people from other gang members in Iguala on the night the mass abduction took place. Their testimonies helped the authorities locate new mass graves in Cocula, Guerrero, about 17 km (10 mi) from Iguala. The area was cordoned off by the Mexican Army and Navy before the forensic teams arrived to carry out their investigations.

On November 7, 2014, the family members of the missing students had a conference in the military hangar in Chilpancingo National Airport with the Attorney General Jesús Murillo Karam. In the meeting, authorities confirmed to the families that they had found several bags containing unidentified human remains. According to investigators, Patricio "El Pato" Reyes Landa, Jonathan "El Jona" Osorio Gómez, and Agustín "El Chereje" García Reyes were the members which directed authorities to the location of the bags.

Murillo Karam stated that the three suspects admitted to having killed a group of around 40 people in Cocula on September 26, 2014. The suspects stated that once the police handed over the students to them, they transported them in trucks to a dumping ground just outside town. By the time they got there, 15 students had died from asphyxiation. The remaining students were interrogated and then killed. The suspects dumped the bodies in a huge pit before fueling the corpses with diesel, gasoline, tires, wood and plastic. To destroy all evidence, the suspects also burned the clothing the students had on them. The fire lasted from midnight to around 2:00 and 3:00 p.m. the next day. Once the fire had subsided, the suspects returned to the site and threw dirt and ashes to cool down the remains. They then filled up eight plastic bags, smashed the bones, and threw them in the river on orders from a Guerreros Unidos member known as "El Terco".

At the press conference, a video re-enactment of how the bodies were transported was shown, alongside several video interrogations of the suspects, as well as video of teeth and bones recovered at the site. Murillo Karam said that the remains were badly burned, making DNA identification difficult. In order to properly identify the remains, the federal government turned to a team of internationally renowned forensic specialists from the University of Innsbruck in Austria for help, though there was no definite timeframe for the results. The families of the students, however, did not accept the statements of the Attorney General and continue to believe that their sons are still alive. They said that they would not accept that their children were dead until it was proven scientifically by independent investigators, since they fear that the government is attempting to close the case in order to counter public outrage. Murillo Karam stated that 74 people had been arrested since the case started and another 10 had arrest warrants. He said that until the situation of the students is confirmed, the case remains open and the government formally considers the students "disappeared".

=== Skepticism of Historic Truth ===
Doubts were raised about the findings of this investigation and the missing student's parents expressed skepticism. It rained on the night of the attack, making it unlikely a fire could have consumed the student's bodies; there was a lack of any trace of remains at the trash dump where the bodies were allegedly incinerated; the attorney general's group claimed that the forty-three corpses" had been incinerated by the Guerreros Unidos gang using only "five gallons of fuel”; a video taken from a drone operated by Mexican navy and found by later investigators in 2021 recorded suspicious activity by military vehicles at the trash dump one month after the crime and shortly before Attorney General Murillo gave a press conference claiming to have found remains of the students at the trash dump. Amnesty International described the theory as having been "repeatedly debunked" by "international experts".

=== Related events ===
==== Identification of remains of some students ====
As of 2024, fragments of the remains of three of the 43 missing students—Alexander Mora Venancio, Jhosivani Guerrero de la Cruz, Christian Alfonso Rodríguez Telumbre—have been identified by forensic specialists.

On December 6, 2014, the first of the students, Alexander Mora Venancio (aged 19), was confirmed dead by forensic specialists at the University of Innsbruck. Specialists were able to confirm the status of Mora Venancio by comparing his bone fragments with the DNA samples the laboratory had of his father Ezequiel Mora Chavez and of his brothers Omar and Hugo Mora Venancio. The news was first made public by the student committee of the Raúl Isidro Burgos Rural Teachers' College of Ayotzinapa on the school's Facebook page, and the Argentine Forensic Anthropology Team (EAAF) notified the parents of the student on the status of their son. The committee claimed that the human remains of Mora Venancio were among those located in Cocula, Guerrero. Mexican authorities confirmed the reports the following day at a press conference and released a 10-page report from Dr. Richard Scheithauer, head of the Institute for Legal Medicine at University of Innsbruck, confirming Mora Venancio's status.

After the announcement, classmates, family members, and people close to Mora Venancio paid their respects at his home in Tecoanapa, Costa Chica, Guerrero. The state of Guerrero declared a three-day mourning for his death. In Mexico City, marches led by the students' family members intensified with the confirmation of Mora Venancio's death. "This day of action will continue until we find the remaining 42 alive", the group's spokesperson said in front of thousands of protestors gathered at the Monumento a la Revolución landmark.

On September 16, 2015, the remains of Jhosivani Guerrero de la Cruz (aged 20) were identified. The remains of Mora Venancio were also reconfirmed in the tests.

In July 2020, it was announced that bone fragments found near the location from where the students had disappeared had been tested at the University of Innsbruck and identified as the remains of Christian Alfonso Rodríguez Telumbre (aged 19). An anonymous call led investigators to a specific spot in Cocula, a town near Iguala, where the remains were found — about half a mile from the garbage dump.

=== Arrests, resignations, explanations following initial investigation ===
On October 22, 2014, the federal government stated that Abarca had ordered the arrest of the students in order to prevent them from obstructing a municipal event. The PGR described him and his wife as the probable masterminds of the mass kidnapping. The director of the Iguala police force, Felipe Flores, was also mentioned as one of the main perpetrators. The Mexican government discovered that a local cartel paid the police force US$45,000 monthly to keep them on the cartel payroll.

On October 23, 2014, the governor of Guerrero, Ángel Aguirre Rivero, asked Congress for a leave of absence in order to step down from office. According to Mexican law, state governors cannot resign but may ask for a leave of absence; though an uncommon decision in Mexico at the time, Aguirre decided to leave his post, pressured by his party and public opinion. State lawmakers voted to replace Rivero with Rogelio Ortega Martínez, who served until October 2015.

On October 29, 2014, a few hours after being appointed as the interim mayor of Iguala, Luis Mazón Alonso asked for a leave of absence. He said in an interview that he had decided to resign because some members of the Iguala city council were self-serving and had no interest in improving the situation. He is the brother of Lázaro Mazón Alonso, the former Secretary of Health in Guerrero, who resigned on October 16, 2014, after the former Governor Aguirre accused him of being linked to Abarca. Silviano Mendiola Pérez became the interim mayor of Iguala on November 11.

The Union of Towns and Organizations of Guerrero (UPOEG), along with activists, parents of the missing students, and other drug war victims from different parts of Mexico, organized and led a search in Iguala on November 23 to uncover more bodies buried in the municipality's clandestine mass graves. They uncovered seven bodies in mass graves at a rural community known as La Laguna. The purpose of the search was to locate mass graves for federal authorities to investigate. "We are doing the job authorities are refusing to do", one of the activists said. Locals stated that members of organized crime frequented the area to bury people around there. The following day, the PGR arrived at Iguala to recover the bodies and investigate them. They planned to further their investigations on the mass graves found by the UPOEG. Those present told federal authorities to not allow local officials to intervene in the case. The UPOEG announced that they would be leading a committee to uncover more mass graves in Guerrero. Bruno Plácido Valerio, the leader of the group, stated that from January 2013 to November 2014, at least 500 bodies were located between Ayutla and Iguala. He believes that there are more bodies buried in mass graves all across the state.

On December 3, 2014, Javier Hernández Valencia, the Representative in Mexico of the United Nations High Commissioner for Human Rights visited the Raúl Isidro Burgos Rural Teachers College in Ayotzinapa, and met with the parents of the missing students, other student survivors and activists accompanying their struggle. The resultant public report "Double injustice" is an independent inquiry focused on key aspects of the official investigation under the light of applicable international human rights standards, including the blatant evidence of arbitrary detentions and torture on 51 people indicted in connection to the crime. Although the report explicitly states it does not intend to offer an alternate version of facts nor to identify the perpetrators and their sponsors, it sheds light on the deliberate actions attributable to the PGR to produce "quick results" and solve the crime, which ultimately tainted the investigation itself.

On January 26, 2015, after the confession of one of the men who plotted against the students had been finalized, Mexican officials took it to the media to inform the country that the 43 students had been killed and their remains were burned.

On February 27, 2015, Attorney General Murillo Karam left his post at the PGR. He was replaced by Arely Gómez González and the case was transferred to the Deputy Attorney General's Office for Human Rights, Crime Prevention and Community Services, headed by Eber Omar Betanzos Torres.

On May 7, 2015, Francisco Salgado Valladares, the deputy police chief of Iguala, was arrested by the Federal Police in Cuernavaca, Morelos. He was wanted for his alleged involvement in intercepting the students on their way to Iguala. According to law enforcement reports, Salgado Valladares had connections with the Guerreros Unidos gang and reportedly received bribes from them to hand out to other members of the police corporation. At the time of his arrest, he was one of the most-wanted suspects in the case.

Iguala's police chief, Felipe Flores Velásquez, was also accused and arrested in Iguala on October 21, 2016.

=== Resignation of the PRD founder ===
After meeting with the Party of the Democratic Revolution (PRD) president Carlos Navarrete Ruiz and secretary-general Héctor Miguel Bautista López on November 25, 2014, Cuauhtémoc Cárdenas, the party's founder and senior leader, resigned and issued a letter explaining his departure. A three-time presidential candidate, Cárdenas stated that he had old differences with other party leaders in how to tackle the internal problems of the PRD and on how to help it restore credibility. Days earlier, he had called for all of the national executive committee of the PRD, Navarete and Batista included, to resign for failing to reform the party. According to Cárdenas, the PRD, which governs Guerrero state and the city of Iguala, was on the verge of dissolution following the political crisis caused by the mass disappearance of the 43 students. The alleged mastermind of the abductions, Jose Luis Abarca Velásquez, was a member of the PRD. The incidents in Iguala caused arguably one of the biggest political crises the PRD and Mexico's political left had faced since the party's formation in 1989. When Abarca was linked to the disappearances, many top politicians who had supported his campaign as mayor distanced themselves from him. But many of them also pointed fingers at each other, arguing that some members of the PRD were allied to Abarca.

== Independent investigations ==
=== Inter-American Commission on Human Rights investigation ===
==== 2015 IACHR report ====
Demonstration on September 26, 2015, on the first anniversary of the Iguala mass kidnapping. Mexico City.

In September 2015, the results of a six-month investigation by a panel of experts assembled by the Inter-American Commission on Human Rights became known to the public. The investigation concluded that the government's claim that the students were killed in a garbage dump because they were mistaken for members of a drug gang was "scientifically impossible" given the setting's conditions. But other experts, however, criticized this investigation for its shortcomings and stated that it was possible for the missing students to have been killed at the dump. The government responded to the report by stating that they would carry out a new investigation and a second opinion from other renowned experts to determine what happened the night the students were probably killed.

==== 2017 ====
In July 2017, the international team assembled to investigate the Iguala mass kidnapping publicly complained they thought they were being watched by the Mexican government. They claim that the Mexican government utilized Pegasus, spyware developed by NSO Group, to send them messages about funeral homes that contained links which, when clicked, granted the government the ability to surreptitiously listen to the investigators. The Mexican government has repeatedly denied any unauthorized hacking.

==== 2023 ====
in its sixth and final assessment of the student disappearances, the IACHR announced in July 2023 that it was ending its inquiry. “It hurts to see how a case that could have been solved in the first few weeks ended up entangled in lies, falsehoods and diversions of the investigation.” The Commission stated that using technical analysis of cellphone data that gave the whereabouts of its users, it could place several members of the military at locations connected to the attack that the members had never mentioned in their testimonies. In addition the military had denied access to key documents and withheld details about their involvement in the disappearance and its subsequent cover-up.

=== Journalist investigations ===
An investigation by Anabel Hernández for Proceso magazine alleged that the 27th Infantry Battalion of the Mexican Army was directly involved in the kidnapping and murder of the students. She states that two of the buses the students commandeered contained hidden heroin for transport (unknown to the students), and that a drug lord ordered the battalion's colonel to intercept the drugs by seizing the buses. The students, witnesses of the attack, were killed as collateral damages and the killings covered-up.

An investigation by the podcast Reveal gave a somewhat similar report. It stated that there was an additional bus of Ayotzinapa students involved besides those buses transporting the students who were attacked in Iguala. Police separated this bus from the other buses on their way through Iguala before the Ayotzinapa students were attacked. Only this bus was spared from police gunfire. Then this presumed drug-laden bus was driven away from the violence erupting in Iguala on the texted orders of Gildardo López Astudillo, the local leader of the Guerreros Unidos drug cartel to Iguala deputy police chief, Francisco Salgado Valladares.

=== Text messages between narcos and government ===
Marc Giuffre, a Chicago-based U.S. Drug Enforcement Administration (DEA) agent stated that his office had discovered an ongoing heroin, cocaine, and cash smuggling operation between Chicago, Illinois and Iguala, Guerrero. The smugglers used a commercial passenger bus with a special bumper filled with drugs, then tightly sealed it to avoid detection.

In 2022, a trove of 23,000 text message between the Guerreros Unidos cartel, police, and other government officials were turned over to Mexican investigators by the DEA. It demonstrated that for many months, "just about every arm of government in that part of southern Mexico" had been in the pay of the Guerreros Unidos, providing such services as firearms and hunting down rival traffickers. These "full-blown employees" of the cartel included not only police and elected officials, but an emergency responder who provided minute-by-minute intelligence on police movement, a coroner who provided photos of corpses and a crematory to incinerate bodies. The military were also "showered" with cartel bribes, and though they "closely monitored" the abduction of the students, they never interfered to help them.

== AMLO "truth commission" ==
On December 3, 2018, newly elected President Andrés Manuel López Obrador (AMLO) announced the creation of the Presidential Commission for Truth and Access to Justice in the Ayotzinapa Case, or "Truth commission" (aka Covaj), to lead new investigations into the events. It was led by Alejandro Encinas Rodríguez, a longtime ally of AMLO, and Interior Undersecretary.

According to at least one source (the New York Times), discontent with the "deeply flawed" "Historical Truth" investigation was so deep it helped feed a "wave of discontent" with the Mexican political establishment that contributed to the election of populist López Obrador. AMLO had promised complete transparency and to uncover the truth "regardless of where the investigation led", and many had "high expectations" for the commission. The Inter-American Commission on Human Rights considered this a second period of investigation.

=== Arrests 2020-2022 ===
On June 24, 2020, Salgado's brother and the new leader of Guerreros Unidos, José "El Mochomo" Ángel Casarrubias Salgado was arrested on suspicion of being responsible for the abductions and murders.

In September 2020, the government announced it was seeking the arrest in Israel and extradition of former official Tomas Zeron, one of the authors of the official "historical truth" report.

On September 26, 2020, on the kidnapping's sixth anniversary, arrest warrants were issued for police officers and soldiers. It was the first time arrest warrants were issued for soldiers as part of this investigation.

On January 24, 2021, Luis Antonio Dorantes Macías, the Iguala police chief at the time of the kidnapping, was sentenced to prison for his involvement in the incident.

=== August 2022 announcement ===
In 2022, the commission declared the disappearances a “state crime”, given the "involvement of local, state and federal authorities in the students’ abduction and subsequent cover-up".

Difficulties appeared, such as the Mexican army ceasing to cooperate in the investigation after the November 2020 arrest of an army captain (according to El País).

Arrest warrants were requested by prosecutor Gómez Trejo's team for 83 participants in the events, including

G.U. members; soldiers; police officers; the magistrate at the Iguala police facility; a judge in Chilpancingo who was accused of facilitating the destruction of state surveillance footage from the night of the event; the state attorney general at the time, Iñaki Blanco; José Martínez Crespo; and the commanders of the two Iguala battalions.

On August 18, 2022, AMLO held a conference where Encinas read the government's “conclusions” on the student disappearances. (Neither the investigators—Gómez Trejo, the giei, the Argentines—nor the students' parents and their representatives had been advised of the contents of the report.) It stated that the drug traffickers who killed the students were working with the police and the military.

The announcement was followed by multiple arrest warrants. On August 19, 2022, Jesús Murillo Karam was arrested in Mexico City and charged with "forced disappearances, torture and obstruction of justice" during his tenure as attorney general.

But by October the arrest warrants for military suspects were revoked and the lead prosecutor had resigned. The case against the former attorney general Murillo Karam was later suspended by a judge who "openly admonished the new prosecutors for shoddy work". In addition to Gómez Trejo's arrest warrants being rescinded, many of his investigators were taken from him and sent for “retraining,” and every file in his office was confiscated by a team of auditors.

According to The New York Times, the rush to fulfill AMLO's political promise—that the investigation would be completed by the end of 2022—led to decisions that undermined the investigation and "botched" the prosecution of perpetrators. Encinas did not share evidence with the attorney general's office. In an interview with the Times, he admitted "that much of what it presented as crucial new evidence could not be verified as real."

According Inter-American Commission on Human Rights quoted by Al Jazeera, under the truth commission,

The prosecutors did make progress — a dozen soldiers and a former attorney general were arrested — but the army and navy continued to hide information.

=== Withdrawal of parents' cooperation with official investigation ===
On February 21, 2024, parents of missing students announced they would cease dialogue with the "truth commission". The parents' lawyer accused the commission of "stonewalling the investigation and installing a 'puppet' commissioner".

On March 6, protestors driving a pick-up truck smashed open an entrance to the National Palace in Mexico City, while President Lopez Obrador was holding a news conference inside.

As of April 2024, "there is now a sense that, for all practical purposes, the investigation into the disappearance of the Forty-three has come to an end," according to The New Yorker magazine journalist Alma Guillermoprieto.

== Federal police and army involvement ==
The "Historic Truth" version of events denied any involvement by the federal police and military in the kidnapping and killing of students, but other sources raised suspicions.

A December 2014 report by Anabel Hernández in Proceso magazine provided evidence of the involvement of the Mexican Federal Police and Mexican Army in the case. She states that the 27th Infantry was directly involved in the kidnapping and murder of the students. There were also reports that military personnel in the area knowing students had been shot or kidnapped, made no attempt to help them.

After interviewing Ayotzinapa student survivors, John Gibler concluded that

"...the institutions tasked with investigating crimes of this nature, are the institutions carrying out [the crimes]. Not a corrupt police officer or a corrupt local mayor – no. The local police, the state police, the federal police, the Mexican army, all working together, all using radio communication and using cell phone technology and using their official vehicles, wearing their official uniforms, acting in utter impunity."

On August 26, 2022, Mexican Interior Undersecretary Alejandro Encinas, leader of the Truth Commission, alleged that six of the 43 students were kept alive in a warehouse for days, and then turned over to a local army commander, Colonel José Rodríguez Pérez, who ordered them to be killed. Mexican state-sponsored terrorism, such as the torture and disappearance of these 43 students has been fueled by the collaboration between all levels of Mexican government and narcos.

The federal police were aware of the attack but did not intervene, according to an account put together by investigators "slowly in the course of years", with hundreds of interviews of survivors, eyewitnesses, and participants in the events cross-checked. The military had a statewide surveillance system, including security cameras throughout Iguala, and at least one intelligence agent from one of the nearby military battalions on a motorbike took a few photos of the police attack with his cell phone, but also did not get involved. In another incident, sometime after midnight, a military unit led by José Martínez Crespo (in military prison as of April 2024) searched a medical clinic where some wounded students were sheltering and collected the names of all students there. The Interdisciplinary Group of Independent Experts (GIEI) reported in July 2023 that (according to Reuters) "the Army, Navy, police and intelligence agencies knew, minute by minute, where the students were".

== Protests and activism ==
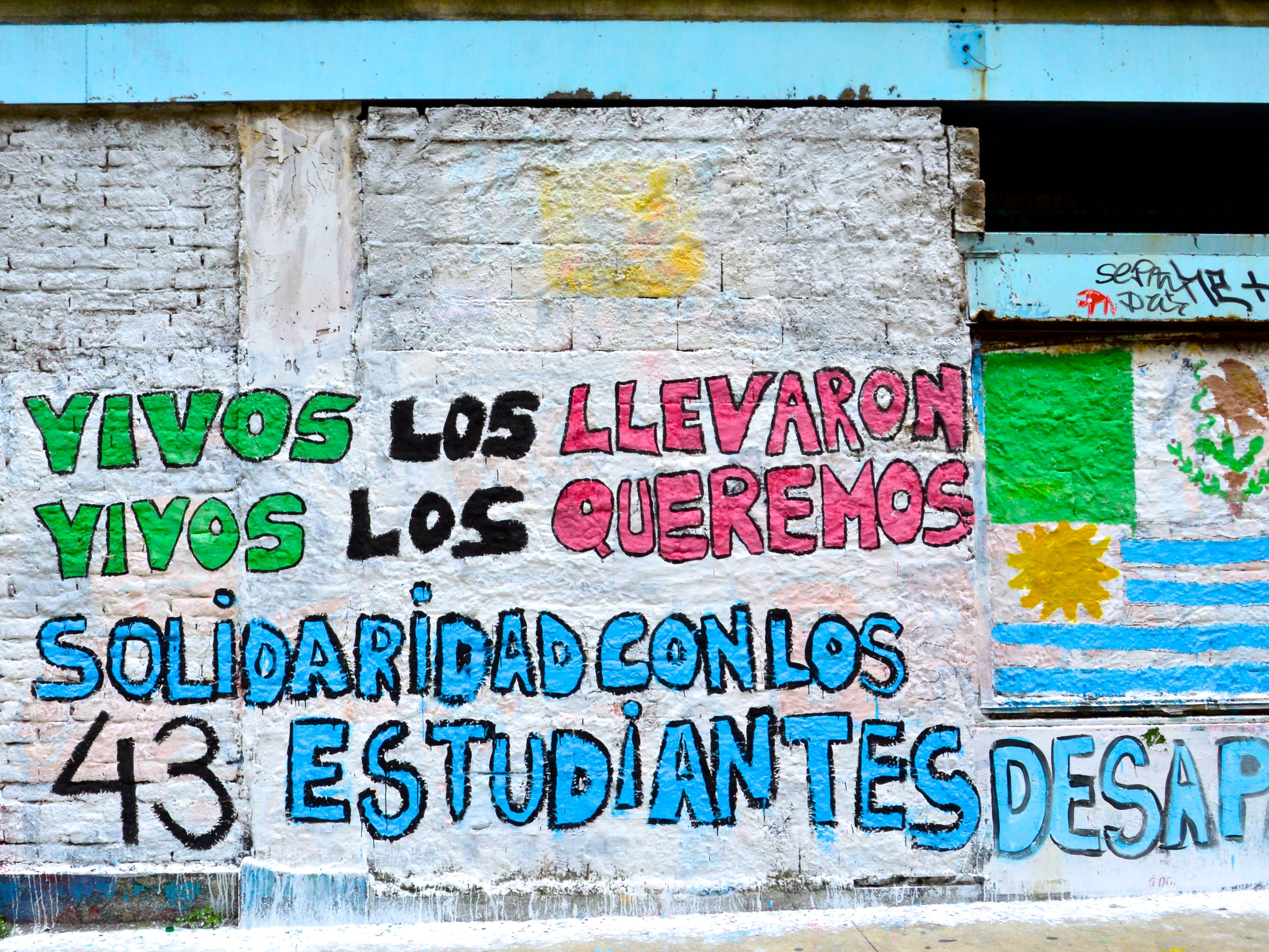
"They took them alive. We want them back alive. Solidarity with the 43 disappeared students," the graffiti, written in Uruguay, reads.

The mass disappearance of the 43 students marked arguably the biggest political and public security crisis Mexican President Enrique Peña Nieto had yet faced in his administration. The incident drew worldwide attention and led to protests across Mexico, and international condemnation. Unlike other high-profile cases that have occurred during the Mexican drug war, the Iguala mass kidnapping resonated particularly strongly because it highlighted the extent of collusion between organized crime and local governments and police agencies. The resulting outrage triggered near-constant protests, particularly in Guerrero and Mexico City. Many of them were peaceful marches headed by the missing students' parents, who come from poor rural families. Other demonstrations turned violent, with protesters attacking government buildings.

On October 13, 2014, protesters ransacked and burned government offices in Chilpancingo, the capital of Guerrero, although the fire was controlled, it destroyed part of the history records of birth, marriages and deaths of Chilpancingo.

On October 20, 2014, masked protesters set fire to an office of a state social assistance program, Guerrero Cumple, in Chilpancingo, burning computers and filing cabinets. On the next day, some 200 protestors set fire to the regional office of the Party of the Democratic Revolution.

Video held of a demonstration in Mexico City on October 22, 2014.

On October 22, 2014 in Mexico City, over 50,000 protesters demonstrated in support of the missing students. Joining the protests in Morelia, Michoacán, were members of Mexico's movie industry – actors, directors, writers and producers- who lit 43 candles on the steps of a Morelia theater. In Venezuela, students also demonstrated in support at the Central University of Venezuela. In the U.S. state of Texas, students and professors rallied at the campus of the University of Texas at El Paso. The name of each disappeared student was read out and signatures were gathered for an open letter of protest to the Mexican consulate. Protests also took place in London, Paris, Vienna and Buenos Aires.

On the same day in Iguala, dozens of protesters, many wearing masks, broke away from a peaceful march of thousands of people demanding that the missing students be returned alive, and broke into the city hall, shattered windows, smashed computers and set fire to the building.

On November 9, 2014, there was a demonstration in Mexico City during which the protesters carried handmade banners with the words "Ya me cansé" ("I've had enough" or "I'm tired"), in reference to a comment made by Mexico's attorney general, Jesús Murillo Karam, at a press conference on the Iguala kidnapping. Protesters also chanted "Fue el Estado" ("It was the State"). Some masked protesters broke away from the otherwise peaceful demonstration as it drew to a close, tore down the protective metal fences set up around the National Palace in Mexico City's main Zócalo plaza and set fire to its imposing wooden door. Clashes with riot police followed.

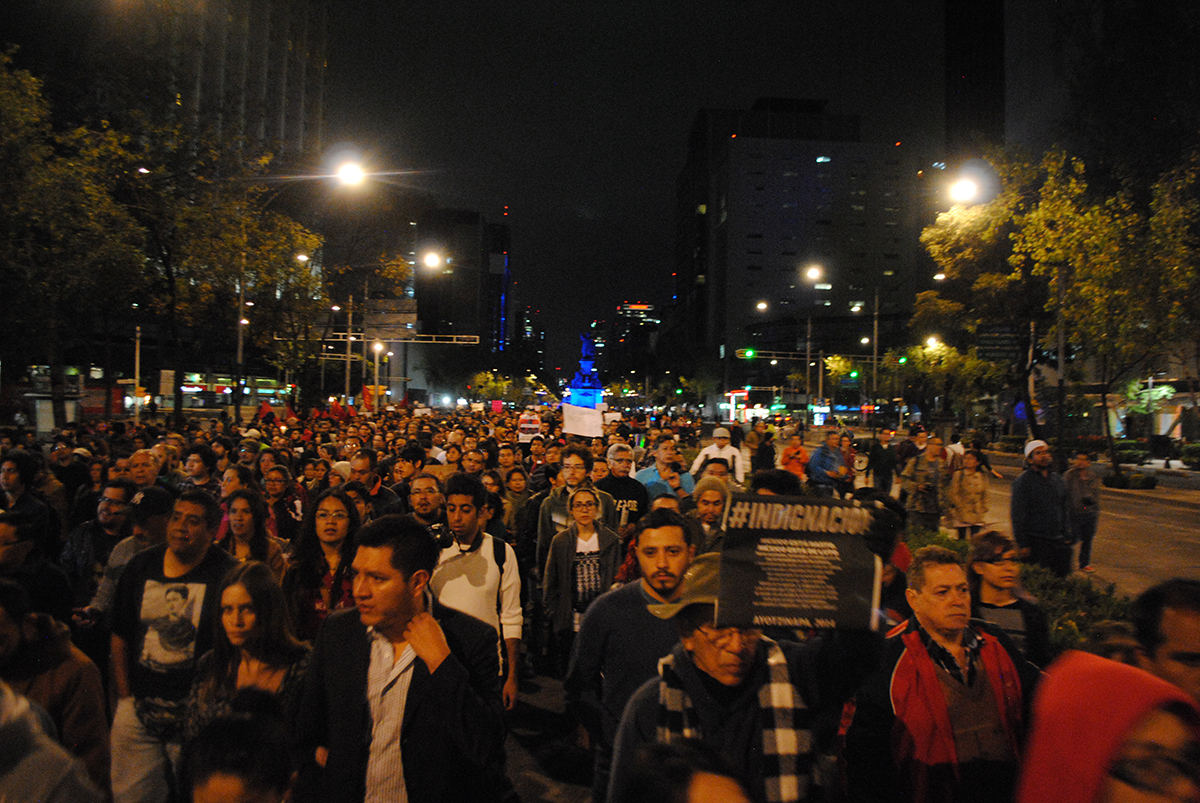
Protesters outside the Attorney General's office in Mexico City demanding the safe return of the students, November 2014.

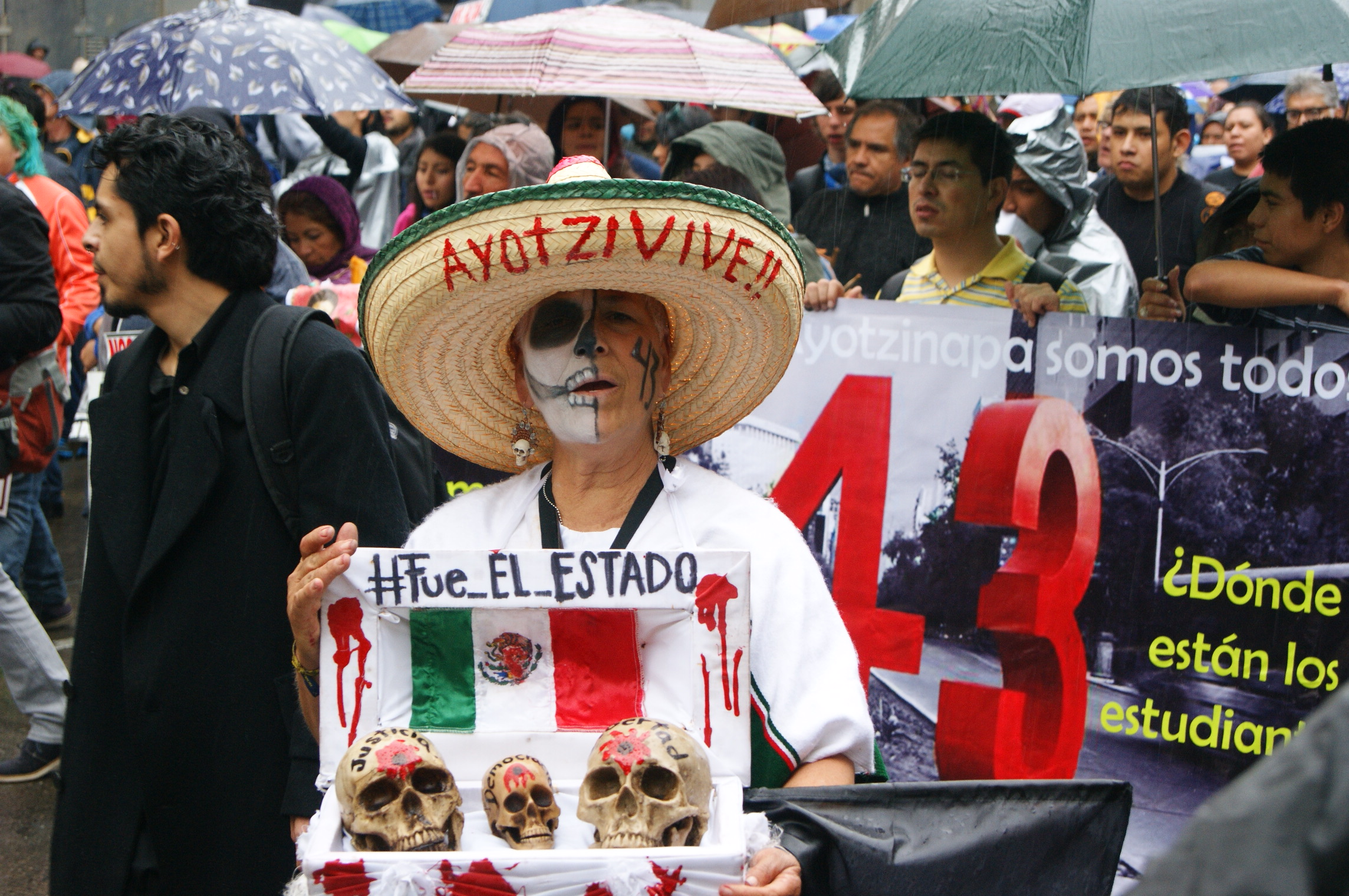
Demonstration on September 26, 2015, on the first anniversary of the mass kidnapping.

On November 20, 2014, relatives of the missing Mexican students arrived in Mexico City after touring the country and led mass protests demanding action from the government to find them. Thousands of people took part in three protest marches in the capital. Demonstrators called for a nationwide strike. Several hundred protesters gathered near the National Palace, small groups of protesters were throwing bottles and fireworks at the palace and the police tried to push them back using water cannons. Near Mexico City International Airport before the marches began, some 200 hooded protesters threw rocks and petrol bombs at police officers who had been trying to disperse them. Protests also took place in other parts of Mexico and abroad. Mexican President Peña Nieto accused some of the protesters of trying to "destabilize" the state.

On January 12, 2015, relatives and supporters of the missing students tried to gain access to an army base in Iguala. The protesters demanded to be let in to search for the missing students. They accused the security forces of colluding in their disappearance. They said soldiers had witnessed a clash between the students and local police which immediately preceded their disappearance, and reportedly failed to intervene.

Opponents of capitalism have called it a direct result of global trade, like NAFTA and Plan Mérida.

=== Nobel Prize Awards protest ===
A young Mexican man interrupted Malala Yousafzai's Nobel Peace Prize award ceremony in a protest over the Iguala kidnapping, but was quickly taken away by the awards security personnel. Yousafzai later sympathised, and acknowledged that problems are faced by young people all over the world, saying, "there are problems in Mexico, there are problems even in America, even here in Norway, and it is really important that children raise their voices."

=== Caravana 43 ===
Relatives of the missing 43 students toured the United States in April 2015 to raise awareness of the events that took place in Iguala. Known as the Caravana 43, the tour was organized in conjunction with a national coalition of social activist groups seeking justice for Ayotzinapa. The tour of 14 parents, students, and advocates was split into three groups that covered eastern, middle, and western regions of the United States, stopping in a total of 43 cities over 19 states before convening for a march to the United Nations Headquarters in New York City. Caravana 43 claimed no connection to any official political party or national organization. Instead, its organization was completely voluntary with transportation and accommodations for the relatives covered entirely by donations from individuals in host cities. Local groups "committed themselves to support the fundamental goal of providing a platform for the parents in the United States and assumed the organizational and financial responsibility for the Caravan." By creating the opportunity for the relatives to travel throughout the United States, organizers hoped to better inform the American public and new media about the attacks and disappearances. In each of the host cities, relatives spoke not only of their loss, but also of the systematic violence and impunity committed by the Mexican government and its police.

Official statements from the tour affirmed that "The problem is Mexico has a long history documented by Mexican and foreign human rights organizations, other governments, and international organizations of using torture to extract confessions which are then used to construct narratives to protect criminals, the police, military officers, government officials, and politicians... Consequently, many people have no faith in the government's account and have demanded that the investigations continue." Relatives met with students, teachers, and laborers, pleading for the United States to intervene in the crisis. Moreover, the relatives asked elected officials to rethink U.S. foreign policy as it pertains to Mexico, specifically in regards to the Mérida Initiative. Many believe that these funds are being used to suppress the people, rather than fight the drug cartels. Caravana 43 achieved relative success in the United States. After meeting with the groups, several legislators voiced public support for their effort. Cristina Garcia, a California Assembly member stated, "It's a human rights violation that's been going on and it affects a lot more than just these students... [The state] has the responsibility to affect change with our border country." Crowds were gathered at each stop and thousands of people joined in social media platforms to promote the tour. The project served as a unifying mechanism not only across international borders, but also for Latino communities within the United States. Following the end of Caravana 43 in the U.S., the parents, students, and advocates hope to continue in their search for truth by organizing similar tours across South America and Europe.

== Witnesses and commemorations ==
An eyewitness who was provided with witness protection by the Mexican Human Rights Commission testified in April 2016 about the involvement of the army and a drug leader known as "El Patrón".

A report from Sputnik news agency says that Roman Catholic priest and human rights activist Alejandro Solalinde said in May 2016 that he had interviewed seven witnesses, one of which insisted that the army was involved.

Jan Jařab of the Office of the United Nations High Commissioner for Human Rights in Mexico condemned the torture of Carlos Canto and 33 other witnesses after a video was released on June 21, 2019.

Bernabé García, a key witness in the case, was given asylum in the United States by an Arizona judge in February 2020.

Ezequiel Peña Cerda, area director of the Criminal Investigation Agency (AIC), was charged for torturing suspects in the Ayotzinapa case on March 17, 2020.

Pablo Morrugares, a journalist for PM Noticias who specialized in drug-related crime, was working the evening of September 26–27 and reported that he had clear evidence of military involvement in the attack on the students. Morrugares was murdered on August 2, 2020.

On September 28, 2020, President Andrés Manuel López Obrador (AMLO) said that he wanted to place all the people who were recently arrested into a witness protection program. "It is also being sought that the detainees can be considered as protected witnesses because there was a pact of silence so that they did not speak and that pact of silence must be broken," he said.

General Salvador Cienfuegos Zepeda, former Secretary of National Defense (SEDENA) (2012–2018) was exonerated on charges of ties to drug traffickers on January 14, 2021. Cienfuegos defended the refusal of the armed forces to participate in investigations into human rights violations in this case or in the Tlatlaya massacre in Michoacan in July 2014 wherein 22 civilians were killed by soldiers. Cienfuegos was arrested on drug trafficking charges in Los Angeles, California, on October 16, 2020, The government of Mexico was widely criticized for releasing Cienfuegos.

Tomás Zerón, exdirector of the former AIC, seeks asylum in Israel after being accused of hiding evidence and torture in the Ayotzinapa case.

Juan Carlos Flores Ascencio, "La Beba", alleged leader of Guerreros Unidos a drug gang implicated in the case, was murdered on January 17, 2021. Two members of Guerreros Unidos in Chicago were identified in September 2019 as witnesses in the Ayotzinapa case.

Reforma reported on January 21, 2021, that "Juan", a presumed drug gang member, alleged soldiers held and interrogated some of the students before turning them over to a drug gang. The witness said that an army captain, who is now facing organized crime charges in the case, held some of the students at a local army base and interrogated them, before turning them over to the Guerreros Unidos drug gang. The Interior Department confirmed that the testimony was part of the case file and said it would file charges against whoever leaked it. Family members of the victims say they believe leaks about the identities of witnesses are carried out with the intention of protecting the army.

Chinese documentarian, artist and activist, Ai Weiwei directed a German Mexican documentary film, Vivos (Lives) that premiered at the 2020 Sundance Film Festival on 24 January 2020. The documentary focused on the families directly impacted by the kidnapping by providing intimate interviews to tell the stories of the victims and their families search for justice. The University Museum of Contemporary Art (MUAC) in Mexico City also held an exhibition by Weiwei using LEGO bricks depicting the faces of the victims and providing key timelines of the events. The exhibition ran from April to October 2019.

In 2024, an anti-monument movement challenging the choice of memorials on Mexico City's Paseo de la Reforma attracted renewed attention to the kidnapping and its aftermath by placing a small memorial to the victims on the famed street.

== See also ==
- Missing persons in Mexico
- 2021 Pantelhó mass kidnapping
- 2023 Nuevo Laredo military shooting
