= Ángel Aguirre Rivero =

Mexican politician

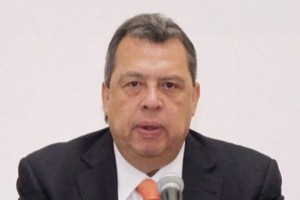

Governor of Guerrero
- In office 1 April 2011 – 23 October 2014
- Preceded by: Zeferino Torreblanca
- Succeeded by: Rogelio Ortega Martínez
- Substitute
- In office 12 March 1996 – 31 March 1999
- Preceded by: Rubén Figueroa Alcocer
- Succeeded by: René Juárez Cisneros
Other offices
Member of the Senate of the Republic
In office 1 September 2006 – 25 August 2010
Preceded by	Saúl López Sollano
Succeeded by	Antelmo Alvarado García
Constituency	Guerrero
Member of the Chamber of Deputies
In office 1 September 2003 – 31 August 2006
Preceded by	Santiago Guerrero Gutiérrez
Succeeded by	Odilón Romero Gutiérrez
Constituency	Guerrero's 8th district
In office 1 September 1991 – 31 August 1994
Succeeded by	Marcelino Miranda Añorve
Constituency	Guerrero's 6th district

Personal details
- Born: 21 April 1956 (age 70) Ometepec, Guerrero, Mexico
- Party: Party of the Democratic Revolution (2010–2024)
- Other political affiliations: Institutional Revolutionary Party (1984–2010)
- Spouse: Laura del Rocío Herrera
- Education: National Autonomous University of Mexico
- Profession: Economist

Ángel Heladio Aguirre Rivero (born 21 April 1956) is a Mexican politician who twice served as governor of Guerrero, as substitute governor from 1996 to 1999 and as elected governor from 2011 to 2014. He represented Guerrero in the Senate from 2006 to 2010 and sat twice in the Chamber of Deputies.

Born in Ometepec, Guerrero, Aguirre studied economics at the National Autonomous University of Mexico and rose through the Institutional Revolutionary Party (PRI). In 1996, the state congress named him substitute governor following the resignation of Rubén Figueroa Alcocer. He left the PRI in 2010 and won the 2011 gubernatorial election for a coalition led by the Party of the Democratic Revolution (PRD). His second term was cut short by the Iguala mass kidnapping of 43 Ayotzinapa students in September 2014; after weeks of protests he stepped down on 23 October 2014. In August 2026 the Attorney General's Office arrested him on charges of concealing evidence in the Iguala case.

== Political career ==
Ángel Aguirre Rivero took a degree in economics from the National Autonomous University of Mexico (UNAM), where he also served as professor in the same faculty. In 1991, he was elected to the Chamber of Deputies for Guerrero's 6th district for the 1991–1994 term and, from 1993 to 1996, he was the president of the PRI in the state of Guerrero.

On 12 March 1996, Governor of Guerrero Rubén Figueroa Alcocer resigned on account of the Aguas Blancas massacre, where peasants were murdered by agents of the state police at the ford of Aguas Blancas in the municipality of Coyuca de Benítez; the same day, the Congress of Guerrero appointed Aguirre as interim governor, where he served until the end of Figueroa's term on 31 March 1999.

In the 2003 mid-terms he was returned to the Chamber of Deputies to represent Guerrero's 8th district during the 59th Congress and, in the 2006 general election, he successfully ran for one of Guerrero's seats in the Senate, both times on the PRI ticket.

On 25 August 2010, Aguirre announced that he was resigning his membership in the PRI and intended to pursue the PRD's candidacy for governor of Guerrero. He subsequently won the 30 January 2011 election and took office on 1 April. (Note: See es:Elecciones estatales de Guerrero de 2011.)

He resigned the governorship in October 2014 in the aftermath of the Iguala mass kidnapping of 26 September 2014.

On 6 August 2026, the Attorney General's Office announced his apprehension being accused of hiding evidence on the case of the Iguala mass kidnapping.
