= Iguala =

City in the Mexican state of Guerrero

- City
- Iguala de la Independencia
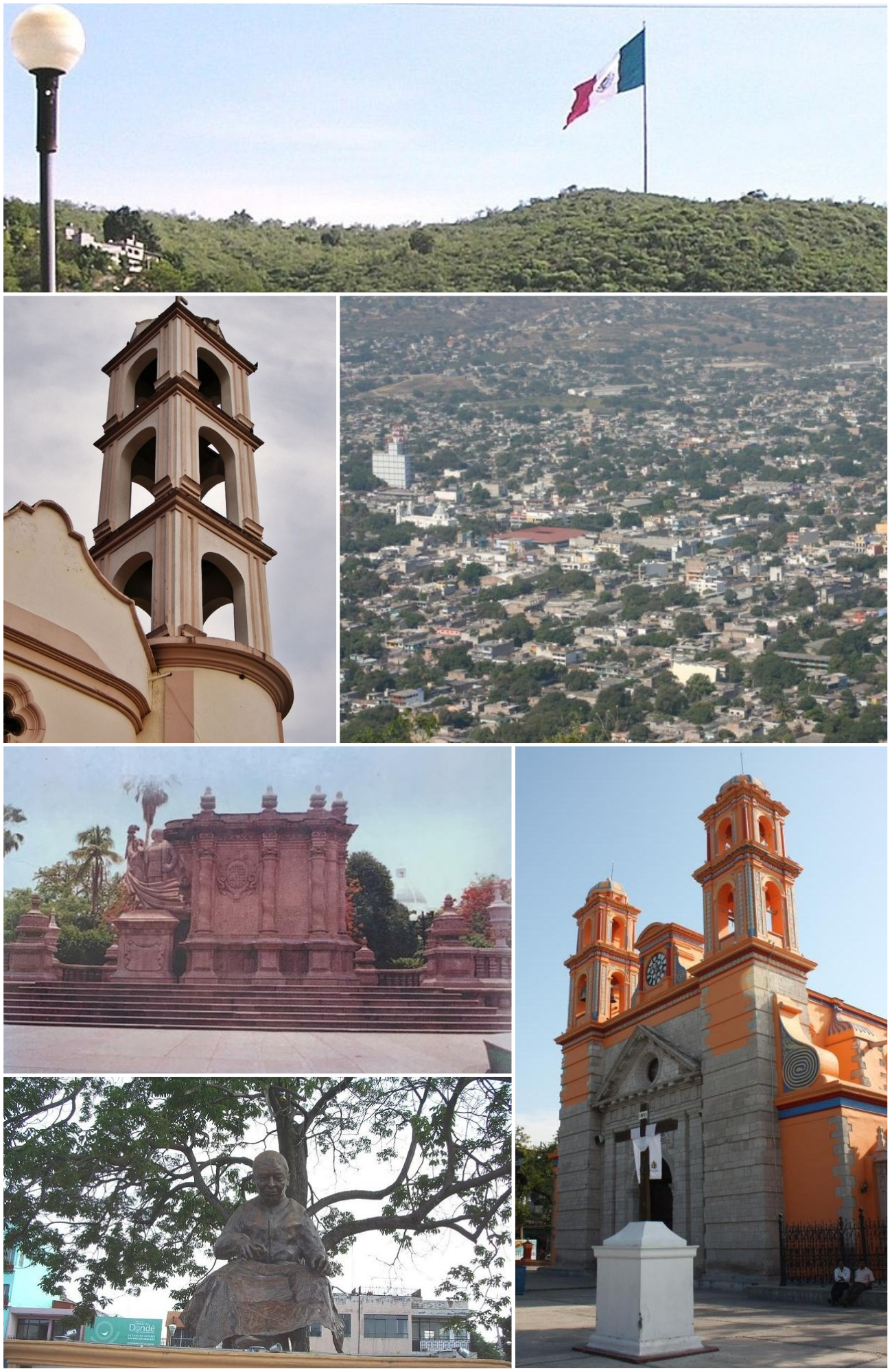
- Above, from left to right: Monumental Flag, San Juan Bautista Parish, view of the city center, the Flag Monument, José Magdaleno Ocampo Monument and the San Francisco de Asís Parish.

- Location in Mexico Iguala (Mexico)
- Coordinates: 18°20′42″N 99°32′18″W
- Country: Mexico
- State: Guerrero
- Municipality: Iguala de la Independencia
- Established: 1347

Area
  - Total: 538 km^{2} (208 sq mi)

Population (2020)
  - Total: 132,854
  - Density: 247/km^{2} (640/sq mi)

Iguala (Spanish pronunciation: [iˈɣwala]), known officially as Iguala de la Independencia, is a historic city located 102 km (63 mi) from the state capital of Chilpancingo, in the Mexican state of Guerrero in southwestern Mexico.

== Geography ==
The city of Iguala stands on Federal Highway 95 about 130 km (81 mi) SSW of Mexico City. Iguala is the municipal seat of the Municipality of Iguala de la Independencia, located in the north-central part of the state.

The city had a 2005 census population of 110,390 and the municipality 128,444. The area of the municipality is 567.1 km^{2} (219.0 sq mi). The city is the third-largest community in Guerrero, after Acapulco and Chilpancingo.

== History ==
General Vicente Guerrero was the first military leader to swear allegiance to the Mexican flag in Acatempan, on March 12, 1821. On February 24, the Plan de Iguala had been signed by Agustín de Iturbide and Vicente Guerrero, ending the long Mexican War of Independence.

Gaining independence from Spain was represented by the first national flag, known as the Flag of the Three Guarantees, which was made by José Magdaleno Ocampo. Thus, Iguala is called the birthplace of the Flag of Mexico.

=== Iguala mass kidnapping ===
On 26 September 2014, 43 students from the Raúl Isidro Burgos Rural Teachers' College in Ayotzinapa were kidnapped, disappeared, and likely murdered, provoking ongoing national protests and international attention. Mexican Federal Police and Iguala's police department and former mayor were implicated in the students' kidnapping and disappearance; members of the Guerreros Unidos drug cartel in the mass murder. The governor of Guerrero state, Ángel Aguirre Rivero, resigned amid the scandal.

== Features ==
The San Francisco Church (Iglesia de San Francisco) is a landmark in the city, built in the 19th century in the Neoclassical style. It is surrounded by tamarind trees, and for them Iguala is known as "la Ciudad Tamarindera" (the Tamarindo city).

The Lagoon of Tuxpan (Laguna de Tuxpan), is a lake in the outskirts of the city, located in the small town of Tuxpan. It is known for its beauty, and popular seafood restaurants. Natives of Tuxpan have worked hard to maintain the popular lagoon healthy for the locals and the city people that visit every weekend.

== Events ==
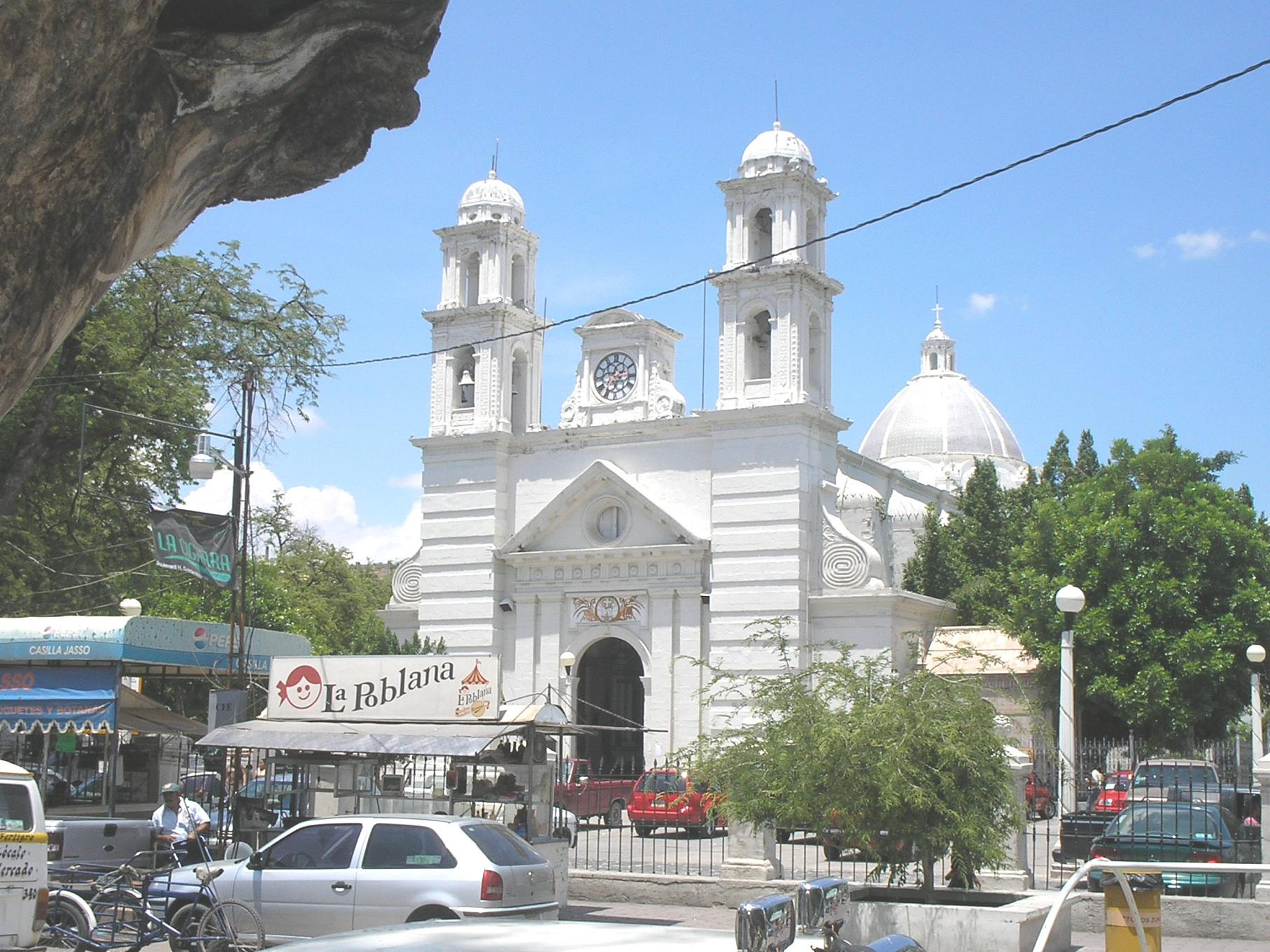
Street scene with the San Francisco Church.

The Iguala Flag Fair is held in late February annually. It is one of the most important annual festivities for the people of Iguala. It is celebrated with a parade of floats, cockfights, and Mexican handcrafts and folk art exhibitions. Iguala's local artisans create gold and silver jewelry.

== Sister City ==
- (United States) Montebello, California (1971)
- (United States) Aurora (2007)
