= Iguala de la Independencia (municipality) =

Municipality in the Mexican state of Guerrero

- Municipality
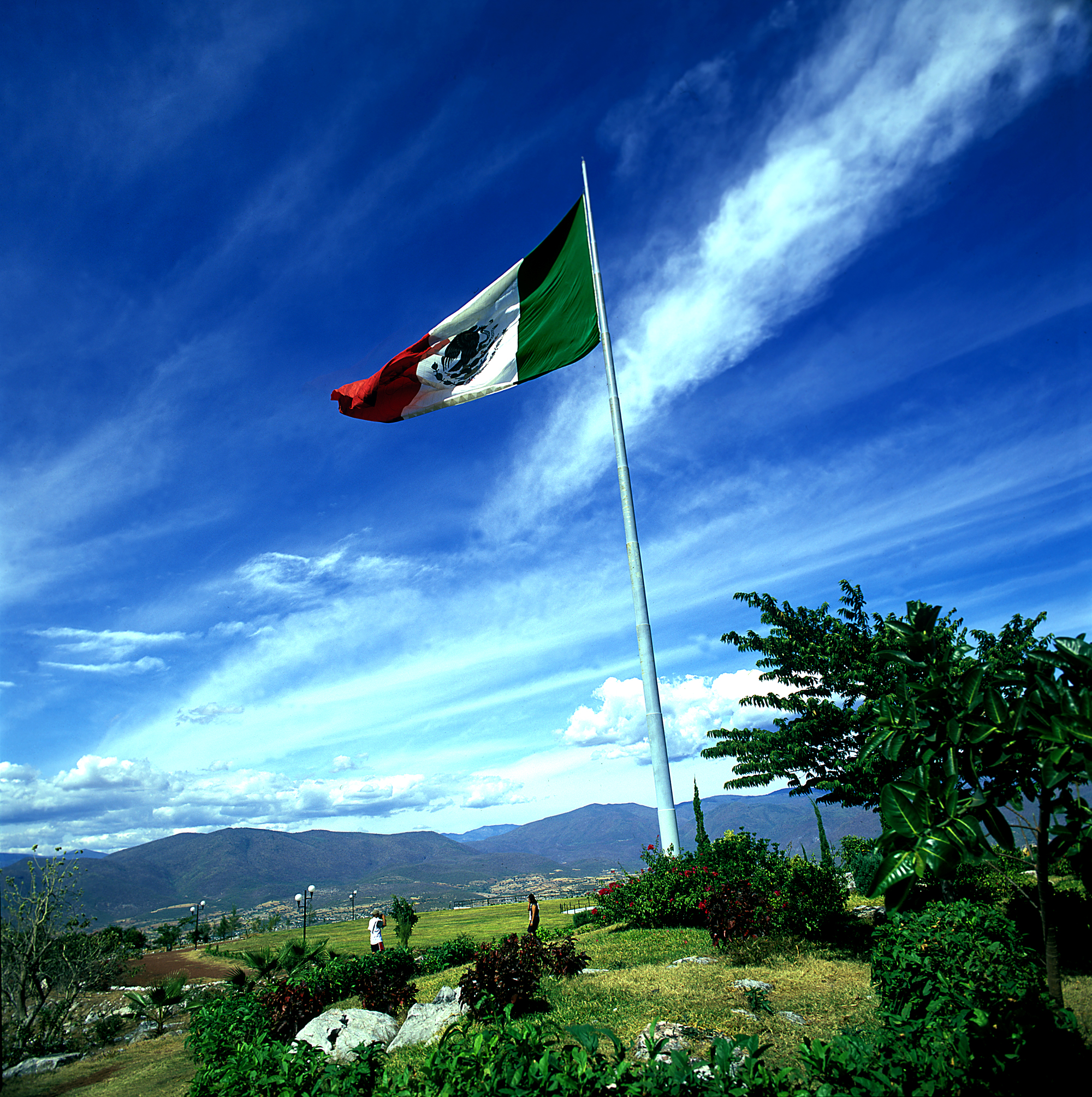

- Iguala de la Independencia in Guerrero

- Location in Mexico
- Coordinates: 18°13′N 99°29′W
- Country: Mexico
- State: Guerrero
- Municipal seat: Iguala

Government
  - Municipal President: Raul Tovar Tavera (PRI)

Area
  - Total: 567.1 km^{2} (219.0 sq mi)

Population (2020)
  - Total: 140,363

Iguala de la Independencia is a municipality in the Mexican state of Guerrero. The municipal seat lies at Iguala. The municipality covers an area of 567.1 km^{2}.

As of 2005, the municipality had a total population of 128,444
