= Saúl López Sollano =

Mexican politician

- Born: Guerrero, Mexico
- Occupation: Politician
- Political party: MORENA

Saúl López Sollano is a Mexican academic and politician affiliated with the National Regeneration Movement. From April 28, 2005 to August 31, 2006, he served as a senator in the LIX Legislature of the Mexican Congress representing Guerrero as the alternate to Armando Chavarría Barrera. In 2017, he left the Party of the Democratic Revolution and joined Morena.
