= Guerreros Unidos =

Mexican organized crime group

- Spanish: Cártel de Guerreros Unidos
- Presence of Guerreros Unidos in Mexico
- Founded: 2010
- Founded by: An alliance in 2010 signed by La Familia Michoacana remnants with Beltrán-Leyva Organization, Tijuana Cartel, Juárez Cartel, and Los Zetas
- Founding location: Guerrero
- Years active: 2010-present
- Territory: Mexico: Guerrero, Oaxaca, Estado de México, Morelos, Quintana Roo; United States: New York State, Miami, Chicago
- Leader: Esther Yadira Huitrón Vázquez
- Criminal activities: Drug trafficking, corruption, extortion, kidnapping, murder
- Allies: La Familia Michoacana; Beltrán-Leyva Organization; Los Zetas; Juárez Cartel; Tijuana Cartel; La Barredora; CIDA; Los Talibanes; CJNG; Iguala Municipal Police; Cocula Municipal Police; Mexican Army(27th Infantry Battalion)
- Rivals: Gulf Cartel; Knights Templar Cartel; Popular Revolutionary Army; Sinaloa Cartel; Los Rojos; La Nueva Familia Michoacana; Los Tlacos

Guerreros Unidos (English: United Warriors, lit. 'Warriors Unified') is a Mexican criminal syndicate operating in southern Mexico.

In 2014, the cartel kidnapped 43 students from Ayotzinapa College in Iguala, Guerrero. A witness confirmed that soldiers in the Mexican Army were involved in the kidnapping, by interrogating the students at the army base in the town of Iguala and then handing them over to the cartel.

Much of what is known about the gang comes from investigations into the disappearance of the Ayotzinapa student teachers, and 23,000 text messages from BlackBerry communications among the gang members obtained by the U.S. Drug Enforcement Administration.

== History ==
In December 2009, a drug cartel lord of the Beltrán-Leyva Organization, Arturo Beltrán Leyva was shot and killed by the Mexican Marines, splintering the Beltrán-Leyva Organization into smaller operations.

Guerreros Unidos was founded in 2010 as two factions from La Familia Michoacana merged an alliance with different cartels. One faction chose sides with the Tijuana, Beltrán-Leyva, Juárez and Los Zetas cartels. Another chose alliances with the Gulf and Sinaloa Cartels. It splintered off from another gang, los Rojos (“the Reds”). It established itself in Guerrero state, near the Ayotzinapa campus.

The faction that chose sides with the Sinaloa and Gulf cartels rivals formed Guerreros Unidos with the remains of the Beltrán Leyva Cartel. Before the kidnapping of the 43 students, it was suspected of attacking a bus of Ayotzinapa activists on 11 December 2011, with Guerrero state militia and police.

== Mode of operation ==
According to The New Yorker magazine, the "specialty" of Guerreros Unidos was smuggling drugs in hidden compartments it fitted in passenger buses traveling to Chicago, Illinois in the United States. In Chicago, a contact of the group (Pablo Vega), would unload and distribute the drugs, according to text messages collected by the U.S. Drug Enforcement Administration.

The gang had many police on its payroll. According to a sworn deposition of a member of Guerreros Unidos (who eventually testified against the gang),

“The purpose of every person who belongs to the organization [is] to send drugs to Chicago, and to keep watch and do what is necessary. ... That is why there should be support by public officials like police officers at every level.”

The gang also employed many lookouts to keep track of movements by the Mexican army, and used real estate and other "traditional" methods to launder money.

== 2014 Iguala kidnapping ==
On 26 September 2014, students from Ayotzinapa College were assisting a protest in Mexico City to commemorate the 46th anniversary of the Tlatelolco massacre. Under orders from the mayor, Iguala Municipal Police, Federal Ministerial Police, Mexican Federal Police, various members from SEDENA, and Guerrero State Police carjacked a bus carrying them to Mexico City. They shot the bus windows killing six students. Witnesses that survived the ordeal described they were taken to the Mexican army base in town, and then the commander decided who would be killed or left alive. The members of Guererros Unidos then killed all the remaining students, burned their bodies, and disposed of their remains in a river. The mayor was then arrested a few months later on November 4, 2014, by PGR and SEIDO agents.
