= Anabel Hernández =

Mexican journalist and author (born 1971)

- Anabel Hernández García
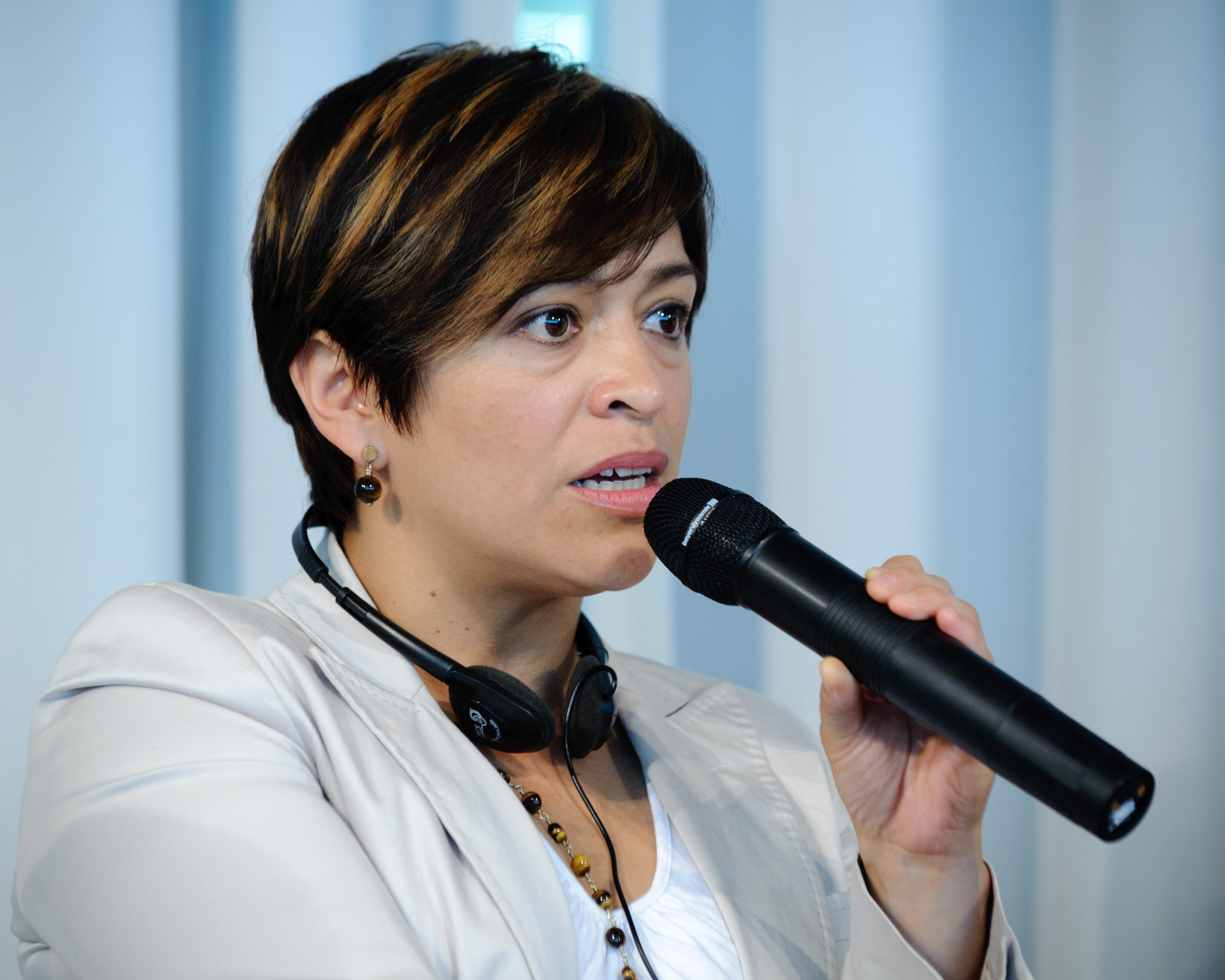
- Born: 19 August 1971 (age 54); Mexico City, Mexico
- Occupation: Journalist
- Years active: 1993–present
- Employer(s): Reporte Índigo (online) and Proceso (magazine)
- Known for: Investigative journalism
- Notable work: Los Señores del Narco (2010); El traidor (2019)
- Awards: WAN-IFRA's Golden Pen of Freedom (2012), National Journalism Award (2002)

Anabel Hernández García (born 19 August 1971) is a Mexican journalist and author, known for her investigative journalism of Mexican drug trafficking and into the alleged collusion between US government officials and drug lords. She has also written about slave labor, sexual exploitation, and abuse of government power. She won the Golden Pen of Freedom Award 2012, which is presented annually by the World Association of Newspapers and News Publishers.

She currently lives in Berkeley, California, U.S., with her two children and has a fellowship on Investigative Reporting at the University of California, Berkeley Graduate School of Journalism.

== Early life ==
Anabel Hernández was born in 1971 and reportedly wanted to be a lawyer since she was a child.

In 1993, at 21, Hernández started work at the newspaper Reforma while still in school. Her first front-page story at Reforma was about electoral fraud in Mexico City. Three years later, Hernández got pregnant with her first child and stopped working there. In 1999, she went to work at the Milenio newspaper. She left Milenio and also her job at El Universal, allegedly because of indirect government pressure on the papers to censor her work.

== First investigation ==
On 5 December 2000, Hernández received a call from her mother telling her that her father hadn't come home the night before. Hernández and family members began the search by first calling on the local hospitals. That afternoon, the family called a radio station to report Mr. Hernández's missing car. Someone called and said they found it, so Anabel's older brother went to the location where the car had been found. Inside the car was one of Mr. Hernández's shoes and the car trunk was stained with blood. By that night the Hernández family knew Mr. Hernández was dead. Mr. Hernández's body was eventually found lying on a highway on Tultitlán, a municipality outside of México City.

The police in Mexico City allegedly said they would investigate only if they were paid, which the family refused.

Hernández employs two bodyguards for her protection.

== Career ==
Hernández is a contributing journalist for the online publication Reporte Índigo and Proceso magazine. She has worked but earlier reported for the national newspapers Reforma, and El Universal and its supplemental magazine La Revista.

Her editorial, "The Perverse Power of Silence", on the importance of a free press in Mexico was included in the 2012 World Press Freedom Day publication. In her editorial, she wrote, "If we remain silent we kill freedom, justice, and the possibility that a society armed with information may have the power to change the situation that has brought us to this point."

=== Toallagate ===
In 2001, Hernández, while working at Milenio, broke the news story about the "extravagance" with which the winning presidential candidate, Vicente Fox, had decorated his personal accommodation using public funds, while he was campaigning on a ticket of "economic austerity". The newspaper published expense reports of President Vicente Fox's government for the redecoration of presidential cabins. The official investigation led to evidence of overcharges, purchases for which there were no orders, and names and phone numbers of companies who had made charges that no longer existed. In Mexico, the scandal became known as Toallagate [Towelgate]. For her reporting, Hernández won the 2002 Mexican National Journalism Award.

=== Drug trade exposés ===
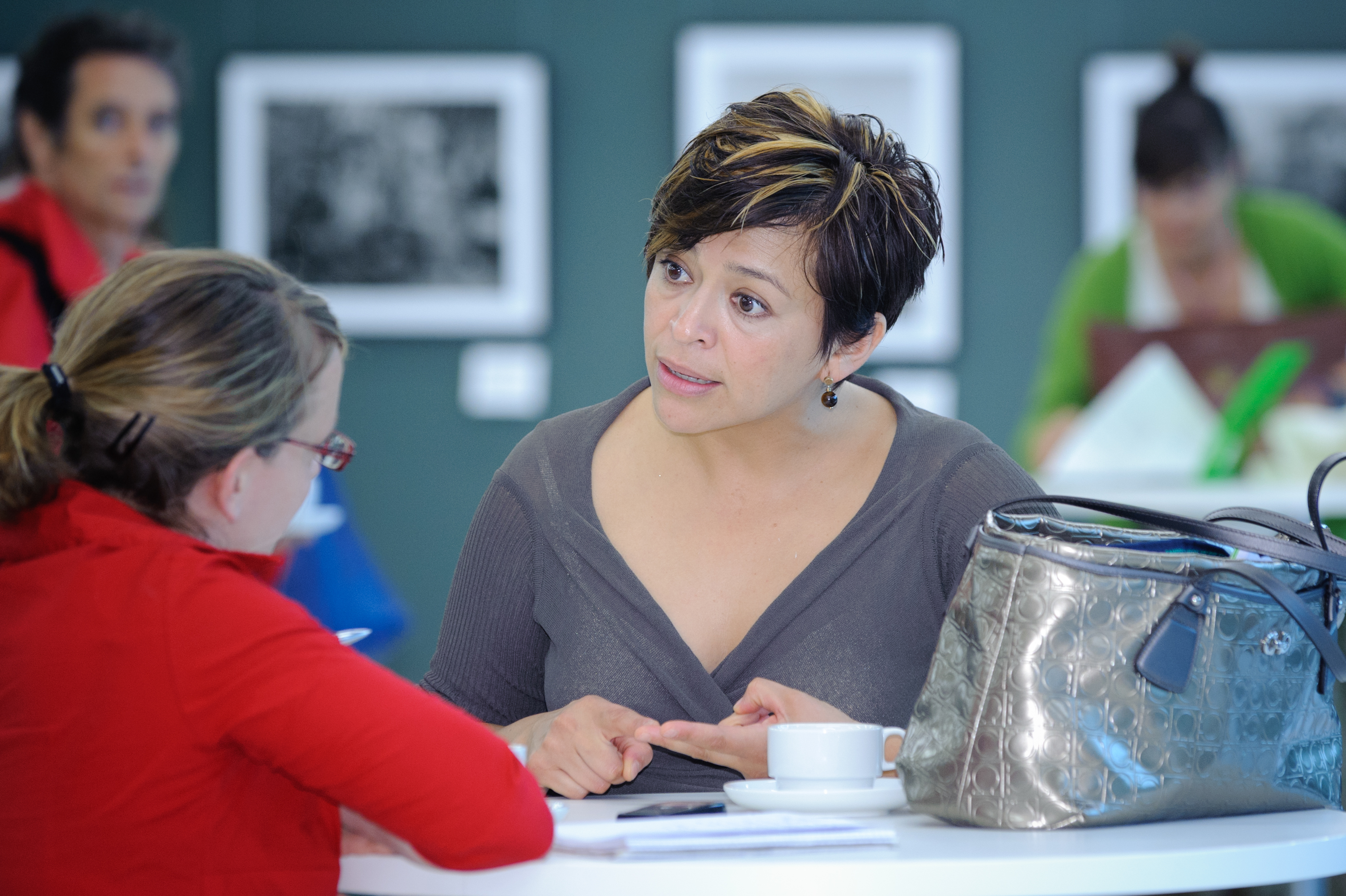
At a public event in Mexico City, 2011

In 2010, after a five-year period of research, Hernández published Los Señores del Narco, later also published in English (Narcoland: The Mexican Drug Lords and their Godfathers). The book has sold over 100,000 copies; Hernández says its popularity is an indication of the absence of information about the drug trade in Mexico. Journalists have been killed every year since the drug war began.

According to Hernández, the complicity of the government, police, military, and business and finance sectors makes the power of the drug cartels and their business possible. She has claimed that, under President Fox, the relationship between the cartels and government changed as Fox sided with the Sinaloa cartel by letting Joaquín "El Chapo" Guzmán escape prison in 2001. Her book details how the Mexican authorities took sides in the drug cartels' infighting.

She has written about the alleged relationship between the Mexican government and United States agents, and the impact it ostensibly has had on the Mexican drug war, including the beginning of the methamphetamine trade by the Sinaloa cartel.

Hernández has received numerous death threats from the government of Mexico itself since writing about the drug cartels and is under protection. She told Narco News Bulletin, "A journalist who has to walk with bodyguards is an embarrassment for any nation. I constantly fear for my health and the health of my family, but the fear only drives me and lets me know that I'm on the right path." She also wrote in a World Press Freedom Day publication in 2012: "Silence is killing men, women and children ... and it is killing journalists. But breaking the silence can also be deadly."

=== Criticism of the Calderón government ===
Her 2013 book México en llamas: el legado de Calderón is an investigation into government corruption and allegations of political complicity during the period of Felipe Calderón's presidency.

== Books ==
- Los Señores Del Narco is a book which focuses on the shocking complicity of high political circles, businessmen, military, and police with organized crime in Mexico. It traces the rise of violent drug cartels in Mexico and exposes the involvement of the government.
- Emma y Las Otras Señoras del Narco / Emma and Other Narco Women: Hernández describes the role of the wives of drug lords, and their drive to seek power, money, and luxuries. This book offers a new insight of drug lords and their inner circle, such as the women within that world.

== Personal life ==
Hernández is the mother of two children.

== Awards ==
- Freedom of Speech Award, from Deutsche Welle (Germany), 2019
- International Journalism Award, from El Mundo (Spain), 2018
- Named a Chevalier of the French Legion of Honour, 2017
- Golden Pen of Freedom Award, 2012
- Recognition by UNICEF in 2003
- National Journalism Award (Mexico), 2001

== List of publications ==
- La familia presidencial: el gobierno del cambio bajo sospecha de corrupción (in Spanish) English translation of title: The Presidential Family. (2005)
- Fin de fiesta en los pinos (Spanish) English translation of title: The End of the Party in Los Pinos. (2006)
- Los Cómplices del Presidente (Spanish) English translation of title: The presidents Accomplices. (2010)
- Los Señores del Narco (Spanish) English translation of title: Narcoland: The Mexican Drug Lords and their Godfathers. (2010)
- México en Llamas: El legado de Calderón (Spanish) English translation of title: Mexico in Flames: Calderon's legacy. (2013)
- La verdadera noche de Iguala. La historia que el gobierno trató de ocultar (Spanish) English translation of title: The real night of Iguala. The story the government tried to hide. (2016)
- El traidor. El diario secreto del hijo del Mayo (Spanish) English translation of title:The traitor. The secret diary of El Mayo's son. (2019) ("El Mayo's son" is Vicente Zambada Niebla, son of Sinaloa Cartel leader Ismael "El Mayo" Zambada)
- Emma y las otras señoras del narco (Spanish) English translation of title: Emma and Other Narco Women. (2022)

== See also ==
- Mexican drug war
