= Ayotzinapa =

- Locality
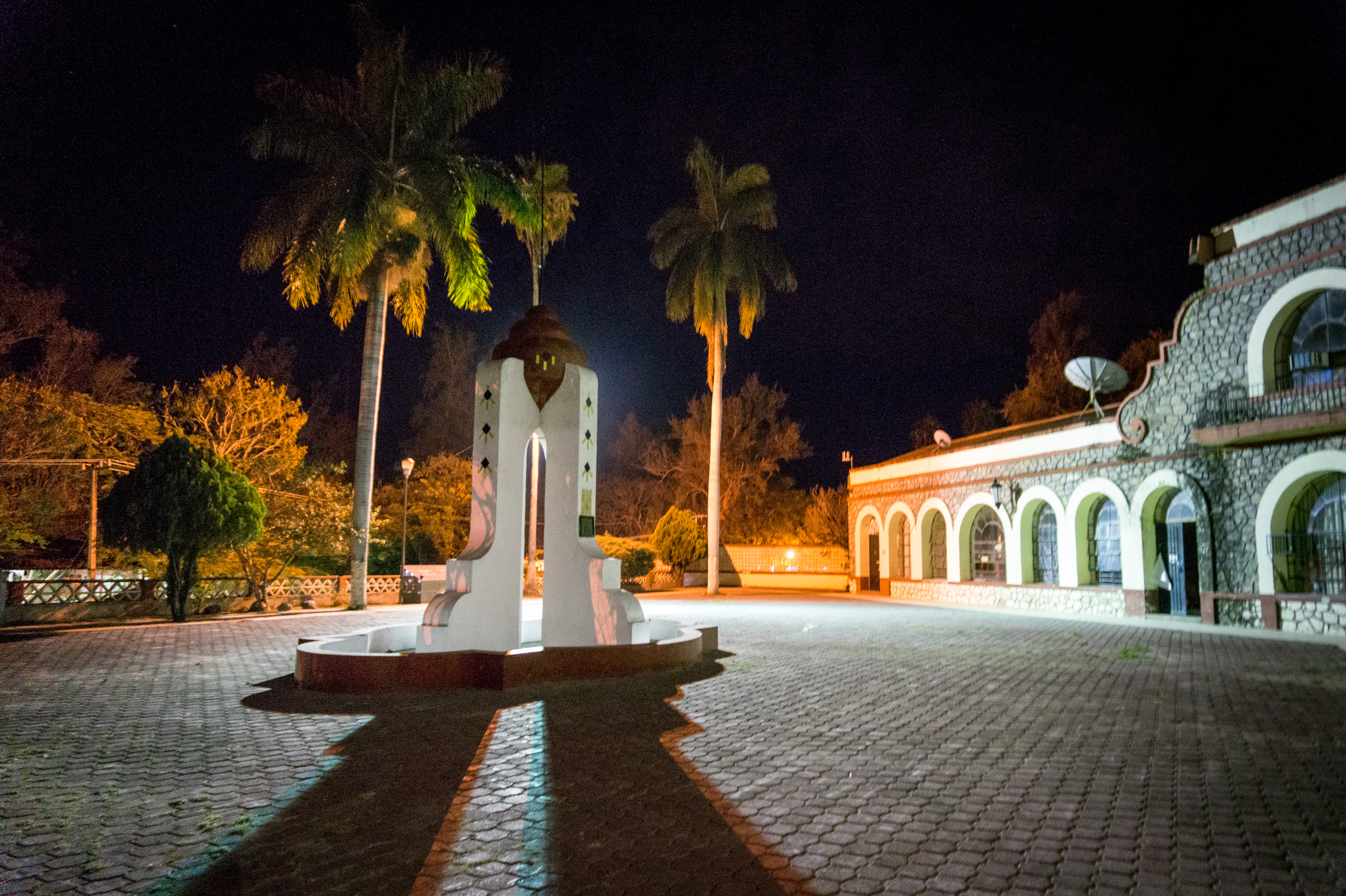
- Ayotzinapa

- Location in Mexico Ayotzinapa (Mexico)
- Coordinates: 17°33′13″N 99°24′37″W
- Country: Mexico
- State: Guerrero
- Municipality: Tixtla de Guerrero

Population (2010)
  - Total: 84

Ayotzinapa is a locality located in the municipality of Tixtla de Guerrero, in the Mexican state of Guerrero in southwestern Mexico.

== History ==
The present locality of Ayotzinapa has its origin in a hacienda that received the same name and owned by Sebastián de Viguri. In 1813 in the nearby city of Chilpancingo, José María Morelos proclaimed the Sentimientos de la Nación, a document that deeply impressed Viguri, especially that part in which he called for the poor's wages to be increased, to improve their customs, driving away ignorance, rapine and theft.

Motivated by this and on his own initiative, on 16 September 1818, he distributed part of the land of his Ayotzinapa hacienda to a group of peasants without property, so that they could work it, and reserved another sector - among which was the old quarter of the hacienda ― so that it would be administered in such a way that, with the products and sales of the crops, the elderly, sick and disabled would be financially supported.

Over time, these lands came to be administered for that purpose by the Tixtla de Guerrero City Council, until 1931, when teachers Rodolfo A. Bonilla and Raúl Isidro Burgos requested the land to establish a normal school on them, which until now that moment it worked in several rented houses in Tixtla; the City Council responded favorably and earmarked the land for the construction of what would be known as Ayotzinapa Rural Teachers' College.

Ayotzinapa attracted international attention because of the Iguala mass kidnapping that took place in 2014.
