= Ayotzinapa Rural Normal School =

Normal School in Guerrero, Mexico

Raúl Isidro Burgos Rural Normal School
- Escuela Normal Rural Raúl Isidro Burgos
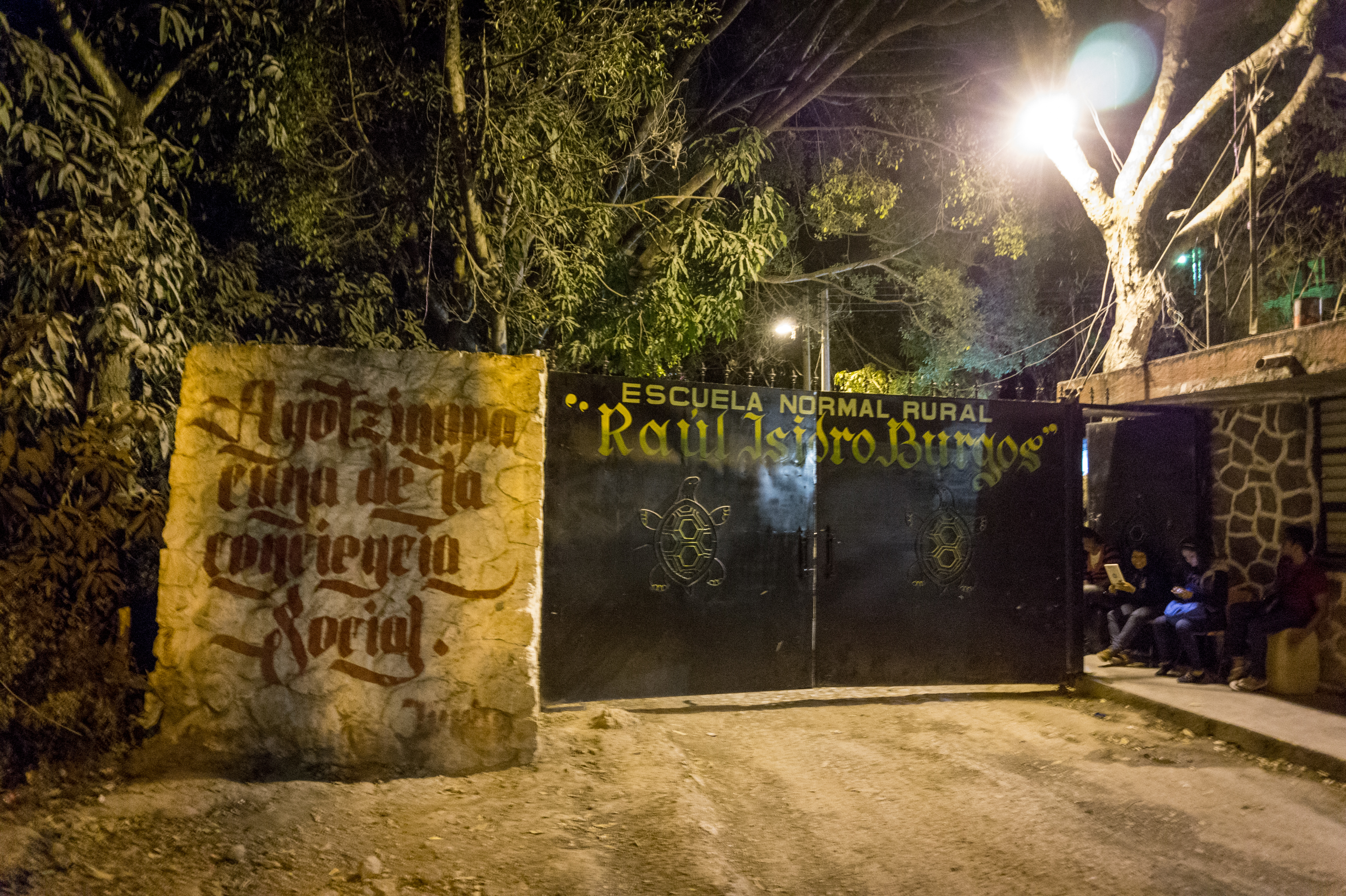
- Entrance gate of the school
- Type: Normal School
- Established: 1926
- Founder: Raúl Isidro Burgos
- Dean: José Luis Hernández Rivera
- Academic staff: 39
- Administrative staff: 6
- Students: 532
- Location: Ayotzinapa, Guerrero, Mexico; 17°33′12″N 99°24′37″W
- Campus: Rural
- Website: www.ayotzinapa.260mb.com

Raúl Isidro Burgos Rural Normal School, commonly known as the Ayotzinapa Rural Normal School, is a men's normal school, located in the municipality of Tixtla, Guerrero, Mexico. The school is part of the rural teacher's education system that was created as part of an ambitious mass education plan implemented by the state in the 1920s. Moisés Sáenz was the head of the Secretariat of Public Education at the time of the school's creation. The project for rural teachers' normal schools had a strong component of social transformation, which has made it a hotbed for social movements. In that sense, Ayotzinapa Rural Normal School is where important figures such as Lucio Cabañas Barrientos and Genaro Vázquez Rojas were educated and later on led important guerrilla movements in the state of Guerrero during the 20th century.

== Education ==
The Rural Isidro Burgos Rural Normal School offers licensing to students that want to work in the elementary education system. The school is regulated by the educational standards that rule the state of Guerrero and in all of Mexico. According to a survey made by the State's Secretariat of Public Education of Guerrero, in Ayotzinapa there were 532 students, served by 6 Technical Support workers. The students are all male. The students come primarily from poor families that live in areas with the lowest human development indexes in Mexico and areas with a high illiteracy rate.

== History ==
Ayotzinapa Rural Normal School was founded in 1926 by the Secretariat of Public Education in Mexico, directed by Moisés Sáenz. These normal schools were based on the ideals of taking education to smaller towns, an idea proposed by José Vasconcelos, the Mexican Secretary of Education at the time. Some of the notable former students of Ayotzinapa Rural Normal School include Lucio Cabañas Barrientos, Genaro Vázquez Rojas and Othón Salazar. Cabañas was a leader of the Party of the Poor, a guerrilla organization with a notable presence in the southeast of Guerrero. Ayotzinapa Rural Normal School's history of educating social leaders has led to its reputation as a hotbed for guerrilla conflict. Every year normalista students went to Guerrero's capital city Chilpancingo, to voice their demands to the government in protests and demonstrations. They sought changes in their institution, including in the budget for students' on-campus living.

=== 2014 Kidnapping ===
Ayotzinapa Rural Normal School Bus Hijacking
- Location: Ayotzinapa, Guerrero, Mexico
- Date: September 26, 2014
- Target: Students
- Attack type: Bus hijacking, mass kidnapping, mass murder
- Deaths: 6
- Injuries: 25
- Victims: 43 kidnapped

On the night of September 26, 2014, a group of students from this institution hijacked some buses hoping that they could participate in the demonstrations of October 2 in Mexico City. Allegedly, elements from the municipal police of Iguala and members of the criminal organization Guerreros Unidos attacked the group of students under the command of José Luis Abarca Velázquez, the mayor of Iguala. This event resulted in the disappearance of 43 students, 6 dead people, and 25 injured. News of the attack made international headlines with numerous international and human rights organizations urging the Mexican State to conduct an in-depth investigation. On October 9, the guerrilla group ERPI, Ejército Revolucionario del Pueblo Insurgente (People's Insurgent Revolutionary Army), announced the creation of Brigada de ajusticiamiento 26 de Septiembre and declared this brigade united against the murder of these students. On January 27, 2015, the Attorney General of Mexico notified about their advances on the investigation on the missing students, clarifying that it was basically an inside job between Guerreros Unidos and the PRD mayor in Iguala, José Luis Abarca. The students were kidnapped, murdered, incinerated and the ashes thrown into a river. According to the official version from the National Attorney, Los Rojos (the rival group of Guerreros Unidos), along with the Dean of Ayotzinapa Rural Normal School, had encouraged the students to go on the demonstrations against the mayor of Iguala. Due to the confusion and the uncertainty about whether or not they were students or members of their rival group Los Rojos, or a mix of both, the Guerreros Unidos cartel decided to just execute these students as they usually would with antagonistic groups and were supported by PRD's authorities in Iguala, given the constant revolts from the students and their frequent protests. The disappearances and deaths of the students and innocents on the buses have played roles in the administrations of Mexican presidents Enrique Peña Nieto and Andrés Manuel López Obrador, as civilians and protestors have demanded a clear and thorough investigation.
