= 1979 Mexican legislative election =

Legislative elections were held in Mexico on 1 July 1979. The Institutional Revolutionary Party (PRI) won 296 of the 400 seats in the Chamber of Deputies. Voter turnout was 49%.

They were the first national elections held after the approval of the political reforms of 1977, which allowed the Mexican Communist Party, Mexican Democratic Party and the Workers' Socialist Party to obtain legal registration and compete in elections for the first time, as well as increasing the size of the Chamber of Deputies from 237 seats to 400.

The elected deputies served during the 51st session of Congress (1979–1982).

== Background ==
The National Action Party (PAN), the only significant opposition to the PRI, did not nominate a presidential candidate in the 1976 general elections due to intense internal conflicts. Subsequently, a legitimacy crisis emerged that called into question the democratic model envisioned in the constitution. Valentín Campa, a well-known union leader and figurehead of the outlawed Mexican Communist Party, ran as an unregistered candidate and received nearly a million votes that had to be annulled.

The September 23 Communist League, the Party of the Poor and the Movimiento de Acción Revolucionaria were among the urban and rural subversive groups whose members were tortured and imprisoned during the 1970s dirty war. A year later, an amnesty law was pushed, fulfilling a leftist demand that this package of reforms lay the groundwork for the end of political clandestinity by creating democratic channels.

=== 1977 electoral reforms ===
On 1 April 1977 Minister of the Interior Jesús Reyes Heroles made a speech in Chilpancingo in which he declared his intention to make significant modifications to the electoral system. The choice of this city for the announcement was intentional, as it was the seat of the organization from which the majority of armed and peasant movements against the government, including those led by Genaro Vázquez and Lucio Cabañas, had emerged. Following the announcement of this commitment, the opposition and academic and intellectual community were invited to participate in discussions aimed at reaching consensus on the reform.

The result was constitutional amendments and the approval of the Federal Law of Political Organizations and Electoral Procedures (LOPPE), which established the structure of the electoral college (a separate electoral body would not be established until Carlos Salinas de Gortari's six-year term in 1990); permitted coalitions; provided for official slots on radio and television for the promotion of various political forces; contained the new proportional representation formula (which distributed 100 seats among the parties based on the national share of votes received); and the number of deputies that made up the Lower House being increased from 186 to 400, which forced the construction of the San Lázaro Legislative Palace to accommodate them.

== Results ==
Party	Party list			Constituency			Total seats	+/–
Party	Votes	%	Seats	Votes	%	Seats	Total seats	+/–
Institutional Revolutionary Party	9,418,178	72.79	0	9,714,151	74.08	296	296	+101
National Action Party	1,525,111	11.79	39	1,485,593	11.33	4	43	+23
Mexican Communist Party	703,068	5.43	18	691,229	5.27	0	18	New
Popular Socialist Party	389,590	3.01	11	380,719	2.90	0	11	–1
Workers' Socialist Party	311,913	2.41	10	294,727	2.25	0	10	New
Authentic Party of the Mexican Revolution	298,183	2.30	12	238,892	1.82	0	12	+2
Mexican Democratic Party	293,540	2.27	10	296,623	2.26	0	10	New
Non-registered candidates				10,748	0.08	0	0	0
Total	12,939,583	100.00	100	13,112,682	100.00	300	400	+163
Valid votes	12,939,583	93.95		13,112,682	95.04			
Invalid/blank votes	833,146	6.05		683,728	4.96			
Total votes	13,772,729	100.00		13,796,410	100.00			
Registered voters/turnout	27,912,053	49.34		27,912,053	49.43			
Source: Nohlen, IPU
