= Party of the Poor (Mexico) =

Political Party in Mexico

Party of the Poor Partido de los Pobres
- Leader: Lucio Cabañas
- Dates active: 1967–1974
- Active regions: Guerrero, Mexico
- Ideology: Revolutionary socialism
- Political position: Left-wing
- Status: Defunct

The Party of the Poor (Spanish: Partido de los Pobres, the PdlP) was a left-wing political movement and militant group in Mexico operating between 1967 and 1974. Led by the rural schoolteacher Lucio Cabañas, the PdlP – through its armed wing, the Peasants' Justice Brigade (Spanish: Brigada Campesina de Ajusticiamiento) – waged guerrilla warfare against the Mexican government in the mountains of Guerrero.

After the death of Cabañas and several other key insurgents at the hands of the government on 2 December 1974, the PdlP was dissolved. Its legacy, and that of Cabañas, remains active in contemporary Mexican radical politics.

== History ==
=== Origin ===
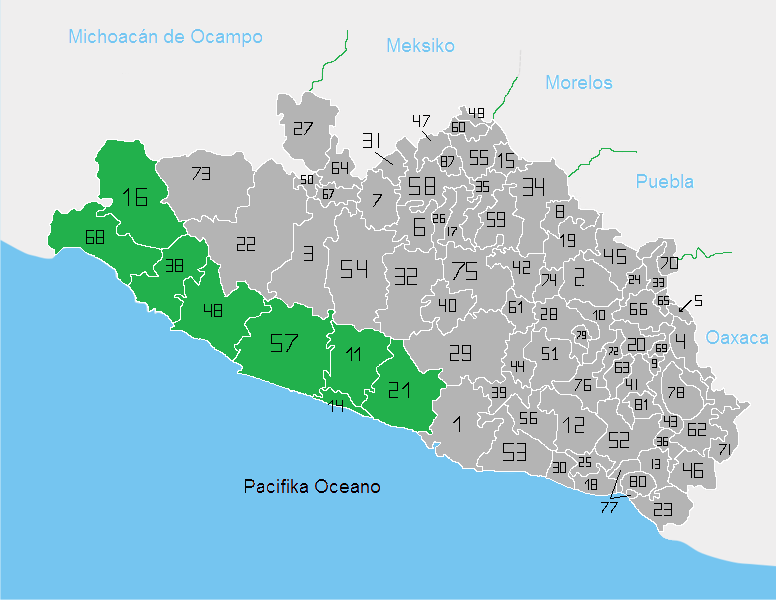
Guerrero's Costa Grande region. Atoyac de Álvarez denoted by "11".

The Party of the Poor was founded in 1967 in the Mexican state of Guerrero as a political organization. This took place in the context of the Dirty War's first beginnings, a conflict between the Institutional Revolutionary Party government and various urban and rural left-wing movements which would last roughly between the Tlatelolco massacre in October 1968 and the late 1970s, and a long period of social unrest in the country. In terms of armed conflict the PdlP was preceded by groups like the People's Guerrilla Group (1963–1965).

Its primary founder and leader, Lucio Cabañas Barrientos (1938–1974), had in April 1967 – together with a group of teachers from the Escuela Juan Álvarez in Atoyac de Álvarez and members from the Confederación Campesina Independiente – founded the so-called Frente de Defensa de los Intereses de la Escuela Juan Álvarez. On 18 May 1967 he organized a peaceful protest in Atoyac, which was attacked by the state police, killing several protesters. As a result, Cabañas was forced to escape into the mountains of Guerrero State, joining the guerrilla Genaro Vázquez Rojas, where the Party of the Poor and the Peasants' Justice Brigade would remain active for almost a decade.

=== Ideology ===
Unlike many other contemporary left-wing guerrilla movements in Mexico, such as the prominent Liga Comunista 23 de Septiembre, the PdlP was not Marxist. It was, however, both revolutionary and socialist. Lucio Cabañas himself had a number of inspirations, for example the Mexican Revolution-era peasant leader Emiliano Zapata (who one of his grandfathers had fought for), and his own Roman Catholic beliefs.

While Cabañas has been called a "Mexican version of Che Guevara", and the Cuban Revolution a decade prior to the movement's formation was somewhat influential to it, focoism and related Cuban experiences did not prove determinative of PdlP tactics and ideology, nor did Soviet Marxism-Leninism or Chinese Maoism, the two major brands of international communism at the time. In the Summer of 1973, Cabañas told an assembled group of urban and rural guerrillas: "The way to make a revolution will not be taught by Cuba... China, the Soviet Union, or any other country." Cabañas also rejected Leninism, stating that: "Lenin's theory doesn't tell us how to form the masses [or] cultivate popular support."

In regards to the group's goals, Cabañas had a programme with several points, that – among other things – called for the defeat of the current government and the establishment of a new one, the expropriation of factories and infrastructure, the enactment of large-scale reforms within sectors such as finance, law and education, social welfare efforts focusing on the urban workers, the rural peasants, the indigenous population and women, and the establishment of an anti-imperialist foreign policy in regards to the outside world, especially the United States.

=== Warfare ===
From his clandestine base in the mountains, Cabañas built a force of about 347 to 350. During its years operating as a guerrilla movement, the Party of the Poor and the Peasants' Justice Brigade engaged in a number of criminal activities in addition to fighting government forces directly, among them kidnapping and robbery. The Peasants' Justice Brigade was present in approximately 200 square kilometers in the sierra of Atoyac, and it was supported by peasant populations.

In 1971 three kidnappings resulted in millions of pesos being paid in ransom. Two of the kidnap victims were personal friends of Mexican President Luis Echeverría. The Central Intelligence Agency believed the group possibly responsible for shooting down a helicopter in April 1971, killing the Governor of Guerrero Caritino Maldonado Pérez, resulting in the death of Maldonado.

There have been allegations from the government and the military that the PdlP partook in the same type of brutal activities it denounced the regime for. According to the retired Major Elias Alcaraz, who participated in the anti-guerrilla campaign, the PdlP frequently executed captured soldiers, and once killed a bridegroom at his wedding because the bride had refused to marry one of the rebels. In 1973 the PdlP kidnapped Francisco Sánchez López, and executed him after his family refused to pay the demanded ransom.

Starting on orders from President Gustavo Díaz Ordaz, the Mexican Army took steps to suppress the revolutionary movement growing in the mountains, which over time grew increasingly heavy. In early 1971 efforts were increased, and all four military battalions stationed in Guerrero were operating against the rebels. A massive new assault dubbed "Operación Telaraña" was launched, with few results. This negative trend continued for the counter-insurgency forces. In mid-1972, after two separate ambushes carried out by Party of the Poor forces against the army resulted in the deaths of 26 soldiers and the capture of more than 50 weapons, reports from the U.S. embassy in the country described mass detentions in Guerrero of suspected sympathizers, and an extensive use of torture during interrogations, and some Mexican human rights organizations count the number of forced disappearances of potential subversives, local civilians, and family members of militants in the hundreds. The number of troops in the region numbered in the tens of thousands.

=== Decline ===
In 1973, and throughout much of 1974, government efforts to subdue the Party of the Poor continued to fail, and decreased in intensity. American embassy reports reflected the perception that the regime's failure was due not simply to poor military engagement, but also because of the vast support for the PdlP found among the rural peasantry. In April 1973, after the Mexican Army announced yet another large-scale assault on "bandits" in Guerrero, the American embassy cabled: "It is apparent that Cabañas and his group operate freely in Guerrero."

One of the PdlP's most major opponents was Rubén Figueroa Figueroa (1908–1991), senator and future Governor of Guerrero, who was in part responsible for much of the repression faced by the guerrillas during the 1960s and 1970s. On 30 May 1974, during the political campaign for the July 1970 Mexican general election, the Party of the Poor kidnapped Figueroa – who had previously publicly dared Cabaña and the PdlP to take him – and four of his aides. Rubén Figueroa Figueroa was freed approximately three months after his kidnapping.

The result of the kidnapping was a massive increase in troops deployed to the area, saturating the mountains with soldiers, and the start of a manhunt that would last until September. This would, in the end, result in the PdlP's defeat. The exact details of the situation are unclear, with conflicting accounts. While the regime held that Figueroa had been rescued in a military operation, which resulted in a shoot-out with the rebels, others have alleged that the politician had been released due to a secret payment to Cabañas - part of a ransom he had demanded for Figueroa's freedom. As a result of the new increase in government presence and repression, the Party of the Poor's luck finally ran out. In a 2 December 1974 engagement, Lucio Cabaña and a number of high-ranking Peasants' Justice Brigade members were gunned down by the army.

=== Legacy ===
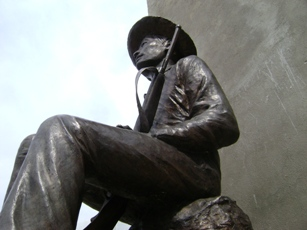
Statue of Lucio Cabañas in Atoyac de Álvarez, Guerrero.

After the collapse of the Party of the Poor following Cabaña's death, some remnants of it joined together with the militant Revolutionary Clandestine Workers' Union Party of the People (PROCUP, formed in 1971), which followed a doctrine that combined traditional Marxist-Leninist and Maoist concepts, achieving "ideological unification" and forming the PROCUP-PdlP by 1980. The group would continue carrying out small armed operations, including assassinations and bombings, throughout the 1980s and early 1990s. In 1985, a group calling itself the Party of the Poor kidnapped the Unified Socialist Party of Mexico politician Arnoldo Martinez Verdugo. David Cabañas Barrientos, Lucio's brother, became a principal PROCUP-PdlP leader, and was imprisoned in 1990 for his alleged role in an assassination. The movement dissolved in 1996, merging with new militant groups such as the Ejército Popular Revolucionario and the Ejército Revolucionario del Pueblo Insurgente.

Lucio Cabaña has become hugely popular among certain parts of the Mexican left in recent years, an icon in the vein of Ernesto "Che" Guevara and Subcomandante Marcos. Throughout the 1990s, posters and graffiti praising Cabaña and his guerrilla fighters could be found in the back streets of many Guerrero municipalities. Often compared to Robin Hood due to their reputation of taking from the rich and giving to the poor, Cabaña and the Party of the Poor are surrounded by a number of folkloric tales and urban legends, among them that Cabaña surrounded himself with a group of beautiful female bodyguards, and carried a bag full of money which he distributed to anyone in need.

In 2002, with the help of forensic anthropologists and archaeologists, family members of Cabañas located his body in an unmarked grave, and identified it with a DNA test. At least a thousand people crowded in the streets to commemorate the anniversary of his death on 2 December, when his remains were placed in an unfinished obelisk in Atoyac de Álvarez's central plaza, a monument constructed without official permission. At the same site a statue of Cabaña was later erected. It has become a somewhat important site for the local left. For example, after Rocio Mesino Mesino (leader of the Campesino Organization of the Southern Sierra Madres) was gunned down in Atoyac de Álvarez, his body was laid at the foot of the statue, where hundreds of people gathered to pay their respects.

A number of left-wing groups in Mexico have been named after Lucio Cabañas in recent years, among them the Lucio Cabañas Barrientos Revolutionary Movement, the Lucio Cabañas Barrientos Community Civic Council, and the Lucio Cabañas Justice Command. In 1997, the late author Carlos Montemayor told the story of the Party of the Poor in his historical novel Guerra en el Paraíso. In 2005 the documentary film La guerrilla y la esperanza: Lucio Cabañas was released, portraying Cabañas and his armed movement.

As part of the ongoing criminal conflict in Mexico, Isabel Anaya Nava, the widow of Lucio Cabañas, was gunned down by two armed men in Guerrero on 3 July 2011.
