= Mexican Dirty War =

Mexican theater of the Cold War (1964–1987)

- Part of the Cold War
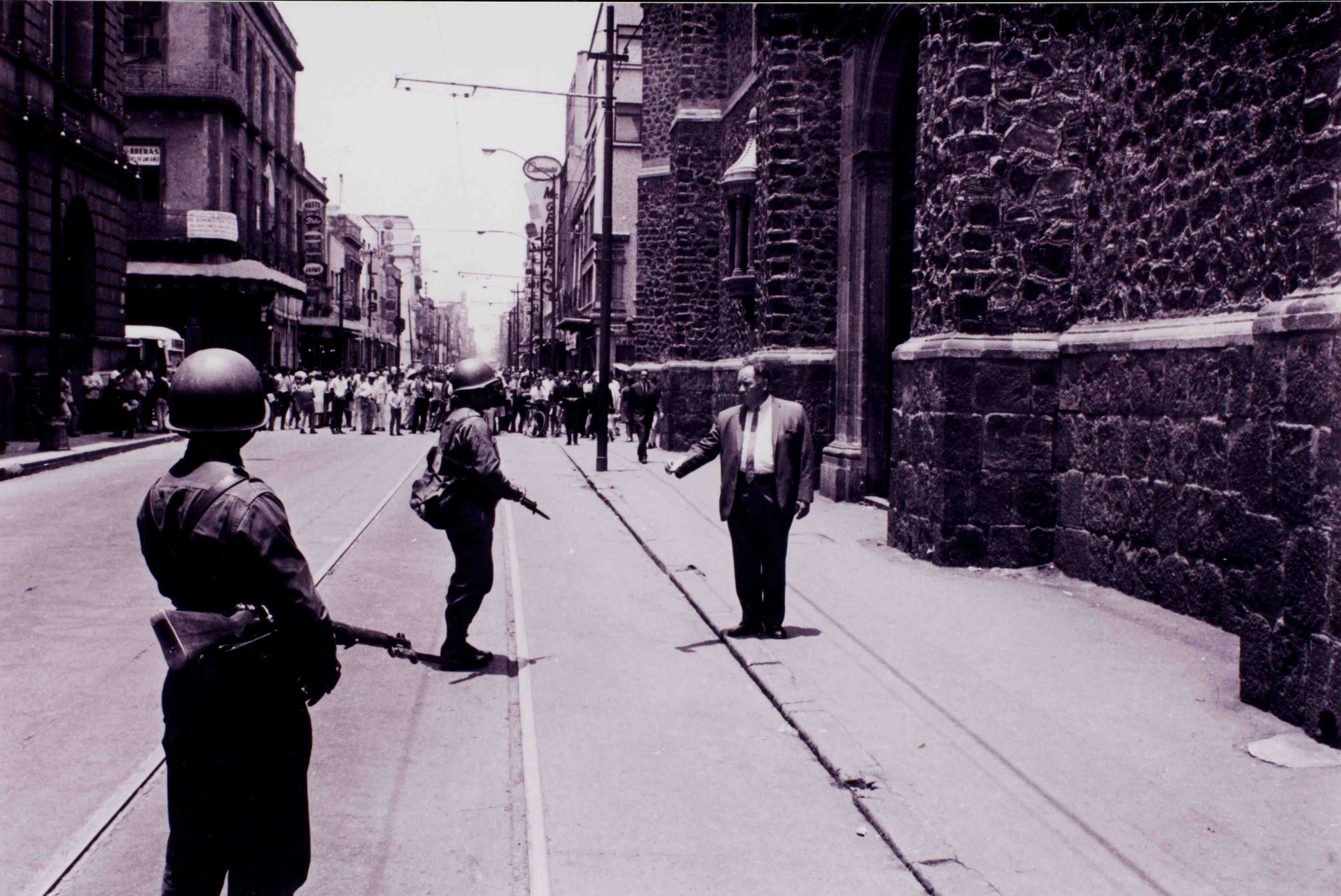
- Mexican Army soldiers in the streets in 1968
Date	1964 – 1982
Location	Mexico
Result	Government victory; Continued rule of the Institutional Revolutionary Party (PRI); Most leftist guerrilla groups disbanded; After the conflict: Several acts of violence have not yet been clarified.; Political defeat of the PRI in the 2000 presidential elections before the National Action Party (PAN).; Grouping of the political left and formation of the Party of the Democratic Revolution (PRD).; Dissolution of Dirección Federal de Seguridad for crimes committed during Mexican Dirty War and for having alliances with Guadalajara Cartel and drug lords like Ernesto Fonseca Carrillo and Rafael Caro Quintero

Belligerents
Far-left groups: Mexican Communist Party; National Liberation Forces; People's Guerrilla Group; Party of the Poor; National Revolutionary Civic Association; Liga Comunista 23 de Septiembre; Various other social and armed movements in the country	Mexico; Institutional Revolutionary Party (Right-Wing faction); DFS - Security Directorate (Intelligence); Armed Forces (Military); Judicial Police (Law enforcement); Mexican Catholic Church; United States (small arms, ammunition, and explosives, as well as supporting the Mexican government and asking for action against leftists)

Commanders and leaders
Arnoldo Martínez Verdugo; Lucio Cabañas Barrientos †; Genaro Vázquez Rojas X Ignacio Arturo Salas Obregón; David Jiménez Sarmiento †; César Germán Yáñez Muñoz; Fernando Yáñez Muñoz	Luis Echeverría Álvarez; Fernando Gutiérrez Barrios; Miguel Nazar Haro; Mario Arturo Acosta Chaparro; Francisco Quirós Hermosillo

Casualties and losses
- Estimated at least 3,000 people disappeared and executed, 3,000 political prisoners, and 7,000 tortured

The Mexican Dirty War (Spanish: Guerra sucia) was the Mexican theater of the Cold War, an internal conflict from the 1960s to the 1980s between the Mexican Institutional Revolutionary Party (PRI)-ruled government under the presidencies of Gustavo Díaz Ordaz, Luis Echeverría, and José López Portillo, which were backed by the U.S. government, and left-wing student and guerrilla groups. During the war, government forces carried out systematic torture, "probable extrajudicial executions", and an estimated 1,200 disappearances.

In the mid 1960s, the PRI underwent a shift where they began to resemble a police state. The start of Mexico's Dirty War was slow and varied on administration and from region to region. In 1965 the Dirección Federal de Seguridad (DFS, Federal Ministry of Security) set up counterinsurgency units and sent military officers to the United States for training. Armed with weapons from Belgium, United States, and Israel, in the 1970s the Mexican government escalated use of violent tactics to silence and repress its citizens. From 1965 to 1982, DFS numbers rose from 120 agents to 1,008. In the 1960s and 1970s, Mexico was persuaded to be part of both Operation Intercept and Operation Condor, developed between 1975 and 1978, with the pretext to fight against the cultivation of opium and marijuana in the "Golden Triangle", particularly in Sinaloa. The operation, commanded by General José Hernández Toledo, was a flop with no major drug-lord captures, but with many abuses and acts of repression.

The judicial investigation into state crimes against political movements opened only at the end of the 71-year PRI regime and the accession to power in 2000 of Vicente Fox, who created the Special Prosecutor's Office for Social and Political Movements of the Past (FEMOSPP). Despite revealing much about the conflict's history, the FEMOSPP has been unable to finalize prosecutions against the Dirty War's main instigators.

In the early 1960s, former schoolteachers Genaro Vázquez Rojas and Lucio Cabañas created their own "armed rebellion" in Guerrero's mountains. Their rebellion group worked to counter other militant groups not aligned with their goals and committed robberies and kidnappings for ransom of rich people in their region of operation to finance their struggle. During clashes with Mexican government forces, both militias and the government used indiscriminate force, causing civilian collateral damage. In 1971, three major kidnappings of rich people produced "millions of pesos" through ransom for the rebels, who used the money to continue their fight against the government and rich, abusive landowners.

In March 2019, President Andrés Manuel López Obrador publicly released the archives of the defunct Federal Security Directorate, which contain a great amount of previously undisclosed information about the Dirty War and the political persecution by the PRI governments. López Obrador said, "We lived for decades under an authoritarian regime that limited freedoms and persecuted those who struggled for social change", and issued an official apology on behalf of the Mexican State to the victims of the repression. He also said judicial action would be taken against the surviving perpetrators of the repression, and promised that surviving victims would be able to claim compensation.

== Events ==
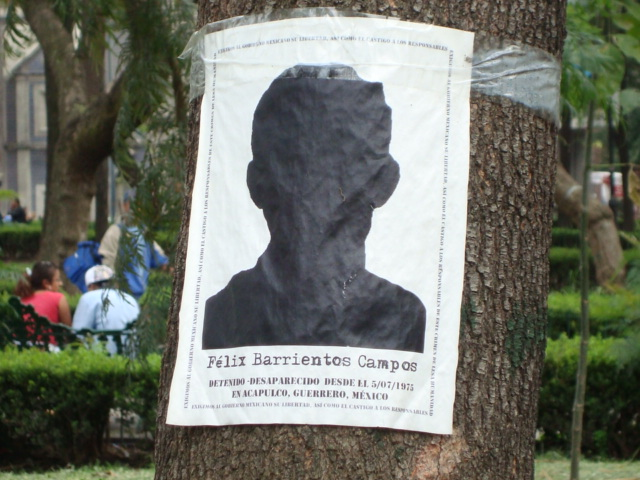
Poster denouncing the forced disappearance of Felix Barrientos Campos, arrested on July 5, 1975 in Acapulco (Guerrero, Mexico) and whose whereabouts were unknown at the date of the poster's placement in 2010. The announcement was placed in the Alameda Central of Mexico City.

The war was characterized by a backlash against the active student movement of the late 1960s, which ended in the Tlatelolco massacre at a 1968 student rally in Mexico City in which 30 to 300 (according to official reports; non-governmental sources claim a death toll in the thousands) students were killed, and in the Corpus Christi massacre, a massacre of student demonstrators in Mexico City on June 10, 1971.

Several mostly independent groups fought the government during this period. Among the most important, the September 23 Communist League was at the forefront of the conflict, active in several cities, drawing heavily from Christian Socialist and Marxist student organizations. It confronted Mexican security forces, carried out several kidnappings, and attempted to kidnap Margarita López Portillo, the president's sister. In Guerrero, the Party of the Poor, fighting against landholder impunity and oppressive police practices in rural areas, was led by the ex-teacher Lucio Cabañas; it carried out ambushes of the army and security forces and abducted Guerrero's governor-elect.

== Cessation of hostilities ==
The legalization of left-wing political parties in 1978 along with the amnesty of imprisoned and at-large guerrillas caused a number of combatants to end militant struggle against the government. But some groups continued fighting, and the National Human Rights Commission says hostilities continued into 1982.

In 2002, a report prepared for Vicente Fox, the first president not from the Institutional Revolutionary Party (PRI) in 71 years, detailed the government's actions from 1964 to 1982. The report states that the Mexican army "kidnapped, tortured, and killed hundreds of rebel suspects" in the period and accuses the Mexican state of genocide. The Mexican Special Prosecutor said the report was biased against the military and that it failed to detail crimes committed by rebels, including kidnappings, bank robberies, and assassinations. But the general consensus is that the report accurately assessed the government's culpability. Instead of ensuring the security of innocent civilians, it victimized and killed them.

== Guerrilla groups ==
1960 marked the beginning of a decade of terror in the region of Guerrero as the state began to deal with the citizens and peasants there ever more violently. The state acted to stifle the numerous political reform movements, as the local people grew agitated with how the government wielded its power and meddled with their rights. As the citizens grew more determined to speak out against the government in the 1960s, the PRI increased its terror tactics in the region. The constant stream of violence pushed many guerrillas to consider taking up arms against the PRI.

The rise of guerrilla groups in the 1960s and 1970s gave the state an excuse to focus its resources on suppressing their activities. The army became infamous for its tactics in repressing the rebels in the rural areas, where such practices such as the death flights, throwing victims out of aircraft, were initiated.

This period of state violence in Guerrero helped to bring about numerous guerrilla organizations. One was the Party of the Poor (PDLP), which was influenced by Marxism and people like Che Guevara. It tended to focus more on the rural regions like Guerrero, where it would be more likely to find support among the peasants. The PDLP became more violent toward the rich after events such as the 1967 Atoyac massacre, where leaders like Lucio Cabañas tried to use the peasants' anger to bring about a revolution.

As the 1960s and 1970s went on, the PDLP gained attention nationwide for acts like kidnapping the prominent PRI leader Rubén Figueroa. This inspired those oppressed by the government, but also marked the organization's decline, as the government began to focus more on taking it out. On December 2, 1974, the army found and killed Cabañas in an attempt to dissolve his movement. Another schoolteacher turned revolutionary, Genaro Vázquez Rojas, founded the National Revolutionary Civic Association (ACNR) as a response to the government's actions in Guerrero. These two leaders and their movements emerged as the armed phase of the social struggle, which continued long after their deaths.

== Torture ==
Torture was one of many tools the PRI used to keep guerrilla groups and political dissidents repressed. Although torture was illegal in many countries during this time, the numerous authoritarian regimes that sprang up from the Cold War used it to great effect. The Mexican state used torture to get information from captured rebels and guerrillas about attacks and plans. During the 1970s, the most violent stage of the Dirty Wars, Mexico implemented new torture techniques that they acquired from abroad. They would be used on individuals they deemed as "subversives." These torture techniques ranged from psychological, waterboarding, to forced disappearances where individuals were killed and disposed of. This was done at clandestine detention centers, where guerrillas were sent to before arriving at a legal prison to keep the state's activities secret. Female guerrilla prisoners were often sexually assaulted by their guards. This, combined with other forms of physical and psychological gender-based transgressions, leads some to believe that the state employed this form of gender policing to deter women from breaking social and political norms. Sexual violence was used as a strategy used against suspected guerrilleras. Some of these victims were as young as ten years old. Women were raped and tortured in front of their husbands and/or children. Mass rapes would occur in communities that were suspected of supporting the guerrillas. The summer of 1970 soldiers launched Operación Amistad where they brutally raped, tortured, and executed individuals in Acapulco.

The detention and torture of political prisoners became more systematic after the student uprisings in 1968, as the government decided that heavy-handed responses were necessary to deal with the unrest. This stage of violent and public repression of differing ideals resembled the regimes of the Southern Cone governments, such as Argentina.

== Aftermath ==
Little is known of the extent of the Dirty War's victims, due to its elusive nature. Part of the problem is that since there was no large-scale truth commission to bring justice to the perpetrators and closure for the victims' families, Mexico never had a "Pinochet moment". It was not until the early 2000s, where a non-Partido Revolucionario Institucional (Institutional Revolutionary Party PRI) president was elected that restricted documents containing information about the violence carried out during the Dirty Wars were slowly being opened to the public. The government also began to call for an investigation on the violence the government carried out on its citizens. A majority of the information that is known about the Dirty Wars is through testimonies provided by those who survived or were affected by the Dirty War and the limited declassified reports the Mexican government has allowed to be public. Since the early 2000s, NGOs have carried out local investigations, providing some insight into the war's tactics and dynamics and the scale of the crimes. One example, conducted by the Association of Relatives of Victims of Disappearance, Detention and Human Rights Violations in Mexico (AFADEM), documented over 470 disappearances at the hands of state forces during the 1970s just in the municipality of Atoyac. In 2002, under the Vicente Fox Presidency, the Mexican prosecutors' office created the Fiscalía Especial para Movimentos Sociales y Politicos del Pasado (Special Prosecutors' Office for Social and Political Movements of the Past, FEMOSPP). Its goal was to investigate and uncover the truth such as the Mexican participation during the Dirty Wars. Because of the lack of information, the prosecutors office has found it difficult to establish an exact number of victims. It has been estimated that between 1964 and 1982, seven thousand individuals were tortured, and around three thousand were killed or disappeared. Another problem is the lack of response to the 2006 report by Carillo Prieto, which documented some of the PRI regime's atrocities. Despite this evidence of numerous human rights violations, ex-president Echeverria and several other PRI officials had their cases dismissed and became free men. The government's failure to address these problems has caused tension, as citizens become distrustful of a state that does not address the old regime and its reign of terror.

== See also ==
- Dirty War – period of state terrorism in Argentina from 1974 to 1983
