= Mario Arturo Acosta Chaparro =

Mexican general (1942–2012)

- Born: Mario Arturo Acosta Chaparro Escápite; 19 January 1942; Mexico City, Mexico
- Died: 20 April 2012 (aged 70); Anáhuac neighborhood, Mexico City, Mexico
- Cause of death: Multiple gun shots
- Occupation: Ex-Mexican Army general
- Employer: Mexico's Secretariat of National Defense

Mario Arturo Acosta Chaparro Escápite (19 January 1942 – 20 April 2012) was a Mexican Army general who was shot dead in an incident in Mexico City. He had been incarcerated in the year 2000 for allegedly having ties with the Mexican criminal group known as the Juárez Cartel; he was later released in 2007 for lack of evidences against him. Acosta was also accused of 143–500 disappearances during Mexico's "Dirty War" in the 1970s.

Acosta Chaparro, son of the Mexican Army general Francisco Acosta Chaparro, was "one of the most controversial military men in Mexico's modern history." He was also one of the most "ferocious" persecutors of guerrilla groups during the presidencies of Luis Echeverría and José López Portillo.

== Acosta's accusations ==
=== Alleged organized crime ties ===
In the year 2000, Acosta was accused for allegedly having ties with the drug lord Amado Carrillo Fuentes of the Juárez Cartel. According to El Universal, Acosta and another Army general, Francisco Quirós Hermosillo, were accused for having ties with Carrillo Fuentes, who allegedly gave large sums of money and gifts to the two generals for protection. All of this information was attained after a protected witness, Gustavo Tarín Chávez—who was even sent to the United States to be interrogated—declared against several members of the Juárez Cartel, naming Acosta and Quirós along with them.

On 1 November 2002, Acosta was sentenced to 16 and a half years in prison for allegedly protecting the Juárez Cartel. By the year 2005, a federal court annulled the declarations of the military court that declared Acosta guilty of drug trafficking. But it was not until 2007 that a panel of judges overturned the drug trafficking allegations because his prosecutors failed to "prove the alleged links to Carrillo Fuentes." He was later released after spending 6 years and 10 months in the military prison. Acosta's general rank in the Mexican Army was given back to him after his release.

Tarín Chávez's court testimony

Tarín Chávez's testimony was read aloud through a microphone in court on the first days of November 2002. According to his declarations, one day Acosta Chaparro answered a phone call and heard the voice from the other line say: "Son! How are you? Son!" Tarín Chávez said that they only person that called him that was Amado Carrillo Fuentes, also known as El Señor de los Cielos (Lord of the Skies), the leader of the Juárez Cartel. During the phone call, Carrillo Fuentes reportedly told Acosta that he had spoken with Rubén Figueroa Alcocer, the former governor of Guerrero, and that "everything was settled." Acosta Chaparro was given the orders to pick up over fifty AK-47s assault rifles, thirty pistols, twenty two-way radios, ten cartridges and a SUV from the drug lord and hand them over to the governor. There were declarations that Acosta planned the arrival of Colombian aircraft loaded with narcotics. Acosta's logistic work allegedly involved the delivery of cars, money, and communication accessories to military officers who worked for Carrillo Fuentes. The regional military commanders of Sinaloa, Durango, and Chihuahua were also accused of being on the payroll of the Juárez Cartel.

=== 'Dirty War' disappearances ===
In the year 2002, Acosta was accused of homicide after the disappearances of leftist activists and revolutionaries during Mexico's Dirty War between the ruling Institutional Revolutionary Party (PRI) and left-wing student and guerrilla groups in the 1960s and 1970s, largely under the presidencies of Luis Echeverría and José López Portillo. A judge declared that Acosta was not responsible for the disappearances and dismissed the charges. El Informador newspaper reported that Acosta was accused in 2002 for the death of 22 peasants in the 1970s, but that the charges were dropped in February 2006 after there were no juridical elements to keep him in prison. In 1968, Acosta Chaparro was part of the Batallón Olimpia, a military-led agency that was organized to suppress the student uprisings; in the 1970s, he was promoted to the rank of colonel and was entitled to form part of a counterinsurgency group. According to the newspaper La Crónica de Hoy, there is a legend that Acosta Chaparro liberated senator Rubén Figueroa Figueroa from the Guerrero-based guerrilla group that was led by Lucio Cabañas in 1974. Acosta was also in charge of a prison in Guerrero, where he reportedly tortured inmates who were involved in the guerrilla campaign. All of them were later released during the presidency of José López Portillo, after he granted them amnesty.

On 30 June 2007, La Jornada newspaper published an article of an incident where ex-guerrilla members and their families complained about Acosta's release from jail and condemned the administration of President Felipe Calderón for doing so. In addition, Andrés Nájera, the president of the Eureka Committee in the state of Guerrero, linked Acosta to 30% of the disappearances during the "dirty war" in the 1970s. He said:

"Out of the 600 that are currently disappeared, more than 200 of them had to do with general Acosta."

The activists then said that Acosta was one of the most "ruthless" criminals in the country, because he allegedly persecuted Eloy Cisneros Guillén and Octaviano Santiago Dionisio, former members of the Party of the Democratic Revolution (PRD) and social activists. In addition, Aurora Muñoz Martínez, the secretary of the Human Rights State Executive Committee (Spanish: Derechos Humanos del Comité Ejecutivo Estatal, CEE) of the PRD, said that she lamented the liberation of Acosta and recognized that no evidence was found against him; nonetheless, she said that Acosta's participation in the "dirty war" left hundreds disappeared. Proceso magazine reported on 20 April 2012 that Acosta was allegedly involved in torture and flying airplanes and throwing the bodies of guerrilla members at the ocean. Francisco Quirós Hermosillo, who was accused of drug trafficking with Acosta, was believed to be involved in the disappearances too. International organizations like Amnesty International blamed Acosta Chaparro for the disappearances of the opposition groups of the government of that time.

During the 1970s, Acosta was in charge of the counterinsurgency operations in the state of Guerrero.

Witness' testimony

On 7 November 2002, El Universal published an article with the confessions of Margarito Monroy Candia, a former mechanic at a military base in Pie de la Cuesta, Guerrero, who declared that Mario Acosta and Humberto Quirós would kill people extrajudicially. In fact, Monroy was the mechanic of the airplane that Acosta allegedly flew to throw the bodies of the activists and guerrilla members in the ocean. According to the testimonies, military officers would make two or three plane "trips" a day, where they would throw the bodies in the ocean; the bodies were reportedly placed in sack bags and filled with rocks before being thrown. One of the pilots who was to serve as a witness is now dead—allegedly shot for confessing against Acosta's supposed involvement in drug trafficking.

Monroy Candia is now a retired military officer; he is approximately 60 years old. When a number of Mexican soldiers appeared at his door on his home in a Mexico City neighborhood, Monroy did not want to speak. Nonetheless, he later accepted to do so and reportedly "spoke for more than 12 hours" on what he had seen in the "Dirty War."

=== 1995 Aguas Blancas massacre ===
During the presidential administration of Ernesto Zedillo, 17 peasants were killed on 28 June 1995 in the village of Aguas Blancas, Guerrero. According to the villagers, they had led a march of over 40 people, asking the government for "fertilizers" and a better lifestyle; then, 17 members of the march were ambushed and gunned down by police officers. 23 others were found injured. Acosta Chaparro was allegedly involved in this massacre.

=== La Barbie's Letter ===
A letter written by the incarcerated drug baron Edgar Valdez Villarreal, alias "La Barbie," was published in the Reforma newspaper on November 28, 2012, after being shown to the journalist Anabel Hernandez. In the letter, which alleges systematic corruption among all levels of Mexico's police forces, Valdez claims that General Acosta Chaparro was sent on a mission in 2009 by President Felipe Calderon's government to persuade Mexico's various rival drug cartels—the Sinaloa Cartel, the Zetas, La Familia Michoacana, the Beltran-Leyvas, La Barbie, and the Juarez Cartel—to agree to a peace treaty. According to Valdez, Acosta Chaparro visited the leaders of all of these groups. Hernandez had interviewed the General two years earlier with the condition of anonymity, and he told her the same story.

== 2010 assassination attempt ==
On 19 May 2010, in Mexico City's La Roma neighborhood, Acosta was injured after being shot four times in the thorax. During the attack, Acosta wrestled with the aggressor, while Rodolfo Chumacero Galindo—a former military officer and friend of Acosta—searched for the gun Acosta "always hid" under the seat.

According to police reports, the general and his chauffeur were inside a vehicle when a gunman who reportedly wanted to steal Acosta's wristwatch shot him multiple times. Acosta was on the wheel when the aggressor assaulted him, and shot him four times while Acosta accelerated. Acosta was reportedly inside his Mercedes-Benz near his home at early hours in the morning when incident occurred. Later investigations mentioned that this assault was probably due to the Rolex Acosta had on him; nonetheless, the authorities did not discard other motives. The Mexico City police carried out an operation in the area to find the gunman; they were able to detain Joel Figueroa Cortez, a man with similar characteristics to those provided by the witnesses of the armed assault. He was later released after there were no elements that linked him to the assault.

The attorney general of Mexico City informed on 20 May 2010 that the gunman that attempted to kill Acosta was under the age of 30, and that he acted on his own. Following the day of the shooting, the authorities were not able to produce a portrait of the criminal to facilitate his capture. A woman and friend of Acosta, Minerva Vanesa Karim Demichelis, was able to describe what the gunman was wearing, but claimed that she was "not able to see [the criminal's] face." Rodolfo Chumacero Galindo, a friend of Acosta, was outside of the vehicle was not aware of the confrontation until he saw Acosta injured.

For more than two years following the attacks, the investigations of this incident were never publicized. The reasons for the attacks were never clarified, although Acosta's ties with Mexican drug cartels or an assassination attempt done by guerrilla groups have not been discarded.

== Assassination ==
On 20 April 2012 at Anáhuac neighborhood in Mexico City, a witness told the authorities that Acosta had arrived at an auto shop to drop off his car when a lone gunman approached him and shot him three times in the head. The assailant used a 9 mm handgun and then ran away to a motorcycle where an accomplice was awaiting for him. The two of them then drove away. According to reports, Acosta was standing nearby a Ford Explorer and talking with two people at around 18:00 in Anáhuac neighborhood right before he was shot. Medical help arrived 9 minutes after he was wounded. When the paramedics arrived, they indicated that Acosta was alive despite having visible shots in the head and thorax. They gave him first aid care and took him on the ambulance. Acosta was identified by the ID he carried. Acosta, however, died on his way to the Red Cross Central Hospital in the Polanco neighborhood. Soon after the shootout, the Federal Police and the SSP guarded the area.

The Secretariat of National Defense (Sedena) said that Acosta was simply picking up his vehicle, but it refused to give more information because Acosta was already retired at the time of the incident. Acosta Chaparro had served for more than 45 years in the Mexican Army.

=== Investigations ===
Two hours after the death of Acosta Chaparro, the Red Cross officially informed through a communiqué that he had died. The attorney general of Mexico City, Jesús Rodríguez Almeida, reported on 20 April 2012 that Acosta Chaparro's death was a "direct aggression" apparently by someone who had followed him all the way to the auto shop. He discarded that Acosta's assassination was simply an armed robbery. According to the authorities, when Acosta was speaking with two people, the killer—a short-size man of approximately 25 years of age, who was wearing jeans and a white-colored shirt at the moment of execution—got close. He then walked past Acosta, turned around and looked at him, and then returned while pulling out a 9 mm pistol, shooting him at close distance as he conversed with a person. There were only three known witnesses during Acosta's execution. 3 bullet casings were found on the scene. The security videocameras of the SSP contain the exact footage when general Acosta was gunned down. The video was finally posted and released on YouTube by several media outlets on 3 June 2012.

=== Aftermath ===
The body was taken to the medical examiner's office at night on 20 April 2012 to determine Acosta's cause of death. After the end of the autopsy at the Servicio Médico Forense (SEMEFO), the corpse of Acosta Chaparro was handed over to his family members early in the morning on 21 April 2012. The family members asked the media and authorities to not release the location the funeral home where Acosta will be taken.

=== Arrests ===
On 4 June 2012, a man allegedly named Jonathan Javier Arechega Zarazúa was detained in connection with the assassination of Acosta Chaparro. The supposed suspected was detained after an anonymous call alerted the police of a man with similar features to the facial composite created by the Mexican authorities with the help of several eyewitnesses in the assassination. In a press conference, the Attorney General of Mexico City stated that there are several witnesses that recognize the 22-year-old Arechega Zarazúa as the assassin. Nonetheless, the detainee has a clean record and declared himself innocent, but will remain under custody for 30 days. He was sentenced to 50 years in prison in January 2013.

== Family ==
Acosta Chaparro's grandson, Horacio Barquín Cevallos, was killed in his house on 28 April 2012 in Taxco, Guerrero. He was serving as a substitute deputy for the Institutional Revolutionary Party (PRI) after Manuel Saidi Prats renounced his party and went over to the Party of the Democratic Revolution (PRD). According to government reports, heavily armed men interrupted his house in Taxco at around 17:40 hours, shooting Barquín Cevallos to death.
