= Atoyac massacre =

1967 killing of protesters in Mexico

- Date: May 18, 1967
- Location: Atoyac de Álvarez, Guerrero, Mexico

Parties
Atoyac peasants	Mexican police

Lead figures
Lucio Cabañas Barrientos	

Casualties and losses
Dead: 5-11; Injured: At least 25	0

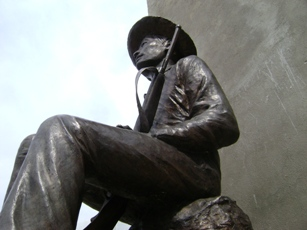
A statue of Lucio Cabañas in a square in Atoyac de Álvarez

On 18 May 1967, Mexican police shot protesters in Atoyac de Álvarez, Guerrero killing at least five people, in what is referred to as the Atoyac massacre. It was part of a series of disappearances, cases of torture, extrajudicial executions and other forms of repression employed systematically against left-wing groups from the 1960s to the 1980s, in what became known as the Mexican Dirty War.

== Background ==
In the town of Atoyac, the director of the Juan N. Álvarez elementary school decided to impose compulsory wearing of school uniforms and high fees for the students, many of whom were living in poverty. This decision was met by opposition by the local community. On April 23, the parents started organizing themselves, informing at the same time parents of children from other schools and the local population.

== The events ==
On May 17, the parents found out that judicial police were coming to the town in order to take control of the school. Thus, they decided not to send their children to school the following day and on May 18, they gathered to protest, with teacher Lucio Cabañas acting as speaker. When Cabañas tried to participate in the event, the police intervened to stop him, shooting against the crowd and killing at least 5 people, with estimates of up to 11, and wounding several others.

== Aftermath ==
Lucio Cabañas managed to escape and, being under persecution from the authorities, created a guerilla group that operated on the mountains of the Guerrero region for the next seven years, fighting for the improvement of the peasants living conditions and against political repression.
