= Liga Comunista 23 de Septiembre =

Marxist-Leninist urban guerrilla movement in Mexico

September 23rd Communist League
- Liga Comunista 23 de Septiembre
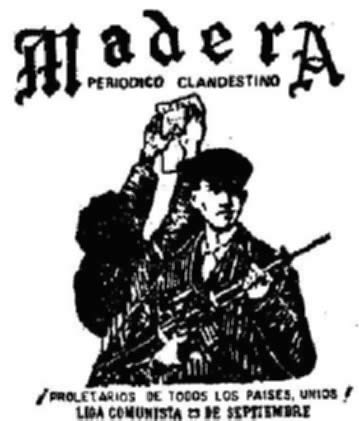
- Madera, newsletter of the LC23S
- Leaders: Ignacio Arturo Salas Obregón (1973-1974) †; David Jimenez Sarmiento (1974-1976) †; Luis Miguel Corral García (1976-1977) †; Miguel Ángel Barraza García (1977-1981) †; Coordinación Nacional Provisional (1981-1982)
- Dates active: 1973–1983
- Headquarters: Guadalajara (1973-1974); Mexico City (1974-1982)
- Ideology: Marxism–Leninism; Council communism (Later)
- Political position: Far-left
- Status: Inactive
- Wars: the Dirty War (Mexico)

The Liga Comunista 23 de Septiembre (English: September 23rd Communist League), or LC23S, was a Marxist-Leninist and later council communist urban guerrilla movement that emerged in Mexico in the early 1970s. The result of the merging of various armed revolutionary organizations active in Mexico prior to 1974, with the objective of creating a united front to combat the Mexican government; the name was chosen to commemorate an unsuccessful guerrilla assault on the barracks of Ciudad Madera in the northern state of Chihuahua led by former schoolteacher Arturo Gámiz and the People's Guerrilla Group on September 23, 1965. The LC23S' militancy was made up mainly of young disenfranchised university students who saw any opportunity of a peaceful political transformation die in the aftermath of the 1968 student movement and then to be buried in the violent crackdown of 1971. Its long term objective was the “elimination of the capitalist system and bourgeois democracy, which would be replaced by a socialist republic and the dictatorship of the proletariat”.

Labeled a terrorist organization by the Mexican authorities, the LC23S engaged in numerous violent attacks, both against what they considered their "class enemy" (the bourgeoisie) and the authoritarian government of the Institutional Revolutionary Party (PRI). At that point, this party had held the presidency for more than 40 years since the end of the Mexican Revolution and, through acts of political corruption, co-opting of opposition and violent repression, had eliminated most political dissent. Although the League saw itself as the vanguard of the proletariat, it never really penetrated the minds of the workers or peasants. Hundreds of young militants died during that time, with many more still considered missing. Without having a social base in the workers' sphere and with a disbandment of militants who saw an opportunity of activism in the aftermath of the new legal framework, the September 23rd Communist League disappeared at the beginning of the eighties.

== Massacre of Corpus Christi ==
From his earliest days in office, President Luis Echeverría Álvarez announced intentions to reform democracy in Mexico. Students were excited and thought they would have the opportunity to return to the streets to demonstrate discomfort against the government. A conflict at the University of Nuevo León gave them an opportunity to test this new freedom. The National Autonomous University of Mexico and National Polytechnic Institute immediately responded and the students called for a massive rally in support of Nuevo León on June 10, 1971.

The march started at the Casco de Santo Tomás, and proceeded through Carpio and Maestros Avenues so the protesters could take the Mexico-Tacuba Causeway, and eventually end up at Zócalo. The streets leading to the Maestros Avenue were blocked by police officers and riot police, who did not allow the students to pass. There were tankettes parked along Melchor Ocampo Avenue, near the military school, and riot police trucks in a large police contingent at the intersection of the Melchor Ocampo and San Cosme Avenues. A shock group trained by the Federal Security Directorate and the CIA, known as "los Halcones", who came in grey trucks, vans, and riot trucks, attacked students from streets near Maestros Avenue after the riot police opened their blockade. The shock group first attacked with bamboo and kendo sticks so the students easily repelled them. Los Halcones then attacked the students again, with high-caliber rifles, while students tried, unsuccessfully, to hide. Even though the area was surrounded by police officers, there was no intervention in the clashes. The shooting lasted for several minutes, during which some cars gave logistical support to the paramilitary group. The death toll is controversial, but it is considered to be close to 120 people, in a moderate calculation.

== Local repression ==
Even though, in Mexico City, the social unrest and the following repression that started back in the fifties and sixties greatly influenced the development of subsequent popular movements, in the rest of the country this was not the case. Each state had, in varying degrees, its own expression of authoritarian politics and repression of dissent. While in the northern states, like Sonora and Chihuahua, the government's strategy (in a joint effort with the news media) was that of politically discrediting any form of opposition, in some southern Mexican states like Guerrero, Oaxaca, Michoacán, the unsatisfied population had to deal with police repression, kidnappings and death squads. This is the main reason why two of the most important guerrilla organizations of the late sixties appeared in the hills and jungle of Guerrero: the Partido de los Pobres (Party of the Poor, PdlP) and the Asociación Civíca Nacional Revolucionaria (National Revolutionary Civic Association, ACNR). The first one was led by Lucio Cabañas Barrientos while the latter was led by Genaro Vázquez Rojas, both of them with a background in rural elementary school teaching (maestros normalistas rurales). By the late sixties and early seventies, there were dozens of armed socialist groups in most of the states of the republic, each created by its own local conditions.

== Coordinadora Nacional Guerrillera and the Organización Partidaria ==
The first person to develop the idea of the unification of the armed organizations at the national level was Raúl Ramos Zavala, who since 1969, by means of texts such as "El Proceso Revolucionario en México, el tiempo que nos toco vivir" (The Revolutionary Process in Mexico, the Time We Live), criticized the Mexican Communist Party, considering that it had not been consistent with the political needs of the youth in the face of the 1968 movement, since no formal condemnation was made after the events of the bloody October 2 massacre. Moreover, he argued that socialism would not be achieved through a peaceful means or through collaborations with the State, which was the strategy that had been followed by the PCM, as instructed by the Comintern since the times of the Second World War. Ramos was at that time the national leader of the Juventudes Comunistas (Young Communists) and decided to break with them in 1969. His break with the PCM led many of the young party militants to leave alongside him and create their own political groups. Many of them became armed groups. Ramos Zalava, for his part, founded the group known as "Los Procesos" (the Processes) from which he sought to integrate the new groups that shared the need for a joint struggle. In one of his trips to his former college, the Autonomous University of Nuevo León, he met Ignacio Arturo Salas Obregón "Oseas" who was a student leader and, after abandoning the Movimiento Estudiantil Profesional (Professional Student Movement) which followed the lines of Liberation Theology, turned to communism and worked with Ramos in the merging project. With this new organization, briefly called Coordinadora Nacional Guerrillera (National Guerrilla Coordination), they sought to end ideological dispersion and begin joint actions with other organizations to provide "political education" to the Mexican proletariat in order to construct a revolutionary party and army. However, Ramos was assassinated in February 1972 in Mexico City during a police confrontation.

After the death of Ramos Zavala, Ignacio Arturo Salas Obregón founded the Organización Partidaria (Partisan Organization) in 1972, and wrote texts known as the Madera Viejos, (which are called Madera I, II, III and III-Bis), which developed Ramos Zavala's proposals on unification in a single organization at the national level, systematizing the political approaches that should begin to govern proletarian politics in Mexico. To this end, "Oseas" made an analysis of the conditions of the workers' struggle in Mexico, as well as the level of the existing relations of production, with the purpose of constructing a theory that would explain and sustain the actions of the organization to which they aspired. These documents were personally delivered by him to the various leaders of existing organizations in Mexico and a first National Meeting was convened on March 15, 1973 in Guadalajara, Jalisco for discussion and analysis. This first National Meeting lasted about 12 days. From this discussion arose the “Manifiesto al Proletariado: Questiones basicas del Movimiento Revolucionario, 1973” (Manifesto to the Proletariat: Basic Issues of the Revolutionary Movement, 1973). This document is better known as "Cuestiones" (Issues) and is the fundamental document of the League, where it theorizes about its actions, its political position, its strategy, among other things. With this document the ideological foundation for the September 23rd Communist League was set.

=== Founding organizations ===
The idea behind the concept of a communist "League" was to agglomerate all the armed socialist organizations that were active in Mexico. While it was successful in doing so with many small, newly formed and beaten out organizations, it wasn't able to convince bigger organizations like that of Lucio Cabañas, the Partido de los Pobres (PdlP). Some of the organizations (in no particular order) are the following:

- Los Lacandones: Formed from the remnants of the 1968's student movement in Mexico City. They first started acting as an armed organization during 1969, making "expropriations" in order to maintain their weapon supplies, as well as to pay for food and housing. After a series of successful assaults, six members of the organization were detained, on the 21 of February, 1972. By November of that year, most of the members of the armed group had been detained by the Dirección Federal de Seguridad (DFS). By February 1973, only three members were still free. After hearing of the unification proposal of Los Procesos, they joined the Organización Partidaria.
- Los Macias: With a Spartacist (Mexican Marxist school of thought created by Mexican poet José Revueltas, not to be confused with the German spartacist movement or the American Trotskyist organization) background, the organization was created in 1968. It was a splinter from the Movimiento Espartaquista Revolucinario, MER (Spartacist Revolutionary Movement) led by Mónico Rentería Medina and active in the state of Durango. After a few "expropriations", Rentería left the organization and the rest of the group, now led by Eduardo Medina Flores, decided to join the Organización Partidaria.
- Los Guajiros: Originally known as the Grupo N (N Group), conformed, mainly, by young people of northern origin (Baja California, Chihuahua, Durango, etc.) and started performing military actions in 1970. They were one of the first organizations to get in touch with other national groups (like the PdlP and the Procesos). They were named "Guajiros" by Lucio Cabañas. After a series of successful "expropriations", by 1972 the armed group suffered huge casualties, including that of their leader, Diego Lucero. The remnants of the organization joined the LC23S.
- Los Procesos: A splinter from the Juventudes Comunistas (Communist Youth), its main leader was Raúl Ramos Zavala, a student from the Universidad Autónoma de Nuevo León. It was the first group to come up with the idea of creating a "federation" of armed groups that would work in coordination throughout the country. Like the Guajiros, they had a series of successful "expropriation" actions, which later resulted in enormous casualties. Ramos Zavala was executed on February 6, 1972.
- Grupo 23 de Septiembre:
- Los Enfermos (The Sick Ones): The radical wing of the Autonomous University of Sinaloa’s Students Federation. Its aims and goals shifted from academic objectives to more broad, social issues.
- Los Vikingos (The Vikings): Sometimes described as a gang, los Vikingos was a group of young people from a neighborhood in Guadalajara who, through the influence of liberal politicians, socially conscious Catholic priests and communist sympathizers, got involved in social and university activism. They would join the LC23S and become one of their main suppliers of guns and ammo.
- Movimiento 23 de Septiembre:
- A splinter section of the Movimiento de Acción Revolucionaria, MAR (Revoluctionary Action Movement): Created in 1969 in Moscow, by students affiliated to the Mexican Communist Party. They got military and political education in North Korea. After being crushed by the security forces, a small splinter section would later join the LC23S.
- MAR-23 de Septiembre: Some of the surviving members of the MAR organization decided to separate from their main group, and join forces with the Movimiento 23 de Septiembre. They later joined the LC23S.
- A section of the Movimiento Estudiantil Profesional, MEP (the Professional Student Movement): A group of radical Catholic students who, at first, were active in different social causes and later became convinced that real change would only be achieved through revolutionary actions.
- A section of the Frente Estudiantil Revolucionario, FER (Student Revolutionary Front): First appeared in the Universidad de Guadalajara in 1972, as a response to the political violence that was taking place. It disputed the political control of the university with the Federación de Estudiantes de Guadalajara (Guadalajara's Students Union).

== History ==
Many researchers give the existence of the LC23S a timeline that goes from the early months of 1973 to later months of 1974. This first proposal is one of the mostly widely accepted and characterizes the LC23S for their proactive offensive strategy, where expropriations (bank robberies), police killings, propaganda distribution and clashes with the security services were common. It is also marked by the death of many of the top founding commanders, including their main leader, Ignacio Arturo Salas Obregón (a.k.a. Oseas). Others place 1976 as the final frontier of the organization, in an attempt to provide an alternative to the first timeline. This timeline places the end of the League after the failed kidnapping attempt of the sister of the Mexican president-elect, Margarita Lopez Portillo, and the death of Oseas successor, David Jiménez Sarmiento (El Chano). A third position says that its historical horizon reaches the year 1982 when Miguel Ángel Barraza García (a.k.a. El Piojo Negro, The Black Louse), the last national leader of the Liga, falls in combat and the last number of the newsletter Madera is published. This is due to the fact that even though, by 1976, casualties were high and the persecution by the Mexican government was at its strongest point, there was never a complete crackdown of the National Directive (Coordinadora Nacional). According to records by the Dirección Federal de Seguridad (DFS, Mexican secret police), as well as interviews with former members of the organization, by 1981 recruitment of new militants was still taking place throughout the country, especially at university campuses and rural teacher schools (Escuelas Normales). This last timeline is marked by a more defensive and reactive strategy than the more proactive and offensive one which they started with in 1973.

=== Formative and offensive stage (1972–1974) ===
On May 15, 1973, as part of a joint effort by several armed organizations in the country, the September 23rd Communist League was formed. It is the only guerrilla organization in Mexico, created in the seventies, which came to be considered as an actual internal threat to national stability, due in part to the large number of militants they had, as well as to the extent of the territory in which they had presence. Despite being made up of workers and peasants, the largest part of its members belonged to the student sector. Their short term objective was divided in two: First, the formation of a national union of armed organizations, which should work around the ideological and political ideas that National Directive established. The second part, once the homogenization process was completed, consisted of the creation of a vanguard party (in accordance with Leninist theory), which should be strong enough to guide the workers and peasants through the revolutionary process. In this sense, the LC23S never considered itself a full fledged party, but a transitional step towards it. Several groups, from different places and with different backgrounds, decided to join the project: Los Lacandones; Los Macias; Los Guajiros; Los Procesos, part of the Student Revolutionary Front (Frente Estudiantil Revolucionario, FER) of Guadalajara; the radical wing of the Autonomous University of Sinaloa's Students Federation, known as Los Enfermos (the sick ones); MAR-23; the Professional Student Movement (Movimiento Estudiantil Profesional, MEP); Grupo 23 de Septiembre; as well as several small groups without previous partisan organization or militancy. Through prints, pamphlets and the distribution of its own publication, Madera, periódico clandestino, they intended to make visible their political program, as well as to recruit new members. The organization was present in at least twenty of the thirty-two states that form the United Mexican States. It was during this period, on September 17 1973 that LC23S murdered Monterrey businessman Eugenio Garza Sada in a failed kidnapping attempt. This event further prompted President Luis Echeverría to intensfify its crackdown of the organization.

=== Defensive stage (1974–1976) ===
Even before the death of Ignacio Arturo Salas Obregón, the internal divisions within the League had started to show. After the disappearance of their main leader following a shootout on April 25, 1974, the process of polarization and division within the LC23S exacerbated, leading to accusations of infiltration, treason, revisionism, bourgeois opportunism, militarism, etc. The accusations escalated to a point where executions of supposed police infiltrators were carried out. Many of the militants separated themselves from the organization and continued working either within the legal political system or through new armed organizations. David Jimenez Sarmiento picked up the leadership of the organization during this time.

This stage is marked by a more militaristic approach, which left the political activity on a secondary plane. It ended with the failed kidnapping attempt of the sister of the Mexican president-elect, Margarita Lopez Portillo, on August 11, 1976. The purpose of this action was to gain leverage, catch public attention and request the liberation of political prisoners. The failed kidnapping attempt provoked many casualties, including Sarmiento, and left the leadership of the organization in the hands of the editorial committee of the Madera newsletter.

=== Survival stage (1976–1979) ===
After the death of David Jimenez Sarmiento, the increased violence put forward by the security forces, and the changing political landscape, the LC23S went through a restructuring and self-criticism process. During this time, their military activities diminished, focusing mainly on political actions and propaganda distribution. Great numbers of the newsletter Madera were distributed around the country. The main leader of the organization during the first half of this stage (1976–1979) was Luis Miguel Corral García, El Piojo Blanco (The White Louse).

During this time, the government, in a joint effort by the DFS, Departamento de Investigaciones Politicas y Sociales (DGIPS, Political and Social Investigations Department), the army and Mexico City's police, created the Brigada Especial (Especial Brigade) or Brigada Blanca (White Brigade) as was known by the population. Created June 7, 1976, under the project Plan de Aniquilamiento de la Liga Comunista 23 de Septiembre (Plan of Annihilation of the Communist League September 23) the BE worked essentially as a paramilitary organization. Its main objective was to physically and politically destroy the League and, in order to do so, it came up with two strategies: The Campaña de orientación al público contra la Liga Comunista 23 de Septiembre (Public orientation campaign against the Communist League September 23) and the Plan de Operaciones No.1 Rastreo (Operations Plan No. 1. Tracking). The first one consisted of psychological warfare, while the latter one was in political violence.

=== Extinction stage (1979–1982) ===
While on the one hand the LC23S was suffering casualties thanks to the BE, on the other side, the Political Reform (Ley Federal de Organizaciones Políticas y Procesos Electorales, LFOPPE) of 1977 was the final blow to the organization. Said law opened a small political space to the opposition, as well as permitted once again the legal participation of the Mexican Communist Party in national and local elections. This, effectively, destroyed the foundation on which the League had built its militancy: the lack of democracy and political competition in Mexico. During this time Miguel Ángel Barraza García (El Piojo Negro) was the main leader. Although the political and military activity (propaganda distribution and “expropriations”) were still taking place, they were in a much smaller size than years before. This did not mean a diminishing in the activities of the Especial Brigade, who intensified their annihilation strategy. The Especial Brigade had started an infiltration strategy, which consisted of getting jobs at factories and waiting for members of the LC23S to go there and hand out propaganda. At that point, the BE would start shooting at the brigade, without any attempts to make an arrest. On January 24, 1981, near Ciudad Universitaria (Universidad Nacional Autonoma de México), Barraza was killed, leaving the National Directive directionless. The last issue of Madera was published later that year. Without its main leader, the LC23S slowly dismantled, with some of its members joining the legal activism, while others remained clandestine.

== Members ==
- Mario Álvarez Cartagena (died July 2021)

== Aftermath ==
On September 23, 2019, speaking on behalf of the Presidency of Andrés Manuel López Obrador, Interior Secretary Olga Sánchez Cordero apologized to Martha Camacho Loaiza, the wife of a leader of the Liga Comunista 23 de septiembre, who was tortured in 1977. The apology took place in the Centro Cultural Tlatelolco, scene of the October 2, 1968 student massacre. This followed a previous investigation by the Presidency of Vicente Fox which ended in charges of genocide against former president Luis Echeverría being dropped.

== Popular culture ==
- In Alejandro González Iñárritu's 2000 film Amores perros, the guerrilla is indirectly mentioned as 'El Chivo' (portrayed by Emilio Echevarría) was a guerrilla fighter.

== See also ==
- Mexican Dirty War
- Zapatista Army of National Liberation
- Party of the Poor
- People's Guerrilla Group
- People's Revolutionary Army
- Dirección Federal de Seguridad
