= XHAYA-FM =

Radio station in Atoyac de Álvarez, Guerrero

Atoyac de Álvarez, Guerrero; Mexico
- Frequency: 100.9 MHz
- Branding: La 100.9

Ownership
- Owner: Corporativa de Comunicación de Guerrero, S.A. de C.V.

History
- First air date: June 18, 1991 (concession)
- Last air date: 2018
- Call sign meaning: "Atoyac"

Technical information
- Class: B
- ERP: 29.34 kW
- HAAT: 260 m
- Transmitter coordinates: 17°14′01.6″N 100°25′8.2″W

XHAYA-FM was a radio station on 100.9 FM in Atoyac de Álvarez, Guerrero. It is owned by Corporativa de Comunicación de Guerrero, S.A. de C.V. and broadcast between 1991 and 2018. It was last known as La 100.9.

== History ==
XHAYA received its concession on June 18, 1991. It was owned by Francisco Alejandro Wong and was transferred to its current concessionaire, of which Wong owns 30 percent, in 2004. Long known as Estéreo Sol, it relaunched as La 100.9 in 2018, but the station closed down at the end of the year. The station's concession expired on June 17, 2018, and was not renewed.
