= Lucio Cabañas =

Mexican social leader

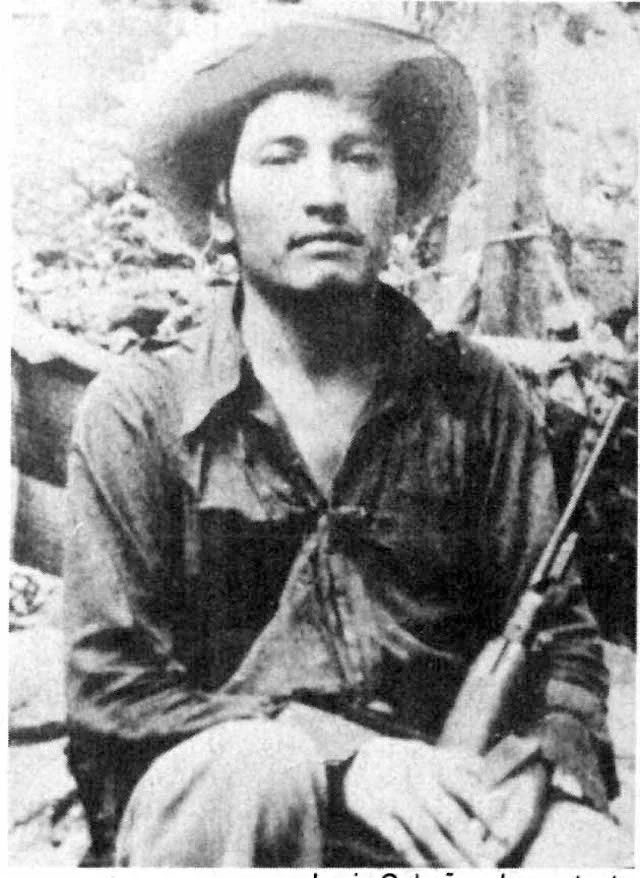
- Cabañas as a guerrilla leader
- Born: Lucio Cabañas Barrientos; 12 December 1938; El Porvenir, Atoyac de Álvarez, Guerrero, Mexico
- Died: 2 December 1974 (aged 35); Tecpan de Galeana, Guerrero, Mexico
- Organization: Party of the Poor

Lucio Cabañas Barrientos (Latin American Spanish: [ˈlusjo kaˈβaɲas βaˈrjentos]; December 12, 1938 – December 2, 1974) was a Mexican social leader, schoolteacher, union leader, and guerrilla leader who founded the social and political movement Party of the Poor in 1967. Under his leadership, the party later became a guerrilla organization that was active in the Sierra Madre del Sur mountain range of Guerrero.

== Early life ==
Lucio was born on December 12, 1938, into a peasant household. His paternal grandfather had been a Zapatista and his uncle Pablo, had participated in the Vidales brothers' guerrilla in the 1920s. He completed his basic education in the town of El Cayaco. Later in February 1956, he entered the Ayotzinapa Rural Normal School.

== Teacher ==
He was born in El Porvenir, of Atoyac de Álvarez, in the state of Guerrero. He became politically active when he studied at the Ayotzinapa Rural Normal School and was a leader of the local student union. In 1962, he was elected to the post of General Secretary of the Federation of Socialistic Peasant Students of Mexico. When he began work as a teacher, he also mediated problems at other schools.

== Revolutionary ==
When a rector of Juan Álvarez school in Atoyac demanded that all pupils wear school uniforms, Cabañas argued that some families were so poor they could hardly feed their children, let alone buy school uniforms. The rector was fired, but his supporters remained. When a strike on 18 May 1967, ended in shooting and deaths, Cabañas fled to the mountains and joined the group of Genaro Vázquez Rojas until Vázquez' death on 2 February 1972.

Cabañas led a guerrilla group, the Party of the Poor (PDLP) and Peasants' Brigade Against Injustice (PDLP-BCA). They numbered perhaps 300 members and lived in the Guerrero Mountains. He financed his group through kidnappings and bank robberies.

The Mexican government sent 16,000 soldiers to the Sierra Madre de Atoyac Mountains to hunt him. Fifty of them died during the chase.

== Death ==
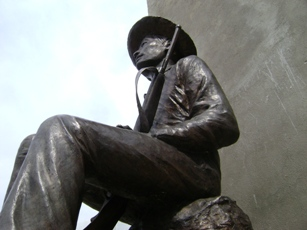
Statue of Lucio Cabañas in Atoyac

On May 20, 1974, the PDLP kidnapped Rubén Figueroa Figueroa, senator and close friend to President Luis Echeverría, and presented the government with a list of demands. The Mexican government refused to negotiate with the guerrillas and instead increased their attempt to eliminate the guerrilla group. The military recovered Figueroa in September, but continued their increased attacks against the guerrillas. The kidnapping marked the beginning of the end for Cabañas and the PDLP.

According to the Mexican government, Cabañas and three other guerrillas were found in El Otatal, Tecpan de Galeana, and were killed in combat on December 2, 1974. Newer information contends that Cabañas killed himself to avoid capture or was executed by the Mexican military.

== Legacy ==
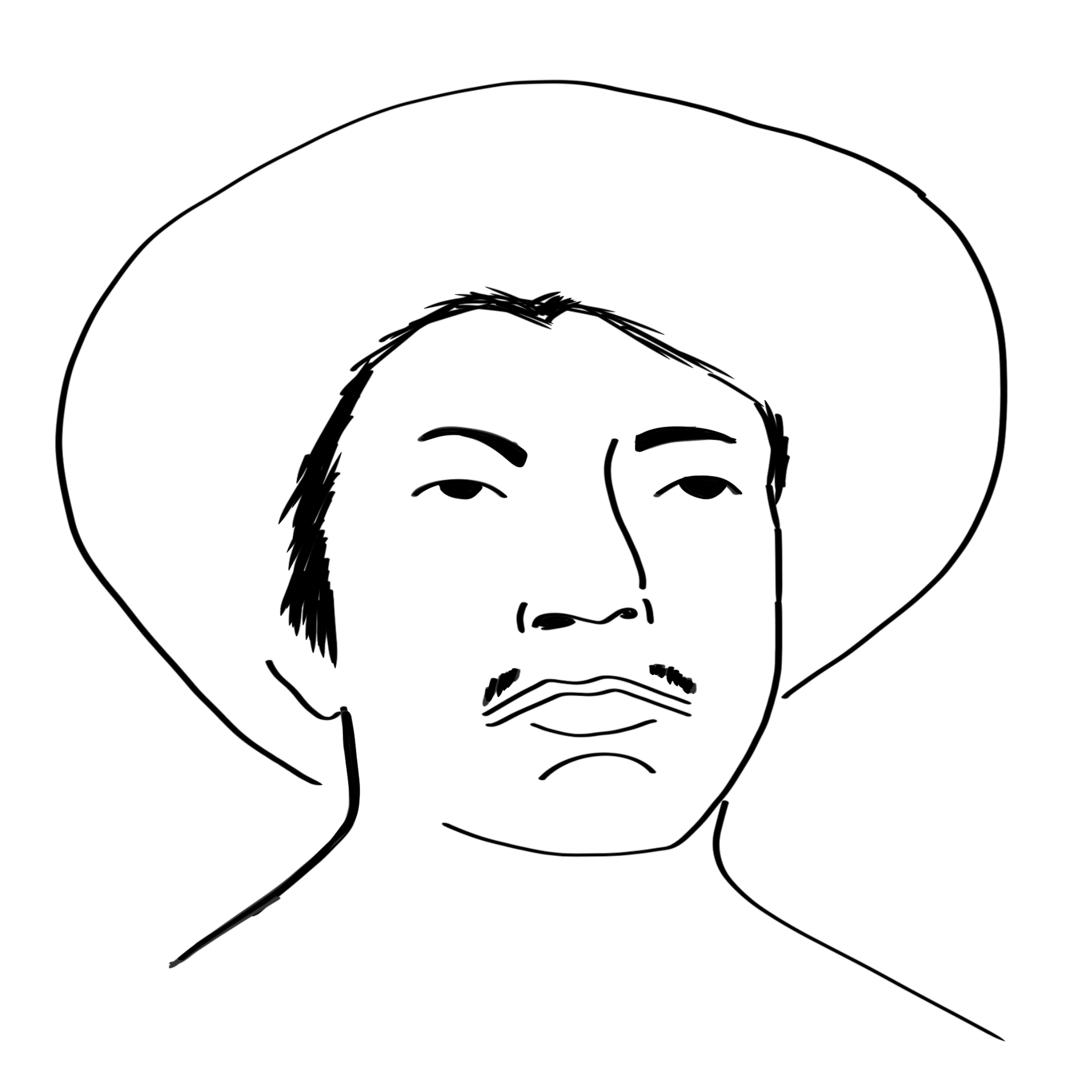
Stylized portrait of Cabañas

There are a number of legends about Cabañas, including that he had five women bodyguards and carried a bag full of money that he distributed to the poor. Those are most likely "tall tales"; similar legends have been built around Pancho Villa and Emiliano Zapata.

In recent years, Cabañas has become a left-wing icon in Mexico, much like Che Guevara and Subcomandante Marcos. During recent social movements, including the 2006 clashes between teachers and the state government of Oaxaca, his face appeared on banners alongside those of Guevara and Vladimir Lenin.

== In popular culture ==
The writer Carlos Montemayor recounts the history of the Party of the Poor and the life of Cabañs as a guerrilla in his 1990 book Guerra en el Paraíso (War in Paradise). The book El guerrillero by Camarada Ernesto refers to Lucio Cabañas, the PDLP and the sierra.See the documentary La Guerrilla y la Esperanza: Lucio Cabañas (La Rabia Films, 2005).

Guerrilla groups such as the Revolutionary Democratic People's Army, Revolutionary Army of the Insurgent People and the Popular Revolutionary Army that operated in the state of Guerrero reflected as a direct influence the methodology and outreach to indigenous communities.

== Murder of his widow ==
On 3 July 2011, it was reported that the widow of Cabañas, Isabel Ayala Nava, was assassinated, along with her sister, as the two women exited a church in Xaltianguis, Guerrero. The killers fired from a vehicle; one then got down and stole the cell phones from the victims. Isabel Ayala had recently been demanding justice over the killing of her husband.

== See also ==
- Liga Comunista 23 de Septiembre

== Bibliography ==
- Ulloa Bornemann, Alberto. Surviving Mexico's Dirty War: A Political Prisoner's Memoir. trans. Aurora Camacho de Schmidt and Arthur Schmidt. Philadelphia: Temple University Press, 2007. ISBN 1-59213-423-8
