= Luis Echeverría =

President of Mexico from 1970 to 1976

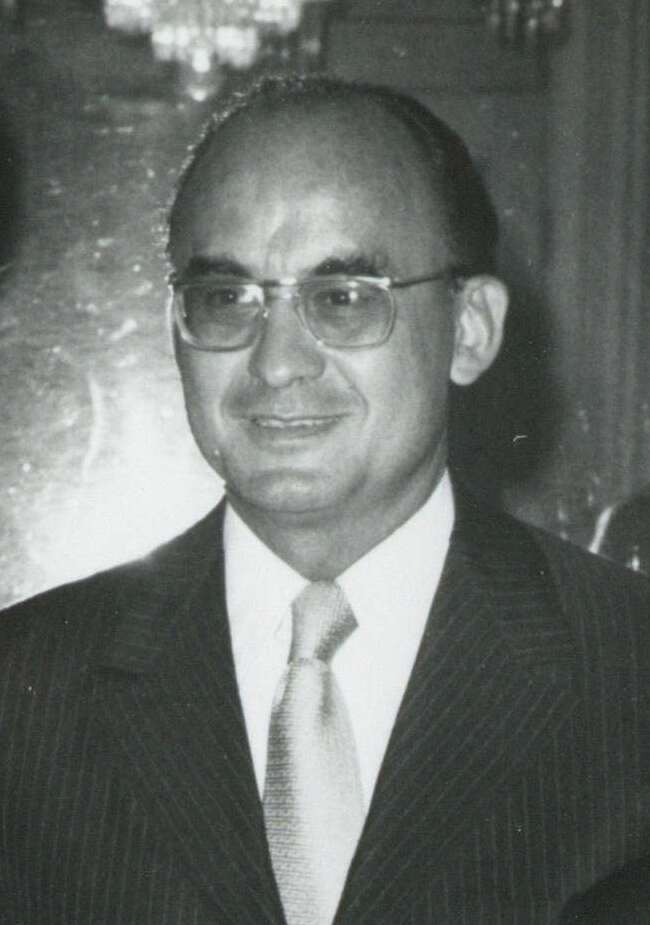
- Echeverría, c. 1970-1976

57th President of Mexico
- In office 1 December 1970 – 30 November 1976
- Preceded by: Gustavo Díaz Ordaz
- Succeeded by: José López Portillo

Secretary of the Interior of Mexico
- In office 16 November 1963 – 11 November 1969
- President: Adolfo López Mateos; Gustavo Díaz Ordaz
- Preceded by: Gustavo Díaz Ordaz
- Succeeded by: Mario Moya Palencia

Personal details
- Born: Luis Echeverría Álvarez; 17 January 1922 Mexico City, Mexico
- Died: 8 July 2022 (aged 100) Cuernavaca, Morelos, Mexico
- Party: Institutional Revolutionary
- Height: 5 ft 7 in (1.70 m)
- Spouse: María Esther Zuno (m. 1945; died 1999)
- Children: 8
- Relatives: Rodolfo Landa (brother); Rodolfo Echeverría Ruiz (nephew); Rosa Luz Alegría (daughter-in-law)
- Education: National Autonomous University of Mexico (LLB)

Luis Echeverría Álvarez (Spanish pronunciation: [ˈlwis etʃeβeˈri.a ˈalβaɾes]; 17 January 1922 – 8 July 2022) was a Mexican lawyer, academic, and politician affiliated with the Institutional Revolutionary Party (PRI) who served as the 57th president of Mexico from 1970 to 1976. Previously, Echeverría was Secretary of the Interior from 1963 to 1969. He was the longest-lived president in Mexican history and the first to reach the age of 100.

Echeverría was a long-time CIA asset, known by the cryptonym, LITEMPO-8. His tenure as Secretary of the Interior during the Díaz Ordaz administration was marked by an increase in political repression. Dissident journalists, politicians, and activists were subjected to censorship, arbitrary arrests, torture, and extrajudicial killings. This culminated with the Tlatelolco massacre of 2 October 1968, which ruptured the Mexican student movement; Díaz Ordaz, Echeverría, and Secretary of Defense Marcelino Garcia Barragán have been considered as the intellectual authors of the massacre, in which hundreds of unarmed protestors were killed by the Mexican Army. The following year, Díaz Ordaz appointed Echeverría as his designated successor to the presidency, and he won in the 1970 general election.

Echeverría was one of the most high-profile presidents in Mexico's post-war history; he attempted to become a leader of the Third World, countries unaligned with the United States or the Soviet Union during the Cold War. He offered political asylum to Hortensia Bussi and other refugees of Augusto Pinochet's dictatorship in Chile, established diplomatic relations and a close collaboration with the People's Republic of China after visiting Beijing and meeting with Chairman Mao Zedong and Premier Zhou Enlai, and tried to use Mao's influence among Asian and African nations in an ultimately failed attempt to become Secretary-General of the United Nations. Echeverría strained relations with Israel after supporting a UN resolution that condemned Zionism.

Domestically, Echeverría led the country during a period of significant economic growth, with the Mexican economy aided by high oil prices, and growing at a yearly rate of 6.1%. He aggressively promoted the development of infrastructure projects such as new maritime ports in Lázaro Cárdenas and Ciudad Madero. His presidency was also characterized by authoritarian methods including death flights, the 1971 Corpus Christi massacre against student protesters, the Dirty War against leftist dissent in the country (despite Echeverría adopting a left-populist rhetoric), and a financial crisis that started near the end of his term (partly as result of overspending during his administration) which led to a devaluation of the peso. In 2006, he was indicted and ordered under house arrest for his role in the Tlatelolco and Corpus Christi massacres, but the charges against him were dismissed in 2009.

Echeverría is one of the most controversial presidents in the history of Mexico. Supporters have praised his populist policies such as a more enthusiastic application of land redistribution than his predecessor Díaz Ordaz, expansion of social security, the creation of the INFONAVIT, his intense diplomatic activity and Mexico's presence at the international stage during his administration, and instigating Mexico's first environmental protection laws. Detractors have criticized institutional violence such as the Dirty War and Corpus Christi massacre, and his administration's economic mismanagement and response to the financial crisis of 1976, as well as his constant conflicts with the private sector. His suspected role in the Tlatelolco Massacre prior to his presidency has also damaged his reputation.

Shortly after his presidential term ended, Echeverría was a candidate for the position of Secretary General of the United Nations in the 1976 UN election, being defeated by incumbent Kurt Waldheim from Austria. So far, Echeverría has been the last Mexican to have contended for the UN Secretary-Generalship.

== Early life ==
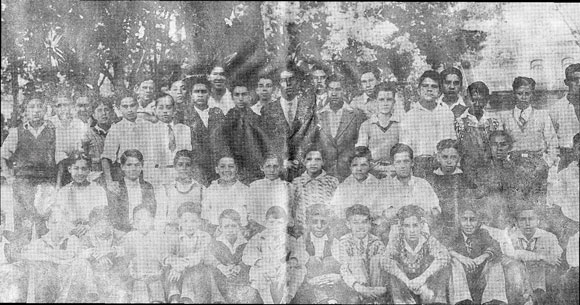
Echeverría (third row, fifth from left) with his 6th grade class, c.1933

Luis Echeverría Álvarez was born on 17 January 1922 in Mexico City to Rodolfo Echeverría Esparza and Catalina Álvarez Gayou. His paternal grandfather was Francisco de Paula Echeverría y Dorantes, a military doctor. He was the brother of actor Rodolfo Landa. He was of Basque descent. One of his childhood friends was José López Portillo, who would eventually succeed him as president of Mexico.

Echeverría met María Esther Zuno at the home of the artists Diego Rivera and Frida Kahlo, with whom they were friends. The couple's social circle also included the artists David Alfaro Siqueiros and José Clemente Orozco. After a five-year engagement, Zuno and Echeverría, a law student at the time, were married on 2 January 1945. José López Portillo served as their witness.

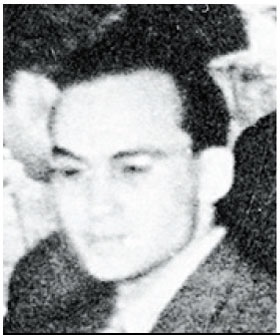
Echeverría early in his political career, c.1940s-1950s

Echeverría studied law at the National Autonomous University of Mexico, and obtained his degree in 1945. Echeverría joined the university's faculty in 1947 and taught political theory and constitutional law.

== Early political career ==
=== Early PRI positions ===
Echeverría joined the Institutional Revolutionary Party (PRI) in 1944. He eventually became the private secretary of the party president, Rodolfo Sánchez Taboada, which allowed him to rise in the hierarchy of the party and acquire his first political offices.

=== Secretary of the Interior ===
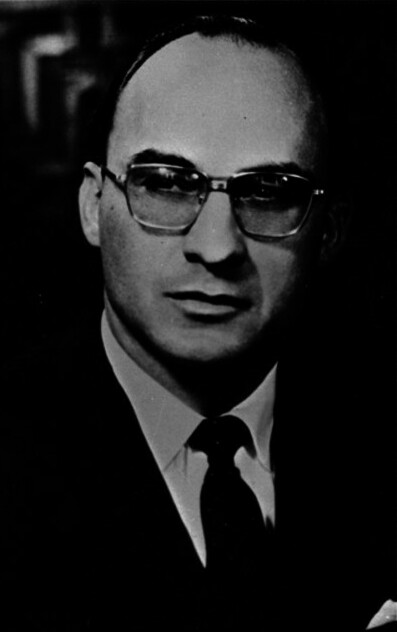
Echeverría as Secretary of the Interior in 1965

Echeverría was Deputy Secretary of the Interior during Adolfo López Mateos's presidency, with Gustavo Díaz Ordaz as Secretary of the Interior. After Díaz Ordaz left the Secretariat in November 1963 to become the presidential candidate of the PRI for the 1964 elections, Echeverría was appointed Secretary of the Interior to serve during the remainder of the López Mateos administration. Once Díaz Ordaz took office as president, he confirmed Echeverría as Secretary of the Interior, where he remained until November 1969. He was one of four ministers retained by Díaz Ordaz from López Mateos' cabinet.

==== Tlatelolco ====
Known as the "assassin of Tlatelolco" in student circles, Echeverría maintained a hard line against student protesters throughout 1968. Clashes between the government and protesters culminated in the Tlatelolco massacre in October 1968, a few days before the 1968 Summer Olympics were held in Mexico City. To combat this, Echeverría worked to portray himself as a reformer, and sometimes even a revolutionary, in order to win approval back of students. As U.S. officials wrote, Echeverría urged "a posture of conscious rebellion" as part of a "concentrated effort" to capture youth discontent.

=== 1970 presidential succession and campaign ===
On 22 October 1969, Díaz Ordaz summoned Alfonso Martínez Domínguez—the PRI party president—and other party leaders to his office in Los Pinos to reveal Echeverría as his successor. Martínez Domínguez asked the president if he was sure of his decision and Díaz Ordaz replied, "Why do you ask? It's the most important decision of my life and I've thought it over well." On 8 November 1969, Echeverría was officially announced as the presidential candidate of the PRI. Although Echeverría was a hardliner in Díaz Ordaz's administration and considered responsible for the Tlatelolco massacre, he became "immediately obsessed with making people forget that he had ever done it."

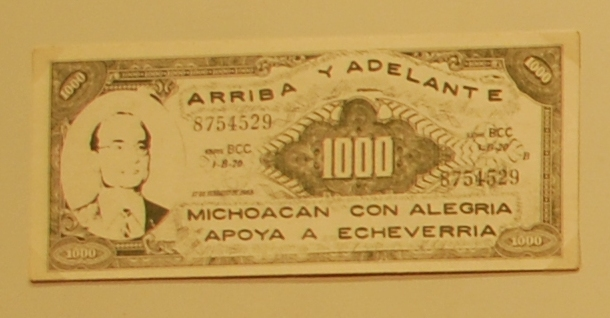
A contribution bond for the Echeverría campaign.

During his campaign, Echeverría adopted populist rhetoric, personally campaigning in over 850 municipalities, and is believed to have been seen by around 10 million people of Mexico's then-population of 48 million. He avoided criticizing Díaz Ordaz's administration, and barely mentioned his main opponent, the PAN's Efraín González Morfín. He also stated that his government would avoid attempting to curb Mexico's population growth, which was expected to double in the coming decade, stating it was a personal matter, not the state's. In 1969, he defined his position as "neither to the right, nor to the left, nor in a static center, but onward and upward."

In defining his ideological stance, various observers have described Echeverría as left-leaning, leftist or left-wing.

Echeverría won the election with over 80% of the popular vote, as was entirely expected by international observers.

== Presidency (1970–1976) ==
=== Inauguration ===
Echeverría assumed the presidency on 1 December 1970.

=== Domestic policy ===
Echeverría was the first president born after the Mexican Revolution. Once inaugurated as president, he embarked on a massive program of populist political and economic reform, nationalizing the mining and electrical industries, redistributing private land in the states of Sinaloa and Sonora to peasants, imposing limits on foreign investment, and extending Mexico's maritime Economic Exclusion Zone to 200 nautical miles (370 km). Various social initiatives were undertaken, with state spending on health, housing construction, education, and food subsidies significantly increased, and the percentage of the population covered by the social security system doubled. Government spending almost quadrupled between 1971 and 1975 under Echeverría's left-wing government, while public spending rose from 22% to 32% of GDP during his presidency.

Shortly after his term began, he issued an amnesty to all those arrested during the 1968 protests, which is believed to have been an attempt to disassociate himself with the massacre. The last 20 prisoners from the protests were released on 20 December 1971. He enraged the left because he did not bring the perpetrators of the 1971 Corpus Christi massacre to justice.

On 8 October 1974, Echeverría issued a decree creating the new states of Baja California Sur and Quintana Roo, which had previously been federal territories.

==== Economic issues ====
After decades of economic growth under his predecessors, the Echeverría administration oversaw an economic crisis during its final months, becoming the first in a series of governments that faced severe economic crises over the ensuing two decades.

During his period in office, the country's external debt soared from US$6 billion in 1970 to US$20 billion in 1976. By 1976, for every dollar that Mexico received from exports, 31 cents had to be allocated to the payment of interest and amortizations on the external debt.

The balance of services, which traditionally had registered surpluses and had been used to partly finance the negative trade balance, entered into deficit for the first time in 1975 and 1976.

Despite this, the Mexican economy grew by 6.1%, and important infrastructure and public works projects were completed after stalling for decades.

Echeverría nationalized the barbasco industry during his tenure. Wild barbasco was the natural source of hormones that were the key component in the contraceptive pill. Nationalization and the creation of the state-run company PROQUIVEMEX came as the importance of Mexico to the industry was waning.

==== Changes in the electoral system ====
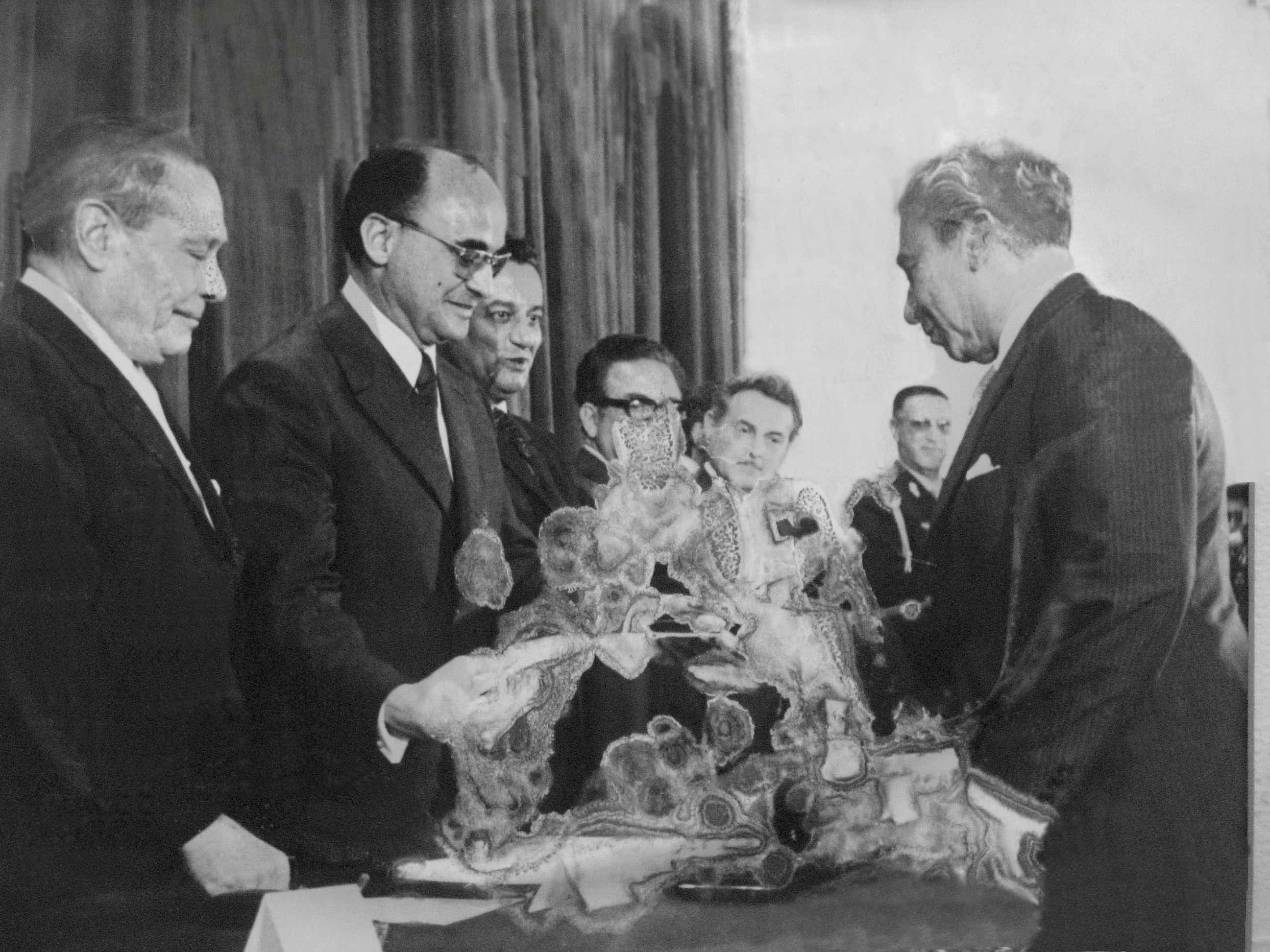
Echeverría with engineer Oscar Vega Argüelles.

During Echeverría's administration, a new Federal Election Law was approved which lowered the number of members a party needed to become officially registered from 75,000 to 65,000, introduced a permanent voting card, and established the minimum age for candidacy for elected office at 21 (down from the previous age of 30).

Following PRI tradition, Echeverría handpicked his successor for the Presidency, and chose his Finance Minister and childhood friend, José López Portillo, to be the PRI's presidential candidate for the 1976 elections. Due to a series of events and an internal conflict in the opposition party PAN, López Portillo was the only candidate in the Presidential election, which he won unopposed.

==== Environmental policy ====
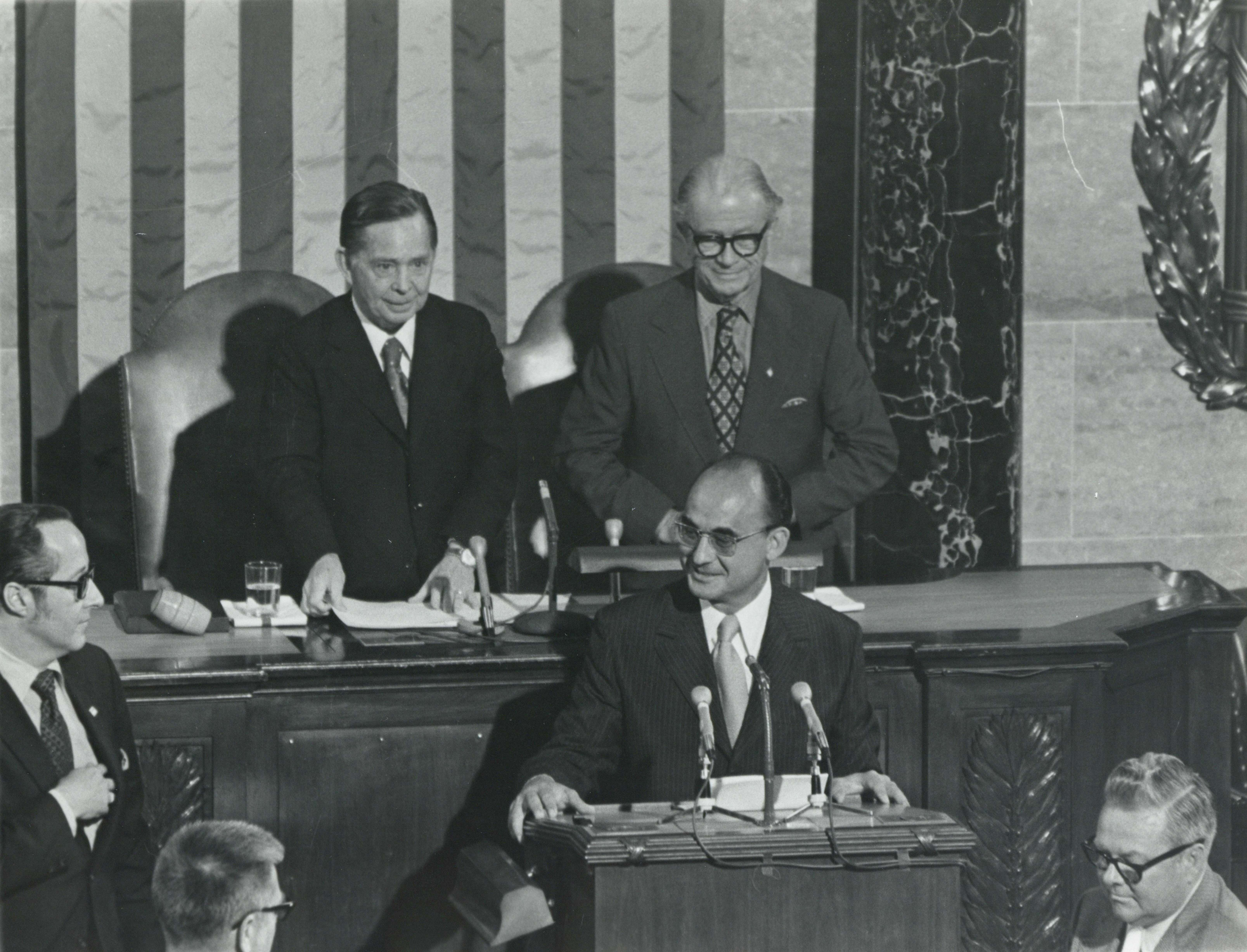
Echeverría addresses the U.S. Congress

The Echeverría government adopted the first national environmental law in 1971. Attention on the environmental impacts came from academics at the National Autonomous University, the National Polytechnic Institute, and the Colegio de México as well as interest in the 1969 U.S. National Environmental Policy Act. The government enacted a series of regulations to control atmospheric pollution, as well as issuing new quality standards for surface and coastal waters. As a structural matter, the government created a new agency to deal with the environment, which in later administrations became a full cabinet-level ministry.

==== Dirty War and political violence ====
The Echeverría administration was characterized by growing political violence:

- On one hand, several leftist guerrilla groups appeared throughout the country (the most important being those led by Lucio Cabañas and Genaro Vázquez in Guerrero, as well as the urban guerrilla Liga Comunista 23 de Septiembre) in response to the government's authoritarianism and increasing social inequalities. The activities of these guerrilla groups mostly comprised kidnappings of prominent politicians and businessmen (two of the most famous cases included the kidnapping of José Guadalupe Zuno, who was Echeverría's father-in-law, and the failed kidnapping attempt of Eugenio Garza Sada, which ended in his death), bank robberies and occasional attacks on garrisons.
- And on the other hand, the Government itself violently repressed political dissent. In addition to the notorious 1971 Corpus Christi massacre, the Army was accused of widespread human rights violations (including executions) during the fight against the guerrilla groups. The aforementioned guerrilla leaders Cabañas and Vázquez, both of whom officially died in clashes with the army, are widely suspected of actually having been extrajudicially executed by the armed forces.

In addition to those taken by the Federal government, State Governors (all of whom belonged to the PRI) also undertook repressive measures of their own. One of the most notorious cases was that of Gonzalo Bautista O'Farrill, Governor of the State of Puebla; during his short tenure as Governor, many leftist student leaders and activists from the Autonomous University of Puebla were assassinated. President Echeverría asked Bautista O'Farrill to resign after the latter ordered the State Police to take the Carolino building of the Autonomous University of Puebla by force on 1 May 1973, leaving at least three dead.

==== Ban on rock music ====
As a consequence of numerous student and youth protest movements during his administration, President Echeverría attempted to neutralize politicized youth. In late 1971, after the Corpus Christi massacre and the Avándaro Rock Festival, Echeverría famously issued a ban on almost every form of rock music recorded by Mexican bands. The ban (also known as "Avandarazo" because it was in response to the Avándaro Rock Festival, which had been criticized by the conservative sectors of the PRI) included forbidding the recording of most forms of rock music by national groups and the prohibition of its sales in retail stores, as well as forbidding live rock concerts and the airplay of rock songs. International rock music was initially not as affected by this ban, but after a 1975 concert at the Auditorio Nacional in Mexico City by the band Chicago ended with turbulence (due to oversold tickets) and police repression, president Echeverría issued a temporary ban on all concerts by American musicians in Mexico. The ban on domestic rock music lasted for many years, and it only began to be gradually lifted in the 1980s.

=== Foreign policy ===
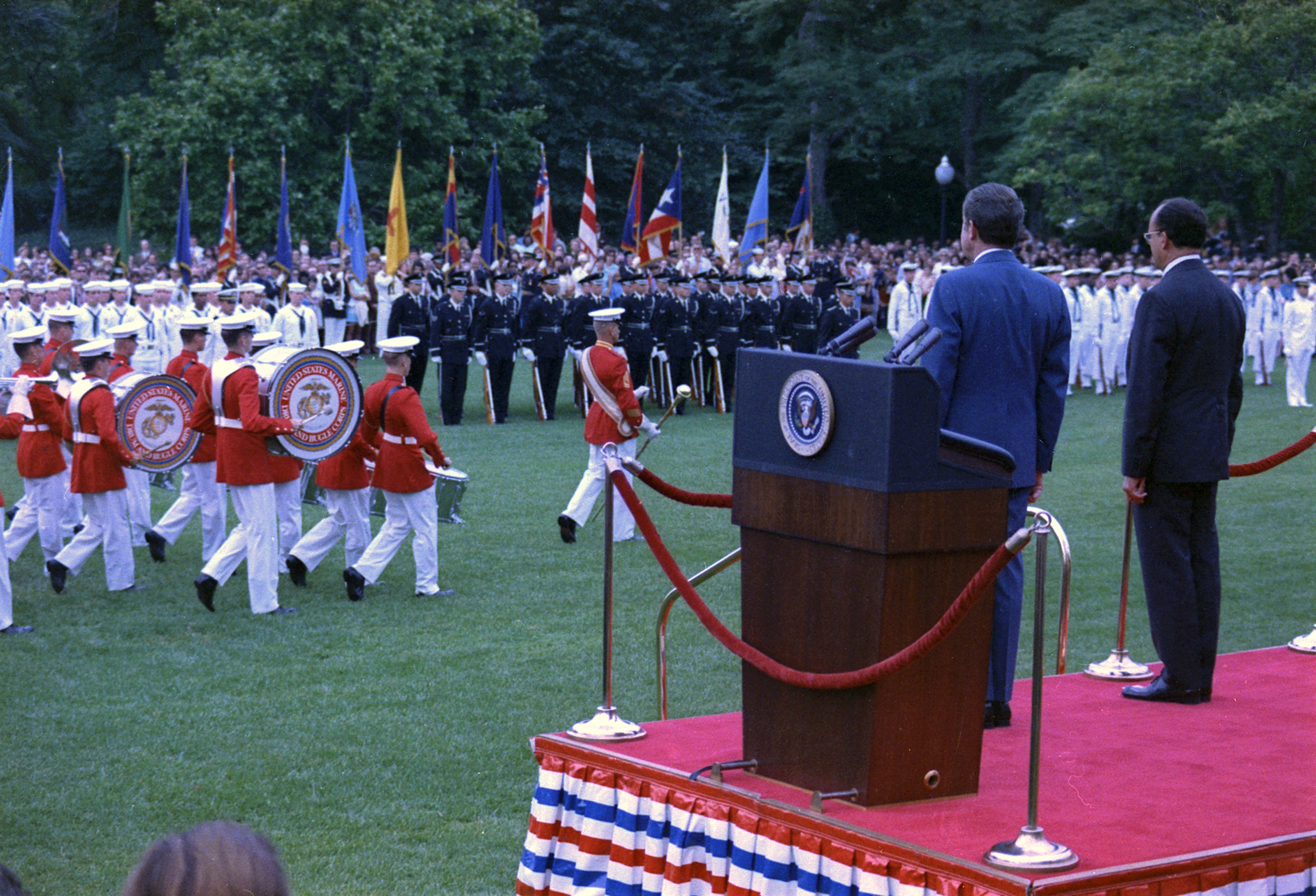
U.S. President Richard Nixon (left) and Luis Echeverría reviewing US troops (1972)

Under the banner of tercermundismo ("Third Worldism"), a reorientation took place in Mexican foreign policy during Echeverría's presidential term. He showed his solidarity with the developing nations and tried to establish Mexico as the defender of Third World interests. The aims of Echeverría's foreign policy were to diversify Mexico's economic links and to fight for a more equal and just international order.

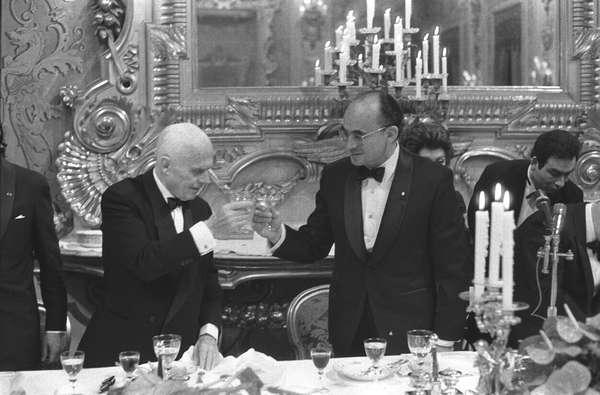
Echeverría with Italian president Sandro Pertini during his visit to Rome in 1974.

He had strong ties with the communist and socialist governments of Cuba and Chile respectively. Echeverría visited Cuba in 1975. Also, Mexico provided political asylum to many political refugees from South American countries who fled their country's repressive military dictatorships; among them Hortensia Bussi, the widow of former Chilean President Salvador Allende. Moreover, he condemned Zionism and allowed the Palestine Liberation Organization to open an office in the capital.

Echeverría used his position as president to promote the Declaration of Mexico on the Equality of Women and Their Contribution to Development and Peace, which was adopted by the 1975 World Conference on Women held in Mexico City. Also in 1975, the Mexican delegation to the United Nations voted in favour of General Assembly Resolution 3379, which equated Zionism with South Africa's apartheid and condemned it as a form of racial discrimination. This resulted in a tourism boycott by the U.S. Jewish community against Mexico, which made visible internal and external conflicts of Echeverría's politics.

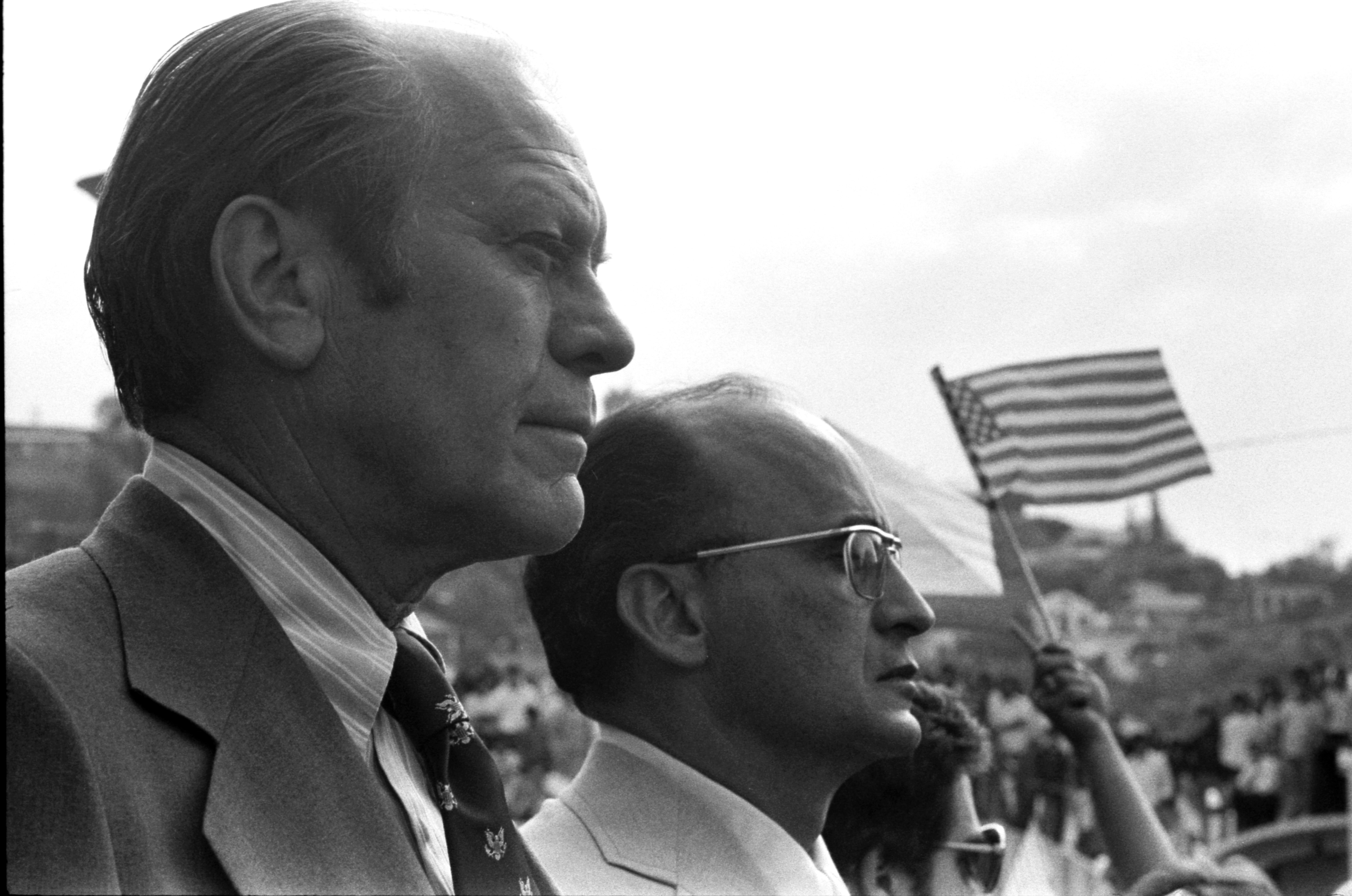
Echeverría with US president Gerald Ford during his visit to Washington D.C. in 1975.

Echeverría's presidency rode a wave of anger by citizens in Northwestern Mexico against the United States for its use (and perceived misappropriation) of water from the Colorado River, which drains much of the American Southwest before crossing into Mexico. The established treaty between the U.S. and Mexico called for the U.S. to allow a specified volume of water, 1.85 cubic kilometres (0.44 mi^{3}), to pass the U.S.-Mexican border, but it did not establish any quality levels. Throughout the 20th century, the United States, through its water policy managed by the United States Bureau of Reclamation, had developed wide-ranging irrigation along the river, which had led to progressively higher levels of salinity in the water as it moved downstream. By the late 1960s, the high salinity of the water crossing into Mexico had resulted in the ruin of large tracts of the irrigated land along the lower Colorado.

==== Official international trips ====
Echeverría visited a total of 36 countries. This is a list of official trips abroad made by him during his presidency.

According to Article 88 of the Constitution of Mexico, the president may leave the country for up to seven days by informing the Senate or, where applicable, the Permanent Commission in advance of the reasons for the absence, as well as of the results of the measures carried out. For absences longer than seven days, permission from the Senate or the Permanent Commission is required.

Date	Destination	Main purpose
1970
No official foreign visits
1971
8 May	Tecún Umán (Guatemala)	Working meeting.
1972 (Note: The tour of Japan included an initial one-day stopover in Honolulu on 8 March and a second stopover on the return to Mexico on 15 March. There were no official activities during either stopover.)
9–14 March	Tokyo, Osaka, Kyoto, Nara, Kimitsu and Yokohama (Japan)	State visit. Meetings with Prime Minister Eisaku Satō, Emperor Hirohito, and Crown Prince Akihito.
16 April	Lima (Peru)	State visit.
17–21 April	Santiago (Chile)	State visit and participation in the United Nations Conference on Trade and Development.
14–17 June	Washington, D.C., Key Biscayne, New York, Chicago and San Antonio (United States)	State visit. Addressed the United States Congress.
1973 (Note: The European tour included a one-day stopover in Manchester on 3 April. There were no official activities during the stopover.)
29 March – 2 April	Ottawa (Canada)	State visit. Meeting with Governor General Roland Michener and Prime Minister Pierre Trudeau. Promoted the Charter of Economic Rights and Duties of States.
3–6 April	London (United Kingdom)	State visit. Meeting with Queen Elizabeth II and Prime Minister Edward Heath. Promoted the Charter of Economic Rights and Duties of States.
6–9 April	Brussels (Belgium)	State visit. Meeting with King Baudouin of Belgium and François-Xavier Ortoli, President of the European Commission. Promoted the Charter of Economic Rights and Duties of States.
9–12 April	Paris (France)	State visit. Promoted the Charter of Economic Rights and Duties of States.
9–19 April	Moscow (Soviet Union)	State visit. Meeting with Nikolai Podgorny, chairman of the presidium of the Soviet Union, Alexei Kosygin, Soviet prime minister, and Leonid Brezhnev, general secretary of the Communist Party of the Soviet Union and the country's top leader. Trade agreements were signed and the Charter of Economic Rights and Duties of States was promoted.
19–24 April	Beijing (China)	State visit. Meeting with Mao Zedong, chairman of the Chinese Communist Party, the country's top leader, and Prime Minister Zhou Enlai; trade agreements were signed and the Charter of Economic Rights and Duties of States was promoted.
1974 (Note: On the return from the European tour, there was a one-day rest stop in Nassau, Bahamas, on 16 February. There were no official activities during the stopover.)
2 February	Munich (Germany)	Private meeting.
3–6 February	Salzburg (Austria)	Participation in the summit of the Club of Rome.
6–8 February	Bonn (Germany)	State visit.
8–11 February	Rome (Italy)	State visit.
8 February	Vatican City (Vatican City)	Audience with Pope Paul VI.
11–13 February	Vienna (Austria)	State visit.
13–15 February	Belgrade (Yugoslavia)	State visit.
10 July	San José (Costa Rica)	State visit.
11–14 July	Quito (Ecuador)	State visit.
14–18 July	Lima (Peru)	State visit.
18–22 July	Buenos Aires (Argentina)	State visit.
22–25 July	São Paulo and Brasília (Brazil)	State visit.
25–30 July	Caracas (Venezuela)	State visit.
30–31 July	Kingston (Jamaica)	State visit.
21 October	Tubac and Tucson (United States)	Working meeting with President Gerald Ford.
12 December	New York (United States)	Participation in the United Nations General Assembly.
1975
8–10 July	Georgetown (Guyana)	State visit.
10–14 July	Dakar (Senegal)	State visit.
14–17 July	Algiers (Algeria)	State visit.
17–21 July	Tehran (Iran)	State visit.
21–24 July	Colombo (Sri Lanka)	State visit.
25–28 July	Dar es Salaam (Tanzania)	State visit.
28–31 July	Kuwait City (Kuwait)	State visit.
31 July – 4 August	Riyadh (Saudi Arabia)	State visit.
4–7 August	Cairo (Egypt)	State visit.
7–10 August	Tel Aviv and Jerusalem (Israel)	State visit. Meeting with President Ephraim Katzir and Prime Minister Yitzhak Rabin. He also held a meeting with PLO leader Yasser Arafat.
10–13 August	Amman (Jordan)	State visit.
14–22 August	Havana (Cuba)	State visit.
November	Guatemala City (Guatemala)	State visit.
1976
No official foreign visits

=== Failed campaign for United Nations Secretary-General ===
In 1976, Echeverría sought to parlay his Third World credentials and relationship with the recently deceased Mao Zedong into becoming Secretary-General of the United Nations. Secretary-General Kurt Waldheim of Austria was running for a second term in the 1976 Secretary-General selection. Although Secretaries-General usually run unopposed, the People's Republic of China expressed dissatisfaction that a European headed an organization that had a Third World majority. On 18 October 1976, Echeverría entered the race against Waldheim. He was defeated by a large margin when the Security Council voted on 7 December 1976. The PRC did cast one symbolic Security Council veto against Waldheim in the first round, but voted in the Austrian's favor in the second round. Echeverría received only 3 votes to Waldheim's 14, with only Panama abstaining.

=== 1976 election, devaluation of the Peso and final stretch of his Presidency ===
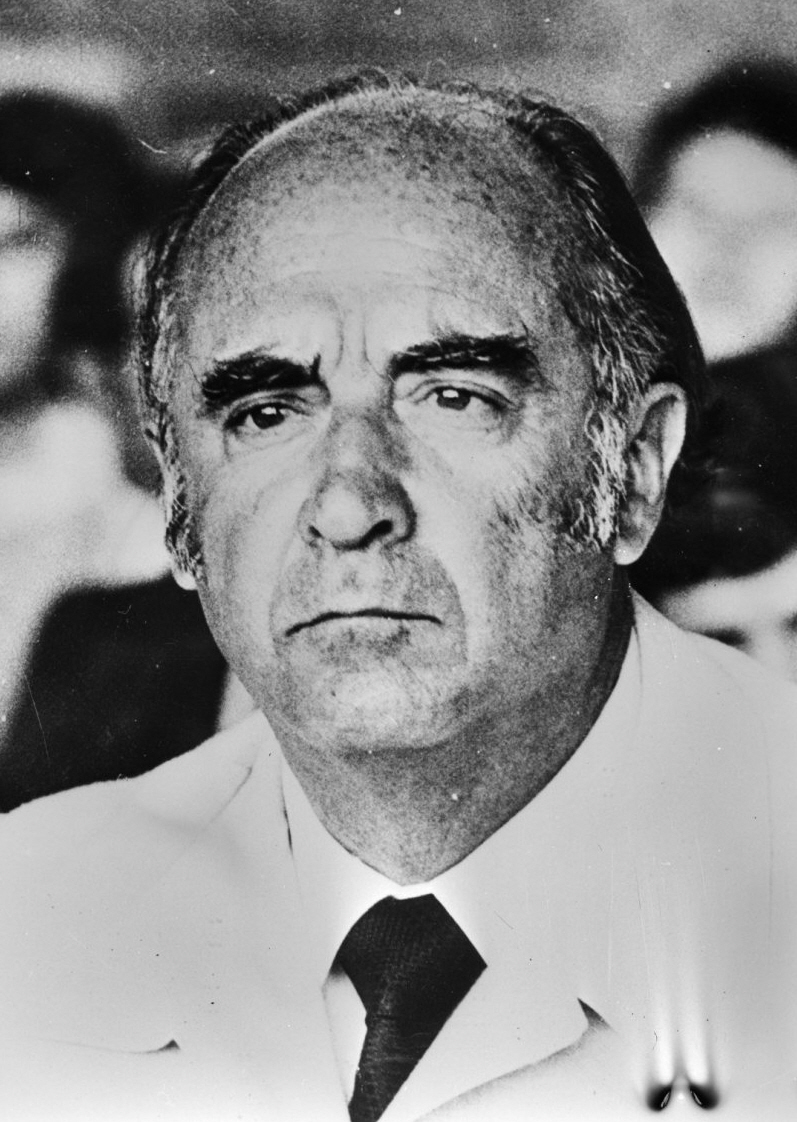
José López Portillo, Echeverría's childhood friend and eventual presidential successor

Echeverría designated José López Portillo, his finance minister and childhood friend, as the PRI's presidential candidate in the 1976 general election and, in effect, as his successor in the presidency. The PRI unveiled López Portillo's candidacy on 22 September 1975, choosing him over Porfirio Muñoz Ledo and Interior Minister Mario Moya Palencia. López Portillo and Echeverría were in the same age cohort, but López Portillo was not a practiced politician. He had been groomed from early on in Echeverría's term to be his successor and had no power base himself, whereas Moya Palencia and Muñoz Ledo had the support of many senior PRI politicians and office holders, as well as independent power bases.

López Portillo ran unopposed, since the Popular Socialist Party (PPS) and the Authentic Party of the Mexican Revolution (PARM), both PRI satellite parties, supported his candidacy, while the right-wing National Action Party (PAN) was unable to nominate a presidential candidate due to internal conflicts. The Mexican Communist Party (PCM) nominated Valentín Campa as its presidential candidate, but this party had no official registry and was barred from elections at the time, so Campa's candidacy was not officially recognized and he ran as a write-in candidate.

In private, López Portillo's aides expressed their hope that president Echeverría could become Secretary-General of the United Nations so that he would be out of the country for most of López Portillo's term and therefore would be unable to try to influence the latter's administration.

Shortly after the election, a couple of devaluations of the peso reflected the financial issues of the Echeverría administration, and his last months in office were marked by a general sense of economic malaise. Between 1954 and 1976, successive governments had maintained the value of the peso at 12.50 to the U.S. dollar. On 30 August 1976, as a result of the mounting economic problems, the Echeverría administration devalued the peso by 59.2%, leaving it with a value of 19.90 to the dollar. Two months later, the peso was devalued for a second time, now down to a rate of 26.60 to the dollar. Future President Miguel de la Madrid, who was then Subsecretary of Finance, stated in his autobiography that in those last months President Echeverría had an "unstable" mood and would sometimes fall asleep during cabinet meetings; De la Madrid also recounted that, at one of such meetings in that period, Fausto Loredo Zapata –then Subsecretary of the Presidency of the Republic– told Echeverría that he possessed a list of the forty most important men in Mexico and that it was necessary to "declare war on them" and arrest them that night, but Echeverría rejected the suggestion.

In this context, in October 1976 Echeverría made an agreement with the International Monetary Fund, which accepted to give Mexico financial aid of up to 1,200 million dollars, and in exchange Mexico committed to correct the imbalances of its balance of payments and to follow an orthodox economic policy for the following three years, which included measures such as increases in public rates and taxes, as well as wage freezes. There is some controversy as to whether the President-elect López Portillo was informed of this agreement with the IMF, which was essentially dictating key aspects of his economic policy before he could take office, and it was reported that Julio Rodolfo Moctezuma, his first Minister of Finance, even denied the existence of such an agreement with the IMF shortly after he was appointed. In any case, on 23 December 1976 the López Portillo government ratified the agreement with the IMF after a heated debate with his cabinet.

== Post-presidency ==
=== Continued influence ===
Echeverría imposed appointees on the new president, such as Hermenegildo Cuenca Díaz for governor of Baja California. López Portillo's Minister of the Interior, Jesús Reyes Heroles, kept the president abreast of Echeverría's overstepping boundaries, such as use of the presidential telephone network, visits to ministers, and meetings with political elites at his residence. Reyes Heroles took a series of steps to outflank Echeverría, including recording his conversations on the presidential telephone network and suggesting the replacement of officials supportive of Echeverría.

Echeverría was ambassador to Australia and New Zealand from 1978 to 1979.

Despite not keeping influence over López Portillo after their break, Echeverría continued to have some influence in Mexican politics. Miguel de la Madrid, president from 1982 to 1988, said in his autobiography that the idea for his 1987 Pact of Economic Solidarity [es] to contain inflation came from a suggestion made by Echeverría at a breakfast with him, during which the former president advised De la Madrid to invite the leading figures of the economic sectors to the National Palace so that they could talk to each other and agree on proposals to overcome the crisis.

After leaving office, Carlos Salinas de Gortari, the president from 1988 to 1994, publicly accused Echeverría of inspiring the March 1994 murder of their party's presidential candidate, Luis Donaldo Colosio, and of leading a conspiracy against Salinas's reformist allies in the party, which had led to a systemic political and economic crisis. Salinas claimed that Echeverría pressed him to replace the murdered candidate Colosio with an old-guard figure.

Echeverría's brother-in-law, Rubén Zuno Arce, was convicted by a California court in 1992 and sentenced to life in prison for his role in the Guadalajara drug cartel and the murder of a U.S. federal agent seven years earlier. Echeverría repeatedly requested President Carlos Salinas to pressure Washington for Zuno Arce's release, but to no avail.

After the defeat of the PRI in the general elections of July 2000, it emerged that Vicente Fox (the president from 2000 to 2006) had met privately with Echeverría at the latter's home in Mexico City numerous times during his presidential campaign in 1999 and 2000.

Fox appointed several Echeverría loyalists to top positions in his government, including Adolfo Aguilar Zínser, who headed Echeverría's "Third World University" in the 1970s, as national security advisor, and Juan José Bremer (Echeverría's personal secretary) as ambassador to the United States. The most controversial was Alejandro Gertz Manero, who had been accused by the Mexican press of bearing responsibility for the suicide of a museum owner in 1972, as Gertz, then working for Echeverría's attorney general, attempted to confiscate his private collection of pre-Hispanic artifacts (Echeverría also had a collection of such artifacts). Fox appointed Gertz as chief of the Federal Police.

=== Charges ===
In 2002, Echeverría was the first political official called to testify before the Mexican justice system for the Tlatelolco massacre of students in the Plaza de las Tres Culturas in Tlatelolco in 1968. On 23 July 2006, a special prosecutor indicted Echeverría and requested his arrest for allegedly ordering the attack that killed and wounded many student demonstrators during a protest in Mexico City over education funding on 10 June 1971. The incident became known as the Corpus Christi massacre for the feast day on which it took place, but also as the Halconazo ("Falcon Strike") since the special unit involved was called Los Halcones ("The Falcons"). The evidence against Echeverría appeared to be based on documents that allegedly show that he ordered the formation of special army units that committed the killings and that he had received regular updates about the episode and its aftermath from his chief of secret police. At the time, the government argued police forces and civilian demonstrators were attacked and people on both sides killed by armed civilians, who were convicted and later freed because of a general amnesty.

After the political transition of 2000, Echeverría was charged with genocide by the special prosecutor, an untested charge in the Mexican legal system, partly because the statute of limitations for charges of homicide had expired (charges of genocide under Mexican law have no statute of limitations since 2002). On 24 July 2004, a judge refused to issue an arrest warrant for Echeverría because of the statute of limitations, apparently rejecting the special prosecutor's assertion of genocide-based special circumstances. The special prosecutor said that he would appeal the judge's decision.

On 24 February 2005, the Supreme Court of Justice decided 4–1 that the statute of limitations (30 years) had expired by the time the prosecution began and that Mexico's ratification by Congress in 2002 of the convention on 26 November 1968, signed by the president on 3 July 1969 but ratified by Congress on 10 December 2001 and coming into effect 90 days later, which states that genocide has no statute of limitations, could not be applied retroactively to Echeverría's case since only Congress can make such agreements part of the legal system.

While difficult to obtain a prosecution, the prosecution argued before the Supreme Court that political conditions prevented an earlier prosecution, the president was constitutionally protected against charges for his full term so the statute of limitations should be extended, and the UN convention accepted by Mexico covered past events of genocide.

The Supreme Court said that the law did not take into account political conditions and presidential immunity in calculating the statute of limitations, the prosecution failed to prove earlier charges against the defendants (producing only photocopies, with no legal value, of supposed legal proceedings from the late 1970s and early 1980s), and Article 14 of the Constitution bans retroactivity of laws.

On 20 September 2005, the special prosecutor for crimes of the past filed genocide charges against Echeverría for his responsibility, as interior minister at the time, on 2 October 1968 Tlatelolco massacre. Again, the assigned criminal judge dismissed the file and held that the statute of limitations had expired and that the massacre did not constitute genocide. An arrest warrant for Echeverría was issued by a Mexican court on 30 June 2006, but he was found not guilty of the charges on 8 July 2006. On 29 November 2006, he was charged with the massacres and ordered under house arrest by a Mexican judge.

Finally, on 26 March 2009, a federal court ordered Echeverría's absolute freedom and dismissed the charge of genocide for the events of Tlatelolco.

== Personal life ==
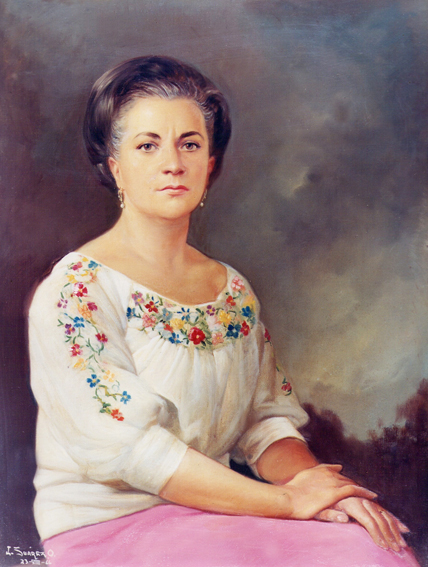
Portrait of Echeverría's wife, María Esther Zuno

On 2 January 1945, Echeverría married María Esther Zuno, whom he was married to until her death in 1999, and they had eight children:

- Luis Vicente Echeverría Zuno (d. 2013), married to Rosa Luz Alegría
- María del Carmen Echeverría Zuno, an artist
- Álvaro Echeverría Zuno (1948–2020), an economist
- María Esther Echeverría Zuno, who has promoted her mother's artwork
- Rodolfo Echeverría Zuno (d. 1983)
- Pablo Echeverría Zuno, an author at UNAM
- Benito Echeverría Zuno
- Adolfo Echeverría Zuno, a writer and teacher

Echeverría outlived three of his eight children. His son Rodolfo Echeverría Zuno drowned in a pool owned by his parents in 1983 due to embolism. Son Luis Vicente Echeverría Zuno died in Mexico City on 13 March 2013, after a failed heart operation. Son Álvaro Echeverría Zuno, an economist in the administration of Ernesto Zedillo, committed suicide on 19 May 2020, at age 71. As of 2019, he had 19 grandchildren and 14 great-grandchildren.

His brother, actor Rodolfo Landa, died on 14 February 2004, in Cuernavaca.

== Later life and death ==
On 15 January 2018, it was reported that he had died, but this was soon discounted. On 17 January, he celebrated his 96th birthday in a hospital and was discharged a day later. He was hospitalized again on 21 June 2018 and was discharged on 10 July.

Previously, the longest-lived Mexican president was Pedro Lascuráin, who died at age 96. By 2019, Echeverría, then aged 97, had passed Lascuráin's record and became the longest-lived president of Mexico.

On 21 April 2021, Echeverria, aged 99, made his last public appearance at the Estadio Olímpico Universitario, where he received his second dose of the COVID-19 vaccine.

Echeverría turned 100 on 17 January 2022, making him the longest-lived Mexican head of state. He died at his home in Cuernavaca on 8 July. He did not receive a state funeral and was cremated in a private memorial service held on 10 July.

== Legacy and public opinion ==
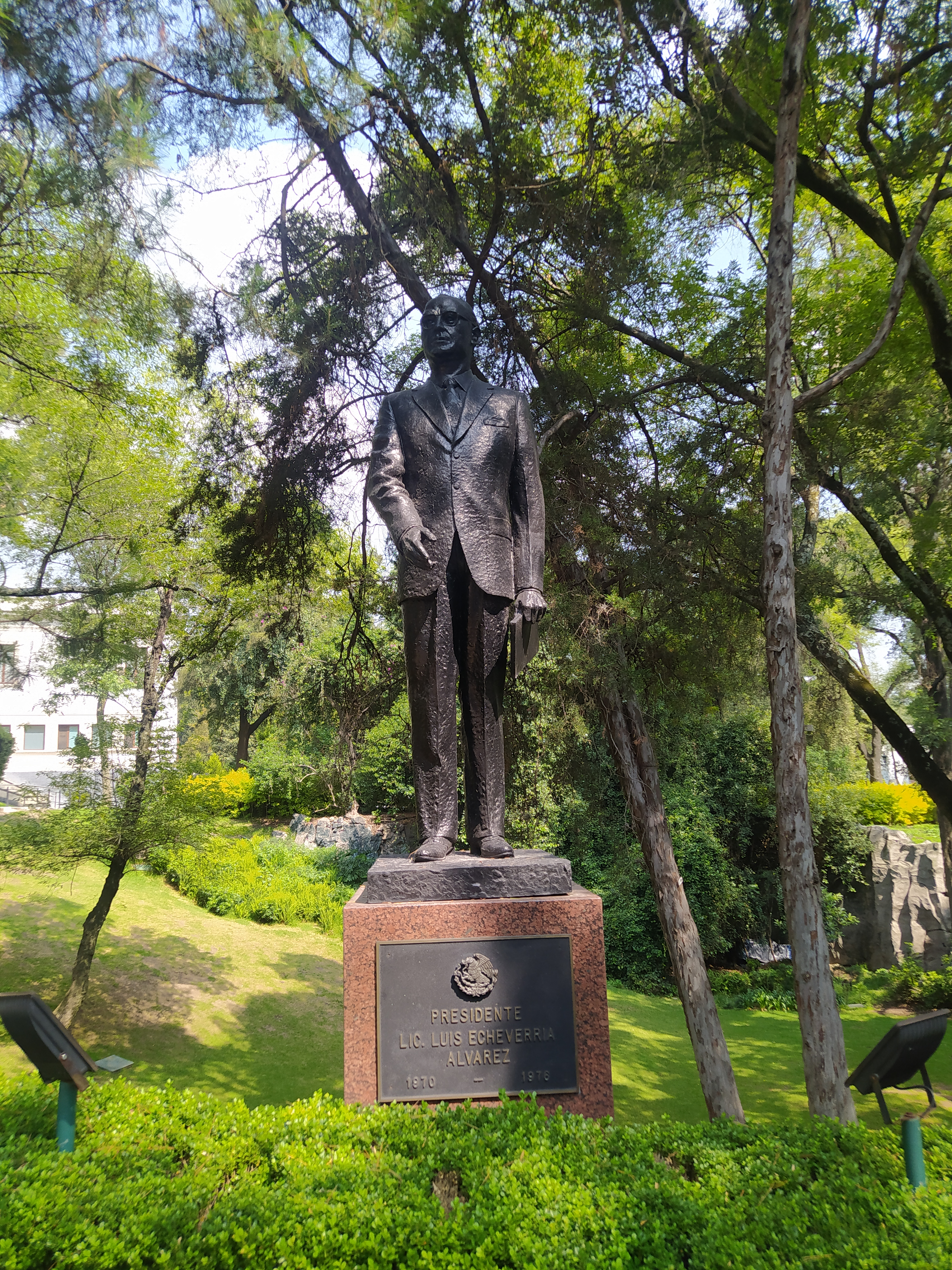
Statue of Luis Echeverría in Los Pinos, Mexico City.

Reporter Martin Walker notes that "Echeverria is hated by Mexico's left, who have sought to bring genocide charges against him as the minister of the interior responsible for the 1968 Olympic Games massacre of students and other protestors near downtown Mexico City. The Right in Mexico blames Echeverría for an economic disaster whose effects are still felt. When Echeverría took office, the Mexican peso was trading at just over 12 to the dollar and there was little foreign debt. He sharply increased indebtedness and eventually the peso collapsed to about one-thousandth of its 1970 exchange rate, wiping out the savings of the middle classes."

During his campaign and presidency, Echeverría adopted populist policies, attempting to portray himself as a "man of the people", in a similar style to Lázaro Cárdenas. Cárdenas's son, Cuauhtémoc Cárdenas, distinguishes Echeverría from his father by noting that after Echeverría left the presidency he was unable to retain much of the popularity that he developed. Historian Enrique Krauze speculates that Echeverría adopted populism to disassociate himself with the Tlatelolco massacre. Despite his efforts, Echeverría's legacy remains rooted in the political violence of and the economic crash that occurred during his tenure. However, Echeverría did have some support, and was seen by many average Mexican citizens as more receptive to their needs, as during his campaign he personally took thousands of petitions and listened to the concerns of common workers.

Porfirio Muñoz Ledo, who was Secretary of Labor and President of the PRI under Echeverría, defended the latter's administration and stated that Echeverría was very popular in the interior of the country, noting that the devaluation of the peso didn't occur until after the elections, describing the salary of the workers as "good" and highlighting the effusiveness of the Workers' Day parade on 1 May 1976, when Echeverría came down from the balcony of the National Palace to greet the parading workers:

"When have you ever seen again the President of the Republic standing alone in the street in front of the great waves of people who come and embrace him, including the independent unions, who paraded and at the end embraced him as well? So let's not extrapolate. That his government was unpopular is a huge lie."

Several other members of the PRI, particularly older members, disliked and criticized Echeverría's populist policies, including his predecessor Gustavo Díaz Ordaz. Díaz Ordaz once said of Echeverría, "He is out of control. He doesn't know what he is saying. He insists he's going to make changes, but he doesn't say to what end."

In a national survey conducted in 2012 about former presidents, 27% of the respondents considered that the Echeverría administration was "very good" or "good", 16% responded that it was an "average" administration, and 46% responded that it was a "very bad" or "bad" administration. He was the second-worst rated former president in the survey, with only Carlos Salinas de Gortari receiving a lower approval rating.

== In popular culture ==
Echeverría is portrayed by Alejandro de la Madrid in Women in Blue (Las Azules), the Apple TV+ Spanish-language crime drama created by Fernando Rovzar and Pablo Aramendi, which premiered globally on 31 July 2024. Set in Mexico City in 1971, during Echeverría's presidency, the series dramatizes the creation of the capital's first female police force, depicting the unit as a publicity exercise intended to divert public attention from official violence and from a series of unsolved murders.

De la Madrid, who was offered the part directly by Rovzar rather than through an audition, prepared by studying Echeverría's voice, posture and gestures with an acting coach, and wore prosthetics and a wig that took roughly three hours to apply. He described the role as that of an antagonist whom the production nonetheless sought to humanize, adding that the gaps in the historical record allowed the writers to heighten the character's antagonism.

De la Madrid reprised the role for the show's second season, which premiered on 12 August 2026 and follows an investigation reaching back to the student massacre of 1968.

== Honours and awards ==
- Grand Master of the Order of the Aztec Eagle, Mexico (1970–1976)
- Honorary Knight Grand Cross of The Most Honourable Order of the Bath (1973)
- Knight Grand Cross with Collar of the Order of Merit of the Italian Republic, Italy (8 February 1974)
- Great Star of the Decoration of Honour for Services to the Republic of Austria (1974)
- Honorary Member of the Order of Jamaica
- Order of the Yugoslav Great Star (13 February 1974)

== See also ==
- List of heads of state of Mexico
- List of centenarians (politicians and civil servants)

== Notes ==
Political offices
Preceded by Gustavo Díaz Ordaz	Secretary of the Interior; 1963–1969	Succeeded by Mario Moya Palencia
Preceded by Gustavo Díaz Ordaz	President of Mexico; 1970–1976	Succeeded by José López Portillo
