= People's Guerrilla Group =

Mexican guerrilla organization, 1963–1965

People's Guerrilla Group Grupo Popular Guerrillero
- Dates active: 1963–1965
- Active regions: Chihuahua, Mexico
- Ideology: Marxism–Leninism
- Political position: Left-wing
- Status: Defunct

The People's Guerrilla Group (Spanish: Grupo Popular Guerrillero, the GPG) was a left-wing militant group in Mexico. It operated between 1963 and 1965, until a disastrous attack caused the death of most prominent members.

== History ==
Founded in 1963 in the north-western Mexican state of Chihuahua, the People's Guerrilla Group formed in the context of the period preceding the Dirty War. Left-wing and peasant unrest was near-constant in many parts of the country during this time, in opposition to the Institutional Revolutionary Party government.

The group's primary leader was Arturo Gámiz García, with Pablo Gómez Ramírez as a prominent theoretician and Salomón Gaytán as a military commander. The founding members were rural teachers, students and peasants, some of them members of the Popular Socialist Party. The primary ideology was Marxism–Leninism. Some researchers have additionally claimed a strong influence from the group's more well-known Latin American contemporary Che Guevara and his 1961 book La Guerra de Guerrillas, while others attribute the works of Mao Zedong as an at least secondary influence.

In the morning of 23 September 1965, the group launched an attack on some military barracks – the regional headquarters of the Mexican Army– in Ciudad Madera, the asalto al cuartel de Madera. The plan was to lead an assault consisting of three separate groups, with a total of about forty militants. However, only one of them went into action, as the second had chosen to withdraw as it was unable to find its way, and the third – carrying the heavier weapons – was delayed by impassable roads and swollen rivers caused by torrential rain the previous night.

The single group, consisting of only thirteen fighters, decided to commence the assault regardless of their low numbers. This was due to the mistaken belief that only two platoons guarded the barracks. In fact, there were a full 125 officers in the area. The attack took place at dawn, and was quickly repelled. It has been said that their quick defeat was due to a driver turning on his locomotive's lights by accident, lighting up the entrenched guerrillas and making them easy targets.

As a result of the brief combat, six military defenders were killed: Lieutenant Marcelino Rigoberto Aguilar, Sergeants Nicolás Estrada Gómez and Moisés Bustillo Orozco, Corporal Felipe Reyna López, and the soldiers Jorge Velázquez and Virgilio Yáñez Gómez. Among the guerrillas, eight of thirteen were killed: the teacher and GPG leader himself, Arturo Gámiz García, the physician and Escuela Normal Rural "Ricardo Flores Magón" de Saucillo Chih professor Pablo Gómez Ramírez, the student (and Arturo's brother) Emilio Gámiz García, the peasants Antonio Scobell and Salomón Gaytán, the student Oscar Sandoval Salinas, and the teachers Miguel Quiñones Pedroz and Rafael Martínez Valdivia.

=== Legacy ===
While small and brief, People's Guerrilla Group and their actions had a significant impact on the rapid development of guerrilla warfare in rural and urban Mexico during the following years. Numerous militant groups took their names from the GPG and the assault on the Madera barracks, including the Grupo Guerrillero del Pueblo Arturo Gámiz, the Grupo 23 de Septiembre, the Movimiento 23 de Septiembre, and the prominent Liga Comunista 23 de Septiembre.
