= Popular Revolutionary Army =

Mexican Maoist guerilla movement

- Ejército Popular Revolucionario
- Leader: Edmundo Reyes (alleged)
- Dates active: 1996–present
- Active regions: Guerrero; Oaxaca; Chiapas; Guanajuato; Tlaxcala; Veracruz
- Ideology: Marxism–Leninism; Maoism
- Political position: Far-left
- Size: 200–2,000
- Wars: Guerrero conflict, Chiapas conflict and Mexican drug war

The Popular Revolutionary Army (Spanish: Ejército Popular Revolucionario, EPR) is a far-left guerrilla movement in Mexico. Though it operates mainly in the state of Guerrero, it has conducted operations in other southern Mexican states, including Oaxaca, Chiapas, Guanajuato, Tlaxcala and Veracruz.

The EPR announced its existence on June 28, 1996, at the commemoration of the Aguas Blancas massacre one year earlier. Dozens of rebels, carrying AK-47 and AR-15 rifles, declared war against the Mexican government and read aloud the "Aguas Blancas Manifesto", as well as firing 17 shots into the air to pay respect to the 17 who died in the massacre.

== Political ideology ==
Flag of the EPR

The Popular Revolutionary Army advocates a socialist peasant revolution. Subcomandante Marcos has distanced the EZLN from the EPR in his communiqués, largely because of the EPR activities in the state of Chiapas in the midst of peace talks in 1996 and 1997. The EPR though still asserts its support of the Zapatistas.

The Popular Revolutionary Army has founded a militarized political party, the Popular Revolutionary Democratic Party, or Partido Democrático Popular Revolucionario. The group often signs its communiqués PDPR-EPR, combining the Spanish initials of the army and the party. However, the Popular Revolutionary Democratic Party does not function in the political world independent of the Popular Revolutionary Army; the party does not appear on ballots in any local or federal elections.

== Attacks ==
=== 1990s ===
June 28, 1996: After the reading of the "Aguas Blancas Manifesto" by "Captain Emiliano", guerrillas engaged police in a fire fight near the Guerrero capital of Chilpancingo, wounding several policemen and one civilian.

July 2, 1996: An EPR communiqué warns of "imminent" armed clashes with the army and police, this in response to the massive military presence in the area. Military intelligence concludes the EPR to be a genuine force, better equipped and organized than the EZLN.

July 17, 1996: An attack on an army patrol in the southwest of Guerrero wounds several soldiers and kills one civilian. Two weeks later an ambush on Navy patrolmen leaves another wounded.

August 7, 1996: EPR snipers killed one soldier and wounded several others. The EPR general command gave a press interview the same day. On August 25, the rebels claim to have killed 59 soldiers since June 28.

August 28 and 29: The largest assault so far, exceeding public and government conceptions about the group's strength. A coordinated multistate attack hits army, police, and government targets in Oaxaca, Guerrero, Puebla and the Federal District, killing 18 and wounding more than two dozen. The EPR claims 41 dead and 48 wounded. Guerrilla forces also blocked roads in Chiapas to distribute pamphlets and seized a radio station in Tabasco. President Zedillo at his State of the Union Address (Segundo Informe de Gobierno) said: "Against terrorism, all the power of the State" in a message that terrorist acts would be prosecuted.

May 1997: Two engagements left 5 soldiers and 4 guerrillas dead.

=== 2000s ===
July 2007: EPR claimed responsibility for several attacks against Pemex oil facilities in the Bajío region and stated that the attacks would continue until two of its members were released. The government denies responsibility for the disappearance of these 2 members.

August 1, 2007: EPR also claimed responsibility for a bomb attack on a Sears store in Oaxaca; there was some damage but no injuries. On the same day the EPR also claimed responsibility for an attempted bombing of a Banamex bank branch also in Oaxaca.

September 10, 2007: Pemex reported explosions due to sabotage on several pipelines located in the key energy producing state of Veracruz and further inland in Tlaxcala. According to reports, there were six explosions targeting pipelines carrying natural gas, propane, and crude oil. The effects of the explosions were so severe that they caused the evacuation of over 20,000 people from the area. The explosions caused millions of dollars in damages to Pemex equipment. Additionally, it is estimated the explosions cost the Mexican economy $100 million a day as over 2,500 businesses were affected and 60% of Mexico's steel industry was shuttered. On September 11, 2007, the EPR claimed responsibility for the explosions.

=== 2010s ===
On October 6, 2014 the EPR released a video declaring war against Guerreros Unidos as response to an attack on protesters they claim the cartel was responsible for.

== Mexican government reaction ==
Following the July 2007 pipeline attacks, President Calderón deployed 5,000 special troops to secure the pipelines, along with dams and power plants. These troops began regular patrols of the region both on the ground and in the air. However, Pemex has 60,000 km of the pipeline so it will be difficult to secure the pipelines from saboteurs.

Shortly after the September pipeline attacks, the Centro de Investigación y Seguridad Nacional (Mexican intelligence service) leaked a report stating that Venezuela's President Hugo Chavez was believed to be supporting the EPR with materials, armament, and training.

Mexican magazine Contralínea has announced that at least 21 members of the EPR have gone missing apparently after being kidnapped by government forces since the arrival to power of President Calderón. These disappearances of political activists are not restricted to the EPR but also to many others independent activists. The government claims they are caused by narcotraffic gang disputes.
