= Atoyac de Álvarez =

City in the Mexican state of Guerrero

- City
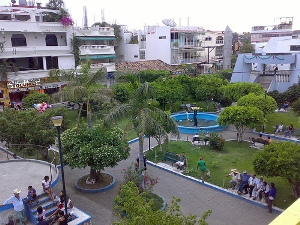

- Location in Mexico Atoyac de Álvarez (Mexico)
- Coordinates: 17°12′N 100°26′W
- Country: Mexico
- State: Guerrero
- Municipality: Atoyac de Álvarez

Population (2020)
  - Total: 22,271

Atoyac de Álvarez is a city and seat of the municipality of Atoyac de Álvarez, in the state of Guerrero, southern Mexico. It was affected by Hurricane Manuel in 2013.

== History ==
The village of Atoyac was founded in 1498 by Cuitlatec people. In the 1520s, Spanish control was extended over the Costa Grande of Guerrero, including Atoyac. Decades later in 1555, the village was evangelized by the Augustinian friar Juan Bautista Moya.

== Notable people ==
- Juan Álvarez (1790-1867), president of Mexico from October 4,1855 to December 11,1855
