= Genaro Vázquez Rojas =

Mexican revolutionary (1931–1972)

- Born: 10 June 1931; San Luis Acatlán, Guerrero, Mexico
- Died: 2 February 1972 (aged 40)
- Education: National Autonomous University of Mexico

Genaro Vázquez Rojas (10 June 1931 – 2 February 1972) was a Mexican school teacher, organiser, militant, and guerrilla fighter.

== Civic Associations ==
=== Guerreran Civic Community ===
Genaro Vázquez Rojas studied law at the National Autonomous University of Mexico (Spanish: Universidad Nacional Autónoma de México) (UNAM), but did not finish. At age 24 he co-founded the Guerreran Civic Community (CCG), while teaching at schools in the slums of the Federal District. In the following year, 1958, Vázquez Rojas participated in the Revolutionary Teachers' Movement (MRM) during the strike and seizure of the Secretariat of Public Education. Vázquez Rojas was eventually fired from his teacher's position and went on to represent coffee, copra, and palm workers before the Department of Agrarian Affairs and Colonization (DAAC).

=== Guerrero Civic Association ===
Between 1958 and 1960, the CCG transformed into the Guerrero Civic Association (ACG) with the stated goals of fighting for land reform and peasant workers. On May 13, 1960, Vázquez Rojas called his first neighborhood meeting in the San Francisco district of Chilpancingo, Guerrero, demanding an investigation of Raul Caballero Aburto, then Governor of Guerrero. On October 30, 1960, the ACG led 5,000 people in protest in a civic stand-in, similar to that of a sit-in, in support of recent demonstrations by students at the state university. Two years later, on December 31, 1962, 3,000 protesters assembled in Iguala, police attacked the demonstrators, 28 people were killed, dozens wounded, and 156 were arrested. The ACG was outlawed following the protests and Vázquez Rojas was accused of killing an agent assigned to watch him. Vázquez Rojas fled to the north-east, where he lay in hiding for four years.

Genaro Vázquez Rojas was eventually captured at the offices of the National Liberation Movement (Spanish: Movimiento de Liberación National) (MLN) on November 9, 1966. On April 22, 1968, the ACG attacked the prison in Iguala and freed its captured leader. Following the escape, Vázquez Rojas fled to the hills of the sierra, where he began working on the goals of the ACG on a national level. With the new outlook came a new name, the ACG was reformed into the Guerreran National Civic Association (GNCA).

=== Guerreran National Civic Association ===
The GNCA, inspired by Fidel Castro's 1962 Declaration of Havana and the National Liberation Movement's (MLN) August 1961 program, was created to sustain a prolonged guerrilla struggle. The GNCA aimed to create links to other guerrilla organizations and coordinate revolution not just through Guerrero, but also throughout the country. In December 1971, once the goals of the GNCA had been met, the organization was renamed to the Asociación Cívica Nacional Revolucionaria (ACNR). The ACNR continued to support the guerrilla groups and work toward uniting other radical groups.

=== Asociación Cívica Nacional Revolucionaria ===
The ACNR conducted three guerrilla operations, all taking place between the years of 1969 and 1971. On April 19, 1969, the ACNR organized an assault on the Mexican Commercial Bank; the attack was deemed a failure as the police were able to recover three million stolen pesos and detain the guerrillas who conducted the raid. Due to a mechanical problem with the getaway vehicle, a taxi, the guerrillas were quickly captured and brought to custody. On January 5, 1971, Conaciano Luna Radilla, manager of Commercial Bank of the South, was kidnapped on the highway. A ransom of half a million pesos was requested and received and Conaciano was freed. The final act was taken on November 19, 1971, with the kidnapping of Jaime Castrejón Diez. Diez was the owner of a Coca-Cola concession, proprietor of "Yoli" soft drink factories, Chancellor of University of Guerrero, and ex-mayor of Taxco. The ACNR demanded the release of nine political prisoners, two and a half million pesos, and formal trials of all peasants held in military barracks. The ACNR received a ransom of 500,000 pesos, and the release of the nine political prisoners to Cuba. Diez was released on December 1, 1971.

== Death ==
The ACNR, operating along the Costa Grande between Acapulco and the Balsas River, drew the ire of the federal government for their actions. In response, they were pursued by army battalions, helicopters, paratroopers, and counter-insurgency technology developed by the United States in Vietnam. On 2 February 1972, Vázquez Rojas was captured by the army after fleeing a car wreck; it is believed he died from his wounds, although local sources in Morelia disputed the government’s statement and claimed that Vázquez was extrajudicially executed by the army.
