= Batallón Olimpia =

Mexican paramilitary group involved in suppressing the 1968 Student Movement

- Active: 1968–1976
- Country: Mexico
- Allegiance: Mexican government
- Type: Parapolice
- Role: Utilized to fire on students and soldiers to sow confusion during the events of October 2, 1968; Used to massacre student demonstrators during El Halconazo
- Size: 1,500–2,000 members

The Batallón Olimpia was a counterinsurgent paramilitary group created by the Mexican government to surveil, spy on, pursue, sabotage, execute, murder, and disappear members of the Mexican Movement of 1968 and to infiltrate the movement itself.

== Background ==
The battalion was under the command of general Luis Gutiérrez Oropeza and consisted of elements from the Estado Mayor Presidencial and Dirección Federal de Seguridad, the Policía Judicial Federal (Federal Judicial Police), the Policía Judicial del Distrito Federal (Mexico City Federal Judicial Police), and the Inspección Fiscal Federal (Federal Tax Inspection). It is estimated to have had around 1,500 to 2,000 members.

The Batallón Olimpia took an active part in various moments of the 1968 Movement, including:

- The Occupation of the UNAM Ciudad Universitaria on September 18, 1968
- The occupation of Casco de Santo Tomás, an Instituto Politécnico Nacional campus, on September 23, 1968
- Operación Galeana on October 2, 1968, in the Plaza de las Tres Culturas in Tlatelolco, Mexico City

Because members of the battalion were undercover soldiers and police officers dressed in civilian clothes, they identified each other through white handkerchiefs or gloves. The battalion played an active part in these events, orchestrating a simulated confrontation near the armed student movement and the Mexican military. To that effect, the battalion had, in addition to its members mobilized throughout the plaza and neighboring buildings, snipers posted beginning the morning of October 2 in the plaza and the surrounding area. In addition to these armed actions, there is a record of the battalion allegedly performing illegal detentions, abuse, torture, and raids of people's homes.

The night of October 2, 1968, the Batallón Olimpia had orders to fire on both the students and the soldiers to confuse the situation and make the army fire on the students. They infiltrated the protest until it arrived on the third floor of the Chihuahua building. The army arrested some of the battalion's members who were later freed on presidential orders. The order to fire against the army and the protesters came from Secretary of the Interior Luis Echevarría Álvarez. Responsibility for this event is divided between Luis Gutiérrez Oropeza and President Gustavo Díaz Ordaz, but the person who was truly responsible was Luis Echevarría Álvarez.

In 1971, the group became active again, now under the direction of Luis Echevarría Álvarez, who became president of Mexico in 1970. This new attack was known as El Halconazo (The Falcon Strike). It occurred on June 10, 1971, when the paramilitary group the Halcones killed 120 people who were protesting in support of the Monterrey students.

== Cultural references ==
=== Films ===
- The movie Rojo Amanecer (1989), in which members of the Batallón Olimpia appear at the end of the movie.
- The channel 6 documentary Batallón Olimpia, which aired July 6, 1999.
- The movie Olimpia (2019) references the group in a scene in which the Tlatelolco Massacre is happening and a soldier gives one of the main characters' fathers a white glove to put on his son so that he will not be a target.

=== Literature ===
- The poem 'Las voces de Tlatelolco (1968) by José Emilio Pacheco
