= Brigada Blanca =

White Brigade
- Brigada Blanca
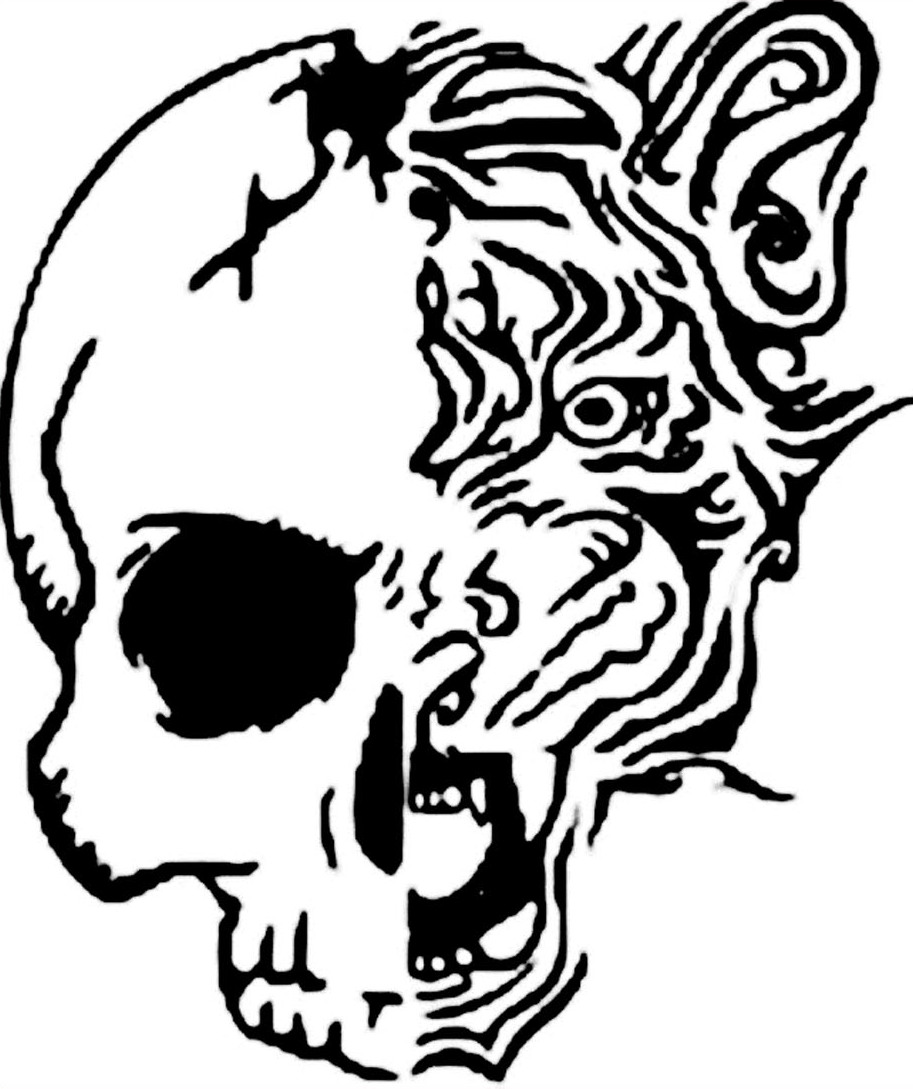
- The emblem of the unit
- Active: June 1976–August 1985
- Country: Mexico
- Allegiance: Dirección Federal de Seguridad
- Type: paramilitary unit
- Role: home invasions, illegal searches, robbery, arbitrary arrests, sabotage, enforced disappearance, kidnapping, torture, and extrajudicial killings
- Size: 240 agents
- Engagements: Mexican dirty war

Commanders
- Leader: Miguel Nazar Haro
- Legal advisor: Alfonso Cabrera Morales
- General Coordinator: Francisco Quirós Hermosillo

Brigada Blanca, ("White Brigade"), officially the Brigada Especial de La Dirección Federal de Seguridad ("Federal Security Directorate Special Brigade"), was a paramilitary group part of the Dirección Federal de Seguridad ("Directorate of Federal Security" or DFS) managed by the Mexican government that was active between 1976 and 1985. The group engaged in tactical operations supporting state terrorism, primarily against the Marxist–Leninist paramilitary group Liga Comunista 23 de Septiembre. Some of their tactics during the Mexican Dirty War included surveillance, home invasions, illegal searches, robbery, arbitrary arrests, private communication interception, sabotage, enforced disappearance, kidnapping, torture, and extrajudicial killings. 275 victims have been identified as being killed, tortured, or illegally detained by the organization. The brigade was headed by Miguel Nazar Haro.

== History ==
After the Mexican Movement of 1968 and the El Halconazo massacre in 1971 there was a general sentiment of political repression, which led to the formation of various leftist political groups opposed to the Mexican government. Some of these groups radicalized, forming guerrilla groups in both urban and rural areas, due to the belief that peaceful, democratic methods of political action were no longer available. Among them, the most prominent were the Federación de Estudiantes Revolucionarios ("Federation of Revolutionary Students"), Fuerzas Armadas Revolucionarios del Pueblo ("Revolutionary Armed Forces of the People"), Frente Urbano Zapatista ("Zapatista Urban Front"), Movimiento de Acción Revolucionaria ("Revolutionary Action Movement") and the LC23S. Counterinsurgency activities have been recorded as early as 1972. The United States actively encouraged groups whose ideals were grounded in anti-communism and McCarthyism. The US government trained large numbers of militants and police officers at the CIA-backed School of the Americas, some of whom would go on to act as militia leaders and insurgents of the Brigada Blanca.

On June 4, 1976, the LC23S attacked a police checkpoint in Ciudad Azteca ("Aztec City") neighborhood of Ecatepec de Morelos, a highly populated suburb of Mexico City. Following this attack, DFS agent Edmundo Arriage López, and officer Miguel Nazar Haro of the Policía Judicial del Distrito Federal ("Federal District Judicial Police"), met with Jesús Miyazawa Álvarez and Jorge Obregón Lima from the Direccíon de Investigaciones Políticas y Sociales de la Secretaría de Gobernación ("Secretary of the Government Directorate for Political and Social Investigations.") The president of Mexico, Luis Echeverría, ordered the formation of a "Special Brigade" inside the DFS under the jurisdiction of the Secretariat of the Interior, integrated with 240 agents, offices, and other intelligence elements from state and federal law enforcement groups including the Procuraduria General de la Republica, the Procuraduria del Distrito Federal, Dirección General de Policía, Departamento del Distrito Federal, and the Procuraduría General del Estado de Mexico. The brigade operated in the states of Guerrero, Sinaloa, Chihuahua, Nuevo León, Jalisco, Puebla, Morelos, the state of Mexico, and Mexico City. It was given the informal name Brigada Blanca by Miguel Nazar, contrasting with the Brigada Roja chapter of the LC23S, the name of the chapter that operated in Mexico Valley.

The offices of the brigade were located in Circular de Morelia No. 8 in the Colonia Roma neighborhood of Mexico City. It acted as a clandestine headquarters for temporary political detentions. Given its secretive operations, the exact operations were unknown, the building's address and phone number were hidden from public lists, and the location was kept out of public documents. The codeword for the organization used by police forces was the "BB" or "la Brigitte Bardot" named after the prominent 50s and 60s French model Brigitte Bardot.

The Brigada Blanca disappeared before the dissolution of the DFS and the Direccíon General de Investigaciones Políticas y Sociales on August 27, 1985, as another paramilitary group, the Grupo Jaguar was assigned to the Divisíon de Investigaciones para le Prevencíon de la Delincuencia under the orders of Arturo Durazo Moreno. Although after the dissolution of the Brigada Blanca there was no investigation into the incidents and excessive brutality committed by the Brigade.

== Brigade operations ==
The Brigada Blanca began "Plan of Operations Number One: Tracking" from June 4, 1976, with the aim to "investigate and locate by any means, the members of the so called Liga Comunista 23 de Septiembre" (LC23S). Among the members of the newly organized brigade were Fernando Gutiérrez Barrios, Jorge Obregón Lima, Javier García Paniagua, José Salomón Tanús, Francisco Sahagún Baca y Luis de la Barreda Moreno, Jesús Miyazawa Álvarez, Gabriel Sosa Cuevas, among others. The arrests were typically arbitrary; for example, a civil servant might have been detained or tortured merely for possessing the LC23S newspaper "Madera."

The brigade was structured as follows:

- A Security Commission, made up of the chiefs of the DFS, the Policía Judicial Federal, the Policía Judicial del Distrito Federal, the Dirección General de Policía y Tránsito del Departamento del Distrito Federal and Policía Militar. It was headed by Miguel Nazar Haro, his legal advisor Alfonso Cabrera Morales and his general coordinator Francisco Quirós Hermosillo.
- The general coordinator had a staff composed of the head of the Grupo de Interrogadores (Interrogation Task Force), head of the Grupo de Información y Operaciones (Operations and Information Task Force) and head of the Control y Manejo de Administración (Administration Management Task Force). Additionally, there were eight operations task forces, an aerial unit with helicopters, a task force for explosives management, a specialized armaments unit, and a communications interception task force.

The members of the brigade received police, military and counter-insurgency training at Campo Militar No. 1 from the Military Police Second Battalion of the Mexican Army for operations in the Mexico Valley. The Brigada Blanca was tasked with seven specific operations:

- Alert the population about the existence of urban guerillas. The DFS distributed flyers calling for patriotism, encouraging locals to report members of the LC23S and take photos of suspected insurgents, especially in areas where they were known to operate. They sought to use psychological warfare and false crises to foment anger against LC23S. Also the Brigada Blanca used the local block leader organization structure as an information network to alert police about groups of young people suspected of involvement in LC23S activities.
- Surveillance operations in populated areas. Attacking the ideology of the LC23S and other Marxist–Leninist guerillas, the brigade organized raids and patrols in manufacturing areas across the Mexico Valley, specifically those where the LC23S distributed its Madera newspaper. Brigade agents posed as taxi drivers, factory workers, and farmworkers and reported distributors.
- Illegal detention of family and non-affiliated associates of insurgents. They were interned at the Circular de Morelia No. 8 - Campo Militar Numero Uno.
- Monitoring secure compounds of the LC23S. This was conducted through searching for sites in populated areas where young people and apparent college students would conduct meetings, or even monitoring those who had watched such meetings. Later on they continued to monitor known LC23S members who were detained, tortured, and taken on patrols to identify LC23S these meeting locations.
- Detention of LC23S militants, arbitrarily and without any warrants and turning them over to prisons.
- Killing militants, particularly when agents faced armed resistance or through organizing extrajudicial killings, in addition to those killed while detained due to torture.
- Centralization of all information related to LC23S in a single government body.

The typical operation included the use of the basement of Circular de Morelia No. 8 for the interrogation and use of torture to extract information from detainees in addition to the use of Campo Militar Número Uno as a prison. At Circular de Morelia No. 8 it was decided for each detainee whether they would be driven to the Campo Militar Numero Uno, be freed, or be killed. Other clandestine prisons and military sites were used for incarceration and executions such as the Cuartel Militar de Atoyac de Alvarez and the Base Aérea de Pie de la Cuesta en Acapulco. According to Nazar Haro, the brigade's operations had the consent of the government to torture and "the least bit of compassion gave them hope. They told us that we had to be hard on them, those were the orders from up top, and we followed them." The forces involved were also known to keep the personal belongings of the detained and disappeared as "spoils of war." They also engaged in revenge killings known interally as El Tributo de Desagravio or "Tribute of Redress." For example, Salvador Corral García was detained and killed with his body left near them home of businessman Eugenio Garza Sada who had been kidnapped and killed by the LC23S. The operations were completely outside of the judicial system, acting without warrants, not offering due process to suspects, and engaging in executions despite the illegality of the death penalty in Mexico. The brutality with which the brigade acted against its victims was considered socking even to members of other police forces in Mexico. The DFS had to order local police forces to collaborate with the group during operations outside of Mexico City.

Despite their clandestine operations, the following specific incidents and victims have been publicly identified as being perpetrated by the Brigade:

- Arbitrary detention, torture and forced disappearance of LC23S member Jesús Piedra Ibarra.
- Arbitrary detention, torture and forced disappearance of LC23S member Alicia de los Ríos Merino. Members of the brigade interrogated her in order to identify compounds of the LC23S.
- Arbitrary detention, torture and imprisonment of LC23S member Mario "El Guaymas" Álvaro Cartagena López. Cartagena affirmed that it was José Salomón Tanus who tortured him in Campo Militar Número Uno.
- Arbitrary detention, illegal imprisonment, torture and forced disappearance of LC23S member Leticia Galarza Campos.
- Arbitrary detention, torture and illegal imprisonment of LC23S member Alfredo Medina Vizcaíno.
- Arbitrary detention, torture and illegal imprisonment of LC23S member Wenceslao "Sam" José García.

== Aftermath ==
Family members of victims of the Brigada Blanca engaged in protests and other forms of civil disobedience in attempts to stop the organization. In 1978 the mothers of victims organized a hunger strike, seeking to draw attention to the brigade's operations and demanded the return of their missing family members.

In response the government of José López Portillo enacted the Amnesty Law of 1978, without organizing judicial investigations. In 1988 Carlos Salinas de Gortari met with family members of the victims, again without any investigations or judicial actions against the brigade proposed.

In 2001 a report from the National Human Rights Commission of Mexico found evidence the brigade and its insurgents were responsible for the assassination, disappearance and torture of 275 people. In 2002, the Consejo de Guerra Militar de la Procuraduría General de Justicia Militar put general Mario Acosta Chaparro and general coordinator of the brigade Francisco Quirós Hermosillo on trial. Among the accusations made by the prosecution was the formation of the brigade "without legal basis, whose tactics were completely illegal." Both Acosta and Quirós were demoted from their military positions.

In 2020 the Government of Mexico inaugurated the Circular de Morelia memorial site in the former offices of the brigade.
