= White brigade =

White Brigade can mean any of the following:

- Witte Brigade, a World War II Belgian resistance group
- Brigada Blanca, a Mexican paramilitary group consisting of army and police personnel that used illegal tactics to destroy guerrilla movements.

See also:

- White Army
