= National Intelligence Centre =

National Intelligence Centre may refer to:

- National Intelligence Centre (Mexico)
- National Intelligence Centre (Spain)
