= El Halconazo =

1971 massacre of student demonstrators in Mexico

- Part of the Mexican Dirty War
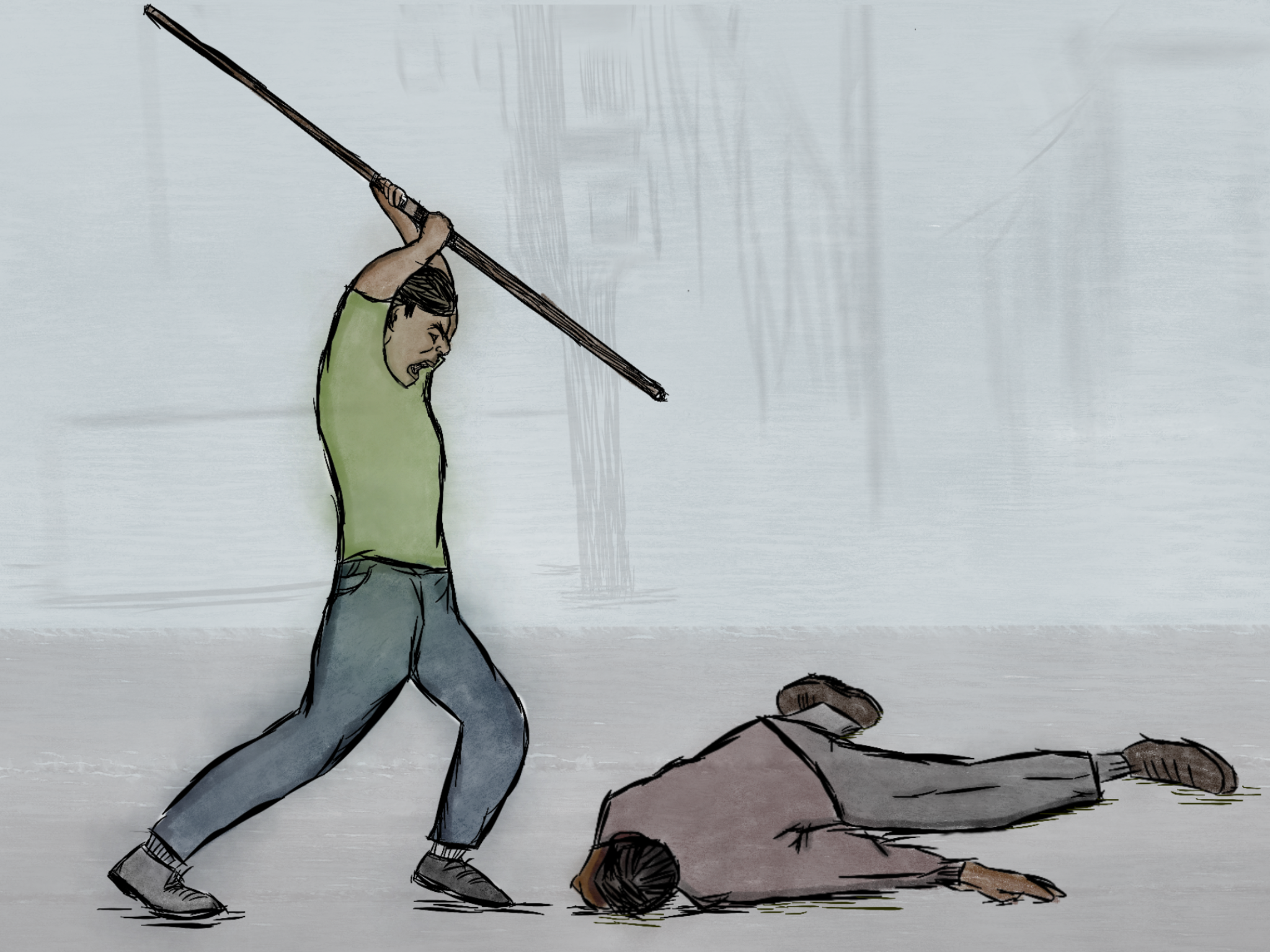
- Illustration of a member of the paramilitary group Los Halcones beating a demonstrator fallen on the ground, in the repression of June 10, 1971.

- Location: 19°26′40″N 99°10′03″W; Casco de Santo Tomás, Mexico City, Mexico
- Date: 10 June 1971; 55 years ago
- Attack type: Massacre
- Deaths: 120
- Perpetrator: Los Halcones

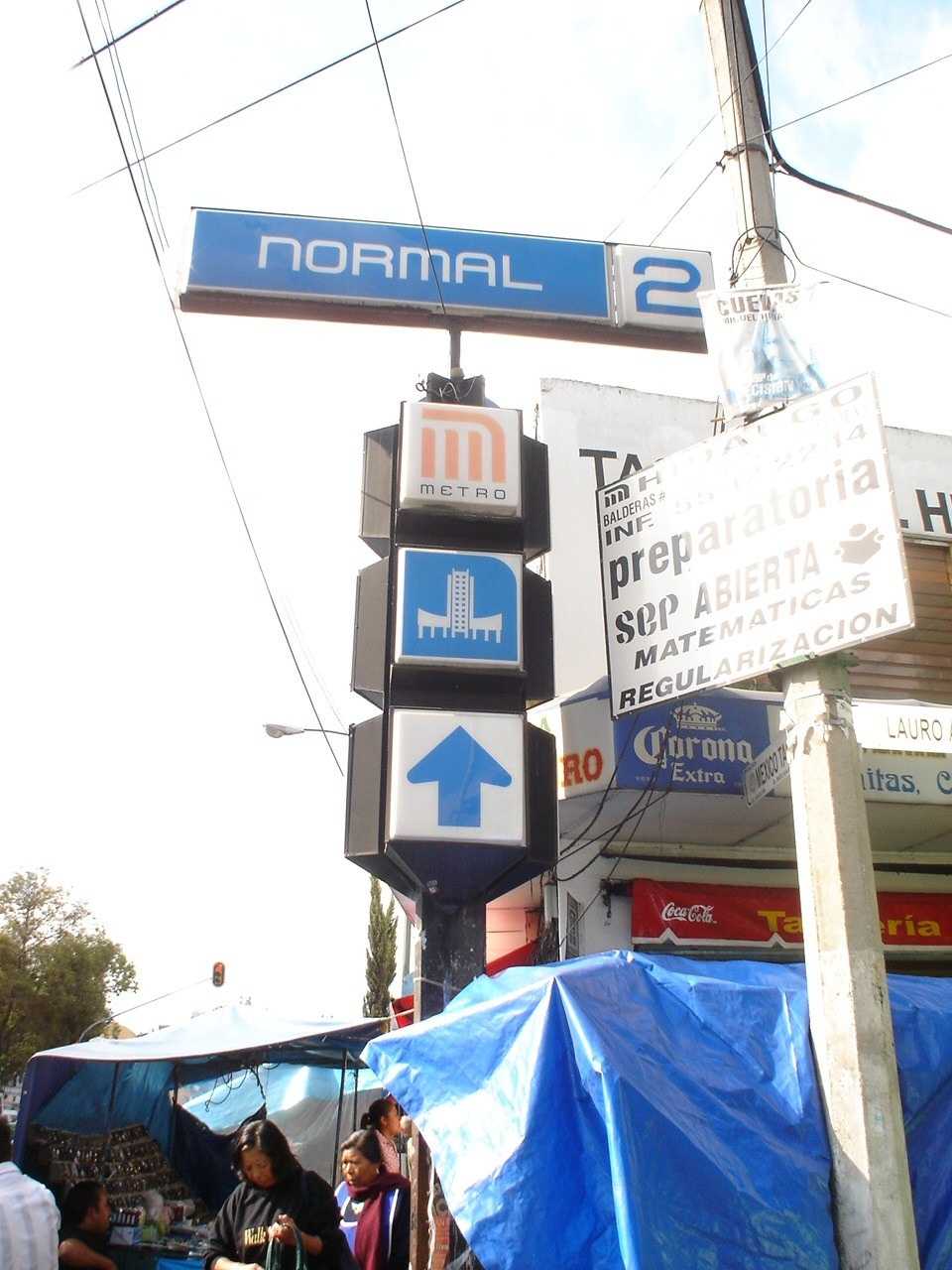
The Normal station of the Mexico City Metro was the scene of The Halconazo, the name given to the Corpus Thursday Massacre in 1971 in Mexico City.

El Halconazo (Spanish: The Falcon Strike), also known as the Corpus Christi Massacre (in Spanish: la matanza del Jueves de Corpus), was a massacre of student demonstrators by members of the Halcones, a state-sponsored paramilitary group, on 10 June 1971 in Mexico City. Occurring during the Mexican Dirty War, the massacre resulted in nearly 120 demonstrators being killed.

== Background ==
From his earliest days in office, President Luis Echeverría Álvarez announced intentions to reform democracy in Mexico. He immediately allowed some leaders of the 1968 student movement to return from exile in Chile and released many prisoners over the course of two years. In April 1971, the press spoke of coming reforms in education and soon figures such as José Revueltas and Heberto Castillo, both jailed for two and a half years, resurfaced in the political arena. Students were excited and thought they would have the opportunity to return to the streets to demonstrate dissatisfaction with the government. The conflict at the University of Nuevo León gave them a reason to do so: At the end of 1970, teachers and university students presented a basic law that proposed a joint government, and in March 1971 Héctor Ulises arrived at the rectory under the new law. The state government disagreed and slashed the budget, which angered university officials and led to the University Council's passage of a new bill that virtually abolished the autonomy of the institution. The university went on strike and called for solidarity with other universities. The National Autonomous University of Mexico and National Polytechnic Institute (IPN) immediately responded and the students called for a massive rally in support of Nuevo León on June 10, 1971.

On May 30 the governor of Nuevo León, Eduardo A. Elizondo Lozano, resigned as part of the settlement of the Ministry of Education. With the governor's resignation, by June 5, a new law came into force that resolved the conflict. Nevertheless, students decided to march even if the demands were not clear. The committee coordinating committee control (CoCo) was divided as there were those who thought that the march was useless and would only provoke the government. However, most people supported the law, arguing that there were many unresolved problems. It was also an opportunity for the government to show that it would not be as repressive as before. Days before the demonstration many police vehicles and cars started making regular runs near the Casco de Santo Tomás (one of the IPN's main campuses).

== Massacre ==
The march started at the Casco de Santo Tomás, and proceeded through Carpio and Maestros Avenues so the protesters could take the Mexico-Tacuba Causeway, and eventually end up at Zócalo. The streets leading to the Maestros Avenue were blocked by police officers and riot police, who did not allow the students to pass. There were tankettes parked along Melchor Ocampo Avenue, near the military school, and riot police trucks in a large police contingent at the intersection of the Melchor Ocampo and San Cosme avenues. A shock group trained by the Federal Security Directorate and the CIA, known as "los Halcones", who came in grey trucks, vans, and riot trucks, attacked students from streets near Maestros Avenue after the riot police opened their blockade. The shock group first attacked with bamboo and kendo sticks so the students easily repelled them. Los Halcones then attacked the students again, with high-caliber rifles, while students tried, unsuccessfully, to hide. The police did not intervene because they had been ordered not to. The shooting lasted for several minutes, during which some cars gave logistical support to the paramilitary group. The support included extra weapons and makeshift transports, such as civilian cars, vans, police vehicles and an ambulance from the Cruz Verde (an organization similar to the Red Cross). The injured were taken to the general hospital Rubén Leñero, but to no avail, as the Halcones reached the hospital and killed them, while many were still in the operating room, and took the opportunity to scare the patients and doctors. Nearly 120 protesters were killed, among them a fourteen-year-old boy.

That night army elements guarded the National Palace and Luis Echeverría announced an investigation into the killing and said he would punish the guilty. Alfonso Martínez Domínguez, then-Mexico City governor, and Julio Sánchez Vargas, attorney general, denied that there were Halcones and police chief Escobar blamed the students for creating extremist groups within their movement. A week passed before Escobar accepted that there were Halcones, but denied their involvement in the massacre. The high number of journalists and photographers hit and arrested by Halcones managed to contradict the government's official version. Martínez Domínguez tendered his resignation on June 15 to Echeverría because he was convinced that the protesters had been provoked, among other things, so the government had an excuse to get rid of him. Despite this, Martínez Domínguez was known for many years as "Halconzo", in reference to the Corpus Thursday Massacre.

The number of dead in the demonstration discouraged many students, but also led others to be radicalized, some of whom later formed urban guerrilla organizations. Students in 1971 especially demanded the democratization of education, control of the university budget by students and teachers, and that it represent 12% of the GDP. They also demanded political freedom wherein workers, peasants, students, and intellectuals could enjoy real democratic freedoms and control the social system; quality education for everyone, especially farmers and workers; greater respect for cultural diversity; strict democratic transparency; and support for the political union of the workers.

== Los Halcones ==
The Halcones were a Mexican paramilitary group created in the late 1960s and led by Colonel Manuel Díaz Escobar, then deputy director of General Services of the Federal District Department.

== In fiction ==
Mexican filmmaker Gabriel Retes produced, directed, and acted in a film titled El Bulto (The lump), where he portrays Lauro, a photojournalist, who was attacked by a Los Halcones member and left in a coma.

The massacre is featured in the 2018 film Roma.

The massacre is depicted in the first chapter of the 2021 novel Velvet Was the Night by Silvia Moreno-Garcia. One of the main characters, Elvis, is a member of Los Halcones.

== See also ==
- Tlatelolco Massacre
- Death of Giovanni López, whose repressed protests ended up being known as the "El Halconazo Tapatío"
- Dirty War (Mexico)
- List of massacres in Mexico
- Kent State shootings
- Batallón Olimpia
