= Rojo Amanecer =

1990 Mexican movie directed by Jorge Fons

- DVD cover
- Directed by: Jorge Fons
- Written by: Guadalupe Ortega; Xavier Robles
- Produced by: Hector Bonilla; Valentin Trujillo
- Starring: Héctor Bonilla; María Rojo
- Cinematography: Miguel Garzon
- Edited by: Sigfrido Garcia, Jr.
- Music by: Eduardo Roel; Karen Roel
- Release dates: December 1989 (Press release); 18 October 1990
- Running time: 96 minutes
- Country: Mexico
- Language: Spanish

Rojo Amanecer (Red Dawn) is a 1990 Mexican crime drama film, directed by Jorge Fons.

It dramatizes the Tlatelolco Massacre in the section of Tlatelolco that occurred in Mexico City, the evening of October 2, 1968.

It focuses on the day of a middle-class Mexican family living in one of the apartment buildings surrounding the Plaza de Tlatelolco (also known as the Plaza de las Tres Culturas) and is based on testimonials from witnesses and victims.

It stars Héctor Bonilla, María Rojo, Demián Bichir, Bruno Bichir, Eduardo Palomo and others.

== Synopsis ==
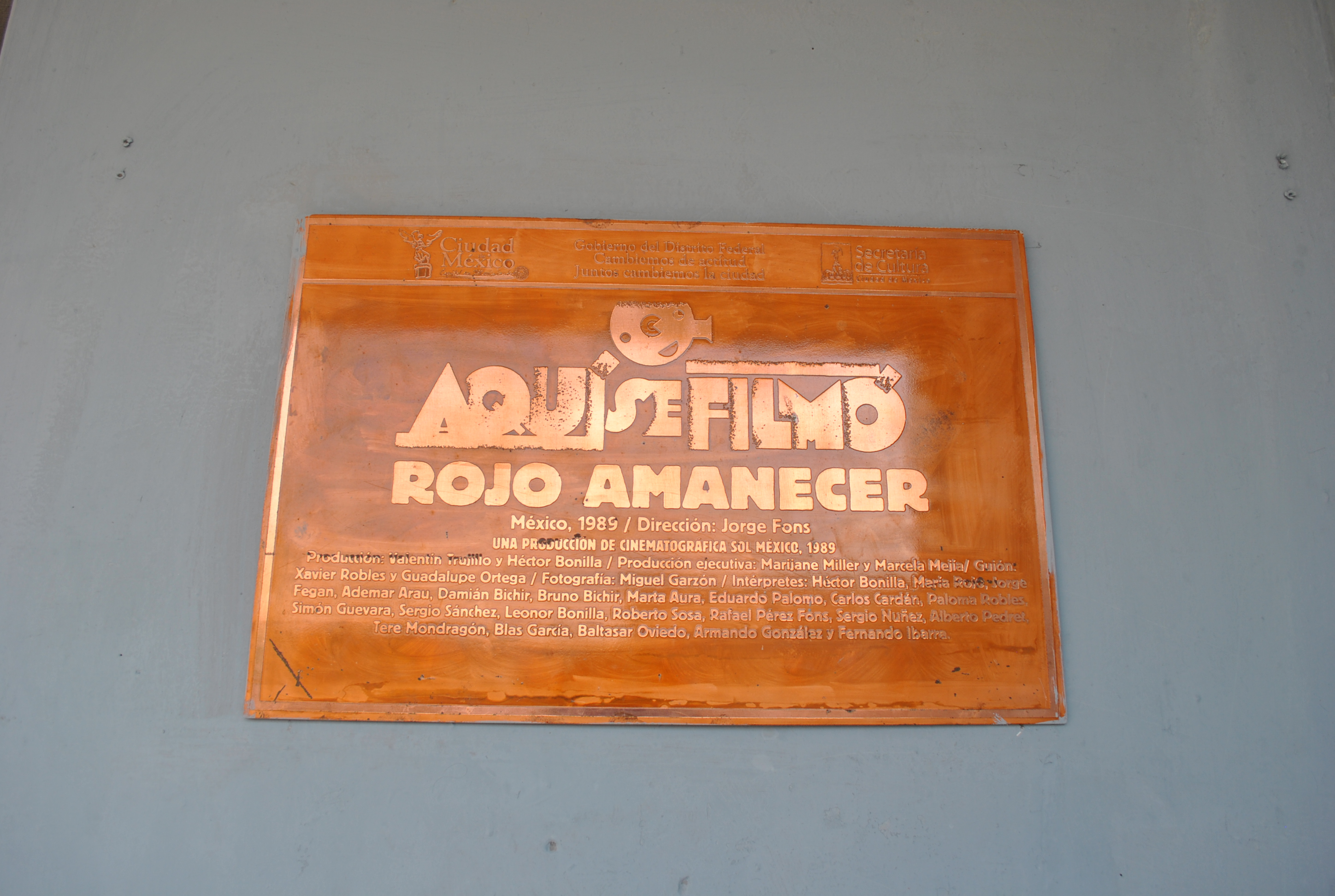
Plaque in the Chihuahua building of Tlatelolco indicating the filming of the movie.

It is Wednesday, October 2, 1968, and a middle-class Mexican family is about to start the day. At breakfast, the older brothers, Jorge (Demián Bichir) and Sergio (Bruno Bichir) argue with their father Humberto (Héctor Bonilla). The boys are studying at the university and their father works at the Departamento del Distrito Federal (Mexico City's local Government). The argument begins when the father complains that the boys have long hair. The argument escalates and then they begin to argue that what the boys are doing is wrong, and that "no one should question the government". The boys say that the autonomy of the university was violated and that the government does things against the constitution. Their grandfather Roque (Jorge Fegan) (who fought the Mexican Revolution), says that "If they were on a real revolution, they would be executed". The younger siblings Carlos (Ademar Arau) and Graciela (Estela Robles), who study primary and secondary school, barely understand what the argument is all about, because of their young age. The boys then talk about the injustice of the government. Their prime example is the occupation of the U.N.A.M. and that some students hid in the bathroom, and their corpses were found the day before (October 1). The mother, Alicia (María Rojo) tries to calm down the situation and tells the boys to "come early and cut their hair". The boys jokingly state that Miguel Hidalgo had long hair, then leave.

The day continues normally and then, while cooking, Alicia and Graciela argue about what the boys are doing. Graciela says that her mother is "out of style", then says that she would like to continue studying, to which her mother replies that she will end up being a homemaker anyway. Carlos is getting ready for school while listening to the Beatles, his grandfather complains that "they're too loud" and turns the radio off. Humberto tries to call his wife and tells her that "something big is about to happen and that he is worried", but before he can continue the phone dies. Alicia asks Graciela to go to the neighbor's apartment and try to call her father. Graciela does so and finds out that the neighbor's phone is dead. She returns and says that the phones do not work, "neither ours, nor the neighbor's, nor the one in the corner". Sometime later, the light goes out as well. Don Roque goes to the bottom floor and changes the fuse. He bumps into the neighbor on the way and they both change fuses. They then try to turn on the light and discover that the light got cut out. Don Roque then returns to the apartment and tells Alicia that the light does not work. They both worry and carry on with their day. Carlos returns from school. He tells his mother that he asked the teacher whether what his brothers said was true, and says the teacher confirmed it. He then goes outside to the building's hall to play with his toy soldiers with his grandfather. As they are playing, suspicious men with sniper rifles and white handkerchiefs in their left hands try to take a look through an opening on the hall. They find it "inappropriate" and go to upstairs floors. The two return to the apartment and Don Roque talks with his daughter about the military presence and the snipers at the roof of each building. Why? She asks. The answer is very simple: because they are prepared for something big. Alicia starts sewing something, Carlos does his homework and Don Roque tries to repair a watch.

At the square outside, a crowd begins to gather. A student meeting is taking place. Carlos and Graciela watch the crowd and estimate more than 10,000 present. Graciela then goes to a friend's house to do her homework. After half an hour, the meeting is interrupted as red and green flares soar across the sky. Carlos sees this, excited, and tells his mom. Alicia peeks through the window and sees that the students are being slaughtered. Don Roque tells them to get away from the window and to hide in his room. As they do so, two bullets pierce the window. After some time, Don Roque tries to pick up Graciela, but before he does, he hears a sound. "Tanks!" he exclaims. Then it starts to rain. After some time, there are sounds from outside. The door opens and Serigio and Jorge (whose glasses got broken while he was running) arrive, along with some mates. One of them, Luis (Eduardo Palomo), is wounded. Alicia tries to heal him, but he is bleeding badly. The shooting goes on and stops. During that time, the soaked students begin to trade stories. One of them says that he was on the building's third floor balcony, where the speech was being given, and said that armed people dressed as civilians yelled "Olimpia Battalion! Nobody move!". Another one says that he was leaving when the shooting started. The brothers say that the speaker yelled to the crowd "not to fall on provocations". Luis says that he was from the "Poli" (Instituto Politécnico Nacional) and was running with the crowd when he felt pain in his elbow, then found out he was shot, then afterwards lost his little sister. Another one claims that two dead children no older than 10 ended up on top of each other. A female student claims she saw the Plaza full of shoes. The students peek through the pierced window and see "nothing but shadows" (meaning the corpses lying on the Plaza are being lifted).

Don Roque arrives with Graciela and some soldiers, who are in the search for students. Don Roque says that he was a captain in the Revolution and searches for his papers. As he does so, the snipers come from upstairs holding three blood-soaked students. They punch them and then are told to "take them with the others". Don Roque comes back and gives his papers to the soldier, who tells them not to open to anyone. The old man goes back inside and says that the students were arrested and sent to military trucks, as well as that there were garbage trucks and firemen outside. Graciela says that they had to take the stairs and saw the elevator's doors pierced by bullets. Her mother says that it was practically impossible since they were "made of thick steel". The female student, who held the propaganda money, talks with Alicia. Alicia keeps the money on a jar until "things get calm", then says that the girl's parents would be worried, but the girl does not think so. Alicia says that it was impossible, "by this time, the whole country is already aware of what happened here", but the girl answers that "not everything that the news says is true, and not everything that happens makes it into the news as well". She goes into the bathroom to dry her soaked hair, when Graciela confronts her telling her "to be a woman and not to be in Men Things", to which the student replies "this is a matter of both men and women". Humberto calls and tells the family not to open to anyone. In a short time, some boys call their houses to assure their families they're OK. A second shooting ensues and the lights are shut down. The group sleeps and a woman starts crying outside looking for her son "Toño". The students awake and ask if anyone is named Toño. None of them is named like so. Finally, the lights come back on and Humberto arrives. He says that "it was really hard to get past the security". He also says that ambulances were on the surrounding area of the square, but none of them seemed to take the wounded to hospitals and that students were stripped and pushed to the bottom floor's elevator walls. One of the students asks whether they were being beaten up. Humberto confirms this harshly. They then turn the T.V. on and the local news says that the shooting took place because "student snipers on the nearby buildings fired at the army, which was sent to support the police". One of the students says the obvious: the government controls the local news as well, confirming the female student's claims. The group then goes to sleep, while the students plan their escape: the next day they'll "leave the house one by one".

At the eerie sights of morning, the snipers bang on the door. After a harsh awakening, the students hide in the bathroom and one of them tells Humberto not to open. Carlos hides under his bed and the boys pretend to be asleep. Humberto asks who they are, but the snipers insist on opening. Humberto opens and the snipers act fiercely, pointing their guns at everyone. Humberto tells them of his position at the government, but they don't seem to care. They force everyone out of their beds and discover the boys' room full of leftist propaganda: "The Communist Manifesto" and a Che Guevara poster on their wall. They are forced to get out of their room and are asked if they were in on the meeting. Jorge answers, but Sergio does not and is pistol-whipped. They discover the bathroom is locked and Don Roque says Carlos is inside because he's scared. They then inspect the apartment because of the boys' leftist propaganda and find the blood-stained sheet on which Luis laid. Then they threaten to kill Humberto at gunpoint if the bathroom door does not open. Sergio, his mouth still full of blood, begs his mates to open the door. One of the snipers, meanwhile, shoots the doorknob of the bathroom and force everyone to leave. Some students stay put, while a student and the girl try to escape. Both are shot by the snipers. Other students also shout and are killed. A fight ensues. Jorge, Don Roque and Humberto try to overpower the snipers as Sergio and Graciela escape. The snipers win and shoot everyone. They then run to the hall to search for Sergio and Graciela. Two gunshots are heard. Carlos is the sole survivor as he gets out of his bed and sees the corpses in the hall. He starts to cry and goes barefoot down the blood-stained stairs. He sees his brother's corpse on the stairs with two bullet holes on his chest, then keeps walking down and finds his sister dead in at the foot of some stairs. He manages to get to the bullet-hit bottom floor and sees two soldiers, while in the background a government janitor (barrendero) sweeps the floor, which contains student propaganda, finally the film ends.

== Production and release ==
Though the film later proved to be successful, it was produced with a low budget and was filmed inside a warehouse with few shots from outside the apartment. This was due in large part to the stigmatization of the theme of the film, as the government maintained a strict stance.

The release of Rojo Amanecer suffered delay until 1990. The writer of the film, Xavier Robles, appealed to the General Society of Writers in Mexico, which in turn brought an injunction against the Department of Cinematography. Officials argued that it was all just a simple delay for bureaucratic reasons, the filmmakers alleged that they were trying to censor the movie. The excuse used to delay the film was that it contained scenes of the Mexican army and was the reason that the directors had to cut two scenes in which soldiers appear: the final scene, in which two soldiers are patrolling the ground floor of the Chihuahua, and a scene about halfway through the film, in which two soldiers ask to look inside the apartment in search of students.

== Reception ==
The film won a total of 11 awards most of the Silver Ariel awards in 1991 and 1 nomination.

== See also ==
- An Unknown Enemy (2018 TV series focusing on the same subject, from the perspective of an Intelligence agency)
- Batallón Olimpia
