= Marcelino Iñurreta de la Fuente =

Mexican colonel and politician

Brigadier General Marcelino Iñurreta de la Fuente (born in Cunduacán, Tabasco, 29 June 1901) served as the first director of the Dirección Federal de Seguridad (DFS), Mexico's national intelligence agency, from 9 October 1947 to 10 December 1952.

After working as a police officer in Mexico City, Iñurreta served as a Federal Deputy from 1943 to 1946 and a Senator from Tabasco from 1952 to 1958.

== Director of Federal de Seguridad ==
Under Iñurreta, the DFS worked with the Attorney General's Office (PGR) and the Mexican military, which initiated the 'Gran Campaña' to eradicate the narcotics trade, particularly marijuana and opium. DFS established relationships with the U.S. Federal Bureau of Investigation and the Central Intelligence Agency from its inception, fighting communist subversives and left-wing political activists. In 1947, FBI instructors taught nine DFS agents skills like wiretapping, which was employed against domestic dissidents, most notably in the suppression of the Mexican Railway Workers Union in October 1948. DFS spied on the unregistered Partido Comunista Mexicano, Socieded Amigos de Wallace, and Partido Popular, as well as the movements of suspected American communists like Gordon Kahn, Mary Oppen, and Morton Sobell. Iñurreta reported on their activities to presidential secretary Rogelio de la Selva. The agency was also responsible for protecting the president.

In 1949, the CIA opened a station in Mexico City, placing E. Howard Hunt in charge as OPC Station Chief. According to Hunt, the CIA's new presence was initially obstructed by the FBI. Later on, Hunt helped lay the framework for Operation PBFortune, later renamed Operation PBSuccess, the successful covert operation to overthrow Jacobo Árbenz, the president of Guatemala. State Department and U.S. Army officials were wary of working with the DFS because of evidence that leading DFS personnel were personally engaged in narcotics trafficking. While the CIA did not dismiss their concerns, "competent and capable" DFS agents were preferred partners over other Mexican agencies.

== Corruption ==
A month before the DFS was established, the U.S. State Department concluded that Iñurreta and his principal deputies, Lieutenant Colonel Juan Ramón Gurrola and Colonel Manuel Magoral, were all involved in the illegal drug trade and that they were using intelligence from the U.S. government to eliminate rival drug traffickers. Colonel Carlos I. Serrano, who advised President Miguel Alemán Valdés to create the DFS, was also involved in the drug trade. Mexico's Federal Health Department, which was in charge of counter-narcotics operations prior to 1947, warned of internal corruption a decade earlier. U.S. Lieutenant Colonel Maurice C. Holden, the assistant U.S. military attache in Mexico, described the DFS under Iñurreta as "nothing but a Gestapo organization under another name" in a report to Secretary of State.
