= National Intelligence Centre (Mexico) =

Mexican intelligence and national security agency

- Centro Nacional de Inteligencia
- Official Seal of the CNI

Agency overview
- Formed: December 1, 2018; 7 years ago
- Preceding agency: Centro de Investigación y Seguridad Nacional (1989-2018)
- Headquarters: Camino Real a Contreras No. 35, Col. La Concepción, Magdalena Contreras, Ciudad de México; 19°18′14″N 99°14′10″W
- Employees: Classified (estimated around 3,600)
- Annual budget: 2 813 446 355 pesos (2023)
- Agency executive: Audomaro Martínez Zapata, General Director
- Parent department: Secretariat of Security and Citizen Protection
- Website: www.gob.mx/cni

The Centro Nacional de Inteligencia (CNI) is a Mexican intelligence agency administered by the Secretariat of Security and Citizen Protection.

The CNI replaced the Centro de Investigación y Seguridad Nacional (CISEN) in December 2018 at the start of the administration of President Andrés Manuel López Obrador. The CNI is the primary civilian intelligence service in Mexico.

Formally, the agency is charged with intelligence operations as they pertain to national security, which contribute to the preservation of the Mexican State's integrity, stability, and permanence.

== History ==
=== Fundation and Dissolution of CISEN ===
Before the creation of the CNI, the top Mexican intelligence agency was CISEN, created on February 13, 1989, to replace the Dirección General de Investigación y Seguridad Nacional (DGISN), which assumed its role following the dissolution of the controversial Dirección Federal de Seguridad (DFS) and the Dirección General de Investigaciones Políticas y Sociales (DGIPS). CISEN was the principal intelligence agency of the Secretariat of the Interior (Spanish: Secretaría de Gobernación, SEGOB). The agency was formally charged with generating strategic, tactical, and operative intelligence to ensure the integrity, stability, and permanence of the Mexican state. Article 19 of the National Security Act defined the scope and responsibilities of CISEN. The 1994 Zapatista uprising in Chiapas played a formative role in shaping the scope of the agency's objectives and lead to a significant increase in intelligence operations against all sectors of Mexican society. From its inception, the agency received training and equipment from the Israeli intelligence agency Mossad. CISEN acquired the Israeli spyware Pegasus during the presidency of Enrique Peña Nieto. The spyware was used by the Peña Nieto administration to spy on journalists, human rights activists, and political opponents, including dozens of associates of Andrés Manuel López Obrador in the run-up to his presidential election victory in 2018. Then-Secretary of the Interior Miguel Ángel Osorio Chong publicly denied CISEN's purchase of Pegasus; however, in May 2020 the Secretariat of Security and Civilian Protection (Spanish: Secretaría de Seguridad y Protección Ciudadana, SSPC) confirmed the acquisition of the spyware by CISEN.

==== Dissolution ====
Before taking office in 2018, President López Obrador had been critical of CISEN's opacity in its operations and practices, which included wiretapping and surveillance of political adversaries and ideological dissidents. This prompted López Obrador to dissolve CISEN and replace the agency with the Centro Nacional de Inteligencia (CNI). Although mostly regarded as a rebrand (CNI maintains the same faculties, internal structure, and the majority of CISEN personnel), one notable structural change was its placement under the control of the reinstated Secretariat of Security and Civilian Protection. In July 2021, López Obrador announced that all CISEN files would be declassified and made available for public examination at the Archivo General de la Nación.

=== Creation of CNI ===
The Centro Nacional de Inteligencia (CNI) was created on November 30, 2018, following reforms to the Organic Law of the Federal Public Administration. The agency maintains the functions established for CISEN in Article 19 of the National Security Law. Audomaro Martínez Zapata was named director of the CNI on December 1, 2018.

== Directors of CISEN ==
- (1989–1990): Jorge Carrillo Olea
- (1990–1993): Fernando del Villar Moreno
- (1993–1994): Eduardo Pontones Chico
- (1994–1999): Jorge Enrique Tello Peón
- (1999–2000): Alejandro Alegre Rabiela
- (2000–2005): Eduardo Medina-Mora Icaza
- (2005–2006): Jaime Domingo López Buitrón (1st term)
- (2006–2011): Guillermo Valdés Castellanos
- (2011): Alejandro Poiré Romero (temporary)
- (2011–2012): Jaime Domingo López Buitrón (2nd term)
- (2012–2018): Eugenio Ímaz Gispert
- (2018–2019): Alberto Bazbaz

== Directors of CNI ==
- (2019): Audomaro Martínez Zapata
