= Dirección Federal de Seguridad =

Former Mexican intelligence agency

Federal Security Directorate
- Dirección Federal de Seguridad
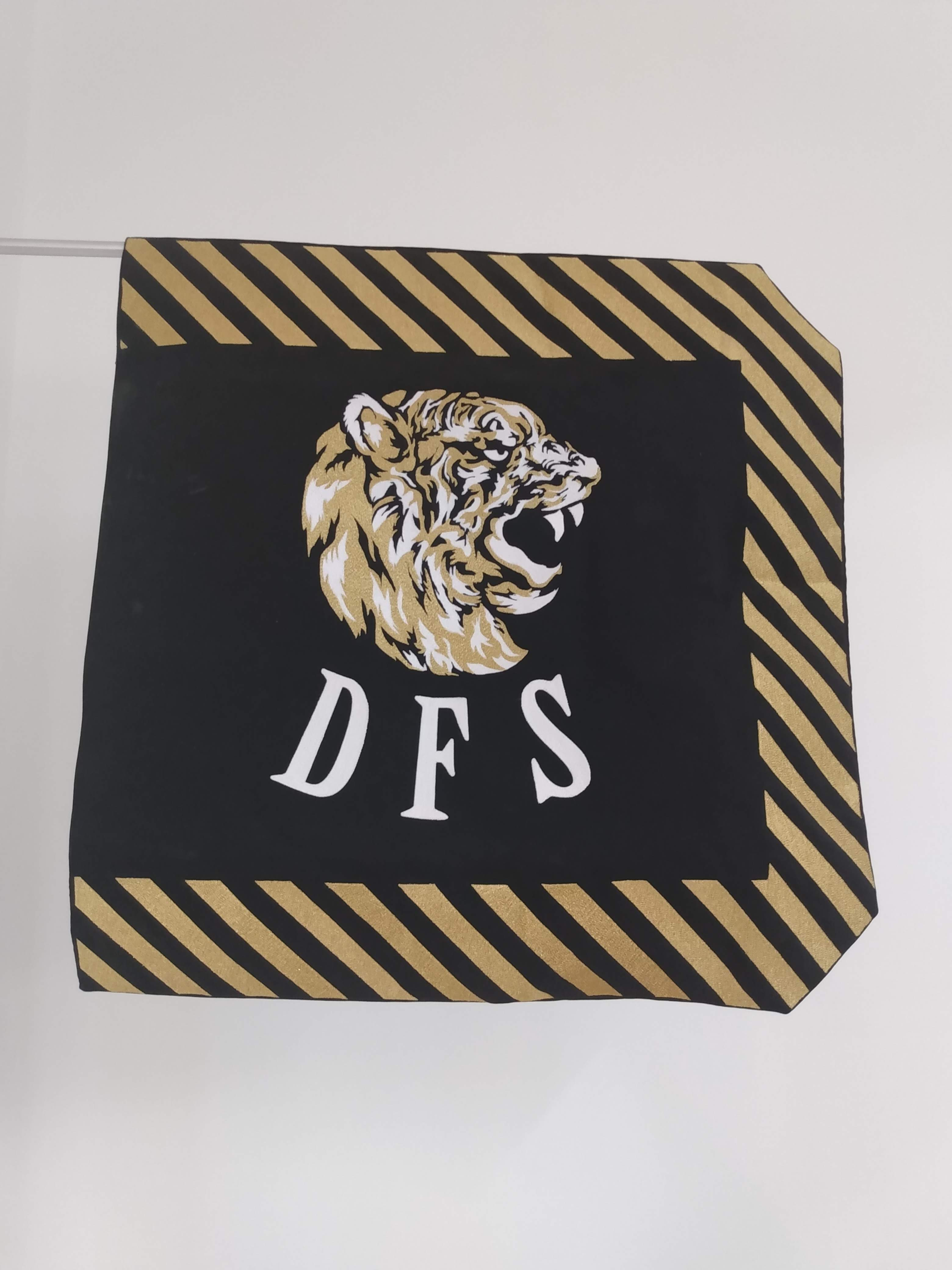
- Flag and logo of the DFS

Agency overview
- Formed: 1947
- Preceding agency: Departamento de Investigación Política y Social (DIPS)
- Dissolved: November 29, 1985
- Superseding agency: Dirección de Investigación y Seguridad Nacional
- Jurisdiction: Mexican Government
- Headquarters: Distrito Federal, México
- Parent department: Secretariat of Governance
- Parent agency: CIA

The Dirección Federal de Seguridad ('Federal Security Directorate', DFS), known commonly as the "secret police", was the Mexican intelligence agency commanded by the Secretariat of Governance created in 1947 by the president Miguel Alemán Valdés, with the assistance of U.S. intelligence agencies (namely the CIA) as part of the Truman Doctrine of Soviet Containment during the Cold War, with the official duty of preserving the internal stability of Mexico against all forms of subversion and terrorist threats.

The agency was used by the Mexican government to spy political opposition and commit human rights violations during what is called the Mexican Dirty War. It was dissolved in 1985 following the uncovering of its involvement in the torture and murder of Enrique "Kiki" Camarena, succeeded by the General Directorate of Investigation and National Security (Dirección General de Investigación y Seguridad Nacional), which later was renamed as the National Security and Investigation Centre (Centro de Investigación y Seguridad Nacional, CISEN) in 1989. In 2018 it became the National Intelligence Centre (Centro Nacional de Inteligencia, CNI).

== Structure ==
A big part of its actions were supervised or directly ordered by the CIA, as it had the same objective of stopping and dismantling insurgent, communist, socialist and student movements that threatened "against the stability of the country", all as part of the LITEMPO program, which had in its members high commanders of the DFS and the Mexican army, as well as several presidents of Mexico during the Cold War. With the direct correspondence of Winston Scott, the chief CIA station in Mexico, who served as proconsul in the Federal District.

The ranks were divided as the director, two sub-directorates and the general coordinator.

=== Offices ===
Officially, the headquarters were located on Circular de Morelia 8, Colonia Roma Norte, Cuauhtémoc, Ciudad de México, but they operated a significant portion of their operations in an extraofficial fashion on Avenicda de la República 20, Colonia Tabacalera, Cuauhtémoc, Ciudad de México, in front of the Monument to the Revolution.

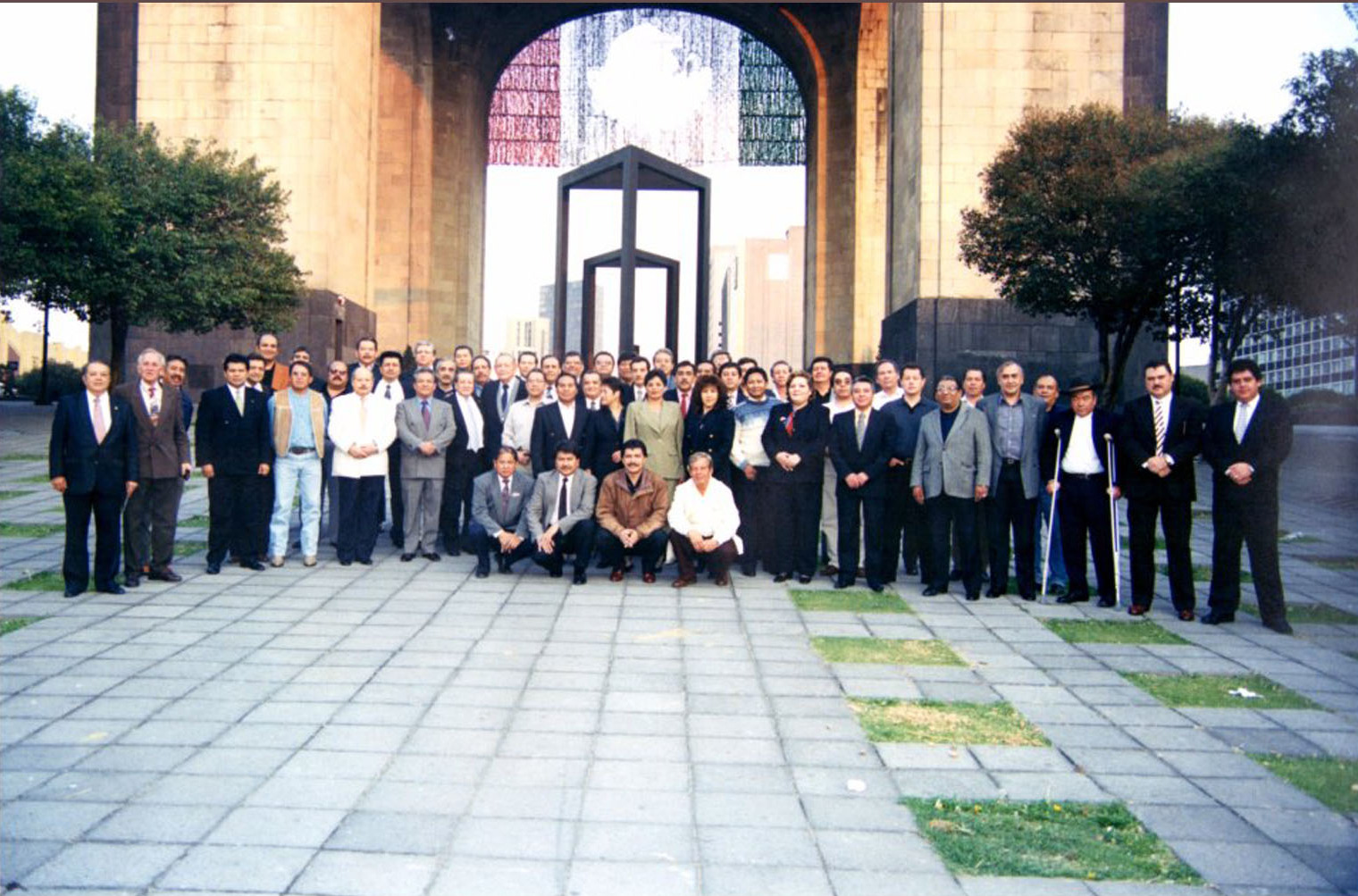
Directives and agents of the Federal Security Directorate in front of the Monument to the Revolution in 1978.

On Avenida República 20 there was a secret entrance for the agents on Ignacio Ramírez street, which was constantly surveilled by agents and was only accessed through a password, while the main entrance was for the general public. The premises included a gym, full bathrooms, a café, an internal bank to do interest-free loans, a barbershop, a payment office, an internal grocery shop with prices lower than the public's, a library and academical courses to be educated in law, politics, research, redaction, intelligence and counterintelligence. It also included a shooting gallery so they could learn how to shoot and the theoretical aspect of ballistics and mechanics of the weapons used. They were trained to shoot pistols of caliber .45, 9mm, .38 Super, Israeli submachine guns like the Uzi 9mm, AR-15 rifles, shotguns, M1 Garands .30 and rifles caliber .35.

The building located on Circular de Morelia 8 functioned as an illegal detention centre used for temporary or permanent disappearances. The basement was used to tag and identify the detainees, and the upper ones to kidnap or torture them. It was only accessible by the main entrance being accompanied by a DFS agent or coerced verbally or physically by an authority. The place was as surveilled as the other one 24/7 and was impossible to take a picture of the building. Once the people were taken here, they were confronted with one of two possibilities: Being taken to Campo Militar Número 1 or another black-site, where they would disappear completely, or taken to the Procuraduría del Distrito Federal (the State's Prosecutors Office) to then be sent to Prison, Prisión de Lecumberri. It is unknown how many militants disappeared inside this building, of whose only bloody handprints rest on the walls. On 1978 it stopped being the HQ for the DFS.

=== Branches ===
==== Administrative Sub-directorate ====
It was the responsible of the personnel, archive and internal affairs departments, as well as the general services of the directorate. It supervised the information processing and archival. This branch was in charge of the internship and order inside the DFS. Inside this branch they would be trained of the directorate's philosophy, law and methods. The archive held files since the creation of the office in 1947 and microfilm archival. General services managed and provided the services of an armory of 2.500 guns, vehicles, ambulance, criminalistics lab, two full buses for intel operations and two planes.

==== Federal Security Director ====
This person the overseer of the Directorate through the Coordinator Committee, integrated by the heads of the 13 services and departments. It was in charge of supervising all investigations of the Internal Affairs Department and acted accordingly. Under him, rested the General Coordinator, who tethered the different departments so they could function at the biggest efficiency, directly under his command worked seven internal departments who helped coordinate the directorate's departments, surveil and secure the DFS' building, as well as one sub-department being tasked with researching crimes committed by government officials.

==== Operative Sub-directorate ====
The biggest division of the entire agency. It was in charge of capturing political, economic and social intelligence of the Metropolitan Area and some other states, as well as managing all the agents deployed overt or undercover. It had 6 sub-departments: One for the processing of information and typing; another for direct surveillance of any subversive or opposittion group, mainly on Mexico City and the State of Mexico, but they were also in touch with every context of the country and even had a secret office in every airport; one specially devoted to the surveillance of each of the states, with 56 agents abroad, and a single office to report to for every one of the 32 states; the criminalistics lab; photography lab; law department; operations department, which coordinated every mission on all the states.

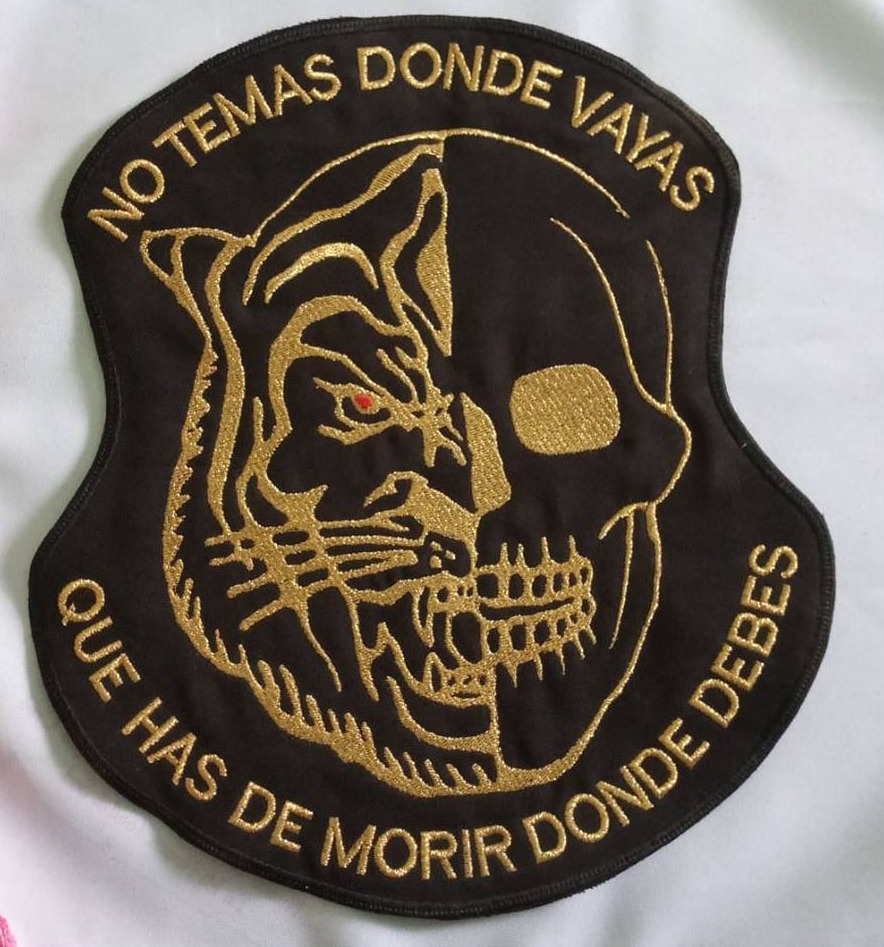
DFS patch with the slogan that reads: "Do not fear where you go, for you must die where you must."

===== Brigada Blanca =====
The last of its sub-departments was the most important after its creation on 1976, La Brigada Blanca (the White Brigade) which was a paramilitary unit integrated by agents, policemen and soldiers dedicated specifically to eliminate the Liga Comunista 23 de Septiembre, a Marxist–Leninist coalition formed by syndicalists, unionists, farmers and students who were one of the most organized guerrilla groups of the epoch. Created after the LC23S made its own "Brigada Roja" (Red Brigade).

==== Audiovisual Information Services ====
They were in charge of any screenings, elaboration of any audiovisual material captured by the Photography Department. They were also in charge of monitoring and processing all the media received from any other state and press, as well as the close-circuit camera system that was recorded in VHS tapes.

==== Clandestine Operations Department aka Special C-047 ====
Also known as "Federal Services" or "Special Operations Group", was created in November 1965, by Miguel Nazar Haro after receiving counter-insurgence preparation by the CIA, and the events of the Cuartel de Madera Assault. With the official name "Special Investigations Group", codenamed C-047, in honor of the year the agency was created, this department was dedicated to spy the intellectual elites, social and intellectual leaders, and refugees from the Latin-American dictatorships that were being placed by the CIA at the time and were looking for political asylum in the country, every conflict presented by these population was referred to the Brigada Blanca or the Migration Department in the government. Supposedly the agency's best-trained team.

Everything made by this division was classified, being physically isolated inside the same building. It worked through two sections, the intelligence, specialized in collecting political, economic, social and military information about all the countries worldwide that were of national interest, because of Mexico's importance in the global stage; and the counterintelligence one, that used the intelligence's side data to look for social movements in the country that come from these groups of interest, using diverse methods for infiltration and surveillance to collect the adequate information. This department also oversaw the political refugees and general control of foreigners, as well as their actions and behaviours. This department was commanded by the Director of the DFS.

Among its operations, the following stand out: Thwarting the formation of an armed group by the Spaniard socialist journalist Victor Rico Galán; the surveillance of Julio Cortazar, Julio Scherer and Gabriel García Márquez; the torture and murder of Enrique Camarena; the murder of Manuel Buendía, monitoring the entrance and exit of tourists with destination or origin of Cuba; monitoring the activities of the palestinian refugees that went to Mexico after the Nakba and Six Day War; among others.

It also had four other sub-sections: The electronics, where bugging and secret photography were planned; the "lecar", specialized in encrypting and decrypting messages, including those in another languages; the propaganda and conterpropaganda, that analyzed and made efforts to make an inverse equivalent propaganda to the ones being made by subversive groups; the international issues, that relayed classified information coming from another countries.

==== Anthropometric Department ====
A group of experts in politics, economics and sociology whose mission was to do predictions on events and the psychological and social context of the Mexican society, to catalogue its risk for the agency and act accordingly.

==== Political, economic and social studies Department ====
Like the Anthropometric Department, it was a group of experts in the social sciences who were tasked with cataloging and analyzing the information captured and processed by the other departments.

== Symbology ==
The main emblem and identity of the DFS was around the tiger, the reason being:

"The tiger is a powerful animal that does not flee danger, attacks upfront, prefers to act in silence and observes the other beings that cannot see it, it is intuitive and smart, fast and secure, careful and witful; it is not arrogant like the lion, nor hurts for pleasure like the leopard. That is how the agent of the Federal Security Directory agent has to be." "The qualities that we have mentioned about our emblem, have become an obligation for us,"

It also had an official anthem, with the lyrics and melody composed by Miguel A. Galindo Rangel:

Mi estandarte [s]iempre en alto
se oyen voces de hermandad
de tu nombre brota un canto federal de seguridad

Es un tigre tu emblema
que en alerta siempre está
y tu nombre una diadema de mi patria en libertad

Pasen lista los valientes que dormidos solo están
y no se han puerto
y están presentes cumpliendo con lealtad.

Canten, canten; compañeros
nuestro lema la verdad con honor
justi[ci]as proteger la libertad

Año del cuarenta y siete nació
nuestra dirección una cuna de valientes
que protegen la nación
y lo digo con cariño,
con justias y con verdad de mi patria
no me olvido federal de seguridad.

== History ==
On 1947, during the government of Miguel Alemán Valdés, and given the appearances of subversive groups around the country, as well as the influence by the United States through the Truman Doctrine to antagonize the sympathy towards the USSR and its allies, the DIPS disappeared and in its place the Dirección Federal de Seguridad was founded, with the general Marcelino Iñurreta de la Fuente on charge. Its initial functions were to take care of the wellness of the president and his family; according to one of the first audiovisual files of the agency, it stablishes its function as a "policing institution that, with the material and human elements it has, it must be one considered one of the best agencies of its type in the world". But with time it was flipped into doing political espionage, that consisted in suffocating the opposers to the regime and locate and detain its main leaders.

By the 1960s it had already consolidated itself as the agency that was designated to monitor all growing social and student movements of the epoch, with special interest on what happened inside the UNAM, infiltrating to consolidate the internal official narratives against the students.

After 1973, its main enemy would be the Liga Comunista 23 de Septiembre (Communist League September 23), given its level of organization and relevance caused by its terrorist acts such as: The attempted kidnapping of Eugenio Garza Sada, the attempted kidnapping of Margarita López Portillo, an insurrection similar to the Cuartel de Madera Assault but in Culiacán, named "Operation Sky Assault", and the prison break of incarcerated guerrilla members in the Oblatos prison in Guadalajara, Jalisco, among others; creating the Brigada Blanca to fully deal with capturing and eliminating its members.

=== Dirty War ===
In México, during the Cold War, the DFS in conjunction with the Mexican Armed Forces, were responsible of illegal detentions, forced disappearances, sabotage, burglary, extrajudicial execution, torture and State terrorism. At least 347 complaints were received by the United Nations related to Mexican state crimes from 1960 to 1980. The Eureka! Committee, formed by family members of the missing persons, reports that the number of people whose whereabouts are unknown is 557 from 1997 to 2001. Sergio Aguayo Quezada, an academic who personally researched within some of the files inside the DFS, reports 22 disappearances and 12 kidnappings between 1970 and 1980.

==== La Alameda Massacre ====
On July 7, 1952, hours after the 1952 federal elections that presented plenty of irregularities, several people protested electoral fraud being done to the leader of the FPPM coalition, Miguel Henríquez Guzmán, on the Alameda Central, Mexico City, following the results and the PRI's Adolfo Ruiz Cortines' victory. Local Armed Forces, with help of the DFS, violently repressed those who assisted the protest, killing more than 200 people who were looking for political freedom and representation within their country.

==== Killing of Rubén Jaramillo ====
Rubén Jaramillo Méndez was a guerrilla member of the revolution and politician representative of the farmer social movement from the 1940s until the 1960, when he was assassinated on May 23, 1962. The DFS followed the direct orders of the president, Adolfo López Mateos, who murdered him alongside the Policía Judicial and the Mexican Army.

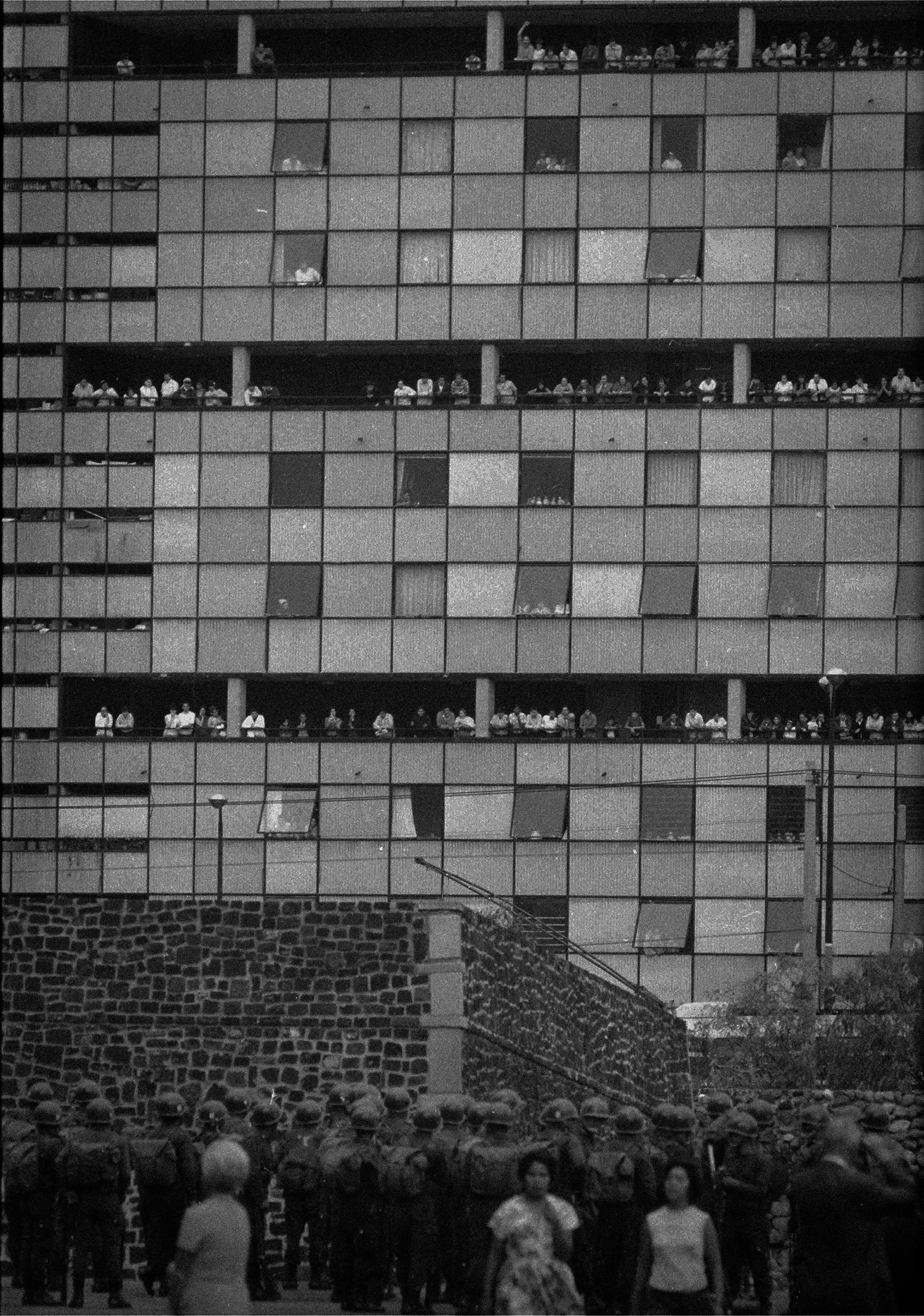
Mexican army and students before the massacre.

==== Tlatelolco Massacre ====
The DFS played a key role in the events occurred before and during the October 2, 1968, Tlatelolco Massacre, scouting intel about the students, their plans and infiltrating within their environments to shape their actions.

In a similar fashion, agents of the Directorate were inside the student movilizations, wearing the distinctive white glove to lose themselves among the population, but still being able to recognize one another. Several eye-witnesses state that they were the ones to open fire towards the army and provoke them into firing into the protesting crowds in the first place.

Following the events, several guerrilla groups formed, looking to put in place an insurgent campaign, among the which stand out the LC23S, GPG, PdlP, LCA, FLN, FRAP, FAR, ACNR and MAR, that set foot for the United States to further pressure and fund the DFS to continue the counterinsurgency campaign against any political opposition, more-so to those who represented any communist sentiment.

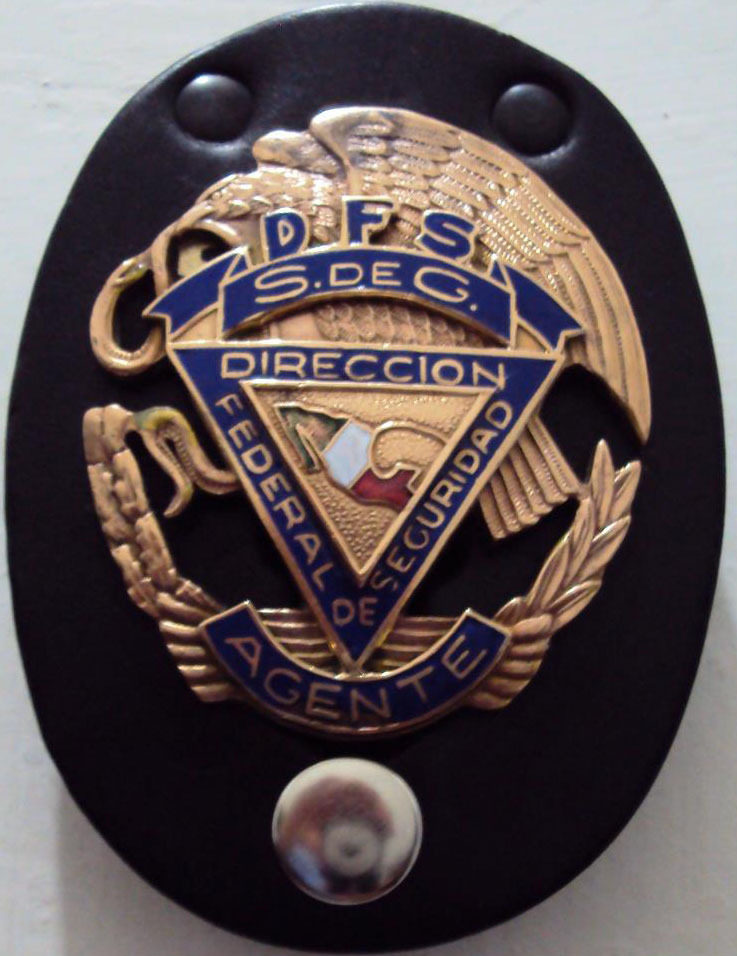
60s and 70s DFS Agent ID Badge,"The Tray"

==== The Halconazo ====
Same as in Tlatelolco, by June 10, 1971, the agency had every bit of information regarding the protesters and attack in a similar way, targeting any survivors of the October 2 attacks to hunt them down.

During the student protest done to support the Universidad Autónoma de Nuevo León and its fight for autonomy, agents of the DFS, in tandem with the Halcones, Mexico City's Police, Grenadiers, Policía Federal de Caminos, the Estado Mayor Presidencial (Mexican Secret Service) and the Mexican Army, killed around 225 students and injured hundreds more.

==== Death flights ====
It refers to a State terrorism tactic used in all of Latin America during Operation Condor to disappear guerrilla members, activists and journalists associated with the left wing. In Mexico, it was used between 1971 and 1980, specifically in Base Aérea Militar N.º 7 Pie de la Cuesta, Acapulco, where members of the Movimiento de Acción Revolucionaria (MAR), Fuerzas Armadas Revolucionarias (FAR), the Liga Comunista 23 de Septiembre (LC23S), Party of the Poor and the Mexican Communist Party were taken, from Guerrero, Oaxaca, Tlaxcala, Puebla, Hidalgo, Nuevo León, Chihuahua or Mexico City and needed to be taken care of.

The kidnapped were executed, shot in the head at close distance, bagged, taken to a plane en route to Oaxaca and during the flight, they were thrown into the ocean.

==== Operation Condor ====
Operation Condor in Latin America was the way to plant anti-communist narratives by means of State terrorism in the entirety of Central and South America, but in Mexico, the plan was different. Between 1975 and 1985, Operation Condor was the name of an operation in the DFS, to form a monopoly in the drug trafficking market inside the country so the government could control it, coercing, manipulating and murdering the most influential Jefes de Plaza (Plaza Heads) within the Marihuanna plantation Golden Triangle, to form the first mexican drug "Cartel", Guadalajara Cartel. Later incorporating the sell of Cocaine with help of the Cali Cartel.

This was done under supervision of the CIA and the actions of the DFS to follow the US' newly created narrative of the War on drugs; looking to create a perpetual enemy in the mexican society to excuse militarization and espionage actions done by the mexican government or by foreign agents.

These actions and narratives lead the country's way to this day.

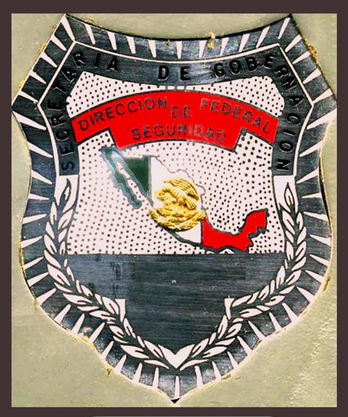
80s DFS Agent ID Badge.

==== Contras training for the CIA ====
Between 1981 and 1984, approximately, the CIA, with help of the DFS, used Rafael Caro Quintero's ranches to train the Nicaraguan contras for the Sandinista revolution. This information would fall onto the hands of Manuel Buendía, who would decide to investigate it and be the reason of his death by the DFS.

==== Killing of Manuel Buendía ====
Manuel Buendía was a mexican journalist who was murdered on May 30, 1984, by four bullet impacts. The DFS has been proven to be behind this attack. Aguayo Quezada assures Buendía had received a classified document containing information pertaining the nexus between José Antonio Zorrilla Pérez, then head of the DFS, and the Guadalajara Cartel. In his book "La Charola" he explains that:

The most helped interpretation is that Buendía was preparing himself to denounce him and Zorrilla Pérez decided to stop him [...] A variant of this version is that Zorrilla didn't decide, rather he simply accepted, a confabulation of the determined commanders to eliminate the uncomfortable journalist.

The investigation that Buendía was working on, researched how Manuel Bartlett Díaz, Miguel Aldana Ibarra and Manuel Ibarra Herrera, ex-Secretary of Governance, ex-Commander of the Policía Federal Judicial and the ex-Director of the DFS, respectively, were working with the drug trafficking cartel.

It has been proposed that his killing was the first "narcopolitics murder" in Mexico.

Since then, until now, the agency has taken a rather obtuse stance regarding the case, with its now more modern successor, the National Intelligence Centre (CNI), refusing to declassify in its totality all the documents of his case, among many others. In some of the very few files released it has been found that the Mexico City's Prosecutor's Office had at least 130 suspects of being involved in the case, confirming that the reason of his murder was his journalistic work, as well as the identification of two bullets inside his body, being of .38 caliber or .357 Magnum, the latter of which being of only exclusive use by the Mexican Armed Forces, stated in Article 9, Fraction II of the Firearms and Explosives' Federal Law published in 1972.

==== Torture and execution of Enrique "Kiki" Camarena ====
During Operation Condor, Enrique "Kiki" Camarena, was a DEA agent that found out the DFS and CIA's plan to create a monopoly on drugs in Mexico with help of the DEA. Since he was not cleared to know this information, on February 8, 1985, he was kidnapped, tortured and, 36 hours later, executed by agents of those same agencies. All of which was recorded by the CIA.

=== Dissolution ===
It was formally dissolved on November 29, 1985, creating the General Directorate for National Security and Intelligence (DISEN), predecessor of the CISEN.

== Heads of the DFS ==
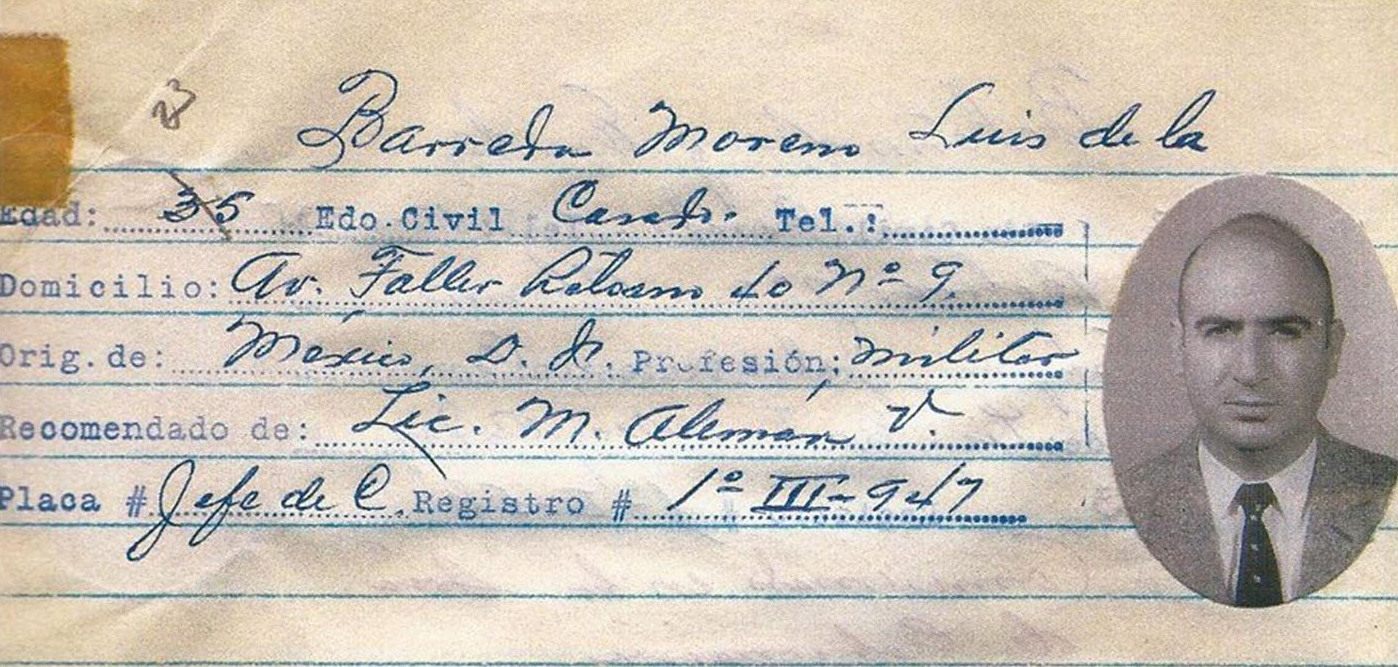
- Director Luis de la Barreda Moreno DFS ID
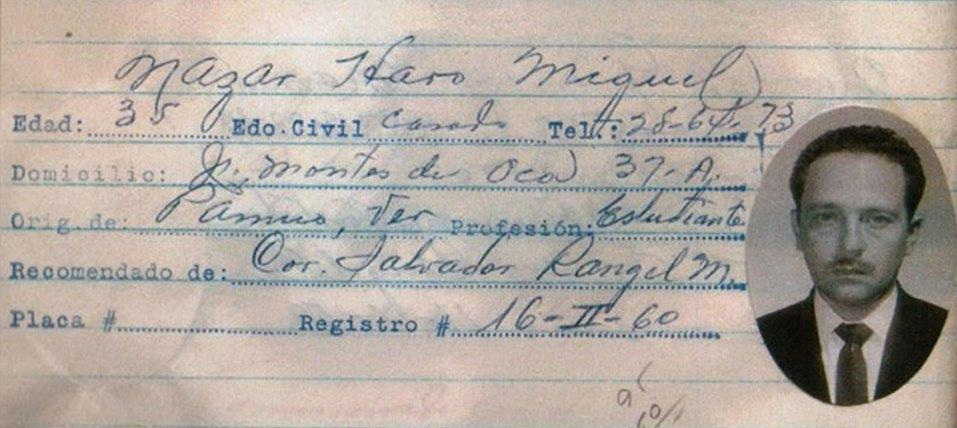
  Director Miguel Nazar Haro DFS ID
  (1947–1952) Lt.Col. Marcelino Inurreta
- (1952–1958) Col. Leandro Castillo-Venegas
- (1958–1959) LLB. Gilberto Suárez-Torres .
- (1959–1964) Col. Manuel Rangel-Escamilla
- (1965–1970) Cap. Fernando Gutiérrez Barrios
- (1970–1977) Cap. Luis de la Barreda
- (1977–1978) Mr. Javier García Paniagua
- (1978–1982) Lt.Col. Miguel Nazar Haro
- (1982–1985) José Antonio Zorrilla Pérez
- (1985) Cap. Pablo González-Ruelas

== Notorious members ==
- Rafael Aguilar Guajardo
- Arturo Durazo Moreno (Alias "El Negro Durazo")
- Juan José Esparragoza Moreno (Alias "El Azul")

== See also ==
- CIA cryptonym
- State terrorism
- Mexican Dirty War
- National Intelligence Centre (Mexico)
- Iguala mass kidnapping
- Zapatista Army of National Liberation
- Zapatista uprising
