= Miguel Nazar Haro =

Mexican politician (1924–2012)

- Born: 26 September 1924; Pánuco, Veracruz
- Died: 26 January 2012 (aged 87); Mexico City, Mexico
- Occupation: Domestic intelligence chief
- Employer: Federal government of Mexico

Miguel Nazar Haro (26 September 1924 – 26 January 2012) was the head of Mexico's Dirección Federal de Seguridad (Federal Security Directorate) from 1978 to 1982. He started his career working for the secret-police chief Fernando Gutiérrez Barrios. During his time in the DFS, Nazar Haro and the Directorate were involved in the Mexican government's so called Dirty War, a series of state-crimes against leftist insurgents, social movements and the government's political opposition.

He was arrested in 2004 on charges stemming from the disappearance of a group of alleged guerrillas. In 2006, these charges were dropped.
