= Halcones (paramilitary group) =

Mexican paramilitary group

- Leader: Manuel Díaz Escobar
- Dates active: 1966–1970
- Ideology: Anti-communism; Anti-socialism; Conservatism
- Political position: Far-right
- Status: Dissolved

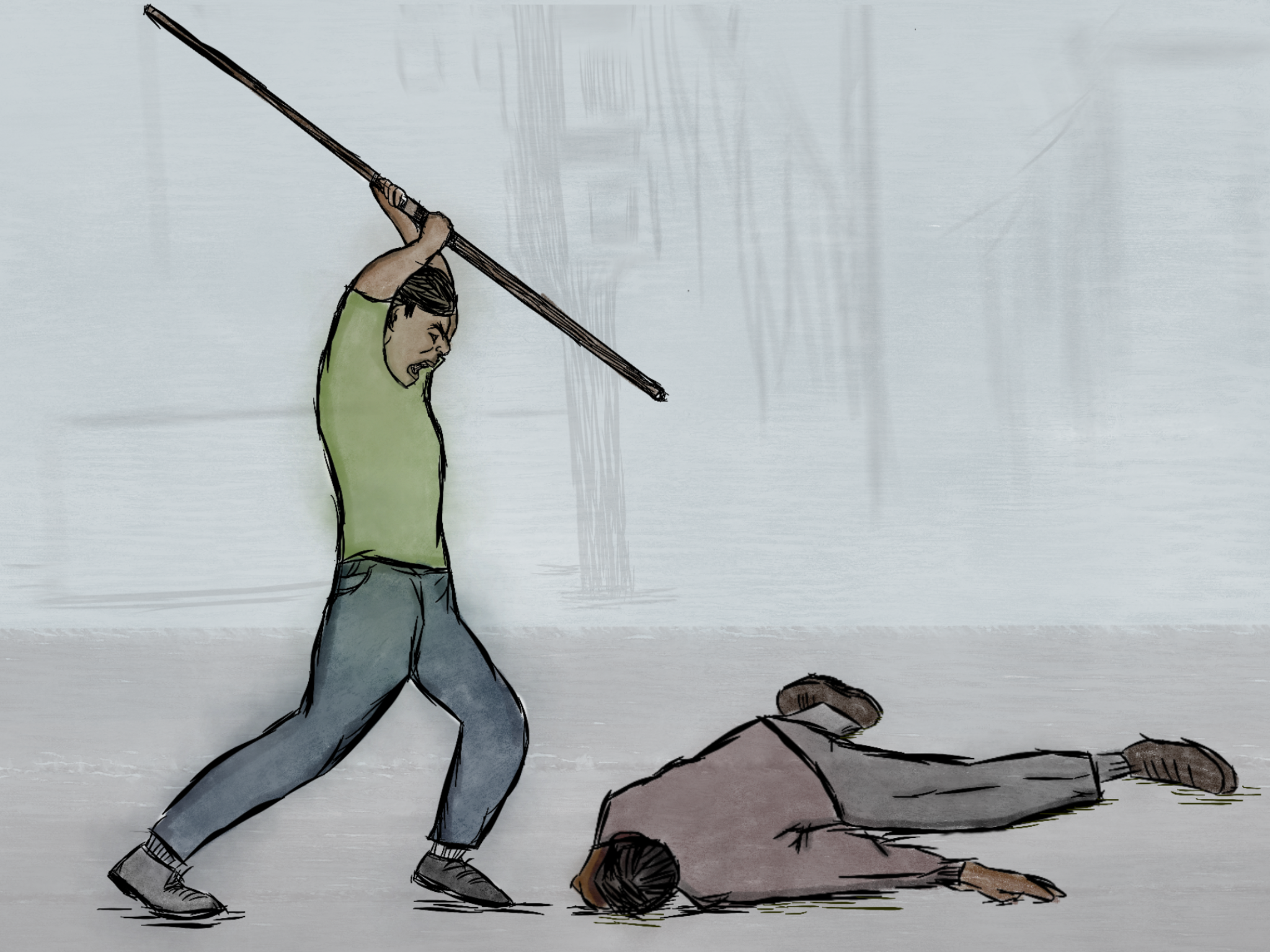
Illustration of a member of Los Halcones beating a demonstrator fallen on the ground with a bamboo stick, in the repression of 10 June 1971 in Mexico City.

The Halcones (Spanish: Falcons) were a Mexican paramilitary group created during the tail end of the 1960s and led by Colonel Manuel Díaz Escobar, the deputy director of the General Services of the Federal District Department. The group was responsible for the El Halconazo massacre on 10 June 1971, in which nearly 120 people were killed during a student demonstration in Mexico City.

== Background ==
The Halcones was organized in September 1968 by the Partido Revolucionario Institucional (PRI), the then dominant Mexican political party. It was considered a semi-official group, directly operating under government authority. It was composed of youths, who formed combat squads trained for the violent suppression of student protesters. They were trained in martial arts at the government's Escuela de Policia (Police Academy). Around 1,500 cadets received this training and received stipends.

The inception of Halcones was part of the overall aim of PRI to counter and repress socialism and communism.

== Halconazo ==
On 10 June 1971, youth movements were in full swing as a reaction to a conflict in the University of Nuevo León. Ten thousand students marched in Mexico City. The Halcones, which allegedly operated under the direction of Federal District officials, attacked the students with bamboo sticks, chains, and clubs, later attacking the students with M1 rifles, chasing them down through neighbouring houses, the Teachers' School (Normal de Maestros), nearby churches and even the Rubén Leñero Hospital, resulting to the injury and the death of at least 35. A similar operation transpired on 4 November 1970, when members of the Halcones attacked students celebrating the victory of the Chilean socialist President Salvador Allende. Echeverría denied that Halcones was sanctioned by the government, maintaining that it was a natural outgrowth of the opposition to the left. However, the considerable number of journalists and photographers attacked on 10 June by the Halcones forced Echeverría to admit their existence; as a result, the regent of Mexico City, Alfonso Martínez Domínguez, resigned.

== See also ==
- Luis Echeverría
- Mexican Movement of 1968
- Brigada de Fusileros Paracaidistas
- Mexican Dirty War
