= Mexican Movement of 1968 =

Social movement

- Part of Protests of 1968 and Mexican Dirty War
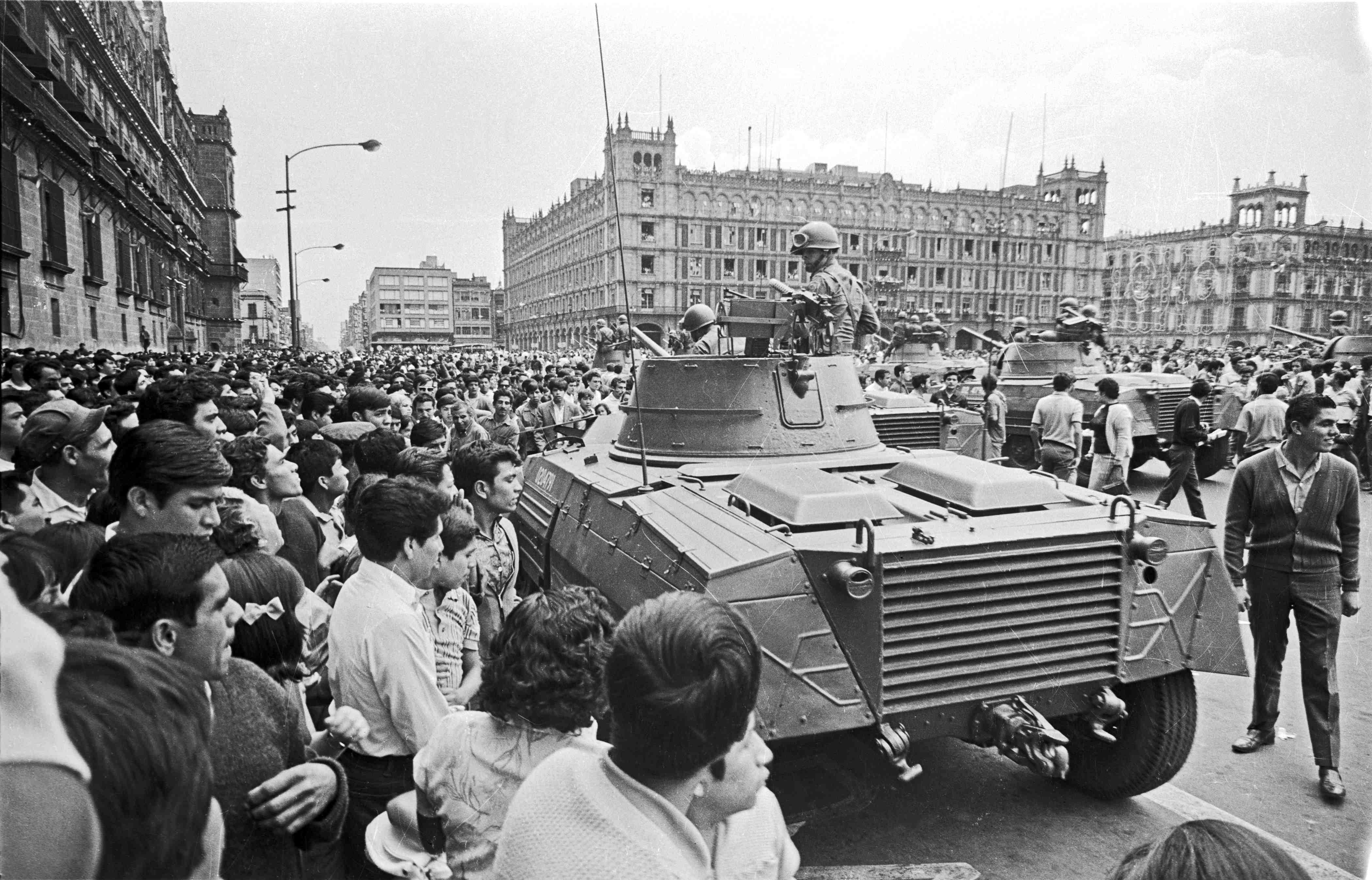
- Armored cars at the Zócalo Plaza in Mexico City in 1968
- Date: July 26, 1968 – October 2, 1968
- Location: Mexico City, Mexico
- Caused by: 1968 Summer Olympics; Dominant-party system; Political repression; Authoritarianism
- Goals: Democratic changes, civil liberties, freedom for political prisoners
- Methods: Student strike, demonstrations, assemblies, social organization
- Result: Tlatelolco massacre; Political reforms in the 1970s

The Mexican Movement of 1968, also known as the Mexican Student Movement (Movimiento Estudiantil) was a social movement composed of a broad coalition of students from Mexico's leading universities that garnered widespread public support for political change in Mexico. A major factor in its emergence publicly was the Mexican government's lavish spending to build Olympic facilities for the 1968 Olympics in Mexico City. The movement demanded greater political freedoms and an end to the authoritarianism of the PRI regime, which had been in power since 1929.

Student mobilization on the campuses of the National Autonomous University of Mexico, National Polytechnic Institute, El Colegio de México, Chapingo Autonomous University, Ibero-American University, Universidad La Salle and Meritorious Autonomous University of Puebla, among others created the National Strike Council. Its efforts to mobilize Mexican people for broad changes in national life was supported by many sectors of Mexican civil society, including workers, peasants, housewives, merchants, intellectuals, artists, and teachers.

The movement had a list of demands for Mexican president Gustavo Díaz Ordaz and the government of Mexico for specific student issues as well as broader ones, especially the reduction or elimination of authoritarianism. Simultaneous with the movement in Mexico and influencing it were global protests of 1968. Demands in Mexico were for a democratic change in the country, more political and civil liberties, the reduction of inequality and the resignation of the government of the ruling Institutional Revolutionary Party (PRI) that they considered authoritarian and by then had governed Mexico since 1929, with only weak political opposition.

The political movement was violently suppressed by the government following a series of mass demonstrations and culminating in a massacre of participants in a peaceful demonstration on 2 October 1968, known as the Tlatelolco massacre. There were lasting changes in Mexican political and cultural life because of the 1968 mobilization.

== Background ==
For several years prior to the protests, Mexico had experienced a period of strong economic performance called the Mexican miracle, which Antonio Ortiz Mena, the Finance Minister, called "the stabilizing development" (El Desarrollo Estabilizador). The currency was stable, the buying power of wages increased by 6.4%, and the government had a low external debt, which allowed the government to preserve fiscal responsibility. However, there was worker unrest before 1968, including a strike by oil workers under President Miguel Alemán that was put down by the army, as well as a railway workers strike under President Adolfo López Mateos that was ended by military intervention under the direction of then Minister of the Interior Gustavo Díaz Ordaz. Most strikes and political opposition had been from workers and peasants, but when Mexican medical doctors went on strike in 1964, the government was faced with middle-class professionals making demands of the government for better working conditions. Díaz Ordaz, now president of Mexico, refused to negotiate with the striking doctors, who caved under pressure. Subsequently many of those participating in the strike were arrested or fired. The strike demonstrated that Díaz Ordaz would tolerate no challenge to his authoritarian presidency. His Minister of the Interior, Luis Echeverria, played the enforcer role that Díaz Ordaz had as Minister of the Interior in the López Mateos cabinet.

=== Student activism prior to 1968 ===
Student activism in Mexico was traditionally largely confined to issues dealing with their circumstances while studying at university. There were two strikes at the National Polytechnic Institute in 1942 and 1956, as well as a strike at the National Teachers' School (Escuela Nacional de Maestras) in 1950, organized by the Federación de Estudiantes y Campesinos Socialistas de México (FECSM). In 1966, Díaz Ordaz intervened in a low-level protest in Morelia at the University of Michoacan over an increase in bus fare. The federal government saw in the protest Communists and "professional agitators involved with foreigners," and a student was shot dead. Demonstrators saw his death as "a victim of the government." Demonstrations increased, with demands for the removal of the governor of the state of Guerrero. Díaz Ordaz refused to negotiate and placed his Minister of the Interior, Luis Echeverría, in charge of the government intervention, occupying the campus. Although there was no evidence of outside agitators or violence on the part of students, the government ordered student residences searched and students evicted. Some students were arrested. A similar scenario occurred at the University of Sonora. In the traditional presidential speech to the legislature on 1 September 1966, just before the occupation of the Morelia campus, Díaz Ordaz made a threat against universities and students. "Neither claims of social and intellectual rank, nor economic position, nor age, nor profession nor occupation grant anyone immunity. I must repeat: No one has rights against Mexico!"

In the 1960s, the Mexican government wanted to showcase its economic progress to the world by hosting the 1968 Olympics in Mexico City. Economic growth had not been spread evenly, and students saw an opportunity to bring reforms and more democracy to Mexico. Arising from reaction to the government's violent repression of fights between rival groups of preparatory students, the student movement in Mexico City quickly grew to include large segments of the student body who were dissatisfied with the regime of the PRI.

=== Mexico City Olympic Games ===
Logo for the 1968 Mexico City Olympics

The 1968 Summer Olympic Games were scheduled to be held in Mexico City, making it the first city in a developing country to host a games edition. The government saw it as an important way to raise Mexico's profile internationally because of the tourist attendees and international television coverage of the event, which could attract international investors. Large amounts of public funding were expended to build Olympic facilities at a time when there were other priorities for the country. Over the summer of 1968, opposition to the Olympics grew and there were major demonstrations against them. Students did not believe that the appearance of Mexico to the world was a priority. They wanted a revolution resulting in the reform of the country. "No queremos Olimpiadas, queremos revolución" (We do not want Olympic Games, we want a revolution). The IOC threatened to move the Games to Los Angeles if the situation deteriorated. The government of Díaz Ordaz wanted the Games to go forward no matter how much repression was required.

== Sparking events of the student movement ==
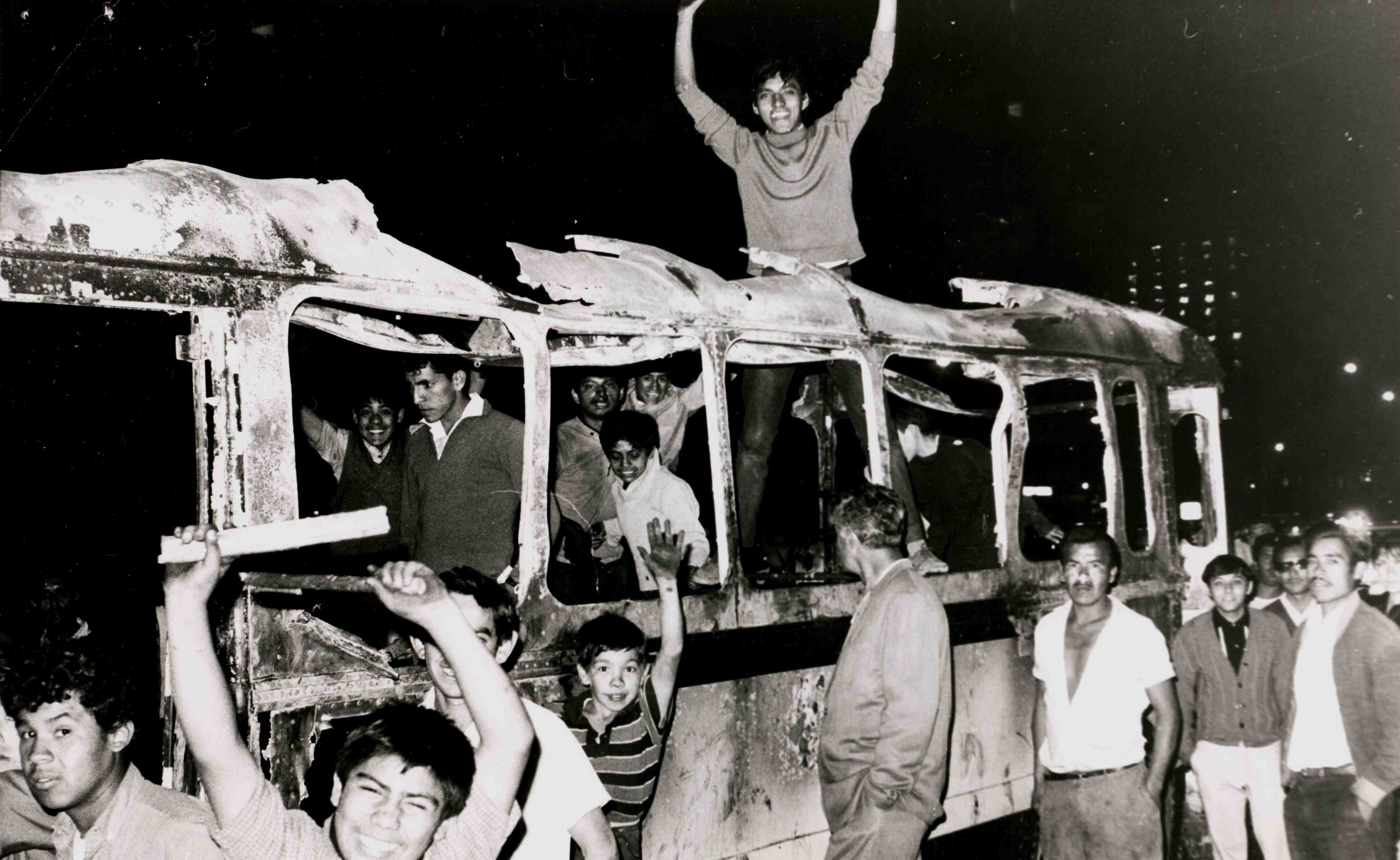
Students on a burned-out bus, 28 July 1968

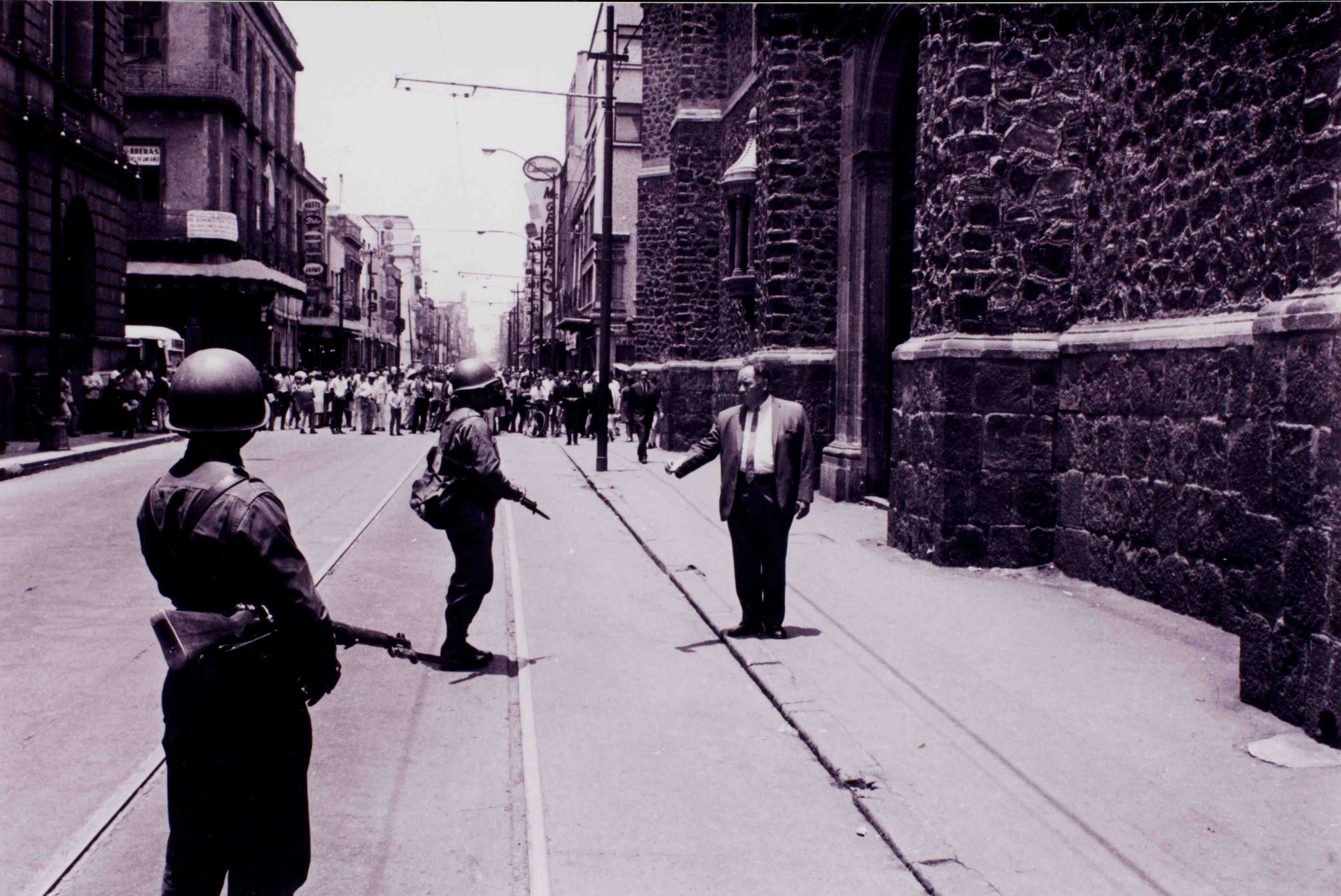
A teacher talks with soldiers in front of high school No. 1 on 30 July while students demonstrate in the background.

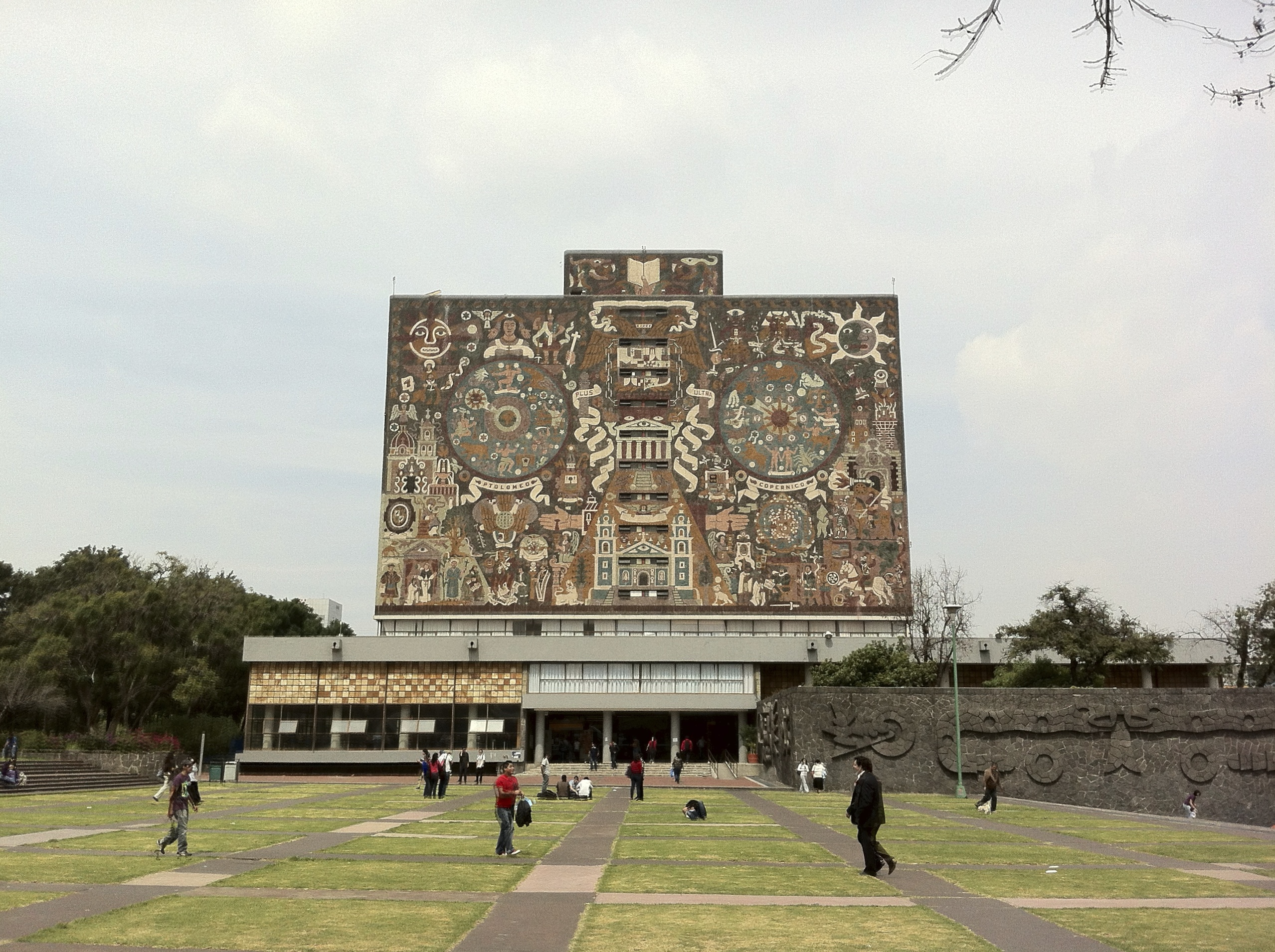
Ciudad Universitaria, site of the UNAM campus, main library

On 22 and 23 July 1968, a confrontation took place between students at Vocational Schools No. 2 and #5—affiliated with the National Polytechnic Institute (IPN)—and the Isaac Ochoterena High School—a preparatory school affiliated with UNAM. The subsequent intervention—described as a "police riot"—by the special police corps of grenadiers resulted in the arrest of several students. In an informal interview with some granaderos, Antonio Careaga recounted that, "the granaderos said that the authorities gave men in the riot squad thirty pesos (approx. three dollars) for every student they clubbed and hauled off to jail."

On 26 July 1968 there were two simultaneous demonstrations took place, one summoned students from the IPN to protest the assault of the grenadiers on students from Vocational School 5. The other demonstration was organized by the Estudiantes Democráticos, a Communist youth organization that was holding a "Youth March for July 26" demonstration commemorated the 15th anniversary of the 1952 assault on the Moncada barracks in Cuba and in solidarity with the Cuban Revolution. The two demonstrations intersected and joined together, marching to the Zócalo. However, they were prevented from entering the central square by mounted police. In the following days, students demonstrated in the streets of downtown Mexico City and set fire to empty buses. During this period hundreds were injured and perhaps a thousand were jailed. Some students fled to the Preparatory School at the former Colegio de San Ildefonso, where police blew open the 18th century carved wooden door with a bazooka. The government claimed that all the agitation and the official response concerned the Mexican Communist Party. What had been a relatively low-level local police matter was "elevated ... to an issue of national security." The Attorney General of the Republic, Julio Sánchez Vargas, issued arrest warrants against "people linked to the disorders", among them were several members of the Mexican Communist Party (PCM).

On 1 August 1968, the rector of the UNAM, Javier Barros Sierra, publicly condemned the events. He viewed the attack and occupation of the preparatory school affiliated with UNAM as a violation of UNAM's autonomy as an institution. He lowered the Mexican flag to half-mast. He then gave an emotional speech he advocated protection of university autonomy and demanded the freedom of political prisoners, referring to the UNAM-affiliated preparatory students who had been arrested. He then led a massive march, with perhaps as many as 50,000 on Av. Insurgentes to the center of the city, returning to UNAM's campus at the Ciudad Universitaria. The student movement chant, Únete Pueblo (People! Join us!), was first used on this march. Mexico City had not seen a student mobilization on this scale for decades, but what was more remarkable about this one was that it was led by the rector of the national university. The orderliness of the demonstration proved to the Mexican public that the students were not rabble-rousers; additionally, the demonstration showed it unlikely that communist agitators could have coordinated the students' actions. The protest route was planned specifically to avoid the Zócalo (Mexico City's main plaza). The current UNAM website stated that the march route began from "University City (CU), ran along Insurgentes Avenue to Félix Cuevas, turned on Félix Cuevas towards Coyoacán Avenue, and returned by University Avenue back to the starting point." The march proceeded without any major disturbances or arrests.

== August to October 1968 ==
=== National Strike Council (CNH) ===
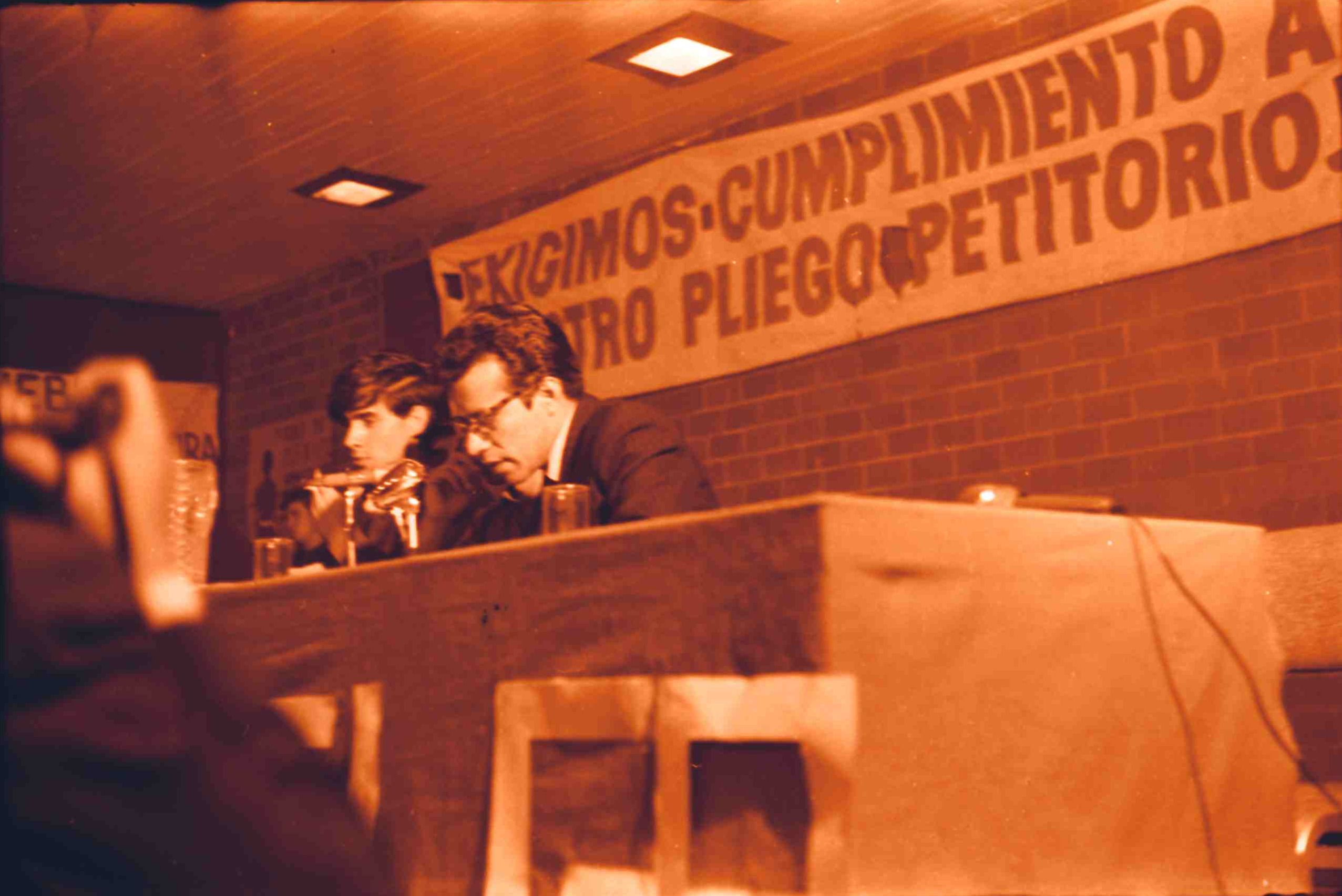
Strike Council members Cabeza de Vaca and Perelló at a press conference. (Mexico, 1968)

Following the protest march led by UNAM's rector, students from several institutions formed the National Strike Council (Consejo Nacional de Huelga or CNH), which organized all subsequent protests against the Díaz Ordaz government. The CNH was a democratic delegation of students from 70 universities and preparatory schools in Mexico; it coordinated protests to promote social, educational, and political reforms. At its apex, the CNH had 240 student delegates and made all decisions by majority vote, had equal representation by female students, and reduced animosity among rival institutions. Raúl Álvarez Garín, Sócrates Campos Lemus, Marcelino Perelló, and Gilberto Guevara Niebla served as the four de facto leaders of the CNH. As the world focused on Mexico City for the Olympics, the CNH leaders sought to gain peaceful progress for festering political and social grievances. Sergio Zermeño has argued that the students were united by a desire for democracy, but their understanding of what democracy meant varied widely.

The movement began to gain support from students outside the capital and from other segments of society, which continued to build until that October. Students formed brigadas (brigades), groups of six or more students who distributed leaflets about the issues in the streets, markets, and most often on public buses. These organizations, the smallest units of the CNH, decided the scope and issues which the student movement would take up. These included both rural and urban concerns. The brigadistas boarded buses to speak to the passengers about the government's corruption and repression, while others distributed leaflets and collected donations. Eventually, the passengers and bus drivers began to sympathize with the students' demands for democracy and justice, and the students collected increasing amounts of money. But the aggressive militancy among the students began to disillusion some bus drivers about the students' motives, and they suspected the youths of seeking power for its own sake.

=== Protests at UNAM ===
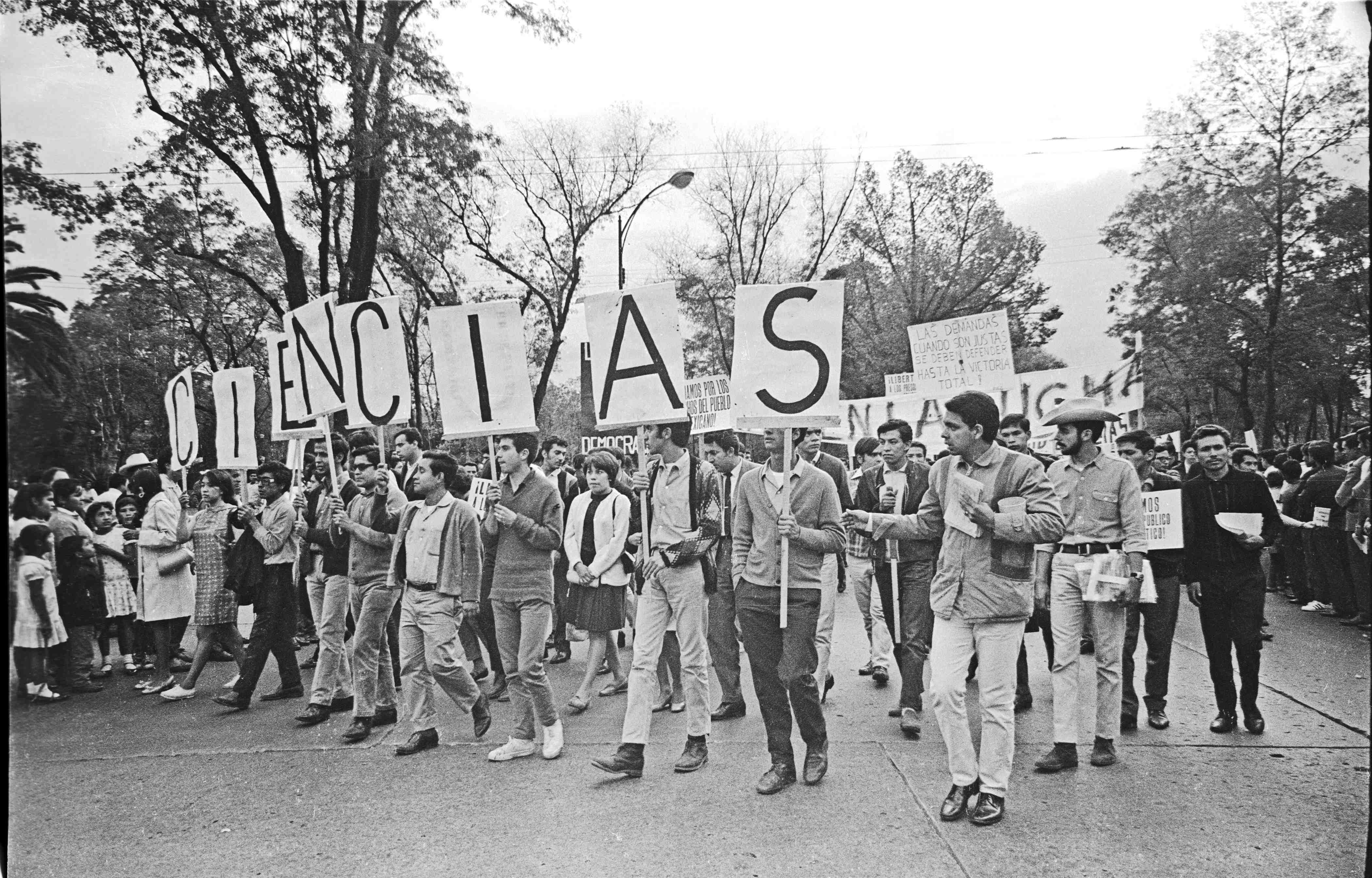
Science students' contingent, 13 August 1968.

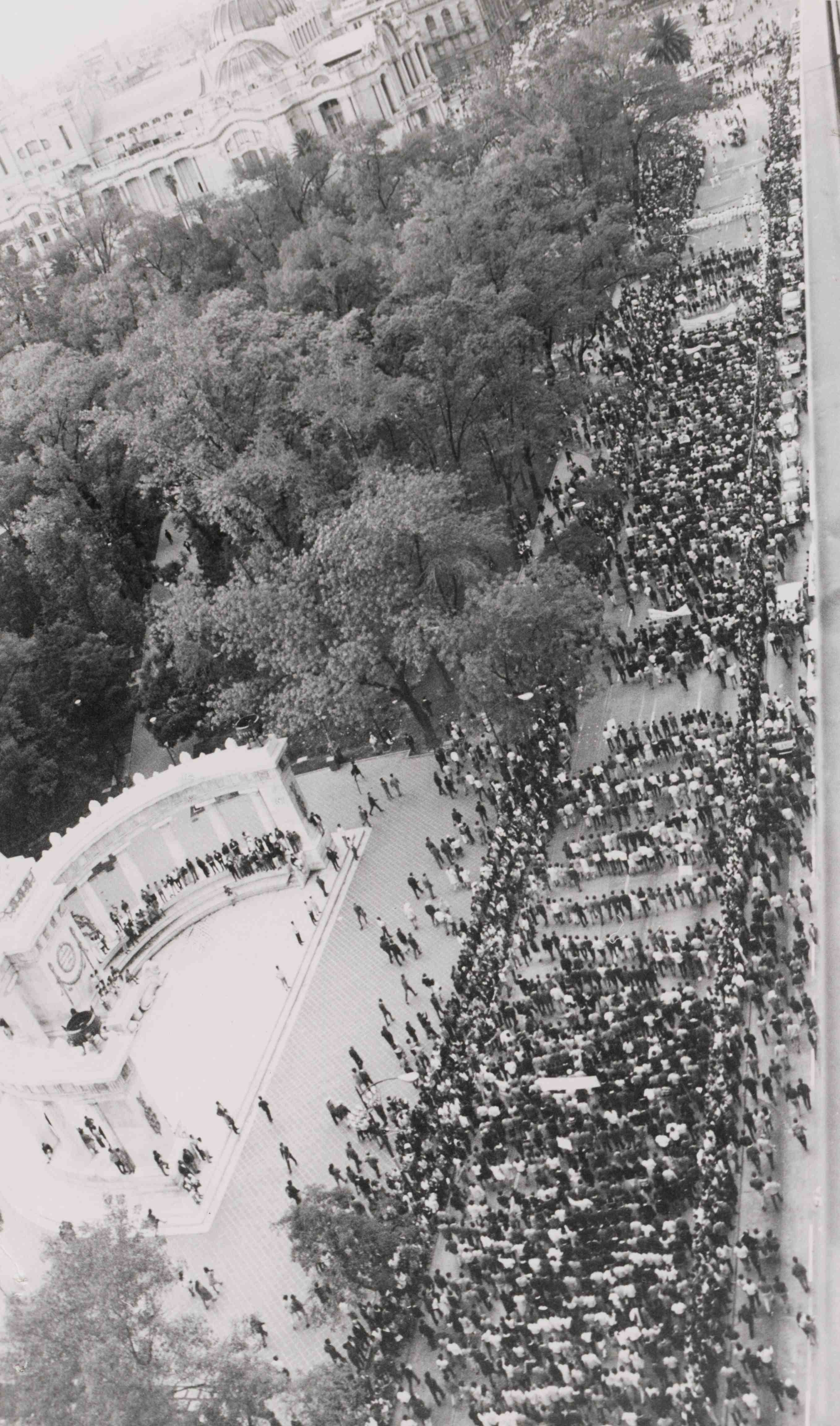
The 27 August student demonstration on Juárez Avenue.

On 9 September, Barros Sierra issued a statement to the students and teachers to return to class as "our institutional demands... have been essentially satisfied by the recent annual message by the Citizen President of the Republic." The CNH issued a paid announcement in the newspaper, El Día, for the Silent March on 13 September; it invited "all workers, farmers, teachers, students, and the general public" to participate in the march. The CNH emphasized that it had no "connection with the Twentieth Olympic Games...or with the national holidays commemorating [Mexico's] Independence, and that this Committee has no intention of interfering with them in any way. The announcement reiterated the list of six demands from the CNH.

With the opening of the Olympics approaching, Díaz Ordaz was determined to stop these demonstrations. In September, he ordered the army to occupy the UNAM campus. They took the campus without firing a bullet, but beat and arrested students indiscriminately. Barros Sierra resigned in protest on 23 September.

=== Silence March ===
The Silence March was a silent demonstration that took place on 13 September, meant to prove that the movement was not a series of riots but had discipline and self-control.

=== September Occupation of IPN (the Polytechnic) ===
Students began to prepare for defensive operations in other institutions. They put on a much stronger resistance when the police and the army tried to occupy the Polytechnic campuses of Zacatenco and Santo Tomas. The battle lasted from 17:00 hours on 23 September to the early hours of 24 September. The physician Justo Igor de León Loyola wrote in his book, La Noche de Santo Tomás (Saint Thomas' night): "Today I have seen bloodier fights, unequal battles: Both sides are armed... but what a difference in the weapons, .22 caliber handguns against M-1 military rifles, bazookas against Molotov cocktails."

The Polytechnic students held their campuses against the army for more than twelve hours, which aroused strong opposition by the government. The French journal L'Express stated that 15 people died in the battles and that more than one thousand bullets were fired; the government reported three dead and 45 injured people. Students from the Santo Tomás campus who were arrested in the occupations later said that they had been concentrated for defense in the entry lobbies. The military shot students at random and some of their friends did not survive.

=== Tlatelolco massacre ===
The movement was permanently repressed by the government and finally tried to annihilate on the Tlatelolco massacre on 2 October 1968. The massacre was planned and executed under the code name Operation Galeana, by the paramilitary group called Batallón Olimpia, the Federal Security Direction (DFS), then the so-called Secret Police and the Mexican Army simulating a shooting in the Plaza de las Tres Culturas after the conclusion of a concentration of the CNH. One year after, in 1969, President Gustavo Díaz Ordaz – also a CIA informant – assumed responsibility for the massacre. On 2 October 1968, at 5 pm in the Plaza de las Tres Culturas in Tlatelolco, a neighborhood of Mexico City, almost 10 thousand men, women and children stood waiting for a meeting to start. However, when the leaders of the several student organizations and movements arrived, policemen and the military, sent by President Díaz Ordaz and commanded by Luis Echeverria, decided to dissolve the meeting. A student claims that at about 6:10 a helicopter dropped three flares over the plaza, quickly followed by the first gunshots. Students were kidnapped, tortured, and killed by the government.

=== Government strategies to counter the movement ===
During the presidency of Vicente Fox (2000–2006), his administration created a commission to investigate the Mexican government's activities during the so-called dirty war. The report, Informe Documenta sobre 18 años de "Guerra Sucia" en México, written by the Fiscal Especial: Responsabilidad del Estado en Cientos de Asesinatos y Desapariciones, was digitally published in draft form. The report documents the multi-pronged strategy by President Gustavo Díaz Ordaz and his Minister of the Interior, Luis Echeverría, to contain, control, and suppress the student protests. Government agents infiltrated universities and schools to gain information about student organizations and leaders, their action plans, and were at times agents provocateurs, promoting acts that could then be used as reasons for government violence. The government also co-opted organizations that could act as mediators, silencing dissent, and controlling their functions. Members of police and other organized government units posed as students, inciting them to act criminally, then hiding their identity in prosecutions, skewing the judicial system. Outright government force was also used. The government created paramilitary organizations to destroy their opponents, perpetrating human rights violations. The government used the Mexican army as the last resort. The Tlatelolco massacre is the most prominent example of the government's repression.

== Aftermath of the 1968 Movement ==
This social movement brought unavoidable consequences which permanently changed the future of Mexico, but these political and social changes were not immediate, as the repression continued with the Corpus Christi massacre in 1971.

The major change caused by this movement came at a political level. The citizens had the opportunity to live a new democracy in which their opinion could actually bring change in society. People no longer completely trusted the government and would no longer live completely under the conscious control of their government, nor tolerate it anymore, although they were not completely free. Octavio Paz resigned from his post as Mexican ambassador to India as an act of protest against the government's harsh repression of the student movements. However, there were also some older intellectuals who were in favor of the government, like Agustín Yañez.

== Human rights violations ==
Twenty-two years after the Government of Mexico established a Special Prosecutor for the Social and Political Movements of the Past, the Fiscalía Especial para Movimientos Sociales y Políticos del Pasado (FEMOSSP). After the reopening of the case, it was concluded that the movement marked an inflection "in the political times of Mexico" and was "independent, rebellious and close to civil resistance", the latter officially recognizing the main argument of Gustavo Díaz Ordaz's official version that the reason behind the movement was the aim to install a Communist regime as false. With this argument the Mexican government justified its strategy to combat the movement and characterizing it as a foreign risk with terrorists pretensions.

In that order the Mexican government planned and ordered an extermination campaign during the months of the movement and after based on a massive strategy of Human rights violations as false imprisonments, abuses, torture, persecution, espionage, criminalization; also crimes as forced disappearances, homicides and extrajudicial killings. All throughout this period, the Mexican government had an active role in advisory, presence, and intelligence operations of the Central Intelligence Agency of the United States under the undercovered Operation LITEMPO, including having Díaz Ordaz and other high representatives of the Mexican Government as informants. The number of victims, disappeared and imprisoned is still imprecise.

Some victims of the Tlatelolco massacre tried to sue the 2 October killings on national and international courts as a crime against humanity and a genocide, affirmation that was sustained by FEMOSPP but rejected by its courts. Some political scientists, historians and intellectuals like Carlos Monsiváis agreed in pointing out that this movement and its conclusion incited a permanent and more active critical and oppositional attitude of civil society, mainly in public universities. As well, it provoked the radicalization of some survivor activists who opted for clandestine action and formed urban and rural guerrillas, which were repressed in the so-called Dirty War during the 1970s.

== See also ==
- Democracy in Mexico
