= José de Molina =

Mexican 20th century activist and anarchist singer-songwriter

- Born: José de Jesús Nuñez Molina; 2 November 1938; Hermosillo, Sonora
- Died: July 9, 1998 (aged 59) Mexico City
- Cause of death: Suicide
- Genres: Protest song, folk, corridos
- Occupations: Singer-songwriter, actor
- Instruments: Vocals, guitar
- Years active: 1963-1998
- Label: Nueva Voz Latinoamericana
- Spouse: Araceli Abud Farías

José de Jesús Nuñez Molina (Spanish pronunciation: [ˈxoˈse ˈð̞e̞ xeˈsus ˈnu.ɲes moˈli.na]; 2 November 1938–9 July 1998), better known as José de Molina, was a Mexican singer-songwriter, actor, and activist. Known also by the nickname "el Guerillero de la guitarra" (the Guitar Wielding Guerillero), he was the composer of songs such as "Obreros y Patrones", "Marcha de las Madres Latinas", "Se Acabó", amongst others. Spending over 30 years as an artist and composer, he released 11 albums and toured throughout Mexico, Latin America, and Europe.

== Early life ==
José de Molina was born on November 2, 1938, in Hermosillo, Sonora. However, some sources note that his exact date of birth is uncertain, and that Molina himself was not entirely sure of it. He was born into a poor peasant family, and was left orphaned when he was around the age of three. Consequently, Molina was adopted by his godfather, Jesús del Valle, who taught him to play guitar and work the land. By the age of 16, Molina moves to Mexico City, where he worked at various trades and study at night schools until his admittance to the National School of Theatre at the Instituto Nacional de Bellas Artes.

== Artistic career and political activism ==
During his time at the Instituto Nacional de Bellas Artes, José de Molina was introduced to the local marxist studies circles by one of his professors. Likewise, in 1962, Molina attended a lecture at the UNAM School of Philosophy and Letters where he met Rubén Jaramillo one month before his assassination. This event, combined with the influences of his academic circles, led Molina to compose his first political songs, including "Corrido a Rubén Jaramillo".

In 1963, Molina went on a short tour through Central America. However, it wasn't until 1966 that, for the first time, he was invited to perform a concert as a political singer at UNAM in front an audience of 400 students and activists, including José Revueltas, who would approach Molina at the end of his concert and encourage him to continue writing music.

During this period, Molina kept playing political music and went on a tour throughout northern Mexico. It was during this tour, in the town of Tuitán, Durango, that he first met Lucio Cabañas, who became a recurring figure in Molina's work. In addition to music, Molina also became involved in the theatre scene, appearing as an actor alongside figures such as Óscar Chávez, and composing music for various plays, including "Pueblo Rechazado" and "Compañero" by playwright Vicente Leñero.

During 1968, Molina became an active participant of the Mexican student movement, as can be seen in a scene of the documentary El Grito, México 68, which shows various students singing "Marcha de las Madres Latinas", a song of his that became very popular during this time period. He was also a survivor of the Tlatelolco Massacre later that year.

In 1969, Molina was invited to a cultural event in Guerrero, during which he met Genaro Vázquez Rojas. They later had a conversation in which Vázquez Rojas convinced Molina to join the National Revolutionary Civic Association, which Molina would later assist both in the transportation of weaponry and in the financial support of the movement.

In 1971, Molina took part in a student movement opposing the government of Luis Echeverria, which would be suppressed during the El Halconazo massacre. After witnessing and surviving this event, Molina decided to release his first album, "Canticos y Testimonios". He acquired the nickname "el guerrillero de la guitarra" at this time.

In 1972, following an escalation of repression by the Mexican government and the assassination of figures such as Gernaro Vázquez Rojas, Molina decided to go into a self-imposed exile in the United States, where he went on a brief tour and met with activists involved in the Chicano movement in San Diego, California.

In 1973, Molina returned to Mexico and released his second album, "Testimonios Rebeldes". On June 13 of that same year, a special performance sponsored by the UNAM Workers' and Employees' Union was held at the Blanquita Theater in Mexico City, in which Molina participated alongside other notable activist figures at the time. In 1974, however, after facing some threats by the Federal Security Directorate, Molina decided to go into another self-imposed exile and undertook a brief tour of Puerto Rico. Upon returning to Mexico later that same year, Molina was invited to participate in a gathering at the Rubén Jaramillo Proletarian Colony, a maoist commune established by a group of peasants led by Florencio Medrano. In this event, Molina met with Medrano, who would convince him to lend his support to the organization.

During the early to mid 1970s, Molina was subject to surveillance and investigations by the General Directorate of Political and Social Investigations. However, after the end of Luis Echeverria's sexenio, due to the legalization of left-wing political parties in 1978, and the amnesties provided to many political prisoners, the hostilities between the Mexican government and the various guerrilla groups started to cease. During this period, Molina received several offers of artistic grants and financial aid from the Mexican government as incentives for him move to Europe. However, Molina refused these offers and accused the government of trying to bribe him. For the rest of the decade and until the mid 1990s, Molina mostly dedicated himself to producing and distributing his musical work, and he collaborated with multiple artists and activists including Amparo Ochoa, Los Nakos, amongst others. He published all of his albums under his own record label, "Nueva Voz Latinoamericana".

After 1994, with the rise of the Ejercito Zapatista de Liberación Nacional, Molina decided to organize concerts every afternoon in Mexico City's Zocalo in their support. In 1995, he also released his last album, "De Chiapas Con Amor" in support of the Zapatista movement. Such afternoon concerts continued every day until his death.

== Death ==
On May 5, 1997, José de Molina was kidnapped and tortured by the political police, during the United States President Bill Clinton's visit to Mexico. As a result of the beatings received during this episode, he had to be hospitalized and was afterwards left with chronic pain issues. Subsequently, on July 9, 1998, José de Molina committed suicide. His son, Arturo de Molina, accuses and holds former Mexican President Ernesto Zedillo responsible for Molina's death, since according to him, the beatings he received aggravated the health conditions that had previously been afflicting him.

== Impact ==
In 2005, the poet Martin Martinez released a biography of Molina's life titled "José de Molina: El guerrillero de la guitarra". Martinez also release a second edition commemorating Molina's 20th death anniversary in 2018.

In 2007, on the 9th anniversary of his death, a tribute was paid to him in which family, friends and collaborators of Molina participated. The tribute was held for eight hours, and took place in the auditorium of the Mexican Syndicate of Electricians.

Similarly, in 2013, to mark the 15th anniversary of his death, a tribute concert was held at the Foro Cultural Coyoacanense, featuring artists such as León Chávez Teixeiro, Francisco Barrios "El Mastuerzo", and Tania de Molina (Molina's daughter), amongst others.

Again, on the year 2023, on the 25th anniversary of his death, another festival named "Tu peligrosa guitarra" was held in his honor that included the participation of various activists and singers such as, Ana Ignacia Rodriguez, Marx Ricardo Cartagena (son of Mario Álvaro Cartagena López), amongst others.

In 2024, the Community Education Subsystem in México City renamed one of their centers in the Coyoacán district to "José de Molina". In this center, classes in various disciplines such as computer science, music, and Mexican sign language, among others are offered. A mural depicting José de Molina is also present at the entrance of the building.

While alive, many of Molina's songs had an influence on guerilla movements all throughout Latin America. Most notably, his songs acquired a significant popularity amongst members and sympathizers of the Ejercito Zapatista de Liberación Nacional. Even after his death, his songs have continued to be played on some college and national radio stations throughout Mexico. Special radio programs have also since been broadcast in his honor.

== Political views ==
José de Molina all throughout his life showed support and participated in various guerrilla groups in Mexico. He, however, also publicly supported many guerrilla groups in Latin America, including the FSLN, the FMLN, and even, according to some sources, the PCP-SL. Molina also showed support for various international causes, most notably, the Catalan independence movement, for which he expressed support for during a tour of Catalonia in the 1990s.

Some sources mention that Molina briefly identified with a Maoist label during the 1970s. However, for most of his life, he openly identified himself as a libertarian socialist, as he believed that all forms of government eventually become corrupt. For this reason—and because he did not believe that the electoral process could bring about the radical changes he advocated for—he never joined any political party.

== Discography ==
During his lifetime, José de Molina released 11 albums:

- 1971 - Canticos y Testimonios
- 1973 - Testimonios Rebeldes
- 1976 - Se Acabó
- 1979 - Salsa… Roja
- 1980 - Historia Verdadera de un Sexenio
- 1981 - Contraconfesiones
- 1981 - Del Surrealismo, La Picaresca y el Humor
- 1982 - Manifiesto
- 1985 - Terremoto
- 1994 - Identidades
- 1995 - De Chiapas con Amor

In addition, one more album titled "Despues de la muerte" (1998) was released after his death. The songs on the album are original compositions by José de Molina that he did not live to record. They are performed by his daughter Tania Molina and by singer Chucho Gil.

(1980) Historia Verdadera de un Sex-enio

"Historia Verdadera de un Sex-enio" is an album that was released both as a double LP under the title "Historia Verdadera de un Sex-enio" and on cassette, with the latter being divided into two volumes under the name "Historia de un Verdadero Sex-enio". The first volume of the cassette is almost identical to the first disc of the LP, differing only in the omission of track number six, titled “Texto”, and instead including a song titled “Mujeres”, featuring Amparo Ochoa. Meanwhile, the second volume remains identical to the second disc of the LP.

(1981) Del Surrealismo, la Picaresca, y el Humor

Del Surrealismo, la Picaresca, y el Humor is a somewhat unique album in José de Molina's discography, as it was a collaboration between José de Molina, Los Nakos, and Sergio Magaña. In addition, this album features songs in a variety of musical genres, ranging from tango and norteña to bossa nova.

In addition, there are two versions of this album; one in LP format published in 1981, and another in cassette format published in 1994. Both versions differ quite a bit; for example, the 1981 version has the track “Sueño Irreversible” which is not found in the 1994 version. Meanwhile, in the 1994 version, there are three more tracks (“El Tratado de Libre Comercio”, “El Pique 96”, and “Partidos y Partiditos”), which are not found in the 1981 version. In addition, in the 1994 version, the track “La Ludica Mujer Impúdica” presents significant changes in terms of the instrumentation used.

(1994) De Chiapas con Amor

Like other albums in José de Molina's discography, "De Chiapas con Amor" comes in two different versions.

The first of these was released in February 1994 by the label “Nueva Voz Latinoamericana”, bearing the catalog number “JS-27” on both the spine of the packaging and the cassette cover. This version is distinct from others (in addition to having color-printed packaging) by the fact that the first track, titled “Corrido al EZLN (La toma de San Cristóbal)”, features a guitar intro absent from other versions of the album. Additionally, this version includes a track titled “Corrido a Zapata”, which is also not found in other versions of the album.

As for the second version, neither the record label nor the release date are known; however, this version is distinct from others (in addition to having a black and white packaging) by the fact that the first track, titled “Corrido al EZLN (La toma de San Cristóbal)”, features an instrumental introduction absent from other versions. Additionally, this version includes a track titled “Che”, which is not found on other versions of the album.
