= Leobardo =

Leobardo is a given name. Notable people with the name include:

- Leobardo Alcalá (born 1960), Mexican politician
- Leobardo Candiani (1904–1986), Mexican fencer
- Leobardo Curiel Preciado (born 1947), Mexican politician
- Leobardo López (born 1983), Mexican footballer
- Leobardo López Aretche (1942–1970), Mexican film director
- Leobardo Pérez Jiménez (born 1945), Colombian abstract and figurative artist
- Leobardo Soto (born 1971), Mexican politician
- Leobardo Vázquez Atzin (c. 1975–2018), Mexican journalist

== See also ==
- General Leobardo C. Ruiz International (airport), Zacatecas, Mexico
