= La Linda, Antioquia =

Settlement in Colombia

La Linda
- Vereda
- Location in Valle del Cauca and Colombia La Linda (Colombia)
- Coordinates: 5°57′0″N 75°17′0″W
- Country: Colombia
- Department: Antioquia
- Municipality: El Carmen de Viboral municipality
- Elevation: 8,600 ft (2,620 m)
- Time zone: UTC-5 (Colombia Standard Time)

La Linda is a vereda in El Carmen de Viboral municipality, Antioquia Department, Colombia.

== Climate ==
La Linda has a mild and very wet subtropical highland climate (Köppen Cfb).

Climate data for La Linda
Month	Jan	Feb	Mar	Apr	May	Jun	Jul	Aug	Sep	Oct	Nov	Dec	Year
Mean daily maximum °C (°F)	18.2 (64.8)	18.5 (65.3)	18.7 (65.7)	18.2 (64.8)	18.3 (64.9)	18.5 (65.3)	18.4 (65.1)	18.5 (65.3)	18.4 (65.1)	17.7 (63.9)	17.7 (63.9)	17.7 (63.9)	18.2 (64.8)
Daily mean °C (°F)	13.6 (56.5)	13.9 (57.0)	14.2 (57.6)	13.9 (57.0)	14.1 (57.4)	14.1 (57.4)	13.6 (56.5)	13.7 (56.7)	13.7 (56.7)	13.4 (56.1)	13.4 (56.1)	13.5 (56.3)	13.8 (56.8)
Mean daily minimum °C (°F)	9.1 (48.4)	9.4 (48.9)	9.7 (49.5)	9.7 (49.5)	9.9 (49.8)	9.7 (49.5)	8.9 (48.0)	8.9 (48.0)	9.0 (48.2)	9.2 (48.6)	9.2 (48.6)	9.3 (48.7)	9.3 (48.8)
Average rainfall mm (inches)	234.8 (9.24)	270.2 (10.64)	345.2 (13.59)	466.2 (18.35)	485.4 (19.11)	495.4 (19.50)	381.2 (15.01)	475.2 (18.71)	555.2 (21.86)	390.8 (15.39)	316.2 (12.45)	273.8 (10.78)	4,689.6 (184.63)
Average rainy days	21	19	21	25	26	20	16	18	23	24	22	21	256
