= Ismael Durán =

Chilean musician and social activist

Ismael "Bandolero" Durán
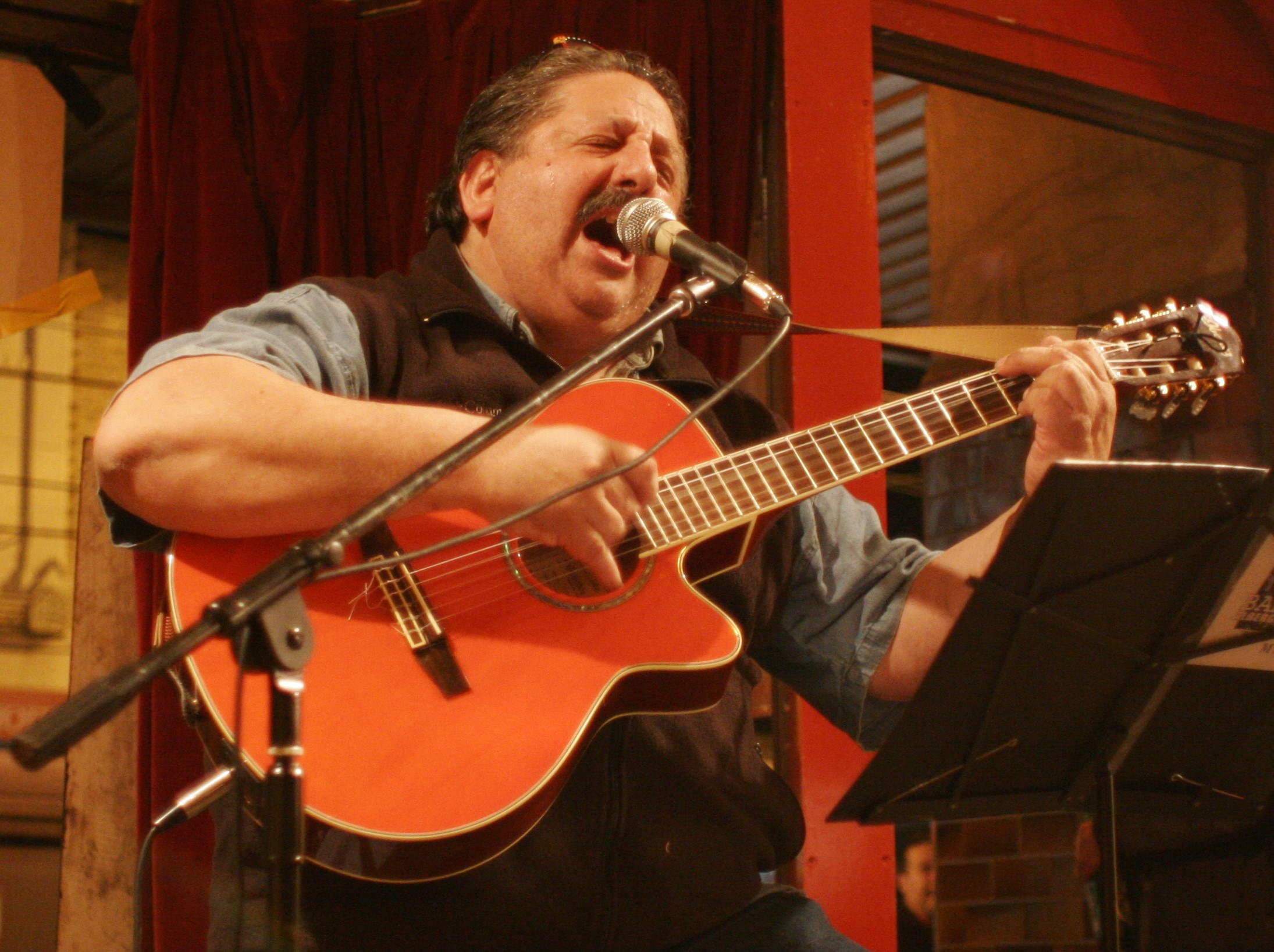
- Born: Ismael Leonardo Durán Galfano; April 8, 1949; Punta Arenas, Chile
- Died: October 5, 2021 (aged 72); Detroit, United States
- Occupations: Singer – musician – arts and cultural worker

Signature
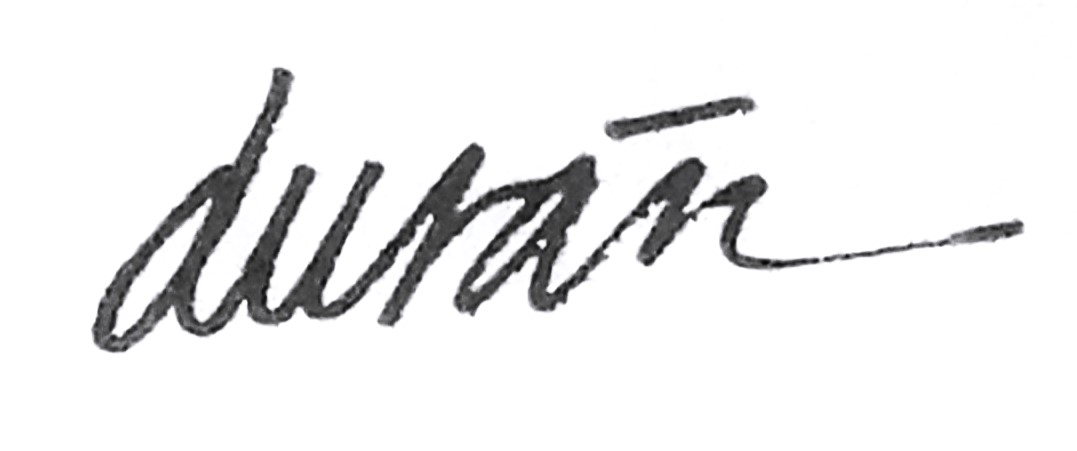

Ismael Durán (8 April 1949 – 5 October 2021), also known as Bandolero Durán, was a Chilean singer-songwriter and cultural organizer committed to social justice and human rights movements in Latin America.

== Biography ==
Ismael was born in 1949 in Punta Arenas, Chile to Ada Galfano and Darío Durán. He spent his teenage years in the commune of Puente Alto, where he learned to sing and play the guitar.

After the 1973 military coup in Chile, he emigrated to Europe. In Paris, he met his wife Mary Clare Carolan, a grade-school arts and language teacher, and they soon moved to Detroit, Michigan, where they raised their children.

=== Early career (1975–1983) ===
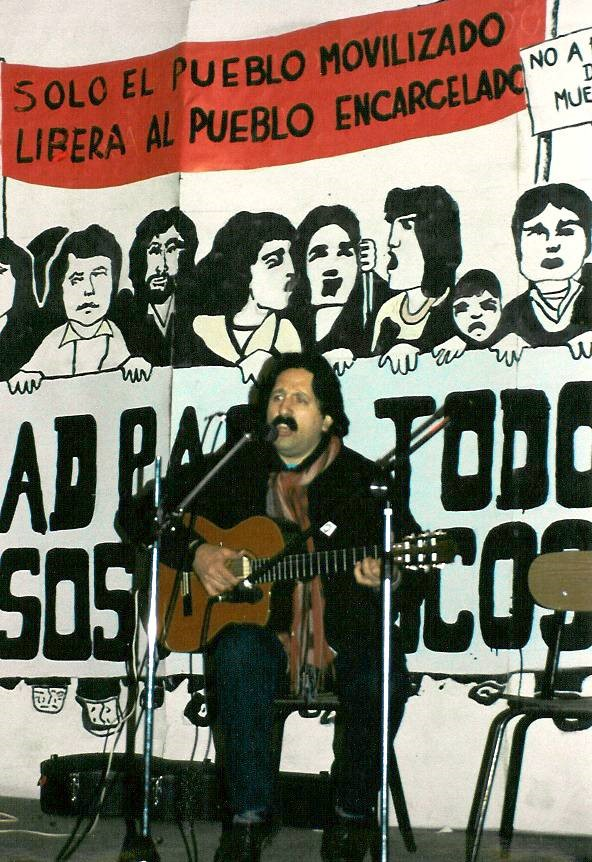
Supporting a Chilean solidarity event.

While living abroad, Ismael met Chilean exile communities in cities like Toronto and San Francisco, and began to make Latin American folk music with social and political content, inspired by singers like Atahualpa Yupanqui, Violeta Parra, Victor Jara and Alfredo Zitarrosa, and artistic movements like the Nueva Canción and the Nueva trova. During that time, he met Latin American singers such as León Gieco (Argentina), Daniel Viglietti (Uruguay) and Manuel Monroy Chazarreta (Bolivia). One of his great friends and collaborators was the Chilean songwriter Marcelo Puente, and for years Ismael interpreted several songs composed by him, such as "Compañero" (a tribute to the martyrs of the Chilean resistance) and "Cuando Vuelvas" (a song for the exiles returning to the country).

In 1982 he co-founded the "Peña El Caminero" in Aguascalientes, Mexico. During his time in that country, he made friends with Mexican singers Gabino Palomares and León Chávez Teixeiro.

=== Return to Chile (1984–1990) ===
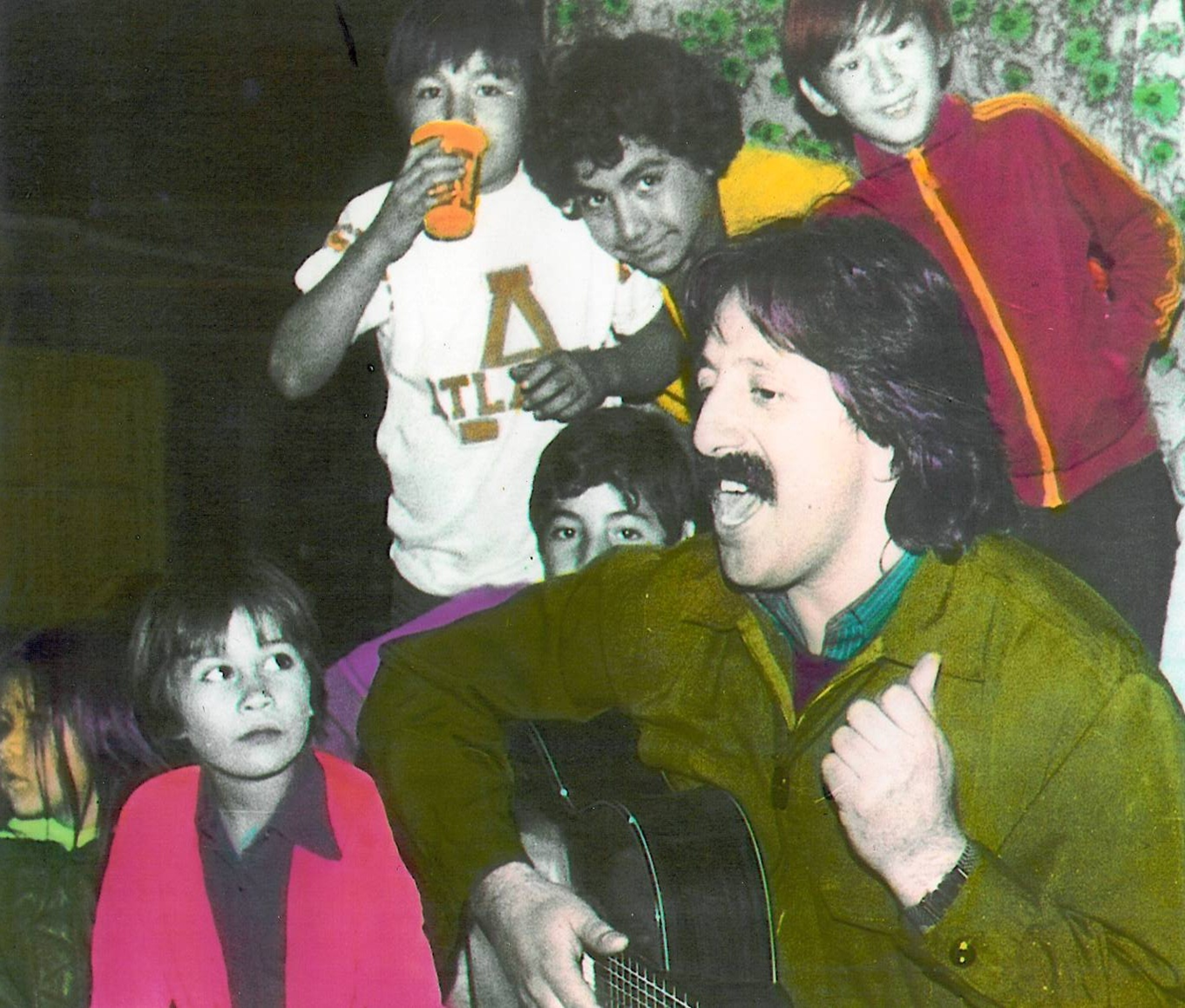
Playing in a shantytown (población) in Santiago.

In 1984 Ismael returned to Santiago to participate with other Chilean artists in the political-cultural movement against the military dictatorship of Augusto Pinochet. He joined "Taller Sol", a countercultural space founded by the poet and graphic designer Antonio Kadima, and together they toured Europe to share news of the Chilean struggle. Ismael frequently performed in solidarity activities in peñas, unions, poblaciones (poor working-class neighborhoods) and universities with colleagues such as Rebeca Godoy, Cristina Narea, Payo Grondona, Jorge Venegas and Luis Le-Bert and bands such as Transporte Urbano, Sol y Lluvia and De Kiruza.

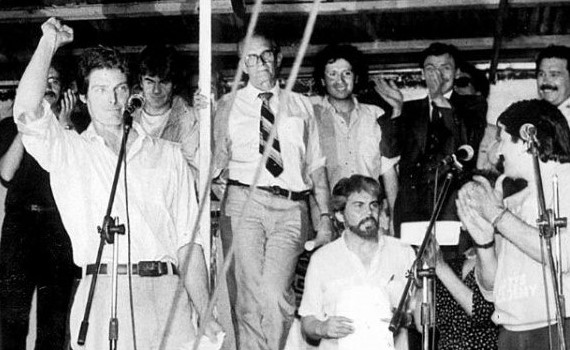
Ismael (right) interpreting during the visit of Christopher Reeve (left) to Chile.

Invited along with other Chilean artists, in 1985 Ismael participated in the XII World Festival of Youth and Students in the Soviet Union. In 1987, he assisted as a translator for U.S. actor Christopher Reeve (famous at the time for playing "Superman"), who visited Chile after actors and playwrights opposing Pinochet had received death threats sent by extreme right-wing groups. He also similarly assisted in the visit of U.S. singer and activist Pete Seeger.

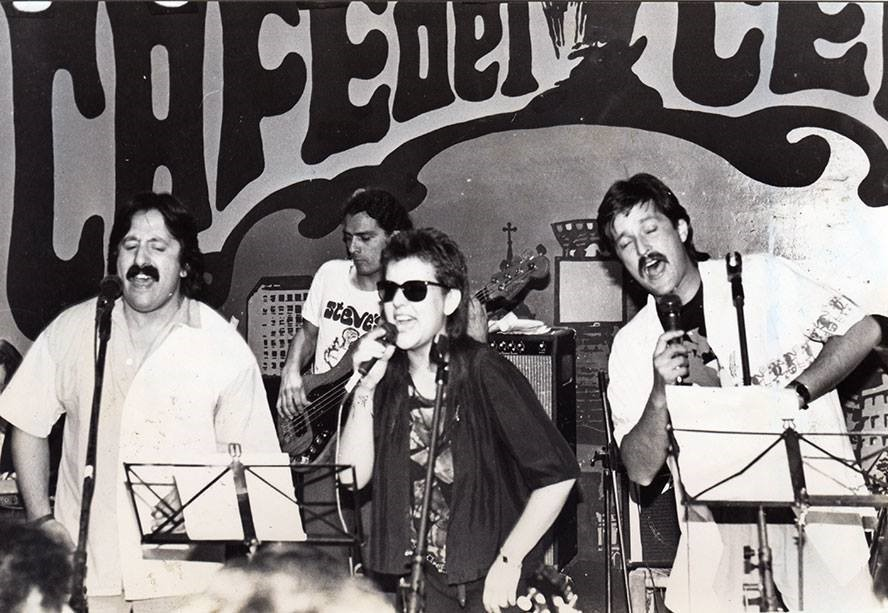
Singing with Cristina Narea, Juan Valladares and Jorge Campos at Café del Cerro.

In 1987, together with Patricio Lanfranco and Juan Valladares of the group Amauta, he opened the cultural space Casa de los Músicos ("The Musicians’ House") in the Bellavista neighborhood. In 1989, he worked on the human rights concert called "From Chile.... An Embrace of Hope", organized by Amnesty International in October 1990, with guests such as Peter Gabriel, Sinéad O'Connor and Rubén Blades.

=== Musical style and discography ===
Ismael's musical repertoire included chacareras, milongas, corridos, sones cubanos, Latin American protest songs, and some songs of his own. In 1985, he recorded with Ana María Miranda the song "El Paralojito" (I Promote the Strike), a call for social mobilization (included in the album Movimiento Democrático Popular) and "Por ti Juventud" (For You, Youth), a call for unity between the Revolutionary Left Movement (MIR) and the Manuel Rodríguez Patriotic Front (FPMR) (included years later in the album Con Vista a la Esperanza published in honor of Miguel Enríquez). One of his favorite songs, "Los Pequeños Ambulantes" (The Little Vendors), denounced the persecution suffered by children working as street vendors at the hands of the Chilean police ("pacos"). He also created the song "El Amor es un Arma Muy Peligrosa" in homage to the brothers Rafael, Eduardo and Pablo Vergara Toledo, young MIR militants assassinated by the dictatorship in 1985 and 1988. He recorded a Spanish-language version of "They Dance Alone" (Cueca Solo), written by British singer Sting.

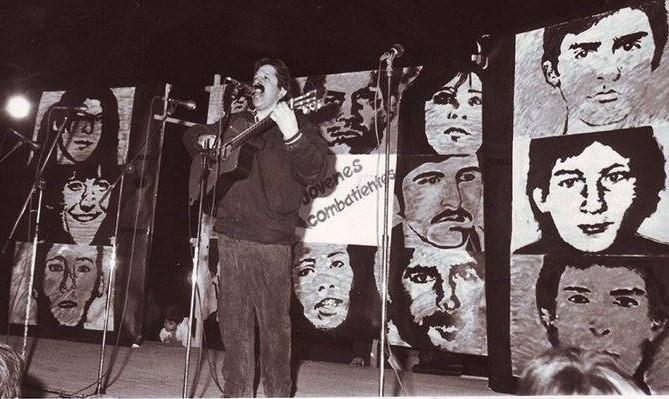
Political rally for the Young Combatant's Day in Villa Francia (March 29, 1989).

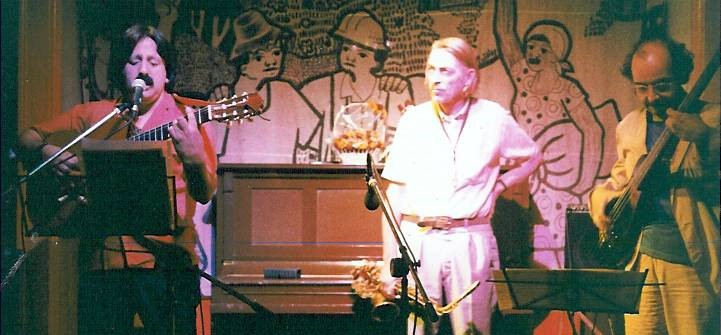
With Enrique Luna and Sandro Salvati at Casa de los Músicos.

Ismael released three albums: Traigo Buenas Nuevas ("I Bring Good News"), a homemade production from 1983, Memorias de la Dignidad ("Memories of Dignity") in 1988 with the Argentine rock group Vimanas (with Piny Levalle, Pablo Trosman, Luis Chomicz and Celso Barría) and Bandolero in 1989 with the jazz-fusion group of the same name (with Enrique Luna, Carlos Aguirre, Jaime Vivanco, Claudio Araya, Jaime Vásquez and Sandro Salvati).

=== Return to the United States (1990–2021) ===
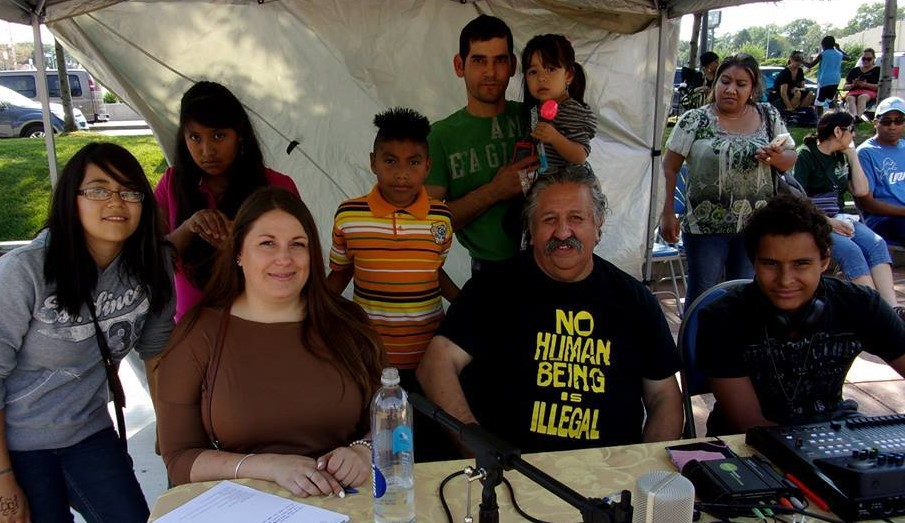
Ismael and Amelia Durán (center-left), co-founders of "Garage Cultural" in Detroit, Michigan.

In 1990, Ismael returned with his family to Michigan, where he launched several community initiatives with concerts and music and art classes for the immigrant community of Southwest Detroit. He opened a cultural center in the early nineties with the support of Holy Redeemer Catholic church, and, along with Chilean chef Roberto Cáceres, opened a Spanish restaurant called "Don Ricardo's". In 1995 and 1999 he organized musical tours throughout the United States and Canada with the group Congreso. In the late 1990s, he supported the return to Chile of his son Vicente, who became known as a rapper by his stage name SubVerso, and opened a restaurant-peña called Bandolero in Barrio Brasil. In 2011, he and his daughter Amelia founded the Garage Cultural community center, which is dedicated to fostering Latin American cultural activity in Detroit. In the 2010s he frequently played alongside his grandson Gabriel Durán, who accompanied him on guitar, percussion and vocals, and later formed a band with other immigrant musicians called "Comparsa Sur".

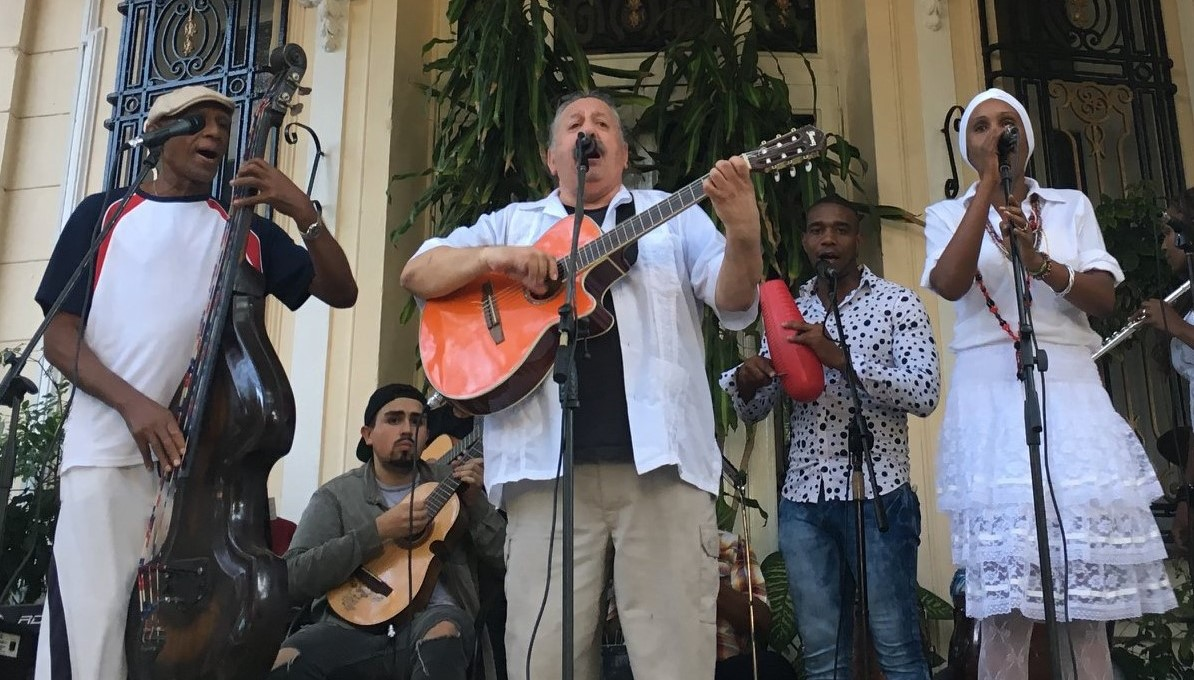
Singing with Manguaré in Cuba.

During his time in Michigan, "Bandolero" continued to tour Latin America and the Caribbean, Europe and Australia. He was invited several times to the Cubadisco music festival in Havana, organizing exchanges with artists and activists from Chile and the United States against the U.S. blockade of the island. He actively participated in international solidarity with the families of the 43 missing students from Ayotzinapa, Mexico. He also supported the community organization "La Peña del Bronx", founded by two former political prisoners of the MIR, Victor Toro and Nieves Ayress.

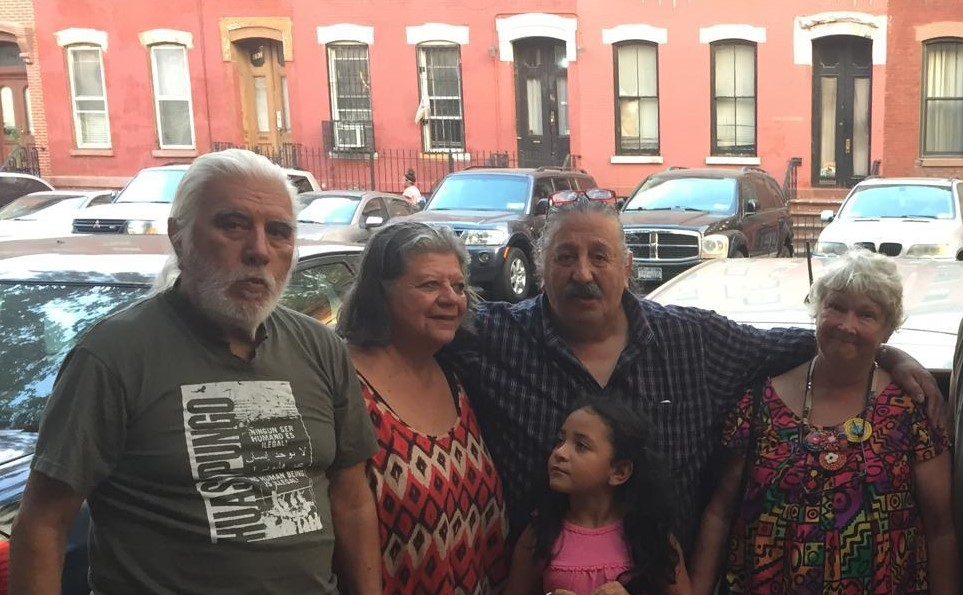
With his wife Mary Clare (right), Nieves Ayress and Victor Toro (left) in the Bronx, New York.

Ismael "Bandolero" Durán died of cancer on October 5, 2021, in Detroit.
