= José Tlatelpas =

Mexican artist and activist

Jose Tlatelpas (born 1953 in Mexico City) is a Mexican poet, essayist, visual artist, journalist, publisher, writer and political activist for civil rights. He lives in Mexico City and Vancouver, British Columbia. He has been a director of several cultural and political magazines since 1972, such as Nueva Generación (1972), Gaceta Politécnica de Literatura y Redacción (1981), La Guirnalda Polar (since 1996) and Poder Popular (since 2008).

Among other places, he gave workshops for the INBA (National Institute of Fine Arts and Literature) in Mexico, the ENEP Acatlan University; abroad, he conducted workshops in CLAVES Latinoamericanas and the Circulo de Escritores Latinoamericanos in Vancouver, Canada, and other places.

In 1985, he was a coordinator of Maiz Rebelde] a cultural group of the Movimiento Revolucionario del Pueblo along with artists and activists such as Mario Ramírez, José Hernández Delgadillo, José de Molina, Benito Balam, and others. Among their many works, they published "Desde los Siglos del Maiz Rebelde" (1987), a poetry anthology with an introduction by Horacio Caballero.

== Poetry ==
English:

- Canadian panorama, The Coyote Sen Klip Recordings, audiobook, music by America Mestiza, Xavier Quijas, Lindsay Kenyon on YouTube and Susane Morgan, English, Vancouver, 1991.
- Sprouting from the Light, collective, poetry, Neoclassic E Press, Vancouver, English, Canada, 1991.

Spanish:

- Miriam Barrios o La Huilotita Mañanera, Ediciones del Coyote Esquivo, Spanish, Mexico, 1979.
- El Chalchihuite de Tlatepas, Sawarabi Supansha, Spanish, Kyoto, 1981.
- Poemas desde el Piso o INBATextos a las poetisas fermosas, Ediciones del Coyote Esquivo, Spanish, Mexico, 1985.

El libro Rojo del 68, by Mario Ramírez, Leopoldo Ayala and José Tlatelpas, a virtual version of the book commemorating the 40th anniversary of the student genocide in Tlatelolco, Mexico Canada, Spanish, 2008.

- Coro de llamas para el Che, collective of poetry about Che Guevara, published by Editorial Cibertaria, Spanish, Mexico, 2008.

== Visual arts ==
Some artwork by José Tlatelpas in the Abibi Art Gallery at Bluecanvas.
