= SubVerso (rapper) =

Chilean rapper (born 1975)

- Born: Vicente Leonardo Durán Carolan; September 16, 1975 (age 50); Paris, France
- Other names: SubVerso
- Occupations: Rapper; singer; songwriter
- Years active: 1990's - present
- Father: Ismael Durán

Vicente Leonardo Durán Carolan (born 16 September 1975), better known by his musical nickname, SubVerso, is a Chilean rapper and singer-songwriter. He has gained fame due to the lyrical content of his songs, which usually include themes alluding to Chilean politics from a leftist perspective.

== Biography ==
He was born on the 16th of September 1975 to the popular singer Ismael Durán, and his wife, Mary Clare Carolan, in Paris, France. When he was two months old, his family moved to Detroit, where he spent the majority of his childhood. In 1985, at 10 years of age, he visited Chile, where he saw the contrast between different Chilean social classes.

Even though he was originally interested in poetry, when he moved to Chile in 1996, he began to experiment with rap music in various recording studios. Between 2004 and 2005, he formed the band CoN$PiRaZioN, with which he published his album "¡Apaga la Tele!" in 2006. In 2011, he dedicated various songs to the then-ongoing Chilean student protests, which turned him into an icon in the eyes of the protesters.

in 2012, he collaborated with Portavoz, another Chilean rapper, in the song "Donde Empieza", from the album titles "Escribo Rap con R de Revolución". in 2013, he dedicated a rap to the Mapuche people, again collaborating with Portavoz.

In January 2014, he came back to Chile for a short amount of time, after which he moved to Detroit, his current city of residence.
