= Sr. Gonzalez =

Mr.Gonzalez
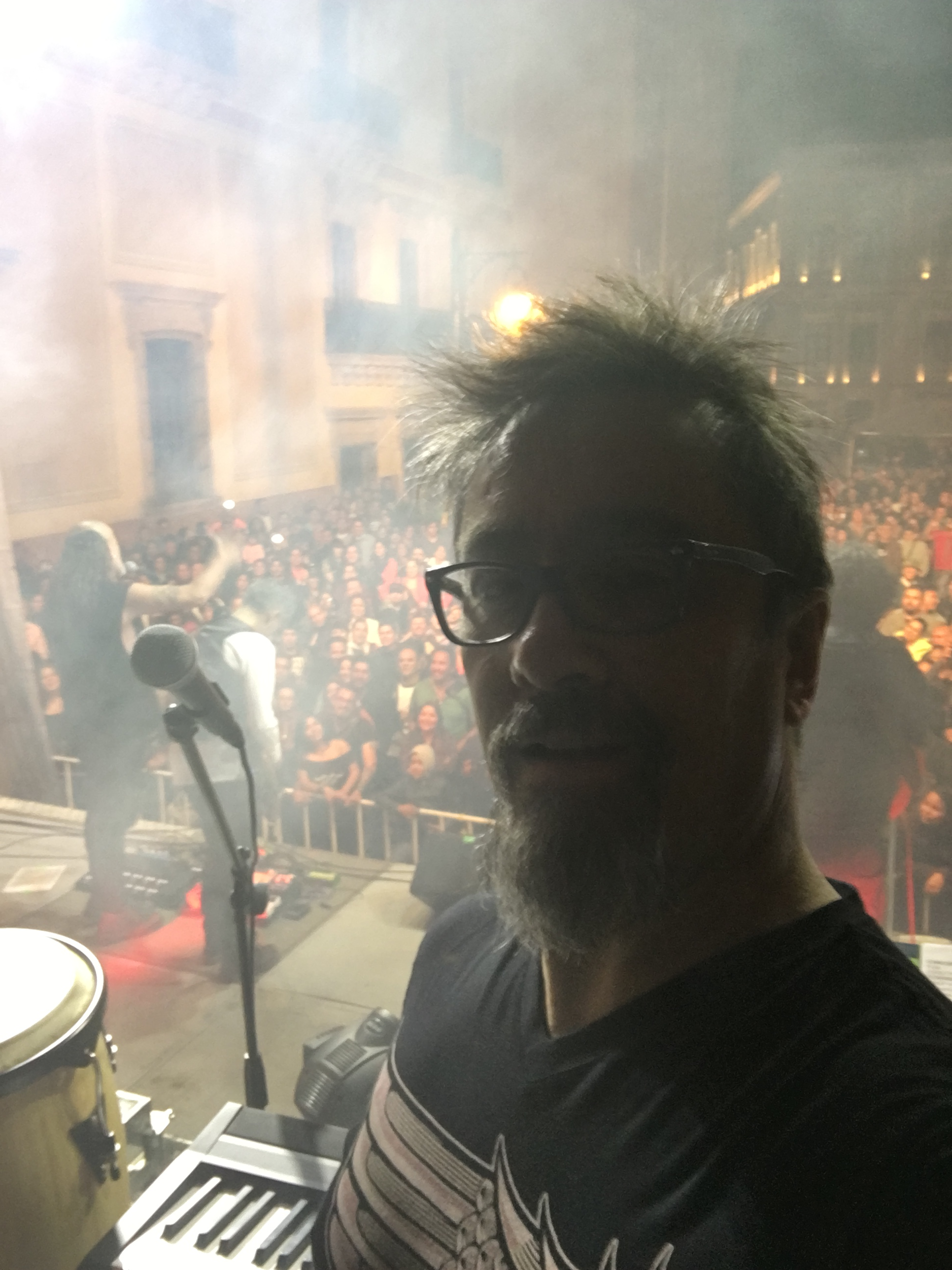
- Mr. González. Selfie at a Botellita de Jerez concert in the city of Zacatecas, on June 24, 2016, Zacatecas.

Background information
- Born: Rafael González Villegas; 8 July 1962
- Origin: Mexico City
- Instrument: Vocals

Sr. González (born in Mexico City on July 8, 1962) is a Mexican rock musician and as a chronicler and encyclopedist of the scene. He becomes known as a member of Botellita de Jerez, where he collaborated on keyboards, drums, and vocals. He has also participated with bands such as Cafe Tacvba, Tex-Tex, Julieta Venegas, Fratta, among others, and made 7 albums as a soloist, which is why he is considered one of the greats of Spanish rock music of the 90s. He has published biographical books, such as Mi Vida Pop, published by the Ministry of Public Education in Mexico, SEP, and distributed in the library network of the Mexican Republic. He is also known for his work documenting the scene, with the trilogy 60 Years of Mexican Rock.

== Personal life ==
Born in Mexico City, he completed his primary and secondary education, during childhood and adolescence, in the United States, Peru and Venezuela in the 60s and 70s. Mr. González is a recognized musician among Spanish rock fans.

== Studies ==
In 1981, he entered the Universidad Iberoamericana, in Mexico, where he studied architecture.

== Musical career ==
Composer and multi-instrumentalist, he started playing progressive rock in a band called Parthenon, in Caracas Venezuela. He later performed pop rock in a project known as Baraja. Later, he joined the group Botellita de Jerez, at the same time he collaborated with Fratta, with Café Tacuba, with Julieta Venegas, with Tex Tex, and with Kenny y los Eléctricos.

With Botellita de Jerez he recorded the albums "Niña de Mis Ojos" (1989), "Busca Amor" (1991), " Forjando Patria" (1994), "Superespecial Desenchufado" (1996) and "El Último Guacarock" (1997) for the transnational labels Polygram and BMG Ariola. In a second stage, they released the album "#NoPinchesMames" during 2015.

In 1998 he released his first author album, titled El Sr. González y los Cuates de la Chamba, the song "Burbujas de Jabón" was at #1 on MTV Latin America's Billboard. Also, the video for the song "Escribiéndole" received an award at the Festival Pantalla de Cristal (Cristal Screen Festival). This album is part of the book "100 Essential Records of Mexican Rock", and also in "Doscientos Discos Chingones del Rocanrol Mexicano" (Dos Hundred Cool Discs of Mexican Rock)". Mr. González affirms that his motivation to create, more than money, is the love of music.

In 2000, he published his second album titled La Vida es el Viaje, a rock and pop production. Her third production was presented in 2004, the album called Rompecabezas, with which she "shows what he thinks about life and music". In 2007, he released the album Retrato Hablado, with which he achieved a compilation of pop, rock, material from his own record label Antídoto. The same year, and in the spirit of independent productions, El Grao appears, an album that is not sold, but rather given away, in a "musical guerrilla" against the establishment. After winning a battle with lymphatic cancer, Mr. González presented the albums Un Mundo Frágil, in 2011, and in 2014, Surviviente de mí. Fortunately, this artist is living proof that sometimes cancer is curable. After eight chemotherapies, and a bone marrow transplant, the musician managed to affirm "I am healthy", and present his album on a live show.

Currently, Mr. González together with the singer Zaira Franco present their project titled ' Combo Movox '. They debuted in December 2018. From 2019 to date, in the context of the pandemic, their single "Dar amor" proposes being loving in the face of adversity. During 2023, they launch the production titled "El Álbum".

== Discography ==
With Botellita de Jerez

- Niña de Mis Ojos (1989)
- Busca Amor (1991)
- Forjando Patria (1994)
- Superespecial Desenchufado (1996)
- El Último Guacarock (1997)
- #NoPinchesMames (2015)

As a soloist:

- El Sr. Gonzalez y los Cuates de la Chamba (1998)
- La Vida es el Viaje (2000)
- Rompecabezas (2004)
- Retrato Hablado (2007)
- Verdades o Mentiras / El Grao (2007)
- Un Mundo Frágil (2011)
- Así Suena MDMAR (2013)
- Superviviente de mí (2014)

With Combo Movox

- The Album (2023)

== Writer ==
Mr. González has published several titles such as Mi Vida Pop and the trilogy 60 Años De Rock Mexicano.

In 60 Years of Mexican Rock, he recounts an experience as a member of the Spanish rock scene, while listing the work of hundreds of artists. He considers that the history of Mexican rock has gone against the grain, but it is nevertheless important to document it, which is why he made an effort to publish the trilogy that covers the years from 1956 to 2016. Thanks to this experience, the author states that:

I used to think that the history of Mexican rock was full of missing links, but the truth is that everything is connected. Things happen in reaction to what happened. That there are now bands making rock with the characteristics they possess is not just for nothing. It is not by spontaneous generation, there was a before.

This work has been very well received by the rock community in Mexico.

== Published books ==
From the authorship of Mr. González

- My Pop Life. First edition (2011) ISBN 978-607-95512-2-3. Second edition (2013) ISBN 978-607-514-677-5
- 60 Years of Mexican Rock, Volume I (1956–1979) (2016) ISBN 978-607-529-063-8
- 60 years of Mexican rock, vol. II (1980–1989) (2018) ISBN 978-607-316-907-3
- 60 years of Mexican rock, volume III (1990–2016) (2019)

== See also ==
- Mexican Rock
- Botellita de Jerez
