= Florencio Medrano Mederos =

- Born: October 27, 1945; Limón Grande, Guerrero, Mexico
- Died: March 26, 1979 (aged 33); San Juan Quiotepec, Oaxaca, Mexico
- Cause of death: Gunshot wound
- Political party: United Proletarian Party of America
- Other political affiliations: Revolutionary Party of the Mexican Proletariat
- Spouse: Elvia Franco García
- Military career
- Allegiance: United Popular Liberation Army of America
- Service years: 1973–1979
- Conflicts: Mexican Dirty War

Florencio Medrano Mederos (27 October, 1945 – 26 March, 1979), better known as Florencio "El Güero" Medrano, was a Mexican peasant leader, social activist, and Maoist guerilla fighter active in the 1970s during the Mexican Dirty War. He is known for being the founder and leader of the "Rúben Jaramillo" Proletarian Colony in the state of Morelos and for being a leader of the United Popular Liberation Army of America.

== Early life ==
Florencio "El Güero" Medrano was born on October 27, 1945 in the locality of Limón Grande in the state Guerrero into a peasant family. He was one of the seven children of Ángel Medrano Núñez and Joaquina Mederos Ocampo. During his childhood, the family moved to the locality of Palmar Grande, in the municipality of Tlatlaya, Estado de México. Here, the Medrano family experienced great poverty and conflicts with the local political authorities, including an occasion in which Florencio Medrano and his father were hanged upside down from a tree by the local military forces for hours due to their family ties with some peasants who were disputing agrarian conflicts with the local political authorities.

Because of these living conditions, at the age of 16, Medrano decided to move to Mexico City alongside his sister. He was unable to find a job, and moved to the city of Cuernavaca in the state of Morelos, where he remained until 1963, when at the age of 18 he decided to enlist in the Mexican army as part of the presidential guard. During his career in the army, Medrano gained firearm experience and learnt to read and write; he later decided to leave the military due to his disagreement with their procedures.

After his time in the army, back in the locality of Palmar Grande, Medrano joined a group of peasants that organized and attempted to forcefully take possession of some land. They failed and were evicted and arrested by the military on May 27, 1966. By the June 2 of that same year, however, due to an intervention by the Independent Peasants Union Campesina (Central Campesina Independiente), the group of peasants, including Medrano, was set free. By 1967, Medrano decided to move back to Cuernavaca. In this city, he met and became friends with Rafael Equihua Palomares, a peasant and an active figure in the local politics of the region. Through him, Medrano eventually met a member of the Revolutionary Party of the Mexican Proletariat (RPMP), a Maoist party, which both Medrano and Equihua would soon find themselves joining.

== Revolutionary Party of the Mexican Proletariat ==
By 1969, the Revolutionary Party of the Mexican Proletariat had around a dozen members in both Mexico City and Cuernavaca. In order to develop the political line of the organization, Javier Fuentes Gutiérrez, one of the leaders of the RPMP, decided to have the members of the party, including Medrano, take a trip from May to December of that same year to the People's Republic of China. The Chinese embassy funded the trip. On their arrival in China, they were received by a group of military personnel and interpreters who took them to the city of Nanjing to receive political and military training. After his experience in China, Medrano, alongside the rest of members of the RPMP, became convinced of the Maoist doctrine and was eager to establish a revolutionary project in line with his political vision on Mexican territory. However, soon afterwards the Federal Security Directorate captured and tortured a group of members of the Comité de Lucha Revolucionaria, who gave information on the members of the RPMP and the members of the Mexico City cell of the party were ambushed and imprisoned.

This event marked the end of the RPMP, however, in 1972, Medrano, who had escaped to the locality of Acatlipa in the municipality of Temixco in order to avoid capture, decided to continue by himself. During this time period, Medrano organized talks and meetings with the local peasant population, and distributed Maoist literature amongst the population such as Quotations from Chairman Mao Zedong.

== Rúben Jaramillo Proletarian Colony ==
=== Foundation of the colony ===
Soon after beginning his meetings with the local population, Medrano was told about an issue in which the local government had taken away and occupied plots of land. These plots were mostly located on the outskirts of Acatlipa and had been taken by the family of Morelos governor, Felipe Rivera Crespo, who were planning to use them to build a housing development of vacation homes, with the name of Villa de las Flores. After hearing this story, Medrano spent weeks analyzing the situation, investigating the legal status and the geographic and hydrographic conditions of these plots of lands before taking a decision. He decided to take possession of the property and divide it into lots then give them away to people who lacked a home or a place to live.

On March 31, 1976, Medrano along with a group of people convinced by him, invaded the plots of Villa de las Flores. By the next day, around 60 people, including Medrano's own family, had moved in. During the next few days, pamphlets were printed and distributed in various towns in the state of Morelos incentivizing unhoused people to join the occupation and promising them plots of lands. By April 2, 1976, around 300 families inhabited the terrain, some coming from as far away as the state of Guerrero.

=== Governmental opposition to the colony ===
From the very first days of the land occupation, the colony met with opposition. On April 6, 1973, the governor of Morelos Felipe Rivera Crespo told the local press: “They can stay there as long as they pay me ten pesos per meter of land; otherwise, I have enough power to have them removed.” By the second week, a representative of the state government arrived in the town with the intention of speaking with the leaders; however, upon arrival he was intercepted by the settlers who were guarding the entrance and would not let him through. The official demanded that they leave the property, saying: “Would you like it if someone tried to break into your house?”, to which one of the settlers, replied: “Well, your example doesn’t apply to us because remember that none of us has a house—that’s why we’re here.”

Although Rivera Crespo was advised by his close circle to use the military in order to clear the terrain, he decided that confronting such an amount of people would be difficult and decided to try other methods. On May 12, 1973, Rivera Crespo tried to sneak undercover along with general secretary of the Cuernavaca Single Union of Garment Industry Workers, Jesús Adame Giles, and a few of his bodyguards. They were discovered by the settlers, and the governor was forced to sign documents in which he recognized the legal status of the plots of lands of each of the settlers, as well as an article prohibiting the sale of alcohol near the colony, since the settlers had agreed to make the colony an alcohol-free zone. Rivera Crespo continued to harass the settlers during the following days.

=== Consolidation of the Rúben Jaramillo Proletarian Colony ===
During the following weeks, the colony grew. The name Colonia Proletaria Rúben Jaramillo (Rúben Jaramillo Proletarian Colony) was chosen in honor of peasant leader Rúben Jaramillo, and a commission called Comité de Lucha (struggle committee) was established in order to better organize the distribution of land. The whole of the terrain was divided into 200 m^{2} (2,200 sq ft) plots and these were distributed among the people who had begun to arrive, so long as they fulfilled two conditions: that they were people who clearly had nowhere to live and that they settled on the land within 72 hours. As soon as they arrived, those who asked for a plot were investigated, and if the commission found out they had lied, the land could be taken away and given to someone else.

By June of 1973, in order to ensure that the members of the colony would commit to the measures that had been established, a decision was made to draft a set of internal regulations. The one-page document, which was printed using a mimeograph machine donated by the independent Nissan union of Morelos, was distributed among the residents, who signed it to demonstrate their commitment to the organization. The document contained the following:

Colonia Proletaria Rúben Jaramillo

Given my financial circumstances and the fact that I did not own a piece of land on which to build a home for my children, I applied for a lot in this neighborhood, accepting the following conditions:

1. To submit to an investigation to verify that I do not own any lot, house, or material assets that would prevent me from receiving such benefits, and, if I do own any, to accept the responsibility and the charges that the Comité de Lucha imposes in this case.
2. To fulfill the obligations—such as patrol duty, community service in the colony, personal contributions, etc.—that the Comité de Lucha deems appropriate for the smooth operation and progress of the colony.
3. I agree to the following rules regarding my lot: I may not sell it, rent it, lend it, transfer it, or pawn it, as it is my property and part of my children’s future; should I violate these rules, I agree to be expelled from the neighborhood.
4. I accept as my rights within the neighborhood the freedom of expression, freedom of thought, freedom of constructive criticism, freedom from personal attacks, and the right to speak and vote in both meetings and assemblies.
5. I may not consume, bring into the neighborhood, or sell within it any alcoholic beverages or intoxicating substances, and if I do, I will be expelled from this small patrimony
6. Any transaction I enter into without the consent of the Comité de Lucha is null and void, and if I do so, I will be expelled from my small patrimony.

By July of 1973, the colony had as many as 15,000 inhabitants, and had consolidated itself as a working-class town with a strong political presence in the region, with implications and influence even at the national level. During this period, it received support from various political and peasant civic organizations. It was visited by important figures, such as the bishop of Cuernavaca Sergio Méndez Arceo and singer-songwriter José de Molina, whom Medrano would later convince to lend his support to the United Popular Liberation Army of the Americas and who would later write a corrido in honor of Medrano, titled Corrido a Florencio Medrano.

=== Military intervention and fall of the Rúben Jaramillo Proletarian Colony ===
On the night of September 28, 1973, over 1,000 troops, under the command of Brigadier General Francisco Andrade Sánchez, alongside over 100 members of the judicial police force raided the Rubén Jaramillo Proletarian Colony with the aim of arresting the leaders of the Comité de Lucha, who had a few days prior, while on a trip to buy corn, fought with the local police forces. As soon as the soldiers began entering the colony, they set about conducting searches inside the houses, dragging the residents out of their huts and herding all the settlers into a single area in order to search for the leaders of the Comité de Lucha and arrest them.

Medrano, alongside various members of the Comité de Lucha, managed to escape to the town of Tenancigo, Estado de Mexico. After the raid, students of the National Autonomous University of Mexico protested, demanding the military ceased their activities in the colony and asking the university rector to take a stand against what had happened, with the purpose of securing the release of their imprisoned fellow students who had been detained. The clergy of Morelos, under the leadership of Sergio Méndez Arceo, staged a series of protests. On September 29, 1973, bishop Méndez Arceo requested the state government of Morelos' prompt intervention to resolve the problem and personally contacted governor Felipe Rivera Crespo, asking him to ensure that all detainees were treated “well.”

Nevertheless, although the settlers expressed their opposition towards the military intervention, the situation became increasingly complicated, and despite the petitions, resistance, and displays of solidarity calling for the soldiers to leave the town, military forces remained stationed in the region until September of 1980. Although during these seven years, many settlers would leave, those who remained in the colony managed to organize themselves and with the support of students as well as other social movements, succeeded—through the direct intervention of the federal government— in having their land titles regularized. However, the military siege had ensured a complete lack of political participation and organization, and, as a result, the situation of resistance and communal self-management that the settlement had initially experienced gradually disappeared.

== United Proletarian Party of America ==
Following the events in the Rúben Jaramillo Proletarian Colony, there was a failed plan to retake the colony. After a failed attempt to contact Lucio Cabañas, in April 1974, Medrano, exiled in Tenancingo, Estado de México along with several other of his followers, decided to form a new party by the name Partido Proletario Unido de América (United Proletarian Party of America), which along with its armed branch, the Ejército Popular de Liberación Unido de America (United Popular Liberation Army of America), began a series of armed struggles against the Mexican government.

Under this new organization, Medrano and his party received support from numerous guerrilla groups in South America, primarily the Revolutionary Left Movement, the People’s Revolutionary Army, the National Liberation Movement-Tupamaros, and the National Liberation Army of Bolivia. The group also received weapons through the support of militants from the Raza Unida Party in the United States. During this period, it mostly financed its actions through illegal activities such as bank robberies and the kidnapping of prominent figures.

Medrano and the United Popular Liberation Army of America also organized with other local armed movements in the region. In November, 1975, the United Popular Liberation Army of America met with the remaining survivors of the Party of the Poor, an armed movement that had recently been disbanded, in Puente de Ixtla, Morelos, in order to plan the kidnapping of Élfego Coronel Ocampo. This took place on December 25, 1975 and the group claimed responsibility under the name of Organización Comandos Armados Revolucionarios de Morelos (Organized Revolutionary Armed Commands of Morelos).

On early January of 1976, the second congress of the United Proletarian Party of America took place in Puebla, to which various people from different parts of Mexico assisted, and the general policy guidelines of the party were established. After this congress, Medrano started planning the organization of an armed insurrection in the region of Oaxaca and arrived in the city of San Juan Bautista Tuxtepec later that same month alongside his wife, Elvia Franco García, and 10 peasants. Soon, on the 31st of that same month, and after a bank robbery perpetrated by Medrano and his group, the Federal Security Directorate (DFS) started taking note of Medrano's activities in the region and his affiliations with the bishop Sergio Mendez Arceo, who had served as an intermediary on many of the United Popular Liberation Army of America kidnappings and was investigated itself by the DFS.

In the time period between 1976 and 1978, the region of Oaxaca experienced numerous student protests, armed guerrilla movements, and political instability due to factors external to Medrano's intervention. However, Medrano and the United Popular Liberation Army of America quickly took action. By August of 1976, the news of Medrano's arrival to the region quickly began to spread. After a failed attempt to crash a private light aircraft in which the governor of Veracruz was travelling, Medrano's group soon arrived at the town of Francisco Villa, in the municipality of Santiago Yaveo, distributing arms amongst the peasants, and incentivizing them to rise up. Due to his activities in the region, many peasants joined his ranks, including members of the Unión General de Organizaciones Campesina de México (General Union of Peasant Organizations in Mexico).

== Death ==
In October 1978, Medrano gave an interview to the Revista de Revistas magazine, which alerted the Mexican military to his location.

Federal Security Directorate file on Florencio Medrano and his need for arrest.

By November 21, 1978, the Federal Security Directorate noted in a file that although the United Popular Liberation Army of America posed "no threat", Mederos had to be arrested in order to "prevent more serious consequences".

On March 24, 1979, in the municipality of San Pedro Yólox in Oaxaca, an armed clash broke out between a group of the United Popular Liberation Army of America, in which Medrano found himself in, and the Mexican military. During this confrontation, Medrano received a gunshot wound to the abdomen. It is unclear what day Medrano's death occurred, but according to the reports given by the Federal Security Directorate, after escaping the confrontation, by March 26, 1979, Medrano was found dead in the municipality of San Juan Quiotepec, Oaxaca as a result of the gunshot wound.

== Impact ==
After the military intervention in the Rúben Jaramillo Proletarian colony, though many of the original settlers would leave, those who remained in the colony managed to organize themselves and would eventually have their land titles regularized by the federal government. As of 2026, numerous people continue to live in the settlement, which has by now been recognized by the local authorities and the federal government which has provided public works such as paved streets and water wells. Throughout the colony, murals depicting Florencio "El Güero" Medrano can also be seen.
