= Ana María Miranda =

Chilean musician (born 1949)

- Born: Ana María Miranda Urbina; 21 March 1949 (age 77); Santiago, Chile
- Occupation: Musician
- Years active: 1980s – Onward
- Website: www.anamariamiranda.com (in Spanish)

Ana María Miranda Urbina (Note: In this Spanish name, the first or paternal surname is Miranda and the second or maternal family name is Urbina.) (born 21 March 1949) is a Chilean musician and political activist. She gained fame during the military dictatorship of Chile, where she participated in various musical collaborations with the armed resistance.

== Biography ==
Ana María Miranda was born on 21 March 1949, to Braulio Miranda and Olga Urbina. She joined the Symphonic Choir of the University of Chile between 1968 and 1970, and studied advertising at the Technical University of the State.

She worked in the Administrative Headquarters in the Ministry of Education during the presidency of Salvador Allende, where she met Sergio Ortega, a fellow musician. She later married and had her only son with him, Chañaral Ortega-Miranda.

After the 1973 Chilean coup, she moved to France, where she recorded several songs in exile, some with the collaboration of Ortega and Claudio Iturra.

She returned to Chile in 1978, and joined the armed resistance in Chile, singing in towns, prisons, and festivals. This is when she collaborated on the album Chile ríe y canta, sang with René Largo Farías, and published her first album, Miranda al Frente, which she dedicated to the Manuel Rodríguez Patriotic Front.

In 1988, she helped found the Dignity and Justice Movement. In 1993, she participated in a show with Sergio Ortega singing La Gran Traición at the Universidad de Chile Theater.

In 2005, two years after the death of Sergio Ortega, she recorded the album Arderá al Viento tu Canción in his honor.

She currently resides in Buenos Aires, Argentina.

== Discography ==
- 1987 – Miranda al Frente
  1. Soy Mujer
  2. Que No Se Los Lleve El Humo
  3. Yo Te Nombro Libertad (originally performed by Gian Franco Pagliaro)
  4. Chile Resistencia (originally performed by Inti-Illimani)
  5. Himno de Las Milicias Rodriguistas
  6. Himno del Frente Patriótico Manuel Rodríguez (originally performed by Inti-Illimani and Patricio Manns)
  7. El Miliciano
  8. Libre Vendrás
  9. Y Va A Caer
  10. Por Ti Juventud (originally performed by Ismael Durán)
  11. Canción Por La Vida (originally performed by Pato Valdivia)
- 2005 – Arderá al Viento tu Canción
  1. Los Pájaros perdidos
  2. El Banderón
  3. Naranjo en flor
  4. Chanson des vieux amants
  5. Milonga de la anunciación
  6. Juana de Calama
  7. El último café
  8. Canción Posible
  9. Soneto
  10. A un semejante
  11. Gracias a pesar de todo
  12. Barcarola
  13. Volverás
