= Botellita de Jerez =

Mexican rock band

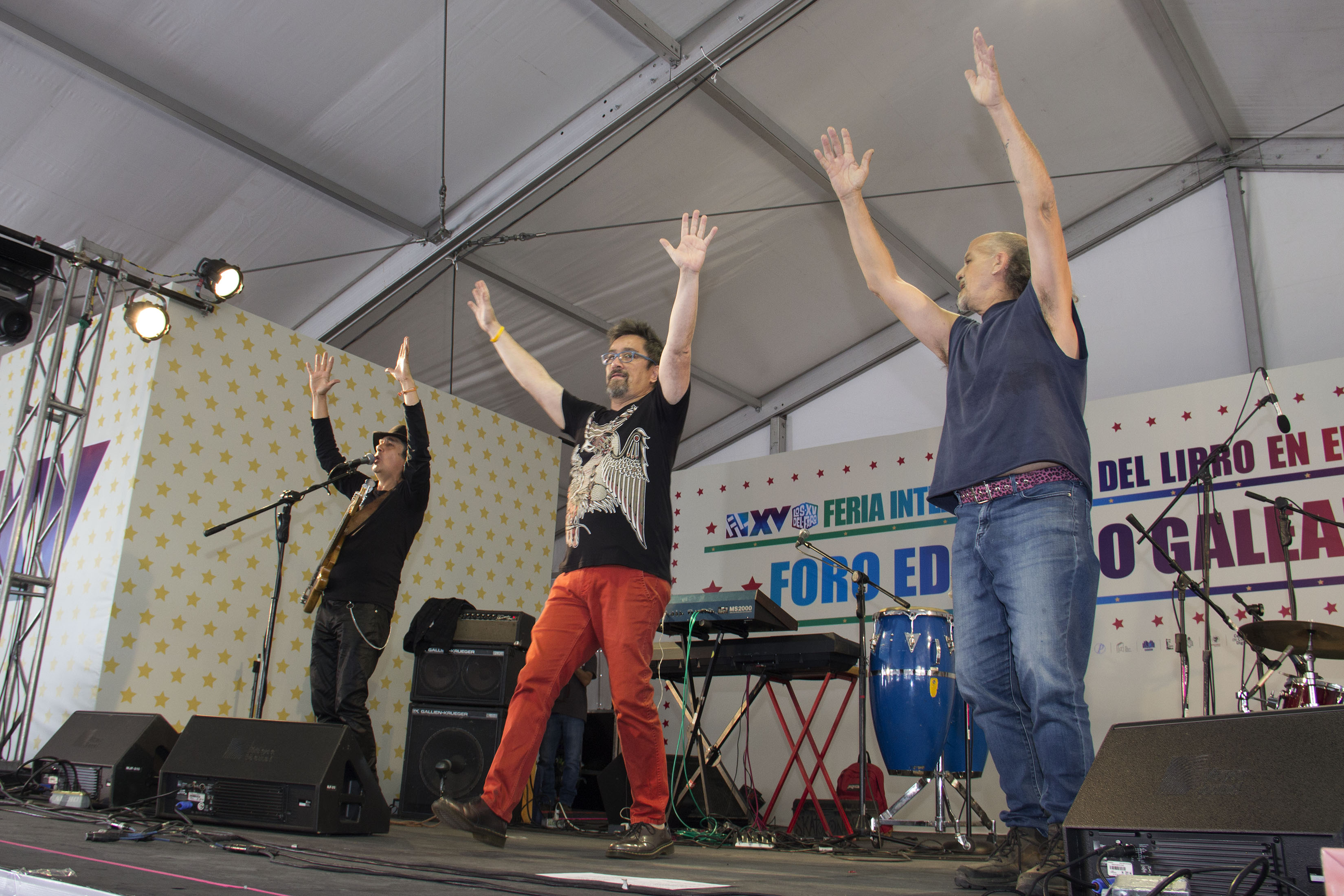
- The band in a concert in UNAM campi.

Background information
- Also known as: Botellos, Botellita
- Origin: México City, Mexico
- Genres: Rock, cumbia, son
- Years active: 1982-1997, 2005-2013
- Labels: Polygram, BMG
- Past members: Francisco Barrios (El Mastuerzo); Armando Vega Gil; Sergio Arau (El Uyuyuy); Santiago Ojeda; Benjamín Alarcón; Sr. González
- Website: http://www.botellitadejerez.com.mx

Botellita de Jerez was a Mexican rock band, formed in Mexico City in 1982. Their music is a fusion of rock, cumbia, and Mexican traditional music like mariachi and son, creating the genre called guacarrock (rock and guacamole). The band was always distinguished by a festive and irreverent musical fusion, celebrating the culture of the nacos and integrating sketches and albures in its lyrics and concerts. Its style, standard rock, was combined with satirical lyrics that portrayed urban life and popular culture in Mexico City.

In their song "Guaca Rock de la Malinche", they coined the phrase Todo lo naco es chido (Everything tacky is cool), trying to re-vindicate the popular culture of the lower socio-economic classes. Botellita de Jerez pioneered a lot of trends from contemporary art in Mexico and the United States, since it incorporated motifs from popular use, such as lucha libre, popular dances and slang, which are now commonly used among the upper classes as well.

The name of the band comes from a Mexican saying used as rebuttal in an argument: "Botellita de jerez, todo lo que me digas, será al revés", which literally means: "Bottle of sherry, all you say to me will be otherwise", equivalent to the English idiom "I'm rubber, you're glue, whatever you say bounces off me and sticks to you."

One of their most notable songs is "Niña de mis ojos" included in the LP of the same name, which has been released on the albums "El Ultimo Guacarrock" and "Superespecial Un Plug".

The signature songs of Botellita de Jerez are "Guacarrock", "El Guaca Rock de la Malinche", "Alarmala de Tos", "Oh Denny's" and "Abuelita de Batman" (The Granny of Batman) which became the first cumbia-rock of the rock band, the song is notable for its parody-music video filmed in Colonia Santa María la Ribera in Mexico City.

== Feature film ==
In 2010, Sergio Arau (known as his stage name of Uyuyuy within the band) directed a mockumentary entitled "Naco es Chido", detailing the aftermath of the band's fictional break-up and subsequent reunion (called "arrejunte"). All three members of the band star as themselves, along with interviews with various Mexican musicians and other personalities, including Carlos Monsivais (shortly before his death) and writer Laura Esquivel.

The film is a comedic homage to both the Botellita de Jerez act as well as its multi-generational fandom, combining real interviews, news reports, edited music videos and actual footage from the band's early years to tell their quasi-fictional story.

It was released to an overwhelmingly limited run in selected Mexican theaters, being neglected by major distributors and later made available in DVD to the public in either bootlegs or the band's self-produced copies.

In March 2013, the band announced that, after 30 years in the Mexican rock scene, Botellita de Jerez was over.

== Works ==
- Botellita de Jerez (1984)
- La Venganza del Hijo del Guacarock (1985)
- Naco es Chido (1987)
- Niña de mis Ojos (1989)
- Busca Amor (1990)
- Todo lo que digas será al revés (1992)
- Forjando Patria (1994)
- Superespecial Un Plug (1996)
- El Último Guacarrock (1998)
- Estuche de peluche (1999)

(Café Tacvba made a version of the Botellita de Jerez song "Alármala de tos".)
