= Manolo Betancur =

Colombian-born American baker and immigrant rights activist

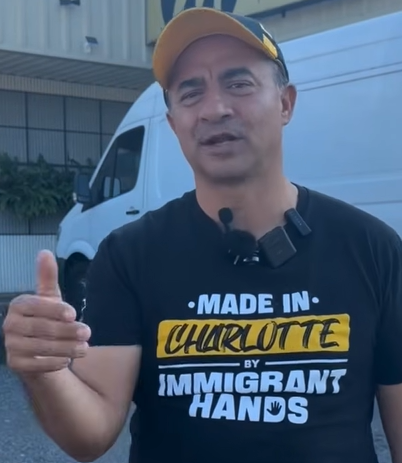
- Betancur in 2026
- Born: May 8, 1976 (age 50); El Carmen de Viboral
- Occupations: Baker, immigrant rights activist

Manolo Betancur (born 1976) is a Colombian-born American baker, immigrant rights activist, and veteran. He is best known for his businesses in Charlotte, North Carolina, where he also runs an immigrant rights nonprofit. He was named the 2021 USA Bread Hero by the Tiptree World Bread Awards. He gained national media attention after a confrontation with former Commander of the U.S. Border Patrol Gregory Bovino.

== Biography ==
Betancur was born in El Carmen de Viboral on May 8, 1976. He served in the Colombian Navy for six years before deciding to leave to avoid playing "a role in a corrupt war". He moved to Miami without much english knowledge, where a new friend from his church helped him enroll in King University. He studied modern languages, and afterwards began to work in a bakery, inspired by meeting farmworkers. He has since become a U.S. citizen.

In 2005, he began working at a Latin bakery in Charlotte, North Carolina, and became part owner in 2014. In 2017, he took over, renaming the place Manolo's Bakery. This bakery was twice named the #2 Cake Shop in the country by USA Today. Since 2013, he has donated birthday cakes to homeless Charlotte residents, and stated "We don't call them 'homeless'. They're our neighbors". He also provided free cakes to federal employees. During COVID-19, he donated more than 50,000 meals during the pandemic. He has also raised money to rebuild bakeries in Ukraine and personally visited Ukraine to aid bakers there.

During the 2025 Operation Charlotte's Web, it also became a prominent local gathering place for protests against the immigration crackdown. On the first day of the incident, he witnessed agents tackling people and immediately rushed to warn neighbors and customers. The bakery also closed for a week in this period, which he stated was for safety, saying "I don't want to risk my employees, and I don't want to risk my customers." In a federal lawsuit, he has alleged that this closure cost him more than $50,000 and claimed it was caused by the Border Patrol.

In 2026, he gained national media attention following his encounter with Gregory Bovino, who previously led Operation Charlotte's Web. In the encounter, Bovino and his videographer were refused entry to Manolo's Bakery by Betancur, and a tense exchange followed. The day after, he testified in front of the Charlotte City Council asking for more support for immigrants.

He was named the 2021 USA Bread Hero by the Tiptree World Bread Awards. He also owns three other businesses: The Changebaker Place, Artisen Gelato, and Higher Grounds. He runs nonprofit By Immigrant Hands, to support immigrants in the area. He is the subject of documentary The Changebaker.
