= León Chávez Teixeiro =

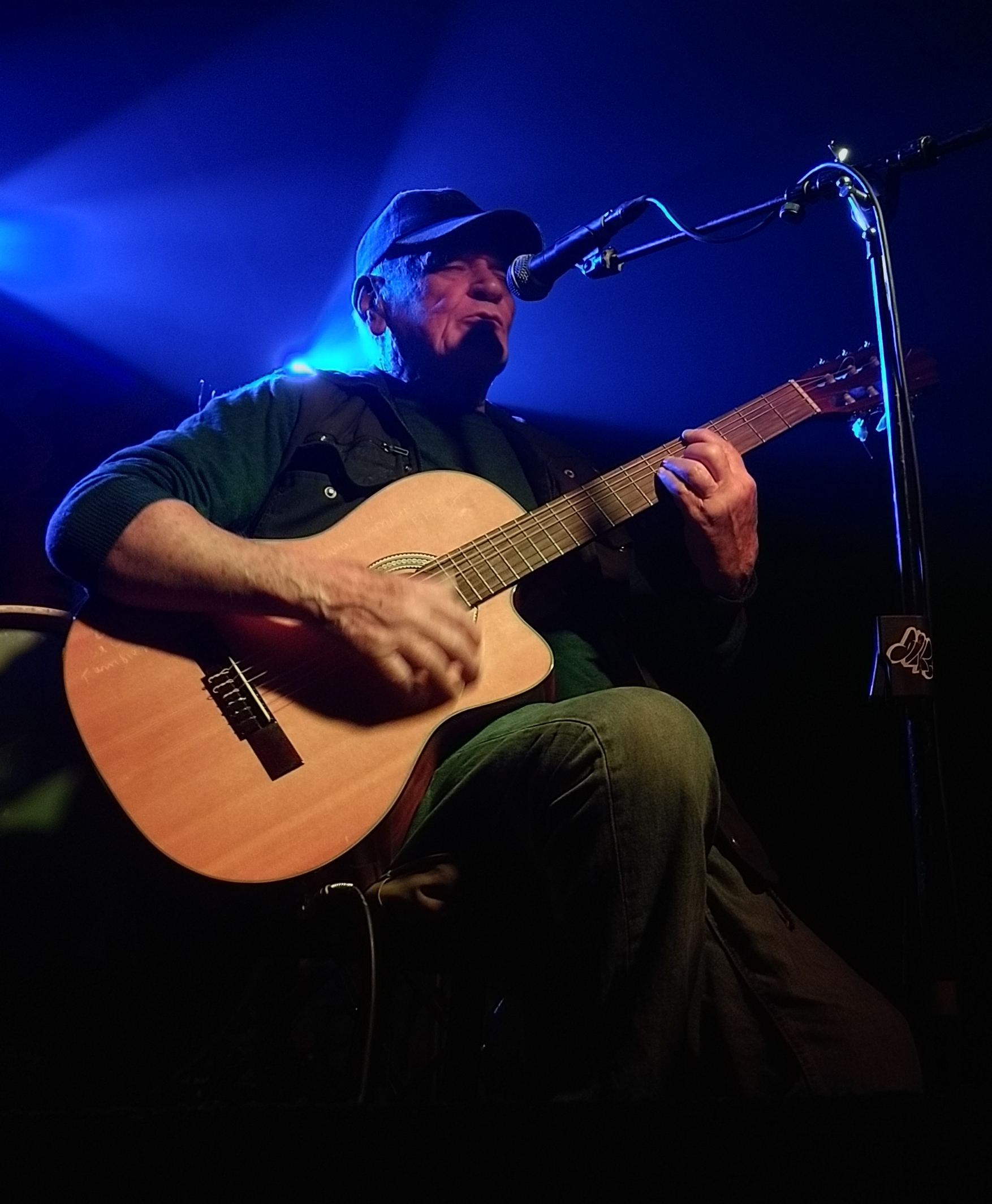
- León Chávez Teixeiro in 2018

Background information
- Born: Alfredo León Chávez y Teijeiro; April 11, 1936 (age 90); Mexico City, Mexico
- Genres: Protest song, folk, trova
- Instrument: Guitar

León Chávez Teixeiro (Mexico City, April 11, 1936) is a Mexican singer-songwriter activist and painter. He began the composition and interpretation of social justice songs campaigning both politically and musically different social movements.

== Biography ==
León Chávez Teixeiro was born on April 11, 1936 in Colonia Guerrero, Mexico City. Chávez Teixero was brought up in a working class environment, with his father, a member of labor movements such as Casa del Obrero Mundial, working as a mechanic while his mother dedicated herself to domestic activities. At the age of twelve, Chávez Teixero suffered an accident that led him to drop out of school, and thus forcing him to work on the streets selling candles, popsicles and sodas.

At that time he began to be a street musician. Due to his inclination to the urban environments, he began to be involved as an activist in resistance in housing movements as Movimiento inquilinario in the face of the accelerated urbanization of Mexico City. He was also involved with the Comité de Defensa Popular led by Rubén Aguilar and which started in Colonia Francisco Villa in Chihuahua. During the 60s, he was admitted to the Centro Universitario de Estudios Cinematográficos, the film school of the National Autonomous University of Mexico.

Around 1968 he founded, together with others and other artists, La Comuna de Sor Juana, an artistic commune in colonia Santa María la Ribera. It was in this place where he met Álvaro Guzmán Gómora, an artist and guitarist, and where Chávez Teixeiro made his first compositions as El Gato. There in this commune he found with Guzmán and other musicians the group La piel and listen to Bob Dylan for the first time.

He became involved in workers movements and in the 1968 Movement in Mexico accompanying public protests with his social justice songs. In that context Chávez participated as a cameraman in the crew of Leobardo López Aretche, filming the movement with materials that would appear in the further documentary El grito. México 1968, one of the few filmed materials of that episode.
