= Leobardo Pérez Jiménez =

Colombian artist

Leobardo Perez
- Born: Leobardo Perez Jimenez; September 22, 1945 (age 80); El Carmen de Viboral, Antioquia
- Known for: Painter, sculptor
- Spouse: Luz Elena Arango
- Children: Paola Perez Arango, Marcela Perez Arango, Leobardo Perez Arango, Tatiana Perez Arango

Leobardo Perez Jimenez (born September 22, 1945) is a Colombian abstract and figurative artist. He is a painter and sculptor.

== Gallery ==
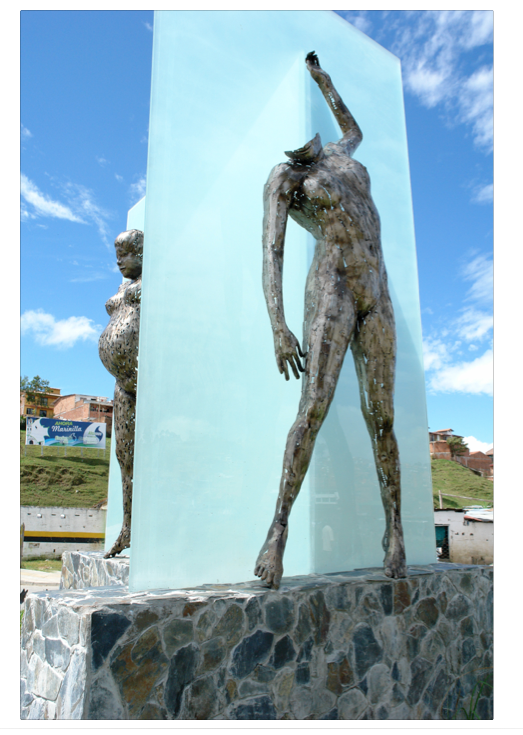

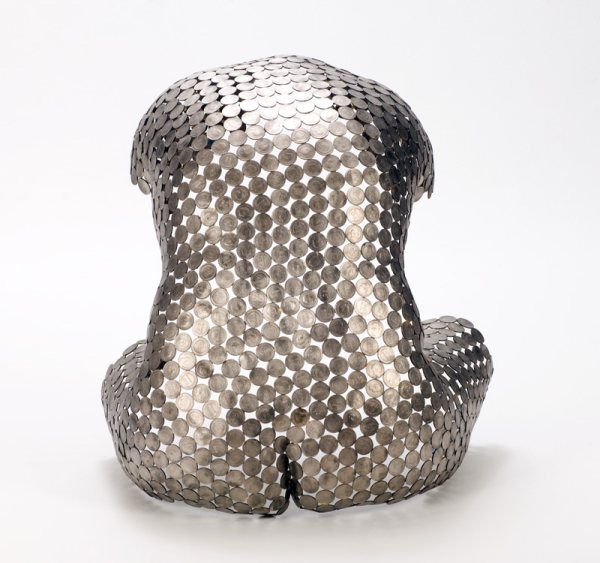

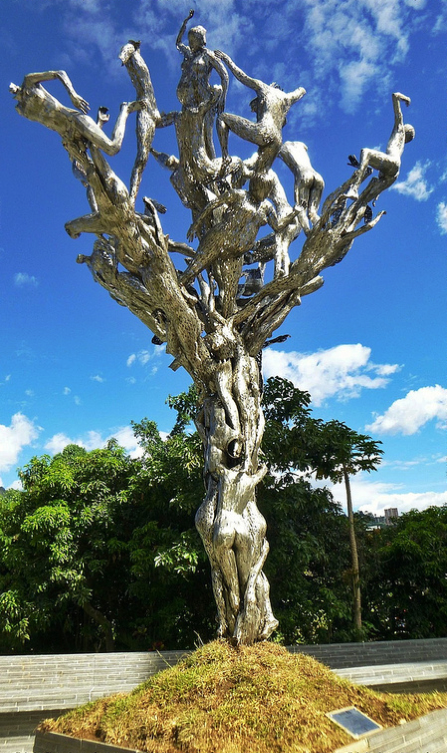

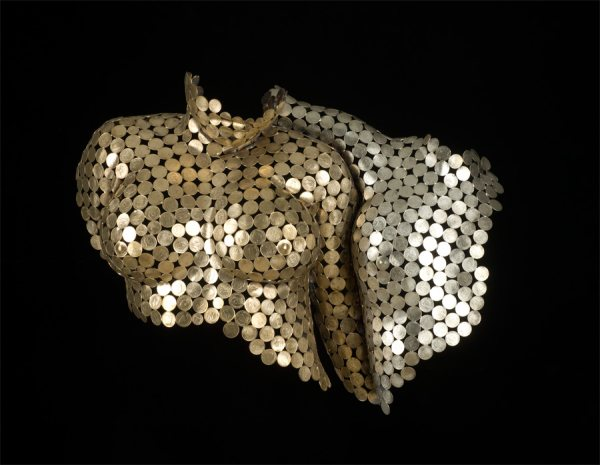
