= General Directorate of Political and Social Investigations =

- Dirección General de Investigaciones Políticas y Sociales

Intelligence and counterintelligence overview
- Formed: 1967; 59 years ago
- Preceding agencies: Sección Primera (1918–29); Departamento Confidencial (1929–39); Oficina de Información Política (1939–42); Departamento de Investigación Política y Social (1942–67)
- Dissolved: 1985
- Superseding Intelligence and counterintelligence: Centro de Investigación y Seguridad Nacional (México)
- Jurisdiction: Government of Mexico
- Headquarters: Mexico City
- Employees: Confidential
- Parent department: Secretariat of the Interior

The General Directorate of Political and Social Investigations (Spanish: Dirección General de Investigaciones Políticas y Sociales, DGIPS), was one of the two main domestic intelligence and security service of the United Mexican States. Created in 1918 as Sección Primera, under President Venustiano Carranza's administration, it reported directly to the office of the president. After the consolidation of the post-revolutionary Mexican political structure, and the rise of the Institutional Revolutionary Party (Spanish: Partido Revolucionario Institucional, PRI), its jurisdiction changed to that of the Mexican Secretariat of the Interior (Secretaria de Gobernación). In 1985, following a political crisis involving the death DEA agent (Enrique Camarena Salazar), the DGIPS was combined with its sister agency, the Federal Security Directorate (Spanish: Dirección Federal de Seguridad, DFS), creating the Center for Research and National Security (Centro de Investigación y Seguridad Nacional, CISEN) which is active to this day.

Created during the years of the Mexican Revolution, its function, structure and scope of research changed over the years. Alongside the DFS, during the period from 1968 to the late 1970s, the DGIPS was accused of illegal detentions, torture, assassinations and forced disappearances. At least 347 complaints were received by the United Nations related to Mexican State crimes from 1960 to 1980.

== Background ==
Intelligence services have always existed in Mexican history. During the pre-Columbian times, the Mexicas (aztecs) used "pochtecas" as political informants of the neighboring nations. These individuals would pretend to be merchants or merchant assistants, and travel to different areas to try and gather information on the number of warriors, changes in leadership or weather conditions. By the colonial times, the viceroyalty used the Inquisition and its network of informants as an informal form of rudimentary intelligence gathering service. Political and family alliances during the early years of the new Mexican nation were used as spies around the country. During the thirty year government of Porfirio Díaz (known as Porfiriato), infiltration into dissident political movements was common placed and it worked as a reliable intelligence service. The intelligence service active during the Porfiriato was disrupted by the eruption of new social and political conditions, derived from the ongoing revolutionary war. By 1914, most of the old government structure had been eliminated and replaced by a new, "revolutionary" equivalent, including the intelligence agencies.

== History ==
=== Mexican Revolution ===
After the defeat and exile of the ousted Mexican President, Victoriano Huerta, the different factions that fought in the Mexican Revolution gather in 1914 at what was called the Convention of Aguascalientes, in an attempt of creating a uniform political movement to govern the country. Yet, due to ideological differences, the Carranza delegation never arrived nor sent a representative, leaving the Zapata and Pancho Villa delegations in charge. Carranza refused to acknowledge the decisions taken at the Convention and faction wars broke up again. In 1916 he called for a Constituent Congress, which drafts the 1917 Mexican Constitution. Since the faction war was still active, Carranza created the Sección Primera as an intelligence agency in charge of investigating both the political enemies as well as allies. The agency started with twenty agents, all of them with a background in the police.

By 1929, after a series of rebellions, changes in political alliances and assassinations of mayor figures (the last one being the one of President elect Alvaro Obregón), the Sección Primera was reformed into the Departamento Confidencial. Its main focus of research changed from closed allies and enemies, to that of the whole political structure which included deputies, senators, governors and possible candidates. This coincides with the creation of the National Revolutionary Party (the predecessor of the current PRI) and the unification of the different political factions into one national program.

=== World War II ===
Following the political restructuration, economic reforms and industries nationalization that occurred during the Lazaro Cardenas’ administration, the DC was reformed again into the Oficina de Información Política. The focus of the intelligence services switch from threats from within the government to external rebellions, which came from conservative and religious factions, the first one from the urban areas and the latter from the rural areas of the county. As the European conflict escalated, the agency was reformed one more time, into the Departamento de Investigación Política y Social.

The DIPS was formed during the context of World War II, as an attempt to protect the national interest from those of the different international factions. The process of professionalization, which started in 1918, started to consolidate, with the security agency becoming more secretive and precise. The practice of infiltration within social and political movements started to grow as a standard practice. It's also a period of politicization within the DIPS, becoming more of a political tool for the PRI government than a police agency.

=== Cold War & Dirty War ===
During the times of the DIPS, the relationships between the Mexican and American intelligence agencies started working closely, with the U.S. "Hemispherical Defense” strategy being the guideline of the national security policy. This was a legacy of WWII and of the post-war escalation into the Cold War. After the triumph of the Cuban Revolution, and a growing regional tension in Latin-American, this strategy was change to that of defense against “internal subversion”. The threat no longer was the USSR invading the continent, but local dissidents overthrowing their respective governments and creating socialist countries. This change in strategy was visible in the shift of focus of the intelligence services in México, moving from external and conservative threats to left-wing politics, independent unions, peasant collectives and students movements.

=== The Camarena Incident and the reformation of the intelligence agencies ===
By the early eighties, the Mexican intelligence service, as well as the security services in general, had suffered a major backlash, product of the social mobilizations that demanded the appearance of disappeared people, as well as the liberation of political prisoners. By that time, the political and social environment had changed, and calls for reform were being heard. Still, the security and intelligence services hadn't adapted to the new times. During this time, since the counter guerilla activity had been on a considerable decline, most of the DGIPS and DFS agents got involved in the drug trafficking business.

In 1984, acting on information from Camarena, 450 Mexican soldiers backed by helicopters destroyed a 2,500 acres marijuana plantation with an estimated annual production of $8 billion known as "Rancho Búfalo". Camarena, who had been identified as the source of the leak, was abducted in broad daylight on February 7, 1985, by police officers working for drug lord Miguel Ángel Félix Gallardo. Camarena was tortured at Gallardo's ranch over a 30-hour period, then murdered. His body was found in a rural area outside the small town of La Angostura, in the state of Michoacán, on March 5, 1985.

Camarena's torture and murder triggered a rapid reaction from the DEA and launched the 'Operation Legend', the DEA's largest investigation. A special unit was sent to coordinate the investigation in Mexico. Investigators soon identified Miguel Ángel Félix Gallardo and his two closest collaborators: Ernesto Fonseca Carrillo and Rafael Caro Quintero, as the main suspects in the kidnapping. Under enormous pressure from the United States on the government of Mexico's President Miguel de la Madrid (1982-1988), Fonseca and Quintero were quickly arrested.

As a direct result of the Camarena Incident, the Mexican government was forced to admit the inefficiency of their intelligence service since both the DGIPS and the DFS, as well as police officers and military agents, were involved in the kidnapping. In order to avoid a bigger escalation of the crisis, both the DGIPS and the DFS were officially dissolved in 1985 and its remnants combined into one organization, the General Directorate of Investigation and National Security (Dirección General de Investigación y Seguridad Nacional, DGISN), which was renamed Center of Investigation and National Security (Centro de Investigación y Seguridad Nacional, CISEN) in 1989. By that time, most of what was considered as a “bad element” in the previous agencies had been purged and the main focus of the new organization was rooted in the new political and social environment: rule of law. Most of the previous elements of the DGIPS and DFS, having been trained in counterinsurgency strategies and intelligence gathering, defected and started working with the drug cartels.

== DIPS & DGIPS Directors ==
As part of the consolidation process of the Mexican Revolution, little political power was given to the military. This was done in order to avoid generals or captains having a strong influence on the government structure, which might lead to the destabilization of political system. As so, the directors and top members of the DGIPS were mostly from a civilian background, with the exception of Capt. Alfonso Castro de la Mora. This was in sharp contrast with the DFS, whose directors mostly came from the military sector.

- Alfonso García González (1942)
- José Lelo de Larrea (1943)
- Capt. Alfonso Castro de la Mora (1943)
- Lamberto Ortega Peregrina (1950)
- Alejandro Romero Ortega (1952)
- Raúl Lince Medellín (1958)
- Rafael Hernández Ochoa (1964)
- Manuel Ibarra Herrera (1966)
- Jorge A. Vázquez Robles (1975)
- Óscar de Lassé (1982 - 1985)

== See also ==
- Dirección Federal de Seguridad
- Dirty War (Mexico)
- Liga Comunista 23 de Septiembre
- Party of the Poor (Mexico)
