= Francisco Barrios (musician) =

Mexican musician, songwriter

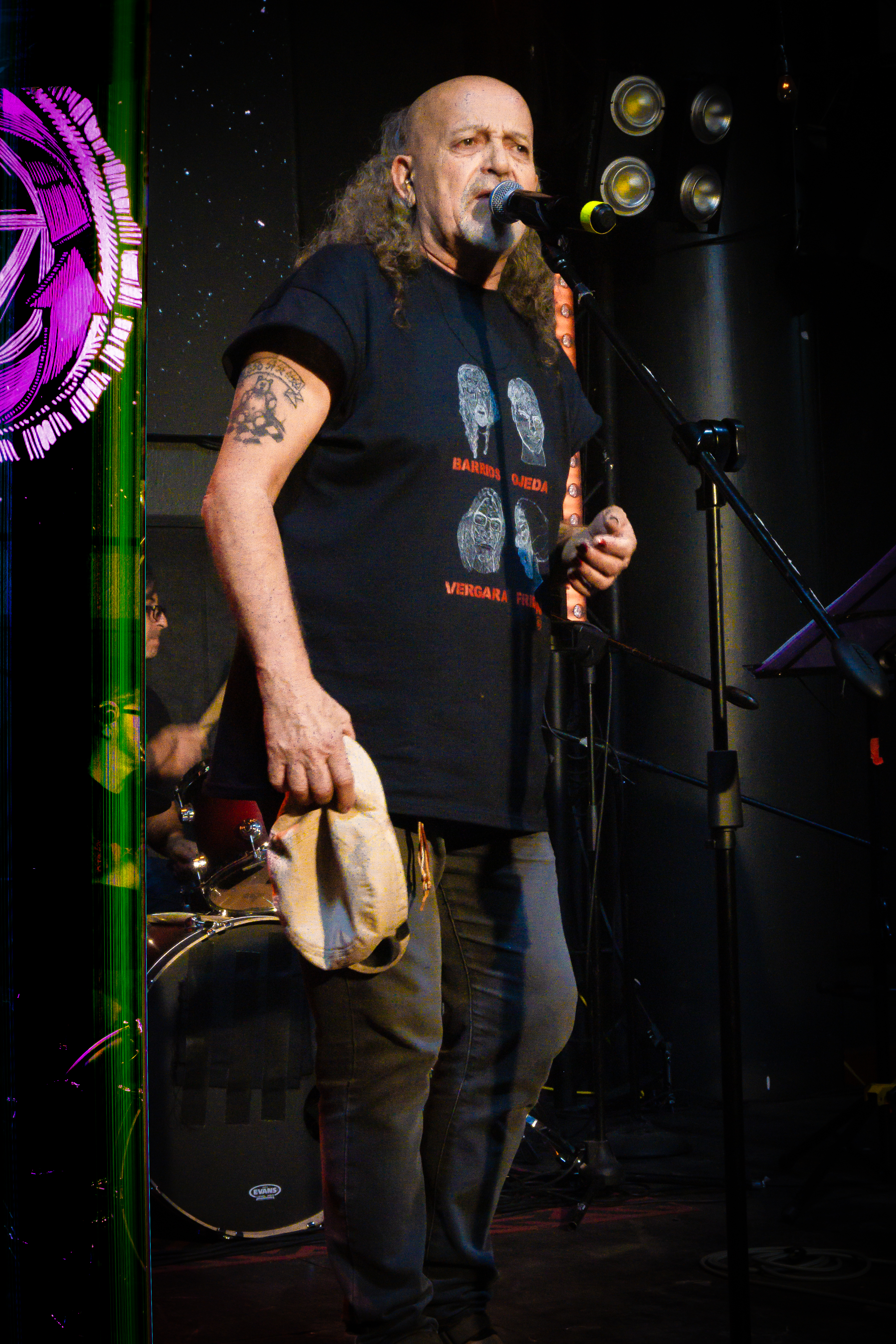
Francisco Barrios.

Francisco Arturo Barrios Martínez also known by the name El Mastuerzo, is a Mexican musician, composer, record producer, actor and drummer of the band Botellita de Jeréz. El Mastuerzo is an active composer of rolas and founder of the artist collective Kloakas Komunikantes.

== Works ==
=== Solo albums ===
- Prohibido (Culebra-BMG, 1996)
- Podrid@ Francisco Barrios El Mastuerzo y Karne de res (Ediciones Pentagrama, 2002)
- Kbezakhabla Zabalburu (Kloakas komunikantes, 2005)
- Tributo a la Otra Kancion Popular Mexikana, Rolópera en Seis Movimientos (Ediciones Pentagrama, 2006)

=== With Botellita de Jeréz ===
- Botellita de Jerez (1984)
- La Venganza del Hijo del Guacarock (1985)
- Naco es Chido (1987)
- Niña de mis Ojos (1989)
- Busca Amor (1990)
- Todo lo que digas será al revés (1992)
- Forjando Patria (1994)
- Superespecial Un Plug (1996)
- El Último Guacarrock (1998)

=== Other works ===
- Los nakos by Los nakos (Ediciones Nvl, 1976).
- La lengua. by Los nakos (Ediciones Nvl, 1980)
- Del surrealismo, la picaresca y el humor by José de Molina, Sergio Magaña y Los nakos (Ediciones nvl, 1981).
- Contraconfesiones by José de Molina. (Ediciones Nvl, 1982).
- Manifiesto by José de Molina. (Ediciones Nvl, 1983).
- Terremotos by José de Molina. (Ediciones Nvl, 1986).
