= El Carmen de Viboral =

- Municipality and town
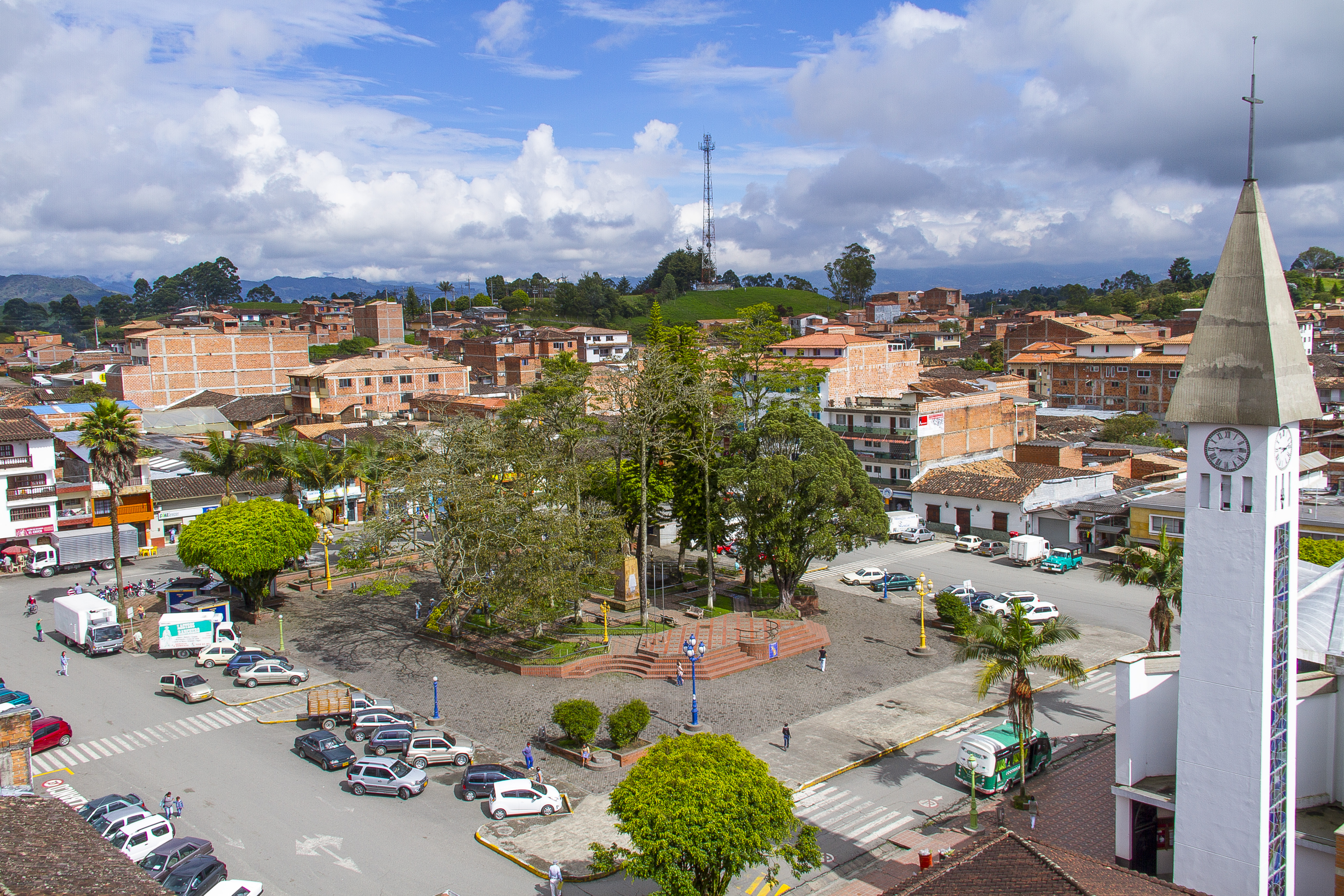
- Town center of El Carmen de Viboral

- Flag Coat of arms
- Motto(s): God, country, and work
- Anthem: Anthem to Carmen de Viboral
- Location of the municipality of Carmen de Viboral in the Antioquia Department

- Location in Colombia
- Coordinates: 6°5′N 75°20′W
- Country: Colombia
- Region: Andean Region
- Department: Antioquia Department
- Subregion: Eastern

Area
  - Municipality and town: 423.6 km^{2} (163.6 sq mi)
  - Urban: 3.07 km^{2} (1.19 sq mi)
- Elevation: 2,150 m (7,050 ft)

Population (2020 est.)
  - Municipality and town: 62,581
  - Density: 147.7/km^{2} (382.6/sq mi)
  - Urban: 37,196
  - Urban density: 12,100/km^{2} (31,400/sq mi)
- Website: www.elcarmendeviboral-antioquia.gov.co

Anthem of El Carmen de Viboral

El Carmen de Viboral is a town and municipality in the Colombian department of Antioquia. In 2020, the population was estimated to be 62,581. It is part of the subregion of Eastern Antioquia and is located 54 km (34 mi) away from Medellín, the capital city of the Antioquia department. El Carmen de Viboral is a small town that specializes in ceramics. Many shops allow visitors to see how ceramics and other handicrafts are made.

Carmen de Viboral is bordered by Cocorná in the northeast, Sonsón in the southeast, Abejorral in the southwest, La Unión and La Ceja to the west, and Rionegro and Marinilla to the northwest.

== History ==
El Carmen de Viboral was founded on April 11, 1714. The area was first inhabited by the Tahamí people. It became a municipality in 1814.

In 1945, the Jorge Eliécer Gaitán National Ceramics School (Escuela Nacional de Cerámica Jorge Eliécer Gaitán) opened in Carmen for training in the making of ceramics. This school would later expand to become the Jorge Eliécer Gaitán Industrial Technical Institute.

The town's anthem was written by Alberto Acosta Tobón and composed by Sixto Arango Gallo in 1961.

A Ceramics Museum in Carmen de Viboral opened in 2012.

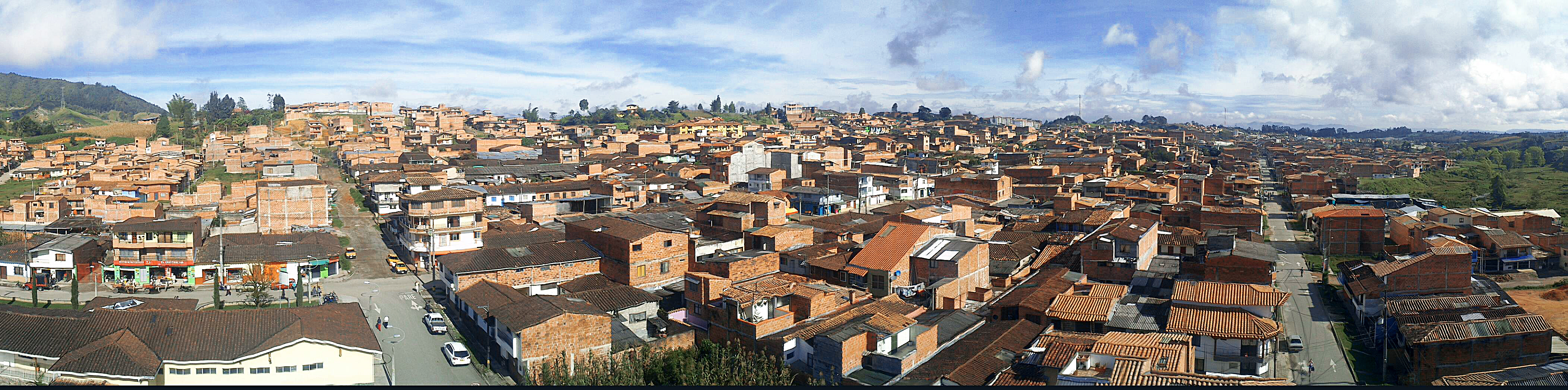
Panorama of El Carmen de Viboral in 2013.

== Ceramics ==
El Carmen de Viboral is well known for its handcraft ceramics, which date back to the late 19th century, specifically 1898, when Eliseo Pareja founded his first ceramics business in the town. On moving to the area, he found a richness of feldspar and quartz, which are fundamental minerals in the fabrication of ceramics.

The ceramics of El Carmen de Viboral combine the indigenous and Spaniard traditions plus the American aspirations. They are unique to the region and the world. No two ceramic pieces are the same, as everything is uniquely hand painted.

Ceramics from El Carmen have been gifted to foreign leaders and politicians, including Elizabeth II and Pope Leo XIV.

== Education ==
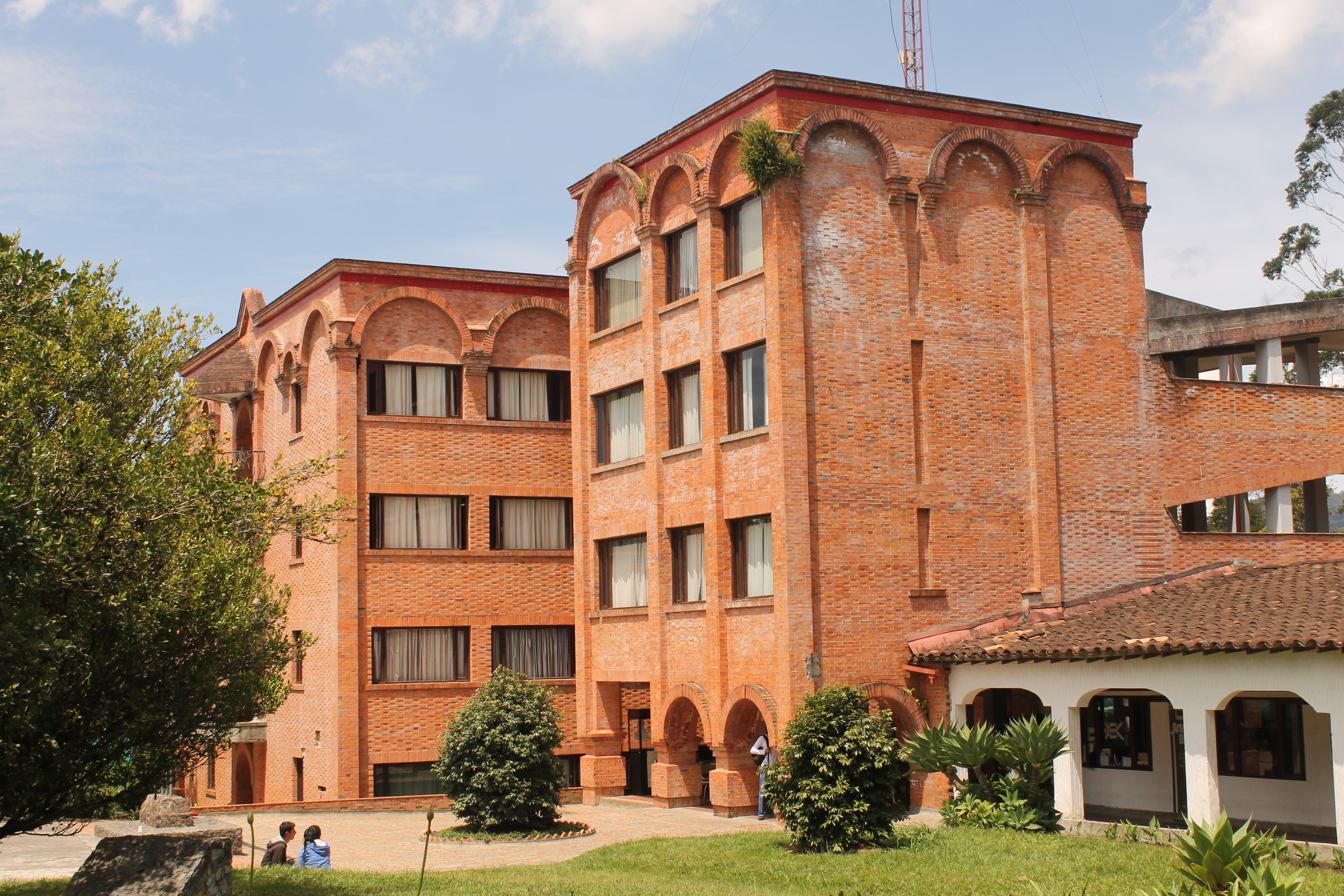
University of Antioquia regional campus in Carmen de Viboral.

A regional campus of the University of Antioquia opened in Carmen in 2003.

== Cuisine ==
Typical cuisine in the town includes arepas de chócolo and cheese, as well as sweets and other Antioquian dishes such as the bandeja paisa.

== Demographics ==
According to DANE statistics from the 2005 Census, the ethnic composition of the municipality is the following:

- Mestizo and White (97.2%)
- Black (2.8%)

== Politics ==
Since 1988, the mayor is chosen by popular vote and serves a term of four years.

== Notable people ==
- Manolo Betancur, Colombian-born American baker and immigrant rights activist
- Leobardo Pérez Jiménez, Colombian painter and sculptor
- Alejandro Osorio, Colombian cyclist
- Frank Osorio, Colombian cyclist
- Walter Vargas, Colombian cyclist

== See also ==
- Media related to El Carmen de Viboral at Wikimedia Commons
