= Leobardo Vázquez Atzin =

- Born: ca. 1975; Mexico
- Died: March 21, 2018; In his home in Gutiérrez Zamora, Veracruz, Mexico
- Cause of death: Murder
- Body discovered: Gutiérrez Zamora, Veracruz, Mexico
- Occupation: Journalist
- Organization(s): Enlace Informativo Regional, La Opinión de Poza Rica, Vanguardia de Veracruz
- Title: Director

Leobardo Vázquez Atzin, (ca. 1975 – March 21, 2018) was a Mexican journalist for newspapers La Opinión, of Poza Rica, and Vanguardia in Gutiérrez Zamora, Veracruz, Mexico. He was also the director of the online news platform, Enlace Gutiérrez Zamora. Vázquez was known for reporting on crime and politics.

== Personal ==
Along his reporting career, he also owned and operated his own food stand, and sold carnitas, tacos, and pork rinds.

== Career ==
Before starting his digital career at Enlace Gutiérrez Zamora, he worked at two of the local papers, La Opinión de Poza Rica and the Vanguardia. Before his digital career, he also edited for the newspaper El Noreste, and was one of the founders of the magazine El Portal. Vázquez was known for reporting on crime and politics in Veracruz, Mexico.

== Death ==
Mentioned locations within Mexico relative to the capital Mexico City.

Vázquez was shot dead inside his home in Gutiérrez Zamora on March 21, 2018. He had reportedly been shot three times. The murderer or murderers were believed to have left the scene by motorcycle. The motive for his murder is believed to be in association to his work as a journalist, as he had reported on illegal invasion of private property in Tecolutla on March 6, 2018. However, other sources state that the reason for his murder is because of his reporting on a notary. Vázquez had asked for help and protection several days before his death. The body was found by his wife.

Jaime Cisneros confirmed on March 22, 2018, that they are investigating his murder and his reporting as a possible motive. Cisneros is the special prosecutor in Veracruz that covers attacks on journalists in the area.

== Context ==
A year ago, the editor at his former workplace, La Opinión de Poza Rica, had been subjected to armed aggression. However, as of March 21, 2018, his case has had no progress. In February 2018, he had begun reporting on crime and corruption in the local area. On March 6, he had reported on invasion on illegal seizure of private property. Vázquez had become aware that he was in danger on March 9. Vázquez had asked the police for protection, and was ignored.

Before his death, Vázquez was allegedly threatened by the local authorities. These threats were received shortly after Vázquez 's reporting on illegal estate invasion in Tecolutla by the Water Commission of the State of Veracruz. While local media outlets reported that he had requested protection, the State Commission for the Care and Protection of Journalists (CEAPP) reported that he had not lodged an official complaint with the organization.

== Impact ==
Mexico is considered to be one of the most dangerous countries in the Western hemisphere for criminal and political corruption reporting. In Veracruz especially, reporters have often had to resort to self-censorship to stay alive. On March 22, 2018, the organization Article 19 reported that Vázquez was the third journalist in Mexico killed that year.

== Reactions ==
Audrey Azoulay, director general of UNESECO, said, "[his murder]...undermines the ability of journalists to perform their important task of fueling informed public debate."
