= El grito (film) =

Mexican documentary film

- Promotional release poster
- Directed by: Leobardo López Aretche
- Cinematography: Leobardo López Arretche; Roberto Sánchez; José Rovirosa; Alfredo Joskowicz; Francisco Bojórquez; Jorge de la Rosa; León Chávez; Francisco Gaytán; Raúl Kamffer; Jaime Ponce; Federico Villegas; Arturo de la Rosa; Carlos Cuenca; Gullermo Díaz Palafox; Fernando Ladrón de Guevara; Juan Mora; Sergio Valdez; Federico Weingartshofer
- Edited by: Ramón Aupart
- Production company: CUEC
- Release date: 1969
- Running time: 102 minutes
- Country: Mexico
- Language: Spanish

El grito (English: The Cry, The Scream, or The Shout) is a 1968 Mexican documentary film directed by Leobardo López Aretche about the Mexican Student Movement of 1968, in which university students rallied public support for political change under the Institutional Revolutionary Party (PRI), which had been in power since 1929. The film also chronicles the Tlatelolco massacre that occurred in Tlatelolco, Mexico City, on 2 October 1968, committed by the Mexican Armed Forces against students of the National Autonomous University of Mexico (UNAM), the National Polytechnic Institute (IPN) and other universities.

López Aretche, who was then a 26-year-old film student at the Centro Universitario de Estudios Cinematográficos (University Centre of Cinematographic Studies, CUEC) in UNAM, led a group of film students to gather footage of the movement as it grew from July 1968 into October, shot using 16 mm film cameras. López Aretche survived the Tlatelolco massacre but was arrested that night and imprisoned for several months. The footage gathered by him and fellow students was compiled into El grito, which was edited in 1969 but reportedly banned by authorities and was not screened publicly until after López Aretche's suicide in 1970. The film was broadcast on TV for the first time in 1998, before the PRI were voted out of power in 2000.

In 2018, El grito was shown at the Cinéma du Réel film festival in Paris, France.

== Production ==
According to Alfredo Joskowicz, one of the student filmmakers who recorded footage for El grito, a total of almost eight hours of footage was gathered, of which under two hours was included in the finished film. Most of the students' footage of the Tlatelolco massacre was confiscated by soldiers that same evening, but American CBS correspondents offered the filmmakers their own footage of the incident that they had filmed and smuggled out of the country.

== Legacy ==
Film critic and historian Jorge Ayala Blanco described El grito as:

...el testimonio filmico más complete y coherente que existe del Movimiento, visto desde adentro y contrario a las calumnias divulgadas por los demas medios masivos.

[...the most complete and coherent filmic testimony that exists of the Movement, seen from inside and in contrast to the calumnies put out by the rest of the mass media.]

== See also ==
- Guerrilla filmmaking
