= Leobardo López Aretche =

- Born: Leobardo López Aretche; 1942; Mexico City, Mexico
- Died: July 24, 1970 (aged 27–28)
- Occupations: Filmmaker, actor, film producer
- Years active: 1965–1970

Leobardo López Aretche (1942 in Mexico City – July 24, 1970) was a Mexican film director.

== Biography ==
He studied acting and directing with Seki Sano between 1959 and 1963. He then attended Centro Universitario de Estudios Cinematográficos (University Centre of Cinematographic Studies, CUEC) in UNAM, where he directed six short films in four years. One of these (S.O.S / Catarsis, 1968) won a prize at a Canadian film festival. During the Mexican Student Movement of 1968, López and Carlos González Morantes were elected as representatives from CUEC-UNAM to the Consejo Nacional de Huelga (National Strike Council; in Spanish, CNH), the coordinating body behind the movement. He directed the documentary El grito, one of the few cinematographic testimonies of the student movement that survived the censorship of the Mexican government. El grito was later selected as one of the 100 greatest Mexican films by Somos magazine.

In 1969, López Aretche shot the film La pasión and the following year, collaborated in the making of Alfredo Joskowicz's feature film Crates (1970). López Aretche committed suicide on 24 July 1970, while filming his debut feature El canto del ruiseñor. Jorge Ayala Blanco lamented his passing, saying that he was "an artist with a special vision". After his death, Alfredo Joskowicz made the film El cambio, based on a narrative by López Arretche.

== Work ==
=== Short films ===
- Lapso (1965)
- Panteón / No 45 (1966)
- El jinete del cubo (1966)
- S.O.S / Catársis (1968)
- El Hijo (1968)
- Leobardo Barrabás / Parto sin temor (1969)

=== Feature films ===
- El grito, Mexico 1968 (1970)

=== As photographer ===
- La pasión

=== As screenwriter ===
- Crates (1970)
