= Luis Carrión Beltrán =

Mexican screenwriter (1942–1997)

- Born: Luis Carrión Beltrán; May 3, 1942; Mexico City, Mexico
- Died: June 1, 1997 (aged 55); Mexico City, Mexico
- Occupations: Writer and journalist
- Writing career
- Genres: Chronicle, Novel
- Notable works: El infierno de todos tan temido (1974), Avandaro (1971)
- Literary movement: Generación del '68 (1968 Generation)
- Website: luiscarrionbeltran.blogspot.ca

Luis Carrión Beltrán (May 3, 1942 Mexico City – June 1, 1997) was a renowned Mexican screenwriter, journalist, novelist and professor at SOGEM. His works dealt with the issues of socialism, the Mexican regime of the PRI and global social injustice in general.

== Biography ==
Son of Flora Beltrán and influential political writer and intellectual Jorge Carrión (1913–2005), Luis was born in Mexico City but was registered three months later in San Andrés Tuxtla, Veracruz where he spent his early years.

He became a licensed pilot in Mexico City and worked as one fumigating crops in northern Mexico. In those trips with his father, he came in contact with influential figures such as Lazaro Cardenas and Carlos Fuentes. He enrolled at the prestigious Patrice Lumumba University in Moscow to study journalism. It was there that he met one of his idols, Ernesto "Che" Guevara.

Back in Mexico in 1970, he was commissioned to collect all of Guevara writings into a compilation which was published by Editorial Diogenes. In 1971 and under the same publisher, he wrote his famous reportage named "Avándaro" (with pictures by renown photographer Graciela Iturbide) which had heavy criticism of the rock festival of the same name from a leftist point of view, since he perceived that the jipitecas and La Onda members were not committed enough to change the country's political system as the leftists were and that they were being deceived by the government. By 1974 he was awarded the prestigious FCE prize for what is considered by some critics to be his literary masterwork "El infierno de todos tan temido" (Hell, feared by all). The novel was heavily censored by the Mexican government of the time since it criticized the administration and corruption of psychiatric institutions.

By the mid-1970s he formed the company Cinematografica Marco Polo, in order to produce films which he thought could influence public opinion on delicate social issues. The studio released the film "El infierno de todos tan temido" of the novel of the same name directed by Sergio Olhovich, including actors Manuel Ojeda and Diana Bracho. It is still considered a masterpiece of the 1970s Mexican cinema.

== Awarded films ==
1973 1st prize in Fermo, Italy for "El cambio" (The change). Dir. Alfredo Joskowicz.

1975 Golden Ariel with "La otra virginidad" (The other virginity) Dir. Juan Manuel Torres.

1977 Silver Bear in Berlin, for "Los albañiles" (The Bricklayers) (1976) Dir. Vicente Leñero.

1981 Ariel winner for Best Documentary, Golden Lotus in Vietnam and Coral de Plata (2nd place) in Cuba for "Así es Vietnam" (So is Vietnam) Dir. Jorge Fons.

== Death ==
After years of suffering depression due to lack of serotonin and dealing with a separation from his wife, on Sunday June 1, 1997, Carrion telephoned his family members, colleagues and long-time friends José Agustín and Jorge Fons (leaving a message in his answering machine) while he watched a soccer match on TV, mixing pills with alcohol before committing suicide by cutting his feet arteries causing a massive and fatal hemorrhage.
