= Enrique Marroquin =

Mexican Catholic priest and scholar (born 1939)

Father Enrique Marroquín

Orders
- Ordination: 1964 (Catholic Church)

Personal details
- Born: Enrique Fernando Marroquín Zaleta; 30 January 1939 Mexico City, Mexico
- Occupation: Priest, theologian, philosopher

Enrique Marroquín (born January 30, 1939 Mexico City, Mexico) is a Mexican liberal Catholic priest, writer and scholar, considered to be one of the key figures of the Mexican counterculture movement of La Onda (The Wave) and a strong supporter of the Liberation theology movement.

== Early years and Divinity studies ==
Marroquin was born as Enrique Fernando Marroquín Zaleta in Mexico City to a highly educated and cultured family. His aunt, a concert pianist, introduced him to personalities such as Gabilondo Soler and Manuel Ponce.

In 1955 Marroquin enrolled at Toluca's Seminary in the Claretian congregation and in 1964 he was ordained priest in Salamanca, Spain followed by a graduate degree in scholasticism at Rome's Angelicum. He got involved with the counterculture by attending the world premiere of the "Beat Mass", encouraged by Pope Paul VI, by the Italian band "I Barritas" and by organizing contests and debates about rock music, The Beatles, Bob Dylan, the poètes maudits, the Beatniks, etc. His thesis was a comparative between the transcendentals and the works of Heidegger.

== Counterculture years and Avandaro ==
By 1967 Marroquin was appointed Professor of Philosophy and to implement a self-designed experimental course called "Man of Today" which included the study of music from blues and The Beatles to Ravi Shankar and Karlheinz Stockhausen at the Seminary of Zinacantepec, Mexico. He soon made contact with Mexico's leading avant-garde personalities such as Juan José Gurrola, José Luis Cuevas, Carlos Monsiváis (who at the time had a jazz radio show) and Alejandro Jodorowsky (Marroquín often attended to his famous avant-garde happenings). At the time of the Tlatelolco massacre, he defended the point of view of the students and praised the response of José Revueltas.

Marroquín named the Mexican hippies as jipitecas (or xipitecas) in order to differentiate them from American hippies. In his view, the jipitecas had a lot of influence from pre-Columbian Indians. In his Parish, he had a rock band performing during Mass service and during his sermons divinity and counterculture issues were often mixed.

Marroquin was also hired as Associated Editor of the Mexican edition of the Rolling Stone magazine, named Piedra Rodante, writing about music, politics and social issues. He came in contact with some other leading personalities of La Onda such as José Agustín, Parménides Garcia, Juan Tovar, Mayita Campos and Carlos Baca. As part of the magazine he attended the Avandaro Festival and on the eve of the Avandarazo, Marroquín wrote, in defense of the festival, a memorable article in Piedra Rodante named "Dios quiere que llueva para unirnos" (God wants the rain so we can unite). With the hippie movement waning and as final testimony of those intense years of working inside La Onda, Marroquín wrote the book, La contracultura como protesta (The counterculture as protest) considered one of the few serious works for the study of this particular movement written by a La Onda intellectual.

== Liberation theology ==
From 1973 onwards, Marroquín dedicated most of his time to expand his ties with the Liberation theology movement, further angering traditional clergymen by participating with other like-minded priests and even Marxist collaborators. In the early 1980s he enrolled in the prestigious Puebla University graduating in anthropology.

From 1983 to 1994 Marroquin moved to the problematic state of Oaxaca, supporting indigenous peoples' rights and studying their societies, publishing authoritative essays with the Universidad Autónoma Benito Juárez de Oaxaca press from subjects of anthropology of religion to Church-State relationships. He graduated with a Ph.D. at the Universidad Autónoma Metropolitana with the thesis "The religious conflict in Oaxaca 1976-1993". Released as a book, it received positive reviews.

Marroquin was a strong supporter of bishop Samuel Ruiz during the EZLN uprising.

== Recent activities ==
Marroquin currently works in the Parish of San Antonio Claret in Mexico City, where he wrote his memoirs named "Historia y profecia" (History and Prophecy).

== Literary works ==
- "Piedra Rodante", Nos.1-8. Editores Tribales, S.A. Mexico, 1971–1972.
- "La Contracultura como Protesta", Ed. Joaquín Mortiz, Mexico, 1975.
- "Lenguaje, Ideología y Clases Sociales: Las Vecindades de Puebla", UAP, Puebla, 1983.
- "La Cruz Mesiánica: Aproximación al Sincretismo de Oaxaca", Ed. Palabra / IISUABJO, Mexico, 1986. Second ed., 1999.
- "La Iglesia y el Poder": Ed. Dabar, Mexico, 1992.
- "¿Persecución Religiosa en Oaxaca?", Instituto Oaxaqueño de las Culturas, Mexico, 1994.
- "Dios en el Amanecer del Milenio", Ed. Dabar, Mexico, 1999.
- "En Servicio de la Palabra", Ed. Dabar, Mexico, 2003.
- "Otro mundo es posible: justicia, paz e integridad de la Creación y vida consagrada", Ediciones Claretianas, Spain, 2006.
- "El Conflicto Religioso: Oaxaca 1976-1992" UNAM/CEIICH /IISUABJO, Mexico, 2007.
- "Entre pasillos y escaparates: el Mall, signo de nuestro tiempo", IMDOSOC / BUAP /Misioneros Claretianos, Mexico, 2010.
- "Historia y Profecia" Bubok Publishing S.L., Spain, 2014.
