= Festival Rock y Ruedas de Avándaro =

1971 historic Mexican rock festival

Avandaro
- Photograph of the Avandaro Festival poster
- Genre: Rock and folk, including jazz-rock, blues-rock, folk rock, latin rock, experimental rock and psychedelic rock styles.
- Dates: September 11–12, 1971
- Locations: Tenantongo, Valle de Bravo, State of Mexico, Mexico.
- Years active: Original festival held in 1971
- Founders: PROMOTORA GO, S.A. (Eduardo Lopez Negrete, President)/TELESISTEMA MEXICANO (Luis de Llano Macedo, Producer).

The Festival Rock y Ruedas de Avándaro (also known as the Festival de Avándaro or simply Avándaro) was a historic Mexican rock festival held on September 11–12, 1971, on the shores of Lake Avándaro near the Avándaro Golf Club, in a hamlet called Tenantongo, near the town of Valle de Bravo in the central State of Mexico. The festival, organized by brothers Eduardo and Alfonso Lopez Negrete's company Promotora Go, McCann Erickson executive and sports promoter Justino Compean and Telesistema Mexicano producer Luis de Llano Macedo, took place at the height of La Onda and celebrated life, youth, ecology, music, peace and free love, has been compared to the American Woodstock festival for its psychedelic music, counterculture imagery and artwork, and open drug use. A milestone in the history of Mexican rock music, the festival has drawn anywhere from an estimated 100,000 to 500,000 concertgoers.

The festival originally scheduled 12 bands booked by music impresarios Waldo Tena and Armando Molina Solis' agency, but a total of 18 acts performed outdoors during the first, sometimes rainy weekend, before a massive crowd. The event was captured in film by, among others, Cinematográfica Marco Polo, Telesistema Mexicano, Cablevision and Peliculas Candiani. Audio was captured by Polydor Records and a live radio broadcast was sponsored by The Coca-Cola Company. Images of the festival were captured by professional photographers like Nadine Markova, Graciela Iturbide, Pedro Meyer and others.

The Super 8 short films Avándaro produced by Gutiérrez y Prieto of Cablevision and directed by Alfredo Gurrola and Tinta Blanca en Avándaro produced by Raul Candiani of Peliculas Candiani and directed by Humberto Rubalcaba were the only films exclusively about the first festival. They were exhibited at international film festivals and theaters in 1972. Other movies, which partially used footage of the festival, were the Cinematográfica Marco Polo film "La verdadera vocación de Magdalena" produced by Anuar Badin and directed by Jaime Humberto Hermosillo and the Super 8 films "The year of the rat" by Enrique Escalona and "La segunda primera matriz" by Alfredo Gurrola.

An accompanying soundtrack with a selection of the live recordings produced by Luis de Llano's company LUDELL/BAKITA Records and named Avandaro, por fin... 32 años después (Avandaro, at last ... 32 years later), was finally released in 2003.

== Before Avandaro: Massive events, student repression and La Onda ==
By 1971 Mexico, ruled by the PRI, had organized two of the most important sporting events in the world: the 1970 FIFA World Cup and the 1968 Summer Olympics, gaining a fresh and modern image its government wanted to show to the outside world. At the same time, its government had violently repressed political youth movements known as the Tlatelolco massacre and the Halconazo, which in turn gave way to the so-called Mexican Dirty War of the early 1970s.

The Mexican hippies, called "jipitecas" by Catholic priest and scholar Enrique Marroquin, created a multidisciplinary movement called La Onda (The wave). In accordance to their hippie values, La Onda did not advocate a violent overthrow of the PRI, but it did advocate change. By 1969 the government had already banned the musical Hair after a unique performance of it in Acapulco, censuring the rock band Los Shakes (which included stars Pixie Hopkin, Mayita Campos and Nono Zaldivar), investigating impresario Alfredo Elias Calles (grandson of late president Plutarco Elias Calles) and deporting foreign actors and producers like Michael Butler, Gerome Ragni and James Rado. Such actions were heavily covered by local and American media like The New York Times and Time. Writer Carlos Monsivais, who witnessed the event, wrote an extensive article about the incident in his book Dias de guardar. Also in 1969, the band Pop Music Team had suffered censorship due to their hit "Tlatelolco" (which only had two weeks of radio airplay) and in February 1971 in Monterrey, a collective band called Sierra Madre, led by Teja Cunningham, and a state-of-the-art lights spectacle named "Music and light show" had faced repression after a failed attempt to hold a three-day concert, called Concierto Blanco (white concert) inside the State government palace in Monterrey's main square. The violent incidents after the White concert, which were extensively covered by the media, seriously damaged then Nuevo Leon governor Eduardo Elizondo's political career.

News from Cuba (Varadero '70), Colombia (Festival de Ancon), Argentina (Festival Buenos Aires Rock), Chile (Festival de los Dominicos "Piedra Roja"), England (Isle of Wight) and films from American festivals like "Monterey Pop" and "Woodstock" fueled the desire for the jipitecas to host their own major counterculture event. The opportunity arrived in the spring of 1971.

== History ==
Trying to resurrect their popular auto racing spot, Circuito Avándaro, after being cancelled in 1969 as a result of the fatal accident of racing driver Moisés Solana, Promotora Go owners brothers Eduardo and Alfonso López Negrete in partnership with McCann vice-president Justino Compeán decided to organize a massive auto race with live rock music acts and consulted then Telesistema Mexicano promoter Luis de Llano Macedo to video-record the motoring event and to hire Javier Bátiz and La Revolución de Emiliano Zapata, two of the most popular Mexican rock acts of the time. Luis de Llano was at the time producing a section named La onda de Woodstock in the Jacobo Zabludovsky's program Hoy Domingo (Today Sunday). De Llano assembled a team of around 330 individuals to organize the music part of the festival, among them reporter/musicologist Jaime Almeida, screenwriter Armando Molina, publicist Carlos Alazraki, and MCs Roberto Naranjo and Eduardo Davis. Molina, himself an impresario and musician from La Maquina del Sonido fame, was appointed Music Coordinator. The music coordination was in the hands of the company ArTe, owned by Molina and Waldo Tena (of Los rebeldes del Rock fame). After many negotiations and declining invitations Molina proceeded to book 12 bands. Designer Joe Vera was hired to design the official poster and tickets were sold at AUTOMEX-Chrysler agencies across the country for MX$25. Jacobo Zabludovsky heavily supported and promoted the festival in his daily news program "24hrs" and he was one of the few mainstream broadcasters to defend it in its aftermath.

== The venue ==
=== Expectations ===
According to Justino Compean, five hours were bought to live-broadcast the auto-race to be intercalated with the rock concert videotaped the previous night. As was reported in the Corpus Christi Caller-Times, a maximum of 25,000 attendees, 122 pilots with their staff (with their number expected to reduce after the technical inspections) and 12 Mexican bands with a possible last-minute inclusion of American bands to bolster the event was expected. The bands were going to play from Saturday 7 pm to Sunday 7 am, making way for the auto race to start in public roads around the lake. 2 weeks before the event, the 5 hotels in town were already booked. In the TV Azteca documentary "Historias Engarzadas: Alex Lora" Alex Lora explained that this possible "inclusion of American bands" was going to be a surprise visit by Santana.

=== Live Radio Broadcasting ===
Sports promoter Justino Compean and Radio Juventud General Manager Ramiro Garza made a deal with then Coca-Cola Company Marketing Director, Vicente Fox Quezada, to sponsor the live radio broadcasting of the music and the live-TV broadcast of the auto racing event.

=== Lighting and sound systems ===
Héctor Yaber from Telesistema Mexicano was in charge of the lighting system and Gustavo Cota from the company Audiorama S.A. of the PA system. All equipments were transported by the company Mudanzas Galván of José C. Galván Castro.

=== Security ===
The security was going to be in charge of the State of Mexico's Judicial Police chief Cuauhtémoc Cardenas (not the politician of the same name), who was going to receive support from 200 state troopers, 120 army troops and 50 Special Agents from the Secretariat of the Interior as well as Valle de Bravo's Fire Department. Nevertheless, reports of the total amount of security agents were mixed. Variety reported a total of 700 law-enforcement agents.

=== Terms between the organizers and mayor Montes de Oca ===
The festival president Eduardo Lopez Negrete and Valle de Bravo's then-mayor Juan Montes de Oca Loza agreed that no liquor was going to be sold. Beer would be sold only with a meal. In an in-depth radio/video interview with radio host Rafael Catana, Armando Molina stated that mayor Montes de Oca suggested to Valle de Bravo's inhabitants to be polite with the hippie crowd as they felt being overwhelmed by the excessive numbers of them. In the end, not a single Valle de Bravo inhabitant complained about the hippies.

== Cancellation of the auto race ==
Early Saturday morning it was decided, as stated by Alfonso Lopez Negrete, in an on-site interview made by a Telesistema Mexicano, to cancel the auto race due to the quantity of festival attendees which surpassed all expectations.

The Circuito Avandaro auto-race was going to be suspended for decades to come since authorities tied the sport with massive crowds.

== The music ==
=== Pre-festival ===
As stated by Armando Nava, Alex Lora and De Llano in the Memorias de un cierto dia: Avandaro documentary, tens of thousands of jipitecas were already on-site since Thursday 9, so activities begun (Thursday) with special shows and even some impromptu concerts bands like El Amor, Dug Dug's and Three Souls in my Mind offered while doing their sound-check. By Saturday 11 at 6AM, the number of attendees were already in the hundreds of thousands, so Molina and De Llano decided to formally start the festival with a "Pre-festival". The acts which performed were:

- Carlos Baca (Yoga session and ecology lecture)
- Eduardo Ruiz Saviñón and UNAM's experimental theater troupe with Carlos Steward. (Performed The Who's "Tommy" rock opera)
- La Ley de Herodes (band of the famous Arau family.)
- Zafiro
- La Sociedad Anonima
- Los Soul Masters
- La Fachada de Piedra with Larry Sanchez (39.4)

=== Festival ===
La Fachada de Piedra concluded their act at approx. 5pm. After a brief pause the festival resumed as follows:

- Los Dug Dug's
- El Epilogo
- La División del Norte
- Tequila
- Peace & Love
- El Ritual
- Bandido
- Los Yaki with Mayita Campos
- Tinta Blanca
- El Amor
- Three Souls in my Mind

At around Sunday 9am, Three Souls in my Mind finished their act and the massive exodus started.

== Festival development ==
As stated by Armando Molina in the official soundtrack (narration part) and by his then assistant Jaime Almeida, the whole festival was held in peace with the only problem being that the attendees destroyed the barricade and invaded reserved areas of the light towers and even the stage. In the official soundtrack desperate calls for order from Molina's assistant Roberto Naranjo and band members from Dug Dug's, El Epilogo, and Peace and Love can be heard. At one point, an attendee fainted and Tequila's world-class Mexican-American singer, Maricela Durazo, ordered the crowd to take good care and protect her. As many thousands of jipitecas were on-site since Friday 10, co-organizer Luis de Llano stated the famous phrase: "They survived for three days sharing rain and mud; that was in attempt to have an identity."

Francisco Martinez Gallardo, chief of the medical team and voluntaries of the improvised in-site hospital stated: "There was one case of acute appendicitis, 20 intoxicated with pills, 50 with marijuana, 5 with alcoholic congestion, 5 cases of gastroenteritis and some with wounded heads, ankle fractures and burns."

Photographer Nadine Markova's truck caught fire in the wee hours, with no casualties. Images of Valle de Bravo firefighters attending the debris were captured by Sergio Garcia and can be seen in the film Avandaro: Imagenes Ineditas. Luis de Llano also recalled the incident in his book and on the festival's 50th anniversary on the internet-TV program Platicando con Alazraki.

== Exodus ==
State governor Carlos Hank agreed to send 300 buses to pick up some of the attendees. The news were cheered with a rarely seen approval for a Mexican president from his country's youth. Although wrongly crediting president Echeverria for sending the bues, Luis de Llano announced the news to the crowd: "Lets cheer up Luis Echeverria, who is gonna send 300 buses of 50 seats each so we can go back...is a good guy that fella" (un aplauso para Luis Echeverría que nos va a mandar 300 camiones de 50 pasajeros para el regreso ... a todo dar el chavo ese). As can be seen in the Gurrola film, thousands upon thousands of hippies were walking from the site and many of them were overwhelming the buses.

== Aftermath: Avandarazo and controversies ==
As can be heard in the soundtrack, the band Peace and Love performed the songs "Marihuana" and "We got the power", that were considered controversial to Mexican society. At the same time, Peace and Love front-man Ricardo Ochoa used some foul language in order to cheer up the crowd, echoing what Country Joe McDonald did at Woodstock. Since the festival was being broadcast live through Radio Juventud and relay stations all over the country, some segments of society took this as a direct threat to the establishment ("Marihuana" for advocating open drug-use and "We got the power" for wrongly associating it with a possible popular uprising). The possible association of jipitecas with subversive and radical political movements is what caused the so-called Avandarazo.

In the aftermath of the post-festival turmoil, several interviewed concertgoers stated that the whole festival was held in peace and without major incidents; however, Moya Palencia, then Secretary of the Interior, accused the organizers of acting with intent and governor Hank González stated that the festival organizers "... were given permission to perform a sporting event, but instead they presented a rock festival" but, as stated by Armando Fuentes Aguirre Caton, his political opponents took this as an opportunity to destroy his presidential aspirations.

Opinions from the world of politics, religion and academia were deeply divided. While influential university professors and La Onda writers such as Parménides García and José Agustín mostly gave the festival a fairly positive review, and some intellectuals like Paco Ignacio Taibo I, Elena Poniatowska, Octavio Paz and José Emilio Pacheco gave a fair evaluation. Others such as Roberto Blanco Moheno and Eduardo "Rius" del Rio criticized it negatively, while Carlos Monsiváis gave the festival a negative review but changed his mind afterwards. As Guadalajara Cardinal José Garibi y Rivera condemned it, popular liberal priest and festival attendee Enrique Marroquin praised it, publishing in Piedra Rodante a controversial article in its defense called "God wants the rain so we can unite." There was also a notable incident at La Profesa, when during mass in homage to Mexico's Independence figure Agustin de Iturbide, a group of about 250 individuals belonging to a conservative civil movement left the building in protest as mass was being served by Monsignor Rafael Vazquez Corona, a strong supporter of the festival. Monsignor Vazquez Corona was then heavily criticized by then rector of the University of Guadalajara, Dr. Garibay Gutiérrez, in his 1972 book about the festival "El gran desafio: Volver a pensar".

Union leader Fidel Velazquez simply called the festival "a Bacchanalia", Attorney General Ojeda Paullada labelled it as a "witches' Sabbath" and President of the Senate, Enrique Olivares Santana, yelled in a press conference: "Let there be no more Avandaros in the Republic!". Finally and under pressure, president Luis Echeverría made a strong statement against the festival, saying: "While we regret and condemn the phenomenon of Avándaro, it also encourages us in our belief that only a small part of our youth are in favor of such acts and entertainment."

President Echeverria then proceeded to crack down La Onda. Some early 1970s hit-songs like "Avandaro" from Rosario, "Seguir al sol" by Pajaro Alberto and other songs which commemorated the event, were banned from radio air play, Radio Juventud DJs Félix Ruano Mendez, Jaime Marin and Agustín Meza de la Peña were temporarily suspended but, contrary to popular belief, they were not terminated. On the other hand, the influential Piedra Rodante magazine was indeed terminated in early 1972 and festival co-organizer Justino Compean left the country for a while.

The band Tinta Blanca and other rock musicians tried, unsuccessfully, to hold a meeting with president Echeverria with a famous protest outside Los Pinos. After a short time the protest was peacefully dissolved.

== Films and TV ==
=== Short films ===
- Avandaro. A 1971 Super 8 short film of approximately 20 minutes of footage with live soundtrack, produced by Luis Gutiérrez y Prieto and directed/edited by Alfredo Gurrola. Photographers were awarded-filmmakers Héctor Abadie, David Celestinos and Sergio Garcia Michel. Facing government pressure in the aftermath of the festival, the film was briefly screened in selected theaters, cultural centers and international Super 8 film festivals only. By the end of the 1970s, the film was acquired by Cablevision thanks to the efforts of Gutiérrez y Prieto. As stated in Garcia Michel essay Toward a fourth cinema: "Apart from the technical achievements, Luis always sympathized with this Movement, sponsoring films such as Avándaro, Pasiones [Passions] and La lucha [The Struggle]; the first two were transferred from super-8 to videotape and belong to Cablevisión." In 2006, the company Video Grupo Empresarial included it as a DVD-extra in the release of the 1983 Sergio Garcia film Three Souls in my mind: Una larga experiencia.
- Tinta Blanca en Avándaro. 16mm short film produced by Raul Candiani and directed by the band's manager, Humberto Rubalcaba Zuleta, about the band's participation in the festival. The film was exhibited at the Berlinale and awarded third prize ("Sombrero de Bronce") at the IVth Guadalajara's International Short Film Festival. Mexico, 1972.
- Avándaro: Imágenes Inéditas. Rarely seen footage shot on-site by Sergio Garcia in 1971 and transferred from Super 8 to digital in 2008 by American filmmaker Angela Reginato. This posthumous work was premiered on February 2, 2014, in Mexico City at the Benemérito de las Américas cultural center. Mexico 2008.

=== Documentaries ===
- Avándaro 20 años después. Documentary produced by Enrique Quintero Marmol, Mexico 1991.
- Avándaro. Documentary produced by Tres Tristes Tigres/Enrique Quintero Marmol. A longer version of the 1991 documentary. Mexico 1996.
- Las glorias de Avandaro. An independently produced documentary by Arturo Lara Lozano, Carlos Cruz, Manuel Martinez, Angel Velazquez and Arnulfo Martinez y Torres, Mexico 2005.
- Bajo el sol y frente a Dios. Independent documentary by Arturo Lara Lozano/Enciclopedia del rock mexicano. Mexico, 2016.

=== TV specials ===
- Jueves Espectaculares : Avándaro. Special program of this Telesistema Mexicano's variety show. Presenter Julio Alemán interviewed some of the Festival's organizers as well as the mayor of Valle de Bravo, Mr. Juan Montes de Oca Loza. Mexico, 1971.
- Pantalla de Cristal: Enrique Quintero Marmol. Special program produced by Canal 22-CONACULTA. Presenter Jose Fernandez interviews Quintero Marmol about the festival and his 1991-1996 documentaries. Mexico, 2002.
- In Memoriam: Avándaro. Special program produced by Canal Once/Enrique Quintero Marmol, Mexico 2003.
- Memoria viva de ciertos dias: Festival de Avándaro. Special program produced by Canal 22 (CONACULTA). Includes interviews with Alex Lora, Luis de Llano, Armando Nava and others. Mexico 2003.
- La historia detras del mito: Avándaro. Special program produced and aired by TV Azteca, Mexico 2012.
- El observador: 40 años de Avándaro, Partes 1 y 2. Special program produced by Television Metropolitana S.A. de C.V.- Canal 22. Consejo Nacional para la Cultura y las Artes, Mexico 2013.
- Susana Adicción: Hablando del Festival de Avándaro. Special program dedicated to the festival conducted by Monclova-born singer Susana Zabaleta. Produced by Luis de Llano for UNICABLE-TELEVISA. Mexico 2013.
- Observatorio Cotidiano: 45 años de Avándaro. Special program to commemorate the 45th anniversary of the festival. Includes a short documentary about festival photographer Graciela Iturbide. Produced by TV UNAM. Mexico, 2016.
- Leyendas: Avándaro. Special program hosted by Luis de LLano where he interviews Justino Compean, Graciela Iturbide, Alex Lora and other people involved with the festival. Produced by Televisa. Mexico, 2017.
- Maravillas y Curiosidades de la Filmoteca de la UNAM: Avandaro. Special program hosted by Rafael Avina where he conducts an in-depth interview with filmmaker Alfredo Gurrola about his legendary Super 8mm shortfilm 'Avandaro'. Produced by TV UNAM. Mexico, 2017.
- Platicando con Alazraki: Especial 50o Aniversario del Festival de Avandaro. Special program hosted by Carlos Alazraki where he conducts a round-table dialogue between organizers Luis de Llano, Justino Compean and other festival attendees. Produced by Atypical Te Ve. Mexico, 2021.

=== The festival in documentaries about Mexican rock ===
- Nunca digas que no: Tres decadas de rock mexicano. Documentary produced by MTV, USA 1996.
- Yo no era rebelde, Rock mexicano 1957-1971. Documentary from ClioTV, produced by Enrique Krauze. Mexico 1999.
- BACK. Documentary about the history of rock music in Guadalajara and the involvement of some of its bands in the Avandaro Festival. Produced by the Universidad Autonoma de Guadalajara, Mexico 2006.
- Rock n Roll made in Mexico: From evolution to revolution. Documentary directed by Lance Miccio and produced by Canned Heat drummer Fito de la Parra. USA, 2007.
- Documental 1968-1971: Los Jefes del Rock. Documentary directed by Guillermo Piñón. Set as a fictional story, several persons involved with the festival are interviewed. Produced by Canal 22/CONACULTA. Mexico, 2008.
- Gimme the Power. Documentary by Olallo Rubio about the band Molotov and how Mexican rock music has always had, since the late 1950s and passing through the Avandaro Festival until modern times, an ambiguous relationship with the Mexican government and society. Contains interviews with people involved in the festival like Luis de Llano, Sergio Arau, Alex Lora and Armando Molina. IMCINE-CONACULTA Mexico, 2012.
- Break It All: The History of Rock in Latin America

=== Documentaries in production ===
- Avandaro. In 2012, Mexican filmmaker Javier "Panda" Padilla of the movie Suave patria stated that he was making a documentary about Avandaro but with no due date on sight. In late 2013 he stated that the project, made in cooperation with Enrique Krauze's Editorial CLIO, is stalled due to copyright issues and that it might take years to come into fruition.

=== The festival in movies and TV shows ===
- La verdadera vocación de Magdalena. Contains a segment with a fictional appearance of La Revolucion de Emiliano Zapata and Angelica Maria at the festival. It uses some real footage of the festival interspersed with a fictional recreation of it. Directed by Jaime Humberto Hermosillo. Mexico, 1971.
- Los Polivoces. A comedy TV show of the early 1970s. The frequently seen fictional character Armandaro Valle de Bravo, was supposed to be a jipiteca and was named after the event and Armando Molina. In his debut episode, he is supposed to be interviewed as he and his parents were returning from the festival. Mexico, 1971–1973.
- Güeros. Ariel awarded road movie directed by Alonso Ruizpalacios. It tells the fictional story of four characters who, in the middle of the 1999 UNAM strike, decide to find the legendary Epigmenio Cruz, an artist who once "made Bob Dylan cry" and was scheduled to perform at the festival. México, 2014.
- Avándaro: la leyenda del Mexican Woodstock. Historical film about the trials and tribulations of Lopez Negrete and Justino Compean to organize the festival. Directed by Jose Manuel Cravioto and produced by Mariana Franco of PIREXIA Films. Mexico, 2023.

=== The Telenovelas (soap operas) ===
- Así en el Barrio como en el Cielo (English: So in the neighborhood as in heaven). A TV Azteca soap opera, produced by Fides Velasco and written by Guillermo Ríos and Leticia López Margalli. The plot uses the Avándaro festival as its starting point and main base. Mexico, 2015.

In May 2009 and then in May 2014, Luis de Llano, of Televisa, formally announced that he was preparing a soap opera with the Avándaro festival as its background.

== The Play ==
- Avandaro: A comedy written by Carlos Alfonso Nava and directed by Cristian Magaloni. Three women from very different walks of life check in at a hotel close to the festival. As they are getting ready to show up to the concert, things will not go as planned. The play received laudatory reviews by critics and the blessing of Alex Lora. Mexico, 2018.

== Literature exclusively about Avandaro ==
=== Books ===
- Avándaro: Aliviane o movida? Book written by Vicente Anaya, Eligio Calderon, Carla Zenzes and José Luis Fernandez. Published by Editorial Extemporaneous, Mexico, 1971.
- Avándaro. Book written by Luis Carrión Beltrán with pictures by Graciela Iturbide, published by Editorial Diogenes. Mexico, 1971.
- Avándaro ¡Yeah, Yeah, Yeah!. A collection of essays from different authors collected by Antonio Elizondo. Published by Editorial Paralelo 32, S.A. Mexico, 1971.
- La Trampa (The Trap). A three-part essay about the Mexican youth. Its third chapter, entitled El gran desafío : volver a pensar (The great challenge : to think again), deals with the festival. Written by Luis Garibay Gutiérrez, published by the Autonomous University of Guadalajara. Mexico, 1972.
- Nosotros. Comprehensive photo-book about the festival, written by Tinta Blanca's manager Humberto Rubalcaba, with collaborations from Karen Lee de Rubalcaba, Alfredo Gonzalez and Mario Ongay. Pictures by Jorge Bano, José Pedro Camus, Francisco Drohojowski and Joel Turok. Contains an often cited Prologue by world-renowned journalist Jacobo Zabludovsky. Editorial NOSOTROS. Mexico, 1972.
- Avandaro: Una leyenda (Avandaro: A legend). Book written by Juan Jiménez Izquierdo, a Festival attendee. Eridu Producciones. Mexico, 2011.
- Informe Avándaro 1971. Published in 2014 but originally written in 1971 by intellectual Francisco Javier Estrada and politician Héctor Marín, then recently graduated from Normal school. According to their testimony, they were both appointed by the then General Direction of Public Education (the actual SEP) to make a report about the events of the festival. Published by Casa del Poeta Laura Méndez de Cuenca, Mexico 2014.
- Yo estuve en Avándaro. Written by Federico Rublí K. With photographs by Graciela Iturbide and a prologue by Luis de Llano. Trilce Ediciones. Mexico, 2016.
- Avándaro : la historia jamás contada. Graphic Novel written by Luis Fernando Enríquez Rocha. Editorial Resistencia, Secretaría de Cultura de la CDMX. Mexico, 2018.
- Avandaro: Lo que se dijo y lo que no se habia dicho. An unpublished book by Armando Molina Solis.
- AVANDARO: Cuando el rock mexicano perdió la inocencia. The long-awaited book by Luis de Llano Macedo. Ediciones del Lirio. Mexico, 2021.

=== Comics ===
- Aliviane a la Madre Tierra. A series of comics produced by Carlos Baca about the adventures of "Avandarito" (Little Avandaro) and his friends. Published by Revista Pop, Mexico 1971–1973.

=== Magazines ===
Among many others, the most notorious ones were:

- SIEMPRE!: "Avandaro". Reputable political magazine. While it did not approve some of the excesses committed by the jipitecas, it defended the position taken by then governor Hank and severely criticized the exaggerations of the media about the event. Mexico, 1971.
- Casos de Alarma: Avandaro, el infierno. Exploitation magazine. Fictional story, purported to be real, about a troubled couple; a hippie woman (La encuerada de Avandaro) and a man with an opposing point of view of the Festival and the counterculture. Published by Alarma, Mexico 1971.
- Piedra Rodante: "La verdad sobre Avándaro". La Onda magazine. In-depth reportages about the festival including the renown "Dios quiere que llueva para unirnos" by liberal priest Enrique Marroquin. Published by Editoriales Tribales S.A., México, 1971.
- Por Que?: "Avándaro: Miseria del régimen". Left-leaning magazine. In-depth reportage criticizing La Onda hippies and the festival, according to the magazine's political point of view. Published by Mario Menéndez. México 1971.
- Cancionero internacional de oro En Onda: "Festival 11 de septiembre de 1971". Music magazine. In-depth reportage about the festival and the band Peace & Love. México, 1971.
- Alerta: "Musica, droga y sexo: El frenesi de Avándaro". Exploitation magazine.. México, 1971.
- Figuras de la cancion: "La noche de Avándaro". Music magazine. In-depth reportage about the festival and the band Three Souls in my Mind. The magazine was an instant hit, selling 100,000 units in its release. México, 1971.
- POP: "Avándaro". Music magazine, which included the famous comic "Aliviane a la Madre Tierra" by Carlos Baca. México, 1971.

== Soundtracks ==
=== Live soundtrack ===
- Avandaro: Por fin...32 años después. Released by Luis de Llano's own company Bakita-Ludell Records and produced by Javier Tena. Initially to include only 12 live tracks, the final product includes 17 live tracks as recorded in the festival. The CD was presented at the Hard Rock Café in Mexico City. Comprehensive description by Armando Molina. Mexico, 2003.

=== Other soundtracks ===
- La Fachada de Piedra en Avandaro Valle de Bravo. An EP with four studio tracks produced by Discos Orfeon, Mexico 1971.
- Love Army en Avandaro. An EP with four studio tracks produced by Discos Orfeon, Mexico 1971.
- Los Free Minds en Avandaro Valle de Bravo. An EP of four studio tracks produced by Discos Orfeon, Mexico 1971.
- Los Soul Masters en Avandaro Valle de Bravo. An EP of four studio tracks produced by Discos Orfeon, Mexico 1971.
- Super Onda Chicana Vol. II: Vibraciones del 11 de Septiembre de 1971. Compilation by Fontana Records, which BILLBOARD magazine incorrectly labelled as a Live Recording of the event, Mexico 1971.
- Rosario: Avandaro: Hit single by the band Rosario, issued by Philips. Mexico, 1972.
- Rock en Avandaro. A compilation of twelve studio tracks produced by Discos Orfeon, re-issued in CD in 2005. Mexico 1972.
- Tinta Blanca: Avandaro. Hit single from Tinta Blanca, issued by Philips. Mexico, 1971.
- Tinta Blanca: Ecos de Avandaro. A re-issue of the band's 1971 hit single "Everything's gonna change" originally released by Philips. Re-issued by Cisne RAFF, Mexico 1973.
- Coleccion Avandaro. LP, CD and Cassette re-issues by Discos y Cintas Denver of Peace & Love and El Ritual's debut albums as well as Three Souls in my Mind's first two albums. Mexico, 1985-1987-1992-1999.
- Vibraciones de Avandaro. A compilation of studio tracks produced by PolyGram Records in 1994 and re-issued in 1996 to celebrate the festival's 25th anniversary. Mexico, 1994–1996.
- Festival de Rock y Ruedas en Avandaro Valle de Bravo. A compilation of studio tracks of different bands produced by Universal Music, Mexico 2002.
- Ecos de Avandaro. A double CD compilation with studio works of different bands. Produced by Sony BMG Music Entertainment, Mexico 2007.

== Curiosities ==
=== La encuerada de Avandaro ===
In spite the spirit of the age and that many people were completely naked swimming in the lake, walking in the middle of the crowd or even on stage without a problem as can be seen in the film, one woman, as the band La Division del Norte was playing, performed a striptease and caught the attention of the cameras. Her strip-tease was captured in the Gurrola film and shots of her appeared in many other media. When the footage and pictures were shown, the public baptized the woman as La encuerada(the naked woman). The woman was interviewed on-site by Elena Poniatowska; however, another interview, thought to have been real for decades, was published in the rock magazine Piedra Rodante in late 1971. In 2001, a bitter dispute between the owner of the magazine Manuel Aceves and then collaborator and music critic Oscar Sarquiz about the veracity of the interview took place in La Jornada newspaper. Finally, it was confirmed by Federico Rubli and further explained in the TV Azteca documentary that the interview was completely bogus. A few years after the festival the band Three Souls in my Mind composed a song called La encuerada de Avandaro which would become a hit in the underground movement.

=== The lost Telesistema Mexicano videotapes ===
Shot by Telesistema Mexicano cameramen under direction of Carlos Alazraki, those tapes were destined to become part of the planned TV special but were confiscated by their own company as soon as Luis de Llano showed up for work. Some footage of these tapes has been released since 1971 in movies and documentaries. In a 2001 interview, Luis de Llano recalled this situation and stated that may he find the tapes he will produce a movie with them though it is widely believed that they were sent to a storage in Tijuana, and that years later the whole place burnt out. He also made clear that, contrary to popular belief, the Secretariat of the Interior did not confiscate the tapes. An independent investigation, as shown in the Las glorias de Avandaro documentary, made as a request through the Federal Institute of access to information (IFAI) produced the official document proving that, indeed, the government did not confiscate the tapes.

=== Booked acts who failed to show up ===
- Love Army - As stated by the former band singer Pajaro Alberto in the Glorias de Avandaro documentary, the band suffered a minor car accident while on the road from Mexico City to Avandaro.
- La Tribu - As stated by Armando Molina in the live soundtrack, La Tribu cancelled at the very last minute but their record company, Polydor, sent La Division del Norte in their place.

=== Acts who declined to participate ===
- La Revolucion de Emiliano Zapata: As stated by member Javier Martin del Campo in the fair use trailer for Bajo el sol y frente a Dios documentary, the band was already booked for September 11 to appear in Monterrey. As the band was heading north, they saw thousands of fans going south for the festival.
- Javier Batiz: As stated on the fair use TV Azteca documentary La historia detras del mito: Avandaro, he considered Molina's payment offer too low. Later, he regretted his decision and tried, together with his sister singer Baby Batiz some members of Los Locos and his girlfriend, to get to the festival but were stranded in the traffic jam and his girlfriend at the time got ill while on the road.

== Legacy and Official Recognition in 2019 ==
The festival remains a controversial issue in Mexican society. After the festival, Mexican rock music was almost banned and was segregated to the so-called Hoyos Funkies, illegal gatherings in abandoned warehouses and supported mostly by the proletariat. A few years after the festival the hippie movement around the world collapsed and Mexico's La Onda was no exception, giving way to the ascension of other music genres of the mid-1970s such as Disco, Urban rock, Punk, Romantic Ballads, Heavy Metal, Progressive rock and, exclusively in the Mexican scene, the Rupestre movement championed by Rockdrigo Gonzalez.

The world-class quality of the bands that participated is generally praised by critics and public alike and the festival was little by little being acknowledged by official publications from respected institutions such as INEGI and COLMEX and in November 2019, right after the death of Armando Molina, Senator Marti Batres via Twitter gave his sympathies to the Molina family and made the announcement about the official recognition that the Senate would do to the Festival. On November 25, 2019, the Mexican Senate gave a formal recognition to different musicians who took part on the festival as well as a tribute to Molina, effectively putting an end to 48 years of Government censorship to Avandaro.

The festival is often regarded as a milestone in the history of rock music, the hippie movement and post-WWII Mexican society in general.

== 50th Anniversary ==
Three main events took place to commemorate the festival. One organized by Valle de Bravo's municipal government which included the participation of Luis de Llano and Carlos Alazraki as attendees. Other organized by the Mexico City government, which included the participation of Maricela Durazo and other Avandaro musicians together with the Symphony Orchestra of the National Polytechnic Institute of Mexico, conducted by Enrique Barrios, and another organized by producer Ricardo Ochoa -from Peace & Love- who organized several acts including live rock concerts with limited room capacity due to the COVID-19 pandemic, as well as live streaming events such as a conference by Luis de Llano, a videotaped message by filmmaker Alfredo Gurrola, an interview with father Enrique Marroquin, different contemporary rock bands, an Angel Blanco performance of Blas Galindo's electric guitar piece and a special homage to Armando Molina.

== Picture gallery ==
Photographer Pedro Meyer, himself an Avandaro attendee, produced a collection named Avandaro 1971, available online.

In 2016, the Museo Universitario del Chopo in Mexico City, exhibited a collection of Avandaro photographs taken by Graciela Iturbide.

== See also ==
- List of historic rock festivals
- List of historic music festivals
