= Pop Music Team =

Mexican rock band

- Origin: Mexico City, Mexico
- Genres: Psychedelic rock
- Years active: 1967-1972
- Labels: Orfeón
- Past members: Jorge Berry, Julio Vigueras, Alejandro Mehl, Francisco Boleu, Joaquin Carrillo.
- Website: www.orfeon.com.mx

Pop Music Team was a controversial Mexican rock band from the late 1960s and early 1970s. Their songs are sung mainly in Spanish.

It gained cult status because of their 1969 debut album Society is a shit, which included the controversial song "Tlatelolco" released a few months after the 1968 Tlatelolco massacre.

According to the 1999 Enrique Krauze documentary Yo no era un rebelde produced by Televisa, production of the album was halted by the band's recording company Orfeón and the song Tlatelolco had only two weeks of radio airplay due to censorship.

Despite the censorship the band was successful, played with The Doors in Mexico City and starred in different movies before disbanding in 1972 after the crackdown of La Onda movement by the Mexican government called "El Avandarazo".

== Notable members ==
- Jorge Berry: Vocalist. Notable news and sports anchor for Televisa.
- Julio Vigueras: Drummer. Former National Conservatory of Music director, conductor and virtuoso percussionist.
- Gabriel Alonso (keyboardist): Keyboards

== Discography ==
- Society is a shit (1969)
