= Humberto Rubalcaba Zuleta =

Humberto Cuitláhuac Rubalcaba Zuleta
- Born: October 29, 1943; Mexico City, Mexico
- Occupations: Impresario, Lawyer

Humberto Cuitláhuac Rubalcaba Zuleta (born October 29, 1943) is a Mexican attorney and former Mexican rock music impresario. He gained international recognition as the publisher of the book "Nosotros", the awarded short film "Tinta Blanca en Avandaro" as well as for being the defense attorney of the band Tinta Blanca during its protest outside Los Pinos when then President Echeverria decided to tackle La Onda movement after the Avandaro festival; however, his support to the counterculture was heavily used against him in future cases such as the arrest of the high-profile Interpol officer Aldana Ibarra.

In 1997, he was awarded with the prestigious "Medalla al Mérito" by then president Ernesto Zedillo.

He is an active member of the Academia Mexicana de Jurisprudencia y Legislacion (Mexican Academy of Jurisprudence and Legislation), of the Consejo Nacional de la Abogacia (National Advocacy Council) and former president of Asociación Mexicana de Abogados (Mexican Association of Lawyers).

== Literary works ==
- NOSOTROS. Published by Editorial Nosotros, Mexico 1972.
- La modernización del sistema judicial en México. Published by Editorial Progreso, Mexico 1993.

== Film work ==
- Tinta Blanca en Avandaro. Produced by Peliculas Candiani S.A., Mexico, 1971. Awarded the "Sombrero de Bronce" at the Guadalajara IVth International Short Film Festival, 1972.
