= Carlos Baca =

Mexican intellectual, artist, ecologist, yogi, and writer

- Born: Carlos Eduardo Baca Delgado; July 24, 1951; Mexico City, Mexico
- Occupation: Writer and ecologist
- Subject: Counterculture, Ecology, Nutrition.
- Literary movement: La Onda

Website
- www.carlosbaca.mx

Carlos Baca (born July 24, 1951) is a Mexican intellectual, cartoonist, visual artist, ecologist, yogi, writer and rock music critic. He is most recognized for being a key figure of the counterculture movement known as La Onda and the creator of the comic strip character Avandarito.

== Early years and studies ==
Born as Carlos Eduardo Baca Delgado in Mexico City, he was attracted to nature from early childhood, spending long hours in the famous Chapultepec Woods. From 1969 to 1979 he studied Yoga and vegetarianism at the Universal Great Brotherhood becoming an international teacher and lecturer afterwards.

== Counterculture years: Communal life, Avandaro and La Onda ==
In 1968 he was invited to collaborate with the magazine México Canta and by 1969 he was appointed its director. At the same time he was also hired as collaborator in the POP magazine, writing about philosophy and ecology and making memorable interviews to artists such as Juan Gabriel, Ravi Shankar, Love Army, Jim Morrison, Joan Manuel Serrat, Janis Joplin among others.

In 1971, together with other La Onda stars such as Mayita Campos, José Roberto Hill and Margarita Bauche, he funded the commune La Nueva Familia (The new family) in San Lorenzo Acopilco, outside Mexico City. The hippie commune was notable for its production of bread and cereals.

In September of the same year he went to the Avandaro Festival to make a reportage on site, but since he was highly revered by the jipitecas and his La Onda peers, he was persuaded by Armando Molina, the festival's appointed music coordinator, to inaugurate the festival with a yoga session and an ecology lecture.

In the aftermath of the festival he created the comic strip "Aliviane a la Madre Tierra" (Aid to Mother Earth) including its famous character "Avandarito" which was included as part of the POP magazine and was printed from 1971 to 1973.

== Later years ==
By 1974 as the hippie movement waned world wide and the commune members dispersed each pursuing their own goals in their careers, Baca focused his attention to further his knowledge of nature studying in Taos, New Mexico and attending several seminars. He published his book Nutrición Natural al Alcance de Todos (Natural nutrition for all) in 1976, starting a notable career which expands 4 decades as a lecturer and writer of ecology, nutrition and environmental issues. He founded ALECOS, a club destined to promote healthy lifestyles and alternative medicine.

== Legacy ==
His authoritative texts about the counterculture are still being re-published in new books on the subject.

On the special occasion of the 40th anniversary of the Avandaro Festival, he was invited by his peers to an event named "Estrellas de Avandaro" (Avandaro stars) and received coverage by publications like the Rolling Stone and El Universal.

== Literature ==
- Aliviane a la Madre Tierra. Comic strip by Carlos Baca, revista POP, Mexico 1971-1973.
- Nutrición Natural al Alcance de Todos. By Carlos Baca, illustrated by Efrén Maldonado. Editorial Posada, Mexico 1976.

== Filmography ==
- Las glorias de Avandaro. Documentary by Arturo Lara Lozano, Carlos Cruz, Manuel Martinez, Angel Velazquez and Arnulfo Martinez y Torres, Mexico 2005.
- Bajo el sol y frente a Dios. Independently produced documentary by Arturo Lara Lozano, Mexico 2011.
