= José Roberto Hill =

Mexican actor

- Born: José Roberto Hill del Rivero; January 13, 1945; Mexico City, Mexico
- Died: December 20, 2005 (aged 60); Mexico City, Mexico
- Occupation: Actor
- Years active: 1964-2005
- Spouse: Margarita Bauche (divorced)
- Children: 2

José Roberto Hill (January 13, 1945 – December 20, 2005) was a Mexican actor.

Born as José Roberto Hill del Rivero in Mexico City, he appeared in plays, films, and telenovelas (soap operas). He is best remembered for the iconic films Cristo 70 (Christ 70) and Ha entrado una mujer (A woman has entered).

At the height of his career he, together with his then-wife musician Margarita Bauche and other La Onda figures like Mayita Campos and Carlos Baca founded the commune La Nueva Familia (The new family) in the outskirts of Mexico city. The commune gained wide spread reputation as one of the few fully functional hippie communes in Mexico.

The couple had two daughters, artists Maya Karunna and Maria Karunna, founders of Caló, a 1990s Mexican rap band. He was the uncle of actress Vanessa Bauche.

Hill died as a result of the injuries of an assault in his department on December 20, 2005, aged 60.
