= Aca Joe =

Clothing line that originated in Acapulco

ACA JOE is a clothing line for men, women, boys and girls that originated in Acapulco in the 1970s. By. 1978, ACA JOE was well established as a clothing retailer, with over 75 stores in various cities throughout Mexico, including: Acapulco, Cancun, Puerto Vallarta, Mazatlán, and Mexico City. ACA JOE specializes in well-designed cotton clothing inspired by the beach lifestyle of Acapulco.

Joseph Rank, a Los Angeles clothing designer, is the founder and owner of ACA JOE. The company's major growth came after Rank teamed with Harry R. Kraatz and William A. Meyer, in the early 1980s to take over the Inmar Corporation. Inmar's retail outlets were transformed into ACA JOE stores and the company name was changed to ACA JOE INTERNATIONAL.

In the mid-1980s, there were more than 100 ACA JOE stores around the U.S., and the company's stock was the fastest rising stock on Nasdaq in 1985. The company's stock was deleted from the Nasdaq over-the-counter trading system on April 1, 1988, because of the company's failure to meet Nasdaq's capital and surplus requirements.

In the 1990s, ACA JOE focused on its market in Mexico and was sold in over 35 shopping center and beach stores and featured in the Palacio de Hierro department stores. In the 2000s (decade), ACA JOE was sold in the Liverpool department stores and Costco in Mexico.

Since 2007, ACA JOE has been exclusively sold through La Comercial Mexicana and Soriana in Mexico. The logo was designed by Mexican American artist Joe Vera.
