= Joe Vera =

American graphic designer (born 1941)

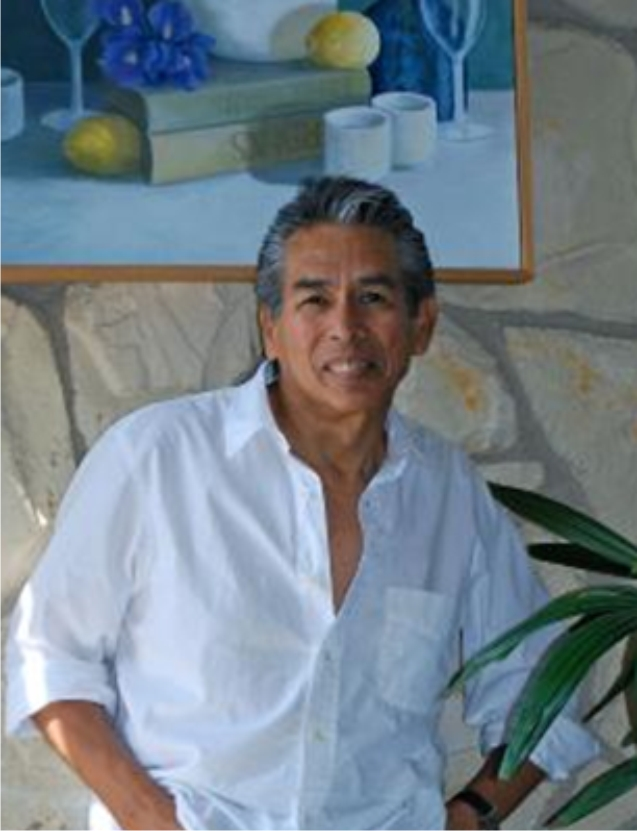
- Born: April 20, 1941 (age 84); Pomona, California, United States
- Known for: Graphic Design
- Notable work: Avandaro Festival Poster, Cancun Emblem.
- Website: https://web.archive.org/web/20141218081624/http://veradzn.com/

Joe Vera (born April 20, 1941, Pomona, California, United States) is a Mexican-American graphic designer, creator of some of the most recognized logos of the early 1970s in Mexico, such as the Emblem of Cancun in 1974 and the poster for the Avandaro Festival of 1971.

== Early years ==
The son of artists, he was born as José Guadalupe Vera Gomez. His first introduction to the arts came by playing the lead role in "Las Posadas" Mexican Christmas play at Padua Hills theater, Claremont California. As college student he decided to enter the prestigious Art Center College of Design.

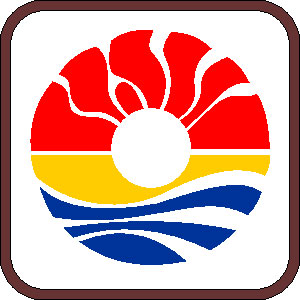
The emblem of Cancún

== Career ==
In 1968 he moved to Mexico City in order to work with designer and artist Giancarlo Novi and his fame grew rapidly among contemporary artists. Soon thereafter Telesistema Mexicano producer, Luis de Llano Macedo, commissioned him to design the Avandaro Rock Festival poster of 1971. This was going to open many doors for him and in 1974, having his own studio named Joe Vera & Asociados, was commissioned by the federal government to design his most famous logo to date, the Cancun Emblem.

In 1986 Joe Vera returned to the United States and established the firm Vera Design in Los Angeles. He designed the logotype of Aca Joe and special designs for brands like Danone, Purina, among others.

== Bibliography ==
- Trademarks and Symbols of the world. Author: Yasaburo Kuwayama. Published by: Mitsuru Takahashi. Tokyo, Japón 1987.
- Avándaro: Una Leyenda. Author. Juan Jiménez Izquierdo. Published by: ERIDU Producciones. Mexico City, México 2012.
- Print casebooks 4. Author: Martin Fox. Published by: RC Publications. Washington, USA 1980.
