= Memorial de Tlatelolco =

Poem by the Mexican poet Rosario Castellanos

Coordinates: 19.45145965436633°N 99.13641894612266°W

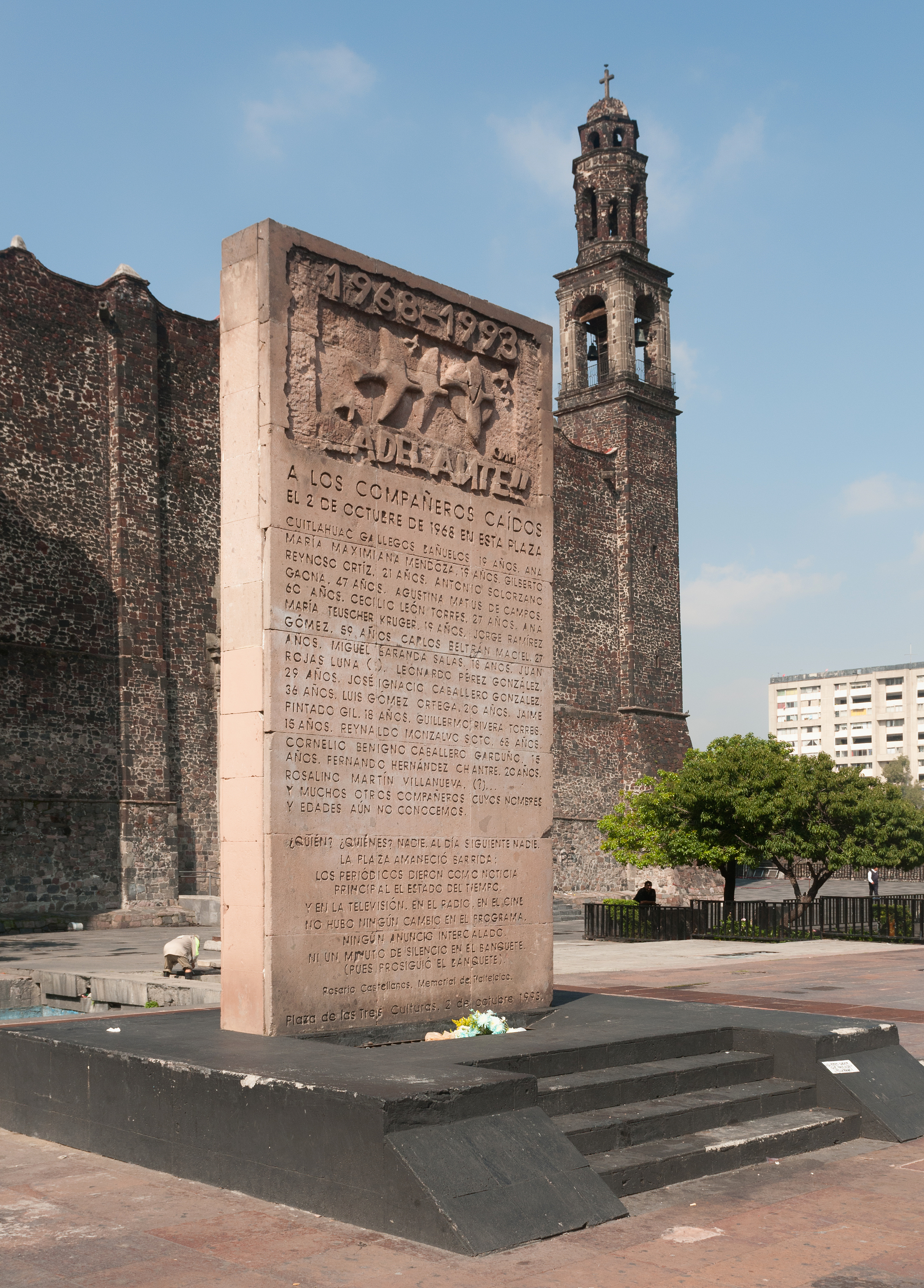
Memorial stele at Plaza de las Tres Culturas featuring the third stanza (erected October 2, 1993)

Memorial de Tlatelolco ("Memorial of Tlatelolco") is a poem by the Mexican poet Rosario Castellanos (1925–1974). It is widely regarded as one of the most striking literary responses to the Tlatelolco massacre of 2 October 1968, which took place in the Tlatelolco district of Mexico City during the student movement of that year.

== Poem ==
Castellanos composed the poem in response to the massacre at the Plaza de las Tres Culturas. The poem denounces the violent repression carried out by government forces against students and other demonstrators, while also addressing the subsequent silence that followed the events. It forms part of the broader body of artistic and literary works inspired by the 1968 movement in Mexico. It was later included in the book La noche de Tlatelolco by Elena Poniatowska, which documents testimonies and accounts of the massacre.

The poem's third stanza was subsequently engraved on a monument commemorating the 25th anniversary of the events on the site.

== Content ==
La oscuridad engendra la violencia
y la violencia pide oscuridad
para cuajar el crimen.
Por eso el dos de octubre aguardó hasta la noche
Para que nadie viera la mano que empuñaba
El arma, sino sólo su efecto de relámpago.

¿Y a esa luz, breve y lívida, quién? ¿Quién es el que mata?
¿Quiénes los que agonizan, los que mueren?
¿Los que huyen sin zapatos?
¿Los que van a caer al pozo de una cárcel?
¿Los que se pudren en el hospital?
¿Los que se quedan mudos, para siempre, de espanto?

¿Quién? ¿Quiénes? Nadie. Al día siguiente, nadie.
La plaza amaneció barrida; los periódicos
dieron como noticia principal
el estado del tiempo.
Y en la televisión, en el radio, en el cine
no hubo ningún cambio de programa,
ningún anuncio intercalado ni un
minuto de silencio en el banquete.
(Pues prosiguió el banquete).

No busques lo que no hay: huellas, cadáveres
que todo se le ha dado como ofrenda a una diosa,
a la Devoradora de Excrementos.

No hurgues en los archivos pues nada consta en actas.
Mas he aquí que toco una llaga: es mi memoria.
Duele, luego es verdad. Sangre con sangre
y si la llamo mía traiciono a todos.

Recuerdo, recordamos.
Ésta es nuestra manera de ayudar a que amanezca
sobre tantas conciencias mancilladas,
sobre un texto iracundo sobre una reja abierta,
sobre el rostro amparado tras la máscara.
Recuerdo, recordamos
hasta que la justicia se siente entre nosotros.

Darkness begets violence
and violence demands darkness
to cover its crime.
That’s why October 2nd waited till nightfall
so no one could see the hand that gripped
the weapon, just its flashing effects.

And in that light, brief and fierce, who? Who is it that kills?
Who are those who agonize, those who die?
Those who flee without shoes?
Those who end up in a hole in some jail?
Those who rot away in the hospital?
Those who fall silent, forever, from fear?

Who? Whom? No one. The next day, no one.
Dawn found the plaza swept; the headline
in the newspapers
was the weather forecast.
And on TV, on the radio, at the movies
there was no change in the programming,
no newsflash, not even a
moment of silence at the banquet
(but the banquet went on).

Don’t look for what isn’t there: traces, bodies
for it has all been given in offering to a goddess,
to the Devourer of Excrement.

Don’t dig through the files, for nothing’s been recorded.
Yet behold – I touch a sore: it is my memory.
It hurts, so it is true. Blood for blood
and if I call it mine, I betray them all.

I remember, we remember.
This is our way of helping the light shine
upon so many sullied consciences,
upon a wrathful text on open bars,
upon the face obscured behind the mask.
I remember, we remember
until we feel justice at last here among us.

== See also ==
- Amulet (novel)

== Bibliography ==
- Elena Poniatowska, Massacre in Mexico. Translated by Helen R. Lane (New York 1975), ISBN 978-0670461377.
- In Memory of Tlatelolco by Rosario Castellanos, translated and edited by David Bowles (15 February 2018), in: Voices of Mexico (English language journal of UNAM), no. 106, 2018, p. 104–105. PDF
