= Jipitecas =

The jipitecas (sometimes called "xipitecas") were the Mexican hippies of the late 1960s and early 1970s. The term was coined by scholar Enrique Marroquin in the late 1960s and used widely in the media afterwards. Other terms for referring Mexican hippies were "macizos" and "onderos", since they were part of the broader counterculture movement known as "La Onda" (The Wave).

== See also ==
- Festival Avándaro
