= Tlatelolco massacre =

1968 massacre of protestors in Mexico

- Part of the Mexican Movement of 1968 and the Mexican Dirty War
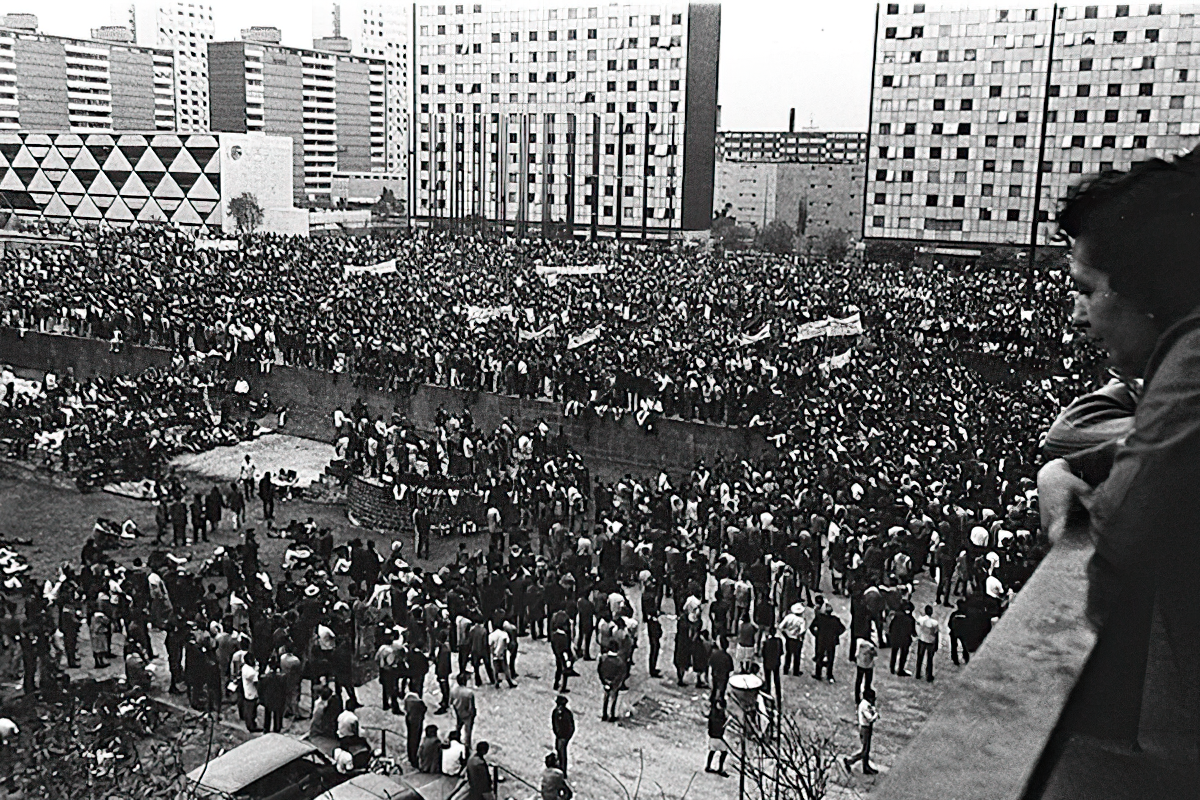
- Plaza de las Tres Culturas, October 2, 1968
- Location: 19°27′4″N 99°08′14″W; Plaza de las Tres Culturas, Mexico City, Mexico
- Date: October 2, 1968; 58 years ago c. 6:15 p.m. (UTC−6)
- Target: Protestors, political and social opposition
- Attack type: Massacre, political repression
- Deaths: 350–500
- Injuries: 1000+
- Perpetrators: Government of Mexico; Mexican Armed Forces

The Tlatelolco massacre (Spanish: Masacre de Tlatelolco) was a military massacre committed by the Mexican Armed Forces against the students of the National Autonomous University of Mexico (UNAM), the National Polytechnic Institute (IPN) and other universities in Mexico.

The massacre followed a series of large demonstrations known as the Mexican Movement of 1968 and is considered part of the Mexican Dirty War when the U.S.-backed Institutional Revolutionary Party (PRI) government violently repressed political and social opposition. The event occurred ten days before the opening ceremony of the 1968 Summer Olympics, which were carried out as scheduled.

On October 2, 1968, in the Tlatelolco section of Mexico City, the Mexican Armed Forces opened fire on a group of unarmed civilians who were protesting the upcoming Olympics in the Plaza de las Tres Culturas. The Mexican government and news media claimed the Armed Forces had been provoked by protesters shooting at them, but government documents made public since 2000 suggest that snipers had been employed by the government.

The number of deaths resulting from the event is disputed. According to U.S. national security archives, American analyst Kate Doyle documented the deaths of 44 people, but estimates of the actual death toll range from 300 to 400, with eyewitnesses reporting hundreds dead. Additionally, the head of the Federal Directorate of Security reported that 1,345 people were arrested.

== Background ==
The year 1968 in Mexico City was a time of expansiveness and the breaking down of barriers: a time for forging alliances among students, workers, and the marginal urban poor and challenging the political regime. It was a time of great hope, seemingly on the verge of transformation. Students were out in the streets, in the plazas, on the buses, forming brigades, "going to the people." There were movement committees at each school and heady experiences of argument, exploration, and democratic practice. There was no central leader. Families were drawn in, whole apartment buildings and neighborhoods. A revolution was happening - not Che's revolution - but a revolution from within the system, nonviolent, driven by euphoria, conviction, and the excitement of experimentation on the ground.

— Dissent Magazine

Mexican President Gustavo Díaz Ordaz struggled to maintain public order during a time of rising social tensions by suppressing independent labor unions and farmers and heavy-handedly trying to direct the economy. In 1958, under the previous administration of Adolfo López Mateos (when Díaz Ordaz was Minister of the Interior), labor leader Demetrio Vallejo had been arrested, and later on, in May 1962 peasant activist Rubén Jaramillo was murdered.

Arising from reaction to the government's violent repression of a July 1968 fight between rival porros (gangs), the student movement in Mexico City quickly grew to include large segments of the university students who were dissatisfied with the regime of the PRI, especially at the Autonomous National University of Mexico and the National Polytechnic Institute, but also at other universities. After a fight by rival student groups in central Mexico City was broken up violently by a large contingent of police, university students formed a National Strike Council (CNH) to organize protests and present demands to the government. Large-scale protests grew in size over the summer as the opening of the Olympic Games in mid-October grew nearer, and Minister of the Interior Luis Echeverría was expected to keep public order. On October 2, 1968, a large, peaceful march arrived at the Plaza of the Three Cultures for the usual speeches. However, the Díaz Ordaz government and troops marched into the plaza and gunmen in surrounding buildings opened fire on the unarmed civilians in what is now known as the Tlatelolco massacre.

== Massacre ==
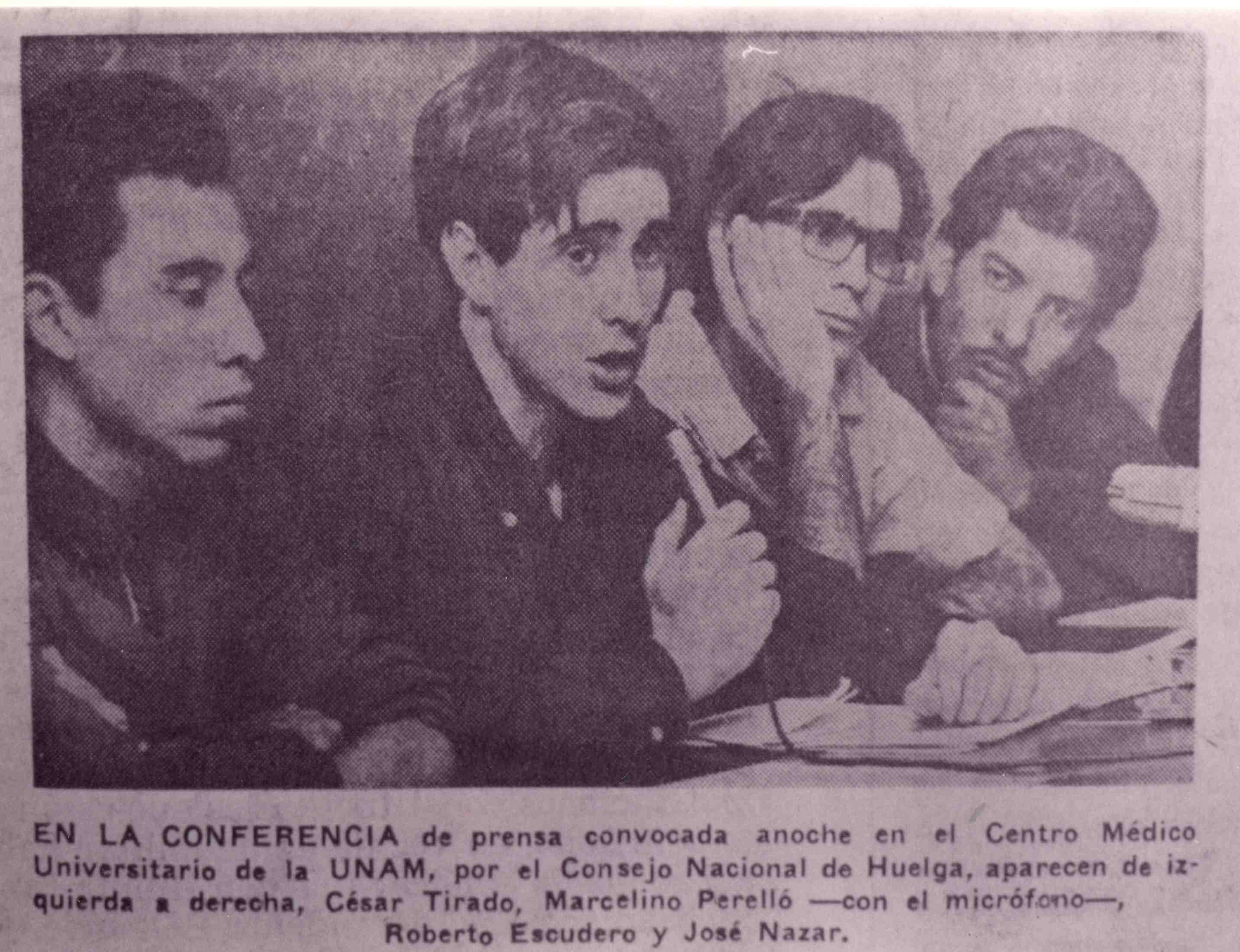
Marcelino Perelló, a leader of student groups at a press conference. Mexico, October 6, 1968.

On October 2, 1968, around 10,000 university and high school students gathered in the Plaza de las Tres Culturas to protest the government's actions and listen peacefully to speeches. Many men and women not associated with the CNH gathered in the plaza to watch and listen; they included neighbors from the Residential complex, bystanders and children. The students had congregated outside the Chihuahua Building, a three-moduled thirteen-story apartment complex in the Plaza de las Tres Culturas. Among their chants were ¡No queremos olimpiadas, queremos revolución! ("We don't want Olympics, we want revolution!"). Rally organizers did not try to call off the protest when they noticed an increased military presence in the area.

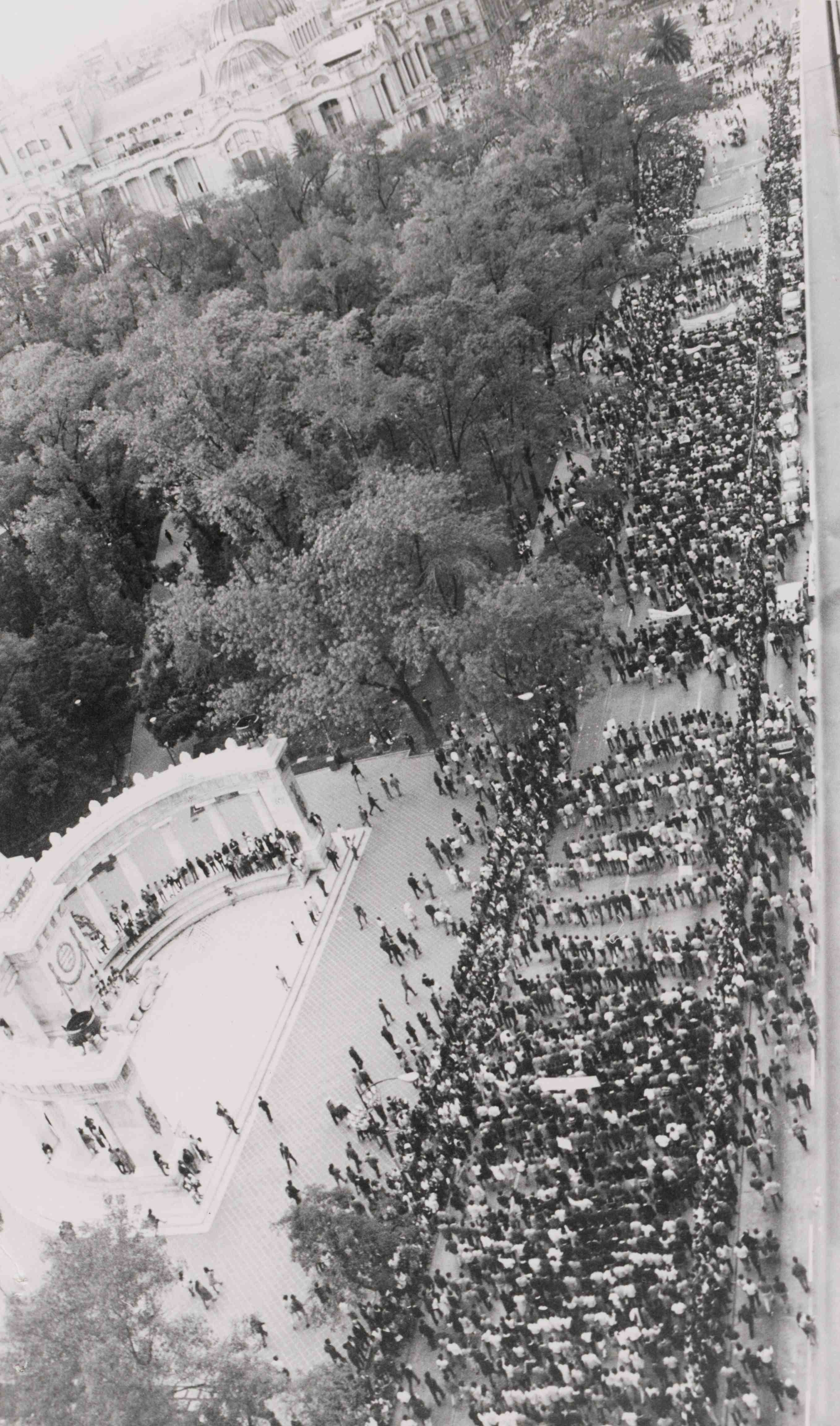
Students' demonstration, Mexico City, August 27, 1968

Two helicopters, one from the police and another from the army, flew over the plaza. Around 5:55 p.m. red flares were shot from the nearby S.R.E. (Mexican Ministry of Foreign Relations) tower. Around 6:15 p.m., another two flares were shot, this time from a helicopter (one was green and another one was red) as 5,000 soldiers, 200 tankettes and trucks surrounded the plaza. Much of what proceeded after the first shots were fired in the plaza remained ill-defined for decades after 1968. Records and information released by American and Mexican government sources since 2000 have enabled researchers to study the events and draw new conclusions.

The question of who fired first remained unresolved years after the massacre. The Mexican government said gunfire from the surrounding apartments prompted the army's attack. But the students said that the helicopters appeared to signal the army to fire into the crowd. Journalist Elena Poniatowska culled interviews from those present and described events in her book Massacre in Mexico: "Flares suddenly appeared in the sky overhead and everyone automatically looked up. The first shots were heard then. The crowd panicked [and] started running in all directions." Despite CNH efforts to restore order, the crowd on the plaza quickly fell into chaos.

Shortly thereafter, the Olympia Battalion, a secret government branch made for the security of the Olympic Games composed of soldiers, police officers, and federal security agents, were ordered to arrest the leaders of the CNH and advanced into the plaza. The Olympia Battalion members wore white gloves or white handkerchiefs tied to their left hands to distinguish themselves from the civilians and prevent the soldiers from shooting them. Captain Ernesto Morales Soto stated that "immediately upon sighting a flare in the sky, the prearranged signal, we were to seal off the aforementioned two entrances and prevent anyone from entering or leaving."

The ensuing assault into the plaza left dozens dead and many more wounded in its aftermath. The soldiers responded by firing into the nearby buildings and into the crowd, hitting not only the protesters, but also watchers and bystanders. Demonstrators and passersby alike, including students, journalists (including Italian reporter Oriana Fallaci), and children, were hit by bullets, and mounds of bodies soon lay on the ground. Meanwhile, on the Chihuahua building, where the speakers stood, Olympia Battalion members pushed people and ordered them to lie on the ground near the elevator walls. People claim these men were the people who shot first at the soldiers and the crowd.

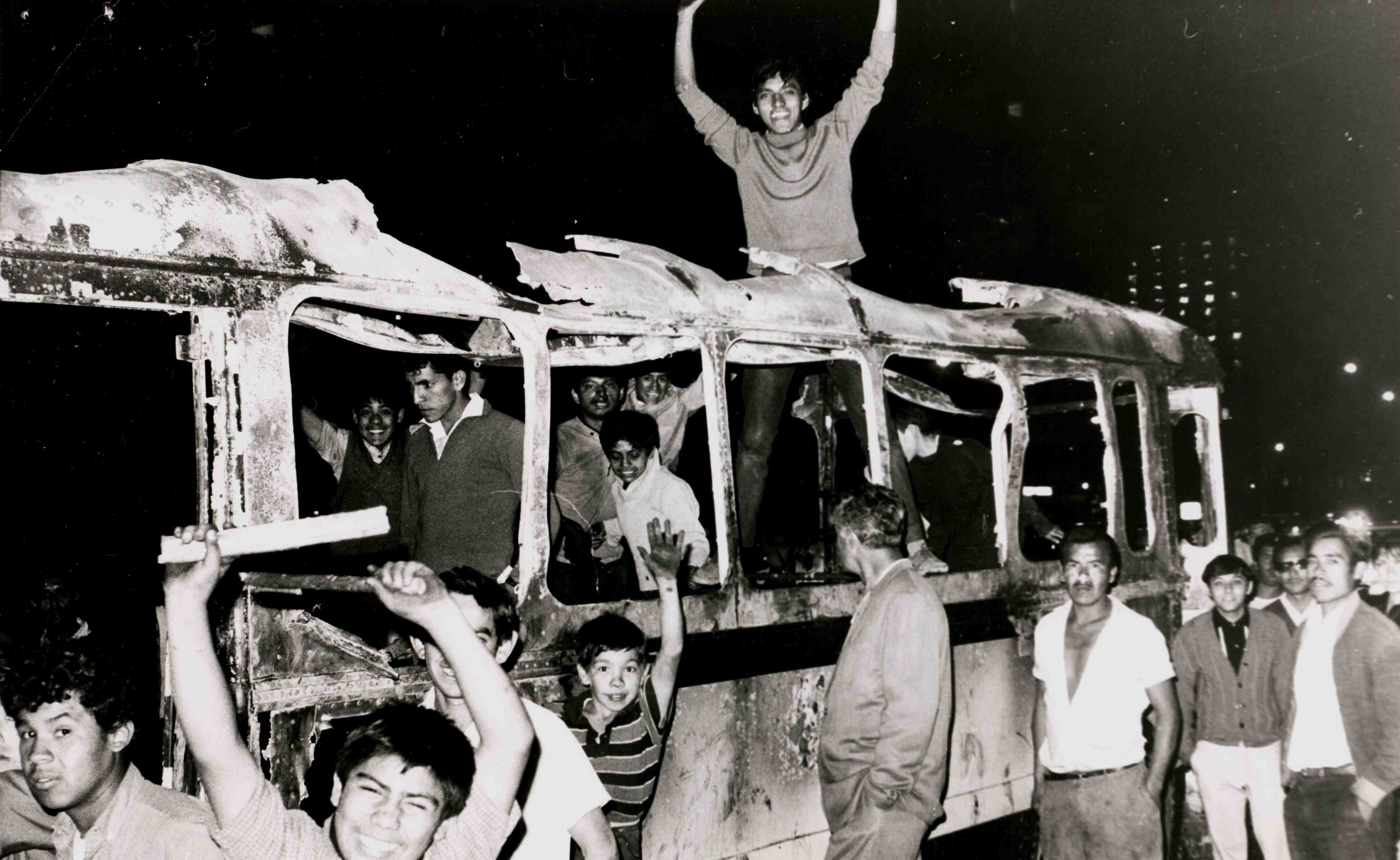
Students in a burned bus

Video evidence also points out that at least two companies of the Olympia Battalion hid themselves in the nearby apartment buildings and set up a machine gun in an apartment in the Molino del Rey Building, where a sister-in-law of then-Secretary of State Luis Echeverría lived. In addition, many snipers were positioned on the roof of the church of Santiago de Tlatelolco and many people involved, including the ones who fired the first two flares, were present at the nearby convent and the Foreign Relations Tower; there was a machine gun on the 19th floor and a video camera on the 17th floor. Video evidence shows 10 white-gloved men leaving the church and bumping into soldiers, who point their weapons at them. One of the men shows what appears to be an ID and they are let go.

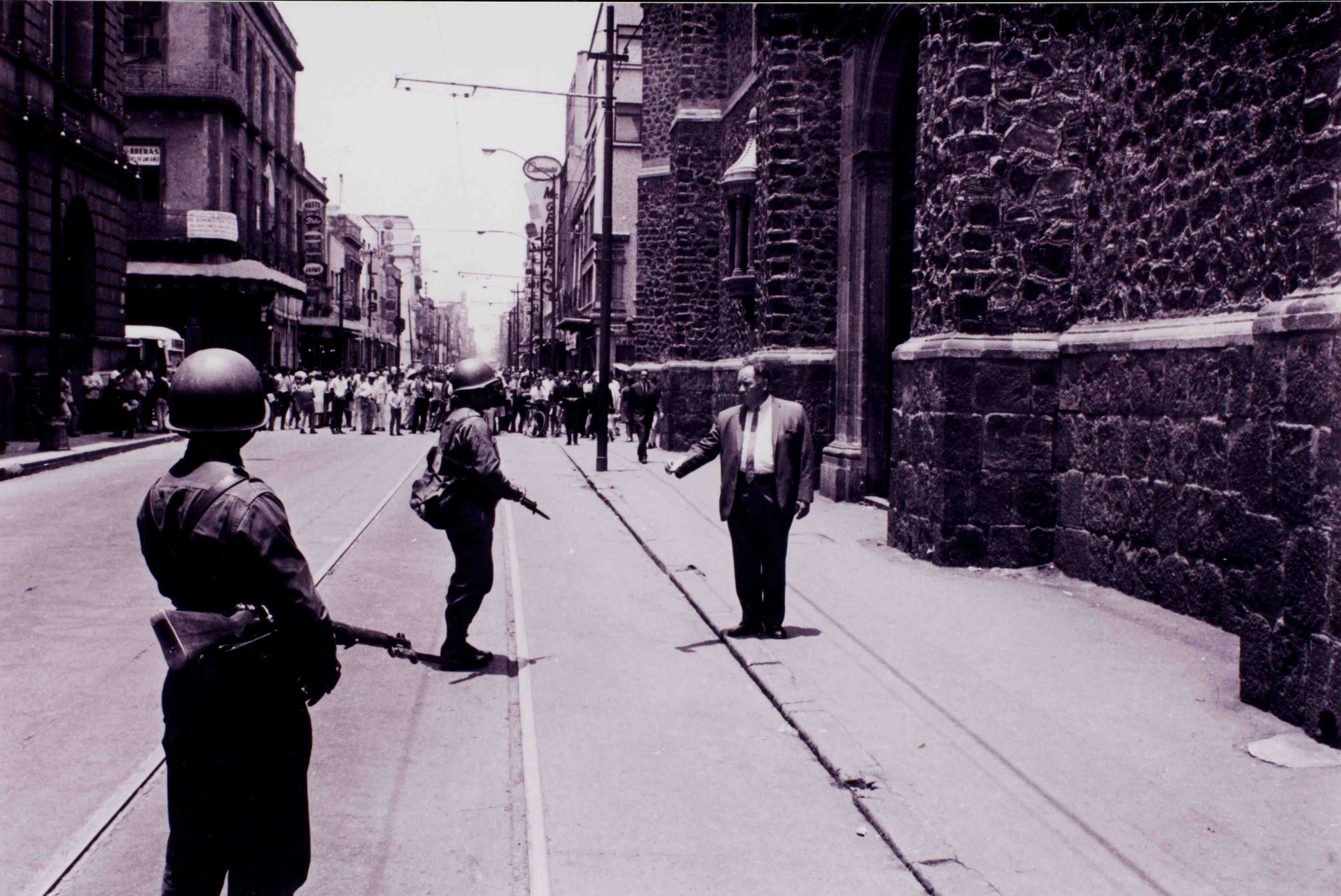
Mexican soldiers at the streets. July 30, 1968

By the next morning, newspapers reported that 20 to 28 people had been killed, hundreds wounded, and hundreds more arrested. El Día's morning headline on October 3, 1968, read: "Criminal Provocation at the Tlatelolco Meeting Causes Terrible Bloodshed." A 2001 investigation revealed documents showing that the snipers were members of the Presidential Guard, who were instructed to fire on the military forces in order to provoke them.

== Investigation and aftermath ==
In 1977, seven years after the end of his presidency, Gustavo Díaz Ordaz was appointed ambassador to Spain by then-President José López Portillo. His appointment revived the debate over his responsibility regarding the Tlatelolco massacre, to which Díaz Ordaz responded by firmly defending his handling of the incident; in an interview on 13 April 1977, shortly before leaving for Spain, a journalist told the former president that his appointment as ambassador "touched a sore spot", to which an upset Díaz Ordaz replied:

"I'm very proud of having been President of the Republic and having thus served Mexico, but what I'm most proud of, from those six years, is the year 1968, because it allowed me to serve and save the country, whether you all like it or not, with something other than hours of bureaucratic work [...], fortunately, we got through, and if it hadn't been for that, you wouldn't have the chance, little boy, of being here asking questions."

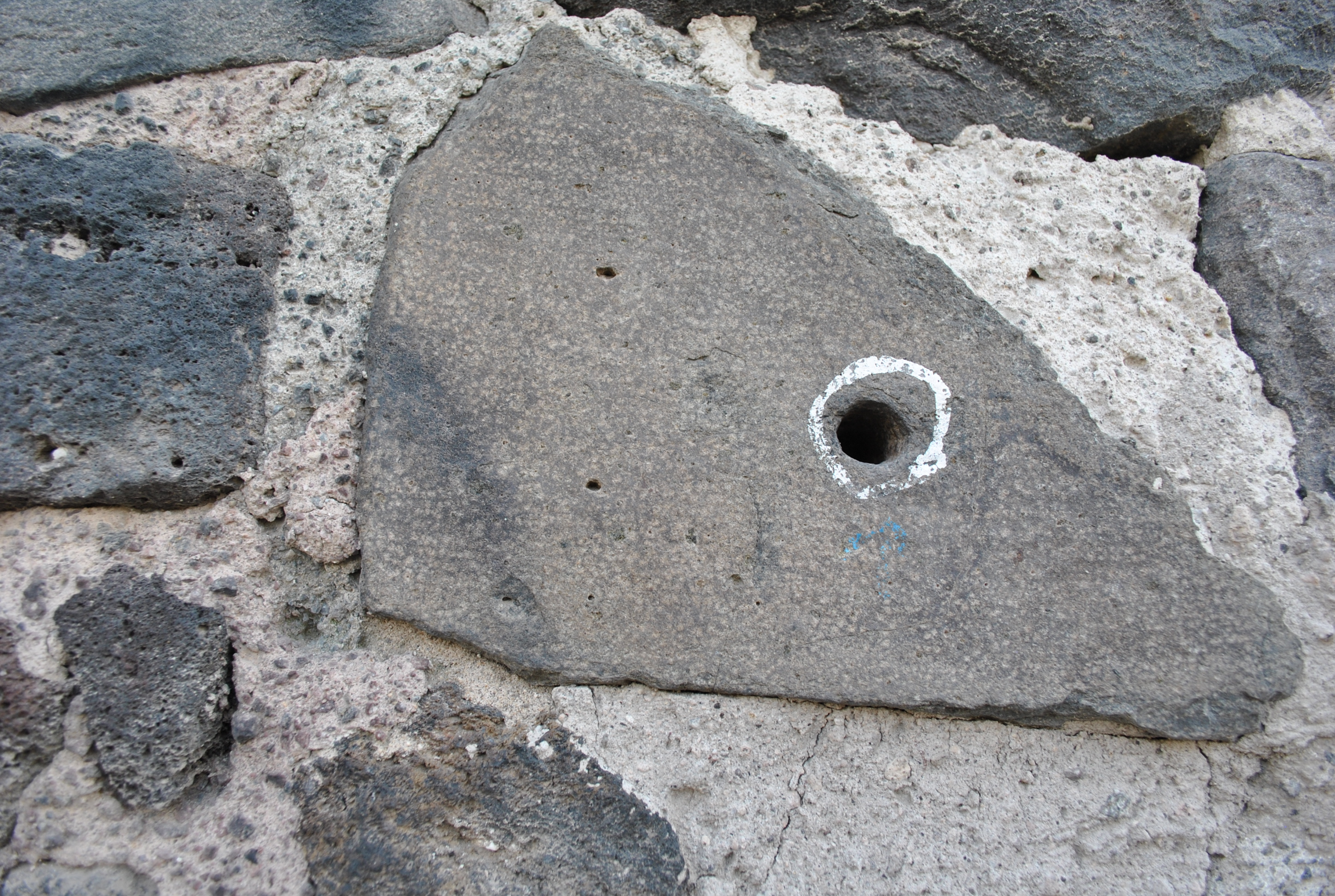
Bullet hole in the temple wall of Santiago Tlaltelolco

In 1998, President Ernesto Zedillo, on the 30th anniversary of the Tlatelolco massacre, authorized a congressional investigation into the events of October 2. However, the PRI government continued its recalcitrance and did not release official government documents pertaining to the incident. In a 2002 All Things Considered radio interview with Kate Doyle, director of the Mexican Documentation Project for the US National Security Archive, she described the PRI government's investigations: "I mean, there have been a number of investigations throughout the years. In fact, former president Miguel de la Madrid was interviewed yesterday in the press, and said that he had asked the military and the interior secretary for documents and for photographs of the demonstrations, and was subjected to tremendous political pressure not to investigate. And when he continued to press, the military and the interior ministry claimed that their files were in disarray and they had nothing."

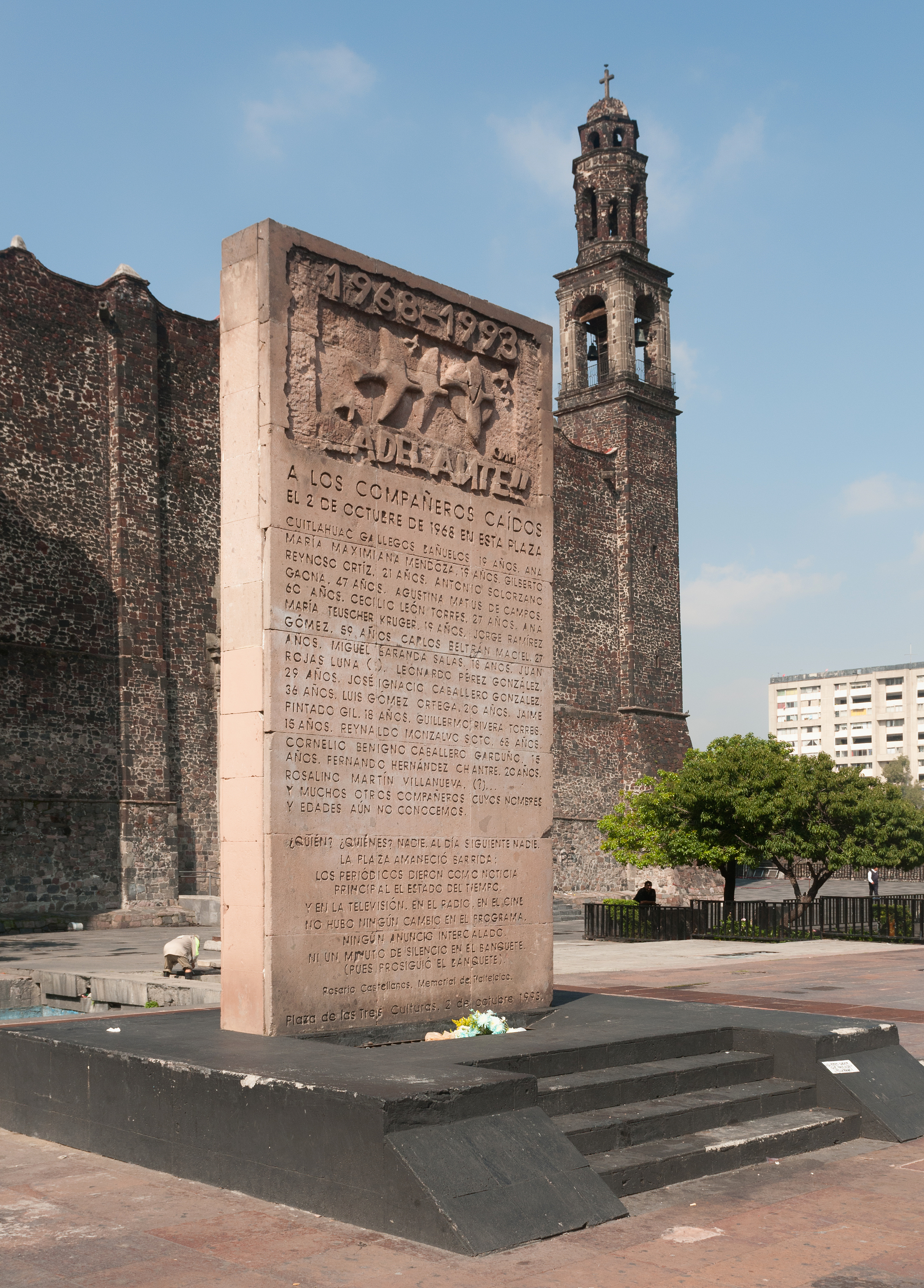
Memorial stele dedicated to the massacre victims at Tlatelolco, with a poem by Rosario Castellanos below

Enduring questions remained after "La Noche Triste" (the Sad Night) that have taken the Mexican government over 30 years to answer. Eventually in 2001, President Vicente Fox, the president who ended the 70-year reign of the PRI, attempted to resolve the question of who had orchestrated the massacre. President Fox ordered the release of previously classified documents concerning the 1968 massacre. The documents revealed that Elena Poniatowska's synthesis of the events that October night was accurate, as Kate Doyle uncovered,

Thousands of students gathered in the square and, as you say, the government version is that the students opened fire. Well, there's been pretty clear evidence now that there was a unit that was called the Brigada Olímpica, or the Olympic Brigade, that was made up of special forces of the presidential guard, who opened fire from the buildings that surrounded the square, and that that was the thing that provoked the massacre.

President Fox also appointed Ignacio Carrillo Prieto in 2002 to prosecute those responsible for ordering the massacre. In 2006, former President Luis Echeverría was arrested on charges of genocide. However, in March 2009, after a convoluted appeal process, the genocide charges against Echeverria were dismissed. The Mexican newspaper The News reported that "a tribunal of three circuit court judges ruled that there was not enough proof to link Echeverria to the violent suppression of hundreds of protesting students on Oct. 2, 1968." Despite the ruling, prosecutor Carrillo Prieto said he would continue his investigation and seek charges against Echeverria before the United Nations International Court of Justice and the Inter-American Human Rights Commission.

== United States government records ==
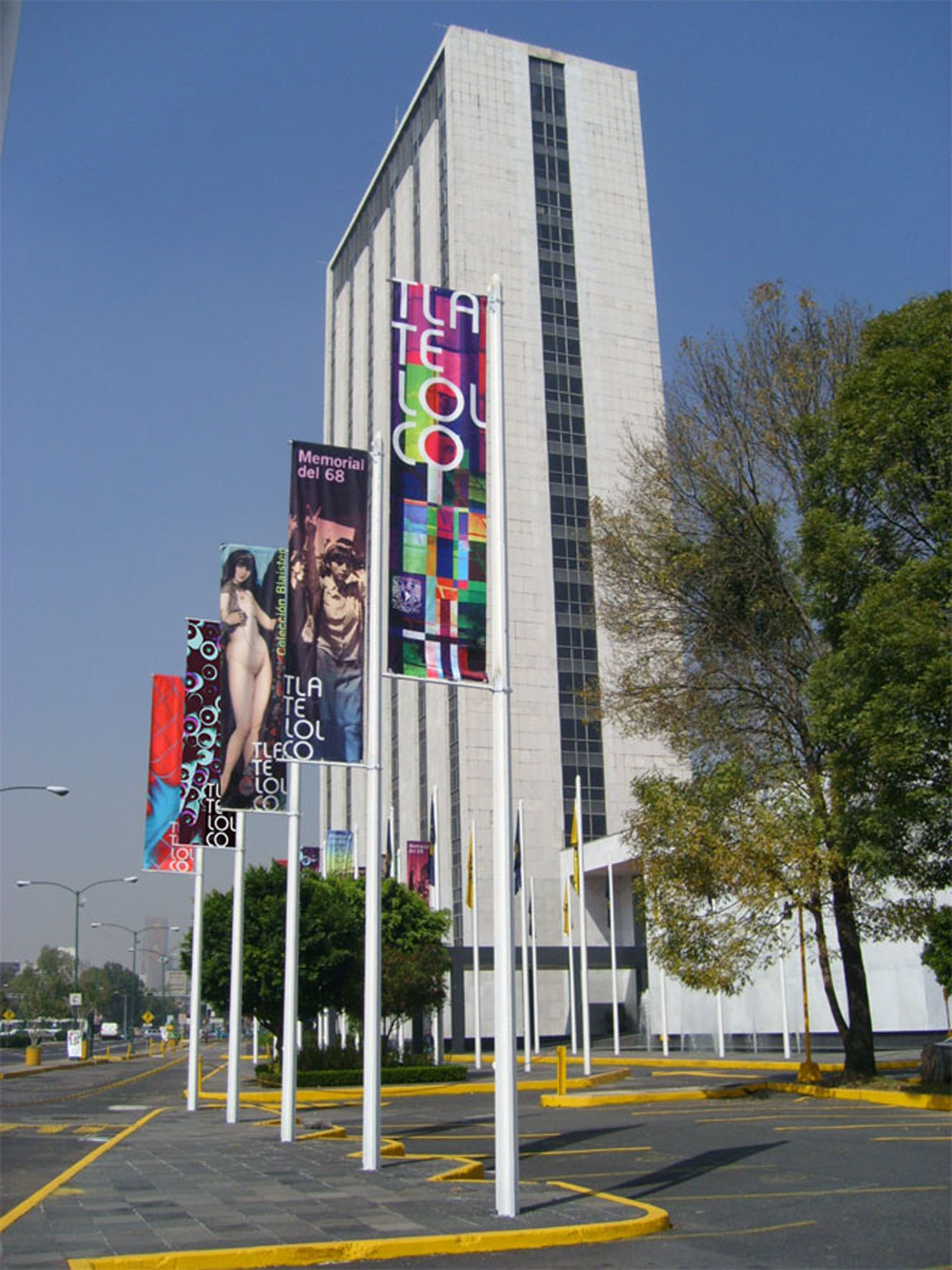
The old foreign ministry building sits where the event took place.

In October 2003, the role of the United States government in the massacre was publicized when the National Security Archive at George Washington University published a series of records from the CIA, the Pentagon, the State Department, the FBI and the White House which were released in response to Freedom of Information Act requests.

The documents detail:

- That in response to Mexican government concerns over the security of the Olympic Games, the Pentagon sent military radios, weapons, ammunition and riot control training material to Mexico before and during the crisis.
- That the CIA station in Mexico City produced almost daily reports concerning developments within the university community and the Mexican government from July to October. Six days before the massacre at Tlatelolco, both Echeverría and head of Federal Security (DFS) Fernando Gutiérrez Barrios told the CIA that "the situation will be under complete control very shortly".
- That the Díaz Ordaz government "arranged" to have student leader Sócrates Campos Lemus accuse dissident PRI politicians such as Carlos Madrazo of funding and orchestrating the student movement.

== Remembrance ==
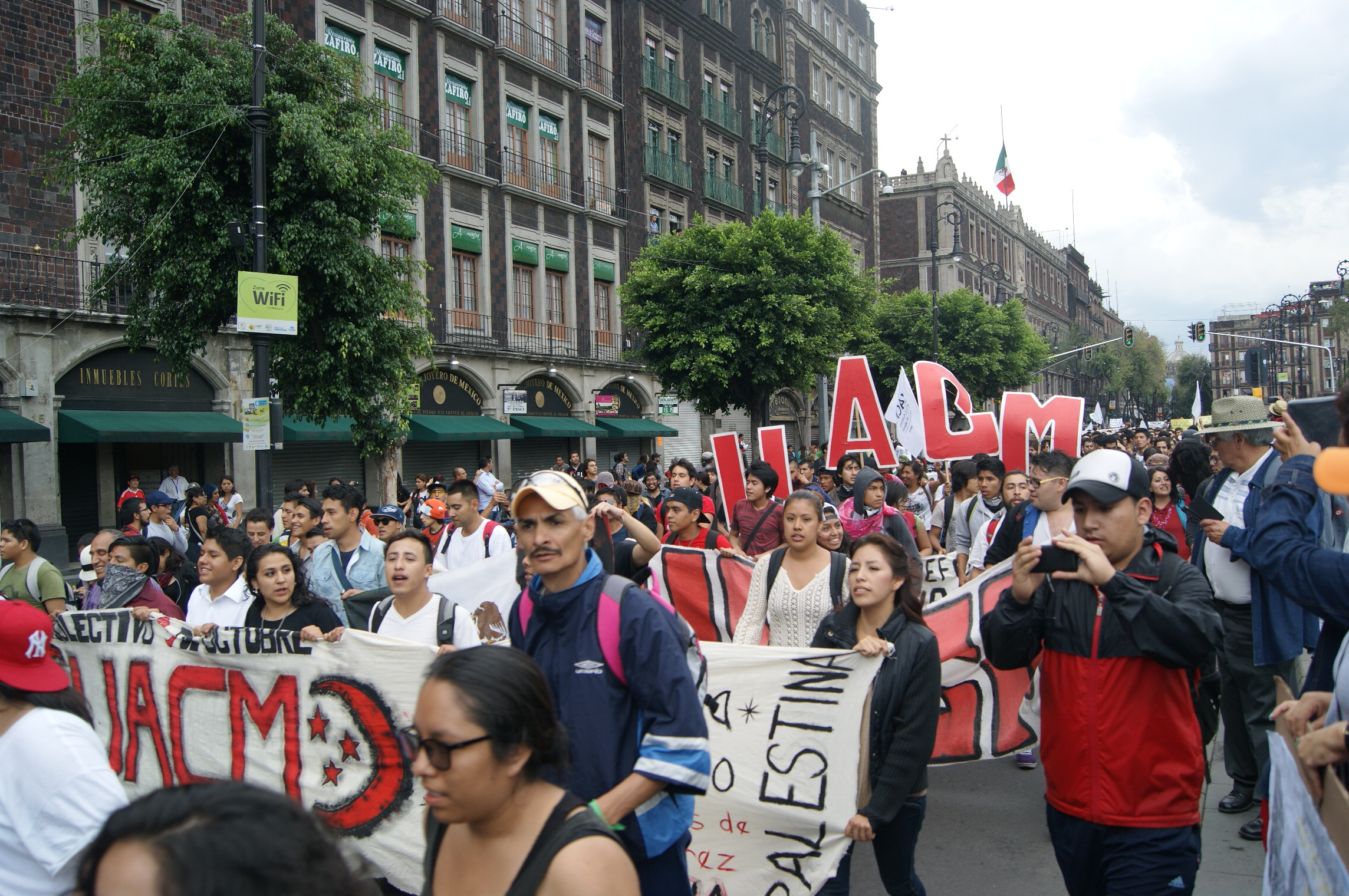
Demonstration marking the Tlatelolco massacre, October 2, 2014

In 1993, in remembrance of the 25th anniversary of the events, a stele was dedicated with the names of a few of the students and people who lost their lives during the event. The Supreme Court of Justice of the Nation has a mural commemorating the massacre.

During June 2006, days before the controversial presidential election of 2006, 84-year-old Echeverría was charged with genocide in connection with the massacre. He was placed under house arrest pending trial. In early July of that year (after the presidential elections), he was cleared of genocide charges, as the judge found that Echeverría could not be put on trial because the statute of limitations had expired.

In December 2008 the Mexican Senate named October 2 starting in 2009 as a National Day of Mourning; the initiative had already passed the Deputies' Chamber of Congress.

Alejandro Encinas, undersecretary of Human Rights, Population, and Migration, said on October 2, 2020, that the federal government would remove the names of "repressors" involved in the 1968 student movement and El Halconazo of 1971 from public places. He specifically proposed that the Licenciado Gustavo Díaz Ordaz International Airport in Puerto Vallarta should be renamed. He also promised that 8,000 boxes of archives, including those in possession of the military, would be digitalized and made public.

On October 2, 2024, President Claudia Sheinbaum, whose mother was dismissed from her job as a professor for denouncing the massacre, issued an official apology for the incident.

=== 40th anniversary march ===
On October 2, 2008, two marches were held in Mexico City to commemorate the event. One traveled from Escuela Normal Superior de Maestros (Teacher's College) to the Zocalo. The other went from the Instituto Politécnico Nacional to the massacre site of the Plaza de las Tres Culturas. According to the "Comité del 68" (68 Committee), one of the organizers of the event, 40,000 marchers were in attendance.

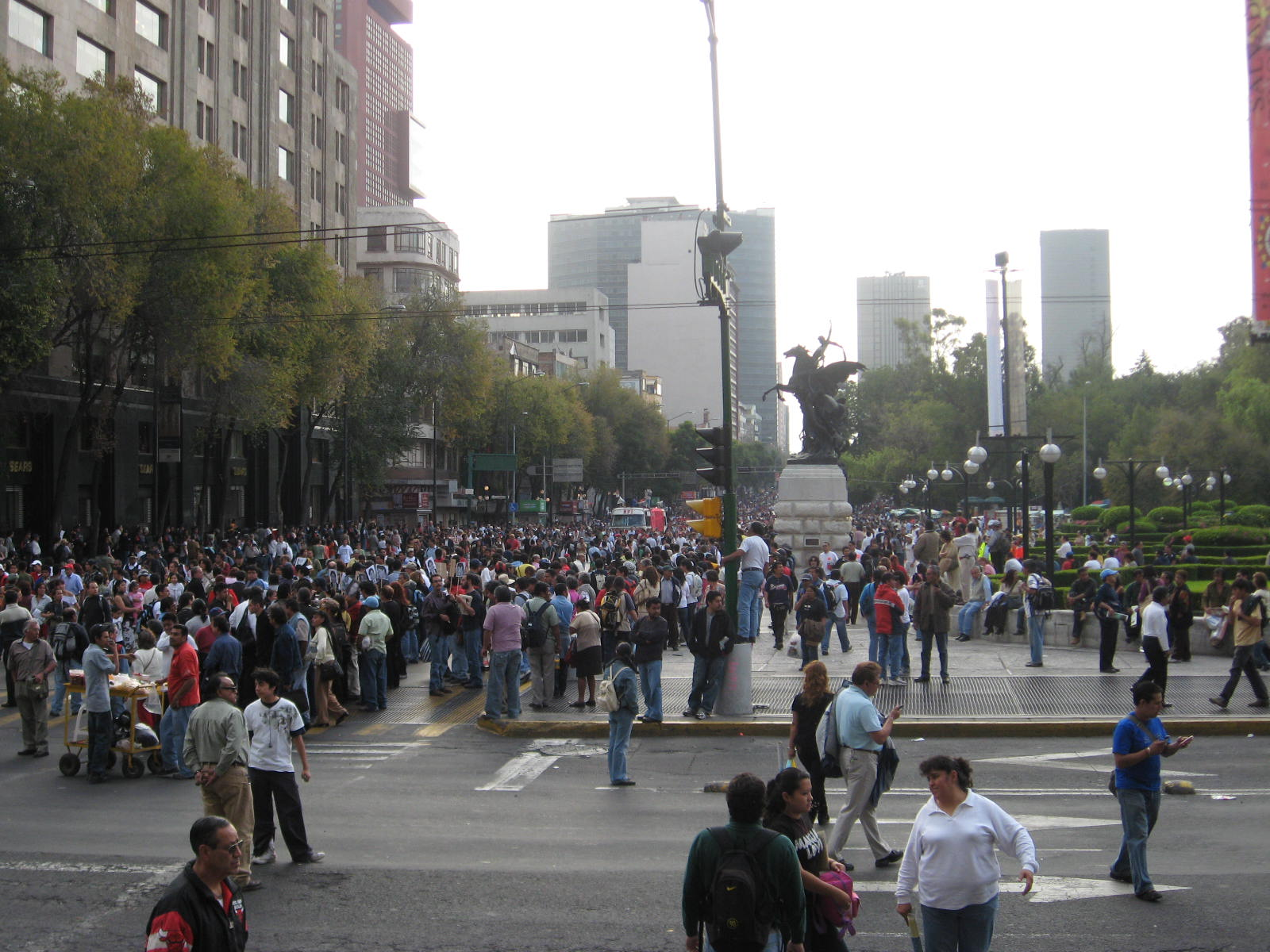
Head of march from the teachers' college to the Zocalo

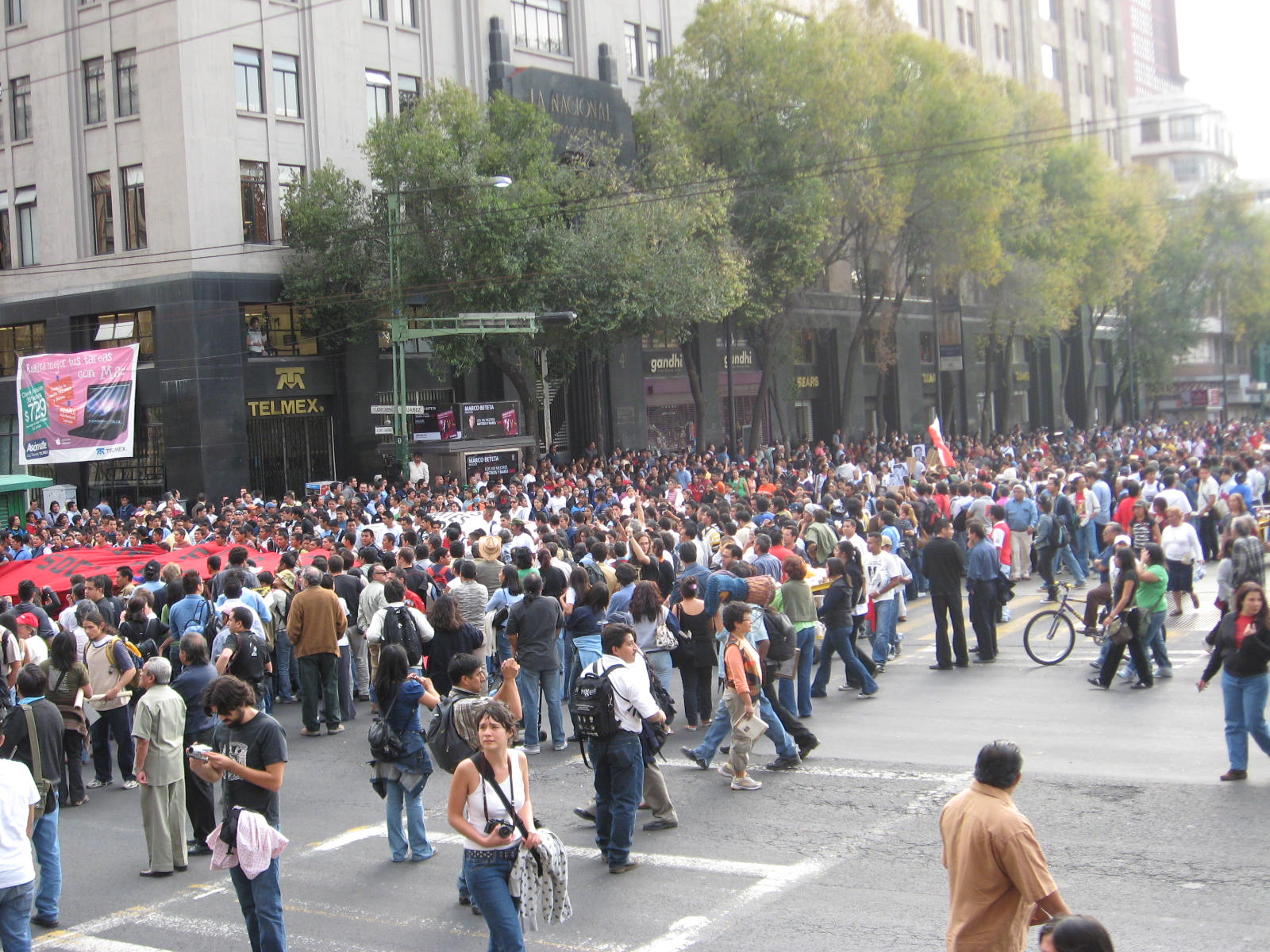
Part of the march to the Zocalo

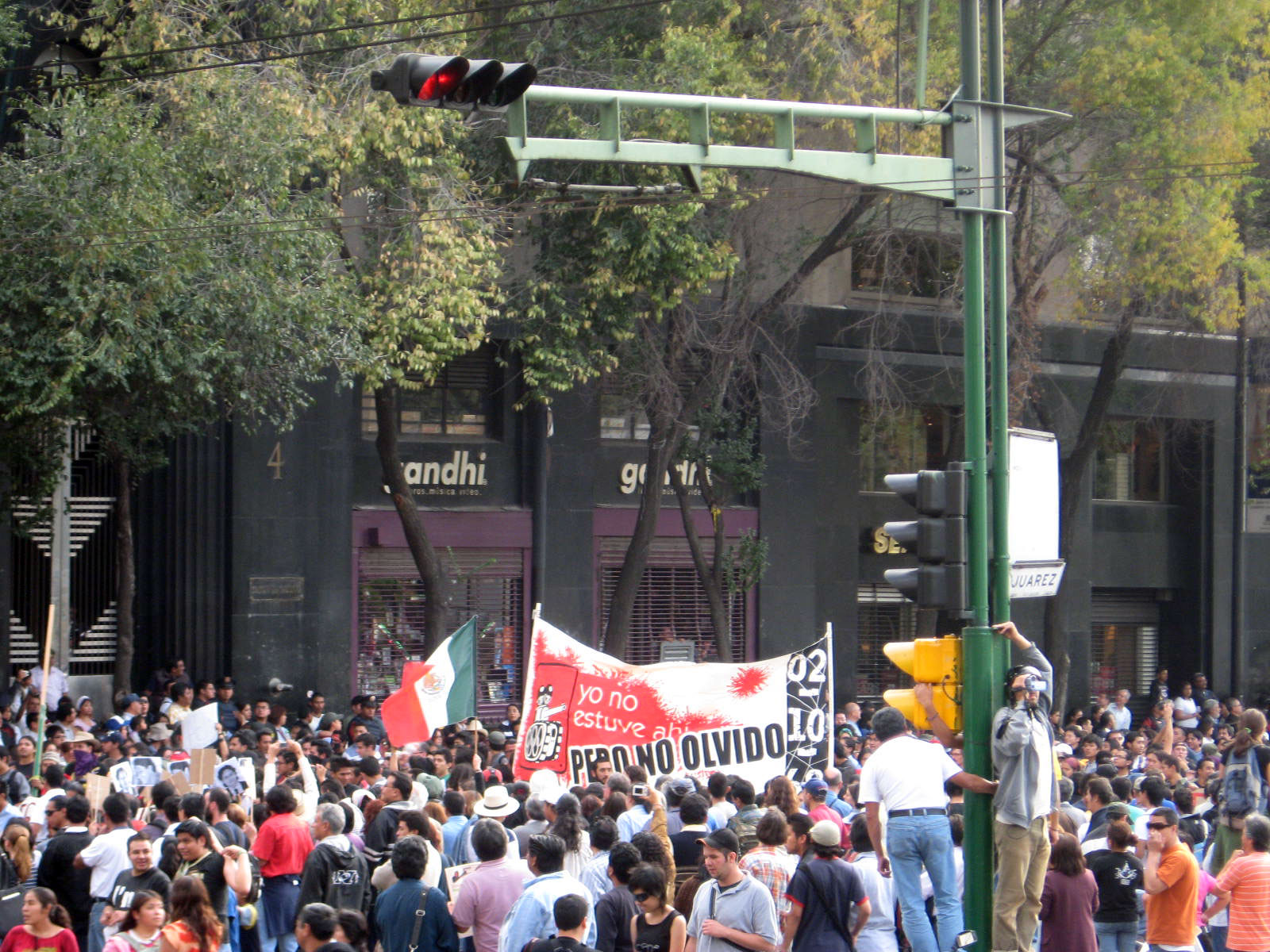
Sign states "No estuve ahí pero no olvido" (I wasn't there but I do not forget)

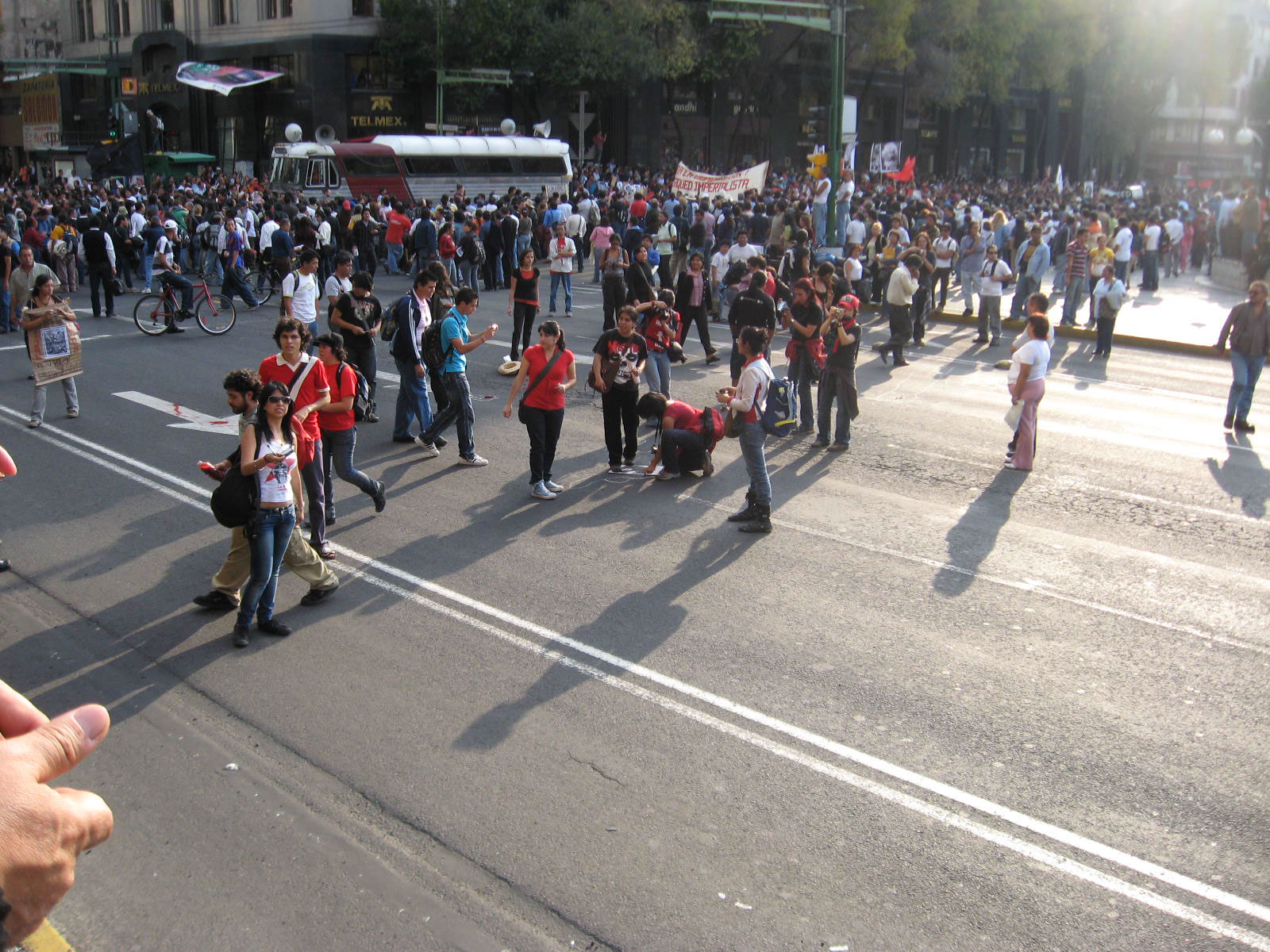
Protesters drawing chalk outlines of human bodies and doves with fake blood on Eje Central

=== Media portrayals ===
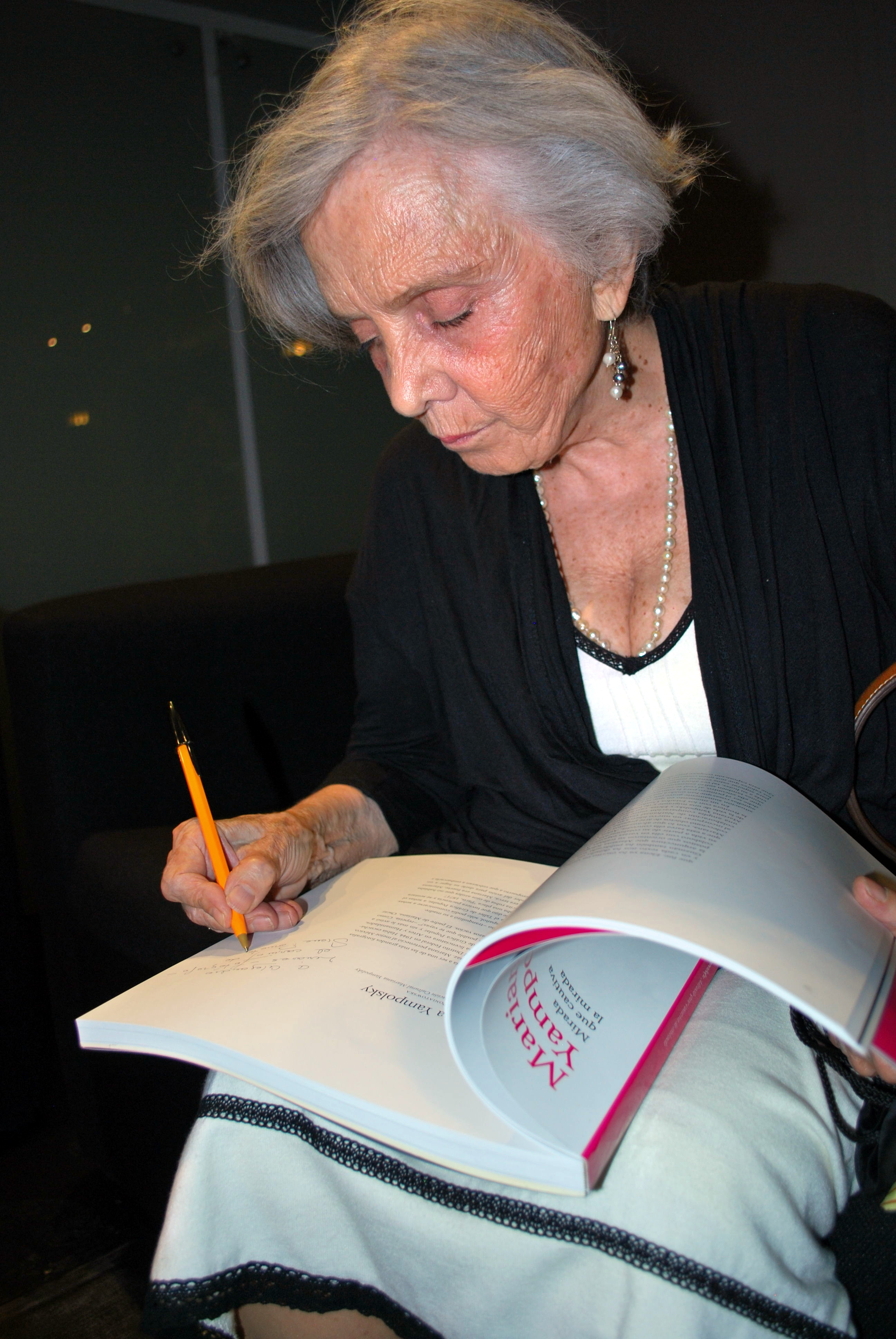
Elena Poniatowska's best known work is La noche de Tlatelolco (The night of Tlatelolco, the English translation was entitled "Massacre in Mexico").

In 1969, Mexican rock band Pop Music Team, launched the single "Tlatelolco" but was heavily censored by the government after a few days of airplay.

Rojo Amanecer (1989), directed by Jorge Fons, is a Spanish-language film about the event. It focuses on the day of a middle-class family living in one of the apartment buildings surrounding the Plaza de Tlatelolco and is based on testimonials from witnesses and victims. It starred Héctor Bonilla, María Rojo, the Bichir Brothers, Eduardo Palomo and others.

Alejandro Jodorowsky depicted a fictionalized version of the massacre in The Holy Mountain (1973), with birds, fruits, vegetables, liquids and other objects falling and being ripped out of the wounds of the dying students.

A feature film about the massacre, Tlatelolco, verano del '68, was released in Mexico, November 2012, written and directed by Carlos Bolado.

Roberto Bolaño released Amulet, a Spanish-language novel, in 1999, recounting the massacre from the point of view of a woman named Auxilio, based on the true story of Alcira Soust Scaffo. Auxilio was caught in the university bathroom at the time of the police ambush. She tells her story also in his later novel The Savage Detectives.

Borrar de la Memoria, a movie about a journalist who investigates a girl who was killed in July 1968, lightly touches the massacre, which is filmed by Roberto Rentería, a C.U.E.C. student who was making a documentary about said girl, known popularly as La empaquetada ("the packaged [girl]") for the way her dismembered body was found inside a box.

Los Parecidos, a 2015 film, also takes place at the date, references Tlatelolco heavily and portrays the conflict between students and the government.

"Jarhdin", a song by Mexican artist Maya Ghazal, features a two-minute audio sample recorded during the shooting at the Plaza de las Tres Culturas.

In season 1 episode 2 of Netflix TV series Narcos, it briefly explains the role of the Mexican Government FDS and short video of the Mexican Army storming the Plaza de las Tres Culturas.

The 2018 TV series An Unknown Enemy focuses on the same subject, from the perspective of an Intelligence agency.

The events of the season 2 episode "Who Are You" of the Star Wars television series Andor, particularly the in-universe Ghorman Massacre, may have been inspired by the Tlatelolco massacre.

=== Documentaries ===
Footage of the massacre is included in the documentary film El grito directed by student filmmaker Leobardo López Aretche, which also captures the events leading up to the massacre as the student movement grew in support.

Richard Dindo, a documentary filmmaker, directed Ni olvido, ni perdón (2004), which includes contemporary interviews with witnesses and participants as well as footage from the time.

Episodes 1 and 2 of the Netflix documentary series Break It All feature the massacre and its impact on contemporary Latin American rock and roll.

== Tlatelolco in the arts ==
The 1968 massacre has been referenced in the arts and pop culture in various ways. For example, in literary works such as "La Noche de Tlatelolco" (1971) by Elena Poniatowska which collected interviews, chants, slogans, and banners from student movement survivors. Tlatelolco movement veterans like Carlos Monsiváis, José Emilio Pacheco, Octavio Paz, and Jaime Sabines have written poems on the massacre and films like Jorge Fons's Rojo Amanecer (1990) have kept the memory alive. American composer John Adams set Rosario Castellanos' poem on the massacre at Tlatelolco in his oratorio El Niño (2000). Tlatelolco has marked the history of massacres and national injustice in Mexico in other historical ways which have permeated the arts such as it being a place of Aztec sacrificial performances, being the place where the Aztecs surrendered to the Spanish, and giving way to legitimizing the genocide of indigenous people in Mexico.

== International Reactions ==
In October 2003, the magazine Proceso discovered in recently opened government archives a telegram about the massacre in which the Argentine writers Jorge Luis Borges and Adolfo Bioy Casares expressed their support for the Mexican government.

== See also ==
- 1971 Corpus Christi massacre
- 1970 Polish protests
- Tiananmen massacre
- Kent State shootings
- Banana Massacre
- List of massacres in Mexico
