= La Onda =

Multidisciplinary artistic movement created in Mexico

La Onda (The Wave) was a multidisciplinary artistic movement created in Mexico by artists and intellectuals as part of the worldwide waves of the counterculture of the 1960s and the avant-garde. Pejoratively called as Literatura de la Onda by Margo Glantz in the beginning, the movement quickly grew and included other art forms with its followers called "onderos", "macizos" or "jipitecas". La Onda encompassed artistic productions in the worlds of cinema, literature, visual arts and music and strongly addressed social issues of the time, such as women's rights, ecology, spirituality, artistic freedom, open drug use and democracy in a country tightly ruled by the PRI. According to Mexican intellectual Carlos Monsiváis, La Onda was "a new spirit, the repudiation of convention and prejudice, the creation of a new morality, the challenging of proper morals, the expansion of consciousness, the systematic revision and critique of the values offered by the West as sacred and perfect."

== La Onda in music ==
La Onda originated with the introduction of U.S. and British rock and roll into Mexican music culture. Throughout the world, rock and roll was spreading and taking root as "a wedge and a mirror for societies caught in the throes of rapid modernization". Eric Zolov, author of Refried Elvis: The Rise of the Mexican Counterculture argues that "rock was a wedge in the sense that it challenged traditional boundaries of propriety, gender relations, social hierarchies, and the very meaning of national identity" which the Mexican PRI (or the Institutional Revolutionary Party) was struggling to define.

By the late 1950s, "youth from the middle classes began to form their bands…practicing as best they could versions of hit songs in English by their favorite foreign rock'n'rollers". The youth of Mexico began to identify with the youth of the United States and the United Kingdom, and it was only a matter of time before they were also inspired by the social activism of other modernizing countries.

After the 1968 Mexican student movements ended in the Tlatelolco massacre in Mexico City, a native hippie movement known as jipitecas grew in its wake and expanded to the entire country as well as parts of the US and Central America. By 1969, a new wave of Mexican rock music began to emerge, fusing Mexican and foreign music with images of political protest. This movement was called La Onda Chicana, culminating in a two-day "Mexican Woodstock" known as (Avándaro), which attracted ca. 300,000 people in September 1971.

== La Onda in literature ==
Starting in 1965, La Onda made its mark on the "new Central-American novel" and other genres. The wave of popular Mexican novels in the 1960s, "emphasized the sentiments of the new urban middle-class adolescent and the influence of United States culture, rock music, the generation gap, and the hippie movement." La Onda influenced many Mexican authors and intellectuals, like José Agustín, liberal priest Enrique Marroquin, ecologist Carlos Baca and Parménides Garcia Saldaña.

Alberto Blanco and Gustavo Sainz became icons of the movement; some writers who were not part of the movement but sympathised with it were Elena Poniatowska, Gabriela Brimmer, Jose Emilio Pacheco and Octavio Paz.

== La Onda in the cinema and theater ==
La Onda had icons like Alejandro Jodorowski, the Gurrola bros. And Sergio García, making the Super 8 film synonymous with counterculture. Iconic films which gained worldwide attention varied from the women's liberation-oriented ones like José Agustín's "5 de chocolate y 1 de fresa" to Jodorowski's psychedelic avant-garde masterpiece El Topo.

== La Onda in drug use and spirituality ==
In the realm of hallucinogenic drugs, La Onda's icon was shaman María Sabina.

== Society from the Mexican Revolution to the 1970s ==
Mexican society had undergone a tremendous change after the Mexican Revolution; a period of modernization pushed by the ruling Partido Revolucionario Institucional (PRI). Mexican society had a great deal to do with the growth and popularity of the Mexican counterculture. "The country’s transformation from predominantly rural to urban, the expansion of national industries, the emergence of a mixed economy with a high profile, and the expansion of educational institutions all fostered the impression that Mexico had finally emerged from the blight of underdevelopment and was on the road to peace and prosperity". The PRI wanted Mexico to become an evolved and prosperous country, like the United States.

As Mexican society grew more and more inspired by and connected to other foreign countries, the cultural dos and don’ts became more similar to those of other countries, especially those of the United States. As rock and roll music and American television, and movies arrived in Mexico, the youth changed and slowly evolved into a rebellious stage inspired by the youth rebellion of the United States. One of the major ways in which the youth of Mexico began to rebel was by listening to and performing rock and roll. At first, they would perform famous songs in English from famous English-speaking rock and rollers like Elvis Presley, the Beatles, and the Rolling Stones. The Mexican government saw a chance to reach Mexican youth by supporting rock and roll music and helping Mexican musicians play rock and roll music. The government hoped to change the meaning of the music. Instead of rebellion, the music would inspire support for the Mexican government and promote becoming upstanding citizens. But "government efforts to blockade the arrival of foreign music indirectly contributed to the emergence of a native rock’n’roll product, and more and more rock and roll bands began to emerge.

Rock and roll represented a connection between the youth of Mexico and the trend-setting youth of America. Both countries had modernized rapidly after World War II, and an effect of this modernization was a desire for a unifying identity that separated from that of past generations with a Revolutionary identity, and especially from that of their parents and grandparents who fought for and brought about the Mexican Revolution. The harder the PRI tried to control the identity of Mexico’s citizens, the more the youth of Mexico felt it necessary to fight back.

Mexican rock and roll bands needed a place to perform their music that was accessible to everyone. They began performing in places like Cafe Cantante, a rock club that allowed everyone to access the counterculture. The youth of Mexico identified with the youth of the United States, but unfortunately, were only able to witness a small part of the American counterculture, and that in other countries, so they had to interpret and express what they saw through their music. Besides television, film, and literature, the youth of Mexico only had one true way to experience the counterculture in a unified way, and that was through music. The Cafe Cantantes "thus served as a kind of transcultural performance space where the styles, gestures, and sounds of the youth culture from abroad were transposed for a Mexican audience". The Mexican government felt a need to shut down the clubs because they "fomented [ed] rebellion without a cause' leading to increases in juvenile delinquency. As the cafes were raided and shut down, the counterculture of the 1960s grew and was inspired to question and challenge authority.

The counterculture was no longer just about rock and roll. Now, in the early 1960s, youth were also adopting foreign fashion and attitudes towards authority, and rock music was again becoming a wedge against traditional social values and a vehicle for free expression". The Mexican government was very focused on projecting cultural unity, and the youth of Mexico felt it was important to express themselves and their feelings about this rigid modernization and unification through their music and clothing.

As the decade went by, hippies, or jipitecas, emerged among the youth of Mexico. Politically conscious students began to openly defy societal norms, like the hippies did in the United States. They needed to break the bonds of society and find new ways to express themselves. Young men wanted to break out of the mold set by their fathers. So they had to look disheveled and wrinkled, because the older generation of men looked very manicured and put together, and dressed much more conservatively. Girls had a similar problem, but also had to fight for a new freedom, where they had the same rights and opportunities as men. But both genders were beginning to fight for their rights to express themselves, be original, and be individual.

== Politics: Single-party government ==
After the Mexican Revolution, the Mexican government worked for a time to legitimize the acts of the new Constitution and to settle the country into stabilized governance. For a time, Mexico boasted "high levels of popular participation, featured a wide array of opposing political parties, and observed peaceful transfers of power from one administration to the next". But an authoritarian government eventually emerged. "The combination of favorable international circumstances and internal conditions enabled the governing party to become a monopoly party of government during the three decades after 1940". Presidents like Álvaro Obregón, Plutarco Elías Calles, and Lázaro Cárdenas wanted to perpetuate the teachings of the Revolution and solidify revolutionary ideals into Mexican society. But after the Mexican Revolution, the government not only wanted to solidify the Revolution's ideals, it also wanted to improve the government and elevate the status of Mexico to a modern, First World power. In the 1940s, they began "to industrialize the country, using an import-substitution policy...displacing the traditional center of gravity, which had been the countryside, to the cities". This shift, and their focus on the middle-class family, eventually led to the first phase of La Onda, in which the children and grandchildren of the Revolutionaries began to challenge authority and individualizing and express themselves through rock and roll music and foreign fashion trends.

By the 1960s, the import-substitution model was no longer working. The enthusiasm with which the Mexican government had fostered towards economic growth and political stability was slowly stifling the Mexican people. In the 1950s, Northern Mexico witnessed "a vigorous mobilization of peasant groups that invaded lands under the direction of organizations with relatively radical ideologies, outside the official structures". By the late 1960s, "the monopoly party had deepened its control over the political processes and took credit for the economic expansion that resulted". Now, it was not only Mexico's middle-class youth who were rebelling against the authoritarian government. The working class was rebelling also, against the old industrial institutions and fighting for better pay and protection from the companies and the government.

== Economics: A widening gap between the middle and lower classes ==
Mexico's economy expanded substantially after World War II. As it expanded, the country became prosperous, and the population became more middle class. More and more factories were built, bolstering the economy, but resulting in lower pay for workers, the people who kept the economy afloat. Mexican politics and economy went hand in hand when "political stability [under Ávila Camacho] encouraged enough foreign capital back into the country to bolster high rates of growth". Mexico's "emphasis on economic development...has focused on those activities, industry and commerce that are most efficiently undertaken in urban areas, where there is an adequate supply of labor, credit, transportation, and communication". This emphasis on urbanization eventually led to the worker and student movement of the 1960s.

As 1968 approached, the president of Mexico gained more and more absolute and monopolizing power. President Gustavo Díaz Ordaz displayed the terrible effects of absolute government on the people of Mexico; "the issue of accountability, along with other constitutional questions such as the relationship of the powers and the effective participation of civil society in the political processes, fell by the wayside". The monopoly of the PRI, especially under Díaz Ordaz, had gone unchallenged before the 1968 student movement, but the growth of presidential power under Díaz was seen as blatantly abusive, inspiring students, peasants, and industrial workers to challenge his absolute authority.

In 1968, Mexico City hosted the 1968 Summer Olympics. The Mexican government had been dealing with the effects of La Onda as minor social rebellions inspired by the American counterculture movement. As passive and active resistance grew, the Mexican government saw a need to put down the opposition. Ordaz felt that the Olympics were Mexico's initiation into the First World community, and that a student movement just weeks before the Games would be disastrous for Mexico's image.

Mexico's economic situation improved in the 1950s with the Bracero Program, and with an "Export-Import Bank approved $150 million loan to finance transportation, agriculture, and power facilities". Between 1954 and 1971, the Mexican economy stabilized under President Adolfo Ruiz Cortines and Adolfo López Mateos. This stability lasted until 1971, when the Mexican economy began to decline. One of the major reasons for such a prosperous economy at this time was Mexico's decision to nationalize its oil production. This nationalization and Mexico's modernization program helped to stabilize the economy. Another factor was the Korean War, which "had increased world prices, provided opportunities for Mexican exports, and led to the inflow of foreign capital". But by the late 1960s, the Mexican economy was unable to finance itself, resulting in lower wages and worker discontent.

== Social protests ==
Before the Student Movement of 1968, there were other political movements. One such movement took place between 1964 and 1965. At that time, "Díaz Ordaz’s political miscalculations allowed a dispute over better pay and working conditions with hospital doctors working in the public sector to escalate into a strike movement". Although this strike did not have anything to do with La Onda, it did serve as an example for Mexico's youth in their fight against an authoritarian government.

Besides student movements, the government also responded severely to labor unions, usually with harsh repression. In the 1930s and 1940s, the PRI used police and military force to suppress labor protests. Later, in 1958–1959, the government responded to the railway workers’ dispute by arresting numerous workers and union supporters. In 1961, in Mexico City, students gathered to celebrate the newly instated Fidel Castro administration in Cuba, when the gathering was broken up by police using tear gas and rifle butts. This severe, single-minded way of dealing with social movements did not work to the Mexican government's advantage. After the 1968 Student Movement and resulting massacre, "an alliance of students, peasants, and urban workers in Oaxaca succeeded in forming a political movement independent of the PRI by 1972". Throughout the time of Mexico's economic stability under the PRI, there were many minor protests to question the moral credibility of the Mexican government.

== 1968 Student Movement and the Tlatelolco Massacre ==
For a long time, the Mexican government had been pushing the Mexican people into a unified structure, one where the youth of Mexico did not rebel, and the entire population worked together to recreate Mexico as a First World power. This forced and false unity inspired the Mexican counterculture. The youth of Mexico saw other countries protesting their false unification, and craved the individuality that those protestors had found. This challenge to authority manifested in the rock and roll music and clothing in the everyday lives of Mexico's adolescents. And just as the students in other countries peacefully protested conservative governments, the students of Mexico began to challenge authority in Mexico, too. Gilberto Guevara Niebla, a student leader, stated in an interview: "The Student Movement had many dimensions. On one hand, it was a student movement; on the other, it was not. The Student movement was the bearer of demands that were not only strictly student concerns but also those of society. Before 1968, the authoritarian state had brutally beaten workers, campesinos, and it had destroyed the leftist opposition parties. It was in this vacuum that students injected their demands, aspirations, and desires that were not exclusively of student interest, but also of interest to campesinos, workers, intellectuals, political parts, etc.".

The 1968 student movement was the "articulated restlessness and rage for much of the youth of a middle class which had come of age during Mexico’s acclaimed modernizing 'miracle' and which afterward opened the floodgates of cynicism and everyday resistance to a political system bent on maintaining control". According to Zolov, the student movement made only six demands, including "freedom of political prisoners, abolition of the riot police, the dismissal of the Mexico City chief of police, and justice against those responsible for repression". The 1968 student movement wasn't just students; peasants, businessmen and Mexico's working class also took part in the fight for democracy. In 1968, the student movement "challenged the legitimacy of the system and proved, by the bloody repression it suffered, that [the Mexican Government] had an authoritarian core". Protesters wanted a mass movement that would force the government to reform the official party and provide greater opportunity for political participation.

Economic growth after World War II and the stability that ensued led to overall declines in poverty and inequality, but the "opportunities created for the middle sectors did not match their expectations and instead created a large population of upwardly mobile young people whose dreams and aspirations" grew faster than the Mexican economy. The younger generation was still inspired by foreign protests against rigid government regimes. Through literature, music, and art, Mexico's youth connected and formed a larger group that included students, peasants and industrial workers. They began to challenge the status quo and question authority, seeking self-expression and equality for all. Across Mexico, more and more universities got involved, students began to meet and address issues and hold rallies protesting world events and injustice in Mexico. As more and more campuses joined in, the government became uncomfortable and paranoid about the effect the students would have on Mexico's reputation.

It began to monitor politically active students, but the more the government monitored students, the more they joined the cause. By late 1968, even some high schools and middle schools had joined the student movement. No longer was the younger generation fighting against conservative family values with rock and roll music, beatnik literature, and daring fashion. Now, the students were unifying and banding together in resentment of an authoritarian government.

Mexico had been selected to host the 1968 Olympic Games, and the PRI were on high alert for student protests. They were not tolerant. Students played a key role in the democratization of the Mexican government; as police abuse became more and more prevalent, students began to feel that political upheaval was needed. On July 29, 1968, "students barricaded themselves inside their high school to protest police abuse" then "infantry troops used a bazooka to blast" into the school and "proceeded to beat and ultimately arrest one thousand students". This and many other cases of police abuse triggered an ultimate student protest on October 2, 1968. Internally, the 1968 student movement was linked to "the growing criticism of the Mexican Revolution that was particularly evident in the labor struggles of the 1950s and 1960s". The political movements of other countries and their success in changing legislation inspired the revolutionary youth. The Mexican youth thought that if they peacefully banded together and showed their support for their cause, the PRI might heed their demands.

On July 26, 1968, demonstrators attempted to gather at the Zócalo, which was reserved for organized demonstrations of support for the president. As more and more people gathered, Díaz Ordaz "regarded the movement as an affront to the dignity of Mexico".). The PRI had no control over student demands for respect and constitutional rights. By August 13, 1968, "100,000 people were protesting against the regime’s disrespect for public liberties and the presence of tanks in the city streets". The government saw the growing political unrest as "a revolutionary conspiracy...designed to bring down the existing political order". People gathered on the evening of October 2, 1968, at the Plaza de las Tres Culturas (Plaza of Three Cultures). The administration did not attempt to establish dialogue. Troops and police opened fire on the Tlatelolco demonstrators and massacred them.

This massacre at Tlatelolco "which effectively terminated the protest movement". There was a call for a new counter-movement and new forms of opposition to the authoritarian government. Now, the student movement had turned into La Onda, a new movement focused solely on expressing a deep need for democracy in Mexico, as well as the need for self-expression.

The massacre "created a legitimacy" for democratization ‒ no longer could the Mexican government deny that Mexico had an authoritarian government. Not only did the massacre "reorganize civil society and catalyze electoral reforms", it also "spotlighted Mexican authoritarianism". After the Massacre at Tlatelolco, La Onda evolved again. First, it had been a protestation of conservative traditions legitimized during the Mexican Revolution. This youth movement questioned authority through the use of rock and roll music, beatnik literature, and daring fashion. Next came the Student Movements that challenged the authoritarian government and fought for the democratization of Mexico. After the Tlatelolco Massacre, a new wave of La Onda emerged ‒ that of the jipitecas, or hippies, who rebelled against the status quo and preached peace and democracy above a strict authoritarian government.

== Festival Rock y Ruedas de Avándaro ==
The Festival Rock y Ruedas in Avándaro, Mexico, took place September 11–12, 1971 in the hamlet of Tenantongo, near the Avandaro lake and golf club in Valle de Bravo, State of Mexico. The Rock y Ruedas (Rock and Wheels) festival had originally begun as "nothing more than a series of auto races". The organizers suggested that rock music should be included to have a Noche Mexicana the night before the event. As many bands were hired to participate, a rock festival was organized to promote the auto race ‒ but instead turned into a "Mexican Woodstock" with a huge number of Mexican rock bands such as Los Dug Dug's, El Epilogo, La Division Del Norte, Tequila, Peace and Love, El Ritual and so many more playing to a crowd of over 300,000 people for two days. This huge music spectacle culminated all the effort of La Onda, describing "a modern sense of movement and communication, as in radio or television 'wavelength'". The festival, which greatly resembled the Woodstock of the United States, was a culmination of the efforts of La Onda along with the efforts of the government to control political unrest and make the public feel as though their protests were heard. La Onda, which had started as a teenage rebellion against conservative parenting, had turned into a political movement fighting for democracy in an authoritarian government, and lastly returned to a musical demonstration, but instead of violently rebelling against authority, it taught passive resistance, peace, and unification.

== See also ==
- Tejano music
- Mexican rock music
- Latino punk
- Rock en tu idioma
- Rock en espanol
- Ritmo Peligroso
- Caifanes
- Ritchie Valens
- Azul Violeta
- Kenny y los Eléctricos
- Rostros Ocultos
- Los Saicos
- New York Dolls
