= Los Número Uno =

Los Número Uno: Éxitos 1968-2003

Compilation album by El Tri
- Released: March 4, 2003
- Genres: Rock, blues
- Length: 126:52
- Label: WEA
- Producer: Alex Lora

El Tri chronology
No Te Olvides de la Banda (2002)	Los Número Uno: Éxitos 1968-2003 (2003)	Alex Lora: Esclavo del Rocanrol (2003)

Los Número Uno: Éxitos 1968-2003 (The Number Ones 1968-2003) (2003) is the twentieth album and second compilation album by Mexican rock and blues band El Tri. Going back to the end of the Sixties when the band was only a trio known as Three Souls in my Mind the compilation take a couple of songs 30 years old as well as hits up to the latest albums.

Raoul Hernandez of the The Austin Chronicle wrote that the album "unearths a familiar 35-year arc, stripped-down Sixties freneticism muscling into hard body rock evoking everyone from the Stones and Springsteen to ZZ Top."

== Track listing ==
All tracks by Alex Lora except where noted.

=== Disc one ===
1. "A.D.O. (En Vivo)" (A.D.O. (Live)) – 6:34 (Es lo Mejor, 1974)
2. "Nuestros Impuestos" (Our Taxes) – 2:30 (Es lo Mejor, 1974)
3. "Abuso de Autoridad" (Authority Abuse) – 2:01 (Chavo de Onda, 1973)
4. "Oye Cantinero" (Hey, Bartender) – 2:39 (Three Souls in My Mind III, 1972)
5. "Perro Negro y Callejero" (Black And Stray Dog) – 3:05 (Chavo de Onda, 1973)
6. "Triste Canción" (Sad Song) – 5:42 (Simplemente, 1984)
7. "Metro Balderas" (Rodrigo González) (Balderas Subway) – 5:42 (Simplemente, 1984)
8. "Que Viva el Rock and Roll" – 2:44 (Three Souls in My Mind III, 1972)
9. "El Blues de la Llanta" (Lora, Sergio Mancera) (The Tire Blues) – 7:33 (Qué Rico Diablo, 1977)
10. "San Juanico" – 5:25 (Simplemente, 1984)
11. "El Niño Sin Amor" (The Child Without Love) – 3:07 (El Niño Sin Amor, 1986)
12. "Mente Rockera" (Rocking Mind) – 4:18 (La Devaluación, 1975)
13. "Difícil" (Lora, Horacio Reni) (Difficult) – 2:46 (21 Años Después, Alex Lora y El Tri, 1989)
14. "Maria Sabina" – 5:13 (21 Años Después, Alex Lora y El Tri, 1989)
15. "Let Me Swim" – 3:50 (Ernesto De León, Lora) Three Souls in My Mind, 1970

=== Disc two ===
1. "Millones de Niños" (Millions Of Children) – 8:08 (Una Leyenda Viva Llamada El Tri, 1990)
2. "Pobre Soñador" (Lora, Felipe Souza) (Poor Dreamer) – 3:51 (25 Años, 1993)
3. "Los Minusválidos" (Chicho Mora, Lora, Martinez, Rafael Salgado, Ruben Soriano, Souza) (The Handicapped) – 3:16 (Una Rola Para los Minusvalidos, 1994)
4. "Las Piedras Rodantes" (The Rolling Stones) – 3:19 (Una Rola Para los Minusvalidos, 1994)
5. "Todo Sea Por el Rocanrol" (All For Rock `n Roll) – 4:45 Hoyos en la Bolsa, 1996
6. "Virgen Morena" (Brown-Skinned Virgin) – 4:33 (Cuando Tú No Estás, 1997)
7. "Parece Fácil" (It Looks Easy) – 4:35 (Cuando Tú No Estás, 1997)
8. "El Muchacho Chicho" The Neat Guy – 5:10 (Cuando Tú No Estás, 1997)
9. "Todo Me Sale Mal" (Everything I Do Go Wrong) – 3:44 (Fin de Siglo, 1998)
10. "Vicioso" (Lora, Mancera) (Vicious) – 2:26 (Simplemente, 1984)
11. "Madre Tierra" (Mother Earth) – 3:46 (No Podemos Volar, 2000)
12. "Esclavo del Rocanrol" (Slave of Rock`n Roll) – 3:13 (Cuando Tú No Estás, 1997)
13. "No Te Olvides de la Banda" (Don't Forget About the Band) – 4:33 (No Te Olvides de la Banda, 2002)
14. "Chilango Incomprendido" (Misunderstood Chilango) – 2:57 (25 Años, 1993)
15. "Nostalgia" – 5:27 (Fin de Siglo, 1998)
- _{Album and year of original release inside parenthesis}

== Personnel ==
- Alex Lora – guitar, bass, vocals, producer, mixing, compilation
- Rafael Salgado – harmonic
- Eduardo Chico – guitar
- Oscar Zarate – guitar
- Chela Lora – backing vocals, art direction, compilation
- Ramon Perez – drums
- Pedro Martinez – drums
- Ruben Soriano – bass
- Mariano Soto – drums
- Felipe Souza – guitar
- Sergio Mancera – guitar
- Tulio Bagnara – general coordination
- Luis Gil – remastering
- Hula – design
