= Alex Lora: 35 Años y lo Que le Falta Todavía =

Live album by El Tri
- Released: March 2, 2004
- Recorded: October 12–13, 2003
- Genres: Rock, Blues
- Length: 145:07
- Label: WEA
- Producer: Alex Lora

El Tri chronology
Alex Lora: Esclavo del Rocanrol (2003)	Alex Lora: 35 Años y lo Que le Falta Todavía (2004)	MTV Unplugged (2004)

Alex Lora: 35 Años y lo Que le Falta Todavía (Alex Lora: 35 Years and What Is Left to Come) is the twenty-second album and fifth live album by Mexican rock and blues band El Tri. It was released in 2004.

This was the last album by the band to be released by WEA before the front man of the band Alex Lora funded his own Record label named Lora Records.

It was nominated for Best Rock Album by a Duo/Group with Vocals at the 5th Annual Latin Grammy Awards.

== Track listing ==
All tracks by Alex Lora except where noted.

=== Disc one ===
1. "Intro/De la Raza Pa' la Banda" (From the People to the Band) – 11:06 (_{No Te Olvides de la Banda, 2002})
2. "Ya No le Metas" (Give the Thing a Rest) – 3:17 (_{Lora, Su Lira y Sus Rolas, 1999})
3. "Chilango Incomprendido" (Misunderstood Chilango) – 4:09 (_{25 Años, 1993})
4. "Las Mujeres de Juárez" (The Women of Juarez) (Lora, Rafael Salgado) – 6:18
5. "El as No Conocido" (The Unknown Ace) (Lora Sergio Mancera) – 2:44 (_{21 Años Después, Alex Lora y El Tri, 1989})
6. "Seria Horrible" (It Would Be Horrible) – 2:55
7. "Tu Sonrisa" (Your Smile) – 4:39 (_{No Te Olvides de la Banda, 2002})
8. "Tren del Infierno" (Hell's Train) – 4:58 (_{21 Años Después, Alex Lora y El Tri, 1989})
9. "Quién da un Peso Por Mis Sueños" (Who Gives a Dime for My Dreams) (Armando Manzanero) – 3:19 (_{Fin de Siglo, 1998})
10. "Solamente Dios" (Only God) – 5:50 (_{No Te Olvides de la Banda, 2002})
11. "Pamela" (Lora, Oscar Zarate) – 5:51 (_{Hoyos en la Bolsa, 1996})
12. "Es lo Mejor" (It's the Best) – 4:15 (_{Es lo Mejor, 1974})
13. "El Rey" (The King) – 5:25 (_{25 Años, 1993})
14. "Las Víctimas Invisibles de Nueva York" (The Invisible Victims of New York) (Lora, Chela Lora) – 3:48
15. "Todo Me Sale Mal" (Everything I Do Comes Out Wrong) – 4:48 (_{Fin de Siglo, 1998})

=== Disc two ===
1. "Ahi Pa' la Otra"(Next Time) – 6:06
2. "Esclavo del Rocanrol" (Slave of Rock 'n Roll) (Rodrigo Levario, Lora) – 3:30 (_{Cuando Tú No Estás, 1997})
3. "El Mamey y el Nero" (Lora, Horacio Reni) – 4:25 (_{Lora, Su Lira y Sus Rolas, 1999})
4. "San Juanico '84" (Lora, Mancera) – 6:50 (_{Simplemente, 1984})
5. "Juanita" (Lora, Mancera, Mariano Soto) – 4:55 (_{Simplemente, 1984})
6. "Pobres de los Niños" (Poor Kids) – 5:17 (_{Bellas de Noche, 1979})
7. "La Raza Más Chida" (Lora, Pedro Martinez) (The Coolest Race) – 5:57 (_{Una Rola Para los Minusvalidos, 1994})
8. "Triste Canción" (Sad Song) – 10:29 (_{Simplemente, 1984})
9. "Virgen Morena" (Brown-Skinned Virgin) – (_{Cuando Tú No Estás, 1997})
10. "Todo Es Materia" (Everything Is Matter) – 4:57 (_{Una Rola Para los Minusvalidos, 1994})
11. "Las Piedras Rodantes" (The Rolling Stones) – 10:41 (_{Una Rola Para los Minusvalidos, 1994})
- _{Album and year of original release inside parenthesis}

== Personnel ==
- Alex Lora – guitar, bass, vocals, producer, mixing
- Rafael Salgado – harmonic
- Eduardo Chico – guitar
- Oscar Zarate – guitar
- Chela Lora – backing vocals
- Ramon Perez – drums

=== Guest musicians ===
- Lalo Toral – keyboards, Pipe organ in "Virgen Morena".
- Zbigniew Paleta – violin in "Triste Canción"
- Sergio Mancera "El Cóndor" – guitar in "San Juanico ('84)", "Juanita", and "Pobres de los niños".
- Mariano Soto – drums in "San Juanico ('84)", "Juanita", "Pobres de los niños" and "Triste Canción".
- Arturo Labastida "El Papaito" – sax in "San Juanico", "Juanita", "Pobre de los niños", and "Triste Canción".
- "La Tribu" ethnic group – "Intro/De la Raza pa' la banda" and "La Raza Más Chida".
- "Las Piedras Rodantes" string group in "Solamente Dios" and "Pamela".
- "Zanate y Asociados" coral group in "Virgen Morena" and "Todo es Materia".
- Armando Manzanero – vocals in "Quien Da un Peso Por Mis Sueños".
- Johnny Laboriel – vocals in "Seria Horrible".
- Kenny Avilés – vocals in "El Rey".
- Rod Levario – guitar in "Esclavo del Rocanrol".
- Horacio Reni – vocals, guitar, harmonic in "El Mamey y El Ñero".

=== Technical ===
- Fernando Aceves – photography
- Angel Aguirre – artwork
- David Bojorges – editing
- Craig Brock – engineer
- Marco Cataño – A&R
- Joaquin Perez Fernandez – A&R
- Eduardo Gomez – engineer
- Fernando Roldán – mastering Engineer
- Jean B. Smith – engineer
