= Un Cuarto de Siglo =

Live album by El Tri
- Released: February 19, 1995
- Genres: Rock, Blues
- Length: 128:20
- Label: WEA
- Producer: Alex Lora

El Tri chronology
Una Rola Para los Minusvalidos (1994)	Un Cuarto de Siglo (1995)	Hoyos en la Bolsa (1996)

Un Cuarto de Siglo (A Quarter of Century) (1995) is the twelfth album and third live album by Mexican rock and blues band El Tri.

It records a concert held on 12 October 1993 in Mexico City for the 25th anniversary of the bound's formation under their original name "Three Souls in My Mind". In the booklet Alex Lora thanks its followers as follows:

Thanks to all the people who had supported us all this years and followed without prejudice our concerts, thanks for passing to your sons, as inheritance, the joy for our music

== Track listing ==
_{All tracks by Alex Lora except where otherwise noted.}

=== CD 1 ===
1. "Oye" (_{Listen}) – 2:43 (Es lo Mejor, 1974)
2. "Inyecciones" (_{Injections}) – 3:14 (Three Souls in My Mind III, 1972)
3. "San Juanico" – 6:24 (Simplemente, 1984)
4. "Vicioso" (_{Vicious}) (Lora, Sergio Mancera) – 3:06 (Simplemente, 1984)
5. "Difícil" (_{Difficult}) (Lora, Horacio Reni) – 2:51 (21 Años Después, Alex Lora y El Tri, 1989)
6. "No Puedo Dejar de Chupar" (_{I can't quit drinking}) – 3:01 (El Blues del Eje Vial, 1978)
7. "Santa Martha" (Three Souls In miy Mind III, 1972) – 4:28
8. "Chilango Incomprendido" (_{Misunderstood Chilango}) – 2:59 (25 Años, 1993)
9. "El Hablador" (_{The Bragger}) (García, Lora) – 3:54 (25 Años, 1993)
10. "Tómate la Foto" (_{Take The Picture}) (Lora, Felipe Souza) – 3:49 (25 Años, 1993)
11. "Que Viva el Rocanrol" – 4:30 (Three Souls in My Mind III, 1972)
12. "Igual Pa' Todos" (_{Same For Everyone}) – 5:01 (Indocumentado, 1992)
13. "El Semental" (_{The Stud}) – 3:00 (Es lo Mejor, 1974)
14. "El Boogie del Tri" (_{El Tri Boogie}) – 6:15
15. "La Encuerada de Avándaro" (_{The Naked Woman of Avandaro}) – 2:59 (Three Souls in My Mind III, 1972)
16. "Viejas de Vecindad" (_{Neighborhood's old hags}) – 5:00 (Una Leyenda Viva Llamada El Tri, 1990)

=== CD 2 ===
1. "Sara" (Eduardo Chico, Lora) – 4:26 (Otra Tocada Mas, 1988)
2. "Tirando a Matar" (_{Shoot To Kill}) – 4:02 (Indocumentado, 1992)
3. "El Niño Sin Amor" (_{Chile Without Love}) – 6:03 (El Niño Sin Amor, 1986)
4. "Es lo Mejor" (_{It's The Best}) – 4:00 (Es lo Mejor, 1974)
5. "Presta" (_{Lend}) – 3:50 (Qué Rico Diablo, 1977)
6. "Indocumentado" (_{Undocumented}) – 4:44 (Indocumentado, 1992)
7. "FZ. 10" (Cruz, Lora) – 3:48 (Hecho en México, 1985)
8. "Abuso de Autoridad" (_{Abuse of Power}) – 2:21 (Chavo de Onda, 1973)
9. "Pobre Soñador" (_{Poor Dreamer}) (Lora, Souza) – 4:22 (25 Años, 1993)
10. "Ya Me Voy" (_{I'm Leaving}) – 3:43 (Es lo Mejor, 1974)
11. "Triste Canción" (_{Sad Song}) – 5:38 (Simplemente, 1984)
12. "A.D.O." – 8:46 (Es lo Mejor, 1974)
13. "No le Hagas Caso" (_{Don't Listen to Them}) – 2:36 (Three Souls in My Mind III, 1972)
14. "Chavo de Onda" (_{Cool Kid}) – 7:43 (Chavo de Onda, 1973)
- _{Album and year of original release inside parenthesis}

== Personnel ==
- Alex Lora – guitar, vocals, producer, mixing
- Rafael Salgado – harmonic
- Eduardo Chico – guitar
- Pedro Martínez – drums, backing vocals
- Ruben Soriano – bass
- Chela DeLora – backing vocals, concept

=== Guest musicians ===
- Felipe Souza – electric & rhythm guitar, mixing
- Lalo Toral – piano
- Oscar Zarate – guitar
- Gerardo Garcia – piano
- Kenny Aviles, Norma Valdez – backing vocals
- Zbigniew Paleta – violin
- Cesar Gomez, Adolfo Diaz, Jose Lopez, Chucho Lopez – brass instruments

=== Technical personnel ===
- Chuck Johnson – mixing, mixing assistant
- Richard Kaplan – engineer, mixing
