= Sinfónico II =

Sinfonico II

Compilation album by El Tri
- Released: August 21, 2001
- Genres: Rock, blues
- Length: 66:57
- Label: WEA
- Producer: Alex Lora

El Tri chronology
No Podemos Volar (2000)	Sinfonico II (2001)	No Te Olvides de la Banda (2002)

Sinfonico II (Symphonic II) (2001) is the eighteenth album and first compilation album by Mexican rock and blues band El Tri. Is the second one to contain (as the name implies) collaboration of a symphonic orchestra.

The band collaborated with conductor Eduardo Diazmuñoz.

== Track listing ==
All tracks by Alex Lora except where noted.

1. "San Juanico" – 5:52 (Simplemente, 1984)
2. "El Blues de la Llanta" (The Blues of The Tire) (Lora, Sergio Mancera) – 5:56 (Qué Rico Diablo, 1977)
3. "Oye Cantinero" (_{Hey, Bartender}) – 5:41 (Three Souls in My Mind III, 1972)
4. "Perdedor" (Loser) – 4:43 (Una Rola Para Los Minusvalidos, 1994)
5. "Nunca Digas Que No" (Never Say No) – 4:42 (Hecho en México, 1985)
6. "Ya Estamos Hartos" (We Are Tired Of It) – 3:40 (Lora, Su Lira y Sus Rolas, 1999)
7. "Millones de Niños" (Millions of Children) – 9:15 (Una Leyenda Viva Llamada El Tri, 1990)
8. "Todo Me Sale Mal" (Everything I Do Go Wrong) – 3:12 (Fin de Siglo, 1998)
9. "Parece Fácil" (It Looks Easy) – 6:55 (Cuando Tú No Estás, 1997)
10. "Esclavo del Rocanrol" (Slave of Rock`n Roll) (Rodrigo Levario, Lora) – 3:17 (Cuando Tú No Estás, 1997)
11. "Negro Como Tu Conciencia" (Black As Your Conscience) – 3:46 (25 Años, 1993)
12. "Amnesia" – 4:03 (La Devaluacion, 1975)
13. "La Raza Más Chida" (The Coolest Race) – 4:22 (Una Rola Para los Minusvalidos, 1994)
- _{Album and year of original release inside parenthesis}

== Personnel ==
=== Musicians ===
- Alex Lora – guitar, bass, vocals, producer, mixing
- Rafael Salgado – harmonic
- Eduardo Chico – guitar
- Oscar Zarate – guitar
- Chela Lora – backing vocals, art direction
- Ramon Perez – drums

=== Guest musicians ===
- Benjamin Alarcón – trombone
- Gabriel Perez Cruz – trombone
- Barbara Klessa Novak – violin
- Lalo Toral – piano, arranger

=== Technical ===
- Patricia Abdelnour – assistant engineer
- Alberto Núñez – arranger
- Felipe Souza – arranger
- Mark Chalecki – mastering
- Pablo Munguia – engineer, mixing, supervisor
- Sergio Rivero – photography
- Jean B. Smit – engineer, mastering, recorder
- Humberto Terán – engineer
- Eugenio Toussaint – arranger
