= Sinfónico (El Tri album) =

Live album by El Tri
- Released: May 4, 1999
- Recorded: October 12 & 13, 1998
- Genre: Rock, Blues
- Length: 71:31
- Label: WEA
- Producer: Alex Lora

El Tri chronology
Lora, Su Lira y Sus Rolas (1998)	Sinfónico (1999)	No Podemos Volar (2000)

Sinfónico (Symphonic) (1999) is the sixteenth album and fourth live album by Mexican rock and blues band El Tri. The recording was the first with an orchestra as a celebration of the 30 years of the band.

The album received a gold certification in Mexico.

== Track listing ==
1. "Virgen Morena" (Brown-Skinned Virgin) – 8:31 (Cuando Tú No Estás, 1997)
2. "Mente Roquera" (Rocker Mindset) – 5:46 (La Devaluación, 1975)
3. "Maria Sabina" – 5:41 (21 Años Después, Alex Lora y El Tri, 1989)
4. "Los Minusválidos" (_{The Handicapped}) (Chicho Mora, Lora, Martinez, Rafael Salgado, Ruben Soriano, Felipe Souza) – 4:03 (Una Rola Para los Minusvalidos, 1994)
5. "Las Piedras Rodantes" (_{The Rolling Stones}) – 3:20 (Una Rola Para los Minusvalidos, 1994)
6. "El Niño Sin Amor" (_{The Child Without Love}) – 3:52 (El Niño Sin Amor, 1986)
7. "Difícil" (_{Difficult}) (Lora, Horacio Reni) – 3:34 (21 Años Después, Alex Lora y El Tri, 1989)
8. "Cuando Tú No Estás" (When You Aren't Here) – 5:06 (Cuando Tú No Estás, 1997)
9. "Nostalgia" – 6:01 (Fin de Siglo, 1998)
10. "Triste Canción" (_{Sad Song}) - 9:21 (Simplemente, 1984)
11. "Pobre Soñador" (_{Poor Dreamer}) (Lora, Souza) – 6:49 (25 Años, 1993)
12. "A.D.O." – 9:27 (Es lo Mejor, 1974)

== Personnel ==
- Alex Lora – guitar, bass, vocals, producer, mixing
- Rafael Salgado – harmonic
- Eduardo Chico – guitar
- Oscar Zarate – guitar
- Chela Lora – backing vocals, planning, coordination
- Ramon Perez – drums

=== Guest musicians ===
- Lalo Toral – piano
- Felipe Souza – guitar
- Zbigniew Paleta – violin

=== Orchestra ===
- Eduardo Diazmuñoz – director
- violin – Toribio Amaro, Dinu Bilciurescu, Flavie Boeda, Concertino, Camilo Hernandez Cortez, Adriana Galfi, Teodoro Galvez, Mario Góngora, Serguei Gorbenko, Janina Herman, Pedro Hernandez, Viktoria Horti, Iouri Kulikov, Beata Kurkawska, Ulises Aguirre Lazcano, José Juan Melo, Martha Olvera, Roberto Pansera, Carlos Rosas, Konstantine Saksonskiy, Luis Meza Sanchez, Vera Silantieva
- viola – Tomas Albendea, Paul Abbot, Chingiz Mamedov, Rousell Montanez, Emigdio Espinoza Saandoval, Gerardo Sánchez Vizcaino, Isabel Sosa, Milana Soboleva,
- cello – Jorge Amador Bedolla, Loudmilla Beglarian, Carlos Casteneda, Luz Maria Frenk, Jacek Gebezynski, Iván Nemech Granchak, Rebeca Mata Sandoval
- bass fiddle – David Bretón, Victor Hugo Floes Herrera, Nicolo Popov, Marco Antonio Quiñones, Joel Trejo
- flute – Rafael Urrusti, Ricardo
- piccolo – Medina Femat
- oboe – Eddie Spencer, Kioko Nerike
- English horn – Nerike
- clarinet – Austreberto Mendez, Martin Arnold
- bass clarinet – Arnold
- saxophone – Baltazar Chavarría
- bassoon – David Ball, Gerardo Ledezma
- horn – Javier Leon Machorro, Allison McKee, Carlos Torres, Elizabeth Rising
- trumpet – Ricardo Kirgan, Jaime Mendez, William Neal Woolworth
- trombone – Julio Briseño, Gustavo Rosales
- bass trombone – Gabriel Pérez
- tuba – Paul Conrad
- cymbals – Abel Benítez Torres
- percussion – Armando Zerquera Balbuena, Armando Zerquera
- Harp – Gounta Salaks

=== Technical personnel ===
- Amir Gay – A&R
- Maricela Valencia – coordination
- Fernando Aceves – photography
- Jose Argil – engineer
- Rodrigo Argil – engineer
- Laura Cardenas – art direction
- Mark Chalecki – mastering
- Jan Carlo DeFan – production assistant
- Raul Durand – technical assistance
- Pablo Esposito – assistant engineer
- Marco Gamboa – mixing assistant
- Gil Garcia – technical assistance
- Rito Hernandez – assistant engineer
- Victor Moran Lopez – orchestra coordination
- Miguel Martinez – assistant director, mixing assistant
- Sylvia Meza – art direction
- Francisco Miranda – engineer
- Arnulfo Montes – technical assistance
- Carlos Montaño – technical support
- Juan Carlos Paz Y Puente – executive producer
- José Luis Pichardo – technical assistance
- Fernando Roldán – engineer
- Jean Smit – engineer
- Humberto Terán – engineer
- Salvador Tercero – director, engineer, recording director
