= MTV Unplugged (El Tri album) =

Live album by El Tri
- Released: Aug 31, 2004
- Recorded: 1995
- Genre: Rock, Blues
- Label: WEA
- Producer: Alex Lora

El Tri chronology
Alex Lora: 35 Años y lo Que le Falta Todavía (2004)	MTV Unplugged (2004)	Más Allá del Bien y el Mal (2005)

MTV Unplugged is the twenty-third album and sixth live album (released, third recorded) by Mexican rock and blues band El Tri. Recorded on June, 1995 for the MTV Unplugged series in Miami, Florida, and was released almost 10 years later on August 31, 2004.

== Track listing ==
All tracks by Alex Lora

1. "Difícil" (Difficult) – 3:09 (_{21 Años Después, Alex Lora y El Tri, 1989})
2. "Oye Cantinero" (Hey, Bartender) – 4:40 (_{Three Souls in My Mind III, 1972})
3. "Mente Rockera" (Rocking Mind) – 4:44 (_{La Devaluación, 1975})
4. "Las Piedras Rodantes" (The Rolling Stones) – 3:50 (_{Una Rola Para los Minusvalidos, 1994})
5. "Los Minusválidos" (The Handicapped) – 3:49 (_{Una Rola Para los Minusvalidos, 1994})
6. "Triste Canción" (Sad Song) – 7:42 (_{Simplemente, 1984})
7. "Niño Sin Amor" (The Child Without Love) – 5:37 (_{El Niño Sin Amor, 1986})
8. "Pobres de los Niños" (Poor Kids) – 3:24 (_{Bellas de Noche, 1979})
9. "Chavo de Onda" (Cool Kid) – 6:30 (_{Chavo de Onda, 1973})
10. "Pobre Soñador" (Poor Dreamer) – 4:48 (_{25 Años, 1993})
11. "Perro Negro" (Black And Stray Dog) – 4:07 (_{Chavo de Onda, 1973})
12. "Chilango incomprendido"
13. "A.D.O." – 7:26 (_{Es lo Mejor, 1974})
- _{Album and year of original release inside parenthesis}

== Personnel ==
- Alex Lora – guitar, bass, vocals, producer, mixing
- Rafael Salgado – harmonic
- Eduardo Chico – guitar
- Oscar Zarate – guitar
- Chela Lora – backing vocals
- Pedro Martinez – drums
- Ruben Soriano – bass

=== Guest musicians ===
- Zbigniew Paleta – violin
- Eduardo Toral – keyboards

=== Technical personnel ===
- Gabriel Baptiste – programming
- Craig Brock – editing, mastering, mixing
- Peter Yianilos, Raul Gutierrez, Jason Griffith, Bob Broun – audio supervisor
- Bob Small, Jimmy Burns – concept
- Eileen Roberts, Bruno Del Granado, Guido Caroni – artist coordination
- Tim Fox, Ken Carpenter – technical director
- Joaquin Perez Fernandez, Marco Cataño – A&R
- Emilce Elgarresta, Barbara Corcoran – executive producer
- Lynn Fainchtein – art direction
- David Rojas, Johnny Medina, Joe Hernandez, Dalex Gnochi – production assistant
- Miriam Luciow – assistant producer
- Alejandro Pels – producer
- Alfonso Peña – product manager
- Joe Perota – director
- Fernando Roldán – mastering
- Ricardo Trabulsi – photography
- Raul Videgaray – assistant
- Antoinette Zel – legal advisor
