= En Vivo!!! Y a Todo Calor =

Live album by El Tri
- Released: 1991
- Genre: Rock
- Length: 74:26
- Label: Warner Music Latina
- Producer: Alex Lora

El Tri chronology
Una Leyenda Viva Llamada El Tri (1990)	En Vivo!!! Y a Todo Calor (1991)	Indocumentado (1992)

En Vivo!!! Y a Todo Calor (Live And At Full Heat) (1991) is the eighth album and second live album by Mexican rock and blues band El Tri.

Recorded at the Hollywood Palladium, this was the first large scale concert in the United States for the band. In the liner notes, the band acknowledges the efforts of Mexican immigrants to survive in the United States.

== Track listing ==
_{All tracks by Alex Lora}

1. "Perro Negro y Callejero" (_{Black And Stray Dog}) – 3:40 (Chavo de Onda, 1973)
2. "Viejas de Vecindad" (_{Neighborhood's old hags}) – 4:52 (Una Leyenda Viva Llamada El Tri, 1990)
3. "Nunca Digas Que No" (_{Never Say No}) – 6:00 (Hecho en México, 1987)
4. "Oye Cantinero" (_{Hey, Bartender}) – 5:15 (Three Souls in My Mind III, 1972)
5. "Un Día en la Vida" (_{A Day In Life}) – 5:14 (21 Años Después, Alex Lora y El Tri, 1989)
6. "Metro Balderas" (_{Balderas Subway}) (Alex Lora, Rockdrigo) – 5:10 (Simplemente, 1984)
7. "Nocivo Para la Salud" (_{Harmful To Health}) – (Otra Tocada Mas, 1988)
8. "María Sabina" – 5:00 (21 Años Después, Alex Lora y El Tri, 1989)
9. "Que Viva el Rock and Roll" – 3:03 (Three Souls in My Mind III, 1972)
10. "Mente Rockera" (_{Rocking Mind}) – 4:50 (La Devaluación, 1975)
11. "Encuentros Cercanos del 3er Sexo" (_{Close Encounters of The Third Sex}) – 5:50 (21 Años Después, Alex Lora y El Tri, 1989)
12. "El As No Conocido" (_{The Unknown As}) (Lora, Sergio Mancera) – 2:51 (21 Años Después, Alex Lora y El Tri, 1989)
13. "Millones de Niños" (_{Millions Of Children}) – 6:45 (Una Leyenda Viva Llamada El Tri, 1990)
14. "Abuso de Autoridad" (_{Authority Abuse}) – 3:22 (Chavo de Onda, 1973)
- _{Album and year of original release inside parenthesis}

== Personnel ==
- Alex Lora – guitar, vocals
- Rafael Salgado – harmonic
- Felipe Souza – electric & rhythm guitar
- Eduardo Chico – guitar
- Pedro Martínez – drums
- Ruben Soriano – bass
