= Metro Balderas (song) =

1984 song by Rockdrigo González

"Metro Balderas", as it is generally known, or for its original name, "Estación del metro Balderas" ("Balderas subway station"), is a song by Mexican rock musician Rodrigo "Rockdrigo" González, which refers to a man looking for a woman who got lost in the crowd at Mexico City Metro station Metro Balderas.

This song, along with other González's songs such as Distante instante and Balada del asalariado, can be found in the album Hurbanistorias, recorded in 1984. These songs are available online at González's official website.

González had enormous influence on Mexican rock bands, such as El Tri and Botellita de Jerez; his songs have been recorded many times, especially after his death.

In 2003, a tribute album was recorded by the name "Ofrenda a Rockdrigo" ("An offering to Rockdrigo"). A plaque on Balderas subway station was placed on September 19, 2004 to remember Rockdrigo on the nineteenth anniversary of his death, at 34, when his apartment building collapsed during the big earthquake of 1985 in Mexico City.

== Contents of the song ==
The original song is built as the monologue of an alienated subject hijacking a train, with lines such as:

Get lost from here, mister engineer,

this is a hijack, I'll drive the train. [...]

You better pay attention or I'll shoot you,

haven't you noticed how upset I am? [...]

Once the hijacker's character has been defined, his motivations are eventually revealed and the repeated as a choir all along the song:

Four years ago I lost my girlfriend

in these crowds that form here. [...]

I looked for her at platforms and waiting rooms,

but she just got lost in Balderas station. [...]

It was in Balderas subway station, [...]

...there a wave of people took her away [...]

...there I lost my love [...]

...Darling, I searched for you in every train. [...]

The Balderas subway station, as the downtown crossing of the oldest subway line (Line 1) with the longest one (Line 3), has been known for years for its excessive crowds where people gets easily lost, so the story actually makes plenty of poetic sense for local listeners.

Although searching for a lost girlfriend at a subway station for four years, or even hijacking a subway train because of it, is unlikely, these events give the song much of its poetic and ironic force. By exaggerating the loneliness and despair of a person whose emotional life is overwhelmed and ignored by the city, the song draws attention to their suffering.

That subject is far from new; Rockdrigo was fond of universal literature and must have been influenced by some of the many authors who have explored the loneliness of individual in the big city. His intimate and tragicomic tone can be understood in many cultures; but his language is plain and definitely local, chilango (that is, rooted in Mexico City), to the point that Rockdrigo was compared with the popular songwriter, singer and urban chronicler Chava Flores, who always used Mexican vernacular music forms and never came even close to having been a rock musician.

Despite the differences of age, generation and style between Chava Flores and Rockdrigo we should say that, at that time, such language and subjects were very innovative in Mexican rock, which until then had been confined between translated American and British covers, dancing rhythms, love ballads, some misunderstood virtuosism and a lot of semi-clandestine young protest.

Until the mid-1980s, most conservative groups of Mexican society were wary of Rock because of its load of rebellion and protest, so only artists who wrote mostly about love and used "acceptable" music forms usually tended to prosper. On the other hand, liberal groups, left and intellectuals were also wary of Rock because it was considered an aggression against Mexicanity and a by-product of Imperialism. Maybe the most important contribution by Rockdrigo in his lifetime was to show some kind of compatibility between Chava Flores and Bob Dylan.

== Covers and versions ==
The original version album, Hurbanistorias (1984), was not commercially distributed until a long time after Rockdrigo González was dead; in the mid-1980s, it could only be found in a few music stores, at the Tianguis Cultural del Chopo, in such marginal places or in some almost clandestine way.

The darkness, slow rhythm and almost ascetic instrumentation of his "rupestre" style (Rockdrigo was dubbed as "the Mexican Bob Dylan"), contributed along with the difficulty in finding copies for the original version to be scarcely known at that time.

Meanwhile, the veteran band Three Souls in my Mind reappeared in 1985 realigned, renamed as El Tri, with a new recording company and a much wider commercial reach. Their album "Simplemente", better arranged, produced and sold than all its precedents, was able to touch a broader audience, at the beginning of what came to be a craving frenzy for rock in Spanish.

As El Tri recorded Metro Balderas and featured it in their album Simplemente, that came to be the most known version of this song. Music remained without essential changes, even though in the original version Rockdrigo was accompanied only by his guitar and harmonica; El Tri arranged it for a whole rock band, plus a saxophone, giving it a faster, more rocker, more attractive and less intimate rhythm.

It is in the lyrics where significant changes can be found, which, rather than just a cover, make it a different version. Changes are such that copyright for the song in Simplemente is credited to González and Alejandro Lora, leader, vocalist and guitar player of El Tri.

So, many people often think that "Metro Balderas" is an original song by El Tri; same happens with other songs by Rockdrigo, such as Asalto chido, recorded by Botellita de Jerez.

The most significant changes in the El Tri version are:

1. Original version was named "Estación del metro Balderas", but El Tri version is just "Metro Balderas":

2. All lines about the hijacking, including menaces to the engineer, and the vague and humorous Freudian quote, were suppressed. There are no more "platforms" or "waiting rooms". All references to a train or a train station disappear.

3. Interlocution is no longer to a "Mister Engineer" ("señor operador", as a train driver would be respectfully called), but to a chauffeur; this word ("chofer") is only used for taxi, bus or truck drivers. Then again, "Balderas station" is replaced by "Metro Balderas". So it seems that the story is no longer situated inside the tunnels, but at street level; the individual is not travelling on the subway, but in a taxi, a bus or a truck.

4. "Metro Hidalgo", as in the original version, is a centric subway station on Line 3, very close to Balderas. El Tri replaces "take me to Hidalgo or wherever you want" for new, more distant places, as "La Villa", "la San Simón", "Copilco", "Contreras", "La Curva" or "la Escandón".

The inclusion of new places by El Tri adds a new hyperbolic twist to the story: La Villa and Copilco are in both extremes of the very long Line 3 (22 kilometers). La Villa can be reached one station before the northern end of the line (Metro Indios Verdes) and Copilco is located one station before the southern end (Metro Universidad).

There seems to be an intention in mentioning the stations located just before both ends, but is feasible to consider that "Indios Verdes" and "Universidad" have too long names to fit into the metrics of the song.

Besides, none of the other places mentioned fit with an existing subway station. San Simón and Escandón neighborhoods are rather far away from Balderas; Contreras, an outskirt area beside wooded mountains, is almost the opposite to Downtown.

"La Curva" was a popular beer saloon at the Del Valle neighborhood, highly praised by El Tri in another song of the same album, specially written for it.

5. Some lines saying "there I lost my love" were replaced by "there remained the trace of our love".

6. What got "smeared" at Balderas was "my reputation", instead of "my heart". To be "smeared" ("embarrado") in Mexico City slang can be used as "to be run over", but also in the same sense of calumny it can have in English ("to be the subject of a calumny"), or as "to be accused of being involved in some dirty issue", so this new sense can be feasible, according to the end of the song.

7. What makes all this coherent is revealed to the listener in the last verse, where El Tri says:

Fue en la estación del metro Balderas,

ahí fue donde ella se metió al talón.

That is, in Mexico City slang:

It was there, at Balderas subway,

where she entered into prostitution.

Argentine band Los Enanitos Verdes made a cover of the El Tri version in 1998 for their Tracción Acústica album. In the 1980s, a Mexican Rock band, "Grupo Dama" recorded a cover of this song.
