= En Vivo!!! En la Cárcel de Santa Martha =

Live album by El Tri
- Released: 1989
- Genres: Rock, Blues
- Length: 72:59
- Label: WEA
- Producer: Alex Lora

El Tri chronology
Otra Tocada Mas (1988)	En Vivo!!! En la Cárcel de Santa Martha (1989)	21 Años Después, Alex Lora y El Tri (1989)

En Vivo!!! En la Cárcel de Santa Martha (Live!!! in the Santa Martha Jail) (1989) is the fifth album by the Mexican rock and blues band El Tri. The album is the first one recorded live with this incarnation of the band and the second one along with seventh album Three Souls in My Mind (also recorded at a jail).

It was recorded at the Cárcel de Santa Martha Acatitla, a women's prison.

== Track listing ==
_{All tracks by Alex Lora}

- "Introduction" - 0:47
- "Dialogue" - 0:14
1. "Caseta de cobro" (_{Toll Booth}) - 5:01 (Es lo Mejor, 1974)
2. "Presta" (_{Lend}) - 3:34 (Qué Rico Diablo, 1977)
3. "Cuando estoy con mis cuates" (_{When I Am With My Pals}) - 4:14 (Es lo Mejor, 1974)
4. "Apriétame" (_{Squeeze me}) - 6:00 (Three Souls in My Mind III, 1972)
5. "Mente rockera" (_{Rocking Mind}) - 6:29 (La Devaluación, 1975)
  - "Dialogue" - 0:16
6. "Pobres de los niños" (_{Poor Kids}) - 3:25 (Bellas de Noche, 1979)
  - "Dialogue" - 0:20
7. "A.D.O." - 6:10 (Es lo Mejor, 1974)
  - "Dialogue" - 0:36
8. "El niño sin amor" (_{Kid Without Love}) - 2:25 (El Niño Sin Amor, 1986)
9. "Otra oportunidad" (_{Another Chance}) - 3:46 (D'Mentes, 1980)
10. "Seguro de vida" (_{Life Insurance}) - 5:52 (Otra Tocada Mas, 1988)
  - "Dialogue" - 0:10
11. "Santa Martha" - 8:19
  - "Encore/Dialogue" - 1:37
12. "Triste canción" (_{Sad Song}) - 14:23 (Simplemente, 1984)
  - "Renuncio" (_{I Quit}) (Viejas Rolas de Rock, 1981)
  - "Dialogue"
  - "Oye Cantinero" (_{Hey, Bartender}) (Three Souls in My Mind III, 1972)
- _{Album and year of original release inside parenthesis}

== Personnel ==
- Alex Lora – guitar, vocals
- Rafael Salgado – harmonic
- Sergio Mancera – electric & rhythm guitar
- Pedro Martínez – drums
- Ruben Soriano – bass
