= Planetario (album) =

Studio album by Enanitos Verdes
- Released: December 9, 1997
- Recorded: 1997
- Genre: Rock en español
- Label: EMI
- Producer: Nigel Walter

Enanitos Verdes chronology
| Guerra Gaucha (1996) | Planetario (1997) | Tracción Acústica (1998) |

Planetario is the ninth album of the group Enanitos Verdes published on December 9, 1997. The album was not widely successful. Of the 11 songs on the Planetario, only "Tibio corazon" and "Tan solo un instante" were hits. The album marks the conclusion of Enanitos Verdes's relationship with EMI Odeon Argentina.

== Track listing ==
1. Mil historias (Thousand Stories)
2. Una absurda canción de amor (An absurd song of love)
3. Tan sólo un instante (Only an instant
4. Carmencita
5. Cables sueltos (Free cables)
6. Tibio corazón (Warm heart)
7. Vivir sin tu amor (To live without your love)
8. Decir que sí, decir que no (To say that if, to say that not)
9. El puñal (The dagger)
10. Es tan fácil (It Is so easy)
11. Ganar (Win)
