= Había una Vez =

Habia una vez...

Studio album by Enanitos Verdes
- Released: 1989
- Recorded: 1989
- Genre: Rock en español
- Label: Sony

Enanitos Verdes chronology
Carrousel (1988)	Habia una vez... (1989)	Igual que Ayer (1992)

Habia una vez... is the fifth album of Enanitos Verdes published in 1989. This was the album announcing the dissolution of the group. Marciano Cantero began his career as a soloist. This disc was dedicated to Roberto Cirigliano, Cantero's press agent who died in an accident.

== Track listing ==
1. Típico domingo [Typical Sunday]
2. Sólo quiero estar contigo [I Only Want To Be With You]
3. Amor sangriento [Bloody Love]
4. Si es tan fácil dejarme [If It Is So Easy To Leave Me]
5. Igual a mí [Same To Me]
6. No me puedo conformar [I Can Not Control Myself]
7. El mismo juego [The Same Game]
8. Buscando la manera [Looking The Way]
9. Shunkti
10. Pasión de nácar
