= Sinfónico =

Sinfónico may refer to:

- Sinfónico (El Tri album) 1999
- Sinfónico (Fonseca & Orquesta Sinfónica Nacional de Colombia album) 2014
- Sinfónico (es) album by Los Secretos 2011
- Sinfónico, album by Horacio Salinas 1999
- Sinfónico, album by Joan Manuel Serrat 2003
