= A Talonear =

A Talonear!!

Studio album by El Tri
- Released: June 19, 2007
- Genres: Rock, Blues
- Length: 41:00
- Label: Fonovisa
- Producer: Alex Lora

El Tri chronology
En Directo Desde el Otro Lado (2007)	A Talonear!! (2007)	Nada que Perder (2008)

A Talonear!! (Let's Walk Around) (2007) is the 26th album by Mexican rock and blues band El Tri, based in Mexico City.

== Reception ==
The AllMusic review by Alex Henderson awarded the album four stars stating "Some of yesterday's angry young men have mellowed with time and let go of much of their youthful passion, but not Alejandro Lora... the longtime leader of El Tri is every bit as edgy, ballsy, and gutsy as he was back in the '70s and '80s—which is not to say that anger is the only thing that Lora expresses on this engaging rock en español album... . Longtime fans of El Tri will be happy to know that after all these years, Lora is still very much on top of his game throughout the excellent A Talonear."

Professional ratings
Review scores
Source	Rating
AllMusic	4/5 stars

== Track listing ==
All songs were written by Alex Lora except where noted.

1. "A Talonear II" (Let's Walk Around) – 3:24 minutes
2. "Bésame" (Kiss Me) – 4:05
3. "Nunca Es Tarde" (It's Never Too Late) – 3:56
4. "La Diferencia" (The Difference) – 4:41
5. "Aquí Nadie Me Quiere" (No One Wants Me Here) (Lora, José Martell Peralta) – 3:32
6. "Como No" (What Do You Mean, No) – 5:28
7. "Dora Mitzi" (Daniel Flores, Lora) – 4:41
8. "Mañana" (Tomorrow) (Chela Lora, Lora) – 3:28
9. "Tenemos Que Hacer el Amor" (We Have to Make Love) – 4:12
10. "Que Padre Es Soñar" (How Awesome It Is To Dream) – 3:33

== Personnel ==
- Alex Lora – guitar, vocals, producer, mixing
- Rafael Salgado – harmonic
- Eduardo Chico – guitar
- Oscar Zarate – guitar
- Carlos Valerio – bass
- Chela Lora – backing vocals
- Ramon Perez – drums

=== Guest musicians ===
- Javier Aguirre – trombone
- Arturo Labastida – saxophone

=== Technical ===
- Craig Brock – cowbell, engineer, production assistant
- David Bojorges – mastering
- Raúl Duran – production assistant
