= En Directo Desde el Otro Lado =

Live album by El Tri
- Released: Jan 9, 2007
- Recorded: 2006
- Genre: Rock, Blues
- Length: 62:35
- Label: Fonovisa
- Producer: Alex Lora

El Tri chronology
Más Allá del Bien y el Mal (2005)	En Directo Desde el Otro Lado (2007)	A Talonear (2007)

En Directo Desde el Otro Lado (Straight from the Other Side) (2007) is the twenty-fifth album and seventh live album by Mexican rock and blues band El Tri.

== Reception ==
The Allmusic review by Alex Henderson awarded the album 3.5 stars stating "One doesn't necessarily have to agree with everything Lora says in order to appreciate his overall artistry...But even if one disagrees with some of Loro's points (while agreeing with others), the album's melodies are always solid...All things considered, En Directo Desde el Otro Lado is a valuable and exciting document of El Tri's Gibson Amphitheater show of 2006.".

Professional ratings
Review scores
Source	Rating
Allmusic	3.5/5 stars

== Track listing ==
All tracks by Alex Lora

1. "Tributo Al Goveneitor" (Tribute to The Governator) – 2:03
2. "Metro Balderas" (Balderas Subway) – 7:16
3. "Si México Ganara el Mundial" (If Mexico Won the World Cup) – 5:09
4. "Presta" (Lend) – 4:56
5. "Abuso de Autoridad" (Abuse of Authority) – 2:21
6. "Políticos Culeros" (Asshole Politicians) – 2:31
7. "El Muro" (The Wall) – 4:28
8. "Masturbado" (Masturbates) – 3:24
9. "Todo por el Rocanrol" (All For Rock`N Roll) – 5:55
10. "Chavas Rockeras" (Rocking Gals) – 2:20
11. "Todos Somos Piratas" (We're All Pirates) – 5:44
12. "Sara" – 4:04
13. "Che Guevara" – 6:45
14. "FZ10" – 2:58
15. "Mujer Diabólica" (Evil Woman) – 3:31

== Personnel ==
- Alex Lora – guitar, vocals, producer, mixing
- Rafael Salgado – harmonic
- Eduardo Chico – guitar
- Oscar Zarate – guitar
- Carlos Valerio - bass
- Chela Lora – backing vocals
- Ramon Perez – drums

=== Guest musicians ===
- Mike Daigeau – trombone
- Dan Fornero – trumpet
- Carlos Hauptvogel – drums
- Arturo Labastida – saxophone
- Sergio Mancera – guitar
- Arturo Solar – trumpet

=== Technical personnel ===
- Alejandra Hoyos – photography
- Alejandra Palacios – assistant
