= Más Allá del Bien y el Mal =

Studio album by El Tri
- Released: November 22, 2005
- Genre: Rock, blues
- Length: 36:37
- Label: Fonovisa
- Producer: Alex Lora

El Tri chronology
MTV Unplugged (2004)	Más Allá del Bien y el Mal (2005)	En Directo Desde el Otro Lado (2007)

Más Allá del Bien y el Mal (Beyond Good And Evil) (2005) is the twenty-fourth studio album by Mexican rock and blues band El Tri. This is the first album with the recording company Fonovisa after parting ways with WEA. AllMusic gave it a positive review.

== Track listing ==
All tracks by Alex Lora except where noted.

1. "Felicidades" (Congratulations) – 2:58
2. "Todos Somos Piratas" (We're all Pirates) – 3:53
3. "Politicos Ratas" (Thieving Politicians) – 3:25
4. "Juan Pablo II" (John Paul II) – 4:06
5. "Queremos Rock" (We Want Rock) – 3:44
6. "Ché Guevara" – 4:43
7. "De Tripas Corazón" (pluck up courage) (Carvajal, Lora) – 3:16
8. "El Peje Atajo" – (Peje's shortcut) – 3:06
9. "Sueño Americano" (American Dream) – 5:05
10. "Dama de Los Callejones" (Lady of The Alleys) (Lora, Moro) – 3:07
11. "Si México Ganara el Mundial" (If Mexico Won The World Cup) – 4:14

== Personnel ==
- Alex Lora – guitar, vocals, producer, mixing
- Rafael Salgado – harmonic
- Eduardo Chico – guitar
- Oscar Zarate – guitar
- Carlos Valerio – bass
- Chela Lora – backing vocals, Art Direction, Graphic Design
- Ramon Perez – drums

=== Guest musicians ===
- Arnaldo Martinez – percussion
- Carlos Martínez – trombone

=== Technical ===
- Craig Brock – engineer, mastering, mixing
- Raul Durand – production assistant
- Manolo Mendez – assistant
- Eduardo Núñez – assistant
- Alejandra Palacios – clothing
- Ricardo Trabulsi – photography
