= Nada que Perder =

Studio album by El Tri
- Released: Sep 23, 2008
- Genres: Rock, blues
- Length: 41:50
- Label: Fonovisa
- Producer: Alex Lora

El Tri chronology
A Talonear (2007)	Nada que Perder (2008)	Del Three a El Tri (2009)

Nada que Perder (Nothing to Lose) (2008) is the twenty-seventh album by Mexican rock and blues band El Tri.

The song "La Raza Indocumentada" was dedicated to Mexicans working in the United States.

== Track listing ==
All tracks by Alex Lora except where noted.

1. "Mi Beatle Favorito" (My Favorite Beatle) – 6:01
2. "La Raza Indocumentada" (The Undocumented People) – 4:30
3. "Nada Que Perder" (Nothing to Lose) – 3:40
4. "Por Donde" (Which Way) – 4:31
5. "Angel de La Guarda" (Guarding Angel) – 4:25
6. "El Rocanrol Me Acompaña" (Rock 'n Roll Accompanies me ) – 2:07
7. "Ya lo Se" (I Know It) – 4:00
8. "Cuando Llueve" (When It Rains) – 4:41
9. "Porque No Te Largas" (Why Don't You Go Away) – 4:31
10. "Musico Callejero" (Street Musician) – 3:23

== Personnel ==
- Alex Lora – guitar, vocals, producer, mixing
- Rafael Salgado – harmonic
- Eduardo Chico – guitar
- Oscar Zarate – guitar
- Carlos Valerio – bass
- Chela Lora – backing vocals
- Ramon Perez – drums

=== Guest musicians ===
- Javier Aguirre – trombone
- Arturo Labastida – saxophone
- Esteban Reyes – trumpet

=== Technical ===
- Angel Aguirre – graphic design
- Craig Brock – engineer, mastering, mezcla, production assistant
- Raúl Duran – assistant
- Fernando Roldán – mixing
