= Simplemente =

Simplemente (Galician or Spanish for "simply") may refer to:

- Simplemente (Chayanne album), 2001
  - "Simplemente", the album's title track
- Simplemente (El Tri album), 1984
