= Nectar (Enanitos Verdes album) =

Studio album by Enanitos Verdes
- Released: June 15, 1999
- Recorded: January – March 1999
- Genre: Rock en español
- Label: Universal Music
- Producer: Coti Sorokin

Enanitos Verdes chronology
Tracción Acústica (1998)	Nectar (1999)	Amores lejanos (2002)

Nectar, also written as Néctar, released on June 15, 1999, is the eleventh album of rock en español group Enanitos Verdes. It was produced by Coti Sorokin, and was recorded and mixed entirely in Buenos Aires between the months of January and March 1999. It received a nomination for Best Latin Rock or Alternative Album at the 42nd Annual Grammy Awards, becoming the group's second and last nomination at the ceremony.

The album, which includes ten songs, is a blend of different musical styles such as rock and ballads, as well as regional rhythms.

== Track listing ==
1. Cordillera [Mountain range] - 4:39
2. Hombre Vegetal [Vegetable man] - 5:07
3. Tequila - 4:05
4. Luz de Día [Daylight] - 4:29
5. Futuro Mejor [Better future] - 4:54
6. Mal de Amores [Lovesickness] - 3:59
7. Ay! Dolores - 4:04
8. Rebeca - 4:17
9. Piel [Skin] - 2:53
10. La Banda de la Esquina [The corner band] - 5:10
