= Statue of Álex Lora =

Statue in Puebla, Mexico

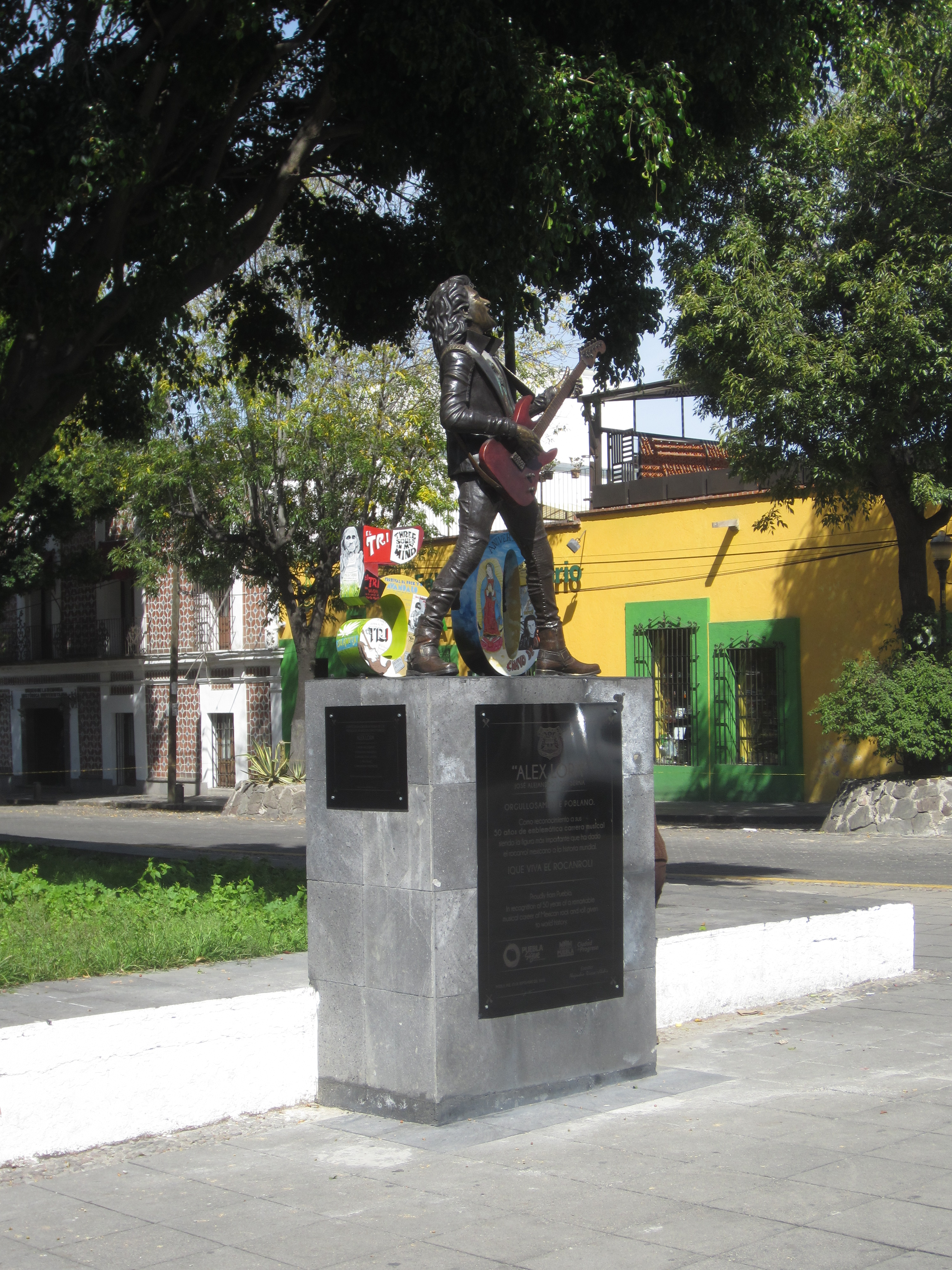
- The statue in 2018
- Subject: Álex Lora
- Location: Puebla, Puebla, Mexico; 19°2′24.1″N 98°11′31.3″W

The statue of Álex Lora is installed in the city of Puebla, in the Mexican state of Puebla.
