= Indocumentado =

Studio album by El Tri
- Released: 1992
- Genre: Rock
- Length: 37:46
- Label: WEA
- Producer: Alex Lora

El Tri chronology
| En Vivo!!! Y a Todo Calor (1991) | Indocumentado (1992) | 25 Años (1993) |

Indocumentado (Undocumented) (1992) is the ninth studio album by Mexican rock and blues band El Tri.

The name of the album comes for the main single, "Indocumentado" is the common word for a Mexican person or any other nationality that find its way into the US without the proper documentation; The song is a tale of the physical and emotional hardships the "Indocumentado" goes through.

The band also pays homage to legendary Mexican singer Francisco Gabilondo Soler, better known as "Cri Cri", on the album.

== Track listing ==
All tracks by Alex Lora except where noted.

1. "El Dragón" (_{The Dragon}) – 3:48
2. "Cuando Canta el Grillo" (_{When The Cricket Sings}) (Lora, Rafael Salgado) – 4:09
3. "Indocumentado" (_{Undocumented}) – 4:19
4. "No Vuelvo a Agarrar la Jarra" (_{I Won't Take The Jar Again}) – 2:44
5. "Nadie Sabe Para Quién Trabaja" (_{No One Knows Who They Work For}) (Lora, Pedro Martinez) – 3:42
6. "Valle de Lágrimas" (_{Valley Of Tears}) – 2:57
7. "Tirando a Matar" (_{Shoot To Kill}) – 3:35
8. "Así Se Hacen los Chismes" (_{That's How Gossip Is Born}) – 4:04
9. "El Blues de la Navidad" (_{Christmas Blues}) – 3:39
10. "Igual Pa' Todos" (_{The Same For Everyone}) – 4:48

== Personnel ==
- Alex Lora – guitar, arranger, vocals, producer, mixing, artistic producer
- Rafael Salgado – harmonic
- Felipe Souza – electric & rhythm guitar
- Eduardo Chico – guitar
- Pedro Martínez – drums, backing vocals
- Ruben Soriano – bass
- Chela DeLora – backing vocals, Coordination

=== Guest musicians ===
- Carolyn Asplin – violin on "Tirando a matar"
- Victor Anderson – brass instrument
- Victor Cisneros – Tenor Sax

=== Technical ===
- Pancho Gilardi – photography
- Bernie Grundman – mastering
- Michael Hoffman – coordination, art coordinator
- Chuck Johnson – mixing, mixing assistant
- Richard Kaplan – engineer, mixing
