= Guerra Gaucha =

Studio album by Enanitos Verdes
- Released: July 9, 1996
- Recorded: 1995–1996
- Genre: Rock en español
- Length: 57:05
- Label: EMI
- Producer: Gustavo Borner

Enanitos Verdes chronology
20 Grandes Éxitos (1995)	Guerra Gaucha (1996)	Planetario (1997)

Singles from Guerra Gaucha
- 1. "Dale Pascual"

Guerra Gaucha is the eighth album of Enanitos Verdes published in 1996. The album featured a number of guest musicians, including famous folk percussionist Domingo Cura (box drum and Peruvian), tango bandoneon player Daniel Binelli, percussionist Luis Conte and singer Ruben Albarrán (of Café Tacuba). Albarrán sings a duet with Marciano Cantero on the song "Ella". The album's musical style blends rock with traditional tango and Latin American folklore.

It has been regarded as one of the best albums of Enanitos Verdes. Some of the songs that stand out "El dia es claro", "Eterna soledad", "Guerra gaucha", and "Dale Pascual."

The album contains fifteen songs, a controversial production of content, but courageous and respectable by the honesty of its lyrics.

== Track listing ==
Guerra gaucha
No.	Title	Writer(s)	Length
1.	"Guerra gaucha [Gaucho War]" (guitar solo by Jeff Baxter)	(Felipe Staiti)	2:42
2.	"Dale Pascual [Let's Go Pascual]"	(Staiti/Marciano Cantero)	3:15
3.	"El día es claro [The Day Is Clear]"	(Cantero/Staiti)	3:28
4.	"Ella [She]" (with Cosme and Domingo Cura)	(Felipe Staiti)	3:39
5.	"Lágrimas en Calcuta [Tears In Calcuta]"	(Staiti/Cantero)	5:08
6.	"¿No te sobra una moneda? [Can't You Spare A Dime?]"	(Charly García)	4:16
7.	"Eterna Soledad [Eternal Loneliness]"	(Cantero/Staiti)	2:53
8.	"El país del no dormir [The No Sleep Country]" (with Daniel Binelli (bandoneón) and Nancy Stein Ross (cello))	(Felipe Staiti)	3:25
9.	"Fuiste [You Were]"	(Staiti/Cantero)	4:44
10.	"El delfín [The Dolphin]"	(Cantero/Staiti)	4:50
11.	"Héroes al fin [Heroes At Last]"	(Staiti/Cantero)	3:35
12.	"Estoy en el infierno [I'm In Hell]"	(Staiti/Daniel Piccolo)	3:10
13.	"Salpicándonos [Splattering]"	(Felipe Staiti)	5:12
14.	"Kumbanquele"	(Staiti/Cantero)	4:07
15.	"Caretas sin alma [Masks Without Soul]"	(Cantero/Staiti)	2:53

Luis Conte guest percussion on tracks 2, 3, 5, 8, 11, 13, 14 and 15.
