= Hoyos en la Bolsa =

Studio album by El Tri
- Released: April 23, 1996
- Venue: Indigo Ranch (Malibu, California)
- Genres: Rock, Blues
- Length: 45:07
- Label: WEA
- Producer: Alex Lora

El Tri chronology
Un Cuarto de Siglo (1995)	Hoyos en la Bolsa (1996)	Cuando Tú No Estás (1997)

Hoyos en la Bolsa (Holes in the Pocket) (1996) is the thirteenth studio album by Mexican rock and blues band El Tri. The album cover references the songs on the album.

The album was recorded at Indigo Ranch Studios in Malibu, California.

== Track listing ==
1. "Todo Sea Por el Rocanrol" (All For Rock`N Roll) (Alex Lora) – 4:44
2. "Pamela" (Lora, Oscar Zárate) – 4:41
3. "Perdónanos la Deuda" (Forgive Us The Debt) (Lora) – 3:59
4. "La Caja Idiota" (Television set) (Lora) – 2:48
5. "El Fantasma" (The Ghost) (Lora) – 3:42
6. "El Enmascarado de Látex" (The Condom (a play on the wrestler Santo's nickname, "el enmascarado de plata")) (Lora, Francisco Barrios) – 4:13
7. "Ruta 100" (Jorge Garcia, Adrian Nuñez) – 3:52
8. "Trabajo Pesado" (Heavy Work) (Lora, Eduardo Chico) – 3:26
9. "Que Regrese Salinas" (Let Salinas Return) (Lora) – 6:08
10. "Hoyos en la Bolsa" (Holes In The Pocket) (Lora) – 3:37
11. "El Canal" (The Channel) (Lora) – 5:51

== Personnel ==
- Alex Lora – guitar, vocals, producer, mixing
- Rafael Salgado – harmonic
- Eduardo Chico – guitar
- Oscar Zarate – guitar
- Pedro Martínez – drums, backing vocals
- Ruben Soriano – bass
- Chela DeLora – backing vocals, concept
- Lalo Toral – piano
- Zbigniew Paleta – violin

=== Guest musicians ===
- Felipe Souza – electric & rhythm guitar, mixing
- Papo Blues – guitar

=== Technical personnel ===
- Chuck Johnson – mixing, mixing assistant, percussion
- Richard Kaplan – engineer, mixing
