= Carrousel (album) =

Studio album by Enanitos Verdes
- Released: 1988
- Recorded: 1988
- Genre: Rock es español
- Label: Sony
- Producer: Andres Calamaro

Enanitos Verdes chronology
Habitaciones Extrañas (1987)	Carrousel (1988)	Había una Vez (1989)

Carrousel is the fourth album by Enanitos Verdes, released in 1988. The production of the disc was again headed by Andres Calamaro. It featured three new hit songs, "Guitarras blancas", "No me veras", and "Soy un perdedor".

== Track listing ==
1. "Sos un perdedor" [You're A Loser]
2. "Guitarras blancas" [White Guitars]
3. "No me verás" [You Will Not See Me]
4. "Un día bien" [One Day Right]
5. "Vengo de última" [I Come Last]
6. "Soy un espejo" [I'm A Mirror]
7. "De hoy en más" [Today In Most]
8. "Alrededor de mí" [Around Me]
9. "Que hacer conmigo" [What To Do With Me]
