= Big Bang (Los Enanitos Verdes album) =

Studio album by Enanitos Verdes
- Released: August 15, 1994
- Recorded: 1993–1994
- Genre: Rock
- Language: Spanish
- Label: Capitol

Enanitos Verdes chronology
Igual que Ayer (1992)	Big Bang (1994)	20 Grandes Éxitos (1995)

Big Bang is the seventh studio album by Argentine rock band Enanitos Verdes, released on August 15, 1994. Big Bang was met with instant success upon its release, quickly becoming one of their best-selling and most popular releases. The track, "Lamento Boliviano", was released as a single and became one of their most popular songs.

In 2021, Mexican singer Junior H covered the song for his album, $ad Boyz 4 Life.

== Track listing ==
1. "Mejor no hablemos de amor" (English title: "Best We Don't Talk About Love")
2. "Lamento boliviano" (English title: "Bolivian Lament")
3. "Celdas" (English title: "Cells")
4. "Yo pagaría" (English title: "I Would Pay")
5. "Piel de nopal (English title: "Cactus Skin")
6. "H.I.V."
7. "Mi primer día sin ti" (English title: "My First Day Without You")
8. "Creo" (English title: "I Believe")
9. "Resplandor de afecto" (English title: "Glow of Affection")
10. "Cuando habla el corazón" (English title: "When the Heart Speaks")
11. "Bailarina" (English title: "Dancer")
12. "Pasaré por tí" (English title: "I'll Pick You Up")
13. "Estoy dispuesto" (English title: "I Am Willing")

== Sales ==
Region	Certification	Certified units/sales
Argentina	—	63,000
