= Contrareloj =

Contrarreloj

Studio album by Enanitos Verdes
- Released: September 2, 1986
- Recorded: May-June 1986
- Studio: Estudios Panda
- Genre: Rock en Español
- Length: 34:44
- Label: Sony
- Producer: Andrés Calamaro

Enanitos Verdes chronology
| Los Enanitos Verdes (album) (1984) | Contrarreloj (1986) | Habitaciones Extrañas (1987) |

Contrareloj ("Countdown" in English) is the second album by Argentine rock band Enanitos Verdes, released in 1986. Contrareloj was produced by Andrés Calamaro for CBS (now Sony). Popular tracks on the album include "La muralla verde," "Conciencia contra reloj," "Cada vez que digo adiós," and "Simulacro de tensión."

== Track listings ==
1. La muralla verde [The Green Wall]
2. Conciencia contrarreloj [Counterclockwise Awareness]
3. Cada vez que digo adiós [Every Time I Say Goodbye]
4. Tus viejas cartas [Your Old Letters]
5. La luz del río [Light of the River]
6. Simulacro de tensión [Tension Mock]
7. Sólo dame otra oportunidad [Just Give Me Another Chance]
8. Luchas de poder [Power Fights]
9. Es una máquina [It's A Machine]
10. Algo terminó mal [Something Ended Up Wrong]

== Sales ==
| Region | Certification | Certified units/sales |
|---|---|---|
| Argentina Sales as of 1987 | — | 60,000 |
