= Sergio García Michel =

- Born: Sergio Arturo García Michel; 28 July 1945; Mexico City, Mexico
- Died: 19 September 2010 (aged 65); Mexico City, Mexico
- Occupations: Film director, cameraman, editor
- Years active: 1966–2010
- Notable work: El Fin 1970; Un toke de roc 1988

Sergio Arturo García Michel (28 July 1945 – 19 September 2010) was a Mexican film director and professor, considered one of the key figures of Super 8 cinema and part of the counterculture movements of La Onda and Rupestre.

== Early life, studies and influences ==
Born on 28 July 1945 in Mexico City, García Michel began his enthusiasm for cinema as a teenager spending entire afternoons watching films at the Tlalpan theatre. In 1966, he bought his first Super 8 camera and shot his first short film named Un dia.

By 1968 and already working as a publicist he enrolled at the Centro Universitario de Estudios Cinematográficos of the UNAM, quitting a year later only to reenter in 1971 but quitting again in 1972 as he already had a professional career in film making. His influences were Richard Lester, Michael Lindsay-Hogg, Kenneth Anger, Michael Wadleigh, Pino Solanas, and counterculture intellectuals like Abbie Hoffman, Timothy Leary and Ken Kesey.

== Works and awards ==
His better known works include: El Fin (Short film, Luis Buñuel Prize, Mexico City 1970), Ah, verdá? (Short film, awarded Best foreign film at Segundo Festival Super 8 in Canary Islands, Spain 1973), Hacia el hombre nuevo (Short film, 1st prize winner at Primer Festival Internacional de Cine Súper 8 m.m. in Cali, Colombia 1976), La Venida del Papa (Documentary about Juan Pablo II in México, 1979), Una Larga experiencia (Documentary about the band Three Souls in my Mind, 1983), ¿Por qué no me las prestas? (Documentary about Rockdrigo Gonzalez, 1995) and Un Toke de Roc: Fable in three acts (Movie, 1988).

He was the founder of the Tlalpan Forum in 1980, an artistic hub in Mexico City, and professor/coordinator of film creation workshop at the Carrillo Gil Museum (1984–1999); in the School of writers from the General society of Mexican writers (1999–2002) and at the Union of Cinematographers (2002).

== Death ==
On 19 September 2010, Garcia Michel was found dead in his house as a result of a heart attack.

== Filmography ==
- Un dia (1966)
- Natasha (1968)
- Y pensar que podemos... (1968)
- El fin (1970)
- El psiquiatra (1972)
- Luto (1971)
- Sinopsis (1971)
- Santa Fe (1971)
- Eran tres (1972)
- La lucha (1972)
- Ah, verdá? (1973)
- Próximamente en esta sala (1973)
- ¡Qué tiempos aquellos! (1973)
- Campamento 2 de octubre (1976)
- Hoy será mañana (1976)
- Panamá, Panamá (1976)
- Hacia el hombre nuevo (1976)
- España: contestación al fascismo (1976)
- La noche del festejo (1977)
- La venida del papa (1979)
- Supermán cayó en Vietnam y Tarzán en Angola (1979)
- Patria Libre (1980)
- Una larga experiencia (1982)
- Un toke de roc (1988)
- Betty Rock y el ultimo súper ocho (1989)
- Rock macizo (1990)
- ¿Y tú qué onda? (1990)
- Un video por la paz (1991)
- Jorge Reyes en el año del eclipse (1992)
- Nuestro ángel de la guarda (1994)
- El ángel de la paz (1995)
- Rockdrigo a 10 años / ¿Por qué no me las prestas? (1996)
- Ruina de utopía (2000)
- Óscar Chávez en Tlayacapan (2002)
- Una nena como yo no se toma a la ligera (2003)
- Santa Aventurera (2006)
- Superbarrio contra la delincuencia organizada (2007)
- La hija de María (2007)
- Be Bop A Lula Comandante espacial. Los Beatles en México (2008)
- El sentido de mi vida (2008)
- El cantar de los cantores (2010)
- El principio del fin (2010, unfinished)

== Collections ==
Un Toke de Roc DVD (co-produced by the UNAM and Contraluz Cine en video, 2006) includes the aforementioned movie, La venida del papa, El fin, Ah verdá? and an in-depth interview.

Superocheros. Antología del Súper 8 en México includes the Agustin's short-film Luz Externa. Garcia Michel made the restoration.

== Literary works ==
- Toward a fourth cinema. Published by the Universidad Autónoma de Zacatecas press in 1973. Re-issued by the Ohio University press in 1999.
