= No Podemos Volar =

Studio album by El Tri
- Released: July 18, 2000
- Recorded: October 12–13, 1999
- Genre: Rock, blues
- Length: 52:28
- Label: WEA
- Producer: Alex Lora, Jim Gaines

El Tri chronology
Sinfónico (1999)	No Podemos Volar (2000)	Sinfónico II (2001)

No Podemos Volar (We Can't Fly) (2000) is the seventeenth studio album by Mexican band El Tri. It is the first one to include Duets, containing 4 of them with recognized singers of Mexican music.

== Track listing ==
All tracks by Alex Lora except where noted.

1. "No Podemos Volar" (We Can't Fly) – 6:34
2. "Madre Tierra" (Mother Earth) – 3:45
3. "Ya No Existen los Héroes" (Heroes No Longer Exist) – 4:02
4. "Amor del Dos de Octubre" (Love of October 2nd (Carlos Carbajal, Lora) – 5:04
5. "Nosotros los Latinos" (We The Latins) – 5:33
6. "Prueba de Amor" (Proof of Love) (Lora, Chela Lora) – 3:36
7. "Todos Necesitamos de Todos" (Everybody Needs Everybody) – 4:25
8. "Cuando Estoy Con Mis Cuates" (When I Am With My Pals) – 3:01
9. "Chilango Exiliado" (Exiled Chilango) – 3:56
10. "En el Último Trago" (In The Last Drink) (José Alfredo Jiménez) – 4:40
11. "Aca Tambien Se Cuecen Habas" (We Cook Beans Over Here Too) (Lora, Oscar Zarate) – 4:11
12. "Todo Por Servir Se Acaba" (Everything Breaks Down For Use) – 3:41

== Personnel ==
- Alex Lora – guitar, bass, vocals, producer, mixing
- Rafael Salgado – harmonic
- Eduardo Chico – guitar, dobro
- Oscar Zarate – guitar
- Chela Lora – backing vocals, planning, coordination
- Ramon Perez – drums

=== Guest musicians ===
- Miguel Rios – vocals in "Madre Tierra"
- Lalo Gameros – violin, vocals in "Cuando Estoy Con Mis Cuates"
- Jorge Navarro – guitar in "Cuando Estoy Con Mis Cuates"
- Alberto "El Cuervo" Angel – vocals in "En el Ultimo Trago"
- Andres Gimenez – vocals in "Todos Necesitamos de Todos"
- Lalo Toral – piano
- Paulinho Da Costa – percussion in "Amor Del 2 de Octube" and "Nosotros Los Latinos"

=== Technical ===
- Fernando Aceves – photography
- Mark Chalecki – mastering
- Andrea E Estrada – photography
- Juan Carlos Frank – make-up
- Jim Gaines – producer
- Pablo Munguia – assistant
- Jorge Navarro – guitar
- Ramon Perez – drums
- Sergio Rivero – photography
- Eddie Sakaki – photography
- Jean B. Smit – engineer, mastering, recorder
