= Los Enanitos Verdes (album) =

1984 studio album by Los Enanitos Verdes

Studio album by Los Enanitos Verdes
- Released: 1984
- Recorded: 1984
- Genre: Rock en Español
- Label: Mordisco
- Producer: Andrés Calamaro

Los Enanitos Verdes chronology
Los Enanitos Verdes (1984)	Contrareloj (1986)

Los Enanitos Verdes is the debut studio album by Argentine rock band Los Enanitos Verdes, released in 1984.

== Track listing ==
1. La nena de diecisiete [The Seventeen-Year-Old Girl]
2. La miraba de atrás [I Saw Her From Behind]
3. Comiendo en el plato del perro [Eating From the Dog Dish]
4. Detrás de las ruinas [Behind the Ruins]
5. Aún sigo cantando [I'm Still Singing]
6. No se metan más [Do Not Mess With Ne]
7. Gente incoherente [Incoherent People]
8. Cambiá, volvé [Change and Come Back]
9. Show del calabozo [Show of the Dungeon]
10. Amor callejero [Street Love]
11. Tengo un sueño en mi alma [I Have a Dream in My Soul]
