= No Te Olvides de la Banda =

Studio album by El Tri
- Released: Jul 16, 2002
- Genre: Rock, Blues
- Length: 58:21
- Label: WEA
- Producer: Alex Lora

El Tri chronology
Sinfónico II (2001)	No Te Olvides de la Banda (2002)	Los Número Uno (2003)

No Te Olvides de la Banda (Don't Forget About the Band) (2002) is the nineteenth studio album by Mexican rock and blues band El Tri.

== Reception ==
The Allmusic review by Drago Bonacich awarded the album 3 stars stating "In an attempt to captivate its fans' attention, the rock en Español outfit previously known as Three Souls in My Mind delivered an album closer to its original style, featuring lyrics mostly based on controversial social issues."

Professional ratings
Review scores
Source	Rating
Allmusic	4/5 stars

== Track listing ==
All tracks by Alex Lora

1. "Chilangolandia" (slang term for Mexico City) – 8:12
2. "Volvimos a Perder" (We Lost Again) – 5:02
3. "Solamente Dios" (Only God) – 5:06
4. "No Te Olvides de la Banda" (Don't Forget About the Band) – 4:31
5. "El Amor Neto" (True Love) – 4:06
6. "Los Espermatozoides" (The Sperms) – 3:13
7. "El Calzón" (The Briefs) – 3:42
8. "Tu Sonrisa" (Your Smile) – 4:44
9. "A Partir de Hoy" (As of Today) – 5:40
10. "Lo Demás Me Vale" (The Hell With The Rest) – 3:46
11. "De la Raza Pa' la Banda" (From The People To The Band) – 10:19

== Personnel ==
- Alex Lora – guitar, bass, vocals, producer, mixing
- Rafael Salgado – harmonic
- Eduardo Chico – guitar
- Oscar Zarate – guitar, mixing
- Chela Lora – backing vocals, art direction
- Ramon Perez – drums
- Lalo Toral – keyboards

=== Technical personnel ===
- Gene Grimaldi – mastering
- Charles Johnson – mixing
- Richard Kaplan – engineer, mixing
- Kevin Meeker – assistant, assistant engineer
- Pablo Munguia – mixing, recording coordinator
