= Igual que Ayer =

Studio album by Enanitos Verdes
- Released: 1992
- Genre: Rock
- Language: Spanish
- Label: EMI
- Producer: Andres Calamaro

Enanitos Verdes chronology
Había una Vez (1989)	Igual que Ayer (1992)	Big Bang (1994)

Igual que Ayer (English transl. Same As Yesterday) is the sixth album by Argentine rock band Enanitos Verdes, released in 1992. The group signed a contract with EMI. Production was led by Andres Calamaro with help from Alejandro Lerner, León Gieco and Manuel Wirtz. It achieved a gold certification.

== Track listing ==
1. Igual que Ayer ("Same As Yesterday") - 4:48
2. Blancoazul ("Whiteblue") - 3:58
3. No Llores Por Su Amor ("Don't Cry for His Love") - 4:37
4. Fiesta Sin Invitación ("Party without Invitation") - 4:17
5. El Temor ("The Fear") - 4:16
6. Amigos ("Friends") - 2:56
7. Era Un Ángel ("She Was an Angel") - 3:34
8. La Luz de Tu Mirar ("The Light of Your Look") - 5:00
9. Jurarás ("You Swear") - 4:07
10. Polizonte ("Cop") - 3:15
11. Siglos de Amor ("Centuries of love") - 4:45
12. Señor Disc-Jockey ("Mister Disc-Jockey") - 3:57
13. Igual Que Ayer (Reprise) Bonus Track - 0:17
14. Era Un Ángel (Sin Piano) Bonus Track - 3:33

(C) MCMXCII. EMI Music Argentina S.A.
