= Habitaciones Extrañas =

Studio album by Enanitos Verdes
- Released: 1987
- Recorded: 1987
- Studio: Estudios Panda
- Genre: Rock en español
- Length: 36:41
- Label: Sony
- Producer: Andres Calamaro

Enanitos Verdes chronology
| Contrareloj (1986) | Habitaciones Extrañas (1987) | Carrousel (1988) |

Habitaciones Extrañas is the third album by the rock band Enanitos Verdes, released in 1987. The album was recorded and mixed in Estudios Panda in Buenos Aires in the fall of 1987.

== Track listing ==
| No. | Title | Length |
|---|---|---|
| 1. | "El Extraño De Pelo Largo" | 2:52 |
| 2. | "Por El Resto" | 4:20 |
| 3. | "Derribando Sueños" | 2:56 |
| 4. | "Pasos" | 4:08 |
| 5. | "Sumar Tiempo No Es Sumar Amor" | 3:35 |
| 6. | "Te Ví En Un Tren" | 4:00 |
| 7. | "Encerrado Sin Amor" | 3:00 |
| 8. | "Sólo Alguien Como Vos" | 2:38 |
| 9. | "Vivo Dos Veces" | 2:40 |
| 10. | "La Misma Luna" | 3:13 |
| 11. | "Atrapado" | 3:19 |
| Total length: | | 40:41 |
