= Tracción Acústica =

Live album by Enanitos Verdes
- Released: January 27, 1998
- Recorded: 1997
- Genre: Rock en español
- Label: Universal Music
- Producer: Cachorro Lopez

Enanitos Verdes chronology
Planetario (1997)	Tracción Acústica (1998)	Nectar (album) (1999)

Tracción Acústica is the tenth album of Enanitos Verdes released on January 27, 1998. Tracción Acústica is a compilation of their greatest hit songs recorded live in high acoustic quality. It includes a tribute to the legendary Mexican rock band El Tri, performing their classic theme "Metro Balderas". The album also contains two unreleased tracks: "El Guerrero" and "Fiesta Jurásica". It received a nomination for Best Latin Rock or Alternative Album at the 41st Annual Grammy Awards, becoming the group's first nomination at the ceremony.

The album was recorded live on October 28 and 29, 1997, in Mexico City. It was their first album with their new record label: PolyGram.
The performance was filmed by television networks for Telehit and was aired in February 1998. Guest artists included Jeff Baxter (Steely Dan - Doobie Brothers) on acoustic guitar and Julieta Venegas on accordion. Other guest artists included: Horacio Gomez on keyboards, Edgardo Pais on guitar; Mark Muller on Pedal Steel, Lap Steel and mandolin; Armando Montiel, Leonardo Munoz and Graham Hawthorne on percussion, and Celsa Mel Gowland and Lorena Alvarez singing choir.

== Track listing ==
1. Por el resto
2. Te vi en un tren
3. El guerrero
4. La muralla verde
5. Sólo dame otra opportunidad
6. Guitarras blancas
7. Cada vez que digo adiós
8. El extraño de pelo largo
9. Tus viejas cartas
10. No me verás / Metro balderas
11. Aún sigo cantando
12. Fiesta jurásica
