= Enanitos Verdes =

Argentine rock band

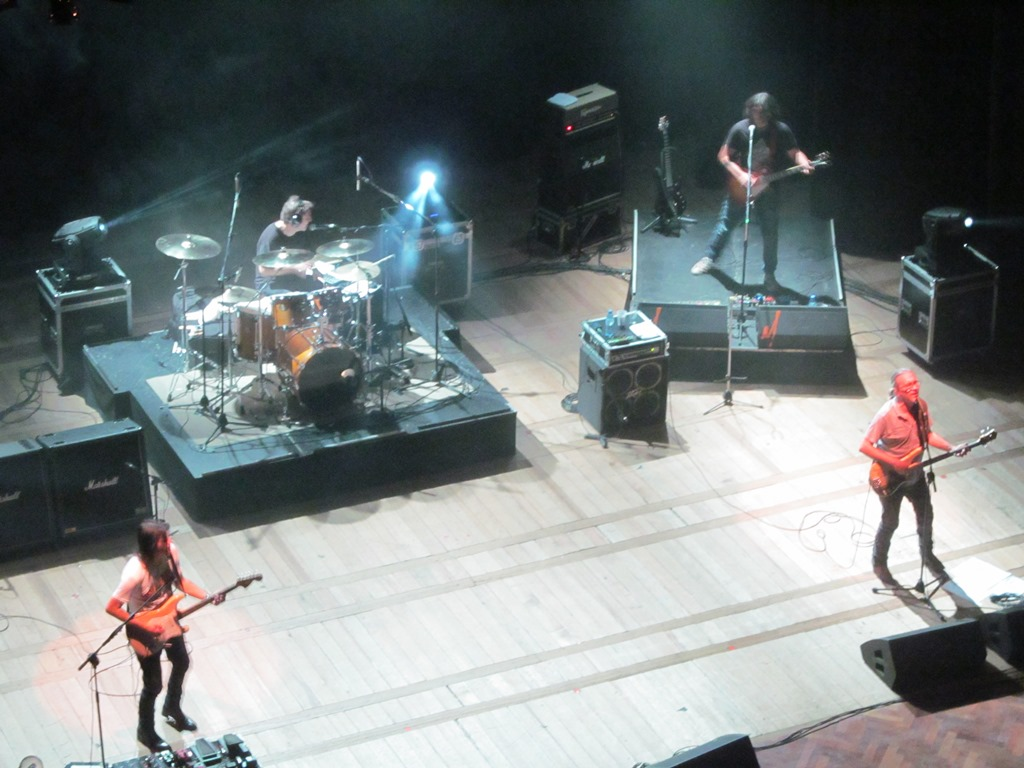
- Los Enanitos Verdes performing in Rosario in 2012

Background information
- Also known as: Los Enanitos Verdes
- Origin: Mendoza, Argentina
- Genres: Rock
- Years active: 1979–1989; 1992–2026
- Labels: Sony; EMI; Universal
- Members: Jota Morelli; Guillermo Vadalá; Bosco Aguilar; Damian "Damiano" Castroviejo; Adriana "Arita" Rodriguez
- Past members: Felipe Staiti; Daniel Piccolo; Sergio Embrioni; Tito Dávila; Marciano Cantero
- Website: losenanitosverdes.net

Enanitos Verdes (formerly known as Los Enanitos Verdes) (lit. "Little green dwarves", roughly equivalent to the English phrase "Little green men") was an Argentine rock band formed in 1979 in Mendoza.

== History ==
The band started in 1979, with Marciano Cantero (bass, keyboards, vocals), Felipe Staiti (guitar) and Daniel Piccolo (drums). That same year, they performed throughout the Cuyo region. Later they traveled to Buenos Aires to record a demo, which was never released.

In 1984, the band added two new members: Sergio Embrioni (guitar and vocals) and Tito Dávila (keyboard). As a quintet, they recorded their first album Los Enanitos Verdes, with the hit "Aún sigo cantando" ("I'm still singing"). Embrioni left the band in 1985.

In 1986, they released their second album, entitled Contrarreloj (Counterclockwise), with the production of Andrés Calamaro. The album included songs such as "Tus viejas cartas" ("Your old letters"), "Cada vez que digo adiós" ("Every time I say goodbye"), and "La muralla verde" ("The green wall"). Their third album Habitaciones extrañas (Strange Rooms) would arrive the following year. Produced again by Calamaro, it included "Te vi en un tren" ("I saw you in a train"), "Por el resto" ("For the Rest") and "El extraño de pelo largo" ("The stranger with the long hair").

In 1988, they did an extensive tour, alongside Miguel Mateos/Zas and Soda Stereo. Over six months, three of their concerts: Viña del Mar (50,000 spectators), Mendoza, Argentina (35,000) and Santiago, Chile (32,000), were attended by more than 30,000 spectators. In that same year, they released their LP, Carrousel. The song "Guitarras blancas" (White guitars) became one of their biggest hits off the LP. A year later, the group broke up, with Marciano Cantero starting his solo career. In 1992, the group got back together, without Dávila, recording the album Igual que ayer (Same as Yesterday).

In 1994, they released the album "Big Bang" on the record label EMI Latin. The album became a huge international success and includes their biggest hit, "Lamento Boliviano". The album also contains the song "Mejor No Hablemos de Amor" (Better Not Talk About Love) and the power ballad "Mi Primer Día Sin Ti" ("My First Day Without You").

In 1998, they released their album Tracción acústica, with the US record company Polygram. This album made them the first Argentine group and third Argentine artist to sign with a US company. This album was nominated for the Grammies in the category "Best Latin Rock Album".

They were part of the Watcha Tour 2000, which included seventeen shows along with Molotov, Aterciopelados, Café Tacuba and A.N.I.M.A.L.

In 2003, they went on tour with Alejandra Guzmán. They have, among other awards, earned a Gaviota de Plata (Silver Gull) at the Festival de Viña del Mar in Chile. That same year, they recorded their album Amores Lejanos with the hit single "Amores Lejanos".

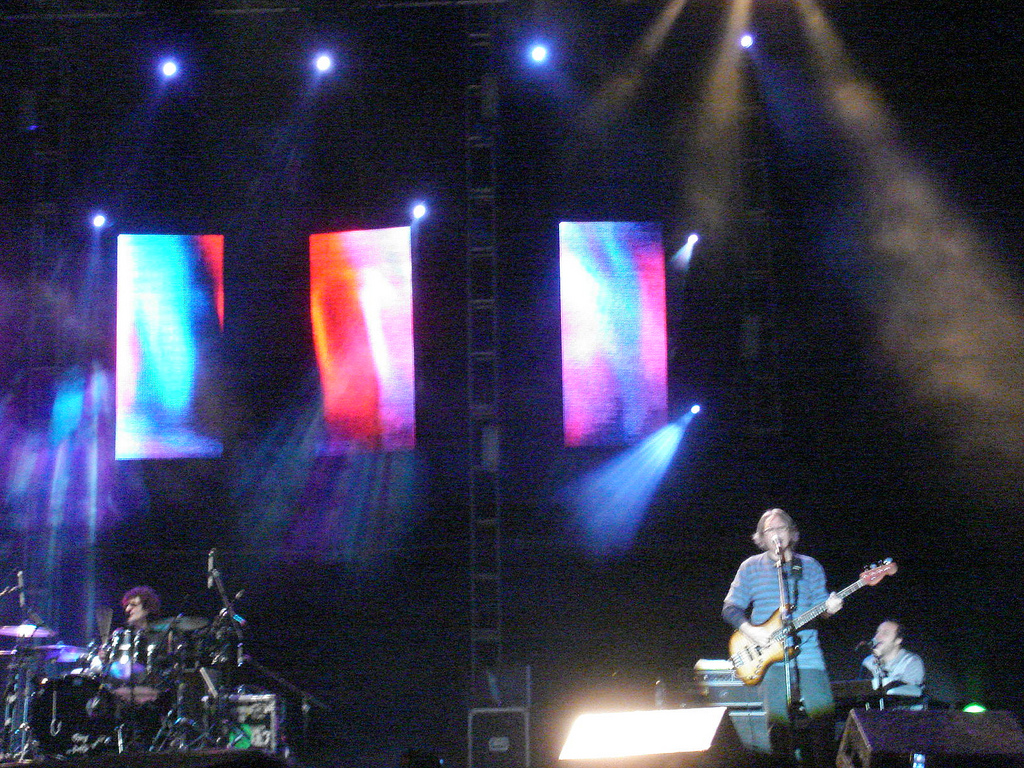
Enanitos Verdes performing in 2008

In 2009, drummer Daniel Piccolo left the band. Jota Morelli from Fito Paez's band replaced him.

Former guitarist Sergio Embrioni committed suicide on 17 February 2011.

The band went on tour in 2018 with Spanish group Hombres G across the United States.

On 8 September 2022, Marciano Cantero, the cofounder, songwriter and frontman of Enanitos Verdes, died in the afternoon following a renal surgical procedure in a private hospital in his hometown of Mendoza. He was 62. The band briefly suspended activities before resuming touring in December.

Finally, the group announced their return to the stage on December 3, 2022, at Dodger Stadium in Los Angeles, USA, where the band, led at that time by Felipe Staiti, enlisted various guest musicians to fill in for Cantero as lead vocalist. The same approach was used for their performance at the National Grape Harvest Festival (Fiesta Nacional de la Vendimia) on February 17, 2023, marking the first time the group had performed in Argentina without their longtime vocalist.

Thus, in 2023, the band announced their return to the stage with a new permanent lineup, featuring Felipe Staiti on guitar and as lead vocalist, Jota Morelli on drums, Guillermo Vadalá on bass, Bosco Aguilar on keyboards, Adriana Rodriguez on backing vocals, and Damian Castroviejo on backing vocals and acoustic guitar. This same year, the band embarked on a tour of Spain, Italy, Puerto Rico, the United States, Colombia, Costa Rica, and Mexico.

In 2024, they performed 24 shows across the United States, Paraguay, Panama, Guatemala, El Salvador, Puerto Rico, Colombia, Ecuador, and Mexico.

In 2025, they embarked on the "Huevos Revueltos 2" tour with the legendary Spanish group Hombres G, playing in major cities across the United States, including the iconic Radio City Music Hall in New York, Miami's Kaseya Arena, and Crypto Arena in Los Angeles, among others.

On April 13, 2026, guitarist Felipe Staiti passed away at the age of 64 due to health complications. The Argentine musician and composer had been hospitalized at the Hospital Italiano in his hometown of Mendoza, Argentina, for a month after suffering from severe dehydration as a result of a bacterial infection he contracted following a tour in Mexico at the end of 2024.

== Band members ==
=== Current members ===
- Jota Morelli – drums, percussion (2009–present)
- Guillermo Vadalá – bass (2022–present)
- Bosco Aguilar – keyboards, piano (2022–present)
- Damian "Damiano" Castroviejo – backing vocals, acoustic guitar (2022–present)
- Adriana "Arita" Rodriguez – backing vocals (2022–present)

=== Former members ===
- Felipe Staiti – lead and backing vocals, guitars (1979–1989, 1992–2026; his death)
- Marciano Cantero – lead and backing vocals, bass, keyboards (1979–1989, 1992–2022; his death)
- Daniel Piccolo – drums, percussion (1979–1989, 1992–2009)
- Sergio Embrioni – lead and backing vocals, guitars (1984–1985; died 2011)
- Tito Dávila – keyboards, piano, backing vocals (1984–1989)

== Discography ==
=== Studio albums ===
- Los Enanitos Verdes (The Little Green Men, 1984, vinyl and cassette tape only, for Mordisco label)
- Contrareloj (Counterclockwise, 1986, their first album for Sony BMG)
- Habitaciones Extrañas (Strange Rooms, 1987)
- Carrousel (1988)
- Había una Vez (Once Upon a Time, 1989, last album for Sony BMG Argentina)
- Igual que Ayer (Just Like Yesterday, gold album, 1992, first album for EMI)
- Big Bang (1994, platinum album)
- Guerra Gaucha (Gaucho War, 1996)
- Planetario (Planetarium, 1997)
- Néctar (Nectar, 1999)
- Solo para Fanáticos (Only for Fanatics, 2001)
- Amores Lejanos (Distant Affairs, 2003)
- Pescado Original (Original Fish – a pun on the Spanish equivalent of Original Sin), 2006)
- Inéditos (2010)
- Tic Tac (2013)

=== Live albums ===
- Tracción Acústica (Acoustic Traction, 1998)
- En vivo (2004)
- Live At House of Blues, Sunset Strip (2011)
- Huevos revueltos (with Hombres G) (2018)

=== Compilation albums ===
- 20 Grandes Éxitos (20 greatest hits, 1995)
- Recupera tus Clásicos (2010)
