= Lora, Su Lira y Sus Rolas =

Studio album by Alex Lora
- Released: September 21, 1999
- Genre: Rock, Blues
- Length: 39:20
- Label: WEA
- Producer: Alex Lora

Alex Lora chronology
Fin de Siglo (1998)	Lora, Su Lira y Sus Rolas (1999)	Sinfónico (1999)

Lora, Su Lira y Sus Rolas (Lora, His Guitar And His Songs) (1999) is the fifteenth studio album by Mexican rock and blues singer Alex Lora and the first one solo, as a separate project of his band El Tri. The main single is Lora's signature song "Triste Canción" in a slower tempo and with a trio

== Reception ==
The AllMusic review by Heather Phares awarded the album 4 stars stating "Alex Lora's Lora, Su Lira Y Sus Rolas is the solo debut from El Tri's singer/songwriter. Over the album's 13 songs, Lora demonstrates the singing and playing skills that helped make El Tri one of the most important Latin rock acts. Tracks like "Palabras," "Que Gueva" and "Triste Cancion" are among Lora, Su Lira Y Sus Rolas' most memorable moments.".

Professional ratings
Review scores
Source	Rating
AllMusic	4/5 stars

== Track listing ==
All tracks by Alex Lora except where noted.

1. "Palabras" (Words) – 2:38
2. "Dos de Bastos" (Two of Clubs) – 2:41
3. "Canción de Cuna" (Lullaby) – 2:57
4. "Nuestros Impuestos" (Our Taxes) – 2:59
5. "Murmullo de Amor" (Love Whisper) – 3:39
6. "La Primera Piedra" (The First Stone) – 2:40
7. "Que Güeva" (Laziness) – 2:34
8. "El Mamey y el Ñero" (Lora, Horacio Reni) – 2:07
9. "La Bolsa" (The Stock Exchange) – 3:11
10. "Ya No le Metas" (Give The Thing a Rest) – 2:17
11. "Beto" – 4:22
12. "Ya Estamos Hartos" (We Had It) – 3:43
13. "Triste Canción" (Sad Song) – 3:25

== Personnel ==
- Alex Lora – guitar, vocals, producer, mixing
- Rafael Salgado – harmonic

=== Guest musicians ===
- In "Triste Canción"
  - Bernardino Maldonado – maracas, lead vocals
  - Daniel Torres – backing vocals, harmony
  - Alejandro Domínguez – requinto

=== Technical ===
- Chela Lora – concept
- Fernando Aceves – photography
- Jean B. Smith – engineer, mixing
- Mark Chaleki – mastering
- Juan Carlos Paz y Puente – A&R
- Maricela Valencia – coordination
