= Cuando Tú No Estás =

Studio album by El Tri
- Released: May 27, 1997
- Studio: Indigo Ranch Studios (Malibu, California)
- Genre: Rock, blues
- Length: 45:07
- Label: WEA
- Producer: Alex Lora

El Tri chronology
Hoyos en la Bolsa (1996)	Cuando Tú No Estás (1997)	Fin de Siglo (1998)

Cuando tú no estás (When You Aren't Here) (1997) is the fourteenth studio album by Mexican rock and blues band El Tri. The lead single is "Virgen Morena," a hymn to the Mary Virgin with the cooperation of Carlos Santana. In "Muchacho Chicho," renowned Mexican comedian Victor Trujillo gives an introduction as his main character Brozo. The album was nominated for a Grammy Award in the Best Latin Rock album category.

== Track listing ==
All tracks by Alex Lora except where noted.

1. "Virgen Morena" (Brown-Skinned Virgin) – 4:34
2. "Correteando el Bolillo" (Chasing the bolillo) (Lora, Eduardo Toral) – 3:30
3. "Parece Fácil" (It Looks Easy) – 4:33
4. "Epidemia" (Epidemic) – 4:27
5. "Pastillas de Rocanrol" (Rock`n Roll pills) – 3:27
6. "El Ritmo del Mundo" (The world's rhythm) – 3:25
7. "Cuando Tú No Estás" (When You Aren't Here) – 4:23
8. "Copias Piratas" (Fake Copies) – 4:10
9. "Echa Tus Broncas a la Basura" (Throw Your Problems Away) – 3:15
10. "Esclavo del Rocanrol" (Slave of Rock`n Roll) (Rodrigo Levario, Lora) – 3:14
11. "De Todos Modos Juan Te Llamas" (You Are Named John Anyway) – 3:40
12. "El Muchacho Chicho" (The Neat Guy) – 5:05

== Personnel ==
- Alex Lora – bass, vocals, producer, mixing
- Rafael Salgado – harmonic
- Eduardo Chico – guitar
- Oscar Zarate – guitar
- Chela Lora – backing vocals
- Ramon Perez – drums
- Lalo Toral – piano
- Ronnie Laws – saxophone
- Román Martínez – art direction, design
- Jorge Romero – art direction, design, photography
- Carlos Santana – guitar in "Virgen Morena"
- Ricardo Trabulsi – photography
- Victor Trujillo – introduction in "Muchacho Chicho"
- Chuck Johnson – mixing, mixing assistant, percussion
- Rob Agnello – assistant engineer
- Richard Kaplan – engineer, mixing
- Jim Gaines - producer
