= Una Leyenda Viva Llamada El Tri =

Studio album by El Tri
- Released: 1990
- Recorded: Los Angeles, California
- Genres: Rock, blues
- Length: 35:33
- Label: WEA Latina
- Producer: Alex Lora

El Tri chronology
21 Años Después, Alex Lora y El Tri (1989)	Una Leyenda Viva Llamada El Tri (1990)	En Vivo!!! Y a Todo Calor (1991)

Una Leyenda Viva Llamada El Tri (A Living Legend Called El Tri) (1990) is the seventh studio album by Mexican rock and blues band El Tri.

It was recorded in Los Angeles, California.

== Track listing ==
All tracks by Alex Lora except where noted.

1. "Casa, Comida y Sustento" (_{Home, Food and Wellbeing}) – 3:21
2. "Viejas de Vecindad (_{Neighborhood's Old Hags}) – 4:34
3. "Otra Garrapata Más (_{One More Tick}) – 5:10
4. "El Desempleado (_{The Unemployed}) – 3:49
5. "Me Voy a Suicidar (_{I'm Going To Commit Suicide}) – 3:35
6. "Rie (_{Laugh}) – 2:56
7. "Millones de Niños (_{Millions of Kids}) – 6:35
8. "Como Una Lombriz (_{Like a Worm}) – 3:28
9. "Nuestra Realidad (_{Our Reality}) – 2:10

== Personnel ==
- Alex Lora – guitar, vocals
- Rafael Salgado – harmonic
- Sergio Mancera – electric and rhythm guitar
- Pedro Martínez – drums
- Ruben Soriano – bass
