= Zbigniew Paleta =

Polish musician

Zbigniew Paleta (born 1940) is a Polish violinist and composer for telenovelas and the Cinema of Mexico. He is the father of actresses Ludwika and Dominika Paleta. They relocated to Mexico City in 1980.

== Awards ==
- Ariel Award in 1998 by the Mexican Academy of Film
  - Musical score for Libre de culpas.
  - Best song for Libre de culpas

== Albums ==
- EL tri (Sinfónico, celebrando los 30 años de El tri) , primer violin
- El Tri MTV Unplugged, violin

== Telenovelas ==
- Prisionera de amor (1994)

== Films ==
=== Mexico ===
- Knórosov. El desciframiento de la escritura Maya (2000), original music
- Brisa de Navidad (1999), original music
- Al borde (1998), original music
- Libre de culpas (1996), original music
- 4 maneras de tapar un hoyo (1995), original music
- La otra familia (2011), original music

=== Poland ===
- Trzy kolory: Biały (1994), director
- Miroslava (1993), violin
