= El Tri (band) =

Mexican rock band

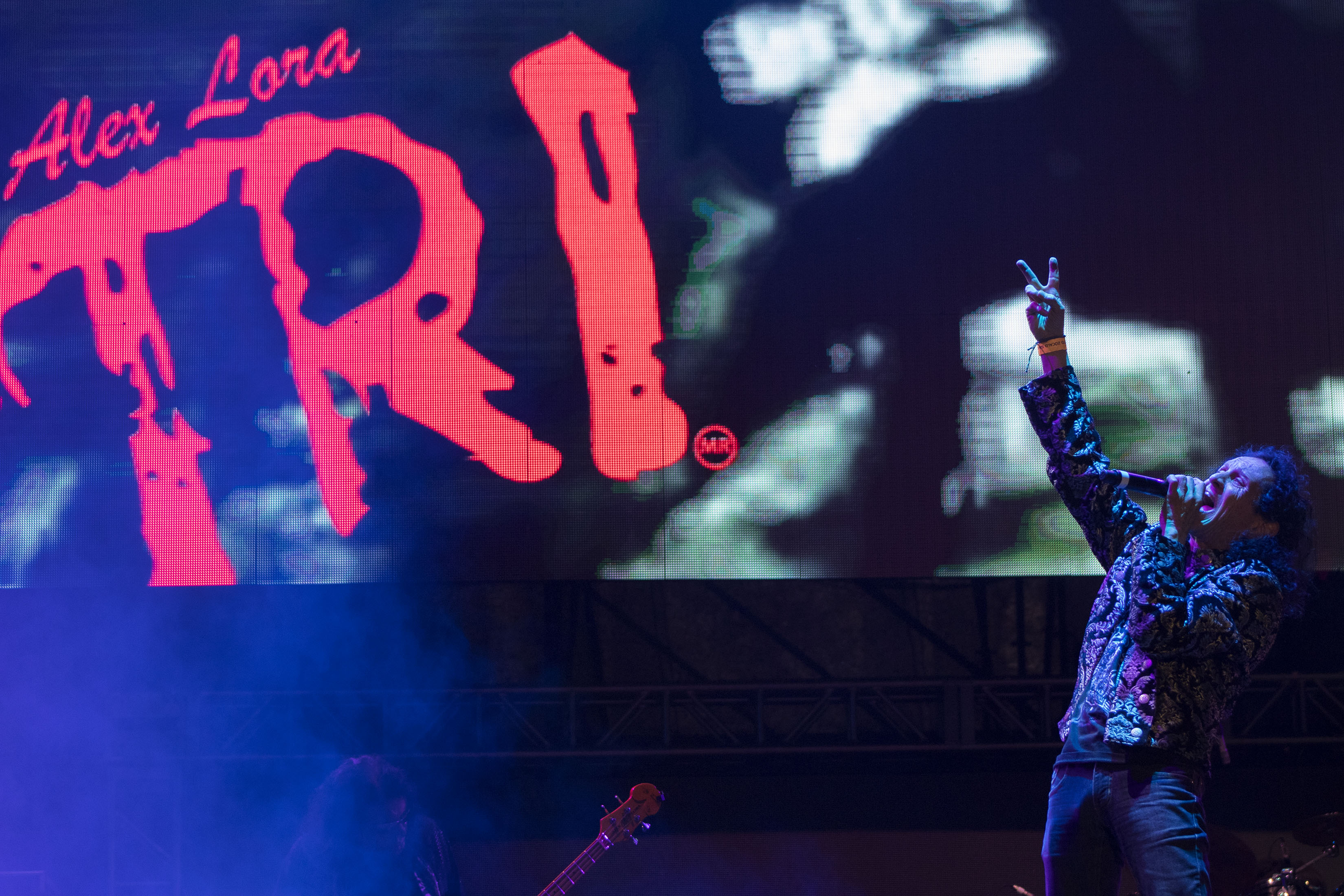

Background information
- Also known as: Three Souls in My Mind
- Origin: Mexico City, Mexico
- Genres: Rock, rock and roll, psychedelic rock, hard rock, acoustic rock, blues-rock, blues, latin rock, Rock en espanol
- Years active: 1968–present
- Labels: Discos Cisne/Raff, WEA International
- Members: Alex Lora; Chela Lora; Lalo Chico; Oscar Zarate; Charlie Valerio; Felipe Chacon; Lalo Toral; Rafael “Wea” Salgado; Alejandro Alvarez; Antonio “El Danzante” Alba
- Website: www.eltri.com.mx

El Tri is a Mexican rock band from Mexico City fronted by Alex Lora. It is a spinoff of Three Souls in My Mind, formed in 1968. The group is regarded as influential in the development of Mexican rock music.

Over the years, El Tri's sound has touched on several different styles including rock, psychedelic rock, hard rock, acoustic rock, blues-rock, and blues. The group has enjoyed moderate success, garnering numerous gold-certified albums in Mexico.

== Band history ==
=== Three Souls in My Mind ===
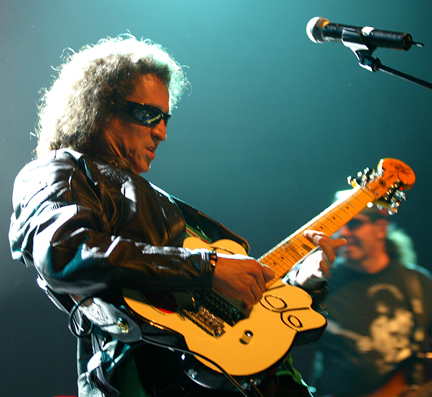
Band founder Alex Lora, on stage with the band in 2006

The name "Three Souls in My Mind", now commonly noted by its initials TSIMM, was initially chosen as a nod towards conventions for long band names in rock and roll. Originally composed of Alejandro Lora on bass, Memo Berea on rhythm guitar and vocals, Ernesto de Leon on lead guitar, and Carlos Hauptvogel on drums, the band has been accompanied on some albums by Arturo Labastida on saxophone and Carlos Martinez on trumpet. Sergio Mancera also played guitar on some albums. They performed their first public engagement in October, 1968, and released 15 albums on the RAFF record label before officially changing their name and lineup in 1985.

As rock in Mexico was originally seen as 'inauthentic' when sung in Spanish, Three Souls mostly sang covers of American rock and blues songs in English. However, at the Festival de Avándaro, often called "Mexico's Woodstock," they crossed over, singing first in English, then in Spanish. From then on they recorded primarily in Spanish, writing most of their own songs. When asked why they switched to Spanish, Lora replied that it was important for the audience to understand the messages of the songs. Though Three Souls had a popular following among the younger generation while singing in English, changing attitudes toward rock pushed the band to perform in the 'hoyos fonquis,' where the lower classes held semi-chaotic rock shows. Singing in his original language and for a new, energetic, young, and discontented audience, Lora's songs began reflecting more of the reality of the daily lives of average Mexicans.

=== El Tri ===
In 1985, TSIMM split into Three Souls in My Mind with Carlos Hauptvogel and El Tri with Alex Lora. Under Hauptvogel, TSIMM went to record four studio albums and one compilation with considerable success, and under Lora El Tri became the first Mexican rock band to have a Gold certified record with their album Simplemente, which contained their first single, "Triste Canción" and a cover version of "Metro Balderas", originally by Rockdrigo González. In 1986 their song "Vicioso del rocanrol" became a hit in Peru, topping radio charts, which opened the way to two concerts in Plaza de Toros Acho, where they returned a year later for a tour in seven cities. In the same year the band was invited by Miguel Ríos to participate in the First Iberoamerican Rock Encounter at the Sports Palace of Madrid, Spain, alongside the most representative bands of countries like Chile, Venezuela, Argentina and Spain. By 1992, the band's albums were consistently going Gold in Mexico. In 1993, the band released one of their signature songs, Pobre Soñador, which became their breakout song for the South American market, specifically Argentina. The promotional video gained heavy rotation on the music channels.

The United States has also been an important part of their career, since they have had many concerts in New York City, Chicago, Houston, and all around the state of California, such as in San Francisco at The Fillmore, and in the city of Los Angeles, in venues such as Los Angeles Memorial Sports Arena, The Olympic Auditorium, Pico Rivera, The Palace, The Hollywood Palladium, and The Verizon Wireless Amphitheater. In New York City they sold out two consecutive concerts at the Roseland Ballroom. In 2003, they were nominated for "Best Album" at the Latin Grammy Awards, broadcast from Miami.

In 2004, Los Angeles Times writer Marla Dickerson noted that the band had "legions of loyal fans" and had "sold tens of millions of albums in Latin America", but that in spite of their success they lost their recording contract because their record label could not compete with counterfeiters.

== Themes ==
El Tri's songs cover a wide variety of subjects. Many songs reflect the personal experiences of founder Alex Lora, but frequently topics for songs are suggested by fans. In an interview with Hispanic music website batanga.com in 2006, Alex Lora said, "the fans, they tell me, 'Hey, write the song of the Pope! Hey, write the song of Che Guevara! Write the song of truck drivers, write the song of taxi drivers, of how it would be if Mexico won the soccer World Cup, write the song of prostitutes...'" and he complies, so that their audience may "feel they wrote it themselves".

Overall, the band is known for a left-wing political stance and a critical perspective of the Partido Revolucionario Institucional, which has been featured on many of its songs and albums. In spite of their political protests, El Tri maintains a steadfast loyalty to Mexico.

== Intellectual Property ==
Lora actively defends his intellectual property in the band's name. In 2017, TV network Televisa attempted to use "El Tri" as branding for its 2018 World Cup coverage in Mexico. El Tri is the standard fan nickname for "El Tricolor", which refers both to the three colors (green, white, and red) of the Mexican flag and the national team's first colours. Lora won an injunction through the Mexican federal courts preventing Televisa from using it for their commercial advantage, and asserting his ownership of the trademark.

Confusingly, it was incorrectly reported in 2023 that Lora had sued the Federación Mexicana de Fútbol (FMF) over the use of the term "El Tri" to refer to the Mexican national football team. Instead of "suing", Lora's legal team had applied to the Instituto Mexicano de la Propiedad Industrial, Mexico's industrial property agency, under an administrative trademark dispute process, to declare that Lora was indeed the trademark's owner. The FMF publicly acknowledged on Telegram that it had no legal dispute with Lora, and further stated that El Tri was not a trademark registered by the FMF.

In 2023 Lora’s wife and manager, Chela Lora, issued a statement reiterating that Lora holds the exclusive global trademark for the name, acknowledging the historical dispute with Televisa and others.

== Legacy ==
The 2008 Lonely Planet guide to Mexico calls El Tri "the grandfathers of Mexican rock." 2006's Rock en Español characterizes them as "Mexico's quintessential working-class rock outfit." They have been described in press as "Mexico's answer to the Rolling Stones": "Ancient, raunchy, but still hugely popular."

== Discography ==
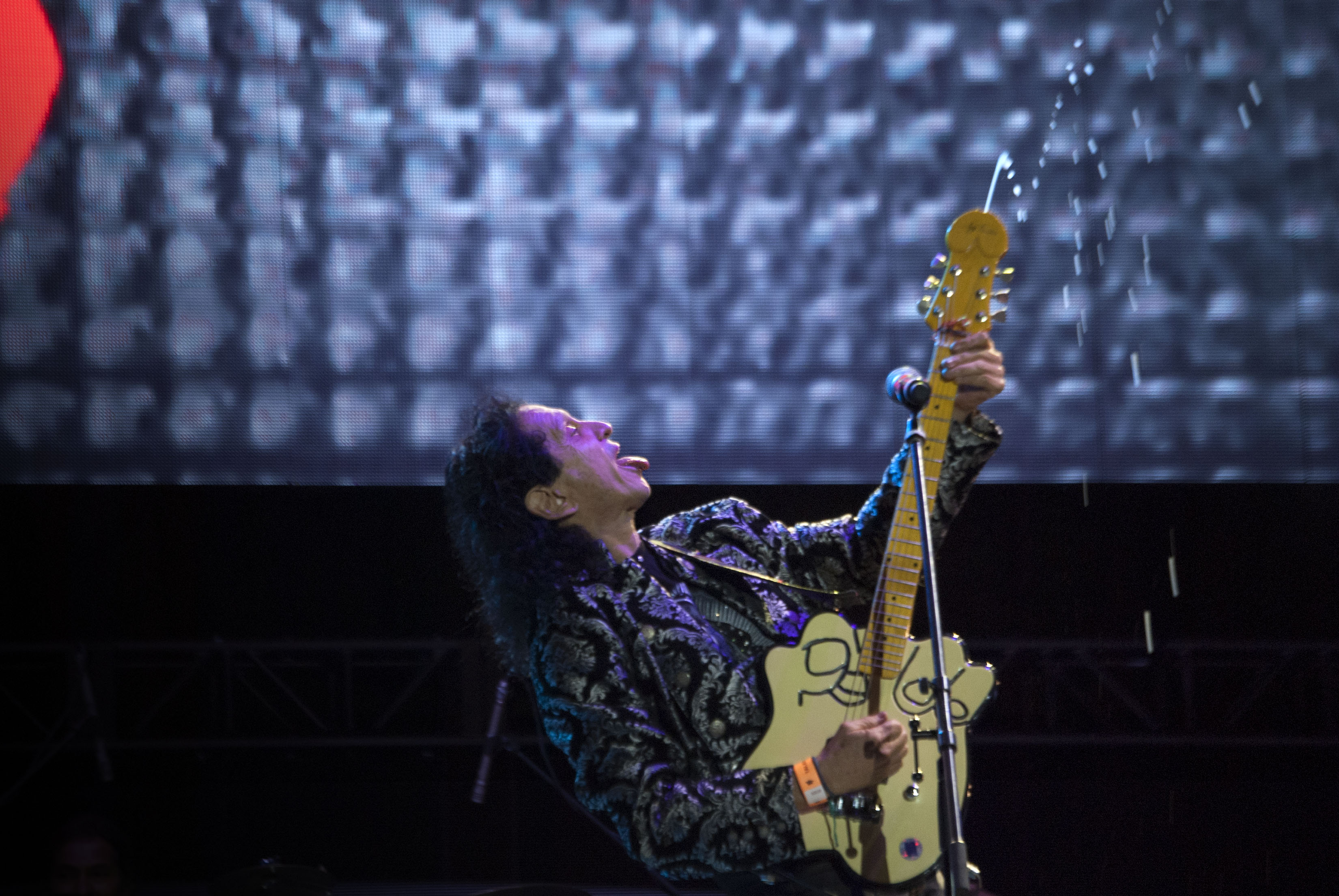
2017

Three Souls In My Mind / El Tri

- Abuelo / Me La He Pasado Divagando (1970) Demo

1 Three Souls In My Mind (1970) Renamed Colección Avandaro 1 Versiones en Inglés

2 Three Souls In My Mind II (1971) Renamed Colección Avandaro 2 Versiones en Inglés

3 Three Souls In My Mind III (1975) Renamed Oye Cantinero

4 Chavo de Onda (1976) Renamed Adicto al Rock'n'Roll/Three Souls Boogie

5 Es lo Mejor (1977)

6 No Hay quinto Malo (1978) Renamed La Devaluación

7 Reclusorio Oriente (En Vivo) (1978)

8 Qué Rico Diablo (1979) Renamed Oye Diablo

9 El Blues del Eje Vial (1979)

10 Bellas de Noche (1980)

11 D'Mentes (1981)

12 Viejas Rolas de Rock (1982) Renamed Ron & Roll

13 Renovación Moral (1983)

14 Simplemente (1985)

15 Hecho en México (1986)

16 El Niño Sin Amor (1987)

17 Otra Tocada Mas (1988)

18 En Vivo!!! En la Cárcel de Santa Martha (1989)

19 21 Años Después, Alex Lora y El Tri (1989)

20 Una Leyenda Viva Llamada El Tri (1990)

21 En Vivo!!! Y a Todo Calor (1991)

22 Indocumentado (1992)

23 25 Años (1993)

24 Una Rola Para los Minusvalidos (1994)

25 Un Cuarto de Siglo (En Vivo) (1995)

26 Hoyos en la Bolsa (1996)

27 Cuando Tú No Estás (1997)

28 Fin de Siglo (1998)

29 Sinfonico (En Vivo) (1999)

30 Lora, Su Lira y Sus Rolas (1999)

31 No Podemos Volar (2000)

32 Sinfónico II (Compilation: The Themes with Symphonic Orchestra) (2001)

33 No Te Olvides de la Banda (2002)

34 Esclavo Del Rocanrol (ODS Compilation: Themes and Interviews) (2003)

35 Alex Lora: 35 Años y lo Que le Falta Todavía (En Vivo) (2004)

36 Unplugged (En Vivo) (2004)

37 Más Allá del Bien y el Mal (2005)

38 En Directo Desde el Otro Lado (En Vivo) (2006)

39 A Talonear (2007)

40 Nada que Perder (2008)

41 De El Three A El Tri (Compilation: 2008 Versions of Tracks)

42 4 Decadas (En Vivo) (2009)

43 Libertad Incondicional]] (En Vivo 2011)

44 Ojo por ojo (2013)

45 45 Años (En Vivo) (2014)

46 Sinfónico III (En Vivo) (2015)

47 Nacimos Para Rodar (2017)

=== Compilation albums ===
- 15 Exitos Three Souls In My Mind (1982)
- Tributo (1998)
- Los Número Uno (2003)
- Tributo (Banda) (2003)
