= Fin de Siglo =

Studio album by El Tri
- Released: Sep 22, 1998
- Genre: Rock, Blues
- Length: 56:18
- Label: WEA
- Producer: Alex Lora, Jim Gaines

El Tri chronology
Cuando Tú No Estás (1997)	Fin de Siglo (1998)	Lora, Su Lira y Sus Rolas (1999)

Fin de Siglo (End of Century) (1998) is the fifteenth studio album by Mexican rock and blues band El Tri. The most successful single was "Nostalgia", a song about the generational circle completing with the end of century. The band counts with the participation of famous singer-songwriter and producer Andrés Calamaro.

The album was nominated for the Grammy Award for Best Latin Rock/Alternative Performance.

== Track listing ==
All tracks by Alex Lora except where noted.

1. "Todo Me Sale Mal" (Everything I Do Comes Out Wrong) – 3:42
2. "Nostalgia" – 4:27
3. "El Voceador" (The Newspaper Vendor) – 4:22
4. "El Futuro del Mundo" (The Future of the World) – 5:13
5. "Quién Da Un Peso Por Mis Sueños" (Who Gives a Dime for My Dreams) (Armando Manzanero) – 3:06
6. "Cásate o Muérete" (Marry or Die) – 5:45
7. "Gandalla" (Swine) – 2:42
8. "El Blues del Taxista" (The Cabdriver's Blues) – 3:14
9. "El Viagra" – 3:32
10. "No Hay Pedo" (Slang for "No Problem") – 2:32
11. "Amarga Navidad" (Bitter Christmas) – 5:23
12. "Todo Se Vale" (Everything Goes) (Lora, Carlos Carvajal) – 4:54
13. "Cotorreando Con la Banda" (Chatting Up with the Band) – 4:18
14. "Razas Gemelas" (Twin Races) (Lora, Eduardo Chico) – 3:08

== Personnel ==
- Alex Lora – bass, vocals, producer, mixing
- Rafael Salgado – harmonic
- Eduardo Chico – guitar
- Oscar Zarate – guitar
- Chela Lora – backing vocals, concept, vocals in "Gandalla"
- Lalo Toral – piano
- Ramon Perez – drums
- Sergio Rivero – photography
- Andres Calamaro – vocals in "Casate o Muerete"

=== Technical personnel ===
- John Hendrickson – mixing, mixing assistant, percussion
- Jean B. Smith – engineer, mixing
- Juan Carlos Paz y Puente – A&R
- Maricela Valencia – Coordination
