= Hecho en México (El Tri album) =

Studio album by El Tri
- Released: 1985
- Genre: Rock
- Length: 29:01
- Label: WEA International
- Producer: Alex Lora

El Tri chronology
Simplemente (1984)	Hecho en México (1985)	El Niño Sin Amor (1986)

Hecho en México (1985) (Made in Mexico) is the second studio album by Mexican Rock'n roll band El Tri.

== Track listing ==
1. "Hasta Que el Cuerpo Aguante" (_{Until The Body Holds On}) (Alex Lora, Sergio Mancera) – 2:05
2. "La Balada" (_{The Ballad}) (Lora, Mancera) – 4:21
3. "Era Un Mar" (_{It Was A Sea}) (Lora, Mancera) – 4:11
4. "Mente Rockera" (_{Rocking Mind}) (Lora) – 4:14
5. "Nunca Digas Que No" (_{Never Say No}) (Lora) – 5:11
6. "Enciende el Cerebro" (_{Turn On The Brain}) (Lora) – 3:20
7. "Una y Otra Vez" (_{Over And Over}) (Limón, Lora) – 2:34
8. "F.Z. 10" (Cruz, Lora) – 3:05

== Personnel ==
- Alex Lora – guitar, vocals
- Rafael Salgado – harmonic
- Sergio Mancera – electric & rhythm guitar
- Arturo Labastida – sax
- Mariano Soto – drums
