= Marciano Cantero =

Argentine musician (1960–2022)

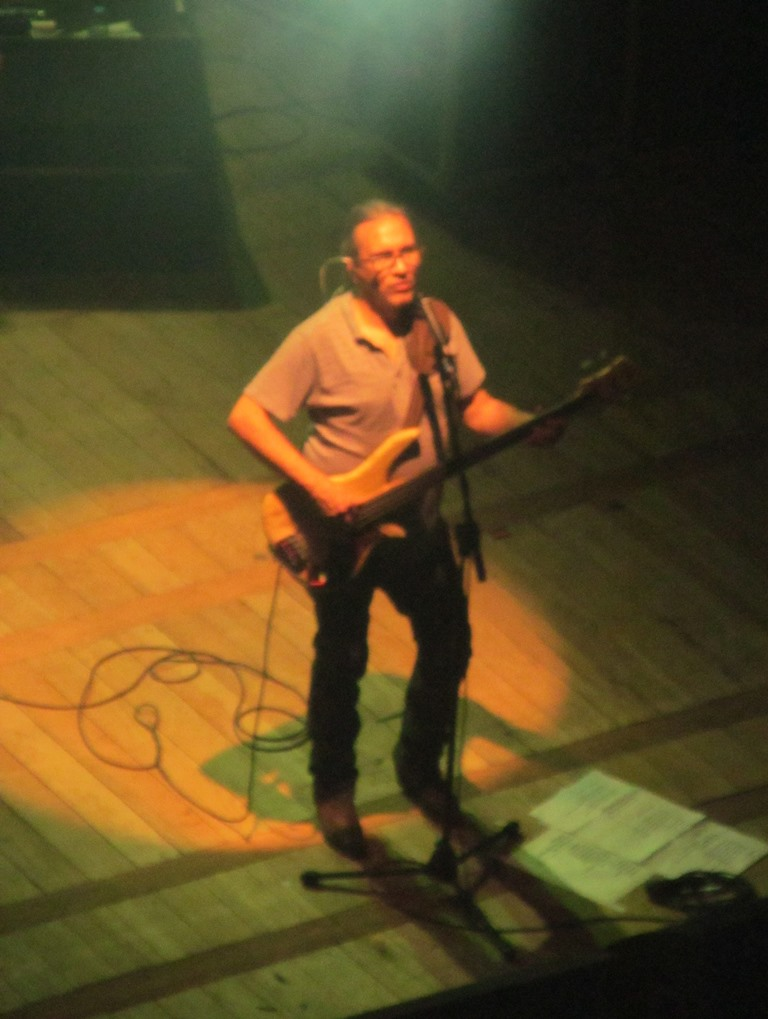
- Cantero performing

Background information
- Born: Horacio Eduardo Cantero Hernández; 25 August 1960; Mendoza, Argentina
- Died: 8 September 2022 (aged 62) Mendoza, Argentina
- Genres: Rock en español
- Occupation: Musician
- Instruments: Vocals; bass; keyboards
- Years active: 1979–2022
- Label: Universal Latino

Marciano Cantero (born Horacio Eduardo Cantero Hernández, 25 August 1960 – 8 September 2022) was an Argentine musician. He was the lead singer and bassist of Enanitos Verdes, an Argentine pop/rock band.

== Biography ==
Cantero was nine when he first heard the Beatles and The Beach Boys, which he credits as one of his most important influences in his music. Cantero bought a bass guitar that was on sale with his savings, and started to practice with the instrument, helped by his older brother. After graduating high school, his father bought him a brand new bass guitar. He also started attending concerts in the underground circuit during the civil military dictatorship of Argentina.

In 1979, he joined Felipe Staiti and Daniel Piccolo to form Enanitos Verdes (lit. "Little Green Dwarves", but more accurately considered equivalent to the phrase "Little Green Men"); they struggled at first, but eventually became idols in Mendoza. They later moved to Buenos Aires, where they also struggled performing in bars and clubs before recording their first album. After a label change, the Enanitos began their internationalization with CBS Argentina and became famous around Latin America.

In 1990, Cantero started his solo career, recording Luna Nueva (1990) and Beat Club (1991). After that Marciano recorded numerous albums with Enanitos Verdes as well as releasing a Greatest Hits compilation in 1995, a Live CD in 2005, and their newest album titled Pescado Original in 2006 which includes the hit Mariposas.

He lived in Hermosillo, Sonora, Mexico. In 2022, he returned to his birthplace, Mendoza, where he lived until his death.

== Illness and death ==
On 5 September 2022, he was hospitalized due to kidney illness. A surgery was performed, one kidney and part of his spleen were removed. He died three days later, on 8 September 2022, at the age of 62.

== Collaborations ==
- 1995: composed the song "Siempre te amé", for Andrés de León.
- 2001: collaborated as a lead singer on the song "El último adiós", of Rostros Ocultos.
- 2002: co-wrote with Coti Sorokin his song "Volando".
- 2008: composed and sang together with Vanaz, on the song "Extraño sabor".
- 2009: collaborated on the song "Pasando galaxias", de Hugo Bistolfi.
- 2010: participated on the song "Que cante la vida" in aid of the victims of an earthquake in Chile, together with Luis Fonsi, Alex Ubago, Ricardo Montaner, Franco de Vita, among others.
- 2010: participated on "Hipnotika" of A.B. Quintanilla III, DJ Kaneand Voltio.
- 2010: sang "Adivinaré" with Los Rancheros.
- 2016: collaborated as a lead singer and bassist on the song "Puentes De Papel" of Argentine musician Damián Gaume together with Joaquín Franco (Adicta).
- 2019: co-wrote with Bad Bunny and J Balvin the song "UN PESO" for the album Oasis.
