= 25 Años (El Tri album) =

Studio album by El Tri
- Released: 1993
- Recorded: July 1992 (Mexico City)
- Genre: Rock, blues
- Length: 36:23
- Label: WEA
- Producer: Alex Lora

El Tri chronology
Indocumentado (1992)	25 Años (1993)	Una Rola Para los Minusvalidos (1994)

25 Años (25 Years) (1993) is the tenth studio album by Mexican rock and blues band El Tri. It was released in cassette and compact disc format by WEA Latina in 1993.

The album was recorded at two studios: Indigo Ranch in Malibu, California, United States, and Kay-Nah in Mexico City, Mexico.

The name is a reference to the duration of the career of Alex Lora who started playing in 1968 with the past incarnation of the band known as Three Souls in My Mind.

Following the release of the album 25 Años in 1993, El Tri performed concerts throughout Mexico. In the same year, Alex Lora published a book titled Lora, Vida y Rock and Roll.

In 1994, Felipe Souza left the band after moving to New York City, United States. He was replaced by guitarist Oscar Zarate, who joined in April of the same year.

The most remarkable song of the album is the single "Pobre Soñador" a romantic hymn.

== Compact disc format ==
All tracks are written by Alex Lora, except where noted.

No.	Title	Writer(s)	English translation	Length
1.	"Chilango Incomprendido"		Misunderstood Chilango	2:56
2.	"Pobre Soñador"	Lora, Felipe Souza	Poor Dreamer	3:53
3.	"El Rey"		The King	4:22
4.	"Dónde Quedó la Bolita"	Lora, Pedro Martínez	Where Did The Little Ball End Up	3:24
5.	"Negro Como Tu Conciencia"		Black Like Your Conscience	3:38
6.	"Tómate la Foto"	Lora, Souza	Take The Picture	3:50
7.	"El Dueño del Mundo"		The Owner of The World	3:26
8.	"Mi Chava No Comprende"		My Girl Doesn't Understand	4:22
9.	"Libertad Bajo Fianza"	Lora, Souza	Out on Bail	3:42
10.	"El Hablador"	Garcia, Lora, Souza	The Bragger	2:50

== Personnel ==
=== Musicians ===
- Alex Lora – guitar, arranger, vocals, producer, mixing, artistic producer
- Rafael Salgado – harmonic
- Felipe Souza – electric & rhythm guitar, mixing, backing vocals
- Eduardo Chico – guitar
- Pedro Martínez – drums, backing vocals
- Ruben Soriano – bass
- Chela DeLora – backing vocals

=== Technical ===
- Michael Hoffman – coordination, art coordinator
- Chuck Johnson – mixing, mixing assistant
- Richard Kaplan – engineer, mixing
- Alex Lora - production, mixing

=== Artistic staff ===
- Mauricio Abaroa - cover design
- Sergio Toporek - art work, digital photography, graphic design and photo retouching
- Kenneth Barzilai - photography
