= El Niño Sin Amor =

Niño Sin Amor

Studio album by El Tri
- Released: 1986
- Genres: Rock, Blues
- Length: 35:04
- Label: WEA Latina
- Producer: Alex Lora

El Tri chronology
Hecho en México (1985)	Niño Sin Amor (1986)	Otra Tocada Mas (1988)

Niño Sin Amor (The Child Without Love) (1986) is the third studio album by Mexican rock and blues band El Tri.

The name of the album is from the main single, which is the story of a homeless kid, reflecting the big problem of homeless population in Mexico.

Another important single of the album is "El Rock Nunca Muere" a cover of Hey Hey, My My (Into the Black) by Neil Young.

== Track listing ==
1. "El Rock Nunca Muere" (_{Rock Will Never Die}) (Neil Young) – 8:19
2. "Otro Pecado" (_{Another Sin}) (Alex Lora) – 3:53
3. "Déjalo Sangrar" (_{Let It Bleed}) (Lora) – 4:29
4. "Qué Tal Ayer" (_{How About Yesterday}) (Lora) – 3:37
5. "El Niño Sin Amor" (_{The Child Without Love}) (Lora) – 3:06
6. "Mujer Diabólica" (_{Evil Woman}) (Lora, Sergio Mancera) – 3:46
7. "No Preguntes Por Qué" (_{Don't Ask Why}) (Lora, Mancera) – 3:56
8. "Más Allá del Sol" (_{Beyond The Sun}) (Lora, Mancera) – 3:58

== Personnel ==
- Alex Lora – guitar, vocals
- Rafael Salgado – harmonic
- Sergio Mancera – electric & rhythm guitar
- Arturo Labastida – saxophone
- Mariano Soto – drums
