= Rockdrigo González =

Mexican singer-songwriter

Rodrigo González
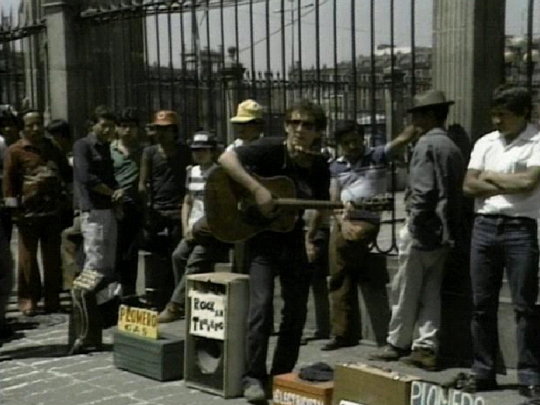
- Rockdrigo recording the music video for his song "Balada del asalariado" in 1985

Background information
- Also known as: Rockdrigo, El Profeta del Nopal
- Born: Rodrigo Eduardo González Guzmán; 25 December 1950; Tampico, Tamaulipas, Mexico
- Died: 19 September 1985 (aged 34) Mexico City, Mexico
- Genres: Folk, rock, blues
- Occupation: Singer-songwriter
- Instruments: Vocals, guitar, harmonica
- Years active: 1979–1985
- Label: Ediciones Pentagrama
- Formerly of: Movimiento Rupestre, Javier Bátiz
- Website: rockdrigo.com.mx

Rodrigo González (25 December 1950 – 19 September 1985), better known as Rockdrigo or El profeta del nopal ("The Nopal Prophet"), was a Mexican singer-songwriter. He died at age 35 with his girlfriend, Francoise Bardinet, when the apartment building in which he was living collapsed in the Mexico City earthquake of 19 September 1985. His early death made him a legend in Mexican rock.

== Biography ==
Rodrigo was born in Tampico, Tamaulipas. He studied psychology for a brief time at the Universidad Veracruzana in Xalapa before moving to Mexico City in 1977 with the desire to make music.

He arrived to the capital and began playing in bars and cafés. At first, he survived by singing covers in the streets of the city "in the English style." Over time, he began to create an oeuvre from his experiences on the streets.

The lyrics of Rockdrigo mixed the urban lifestyle with the troubles of the urban poor, and found many listeners among students. His songs could also be regarded as tender, for instance, "Metro Balderas," the ballad about a man who had lost his lover, and ends up hijacking a subway train.

In the early 1980s, he and other musicians including Rafael Catana, Jaime Lopez, and Roberto Ponce founded the La Liga de Musicos Errantes y Cantantes Rupestres (The League of Wandering Musicians and Prehistoric Cavemen Singers), which became known as the Movimiento Rupestre, a folk music scene that strongly influenced Mexican rock for the next ten years or so. Their music was similar to the Nueva canción movement in protesting social conditions, but unlike Nueva canción, they used street slang in their lyrics, were not overtly political, and drew on U.S. folk music instead of traditional Mexican instruments and sounds. Rockdrigo wrote the manifesto for the group.

In 1983, novelist José Agustín said that Rockdrigo had "achieved what is, for me, an extraordinary accomplishment: making Spanish sound perfect, truly natural in rock'n'roll....From the beginning I thought that Rodrigo González was our version of Bob Dylan with a sense of humor."

== Death ==
At the time of his death, Rockdrigo was living in an apartment in the Unidad Tlatelolco, which was devastated by the 1985 earthquake. After his death musicians would gather at the Metro Balderas station on 19 September to commemorate him and the earthquake and sing his songs.

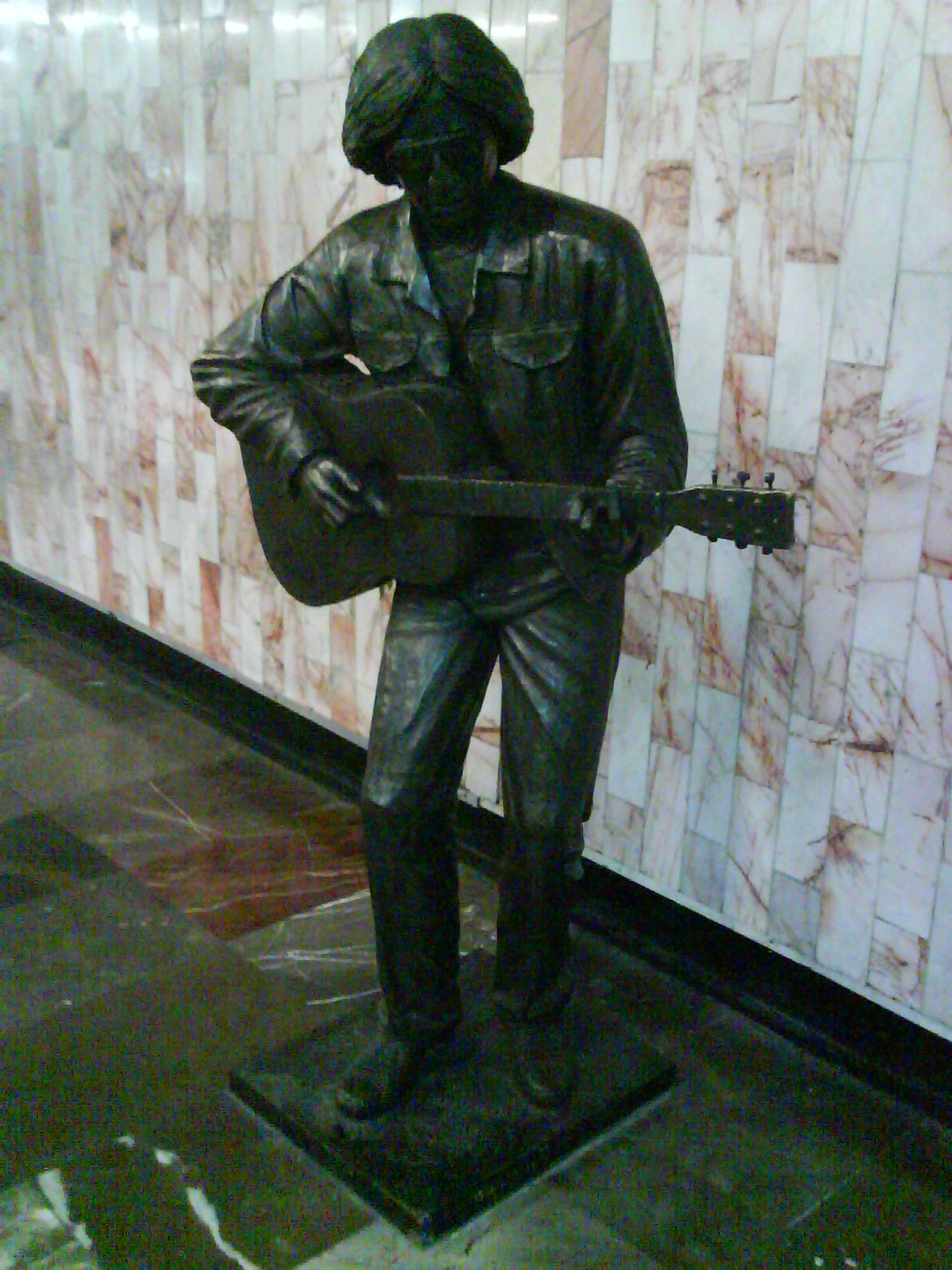
Statue of Rockdrigo at the Balderas metro station, photographed in 2012

His daughter, Amandititita, survived and later became a cumbia singer and songwriter. In 2011, she and others unveiled a statue of Rockdrigo at the Metro Balderas station.

== Music ==
As of 2007 there were four collections of his music:

- Hurbanistorias (Urban stories, 1983), a self-made record

Posthumous:

- El profeta del nopal (The Nopal Prophet)
- No estoy loco (I'm not Crazy)
- Aventuras en el DF (Adventures in DF)

== Films ==
- No tuvo tiempo: La Urbanistoria de Rockdrigo González by Rafael Montero
- Un toke de roc by Sergio García Michel
- Por qué no me las prestas? by Sergio García Michel
- ¿Cómo ves? by Paul Leduc
