= Una Rola Para los Minusvalidos =

Studio album by El Tri
- Released: 1994
- Genre: Rock, blues
- Length: 45:07
- Label: WEA
- Producer: Alex Lora

El Tri chronology
25 Años (1993)	Una Rola Para los Minusvalidos (1994)	Un Cuarto de Siglo (1995)

Una Rola Para los Minusvalidos (A Song For The Handicapped) (1994) is the eleventh studio album by Mexican rock-blues band El Tri.

== Track listing ==
All tracks by Alex Lora except where noted.

1. "Todo es Materia" (_{Everything Is Material}) – 3:50
2. "Perdedor" (_{Loser}) – 3:56
3. "Trabaja Niño, Trabaja" (_{Work, Child, Work}) (Lora, Pedro Martinez) – 6:21
4. "Revolución '94" (_{Revolution}) – 4:43
5. "La Puerta Falsa" (_{The False Door}) – 4:06
6. "Los Minusválidos" (_{The Handicapped}) (Chicho Mora, Lora, Martinez, Rafael Salgado, Ruben Soriano, Felipe Souza) – 3:14
7. "La Raza Más Chida" (_{The Coolest Race}) – 4:08
8. "Las Piedras Rodantes" (_{The Rolling Stones}) – 3:18
9. "Siempre He Sido Banda" (_{I Have Always Been Band}) – 3:00
10. "Con la Cola Entre las Patas" (_{With The Tail Between The Legs}) (Lora, Martinez) – 4:22
11. "No Me Hagan Perder el Tiempo" (_{Don't Make Me Waste My Time}) – 4:02

== Personnel ==
- Alex Lora – guitar, vocals, producer, mixing
- Rafael Salgado – harmonic
- Eduardo Chico – guitar
- Pedro Martínez – drums, backing vocals
- Ruben Soriano – bass
- Chela DeLora – backing vocals

=== Guest musicians ===
- Felipe Souza – electric & rhythm guitar, mixing
- Lalo Toral – piano
- Oscar Zarate – guitar

=== Technical ===
- Chuck Johnson – mixing, mixing assistant
- Richard Kaplan – engineer, mixing

== Sales ==
Region	Certification	Certified units/sales
Mexico	—	100,000
