= 21 Años Después, Alex Lora y El Tri =

21 Años Después

Studio album by El Tri
- Released: 1989
- Genres: rock, Blues
- Length: 42:05
- Label: WEA
- Producer: Alex Lora

El Tri chronology
En Vivo!!! En la Cárcel de Santa Martha (1989)	21 Años Después (1989)	Una Leyenda Viva Llamada El Tri (1990)

21 Años Después (21 Years Later) (1989) is the sixth studio album by Mexican rock and blues band El Tri.

The title is a reference to the 21 years of career of Alex Lora since the creation of Three Souls on my Mind.

The album includes "María Sabina", which became one of the band's most popular songs.

== Track listing ==
All tracks are written by Alex Lora, except where extrad.

No.	Title	English translation	Length
1.	"María Sabina"		5:15
2.	"Puros Changos"	Only Monkees	4:26
3.	"El As No Conocido"	The Unknown Ace	3:14
4.	"Difícil"	Difficult	2:49
5.	"Tren del Infierno"	Hell's Train	4:54
6.	"Un Día en la Vida"	A Day in Life	5:09
7.	"Encuentros Cercanos del Tercer Sexo"	Close Encounters of The Third Sex	5:29
8.	"Maldito Sistema"	Cursed System	3:25
9.	"Que Reventón"	What a Party	3:16
10.	"La Fuerza del Amor"	The Force of Love	2:51

== Personnel ==
- Alex Lora – guitar, vocals
- Rafael Salgado – harmonic
- Sergio Mancera – electric & rhythm guitar
- Hector "Virgo" Zenil;– drums
- Ruben Soriano – bass
