= Simplemente (El Tri album) =

Studio album by El Tri
- Released: 1984
- Genre: Rock
- Length: 33:50
- Label: WEA International

El Tri chronology
Simplemente (1984)	Hecho en México (1985)

Simplemente (Simply) (1984) is the first studio album by the band originally known as Three Souls in My Mind and the first one as El Tri. The name comes as a direct reference from the way the fans called the band Tri, which is the way Three sounds in Spanish, hence Simply The word Tri.

The album was well received with "Triste Cancion" becoming a hymn in Latin rock and by far the most recognized song by the band, just like "Metro Balderas" and "Vicioso" received big success as singles.

In the song San Juanico 84 Alex Lora makes a salute industrial disaster caused by a massive series of explosions at a liquid petroleum gas tank farm in San Juanico, Mexico on November 19, 1984; this being one more of the songs dedicated to social reality, a characteristic in the songs of the band.

== Track listing ==
1. "Sópleme usted primero" (You Blow me First) (Alex Lora, Sergio Mancera) - 4:25
2. "San Juanico" (Lora) - 5:15
3. "Vicioso" (Vicious) (Lora, Mancera) - 2:19
4. "Juanita" (Lora, Mancera, Mariano Soto) - 3:50
5. "Triste canción" (Sad Song) (Lora) - 5:25
6. "Agua, mi niño (La curva)" (Water, my Child (La Curva)) (Lora, Mancera) - 3:26
7. "Violencia, drogas y sexo" (Violence, Drugs and Sex) (Lora, Guillermo Briseño) - 3:40
8. "Metro Balderas" (Balderas Subway) (Rodrigo González) - 5:30

== Personnel ==
- Alex Lora – guitar, vocals
- Rafael Salgado – harmonic
- Sergio Mancera – electric & rhythm guitar
- Arturo Labastida – sax
- Mariano Soto – drums

== Certification ==
Region	Certification	Certified units/sales
Mexico (AMPROFON)	2× Gold	200,000^{‡}
^{‡} Sales+streaming figures based on certification alone.
