= Álex Lora =

Mexican musician and composer

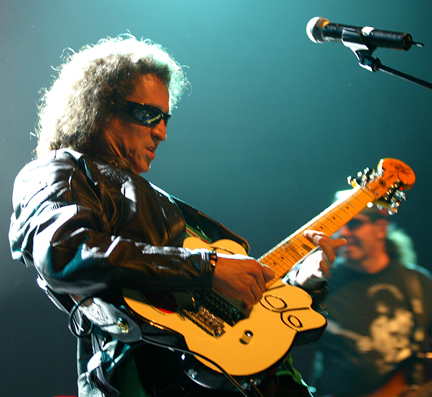
- Lora with El Tri in 2006

Background information
- Born: José Alejandro Lora Serna; December 2, 1952 (age 73); Puebla, Mexico
- Genres: Rock en Español, hard rock, psychedelic rock
- Years active: 1968–present
- Labels: Comrock, Warner Music, Universal Music
- Website: www.eltri.com.mx

José Alejandro Lora Serna (born December 2, 1952), better known by his stage name Álex Lora, is a Mexican musician and composer. He has been the frontman of the Mexican rock band El Tri for over 50 years, since October 12 of 1968 when he founded among Carlos Hauptvogel and Guillermo Berea the Three souls in my mind band, but because of differences with Carlos, Alex decided to create a new band called El Tri, as the followers of Three souls in my mind used to call them. In 2006, Hispanic music website batanga.com characterized Lora as "legendary", noting that among his honors and awards he has been named a "Distinguished Pueblan Citizen" in his home city and has been given the keys to the city in Miami, as well as having a day (November 10, 2002) and a statue in his hometown Tequela, Nayarit.

== Discography ==
- Lora, Su Lira y Sus Rolas (1998),
- Alex Lora: Esclavo del Rocanrol (2003)

== Filmography ==
- 2003: Alex Lora: Esclavo del Rocanrol (documentary) Details at IMDb
- 2008: The Dead Sleep Easy
- 2009: "Nikté" (animated) as Chamán Chanek

== See also ==
- Statue of Álex Lora
