= Love, Peace & Poetry – Vol.7 Mexican =

Love, Peace & Poetry: Mexican Psychedelic Music

Compilation album by Various artists
- Released: October 2003
- Genre: Garage rock, psychedelic rock
- Label: QDK Media; Normal

Love, Peace & Poetry chronology
Love, Peace & Poetry - Vol.6 Brazilian (2003)	Love, Peace & Poetry: Mexican Psychedelic Music (2003)	Love, Peace & Poetry - Vol.8 African (2004)

Professional ratings
Review scores
Source	Rating
Allmusic	link

Love, Peace & Poetry – Vol.7 Mexico is the seventh volume in the Love, Peace & Poetry series released by QDK Media and Normal Records in 2003. This volume explores obscuro garage rock and psychedelic rock bands from Mexico.

== Track listing ==
1. "Lost in my World" (Los Dug Dug's) – 4:06
2. "Hang Out" (Kaleidoscope) – 2:17
3. "Roaming" (La Fachada De Piedra) – 3:07
4. "El Ruido del Silencio" (El Tarro De Mostaza) – 3:05
5. "Touch Me" (La Vida) – 2:34
6. "Joven Amante" (La Libre Expression) – 2:49
7. "Behind a Young Girl Smile" (The Flying Carpets) – 2:22
8. "En Medio de la Lluvia" (La Revolucion De Emiliano Zapata) – 7:58
9. "It's You" (The Spiders) – 4:03
10. "Lenon Blues" (Three Souls In My Mind) – 2:46
11. "Tommy Lyz" (Toncho Pilatos) – 3:49
12. "I'm Dying" (Renaissance) – 3:35
13. "The Train" (Ernan Roch) – 4:15
14. "Nada Nos Detendra" (Groupo Ciruela) – 3:13
15. "Cuando Era Niño" (Los Ovnis) – 2:07
16. "The World Is a Bomb" (Survival) – 2:26
17. "Volvere" (Nahuatl) – 3:32
