= Zerfas =

Zerfas may refer to:

- Zerfas (band), of the Zerfas brothers
- Zerfas (album) 1973

== See also ==
- Zerfaß
