= Love, Peace & Poetry – Vol.1 American =

Love, Peace & Poetry: American Psychedelic Bands

Compilation album by Various artists
- Released: January 13, 1998
- Genre: Garage rock, psychedelic rock
- Length: 52:56
- Label: QDK Media

Love, Peace & Poetry chronology
Love, Peace & Poetry: American Psychedelic Bands (1998)	Love, Peace & Poetry - Vol.2 Latin (1998)

Professional ratings
Review scores
Source	Rating
Allmusic	link

Love, Peace & Poetry – Vol.1 American is the first volume in the Love, Peace & Poetry series released by QDK Media in 1998. This volume explores obscuro garage rock and psychedelic rock bands from America.

== Track listing ==
1. "Shades of Blue" (Darius) – 2:15
2. "Danny's Song" (New Tweedy Brothers) – 2:50
3. "White Panther" (Arcesia) – 2:34
4. "Ride a Rainbow" (Victoria) – 2:46
5. "Song of a Gypsy" (Damon) – 2:25
6. "Slave Ship" (Jungle) – 5:23
7. "Colors" (Hunger) – 2:03
8. "Graveyard" (Trizo 50) – 4:45
9. "Nam Myo Renge Kyo" (Music Emporium) – 2:35
10. "I'll Be on the Inside, If I Can" (The Brain Police) – 3:25
11. "Oceans of Fantasy" (Michael Angelo) – 3:01
12. "I Need It Higher" (Zerfas) – 4:44
13. "There Was a Time" (Lazy Smoke) – 1:57
14. "Mister Man" (Hickory Wind) – 3:27
15. "Dark Thoughts" (The New Dawn) – 3:00
16. "Wild Eyes" (Sidetrack) – 2:10
17. "Reflections on a Warm Day" (Patron Saints) – 3:36
