= Fusiles =

Fusiles, also known as arte de fusil (literally "art of the projection") was a shift in the Mexican music industry towards more exact covers of foreign rock. This shift focused on performing covers in English as opposed to performing the same covers in Spanish. Mexican cover bands had been popular since the early 1950s, and more and more of these bands, such as the popular Los Dug Dug's, included both English and Spanish translations on their records. This focus on the authenticity of the music often led to cover bands to create very exact interpretations of foreign rock. As one critic, José Agustín, said certain songs even “exceeded the original versions”. Although this movement was very popular, due to high costs, access to original British records or live performances of British artists were difficult to come by. Thus, these cover bands were often the only connection to the global music industry that Mexico had.
