= Alberto Blanco =

Alberto Blanco may refer to:

- Alberto Blanco (footballer) (born 1978), Panamanian footballer
- Alberto Blanco (poet) (born 1951), Mexican poet
- Alberto Blanco (weightlifter) (born 1950), Cuban weightlifter
