= Love, Peace & Poetry – Vol.2 Latin =

Love, Peace & Poetry: Latin American Psychedelic Bands

Compilation album by Various artists
- Released: January 13, 1998
- Genre: Latin rock, psychedelic rock
- Label: QDK Media

Love, Peace & Poetry chronology
Love, Peace & Poetry - Vol.1 American (1998)	Love, Peace & Poetry: Latin American Psychedelic Bands (1998)	Love, Peace & Poetry - Vol.3 Asian (2000)

Professional ratings
Review scores
Source	Rating
Allmusic	link

Love, Peace & Poetry – Vol.2 Latin is the second volume in the Love, Peace & Poetry series released by QDK Media in 1998. This volume explores obscuro garage rock and psychedelic rock bands from Latin America.

== Track listing ==
1. "Tema de Pototo" (Almendra)
2. "Someday" (Laghonia)
3. "I'm So Glad" (Traffic Sound)
4. "Colours" (Kaleidoscope)
5. "Tomorrow" (We All Together)
6. "Cuando Llegue el Año 2000" (Los Gatos)
7. "Yellow Moon" (Kissing Spell)
8. "Virgin" (Traffic Sound)
9. "Obertura" (Almendra)
10. "Trouble Child" (Laghonia)
11. "El Evangelio de la Gente Sola" (Los Mac's)
12. "Oscar Wilde" (Los Vidrios Quebrados)
13. "Super-God" (Som Imaginario)
14. "People" (Ladies WC)
15. "Lem - Ed - Ecalg" (Modulo 1000)
16. "Degrees" (Los Mac's)
17. "Betty Boom - Little Monster - Doggie and Peggie at the Witch's Castle" (The (St. Thomas) Pepper Smelter)
18. "It's Over" (Los Dug Dug's)
