= Toncho =

Toncho (Bulgarian: Тончо) is a masculine given name. Notable people with the name include:

- Toncho Todorov (born 1958), Bulgarian gymnast
- Toncho Tonchev, Bulgarian boxer

== See also ==
- Toncho Pilatos, 1970s Mexican rock band
