= Love, Peace & Poetry – Vol.4 Japanese =

Love, Peace & Poetry: Japanese Psychedelic Music

Compilation album by Various artists
- Released: November 27, 2001
- Genre: Garage rock, psychedelic rock
- Length: 57:52
- Label: QDK Media; Normal

Love, Peace & Poetry chronology
Love, Peace & Poetry - Vol.3 Asian (2000)	Love, Peace & Poetry: Japanese Psychedelic Music (2001)	Love, Peace & Poetry - Vol.5 British (2001)

Professional ratings
Review scores
Source	Rating
Allmusic	link
ToxicUniverse	link

Love, Peace & Poetry - Vol.4 Japan is the fourth volume in the Love, Peace & Poetry series released by QDK Media and Normal Records in 2001. This volume explores obscuro garage rock and psychedelic rock bands from Japan.

== Track listing ==
1. "Happenings Theme" (The Happenings Four) – 1:01
2. "Liver Juice Vending Machine" (Foodbrain) – 2:39
3. "Tomorrow's Child" (Apryl Fool) – 4:19
4. "Run and Hide" (Speed, Glue & Shinki) – 4:50
5. "Hidariashi no Otoko" (Yuya Uchida & The Flowers) – 4:39
6. "Brane Baster" (Blues Creation) – 2:02
7. "Freedom of a Mad Paper Lantern" (Shinki Chen) – 3:08
8. "Gloomy Flower" (Jacks) – 3:17
9. "Kimi Ha Darenanda" (Tokedashita Garasubako) – 3:00
10. "You All Should Think More" (Justin Heathcliff) – 2:23
11. "Keep It Cool" (Speed, Glue & Shinki) – 4:19
12. "The Lost Mother Land, Pt. 1" (Apryl Fool) – 5:41
13. "A White Dove in Disguise" (Masahiko Sato) – 2:03
14. "Kirikyogen" (Kuni Kawachi & Friends) – 5:06
15. "Asamade Matenai" (The Mops) – 3:08
16. "Koishite Aishite" (The Beavers) – 3:15
17. "I Want You" (The Happenings) – 3:02
