= Love, Peace & Poetry – Vol.3 Asian =

Love, Peace & Poetry: Asian Psychedelic Music

Compilation album by Various artists
- Released: 2000
- Genre: Garage rock, psychedelic rock
- Length: 56:01
- Label: QDK Media; Normal

Love, Peace & Poetry chronology
Love, Peace & Poetry - Vol.2 Latin (1998)	Love, Peace & Poetry: Asian Psychedelic Music (2000)	Love, Peace & Poetry - Vol.4 Japanese (2001)

Professional ratings
Review scores
Source	Rating
Allmusic	link

Love, Peace & Poetry – Vol.3 Asian is the third volume in the Love, Peace & Poetry series released by QDK Media and Normal Records in 2000. This volume explores obscuro garage rock and psychedelic rock bands from Asia, specifically from Hong Kong, Turkey, Korea, Japan, Cambodia, India and Singapore.

== Track listing ==
1. "Magic Colours" (Teddy Robin and the Playboys) – 3:28
2. "Istemem" (Erkin Koray) – 2:50
3. "It Was Probably Late Summer" (Sanullim) – 5:19
  1. 아마 늦은 여름이었을거야
4. "You Know What I Mean" (Justin Heathcliff) – 2:16
5. "Derule" (Barış Manço) – 2:10
6. "A2" (Ros Sereysothea backed by an unknown band, from "Cambodian Rocks" compilation) – 3:43
7. "Blind Bird" (The Mops) – 2:54
8. "Greasy Heart" (Yuya Uchida & The Flowers) – 3:49
9. "Gönül Savretke Sabreyle" (3 Hür-El) – 4:19
10. "Simla Beat Theme" (The Fentones) – 4:11
11. "Katip Arzvhalim Yaz Yare Böyle" (Mogollar) – 3:29
12. "Voice from the Inner Soul" (Confusions) – 4:44
13. "26 Miles" (The Quests) – 2:53
14. "Korean Title A2" (Jung Hyun and the Men) – 9:56
  1. "Beautiful Country" (아름다운 강산)
