= Love, Peace & Poetry – Vol.5 British =

Love, Peace & Poetry: British Psychedelic Music

Compilation album by Various artists
- Released: November 27, 2001
- Genre: Psychedelic rock
- Label: QDK Media; Normal

Love, Peace & Poetry chronology
Love, Peace & Poetry - Vol.4 Japanese (2001)	Love, Peace & Poetry: British Psychedelic Music (2001)	Love, Peace & Poetry - Vol.6 Brazilian (2003)

Professional ratings
Review scores
Source	Rating
Allmusic	link

Love, Peace & Poetry – Vol.5 British is the fourth volume in the Love, Peace & Poetry series released by QDK Media and Normal Records in 2001. This volume explores little known garage rock and psychedelic rock bands from Britain.

== Track listing ==
1. "Memories" (Red Dirt) – 2:05
2. "Magazine Woman" (Gary Walker & The Rain) – 4:59
3. "Felix" (Andwella's Dream) – 4:18
4. "Maypole" (Dark) – 5:02
5. "Now I Know" (Dogfeet) – 3:08
6. "There Are No Greater Heroes" (Tony, Caro and John) – 3:44
7. "Comets" (Pussy) – 4:14
8. "Reach Out" (Candida Pax) – 3:32
9. "Mandolin Man" (Mark Fry) – 3:54
10. "On a Meadow-Lea" (Motherlight) – 3:34
11. "Yesterday" (Lightyears Away (Astral Navigations)) – 2:40
12. "Three Days After Death, Pt. 1" (Bodkin) – 4:34
13. "The Dreamer Flies Back" (Forever Amber) – 3:24
14. "Telephone" (Oliver) – 3:29
15. "Harvington Hall" (Parameter) – 2:42
