= Zerfas (album) =

Studio album by Zerfas
- Released: 1973
- Recorded: 700 West Recording Studio, Indiana
- Genre: Psychedelic rock
- Length: 41:00
- Label: 700 West. (Unauthorized re-release by Radioactive Records.)
- Producer: David Zerfas

Professional ratings
Review scores
Source	Rating
Allmusic	4/5 stars
The Lama Reviews	10/10

Zerfas is the only studio album by the psychedelic rock group Zerfas. It was released in 1973 on 700 West. The album had limited commercial success, but found a much larger audience in the early 2000s when the track "I Need it Higher" was featured on the American edition of the Love, Peace, and Poetry psychedelic music compilations.

The record was given an official deluxe reissue on LP in 1994 using the master tapes as source. 500 copies were pressed, but due to a pressing defect, only 375 were put into circulation. An official CD has never been released, although the album has been bootlegged from vinyl and released on the Radioactive, Phoenix, and Lion labels.

Zerfas' story is told on the 700 West website.

== Track listing ==
=== Chapter One ===
1. "You Never Win" (David Zerfas and Herman Zerfas)
2. "The Sweetest Part" (David Zerfas and Mark Tribby)
3. "I Don't Understand" (David Zerfas, Herman Zerfas and John McCormick)
4. "I Need It Higher" (David Zerfas)

=== Chapter Two ===
1. "Stoney Wellitz" (David Zerfas and Herman Zerfas)
2. "Hope" (Bill Rice and Herman Zerfas)
3. "Fool's Parade" (David Zerfas and Herman Zerfas)
4. "The Piper" (David Zerfas and Steve Newhold)

== Personnel ==
- Dave Zerfas – drums, percussion, background vocals, lead vocals, guitar
- Herman Zerfas – keyboards, background vocals, guitar, bass, lead vocals
- Mark Tribby – bass, guitar, background vocals, lead vocals
- Bo Gooliak – bass
- Bill Rice – bass, background vocals
- Steve Newbold – bass, guitar, background vocals
- M. J. Whittemore, Jr. – elks horn

== Bibliography ==
- Joynson, Vernon (2010). Fuzz Acid and Flowers Revisited (Expanded ed.). Great Britain: Borderline Productions. ISBN 978-1-899855-18-6.
- Lundborg, Patrick (2010). The Acid Archives: A Guide To Underground Sounds 1965-1982 (2nd ed.). Stockholm: Lysergia. ISBN 978-91-976523-1-5.
