= Love, Peace & Poetry – Vol.6 Brazilian =

Love, Peace & Poetry: Brazilian Psychedelic Music

Compilation album by Various artists
- Released: January 28, 2003
- Genres: Garage rock, psychedelic rock
- Labels: QDK Media; Normal
- Producer: Thomas Hartlage

Love, Peace & Poetry chronology
Love, Peace & Poetry - Vol.5 British (2001)	Love, Peace & Poetry: Brazilian Psychedelic Music (2003)	Love, Peace & Poetry – Vol.7 Mexican (2003)

Professional ratings
Review scores
Source	Rating
Allmusic	4/5 stars
Indieville	88%

Love, Peace & Poetry - Vol. 6 Brazil is the sixth volume in the Love, Peace & Poetry series released by QDK Media and Normal Records in 2003. This volume explores obscuro garage rock and psychedelic rock bands from Brazil.

== Track listing ==
1. "E Assim Falava Mefistófeles" (O Bando) – 3:43
2. "Tão Longe de Mim" (Os Brazões) – 2:10
3. "Razão de Existir" (A Bolha) – 3:37
4. "Voando" (Liverpool) – 2:09
5. "Inferno No Mundo" (Bango) – 2:03
6. "Birds in My Tree" (The Buttons) – 2:53
7. "Lunatica" (Assim Assado) – 3:28
8. "I Need You" (O Terço) – 2:23
9. "Trilha Antiga" (Spectrum) – 3:18
10. "Animalia" (Módulo 1000) – 1:58
11. "Miragem" (Os Lobos) – 3:21
12. "Quero Companheira" (Rubinho e Mauro Assumpção, Mauro Assumpção) – 2:57
13. "Let's Go" (Sound Factory) – 2:32
14. "Lagoa das Lontras" (O Terço) – 3:22
15. "Mensageiro" (Paulo Bagunça) – 3:09
16. "Marácas de Fogo" (Lula Côrtes and Zé Ramalho) – 2:28
17. "Revolução Orgânica" (Marcos Valle) – 2:58
18. "Quero Você, Você" (Hugo Filho) – 3:12
19. "Fidelidade" (Marconi Notaro) – 3:19
