= Love, Peace & Poetry – Vol.8 African =

Love, Peace & Poetry: African Psychedelic Music

Compilation album by Various artists
- Released: October 19, 2004
- Genres: Garage rock, psychedelic rock
- Labels: QDK Media; Normal

Love, Peace & Poetry chronology
Love, Peace & Poetry - Vol.7 Mexican (2003)	Love, Peace & Poetry: African Psychedelic Music (2004)	Love, Peace & Poetry - Vol.9 Turkish (2005)

Love, Peace & Poetry – Vol.8 African is the eighth volume in the Love, Peace & Poetry series released by QDK Media and Normal Records in 2004. This volume explores obscuro garage rock and psychedelic rock bands from Africa.

== Track listing ==
1. "The Circus" (McCully Workshop Inc.) – 4:02
2. "A Madman's Cry" (Otis Waygood) – 4:23
3. "Time to Face the Sun" (Blo) – 4:04
4. "Moving Away" (Abstract Truth) – 3:55
5. "1999" (Freedoms Children) – 4:05
6. "Elegy" (Suck) – 3:00
7. "Valley of Sadness" (Third Eye) – 3:05
8. "Gentle Beasts, Pt. 1" (Freedoms Children) – 1:55
9. "The Seventh House" (Mack Sigis) – 2:54
10. "The Higher I Go" (Otis Waygood) – 1:42
11. "Love Is the Only Way" (Rikki Ililonga) – 4:16
12. "Oh Ye Ye" (Chrissy Zebby Tembo, Ngozi Family) – 3:00
13. "Weatherman" (Quentin E. Klopjaeger) – 2:47
14. "Original Man" (Abstract Truth) – 3:38
15. "Kafkasque" (Freedoms Children) – 2:43
16. "Young Folk and Old Folk" (Third Eye) – 3:31
17. "Gbe Mi Lo" (Ofege) – 4:14
