= La Comuna =

Mexican rock band

- Origin: Mexico City, Mexico
- Genre: Psychedelic rock
- Years active: 1969 - 1975
- Label: Peerless Records
- Spinoffs: Las Plumas Atomicas
- Past members: Jimmy Vernon; Sergio Romay; Alberto Darszon; Emilio Aboumrad; Alberto Blanco; Paty Mackenzie; Gustavo Martínez Mekler

La Comuna (The Commune) was a Mexican rock band. It was part of the counterculture movement known as La Onda (The Wave).

== Origins and influences ==
Influenced by classical music, jazz and rock acts like Jefferson Airplane, Pink Floyd and Procol Harum, La Comuna was formed in 1969 in Mexico City. After playing at local parties they switched to perform concerts, playing original materials and singing in both English and Spanish. They won second place at the Festival Pop del Naranjazo, losing the first prize to jazz-rock band Tinta Blanca.

== Recording and touring ==
La Comuna signed a record contract in 1971 with Peerless Records and recorded an EP. A single of their song "No hay mañana" (There is no tomorrow) was also produced. They often toured with other La Onda bands like Three Souls in my Mind and El Amor. They were one of the few La Onda music acts that were allowed to perform at El Palacio de Bellas Artes (The Palace of Fine Arts).

== Collapse ==
Due to their radical views of society and their own strict counterculture values, they refused to appear six times in a row on the Telesistema Mexicano program Siempre en Domingo, hosted by Raúl Velasco. This caused Peerless to cancel their projected LP, and the band was soon without a record contract. They disbanded in 1975 due to lack of work opportunities caused by the Avandarazo phenomenon and the end of the hippie trend worldwide.

== Brief comeback ==
In the 1980s, Blanco, Mekler and Darszon formed Las Plumas Atómicas playing in cultural hubs around Mexico City. They resumed to play from time to time until the mid-2000s.

== Discography ==
- La Comuna, extended play, Peerlees 1971
- "No hay mañana", single, Peerless 1971

== Notable members ==
- Alberto Blanco: Musician, chemist, painter and poet. Considered one of the greatest Mexican poets of the second half of the 20th century by intellectuals like Elena Poniatowska.
- Gustavo Martinez Meckler: Musician and physicist. Current professor at the prestigious UNAM.
- Alberto Darszon: Musician and biochemist. Professor at the UNAM and awarded in 2009 with the Premio Nacional de Ciencia, Mexico's top award for scientists.
