= Zerfaß =

Zerfaß is a German family name, derived from Servatius.

Those with the surname include:

- Julius Zerfaß (1886–1956), German journalist
- Dan Zerfaß (born 1968), German organist

== See also ==
- Zerfas (disambiguation)
- Surface (surname)
