= Osamu Kitajima =

Japanese musician

Osamu Kitajima 喜多嶋 修
- Also known as: Justin Heathcliff
- Born: Chigasaki, Kanagawa, Japan
- Genres: New-age; folk; jazz fusion; electronic
- Years active: 1960s–present
- Labels: Island Records; Alfa; East Quest Records; Cyber Octave; Mesa/Bluemoon
- Website: www.eastquest.com

Osamu Kitajima (喜多嶋 修), also known by the pseudonym Justin Heathcliff, is a Japanese musician, producer, composer, and multi-instrumentalist who is known for new-age music, as well as folk, jazz fusion and electronic music.

== History ==
After studying the classical guitar and the piano as a child, in the 1960s Kitajima was a member of his cousin Yūzō Kayama's band The Launchers. After graduating from Keio University, and already a successful composer of TV and advertising jingles, he moved for one year to the UK in 1971, which brought him in to contact with British folk and psychedelic rock. Inspired in particular by The Beatles, Tyrannosaurus Rex and Syd Barrett, he dubbed himself "Justin Heathcliff" (picked for its English-sounding quality) and issued his lone eponymous album. Released only in Japan, the album became highly prized in collector's circles for its good-natured idiosyncrasy and casual melodicism.

After this album, he dropped the pseudonym and in 1974 released his debut album, Benzaiten (Island Records), under his own name. This instrumental album was melodically rich and can be defined as a mix of prog and psychedelic folk with Japanese folk music and psychedelic pop. The album also featured Haruomi Hosono and it utilized various electronic equipment such as a synthesizer, rhythm machine, electronic drums, electric guitars, and electric bass.

In 1974, he moved to the Los Angeles area, USA, where he signed a contract with Island Records Later he opened the East Quest Studios there. In 1991, Kitajima released his critically acclaimed album Behind the Light in the USA (Higher Octave Music), again under his own name. In it, he blended elements of New Age and traditional Japanese music, e.g. he used the sounds of koto and shakuhachi.

Wishing to explore the expanding world of dance and electronica music, Kitajima began his collaboration with instrumentalist/composer/producer Chris Mancinelli. During the early 1990s the production team initiated a partnership by producing and arranging the albums of many artists in the Asian markets for Warner Bros, Sony Music, Toshiba-EMI, and Pony Canyon Records. These included remixes for the Warner Bros. release of Mari Henmi's "Mon Cheri Mari" and a highly revered re-mix of the all-time classic song "Sukiyaki" by Japanese legend Kyu Sakamoto for Sony Music. These collaborations lead to a record deal with the Virgin/CyberOctave label and the ground breaking release of Beyond the Circle. The guys also found time to create the underground smash Fabulous Breaker Boys techno/surf release which was a #1 seller on the now infamous Napster and mp3.com websites. Following this was a project recorded for Miles Copeland's Ark21/mondorhythmica label entitled Two Bridges Crossing (2004). This music was also featured on the label's acclaimed compilation series Zen and the Art of Chilling (2002). Copeland shuttered the record label but the project was later released independently.

Kitajima began to receive even wider interest in the West when the track "You Know What I Mean" was featured on the Asian volume of the Love, Peace & Poetry compilation series in 1999, and has since been reissued on CD. After releasing the album, Kitajima has continued to work under his own name. Now associated more closely with New Age music than pop, he currently resides and works in Los Angeles.

In 2000, he founded East Quest Records, Inc., a record company.

In 2004, he earned a doctorate in music therapy.

== Personal life ==
He married Yōko Naitō in 1970. They have three children; one of their daughters, Mai Kitajima, is an actress.

== Discography (selection) ==
- Justin Heathcliff – Justin Heathcliff (1971)
- Fumio & Osamu – Shinchuugoku (1972) (フミオ* & オサム* – 新中国)
- Benzaiten (1974) (弁才天)
- Osamu (1977) (オサム)
- Masterless Samurai (1978) (素浪人)
- Dragon King (1979)
- Face to Face (1983)
- The Source (1986)
- Passages (1987)
- In Minds Way (1987)
- FM Shrine (1987)
- California Roll (1988)
- Sweet Chaos (1990)
- Mandala (1991) (曼荼羅)
- Behind the Light (1992)
- Beyond the Circle (1996, EP)
- Breath of Jade (2001)
- Two Bridges Crossed (w/ Chris Mancinelli) (2004)
- The Sound of Angel (2004)
- Epitome (2009)
- The Sacred Land: NHK HD Documentary Soundtrack (2010)
- Over the Brink (2013)
- Torii In The Sea (2019)
- Around the Edges (2020)
- Sweet Chaos (2021)
- Sundry Spirits (2024)
