= Alberto Blanco (poet) =

Mexican poet

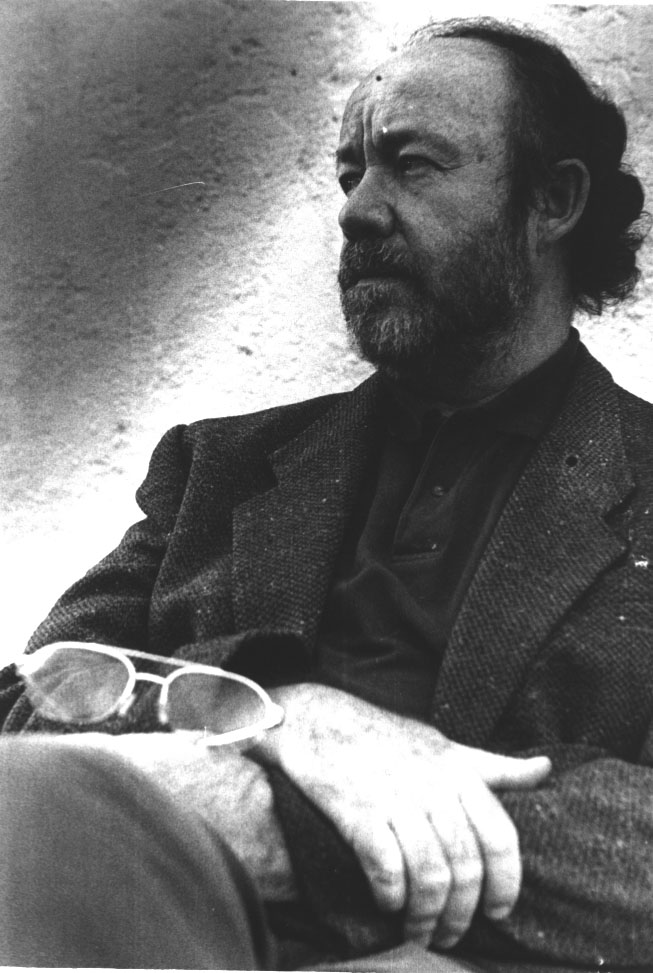
Alberto Blanco, Mexican Poet

Alberto Blanco (born February 18, 1951) is a Mexican poet. He has published twenty-six books of poetry and has also translated the work of other poets.

== Early life and education ==
Born in Mexico City, he spent his childhood and adolescence in that city, and he studied chemistry at the Universidad Iberoamericana and philosophy at the Universidad Nacional Autónoma de México. For two years, he pursued a master's degree in Asian Studies, specializing in China, at El Colegio de México.^{1}

== Poetry ==
Blanco was first published in a journal in 1970. He was co-editor and designer of the poetry journal El Zaguan (1975–1977), and a grant recipient of the Centro Mexicano de Escritores (Mexican Center of Writers, 1977), el Instituto Nacional de Bellas Artes (the National Institute of Fine Arts, 1980), and the Fondo Nacional para la Cultura y las Artes (National Fund for Culture and Arts, 1990). In 1991 he received a grant from the Fulbright Program as a poet-in-residence at the University of California, Irvine; and, in 1992, he was awarded a grant from the Rockefeller Foundation. He was admitted into the Sistema Nacional de Creadores (National System of Creative Artists) in 1994, for which he has also been a juror. In 2001 he received the Octavio Paz Grant for Poetry, and in 2008, he was awarded a grant from the Guggenheim Foundation. He remains a member of the Sistema Nacional de Creadores.

Blanco's literary output has been very abundant and varied, and he has undertaken three genres: first, poetry, followed by essays, and, finally, translations. He has published twenty-six books of poetry in Mexico and additional books in other countries; ten books of his translations of the work of other poets; and twelve story books for children, some of which have been illustrated by his wife Patricia Revah. His work has been translated into twenty languages, including English, French, German, Portuguese, Italian, Dutch, Swedish, Danish, Hungarian, Japanese, Romanian, Bulgarian, Zapotec, and Russian.^{2}

In 1997 he accepted a residency in Bellagio, Italy, funded by the Rockefeller Foundation; and in 2000 he was invited as a resident poet at the Poetry Center of the University of Arizona. He was also invited to inaugurate the program, "La Universidad de la Poesía" ("The University of Poetry"), in Chile, where he gave readings, lectures, and workshops in various cities in that country.

Blanco has been involved in many of the most important poetry festivals in the world and has given many courses, workshops, readings, and lectures in more than fifty universities in the United States as well as in France, Canada, Germany, Spain, Italy, Colombia, Ireland, El Salvador, Chile, Belgium, Sweden, Denmark, Iceland, Estonia, and Finland.

To date, he has published more than seventy books, along with twenty more of translations, anthologies, or illustrations as well as more than eight hundred publications in magazines, catalogs, newspapers, and literary supplements. More than 200 essays, reviews, and commentaries on his work have been published both in Mexico and other countries; more than sixty interviews with him have appeared. His poems are included in more than a hundred anthologies, have been studied in various master's and doctoral theses, and have been included in a dozen dictionaries and textbooks. His total publications exceed 1500.

In 1988 he received the Carlos Pellicer Poetry Prize for his book Cromos, and in 1989 the José Fuentes Mares National Prize for Literature for Song to the Shadow of the Animals, a book that unites his poems with drawings by Francisco Toledo. In 1996 Insects Also Are Perfect received honors from IBBY in the Netherlands. In 2002 he received the "Alfonso X (the Wise)" award for excellence in literary translation from San Diego State University in California.

There are five anthologies of his poems: Amanecer de los Sentidos, published by the National Council for Culture and the Arts in Mexico in 1993; Dawn of the Senses, a bilingual anthology that included a dozen translators, published by City Lights, in San Francisco, in 1995, with a second edition in 2013; De vierkantswrotel can de hemel, Gedichten, translated into Dutch by Bart Vonck and published by Wagner and Van Santen in the Netherlands, 2002; and A Cage of Transparent Words, edited by Paul B. Roth, translated by eight translators, and published by The Bitter Oleander Press of New York; and Hacia el mediodía, which was published in 2013 in Spain by Editorial Pre-Textos.

In 1998, El Corazon del Instante (The Heart of the Moment), a compilation of twelve volumes of poetry that included twenty-five years (1968–1993) of work was published in a series of major Mexican works; and in 2005 a second compilation of another twelve books of poetry entitled La Hora y la Neblina (The Hour and the Mist) was published in the same series by the same publisher (Fondo de la Cultura Economica).

In 2011, the Bitter Oleander Press published a bilingual edition of his book, Tras el Rayo, entitled Afterglow translated by Jennifer Rathbun. Also, in 2011, Blanco's first book of poetics (El llamado y el don (The Calling and the Gift) was published by AUIEO in Mexico City, who, in 2013, published the second volume of poetics, La poesía y el presente (Poetry and the Present). A third volume is expected in 2016.

== Visual arts ==
Blanco has collaborated with numerous painters, sculptors and photographers, and his essays on the visual arts are published in many catalogs and magazines. In 1998 they were collected in one volume: Las voces del ver (The Voices of Vision). This book served as a basis for a television series of programs with the same name which were shown on Mexican television. A new edition (800 pages), revised and augmented of his essays on visual arts, was published in 2012, entitled El eco de las formas (The Echo of Forms).

In fact, Alberto Blanco is well known as a visual artist; his collages have appeared in many books and journals, and his paintings have hung in national galleries. He has had several showings in California, and in 2007, exhibited 108 collages in the Estación Indianilla in Mexico City, along with recent sculptures by Leonora Carrington. Equally noteworthy are his artist's books which form part of important collections in various universities in the United States. In 2011, The Athenaeum in La Jolla, California, mounted a retrospective exhibit of forty years of Blanco's artist's books entitled "Visual Poetry/Poesía Visual." In 2015, the CECUT (Centro Cultural de Tijuana) presented a major retrospective exposition of his work in collage.

== Music ==
Furthermore, Blanco has been a songwriter, and he was the singer and keyboardist in the rock and jazz groups "La Comuna" ("The Commune") and "Las Plumas Atómicas" ("The Atomic Plumes"). His poetry dedicated to rock is collected in the book Paisajes en el oido (Earscapes), published by Aldus in 2012 ). He has a blog dedicated wholly to the poems in this book as well as to the musicians that inspired the poems.

== Academia ==
Although he has dedicated himself chiefly to the writing of poetry and has not embarked on an academic career (in Mexico he has never taught at any institution), he was a full-time professor for three years (1993–1996) in the Creative Writing Program at the University of Texas at El Paso. At the end of 1996, he returned with his family to Mexico City, but in 1998 and 1999, he was invited as a distinguished professor to San Diego State University in California. In 2007 he was awarded an endowed chair, the Knapp Chair, for a semester at the University of San Diego. In 2009 and 2010, Blanco taught courses in art at Middlebury College, and he was invited to teach literature courses at the University of California, San Diego (UCSD), in 2009 and 2010. He returned to Middlebury College in 2011, and since then, he has not accepted further teaching positions.

Blanco's most recent books of poetry are Poesia visual, Ediciones del Lirio y Conaculta, Mexico, 2015; and La raiz cuadrada del cielo, Universidad Autonoma de Nuevo León y Matadero, Mexico, 2016.

== Critical reception ==
Critical discussion and acclaim of Blanco's work abounds, both in Mexico and abroad. Regarding Dawn of the Senses, Mexican poet Jose Emilio Pacheco, in his introduction to the book, writes, "[Blanco] is someone in whom, as Henry James said, nothing is lost. Everything streams into his words, so many tributaries feed into the flow of his poetry. His knowledge of chemistry, his work as a visual artist and jazz musician, his grounding in Chinese literature and Zen Buddhism--all of these combine to give his poems a tone and perspective unlike any other Mexican poet."^{3} W.S Merwin concludes that, "Alberto Blanco's poems, over several decades, have revealed with precision and delicacy an original imaginative landscape and imagery that are at once intimate, spacious, and rooted in the rich ground of Mexican poetry…" ^{4} "Alberto Blanco is the master of bright, clear, and sudden awarenesses that are the flesh and light so special to his poetry…" observes Michael McClure.^{5}

Describing Blanco's work in A Cage of Transparent Words (2007), Gary Snyder writes:

This is a substantial volume, 140 pages of poems presented in both Spanish and English. It's a selection of Blanco's work from nine books and booklets, done by eight translators. The writing explores themes of reality and suffering. The first section contains surreal prose poems, followed by a section of modern lyrics and the style connects mysterious themes with a patient and observational tone.

Jerome Rothenberg has commented, "An increasingly significant voice in Mexican & Latin American poetry, Blanco crosses boundaries between poetry as such & his other works as musician, artist, essayist & translator."

== Notes ==
^{1}http://www.jornada.unam.mx/2007/11/18/index.php?section=opinion&article=a04a1cul (Some of the biographical information about Blanco comes from this first section of an interview in La Jornada, which is divided into four sections; the other three sections are listed below under "references." Biographical information is also available in the introductions to all of Blanco's books, listed below under "Selected Bibliography".)

^{2} Jose Vicente Anaya, Palabra Virtual: Entrevistas (Virtual Word: Interviews) (Mexico, Instituto Nacional de Bellas Artes y Literatura, 2007), p. 190.

^{3} Alberto Blanco, Dawn of the Senses. Ed. Juvenal Acosta (San Francisco: City Lights, 1995) xv.

^{4} Blanco, Dawn, back cover.

^{5} Alberto Blanco, Cage of Transparent Words (New York: The Bitter Oleander Press, 2007) back cover.

^{6} Blanco, Cage, back cover.

== Selected works ==
=== Poetry books published in Mexico ===
- Giros de faros, Colección Letras Mexicanas, Fondo de Cultura Económica, Mexico, 1979. (Second Edition, Fondo de Cultura Económica, Mexico, 1985.)
- El largo camino hacia ti, Cuadernos de Poesía, UNAM, Mexico, 1980.
- Antes de nacer, Libros del Salmón, Editorial Penélope, Mexico, 1983.
- Tras el rayo, Cuarto Menguante Editores, Guadalajara, 1985.
- Cromos, Colección Tezontle, Fondo de Cultura Económica, INBA and SEP, Mexico, 1987.
- Canto a la sombra de los animales, in collaboration with the Mexican artist Toledo, Galería López Quiroga, Mexico, 1988.
- El libro de los pájaros, Ediciones Toledo, Mexico, 1990.
- Materia prima, El Ala del Tigre, UNAM, Mexico, 1992.
- Cuenta de los guías, Ediciones Era, Mexico, 1992.
- Amanecer de los sentidos, a personal anthology, with an introduction by Alvaro Mutis, Lecturas Mexicanas, Third Series, Num. 79, Consejo Nacional para la Cultura y las Artes, Mexico, 1993.
- El corazón del instante, a collection of twelve poetry books, Letras Mexicanas, Fondo de Cultura Económica, Mexico, 1998.
- Este silencio, a book of 68 haikus and 4 tankas, illustrated by Xavier Sagarra, Editorial Verdehalago, México, 1998.
- Más de este silencio, a book of 40 haikus, illustrated by Susana Sierra, Ediciones del Ermitaño, México, 2001.
- El libro de las piedras, Práctica Mortal, Consejo Nacional para la Cultura y las Artes, Mexico, 2003.
- Medio cielo, with illustrations by Felipe Morales, Artes de México and Librería Grañén Porrúa, Mexico, 2004.
- La hora y la neblina, second collection of twelve books of poetry:
- Colección Letras Mexicanas, Fondo de Cultura Económica, Mexico, 2005.
- Música de cámara instantánea, 52 poems dedicated to contemporary music composers, Cuadernos de Pauta, CONACULTA, Mexico, 2005.

=== Poetry books published in the United States and other countries ===
- Dawn of the Senses, a bilingual poetry anthology including poems from nine books of poetry and some new poems, edited by Juvenal Acosta, and translated by W. S. Merwin, Edith Grossman, Eliot Weinberger, Julian Palley, John Oliver Simon, Mark Schafer, James Nolan, Jennifer Clement, Robert L. Jones, Joanne Saltz, Joseph Pitkin and Reginald Gibbons, City Lights, San Francisco, California, 1995.
- El origen y la huella/The Origin and the Trace, images by Alberto Dilger, translation by Julian Palley, Circa, San Diego, 2000.
- De vierkantswortel van de hemel, Gedichten, translation by Bart Vonck, Wagner & Van Santen, the Netherlands, 2002.
- Pequeñas historias de misterio, illustrated by Luis Mayo, Galería Estampa, Madrid, 2002.
- A la lumière de la nuit / A la luz de la noche, illustrated with collages translated into French by Danièle Bonnefois, Manière Noire Editeur, Vernon, France, 2005.
- A Cage of Transparent Words, a selection of poems by Alberto Blanco, a bilingual anthology with poems from nine of his books, edited by Paul B. Roth and translated into English by Judith Infante, Joan Lindgren, Elise Miller, Edgardo Moctezuma, Gustavo V. Segade, Anthony Seidman, John Oliver Simon and Kathleen Snodgrass, The Bitter Oleander Press, New York, 2007.
- Feu nouveau / Fuego Nuevo, a bilingual poetry anthology, translation by Stéphane Chaumet, L'Oreille du Loup, Paris, 2009.
- Emily Dickinson: 55 poemas, translation and prologue by Alberto Blanco, Poesía Hiperion, Madrid, 2010.
- Afterglow, a bilingual edition of Tras el rayo, translation by Jennifer Rathbun, the Bitter Oleander Press, New York, 2011.

=== Poetics ===
- El llamado y el don (The Calling and the Gift), AUIEO and CONACULTA, Mexico, 2011.
- La poesia y el presente (Poetry and the Present), AUIEO and CONACULTA, Mexico, 2013.
