= Rock music in Mexico =

Mexican appreciation of, and contributions to, rock music genres

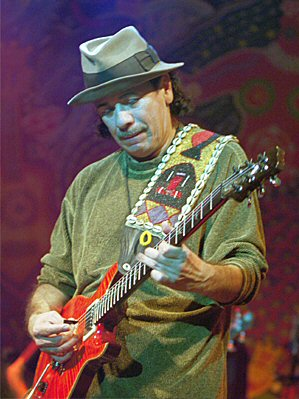
Carlos Santana

Mexican rock music, often referred to in Mexico as rock nacional ("national rock"), originated in the 1950s. Standards by The Beatles, Elvis Presley, The Everly Brothers, Nancy Sinatra, and Chuck Berry were soon covered by bands such as Los Apson, Los Teen Tops, Los Twisters, Los Hitters, Los Nómadas, Los Rockets, Los Rebeldes del Rock, Los Locos del Ritmo, Los Crazy Boys, and Javier Bátiz, which later led to original compositions, often in English. The group "Los Nómadas" was the first racially integrated band of the 1950s. Their lead guitarist, Bill Aken (adopted son of Lupe Mayorga, effectively making Aken the cousin of Ritchie Valens), wrote most of their original material, including the raucous Donde-Donde, and co-wrote the material for their Sounds Of The Barrio album, which is still being sold. Their 1954 recording of She's My Babe was the first top 40 R&B recording by a Latino band. In the southwestern United States, Spanish guitar rhythms and Mexican musical influences may have inspired some of the music of American musicians Ritchie Valens, Danny Flores (of The Champs), Sam the Sham, Roy Orbison, and later, Herb Alpert. Initially, the public exhibited only moderate interest in them, because the media attention was focused on La Ola Inglesa (British Invasion).

However, after the substantial success of Mexican-American guitarist Carlos Santana in the United States in the late 1960s, along with the successful development of Mexico's own counterculture movement called La Onda (The Wave), many bands sprang up. Most of these bands sang in both Spanish and English, keeping foreign commercial exposure in mind. Mexican and Chicano rock have crossed into other Hispanic groups like José Feliciano and Lourdes Rodriguez, of Puerto Rican descent.

== Origins: Orchestra and Jazz ==
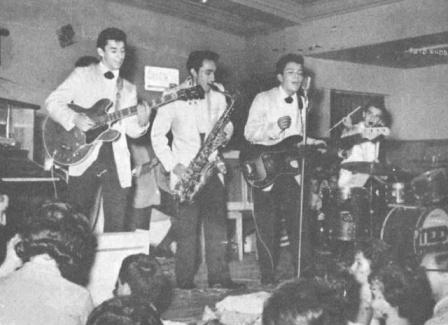
Los Teen Tops achieved important musical successes at the beginning of the years 1960. There come the TEEN TOPS It's the cry of admiration and enthusiasm launched by the public in Mexico.

Rock activity in Mexico in the 1950s took place either in Mexico City and the surrounding area or in northern cities such as Mexicali, Monterrey, Nuevo Laredo, Ciudad Juárez and Tijuana, whose proximity to the United States gave them more exposure to American sounds.

Rock & roll music was introduced to Mexico in the mid 1950s, as musicians like Elvis Presley and Bill Haley were at the peak of their popularity in the US, and their music began to be broadcast in Mexico and covered by Mexican bands.

Except for Tijuana and Los Tj's. In those early years, the first acts that performed and recorded rock & roll in the country were not rock "bands", but rather orchestras that combined jazz sounds with the new genre. Gloria Ríos, an American-born actress and lounge singer, is often credited with introducing rock & roll music in Mexico. Born in Texas in 1928, Ríos arrived in Mexico in 1944 and began recording in 1955 with many musicians (and their orchestras), such as Héctor Hallal, Jorge Ortega, Pablo Beltrán Ruiz, and most importantly, with Mario Patrón and his Estrellas del Ritmo. Many of her recordings were covers of songs by Bill Haley and Elvis Presley, but with Las Estrellas del Ritmo she also recorded "La mecedora" in 1956, a song composed by Mario Patrón, which was said to be the first original song of Mexican rock & roll. Ríos became very popular at the time due to her starring roles in films like "Las locuras del rock and roll" (1956) and "La rebelión de los adolescentes" (1957), but she later married Mario Patrón and in 1960 she went with him to Europe, where they stayed for many years.

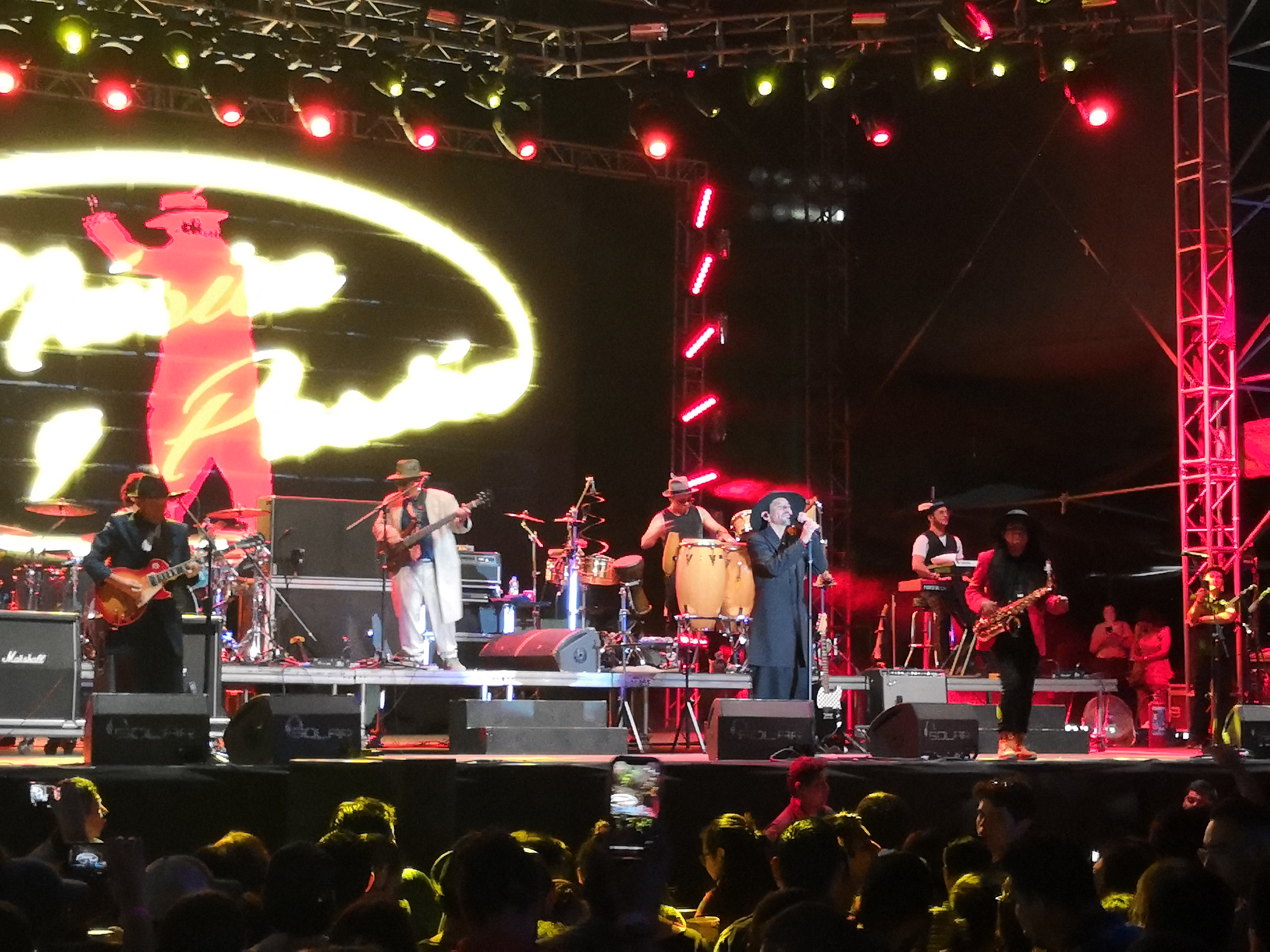
Maldita Vecindad band. Roco, the vocalist, dresses in a manner reminiscent of the pachucos.

This caused Ríos to be quickly forgotten in Mexico, as the new golden age of rock & roll was starting there and new bands claimed to be the ones who had introduced the genre in Mexico. Ríos died in 2002 at the age of 74 years old.

These orchestras soon started to lose popularity as new rock bands appeared, formed by young musicians who mostly covered American and British songs. Los Lunáticos, founded in 1956, are considered by many to be the first Mexican rock and roll band, and later other bands like Los Locos del Ritmo, Los Rebeldes del Rock, Los Teen Tops, etc. became popular. Las Mary Jets, formed in 1959, were the first all-female rock band in Mexico. Rock, as elsewhere, became tied with the youth revolt of the 1960s.

Many songs are credited as being the first original Mexican rock & roll songs, amongst them:

- "La mecedora" (1956), written by Mario Patrón and recorded by his orchestra and Gloria Ríos. This is considered to be the first original Mexican rock song in Spanish.
- "Mexican rock and roll" (1956), written by Pablo Beltrán Ruiz and recorded by his orchestra, it's an instrumental piece.
- "Where Did You Get It?" (1957), written by José Luis Arcaráz and recorded in English by Los Lunáticos.

Bands of the 1950s and, to a lesser degree, were often associated with the middle-class youth of Mexico. Fearing a "Moral Crisis," the PRI-controlled government imposed restrictions on rock music and films, in an effort to protect the "Buenas Costumbres," or proper family values, by "avoid[ing] noxious or disturbing influences on the harmonious development of children and youth." These guides caused any particularly "rebellious" media, including movies and rock, to conform to the PRI's Buenas Costumbres to get their work officially published. In addition, both to protect Mexico's record industry, and simultaneously discourage foreign-inspired challenges to the status quo, heavy tariffs were placed upon imported records. This combination of factors created the "Refrito" movement of the 1950s and early 1960s, where Mexican rock musicians reworked foreign songs to fit in with into the restrictions on music. One of the most popular examples is the song "La Plaga" by Los Teen Tops, a refrito cover of the Little Richard song "Good Golly Miss Molly," where lyrics featuring elements of scandal and rebellion were toned down or altered by Los Teen Tops for the Mexican market.

While many musicians of the refrito era saw success, both domestically and internationally, their music was often criticized by those on the left as "imperialist in nature," and by those on the right for still being too "rebellious," both of which would carry on into the La Onda era of the late 1960s, particularly as the Mexican youth, particularly those associated with rock, became increasingly frustrated with the government and more progressive-leaning.

== Classic Rock ==
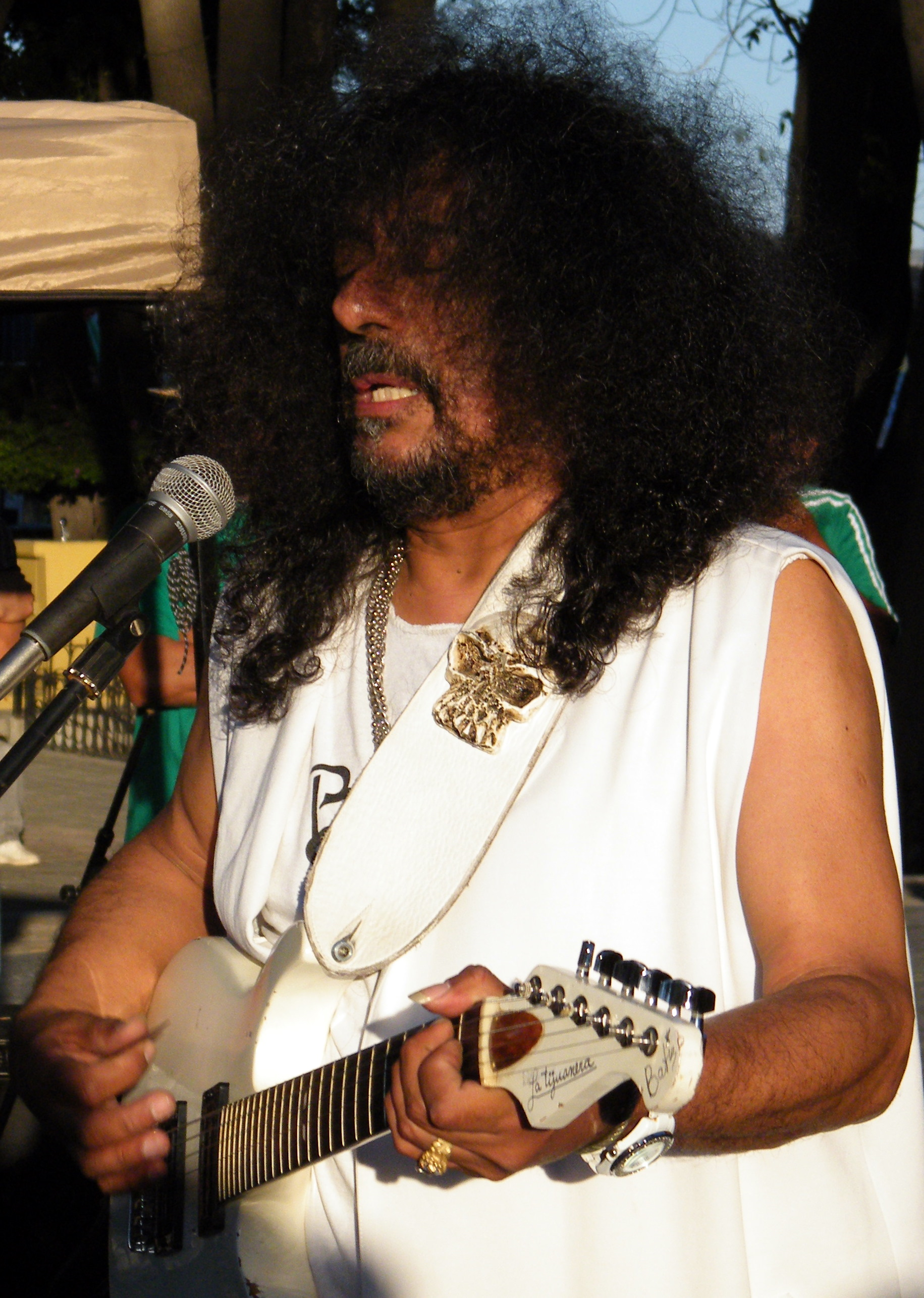
Javier Batiz

The 1960s are considered to be the "golden age" for rock music in Mexico; during this decade, rock groups frequently dominated the music charts and many of them became teen idols. In the early years of the decade, groups like Los Rebeldes del Rock (whose recording "Hiedra venenosa" is considered to have been the first rock and roll recording to be broadcast in Mexican radio, back in 1959), Los Hooligans, Los Locos del Ritmo, among many others, became very famous recording Spanish-language covers of American and British rock standards, as well as some original songs.

One group in particular, Los Teen Tops was very popular in Mexico and in many other countries of the Hispanic world, specifically in Argentina and Spain; their recordings "La plaga" and "Popotitos" are considered some of the most representative of the era.

The counterculture movement is generally agreed to have its roots along the USA-Mexico border, particularly in Tijuana, where the geographical proximity allowed for easier access to foreign music. Bands such as Los Dug Dugs found success covering songs by bands such as The Beach Boys and The Beatles, and soon moved to Mexico City. Other Northern bands would coalesce on Mexico City around this time, and by 1966, a cultural movement would begin to emerge around this music, incorporating contemporary aspects from American culture and fashion. This was called La Onda.

=== Rockeras ===
Women rock musicians, sometimes referred to as rockeras, played a sizeable, if often overlooked role in La Onda, and Mexican rock as a whole. Bands such as Las Mary Jets, Los Spitfires, and Las Chics were the most prominent in the 1960s, though were also subject to the restrictions and regulations placed on the genre by the PRI, as well as increased social stigma for playing rock music in a conservative society. After her band's dissolution, Silvia Garcel of Las Chics reflected on this, saying of her televised performances "They wanted us to look like little girls, well-dressed, modest, neat, and decent," but that this didn't reflect their style: "We wore miniskirts, but only as part of the show. In real life, we didn't wear them[,]" instead preferring to wear the blue jeans associated with the American-influenced La Onda movement. Often times, however, the social and political constraints would prove to win out against more progressive themes, epitomized by Angélica María, who bore the title "Mexico's Girlfriend" in a social role that served as both a role model for young women and girls, and an object of enamor and adoration among men. Because of this, more rebellious rockeras were further vilified in the public eye, when compared to the pure, more socially acceptable Angélica María.

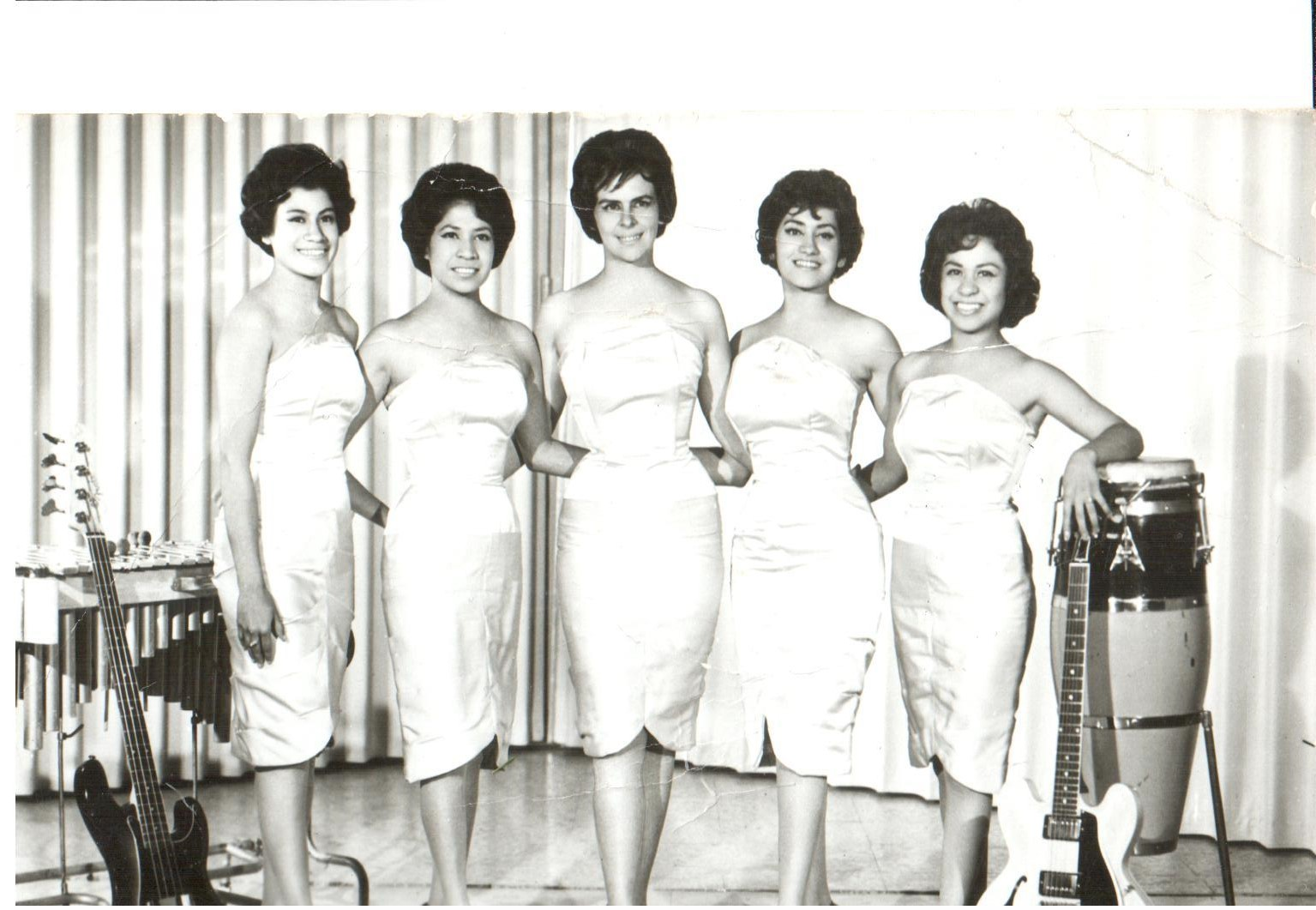
Las Mary Jets

=== Festival Rock y Ruedas de Avándaro, La Onda ===
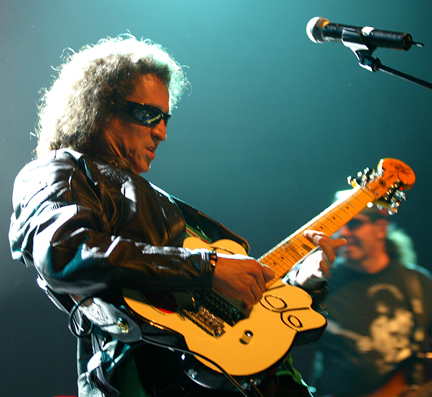
El Tri

Many Mexican rock stars became involved in the counterculture movement. One of the most notorious bands from this decade was La Revolución de Emiliano Zapata, from Guadalajara, Mexico. After winning a local contest, they signed a contract with Polydor Records, and their single "Nasty Sex" was a #1 hit in Mexico in 1971, the only rock song from a Mexican band to achieve such a feat in that decade. However, after many members left the band and the Mexican government severely restricted the recording, publishing, and airplay of rock music in the country, the band (like many others at the time) changed its format and became a romantic ballad group.

The two-day Festival Rock y Ruedas de Avándaro, held in 1971, was organized in the hamlet of Tenantongo near the city of Toluca, a town neighboring Mexico City, and became known as "The Mexican Woodstock".

At that rock festival, nudity, free love, experimental drug use, profanity, the peace sign inserted in the Mexican flag and the presence of the American flag so scandalized the conservative Mexican society that the government imposed cultural curbs to La Onda, and especially to rock music. The media called the move El Avandarazo. The festival, intended to emulate Woodstock and Altamont, expected to attract a maximum of 25,000 concertgoers but about 300,000 showed up. The government helped some stranded attendees at the end of the festival by sending 300 buses.

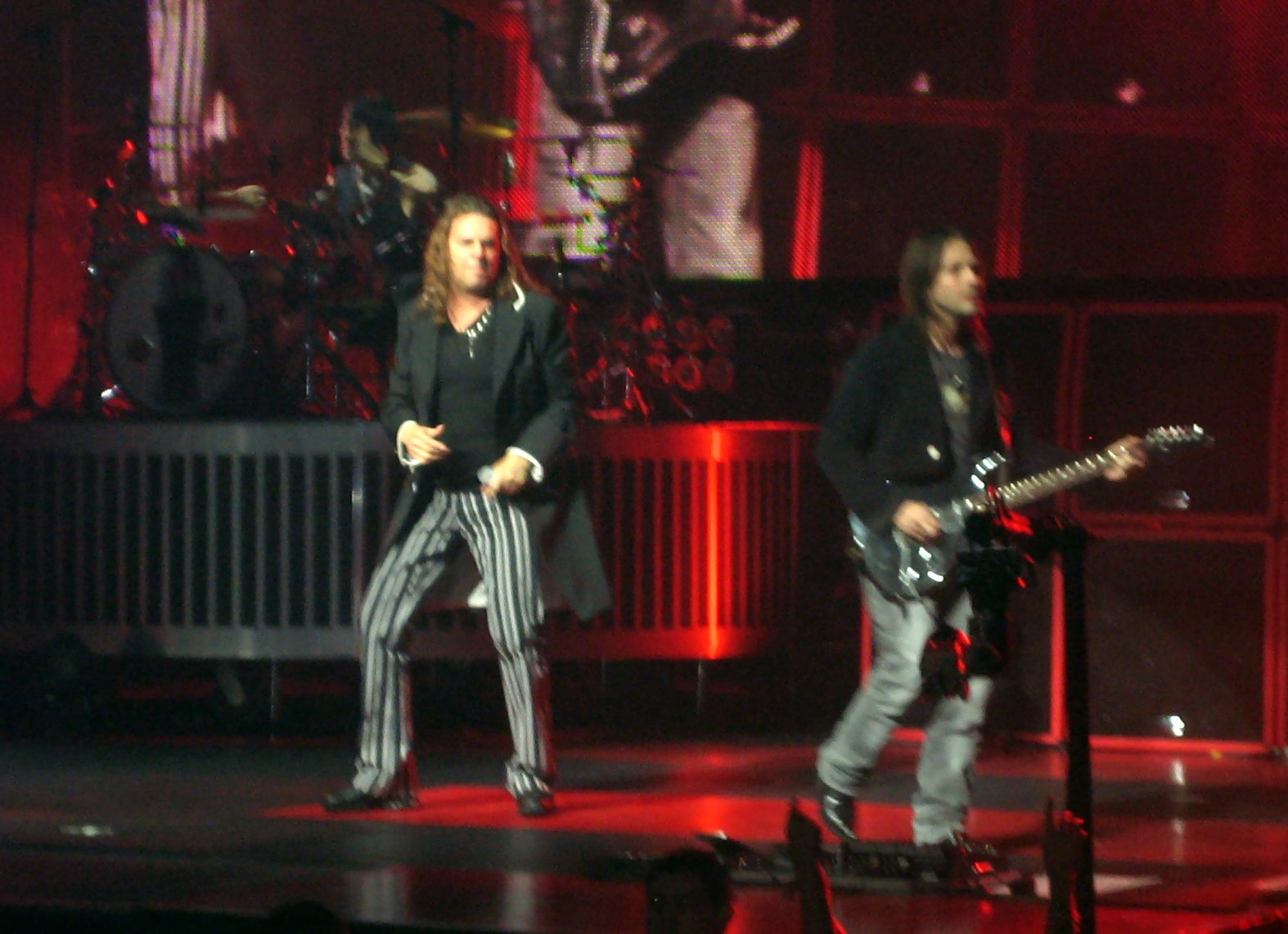
Maná performing in Southern California.

During President Luis Echeverría's administration, the Mexican government tried to win back the country's legitimacy through populist, leftist-oriented programmes.

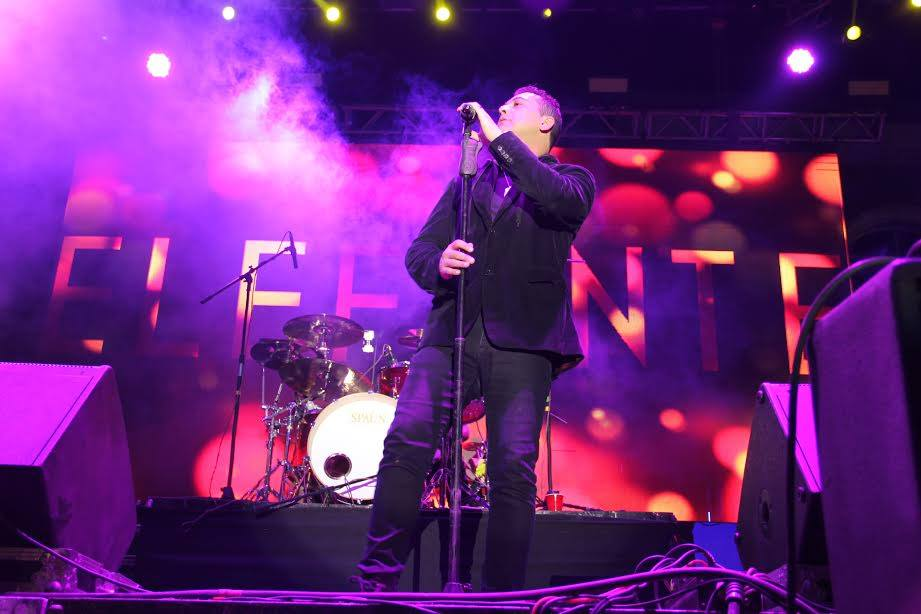
Elefante's (Elephant) song "Así Es La Vida" (That Is How Life Is) was nominated at the 3rd Annual Latin Grammy Awards 2002 for Latin Grammy Best Rock Song.

Most things that could possibly be connected to the counterculture or to student protests were sidelined on public airwaves by the powers that be, who feared a repeat of the student protests of 1968, an event the new government denounced. But most Mexican rock bands sang and criticized the administration in general and, more specifically, corruption, poverty and persistent social inequalities that had taken place through Mexican history.

With the Avandarazo effect at its height and the hippie movement waning worldwide, few bands survived the curbs; though the ones that did, like Three Souls in My Mind (later El Tri), remained popular due in part to their adoption of Spanish for their lyrics, and had a dedicated following. As the hippie trend waned c. 1973, many Mexican bands moved to progressive and hard rock. During the seventies there were many new bands but very little support from the music industry for original rock music. The bands suffered from it and had to limit themselves to performing in hoyos fonqui. Representative bands of this period were: Perro Fantastico, Mara, Vox Populi, Stray Cat, Rock Moviloy and many more. Perro Fantastico, a band from the east side of Mexico City (Ciudad Nezahualcoyotl) created rock music sung in both Spanish and English, formed by the brothers Jose Luis and Jaime Francisco González (guitar and bass) with Guillermo Avalos (drums) and Arturo Fajardo (rhythm guitar). They played, among other bands, in places like Salon Chicago, Macumba, El Herradero until the band disbanded around 1978. During the seventies bands also performed in high schools, universities and other places. Many others followed or continued during the eighties.

=== Ban on Rock ===
The government's ban on rock music during this decade also extended to American groups, and after a 1975 concert in Mexico City by the band Chicago ended with turbulence and police repression, president Echeverría issued a temporary ban on all concerts by American musicians in Mexico.

== Punk and Underground Rock ==
After various government crackdowns and restrictions on rock, particularly after the 1971 Festival Rock y Ruedas de Avándaro, the bands that remained together or formed during this time moved into an underground scene, centered around Mexico City, where the rock and its subgenres finally started to see adoption among the lower classes of Mexican society. This created an entirely new movement, with musicians and fans of their music formed "bandas." Many in these bands created names based on their imposed lower position, such as Mierdas Punk, Manchados, and Punks Not Dead. After the Catholic Church began disparaging these bandas on the basis of assumed Satanism, new bandas formed with names based on this supposed tie to Satanism, such as Abadón, Lucifer, and Blasfemia.

As most rock musicians, particularly anti-establishment ones, had great difficulty finding gigs at proper venues, the 1970s saw many bands performing in "Hoyos Fonquis," literally "funky holes," which were quite unsafe for the performers, as both audience members and police raids could prove harmful. Because of this, many bandas formed cultures of mutual self-defense, a trend that has continued into the modern day. In the 1980s, however, the PRI loosened their restrictions on rock performances, and the bands that had been playing in the Hoyos Fonquis now had access to larger, more legitimate audiences, particularly at the Tianguis del Chopo, a large open-air market in Mexico city, which became a hotspot for fans and practitioners of a variety of genres to come together and trade records, as well as attend live performances. Bands such as El Tri saw their earliest rise to success in this environment.

== Metal ==
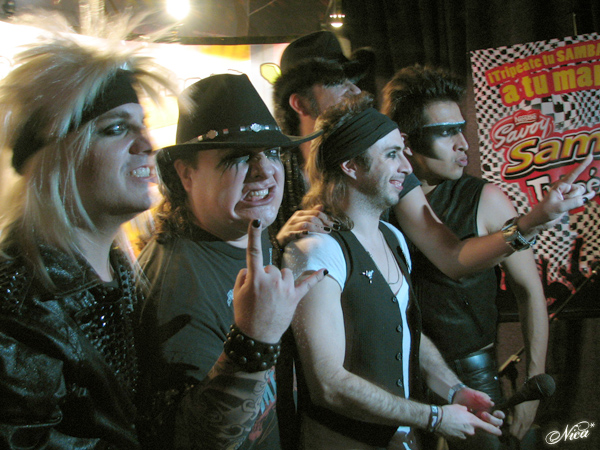
Moderatto known for their exaggerated on-stage personae that parody the stereotypical 1980s glam metal lifestyle.

Since the 1960s, hard rock had been assimilated by several groups, like the aforementioned Los Dug Dugs and El Ritual, and later by others like Polvo and Náhuatl, Nuevo México and Bloody Rock. During the following decade it continued to exist in forms of heavy blues, which was an authentic underground movement, peaking in the late 1970s when the Hoyos Funky came to notoriety around 1977.

Groups like Ramses and La Cruz are veterans of the era and were some of the first to be labeled as "heavy metal", but then again it was not until the 1980s and the early 1990s that bands like Transmetal, Next, Luzbel and Semefo contributed to the scene with original approaches, when the most radical forms of the genre like death metal and grindcore were fully digested. Today the metal scene is populated by such groups as Brujeria, Hacavitz, and Disgorge.

The early bands were followed by many others, in an ever-growing underground movement of sports arenas weekend concerts all over the country.

Important bands of this period were

- Enigma
- Kaleidoscopio
- El Tarro de Mostaza
- El Ritual
- Peace and Love
- Ciruela
- The Spiders
- El Amor
- Three Souls in My Mind
- Toncho Pilatos
- Los Dug Dug's
- El Epilogo
- La Semilla del Amor
- Love Army
- Tinta Blanca
- La Revolución de Emiliano Zapata
- La Tribu
- La Comuna
- 39.4
- La Division del Norte
- Bandido
- Polvo
- La Fachada de Piedra
- Hongo
- Cosa Nostra.

== Rupestre Music ==
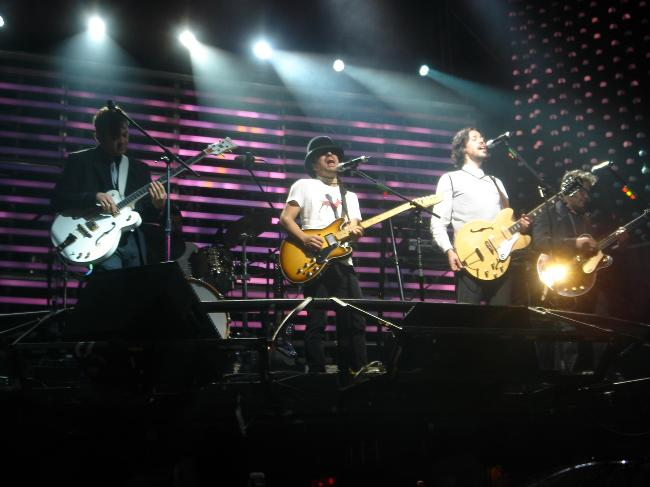
Café Tacuba has won the Latin Grammy Award for Best Rock Song in 2004 for the songs Eres (you are) and in 2008 for Esta Vez (This time).

Since the late 1960s, poets have sung to acoustic guitars and played in the then-prosperous café cantante scene. These forums showcased the folkloric music that came from South America, specially from Peru and Chile. Performers like Víctor Jara, Violeta Parra, Inti-Illimani, Los Folkloristas and local Óscar Chávez among many others denounced in their songs the atrocities of the military juntas, all of which experimented with even worse repression than Mexico during the Tlatelolco incident, that governed most of the countries from Nicaragua to Tierra del Fuego, and curiously the cafes cantantes thrived, as long as nothing was overtly critical of the Mexican government in general.

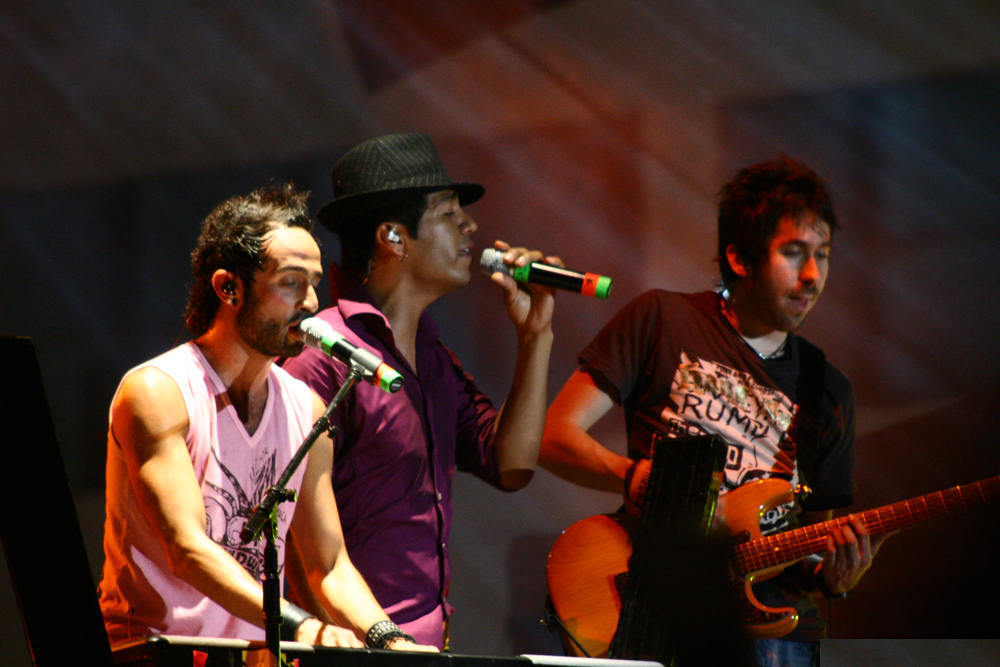
Camila during the 3rd Festival de la Música Latina in Managua in 2007

The scene eclipsed by the early 1980s, but several musicians like Rockdrigo, sometimes nicknamed "the Mexican Bob Dylan" developed a uniquely Mexican folk style, which came to be known as música rupestre. Later, the musicians were dubbed 'Los Urbanos', because although they played acoustic guitars, the themes of their lyrics revealed the adverse conditions the working class had to face in the big cities, and blues forms were incorporated in their compositions. When El Tri made an electric rendition of Rockdrigo's Metro Balderas the fusion of rock and música rupestre was consummated. Many others continued to surface, but Rockdrigo's untimely death during the earthquake of 1985 in Mexico City skyrocketed his already legendary status, and thus he is considered the most influential exponent of both rock urbano and música rupestre.

Other notable bands were Banda Bostik, Sur 16, Tex-Tex and Interpuesto. The racially integrated group Los Nómadas was one of the few to survive for decades. Members of the group consisted of Chico Vasquez, Jose 'J.D.' Moreno, Abel Padilla, and Bill Aken, who formed the band in 1953; they stayed together until well into the 1990s. They were often called into recording sessions to back up Mexicano artists such as Freddy Fender. Their final recording session was in early 1994; when Chico Vasquez died several months later, the group disbanded. The most prominent member of the group was singer-songwriter and producer Bill Aken (aka Zane Ashton), the adopted son of Mexican actress Lupe Mayorga and the only Caucasian member of the band.

=== The Chopo ===
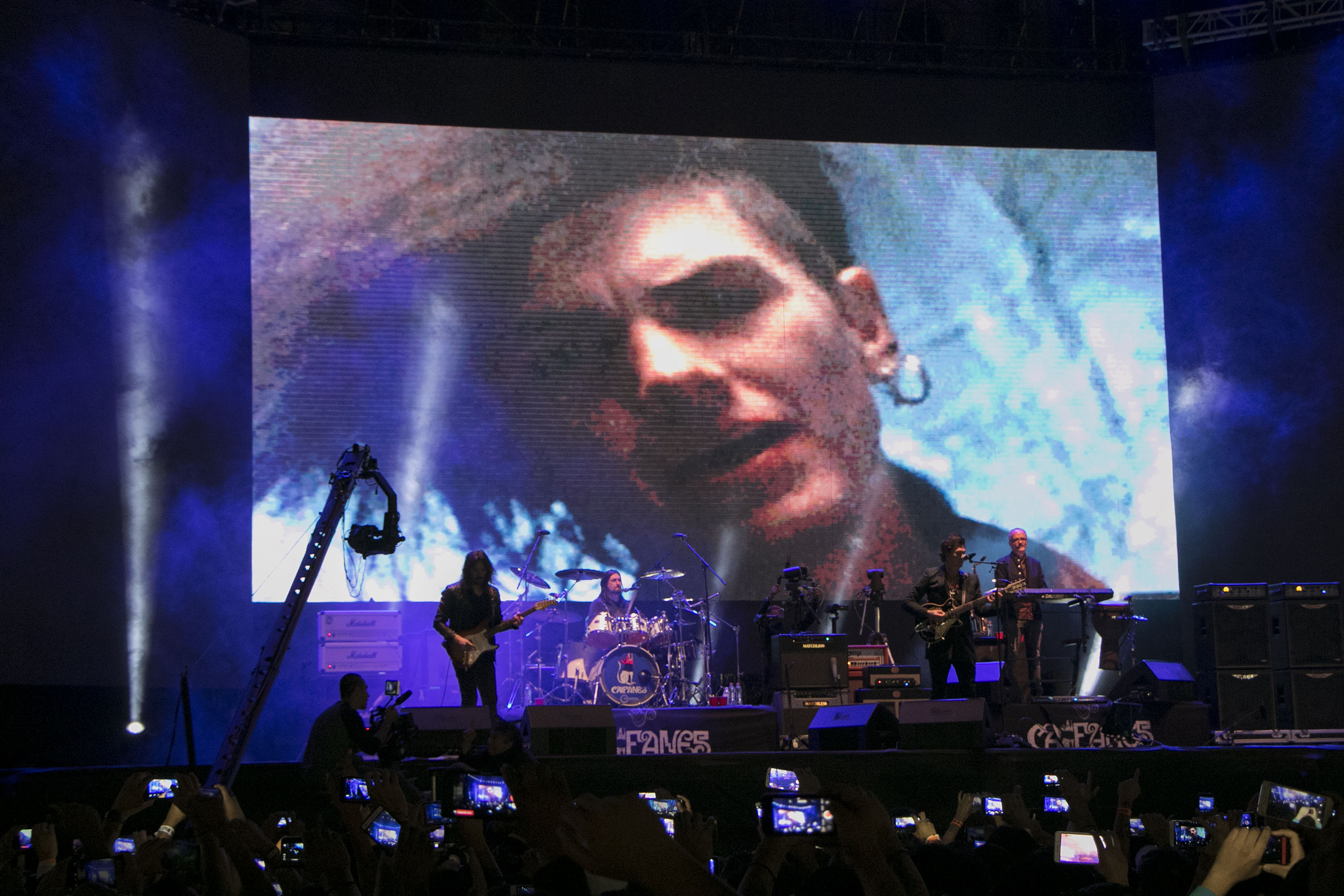
Caifanes 30 anniversary, at the Zócalo de la Ciudad de México, 2017. Jaguares a band formed by former Caifanes won the Latin Grammy Award for Best Rock Song for "Entre Tus Jardines" (Between Your Gardens) in 2009.

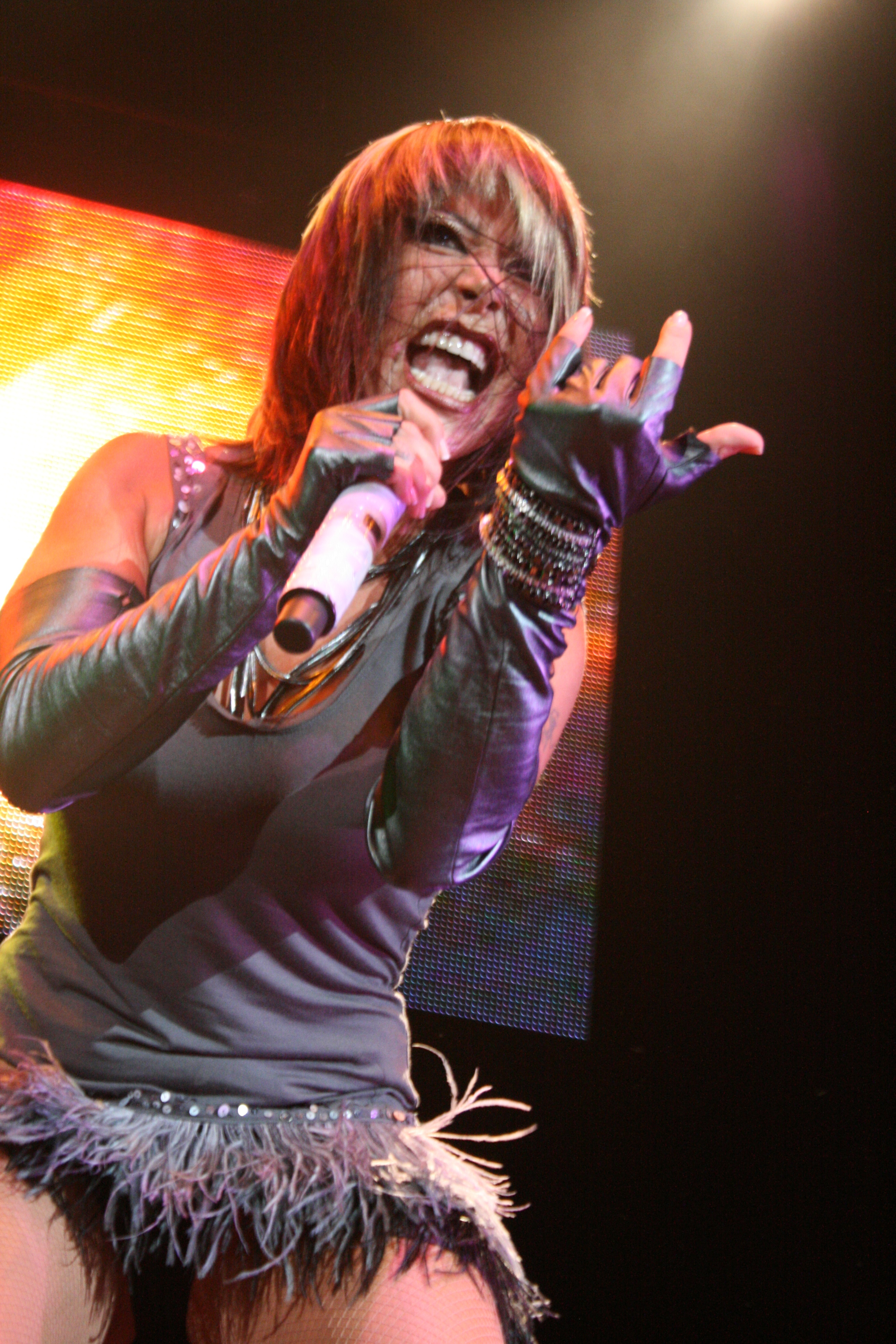
Alejandra Guzmán has earned the title of La Reina del Rock (The Queen of Rock. Latin Grammy Award-winner for Best Rock Solo Vocal Album at 2002.

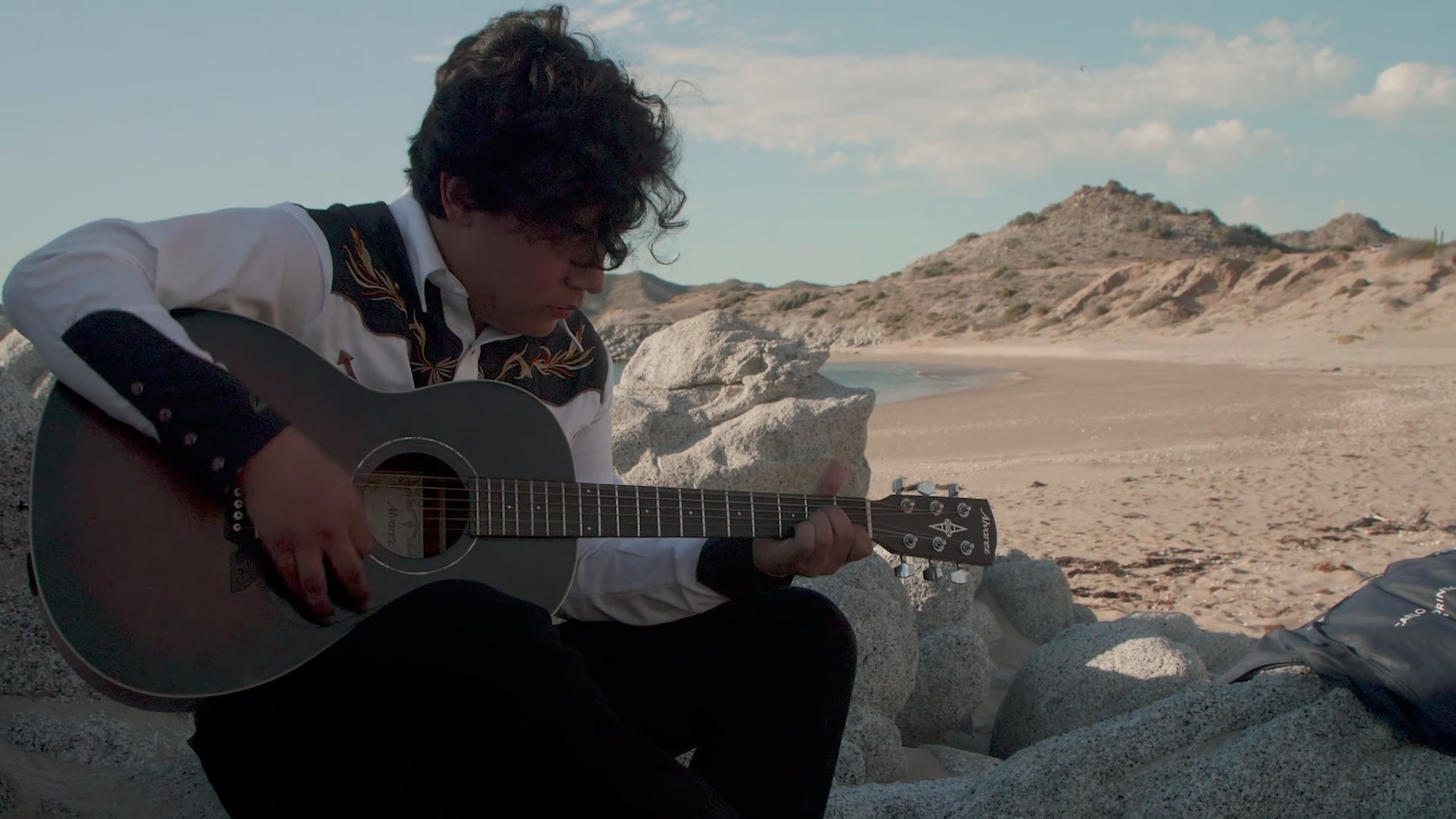
Maverick on the set of the music videos of "Acurrucar" and "Fuentes de Ortiz"

In 1980, the National University of Mexico UNAM, through one of its cultural departments, invited the general public to bring their LP records and trade them with others at the Museo Universitario del Chopo in Mexico City, every Saturday morning.

Initially the trading took place inside the facilities of the museum, but by the end of the year the increasing number of attendees became too large for the venue, as collectors sought records that were otherwise impossible to get from established outlets. The trading became selling in many cases, with record dealers taking advantage of the new market for rock "rarities". The gathering extended to the street right in front of the museum, and several stands were erected, transforming the event into a tianguis, a kind of outdoor flea market or bazaar. The museum became a popular hang-out for punks, new wavers, hippies, rastafaris, and other subcultures who were able to express themselves freely at the weekly gathering and meet others with the same tastes.

The museum and the National University eventually broke ties with the tianguis, stating that it had got out of hand, and due to increasing friction with local residents, the government soon tried to ban it. By now the participants had established themselves into a community, and collectively presented a proposition to the local government dependency, offering to maintain the necessary security and pay a permanent fee.

However, the officials were reluctant, and between 1982 and 1989 the "Chopo", while still growing, changed locations six times, from parks to parking lots to faculty gardens, always due to pressure from officials.

Since 1990 it has been taking place on a street behind the Buenavista railway station, less than three blocks from the original 'Museo del Chopo' location. From the original 100 people that began attending in 1980, it is estimated that more than 10,000 people now visit the tianguis every week. As well as the original record trading, other products sold and displayed at the event include clothing, posters, movies, handicrafts, magazines, books, instruments, and other rock-related paraphernalia.

== Spanish invasion and response ==
Concurrent to the second wave British Invasion in the U.S., the Mexican rock scene in the early 1980s immediately fell prey to a “European Invasion” of its own with various artists from Spain taking over the radio. Influential Spanish rock bands like Hombres G, Mecano, Radio Futura and La Unión took over the spotlight with their experimental sounds and melancholic lyrics. Mexico’s music culture saw a newly inspired generation of rock bands emerge in response such Caifanes, Maná, Ritmo Peligroso, Botellita de Jeréz, El Tri and the Micro Chips.

Mexican pop music on the other hand (a genre known for its trademark ballads) saw an unexpected explosion of success by incorporating early synths into an overall more pop rock based production with bands such as Timbiriche, Pandora, and Flans dominating the charts alongside Spanish pop bands like Olé-Olé.

== Rock in Monterrey ==
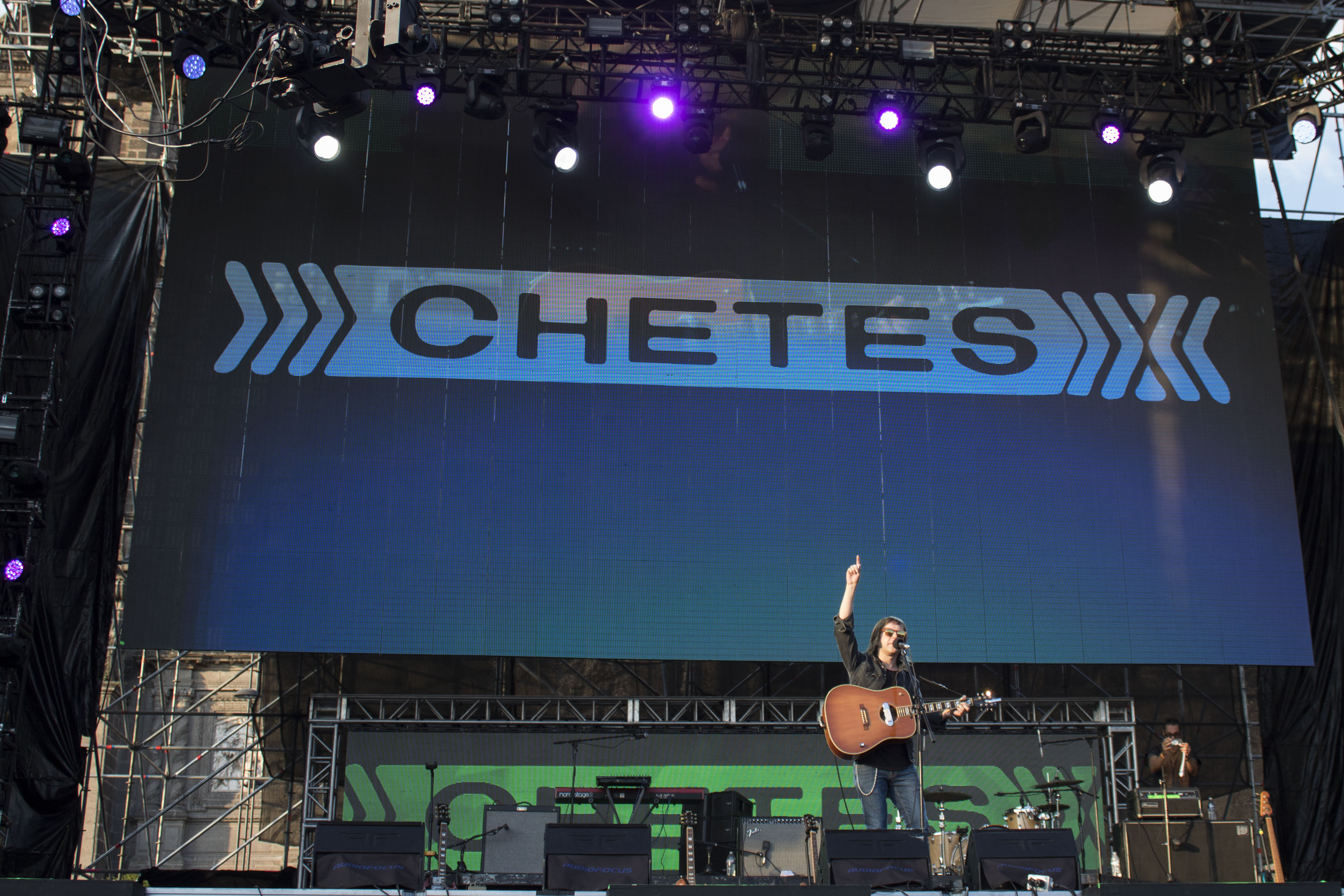
Chetes

Starting in the 90s, the city of Monterrey in the Mexican state of Nuevo Léon witnessed the birth of several bands that have become internationally acclaimed. Their genres vary considerably, but they include COhETICA, El Gran Silencio, Genitallica, Jumbo, Kinky, Panda, Plastilina Mosh, The Warning, Volován, Zurdok and the heavy metal band IRA.

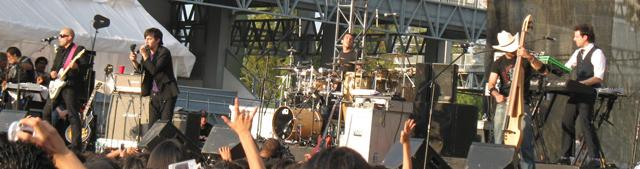
Kinky

The song Los Oxidados by Plastilina Mosh opens the 2005 movie Mr. & Mrs. Smith. Kinky performed at the 2004 edition of the Coachella Valley Music and Arts Festival in Indio, California, along with Radiohead, The Cure and The Killers.

The all-female heavy rock band, The Warning became internationally successful from the 2020s, making several concert tours in North-America and Europe, performing on major music festivals and even promoted by MTV. They are the first Latin-American band signed directly to a major US label company.

A few of the popular local live music venues in Monterrey include the Arena Monterrey, the Auditorio Banamex, and local clubs Cafe Iguana and McMullen's, both located in the Barrio Antiguo section of the city.

== Indigenous Rock ==
Indigenous musicians have been a part of Mexican rock movements since at least the 1970s, but recently have seen an increase in popularity in recent decades, with artists from a myriad of backgrounds adding their distinct flair and sound to rock. Bands such as Sak Tzevul, Hamac Caziim, and Los Cogelones have been some of the most prevalent in the modern Indigenous rock scene, with each bringing their own distinct style through their cultural dress and language. Hamac Caziim in particular are invested in using the platform of music in order to more popularize and support the Comcaac language and community they are a part of.

Indigenous musicians have unfortunately always faced discrimination and undue criticism, with some critics deriding Indigenous rock as "inauthentic", due to their western influence. Tzotzil band Sak Tzevul responded to this line of criticism by stating "There are things so deeply rooted that neither Coca-Cola nor anyone else can take away from us."

== Alternative and Indie rock ==
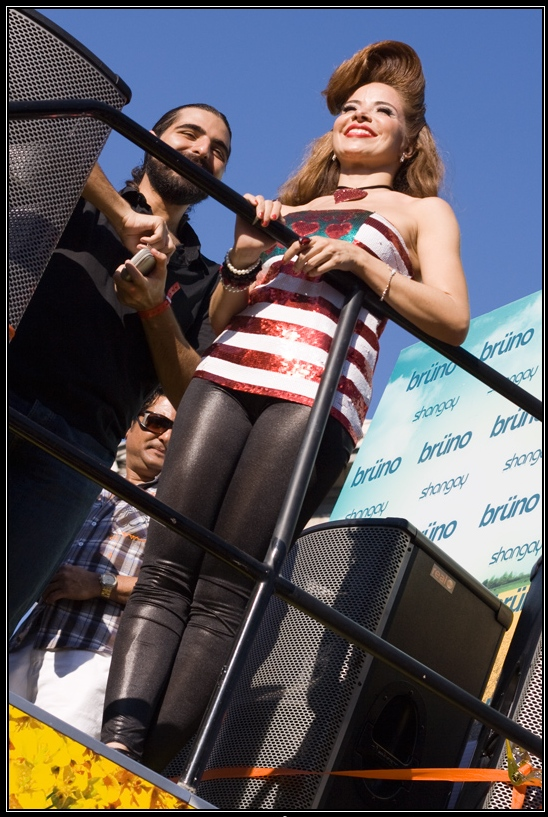
Gloria Trevi Mexican pop-rock singer-songwriter and one of the most controversial Mexican artists.

In the 1990s and 2000s, a number of performers have attained international renown, including alternative rock acts such as Santa Sabina, Café Tacuba, Fobia, Caifanes (now Jaguares), Julieta Venegas, ska band Maldita Vecindad, and synthpop group Mœnia.

Control Machete, Delasónica and Molotov explored rap/rock fusion, with lyrics containing social commentary mixed with urban vulgarity. The most popular Mexican rock group during this period has been Maná, which have sold over 22 million albums worldwide.

== Modern rock ==
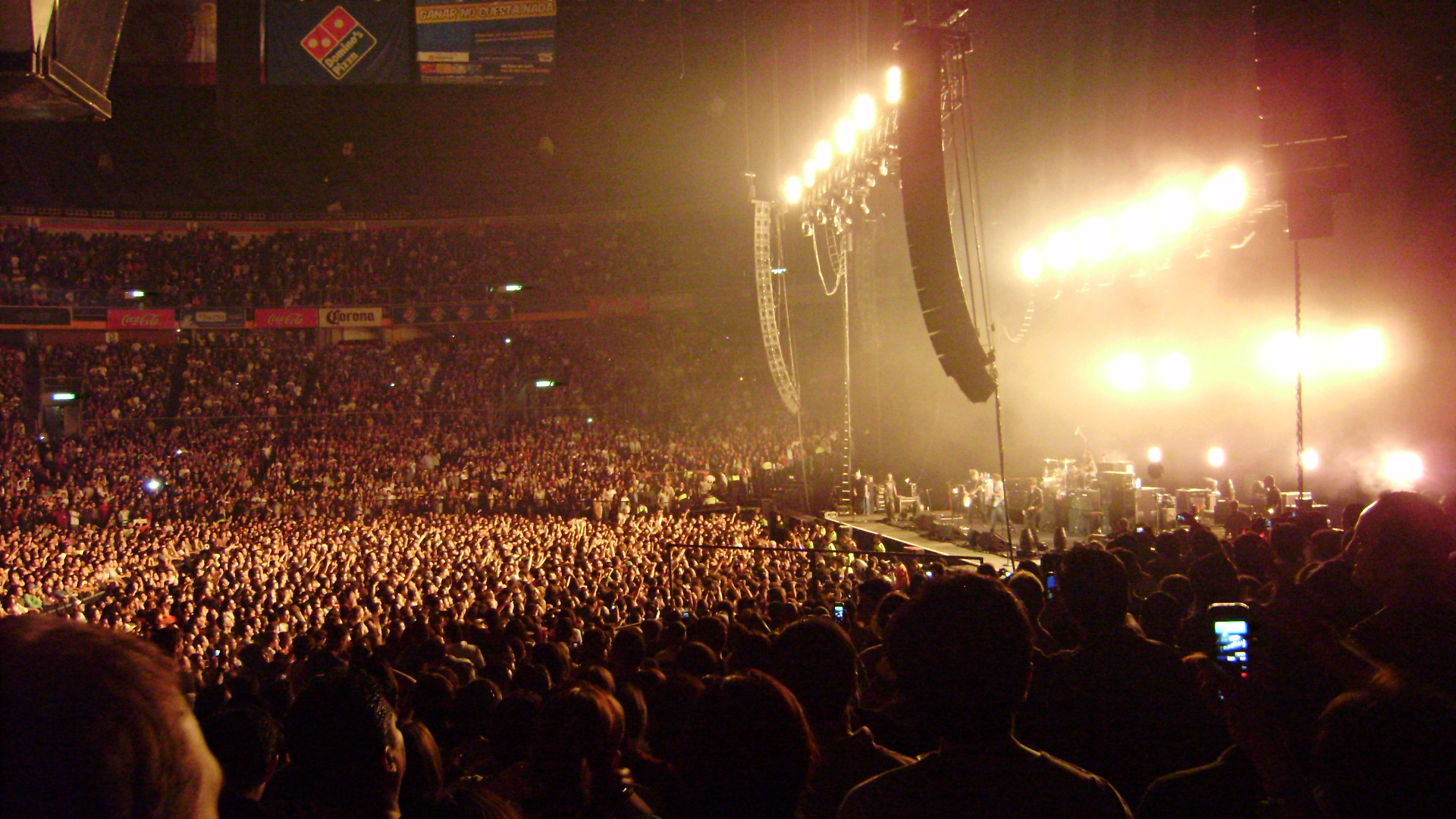
Mexican rock concert

The 2000s also saw the emergence of a new generation of Mexican alternative and indie rock musicians. Alternative groups and artists such as Motel, Reik, Allison, Panda, Hello Seahorse!, División Minúscula, Zoé, Natalia Lafourcade, and Insite have received mainstream success in Mexico and throughout Latin America.

The indie music scene in Mexico has produced bands such as Porter, Austin TV, Animal Gang, The Copper Gamins, inspired by The White Stripes, from more remote central Mexico, Los Dynamite, Chikita Violenta, Los Jaigüey, Secret Agent, Bengala, and Hello Seahorse!, who often write lyrics in English and have toured alongside American indie rock bands throughout Latin America and the United States.

Popular electronic music and synthpop groups include Moenia, Belanova, Jotdog, Sussie 4, Hocico, Amduscia and The Nortec Collective.

== See also ==
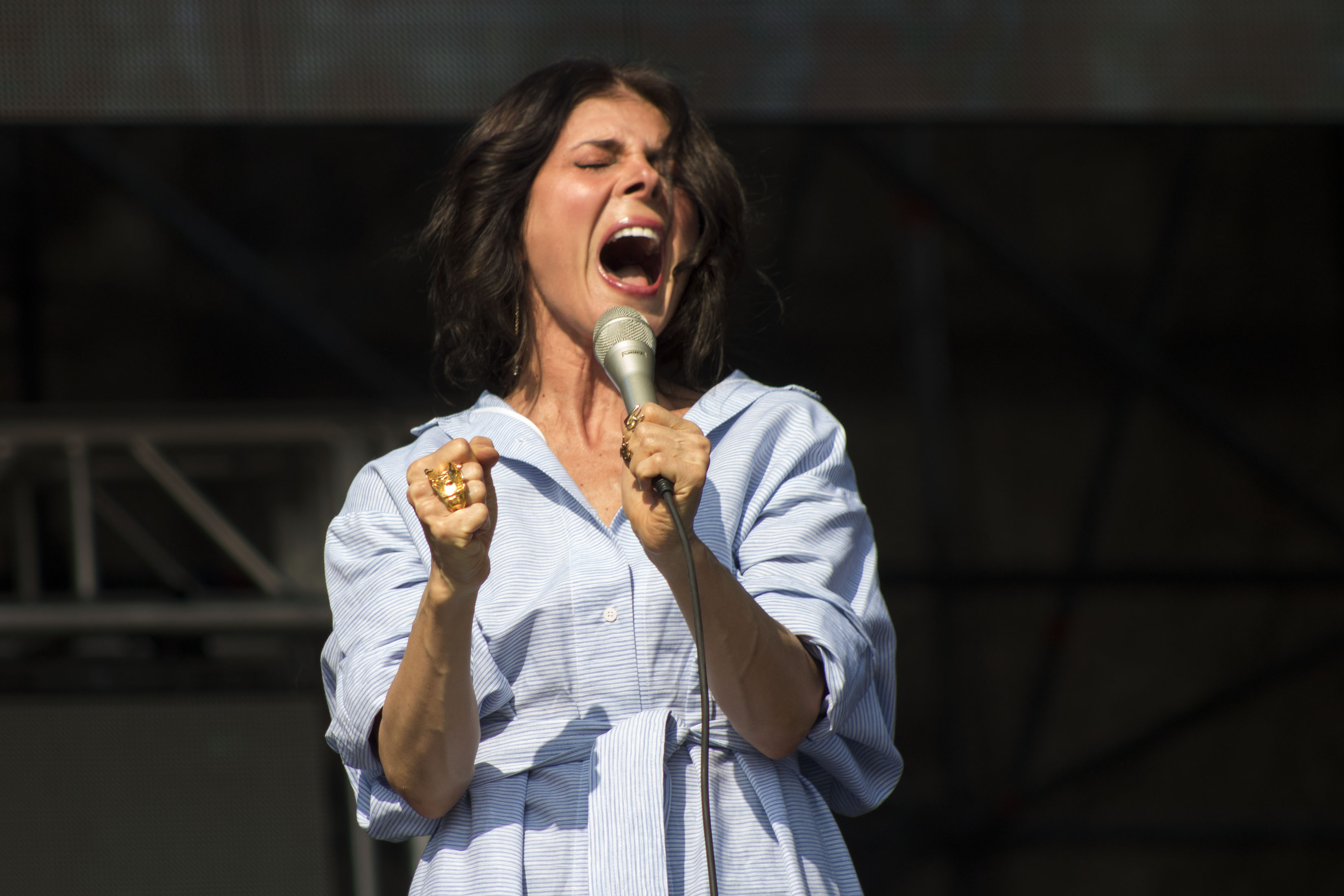
Ely Guerra in Mexico City, 2017.

- Chicano rock
- Rock en tu idioma
- Latino punk
- Avanzada Regia
- La Onda
