= La Revolución de Emiliano Zapata =

Mexican rock band

- Origin: Guadalajara, Jalisco, Mexico
- Genres: Psychedelic rock; rock en español
- Years active: 1969–present
- Labels: Polydor Records; Discos Melody; Discos Imposibles
- Members: Servando Ayala (Keyboards); César Maliandi(Bass guitar); Daniel Kitroser (Drums)
- Past members: Javier Martín del Campo (Vocals, Guitar, flute, piano, composer); Oscar Rojas Gutiérrez (Vocals); Carlos Valle Ramos (Guitar); Francisco Martínez Ornelas (Bass); Antonio Cruz Carbajal (Drums); Marco Carrasco; Jorge Gámiz; Guillermo Goñi (Drums); Adrián Cuevas (Bass); Pati McLean (Backing Vocals); Marylú Bano (Backing Vocals)

La Revolución de Emiliano Zapata (meaning "Emiliano Zapata's Revolution" in English) is a Mexican rock band that broke sales records in Europe and Mexico with their hit song "Nasty Sex" at the height of the counterculture era of the early 1970s. Breaking ties with their original concept as the hippie era waned worldwide by the mid-1970s, they continued actively interpreting romantic ballads with considerable success. In 2009, they returned as a rock act.

The band has gone through numerous musical and lineup changes, and throughout its existence the only member that has always been in the band is its founder, Javier Martín del Campo.

== Dizzying start and breakthrough ==
In the era of psychedelic rock and under the influence of American hippies of the late 1960s, a Mexican multidisciplinary counterculture movement called La Onda was born. Headed by Javier Martin del Campo, a band was formed in Guadalajara with the intention of interpreting contemporary popular songs of the era in their own style. Initially, their hobby led them to play at local parties, but the resulting fame soon spread beyond their city. They adopted their name after Emiliano Zapata's slogan of "Tierra y Libertad" (Land and Liberty) as a protest to the establishment by using national symbols. The group won the most call-in votes during a contest organized by a local radio station called "Radio ondas de la alegria" (Waves of Happiness Radio), and earned themselves an audition with an important record label.

Although initially reluctant, they signed a contract with Polydor Records, launching their brief but successful foray into the world of rock music. With an original musical concept and creative sense, the group moved to Mexico City, continuing to adapt their urban rhythms and establish a base for their new musical launches. In 1970, they released their first record, containing songs "Nasty Sex", "Shit City" and "Still don't (Not yet)", which quickly shot up the popular charts both locally and worldwide. The head office of Polydor Records sent the group five medals as recognition for their high level of sales in the Americas, United Kingdom, and Europe of their one big hit, "Nasty Sex".

Despite its suggestive title, "Nasty Sex" asks women not to have casual sex with irresponsible men but rather with men they love, something La Onda's icon Parménides Garcia criticized severely in his articles, referring to them as "snobbish" ("fresas").

== Avándaro, cinema and decline ==
They were invited to perform in the Avandaro festival in 1971, but declined the invitation due to an already very busy schedule. In that year, they took part in the Jaime Humberto Hermosillo's debut film "La verdadera vocación de Magdalena" ("The True Calling of Magdalena"), starring singer and actress Angélica María, which more or less seriously addresses the topics that concerned young people of the era. In the movie, a (fictional) appearance of the band with Angelica Maria (in their alter egos) at the Avandaro festival can be seen. The movie editors combined in-studio shots with the actors and real ones of Avandaro, shot by Telesistema Mexicano. After this successful film came its soundtrack, "HOY-Nada del hombre me es ajeno" considered the band's second album.

The members of the band at its height were: Óscar Rojas (vocals), Marylú Bano (backing vocals), Pati McLean (backing vocals), Carlos Valle (lead & rhythm guitar), Francisco Martínez Ornelas (bass guitar), Antonio Cruz (drums and percussion) and Javier Martín del Campo (lead & rhythm guitar).

With the hippie trend waning worldwide, the group's musical concepts varied between several trends and influences, so the search for new hits was fruitless, producing only the song "Pigs", among the last to achieve fame. Lack of interest of major record companies to support counterculture rock and as result of the phenomenon called Avandarazo (the repression of La Onda movement by the Mexican Government) successful Mexican rock bands were suddenly banned. Adding to this was the emotional turmoil that the band members began to experience, unleashing a series of fights and disagreements that eventually led to changes in the lineup. Lead singer Oscar Rojas grew weary of both Mexico city and the group environment, leaving the band permanently in late 1972 together with Bano and McLean. In 1973, the band released the E.P. Congore tumbero a la mar with moderate success. This marked the end of their relationship with Polydor and the end of an era for the band.

== 180° turnaround and final hits ==
Facing a somewhat hostile political and social reaction, the group's fortunes experienced a downturn. Changing musical trends ended by subduing psychedelic rock, and while some groups managed to survive on the fringes of mainstream media (the band Three Souls in my Mind for example, becoming popular in suburban areas and with the working classes only), the band members decided to radically change their musical style, becoming singers of romantic ballads, thus ending their time as a rock band. This change, according to former drummer Antonio Cruz, was carefully considered, and it was this decision that allowed the group to continue existing in the current musical climate.

Now part of a new record label (Discos Melody) with a new lineup of members that included: Jorge Gamiz (vocals), Servando Ayala Bobadilla (keyboard), Adrian Cuevas (bass), Antonio Cruz (drums) and Javier Martin del Campo (guitar), the group achieved a revival in their fortunes with romantic songs that placed them once again on the Mexican pop charts.

"Cómo te extraño" "How I Miss You" (1975), which was written by the band's drummer, Antonio Cruz, was originally offered to the Sonorense conjunto Grupo Yndio, but Yndio's version went mostly unnoticed. Shortly after, the group decided to record the song themselves, with Cruz on the vocals. This recording turned out to be a major hit in Mexico, although its romantic style alienated many fans of the band that had followed them since their days as a rock band. Nevertheless, it was the band's first mainstream hit since "Nasty Sex" in 1971. The group also recorded an English-language version of the song, titled "Oh, How I Need You", with slightly different lyrics and with Cruz again on the vocals, although this version went unnoticed.

"Mi forma de sentir" "The Way I Feel" (1978), written by Martín del Campo, was a moderate hit and allowed the group to find favour once again in the pop charts. In the mid-1990s, "Mi forma de sentir" was recorded by Pedro Fernández, which would become a major world hit in his career and simultaneously a fresh boost to Martin del Campo's career as a songwriter worldwide.

In 2009, the band split and La Revolucion de Emiliano Zapata resumed to be a romantic-ballad act while La Revo became the rock act, releasing a new record simply called La Revo and a video of the new hit song Mi arbol oficial, under the independent record company Discos Imposibles.

Former frontman, Oscar Rojas, formed his own band initially naming it La Revolución de Emiliano Zapata but after a brief and amicable dispute, he named his band Retro-Revolucion.

In 2012, Jalisco's Council for the Arts funded a documentary called Sing a song of love, directed by Ricardo Sotelo and José Leos.

On 29 July 2026, it was announced that Javier Martín del Campo had died at the age of 75.

== Discography ==
1. La Revolución de Emiliano Zapata (1971)
2. Nada del Hombre me es Ajeno (La verdadera Vocación de Magdalena) (1972)
3. Congore tumbero a la mar (1973)
4. La Nueva Onda de La Revolución de Emiliano Zapata (1975)
5. La Revo (2009)
6. La Revo a la calle (2013)

== Filmography ==
- La verdadera vocacion de Magdalena. Produced by Cinematografica Marco Polo S.A. Directed by Jaime Humberto Hermosillo. México 1972.
- BACK, un recorrido por el rock tapatio de los 70s. Produced by Universidad de Guadalajara-Alcira Valdivia. Directed by José Gutiérrez. México 2006.
- LA REVO: Sing a song of Love. Produced by Jalisco's CECA (Consejo Estatal para la Cultura y las Artes). Directed by Ricardo Sotelo and José Leos. México 2012.
