= The Brain Police =

- Origin: Chula Vista, California, United States
- Genres: Psychedelic rock, garage rock, protopunk
- Years active: 1968–1969
- Labels: Head, Rockadelic, Shadoks Music, Akarma, Guerssen
- Past members: Rick Randle; David Randle; Frank Mannix; Tony Johnson; Norman Lombardo; Sid Smith; Larry Grant

The Brain Police were an American psychedelic rock band formed in Chula Vista, California, in 1968. Led by songwriters Rick Randle and Norman Lombardo, the project had a cult following in the West Coast's psychedelic scene. Between touring with notable 1960s musical acts, the Brain Police recorded a single and an album's worth of material but failed to pick up traction from a major record label. Although the demos that originated from these 1968 sessions were bootlegged, the songs saw a proper release in the 1990s.

== History ==
Formed in 1968, the Brain Police consisted of principle songwriters Rick Randle (guitar, vocals) and Norman Lombardo (bass guitar) who were joined by Randle's older brother David (lead guitar) and Tony Johnson (drums). Johnson left the group however before any recordings were completed, and was replaced by Sid Smith. Other contributors to the band included a black soul group known as the Soul Patrol which occasionally filled in for the Brain Police for live performances.

Randle and Lombardo were previously both members of the Man-Dells, one of the earliest garage rock bands to record. Over a few months between 1964 and 1965, the group recorded and released the rockabilly-influenced "Bonnie" single. With a changed name, the Other Four, the band released three additional singles in 1965 and 1966, including one distributed on the national label Decca Records. While commenting on the brief history of the Other Four, music historian Richie Unterberger wrote their work was reminiscent of the Monkees "at their hardest-rocking" and the Beach Boys.

The Brain Police, one of the few psychedelic rock bands established in San Diego, played regularly throughout California with contemporaries of the psychedelic music scene such as Jefferson Airplane, Buffalo Springfield, and Strawberry Alarm Clock. The same year the group recorded a demo album that focused on original material written by Randle and Lombardo in La Mesa in an attempt to secure a recording contract with a major record label. Much to the band's frustrations, the Brain Police received no offers for their work and the group disbanded following a tour with Steppenwolf in the Southwest United States.

The recordings went unreleased until 1997, when local music historian Clark Faville discovered the unreleased album and released it on the Rockadelic Records imprint; the Brain Police's album has remained in print since 2012 through various labels. In 2000, Shadoks Music released the San Diego's Only Psychedelic Cops compilation album which reissued material recorded by the Man-Dells and the Other Four for the first time.
