= Toncho Pilatos =

- Origin: Guadalajara, Mexico
- Genres: Psychedelic rock, acid rock, progressive rock, blues rock, hard rock
- Years active: 1972–1992
- Label: Polydor
- Members: Alfonso Guerrero Sánchez†; Rigoberto Guerrero Sánchez†; Miguel Robledo; Raúl Briseño; Alberto López†

Toncho Pilatos was a Mexican 1970s rock band. Along with Three Souls in my Mind (later known as El Tri) and Los Dug Dug's, it was one of the most representative predecessors of the "under" scene of Mexican rock. Developed as so-called "hoyos funkies"; their music transcended their live performances rather than commercial success.

== History ==
In spite of their Rolling Stones influence, Toncho Pilatos interpreted original instrumentation. Polydor issued their first album, with a double cover, within its 'Power Rock' series, something of a first for a Mexican band. The Toncho Pilatos album was so successful that it was even released in Germany.

The tolerance and support supplied by Polydor was almost unique at that time, and both Bob Dylan and Beck commented on the influence of Toncho Pilatos' debut release. Critics were divided over the recorded work, but most agreed concert performances brought the best out of the Guadalajaran based band. Their national television debut took place on 3 May 1974, on the television program Hour Zero, with production from Luis de Llano, through Channel 4 of the DF. The violins of the Mariachi New Tecalitlán also enhanced the presentation. In time, Toncho Pilatos incorporated the violinist Richard Nassau, originating from Chicago, United States, into the group.

Nevertheless, and in spite of the achieved success, it was not until 1980 that Toncho Pilatos returned to record their second studio album, Segunda Vez. To a large extent, this delay was because Mexican rock music had entered a low period, due to the repression and intolerance that arose after the Festival of Avándaro. At the end of the 1980s, Toncho Pilatos had disappeared from the scene. After several changes of membership, the group appeared in Los Angeles, under the name of Toncho Indian Braves. In 1991, they recorded their third and final studio album, Soy un Mexicano.

Alfonso Toncho Guerrero died on 4 July 1992, at the age of 42 years, just a few months after the release of the album, and only weeks after the band's last television appearance. The legacy of Toncho Pilatos, with their Mexicanista sound and Spanish lyrics sowed the seeds for Mexican rock music.

== Discography ==
- 1973: Toncho Pilatos
- 1975: Toncho Pilatos: En Vivo en el Salón Chicago
- 1980: Segunda Vez
- 1987: Toncho Pilatos: En vivo en el Auditorio Magdaleno Varela
- 1992: Soy un Mexicano
