= Zerfas (band) =

Zerfas was a psychedelic rock band from Indianapolis consisting of brothers David and Brian (Herman) Zerfas.

They put out one album, Zerfas, in 1973. The album was produced by Moe Whittemore, and released on his 700 West record label.

Mojo referred to the band as "legends ... who could conceivably have made it, if only they'd received proper backing."
