= Love, Peace & Poetry =

Compilation album series

Love, Peace & Poetry is a music compilation series created by Thomas Hartlage. The records explore obscuro psychedelic rock music from specific regions around the world. The series began in 1998 and is released by QDK Media and Normal Records on compact disc and vinyl.

The model on the cover of all the albums is Cheryl Shrode, a go-go dancer and model who appeared in Playboy in 1967. The photos were taken by Bunny Yeager.

== Discography ==
- American Vol. 1 (1998)
- Latin American Vol. 2 (1998)
- Asian, Vol. 3 (2000)
- Japanese, Vol. 4 (2001)
- British, Vol. 5 (2001)
- Brazilian, Vol. 6 (2003)
- Mexican, Vol. 7 (2003)
- African, Vol. 8 (2004)
- Turkish, Vol. 9 (2005)
- Chilean, Vol. 10 (2008)
