= Los Dug Dug's =

Rock band

- Also known as: Xippos Rock
- Origin: Durango, Mexico
- Genres: Psychedelic rock, progressive rock, rock and roll, garage rock, hard rock
- Years active: 1960–present
- Labels: RCA, BMG
- Past members: Armando Nava; Jorge Luján; Alberto Escoto; Jorge de la Torre †; Sergio Orrante; Moisés Muñoz
- Website: raybrazen.webng.com/dugdugs.com

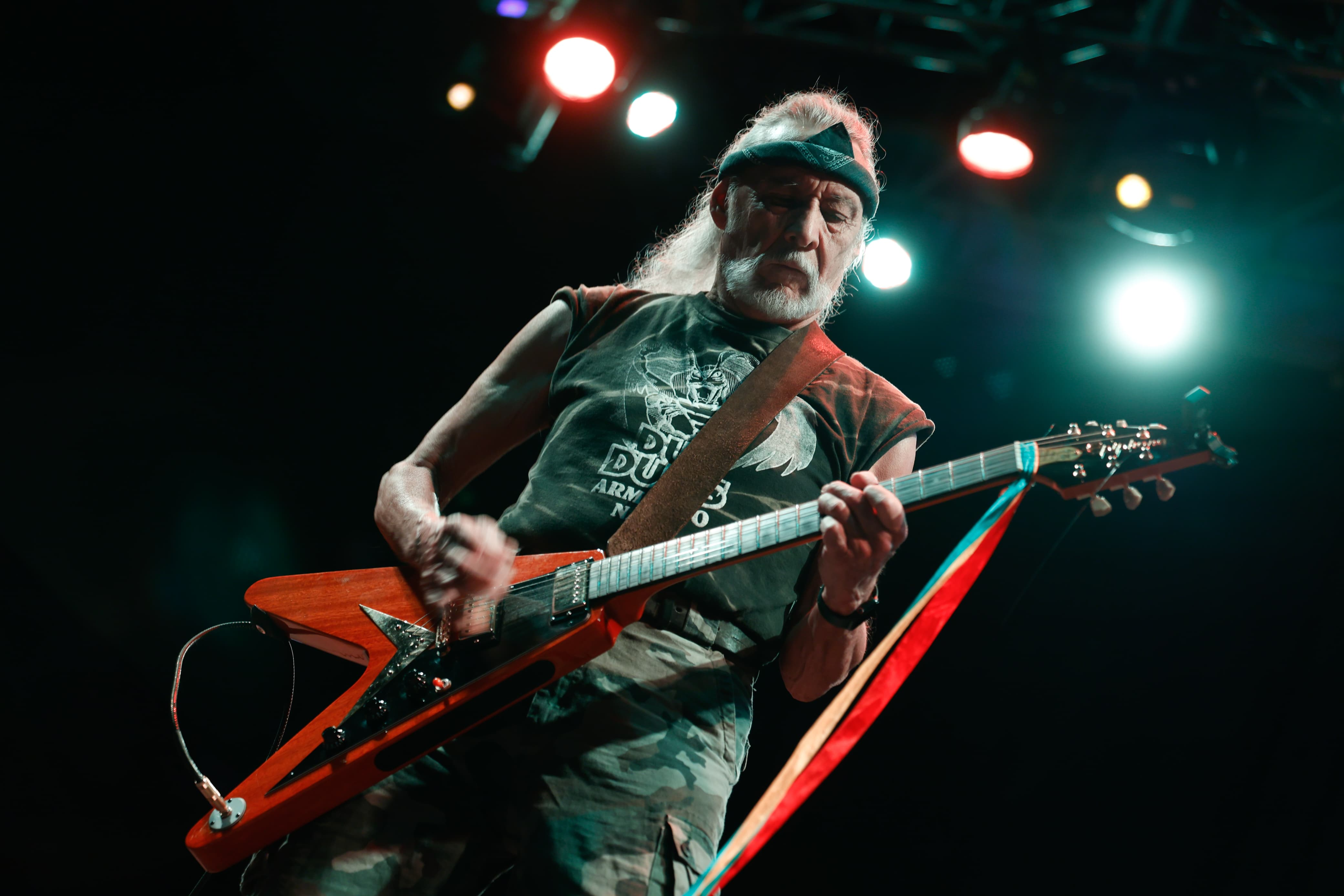
Dug Dug's Armando Nava in 2025.

Los Dug Dug's is a rock group from Durango, Mexico, best known for their work in the 1960s and early 1970s. Los Dug Dug's is one of the first Mexican bands to show The Beatles' influence, and noted as one of the first Mexican rock bands to write their own songs in English, as well as cover songs by British and American acts in English, breaking what had up to then been an unwritten rule in Mexican rock. The band continues to perform today.

== Sound ==
Los Dug Dug's "create a harrowing sonic universe that's at once expansive and claustrophobic, like some of your most memorable drug trips". They have been called "a fiery and exciting band of acid rock iconoclasts" and their music described as "fuzzy, epic psych-rock jams" and "swirling, wild psychedelia". When reissuing their self-titled debut, Light in the Attic Records referred to Armando Nava as a "psychedelic guru" and describes the record as a "heavy, explosive album, a record which captures the fever/dream humidity of flower children running amok on a July afternoon."

== History ==
=== Early years ===
In 1960, a seven-member rock 'n' roll band known as Xippos Rock was formed by high school students in Durango, Durango, Mexico. Roberto Miranda was lead guitarist, and Moises Munoz was the bass player. In college, they invited Armando Nava, whom they had frequently seen carrying a guitar on his bike, to join the band. Nava had a cousin, Jorge Luján, who was very close to him, and Nava taught him how to play the guitar. Later, a drummer, Sergio Orrante, joined the band, as did singer Francisco Alcalde. The final member, Jorge De La Torre, joined the band as a second singer.

The band did not have electric guitars or drums, so they performed using acoustic guitars with homemade pick-ups. For drums, they used a steel chair. Los Dug Dug's played at a local radio station with the chair and acoustic guitars, as well as at local events and theatres in Durango, such as Cine Principal. The songs played in the early years were covers from other Mexican rock bands such as Los Teen Tops, Los Locos Del Ritmo and Los Rebeldes del Rock. Nava and De La Torre emerged as the band's leaders after the original frontman quit.

Nava's father was a salesperson, and he moved the family to Tijuana. After a year or so, Nava wanted to go back to Durango and try to bring Xippos Rock to Tijuana. The band started playing in Mazatlan, in Obregon, Sonora, and at the request of Nava's father, their manager, Nava changed their name to Los Dug Dug's (for Durango, Durango) and continued their journey to Tijuana. It was here that Los Dug Dug's began to develop their English-language rock covers:

"During a brief visit to Texas, Nava purchased copies of the Beatles' earliest records and played them for the band."

The band's arrival at Tijuana marked the start of their rock career. At first they had to play at bars and strip clubs on both sides of the border. Soon they landed a regular gig at Mike's Bar, where they established their reputation. After two months in Tijuana, the drummer Orrante decided to go back to Durango and return to high school.

Los Dug Dug's were the first group to sing covers and original songs in English, creating what would be known as La Onda Chicana, a movement similar to other 1960s countercultural movements around the world. The artistic movement eventually included bands like Bandido, Three Souls in my Mind (currently known as El Tri), Peace and Love, and El Ritual.

=== From Tijuana to Mexico City ===
After "an extended stint as the house band at the Tijuana strip joint Fantasitas", Nava decided to move to Mexico City, where they started playing at El Harlem Cafe. They then moved to El Trip Cafe and Hullabulloo Cafe. During this time Nava and De La Torre became the only members to remain in the band.

They started making a name for themselves; as Alex Lora (from El Tri) has recalled, members of other bands would go to their shows and get ideas for their own. The success in Mexico City was so big that TV stations asked them to perform and record songs for their shows, especially kids' shows. "Chicotito si", a children's song, became their debut single. The band was signed to RCA and released several singles, including cover versions of "California Dreamin'" and "Hanky Panky."

The band returned to Tijuana in 1968 and played a regular gig at the club Sans Sous Ci. Here they were noticed by Frank Mangano, an American tourist, who paid for the band to move to New York City.

=== In New York City, return to Mexico City, and modern times ===
In late 1968, Los Dug Dug's—now consisting of Genaro Garcia as the bass player, Armando Nava playing guitar and keyboard, Jorge de la Torre as lead singer, Gustavo Garayzar as lead guitar, and Alberto Escoto on drums—moved to New York City, where they recorded some original songs at a recording studio. Nava recorded songs as a singer with studio musicians. The band was required to pay a $5,000 fee, in accordance with established rules by the local musician union, which was required of any acts at that time who wished to play larger venues in Manhattan.

The band returned to Mexico, but due to creative differences between Nava and de la Torre, de la Torre left the band. The album they were working on, their self-titled debut, appeared in 1971. The band appeared as a quartet, without De La Torre, at the Avándaro festival.

At this time, and with the departure of de la Torre, Los Dug Dug's were essentially no more. The singles "World of Love" and "Eclipse" from the album became Latin American hits, and in 1972, Nava started the group up again as a trio.

While pop groups in Latin America were singing in English, the band performed in Spanish on 1973's Smog:

The album would prove influential in at least one respect: many Mexican bands went back to singing in Spanish shortly thereafter. The era of English-language rock in Mexico was over, and the scene had been forced underground in the aftermath of the Avandaro festival.

For 1975's Cambia Cambia, Los Dug Dug's adopted a well-groomed, clean look, in contrast to other Latin American acts which leaned toward singing in English and wearing long hair and beards. Despite stylistic innovations, the RCA label under which they were working did not expend great effort with publicity and support for the act, and their 1978 release, El Loco, was their last work at that time.

Since then, Nava has kept the band going in various incarnations with multiple lineup changes, based out of Mexico City. They most often perform at Nava's club, La Reunion. Their reputation stands today as being largely responsible for Mexican rock music and the first and arguably most popular of their kind.

== In popular culture ==
- The band makes a brief appearance in the novel Xico by Mexican author Gustavo Vázquez-Lozano.
- Their music features prominently in The Grand Tour Colombia Special (series 3, episodes 2 and 3).
- Their song "Smog" was featured on the in-game radio for the game Just Cause 4.
- Their song "Yo No Sé" was featured in the end credits of season 2 episode 10 in the American mockumentary comedy horror What We Do In The Shadows.
- Their song "Lost In My World" was featured in the opening scene of Narcos: Mexico season 3 episode 6.
- Their song "Yo No Sé" was featured in the opening scene of BMF season 4 episode 1.

== Selected discography ==
Studio albums

- Dug Dug's (RCA Victor, 1971)
- Smog (RCA Victor, 1973)
- Cambia, cambia (RCA Camden, 1975)
- El loco (RCA Camden, 1978)

Compilation albums

- 15 éxitos de los Dug Dug's (RCA Camden, 1985)
- Abre tu mente (RCA Victor, 1985)
