= La Voz Peru =

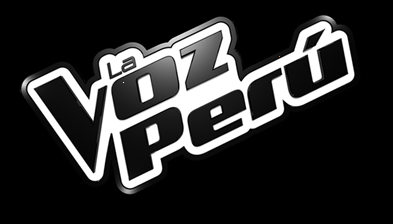
- Also known as: The Voice Peru
- Genre: Talent show
- Created by: John de Mol Jr.
- Based on: The Voice Of Holland
- Presented by: Cristian Rivero; Diego Ubierna; Jesús Alzamora; Karen Schwarz
- Judges: Eva Ayllón; Jerry Rivera; José Luis Rodríguez; Kalimba; Alex Lora; Gian Marco Zignago; Luis Enrique; Daniela Darcourt; Guillermo Dávila; Mike Bahía; Christian Yaipén; Noel Schajris; Maricarmen Marín; Raúl Romero; Mauricio Mesones; Yahir; Pablo Alborán; Kendall Schmidt
- Country of origin: Peru
- Original language: Spanish
- No. of seasons: 6 (19 More On Panamericana)
- No. of episodes: 190

Production
- Production locations: Lima, Peru
- Running time: 120 min.
- Production companies: Rayo en la Botella; Talpa (2013–2015); ITV Studios (2021–2023); Netflix (2026-present)

Original release
- Network: Latina Televisión
- Release: 30 September 2013 – 18 December 2015
- Release: 14 June 2021 – 18 March 2023
- Network: Panamericana Televisión

Related
- The Voice franchise La Voz Kids Perú

La Voz Perú (English: The Voice Peru or The Voice of Peru) is a Peruvian reality talent show that premiered on Latina Televisión on September 30, 2013. It is based on the original The Voice of Holland and is part of an international franchise created by Dutch television producer John de Mol Jr..

== History ==
The Voice format was devised by John de Mol Jr., creator of Big Brother, and unlike other singing talent shows, only the voice potential will be evaluated without giving importance to the physical appearance of the participants.

This is a foreign format, produced in different parts of the world with great success in 2011. Peru will voice a jury of four professionals who show their back to the participants and will hear them sing. When one of them likes what they hear, the coaches in question will press a button and your chair will turn, making it the "godfather" of the contestant.

The novelty of this show is the dynamics of the program. Unlike other contests of song, this version added an ingredient of coaches, who will be four remain turned on during the performance of the participants. Thus, only from the voice, each coach will select what participants you want for your team.

Thus, the contest will be divided into different phases: the instance of a "blind" song, the selection and the duel between teams prepared for special galas shows and live performances.

== Format ==
La Voz Perú is to choose between a group of contestants, of different ages, those who stand out for their vocal qualities without image influence the decision of the coaches, composed of well-known artists who later directed their education. This format aims to try to find the best voice in Peru.

=== Blind auditions ===
In the Blind auditions, each coach completes a team of artists by using only the sense of hearing, being unable to see them. Within ninety seconds, coaches must decide whether they want the participant for their team or not. If several coaches wish to have the same contestant, the last word is of the participant. Once the teams are formed, each coach will be responsible to train the artists for the second phase. In the fourth season, a new element was added, the "Block" button, which allows a coach to block another to prevent them from recruiting the artist on its team. Each coach has granted three blocks to use in the entire stage.

=== Battles ===
In the Battles, each coach will put two (or three, rarely) of their participants head-to-head singing a song together. Both singers should shine in a duet (or trio) and the coach will decide which of them is the winner of the battle. The winners of these battles advance to the next stage. In season two, "Steals" were added, this allows another coach to save another artist from another team who lose the battle. However, in the fourth season, "Steal" was removed in this round. The "Steals" returned the following season, where coaches can save only one artist from another team.

=== Sing-offs ===
From season one through three, in the Sing-offs every coach must save six participants to send them directly to the live shows so that the three missing have to sing in front of the coach the song performed in blind auditions, thus, the coach will save two and will have to eliminate the other to reach the live show with eight participants each team.

=== Knockouts ===
This was introduced in the fourth season, replacing the Sing-offs. In this round, coaches would group the artist into pairs and will sing the song of the artist's choice, and the coach will choose one artist to proceed to the next round. Also, "Steals" were added in this round, allowing another coach to save the losing artist from another team.

=== Live shows ===
In the live shows, each coach will assess their team members weekly, and after the performances, some are saved by the public and others by their coach. In the finale, they not only present songs solo, but each finalist also performs a duet with her coach. The final word is from the public, which enshrines one of the four finalists to be the voice of Peru.

== Coaches ==
On Saturday, 3 August 2013, the official list of the four coaches of La Voz Perú was released: Puerto Rican singer Jerry Rivera, Mexican pop singer Kalimba, Venezuelan singer José Luis "El Puma" Rodríguez, and Peruvian singer Eva Ayllón. The panel remained for the series' second season, in 2014.

On Monday, 10 August 2015, a new coaching panel was revealed for the third season: returning coach Eva Ayllón, Nicaraguan singer Luis Enrique, Mexican rock singer Álex Lora, and Peruvian singer Gian Marco Zignago.

In May 2021, Latina Televisión confirmed a new season of La Voz Perú. New coaches Mike Bahía, Daniela Darcourt, and Guillermo Dávila join original coach, Ayllón.

On 4 April 2022, Latina Televisión announced via the official La Voz Perú Facebook profile the coaches for the fifth season. Christian Yaipén and Noel Schajris are the new coaches, while Darcourt and Ayllón return as coaches from last season.

In January 2023, it was announced that the coaches for the sixth season will feature returning coach Ayllón, The Voice Kids coach Maricarmen Marín, The Voice Senior coach Raúl Romero, and new coach Mauricio Mesones.

=== Line-up of coaches ===
Coaches' line-up by chairs order
| Year | Coaches | | | |
| Year | 1 | 2 | 3 | 4 |
|---|---|---|---|---|
| 1 | Puma | Kalimba | Jerry | Eva |
| 2 | Puma | Eva | Jerry | Kalimba |
| 3 | Alex | Gian | Eva | Luis |
| 4 | Daniela | Guillermo | Mike | Eva |
| 5 | Daniela | Noel | Eva | Christian |
| 6 | Maricarmen | Raúl | Eva | Mauricio |

Former coaches

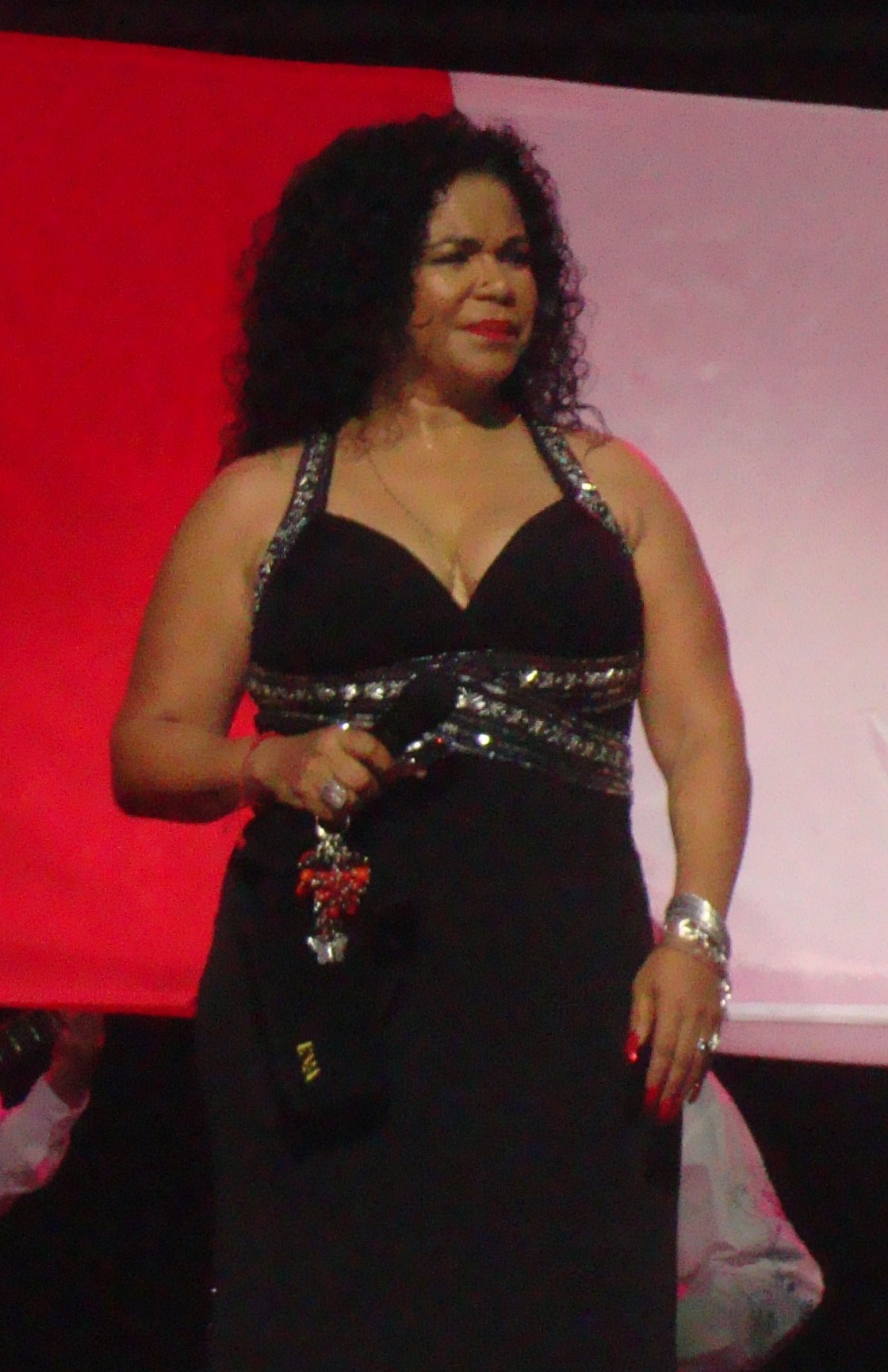
Eva Ayllón (2013–2023)

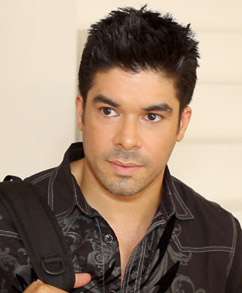
Jerry Rivera (2013–2014)

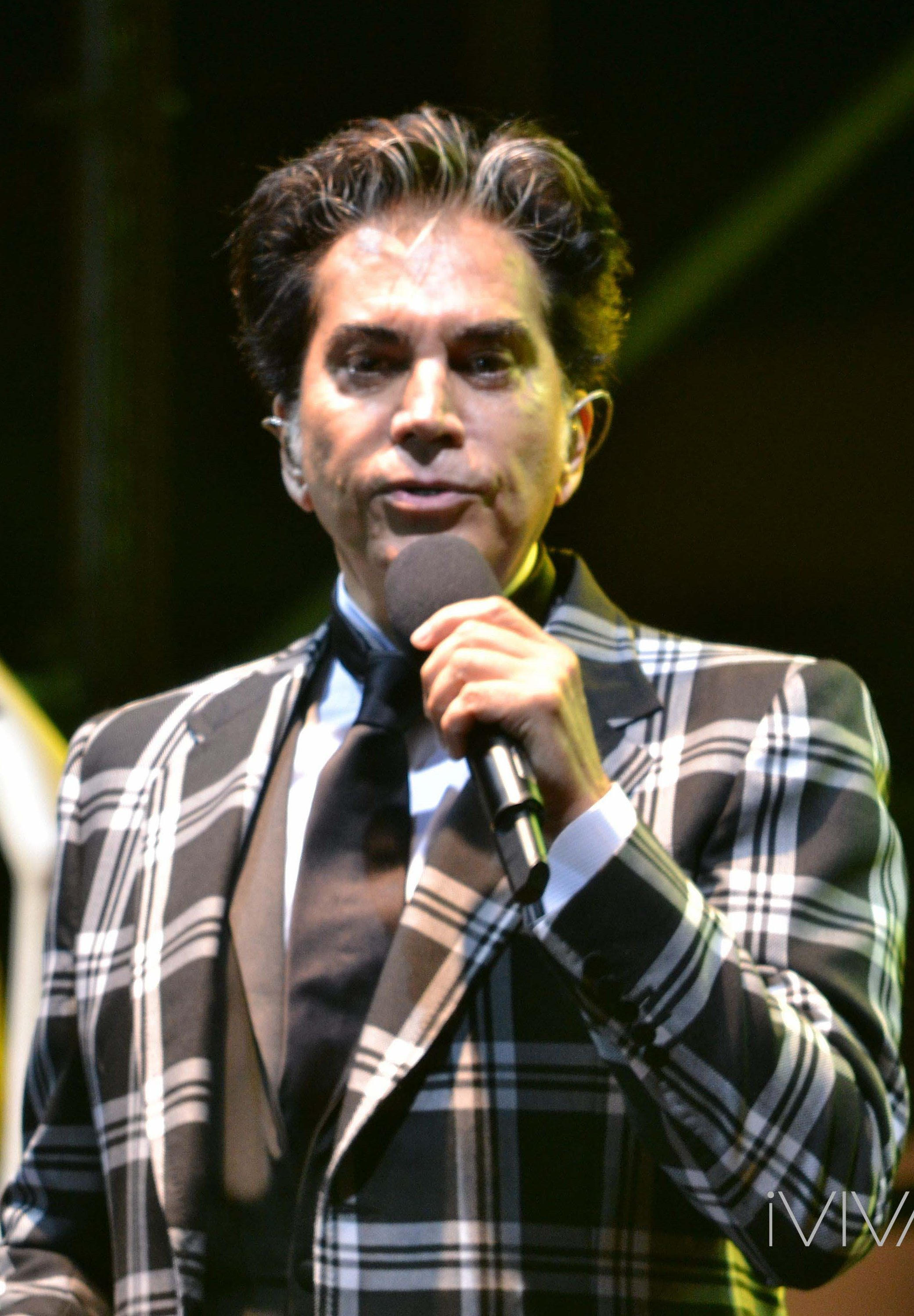
José Luis Rodríguez (2013–2014)

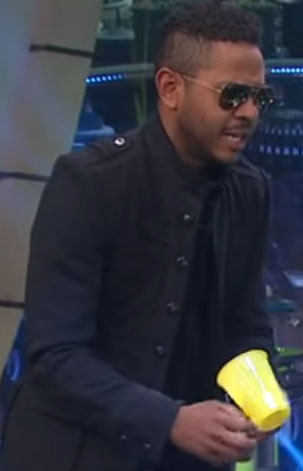
Kalimba (2013–2014)

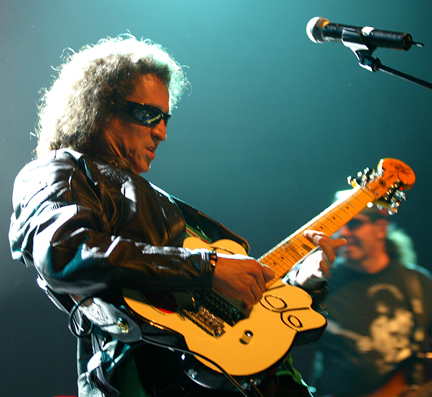
Álex Lora (2015)

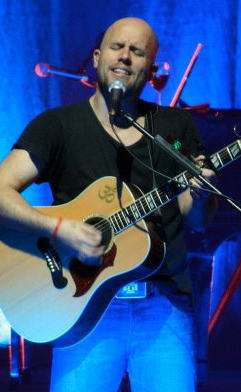
Gian Marco Zignago (2015)

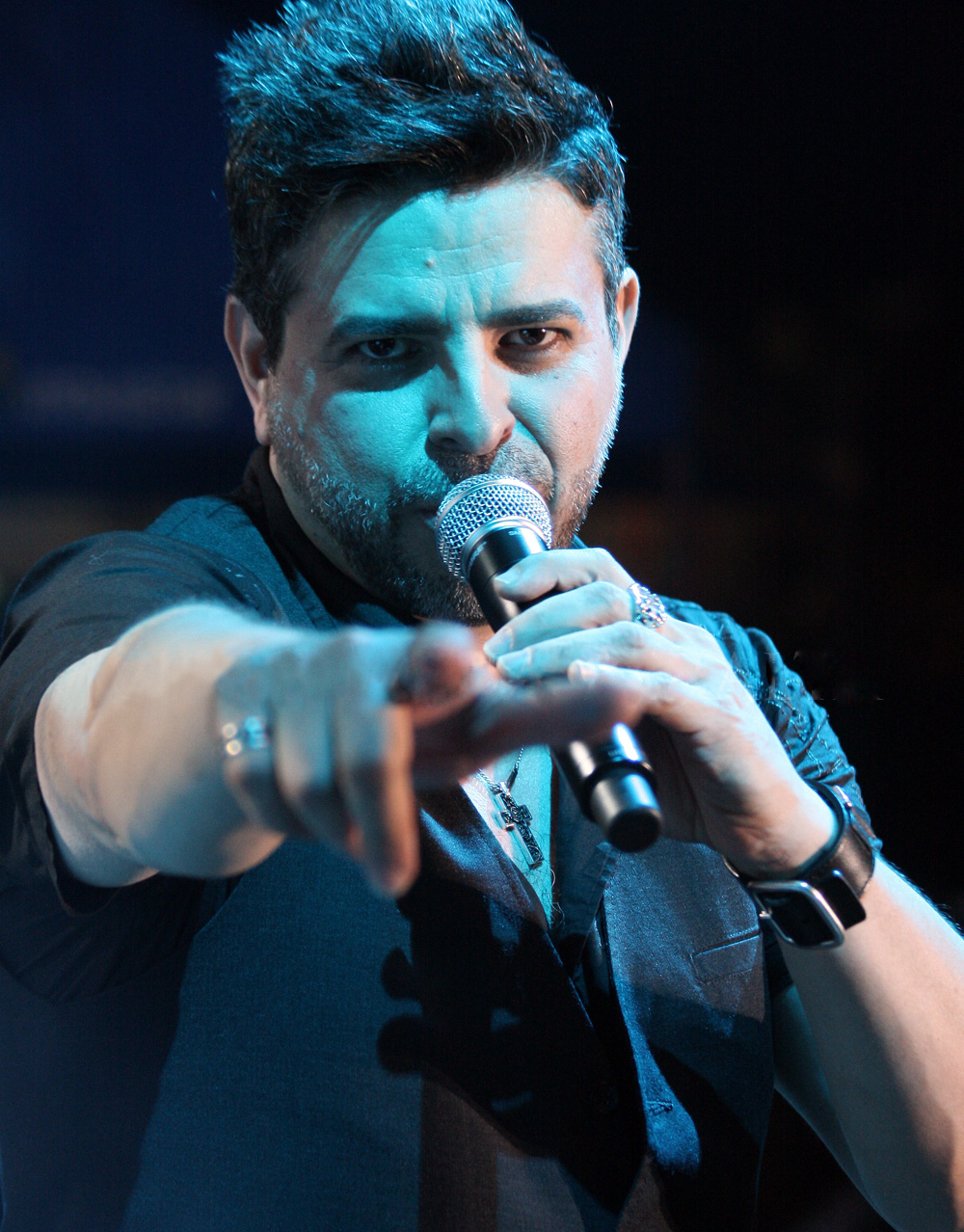
Luis Enrique (2015)

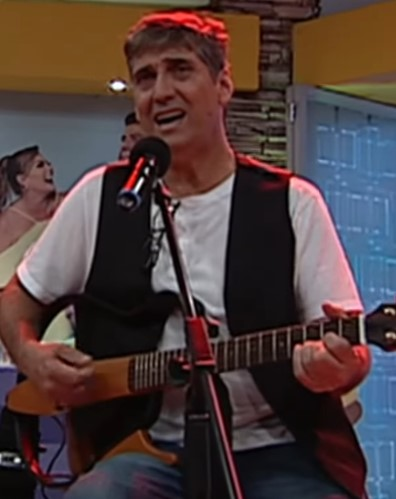
Guillermo Dávila (2021)

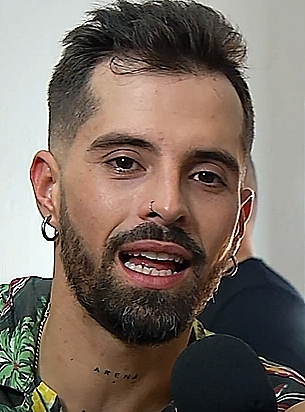
Mike Bahía (2021)

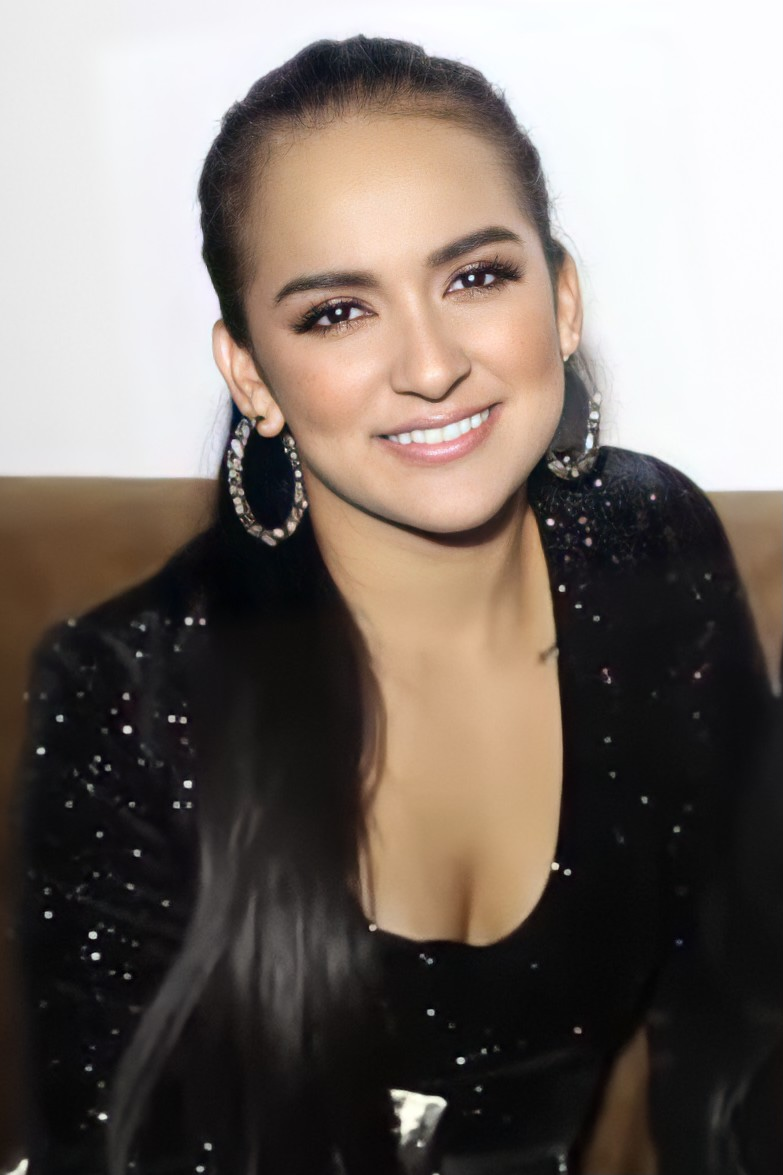
Daniela Darcourt (2021–2022)

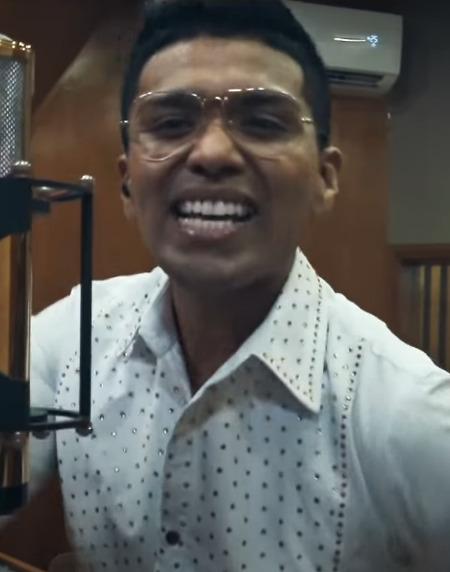
Christian Yaipén (2022)

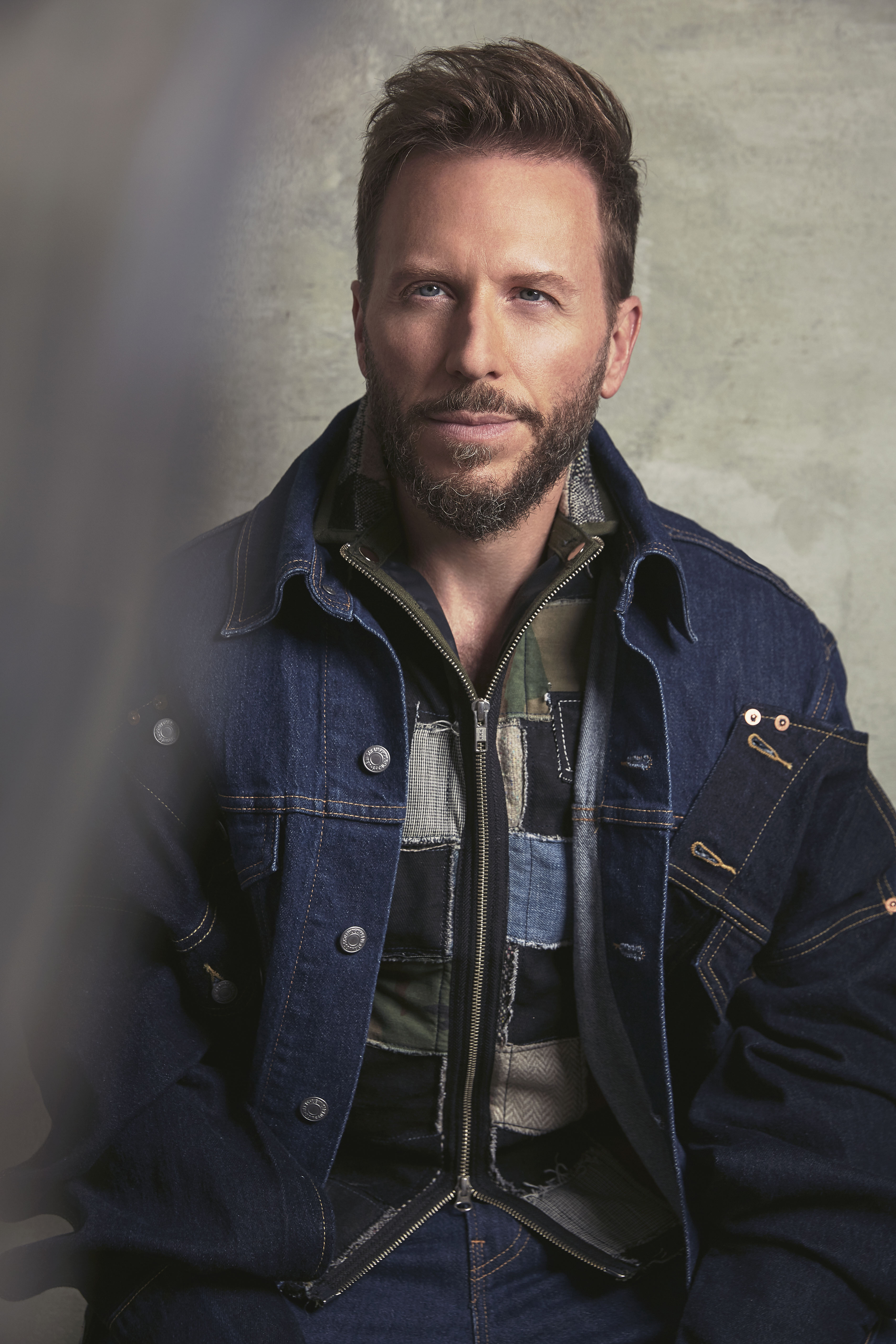
Noel Schajris (2022)

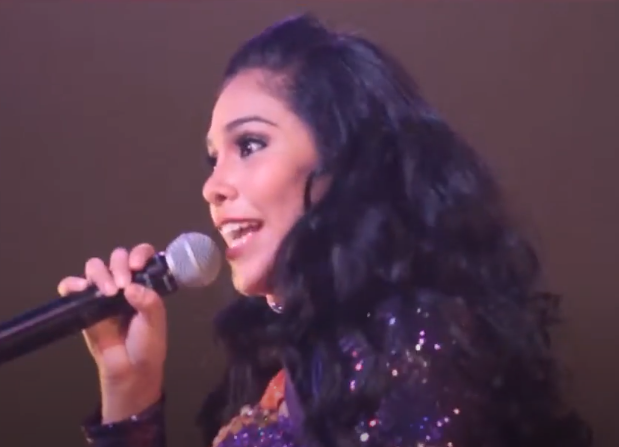
Maricarmen Marín (2023)

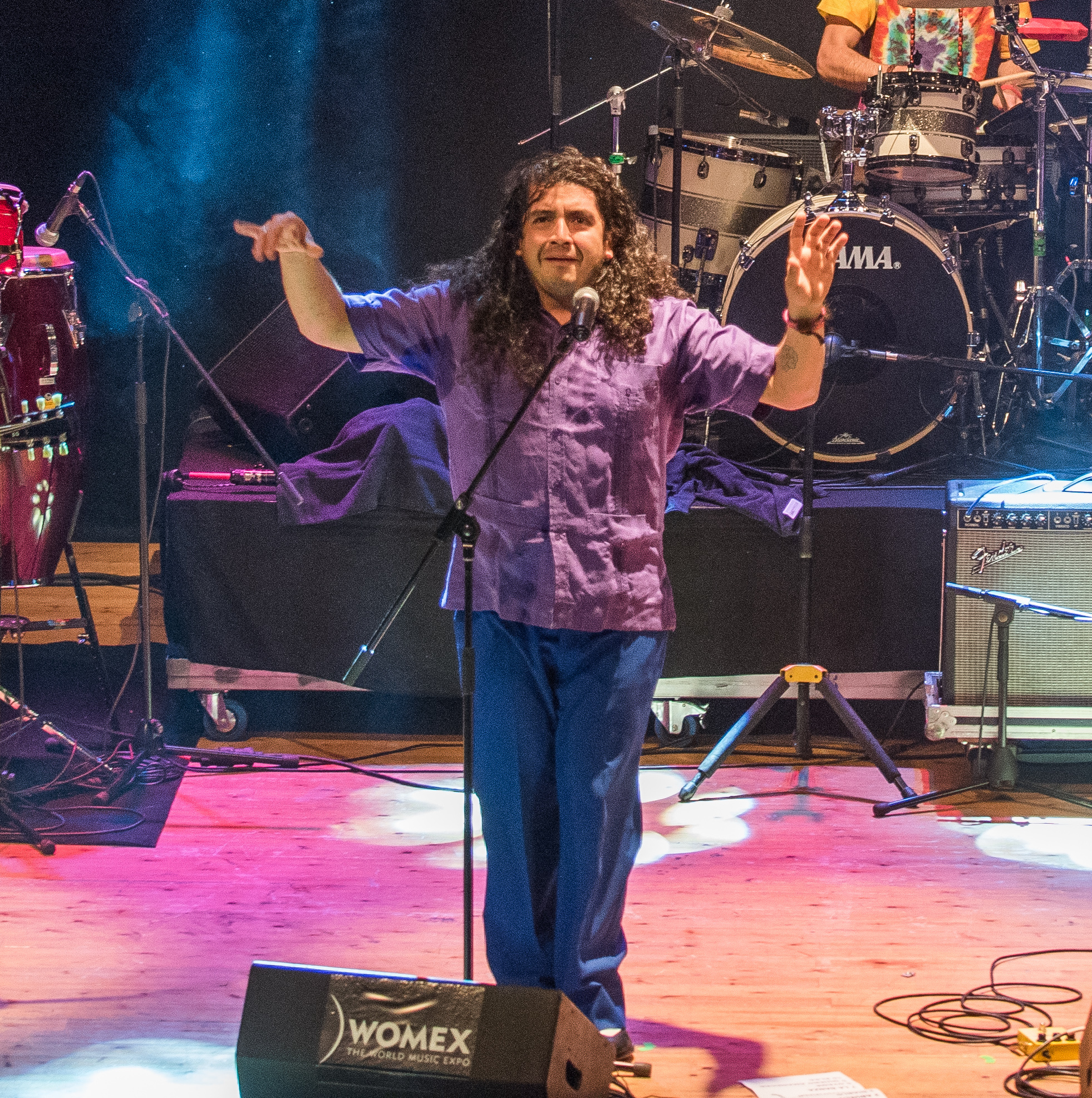
Mauricio Mesones (2023)

=== Coaches' teams ===
Winner
Runner-up
Third place
Fourth place

| Season | Coaches and contestants | | | |
| 1 | Team Puma | Team Kalimba | Team Jerry | Team Eva |
|---|---|---|---|---|
| 1 | Daniel Lazo; Alejandro Guerrero; Claudia Serpa; Jhonatan Sánchez | Michael Abanto; Fico Mau; Claudio Urrutia; Silvana Del Campo | Karolina Cruz; Alejandra Alfaro; Jeremy Gómez; Cielo Torres | Javier Arias; Aldo Riccio; Stephanie Chaparro; Leo Rengifo |
| 2 | Team Puma | Team Eva | Team Jerry | Team Kalimba |
| 2 | Martin Tremolada; Juliana Molina; José Gaona; Cristian Tasilla | Ronald Arteta; Noelia Calle; Maricruz Bisso; Raúl Fernandez | Ruby Palomino; Glenizaida Almánzar; Renzo Vásquez; Gabriela Zambrano | Teresa Medrano; Miguel Laporte; Álvaro Rivera; Angélica Pineda |
| 3 | Team Álex | Team Gian | Team Eva | Team Luis |
| 3 | Yamilet de la Jara; Franco Cáceres; Steph Red; Jefferson Tadeo | Susan Ochoa; Diego Chavez; Luis Alcazar; Grecia Cadillo | Jair Mendoza; Ángela Begazo; Robinson Vidal; Pamela Abanto | Jairo Tafur; Roberto Herrera; Cedric Vidal; Kate Higa |
| 4 | Team Daniela | Team Guillermo | Team Mike | Team Eva |
| 4 | Aldair Sánchez; Sebastian Palma; Joaquina Carruitero; Jair Montaño; Javo; Grace Morales; Freddy Armas; Jean Paul Moreno | Marcela Navarro; Fito Flores; Sebastian Mahle; Emanuel Rivera; Edu Baluarte; Oriana Montero; Miluska Eskenazi; Joseph Buitrón | Randy Feijoo; Jeyko Atoche; Iván MC; Nicolle Manrique; Stefano Grande; Jesús Zaez; Karin Idol; Paula Leonardi | Valeria Zapata; Thony Valencia; Lucy Young; Milena Warthon; Giani Méndez; Narda Pumarada; Carmen Marina; Natasha Hernández |
| 5 | Team Daniela | Team Noel | Team Eva | Team Christian |
| 5 | Beik; Tesania Castro-Pozo; Danielle; Gabriela Salazar | Veruska Verdú; Coti Loyola; Briela; Vanessa Cardiu | Lita Pezo; Arturo Sonero; Carmen Castro; Gretell Sanabia | Edu Lecca; Fernanda Rivera; Sandra Saldaña; Deyker Alexander |
| 6 | Team Maricarmen | Team Raúl | Team Eva | Team Mauricio |
| 6 | Lucero López; María Paola; Giani Méndez; Grace Morales | Asmir Young; Richie Ramírez; Arnold Alcántara; Frank Ariel | Lucy Young; Jhon Camacho; Dimas Ysla; Fabián Quiala | Luis Manuel; Joss Quintana; Celima Victoria; Edmary Gómez |

== Series overview ==
Warning: the following table presents a significant amount of different colors.

La Voz Perú series overview
| Season | Aired | Winner | Runner-up | Third place | Fourth place | Winning coach | Presenters |
|---|---|---|---|---|---|---|---|
| 1 | 2013 | Daniel Lazo | Javier Arias | Michael Abanto | Karolina Cruz | José Luis Rodríguez | Cristian Rivero, Diego Ubierna |
| 2 | 2014 | Ruby Palomino | Martin Tremolada | Teresa Medrano | Ronald Arteta | Jerry Rivera | Cristian Rivero, Diego Ubierna |
| 3 | 2015 | Yamilet de Jara | Susan Ochoa | Jairo Tafur | Jair Mendoza | Álex Lora | Rivero, Jesús Alzamora |
| 4 | 2021 | Marcela Navarro | Randy Feijoo | Valeria Zapata | Aldair Sánchez | Guillermo Dávila | Rivero, Karen Schwarz |
| 5 | 2022 | Lita Pezo | Edu Lecca | Veruska Vurdú | Beik | Eva Ayllón | Rivero, Karen Schwarz |
| 6 | 2023 | Luis Manuel | Lucero López | Asmir Young | Lucy Young | Mauricio Mesones | Alzamora, María Paz |

== Kids edition ==
La Voz Kids is a Peruvian singing competition produced by Rayo in collaboration with Talpa Media, aired on Latina Televisión on 13 January 2014. After the success of La Voz Perú, Latina Televisión launched an advertisement preparing a children's version, which had already been broadcast in other countries under the format of The Voice Kids. The Peruvian La Voz Kids began recording in November 2013. The show focuses on choosing between a group of children from 8 to 14 years old that stand out for their vocal qualities, with their looks not influencing the decision of the coaches – who are made up of well-known artists who mentor the children. The first three seasons were hosted by Cristian Rivero. Also hosting, the first season counted with Almendra Gomelsky; Gigi Mitre for the second season, and Katia Condos for the third. The coaches for the first season were Peruvian folklore singer Eva Ayllón, Mexican pop singer Kalimba, and Peruvian pop singer Anna Carina. Luis Enrique replaced Kalimba in the third season. The reboot of the La Voz Perú came with a fourth season for the kids. The fourth season started to be broadcast on 19 October 2021, with Ayllón coming back as a coach alongside Christian Yaipén, Daniela Darcourt, and Joey Montana. Rivero was joined by Gianella Neyra to host the show. For the fifth season that began broadcasting in 2022, Rivero returned as host and was joined by Karen Schwarz. Ayllón returned as a coach with new coaches Víctor Muñoz, Ezio Oliva, and Maricarmen Marín.

=== Series overview ===
Warning: the following table presents a significant amount of different colors.

Peruvian La Voz Kids series overview
| Season | Aired | Winner | Runner-up | Third place | Fourth place | Winning coach | Presenters | | Coaches (chairs' order) | | | |
| Season | Aired | Winner | Runner-up | Third place | Fourth place | Winning coach | Presenters | | 1 | 2 | 3 | 4 |
|---|---|---|---|---|---|---|---|---|---|---|---|---|
| 1 | 2014 | Amy Gutiérrez | Sebastián Reategui | Valeria Zapata | No fourth finalist | Kalimba | Cristian Rivero | Almendra Gomelsky | Eva | Kalimba | Anna | No fourth coach |
| 2 | 2015 | Sofía Hernández | D'Angelo Perez | Fabrizio Gálvez | No fourth finalist | Kalimba | Cristian Rivero | Gigi Mitre | Eva | Kalimba | Anna | No fourth coach |
| 3 | 2016 | Nicolás Parra | Nicole Rosa | Úrsula Eyzaguirre | No fourth finalist | Anna Carina | Cristian Rivero | Katia Condos | Luis | Eva | Anna | No fourth coach |
| 4 | 2021 | Gianfranco Bustios | Ángelo Villanueva | César Vicente | Fernanda Rivera | Daniela Darcourt | Cristian Rivero | Gianella Neyra | Christian | Eva | Joey | Daniela |
| 5 | 2022 | Gianmarco Morales | Stive Kidman | Facu | Douglas Mogollón | Víctor Muñoz | Cristian Rivero | Karen Schwarz | Víctor | Eva | Ezio | Maricarmen |

=== Coaches' timeline ===
| Coach | Seasons | | | | |
| Coach | 1 | 2 | 3 | 4 | 5 |
|---|---|---|---|---|---|
| Eva Ayllón | | | | | |
| Anna Carina | | | | | |
| Kalimba | | | | | |
| Luis Enrique | | | | | |
| Christian Yaipén | | | | | |
| Daniela Darcourt | | | | | |
| Joey Montana | | | | | |
| Maricarmen Marín | | | | | |
| Ezio Oliva | | | | | |
| Víctor Muñoz | | | | | |

Coaches gallery

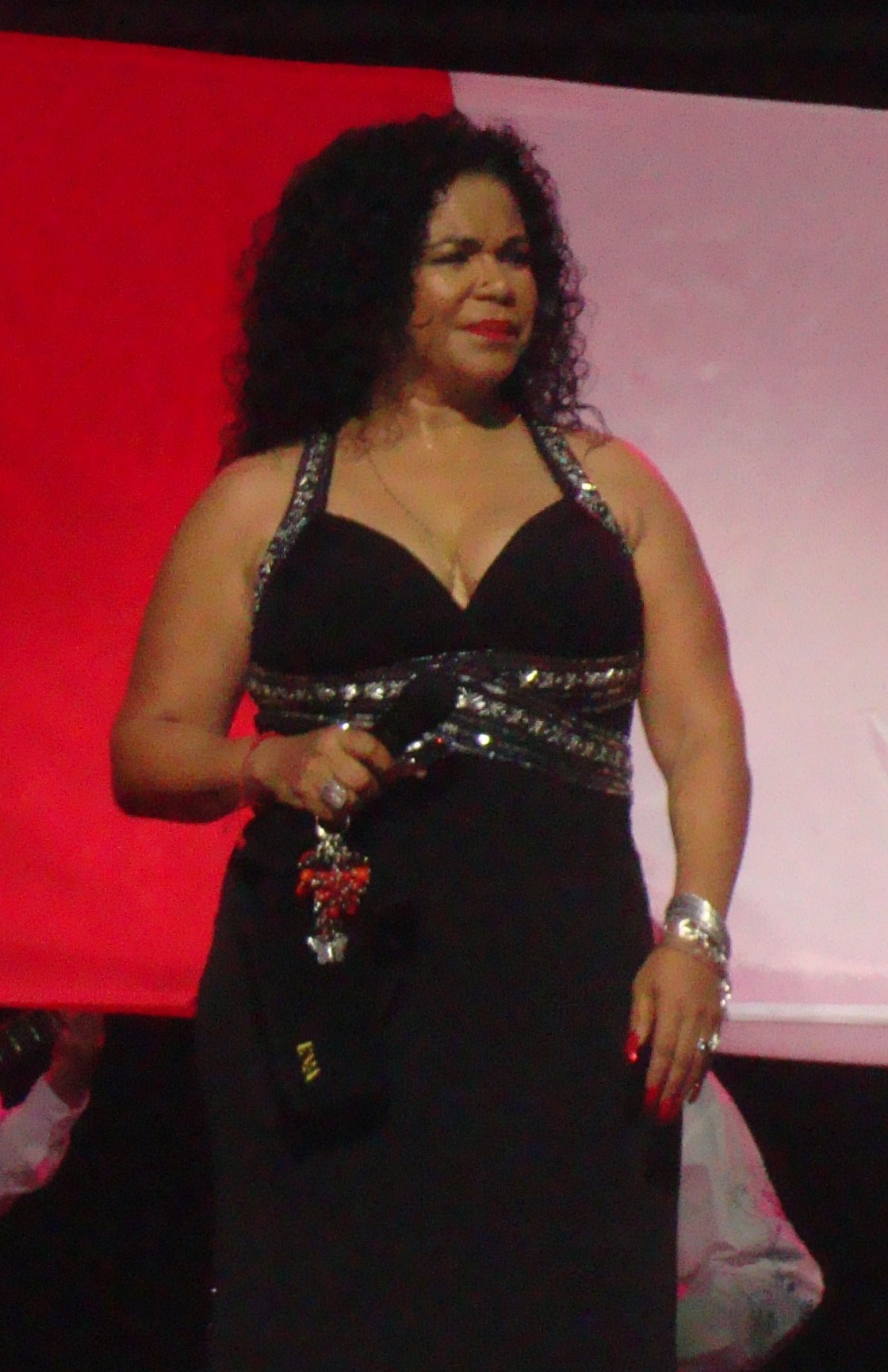
Eva Ayllón (2014–2016, 2021–2022)

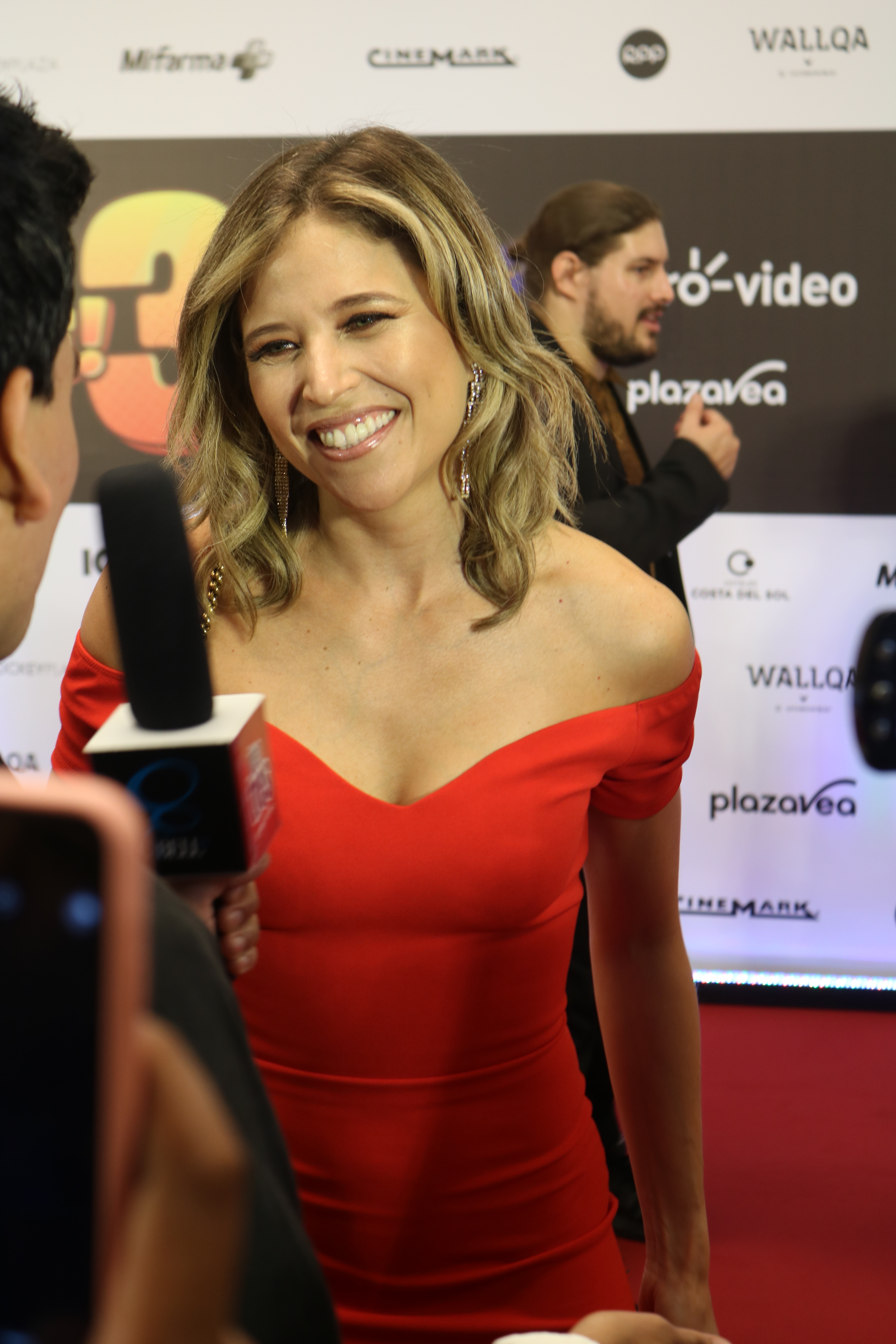
Anna Carina (2014–2016)

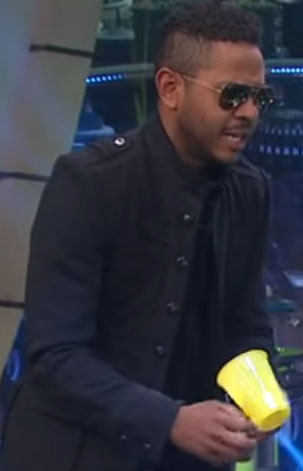
Kalimba (2014–2015)

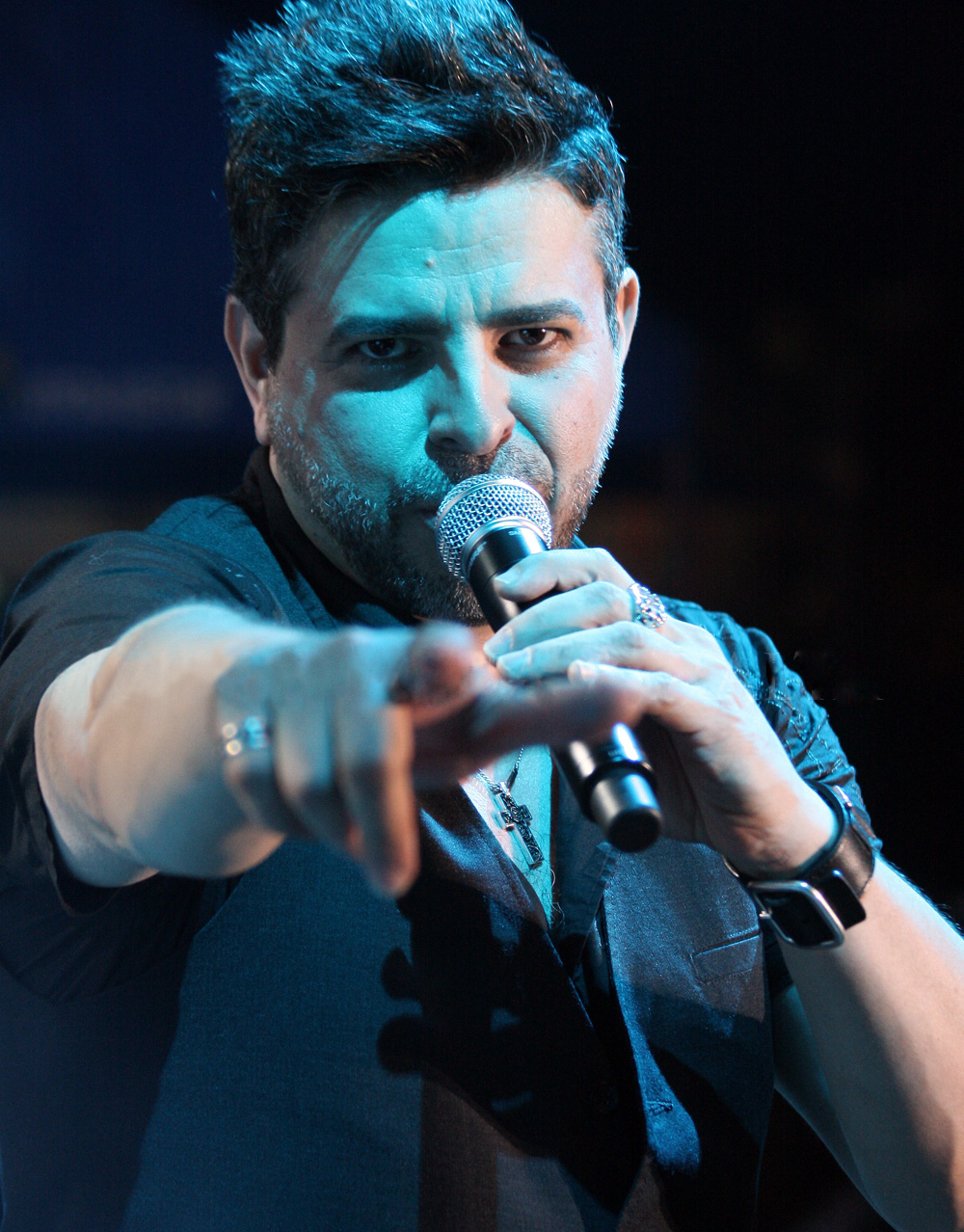
Luis Enrique (2016)

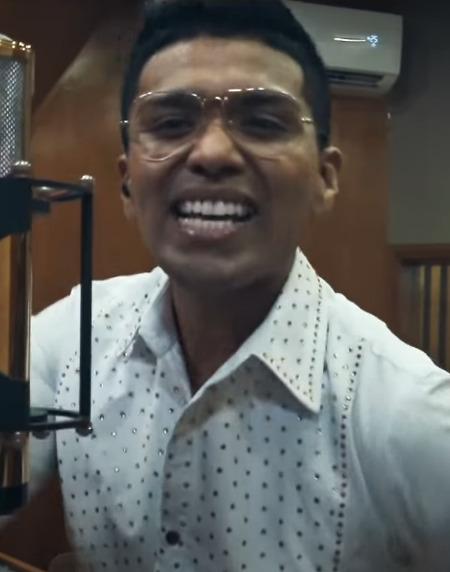
Christian Yaipén (2021)

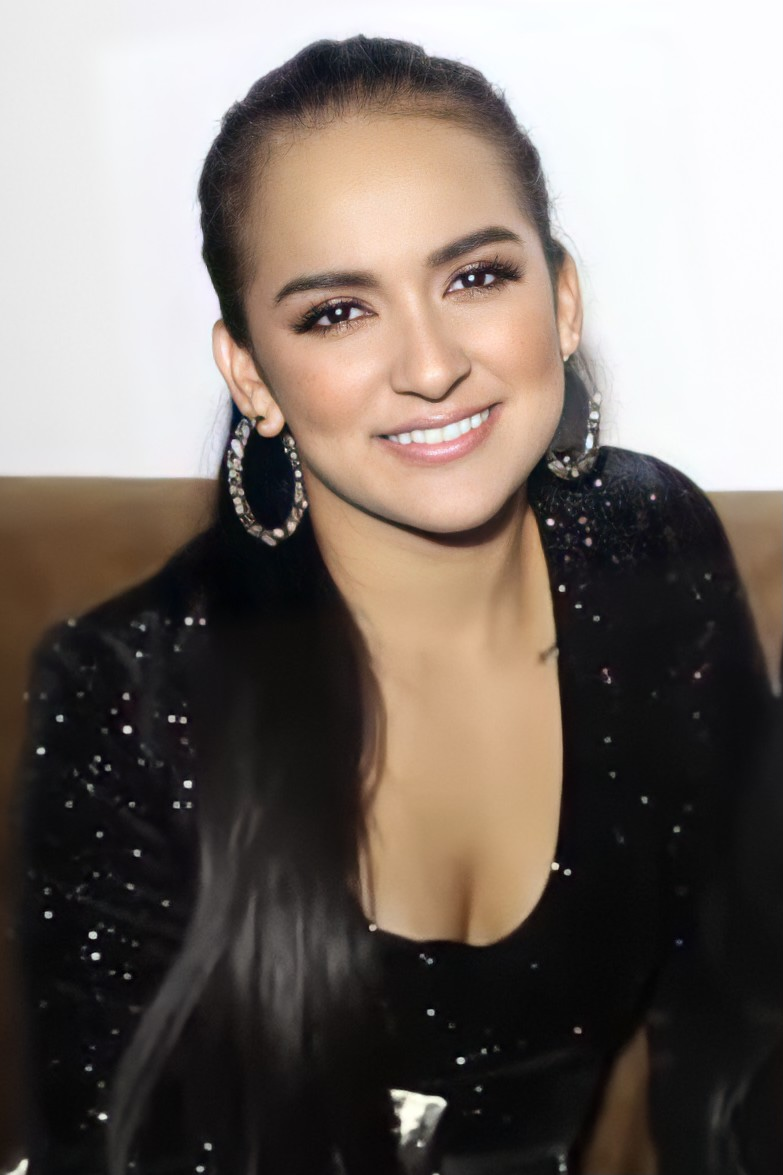
Daniela Darcourt (2021)

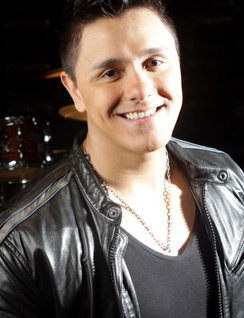
Joey Montana (2021)

Víctor Muñoz (2022)

Ezio Oliva (2022)

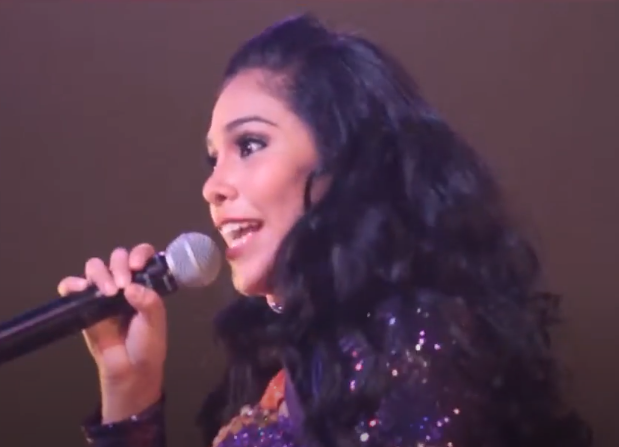
Maricarmen Marín (2022)

=== Teams ===
| Season | Eva Ayllón | Kalimba | Anna Carina | —N/a |
|---|---|---|---|---|
| 1 | Valeria Zapata; Erick Napa; Jessica Narváez; Mauricio Ormeño; Josué Aldave; Kevin Villaverde; Adela Padilla; Ariana Stisin; Bárbara Tipian; Antonella Montalvo; Maryuri Peña; Rudy Cabrera; Jean Pool Meléndez; Nancy Godoy; Víctor García; Diego Rubio; Marjorie Godoy; Luz Manchego | Amy Gutiérrez; Camila Castillo; Sandra Saldaña; Miguel Ángel Rodríguez; Michael Villar; Dayana Pauccar; Sonalí Oré; Nicolás Orejuela; Sally Macedo; Killa Tupayachi; Daniela Prado; Ariana Roggero; Vanessa Angúlo; Dayana Campos; Marcia Acasiete; Marianélida Baca; Dayana León; Paola Egusquiza | Sebastián Reátegui; Francesca Siche; Tiffany Terrones; Gonzalo Kujón; Shania Lazo; Nicole Tudela; Camila Yanqui; Tatiana Medina; Olga Juárez; Dulce Nicole; Karimé Castillo; Renato Valdivia; Grecia Huertas; Nayeli Ramírez; Daniela Lam; Alexandra Fernández; Yalú Olaya; Valeria Vertiz | —N/a |
| 2 | D'Angelo Perez; Amanda Legario; Nicole Salinas; Daniela Aybar; Daniela Balbuena; Rocío Soto; María De Los Angeles; Brenda Morí; Eva María Huertas; Celeste Manrique; Rocío Miranda; Nathaly Gutiérrez; Karely Maza; Cristian Alcázar | Sofia Hernández; María Fe Velito; Ana Paula Vera Tudela; Lucero Koyama; Nathaly Esquerre; Luna Chavarri; Camila Dellepiane; Kiara Álvarez; Clenith Coaquira; Erika Rivas; Natalia Salinas; Leslie Figueroa; Meylin Sullon; Jesús Rojas | Fabrizio Galvez; Noelani Aspiros; Luis Roldan; Brenda Torres; Anali Leon; Aracelly del Carmen; María Gracia Delgado; Luz Chávez; Melanie Caldas; Renato Yáñez; Aracely Taboada; Karina Mendoza; Daniela Ahón; Shirell De La Cruz | —N/a |
| 3 | Luis Enrique | Eva Ayllón | Anna Carina | —N/a |
| 3 | Úrsula Eyzaguirre; Marcelo García; Esmeralda Díaz; Ángelica Dávila; Jair Montaño; Francisco Vidal | Nicole La Rosa; Jack León; Camila Lizarribar; Anely Dávila; Aarón Guerrero; Willy Pisco | Nicolás Parra; Flavia Pajuelo; Gianella Quezada; David Chávez; Luciana Ríos; María Fernanda Dámazo | —N/a |
| 4 | Christian Yaipén | Eva Ayllón | Joey Montana | Daniela Darcourt |
| 4 | Angelo Villanueva; Luna Vásquez; Paulina Villalobos | César Vicente; Sabrina Quintana; Cielo Sánchez | Fernanda Rivera; Vincenzo Leonardi; Stiven Franco | Gianfranco Bustios; Lucía Grundy; Fiorella Caballero |
| 5 | Victor Muñoz | Eva Ayllón | Ezio Oliva | Maricarmen Marín |
| 5 | Gianmarco Morales; Lucciana Vega; Camila Giménez | Facu; Alice Belleza; Thiago Castañeda | Douglas Mogollón; Victoria Camacho; Dariana Rodríguez | Stive Kidman; Alfrelith Urquiola; Kamila Bolívar |

== Senior edition ==
La Voz Senior is a Peruvian singing competition produced by Rayo in collaboration with Talpa Media, that began airing on Latina Televisión in August 2021. The debut season was hosted by Cristian Rivero, and had Eva Ayllón, Daniela Darcourt, Tony Succar, and the duo Pimpinela as coaches. The second season began airing in August 2022 with Ayllón and Darcourt returning as coaches. They were joined by new coaches René Farrait and Raúl Romero.

=== Series overview ===
Peruvian La Voz Senior series overview
| Season | Aired | Winner | Runner-up | Third place | Fourth place | Winning coach | Presenters | Coaches (chairs' order) | | | |
| Season | Aired | Winner | Runner-up | Third place | Fourth place | Winning coach | Presenters | 1 | 2 | 3 | 4 |
|---|---|---|---|---|---|---|---|---|---|---|---|
| 1 | 2021 | Mito Plaza | Lourdes Carhuas | Luis Ángel Reddel | Oscar Centeno | Pimpinela | Cristian Rivero, Karen Schwarz | Daniela | Pimpinela | Eva | Tony |
| 2 | 2022 | Javier Carranza | Otoniel Darío | Ana María Rossi | Sonia Bertha | Eva Ayllón | Cristian Rivero, Karen Schwarz | Daniela | René | Eva | Raúl |

=== Coaches' timeline ===
| Coach | Seasons | |
| Coach | 1 | 2 |
|---|---|---|
| Eva Ayllón | | |
| Daniela Darcourt | | |
| Tony Succar | | |
| Pimpinela | | |
| Raúl Romero | | |
| René Farrait | | |

=== Coaches' gallery ===
Coaches gallery

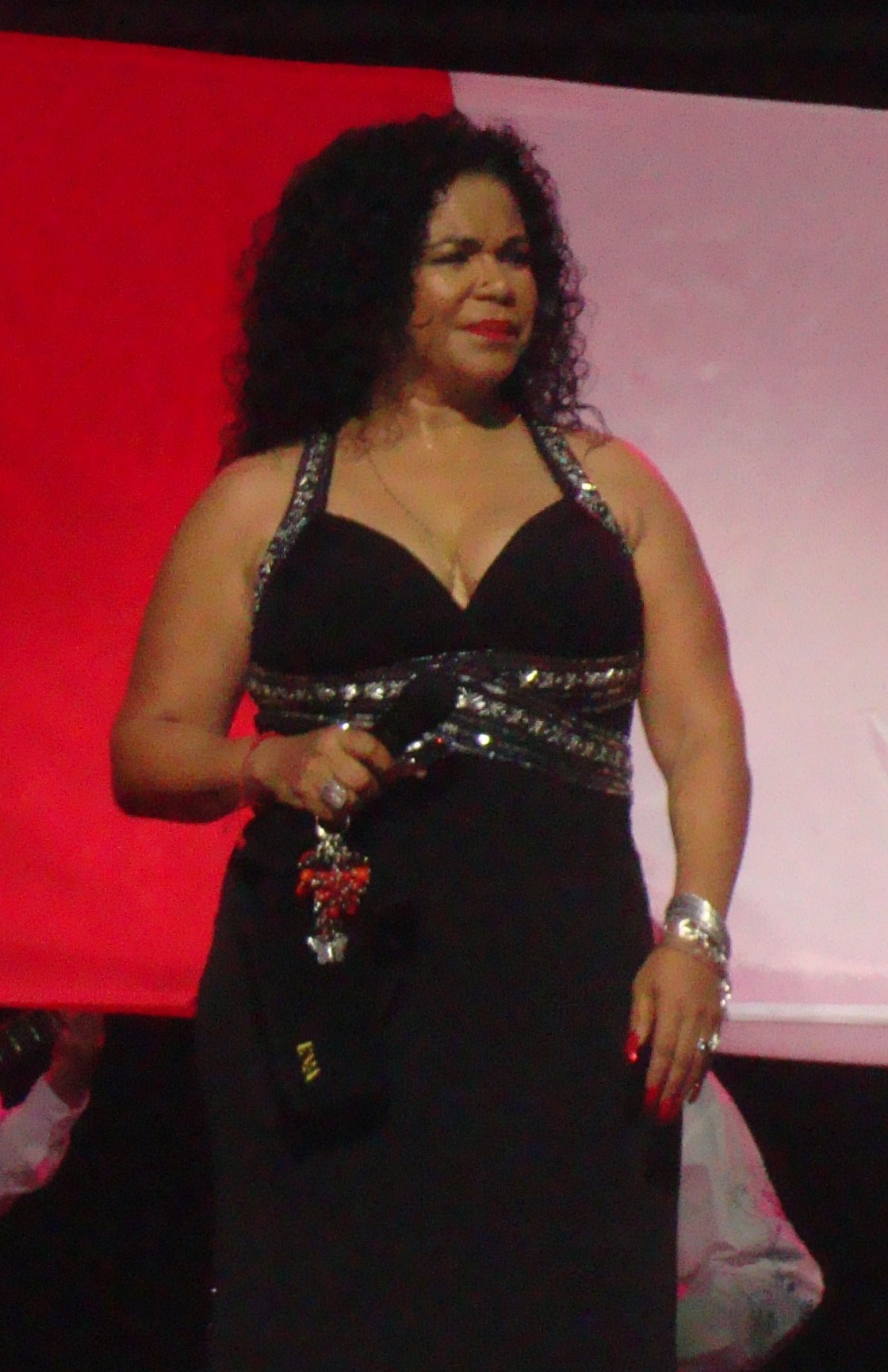
Eva Ayllón (2021–2022)

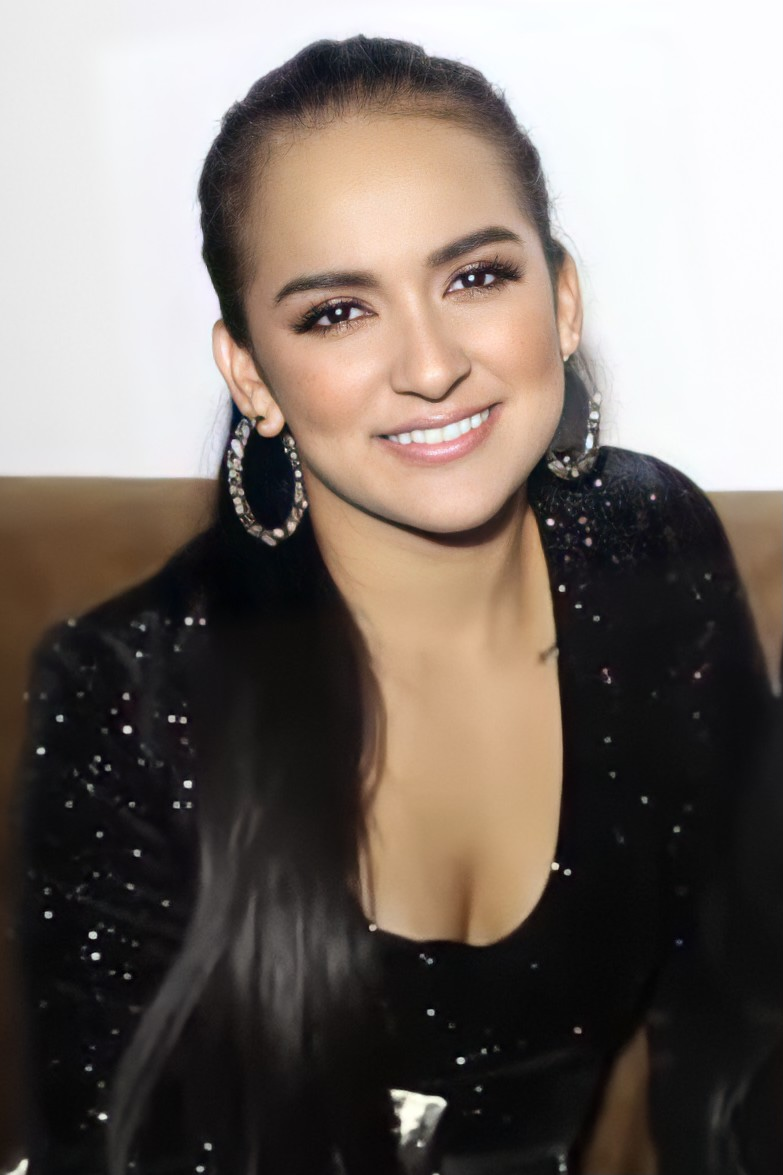
Daniela Darcourt (2021–2022)

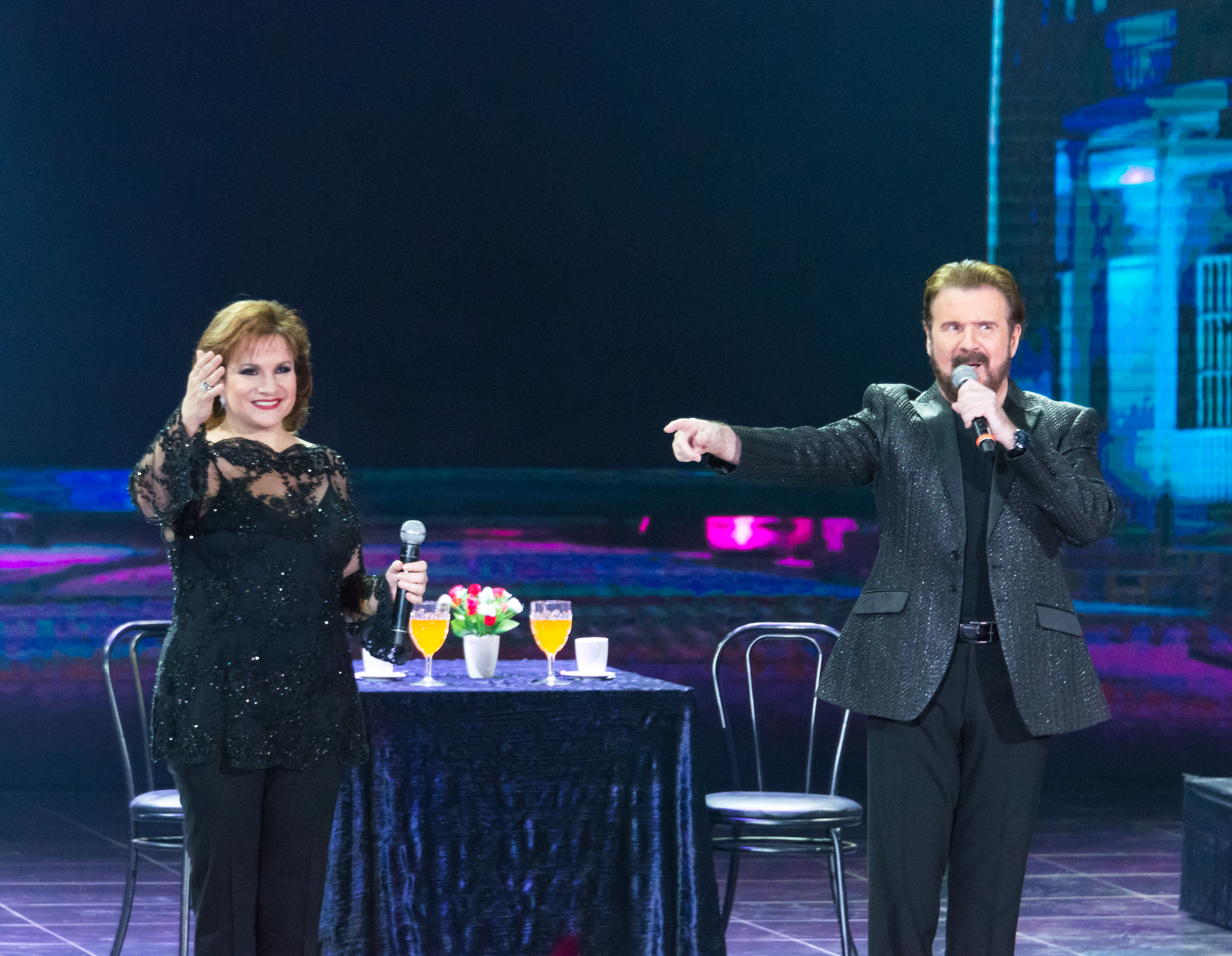
Pimpinela (duo, 2021)

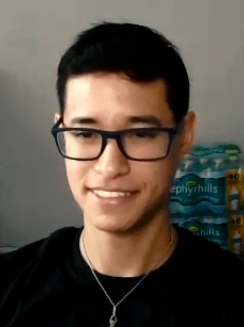
Tony Succar (2021)

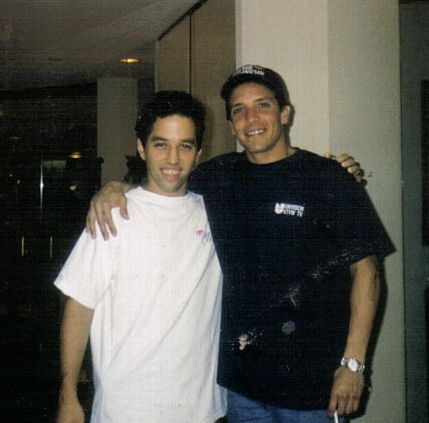
René Farrait (right, 2022)

=== Teams ===
Winner
Runner-up
Third place
Fourth place

| Season | Daniela Darcourt | Pimpinela | Eva Ayllón | Tony Succar |
|---|---|---|---|---|
| 1 | Oscar Centeno; Caridad Plaza; Dodo; Pepo Orozco; Miguel Vallejo; Denys Torres | Mito Plaza; Angela Caballero; Carlos Alonso; José Luis Meza; Rosa Muñoz; Jorge Luis Bendezú | Luis Ángel Reddel; Julio César Mancilla; Maby Curich; Fernando Campos; Virginia Cano; Roberto Pescasio | Lourdes Carhuas; Abel Alcántara; Reiser Vásquez; Los Bardos del Son; Eduardo Barrón; Lalo Quispe |
| 2 | Daniela Darcourt | René Farrait | Eva Ayllón | Raúl Romero |
| 2 | Otoniel Darío; Renán Eduardo; Yolanda Carbajal; Marco Antonio Roldá | Ana María Rossi; Luis Reynaga; Tito Bravo; Silvia Cornejo | Javier Carranza; Los Hermanos Vera; Haydee Ledesma; Abraham Páucar | Sonia Bertha; Raúl Abril; Meleke; Jeanette Romer |

== Generations edition ==
La Voz Generaciones is the Peruvian singing competition produced by Rayo in collaboration with Talpa Media, aired on Latina Televisión. Based on the original Australian version. The debut season was hosted by Cristian Rivero and Karen Schwarz. The coaches for the first season consisted of Christian Yaipén, mother-son duo Mimy & Tony Succar, and Eva Ayllón.

=== Series overview ===
Peruvian La Voz Generaciones series overview
| Season | Aired | Winner | Runner-up | Third place | Winning coach | Presenters | | Coaches (chairs' order) | | |
| Season | Aired | Winner | Runner-up | Third place | Winning coach | Presenters | | 1 | 2 | 3 |
|---|---|---|---|---|---|---|---|---|---|---|
| 1 | 2022-2023 | Dante & Paul Dávila | Familia Chacaltana | Las Rosas de Guadalupe | Christian Yaipén | Cristian Rivero | Karen Schwarz | Christian | Mimy & Tony | Eva |

=== Coaches' timeline ===
| Coach | Seasons |
| Coach | 1 |
|---|---|
| Eva Ayllón | |
| Mimy & Tony Succar | |
| Christian Yaipén | |

=== Coaches' gallery ===
Coaches gallery

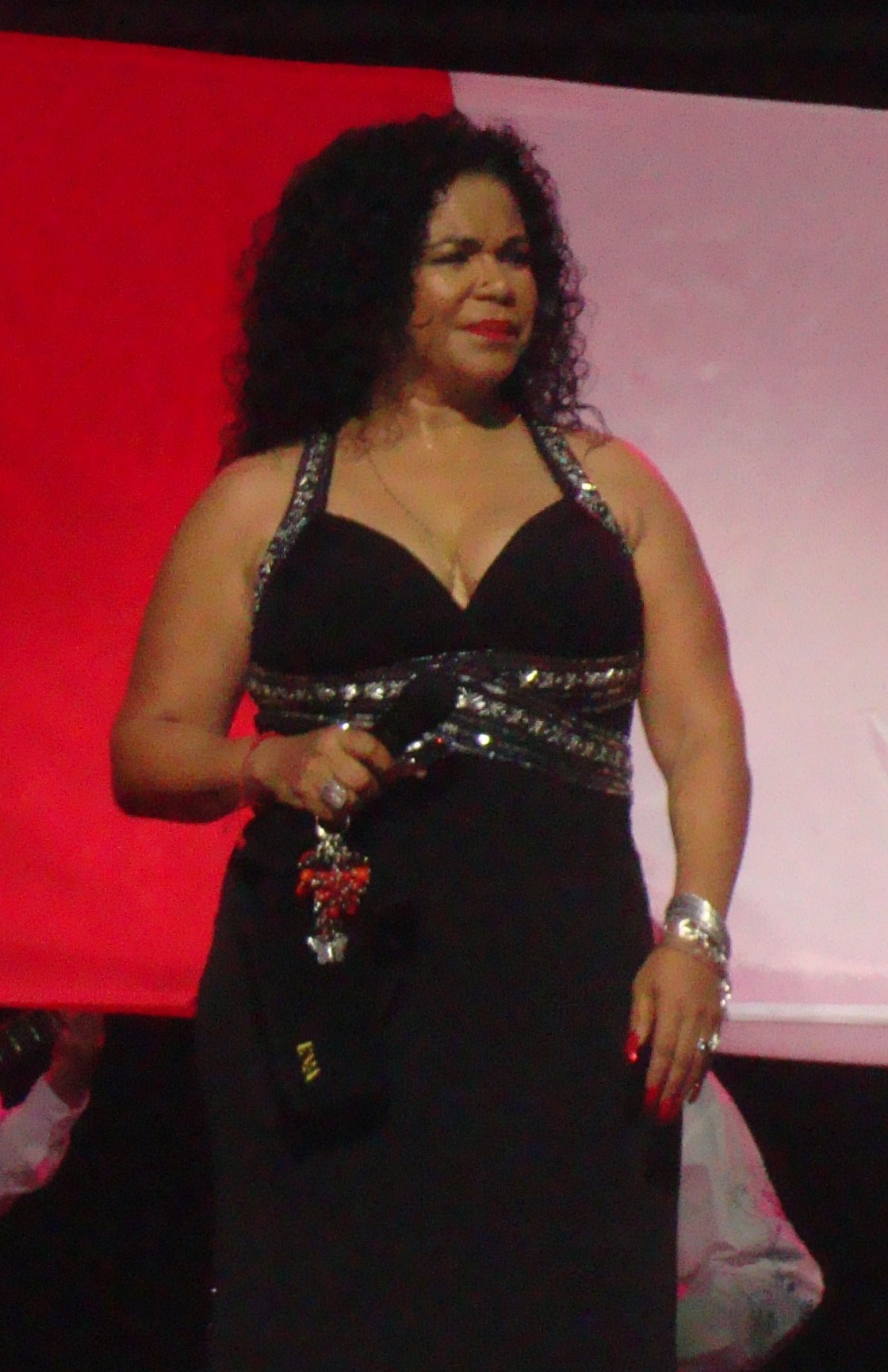
Eva Ayllón (2022–2023)

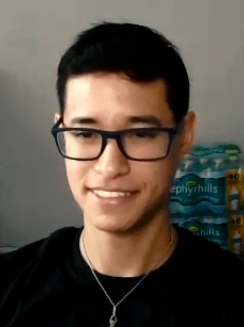
Tony Succar (2022–2023)

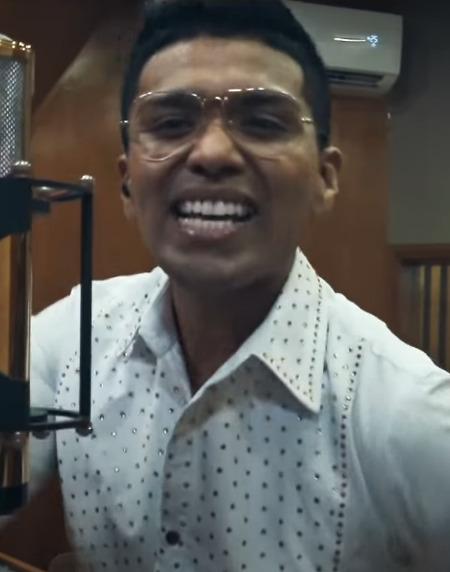
Christian Yaipén (2022–2023)

=== Teams ===
Winner
Runner-up
Third place

| Season | Christian Yaipén | Mimy & Tony | Eva Ayllón |
|---|---|---|---|
| 1 | Dante & Paul Dávila; Julio & César Mancilla; Los Bolivar; Koa Música Acapella | Las Rosas de Guadalupe; Los Leonardi; Los Palma; Eduardo & Edy | Familia Chacaltana; Los Moscoso; Las Dueñas; Coro Clave de Do |
