= Lita Pezo =

Lita Pezo Lita Melissa Pezo Cauper
- Born: 4 April 1999 (age 26); Iquitos
- Occupation: Singer
- Years active: 2014 - present

Lita Melissa Pezo Cauper (born 4 April 1999 in Iquitos), commonly known as Lita Pezo, is a Peruvian singer.

She participated in several different talent shows and Peruvian TV shows. She began her musical career at the age of 14. Her first role was in the Yo soy Kids musical TV show in 2014, in the show she imitated the role of Isabel Pantoja, for which she received the nickname "La Pantojita" .

In 2023 she made her debut in the theater; starring in the musical Oz, the Witch and the Wizard, as well as acting in the play Before You Go. She received positive acclaim for her performances. She later gained popularity as a soloist by winning the fifth season of the singing contest The Voice Peru in 2022.

She has participated in concerts of Valeria Lynch, Marisela as well as Daniela Romo in Chile and Peru respectedly. Furthermore, she collaborated in musical productions with Sergio George and José Abraham.

== Life ==
Lita Melissa Pezo Cauper was born on the 4 of April, 1999 Iquitos, Loreto, Peru. She is from a musical family, her father is a singer and was her singing coach from a young age.

She made her first artistic beginnings when she was 4 years old and in the following years she won several local song festivals. In 2012 she traveled to Lima with her father and brother, to look for opportunities in the field of music and also to be able to undertake a professional career in her future.

== Career ==
=== 2012 - 2014 ===
In 2012, she auditioned in the show, Peru has talent, in which she only performed in the first round prior to being eliminated.

In 2014, she participated in the first season of Yo Soy Kids imitating Isabel Pantoja, winning the award and a university scholarship in the final.

On June 13, 2014, Lita was honored by the Municipality of Maynas, who declared her "Favorite Daughter of the City of Iquitos", for her warrior spirit, humility, perseverance and talent that she demonstrated throughout the contest.

=== 2018 - 2022: solo singer - La voz Perú ===
In 2018, she returned to Peruvian television, leaving her role as an impersonator, to appear in the first season of The Final Four.

In 2021, after having recovered from COVID-19 and being left with sequelae in her voice, she entered the "blind auditions" in the fourth season of The Voice Peru. Although she did not make it through that stage, she received encouragement from the coaches to compete again in the following season.

At the end of 2021, she participated in Season 31 of Yo Soy, called Yo Soy Grandes Batallas Internacional, where again she imitated Isabel Pantoja with an adult tessitura.

In 2022, she auditioned for the second time to La Voz Perú in search of personal revenge. In it, she after being approved by Eva Ayllón, she moved on to the next stage of battles. Subsequently, she performed in the grand finale on August 20, where she finally became the winner of the season and obtained the possibility of recording a song under the Universal Music label. Rival coach, Noel Schajris, called the performance of the final song "Desperate". On 24 September, together with Eva Ayllón, she was a special guest at the International Song Festival of the Amazon, at the Max Augustin Stadium in Iquitos, thousands of spectators attended.

On October 14, celebrating her facet as a soloist, she gave a concert at the Plaza Norte Theatre in Lima, with the singer Eva Ayllón as a guest artist.

On October 23, Lita was a special guest in the concert of the Argentine singer Valeria Lynch at the Caupolicán Theater, in Chile. In addition, she was accompanied by various international artists such as: the singer and member of the Argentine rock band Attaque 77, Mariano Martínez, the Spanish singer Tamara and the Chilean singer and winner of The Voice Chile, Pablo Rojas.

On November 17, she took over as co-coach of the Eva Ayllón team, for the program La Voz Kids Peru in its fifth season.

On December 7, she was part of the concert entitled Vive Perú 2, accompanied by the group Los Ardiles, the singer Willy Rivera, mixing Creole music, salsa and romantic music, at the Bianca Convention Center in Barranco.

On December 24, she was a guest artist for the Christmas special on The Voice Generations, singing the Christmas carol "Noche de Paz".

=== 2023 - present ===
On March 8 with the Kalma Music label, she released her first song "Me cansé de ti", a pop ballad under the authorship of Spanish producer José Abraham.

On April 14, she was the opening gues of the concert of the singer Marisela, at the Gran Arena Monticello, Chile.

On May 27, she performed her concert called "En primera fila" at the Teatro Canout in Lima, with Amy Gutiérrez, Veruska Verdú and Mexican singer Ingrid Contreras as guest artists.

On June 7, he opened the concert of the Mexican singer Daniela Romo, at the Amphitheater of the Parque de la Exposición in Lima.

On June 23, she was the guest artist for the concert of singer-songwriter and activist Lachi together with the U.S. Embassy, in order to promote diversity and inclusion of people with disabilities, at the National University of the Peruvian Amazon, Iquitos.

On June 30, she performed her concert in the auditorium of the Colegio San Agustín in Iquitos, presenting a replica of the show "En Primera Fila" in Lima.

On July 15, she had a special guest participation in the concert of the singer Eva Ayllón, celebrating her 50 year career, at the San Marcos Stadium.

On August 6, she was part of the Radio Corazón Festival that took place at the Real Plaza Puruchuco, in front of more than 8 thousand attendees.

On September 15, she released her second unreleased song "Luchadora", as a tribute to what she described as every woman who does not let herself be defeated by adversity and who, despite the falls, continues to fight to achieve her dreams. Under the musical production of José Abraham and the Kalma Music label. In addition to having Eva Ayllón as a vocal coach.

Within three weeks of the release of "Luchadora," the music video reached one million views on YouTube. Subsequently, it was announced that by 2024 the song will participate in the international competition round at the Viña del Mar International Song Festival. At the Quinta Vergara in Viña del Mar, Chile. She reached the grand final on February 29, 2024 along with performers representing Spain and Mexico. However, she was unable to outperform her rivals due to her low rating by the jury, even though she got the highest score from the public.

In November, the song "Entrégate" was released with the Argentinian singer M. Roca and with the musical production of Sergio George. In addition to releasing the salsa version of her first unreleased song "Me cansé de ti" with Veruska Verdú, finalist of The Voice Peru.

On 2 December, she performed his concert entitled "Luchadora" at the Canout Theater in Lima, with M. Roca, Sebastián Landa and Eva Ayllón as guest artists.

== Art ==
=== Influences and musical style ===
Although her trajectory involved her own artistic processes by participating in La Voz Perú, her favorite artists who were also identified as having had an influence on her are: Isabel Pantoja, Rocío Dúrcal and Rocío Jurado.

As for her musical genre, it is said to encompass the romantic ballad. Lita noted that "I'm not closed to the possibility of varying" her musical styles.

== Personal life ==
In August 2022, through an interview for Infobae, Lita expressed having problems in her eyesight, for which she continues to receive constant treatment.

In an interview with the newspaper La República, Lita confessed that she won a university scholarship at the César Vallejo University after winning Yo soy Kids that which she did not use due to work reasons. Instead, she received a Communication Sciences degree from a private institute.

== See also ==
- José Abraham
- Isabel Pantoja
- Eva Ayllón
