= La Voz Kids (Peruvian TV series) season 4 =

La Voz Kids
- Season 4
- Hosted by: Cristian Rivero; Gianella Neyra (backstage host)
- Coaches: Eva Ayllón; Joey Montana; Daniela Darcourt; Christian Yaipén
- Winner: Gianfranco Bustios
- Winning coach: Daniela Darcourt

Release
- Original network: Latina Television
- Original release: 19 October – 18 November 2021

The fourth season of the Peruvian reality singing competition La Voz Kids premiered on 19 October 2021 and broadcasts at 20:30 from Mondays through Saturdays. It is the return of the program to the Peruvian television screen after a five-year hiatus.

Eva Ayllón and Daniela Darcourt were confirmed to be coaches, after taking part in the regular and senior editions . They are joined by Panamanian singer-songwriter Joey Montana, and Grupo 5 band leader Christian Yaipén. Cristian Rivero and Gianella Neyra are the presenters of the program.

Gianfranco Bustios from team Daniela was proclaimed as the winner, marking Daniela's first win. Also, the victory of Bustios marks the first-ever stolen talent to win the entire show.

== Teams ==
- Winner
- Runner-up
- Eliminated in the Semi-final
- Eliminated in the Quarter-Finals
- Stolen in the Battles
- Eliminated in the Battles

Coaches	Top 71 artists					
Christian Yaipén						
Christian Yaipén	Angelo Villanueva	Luna Vásquez	Paulina Villalobos	Nadja Quintanilla	Leonardo Aron	Mariel Gastelo
Christian Yaipén	Aleksha Rondón	Daryan Zanga	Mathias Zeballos	~~Vicenzo Leonardi~~	~~Gianfranco Bustios~~	~~Ezio Pereira Baldeón~~
Christian Yaipén	~~Stiven Franco~~	Reyshell Cruz	Valery Rivera	Patrick Johao	Fabian Neciosup	Luciana Cassaretto
Christian Yaipén	Paula Fernández	Axel Villanueva				
Eva Ayllón						
Eva Ayllón	César Vicente	Cielo Sánchez	Sabrina Quintana	Flafer	Luhana Sofía Ramos	Mell Alejandra
Eva Ayllón	Anely Dávila	Oscar Solis	Milagros Valbuena	~~Karen Araceli~~	~~Paulina Villalobos~~	~~Alexandra Carmen~~
Eva Ayllón	~~Leonardo Aron~~	Adriano Fabián	Angélica María	Ferni	Jean Franco Chávez	Valeria Corazao
Eva Ayllón	Lucero del Castillo	Leila Marrufo	Kiara Naidy			
Joey Montana						
Joey Montana	Fernanda Rivera	Stiven Franco	Vicenzo Leonardi	Haizam Matos	Génesis Torres	Karen Araceli
Joey Montana	Mariano Ramírez	Avril Navarro	Krishtin	~~Mariel Gastelo~~	~~Mell Alejandra~~	María Paz Muñoz
Joey Montana	Tabatha Huertas	Raffaella Baronio	Samira Jane	Moisés Vega	Dayron Aranguren	Mayrely Caballero
Joey Montana	Luciana Sánchez	Stéfano Gonzáles	Lucero Valentina			
Daniela Darcourt						
Daniela Darcourt	Gianfranco Bustios	Fiorella Caballero	Lucía Grundy	Ezio Pereira Baldeón	Alexandra Carmen	Sofi "Salsa"
Daniela Darcourt	Makarena Ardiles	Ezio Pereira	Santiago Ramos	~~Cielo Sánchez~~	~~César Vicente~~	Gadiel Bellido
Daniela Darcourt	María José López	Fátima Ferrero	Sharik Arévalo	Dayanna Nicole	Flavia Pajuelo	Mía Belén
Daniela Darcourt	Oriana Ramírez	Grazzia Farah	Jimmy Jahaziel			
Note: Italicized names are stolen artists (names struck through within former teams).

== Blind Auditions ==
Blind auditions premiered on October 19. Coaches must have eighteen contestants on its respective team, with each coach is given three blocks to use in the entire blind auditions, with one block permitted to be used during the contestant's performance.

✔	Coach pressed "QUIERO TU VOZ" button
	Artist defaulted to a coach's team
	Artist elected a coach's team
	Artist was eliminated as no coach pressed the button
✘	Coach pressed the "QUIERO TU VOZ" button, but was blocked by Christian from getting the artist
✘	Coach pressed the "QUIERO TU VOZ" button, but was blocked by Eva from getting the artist
✘	Coach pressed the "QUIERO TU VOZ" button, but was blocked by Joey from getting the artist
✘	Coach pressed the "QUIERO TU VOZ" button, but was blocked by Daniela from getting the artist

Episode	Order	Artist	Song	Coach's and artist's choices			
Episode	Order	Artist	Song	Christian	Eva	Joey	Daniela
Episode 1 (Tuesday, 19 October)	1	Sofi Salsa	"Nunca voy a olvidarte"	✔	✔	✔	✔
Episode 1 (Tuesday, 19 October)	2	Axel	"Directo al corazón"	✔	✔	✔	✔
Episode 1 (Tuesday, 19 October)	3	Mariano Ramírez	"Sweet child o'mine"	-	✔	✔	✔
Episode 1 (Tuesday, 19 October)	4	Dereck Gadea	"Esta Noche"	—	—	—	—
Episode 1 (Tuesday, 19 October)	5	Luhana Sofía Ramos	"Y se llamá Peru "	✔	✔	✔	✔
Episode 2 (Wednesday, 20 October)	1	Ezio Pereira Baldéon	"Nunca voy a olvidarte"	✔	-	-	-
Episode 2 (Wednesday, 20 October)	2	Camila Saldarriaga	"Amigo"	-	-	-	-
Episode 2 (Wednesday, 20 October)	3	Grazzia Farah	"El triste"	✔	✔	✔	✔
Episode 2 (Wednesday, 20 October)	4	Anelly Dávila	"Cuando llora mi guitarra"	-	✔	✔	✔
Episode 2 (Wednesday, 20 October)	5	Gianfranco Bustíos	"Flor de retama"	✔	✔	✔	✔
Episode 3 (Thursday, 21 October)	1	Anyely Yolith	"Titanium"	-	-	-	-
Episode 3 (Thursday, 21 October)	2	Cielo Sánchez	"De mi enamórate"	✔	✔	✔	✔
Episode 3 (Thursday, 21 October)	3	Makarena Ardiles	"Hallelujah"	✔	-	-	✔
Episode 3 (Thursday, 21 October)	4	Moisés Vega	"Como quien pierde una estrella"	-	-	✔	✘
Episode 3 (Thursday, 21 October)	5	Daniela Cristina	"No hay nadie más"	-	-	-	-
Episode 3 (Thursday, 21 October)	6	Angélica María	"Sobreviviré"	✔	✔	✔	✔
Episode 4 (Friday, 22 October)	1	Raffaella Boronio	"Bang bang"	-	✔	✔	-
Episode 4 (Friday, 22 October)	2	Leila Marrufo	"La guardia nueva"	-	✔	✔	-
Episode 4 (Friday, 22 October)	3	Lucero Carnero	"Ángel"	-	-	-	-
Episode 4 (Friday, 22 October)	4	Stefano González	"No me doy por vencido"	-	✔	✔	-
Episode 4 (Friday, 22 October)	5	Camila Seijas	"Quédate"	-	-	-	-
Episode 4 (Friday, 22 October)	6	Diego Castillo	"Hasta ayer"	✔	✔	✔	✔
Episode 5 (Saturday, 23 October)	1	Paula María Fernández	"La Bikina"	✔	-	-	-
Episode 5 (Saturday, 23 October)	2	Oscar Solís	"Soy peruano"	-	✔	✔	✔
Episode 5 (Saturday, 23 October)	3	Mariapaz Muñoz	"Espacio sideral"	-	-	✔	✔
Episode 5 (Saturday, 23 October)	4	Flavia Pajuelo	"Ángel"	-	-	✔	✔
Episode 5 (Saturday, 23 October)	5	Vincenzo Leonardi	"Sway"	✔	✔	✔	✔

== Week 2 (October 25–30) ==
Episode	Order	Artist	Song	Coach's and artist's choices			
Episode	Order	Artist	Song	Christian	Eva	Joey	Daniela
Episode 6 (Monday, 25 October)	1	María José López	"When I Was Your Man"	—	—	✔	✔-
Episode 6 (Monday, 25 October)	2	Patrick Johao	"Oye"	✔-	✔	✔	✘
Episode 6 (Monday, 25 October)	3	Christina Arabella	"Libre soy"	—	—	—	—
Episode 6 (Monday, 25 October)	4	Alexandra Becerra	"No me queda más"	—	—	—	—
Episode 6 (Monday, 25 October)	5	Reyshell Cruz	"Yo te pido amor"	✔-	—	✔	—
Episode 6 (Monday, 25 October)	6	Daffne Trigozo	"Yo perdí el corazón"	—	—	—	—
Episode 7 (Tuesday, 26 October)	1		""	—	—	—	—
Episode 7 (Tuesday, 26 October)	2		""	—	—	—	—
Episode 7 (Tuesday, 26 October)	3		""	—	—	—	—
Episode 7 (Tuesday, 26 October)	4		""	—	—	—	—
Episode 7 (Tuesday, 26 October)	5		""	—	—	—	—
Episode 7 (Tuesday, 26 October)	6		""	—	—	—	—
Episode 8 (Wednesday, 27 October)	1		""	—	—	—	—
Episode 8 (Wednesday, 27 October)	2		""	—	—	—	—
Episode 8 (Wednesday, 27 October)	3		""	—	—	—	—
Episode 8 (Wednesday, 27 October)	4		""	—	—	—	—
Episode 8 (Wednesday, 27 October)	5		""	—	—	—	—
Episode 8 (Wednesday, 27 October)	6		""	—	—	—	—
Episode 9 (Thursday, 28 October)	1		""	—	—	—	—
Episode 9 (Thursday, 28 October)	2		""	—	—	—	—
Episode 9 (Thursday, 28 October)	3		""	—	—	—	—
Episode 9 (Thursday, 28 October)	4		""	—	—	—	—
Episode 9 (Thursday, 28 October)	5		""	—	—	—	—
Episode 9 (Thursday, 28 October)	6		""	—	—	—	—
Episode 10 (Friday, 29 October)	1	Dayanna Nicole	"I Have Nothing"	—	—	✔	✔-
Episode 10 (Friday, 29 October)	2	Alba Córdova	"No me arrepiento de este amor"	—	—	—	—
Episode 10 (Friday, 29 October)	3	Dayron Aranguren	"Ahora quien"	✔	✔	✔-	✔
Episode 10 (Friday, 29 October)	4	Sharik Arévalo	"Así fue"	✔	—	✔	✔-
Episode 10 (Friday, 29 October)	5	Sigrid Munayco	"La de la mala suerte"	—	—	—	—
Episode 10 (Friday, 29 October)	6	Alexandra Carmen	"La Flor de la Canela"	✔	✔-	✔	✔
Episode 10 (Friday, 29 October)	7	Luciana Sánchez	"Alas"	—	—	✔	—
Episode 10 (Friday, 29 October)	8	Ángelo Villanueva	"Granada"	✔	✔	✔	✘

== Week 3 (November 1–6) ==
Episode	Order	Artist	Song	Coach's and artist's choices			
Episode	Order	Artist	Song	Christian	Eva	Joey	Daniela
Episode 11 (Tuesday, 2 November)	1	Fiorella Caballero	"Chola soy"	✔	✔	✔	✔-
Episode 11 (Tuesday, 2 November)	2	Haizam Matos	"Solamente tú"	—	✔	✔-	✔
Episode 11 (Tuesday, 2 November)	3	Valeria Corazao	"Soy peruano"	—	✔-	✔	—
Episode 11 (Tuesday, 2 November)	4	Avril Navarro	"Mayupi Challwachakunapas"	—	—	✔-	✔
Episode 11 (Tuesday, 2 November)	5		""	—	—	—	—
Episode 11 (Tuesday, 2 November)	6		""	—	—	—	—
Episode 12 (Wednesday, 3 November)	1	Jimmy Jahaziel	"Mi salón está de fiesta"	—	—	—	✔
Episode 12 (Wednesday, 3 November)	2	Paulina Villalobos	"Como yo nadie te ha amado"	—	✔-	—	✔
Episode 12 (Wednesday, 3 November)	3	Tabatha Huertas	"Cómo mirarte"	—	—	✔	—
Episode 12 (Wednesday, 3 November)	4	Samira Jane	"I will always love you"	✔	✔	✔-	✘
Episode 12 (Wednesday, 3 November)	5		""	—	—	—	—
Episode 12 (Wednesday, 3 November)	6		""	—	—	—	—
Episode 13 (Thursday, 4 November)	1	Lucero del Castillo	"Como yo nadie te ha amado"	—	✔-	✔	✔
Episode 13 (Thursday, 4 November)	2	Natsumi Jayme	"Tu Voz"	—	—	—	—
Episode 13 (Thursday, 4 November)	3	Nadja Quintanilla	"Ojos azules - Adiós pueblo de Ayacucho"	✔-	✔	✔	✔
Episode 13 (Thursday, 4 November)	4	Santiago Ramos	"Al final"	—	—	✔	✔-
Episode 13 (Thursday, 4 November)	5	Rafaela Diaz	""	—	—	—	—
Episode 13 (Thursday, 4 November)	6	Mariel Gastelo	"Vamos a darnos tiempo"	✔	✔	✔-	✔
Episode 14 (Friday, 5 November)	1		""	—	—	—	—
Episode 14 (Friday, 5 November)	2		""	—	—	—	—
Episode 14 (Friday, 5 November)	3		""	—	—	—	—
Episode 14 (Friday, 5 November)	4		""	—	—	—	—
Episode 14 (Friday, 5 November)	5		""	—	—	—	—
Episode 14 (Friday, 5 November)	6		""	—	—	—	—

=== The Battles ===
Battle rounds started on November 6, same week as the blind audition was aired. Coaches are helped by their respective advisers. Susan Ochoa for Team Eva, Amy Guttiérez for Team Christian, Nicole Favre for team Joey, and Johnny Lau for Team Daniela

The power to "Steal" is implemented this season, making it the seventh kids version to adopt "Steal" from regular version (the first one was the fifth season of Vietnamese kids version). Contrary to other versions where the steal is made off-stage, it is done while the contestants are on-stage. Coaches was given three "Steals" to save losing artist from another team.

Artist won the Battle and advanced to the Quarter-finals
Artist lost the Battle but was stolen by another coach and advanced to the Quarter-finals
Artist lost the Battle and was eliminated

Episode	Coach	Order	Winner	Song	Losers	'Steal' result			
Episode	Coach	Order	Winner	Song	Losers	Christian	Eva	Joey	Daniela
Episode 15 (November 6, 2021)	Daniela	1	Lucía Grundy	"Como yo te amo"	Cielo Sánchez	—	✔	—	—N/a
Episode 15 (November 6, 2021)	Daniela	1	Lucía Grundy	"Como yo te amo"	Jimmy Jahaziel	—	—	—	—N/a
Episode 15 (November 6, 2021)	Eva	2	Anely Dávila	"Enamorada de estar aquí"	Leila Marrufo	—	—N/a	—	—
Episode 15 (November 6, 2021)	Eva	2	Anely Dávila	"Enamorada de estar aquí"	Kiara Naidy	—	—N/a	—	—
Episode 15 (November 6, 2021)	Christian	3	Angelo Villanueva	"Si no te hubieras ido"	Axel Villanueva	—N/a	—	—	—
Episode 15 (November 6, 2021)	Christian	3	Angelo Villanueva	"Si no te hubieras ido"	Stiven Franco	—N/a	—	✔	—
Episode 15 (November 6, 2021)	Christian	4	Luna Vásquez	"Amor prohibido"	Luciana Cassaretto	—N/a	—	—	—
Episode 15 (November 6, 2021)	Christian	4	Luna Vásquez	"Amor prohibido"	Paula Fernández	—N/a	—	—	—
Episode 15 (November 6, 2021)	Eva	5	Sabrina Quintana	"Cielo"	Valeria Corazao	—	—N/a	—	—
Episode 15 (November 6, 2021)	Eva	5	Sabrina Quintana	"Cielo"	Lucero del Castillo	—	—N/a	—	—
Episode 15 (November 6, 2021)	Joey	6	Mariano Ramírez	"I Feel Good"	Raffaella Baronio	—	—	—N/a	—
Episode 15 (November 6, 2021)	Joey	6	Mariano Ramírez	"I Feel Good"	Samira Jane	—	—	—N/a	—

== Week 4 (November 8–13) ==
Episode	Coach	Order	Winner	Song	Losers	'Steal' result			
Episode	Coach	Order	Winner	Song	Losers	Christian	Eva	Joey	Daniela
Episode 16 (November 8, 2021)	Daniela	1	Santiago Ramos	"Me vas a extrañar"	Oriana Ramírez	—	—	—	—N/a
Episode 16 (November 8, 2021)	Daniela	1	Santiago Ramos	"Me vas a extrañar"	Grazzia Farah	—	—	—	—N/a
Episode 16 (November 8, 2021)	Joey	2	Haizam Matos	"Mi Persona Favorita"	Stéfano Gonzáles	—	—	—N/a	—
Episode 16 (November 8, 2021)	Joey	2	Haizam Matos	"Mi Persona Favorita"	Lucero Valentina	—	—	—N/a	—
Episode 16 (November 8, 2021)	Eva	3	Luhana Sofía Ramos	"Estrellita del sur"	Jean Franco Chávez	—	—N/a	—	—
Episode 16 (November 8, 2021)	Eva	3	Luhana Sofía Ramos	"Estrellita del sur"	Leonardo Aron	✔	—N/a	—	—
Episode 16 (November 8, 2021)	Joey	4	Avril Navarro	"Tren del cielo"	Luciana Sánchez	—	—	—N/a	—
Episode 16 (November 8, 2021)	Joey	4	Avril Navarro	"Tren del cielo"	Mayrely Caballero	—	—	—N/a	—
Episode 16 (November 8, 2021)	Christian	5	Mathías Zevallos	"Te vas"	Ezio Pereira Baldeón	—N/a	—	✔	✔
Episode 16 (November 8, 2021)	Daniela	6	Fiorella Caballero	"Quién eres tú "	Mía Belén	—	—	—	—N/a
Episode 16 (November 8, 2021)	Daniela	6	Fiorella Caballero	"Quién eres tú "	Flavia Pajuelo	—	—	—	—N/a
Episode 17 (November 9, 2021)	Eva	1	Milagros Valbuena	"Odio amarte"	Alexandra Carmen	—	—N/a	—	✔
Episode 17 (November 9, 2021)	Eva	1	Milagros Valbuena	"Odio amarte"	Ferni	—	—N/a	—	—
Episode 17 (November 9, 2021)	Christian	2	Daryan Zanga	"Será que no me amas"	Patrick Johao	—N/a	—	—	—
Episode 17 (November 9, 2021)	Christian	2	Daryan Zanga	"Será que no me amas"	Fabian Neciosup	—N/a	—	—	—
Episode 17 (November 9, 2021)	Daniela	3	Sofi "Salsa"	"En peligro de extinción"	Sharik Arévalo	—	—	—	—N/a
Episode 17 (November 9, 2021)	Daniela	3	Sofi "Salsa"	"En peligro de extinción"	Dayanna Nicole	—	—	—	—N/a
Episode 17 (November 9, 2021)	Joey	4	Fernanda Rivera	"Me enamoré de ti y qué"	Mariel Gastelo	✔	—	—N/a	—
Episode 17 (November 9, 2021)	Joey	4	Fernanda Rivera	"Me enamoré de ti y qué"	Mell Alejandra	—	✔	—N/a	—
Episode 17 (November 9, 2021)	Christian	5	Nadja Quintanilla	"Lejos de ti"	Valery Rivera	—N/a	—	—	—
Episode 17 (November 9, 2021)	Christian	5	Nadja Quintanilla	"Lejos de ti"	Gianfranco Bustios	—N/a	✔	✔	✔
Episode 17 (November 9, 2021)	Daniela	6	Makarena Ardiles	"The Way You Make Me Feel"	María José López	—	—	—	—N/a
Episode 17 (November 9, 2021)	Daniela	6	Makarena Ardiles	"The Way You Make Me Feel"	Fátima Ferrero	—	—	—	—N/a
Episode 18 (November 10, 2021)	Joey	1	Kristhin	"Recuérdame"	Moisés Vega	—	—	—N/a	—
Episode 18 (November 10, 2021)	Joey	1	Kristhin	"Recuérdame"	Dayron Aranguren	—	—	—N/a	—
Episode 18 (November 10, 2021)	Daniela	2	Giorgio Tafur	"Después de mí"	César Vicente	—	✔	—	—N/a
Episode 18 (November 10, 2021)	Daniela	2	Giorgio Tafur	"Después de mí"	Gadiel Bellido	—	—	—	—N/a
Episode 18 (November 10, 2021)	Eva	3	Oscar Solís	"Nada de esto fue un error"	Adriano Fabián	—	—N/a	—	—
Episode 18 (November 10, 2021)	Eva	3	Oscar Solís	"Nada de esto fue un error"	Angélica María	—	—N/a	—	—
Episode 18 (November 10, 2021)	Joey	4	Génesis Torres	"Hasta la raíz "	María Paz Muñoz	—	—	—N/a	—
Episode 18 (November 10, 2021)	Joey	4	Génesis Torres	"Hasta la raíz "	Tabatha Huertas	—	—	—N/a	—
Episode 18 (November 10, 2021)	Christian	5	Aleshka Rondón	"Fuiste tú"	Vincenzo Leonardi	—N/a	✔	✔	✔
Episode 18 (November 10, 2021)	Christian	5	Aleshka Rondón	"Fuiste tú"	Reyshell Cruz	—N/a	—	—	—
Episode 18 (November 10, 2021)	Eva	6	Flafer	"Tu falta de querer"	Karen Araceli	—	—N/a	✔	—
Episode 18 (November 10, 2021)	Eva	6	Flafer	"Tu falta de querer"	Paulina Villalobos	✔	—N/a	—	—

=== Quarter-Finals / Sing-Offs ===
Quarter-finals begin on November 12, same week as the Battle rounds was aired. In the quarter-finals, the remaining 36 kid contestants sang the song of their choice, respectively. Artist who had been saved by coach, will go forward to the Semi-Finals.

Artist was Saved by coach, and advanced to the Semi-Finals
Artist was eliminated

Episode	Coach	Order	Artist	Song	Result
Episode 20 (November 12, 2021)	Daniela	1	Santiago Ramos	"Y tú te vas"	Eliminated
Episode 20 (November 12, 2021)	Daniela	2	Lucía Grundy	"Cielo rojo"	Advanced
Episode 20 (November 12, 2021)	Daniela	3	Ezio Pereira	"La mejor de todas"	Eliminated
Episode 20 (November 12, 2021)	Christian	4	Mathias Zeballos	"Nunca voy a olvidarte"	Eliminated
Episode 20 (November 12, 2021)	Christian	5	Daryan Zanga	"Si nos dejan"	Eliminated
Episode 20 (November 12, 2021)	Christian	6	Angelo Villanueva	"Amor de mis amores"	Advanced
Episode 20 (November 12, 2021)	Joey	7	Krishtin	"Wrecking Ball"	Eliminated
Episode 20 (November 12, 2021)	Joey	8	Fernanda Rivera	"Aguanilé / Químbara"	Advanced
Episode 20 (November 12, 2021)	Joey	9	Avril Navarro	"Te propongo"	Eliminated
Episode 20 (November 12, 2021)	Eva	10	Milagros Valbuena	"Sabor a mí"	Eliminated
Episode 20 (November 12, 2021)	Eva	11	Sabrina Quintana	"Side to side"	Advanced
Episode 20 (November 12, 2021)	Eva	12	Oscar Solís	"Lima de antaño"	Eliminated
Episode 21 (November 13, 2021)	Eva	1	Mell Alejandra	"Ya no vives en mí"	Eliminated
Episode 21 (November 13, 2021)	Eva	2	Flafer	"Nuestro secreto"	Eliminated
Episode 21 (November 13, 2021)	Eva	3	César Vicente	"Beggin"	Advanced
Episode 21 (November 13, 2021)	Joey	4	Génesis Torres	"No me queda más"	Eliminated
Episode 21 (November 13, 2021)	Joey	5	Stiven Franco	"El Rey"	Advanced
Episode 21 (November 13, 2021)	Joey	6	Karen Araceli	"Tormento"	Eliminated
Episode 21 (November 13, 2021)	Daniela	7	Alexandra Carmen	"Me va extrañar"	Eliminated
Episode 21 (November 13, 2021)	Daniela	8	Gianfranco Bustíos	"Mamacha de Las Mercedes"	Advanced
Episode 21 (November 13, 2021)	Daniela	9	Makarena Ardiles	"Hopelessly Devoted To You"	Eliminated
Episode 21 (November 13, 2021)	Eva	10	Anely Dávila	"Quererte a ti"	Eliminated
Episode 21 (November 13, 2021)	Eva	11	Luhana Ramos	"Nunca podrán"	Eliminated
Episode 21 (November 13, 2021)	Eva	12	Cielo Sánchez	"No sé"	Advanced
Episode 21 (November 13, 2021)	Joey	13	Vincenzo Leonardi	"Back to Black"	Advanced
Episode 21 (November 13, 2021)	Joey	14	Haizam Matos	"Y cómo es él"	Eliminated
Episode 21 (November 13, 2021)	Joey	15	Mariano Ramírez	"Welcome to the Jungle"	Eliminated
Episode 21 (November 13, 2021)	Christian	16	Nadja Quintanilla	"Cambio mi corazón"	Eliminated
Episode 21 (November 13, 2021)	Christian	17	Leonardo Aron	"Oh mamá"	Eliminated
Episode 21 (November 13, 2021)	Christian	18	Luna Vásquez	"My Heart Will Go On"	Advanced
Episode 21 (November 13, 2021)	Daniela	19	Fiorella Caballero	"Mal paso"	Advanced
Episode 21 (November 13, 2021)	Daniela	20	Giorgio Tafur	"Si tú no estás"	Eliminated
Episode 21 (November 13, 2021)	Daniela	21	Sofia "Salsa"	"Porque essta hembra no llora"	Eliminated
Episode 21 (November 13, 2021)	Christian	22	Paulina Villalobos	"Anyone"	Advanced
Episode 21 (November 13, 2021)	Christian	23	Aleshka Rondón	"Contigo a la distancia"	Eliminated
Episode 21 (November 13, 2021)	Christian	24	Mariela Gastela	"El hombre que amo"	Eliminated

== Final Week ==
=== Live Semi-Finals ===
Semi-Finals began at November 15. also, aired in a two-part episode. Two teams will perform in an episode. Although the Semi-Finals was broadcast Live, it doesn't feature interactive viewer voting component, and therefore no subsequent results shows. The top four artists (one per team) coming from the selection of the coaches. will advance to the Finals.

Color key:

Artist was chosen by his/her coach to move on to the Grand Finals
Artist was eliminated

Episode	Coach	Order	Artist	Song	Result
Episode 22 (November 15, 2021)	Eva	1	César Vicente	"Feeling Good"	Advanced
Episode 22 (November 15, 2021)	Eva	2	Cielo Sánchez	"Como la Flor"	Eliminated
Episode 22 (November 15, 2021)	Eva	3	Sabrina Quintana	"Something's Got a Hold On Me"	Eliminated
Episode 22 (November 15, 2021)	Joey	4	Stiven Franco	"Mi salón está de fiesta"	Eliminated
Episode 22 (November 15, 2021)	Joey	5	Fernanda Rivera	"Si tú eres mi hombre"	Advanced
Episode 22 (November 15, 2021)	Joey	6	Vincenzo Leonardi	"Hot Stuff"	Eliminated
Episode 23 (November 16, 2021)	Christian	7	Luna Vásquez	"La Llorona"	Eliminated
Episode 23 (November 16, 2021)	Christian	8	Angelo Villanueva	"El Triste"	Advanced
Episode 23 (November 16, 2021)	Christian	9	Paulina Villalobos	"Sin Ti"	Eliminated
Episode 23 (November 16, 2021)	Daniela	10	Gianfranco Bustíos	"Busco A Huamanga"	Advanced
Episode 23 (November 16, 2021)	Daniela	11	Fiorella Caballero	"Por Siempre Tú"	Eliminated
Episode 23 (November 16, 2021)	Daniela	12	Lucía Grundy	"Lejos de los Ojos"	Eliminated

=== Live Grand Finals ===
Grand Finals take place on November 17. As it is broadcasts Live, it features interactive viewer voting component. Meaning, the determination of the winner will be from the vote of the public via televoting. Artist who gathered the most vote, will be proclaimed as the winner.

==== Color Key ====
Artist was proclaimed as the winner
Artist ended as the runner-up

Coach	Artist	Round 1		Round 2		Result
Coach	Artist	Order	Duet With Coach	Order	Solo Song	Result
Christian Yaipen	Angelo Villanueva	1	"Morir de amor"	1	"Te Quiero, Te Quiero"	Runner-up
Eva Ayllon	César Vicente	2	"Vivir así es morir de amor"	2	"My Way"	Runner-up
Joey Montana	Fernanda Rivera	3	"La melodía"	3	"De Mi Enamorarté"	Runner-up
Daniela Darcourt	Gianfranco Bustíos	4	"Ojos azules/Adiós pueblo de Ayacucho"	4	"Poluellos"	Winner
