= José Abraham =

Spanish writer, composer and music producer

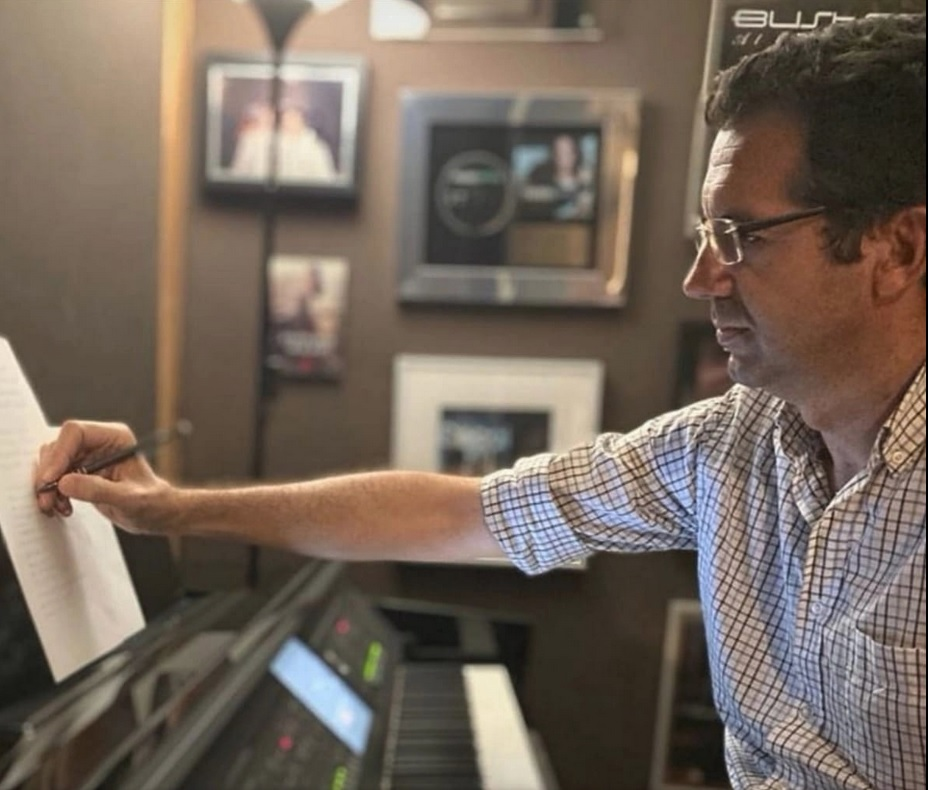
- José Abraham, working in his studio in 2023
- Born: 18 March 1974 (age 52); Seville, Spain
- Occupations: Author, music producer, composer
- Writing career
- Genres: Pop, ballade

José Abraham (born 18 March 1974 in Seville) is a Spanish writer, composer and music producer. His songs have been published in more than 40 countries. He has collaborated with multiple producers, musicians and orchestras around the world. His works have been performed at Madison Square Garden in New York, the Hollywood Palladium in Los Angeles and the Royal Albert Hall in London.

== Biography ==
José Abraham has a degree in law from the University of Seville, is an expert lawyer in Intellectual Law from the Inesem Business School, founder of the School of Artists of Andalusia, and CEO of the record label "Kalma Music" and his own music publishing house "José Abraham Publishing".

In 2014, he was recognized by the International Songwriting Competition (United States) as the Best Latin Songwriter, also receiving an honorable mention from the organization. In 2021, he placed among the Top 3 finalists at the New Wave Musical Festival held in Russia, one of the leading music festivals in Eastern Europe.

Throughout his career, he has written, produced, or collaborated on studio albums with artists such as Roberto Carlos, Cristian Castro, Jennifer Lopez, Alejandro Sanz, David Bisbal, Marc Anthony, David Bustamante, Tamara, Pastora Soler, Shaila Dúrcal, Chenoa, Amaury Gutiérrez, Rosa, Manolo Escobar, Yahir, Yuridia, Antonio Cortés, Chilean singers Luis Jara and Américo, and the Mexican regional group El Trono de México.

His most notable works include songs such as “El alma en pie,” “Cobarde,” “Esclavo de sus besos,” “Dame tu amor,” “La mala costumbre,” “Mi consentida,” and “Dos corazones rotos.” His discography includes more than thirty-five platinum records, twelve gold records, and six platinum-certified DVDs, with his work amassing tens of millions of online views.

Several of his compositions have been shortlisted to represent Spain in the Eurovision Song Contest in 2002, 2003, 2004, 2007, 2012, and 2017.

In 2024, he was the finalist composer selected to win the Viña del Mar Festival in Chile, the most important Spanish-language music contest in the world, organized and broadcast by The Walt Disney Company, with the participation of Andrea Bocelli and Alejandro Sanz as guest artists.

José Abraham holds a Law degree from the University os Seville. He is a lawyer specializing in intellectual property Law from INESEM Business School. He is the founder of Escuela de Artistas de Andalucía, an CEO of the record label Kalma Music as well as his own music publishing company, José Abraham Publishing.
