= Live at Carnegie Hall (Natalia Lafourcade album) =

Natalia Lafourcade: Live at Carnegie Hall

Live album by Natalia Lafourcade
- Released: 6 December 2024
- Recorded: 27 October 2022
- Venue: Carnegie Hall (New York City)
- Genres: Alternative pop; bolero; folk; Latin alternative; jazz; bossa nova
- Length: 1:45:11
- Label: Sony Mexico
- Producers: Cheche Alara; Natalia Lafourcade

Natalia Lafourcade chronology
De Todas las Flores (2022)	Natalia Lafourcade: Live at Carnegie Hall (2024)	Cancionera (2025)

Singles from Cancionera
- 1. "El Lugar Correcto" Released: 20 November 2024

Natalia Lafourcade: Live at Carnegie Hall is the first live album by Mexican singer-songwriter Natalia Lafourcade. It was released on 6 December 2024 on Sony Music Mexico.

The album mainly contains songs from the albums Hasta la Raíz (2015) and De Todas las Flores (2022), although it also contains tracks from Musas, Vol. 1 (2017), Musas, Vol. 2 (2018), Un Canto por México, Vol. 1 (2020) and Un Canto por México, Vol. 2 (2021).

This live album features David Byrne, Jorge Drexler, and Omara Portuondo.

== Background and launch ==
To present and promote De Todas las Flores, Lafourcade gave her first concert at Carnegie Hall in Manhattan, New York on 27 October 2022, just one day before the album's official release.

The concert, recorded at the Sternen Auditorium, paved the way for the album's release two years later. According to Lafourcade, this work "represents a moment that marked her musical journey and is also a bridge to a new stage." Prior to this release, Lafourcade released "El Lugar Correcto" as a single, accompanied by a music video.

== Track listing ==
Natalia Lafourcade: Live at Carnegie Hall track listing
No.	Title	Writer(s)	Length
1.	"Intro"	Natalia Lafourcade	2:10
2.	"De Todas las Flores"	Lafourcade	5:19
3.	"Pasan Los Días"	Lafourcade	7:04
4.	"El Lugar Correcto"	Lafourcade	3:30
5.	"Pajarito Colibrí"	Lafourcade	6:35
6.	"María la Curandera"	Lafourcade	8:13
7.	"Caminar Bonito"	Lafourcade	3:56
8.	"Mi Manera de Querer"	Lafourcade	4:08
9.	"Canta la Arena"	Lafourcade, David Aguilar	4:20
10.	"Muerte – Intro" (featuring David Byrne)	Lafourcade, Aguilar	1:36
11.	"Muerte" (featuring David Byrne)	Lafourcade, Aguilar	7:32
12.	"Cien Años"	Rubén Fuentes, Alberto Cervantes	4:15
13.	"Lo Que Construimos"	Lafourcade	4:21
14.	"Ya No Vivo Por Vivir" (featuring Jorge Drexler)	Alberto Aguilera Valadez	5:46
15.	"Alma Mía"	María Grever	3:13
16.	"Tú Me Acostumbraste" (featuring Omara Portuondo)	Frank Domínguez	4:38
17.	"Soledad y El Mar" (featuring Omara Portuondo)	Lafourcade, Aguilar	4:13
18.	"Hasta la Raíz"	Lafourcade, Leonel García	4:34
19.	"Mi Tierra Veracruzana"	Lafourcade	13:19
20.	"Nunca Es Suficiente"	Lafourcade, Daniela Azpiazu	6:29
Total length:			1:45:11
