= Cancionera (album) =

Studio album by Natalia Lafourcade
- Released: 24 April 2025
- Genre: Bolero; Ranchera; Son jarocho; Huapango; Cumbia; Tango; Pregón; Rumba; Jazz; Tropical music; Salsa; Latin American folk; Vocal jazz; Música tradicional mexicana; Música veracruzana
- Length: 76:00
- Language: Spanish
- Label: Sony Mexico
- Producer: Adán Jodorowsky; Natalia Lafourcade

Natalia Lafourcade chronology
Live at Carnegie Hall (2024)	Cancionera (2025)

Singles from Cancionera
- 1. "Cancionera" Released: 28 February 2025; 2. "Como Quisiera Quererte" Released: 27 March 2025

Cancionera (transl. Songstress) is the eleventh studio album by Mexican singer-songwriter Natalia Lafourcade. It was released on 24 April 2025 on Sony Music Mexico. For this work, Lafourcade presents her artistic alter ego: "La Cancionera" (The Songstress).

== Background and launch ==
Cancionera was recorded in late 2024 at Sony Music studios. The recording was done on analog tape over a period of three weeks, with 18 musicians playing live alongside Lafourcade in the studio. This approach sought to capture the spontaneity and authenticity of each performance, avoiding digital editing and highlighting a handcrafted and collective process.

Cancionera was produced by Lafourcade and Adán Jodorowsky, who had previously collaborated on Lafourcade's earlier album, De Todas las Flores. Additionally, the Soundwalk Collective contributed a sound design that integrates natural sounds into the album's musical landscape.

Cancionera was officially released on 24 April 2025 on CD, vinyl, digital download and streaming.

== Title ==
The album title, Cancionera, not only names the work, but also represents a profound and multifaceted concept that encapsulates her artistic and personal evolution. "La Cancionera" is Lafourcade's alter ego, a figure who embodies the essence of music as a bridge between the intimate and the universal. She is a wandering troubadour, a voice that roams the night with an air of mystery, representing duality: light and shadow, tradition and transgression, sweetness and rebellion.

The concept of Cancionera emerged during a period of introspection for Lafourcade, coinciding with her transition into her forties. The artist expressed that this step led her to encounter the "Cancionera," a figure that allowed her to reconnect with her essence and explore her creativity from a renewed perspective.

== Critical reception ==
Cancionera was met with critical acclaim for its introspective lyrics, symbolism to Mexican folk culture, and Lafourade's collaboration with several notable Latin American artists during the album's production.

=== Accolades ===
List of awards and nominations received by Cancionera
Year	Award	Category	Result	Ref.
2025	Latin Grammy Awards	Album of the Year	Nominated	
2025	Latin Grammy Awards	Best Singer-Songwriter Album	Won	
2025	Latin Grammy Awards	Record of the Year	Nominated	
2025	WME Awards	Latin American Song	Nominated	
2025	2026	Grammy Awards	Best Latin Pop Album	Won

== Track listing ==
All tracks are written by Natalia Lafourcade, exceptions listed where noted.

Cancionera track listing
No.	Title	Length
1.	"Apertura Cancionera"	5:19
2.	"Cancionera"	5:36
3.	"Cocos en la Playa"	4:25
4.	"Como Quisiera Quererte (featuring El David Aguilar)" (Lafourcade, Aguilar)	4:18
5.	"Amor Clandestino (featuring Israel Fernández)" (Lafourcade, Fernández)	3:55
6.	"Mascaritas de Cristal"	6:25
7.	"El Coconito (featuring El David Aguilar)" (Barcelata Castro)	3:52
8.	"El Palomo y La Negra" (Lafourcade, Aguilar)	7:00
9.	"Cariñito de Acapulco"	6:36
10.	"La Bruja (song version)" (Lafourcade, Citlali Aguilar)	6:03
11.	"Luna Creciente (featuring Hermanos Gutiérrez)" (Lafourcade, Los Hermanos Gutiérrez)	6:48
12.	"Lágrimas Cancioneras"	5:14
13.	"Amor Clandestino (featuring Israel Fernández and Diego del Morao, acoustic version)" (Natalia Lafourcade, Israel Fernández, Diego del Morao)	4:50
14.	"Cancionera (acoustic version)"	5:30
Total length:		76:00

== Charts ==
Chart performance for Cancionera
Chart (2025)	Peak position
Spanish Albums (Promusicae)	91
