= Un Canto por México, Vol. 2 =

Studio album by Natalia Lafourcade
- Released: May 28, 2021
- Genre: Folk; bolero; son jarocho
- Length: 57:31
- Language: Spanish
- Label: Sony
- Producer: Kiko Campos

Natalia Lafourcade chronology
Un Canto por México, Vol. 1 (2020)	Un Canto por México, Vol. 2 (2021)	De Todas las Flores (2022)

Singles from Un Canto por México, Vol. 2
- 1. "Cien años" Released: April 5, 2021; 2. "Tú sí sabes quererme" Released: May 13, 2021; 3. "Nada es verdad (feat. Los Cojolites)" Released: May 27, 2021

Un Canto por México, Vol. 2 (English: "A Song for México, Volume 2"), is the ninth studio album by Mexican singer-songwriter Natalia Lafourcade, based on a concert made on November 4, 2019 called Un canto por México para la reconstrucción del Centro de Documentación del Son Jarocho, it is the second part of the project following the 2020 album Un Canto por México, Vol. 1. It was released on May 28, 2021.

At the 22nd Annual Latin Grammy Awards, the album received nominations for Album of the Year and Best Engineered Album, while at the 64th Annual Grammy Awards it was nominated for Best Regional Mexican Music Album (including Tejano).

== Background ==
Like the previous volume, Un Canto para México, Vol. 2 is part of a project destined to the reconstruction of the Centro de Documentación del Son Jarocho at Jáltipan de Morelos, a cultural building that was damaged after the 2017 Puebla earthquake on 19 September 2017. The album follows the format of her previous effort, Musas, which was also divided in two volumes and featured a remarkable set of collaborations with Latin artists.

The album contains songs by Lafourcade, like "Para que sufrir" from Hasta la Raíz, traditional songs including a cover of "La Llorona", a song that also appeared in Musas, Vol. 2, this time alongside Mexican singers Ely Guerra and Silvana Estrada, and songs from other Latin American artists like "Cien Años" from Mexican singer Pedro Infante, "La trenza-Amor completo" from Chilean singer Mon Laferte and "Recuérdame", a song written by Kristen Anderson-Lopez and Robert Lopez for the 2017 animated movie Coco.

== Reception ==
Un Canto por México, Vol. 2 was ranked at number five in the list for "The 35 Best Spanish-Language and Bilingual Albums of 2021" by the American magazine Rolling Stone.

== Singles ==
The first single was a cover of Pedro Infante's "Cien Años", released on April 5, 2021 featuring Infante. The second single was a version of "Tú si sabes quererme" with Mexican singer Mare Advertencia Lirika and Panamanian Rubén Blades released on May 13, 2021. The third single, "Nada es verdad" with Los Cojolites was released on May 27, 2021.

== Track listing ==
All tracks are produced by Kiko Campos.

No.	Title	Writer(s)	Length
1.	"La Llorona"	Traditional	07:29
2.	"Cien Años (featuring Pepe Aguilar)"	Rubén Fuentes, Alberto Raúl Cervantes González	03:42
3.	"Alma Mía / Tú Me Acostumbraste / Soledad y El Mar"	María Grever, Frank Domínguez, Natalia Lafourcade, David Aguilar	08:44
4.	"Luz de Luna (featuring Aida Cuevas)"	Álvaro Carrillo Alarcón	03:15
5.	"La Trenza / Amor Completo (featuring Mon Laferte)"	Mon Laferte	07:54
6.	"Nada Es Verdad (featuring Los Cojolites)"	Noé González	03:47
7.	"Recuérdame (featuring Carlos Rivera)"	Robert Lopez, Kristen Anderson-Lopez	04:24
8.	"La Llorona (featuring Silvana Estrada and Ely Guerra)"	Traditional	06:10
9.	"Soy lo Prohibido (featuring Caetano Veloso)"	Francisco Dino López Ramos, Roberto Cantoral	03:42
10.	"Tú Sí Sabes Quererme (featuring Mare Advertencia Lirika and Rubén Blades)"	Natalia Lafourcade	04:28
11.	"Para Qué Sufrir (featuring Jorge Drexler)"	Natalia Lafourcade, Juan Manuel Torreblanca	03:56
Total length:			57:31
