= De Todas las Flores =

Studio album by Natalia Lafourcade
- Released: 28 October 2022
- Genre: Latin jazz; folk; bolero; cumbia; bossa nova; samba; son jarocho
- Length: 66:36
- Language: Spanish
- Label: Sony Mexico
- Producer: Adán Jodorowsky

Natalia Lafourcade chronology
| Un Canto por México, Vol. 2 (2021) | De Todas las Flores (2022) | Live at Carnegie Hall (2024) |

Singles from De Todas las Flores
- 1. "De Todas las Flores" Released: 22 September 2022; 2. "Mi Manera de Querer" Released: 26 October 2022

De Todas las Flores (transl. Of All the Flowers) is the tenth studio album by Mexican singer-songwriter Natalia Lafourcade. It was released on 28 October 2022 on Sony Music Mexico. It draws inspiration from a variety of Latin jazz and folk genres, including bolero, cumbia, bossa nova, samba, and son jarocho.

== Background and recording ==
De Todas las Flores became Lafourcade's first project of completely original material in seven years, since her fifth studio album Hasta la Raíz (2015). The album was produced by French-Mexican musician Adán Jodorowsky, once a neighbor of Lafourcade in Mexico City, who also enlisted American guitarist Marc Ribot, American bassist Sebastian Steinberg, and French percussionist Cyril Atef to play on the album. Pianist and arranger Emilio Dorantes also performs on the album.

Lafourcade described the album as her "musical diary," exploring heartbreak, loss, and grief themes. She drew inspiration from nature, especially her home garden in Xalapa, Veracruz. The album's title "references the inner flowers that have withered and the ones still blooming." Lafourcade's influences for the album include Violeta Parra, Omara Portuondo, and Joni Mitchell.

The album was recorded entirely on analog tape in a Texas town near El Paso.

== Critical reception ==
Professional ratings
Review scores
| Source | Rating |
|---|---|
| AllMusic | 5/5 stars |

De Todas las Flores was met with critical acclaim, with several publications listing it among the best albums of 2022. AllMusic's Thom Jurek praised the album's "exquisite taste, emotion, and adventure," describing Lafourcade's singing as "warm, immediate, intimate, and commanding."

=== Year-end lists ===
| Publication | Accolade | Rank | Ref. |
|---|---|---|---|
| NPR Music | The 50 Best Albums of 2022 | 15 | |
| Rolling Stone | The 100 Best Albums of 2022 | 95 | |
| Rolling Stone | The 50 Best Spanish-language Albums of 2022 | 7 | |
| The San Diego Union-Tribune | 2022's Best Albums | N/A | |
| Slant Magazine | The 50 Best Albums of 2022 | 33 | |

=== Accolades ===
List of awards and nominations received by De Todas las Flores
| Year | Award | Category | Result | Ref. |
|---|---|---|---|---|
| 2023 | Rolling Stone en Español Awards | Album of the Year | Won | |
| 2023 | Latin Grammy Awards | Album of the Year | Nominated | |
| 2023 | Latin Grammy Awards | Best Singer-Songwriter Album | Won | |
| 2024 | Grammy Awards | Best Latin Rock or Alternative Album | Won | |

== Track listing ==
All tracks are written by Natalia Lafourcade, exceptions listed where noted.

De Todas las Flores track listing
| No. | Title | Length |
|---|---|---|
| 1. | "Vine Solita" | 6:26 |
| 2. | "De Todas las Flores" | 5:22 |
| 3. | "Pasan los Días" | 6:43 |
| 4. | "Llévame Viento" | 6:25 |
| 5. | "El Lugar Correcto" | 3:51 |
| 6. | "Pajarito Colibrí" | 5:08 |
| 7. | "María la Curandera" | 6:13 |
| 8. | "Caminar Bonito" | 3:57 |
| 9. | "Mi Manera de Querer" | 3:53 |
| 10. | "Muerte" (Rodolfo David Aguilar Dorantes) | 5:49 |
| 11. | "Canta la Arena" (Dorantes) | 6:02 |
| 12. | "Que te Vaya Bonito, Nicolás" | 6:47 |
| Total length: | | 66:36 |

== Charts ==
Chart performance for De Todas las Flores
| Chart (2023) | Peak position |
|---|---|
| Spanish Albums (Promusicae) | 94 |
