= Natalia Lafourcade (album) =

2002 studio album by Natalia Lafourcade

Studio album by Natalia Lafourcade
- Released: 8 July 2002
- Recorded: 2001–2002
- Genres: Latin rock; Latin pop; bossa nova
- Length: 50:19
- Language: Spanish
- Labels: Sony; Epic
- Producers: Áureo Baqueiro; Loris Ceroni

Natalia Lafourcade chronology
Natalia Lafourcade (2002)	Casa (2005)

Singles from Natalia Lafourcade
- 1. "Busca un Problema" Released: 2002; 2. "En el 2000" Released: 2002; 3. "Te Quiero Dar" Released: 2003; 4. "Elefantes" Released: 2003

Professional ratings
Review scores
Source	Rating
AllMusic	4/5 stars

Natalia Lafourcade is the debut studio album by Mexican singer-songwriter Natalia Lafourcade, released on 8 July 2002 by Sony Music Mexico. The album features songs primarily written by Lafourcade and was produced by Áureo Baqueiro and Loris Ceroni. Musically, it incorporates a blend of Latin rock, Latin pop, and bossa nova elements.

The album spawned several successful singles, including "Busca un Problema" and "En el 2000", the latter of which became one of the most influential Spanish-language songs of the 2000s. Tracks from the album were also featured in popular media, with "En el 2000" appearing in the 2002 film Amar te duele and "Mírate, Mírame" included in the soundtrack of the telenovela Clase 406 (2002).

Commercially, Natalia Lafourcade topped the Mexican albums chart and was certified Platinum by the Asociación Mexicana de Productores de Fonogramas y Videogramas (AMPROFON) for sales exceeding 150,000 copies in Mexico. The album earned Lafourcade two nominations at the 4th Latin Grammy Awards for Best New Artist and Best Rock Solo Vocal Album, as well as a nomination for Best Latin Pop Album at the 46th Grammy Awards.

== Accolades ==
Awards	Category	Result	Ref.
4th Latin Grammy Awards	Best Rock Solo Vocal Album	Nominated	
4th Latin Grammy Awards	Best New Artist	Nominated	
46th Grammy Awards	Best Latin Pop Album	Nominated	

== Track listing ==
All tracks are written by Natalia Lafourcade, except where noted.

Natalia Lafourcade track listing
No.	Title	Writer(s)	Length
1.	"Introducción"		0:36
2.	"Busca Un Problema"		3:06
3.	"En el 2000"		3:35
4.	"El Destino"		3:04
5.	"Mango"		2:36
6.	"Elefantes"		4:09
7.	"Otra Vez"	Lafourcade; Loris Ceroni	3:45
8.	"Te Quiero Dar"		4:24
9.	"Georgina"		3:57
10.	"Mírame, Mírate"	Mauricio L. Arriaga	3:58
11.	"Noche Divina"	Lafourcade; Arriaga; Ceroni	3:57
12.	"Mañana Olvidaré"		4:15
13.	"Mango" (Remix)		4:49
14.	"Elefantes" (Acústica)		4:01
Total length:			50:19

== Charts ==
Chart performance for Natalia Lafourcade
Chart (2002)	Peak position
Mexican Albums (AMPROFON)	1

== Certifications ==
Certifications for Natalia Lafourcade
Region	Certification	Certified units/sales
Mexico (AMPROFON)	Platinum	150,000^{^}
^{^} Shipments figures based on certification alone.
