= Casa (Natalia y La Forquetina album) =

2005 studio album by Natalia Lafourcade

Studio album by Natalia y la Forquetina
- Released: 29 August 2005
- Recorded: 2004–2005
- Genres: Alternative; rock en español
- Language: Spanish
- Labels: Sony BMG; Epic
- Producer: Emmanuel del Real

Natalia y la Forquetina chronology
Natalia Lafourcade (2002)	Casa (2005)	Las 4 Estaciones del Amor (2008)

Singles from Casa
- 1. "Ser Humano" Released: 2005; 2. "Casa" Released: 2005; 3. "O Pato (Un Pato)" Released: 2006; 4. "Solamente Te Lo Doy A Tí" Released: 2006

Casa is the second studio album by Mexican singer-songwriter Natalia Lafourcade, released under the name of her band, Natalia y La Forquetina. It was released in Mexico on 30 August 2005 by Sony BMG Mexico. The album won Best Rock Album by a Duo or Group with Vocal at the 7th Latin Grammy Awards.

The single "Solamente Te Lo Doy a Ti" was featured on the soundtrack of the Mexican film Niñas mal (2007), while the bonus track "O Pato (Un Pato)" had previously appeared on the soundtrack of Temporada de patos (2004). Casa reached number one on the Mexican albums chart and was certified Gold by the Asociación Mexicana de Productores de Fonogramas y Videogramas (AMPROFON) for sales exceeding 50,000 copies in Mexico.

== Track listing ==
No.	Title	Length
1.	"En tus Ojos"	3:59
2.	"El Amor es Rosa"	3:58
3.	"Casa"	3:58
4.	"Gusano"	3:35
5.	"Cuarto Encima"	4:19
6.	"Alimento de la Vida"	3:15
7.	"Suelo"	3:41
8.	"En Dirección Contraria"	4:17
9.	"Saúl"	3:11
10.	"Ser Humano"	3:31
11.	"Tic Tac"	2:51
12.	"Con las Hojas las Hormigas"	4:11
13.	"Solamente te lo Doy a Ti"	3:48
14.	"Cuando Todo Cambia"	3:23
15.	"O Pato (Un Pato)" (Bonus Track)	2:17

== Charts and certifications ==
=== Charts ===
Chart	Peak position
Mexican Album Chart	1

=== Certification ===
Region	Certification	Certified units/sales
Mexico (AMPROFON)	Gold	50,000^{^}
^{^} Shipments figures based on certification alone.
