= Cheche Alara =

Musician

Ezequiel "Cheche" Alara is a Grammy and Latin Grammy-winning music composer, producer, music director, conductor and keyboardist.

He is the composer for "The Titan Games" on NBC (hosted by Dwayne "The Rock" Johnson), "Death by Magic" (Netflix), "To Tell The Truth" (ABC).

He has been the musical director and Conductor for the Grammy Awards Premiere Show (2017, 2019 and 2024), six editions of the Latin Grammys "Person of the Year" Concert galas (Placido Domingo, Caetano Veloso, Alejandro Sanz, Shakira, Miguel Bosé and José Jose), Mike Patton, Jordan Smith's PBS Christmas Special (featuring David Foster) for various of the American Idol concert tours', The Tonight Show, and for touring and recording musicians including Christina Aguilera, Pink, Thalía, and Lady Gaga.

He has produced albums for Natalia Lafourcade, including Musas, Vol. 1 (winner of the 2017 Latin Grammy for "Best Folk Album", and 2018 Grammy nominee for "Best Latin Pop Album"), and Musas, Vol. 2 (winner of the 2018 Latin Grammy for "Best Folk Album", and 2019 Grammy nominee for "Best Latin Pop Album"), Claudia Brant (winner of the 2019 Grammy for "Best Latin Pop Album"), Il Volo, Estopa, Thalía, and many others. As a producer, Cheche has multiple nominations for Grammys and Latin Grammys, including Album of the Year and Song of the Year.

== Career history ==
Alara obtained a B.A. in Arranging/Orchestration from Berklee College of Music in Boston and a master's degree in Jazz Studies from the University of Southern California.

Alara was a participant in the Playing for Change charitable multimedia music project in 2011, playing keyboards on PFC 2: Songs Around the World. For the Lady Gaga song, "Americano", on the 2011 album, Born This Way, Alara recruited the all-female mariachi group Trio Ellas. In 2015, Alara produced the Spanish version of L'amore si muove, by Il Volo. Alara has acted as a producer and musical director for Natalia Lafourcade, and played keyboards for Lafourcade's CDMX: Music from Mexico City performance in October 2017.

Alara was nominated for the Latin Grammy Award for Album of the Year in the 18th Annual Latin Grammy Awards for his production of Lafourcade's Musas (Un Homenaje al Folclore Latinoamericano en Manos de Los Macorinos, Vol. 1). In November 2018, Alara won the Grammy for Muses at the Latin Grammy Awards. It was announced in January 2019 that Alara would serve as musical director for the 61st Annual Grammy Awards. Alara was announced as musical director for the 62nd Annual Grammy Awards in January 2020.

Alara has also worked in a variety of capacities on numerous albums, including:

- Habítame Siempre by Thalía (as producer)
- Born This Way by Lady Gaga (arranger, composer, instrumentation)
  - Americano (as writer)
- Born This Way: The Remix (as composer)
- Luna Llena by Mariana Ochoa (director, keyboards)
- American Idol Season 5: Encores (keyboards)
- Glee: The Music, Season 4, Volume 1 by the cast of the American musical television series Glee (as composer)
- MTV Unplugged by Alejandro Sanz (as director)
- Another Cinderella Story (as writer of the "Valentine's Dance Tango")
- Primera Fila (Thalía album) by Thalía (performing)
- Christina Aguilera in Concert (keyboards)

In addition, Alara was a musician on The Bonnie Hunt Show, and composed for 27 episodes of the 2016 version of To Tell the Truth, and for the Dwayne Johnson-created show The Titan Games.
