= Nunca Es Suficiente =

2015 single by Natalia Lafourcade

Single by Natalia Lafourcade

from the album Hasta la Raíz
- Released: February 10, 2015
- Studio: The Underground Studio at Hotel El Ganzo (Los Cabos); Sonic Ranch (El Paso)
- Genre: Latin pop
- Length: 3:57
- Label: Sony Mexico; RCA
- Songwriters: Daniela Azpiazu; Natalia Lafourcade; Anthony López
- Producers: Natalia Lafourcade; Cachorro López

Natalia Lafourcade singles chronology
| "Hasta la Raíz" (2015) | "Nunca Es Suficiente" (2015) | "Lo Que Construimos" (2015) |

Music video
- "Nunca Es Suficiente" on YouTube

"Nunca Es Suficiente" (transl. "It's Never Enough") is a song by Mexican singer-songwriter Natalia Lafourcade from her fifth studio album Hasta la Raíz (2015). The song was released on February 10, 2015, by Sony Music México as the second single from the album. It was written by Lafourcade alongside Daniela Azpiazu, Anthony López and was produced with Argentine producer Cachorro López, who also produced many of the songs from the album.

"Nunca Es Suficiente" was met with positive reviews from music critics. It garnered commercial success, being one of her most commercially successful songs alongside "Hasta la Raíz". A cumbia version of the song was released in 2018 with Mexican group Los Ángeles Azules, to great commercial success. The version won Regional Mexican Song of the Year at the 2020 Billboard Latin Music Awards.

== Background and release ==
In 2012, Lafourcade released Mujer Divina – Homenaje a Agustín Lara, a tribute album to Mexican singer and songwriter Agustín Lara, consisting of songs composed by him. The album came after Lafourcade explored Lara's catalog for a performance finding a deep connection to his work. Mujer Divina was met with critical acclaim while Lara's songs inspired her next album. Her following album, Hasta la Raíz, was released in 2015 after a year where Lafourcade visited different places including Veracruz, Colombia, and Cuba seeking peace and inspiration for the writing process. Hasta la Raíz was inspired by Mexico, according to Lafourcade, "one of the things that I wanted to happen with this album was to find again the connection of Mexico with its people". In addition, Lara's music was the "closest and immediate reference" for the composition of the songs. The album was her sixth project overall as well as her first album of original material since Hu Hu Hu, released in 2009.

"Nunca Es Suficiente" was first released as a promotional single on January 21, 2015. On February 10, 2015, the song was issued as the second single from the album. The song appeared as the ninth track in Lafourcade's 2020 album Un Canto por México, Vol. 1. It was one of four songs from Hasta la Raíz to appear in the album, the others being "Hasta la Raíz", "Para Qué Sufrir" and "Lo Que Construimos".

== Composition and recording ==
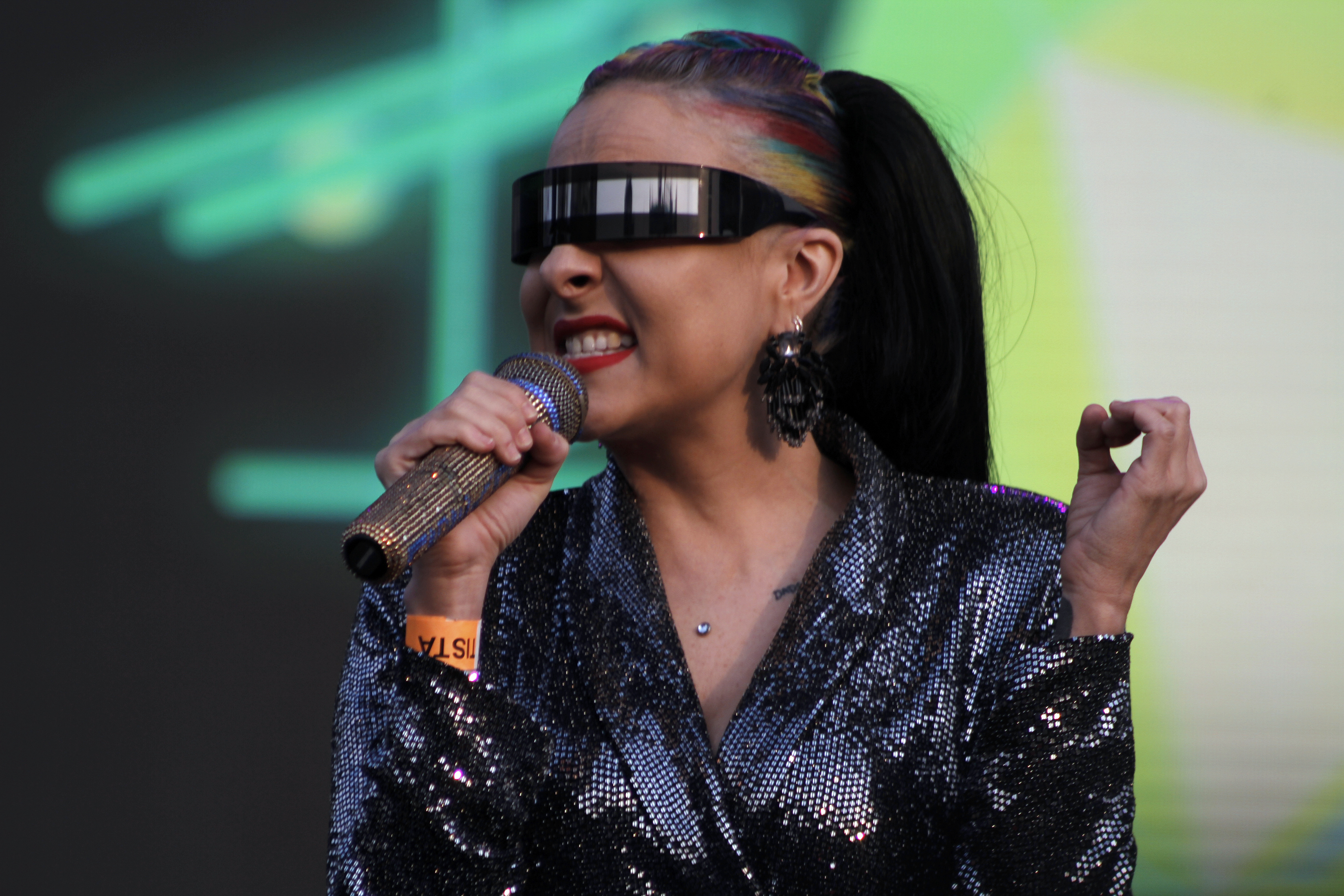
Lafourcade co-wrote "Nunca Es Suficiente" with Daniela Azpiazu (pictured), Anthony López, first intended for Paulina Rubio

Mexico and Lara's music as well as various Latin American songwriters like Violeta Parra, Caetano Veloso, Chavela Vargas, Simón Díaz and Mercedes Sosa, served as inspirations for the composition of Hasta la Raíz. The album ranges through various genres and moods with love as the major theme of the songs, Lafourcade commented: "I dedicate the album to love and heartbreak, and to the fragile moments we have as people".

"Nunca Es Suficiente" was written by Anthony López, Lafourcade alongside Daniela Azpiazu from the Mexican electronic group María Daniela y su Sonido Lasser, and produced by Lafourcade and Cachorro López. It was recorded at two studios in the United States, The Underground Studio at Hotel El Ganzo in Los Cabos, Baja California and Sonic Ranch in El Paso, Texas. Originally intended as a song for Mexican singer Paulina Rubio, the song was conceived at a time where Lafourcade and Azpiazu wanted to write songs for other artists and received an invitation to do so. It was composed at Lafourcade's house after the two talked about their experiences with love and heartbreak. After finishing it, they decided to keep the song and use it for any of their projects, ultimately including it in Lafourcade's album. Described by Lafourcade as "honest and easy", the song deals with the emotions towards a dysfunctional relationship and the dissatisfaction that comes from wanting more than what it offers.

== Critical reception ==
The song received positive reviews from music critics. Mariano Prunes from AllMusic included the song as one of the "stellar songs" that made the spine of the album, writing that the songs "all cut from the same heartbreakingly disarming cloth and all capable of rendering that elusive happy/sad feeling that is the magic secret ingredient of both Hasta la Raíz and profoundly romantic music". Prunes as well as Sebas Alonso from Jenesaispop likened "Nunca Es Suficiente" to the 1974 song "Porque te vas" by Spanish singer Jeanette, finding influences from 70's Spanish pop music. Matt Hobbs from WePlugGoodMusic described the song as "an intelligent mix of mid-tempo reggae rhythms and a consistent acoustic energy wrapped in a bossa nova environment".

== Commercial performance ==
In Mexico, the song entered various charts. "Nunca Es Suficiente" appeared in the Mexico Airplay and Mexico Espanol Airplay charts, both published by Billboard, peaking at numbers seventeen and four, respectively. In addition, the song peaked at number five at Mexico's Monitor Latino Pop Chart. On October 20, 2015, the song was certified gold in Mexico, as of 2023, the song is certified diamond plus two times platinum, being one of her highest selling singles in the country.

== Music video ==
The music video for the song was directed by Martín Bautista from the production company Los Maestros and was shot in Mexico. It stars Lafourcade alongside actors Diana Lein, Gustavo Sánchez Parra and Tenoch Huerta portraying two couples at contrasting points of their relationships. While Lein and Sánchez Parra play a happy, loving couple, Lafourcade and Huerta fight and argue. The video was uploaded to Lafourcade's YouTube channel on March 20, 2015. As of 2023, it holds over 130 million views.

== Credits and personnel ==
The following credits are from Hasta la Raíz album liner notes.

- Natalia Lafourcade – producer, vocals, acoustic guitar, keyboard
- Cachorro López – producer
- Alan Ortíz – programming and sampling
- Gustavo Guerrero – electric guitar, sampling
- Uriel Herrera – drums, percussion
- Mariana Ruiz – bass guitar

== Charts ==
=== Weekly charts ===
Weekly chart performance for "Nunca Es Suficiente"
| Chart (2015) | Peak position |
|---|---|
| Mexico Pop (Monitor Latino) | 5 |
| Mexico Espanol Airplay (Billboard) | 4 |
| Mexico Airplay (Billboard) | 17 |

=== Year-end charts ===
Year-end chart performance for "Nunca Es Suficiente"
| Chart (2015) | Position |
|---|---|
| Mexico Pop (Monitor Latino) | 10 |

== Certifications ==
Certifications for "Nunca Es Suficiente"
| Region | Certification | Certified units/sales |
|---|---|---|
| Mexico (AMPROFON) | 2× Diamond+Platinum+Gold | 690,000^{‡} |
^{‡} Sales+streaming figures based on certification alone.

== Los Ángeles Azules version ==
"Nunca Es Suficiente"

Single by Los Ángeles Azules And Natalia Lafourcade

from the album Esto Sí Es Cumbia
- Released: April 20, 2018
- Genre: Mexican cumbia
- Length: 4:26
- Label: Promotodo
- Songwriters: Natalia Lafourcade; Daniela Azpiazu
- Producer: Camilo Lara

Los Ángeles Azules singles chronology
| "Mi Cantar" (2017) | "Nunca Es Suficiente" (2018) | "Ni Contigo Ni Sin Ti" (2018) |

Natalia Lafourcade singles chronology
| "Desdeñosa" (2018) | "Nunca Es Suficiente" (2018) | "Una Vida" (2020) |

Live video
- "Nunca Es Suficiente" on YouTube

A cumbia version of the song was released on April 20, 2018, by Mexican group Los Ángeles Azules, as a single for their 2018 album Esto Sí Es Cumbia. Lafourcade appears as a featured artist in the song. It was produced by Camilo Lara, with arrangements by Jorge Mejía-Avante and mixing by Abelardo Rivera.

The version achieved great commercial success. In Mexico, the song appeared on the Mexico Airplay chart, peaking at number seven. On August 28, 2020, it was certified diamond and platinum in the country. In the United States, the song entered various charts. It peaked at number seven on the Hot Latin Songs chart, being Lafourcade's highest appearance there. At the Regional Mexican Songs, the song reached number one, being Lafourcade's first and only number one in the chart, while it marked the first number-one song in the chart for Los Ángeles Azules since 1999's "El Liston de Tu Pelo". Lastly, it peaked at number nine at the Bubbling Under Hot 100, being the first and only appearance to date for both artists in the list.

At the Latin American Music Awards of 2019, the collaboration was nominated for Favorite Regional Mexican Song while at the 2020 Billboard Latin Music Awards, it won Regional Mexican Song of the Year. Billboard included the song in their list "50 Essential Latin Songs of the Decade", published in 2019, calling it "the collaboration you never knew you needed".

A live video of the song was uploaded to YouTube on April 18, 2018. Recorded at Progreso, Yucatán and directed by Diego Álvarez, the video surpassed a billion views in 2020, making Los Ángeles Azules the first Mexican group to achieve that. As of May 2026, the video has received over 2.3 billion views on YouTube.

=== Charts ===
==== Weekly charts ====
Weekly chart performance for "Nunca Es Suficiente" (Los Ángeles Azules Version)
| Chart (2018–2019) | Peak position |
|---|---|
| Mexico Airplay (Billboard) | 7 |
| US Hot Latin Songs (Billboard) | 7 |
| US Regional Mexican Airplay (Billboard) | 1 |
| US Bubbling Under Hot 100 (Billboard) | 9 |

==== Year-end charts ====
Year-end chart performance for "Nunca Es Suficiente" (Los Ángeles Azules Version)
| Chart (2019) | Position |
|---|---|
| Hot Latin Songs (Billboard) | 26 |
| Regional Mexican Songs (Billboard) | 2 |

=== Certifications ===
Certifications for "Nunca Es Suficiente" (Los Ángeles Azules Version)
| Region | Certification | Certified units/sales |
|---|---|---|
| Mexico (AMPROFON) | Diamond+Platinum | 360,000^{‡} |
^{‡} Sales+streaming figures based on certification alone.
