= Hasta la Raíz (song) =

Single by Natalia Lafourcade

from the album Hasta la Raíz
- Released: January 6, 2015
- Studio: The Underground Studio at Hotel Gonzo (Los Cabos)
- Genre: Huapango; neofolk
- Length: 3:41
- Label: Sony Mexico; RCA
- Songwriters: Natalia Lafourcade; Leonel García
- Producers: Natalia Lafourcade; Cachorro López

Natalia Lafourcade singles chronology
"Aventurera" (2013)	"Hasta la Raíz" (2015)	"Nunca Es Suficiente" (2015)

Music video
- "Hasta la Raíz" on YouTube

"Hasta la Raíz" (transl. "Down to the Root") is a song by Mexican singer-songwriter Natalia Lafourcade, the first track on her 2015 studio album of the same name. It was released as the album's lead single on January 6, 2015, through Sony Music Mexico. After attaining success from her previous album, Mujer Divina – Homenaje a Agustín Lara, a tribute to Mexican singer-songwriter Agustín Lara, Lafourcade decided to record an album with original recordings. Lafourcade spent three years writing, searching for inspiration in different cities, resulting in songs with personal feelings regarding love. Lafourcade wrote the song with Mexican artist Leonel García and produced it with Argentine musician Cachorro López.

"Hasta la Raíz" received positive reviews from music critics and achieved commercial success, peaking at number 17 on the Billboard Latin Pop Songs chart in the United States and number five in Mexico. Its music video, directed by Alonso Ruizpalacios and filmed at Estudios Churubusco in Mexico City, featured 300 fans who responded to an open invitation posted by Lafourcade on social media. The video was included in Latin Post's list of the 10 best Latin music videos of 2015. At the 16th Latin Grammy Awards, "Hasta la Raíz" won Record of the Year, Song of the Year, and Best Alternative Song. In 2025, Rolling Stone ranked it as the 2nd greatest Spanish-language song of the 21st century.

== Background and release ==
In 2010, Natalia Lafourcade joined Mexican orchestra conductor Alondra de la Parra on the album Travieso Carmesí, a musical project created to celebrate the Bicentennial of Mexico. Lafourcade analyzed Mexican singer-songwriter Agustín Lara's catalogue and decided to record a tribute album with his songs, since the singer wanted to give herself the opportunity to perform songs written by another person. In 2014, Lafourcade wanted to find a balance between heart, mind and body, and traveled to Veracruz, Colombia and Cuba, searching for inspiration to write new music. "This [new] album was made parallel to the experience of singing the Lara's music... is the result of my need to be proud of my songs." Lafourcade said to Vívelo Hoy. The album Hasta la Raíz is Lafourcade's sixth studio album and is her first album of original material in six years, since Hu Hu Hu (2009) and was produced by Argentine musician Cachorro López, Mexican singer-songwriter Leonel García and herself after another record producer became very expensive.

"Hasta la Raíz" was released for digital download on January 6, 2015, as the album's lead single. A new version entitled "Canova's Root Version" followed on May 19, 2015. Lafourcade included the song on the live EP Spotify Sessions. "Hasta la Raíz" is featured in the Italian edition of the album series Now Summer Hits 2015.

== Writing and recording ==
The beginning of "Hasta la Raíz"
A sample of the song, written by Lafourcade and Mexican artist Leonel García, which incorporates elements of huapango music.

Lafourcade overcame writer's block, but felt that the songs she wrote were too similar compared to her previous albums, so she sought inspiration from Lara's repertoire and her native country, Mexico. "One of the things I wanted to happen with this record was to find the connection with Mexico and its people again. I am Mexican proud of the positive parts that Mexico have, which are many." Musically, the singer wanted simplicity. Lafourcade forced herself to write "without judgement", recording voice memos on her phone during the process. The singer was also inspired by the work of Latin American songwriters such as Simón Díaz, Violeta Parra, Mercedes Sosa, Chavela Vargas, and Caetano Veloso. While recording demos, Lafourcade realized that the songs were more direct and emotional than her previous work. The writing process took three years to complete, resulting in approximately 30 songs, from which the singer selected "the strongest ones" since the album was about her personal life and she wanted to record the best of the bunch to represent it, "more than making an album, I wanted to have songs... songs that could stand on their own."

"Hasta la Raíz" was written by Lafourcade and Mexican singer-songwriter Leonel García, since Lafourcade wanted to experiment with other composers on her music and they became friends while working on her album Mujer Divina – Homenaje a Agustín Lara and his album Todas Mías (2012). García had an idea about the song, and they finished together the music. Laforcade referred to this collaboration as "magical", with this song being an anthem to the human strength, without forgetting our roots, "It came out of a conversation about maintaining a sense of connection to where you come from." Throughout the song, Lafourcade sings about a lover that taught her how to love and cannot forget despite the distance between them. García played a huapango riff, and Lafourcade started singing along while producer Cachorro López recorded everything, and the final result is from that session.

== Critical reception ==
After its release, "Hasta la Raíz" received positive reviews from music critics. Luis Romero of the website Coffee and Saturday and the music editor of Televisa Espectáculos were in agreement that the song keeps a musical style similar to her previous album, Mujer Divina, with Agustin Lara's influence being evident. Andrew Casillas of Club Fonograma stated that the song sounds "rich", but resembles Chilean singer-songwriter Camila Moreno, and that even if it "doesn't sound like a bold step outward for Natalia, there's certainly no need to lower your expectations". Lissette Corsa, of MTV Iggy, declared that the "staccato strumming" of the track "evokes the huapango rhythm of Veracruz, Mexico, Lafourcade’s hometown". Lafourcade performed the track at the Latin Grammy Awards of 2015, where it won Record of the Year, Song of the Year and Best Alternative Song. The song was named by Rolling Stone in 2025 as the 2nd greatest Spanish-language song of the 21st century.

== Commercial reception ==
"Hasta la Raíz" peaked at number five in Mexico's Monitor Latino Pop Songs chart, and 27 in the Mexico Airplay charts, respectively. In the United States, the track peaked at number 17 in the Billboard Latin Pop Songs chart, becoming Lafourcade's more successful song there. Following Lafourcade's performance at the Latin Grammys, the song climbed to number nine on the Billboard Latin Pop Digital Songs, with a sales increase of 86%, selling 1,000 downloads. In 2022, "Hasta la Raíz" entered the Billboard-published charts in Mexico and Bolivia, with peaks of 11 and 16, respectively. It also reached number 188 on the Billboard Global 200.

== Music video ==
The music video was directed by Alonso Ruizpalacios, at the Estudios Churubusco in Mexico City, gathering 300 fans who responded to an invitation posted by Lafourcade in social media. The singer asked her fans to send a thought inspired by the song or a personal story derived from their identification with "Hasta la Raíz". Lafourcade told to Variety Latino: "I thought that we would get few answers, but we received almost 800 responses immediately, and later it turned into a riot and we did not know if they would get out of control, but nothing happened, my fans are super cool.". In the video, shot in black and white, Lafourcade is surrounded by several people who lead her to a stage to perform the last part of the song, in the meantime, Lafourcade throws flowers in the air, kisses a man and plays a guitar. According to Milly Contreras of Latin Post the video "shows off the singer's individuality and simplicity" and included it at number 7 in the list for the "10 Best Latin Music Videos of 2015".

== Track listing ==
- Digital download and streaming
1. "Hasta la Raíz" – 3:41
- Digital download and streaming – Canova's Root Version
1. "Hasta la Raíz (Canova's Root Version)" – 3:39

== Credits and personnel ==
Credits adapted from the liner notes of Hasta la Raíz.

- Natalia Lafourcade – vocals, producer, keyboards, electric guitar, percussion
- Cachorro López – producer
- Leonel García – acoustic guitar, voice director
- Alan Ortíz – programming
- Gustavo Guerrero – electric guitar, percussion
- Uriel Herrera – drums, percussion
- José Lugo – percussion
- Mariana Ruiz – bass guitar

== Charts ==
Chart performance for "Hasta la Raíz"
Chart (2015–2022)	Peak position
Bolivia (Billboard)	16
Global 200 (Billboard)	188
Mexico (Billboard)	11
Mexico Airplay (Billboard)	17
Mexico Pop (Monitor Latino)	5
US Latin Pop Airplay (Billboard)	17
Venezuela (Monitor Latino)	6

== Certifications ==
Certifications for "Hasta la Raíz"
Region	Certification	Certified units/sales
Italy (FIMI)	Gold	25,000^{‡}
Mexico (AMPROFON)	6× Diamond+3× Platinum+Gold	2,010,000^{‡}
Spain (Promusicae)	Platinum	60,000^{‡}
United States (RIAA)	Diamond (Latin)	600,000^{‡}
^{‡} Sales+streaming figures based on certification alone.

== Release history ==
Release dates and formats for "Hasta la Raíz"
Region	Date	Format(s)	Version	Label	Ref.
Various	January 6, 2015	Digital download; streaming	Original	Sony Mexico	
Various	May 19, 2015	Digital download; streaming	Canova's Root	Sony Mexico	
