= El David Aguilar =

Mexican singer-songwriter (born 1983)

- Born: Rodolfo David Aguilar Dorantes; June 17, 1983 (age 43); Culiacán, Mexico
- Occupation: Singer-songwriter
- Years active: 2003–present
- Label: Universal Music

Rodolfo David Aguilar Dorantes (born June 17, 1983), better known as El David Aguilar is a Mexican singer-songwriter. He was released several studio albums, both independently and under a record label, and has worked with artists such as Mon Laferte, Jorge Drexler and Natalia Lafourcade. He has received nine Latin Grammy Award nominations, including a nomination for Album of the Year and three for Song of the Year.

== Career ==
Aguilar began his career releasing several albums independently through the 2000s, Frágil in 2004, Tornazul in 2005, Grabadora Portátil in 2008 and Estelar and Ventarrón, both in 2010. Ventarrón was an album more leaned towards Mexican regional music that included the original songs "El Niño Perdido" and "La Cuchi" alongside other songs from the genre, Aguilar said about the album that "in all the other songs I sing the lyrics as if they were mine, they include the heartbroken polka "Nadie", a ranchera called "Gaviota" and "Fogata", a son that talks about the weather in Culiacán". In 2010, he also composed the songs in the album Eco by Áaron Cruz Trio (Áaron Cruz, Hernán Hecht and Mark Aanderud), released in 2011. He started using the name "El David Aguilar", adding the article "el" (the in Spanish) to his own name, in 2010 after searching for available web domains and finding out that the ones with his name alone were already taken.

In May 2014, he released his self titled album El David Aguilar, the album received considerately more promotion than his previous efforts, being available in different digital platforms and record stores, the album also featured a more diverse instrumentation aside from just the vocals and the guitar. In 2017, he co-wrote the song "Abracadabras" with Jorge Drexler for his album Salvavidas de Hielo (2017), the song is performed by Drexler alongside Julieta Venegas in the album, he also co-wrote "Soledad y el Mar" and "Danza de Gardenias" with Natalia Lafourcade for her albums Musas (2017) and Musas, Vol. 2 (2018), respectively. Also in 2017, he released Siguiente, the album featured a different producer for each track including producers such as Alan Saucedo, Miguel Inzunza and David Bravo, among others. At the 19th Annual Latin Grammy Awards, Aguilar received five nominations, Album of the Year and Best Singer-Songwriter Album, both for Siguiente, two nominations for Song of the Year for "Embrujo" and "Danza de Gardenias" and Best New Artist.

In 2018, Aguilar collaborated in Mon Laferte's Norma, featuring in the song "Si Alguna Vez" as well as co-writing some songs from the album. In 2020, he released Reciente, the album was nominated for Best Singer-Songwriter Album at the 21st Annual Latin Grammy Awards while "Causa Perdida", a song from the album, was nominated for Best Alternative Song the year prior, at the 20th Annual Latin Grammy Awards. In 2021, he published the book Afuerismos del Interior, composed of a compilation of tweets he made from 2010 to 2019. During the same year he collaborated again with Mon Laferte, in her album Seis, for the song "Que Se Sepa Nuestro Amor", Aguilar received nominations for Song of the Year and Best Regional Mexican Song at the 22nd Annual Latin Grammy Awards as songwriter. In 2022, he released Agendas Vencidas, produced by Adán Jodorowsky.

== Discography ==
- Frágil (2004)
- Tornazul (2005)
- Grabadora Portátil (2008)
- Estelar (2010)
- Ventarrón (2010)
- El David Aguilar (2014)
- Siguiente (2017)
- Reciente (2020)
- Agendas Vencidas (2022)
- Compita del Destino (2024)

== Awards and nominations ==
=== Latin Grammy Awards ===
| Year | Category | Nominated work | Result | Ref. |
|---|---|---|---|---|
| 2018 | Best New Artist | Himself | Nominated | |
| 2018 | Album of the Year | Siguiente | Nominated | |
| 2018 | Best Singer-Songwriter Album | Siguiente | Nominated | |
| 2018 | Song of the Year | "Embrujo" | Nominated | |
| 2018 | Song of the Year | "Danza de Gardenias" (as songwriter) | Nominated | |
| 2019 | Best Alternative Song | "Causa Perdida" | Nominated | |
| 2020 | Best Singer-Songwriter Album | Reciente (Adelanto) | Nominated | |
| 2021 | Song of the Year | "Que Se Sepa Nuestro Amor" (as songwriter) | Nominated | |
| 2021 | Best Regional Mexican Song | "Que Se Sepa Nuestro Amor" (as songwriter) | Nominated | |
| 2022 | Best Singer-Songwriter Album | Agendas Vencidas | Nominated | |
| 2024 | Best Singer-Songwriter Album | Compita del Destino | Nominated | |
| 2024 | Best Singer-Songwriter Song | "Luz de Cabeza" | Nominated | |
| 2025 | Best Roots Song | "Como Quisiera Quererte" | Pending | |
| 2025 | Best Roots Song | "El Palomo y la Negra" (as songwriter) | Pending | |
