= Un Canto por México, Vol. 1 =

Studio album by Natalia Lafourcade
- Released: May 8, 2020
- Recorded: 2019
- Genres: Folk; bolero; son jarocho
- Length: 63:01
- Language: Spanish
- Label: Sony Music Mexico
- Producer: Kiko Campos

Natalia Lafourcade chronology
Musas, Vol. 2 (2017)	Un Canto por México, Vol. 1 (2020)	Un Canto por México, Vol. 2 (2021)

Singles from Un Canto por México, Vol. 1
- 1. "Una Vida" Released: December 5, 2019; 2. "Veracruz" Released: February 21, 2020

Un Canto por México, Vol. 1 (English: A Song for México, Volume 1), is the eighth studio album by Mexican singer-songwriter Natalia Lafourcade, based on a concert made on November 4, 2019 called Un canto por México para la reconstrucción del Centro de Documentación del Son Jarocho. It was released on May 8, 2020.

At the 21st Annual Latin Grammy Awards in 2020, Lafourcade won three awards, Best Alternative Song for "En Cantos" with ILe and Ismael Cancel, Best Regional Mexican Song for "Mi Religión" and Album of the Year for the album, becoming the third woman to win this award as the main artist, after Shakira won for Fijación Oral Vol. 1 in 2006 and Rosalía won for El Mal Querer in 2019. Also, the album won Best Regional Mexican Music Album (including Tejano) at the 63rd Annual Grammy Awards, being her second Grammy after winning Best Latin Rock or Alternative Album for Hasta la Raíz in 2016.

== Background ==
The album was part of a project destined for the reconstruction of the Centro de Documentación del Son Jarocho at Jáltipan de Morelos, a cultural building that was damaged after the 2017 Puebla earthquake on 19 September 2017. Her experiences with the project, the community associated, the foundation Pienza Sostenible and the Mexican group Los Cojolites, sparked her interest in Son jarocho, a Mexican regional folk musical style from Veracruz and served as inspiration for the album.

The concert, on which the album is based, was performed on November 4, 2019, at the Auditorio Nacional in México with guest singers including Mexican singer Carlos Rivera and Uruguayan musician Jorge Drexler.

== Singles ==
The first single of the album, "Una Vida", was released on December 5, 2019, while the second single, "Veracruz" was released on February 21, 2020.

== Reception ==
Professional ratings
Review scores
Source	Rating
AllMusic	4/5 stars
PopMatters	8/10

Un Canto por México, Vol. 1 has received acclaim from music critics. Thom Jurek from AllMusic gave the album four out of five stars, saying that "while this volume of Un Canto por Mexico is offered as a benefit recording, it is wonderfully representative of Lafourcade's late-2010s work that has focused deeply on Mexico's musical traditions. Highly recommended." Writing for the magazine PopMatters, Marty Lipp rated the album an 8 out of 10, saying that "Un Canto Por México is a true labor of love. Natalia Lafourcade led with her heart and was elegantly guided by her refined musical intelligence". George Varga from The San Diego Union-Tribune placed the album at number nine in his "Best pop albums of 2020" list.

== Track listing ==
All tracks are produced by Kiko Campos.

No.	Title	Writer(s)	Length
1.	"El Balajú / Serenata Huasteca"	Traditional, José Alfredo Jiménez, Natalia Lafourcade	4:28
2.	"Mexicana Hermosa (with Carlos Rivera)"	Natalia Lafourcade, Gustavo Guerrero	4:12
3.	"Veracruz"	Agustín Lara	4:03
4.	"Una Vida"	Natalia Lafourcade	4:21
5.	"Hasta la Raíz (with Los Cojolites and Los Auténticos Decadentes)"	Natalia Lafourcade, Leonel García	4:32
6.	"Ya No Vivo por Vivir (with Leonel García)"	Alberto Aguilera Valadez	6:09
7.	"Mi Religión"	Natalia Lafourcade	3:35
8.	"Para Qué Sufrir (with Jorge Drexler)"	Natalia Lafourcade, Juan Manuel Torreblanca	3:46
9.	"Nunca Es Suficiente"	Natalia Lafourcade, Daniela Azpiasu	4:20
10.	"Sembrando Flores (with Los Cojolites)"	Noé González, Benito Cortés	4:45
11.	"Lo Que Construimos (with Emmanuel del Real)"	Natalia Lafourcade	4:06
12.	"Un Derecho de Nacimiento (with Panteón Rococó)"	Natalia Lafourcade	5:21
13.	"Mi Tierra Veracruzana (with Los Cojolites)"	Natalia Lafourcade	4:11
14.	"Cucurrucucú Paloma"	Tomás Méndez	5:11
Total length:			63:01

== Charts ==
Chart performance for Un Canto por México, Vol. 1
Chart (2020)	Peak position
Spanish Albums (Promusicae)	85
