= Musas, Vol. 2 =

2018 studio album by Natalia Lafourcade and Los Macorinos

Musas: un homenaje al folclore latinoamericano en manos de Los Macorinos, vol. 2

Studio album by Natalia Lafourcade and Los Macorinos
- Released: February 9, 2018
- Genre: Folk
- Length: 56:44
- Language: Spanish
- Label: Sony; RCA
- Producer: Gustavo Guerrero, Cheche Alara

Natalia Lafourcade and Los Macorinos chronology
| Musas, Vol. 1 (2017) | Musas: un homenaje al folclore latinoamericano en manos de Los Macorinos, vol. 2 (2018) | Un Canto por México, Vol. 1 (2020) |

Singles from Musas
- 1. "Danza de Gardenias" Released: January 12, 2018

Musas: Un Homenaje al Folclore Latinoamericano en Manos de Los Macorinos, Vol 2 (English: "Muses: An Homage to Latin American Folklore in the Hands of Los Macorinos, Volume 2"), shortened to Musas, Vol. 2 ("Muses, Vol. 2"), is the seventh studio album by Mexican singer-songwriter Natalia Lafourcade and the second in collaboration with the acoustic guitar duo Los Macorinos. It was released on February 9, 2018.

Musas, Vol. 2 received a Latin Grammy nomination for Album of the Year at the 19th Annual Latin Grammy Awards in 2018. The recording has also garnered a nomination for a Grammy Award for Best Latin Pop Album at the 61st Annual Grammy Awards in 2019.

== Background ==
After the release of Musas and her participation on the animated film Coco, Lafourcade began working on the second part of the project. This album takes most of its structure from the first volume, including the sound and the appearance of original songs and classics from the Latin American music. The album includes the song "Un derecho de nacimiento", a song that was already released in 2012 and was originally written for the movement "Yo Soy 132".

== Singles ==
"Danza de Gardenias" was released as the lead single of the album on January 12, 2018.

== Reception ==
Musas, Vol. 2 received a Latin Grammy nomination for Album of the Year at the 19th Annual Latin Grammy Awards in 2018. The recording has also garnered a nomination for a Grammy Award for Best Latin Pop Album at the 61st Annual Grammy Awards in 2019. Lafourcade performed "La Llorona" at the pre-telecast ceremony with fellow Mexican singers, Ángela Aguilar and Aida Cuevas.

== Track listing ==
All tracks are produced by Gustavo Guerrero and Cheche Alara, except where noted.

Musas, Vol. 2
| No. | Title | Writer(s) | Producer(s) | Length |
|---|---|---|---|---|
| 1. | "Danza de Gardenias (Florecerá)" | Lafourcade, David Aguilar | Kiko Campos | 4:23 |
| 2. | "Alma Mía" | María Grever | | 4:20 |
| 3. | "Hoy Mi Día Uno" | Lafourcade | | 3:25 |
| 4. | "Tus Ojitos (Vals de la Vieja Guardia)" | Traditional | | 2:58 |
| 5. | "Duerme Negrito" | Atahualpa Yupanqui | | 4:44 |
| 6. | "Luz de Luna" | Álvaro Carrillo | | 3:19 |
| 7. | "Un Derecho de Nacimiento" | Lafourcade | | 5:49 |
| 8. | "Eclipse" | Margarita Lecuona | | 5:25 |
| 9. | "La Llorona" | Traditional | | 6:55 |
| 10. | "Desdeñosa (with Eugenia León and Omara Portuondo)" | Benigno Lara Foster | | 4:03 |
| 11. | "Te Sigo" | Augusto Polo Campos | | 3:28 |
| 12. | "Humanidad" | Alberto Domínguez | | 3:48 |
| 13. | "Gavota (Instrumental)" | Manuel Ponce | | 4:07 |
| Total length: | | | | 56:44 |

== Charts ==
=== Weekly charts ===
| Chart (2018) | Peak position |
|---|---|
| Mexican Albums (AMPROFON) | 8 |
| Spain (PROMUSICAE) | 43 |
| US Top Latin Albums (Billboard) | 31 |
| US Latin Pop Albums (Billboard) | 5 |

=== Year-end charts ===
| Chart (2018) | Position |
|---|---|
| Mexican Albums (AMPROFON) | 49 |

== See also ==
- 2018 in Latin music
