= Musas, Vol. 1 =

Musas: Un homenaje al folclore latinoamericano en manos de Los Macorinos, vol. 1

Studio album by Natalia Lafourcade and Los Macorinos
- Released: May 5, 2017
- Genre: Folk
- Length: 45:43
- Language: Spanish
- Labels: Sony Latin; RCA
- Producers: Gustavo Guerrero; Cheche Alara

Natalia Lafourcade and Los Macorinos chronology
Hasta la Raíz (2015)	Musas: Un homenaje al folclore latinoamericano en manos de Los Macorinos, vol. 1 (2017)	Musas, Vol. 2 (2018)

Singles from Musas
- 1. "Tú Sí Sabes Quererme" Released: January 27, 2017; 2. "Soledad y el Mar" Released: January 27, 2017; 3. "Mexicana Hermosa" Released: January 27, 2017

Musas: Un Homenaje al Folclore Latinoamericano en Manos de Los Macorinos, Vol. 1 (transl. Muses: An Homage to Latin American Folklore in the Hands of Los Macorinos, Volume 1), shortened to Musas, Vol. 1 (Muses, Vol. 1), is the sixth studio album by Mexican singer-songwriter Natalia Lafourcade in collaboration with the acoustic guitar duo Los Macorinos. It was released on May 5, 2017, by Sony Music Latin. Musas, Vol. 1 received a Latin Grammy Award nomination for Album of the Year at the 18th Annual Latin Grammy Awards.

== Background ==
According to Lafourcade, the recording of the album started "on a whim" during a vacation in Brazil. During an interview with Billboard, Lafourcade elaborated that her initial plan was not to record a new studio album but "just make music for myself". The album is a homage to Latin American folk music and contains original songs as well as cover versions of other artists' songs. According to Lafourcade, her goal with the album was to explore the history and culture of her Latin American roots. She emphasized that collaborating with Los Macorinos helped her capture the feelings and sounds she wanted to transmit to the audience with Musas, Vol. 1. Describing their work ethic as fastidious, Lafourcade emphasized Los Macorinos's patience and calm attitude while accompanying her instrumentally on every song from the album.

Lafourcade explained her awareness that the majority of the younger Mexican audience that listens to her music may not be familiar with the traditional sounds and artists of the country, but felt that through the songs on Musas, Vol. 1 she was able to contribute to their better acquaintance with their past. Furthermore, the singer elaborated how discovering the songs and artists was an enriching experience for herself as well, further reinforcing her sense of identity to her heritage and history. During an interview with NPR Music she explained: "I wanted the music to sound made in Mexico. I wanted to connect to my roots." In order to fulfill her goal, Lafourcade mixed the traditional music with her contemporary style, creating a new "stronger" musical direction.

Some of the artists to which Lafourcade pays tribute to on the album include Agustín Lara, Margarita Lecuona, Roberto Cantoral and Violeta Parra, the latter being a Chilean artist associated with the song "Qué He Sacado Con Quererte" on the album. For the track "Tu Me Acostumbraste", Buena Vista Social Club lead singer Omara Portuondo serves as a collaborator. In addition to cover versions, two of the album's tracks, namely "Tú Sí Sabes Quererme" and “Rocío de Todos Los Campos” are original songs penned solely by Lafourcade.

== Singles ==
"Tú Sí Sabes Quererme" was released as the album's first single on January 27, 2017.

== Critical reception ==
Professional ratings
Review scores
Source	Rating
Paste	8.2/10
AllMusic	4/5 stars

Paste's Beverly Brian noted how Musas, Vol. 1 was continuing the streak that the singer came forth with in her previous albums where she paid tribute to and drew inspiration from Latin musicians and classics, the majority coming from her home country. He went on to describe the album as "masterfully produced" and added that it contains "exquisite performances", further praising the overall purpose of the album as a preservation of the classics and Lafourcade's usage of them as a source of knowledge and inspiration.

== Track listing ==
Musas, Vol. 1 track listing
No.	Title	Writer(s)	Length
1.	"Tú Sí Sabes Quererme"	Lafourcade	4:05
2.	"Soledad y el Mar"	Lafourcade, David Aguilar	3:35
3.	"Mexicana Hermosa"	Lafourcade, Gustavo Guerrero	3:29
4.	"Qué He Sacado Con Quererte"	Violeta Parra Sandoval	4:25
5.	"Rocío de Todos los Campos"	Lafourcade	4:48
6.	"Mi Tierra Veracruzana"	Lafourcade	3:45
7.	"Te Vi Pasar"	Agustín Lara	2:38
8.	"Son Amores (That's Amore)"	Jack Brooks, Harry Warren	3:44
9.	"Tú Me Acostumbraste" (featuring Omara Portuondo)	Frank Domínguez	3:08
10.	"Soy lo Prohibido"	Roberto Cantoral, Francisco Dino Lopez Ramos	3:43
11.	"Tonada de Luna Llena"	Simón Díaz	4:59
12.	"Vals Poético (Instrumental)"	Juan Carlos Allende, Felipe Villenueva	3:17
Total length:			45:43

== Charts ==
=== Weekly charts ===
Weekly chart performance for Musas, Vol. 1
Chart (2017)	Peak position
Mexican Albums (AMPROFON)	3
Spanish Albums (Promusicae)	97
US Top Latin Albums (Billboard)	30
US Latin Pop Albums (Billboard)	9

=== Year-end charts ===
2017 year-end chart performance for Musas, Vol. 1
Chart (2017)	Position
Mexican Albums (AMPROFON)	19

2018 year-end chart performance for Musas, Vol. 1
Chart (2018)	Position
Mexican Albums (AMPROFON)	63

== Certifications ==
Certifications for Musas, Vol. 1
Region	Certification	Certified units/sales
Mexico (AMPROFON)	2× Platinum+Gold	150,000^{‡}
^{‡} Sales+streaming figures based on certification alone.

== Release history ==
Release dates and formats for Musas, Vol. 1
Region	Date	Format	Ref.
Mexico	May 5, 2017	Digital download	

== See also ==
- 2017 in Latin music
