= Natalia Lafourcade =

Mexican singer-songwriter (born 1984)

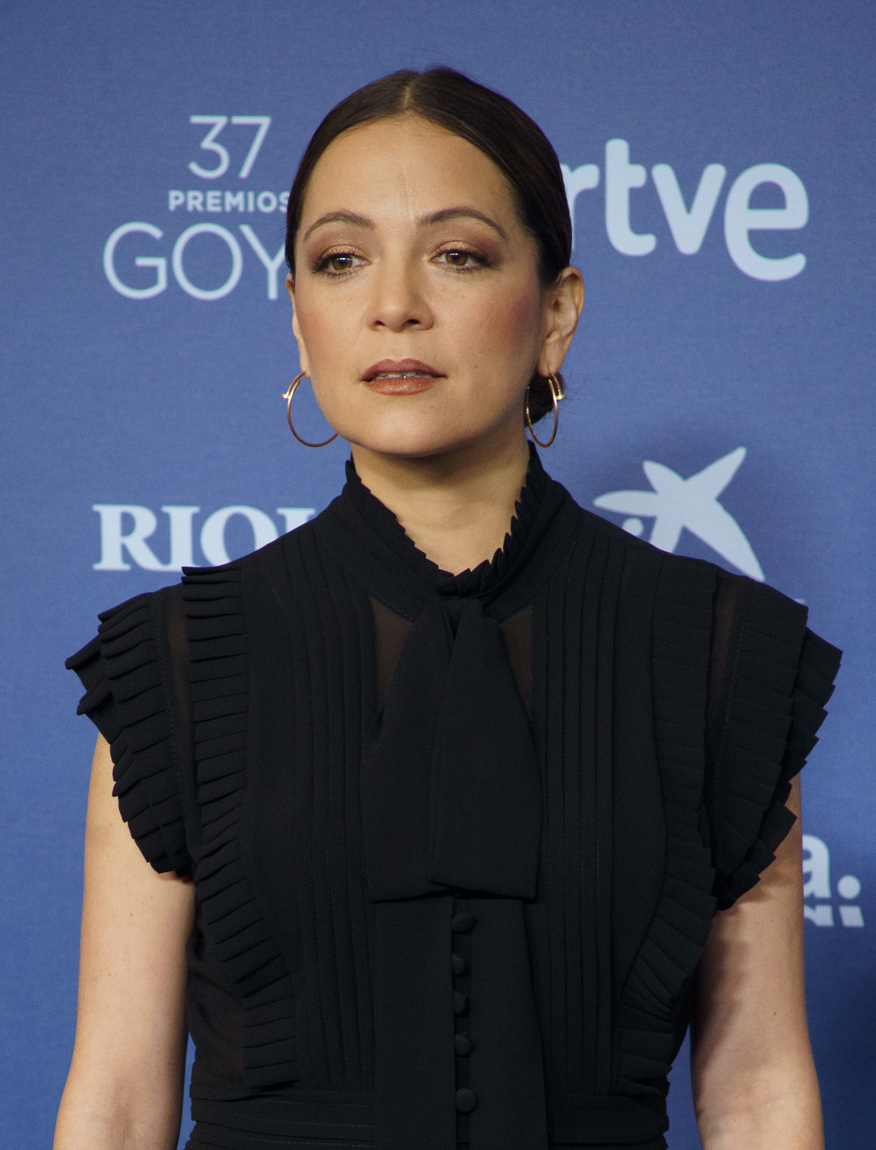
- Lafourcade in 2023
- Born: María Natalia Lafourcade Silva; 26 February 1984 (age 42); Mexico City, Mexico
- Occupations: Singer-songwriter; musician; record producer
- Years active: 1998–present
- Children: 1
- Father: Gastón Lafourcade
- Relatives: Enrique Lafourcade (uncle)
- Musical career
- Origin: Coatepec, Veracruz, Mexico
- Genres: Pop rock; Latin rock; folk; bossa nova; alternative pop; jazz; cumbia
- Instruments: Vocals; guitar; piano
- Label: Sony Mexico
- Website: natalialafourcade.com.mx

María Natalia Lafourcade Silva (Spanish pronunciation: [maˈɾi.a naˈtalja lafuɾˈkade ˈsilba]; born 26 February 1984) is a Mexican singer-songwriter. Her music combines elements of pop rock, jazz, and folk, characterized by poetic Spanish lyrics and a lyric soprano voice. She is regarded among the most influential female Latin music artists of all time.

At age 14, Lafourcade briefly joined Twist, a short-lived girl group that disbanded in 1999. She later pursued a solo career, recording several demos before releasing her self-titled debut album, Natalia Lafourcade (2002). The album and its breakthrough single, "En el 2000", brought her widespread recognition. Her follow-up record, Casa (2005), credited as Natalia y La Forquetina, reflected alternative rock influences. After a brief hiatus from performing, Lafourcade returned with the pop-oriented Hu Hu Hu (2009), which included the single "Ella es Bonita". She experimented toward traditional music with Mujer Divina – Homenaje a Agustín Lara (2012), a tribute album to the renowned Mexican composer. Her fifth studio album, Hasta la Raíz (2015), earned critical acclaim and commercial success, particularly for its title track and the single "Nunca Es Suficiente".

Lafourcade further explored folk and regional sounds in the Musas duology—Vol. 1 (2017) and Vol. 2 (2018)—and later celebrated bolero and son jarocho with Un Canto por México, Vol. 1 (2020) and Vol. 2 (2021). She incorporated elements of Latin jazz on De Todas las Flores (2022) and continued that exploration with Cancionera (2025). Her accolades include 20 Latin Grammy Awards, the most by any female artist, five Grammy Awards, and a Billboard Latin Music Award.

== Early life ==
María Natalia Lafourcade Silva was born on 26 February 1984 in Mexico City, but grew up in Coatepec, Veracruz. Her father is the Chilean musician Gastón Lafourcade, and her mother is the pianist María del Carmen Silva Contreras. Her uncle was Chilean writer Enrique Lafourcade, a representative of the so-called "Generation of the '50s".

During her childhood, during her youth, Lafourcade grew up watching Hollywood actors from the 1990s, such as Robert Englund, Bruce Willis, Heather Langenkamp, and Miko Hughes. Lafourcade studied music with her mother, imitating artists such as Gloria Trevi and Garibaldi. She would be influenced by Fiona Apple, Björk and Café Tacvba as well as Ely Guerra and Julieta Venegas. Her mother studied piano with a specialty in musical pedagogy and is the creator of the Macarsi Method for musical training and personal development for children and educators. She adapted and practiced the method with Lafourcade to help her rehabilitate through music, following a head injury from being kicked by a horse.

She attended Instituto Anglo Español, a Catholic middle school, and studied painting, flute, theater, music, acting, piano, guitar, saxophone, and singing. When she was 10, Lafourcade sang in a mariachi group.

== Career ==
=== 1998–2000: Early years and Twist ===
In 1998, Lafourcade joined a pop music group called Twist. The members included Lafourcade, Tabatha Vizuet (former member of the group Jeans), and Ana Pamela Garcés (former host of a children's television program on TV Azteca). The group was unsuccessful and they split up the following year. Lafourcade has stated that one of the things she disliked about being in Twist, and a reason she began to look for alternatives, was having to lip sync (mime) when performing.

After finishing high school, Lafourcade enrolled at Academia de Música Fermatta, where she met Ximena Sariñana, Juan Manuel Torreblanca, and Alonso Cortés, who would eventually be the drummer for La Forquetina years later.

In 2000, producer Loris Ceroni listened to the demos he had received from Lafourcade and, when she was 17, he gave Lafourcade the opportunity to be in a pop/rock group under his guidance. Lafourcade was hesitant, and Ceroni instead encouraged her to become independent. Lafourcade produced her first LP under the Sony Music label. It was recorded in Italy and was cowritten with Áureo Baqueiro. She performed in the city of Dolores Hidalgo, in a concert at the Colegio Lic. Álvaro de Osio y Ocampo, granting her recognition across the country.

=== 2002–2004: Natalia Lafourcade and first hits ===
In June 2002, Lafourcade released her debut studio album, self-titled Natalia Lafourcade, a mix of pop, rock, bossa nova and Latin rhythms. The singles on the album were "Busca un Problema", her biggest hit "En el 2000", "Te Quiero Dar", and "Mírame, Mírate". During this time, she was also the principal contributor to the soundtrack for the Mexican movie Amar te duele, recording the main theme "Amarte Duele", the acoustic version of the song, as well as adding three songs from her first album to the soundtrack: "Busca un Problema", "En el 2000", and "El Destino". She also recorded a duet with León Larregui, "Llevarte a Marte", and contributed the song "Un Pato" for the movie Temporada de patos.

In 2004, she was nominated for a Latin Grammy in the Best New Artist category for her debut album, and was nominated for Rock New Artist at the 16th Lo Nuestro Awards, losing to fellow Mexican singer Alessandra Rosaldo.

At the end of the tour for her first album, Natalia Lafourcade stopped performing as a soloist and began to perform with her band—Alonso Cortés, César Chanona, and Yunuén Viveros—as Natalia y la Forquetina.

=== 2005–2007: La Forquetina and Casa ===
In 2005, she released Casa, her second album, but this time as Natalia y La Forquetina, the name of her band. Produced mostly by Café Tacuba's Emmanuel del Real, Casa presents a more mature, rock-oriented sound while retaining pop and bossa-nova influences on a few tracks, such as lead single "Ser Humano" (pop-rock) and its follow-up "Casa" (pop-bossa-nova). Áureo Baqueiro returned to produce the few tracks not produced by del Real.

On 2 June 2006, after a tour through Mexico and parts of the U.S., Lafourcade announced she would leave La Forquetina to once again work as a solo artist. Natalia y la Forquetina's final show was on 18 August 2006 in San Luis Potosí. Following the group's break-up, Casa won the Latin Grammy for Best Rock Album by a Duo or Group with Vocal in September.

Also in 2006, a documentary about the band, showing the group on the road and their travels, was aired on MTV Tr3s in the fall of 2007.

Natalia Lafourcade has also appeared on other songs with various other artists. These include Liquits' "Jardin", Kalimba's "Dia de Suerte", Control Machete's "El Apostador", and Reik's rendition of Lafourcade's song "Amarte Duele". She also reappeared with her former band on various compilation disks with previously unreleased tracks such as "Y Todo Para Que" on Intocable's X, and on the Tin Tan tribute album, Viva Tin Tan, with the hit "Piel Canela". In 2011, she made "Quisiera Saber", a music video with Los Daniels.

==== 2007: Las 4 Estaciones del Amor ====
Natalia Lafourcade moved to Canada, where she met the band People Project, with whom she still frequently collaborates.

Lafourcade returned to Mexico and began to work on Las 4 Estaciones del Amor, her first instrumental album, in collaboration with the Orquesta Sinfónica Juvenil del Estado de Veracruz (OSJEV). The album, under the Sony BMG label, also included a DVD where she narrated the process of making an instrumental album. She also wrote the lyrics for "Tú y Yo" from Ximena Sariñana's self-titled album.

=== 2008–2011: Hu Hu Hu and collaborations ===
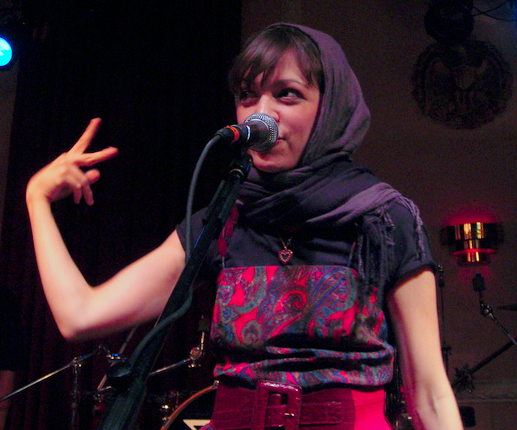
Lafourcade in 2009

In 2008, she performed on Julieta Venegas' MTV Unplugged album and DVD, where she played several instruments including the bass. She was also a participant in the Red Bull Music Academy in its 2008 edition, held in Barcelona, Spain. In the same year, she began to record her fourth album, and held a concert at the Teatro Metropólitan with Juan Son, Porter's ex-vocalist.

From 2008, Lafourcade had been planning her next album, which she started on at the beginning of 2009. In May 2009, she released the album HU HU HU, a top 10 album in Mexico. The album was produced by Emmanuel del Real (who produced Casa in 2005), Marco Moreno, and Ernesto García. It features internationally known rock and pop artists, such as Julieta Venegas and Juan Son. The first alternative single that she proposed was the song "Azul"; however, the label released the single "Ella es Bonita" simultaneously on the radio and in the press. The album was recommended during the summer of 2009. Lafourcade embarked on various projects. The influence of her stay in Canada and her previous album, Las 4 Estaciones del Amor, is noticeable in this album. In December 2009, HU HU HU had its official presentation at the Teatro Fru Fru, in Mexico City, where it had guests such as Denise Gutiérrez of Hello Seahorse!, Furland, and Carla Morrison. It was nominated for Best Female Pop Vocal Album at the 2009 Latin Grammy Awards (won by Laura Pausini) and Best Latin Pop album at the 2010 Grammy Awards (won by La Quinta Estación). Club Fonograma also named the album the second best of 2009, and the seventh best of the decade.

She joined the non-profit project Un Techo para mi País, which aims to promote community development through the construction of temporary housing for low-income people and other social empowerment projects. She voice-acted for the role of the princess in the Spanish version of the animated film The True History of Puss 'N Boots, a French production distributed by MK2 Diffusion. There she shared credits with Kalimba and Juan José Origel.

2010 was the year of collaborations for Natalia. She recorded the song "Contigo" with the Spanish band El Canto del Loco, and the song "Quisiera Saber" with the Mexican group Los Daniels. Together with Manolo García, she performed the duet "Pájaros de Barro" and "Cursis Melodías" for Lunas del Auditorio Nacional in Mexico City. In 2011, Lafourcade won the Best New Producer of the Year award in the Indie-O Music Awards, for her work with Carla Morrison's Mientras Tú Dormías... album, and a Telehit Award.

In the same year, she went on tour again, in Japan, and did so on a more instrumental plane, in which her musical and artistic growth was noted. This is how she made the documentary 14 Días en Japón, which was included in the HU HU HU reissue.

HU HU HU's tour spanned South America, Europe, the United States, Mexico, and Japan, and ended with a successful presentation at the Vive Latino 2011 Festival Iberoamericano de Cultura Musical, thus achieving a reconciliation with this audience after her unfortunate reception at the presentation in 2003. In 2012, she performed an ensemble with the Banda de Música del Estado de Oaxaca, offering a concert in the Plaza de la Danza in Oaxaca City, where she performed traditional Oaxacan songs, boleros, as well as songs from her repertoire.

=== 2012–2014: Mujer Divina ===
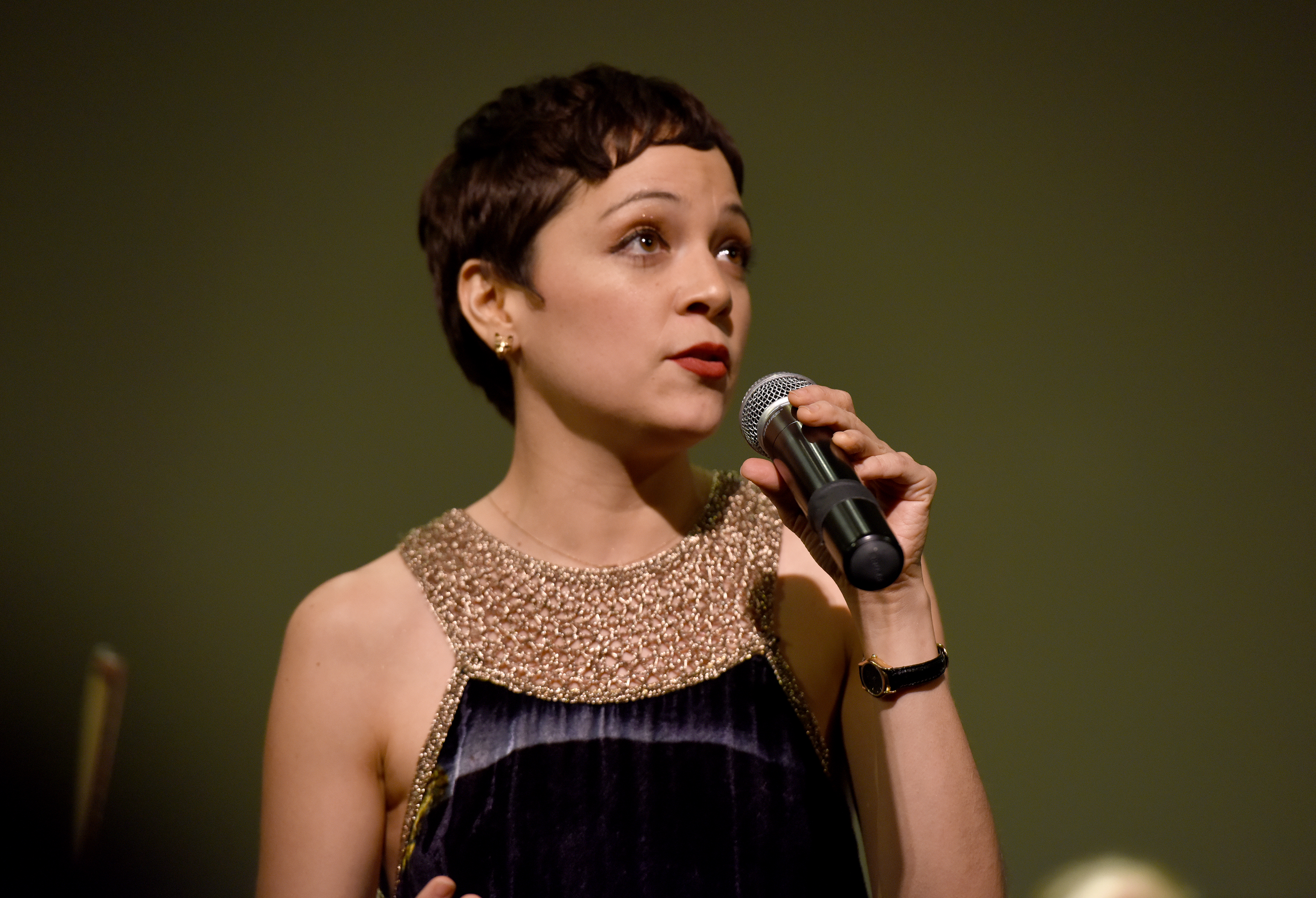
Lafourcade in 2014

Her album Mujer Divina – Homenaje a Agustín Lara was released 18 September 2012. For this production, Natalia was accompanied by guest musicians, with whom she reinterprets the classic songs of Lara, to be compiled on a double disc containing a DVD, recorded in the forums of her record company.

Among the guests on this album are Miguel Bosé, Leonardo de Lozanne, Gilberto Gil, the Uruguayan singer-songwriter Jorge Drexler, Café Tacvba's Emmanuel del Real, Lila Downs, the Venezuelan-American musician Devendra Banhart, the group DLD, and Kevin Johansen, the latter who participates in the song "Fugitiva", the production's first single released in digital download. With the song "Azul", featuring Rodrigo Amarante, she contributed to the soundtrack of the Mexican film Güeros.

For this album, Lafourcade obtained, in December 2013, a platinum and gold record for having over 94,000 sales.

=== 2015–2017: Hasta la Raíz ===
Her next album, Hasta la Raíz, was released in March 2015. "Nunca Es Suficiente", the first single off the album, was released on 10 February. The track "Hasta la Raíz" was No. 5 of the Viral 50 Global Spotify Chart and No. 1 on the Viral 50 México chart. It is with this album that, in the sixteenth version of the Latin Grammys, it won the awards for "Song of the Year", "Best Alternative Song", and "Record of the Year" for "Hasta la Raíz", and "Best Alternative Music Album" and "Best Engineered Album".

She performed on the NPR Music Tiny Desk series on 27 October 2017. In the video's first month on YouTube, it was viewed more than 1,350,000 times. As of 25 February 2024, that same video has been viewed over 30,407,169 times.

=== 2017–2018: Musas, Vol. 1, Vol. 2 and hiatus ===
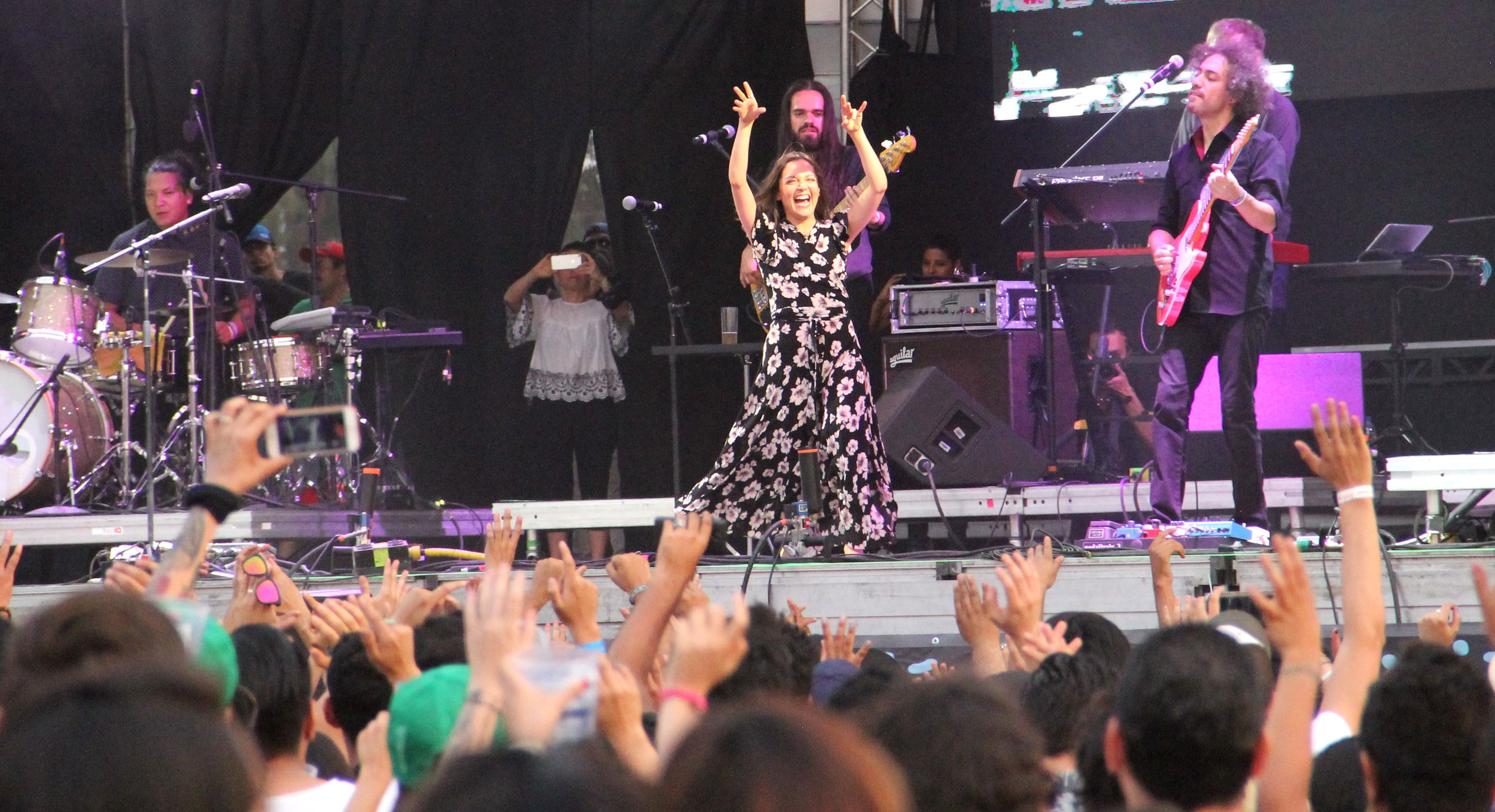
Natalia Lafourcade at the Corona Revolution Fest 2017

On 5 May 2017, Natalia Lafourcade presented her new album, Musas, Vol. 1, accompanied by Los Macorinos, old-school musicians who previously worked with artists like Chavela Vargas. The album's first single, "Tú Sí Sabes Quererme", reached 22 million streams on Spotify in the first two months of its release. In this album, Lafourcade takes up the trend that began in Hasta la Raíz of paying homage to the authors who have influenced her musical career. The album was certified gold in Mexico for exceeding 30,000 sales.

From 19 to 30 August, she toured Argentina, called the "Tú Sí Sabes Argentina" tour, with overwhelming success: Córdoba, Rosario, Buenos Aires, La Plata, Mar del Plata, and Mendoza were witness scenes of a walk through the music of Mexico and other regions in the Americas. On this occasion, the stages that received her were strongly attended, including two sold-out presentations at La Trastienda Club and the famous "Ballena Azul" concert hall at the CCK Centro Cultural Néstor Kirchner, which left a large number of fans outside since tickets were sold out in fifteen minutes.

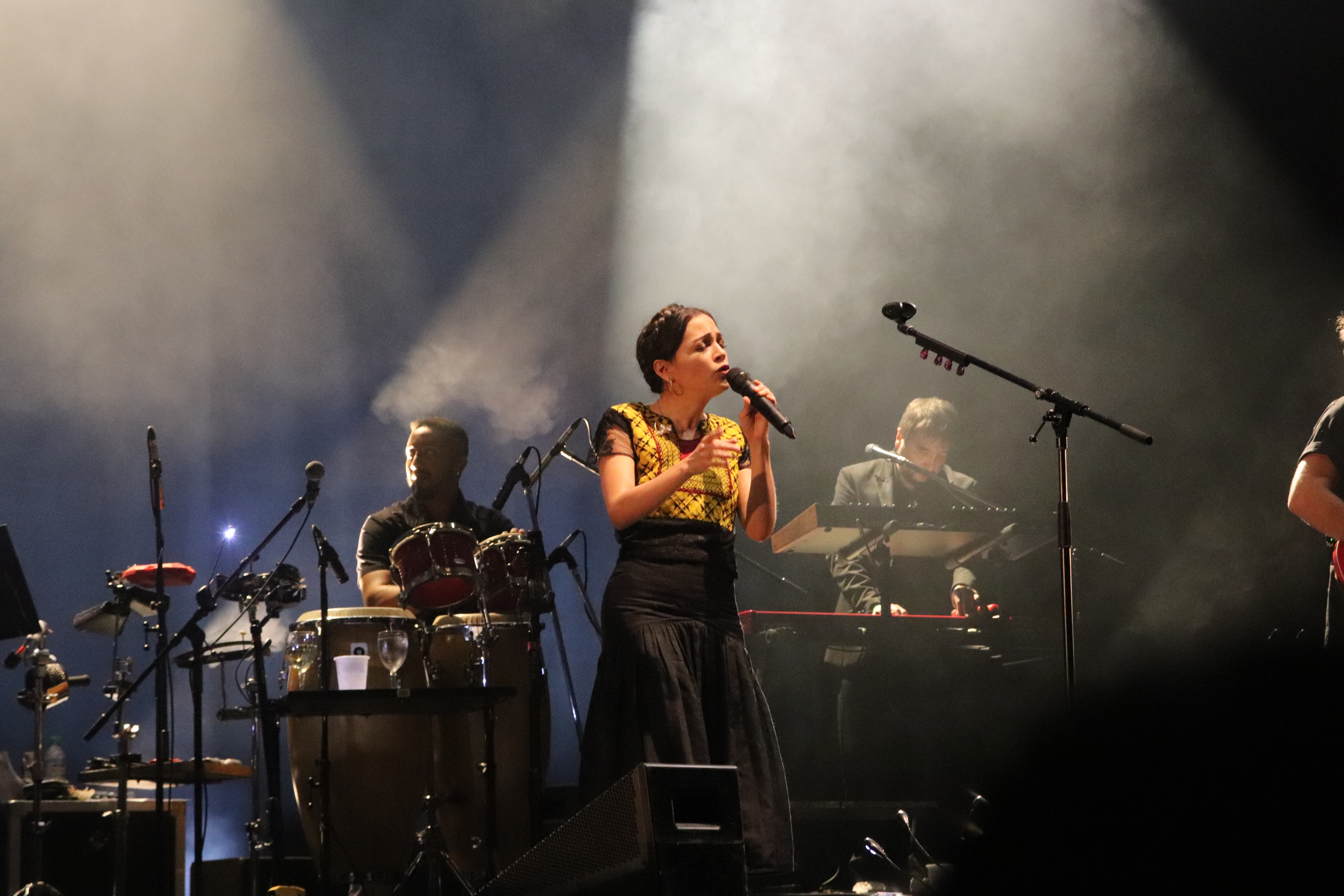
Lafourcade in 2018

At the end of 2017, Lafourcade participated in the original music for Disney-Pixar's film Coco, playing two versions of the song, "Recuérdame" in Spanish and "Remember Me" in English. For the Mexican and Latin American version, she interpreted a solo version that did not appear in the film, but was included on the album. The final version was that of Carlos Rivera. In the U.S. version, Lafourcade interprets the song together with American musician Miguel, being the main theme. This version won the Oscar for Best Original Song.

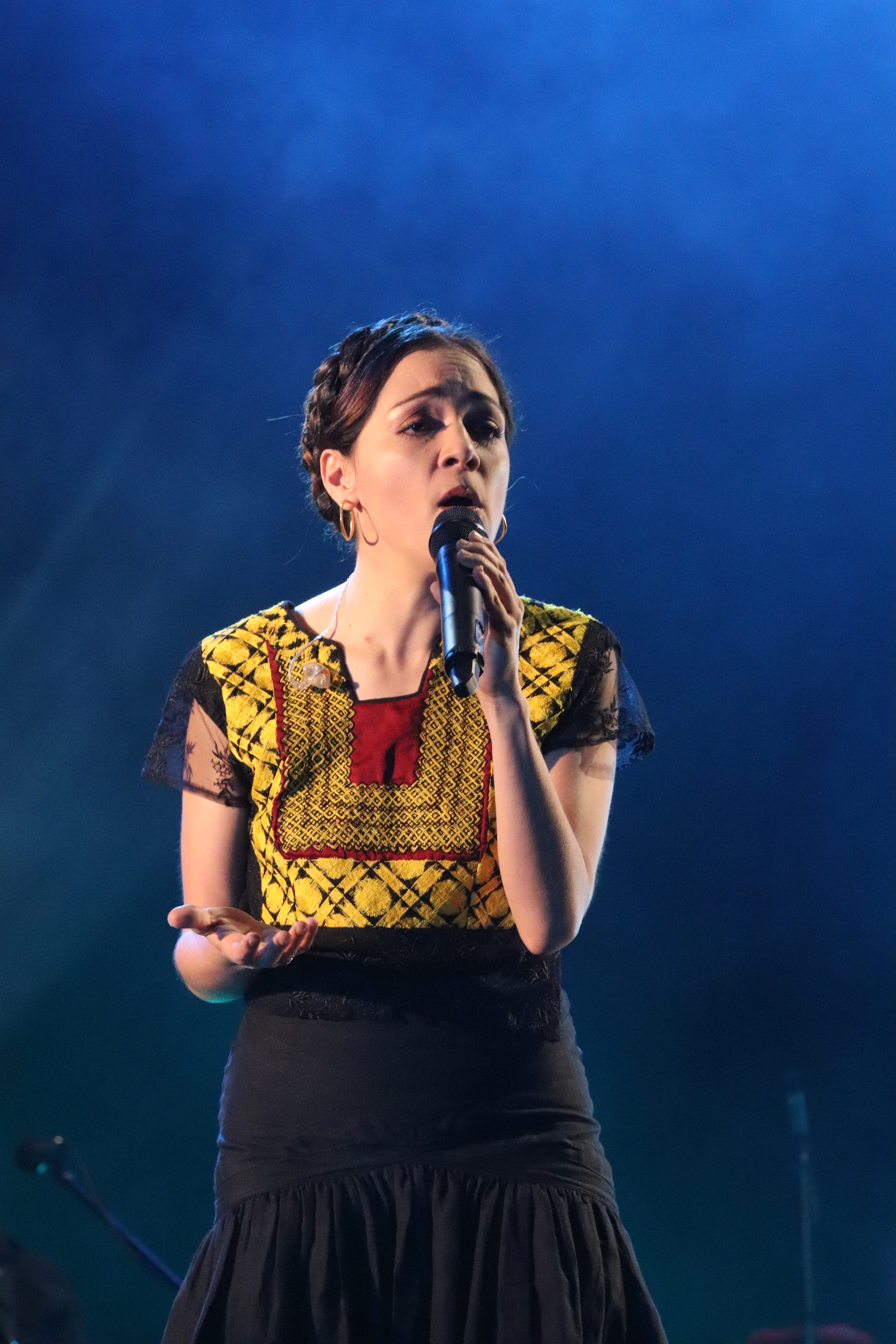
Lafourcade in 2018

In February 2018, she released the album Musas, Vol. 2, which includes songs she personally composed, such as "Danza de Gardenias", "Hoy Mi Día Uno", and the rerelease of the protest song "Un Derecho de Nacimiento". Also included are songs by great Latin American composers, such as Álvaro Carrillo, Augusto Polo Campos, and María Grever. After the release of Musas, Volumen 2, she toured Europe, performing at the KOKO Theater in London, at the Bataclan in Paris, at the Sala Apolo in Barcelona, and in the cities of Madrid and Ferrol. After the European tour, Natalia Lafourcade appeared on the stage of the 90th Academy Awards together with Gael García Bernal and Miguel, due to the nomination of "Remember Me". The song was chosen as the winner. In mid-April 2018, she announced that she would continue with the "Musas Tour", with two concerts at the Teatro Gran Rex in Chile, Canada, and the United States, and finish the tour in Mexico. After this, she announced that she would be taking a break from her musical career.

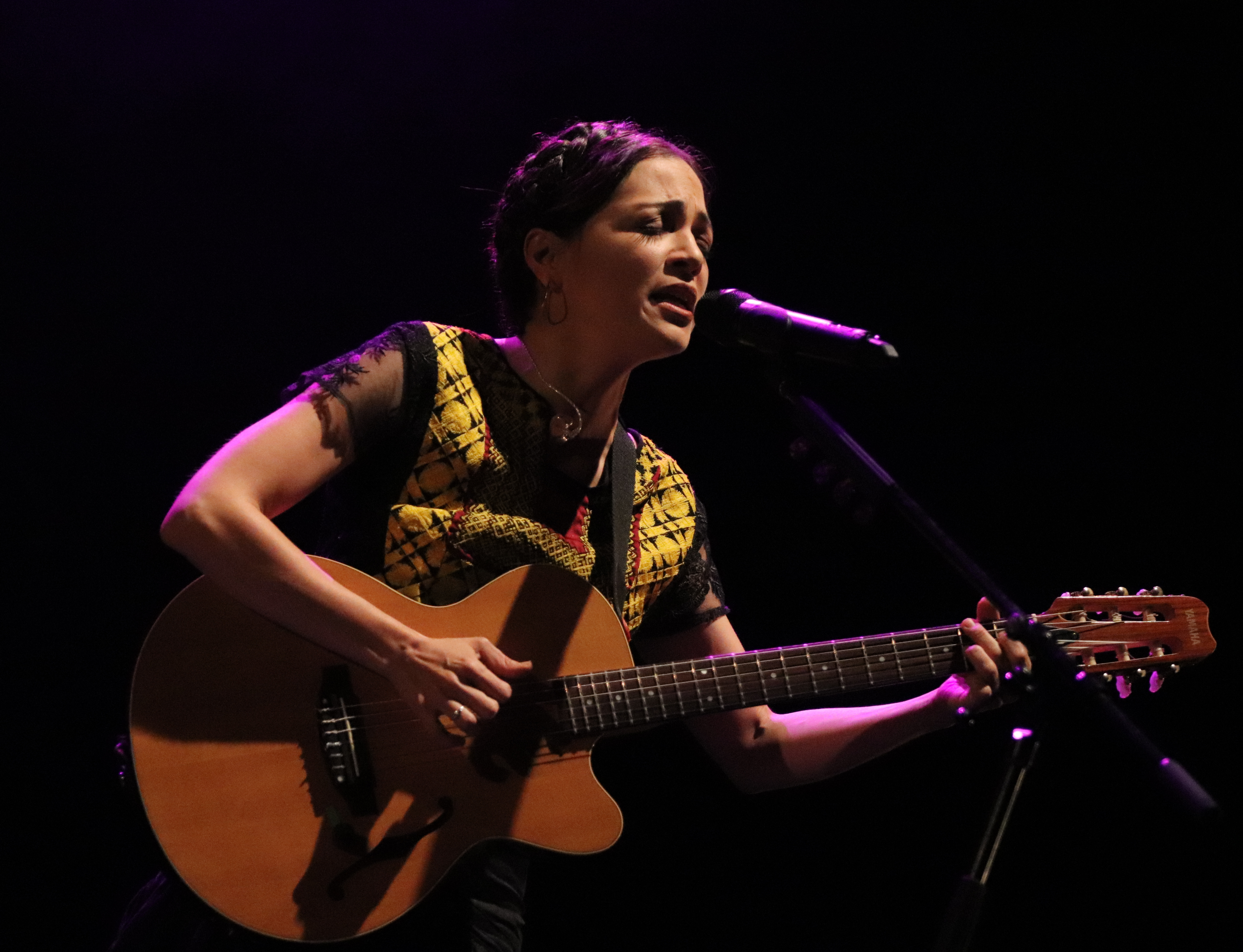
2018 at Gran Rex

After concluding the Musas tour, she announced that she would dedicate her time away from the stage to the reconstruction efforts of the Son Jarocho Documentation Center that was damaged after the earthquakes in Mexico in 2017. She occasionally left her break to perform at the Grammys and Latin Grammys' ceremonies.

=== 2019–2021: Un Canto por México ===
As the first step for new record material, Lafourcade held press conferences from 30 September 2019 to 5 December 2019, and the music video for her single "Una vida" was published on YouTube. On 8 May 2020, Lafourcade officially launched Un canto por México, an album with a cause, since the proceeds from it were allocated to the reconstruction of the Centro de Documentación del Son Jarocho, located in the city of Jáltipan de Morelos, Veracruz, which was affected by the 2017 Puebla earthquake. Likewise, this album houses a series of collaborations by artists such as Carlos Rivera, Los Auténticos Decadentes, Jorge Drexler, Emmanuel del Real, Panteón Rococó, and Los Cojolites, a group from Son Jarocho. Un canto por México is inspired by Luis Miguel's studio album ¡México Por Siempre!.

In Lafourcade's words, the album "tastes like mole" and contains melodies from past albums as new versions, such as "Hasta la raíz" in the style of Son Jarocho in the company of Los Cojolites and Los Auténticos Decadentes. Other songs included are "Mexicana hermosa" in a mariachi version with Carlos Rivera, "Un derecho de nacimiento", "Ya no vivo por vivir", "Nunca es suficiente", "Lo que construimos", "Mi tierra veracruzana", and "Cucurrucucú paloma", among others. The video clip for the single "Mi religión" was released on 7 May 2020, and was recorded on the streets of Guanajuato and San Miguel de Allende. The song focuses on Lafourcade's love of music.

On 28 May 2021, Lafourcade officially released the second part of what turned out to be a two-part series, Un canto por México, vol. 2. The profits were also donated towards the reconstruction of the cultural center of Veracruz.

=== 2022–2024: De Todas las Flores and Live at Carnegie Hall ===
After traveling to Hacienda San Lorenzo in Parras, Coahuila (the oldest winery in Mexico), Lafourcade was inspired to collaborate with poet Citlali Aguilera Lira to produce the single "Tierra querida." The song was released on June 17, 2022.

On October 28, 2022, Lafourcade released her first album in seven years to be composed entirely of original songs, De Todas las Flores. She premiered the album at Carnegie Hall on October 27, 2022. The album was produced by Franco-Mexican producer, Adán Jodorowsky, with musicians including guitarist Marc Ribot, bass player Sebastian Steinberg and drummer Cyril Atef. In 2019 and for a second time in September 2024, Lafourcade performed at the 18,000-capacity Hollywood Bowl with Gustavo Dudamel and the Los Angeles Philharmonic.

=== 2025: Cancionera ===
Lafourcade released her 12th studio album, Cancionera, on 24 April 2025. The album was met with international critical acclaim for its introspective lyrics, symbolism to Mexican folk culture, and Lafourade's collaboration with several notable Latin American artists during the album's production. It was recorded live on analogue tape with 18 musicians and Lafourcade recording the songs in one take. The album was produced by Adán Jodorowsky who previously worked on her album, De Todas las Flores. The album's songs were heavily influenced by Lafourcade turning 40 and the golden age of Mexican cinema during the 1930s to the 1950s. Lafourcade performed throughout North America, marking her most extensive tour since 2018.

== Personal life ==
Lafourcade lives in Coatepec, Veracruz, in the family home she grew up visiting as a child. She began singing in public at age 10. At the suggestion of a mariachi singer who commented on her lack of proper vocal technique, she sought voice lessons as a child with the goal of appearing on television. She announced on social media that she and her husband, whom she married in 2021, had gone on their honeymoon after two years of marriage but did not disclose her husband's name nor their wedding date. She enjoys painting in her spare time.

Lafourcade has two half-sisters named Katherine and Andrea, whom she reportedly did not meet until she was an adult. The song "Que te vaya bonito, Nicolás", from her studio album De todas las flores, is dedicated in memory of her nephew, Nicolás, who died in 2021 in an accident on a mountain. In July 2025, Lafourcade announced that she was expecting her first child, while still touring through Europe. On 23 December 2025, she announced the birth of her son.

== Discography ==
=== Studio albums ===
List of studio albums, with selected details, chart positions
Title	Album details	Peak chart positions				Certifications
Title	Album details	MEX	US Latin	US Latin Pop	SPA	Certifications
Natalia Lafourcade	Release date: July 8, 2002; Label: Sony Mexico; Format: CD, digital download	1	–	–	–	AMPROFON: Platinum
Casa	Release date: September 1, 2005; Label: Sony Mexico; Format: CD, digital download	1	–	–	–	AMPROFON: Gold
Hu Hu Hu	Release date: May 29, 2009; Label: Sony Mexico; Format: CD, digital download, vinyl	9	–	–	–	
Mujer Divina – Homenaje a Agustín Lara	Release date: September 18, 2012; Label: Sony Mexico; Format: CD, digital download, streaming	3	–	–	–	AMPROFON: 3× Platinum
Hasta la Raíz	Release date: March 17, 2015; Label: Sony Mexico, RCA; Format: CD, digital download, streaming, vinyl	1	8	4	73	AMPROFON: Diamond+Platinum; RIAA: 2× Platinum (Latin); FIMI: Gold
Musas: Un Homenaje al Folclore Latinoamericano en Manos de Los Macorinos, Vol 1	Release date: May 5, 2017; Label: Sony Mexico, RCA; Format: CD, digital download, streaming vinyl	3	30	9	97	AMPROFON: 2× Platinum
Musas: Un Homenaje al Folclore Latinoamericano en Manos de Los Macorinos, Vol 2	Release date: February 9, 2018; Label: Sony Mexico, RCA; Format: CD, digital download, streaming, vinyl	8	31	5	43	
Un Canto por México, Vol. 1	Release date: February 8, 2020; Label: Sony Mexico, RCA; Format: CD, digital download, streaming	–	–	–	85	
Un Canto por México, Vol. 2	Release date: May 28, 2021; Label: Sony Mexico, RCA; Format: CD, digital download, streaming, vinyl	–	–	–	–	
De Todas las Flores	Release date: October 28, 2022; Label: Sony Mexico, RCA; Format: CD, digital download, streaming, vinyl	–	–	–	94	
Cancionera	Release date: April 24, 2025; Label: Sony Mexico, RCA; Format: CD, digital download, streaming, vinyl	–	–	–	–	

=== Extended plays ===
List of extended plays, with selected details
Title	Album details
Las 4 Estaciones del Amor	Release date: January 22, 2008; Label: Sony Mexico; Format: CD, digital download

=== Singles ===
==== As lead artists ====
List of singles as lead artist, with selected chart positions and certifications, showing year released and album name
Title	Year	Peak chart positions		Certifications	Album
Title	Year	MEX	US Latin	Certifications	Album
"Busca un Problema"	2002	–	–		Natalia Lafourcade
"En el 2000"	2002	–	–		Natalia Lafourcade
"Te Quiero Dar"	2002	–	–		Natalia Lafourcade
"Mirame, Mirate"	2002	–	34		Natalia Lafourcade
"Elefantes"	2002	–	–		Natalia Lafourcade
"Ser Humano"	2005	–	–		Casa
"Casa"	2005	–	–		Casa
"O pato (El Pato)"	2006	–	–		Casa
"Solamente te lo Doy a Ti"	2006	–	–		Casa
"Azul"	2009	–	–		Hu Hu Hu
"Ella Es Bonita"	2009	4	–		Hu Hu Hu
"Cursis Melodias"	2009	–	–		Hu Hu Hu
"No Viniste"	2010	–	–		Hu Hu Hu
"La Fugitiva" (with Kevin Johansen)	2012	–	–		Mujer Divina
"Limosna" (with Emmanuel del Real)	2013	–	–		Mujer Divina
"Mujer Divina" (with Adrián Dárgelos)	2013	–	–		Mujer Divina
"Aventurera" (with Alex Ferreira)	2013	–	–		Mujer Divina
"Nunca Es Suficiente" (solo or with Los Ángeles Azules)	2015	7	7	AMPROFON: Diamond+2× Platinum+Gold	Hasta la Raíz
"Hasta la Raíz"	2015	27	–	AMPROFON: 3× Diamond+4× Platinum; RIAA: Diamond (Latin)	Hasta la Raíz
"Lo Que Construimos"	2015	–	–	AMPROFON: 3× Platinum	Hasta la Raíz
"Mi Lugar Favorito"	2015	19	–	AMPROFON: Gold	Hasta la Raíz
"Tú Sí Sabes Quererme" (with Los Macorinos)	2017	–	–	AMPROFON: Diamond	Musas, Vol. 1
"Soledad y el Mar" (with Los Macorinos)	2017	–	–	AMPROFON: Platinum	Musas, Vol. 1
"Mexicana Hermosa" (with Carlos Rivera)	2017	–	–	AMPROFON: Gold	Musas, Vol. 1
"Danza de Gardenias"	2018	34	–		Musas, Vol. 2
"Alma Mía"	2018	–	–		Musas, Vol. 2
"Desdeñosa" (with Eugenia León and Omara Portuondo)	2018	–	–		Musas, Vol. 2
"Que la Vida Vale"	2018	–	–		—N/a
"Una Vida"	2020	–	–		Un Canto por México, Vol. 1
"Veracruz"	2020	–	–		Un Canto por México, Vol. 1
"El Balajú / Serenata Huasteca"	2020	–	–		Un Canto por México, Vol. 1
"Alfonsina y El Mar"	2021	–	–		—N/a
"Cien Años"	2021	–	–		Un Canto por México, Vol. 2
"Tú Sí Sabes Quererme"	2021	31	–		Un Canto por México, Vol. 2
"Nada es Verdad"	2021	–	–		Un Canto por México, Vol. 2
"Tierra Querida"	2022	–	–		—N/a
"De Todas las Flores"	2022	–	–		De Todas las Flores
"Mi Manera de Querer"	2022	–	–		De Todas las Flores

==== As featured artist ====
List of singles as featured artist, with selected chart positions and certifications, showing year released and album name
Title	Year	Peak chart positions				Certifications	Album
Title	Year	MEX	US Latin	SPA	ARG	Certifications	Album
"Quisiera Saber" (with Los Daniels)	2010	24	–	–	–	AMPROFON: Gold	A Casa
"María" (with La Oreja de Van Gogh)	2013	–	–	26	–		Primera Fila: La Oreja de Van Gogh
"Gulliver" (with Miguel Bosé, Alex González and Sergio Vallín)	2016	37	–	–	–		Bosé: MTV Unplugged
"Golpes en el Corazón" (with Los Auténticos Decadentes)	2021	–	–	–	36		Capítulo A
"Thunderdome [W.T.A.]" (with Portugal. The Man and Black Thought)	2023	–	–	–	–		Chris Black Changed My Life
"Hermano" (with Santana)	2026	–	–	–	–		Hermano

==== Other certified songs ====
Title	Year	Certifications	Album
"Remember Me (Duo)" (with Miguel)	2017	RIAA: Gold	Coco

== Awards and nominations ==
Award	Year	Category	Recipient(s) and nominee(s)	Result	Ref.
Billboard Latin Music Awards	2020	Regional Mexican Song of the Year	"Nunca Es Suficiente" (with Los Ángeles Azules)	Won	
Grammy Awards	2004	Best Latin Pop Album	Natalia Lafourcade	Nominated	
Grammy Awards	2010	Best Latin Pop Album	Hu Hu Hu	Nominated	
Grammy Awards	2016	Best Latin Rock, Urban or Alternative Album	Hasta la Raíz	Won	
Grammy Awards	2018	Best Latin Pop Album	Musas, Vol. 1	Nominated	
Grammy Awards	2019	Best Latin Pop Album	Musas, Vol. 2	Nominated	
Grammy Awards	2021	Best Regional Mexican Music Album (including Tejano)	Un Canto por México, Vol. 1	Won	
Grammy Awards	2022	Best Regional Mexican Music Album (including Tejano)	Un Canto por México, Vol. 2	Nominated	
Grammy Awards	2023	Best Regional Mexican Music Album (including Tejano)	Un Canto por México - El Musical	Won	
Grammy Awards	2024	Best Latin Rock or Alternative Album	De Todas las Flores	Won* (TIE)	
Grammy Awards	2026	Best Latin Pop Album	Cancionera	Won	
Latin American Music Awards	2019	Favorite Female Artist	Herself	Nominated	
Latin American Music Awards	2019	Favorite Regional Mexican Song	"Nunca es Suficiente" (with Los Ángeles Azules)	Nominated	
Latin Grammy Awards (Note: Four albums by Lafourcade have been nominated for Best Engineered Album, the nominations for this category only goes to the engineers of the album and not to the performing artist.: In 2013, Mujer Divina – Homenaje a Agustín Lara was nominated for the category, Carlos Campón, Ernesto García, Noah Georgeson, Demian Nava, Sebastían Schon, César Sogbe and José Blanco received the nomination.; In 2015, Hasta la Raíz won the category, Andrés Borda, Eduardo Del Águila, Alan Ortiz Grande, Demián Nava, Alan Saucedo, Sebastián Schon, Eduardo Del Águila, Cesar Sogbe and José Blanco received the award.; In 2021, Un Canto por México, Vol. 2 was nominated for the category, Pepe Aguilar, Rodrigo Cuevas, José Luis Fernández, Camilo Froideval, Edson R. Heredia, Manu Jalil, Rubén López Arista, Nacho Molino, David Montuy, Lucas Nunes, Alan Ortiz Grande, Alan Saucedo, Rubén López Arista and Michael Fuller received the nomination.; In 2025, Cancionera was nominated for the category, Jack Lahana, Jack Lahana, and Bernie Grundman, received the nomination.)	2003	Best New Artist	Herself	Nominated	
Latin Grammy Awards	2003	Song of the Year	"En el 2000"	Nominated	
Latin Grammy Awards	2003	Best Rock Song	"En el 2000"	Nominated	
Latin Grammy Awards	2003	Best Rock Solo Vocal Album	Natalia Lafourcade	Nominated	
Latin Grammy Awards	2006	Best Rock Album by a Duo or Group with Vocal	Casa (as Natalia y La Forquetina)	Won	
Latin Grammy Awards	2009	Best Female Pop Vocal Album	Hu Hu Hu	Nominated	
Latin Grammy Awards	2013	Best Alternative Music Album	Mujer Divina – Homenaje a Agustín Lara	Won	
Latin Grammy Awards	2013	Best Long Form Music Video	Mujer Divina – Homenaje a Agustín Lara	Won	
Latin Grammy Awards	2015	Album of the Year	Hasta la Raíz	Nominated	
Latin Grammy Awards	2015	Best Alternative Music Album	Hasta la Raíz	Won	
Latin Grammy Awards	2015	Record of the Year	"Hasta la Raíz"	Won	
Latin Grammy Awards	2015	Song of the Year	"Hasta la Raíz"	Won	
Latin Grammy Awards	2015	Best Alternative Song	"Hasta la Raíz"	Won	
Latin Grammy Awards	2017	Album of the Year	Musas	Nominated	
Latin Grammy Awards	2017	Best Folk Album	Musas	Won	
Latin Grammy Awards	2017	Song of the Year	"Tú Sí Sabes Quererme"	Nominated	
Latin Grammy Awards	2017	Best Long Form Music Video	Musas, El Documental	Won	
Latin Grammy Awards	2018	Album of the Year	Musas, Vol. 2	Nominated	
Latin Grammy Awards	2018	Best Folk Album	Musas, Vol. 2	Won	
Latin Grammy Awards	2018	Record of the Year	"Danza de Gardenias"	Nominated	
Latin Grammy Awards	2018	Song of the Year	"Danza de Gardenias"	Nominated	
Latin Grammy Awards	2020	Album of the Year	Un Canto por México, Vol. 1	Won	
Latin Grammy Awards	2020	Best Alternative Song	"En Cantos"	Won	
Latin Grammy Awards	2020	Best Regional Song	"Mi Religión"	Won	
Latin Grammy Awards	2021	Album of the Year	Un Canto por México, Vol. 2	Nominated	
Latin Grammy Awards	2021	Best Long Form Music Video	Quien Me Tañe Escucha Mis Voces (Documental) (as producer)	Nominated	
Latin Grammy Awards	2022	Best Long Form Music Video	Hasta la Raíz: El Documental	Won	
Latin Grammy Awards	2022	Best Folk Album	Un Canto por México - El Musical	Nominated	
Latin Grammy Awards	2023	Album of the Year	De Todas las Flores	Nominated	
Latin Grammy Awards	2023	Best Singer-Songwriter Album	De Todas las Flores	Won	
Latin Grammy Awards	2023	Record of the Year	"De Todas las Flores"	Won	
Latin Grammy Awards	2023	Song of the Year	"De Todas las Flores"	Nominated	
Latin Grammy Awards	2023	Best Singer-Songwriter Song	"De Todas las Flores"	Won	
Latin Grammy Awards	2024	Best Pop/Rock Song	"5 Horas Menos" (with Conociendo Rusia)	Won	
Latin Grammy Awards	2025	Album of the Year	Cancionera	Nominated	
Latin Grammy Awards	2025	Best Singer-Songwriter Album	Cancionera	Won	
Latin Grammy Awards	2025	Record of the Year	"Cancionera"	Nominated	
Latin Grammy Awards	2025	Song of the Year	"Cancionera"	Nominated	
Latin Grammy Awards	2025	Best Singer-Songwriter Song	"Cancionera"	Won	
Latin Grammy Awards	2025	Best Traditional Pop Album	Natalia Lafourcade Live at Carnegie Hall	Nominated	
Latin Grammy Awards	2025	Best Roots Song	"Como Quisiera Quererte"	Nominated	
Latin Grammy Awards	2025	Best Roots Song	"El Palomo y La Negra"	Nominated	
Lo Nuestro Awards	2004	Rock New Artist of the Year	Herself	Nominated	
Lo Nuestro Awards	2021	Video of the Year	"En Cantos" (with iLe)	Nominated	
MTV Europe Music Awards	2015	Best Latin America North Act	Herself	Nominated	
MTV Europe Music Awards	2017	Best Latin America North Act	Herself	Nominated	
MTV MIAW Awards	2015	Video of the Year	"Hasta la Raíz"	Nominated	
MTV MIAW Awards	2016	Hit of the Year	"Hasta la Raíz"	Nominated	
MTV MIAW Awards	2016	Artist of the Year – Mexico	Herself	Nominated	
MTV MIAW Awards	2017	Best Artist – Mexico	Herself	Nominated	
MTV Video Music Awards Latinoamérica	2003	Artist of the Year	Herself	Nominated	
MTV Video Music Awards Latinoamérica	2003	Best Solo Artist	Herself	Won	
MTV Video Music Awards Latinoamérica	2003	Best Pop Artist	Herself	Won	
MTV Video Music Awards Latinoamérica	2003	Best Artist – Mexico	Herself	Nominated	
MTV Video Music Awards Latinoamérica	2003	Best New Artist – Mexico	Herself	Won	
MTV Video Music Awards Latinoamérica	2005	Best Alternative Artist	as Natalia y La Forquetina	Nominated	
Rolling Stone en Español Awards	2023	Album of the Year	De Todas las Flores	Won	
Rolling Stone en Español Awards	2023	Song of the Year	"Llévame Viento"	Nominated	
Rolling Stone en Español Awards	2023	Artist of the Year	Herself	Won	
Rolling Stone en Español Awards	2023	Music Producer of the Year	Herself	Nominated	
Rolling Stone en Español Awards	2023	Rolling Stone Legend Award	Herself	Won	
WME Awards	2025	Latin American Song	"Cancionera"	Nominated	
