= Hasta la Raíz =

Studio album by Natalia Lafourcade
- Released: March 17, 2015
- Recorded: 2014–2015
- Studios: The Underground Studio at Hotel El Ganzo (Los Cabos); Ártico Estudio (Mexico City); Sonic Ranch (El Paso); Mondomix (Buenos Aires); Sony (Mexico City); Mono Mix Room (Mexico City); 432 (Mexico City)
- Genres: Latin rock; alternative pop; folk
- Length: 52:54
- Language: Spanish
- Labels: Sony Mexico; RCA
- Producers: Natalia Lafourcade; Cachorro López; Leonel García

Natalia Lafourcade chronology
Mujer Divina – Homenaje a Agustín Lara (2012)	Hasta la Raíz (2015)	Musas, Vol. 1 (2017)

Singles from Hasta la Raíz
- 1. "Hasta la Raíz" Released: January 6, 2015; 2. "Nunca Es Suficiente" Released: March 23, 2015; 3. "Lo Que Construimos" Released: September 13, 2015; 4. "Mi Lugar Favorito" Released: December 10, 2015

Hasta la Raíz (transl. To the Root) is the fifth studio album by Mexican singer-songwriter Natalia Lafourcade, released on March 17, 2015, through Sony Music Mexico. After the success of her previous album, Mujer Divina – Homenaje a Agustín Lara (transl. Divine Woman – A Homage to Agustin Lara), a tribute to Mexican singer-songwriter Agustín Lara, Lafourcade decided to record an album with original recordings. Lafourcade spent three years writing the songs and searching for inspiration in different cities, resulting in songs that express very personal feelings regarding love. The record was produced by Lafourcade, with the assistance of Argentinian musician Cachorro López and Mexican artist Leonel García.

Upon its release, Hasta la Raíz received favorable reviews from music critics, with some critics expressing skepticism about her songwriting and saying she had stayed within her comfort zone, and others praising her evolution as a musician and naming the album one of the best pop releases of the year. The record peaked at number eight in the US Billboard Latin Albums and number one in Mexico, where it was certified double platinum and gold, with over 150,000 copies shipped in the country. Hasta la Raíz received a nomination for Album of the Year and won Best Alternative Music Album and Best Engineered Album at the 16th Latin Grammy Awards. The album also won Best Latin Rock, Urban or Alternative Album at the 58th Annual Grammy Awards.

To promote the album, four singles were released, and Lafourcade launched the 2015 Hasta la Raíz Tour to several Latin American countries, the United States, and Europe. The album's first two singles, the title track and "Nunca Es Suficiente" reached the top five in Mexico. In 2023, Rolling Stone placed it at number 15 of the '50 Best Latin American Rock Albums'.

== Background ==
In 2010 Natalia Lafourcade joined Mexican orchestra conductor Alondra de la Parra on the musical project Travieso Carmesí, an album created as part of the Bicentennial of Mexico celebration. While conducting research to find songs for that album, Lafourcade studied Mexican singer-songwriter Agustín Lara's catalog and decided to record a tribute album with his songs. Released in 2012, Mujer Divina earned her accolades for Best Alternative Music Album and Best Long Form Music Video at the 14th Latin Grammy Awards. Two years later, Lafourcade traveled to Veracruz (Mexico), Colombia, and Cuba in a search for musical inspiration and a balance between heart, mind and body. She has said that composition of her new music for Hasta la Raíz was closely woven with the experience of singing Lara's music.

Hasta la Raíz is Lafourcade's sixth studio album and her first album of original material in seven years, since Hu Hu Hu (2009). It was produced by Argentinean musician Cachorro López, Mexican singer-songwriter Leonel García, and Lafourcade after another record producer became too expensive: "I could not afford a very famous producer who had his fees at exorbitant figures, I won't say his name, so I decided to take refuge on my friends [Cachorro and Leonel], doing songs with them as accomplices, and they understood".

== Writing and recording ==
It is the most visceral and personal album. I stripped the soul and was not afraid to put the songs that I was creating. I dedicate it to love and heartbreak and those fragile moments that we have as individuals.

— Lafourcade, Music of the World.

After completing Hu Hu Hu, Lafourcade experienced writer's block, and felt that the songs she was writing were too similar to those in her previous albums. For her new work, she sought inspiration from Agustín Lara's repertoire and her native country, Mexico. "One of the things I wanted to happen with this record was to find the connection with Mexico and its people again". She said she was a Mexican and proud of the "very many" positive parts it has. Musically, she wanted more simplicity in her songs. Lafourcade forced herself to write "without judgement", recording voice memos on her phone as part of the writing process. She was inspired by the works of Latin American songwriters such as Simón Díaz, Violeta Parra, Mercedes Sosa, Chavela Vargas, and Caetano Veloso. While recording demos, Lafourcade realized that the songs were more direct and emotional than her previous work. The writing took three years, resulting in approximately 30 songs. Since the album was about her personal life, she selected what she felt were "the strongest ones", saying, "more than making an album, I wanted to have songs ... that could stand on their own".

The title track, "Hasta la Raíz", was written by Lafourcade and Mexican singer-songwriter Leonel García, with whom she had previously collaborated on her album Mujer Divina and on García's album Todas Mías (2012). García had an idea about the song; they then wrote the music together. Laforcade referred to this collaboration as "magical", saying the song was an anthem to human strength, and about not forgetting one's roots. García played a huapango riff, and Lafourcade started singing along while producer Cachorro López recorded everything, and the final result is from that session.

There are two songs about falling in love, "Mi Lugar Favorito" and "Vámonos Negrito". The former, arranged to emulate emotional outbursts, was the most difficult to finish, and the singer had a hard time trying to find the right place for it on the album. "Vámonos Negrito" is a tribute to her Latin American roots that she started writing after a show in Colombia and finished in Cuba; in this song, one of her favorites, she tried to create a musical landscape with instruments, textures, and harmonies. The bolero "Antes de Huir", is a "sad and hopeful" song. It is about not letting go of the things we love. "Ya No Te Puedo Querer" is, according to Lafourcade, an obscure folk-pop song about finding that one cannot be in a relationship anymore; it was written during a concert tour in Monterrey.

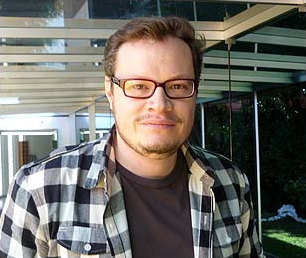
Mexican singer-songwriter Leonel García (pictured in 2011), co-wrote the album title track and co-produced the song "No Más Llorar".

"Para Qué Sufrir" is a song about being all right and trusting someone. Lafourcade wrote the song in a short time but had problems with the chorus, so she asked Torreblanca's lead singer Jose Manuel Torreblanca for help; López made the arrangements. "Nunca Es Suficiente" deals with emotions about a dysfunctional relationship and wanting something more. It was composed by Lafourcade and Daniela Azpiazu and was intended to be performed by Mexican artist Paulina Rubio, since both Lafourcade and Azpiazu wanted to write songs for other artists. However, upon finishing it, they decided to keep the song to themselves and use it either for Aziapizu's project María Daniela y su Sonido Lasser or Lafourcade's album. According to Beverly Bryan of The Village Voice, the song resembles Belle and Sebastian's The Life Pursuit "in its treatment of Sixties-era pop inspirations". Mariano Prunes of AllMusic compared the track to the work of Spanish singer Jeanette on the song "Porque te vas". Lafourcade decided upon the album's title between the songs "Hasta la Raíz" and "Palomas Blancas"; the latter was written in Las Vegas, during her trip to the Grammy Awards. It is a love story filled with metaphors about her love for Mexico, connection with the universe, and self-preservation. The song had the most modified arrangement, being made with few chords.

To create a balance in the track listing, Lafourcade wrote "Te Quiero Ver" as a "simple song" about wanting to be with someone. The track was co-written by Marian Ruzzi and was inspired by the music of the 1970s, including a chorus with answering voices, emulating musical theatre. The lyrics for the jazz song "Lo Que Construimos", deals with the decision to leave someone and going separate ways. "Estoy Lista" is a ballad about being ready to be well, and Lafourcade worked on the track in her spare time, taking a year to finish it. The last track, "No Más Llorar", was written during a family reunion with her father and sister in Chile. Lafourcade wrote it about a love that could not be, her mourning and search for stability, forgiveness, and healing. In live performances, the singer dedicates the track to Mexico, to send hope through her music and help people deal with situations such as the Iguala mass kidnapping. "I feel that nowadays is really important that we acknowledge the social part. We must look inward and work, see which aspects we can address to deliver something more positive to the world".

Regarding the musical arrangements, Lafourcade explained, "I felt that the arrangements had to function as the perfect embrace to the songs ... since each song had its own distinct personality. So it was like creating the ideal musical surroundings. I'm very visual with music, so I always try to create atmospheres, panoramas, and images. Kind of like creating photographs through music". She stated to Venue Magazine that the album sequence was selected to create a cycle, to have a beginning and an ending. Lissette Corsa of MTV Iggy said that the songs are "crafted as expansive, cinematic soundscapes that lend themselves to the mood of each song".

== Critical reception ==
Professional ratings
Review scores
Source	Rating
AllMusic	4.5/5 stars
The Village Voice	favorable
Rolling Stone	4/5 stars

Upon its release, Hasta la Raíz received universal acclaim from music critics. Beverly Bryan of The Village Voice stated that the album "casts a spell with deep feeling, and melodies and lyrics that linger in the mind. Elegantly adorned with subtle strings and velvety production, it has the kind of warmth people are always saying they can hear on old vinyl records". Bryan also predicted that this release would be recognized in the future as the singer's "most profound and enduring statement". In another positive review, Natalia Cano of the magazine Rolling Stone Mexico, referred to the album as "fresh and honest pop, a reflection of her musical maturity", reiterating that the album "continues to place her as one of the most important composer and performer of Latin America." AllMusic's Mariano Prunes gave the album 4.5 out of 5 stars ranking, and on his review stated that "these are extremely well-written songs in the spirit of the great Latin America romantic tradition of which Lara was a founding father, but infused with a contemporary perspective". Luis Romero of the website Coffee and Saturday said that the album is one of the best pop releases of the year, praising Lafourcade's evolution as a musician, but was critical of Lafourcade for not having extended "her comfort zone", since it is too early in her career to become settled in one type of music, "and the proof is that the best album tracks are those where she is helped by Leonel García, Torreblanca and María Daniela". An editor from Televisa Espectáculos wrote a mixed review, commenting that the album has to be listened to twice to "fall in love with at least one song", comparing positively the title track with Lafourcade's work on her previous album (Mujer Divina) and the songs "Mi Lugar Favorito" and "Te Quiero Ver" with her album Hu Hu Hu, creating a "mix of sounds" on which Lafourcade shows all the things she learned after working with Agustín Lara's catalog. Lissette Corsa, of MTV Iggy, stated that "despite moments of darkness and heartfelt sadness, Hasta la Raiz bristles with a sense of adventure and optimism", and noted the influence of Chilean songwriter Violeta Parra in the track "Vámonos Negrito", as part of Lafourcade's "eclectic artistry". Corsa also noted that the singer "drew from Joni Mitchell, Charles Bradley, and Amy Winehouse".

The album earned accolades for Best Alternative Music Album and Best Engineered Album, and was nominated for Album of the Year, at the 16th Annual Latin Grammy Awards. About the nominations, Lafourcade said to the newspaper Al Día, "I am very grateful to the people because this album has allowed me to reach them in a closer way, create a complicity ... I feel very happy and with high expectations, regardless of whether we get the Latin Grammy or not". Billboard columnist Leila Cobo, while reviewing the nominees for the Latin Grammy Award for Album of the Year, stated that this is a "breakthrough album" for the singer, since she is going "beyond her alt roots into commercial territory but with finesse and guts that stay close to her origins". Hasta la Raíz won a Grammy Award for Best Latin Rock, Urban or Alternative Album. The album ranked at number-one in the list for the "10 Best Albums of 2015 in Mexico" by newspaper El País; according to the reviewer Luis Pablo Beauregard, it is an album "naked and raw, where the lyrics and fragility of her voice draw the footprint of heartbreak". The American edition of Rolling Stone magazine placed Hasta la Raíz at number 3 in the list for the "10 Best Latin Albums of the Year", arguing that "the loftiness of the album's ambitions are tempered by Lafourcade's masterful songwriting, which remains as deft as a Mesut Özil cross pass". The editors of Billboard magazine ranked the album at number 2 in the list for the "10 Best Latin Albums of 2015", stating that the singer "manages to be retro and futuristic at the same time ... the sound is so unexpected, that coupled with Lafourcade's sweet vocals, it's arresting". Website AllMusic included the album on their list for the "Best of 2015: Favorite Latin and World Albums", explaining that Lafourcade "delivers an intimate, poignant, quietly powerful collection of heartbreak songs on this gem of an album". In the list Los 600 de Latinoamérica, an acclaimed ranking created by several Latin American music journalists, it was ranked the 14th best album on the list, which covers the years 1920 to 2022.

== Singles ==
The beginning of "Hasta la Raíz"
A sample of "Hasta la Raíz", the lead single from the album, written by Lafourcade and Mexican artist Leonel García, which incorporates elements of huapango music.

The title track, "Hasta la Raíz", was released as the lead single on January 6, 2015. It peaked at number 5 in Mexico's Monitor Latino Pop Chart and number 17 in the U.S. Billboard Latin Pop Songs chart, and won Record of the Year, Song of the Year and Best Alternative Song at the Latin Grammy Awards of 2015. The music video was directed by Alonso Ruizpalacios, at the Estudios Churubusco in Mexico City, gathering 300 fans who responded to an ad published in social networks. "Nunca Es Suficiente" was released as a promo single on January 21, 2015. The music video was released on March 23, 2015, and was directed by Martín Bautista, and features actors Diana Lein, Gustavo Sánchez Parra and Tenoch Huerta. The video presents two couples during different stages of a love relationship. "Nunca Es Suficiente" peaked at number 4 in the Monitor Latino Pop Chart in Mexico. The track "Lo Que Construimos" was selected as the third single, with its music video also directed by Ruizpalacios and premiering on September 13, 2015. On December 10, 2015, was announced that the track "Mi Lugar Favorito" was the fourth single from the album.

== Commercial reception ==
In the United States, the album was available on March 17, 2015, as a digital download only and debuted at number 12 in the Billboard Latin Albums chart, selling 1,000 digital units. On April 14, the album was available on Amazon on Demand, and on September 25, 2015, a physical CD was released. Following Lafourcade's performance at the Latin Grammy Awards of 2015, sales of the album increased 176% and re-entered the Billboard Latin Pop Albums chart at number 7, almost matching its initial peak (number 6). The album re-entered the Latin Albums chart in the week of January 23, 2016, to achieve its highest peak at number 8 and also reached a highest position in the Latin Pop Album chart, at number 5. In the week of April 16, 2016, reached a peak of number 4 at the Latin Pop Album Chart. In Mexico, Hasta la Raíz peaked at number one in the Top 100 Mexico chart and was certified platinum by the Asociación Mexicana de Productores de Fonogramas y Videogramas for the shipment of 60,000 copies. Hasta la Raíz peaked at number 73 in the Spanish Album Chart and 82 in the Italian Album Charts, spending one week on both record charts.

== Tour ==
Lafourcade launched a promotional tour throughout Mexico and only performed at theaters that were at least 100 years old. The Village Voice, reporting on an interview with Lafourcade, noted, "There are enough such grand old structures in her country to make this possible", although according to Lafourcade, "some of them are better maintained than others." The "Hasta la Raíz Tour" opened in Tijuana on April 18, 2015, and also visited several cities in the United States such as San Francisco, Washington, D.C., and New York City. In Hollywood, Lafourcade participated on the Latin Grammy Acoustic Sessions at the Fonda Theatre. A few dates in Argentina, Chile, Italy, and Spain were announced; however, her record label, Sony Music, announced that due to illness the performance in Spain, set for June, would be canceled. In September, Lafourcade performed at "Festival DCODE 2015" in Madrid, Spain. The singer also visited Colombia on October 1, 2015, performing at Bogotá's Royal Center. On November 4, 2015, Lafourcade fulfilled a long-held dream of performing for the first time at the Auditorio Nacional in Mexico City. "I've been here with Julieta Venegas, and someone reminded me that I opened for Juanes a few years ago. When I was 13 years old, I ran away from home with my best friend to come to the Auditorio Nacional to see Christina Aguilera, and I wanted to be on stage, longing to have this opportunity. After many years of work, this became a reality." To further promote the album, Lafourcade became the first Mexican female singer-songwriter to record an acoustic session for the music streaming service Spotify. Titled Spotify Sessions, the live EP includes six tracks from Hasta la Raíz ("Para Qué Sufrir", the title track, "Nunca Es Suficiente", "Ya No Te Puedo Querer", "Palomas Blancas", and "No Más Llorar") and a cover version of Rafael Hernández's "Silencio". Lafourcade performed "Hasta la Raíz" at the Latin Grammy Awards of 2015. Lafourcade also presented the tour in a sold-out show held at the Teatro Cariola in Santiago de Chile, Chile on November 25, 2015.

== Track listing ==
Hasta la Raíz – Standard edition
No.	Title	Writer(s)	Producer(s)	Length
1.	"Hasta la Raíz" ("Down to the Root")	Natalia Lafourcade; Leonel García	Lafourcade; Cachorro López	3:42
2.	"Mi Lugar Favorito" ("My Favorite Place")	Lafourcade	Lafourcade	4:57
3.	"Antes de Huir" ("Before Running Away")	Lafourcade	Lafourcade	3:52
4.	"Ya No Te Puedo Querer" ("I Can't Love You Anymore")	Lafourcade	Lafourcade	4:47
5.	"Para Qué Sufrir" ("Why Suffer")	Lafourcade; Juan Manuel Torreblanca	López; Lafourcade	3:47
6.	"Nunca Es Suficiente" ("It's Never Enough")	Lafourcade; Daniela Azpiazu	López; Lafourcade	3:57
7.	"Palomas Blancas" ("White Pigeons")	Lafourcade	Lafourcade	4:37
8.	"Te Quiero Ver" ("I Wanna See You")	Lafourcade; Marian Ruzzi	Lafourcade	3:27
9.	"Vámonos Negrito" ("Let's Go Negrito")	Lafourcade	Lafourcade	4:34
10.	"Lo Que Construimos" ("What We Built")	Lafourcade	López; Lafourcade	4:39
11.	"Estoy Lista" ("I'm Ready")	Lafourcade	López; Lafourcade	4:42
12.	"No Más Llorar" ("No More Crying")	Lafourcade	Lafourcade; García	5:34

Hasta la Raíz – Special edition
No.	Title	Writer(s)	Producer(s)	Length
13.	"Partir de Mí" ("Start from Me")	Lafourcade	Lafourcade	3:48
14.	"Duele" ("Hurts")	Lafourcade	López; Lafourcade	3:35
15.	"Me Voy de Casa" ("I'm Leaving Home")	Lafourcade; Alejandro Ferreira	Lafourcade; García	4:04
16.	"Lo Que Construimos" (reggae version)	Lafourcade	Lafourcade	5:06
17.	"Hasta la Raíz" (Canova's root version)	Lafourcade; García	Michele Iorfida	3:39

Hasta la Raíz – DVD (Special edition)
No.	Title	Length
1.	"Documentary"
2.	"Hasta la Raíz" (music video)
3.	"Nunca Es Suficiente" (music video)
4.	"Lo Que Construimos" (music video)
5.	"Hasta la Raíz" (lyric video)
6.	"Nunca Es Suficiente" (lyric video)
7.	"Lo Que Construimos" (lyric video)

== Credits and personnel ==
Credits adapted from the liner notes of Hasta la Raíz.

=== Performance credits by song ===
- "Hasta la Raíz":
  - Cachorro López – producer
  - Alan Ortíz – programming
  - Natalia Lafourcade – producer, vocals, keyboard, electric guitar, percussions
  - Gustavo Guerrero – electric guitar, percussion
  - Leonel García – acoustic guitar, voice director
  - Uriel Herrera – drums, percussion
  - José Lugo – percussion
  - Mariana Ruiz – bass guitar
- "Mi Lugar Favorito":
  - Alan Ortíz – programming
  - Natalia Lafourcade – producer, vocals, acoustic guitar, mellotron, keyboards
  - Gustavo Guerrero – electric guitar
  - Uriel Herrera – drums, percussion
  - Mariana Ruiz – bass guitar
  - Daniel Zlotnick – tenor saxophone, baritone saxophone
  - Marcia Medrano – trombone
- "Antes de Huir":
  - Alan Ortíz – programming
  - Natalia Lafourcade – producer, vocals, piano, mellotron
  - Gustavo Guerrero – electric guitar, vocals
  - Uriel Herrera – drums, percussion
  - Mariana Ruiz – bass guitar
  - Daniel Zlotnick – saxophone
- "Ya No Te Puedo Querer":
  - Alan Ortíz – programming and sampling
  - Natalia Lafourcade – producer, vocals, acoustic guitar, piano, keyboard
  - Gustavo Guerrero – electric guitar
  - Uriel Herrera – drums, percussion
  - Mariana Ruiz – bass guitar
  - Juan Carlos Quiterio – French horn
  - Flor Cecilia Meléndez – French horn
- "Para Qué Sufrir":
  - Cachorro López – producer
  - Natalia Lafourcade – producer, vocals, baritone guitar, Hammond organ, keyboards
  - Gustavo Guerrero – electric guitar, vocals
  - Uriel Herrera – percussion, vocals
  - Mariana Ruiz – vocals
- "Nunca Es Suficiente":
  - Cachorro López – producer
  - Natalia Lafourcade – producer, vocals, acoustic guitar, keyboard
  - Alan Ortíz – programming and sampling
  - Gustavo Guerrero – electric guitar, sampling
  - Uriel Herrera – drums, percussion
  - Mariana Ruiz – bass guitar
- "Palomas Blancas":
  - Natalia Lafourcade – producer, vocals, piano, keyboard
  - Gustavo Guerrero – electric guitar
  - Uriel Herrera – drums
  - Mariana Ruiz – bass guitar
- "Te Quiero Ver":
  - Natalia Lafourcade – producer, vocals, acoustic guitar, keyboard
  - Alan Ortíz – programming
  - Gustavo Guerrero – electric guitar, vocals
  - Uriel Herrera – drums, vocals
  - Mariana Ruiz – bass guitar, keyboard, vocals
  - Mark Rudin – trumpet
  - Leonel García – vocals, vocal direction
- "Vámonos Negrito":
  - Natalia Lafourcade – producer, vocals, cuatro, twelve-string guitar
  - Alan Ortíz – programming
  - Gustavo Guerrero – percussion, electric guitar, vocals
  - Alfredo Pino – flugelhorn
- "Lo Que Construimos":
  - Cachorro López – producer
  - Natalia Lafourcade – producer, vocals, acoustic guitar, piano, keyboards
  - Gustavo Guerrero – electric guitar
  - Uriel Herrera – drums, percussion
  - Mariana Ruiz – bass guitar
- "Estoy Lista":
  - Cachorro López – producer
  - Natalia Lafourcade – producer, vocals, piano, keyboards
  - Gustavo Guerrero – electric guitar
  - Uriel Herrera – drums, percussion
  - Mariana Ruiz – bass guitar
- "No Más Llorar":
  - Natalia Lafourcade – producer, vocals, piano, keyboards, vibraphone
  - Leonel García – producer, programming
  - Alan Ortíz – programming
  - Alan Saucedo – programming
  - Gustavo Guerrero – electric guitar
  - Uriel Herrera – drums, vocals
  - Mariana Ruiz – bass guitar, vocals

=== Performance credits ===
- Hannibal Bozydar – violin
- Daniel Jilote – violin
- Armando Gómez – violin
- Andrés Díaz – violin
- Luis Pedro Berrios – violin
- Israel Cruz – violin
- Abraham Becerril – violin
- Ma. Del Carmen Romero – violin
- Alejandro Camacho – viola
- Jesús Millán – viola
- Marlon Pineda – viola
- José Ricardo Rios – cello
- Pedro Reyes – cello
- Omar Barrientos – cello
- Roberto Rosas – double bass
- Rodrigo Chico Avelino – double bass
- José Ángel Lugo Arce – percussions
- Alfredo Pino – trumpet and flugelhorn
- Marcia Medrano – trombon
- Cinthia Quiñones – flute
- Carlos Hernández – flute
- Juan Carlos Quiterio – French horn
- Flor Cecilia Meléndez – French horn
- Daniel Ziotnic – clarinet, saxophone, flute

=== Technical credits ===
- Guillermo Gutiérrez Leyva – A&R
- Gonzalo Herrerias – A&R Sony Music
- Azucena Olvera – A&R Sony Music
- Mara Esquivel – label manager
- Enriqueta Calderón – management
- Javier Montemayor – booking
- Róndine Alcalá – public relations
- José Blanco – mastering
- Eduardo del Águila – recording engineer
- Sebastián Schunt – recording engineer
- Demián Nava – recording engineer
- Alan Saucedo – recording engineer
- Alan Ortíz – recording engineer
- Andrés Borda – recording engineer
- Mark Rudin – assistant engineer
- Héctor Carreón – assistant engineer
- Jerry Ordoñez – assistant engineer
- Manuel Calderón – assistant engineer
- David Bravou – assistant engineer
- Jordy Contreras – assistant engineer
- Jerry Sánchez – assistant engineer
- Jesús Emilio Domínguez – assistant engineer
- Natalia Lafourcade – main performer, strings and metals arrangement
- Mariana Ruiz – strings arrangement
- Pavel Cal – strings arrangement on "No Más Llorar"
- Rodrigo Macías – strings arrangement direction
- Juan Pablo López – audiovisual recording
- Bruno Bancalari – audiovisual recording and photography
- Benjy Estrada – audiovisual recording and photography
- Jorge Juárez – audiovisual recording
- Diego Escalante "Kenka" – audiovisual recording
- Dorian Lopez – design and photography
- Raquel "Richo" Aguirre – photography
- Alexis Rayas – lighting
- Daniel Avilán – make-up
- Manuel Oliva – hair
- Alejandra Quesada – wardrobe
- Vera Félix – wardrobe

== Charts ==
=== Weekly charts ===
Weekly chart performance for Hasta la Raíz
Chart (2015–2016)	Peak position
Italian Albums (FIMI)	82
Mexican Albums (AMPROFON)	1
Spanish Albums (Promusicae)	73
US Top Latin Albums (Billboard)	8
US Latin Pop Albums (Billboard)	4

=== Year-end charts ===
2015 year-end chart performance for Hasta la Raíz
Chart (2015)	Position
Mexican Albums (AMPROFON)	6

2016 year-end chart performance for Hasta la Raíz
Chart (2016)	Position
Mexican Albums (AMPROFON)	40

== Certifications ==
Certifications and sales for Hasta la Raíz
Region	Certification	Certified units/sales
Mexico (AMPROFON)	6× Diamond+3× Platinum+Gold	2,010,000^{‡}
United States (RIAA)	2× Platinum (Latin)	120,000^{‡}
^{‡} Sales+streaming figures based on certification alone.

== Release history ==
Release dates and formats for Hasta la Raíz
Region	Date	Format	Edition(s)	Ref.
Italy	March 17, 2015	Digital download	Standard	
Mexico	March 17, 2015	CD; digital download; LP	Standard	
Mexico	November 13, 2015	CD, digital download	Special edition	
Spain	September 18, 2015	LP	Standard	
United States	March 17, 2015	Digital download	Standard	
United States	September 25, 2015	CD	Standard	

== See also ==
- 2015 in Latin music
- List of number-one albums of 2015 (Mexico)
