= Sony Music Mexico =

Mexican record label

Sony Music Entertainment México S.A. de C.V.
- Logo in use since 2023
- Type: Subsidiary
- Industry: Entertainment
- Genre: Various
- Founded: October 1947; 79 years ago
- Headquarters: Periférico Blvrd Manuel Ávila Camacho 191-int 201-202, Polanco, Mexico City, Mexico
- Key people: Roberto López (President)
- Products: Music; Entertainment
- Parent: Sony Music Entertainment
- Website: sonymusic.com.mx

Sony Music Entertainment México is a Mexican subsidiary of Sony Music Entertainment (SME). It was founded in 1947 as Discos Columbia de México as a subsidiary of Columbia Records.

== History ==
Sony Music Entertainment Mexico and its recording studios opened their doors as part of Discos Columbia de México S.A., having as its first recording “The National Anthem of the United Mexican States” on 8 December 1947. From 1955 until 1 November 1961, Andre Toffel served as general artistic director of the label, responsible for building the company's roster of artists like Rosa de Castilla, Flor Silvestre, Sonia Furió, José Alfredo Jiménez, Amanda del Llano, María de Lourdes, Dora María, Luis Pérez Meza, La Prieta Linda, Elvira Quintana, Cuco Sánchez, and Irma Serrano.

After converting the brand companies from Columbia to CBS Records International in 1961, the company was renamed Discos CBS S.A. in August 1962. In April 1963, it was one of the founding member companies of the current Asociación Mexicana de Productores de Fonogramas y Videogramas (AMPROFON). During the 1960s to 1980s, Discos CBS remained one of the most important record companies in the country.

In 1988, CBS sold Columbia and CBS Records International to Sony Corporation of America, and finally in 1991, Sony renamed CBS International to Sony Music Entertainment, giving it the current name of Sony Music Entertainment México.

From 2004 to 2008, Sony Music Entertainment and the then Bertelsmann Music Group (BMG) founded a joint venture company called Sony BMG Music Entertainment, during those four years, Sony Music México and former longtime rival BMG México (which began in 1949 as RCA Victor Mexicana) worked together as Sony BMG México. Finally Sony Music bought BMG in 2008, and returned to the name Sony Music México, absorbing the entire BMG catalog.

== Sub-labels ==
- Discos Anónimos
- M4 Records
- One Life Music
- Babilonia Music

== Artists ==
=== Current ===
The follow is a list of artists current signed to Sony Music Mexico:

- Alex Fernández
- Ana Gabriel
- Carlos Rivera
- Christian Nodal
- Edén Muñoz
- Gerardo Ortiz
- Ha*Ash
- Kenia Os
- Lila Downs
- Little Jesus
- Matisse
- Natalia Lafourcade
- Pandora
- Reik
- Vicente Fernandez
- Yeri Mua
- Yuri
- Yuridia

=== Former ===
- Alejandro Fernandez
- Amandititita
- Belinda
- CD9
- Fey
- Gloria Trevi
- Humbe
- Julieta Venegas
