= Mujer Divina – Homenaje a Agustín Lara =

Studio album by Natalia Lafourcade
- Released: September 18, 2012
- Recorded: 2011–2012
- Genres: Pop; alternative pop
- Length: 49:14
- Language: Spanish
- Labels: Sony; RCA
- Producers: Natalia Lafourcade; Cachorro López; Emmanuel del Real; Ernesto García; Gregory Rogove; Noah Georgeson

Natalia Lafourcade chronology
Hu Hu Hu (2009)	Mujer Divina – Homenaje a Agustín Lara (2012)	Hasta la Raíz (2015)

Singles from Mujer Divina – Homenaje a Agustín Lara
- 1. "La Fugitiva" Released: July 30, 2012; 2. "Limosna" Released: February 21, 2013; 3. "Mujer Divina" Released: July 1, 2013; 4. "Aventurera" Released: October 24, 2013

Mujer Divina – Homenaje a Agustín Lara (transl. Divine Woman – Tribute to Agustín Lara), is the fourth studio album and first tribute album by Mexican singer-songwriter Natalia Lafourcade. The project is a tribute to Mexican singer and songwriter Agustín Lara and is composed of songs by him featuring different guest singers such as Adrián Dárgelos from Babasónicos, León Larregui from Zoé, Devendra Banhart, Kevin Johansen, Adanowsky, Emmanuel del Real, Miguel Bosé, Ismael Salcedo from Los Daniels, Leonardo de Lozanne, Lila Downs, Leonel García, Jorge Drexler and Francisco Familiar from DLD. The album was released on September 18, 2012. The project was accompanied by a DVD of live versions of the songs of the album. A live version of the album recorded at the Sala Telefónica from the Centro Cultural Roberto Cantoral was released on February 11, 2014.

At the 14th Annual Latin Grammy Awards, the album won Best Alternative Music Album and Best Long Form Music Video while Carlos Campón, Ernesto García, Noah Georgeson, Demian Nava, Sebastían Schon, César Sogbe and José Blanco received a nomination for Best Engineered Album as engineers of the album.

== Background ==
After the release of her previous projects, Las 4 Estaciones del Amor (2007) and Hu Hu Hu (2009), Lafourcade felt the need to explore new music with already existing songs instead of original songs. When working with Alondra de la Parra for a performance in Mexico City, she started to search songs from different composers to perform and end up finding a deep connection to Agustín Lara's work.

The name of the album, according to Lafourcade comes from the way women were the main inspiration for Lara and how his songs made her "appreciate the beauty of women and femininity". The album is composed of songs from Lara featuring guest singers, to balance the themes of femininity, Lafourcade decided that the guest singers would be mostly male.

== Track listing ==
All tracks are written by Agustín Lara, except where noted.

Mujer Divina – Homenaje a Agustín Lara
No.	Title	Writer(s)	Producer(s)	Length
1.	"Mujer Divina" (with Adrián Dárgelos)		Emmanuel del Real	3:29
2.	"Limosna" (with Meme)		Cachorro López	3:53
3.	"Imposible" (with León Larregui)		Del Real	4:01
4.	"Farolito" (with Gilberto Gil)		Ernesto García; Natalia Lafourcade	2:41
5.	"La Fugitiva" (with Kevin Johansen)		López	3:15
6.	"Piensa en Mí" (with Vicentico)	María Teresa Lara	López	3:56
7.	"Si No Pueden Quererte" (with Miguel Bosé)		García; Lafourcade	3:56
8.	"Morir y Renacer" (with Adanowsky)		García; Lafourcade	3:49
9.	"Amor, Amor de Mis Amores" (with Devendra Banhart)	M. T. Lara	Gregory Rogove; Noah Georgeson	3:57
10.	"Aventurera" (with Alex Ferreira)		García; Lafourcade	3:32
11.	"Oración Caribe" (with Jorge Drexler)	M. T. Lara	Carlos Campón	3:45
12.	"Azul" (with Rodrigo Amarante)	M. T. Lara	Rogove; Georgeson	4:51
13.	"María Bonita" (Acoustic Version)		Lafourcade	4:09
Total length:				49:14

== Charts ==
=== Weekly charts ===
Weekly chart performance for Mujer Divina – Homenaje a Agustín Lara
Chart (2012)	Peak position
Mexican Albums (AMPROFON)	3

=== Year-end charts ===
Year-end chart performance for Mujer Divina – Homenaje a Agustín Lara
Chart (2012)	Position
Mexican Albums (AMPROFON)	31

== Certifications ==
Certifications for Mujer Divina – Homenaje a Agustín Lara
Region	Certification	Certified units/sales
Mexico (AMPROFON)	3× Platinum+Gold	210,000^{‡}
^{‡} Sales+streaming figures based on certification alone.
