= Sarah Lee Guthrie & Johnny Irion =

American musical duo (2000–2014)

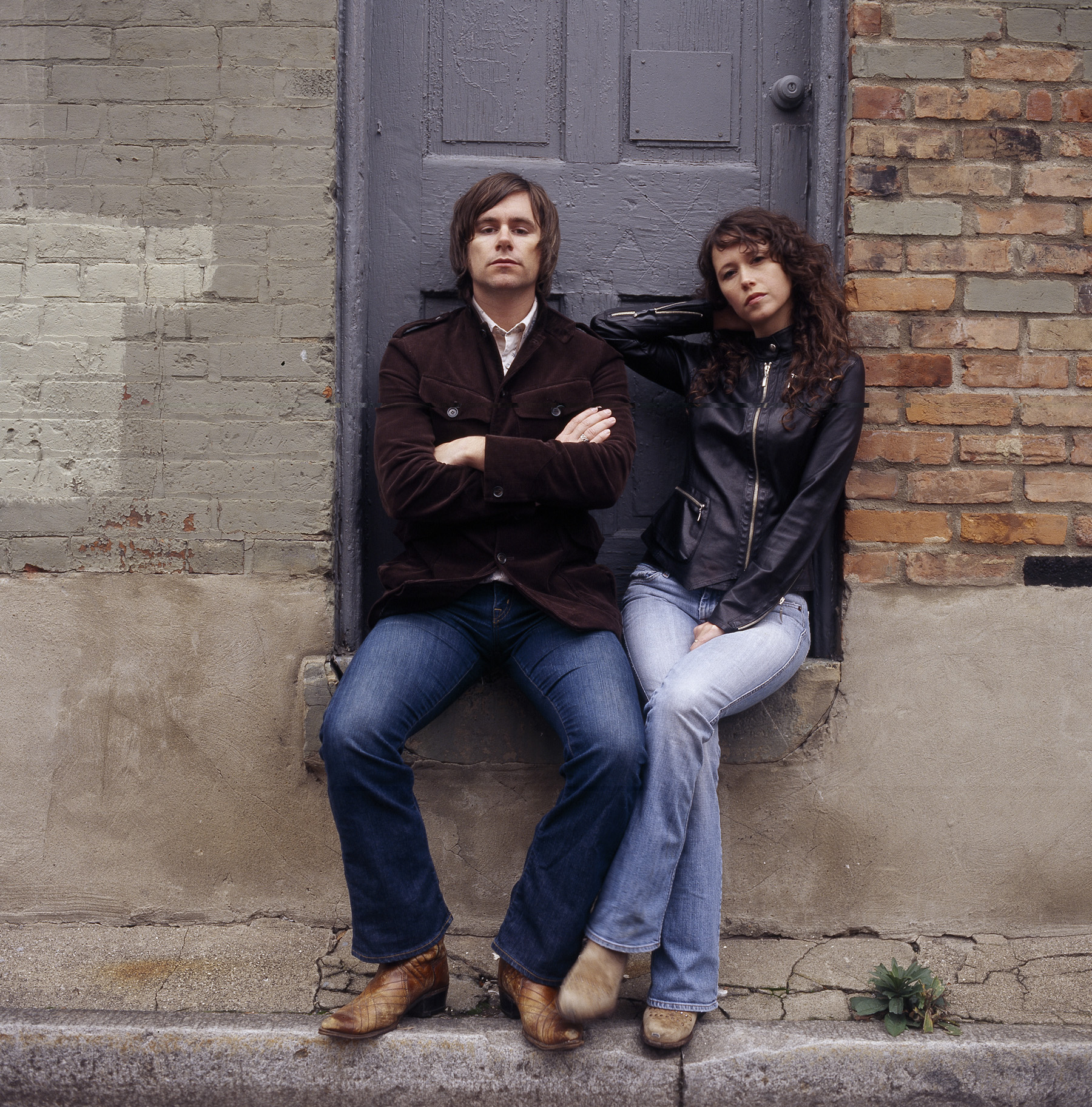
- Guthrie and Irion in 2008

Background information
- Origin: California, United States
- Genres: Folk, country rock
- Years active: 2000–2014
- Labels: New West, Ninth Street Opus Rt.8/RCAM
- Past members: Sarah Lee Guthrie; Johnny Irion
- Website: johnnyirionmusic.com

Sarah Lee Guthrie (born February 17, 1979) and John Phillip Irion (born February 3, 1969) were a musical duo. Guthrie and Irion were married on October 16, 1999, and began performing together as an acoustic duo in late 2000, performing together until they divorced in the mid-2010s. Their music combined Irion's love of rock and blues with Guthrie's roots of folk and country.

== Early lives ==
=== Guthrie ===
Guthrie is the youngest daughter of folksinger Arlo Guthrie and the paternal granddaughter of Woody Guthrie. As a third generation singer-songwriter Guthrie released her first self-titled album on the family owned and operated Rising Son Records in 2002. As a child she was involved in theater and dance. Her interest in music was sparked when she worked as her father's road manager on the 1997 Further Festival tour and saw other members of the tour group having fun at late-night hootenannies. She picked up an acoustic guitar and started playing as a way to join in on the fun. "I always wrote poems, so it wasn't that far off for me to turn that into songs."

My dad was absolutely thrilled, of course, and would teach me stuff every day when we were on the road together. That was a really cool way to get to know my dad, because I'd never known him that way. And that's another thing that made it easy: my dad was so supportive.

=== Irion ===
Irion originates from a family of artists. Authors John Steinbeck and son Thomas Steinbeck are his great-uncle and first cousin-once removed, respectively. His late grandmother, Rubilee Knight, was a classical violinist, while his late grandfather, Fred Palladino Knight, sang tenor in numerous venues. Irion and Guthrie met through a mutual friend (Chris Robinson of the Black Crowes) while the two were working together in Los Angeles. In 1999 Guthrie and Irion joined guitarist Tao Rodríguez-Seeger, grandson of Pete Seeger, and performed as a trio under the name RIG.

== Career ==
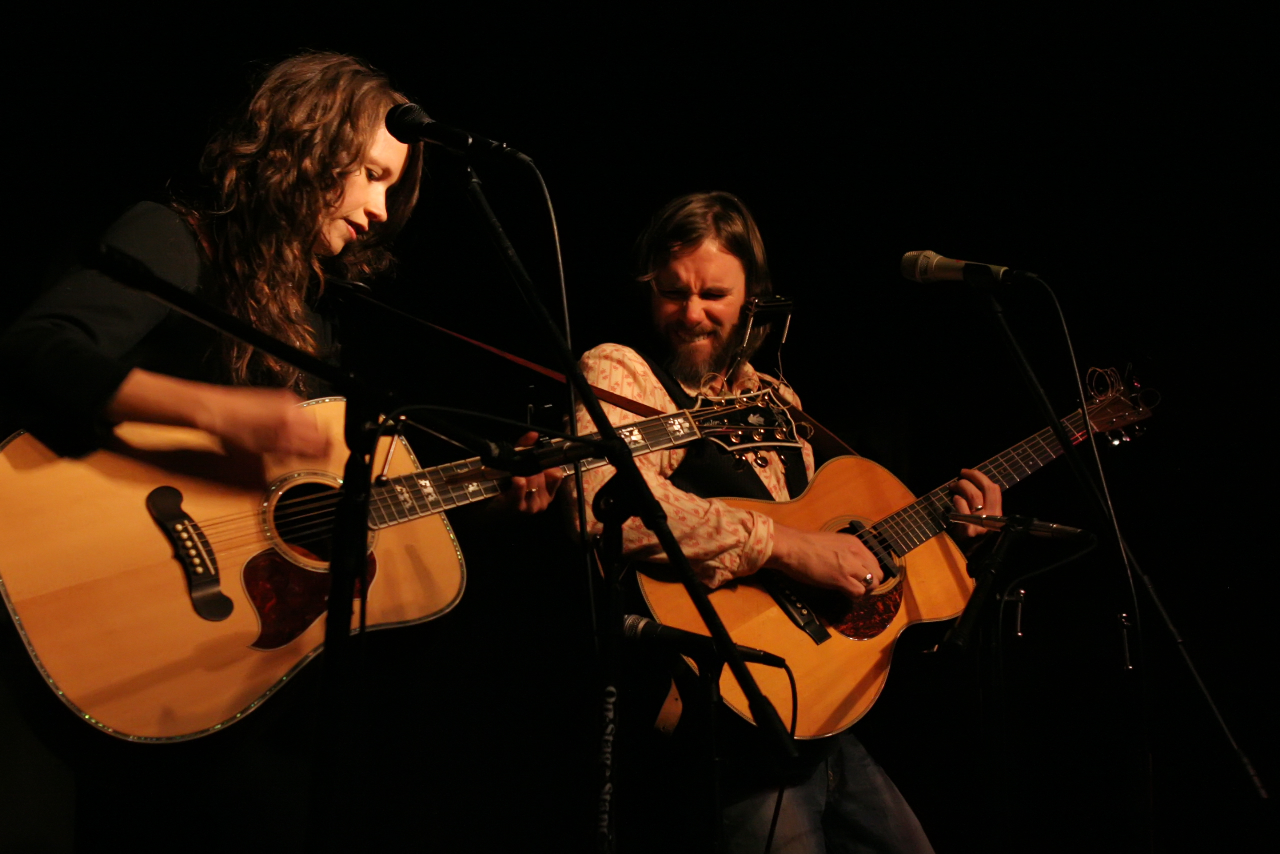
Sarah Lee Guthrie & Johnny Irion performing live for Valentine's Day 2008 at Tales From The Tavern at The Maverick Saloon in Santa Ynez, CA.

Guthrie and Irion have appeared at the Newport Folk Festival, the Philadelphia Folk Festival, and Hillside Festival, as well as nationwide theatres, listening rooms, performing art centers, and schools. When not performing their own shows they tour nationally with Arlo Guthrie, opening the show, then joining him onstage in their family concert series. They performed at Carnegie Hall with Pete Seeger and The Dillards in 2002, celebrating Woody Guthrie's 90th Year.

Go Waggaloo, their first children's CD, was released in October 2009 on the Smithsonian Folkways label. Sarah Lee Guthrie is joined by Irion and their two daughters, as well as numerous friends and family members including Arlo Guthrie, Pete Seeger and Tao Rodriguez-Seeger. The album includes three songs featuring lyrics by Woody Guthrie never before put to music and eight songs written by Sarah Lee and family. The Parents' Choice Foundation awarded Go Waggaloo a Gold Medallion. The Parents' Choice Awards program honors the best material for children in the categories of: books, toys, music and storytelling, magazines, software, videogames, television and websites.

In 2011, Sarah Lee and Johnny signed with Berkeley independent record label, Ninth Street Opus and released Bright Examples. The collaborative project features producers Andy Cabic (lead singer-songwriter in the band Vetiver (band)) and Thom Monahan (Devendra Banhart, Vetiver (band)).

In 2012 – the centennial year of Woody Guthrie's birth – an album of newly composed songs using Woody Guthrie's lyrics was released: New Multitudes. At a centennial celebration tribute concert held on March 10, 2012, at the Brady Theater in Tulsa, Oklahoma, Sarah Lee and Johnny performed along with John Mellencamp, Arlo Guthrie, the Del McCoury Band and the Flaming Lips.

Jeff Tweedy produced Sarah Lee Guthrie and Johnny Irion's album, Wassaic Way, released in 2013. It was recorded in Chicago – Tweedy's hometown – and garnered him a Grammy nomination as producer.

Guthrie and Irion amicably broke up in 2014, which Guthrie did not publicly acknowledge until 2023. In 2018, each embarked on solo projects, with Guthrie serving as opening act for her father's "Alice's Restaurant: Back by Popular Demand" tour and Irion releasing a rock album Driving Friend.

== Discography ==
Albums by Sarah Lee Guthrie & Johnny Irion
Year	Title	Artist	Label
1994	Weave	Johnny Irion / Queen Sarah Saturday	Thirsty Ear
2002	Sarah Lee Guthrie	Sarah Lee Guthrie	Rising Son Records
2004	Entirely Live [EP]	Sarah Lee Guthrie & Johnny Irion	Rte. 8
2005	Exploration	Sarah Lee Guthrie & Johnny Irion	Rte. 8
2009	Folksong [DVD and CD]	Sarah Lee Guthrie & Johnny Irion	Rte. 8
2009	Go Waggaloo	Sarah Lee Guthrie & Family	Smithsonian Folkways
2011	Bright Examples	Sarah Lee Guthrie & Johnny Irion	Ninth Street Opus
2013	Wassaic Way	Sarah Lee Guthrie & Johnny Irion	Rte. 8
