= The Raymond Brake =

American indie rock band

- Origin: Greensboro, North Carolina
- Genres: Indie rock
- Years active: 1994–1998
- Labels: Simple Machines; Hepcat; Crunchy Records Stuff; Friction Media; Detox
- Past members: Andy Cabic: guitar, vocals Ryan Stewart: guitar, vocals Peder Hollinghurst: bass 1994-1996; Matt Houston: bass 1997-1998; Joel Darden: drums

The Raymond Brake was an indie rock band. They formed in the mid-1990s in Greensboro, North Carolina. The band was influenced by the thriving music scene of nearby Chapel Hill.

== History ==
The band's first releases were two 7-inch records, both released in 1994. A debut LP, Piles of Dirty Winters was released on Arlington Virginia indie label Simple Machines in 1995, followed by a split 7-inch. Reviews of The Raymond Brake's releases often noted that the band's sound blended strange tunings and timings with hooks and melody, observations which in turn led to comparisons to bands such as Polvo and Grifters. The band embarking on a tour of the U.S. in 1996 with Karate, Archers of Loaf, and Liquorice. However, the same year saw The Raymond Brake's final release: the Never Work Ever CD EP on Hepcat Records. In 1998 the band had played their last show. Singer and guitarist Andy Cabic moved to San Francisco, and began performing with Devendra Banhart and Joanna Newsom. He is currently the driving force behind Vetiver.

Drummer Joel Darden continues to play for the Greensboro-based band, The Kneads.

== Members ==
- Andy Cabic – guitar, vocals (1994–1998)
- Ryan Stewart – guitar, vocals (1994–1998)
- Peder Hollinghurst – bass (1994–1996)
- Matt Houston – bass (1997–1998)
- Joel Darden – drums (1994–1998)
