= Thing of the Past =

Studio album by Vetiver
- Released: May 13, 2008
- Recorded: 2007
- Studio: The Hangar (Sacramento); Melva (Los Angeles); Werehome (London)
- Genre: Folk rock
- Length: 44:36
- Label: Gnomonsong (U.S.); FatCat Records (UK)
- Producer: Thom Monahan, Andy Cabic

Vetiver chronology
To Find Me Gone (2006)	Thing of the Past (2008)	Tight Knit (2009)

Professional ratings
Review scores
Source	Rating
AllMusic	4.5/5 stars
Pitchfork	6.5/10
Dusted	Not rated

Thing of the Past is the third studio album by the American folk band Vetiver, released in 2008 by Gnomonsong in the U.S. and FatCat Records in the UK.

The album consists of cover songs originally performed by songwriters that frontman Andy Cabic considers influential in his music and life. Several of the original authors appear as guests on their respective songs, including Michael Hurley. Recorded in spring 2007 in Sacramento and Los Angeles, the basic tracks, including all the guitars, drums, bass and some of the vocals, were recorded live in the studio. Cabic considered it his best album up to that point, calling it an "experiment" which offered him both "restraint and freedom".

Rhapsody praised the album, calling it one of their favorite covers albums.

== Track listing ==
1. "Houses" (Elyse Weinberg) – 3:43
2. "Roll on Babe" (Derroll Adams) – 4:27
3. "Sleep a Million Years" (Dia Joyce) – 2:54
4. "Hook & Ladder" (Norman Greenbaum) – 3:10
5. "To Baby" (Biff Rose) – 4:26
6. "The Road to Ronderlin" (Ian Matthews) – 2:24
7. "Lon Chaney" (Garland Jeffreys) – 4:21
8. "Hurry on Sundown" (Dave Brock) – 6:29
9. "The Swimming Song" (Loudon Wainwright III) – 2:41
10. "Blue Driver" (Michael Hurley) – 3:55
11. "Standin'" (Townes Van Zandt) – 3:39
12. "I Must Be in a Good Place Now" (Bobby Charles) – 4:30

== Personnel ==
Musicians

- Andy Cabic – vocals (1–12), acoustic guitar (1–6, 8, 9, 11), banjo (9), guitar (10, 12)
- Kevin Barker – acoustic guitar (1–2, 4), guitar (3, 5, 11, 12), banjo (4, 9), vocals (4), 12-string acoustic guitar (8)
- Sanders Trippe – guitar (1, 3, 5, 6, 10, 12), acoustic guitar (2, 4, 11), vocals (4), harmonica (8), 12-string acoustic guitar (9)
- Brent Dunn – bass (1, 2, 5, 6, 8–11), double bass (3, 4, 7, 12), vocals (4)
- Otto Hauser – drums (1–6, 8–12), organ (1), vocals (4), piano (7)
- Abigail Chapin – vocals (1, 11)
- Lily Chapin – vocals (1, 11)
- "Farmer" Dave Scher – keyboard (2, 5), pedal steel (2, 6), melodica (2, 4)
- Vashti Bunyan – vocals (3)
- Jason Quever – piano (3, 5), keyboard (5)
- Michael Hurley – mock trumpet (4), vocals (1)
- Meara O'Reilly – vocals (4, 8)
- Emma Smith – violin (7, 9)
- Ben Kunin – sarod (8)
- Jonathan Wilson – acoustic guitar (11)

Technical

- Thom Monahan – producer, engineer, mixing
- Andy Cabic – producer, art direction
- JJ Golden – mastering
- Adem Ilhan – additional recording
- Alissa Anderson – photography
- Nathaniel Russell – design, lettering
