= Lauren Dukoff =

American photographer (born 1984)

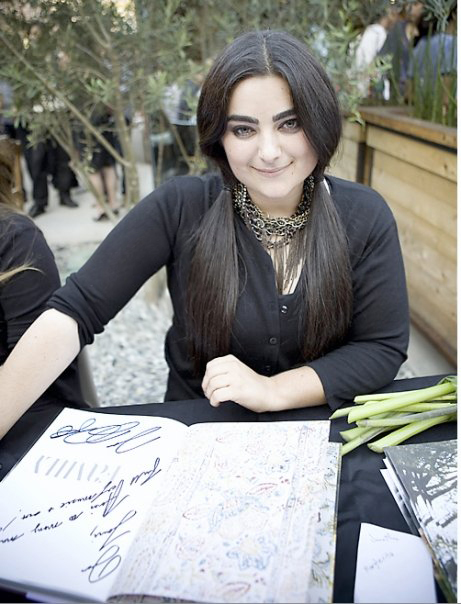
Lauren Dukoff, 2009

Lauren Dukoff (born 1984) is an American photographer noted for her portraiture and documentary work of celebrities and musicians, including the cover of the Adele album, 21.

== Photography career ==
Dukoff briefly studied photography at the Brooks Institute of Photography but left after one year. She learned photography from her father who was a commercial director and still photographer. Dukoff got her start by documenting the musical career of long-time friend Devendra Banhart. Dukoff was also mentored by music photographer Autumn de Wilde.

Dukoff has photographed Beyoncé, Adele, Lady Gaga, Charlene, Princess of Monaco, Sting, Katy Perry, Devendra Banhart, M.I.A., Kim Gordon, Beck, Justin Bieber, Mary J. Blige, Morrissey, Neil Young, Joanna Newsom, Lil Wayne, Alicia Keys, Sean 'P. Diddy' Combs, The Strokes, Mila Kunis, Natalie Portman, Charlotte Gainsbourg, Olivia Wilde, Zooey Deschanel, the cast of True Blood, Mad Men and Glee as well as a number of other musicians and actors such as Selma Blair and Sophia Bush. Dukoff’s photos have appeared on the cover of Vogue Japan, Rolling Stone, and on the pages of Japanese Vogue, L'uomo Vogue, Elle Magazine, Vanity Fair, Nylon, The Guardian, Los Angeles Times, Another Magazine, Dazed & Confused, Oyster Magazine, W Magazine along with many other publications. In addition to her celebrity and editorial work, Dukoff has shot major ad campaigns for clients such as Nike, Reebok, LG, Adidas, and Ford.

Chronicle Books published her first book, Family, in 2009. Family collected 100 of Dukoff’s portraits and candid images of Devendra Banhart, Joanna Newsom, Entrance, Bat for Lashes, Feathers, Espers, Vetiver, Bert Jansch, Vashti Bunyan, and many others individually and together, in performance and more private spaces. Complementing the photographs are a foreword by Devendra Banhart, text and artwork by the musicians, biographies, and a digital download of music by artists featured in the book. When interviewed about the book Dukoff said "FAMILY is simply a documentation of a moment in time among friends. I am not trying to make a statement about the music they make.

Lauren Dukoff has exhibited her work at the UCLA Hammer Museum in Los Angeles in collaboration with a performance by Devendra Banhart's and Gregory Rogove's project entitled Megapuss. the San Francisco Eleanor Harwood Gallery, REDCAT in Los Angeles Galerie Chappe in Paris and The Monster Children Gallery in Sydney. To celebrate the release of her photography book Family, Dukoff had a solo show at Gallery Space located in Space 15 Twenty in Los Angeles, CA. Dukoff curated performances and film nights that included Devendra Banhart, Matteah Baim, Hecuba and others to celebrate the release.

== Technical information ==
Dukoff works almost exclusively with the medium format film camera. Mamiya 645 She has expressed her devotion to shooting film vs digital and can be quoted saying "I am a film photographer, it's what I do and it is one element that helps define my style".

== Musician ==
Lauren Dukoff has been credited as playing flute on Devendra Banhart's 2004 release Nino Rojo, Banhart's 2007 release Smokey Rolls Down Thunder Canyon, and Matteah Baim's 2007 release Death of the Sun.

== Personal life ==
Lauren Dukoff lives and works in Los Angeles and is known as Lo or Lolo to her friends and family. She has close personal relationships with many of the creatives she works with such as Adele, Kate and Laura Mulleavy of Rodarte, Tavi Gevinson, Natasha Kahn and Devendra Banhart.

== Bibliography ==
- Family: Photographs by Lauren Dukoff (Author), Devendra Banhart (Foreword), Chronicle Books ISBN 978-0-8118-6662-0
