= Jana Hunter / Devendra Banhart =

Jana Hunter/Devendra Banhart

Studio album (split) by Jana Hunter and Devendra Banhart
- Released: 2005
- Recorded: 2005
- Genre: Folk rock, acoustic, freak folk
- Length: 30:04
- Label: Troubleman Unlimited
- Producer: Jana Hunter; Devendra Banhart

Devendra Banhart chronology
Cripple Crow (2005)	Jana Hunter/Devendra Banhart (2005)	Smokey Rolls Down Thunder Canyon (2007)

Jana Hunter chronology
The Golden Apples of the Sun (2004)	Jana Hunter/Devendra Banhart (2005)	Blank Unstaring Heirs of Doom (2005)

Professional ratings
Review scores
Source	Rating
Pitchfork Media	(7.0/10)

Jana Hunter/Devendra Banhart is a self-titled split album by Devendra Banhart and Jana Hunter, released in 2005 on LP only by Troubleman Unlimited. It features cover art by Arthur Bates and pressed on yellow vinyl.

All songs on side one by Jana Hunter. All songs on side two by Devendra Banhart, except as indicated.

== Track listing ==
=== Side one (Jana Hunter) ===
1. "Black Haven" – 2:21
2. "A Bright-Ass Light" – 2:21
3. "Crystal Lariat" – 3:01
4. "That Dragon Is My Husband" – 2:21
5. "Laughing and Crying" – 1:14

=== Side two (Devendra Banhart) ===
1. "At the Hop" (Devendra Banhart/Andy Cabic)– 2:52
2. "In Golden Empress Hands" – 2:08
3. "We All Know" – 2:36
4. "The Good Red Road" – 3:34
5. "Little Monkey/Step in the Name of Love" (R. Kelly)– 7:36
