= Oh Me Oh My =

Oh Me Oh My is the name of:

- Oh Me Oh My (Devendra Banhart album), 2002
- Oh Me Oh My (Lonnie Holley album), 2023
- "Oh Me Oh My (I'm a Fool for You Baby)", a song by Aretha Franklin and Lulu, 1969
