= Jana Hunter =

American songwriter and musician

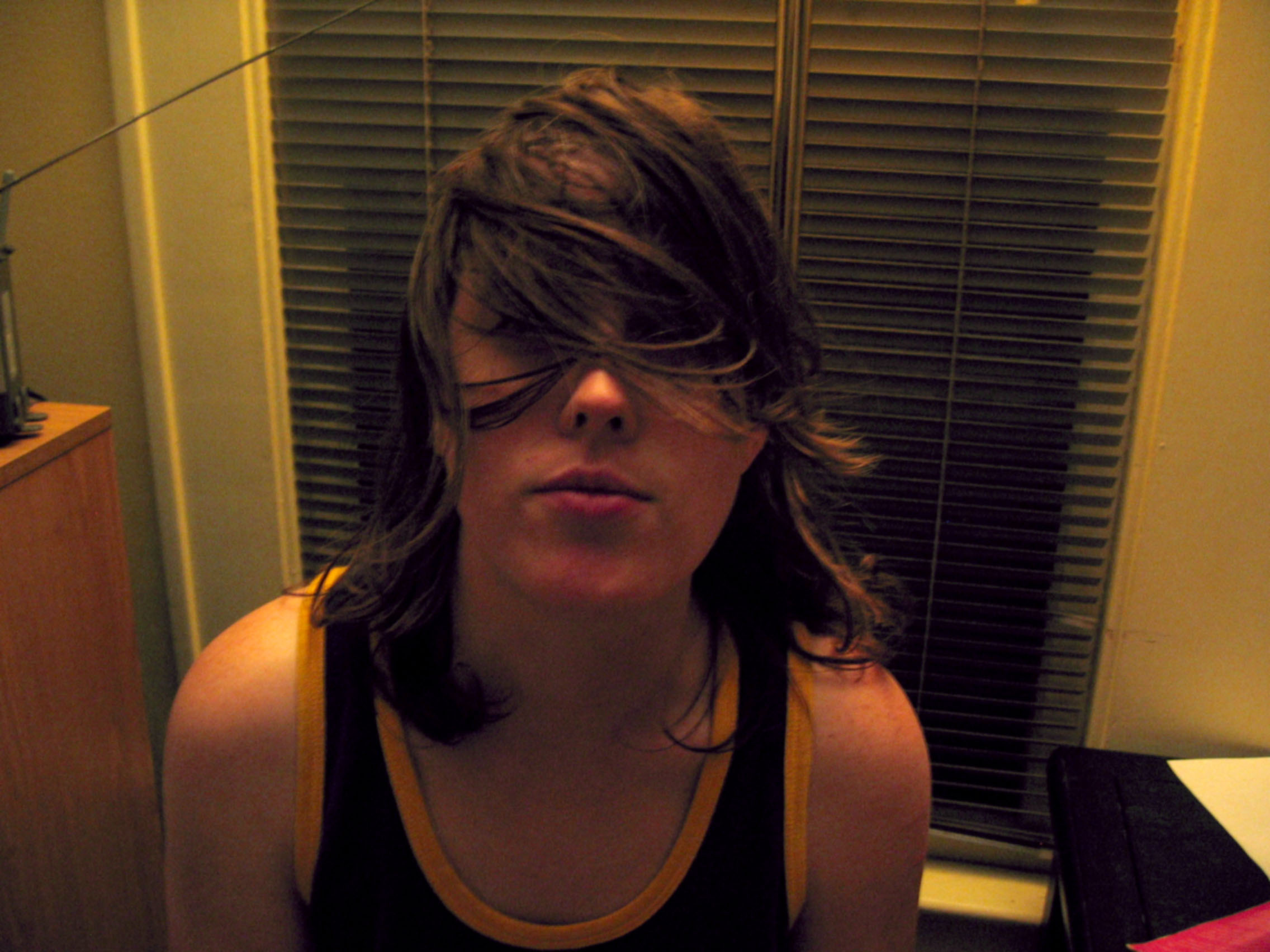
- Hunter in 2006

Background information
- Origin: Houston, Texas, United States
- Genres: Lo-fi, experimental
- Labels: Gnomonsong, Ribbon Music

Jana Hunter is an American songwriter and musician based in Baltimore.

== Early life ==
Hunter was born in Texas. His family is Catholic, but he no longer follows Catholicism.

== Recording and band membership ==
Hunter was signed to Gnomonsong, a record label run by Devendra Banhart and Vetiver's Andy Cabic. Hunter's solo debut album Blank Unstaring Heirs of Doom was the label's debut release. In 2007 Hunter founded an independent record label based in Houston, Texas, Feow! Records, with musicians Matthew Brownlie of Bring Back the Guns and Arthur Bates of Houston band Wicked Poseur.

Hunter was the singer and primary songwriter for Lower Dens. After releasing their debut, Twin-Hand Movement, on Gnomonsong in 2010, Lower Dens were one of the first bands signed to the Ribbon Music label and released their second album, Nootropics, on Ribbon in 2012.

Hunter has performed and/or recorded as a member of Jracula, Castanets, Matty & Mossy, Ejaculette, Unitus, and Krazy Nerds, and played in/recorded for Sharon Van Etten, Trentemøller, Food Pyramid, Airwaves, Indian Jewelry, Matteah Baim, Metallic Falcons, Phosphorescent, and CocoRosie.

Hunter is the inspiration for several characters in the stories of J.M. Appel, including providing the basis for Maggie in the novella Fallout (2010).

== Touring ==
Hunter has toured with Tara Jane O'Neil, Devendra Banhart, Rasputina, Viking Moses, Castanets, Deer Tick, Marissa Nadler, Peter & the Wolf, Cass McCombs, and Woozyhelmet, among others. In 2005, Hunter accompanied Meadows, Lights, and Mouth of Leaves on their Summer of Golden Blood tour throughout the South. In 2006, Hunter performed at North East Sticks Together.

Hunter has appeared at Mad Vicky's Tea House in Brooklyn, New York, owned by "Mad Vicky", Bianca Casady of the musical duo CocoRosie.

In 2019, Hunter created a special playlist for Billboard's Summer of Pride event. The playlist, which can be found on Spotify, includes songs by various artists, including The Smiths and Stevie Wonder. Hunter said in the corresponding interview that these songs had both helped and inspired him whilst growing up:

I was wild and in a lot of pain as a kid; home life was very bleak, and pop songs were a guaranteed escape to a mental space where beauty, wonder, and love were possible. I wanted to write songs that might have the potential to do that.

== Matty and Mossy ==
Hunter founded and played in the Houston band Matty & Mossy with Heath Flagtvedt, Matt Frey and John Hunter. Their album, Fraimers Haimey, was recorded in Athens, Georgia with Chris Bishop and released on Fleece Records. The album reached #1 on the radio charts of Rice Radio and KSPC, and songs from the album were used in the soundtrack of Andrew Bujalski's films Funny Ha Ha and Mutual Appreciation.

== Personal life ==
Hunter was assigned female at birth. In 2014, Hunter came out as gender fluid (or non-binary), as well as being neither gay nor straight, stating that he "feel[s] extremely fortunate in that I truly don’t give a fuck when it comes to the gender of the person I’m dating". He also identifies as transmasculine.

In August 2019, an article by Billboard.com stated that Hunter preferred he/him pronouns. In an interview for the same magazine a month later, Hunter discussed his experience undergoing hormone replacement therapy, disclosing he had undergone top surgery and discussing the difficulties of testosterone lowering both his speaking and singing voice.

In 2021, Hunter revealed he had been diagnosed as having autism and attention deficit hyperactivity disorder.

== Discography ==
=== Albums ===
- The Competition (with Lower Dens) (Ribbon Music) September 5, 2019
- Escape from Evil (with Lower Dens) (Ribbon Music) March 31, 2015
- Nootropics (with Lower Dens) (Ribbon Music) May 1, 2012
- Twin-Hand Movement (with Lower Dens) (Gnomonsong) July 20, 2010
- Carrion EP CD (Gnomonsong) September 18, 2007
- Carrion EP LP (Woodsist) September 2007
- There's No Home CD/LP (Gnomonsong) April 7, 2007
- Blank Unstaring Heirs of Doom CD (Gnomonsong) October 4, 2005
- Jana Hunter / Devendra Banhart LP (split with Devendra Banhart) (Troubleman Unlimited) 2005
- JH CD-R (self-released) 2004
- JH CD-R (self-released) 2003

=== Compilation appearances ===
- The Enlightened Family CD (Voodoo-EROS), 2005
- The Black and White Skins CD (Les Disques du Crépuscule), 2005
- The Golden Apples of the Sun CD (Bastet), 2004
