= Vetiver (album) =

Studio album by Vetiver
- Released: 2004
- Genre: Folk
- Length: 44:57
- Label: DiCristina
- Producer: Andy Cabic, Thom Monahan

Vetiver chronology
Vetiver (2004)	To Find Me Gone (2006)

Professional ratings
Review scores
Source	Rating
AllMusic	4/5 stars
Pitchfork Media	(8.3/10)

Vetiver is the debut album by folk band Vetiver. It was released in 2004 on DiCristina.

== Track listing ==
1. "Oh Papa" – 2:38
2. "Without a Song" – 4:36
3. "Farther On" – 2:49
4. "Amour Fou" with Devendra Banhart – 4:34
5. "Los Pajaros del Rio" with Devendra Banhart – 3:44
6. "Amerilie" – 3:14
7. "Arboretum" – 1:59
8. "Angels' Share" – with Hope Sandoval 4:21
9. "Luna Sea" – 4:17
10. "Belles" – 5:06
11. "On a Nerve" – 7:39

== Personnel ==
Musicians

- Alissa Anderson – cello
- Devendra Banhart – guitar, vocals, background vocals
- Andy Cabic – banjo, guitar, vocals
- Jim Gaylord – violin
- Nick Holdzkom – piano
- Craig Koozer – bass, bass guitar
- Joanna Newsom – harp
- Colm O'Ciosoig – drums
- Hope Sandoval – vocals

Production

- Thom Monahan – audio engineer, audio production, engineer
