= Lower Dens =

American alternative indie pop band

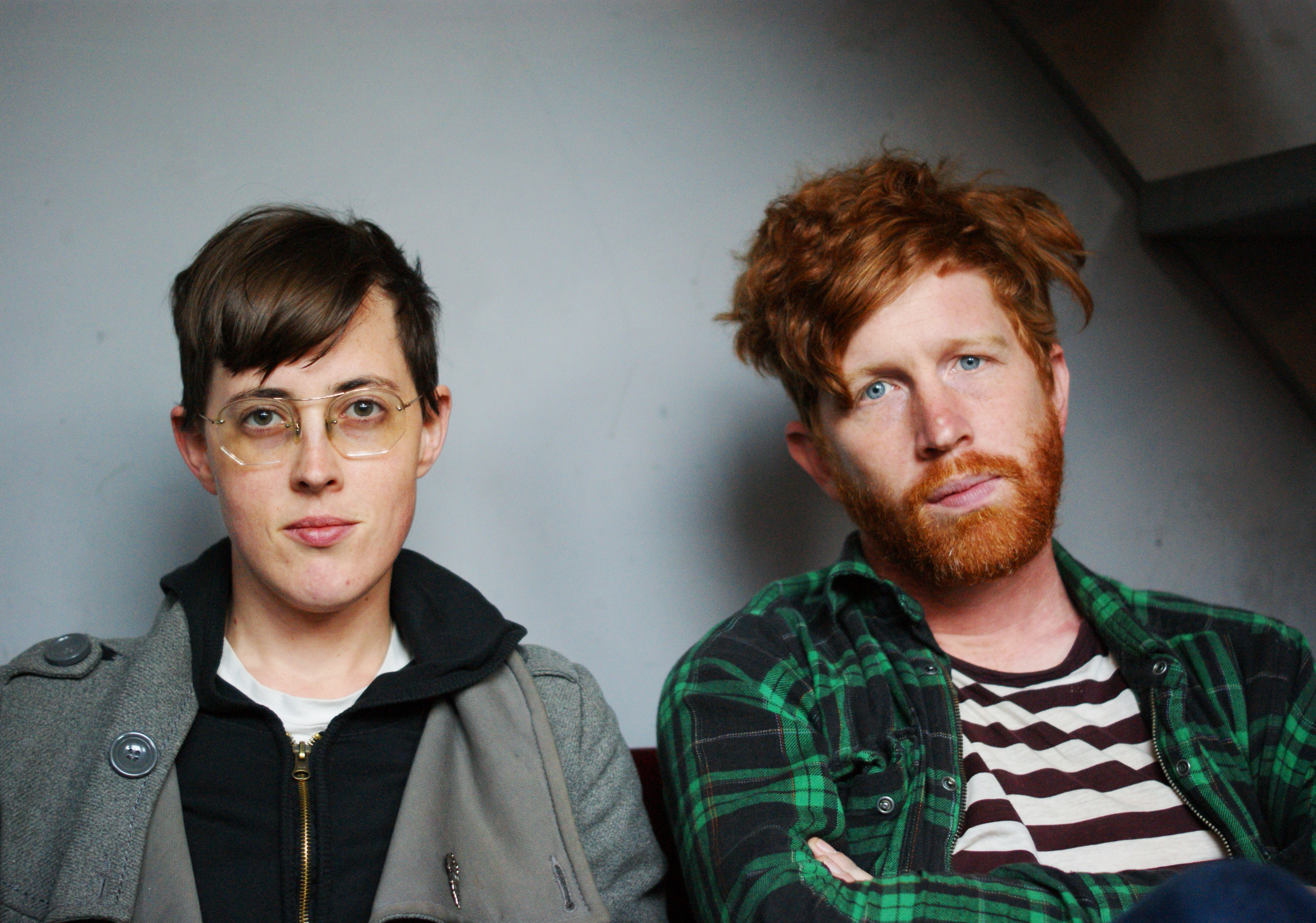

Background information
- Origin: Baltimore, Maryland, United States
- Genres: Indie pop, dream pop, shoegaze
- Years active: 2010–2021
- Labels: Gnomonsong; Ribbon Music; Luco Music Group
- Past members: Jana Hunter; Nate Nelson; Geoff Graham; Walker Teret; Will Adams; Abram Sanders; Carter Tanton; Brandon Davis
- Website: Official website

Lower Dens was an American alternative indie pop band from Baltimore, Maryland, United States. The band was formed in 2010 by Jana Hunter, Geoff Graham, Abram Sanders and Will Adams. Lower Dens has released four albums: their debut on Gnomonsong and a follow-up album on Ribbon Music. Their third album, Escape from Evil, was released on March 31, 2015, on Ribbon Music.

== History ==
=== Formation and Twin-Hand Movement ===
The idea for the band formed when Jana Hunter, at that time performing as a solo artist under his own name, grew tired of touring and decided to take a hiatus from the road. For his final tour before this planned hiatus, he put together a backing band. The enjoyment Hunter got from playing with a band versus performing as a solo artist gave him the idea to form Lower Dens: "During that tour, I realised that it wasn’t the touring life that I hated, but more so that the kind of music I wrote as a solo artist wasn’t something I felt entirely comfortable sharing in a performance setting. Lower Dens then was eventual result of the decision to make music with the specific intention of sharing and enjoying it with others." According to bassist Geoff Graham, the band's creative process starts with Hunter creating "song sketches" which the band finishes together: "Every song is different but we do try to make decisions democratically, and try every idea and then decide by majority what choices we make."

After playing several shows in early 2010, the band released their first album Twin Hand Movement on July 20, 2010, via Gnomonsong. Pitchfork gave the album a rating of 8.1, comparing Hunter's vocals to those of PJ Harvey and Beach House's Victoria Legrand. Dusted Magazine praised the album's lyrics, stating that they are "delivered without irony, yet self-aware enough to appreciate the obviousness."

=== Nootropics and other projects ===
The band began writing their sophomore album while still on tour supporting Twin-Hand Movement. The limitations of writing on the road forced Hunter to work through a laptop and a keyboard rather than the guitar, which led to the increased presence of synths on the album: "I did try to write with a guitar on headphones through a tiny amp plugged into ... the cigarette lighter of the car, but that is an extraordinarily inefficient way to write music ... I talked the band into getting laptop; we got Garage Band and a MIDI digital interface keyboard, and that’s how most of the record was written."

After finishing up touring for Twin-Hand Movement, the band chose to record their followup at The Key Club in Benton Harbor, MI. Hunter cited the studio's location as an imperative part of the recording process: "It's just very simple, and there are farm stands and a beautiful, great lake nearby. Fewer distractions meant more focus ... We slept nights in bunk beds above the studio. It was, in many ways, perfect." Graham noted the amount of time spent in the studio as another important factor: "We had a month of working 7 days a week, living in the studio we were recording in ... we had time to add all these extra dimensions and it made things lusher and thicker." In an interview with Stereogum, Hunter listed Kraftwerk's Radio-Activity, Fripp & Eno, and David Bowie's production on Iggy Pop's The Idiot as major influences during the writing and recording periods.

Nootropics was released on April 30, 2012, via Domino Recording Company's Ribbon Music. The album received positive reviews from major publications including Pitchfork, Rolling Stone, and Spin. Joe Colly of Pitchfork praised the album's first single "Brains" for adding "krautrock and electronic touches to the group's signature guitar swirl" and suggesting "a new dimension and a new confidence" for the band.

In April 2013, the band opened for Beach House and Yo La Tengo at the Baltimore stop of the latter's Fade tour. In May 2013, the band released a new song called "Non Grata" via a split 7-inch with fellow Baltimore Band Horse Lords. The 7-inch was released as a part of the Famous Class LAMC series, which benefits the VH1 Save The Music Foundation.

=== Escape from Evil ===
On January 29, 2015, Lower Dens announced their third album Escape from Evil, which was released on March 31, 2015, via Ribbon Music.

=== The Competition ===
On May 30, 2019, Lower Dens announced their fourth album The Competition. It was released on September 6, 2019, via Ribbon Music. Slant Magazine observed the influence of Depeche Mode and OMD.

=== Breakup ===
On December 8, 2021, Lower Dens announced their breakup. “It’s time for me and Nate to say goodbye to Lower Dens,” Hunter wrote, referring to bandmate and drummer Nate Nelson. “We’re proud of what we’ve done, and very lucky to have had so many people supporting us. Spiritually and physically, we, like, can not participate in the music industry any longer.”

== Discography ==
=== Albums ===
- Twin-Hand Movement (2010)
- Nootropics (2012)
- Escape from Evil (2015)
- The Competition (2019)

=== Singles ===
- "Non Grata" (2013)
- "Real Thing" (2016)
- "Young Republicans" (2019)
