= Niño Rojo =

Studio album by Devendra Banhart
- Released: September 13, 2004
- Genre: Indie folk, psychedelic folk, freak folk, acoustic
- Length: 45:05
- Label: Young God
- Producer: Devendra Banhart, Michael Gira

Devendra Banhart chronology
Rejoicing in the Hands (2004)	Niño Rojo (2004)	Cripple Crow (2005)

Singles from Niño Rojo
- 1. "Little Yellow Spider" Released: 2004; 2. "At the Hop" Released: 2004

Niño Rojo is the fourth studio release by freak folk artist Devendra Banhart and his third release on the label Young God Records. It was released on September 13, 2004.

In 2007, the song "Little Yellow Spider" was used in a commercial for Orange mobile phone services and in 2005 the song "At The Hop" was featured in a commercial for Cathedral City cheese and in Fat Tire Beer's "Follow your Folly" commercial.

In 2006 the album has received a silver certification from Independent Music Companies Association for 30,000+ copies sold in Europe.

== Reception ==
Professional ratings
Aggregate scores
Source	Rating
Metacritic	82/100
Review scores
Source	Rating
AllMusic	4/5 stars
Blender	3/5 stars
Houston Chronicle	4/5
The Irish Times	4/5 stars
Mojo	4/5 stars
NME	7/10
Pitchfork	8.0/10
Q	4/5 stars
Rolling Stone	3/5 stars
Uncut	3/5 stars

At Metacritic, which assigns a normalised rating out of 100 to reviews from mainstream critics, Niño Rojo received an average score of 82, based on 18 reviews, indicating "universal acclaim".

== Track listing ==
No.	Title	Length
1.	"Wake Up, Little Sparrow" (Ella Jenkins cover)	2:54
2.	"Ay Mama"	3:01
3.	"We All Know"	2:46
4.	"Little Yellow Spider"	3:39
5.	"A Ribbon"	2:39
6.	"At the Hop" [Written by Banhart/Cabic]"	2:14
7.	"My Ships"	1:37
8.	"Noah"	2:29
9.	"Sister"	2:38
10.	"Water May Walk"	3:14
11.	"HorseheadedfleshWizard"	2:25
12.	"An Island"	2:04
13.	"Be Kind"	3:05
14.	"Owl Eyes"	2:45
15.	"The Good Red Road"	2:04
16.	"Electric Heart"	5:32

== Personnel ==
- Devendra Banhart - guitar (acoustic, electric), vocals, producer, artwork
- Doug Anderson - mastering, mixing
- Lynn Bridges - engineer
- Michael Gira - harmonica, vocals, producer
- Thor Harris - percussion
- Julia Kent - cello
- Jason LaFarge - vocals, engineer
- Joe McGinty - piano, keyboards
- Steve Moses - percussion, trombone
- Siobhan - vocals
- David Smith - trumpet
- Lauren Dukoff - flute
- Andy Cabic - backing vocals on "At the Hop"

== Chart performance ==
Chart (2004)	Peak position
French Albums Chart	166
