= Nootropics (album) =

Studio album by Lower Dens
- Released: April 30, 2012
- Genre: Indie rock, dream pop, krautrock
- Length: 50:21
- Language: English
- Label: Ribbon Music

Lower Dens chronology
Twin Hand Movement (2010)	Nootropics (2012)	Escape from Evil (2015)

Professional ratings
Review scores
Source	Rating
AllMusic	4/5 stars
The A.V. Club	(B)
Pitchfork	(8.2/10)
Rolling Stone	3.5/5 stars
Spin	8/10 stars

Nootropics is the second album released by Baltimore indie rock band Lower Dens. It was released April 30, 2012, on the Domino Recording Company’s Ribbon Music label, the band's first album on that label, its debut Twin-Hand Movement being released on Gnomonsong.

Nootropics was recorded at the Key Club Recording Company in Benton Harbor, Michigan. It was produced by Drew Brown, an engineer who had assisted Nigel Godrich on several projects.

The second track "Brains" was released as a single ahead of the album, and highlighted that week by Stereogum.

== Track listing ==
1. "Alphabet Song" – 5:28
2. "Brains" – 5:07
3. "Stem" – 2:06
4. "Propagation" – 4:59
5. "Lamb" – 3:43
6. "Candy" – 3:20
7. "Lion in Winter, Pt. 1" – 4:16
8. "Lion in Winter, Pt. 2" – 3:36
9. "Nova Anthem" – 5:28
10. "In the End Is the Beginning" – 12:18

== Personnel ==
- Will Adams – Guitar
- Geoff Graham – Bass, vocals
- Jana Hunter– Vocals, guitar, synths
- Nate Nelson – Drums
- Carter Tanton – Synths, guitar, vocals

The album was produced, engineered, and mixed by Drew Brown, with additional engineering by Bill Skibbe and Jessica Ruffins. "Lamb" was engineered and mixed by Claudius Mittendorfer. Album artwork and design was done by Rose Chase with photographs by Jana Hunter and Sean Donnola.
