= Smokey Rolls Down Thunder Canyon =

Studio album by Devendra Banhart
- Released: September 25, 2007
- Genre: Indie folk, psychedelic folk, naturalismo, folk rock
- Length: 72:19
- Label: XL Recordings

Devendra Banhart chronology
Cripple Crow (2005)	Smokey Rolls Down Thunder Canyon (2007)	What Will We Be (2009)

Singles from Smokey Rolls Down Thunder Canyon
- 1. "Carmensita" Released: 2007; 2. "Lover" Released: 2007

Professional ratings
Review scores
Source	Rating
AllMusic	4/5 stars
NME	link
Pitchfork	(6.5/10) link
Rockfeedback	link
Rolling Stone	link
Time Off	link
Tiny Mix Tapes	link
Twisted Ear	link
Uncut	preview link
Robert Christgau	link

Smokey Rolls Down Thunder Canyon is a Devendra Banhart album released September 25, 2007. This album features more instrumentation than the previous records, as well as more genre experimentation. Smokey Rolls Down Thunder Canyon was recorded in Topanga Canyon in Southern California and is dedicated to Alice Coltrane, Malachi Ritscher and Elliott Smith. Smith's recording studio New Monkey is also thanked in the liner notes.

The majority of the merchandise sold on the US tour for the album was made in collaboration with Banhart by Adam Tullie and Angeline Rivas, who design the clothing line Cavern Collection.

Smokey Rolls Down Thunder Canyon reached #19 on Rolling Stone's list of the Top 50 Albums of 2007. The song "Seahorse" is #69 on Rolling Stone's list of the 100 Best Songs of 2007.

== Background ==
The album details Banhart's break-up with Bianca Casady of the band CocoRosie. Their relationship ended in 2006.

== Track listing ==
No.	Title	Length
1.	"Cristobal" (with Gael García Bernal)	4:30
2.	"So Long Old Bean"	2:56
3.	"Samba Vexillographica" (with Chris Robinson of The Black Crowes)	4:49
4.	"Seahorse"	8:04
5.	"Bad Girl"	4:48
6.	"Seaside"	4:36
7.	"Shabop Shalom" (with Nick Valensi of The Strokes)	4:38
8.	"Tonada Yanomaminista"	2:56
9.	"Rosa" (with Rodrigo Amarante of Los Hermanos)	5:08
10.	"Saved"	5:33
11.	"Lover"	3:43
12.	"Carmensita" (with Natalie Portman in the video)	4:49
13.	"The Other Woman"	3:49
14.	"Freely" (with Linda Perhacs)	4:59
15.	"I Remember"	4:25
16.	"My Dearest Friend" (with Vashti Bunyan)	2:36

== Personnel ==
The current name of Banhart's band is Spiritual Bonerz (the 'z' is silent). The line-up consists of:

- Devendra Banhart
- Noah Georgeson
- Luckey Remington
- Pete Newsom
- Greg Rogove
- Rodrigo Amarante
- Andy Cabic

Additional musicians

- Mike Davis - trumpet
- Noah Gladstone - trombone
- Amy Tatum - flutes, tenor saxophone

== Chart performance ==
Chart (2007)	Peak position
Belgian Albums (Ultratop Flanders)	39
French Albums (SNEP)	42
UK Albums (OCC)	93
US Billboard 200	115
US Heatseekers Albums (Billboard)	3
US Indie Store Album Sales (Billboard)	11
