= The Charles C. Leary =

Studio album by Devendra Banhart
- Released: August 8, 2002
- Length: 52:55
- Label: Hinah

Devendra Banhart chronology
The Charles C. Leary (2002)	Oh Me Oh My (2002)

The Charles C. Leary is the first studio album by Devendra Banhart. It was released on August 8, 2002, through the label Hinah.

== Track listing ==
No.	Title	Length
1.	"Bish-Bash Falls"	2:33
2.	"Soothe My Soul, Mend My Mind"	0:47
3.	"Sarah Sings"	0:12
4.	"Mmplushumblehorse"	3:17
5.	"Michigan State"	3:52
6.	"Rainwater Pigfarmers"	0:13
7.	"Aymama-Aymama"	2:53
8.	"The Charles C. Leary"	2:53
9.	"Whistling"	1:27
10.	"The Thumbs Touch Too Much"	2:06
11.	"Todo Los Dolores"	2:45
12.	"Catastrophie"	1:54
13.	"Me And Andy Singing El Rio"	0:47
14.	"The Fish Are Scratched Up Flies"	0:45
15.	"Artsandcrafts (Live at 40th St W.)"	3:22
16.	"The Animal Map"	2:43
17.	"Cada Casa Que Crece"	2:43
18.	"Ride Away Like Roy Orbison"	4:40
19.	"Red Lagoon Whistling"	1:28
20.	"Noah"	1:47
21.	"Cosmos and Damien"	3:10
22.	"Aperpareplane (Early Recording)"	2:53
23.	"I Played Organ While Colter Played Guitar"	2:07
24.	"Joe Cain"	1:09

== Personnel ==
- Devendra Banhart
- Colter Jacobson – guitar on "I Played Organ While Colter Played Guitar"
- Sarah Cain – vocals on track "Joe Cain"
