= Serigne Mbaye (chef) =

American chef, restauranteur (born 1994)

- Born: 1994 (age 31–32); Harlem
- Education: New England Culinary Institute
- Culinary career
- Current restaurant: Dakar NOLA
- Awards won: James Beard Award for Best Chef (South) (2026); Time 100 Next (2024); James Beard Award for Best New Restaurant (2024); Nomination: James Beard Award for Best Emerging Chef (2023); Nomination: James Beard Award for Best Emerging Chef (2022); Eater NOLA Chef of the Year (2021)

Serigne Mbaye (born 1994) is a Senegalese-American chef and restauranteur best known for his Senegalese-Creole restaurant Dakar NOLA, which is located in New Orleans. He won the James Beard Award for Best New Restaurant in 2024 and was named to the Time 100 Next list that same year. He was awarded the James Beard Award for Best Chef (South) in 2026.

== Biography ==
Mbaye was born in Harlem, New York, to a mother who was a restauranteur. He attended a Muslim boarding school in Dakar, Senegal, where his family was from, starting at the age of 5. The first dish he learned how to make was a traditional Senegalese Lakh, which he learned at the age of 9.

At around 14 or 15, he moved back to New York and started working at a restaurant called The Harrison. Soon, he attended culinary school at the New England Culinary Institute in Vermont. He then began working at Commander's Palace after meeting people at the airport who put him in touch with the executive chef. He became Sous Chef for Cafe Adelaide, before working at Atelier Crenn and L'Atelier de Joël Robuchon between 2018 and 2020. He first launched his restaurant, Dakar, a restaurant focused on seafood and utilizing both Senegalese and Creole flavors, as a popup over the pandemic, and opened it as a brick and mortar store in 2022 with the help of business partner Effie Richardson. He has stated his goal is to make Senegalese cuisine notable on the global stage. In June 2026, it moved to a larger location.

He was named Eater NOLA's Chef of the Year in 2021, and was named a nominee for the James Beard Award for Best Emerging Chef in 2022 and 2023. His restaurant Dakar won the James Beard Award for Best New Restaurant in 2024. He was named in the Time 100 Next in 2024: his profile was written by Kwame Onwuachi. He then became a semifinalist for Best Chef (South) in the James Beard Award in 2026, and went on to win the award.

He will be participating in the Chef's Table Festival in Utah in the summer of 2026.
