= To Find Me Gone =

Studio album by Vetiver
- Released: May 19, 2006
- Genre: Folk rock
- Label: Dicristina Stair Builders; FatCat
- Producer: Andy Cabic, Thom Monahan

Vetiver chronology
Vetiver (2004)	To Find Me Gone (2006)	Thing of the Past (2008)

Professional ratings
Review scores
Source	Rating
AllMusic	3.5/5 stars
Pitchfork	7.3/10
PopMatters	6/10
Slant	3/5 stars

To Find Me Gone is the second studio album by Andy Cabic's San Francisco based band Vetiver. The cover features a holographic print from American Artist Galen Pehrson.

== Track listing ==
1. "Been So Long" – 3:58
2. "You May Be Blue" – 4:41
3. "No One Word" – 6:13
4. "Idle Ties" – 4:33
5. "I Know No Pardon" – 6:53
6. "Maureen" – 3:32
7. "The Porter" – 2:18
8. "Double" – 5:13
9. "Red Lantern Girls" – 6:49
10. "Lost & Found" (bonus track) – 5:24
11. "Won't Be Me" – 4:22
12. "Busted" (bonus track) – 3:32
13. "Down At El Rio" – 5:16
