= Gavin Kaysen =

American chef

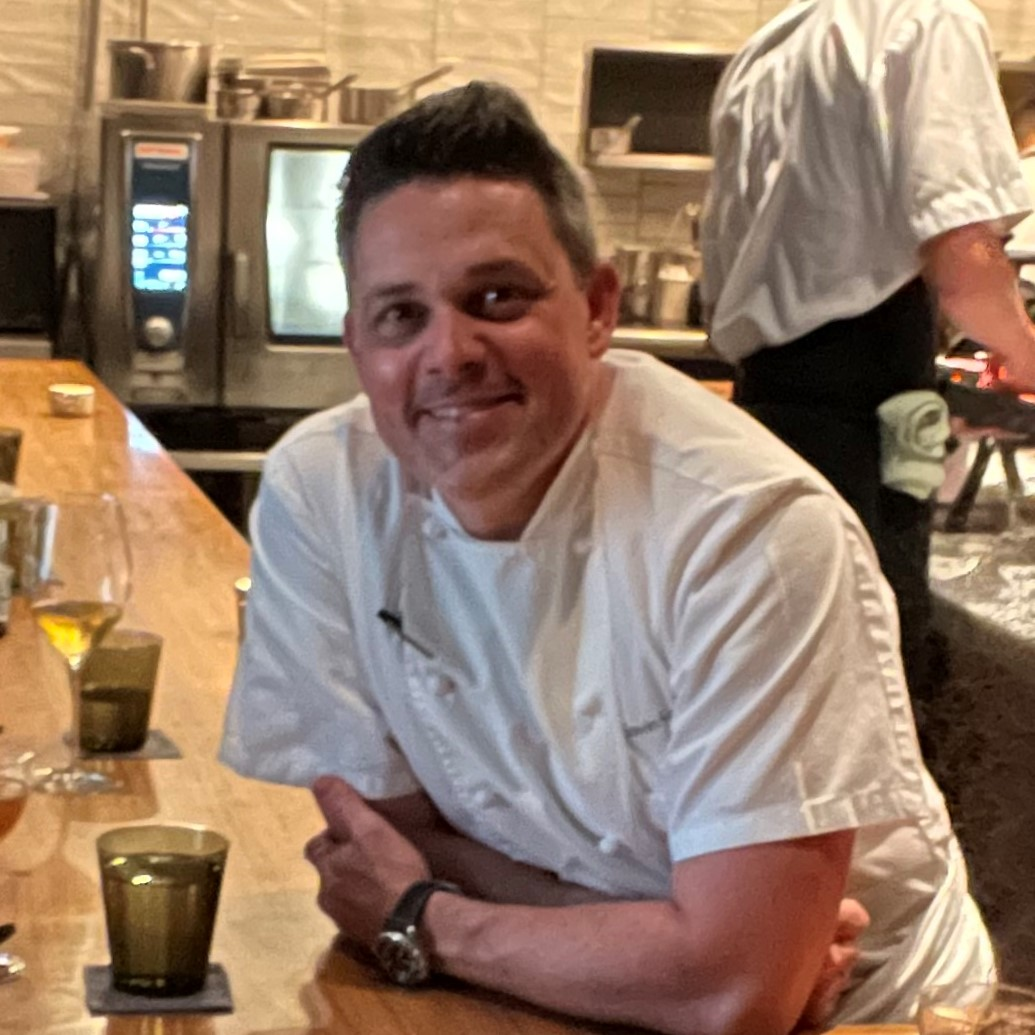
- Chef Kaysen in July 2022
- Born: Thousand Oaks, California
- Education: New England Culinary Institute
- Culinary career
- Cooking style: French, Mediterranean, Contemporary American
- Current restaurant(s): Spoon and Stable, Bellecour Bakery, Demi, Socca, Mara
- Television show(s): The Next Iron Chef, Iron Chef America, Top Chef
- Awards won: James Beard Foundation Award: Rising Star Chef of the Year (2008); Best Chef: Midwest (2018)

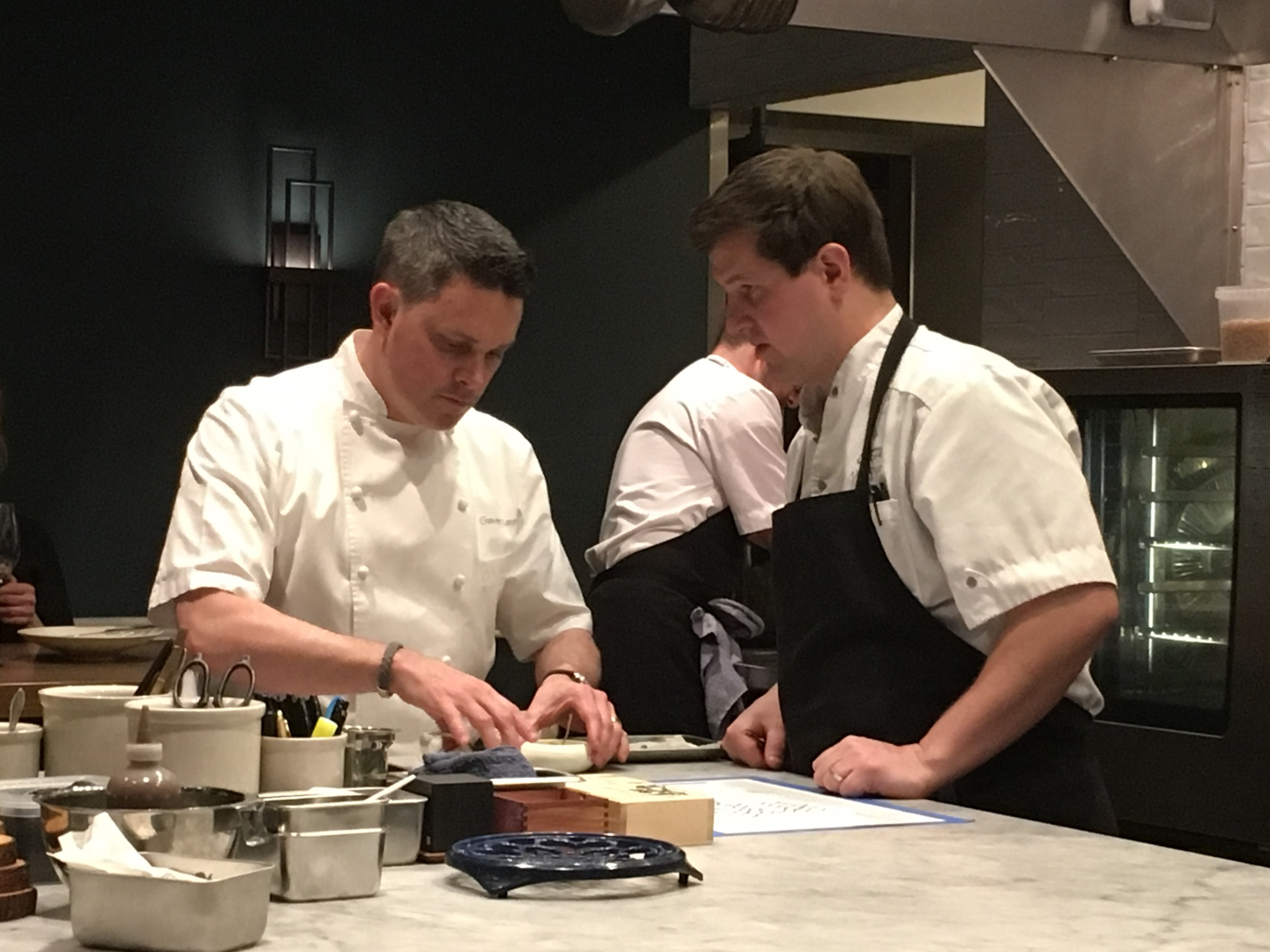
Chef Kaysen preparing food at his restaurant Demi with chef de cuisine Adam Ritter in April 2019.

Gavin Kaysen is the executive chef and owner of Spoon and Stable, Bellecour Bakery, Demi, Socca, and Mara, all in Minneapolis. He is a two time recipient of a James Beard Award, including Best Chef: Midwest in 2018. Previous to his move to Minneapolis, he served as Executive Chef and Director of Culinary Operations for Daniel Boulud in New York City, overseeing Café Boulud in Palm Beach, Toronto and New York City.

He previously headed the kitchen at El Bizcocho in San Diego. In 2007, he represented the U.S.A. at the Bocuse d'Or. He was a competitor on The Next Iron Chef, eliminated during the third challenge, "Resourcefulness".

== Career ==
A graduate of the New England Culinary Institute, Kaysen was inspired to become a chef while working at a Subway in Bloomington, Minnesota.

In 2007, Kaysen was named one of the top 10 ‘Best New Chefs’ by Food & Wine. Before becoming executive chef at Cafe Boulud, he worked at Domaine Chandon in Yountville, California, under Robert Curry, at Auberge de Lavaux in Lausanne, Switzerland, and under Marco Pierre White at L'Escargot in London, England.

Chef Kaysen was eliminated during the third episode of The Next Iron Chef for under-seasoning and under-salting his food, according to the judges. After the elimination, he explained to judge Michael Ruhlman that the problem was that the food had been stored improperly by the tech crew of the show, and had become submerged in an ice water bath, leeching out the salt and seasonings. Ruhlman has stated that had he known of the technical glitch, he would likely have judged differently.

In 2008, Chef Kaysen won a James Beard Foundation Award for Rising Star Chef of the Year.

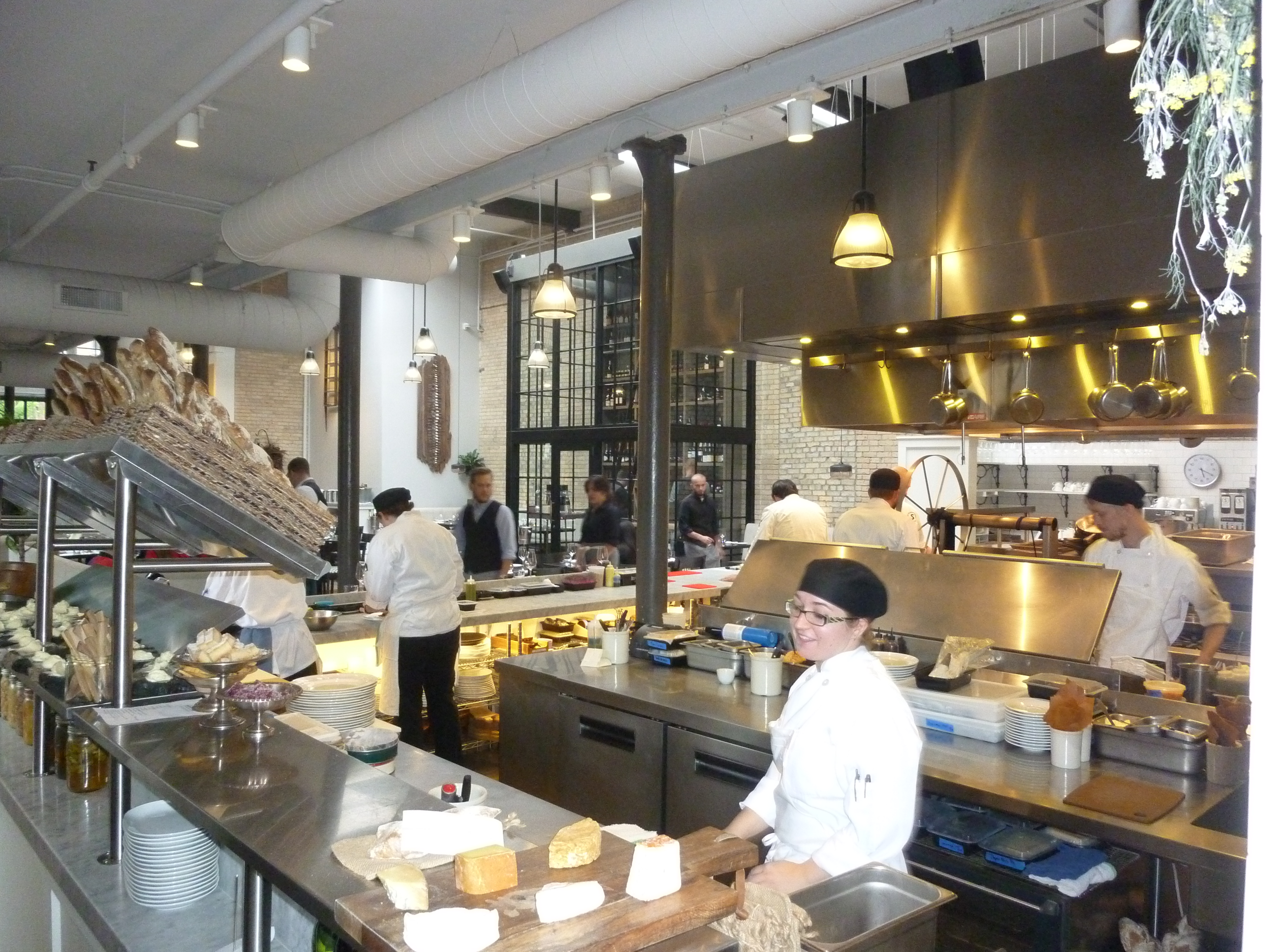
Team USA, including Gavin Kaysen (of Spoon and Stable, kitchen pictured), Thomas Keller and Daniel Boulud, won a silver medal in the 2015 Bocuse d'Or.

Kaysen opened his first restaurant, Spoon and Stable, in the North Loop neighborhood of Minneapolis in November 2014. It was named a 2015 Restaurant of the Year by Food & Wine, a Best New Restaurant by Bon Appétit, and was a 2015 James Beard Award Finalist for Best New Restaurant.

In March of 2017, he opened Bellecour in Wayzata, Minnesota. The restaurant was named for a historic square in Lyon, France, the birthplace of two of his mentors: Daniel Boulud and Paul Bocuse. In 2018, the James Beard Awards named him Best Chef: Midwest. Kaysen closed Bellecour in 2020, citing effects of the COVID-19 pandemic. In November 2025, its bakery component relocated to open in Cooks of Crocus Hill store in Edina, Minnesota. A month later, another Bellecour location opened in North Loop.

Kaysen collaborated with chef Andrew Zimmern in 2017 to form KZ ProVisioning, originally conceived as a collaboration between the NHL's Minnesota Wild and later expanded to include partnerships with the Minnesota Timberwolves and the Minnesota Lynx. Through this program, meals are prepared for professional athletes in accordance with players' physiological needs.

Kaysen opened his third restaurant, the 20-seat tasting menu venue Demi, in 2019. It was a James Beard Award Finalist for Best New Restaurant in 2020.

A virtual cooking class series called GK at Home was created during the winter of 2020, a pivot while his restaurants were closed during the COVID-19 pandemic. It continues to this day.

His fourth restaurant, Mara, serves Mediterranean cuisine and opened in the Four Seasons Hotel Minneapolis alongside Socca, a casual café.

Keysen expanded his culinary footprint at the end of 2025 with the opening of the Merchant Room at the Four Seasons Hotel in Naples, Florida.

Keysen manages all his restaurants through Soigné Hospitality, the restaurant company he opened in 2016.

== Television appearances ==
- The Next Iron Chef, 2007
- Iron Chef America, 2009 - winner
- Top Chef, 2009 (season 6) - guest judge

== Books ==
Kaysen self-published At Home in 2022, a book of 112 recipes based on his online cooking classes.
