= Escape from Evil =

Studio album by Lower Dens
- Released: March 31, 2015
- Genre: Indie rock, indie pop, dream pop, experimental pop
- Length: 41:20
- Label: Ribbon Music
- Producer: Jana Hunter; Chris Coady; John Congleton; Walker Teret; Ariel Rechtshaid

Lower Dens chronology
Nootropics (2012)	Escape from Evil (2015)	The Competition (2019)

Professional ratings
Aggregate scores
Source	Rating
Metacritic	78/100
Review scores
Source	Rating
Consequence of Sound	B-
Drowned in Sound	7/10
Exclaim!	8/10
The Guardian	4/5 stars
The Line of Best Fit	8.5/10
No Ripcord	8/10
Pitchfork	8.3/10
PopMatters	8/10
Tiny Mix Tapes	3.5/5 stars

Escape from Evil is the third studio album by Baltimore indie rock band Lower Dens. It was released in March 2015 under Domino Recording Company's Ribbon Music label. It was produced by the band's lead singer Jana Hunter and Chris Coady.

== Critical reception ==
Stephen Carlick of Exclaim! called the record "the closest thing to pop music they've made yet", praising their push into new sonic territory as "the mark of any great band."

== Track listing ==
No.	Title	Length
1.	"Sucker's Shangri-La"	4:57
2.	"Ondine"	3:06
3.	"To Die in L.A."	4:11
4.	"Quo Vadis"	3:34
5.	"Your Heart Still Beating"	5:26
6.	"Electric Current"	4:08
7.	"I Am the Earth"	5:07
8.	"Non Grata"	2:59
9.	"Company"	4:32
10.	"Société Anonyme"	3:20

== Personnel ==
- Jana Hunter – vocals, producer
- Nate Nelson – drums
- Geoff Graham – bass
- Walker Teret – guitar, additional producing (track 1)
- Chris Coady – producer, mixing
- John Congleton – additional producing (tracks 1, 6), additional recording
- Ariel Rechtshaid – additional producing (track 2)
- Sarah Register – mixing
- Chris Freeland – recording
- Bo Hill – engineer
- David Tolomei – engineer
- Hermonie Williams – cover, artwork
