= Bright Examples =

Studio album by Sarah Lee Guthrie and Johnny Irion
- Released: 22 February 2011
- Recorded: 2011
- Studio: Dreamland (Hurley, New York)
- Genre: Folk, americana
- Length: 40:40
- Label: Ninth Street Opus
- Producer: Andy Cabic, Thom Monahan

Sarah Lee Guthrie and Johnny Irion chronology
Go Waggaloo (2009)	Bright Examples (2011)

Bright Examples is the fifth studio album by husband and wife duo Sarah Lee Guthrie & Johnny Irion. Their previous album Go Waggaloo was recorded for children, so Bright Examples is their first release in the folk and Americana genre. The collaborative project features producers Andy Cabic (lead singer-songwriter in the band Vetiver) and Thom Monahan (Devendra Banhart, Vetiver).

== Track listing ==
All songs by Johnny Irion except "Seven Sisters" and "Butterflies" by Sarah Lee Guthrie.

Bright Examples track listing
No.	Title	Length
1.	"Ahead of Myself"	3:11
2.	"Never Far From Hear"	3:00
3.	"Speed of Light"	2:49
4.	"Seven Sisters"	3:05
5.	"Target on Your Heart"	3:31
6.	"Hurry Up and Wait"	4:16
7.	"Dupont Circle"	3:01
8.	"Butterflies"	3:55
9.	"First Snow"	2:58
10.	"Cry Quieter"	3:19
11.	"Company I'm Keepin"	3:08
12.	"Bright Examples"	4:27

== Personnel ==
- Johnny Irion – vocals, guitar, piano
- Sarah Lee Guthrie – vocals, guitars, percussion
- Andy Cabic – vocals, guitar
- Neal Casal – guitar, piano
- Gary Louris – vocals
- Otto Houser – drums, percussion
- Kevin Barker – guitar
- Daniel Hindman – bass
- Charlie Rose – guitar, steel, cello
- Radoslav Lorković – organ, piano, Wurly
- Mark Olson – vocals
- Ken Mauri – piano

Technical personnel

- Producer – Andy Cabic, Thom Monahan
- Recorded at – Dreamland Studios (West Hurley, NY)
- Mixed at – The Hangar by Thom Monahan
- Mastered by – JJ Golden at Golden Mastering
- Mastering Engineer – Greg Calbi
- Photos by – Neal Casal
- Design by – Marc Harkness
