= New England Culinary Institute =

American culinary college

Coordinates: 44.2598397°N 72.5600889°W

- Motto: Learn it by living it
- Type: Private for-profit culinary school
- Active: June 15, 1980–March 2020
- Location: Montpelier, Vermont, U.S.
- Colors: Maroon and White
- Website: www.neci.edu

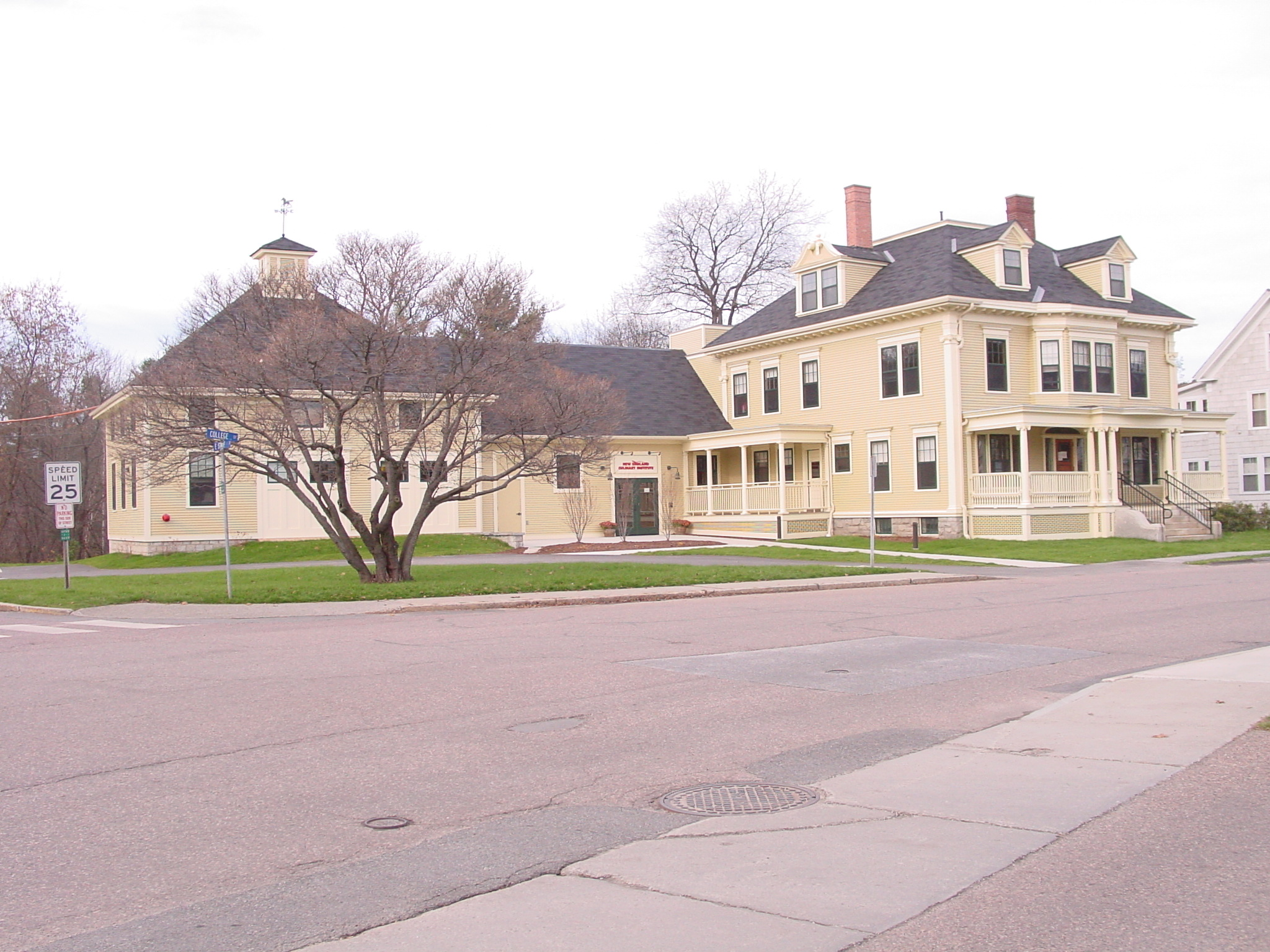
New England Culinary Institute, Harris Hall

The New England Culinary Institute (NECI) was a private for-profit culinary school in Montpelier, Vermont. It was open for 40 years before shutting down as result of the COVID-19 pandemic.

== History ==
NECI was founded on June 15, 1980, by Fran Voigt and John Dranow. The first NECI class, conducted by Chef Michel LeBorgne, had seven students. The enrollment rose to approximately 800 in 1999, but fell to 500 in 2015 and to around 300 at the beginning of 2017. A second campus was operated in Essex, Vermont, from August 1989 through August 2009.

The institute ran a number of restaurants in Montpelier, and also provided food service for Vermont College and National Life. It was accredited by the Accrediting Commission of Career Schools and Colleges.

By the 2010s, enrollment in culinary institutes in the United States was in decline, and culinary programs nationwide were closing.

=== Closure ===
In December 2020, because of the pandemic, NECI had to close. Alumnus Alton Brown, students, faculty and other staff had just celebrated the 40th anniversary of the institution's start.

The institute discontinued all credit-bearing academic programs in the summer of 2021. The institution's official statement about the closing stated that "the pandemic proved to be the burden that we could not overcome. As directed by the State of Vermont we closed all our retail operations in March 2020, which severely limited our ability to continue to deliver a college level, hands on culinary education, on an economically viable basis."

== Academics ==
The institute offered the following credentials:

- Certificate in Professional Cooking
- Certificate in Professional Baking and Pastry
- Associate in Occupational Studies
- Bachelor of Arts

== Notable alumni ==
- Amanda Chantal Bacon – American entrepreneur
- Serigne Mbaye – Senegalese-American chef and restauranteur.
- Alton Brown – TV host of various cooking shows
- Paul Hogan – Former Australian Consul turned celebrity butler
- Gavin Kaysen – chef de cuisine of Cafe Boulud in New York City
- Herbert Stockschlaeder II - Certified Research Chef and Director of Research & Development at Rosina Food Products
