= Hu Hu Hu =

Studio album by Natalia Lafourcade
- Released: 19 May 2009
- Genres: Latin pop; pop rock; bossa nova; alternative pop
- Length: 53:14
- Languages: Spanish; English
- Label: Sony
- Producers: Emmanuel del Real, Marco Moreno y Neto

Natalia Lafourcade chronology
Las 4 Estaciones del Amor (2008)	Hu Hu Hu (2009)	Mujer Divina – Homenaje a Agustín Lara (2012)

Singles from Hu Hu Hu
- 1. "Azul" Released: 2009; 2. "Ella es bonita" Released: 2009; 3. "Cursis Melodias" Released: 2009; 4. "No Viniste" Released: 2010

Hu Hu Hu is the third album by Mexican singer-songwriter Natalia Lafourcade, released on 19 May 2009 by Sony Music. After releasing her album Casa as Natalia and la Forquetina, she took a hiatus from performing. She returned to music with the release of the instrumental EP, Las 4 Estaciones del Amor in 2008. Lafourcade decided to name the album "Hu Hu Hu" because she perceived the phrase to be "an expression of joy".

The album was produced by Emmanuel del Real, Marco Moreno, and Ernesto García. The album was nominated for Best Female Pop Vocal Album at the 2009 Latin Grammy Awards (won by Laura Pausini) and Best Latin Pop album at the 2010 Grammy Awards (won by La Quinta Estación). Club Fonograma also named the album the 2nd best of 2009, and the 7th best of the decade.

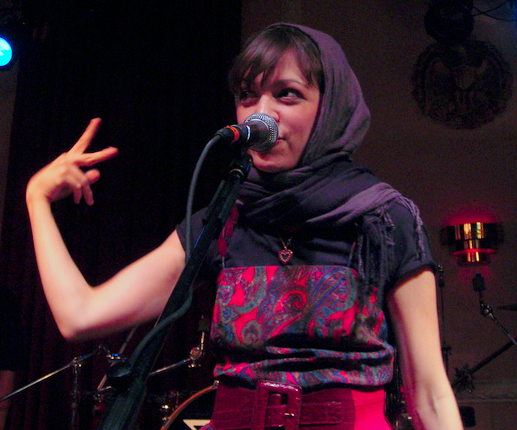
Natalia Lafourcade performing in 2009

== CD artwork ==
The cover showed Lafourcade wearing a large headpiece of a lynx's head. Animals were featured elsewhere in the artwork and promotional materials. An owl was featured on her Myspace page and a lynx on her YouTube channel. Federico Escoto and Roberto Carrara designed the artwork.

=== Singles ===
The first official single entitled "Ella Es Bonita" was advertised on radio and television stations beginning in March 2009. The video was recorded in Monterrey. The second single is "Cursis Melodías".

Lafourcade posted demos of some of the album's songs and interviews on radio stations on her MySpace page.

"No Viniste" is the third single, released at the same time as the album re-release in 2010; the video was released on 10 August that year.

== Track listing ==
All tracks are written by Natalia Lafourcade, except "Tolas Melodías", written by Sinamantes.

No.	Title	Length
1.	"Cursis Melodías"	4:28
2.	"No Viniste"	4:05
3.	"Siempre Prisa"	4:54
4.	"Tiempo Al Viento"	4:49
5.	"Let's Get Out"	4:01
6.	"Hu Hu Hu" (feat. Julieta Venegas)	2:41
7.	"Ella Es Bonita"	3:15
8.	"Niño Hojas"	2:49
9.	"Running Too Fast"	2:55
10.	"Azul"	6:33
11.	"Hora de Compartir"	3:45
12.	"Un Lugar Para Renacer"	4:30
13.	"Look Outside" (feat. Juan Son)	4:24

Japan Version
No.	Title	Length
14.	"Hu Hu Hu (Demo)" (Demo)	2:39
15.	"Tiempo Al Viento" (Demo)	4:50

Hu Hu Hu (Edición Especial)
No.	Title	Length
1.	"Niño Hojas" (Live)	5:47
2.	"Hu Hu Hu" (feat. Carla Morrison) (Live)	3:03
3.	"Un Lugar Para Renacer" (Live)	4:41
4.	"Azul" (Live)	8:44
5.	"Look Outside" (Live)	7:37
6.	"Cursis Melodías"	4:26
7.	"No Viniste"	4:05
8.	"Siempre Prisa"	4:53
9.	"Tiempo Al Viento"	4:49
10.	"Let's Get Out"	4:00
11.	"Ella Es Bonita"	3:14
12.	"Running Too Fast"	2:55
13.	"Tolas Melodías" (Cursis Melodías [Versión Portugués])	5:00
14.	"No Viniste" (Panoctica Orchestra Remix)	3:47
15.	"Todo Lo Que Tengo Es Real"	2:26
16.	"Tiempo Al Viento" (feat. Lo Blondo)	6:41

iTunes Bonus Track
No.	Title	Length
1.	"Niño Hojas" (Live)	5:47
2.	"Hu Hu Hu" (feat. Carla Morrison Live)	3:03
3.	"Un Lugar Para Renacer" (Live)	4:41
4.	"Azul" (Live)	8:44
5.	"Look Outside" (Live)	7:37
6.	"Cursis Melodías"	4:26
7.	"No Viniste"	4:05
8.	"Siempre Prisa"	4:53
9.	"Tiempo Al Viento"	4:49
10.	"Let's Get Out"	4:00
11.	"Ella Es Bonita"	3:14
12.	"Running Too Fast"	2:55
13.	"Tolas Melodías" (Cursis Melodías [Versión Portugués])	5:00
14.	"No Viniste" (Panoctica Orchestra Remix)	3:47
15.	"Todo Lo Que Tengo Es Real"	2:26
16.	"Tiempo Al Viento" (feat. Lo Blondo)	6:41
17.	"Cursis melodías" (DJ Pho Remix)	4:35
18.	"Let's Get Out" (Video live)
19.	"Azul" (Video live)
20.	"Look Outside" (Video live)
21.	"Azul" (Music video)	4:56
22.	"Ella Es Bonita" (Music video)	3:17
23.	"Cursis Melodías" (Music video)	4:35

DVD Hu Hu Hu (Edición Especial)
No.	Title	Length
1.	"Niño Hojas" (Video live)
2.	"Hu Hu Hu" (Video live)
3.	"Un Día Para Renacer" (Video live)
4.	"Azul" (Video live)
5.	"Look Outside" (Video live)
6.	"Azul" (Music video)	4:56
7.	"Ella Es Bonita" (Music video)	3:17
8.	"Cursis Melodías" (Music video)	4:35
9.	"Hu Hu Hu Documantal"
10.	"14 Días En Japón"

Note The special edition album features 16 songs, including remixes and live songs with guest artists, recorded at the Teatro Fru Fru of Mexico City.

== Charts ==
Chart performance for Hu Hu Hu
Chart (2009)	Peak position
Mexican Albums (AMPROFON)	9

== Certifications ==
Region	Certification	Certified units/sales
Mexico (AMPROFON)	Gold	40,000^{‡}
^{‡} Sales+streaming figures based on certification alone.
