= Amanda Chantal Bacon =

American entrepreneur

- Born: New York City, US
- Education: New England Culinary Institute
- Occupations: Entrepreneur; Lifestyle influencer
- Known for: Moon Juice
- Notable work: The Moon Juice Cookbook
- Spouse: Gregory Rogove
- Children: 2

Amanda Chantal Bacon is an American entrepreneur, cookbook author, and wellness influencer. Originally from New York, Bacon founded the juice and beauty products company Moon Juice in 2012. The company's items are sold in multiple locations and its supplements are available in the United States and Canada at retailers such as Sephora.

Moon Juice is reported to have over $20 million in annual sales and has celebrity fans such as Gwyneth Paltrow, Zoë Kravitz, and Shailene Woodley.

== Career ==
Bacon graduated from the New England Culinary Institute in Vermont and moved to Los Angeles to work as a chef at the restaurant Lucques. She opened her first Moon Juice shop in 2012. By 2015, she had three locations of the store.

Bacon published a cookbook, The Moon Juice Cookbook, in September 2016.

In 2018, Bacon launched a line of beauty products under the Moon Juice name.

In 2021, Moon Juice was reported to have hired a management consultant to explore mergers and acquisitions options.

== Personal life ==
Amanda Chantal Bacon grew up in New York City and is the daughter of Chantal Bacon, who was partner and CEO of American fashion mogul Betsey Johnson.

Bacon is married to drummer Gregory Rogove, has two children, and lives in the Rustic Canyon neighborhood of Los Angeles, California.
