= What Will We Be =

Studio album by Devendra Banhart
- Released: October 27, 2009
- Genres: Folk, freak folk, naturalismo
- Length: 50:31
- Labels: Reprise, Warner Bros.
- Producers: Paul Butler, Devendra Banhart

Devendra Banhart chronology
Smokey Rolls Down Thunder Canyon (2007)	What Will We Be (2009)	Mala (2013)

Professional ratings
Aggregate scores
Source	Rating
Metacritic	69/100
Review scores
Source	Rating
AllMusic	4/5 stars
The A.V. Club	(A−)
Drowned In Sound	(4/10)
Los Angeles Times	3.5/4 stars
PopMatters	6/10 stars
Pitchfork	(4.0/10)
Rolling Stone	3.5/5 stars
Spin	3.5/5 stars
Uncut	3/5 stars

What Will We Be is Devendra Banhart's seventh studio album released on October 27, 2009, on Warner Bros. Records. The album was co-produced by Banhart and Paul Butler from A Band of Bees. Rejoining Banhart are old bandmates Noah Georgeson, Greg Rogove, Luckey Remington, and Rodrigo Amarante, all of whom worked with him on his previous album, Smokey Rolls Down Thunder Canyon.

The composition "Maria Lionza" is an "evocation to the goddess."

== Critical reception ==
What Will We Be was met with "generally favorable" reviews from critics. At Metacritic, which assigns a weighted average rating out of 100 to reviews from mainstream publications, this release received an average score of 69, based on 25 reviews.

== Track listing ==
No.	Title	Length
1.	"Can't Help But Smiling"	2:24
2.	"Angelika"	3:23
3.	"Baby"	3:06
4.	"Goin' Back"	3:44
5.	"First Song for B"	3:00
6.	"Last Song for B"	3:02
7.	"Chin Chin & Muck Muck"	5:25
8.	"16th & Valencia, Roxy Music"	3:00
9.	"Rats"	5:08
10.	"Maria Lionza"	5:51
11.	"Brindo"	3:42
12.	"Meet Me at Lookout Point"	3:40
13.	"Walilamdzi"	2:11
14.	"Foolin'"	2:43
15.	"Welcome to the Island" (Bonus track)	2:47
16.	"Pray for the Other Person's Happiness" (Bonus track)	3:44

== Chart performance ==
=== Album charts ===
Chart (2009)	Peak position
French Albums Chart	116
UK Albums Chart	109
U.S. Billboard 200	139
U.S. Folk Albums	8
U.S. Top Heatseekers	4
