= The Black Babies =

EP by Devendra Banhart
- Released: May 19, 2003
- Recorded: 2003
- Length: 23:44
- Label: Young God

Devendra Banhart chronology
| Oh Me Oh My (2002) | The Black Babies (2003) | Rejoicing in the Hands (2004) |

Professional ratings
Review scores
| Source | Rating |
|---|---|
| Pitchfork | (7.7/10) |
| Tiny Mix Tapes | 4.5/5 stars |
| Uncut | 2/5 stars |

The Black Babies is the first EP recorded by the folk rock artist Devendra Banhart. It was released only in the United Kingdom through Young God's UK distributor, Cargo UK, on May 19, 2003.

== Track listing ==
| No. | Title | Length |
|---|---|---|
| 1. | "Bluebird" | 1:25 |
| 2. | "Surgery I Stole" | 3:35 |
| 3. | "Cosmos and Demos" | 3:34 |
| 4. | "Onward the Indian" | 2:50 |
| 5. | "Lagoon" | 2:24 |
| 6. | "The Charles C. Leary" | 2:48 |
| 7. | "Long Song" | 2:26 |
| 8. | "Old Thunderbird" | 4:38 |
