= Emmanuel del Real =

Mexican musician (born 1969)

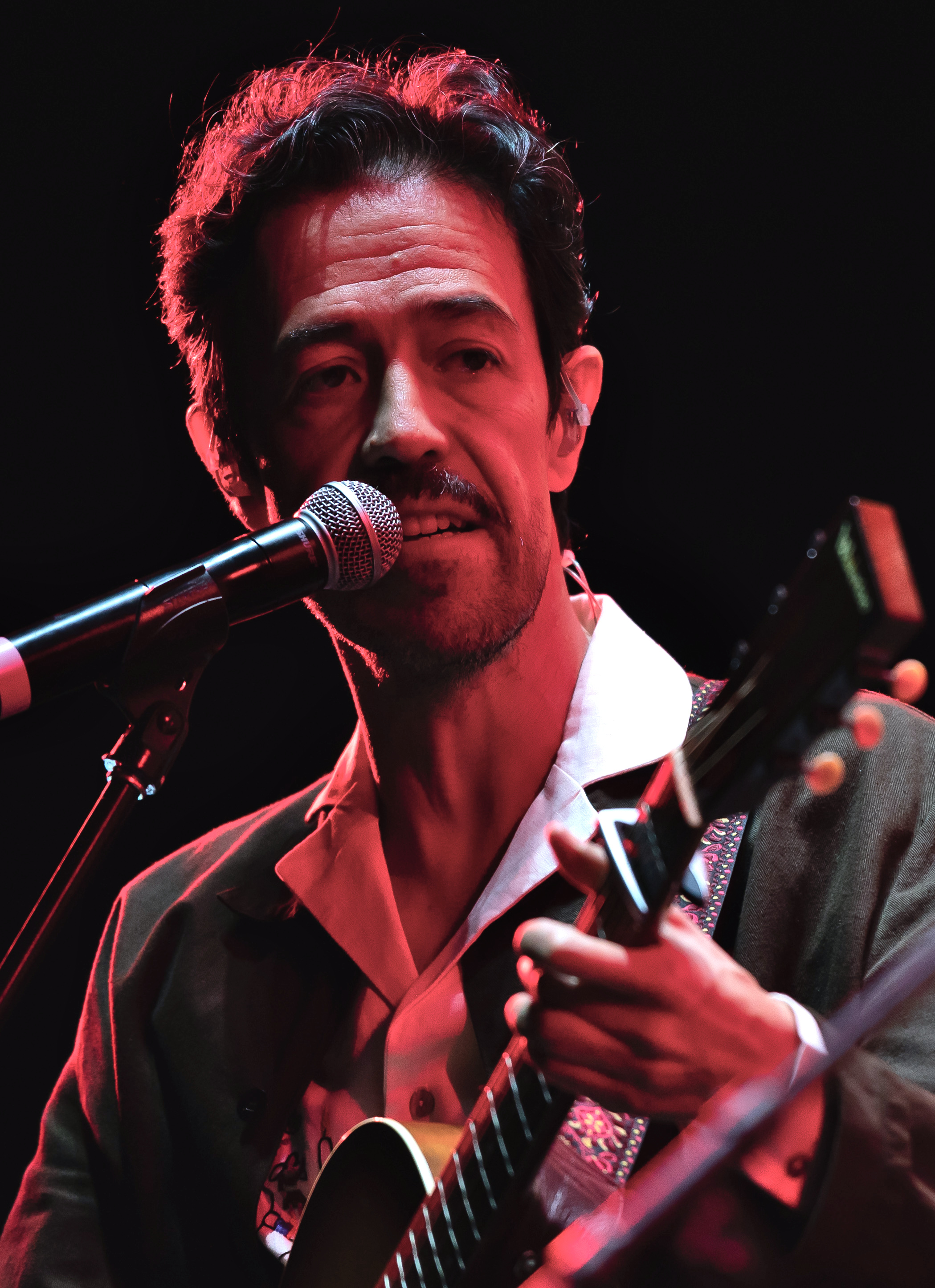
- Born: Emmanuel del Real Díaz; March 22, 1969 Mexico D.F.
- Other name: Meme Memetronic DJ Angustias
- Occupations: Music, composer, musical producer
- Years active: 1989–present
- Spouse: Annia Ezquerro

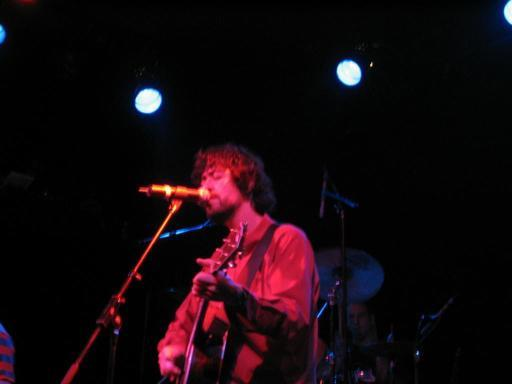
Emmanuel del Real.

Emmanuel del Real Díaz, also known as Meme (Naucalpan, State of Mexico; March 22, 1969), is a Mexican keyboardist, singer, guitarist, and musical producer, current member of the alternative rock group Café Tacvba. He joined the band since it took its current name, replacing Roberto Silva.

== Biography ==
He was born on March 22, 1969, in Echegaray, Naucalpan, Mexico. Son of Verónica Díaz and Manuel Del Real, former member of the legendary Mexican band "Pepe González", Meme comes from a musical family, being the oldest of four brothers.

== Musical career ==
=== Café Tacvba ===
Keyboardist of the group, he also took care of the drum machine, since at first the band did not have a drummer. He is also in charge of the choirs, and since the release of the second album of the band, Re, in 1994, began to be the main singer in some cuts of the album, such as "El Borrego" or "Pez" (although in the beginning he sometimes sang the song "La Bonita y El Flaco" live), changing in these songs momentarily of instrument, from the keyboard to the guitar. In 2004, he and Tom Capone received the most Latin Grammy nominations, with five each.

When Avalancha de Éxitos appeared, once again he took the guitar during other songs, such as "No Controles", and from here he began his learning in the jarana, an instrument to which he would resort an infinity of times in the future. He has written songs for the band such as "La Ingrata", "Las Flores", "Aviéntame", "Eres", "Quiero Ver" and "El Mundo en que Nací".

=== Other jobs ===
He is known in the Mexican electronic scene as "DJ Angustias", being currently part of Noiselab Collective, with which he released the songs "Las 12:00 am" and "Así Es" in addition to having collaborated in 2005 on the soundtrack of the Chilean film En la cama, with the song "Aunque sea".

He has also worked as a producer of various artists of the Mexican scene among which are: Julieta Venegas, Natalia Lafourcade, Ely Guerra, Liquits, Austin TV, Pepe Aguilar and Los Bunkers (from Chile), among others.

In mid-2006, del Real produced and collaborated on the album Hágalo Usted mismo by the Chilean band Los Tres. In addition, at the end of the same year, he collaborated with the soundtrack of the movie Fuera del cielo, from which the single "16 de febrero" was released, in which he shares credits as a singer with Chetes. Fuera del Cielo was his first feature film as a composer of an original soundtrack for cinema.

One of his most recent musical contributions was in the album 'Alebrije', by guitarist and producer Alejandro Marcovich, as instrumentalist and singer in the song El viaje.

== Discography ==
=== With Café Tacvba ===
- 1992: Café Tacvba
- 1994: Re
- 1996: Avalancha de Éxitos
- 1999: Revés/Yo Soy
- 2002: Vale Callampa
- 2003: Cuatro caminos
- 2007: Sino
- 2012: El Objeto Antes Llamado Disco
- 2017: Jei Beibi
- 2019: Un Segundo MTV Unplugged

=== As a producer ===
- 2000: Bueninvento (from Julieta Venegas) Co-producer
- 2004: Sweet & Sour, Hot y Spicy (from Ely Guerra) Co-productor
- 2004: Jardín (from Liquits) Co-producer
- 2004: Álvaro Henríquez (from Álvaro Henríquez) Co-producer
- 2005: Casa (from Natalia Lafourcade) Co-producer
- 2006: Hágalo usted mismo (from Los Tres) Co-producer
- 2006: Bengala (from Bengala) Co-producer
- 2007: Fontana bella (from Austin TV) Producer
- 2009: Hu Hu Hu (from Natalia Lafourcade) Co-producer
- 2009: Yo nunca vi televisión – Tribute to 31 Minutos Co-Producer
- 2010: Música libre (from Los Bunkers) Producer
- 2011: Caballeros del albedrío (from Austin TV) Producer
- 2012: Chica Disco (from Napoleón Solo) Producer
- 2012: Mujer Divina – Homenaje a Agustín Lara (from Natalia Lafourcade) Co-producer
- 2012: Sigue (from Bengala) Producer
- 2013: La velocidad de la luz (de Los Bunkers) Co-producer
- 2014: Cuervos (from Furland) Co-producer
- 2014: MTV Unplugged (from Pepe Aguilar) Producer
