= Up on High =

Studio album by Vetiver
- Released: November 1, 2019
- Length: 41:32
- Label: Mama Bird

Vetiver chronology
Complete Strangers (2015)	Up on High (2019)

Professional ratings
Aggregate scores
Source	Rating
Metacritic	76/100
Review scores
Source	Rating
AllMusic	3.5/5 stars
Exclaim!	5/10
Paste	6.7/10

Up on High is the seventh studio album by American band Vetiver. It was released on November 1, 2019 under Mama Bird Records. In support for the album, a tour of the U.S. and the U.K. was announced.

The first single from the album, "To Who Knows Where" was released on August 28, 2019.

== Critical reception ==
Up on High was met with generally favorable reviews from critics. At Metacritic, which assigns a weighted average rating out of 100 to reviews from mainstream publications, this release received an average score of 76, based on 11 reviews.

== Track listing ==
Up on High track listing
No.	Title	Length
1.	"The Living End"	4:47
2.	"To Who Knows Where"	3:19
3.	"Swaying"	3:18
4.	"All We Could Want"	4:38
5.	"Hold Tight"	4:02
6.	"Wanted, Never Asked"	3:42
7.	"A Door Shuts Quick"	4:17
8.	"Filigree"	3:36
9.	"Up on High"	5:44
10.	"Lost (In Your Eyes)"	4:09
