= Rejoicing in the Hands =

Studio album by Devendra Banhart
- Released: May 4, 2004
- Recorded: 2003
- Genres: Acoustic, folk rock
- Length: 42:03
- Label: Young God
- Producers: Devendra Banhart, Michael Gira

Devendra Banhart chronology
The Black Babies (2003)	Rejoicing in the Hands (2004)	Niño Rojo (2004)

Singles from Rejoicing in the Hands
- 1. "A Sight to Behold" Released: 2004

Rejoicing in the Hands (full title Rejoicing in the Hands of the Golden Empress) is the third studio album by psychedelic folk musician Devendra Banhart and the second full release for the label Young God. It was recorded during 2003 and was released on May 4, 2004.

The song "Insect Eyes" was featured in the teaser trailer for the 2007 horror film The Hills Have Eyes 2. The song "The Body Breaks" was used in the 2007 film Eagle vs. Shark. The song "A Sight to Behold" was also used in a season 2 episode of "Sons of Anarchy".

As of September 2005 Rejoicing in the Hands has sold 24,000 copies in United States, also first four albums collectively have sold 56,000 units up to 2005.

== Reception ==
Professional ratings
Aggregate scores
Source	Rating
Metacritic	88/100
Review scores
Source	Rating
AllMusic	4/5 stars
Entertainment Weekly	B
The Guardian	3/5 stars
The Independent	4/5 stars
Mojo	4/5 stars
NME	9/10
Pitchfork	8.4/10
Q	4/5 stars
Rolling Stone	3/5 stars
Uncut	4/5 stars

At Metacritic, which assigns a normalised rating out of 100 to reviews from mainstream critics, Rejoicing in the Hands received an average score of 88, based on 21 reviews, indicating "universal acclaim". The music review online magazine Pitchfork placed Rejoicing in the Hands at number 193 on their list of top 200 albums of the 2000s. While also placing Rejoicing in the Hands at number 18 on their list of top 100 albums 2000-2004.

The album was also included in the book 1001 Albums You Must Hear Before You Die.

== Track listing ==
No.	Title	Length
1.	"This Is the Way"	2:53
2.	"A Sight to Behold"	2:26
3.	"The Body Breaks"	2:43
4.	"Poughkeepsie"	2:17
5.	"Dogs They Make Up the Dark"	1:20
6.	"Will Is My Friend"	3:04
7.	"This Beard Is for Siobhán"	2:36
8.	"See Saw"	3:22
9.	"Tit Smoking in the Temple of Artesan Mimicry"	1:25
10.	"Rejoicing in the Hands"	1:41
11.	"Fall"	2:53
12.	"Todos los Dolores"	2:30
13.	"When the Sun Shone on Vetiver"	3:34
14.	"There Was Sun"	1:31
15.	"Insect Eyes"	5:08
16.	"Autumn's Child"	2:40

== Personnel ==
- Devendra Banhart – bass, guitar (acoustic, electric), piano, vocals, producer, drawing
- Vashti Bunyan – vocals
- Paul Cantelon – violin
- Thor Harris – percussion, vibraphone
- Julia Kent – cello
- Joe McGinty – organ, piano
- Steve Moses – percussion, drums
- Michael Gira – producer
- Jason LaFarge – engineer
- Doug Henderson – mastering, mixing
- Georgia Bridges – engineer
- Lynn Bridges – engineer

== Chart performance ==
Chart (2004)	Peak position
Dutch Albums (Album Top 100)	30
French Albums (SNEP)	157
