= Tight Knit =

Studio album by Vetiver
- Released: February 17, 2009
- Genre: Folk rock
- Label: Sub Pop

Vetiver chronology
Thing of the Past (2008)	Tight Knit (2009)

Professional ratings
Review scores
Source	Rating
AllMusic	4/5 stars
Pitchfork	7.2/10
The A.V. Club	A−
Slant Magazine	2.5/5 stars

Tight Knit is a full-length album by Vetiver. It was released on February 17, 2009, under Sub Pop Records.

== Track listing ==
All songs written by Andy Cabic.

1. "Rolling Sea" – 5:19
2. "Sister" – 3:44
3. "Everyday" – 3:49
4. "Through the Front Door" – 4:27
5. "Down from Above" – 3:54
6. "On the Other Side" – 3:10
7. "More of This" – 4:01
8. "Another Reason to Go" – 3:44
9. "Strictly Rule" – 4:29
10. "At Forest Edge" – 5:48
11. "Pay No Mind (Bonus Track)"
