= Cripple Crow =

Studio album by Devendra Banhart
- Released: September 13, 2005
- Genre: Indie folk; Latin; psychedelia
- Length: 74:11
- Label: XL Recordings
- Producer: Devendra Banhart, Andy Cabic, Noah Georgeson, Thom Monahan

Devendra Banhart chronology
Niño Rojo (2004)	Cripple Crow (2005)	Devendra Banhart/Jana Hunter (2005)

Singles from Cripple Crow
- 1. "I Feel Just Like a Child" Released: 2005; 2. "Heard Somebody Say" Released: 2005; 3. "Chinese Children" Released: 2005

Professional ratings
Aggregate scores
Source	Rating
Metacritic	79/100
Review scores
Source	Rating
AllMusic	4/5 stars
Entertainment Weekly	A−
The Guardian	4/5 stars
Los Angeles Times	3/4 stars
Mojo	4/5 stars
NME	8/10
Pitchfork	8.4/10
Q	4/5 stars
Rolling Stone	3/5 stars
Spin	C+

Cripple Crow is the fifth album by American-Venezuelan psychedelic folk musician Devendra Banhart released on September 13, 2005 on XL Recordings. It was his first release on the label XL Recordings. The cover references the Sgt. Pepper's Lonely Hearts Club Band album cover.

== Track listing ==
All songs written by Devendra Banhart, except where noted.

No.	Title	Writer(s)	Length
1.	"Now That I Know"		4:53
2.	"Santa Maria da Feira"		4:35
3.	"Heard Somebody Say"		3:20
4.	"Long Haired Child"		3:45
5.	"Lazy Butterfly"		4:00
6.	"Quédate Luna"		3:07
7.	"Queen Bee"		2:44
8.	"I Feel Just Like a Child"		4:46
9.	"Some People Ride the Wave"		2:27
10.	"The Beatles"		1:44
11.	"Dragonflys"		0:59
12.	"Cripple Crow"		5:58
13.	"Inaniel"		3:43
14.	"Hey Mama Wolf"		3:52
15.	"How's About Tellin' a Story"		1:21
16.	"Chinese Children"		5:17
17.	"Sawkill River"		1:52
18.	"I Love That Man"		2:26
19.	"Luna de Margarita"	Simon Diaz	2:07
20.	"Korean Dogwood"		4:02
21.	"Little Boys"		5:20
22.	"Canela"		1:53

The CD release of this album also includes an MP3 bonus track "White Reggae Troll/Africa".

=== Bonus tracks on double LP ===
The double LP release of this album includes eight additional tracks, as well as an alternative cover of the normal album cover replaced with photographs of Devendra's own fans.

No.	Title	Length
1.	"There's Always Something Happening"	4:58
2.	"La Ley"	1:06
3.	"Chicken"	3:10
4.	"Stewed Bark of an Old Oak Tree"	1:38
5.	"La Pastorcita Perdida" ((Atahualpa Yupanqui))	4:22
6.	"Lickety Split"	1:31
7.	"Ice Rat"	2:03
8.	"White Reggae Troll"	9:45

== Personnel ==
- Devendra Banhart – acoustic guitar, electric guitar, vocals, producer, mixing, album art direction
- Emma O'Donnell – fiddle
- Gus – dog
- Andy Cabic – producer
- Noah Georgeson – producer, engineer, mixing
- Thom Monahan – producer, engineer, mixing
- Galen Pehrson – album art
- Alissa Anderson – album art

== Charts ==
Chart (2005)	Peak position
Australian Albums (ARIA Charts)	72
Belgian Albums (Ultratop Wallonia)	84
French Albums (SNEP)	42
Italian Albums (FIMI)	61
UK Albums (OCC)	69
US Billboard 200	115
US Top Rock Albums (Billboard)	36
US Indie Store Album Sales (Billboard)	11

The album sold 47,000 copies in the US. The album has also received an Impala award for 30,000+ copies in Europe.
