= Megapuss =

US musical group

Megapuss is a band with the following members: Devendra Banhart, Gregory Rogove (of Priestbird), Fabrizio Moretti (of The Strokes), and Noah Georgeson (member of Devendra's band and his producer). Megapuss formed as a joke between Banhart and Rogove, where they created the song titles first and wrote humorous songs based on the titles.

Their debut album Surfing was released October 7, 2008, and featured a few guest performances such as Aziz Ansari in the song "Duck People". Their album was more or less critically panned and deemed too light and crude, although many appreciate it for its humor and its solid songs.

== Surfing ==
Surfing

Studio album by Megapuss
- Released: October 7, 2008
- Genres: Experimental rock, indie folk
- Length: 47:57
- Label: Vapor Records

Singles from Surfing
- 1. "Adam & Steve" Released: November 7, 2008

Surfing is the only studio album by Megapuss. It was released digitally on September 16, 2008, and physically on October 7, 2008, on Vapor Records. Actor Aziz Ansari contributed to the song "Duck People Duck Man".

=== Album art ===
The album cover, which depicts the band's two members, Devendra Banhart and Greg Rogove, fighting each other naked, proved controversial upon its release. Rebecca Nicholson wrote that it "takes nudity away from vulnerability, and even sexiness, and hands it right back to the likes of the Red Hot Chili Peppers, circa their sock-donning period. Yes, it's obnoxious, but that has to be better than soft-focus sincerity." The booklet that comes with the album contains even more graphic nude images of Banhart and Rogove.

=== Singles ===
A single, "Adam & Steve" was released on November 7, 2008, along with a music video directed by Amy Jo Diaz. Allison Stewart described the song and music video as, respectively, "a freak pop version of the Doors", and "entertaining as heck, like something the Monkees might have come up with after not showering for several weeks. And taking lots of drugs." The music video was also reviewed by Spin, in which it was described as "a sweetly endearing, jokingly homoerotic display the likes of which hasn't been seen since, well, the latest Judd Apatow movie."

=== Reception ===
Professional ratings
Aggregate scores
Source	Rating
Metacritic	(66%)
Review scores
Source	Rating
Allmusic	3.5/5 stars
Pitchfork Media	(5.9/10)
Robert Christgau	(choice cut)
The A.V. Club	(B)
PopMatters	5/10 stars
The Harvard Crimson	3.5/5 stars

The album was met with lukewarm reception after its release, with many critics dismissing it as an intentional joke. Still, the album did receive some positive reception, with Andy Battaglia writing it had a "sense of musical adventurousness more engrossing than any on Banhart albums in the past." According to Metacritic, the album has a score of 66%, indicating "generally favorable reviews".

=== Track listing ===
1. Crop Circle Jerk '94 4:30
2. Duck People Duck Man 3:25
3. To The Love Within 2:38
4. Adam & Steve 1:46
5. Theme From Hollywood 4:42
6. Surfing 5:02
7. Lavender Blimp 1:18
8. Mister Meat (Hot Rejection) 0:25
9. Hamman 3:46
10. A Gun on His Hip and a Rose on His Chest 3:09
11. Chicken Titz 3:56
12. Sayulita 7:07
13. Older Lives 3:27
14. Another Mother 2:46
