= Gregory Rogove =

American drummer

- Origin: Lancaster, Pennsylvania, US
- Genres: Indie music, freak folk, psychedelic rock, progressive rock
- Instrument: Drums
- Years active: 2000–present
- Label: Knitting Factory Records
- Formerly of: Megapuss, Priestbird
- Website: gregoryrogove.com

Gregory Samuel Rogove is an American drummer and songwriter. He is notable for partnering with indie artist Devendra Banhart to form the group Megapuss. He signed a record contract with Knitting Factory Records in 2011.

== Background ==
Rogove grew up in Amish country in Lancaster, Pennsylvania of Jewish parents with some of his distant ancestors being Mennonites. When eighteen, he traveled to India on a year-long scholarship and studied the tabla. He described India as a "swirl of energy." He traveled to Singapore, Mali, and Mexico. He spent five weeks in China at the Peking Opera and commented that the sound of the gongs made it seem likely that one's head would split in two. The journeys influenced his musical sensibility and helped him achieve a "rich repertoire" with diverse influences from freak folk, psychedelic rock, progressive rock, classical music, punk rock and world music, according to one source. At Wesleyan University, he studied musical composition. Upon his graduation in 2002, he was the recipient of the Pokora Prize, awarded annually to the outstanding undergraduate student in music composition. In the music scene in New York City, he founded a band called Tarantula A.D., which later became the band Priestbird. He performed with artists such as Beck and met Paul McCartney. He plays piano, organ, and flute in addition to his mainstay of writing songs.

== Priestbird ==
The band Priestbird was formed by mutual associations of friends, including Saunder Jurriaans and Danny Bensi. One reviewer described Rogove in Priestbird as anchoring a "welcome foray into sludgy, feedback-heavy noise-rock" after a performance in 2009. A second reviewer found the songs "trippy" and "more epic, heavy, and hypnotic."

== Megapuss ==
During these years he became friends with musician Devendra Banhart, and they collaborated on songs and toured together. According to one account, Rogove and Banhart started their association on the project Megapuss "as a joke" but ended up writing numerous songs together, and the project gelled into a band and an album. The band was "built for laughs" and emphasized "fun", and Banhart and Rogove had promotional pictures featuring the two men "standing stark naked". A reviewer later asked: "Have you found yourself talking about your genitals a lot?" and Rogove said it had been a "prescribed aesthetic decision" in which "everyone is very well represented." The album Surfing was recorded in a cabin near Los Angeles and released in 2008. One report was that the words Mega puss translated from Swedish to English means Mega kiss or big kiss.

Reviews have varied from positive to mixed. One reviewer described the Megapuss album Surfing as something that "sounds like a freak pop version of the Doors" and with a video that was "entertaining as heck" and "something the Monkees might have come up with after not showering for several weeks ... and taking lots of drugs." Another wrote that it was not fruitful to search for levels of meaning in the song "Chicken Titz" but to "just listen and laugh," and described the song "Crop Circle Jerk 94" as "warm and sunny." The reviewer described "Theme from Hollywood" as having a catchy melody but criticized the "meowing breakdown" at the end of the song. A third reviewer described the album as "obnoxious."

In 2011, Rogove lived in Los Angeles.

== Personal life ==
Gregory Rogove is married to Moon Juice creator and wellness influencer Amanda Chantal Bacon, has two children, and lives in the Rustic Canyon neighborhood of Los Angeles, California.
