= Oh Me Oh My (Devendra Banhart album) =

Oh Me Oh My...The Way the Day Goes By the Sun Is Setting Dogs Are Dreaming Lovesongs of the Christmas Spirit

Studio album by Devendra Banhart
- Released: October 28, 2002
- Recorded: 2002
- Genres: Freak folk Lo-fi
- Length: 54:01
- Label: Young God Records
- Producers: Devendra Banhart; Doug Henderson

Devendra Banhart chronology
The Charles C. Leary (2002)	Oh Me Oh My...The Way the Day Goes By the Sun Is Setting Dogs Are Dreaming Lovesongs of the Christmas Spirit (2002)	The Black Babies (2003)

Professional ratings
Review scores
Source	Rating
AllMusic	4/5 stars
Pitchfork	(7.8/10)

Oh Me Oh My (full title Oh Me Oh My...The Way the Day Goes By the Sun Is Setting Dogs Are Dreaming Lovesongs of the Christmas Spirit) is the second album by Devendra Banhart. Its name was taken from the lyrics of one of Banhart's earliest songs, "Sunrise (A Long Time Ago)". It was the first release by Devendra on Young God Records and it came out on October 28, 2002.

== Track listing ==
No.	Title	Length
1.	"Tick Eats the Olive"	0:40
2.	"Roots (If the Sky Were a Stone)"	1:35
3.	"The Charles C. Leary"	2:49
4.	"Nice People"	3:17
5.	"Animals in My Play"	1:28
6.	"Cosmos and Demos"	3:35
7.	"Michigan State"	3:50
8.	"Lend Me Your Teeth"	1:58
9.	"Hey Miss Cane"	3:23
10.	"Soon Is Good"	4:07
11.	"Tell Me Something"	1:12
12.	"The Red Lagoon"	1:16
13.	"A Gentle Soul"	2:03
14.	"Happy Happy Oh"	1:30
15.	"Pumpkin Seeds"	4:34
16.	"The Thumbs Touch Too Much"	2:07
17.	"Legless Love"	2:12
18.	"Marigold"	1:57
19.	"Make It Easier"	0:59
20.	"Ones"	2:25
21.	"Little Monkey"	1:54
22.	"The Spirit Is Near"	1:30

== Personnel ==
- Devendra Banhart – guitar (acoustic, electric), vocals, piano, drums, producer
- Doug Henderson – producer
- Michael Gira – cover design
- Doug Henderson – mastering
- Rodney Miller – layout design

== Additional information ==
A few songs on here also appear on The Charles C. Leary, and they are apparently the same recordings of them. The Charles C. Leary appears in the same form, while "Mmplushumblehorse" has been renamed "Nice People." Miss Cain references Sarah Cain, a woman Banhart was dating at the time. "Gentle Soul" references one of his good friends in Paris who had just had a baby, and named her Camilah.
