= Las 4 Estaciones del Amor =

EP by Natalia Lafourcade
- Released: November 27, 2007
- Recorded: 2007
- Genre: Instrumental
- Length: 28:00
- Label: Sony Mexico
- Producer: Natalia Lafourcade

Natalia Lafourcade chronology
Casa (2005)	Las 4 Estaciones del Amor (2007)	Hu Hu Hu (2009)

Las 4 Estaciones del Amor (English: "The 4 Seasons of Love") is an instrumental extended play (EP) by Mexican singer-songwriter Natalia Lafourcade, released by Sony Music Mexico on November 27, 2007.

== Background ==
The project started when the end of 2006 Natalia Lafourcade is separated from her band "The Forquetina" and settled for nine months in Canada. There she began work on a new project that included the writing and recording a demo for a new CD which would have the distinction of being purely instrumental. The final product was an EP, which defines itself as a "disk Natalia Pop-Symphony", called "The 4 Seasons Of Love", which in turn was a result from her failed relationship with a member of her band. The same was recorded in Mexico in 2007 with the collaboration of the National Youth Orchestra of Veracruz. The EP has a duration of 28 minutes and consists of four movements: Summer, Fall, Winter and Spring, respectively.

== Track listing ==
No.	Title	Writer(s)	Length
1.	"Verano"	Natalia LaFourcade	6:44
2.	"Otoño"	Natalia LaFourcade	6:39
3.	"Invierno"	Natalia LaFourcade	7:39
4.	"Primavera"	Natalia LaFourcade	7:11
