= Vetiver (band) =

American folk music band

Background information
- Origin: San Francisco, United States
- Genres: Indie folk, freak folk, jam band
- Labels: Mama Bird Recording Co., Loose Music, Sub Pop, Bella Union, Gnomonsong, Fat Cat Records
- Members: Andy Cabic; Otto Hauser; Sarah Versprille; Daniel Hindman; Bob Parins
- Website: www.vetiverse.com

Vetiver is an American folk band headed by songwriter Andy Cabic.

== History ==
Vetiver was formed in San Francisco in 2002. The band released their self-titled debut album in 2004 on the small indie folk label DiCristina. Since the album's release, Vetiver has toured extensively, opening for and collaborating with Devendra Banhart and Joanna Newsom. Vetiver released another album, To Find Me Gone, on DiCristina in 2006. Banhart and Cabic also launched their own label, Gnomonsong Recordings, releasing Jana Hunter's Blank Unstaring Heirs of Doom in 2005 and There's No Home in 2007. The label also released in 2008 Vetiver's Thing of the Past, a collection of cover songs that have influenced Cabic's aesthetic. Sub Pop Records (US) and Bella Union (UK) released Vetiver's Tight Knit (2009) The Errant Charm (2011), and Complete Strangers (2015).

The band shared the bill with Vashti Bunyan on her US tour in early 2007. Over the years, the band has toured with artists like Fleet Foxes, The Shins, Fruit Bats and Wilco.

Andy Cabic's music has also been featured in numerous TV commercials, including an original song for Birds Eye. Cabic also works as a composer, including the documentary The Family Jams and the film Smashed, which was shown at the Sundance Film Festival in 2012.

== Discography ==
=== Albums ===
- Vetiver (DiCristina, 2004)
- To Find Me Gone (DiCristina, FatCat, 2006)
- Thing of the Past (Gnomonsong / FatCat, 2008)
- Tight Knit (Sub Pop / Bella Union, 2009)
- The Errant Charm (Sub Pop / Bella Union, 2011)
- Complete Strangers (Easy Sound, 2015)
- Up on High (Mama Bird / Loose Music, 2019)

=== EPs ===
- Between (DiCristina, 2005)
- "You May Be Blue" (Gnomonsong, 2008)
- "More of the Past" (Gnomonsong, 2008)
- In Real Life: Live at Spacebomb Studios (2019) - with Fruit Bats

=== Other contributions ===
- Acoustic 07 (V2 Records, 2007) - "Been So Long"
- The Believer 2004 Music Issue - "Be Kind to Me"
- The Golden Apples Of The Sun (Bastet, 2004) – "Angel's Share"
- Johnny Boy Would Love This...A Tribute to John Martyn (Hole in the Rain Music, 2011) – "Go Easy"
- Be Yourself: A Tribute to Graham Nash's Songs for Beginners (2010) - "I Used To Be A King"
