= Andy Cabic =

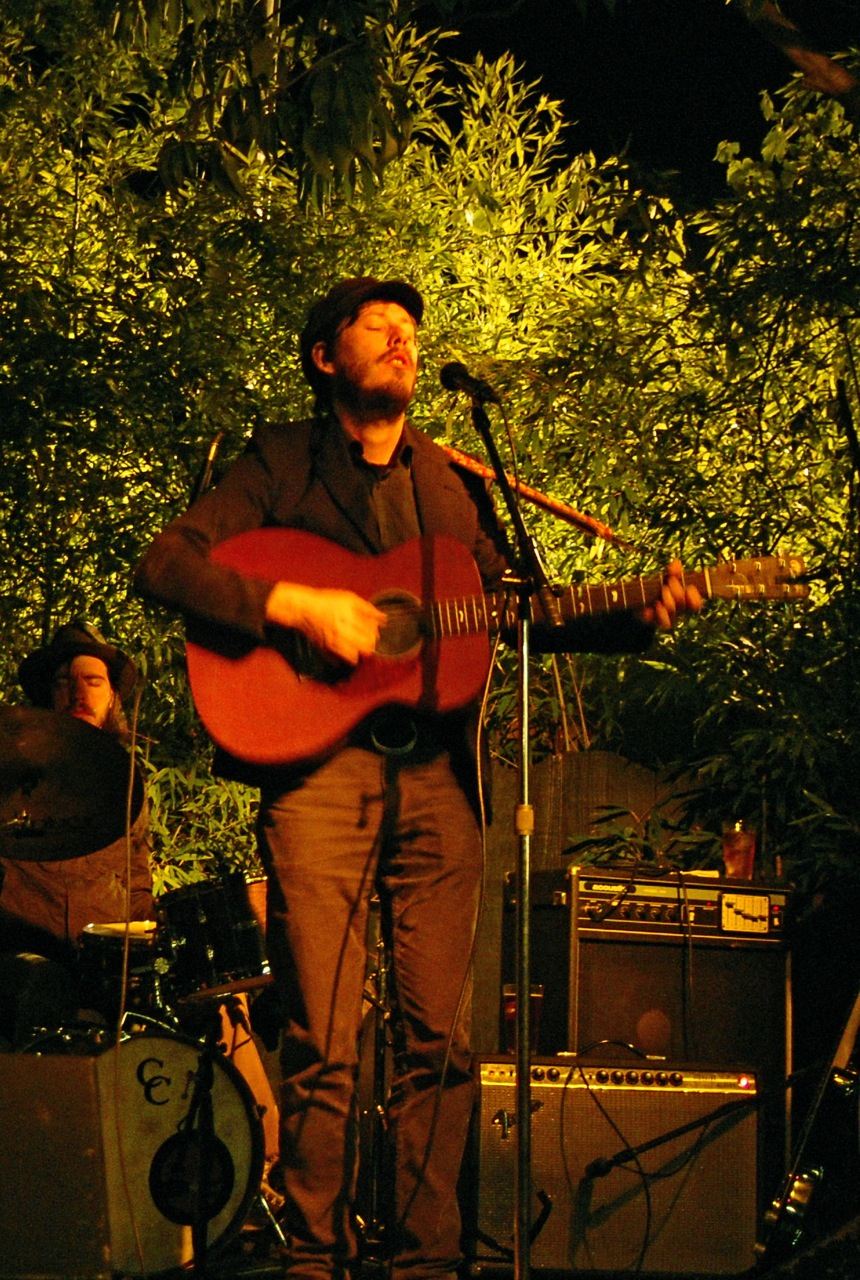

Background information
- Origin: Virginia, United States
- Genres: Indie folk
- Instruments: Vocals, guitar
- Years active: 1992–present
- Label: Gnomonsong
- Website: www.vetiverse.com

Andy Cabic is a folk rock singer-songwriter, and lead member of the band Vetiver.

Andy Cabic was born in Virginia and attended school at the University of North Carolina Greensboro.

In the mid-1990s he was a member of the indie rock band The Raymond Brake, releasing an album on the Simple Machines record label and disbanding in 1998 when Cabic moved to San Francisco.

He is a longtime collaborator of Devendra Banhart, having co-written songs and produced Banhart's album Cripple Crow. He was also at one time a member of the experimental electronic band Tussle.

In 2011, Cabic appeared on former Cardinals guitarist Neal Casal's studio album, Sweeten the Distance.

Cabic co-produced Sarah Lee Guthrie & Johnny Irion album Bright Examples with Thom Monahan.
