= Devendra Banhart =

American folk singer (born 1981)

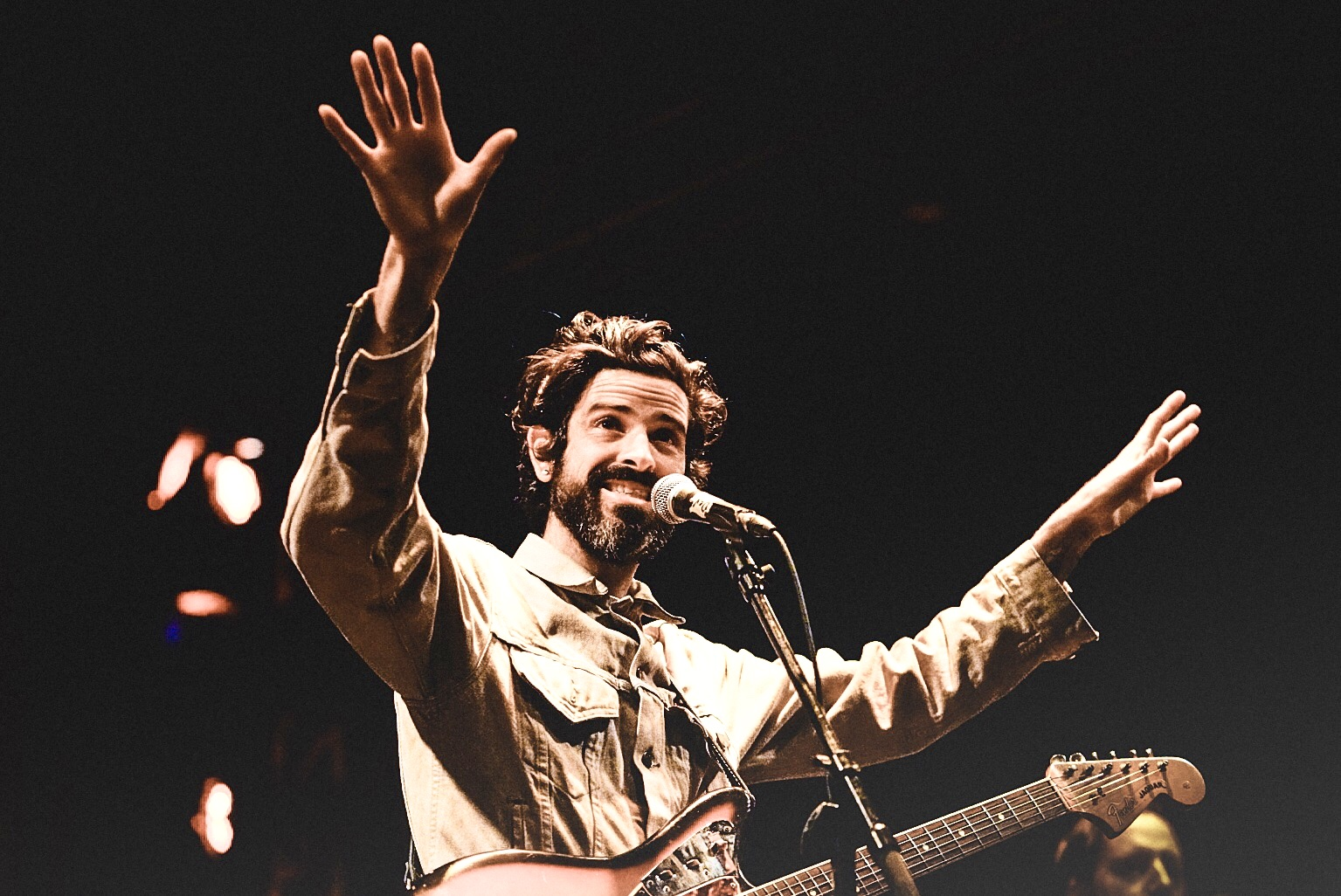
- Banhart performing in 2017

Background information
- Born: Devendra Obi Banhart; May 30, 1981 (age 45); Houston, Texas, U.S.
- Genres: Freak folk; psychedelic folk; New Weird America
- Occupations: Singer-songwriter; musician; visual artist
- Instruments: Guitar; vocals; piano; whistling
- Years active: 2002–present
- Labels: XL Recordings; Young God Records; Hinah; Reprise; Nonesuch Records; Warner Bros. Records
- Formerly of: Megapuss
- Website: devendrabanhart.com

Devendra Obi Banhart (born May 30, 1981) is an American singer-songwriter and visual artist. He was born in Texas and grew up in Venezuela and California. In 2000, he dropped out of the San Francisco Art Institute in San Francisco to pursue a musical career. In 2002, Banhart released his debut album and he is best known for his albums in the late 2000s such as Cripple Crow and Smokey Rolls Down Thunder Canyon. He has since expanded his career to incorporate his interest and training in the visual arts.

== Early life ==
Devendra Obi Banhart was born in Houston, Texas, to a Venezuelan mother, María Eugenia Rísquez, and an American father, Robert Gary Banhart. His mother worked as a model. The name "Devendra"—which is a synonym for the Hindu god Indra—was suggested by the Indian religious leader Prem Rawat, whom Banhart's parents followed. Banhart's middle name was derived from the Star Wars character Obi-Wan Kenobi.

After Banhart's parents divorced in 1983, he and his mother moved to Caracas, Venezuela. She remarried, and when Banhart was 14, his stepfather moved the family to Los Angeles. In 1998, Banhart began studying at the San Francisco Art Institute on a scholarship while living in the Castro District, although he often busked instead of attending class. He played his first musical show in a church at a gay wedding, performing Elvis Presley's "Love Me Tender" and the hymn "How Great Thou Art".

== Musical career ==
Banhart dropped out of college in 2000 and left San Francisco after the dot-com bubble bust impacted the city's economy. That summer, he moved to Paris and began opening shows for indie rock bands including Sonic Youth. He returned to the United States that fall and played music in San Francisco and Los Angeles, until he was discovered by Swans founder Michael Gira, owner of Young God Records, after Siobhan Duffy, Gira's wife, bought a copy of Banhart's CD demo The Charles C. Leary and gave it to Gira.

Banhart and Gira compiled an album from Banhart's recordings, and in 2002, Oh Me Oh My, which was made up of short musical fragments, was published by Young God Records and received favorable reviews. He recorded two other albums and an EP for the label: Rejoicing in the Hands, Niño Rojo, and The Black Babies; the releases had a simple acoustic sound. Banhart moved to XL Recordings in 2005 and released Cripple Crow, which was recorded in Bearsville Studios in Bearsville, New York and had a more elaborate sound.

Banhart's albums offer a variety of musical sounds, and he is often called the leader of a musical movement termed freak folk. His lyrics are fantastical, idealistic, and poetic with the occasional trace of innuendos. In 2005, he collaborated with Antony and the Johnsons on the album I Am a Bird Now. He sings the introduction to the song "Spiralling" and plays guitar on "You Are My Sister" in which Boy George also appears. In 2005, Banhart was in a relationship with Bianca Casady of the band CocoRosie, with Banhart living with Casady and her mother Christina Chalmers at Chalmer's farm in Saintes-Maries-de-la-Mer, a Romani village in southern France. His relationship with Casady ended in 2006. Smokey Rolls Down Thunder Canyon, Banhart's 2007 album, detailed his break up with Casady. He was the first artist to design a T-shirt for the Yellow Bird Project, in 2006. He chose to donate the profits from the sale of his T-shirt to the Teenage Cancer Trust. From 2007 to 2008, Banhart was romantically linked to actress Natalie Portman, who is featured in the video for his song "Carmensita". He recorded his second album for XL Records, Smokey Rolls Down Thunder Canyon, at his home studio in Topanga, California. The album charted on the Billboard 200 at No. 115. The album's song "Lover" was featured in the soundtrack of the movie Nick & Norah's Infinite Playlist, which included a cameo appearance by Banhart.

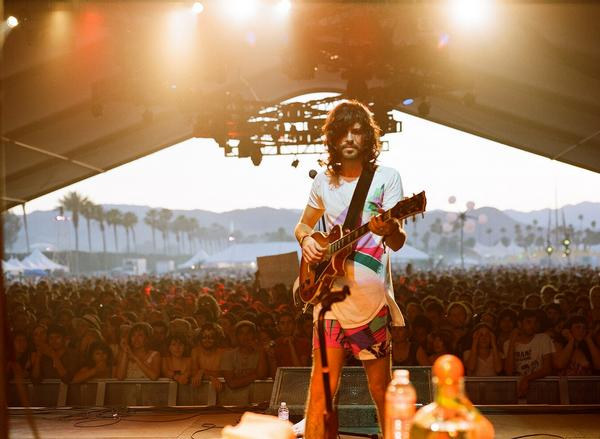
Banhart performs at the 2009 Coachella Festival

Banhart has performed at Carnegie Hall in Midtown Manhattan, New York and the Hollywood Bowl opening for Gilberto Gil, as well as at Bonnaroo and Coachella music festivals. He founded a record label, Gnomonsong, with Andy Cabic of Vetiver, in 2005. In 2007, he signed with Neil Young's manager Elliot Roberts, who also contributed vocals to Smokey Rolls Down Thunder Canyon. Banhart released an album in 2008 entitled Surfing, with Megapuss–a collaborative project with Gregory Rogove and Fabrizio Moretti of The Strokes and Little Joy.

In 2009, he signed to Warner Brothers Records/Reprise Records and released, What Will We Be. Later in 2009, at the band's request, he produced a remix of Oasis' "(Get Off Your) High Horse Lady". Along with "Neighbors", Banhart remixed the Phoenix song "Rome" from their 2009 album Wolfgang Amadeus Phoenix. On September 4, 2009, Beck announced his second Record Club covers album, Songs of Leonard Cohen. Banhart contributed, alongside MGMT, Andrew Stockdale of Wolfmother and Binki Shapiro of Little Joy. Banhart is a collector of music artifacts. He appears and wrote the foreword for his friend Lauren Dukoff's book Family: Photographs by Lauren Dukoff. He has also written the introduction to a selection of poems by Kenneth Patchen. On October 27, 2009, Banhart released What Will We Be, his first record on Warner/Reprise. Banhart and Jon Beasley, who were credited as art directors for the album's artwork and packaging, were nominated for a Grammy in 2011 for Best Recording Package.

The film Life During Wartime, directed by Todd Solondz, features a musical collaboration between Banhart and Beck. The song plays over the film's end credits. Banhart sings lead vocals while Beck adds backing vocals and recorded the track. The lyrics were written by Solondz and the music by composer Marc Shaiman. Banhart is an avid skateboarder. In March 2010, he broke a bone in his right leg while skating, only hours before a concert in Phoenix resulting in the cancellation of future shows in Utah and Colorado. In 2011, he collaborated with Marisa Monte and Rodrigo Amarante on a version of the song "Nú Com a Minha Música" for the Red Hot Organization's recent charitable album Red Hot + Rio 2, a follow-up to 1996's Red Hot + Rio. Proceeds from the sales were donated to raise awareness and money to fight AIDS/HIV and related health and social issues.

In April 2012, Banhart took part in artist Doug Aitken's audiovisual project "Song 1" at the Hirshhorn Museum in Washington, D.C. Banhart joined Beck and James Murphy of LCD Soundsystem in performing "I Only Have Eyes For You" for the project. "Song 1" used eleven high-definition video projectors working in tandem to blanket the museum's entire surface with a video of the performance. In July 2012, Banhart performed on The Eric Andre Show on Adult Swim during the show's first season. On December 3, 2012, Banhart announced his album, Mala. The album was released on March 12, 2013, and was Banhart's debut album for Nonesuch Records. In 2014, he covered Arthur Russell's "Losing My Taste For The Nightlife" for the Red Hot + Arthur Russell compilation which benefitted the Red Hot Organizations fight against AIDS. On May 14, 2016, Banhart curated a two-day event at the Walker Art Center in Minneapolis, Minnesota featuring performances from Harold Budd, Hecuba, Lucky Dragons, Jessica Pratt, Rodrigo Amarante, William Basinksi, and Helado Negro.

In 2015, Banhart scored Joshy, a film directed by Jeff Baena and starring Nick Kroll, Jenny Slate, and Thomas Middleditch. In June 2016, Banhart released the first track of his ninth studio album, Ape in Pink Marble, titled "Middle Names". In August 2016, Banhart released the second track of the same album, titled "Saturday Night". Ape in Pink Marble was released on September 23, 2016, on Nonesuch Records. In 2018, he sang on Ssion's album O, lending vocals to the track "Free Lunch". In September 2018 Banhart participated in the project 27: The Most Perfect Album, which was born out of the podcast More Perfect, a Radiolab spinoff. The project celebrated the 27 amendments of the U.S. Constitution. His tenth studio album, Ma, was released on September 13, 2019, on Nonesuch. Negro remixed the track "Love Song" which was released on January 16, 2020. In April 2020, Banhart was featured on a Mykki Blanco track titled "You Will Find It" In 2020, Banhart, along with Noah Georgeson, scored the film Arkansas, directed by Clark Duke and starring John Malkovich and Liam Hemsworth.

On February 5, 2020, Banhart contributed to a 50th anniversary tribute album honoring Allen Ginsberg's Fall of America. Other artists featured included Mickey Hart, Yo La Tengo, Thurston Moore, and Lee Ranaldo. Banhart provided music and score to the poem "Milarepa Taste". On September 3, 2020, he released a cover of the Grateful Dead's "Franklin's Tower" as part of Amazon's Amazon Originals series. The song has since been widely released. In December 2022 he played in Cusica Fest in Caracas, Venezuela; it was his first show in the country.

=== Influences ===
Banhart has cited Vashti Bunyan, Simón Díaz, Nusrat Fateh Ali Khan, Arthur Russell, Ali Farka Touré, and Caetano Veloso as being his main influences.

=== Critical reception ===
Banhart's music is often referred to as psychedelic folk, freak folk, and New Weird America; it is associated with acts such as singer-songwriter Joanna Newsom, musical group CocoRosie, and contemporary folk band Vetiver. The New York Times has called his work "free associative work" and SPIN magazine said it is "ashram-appropriate guitar strums" and "trippy-hippie tone poetry." Critics have compared Banhart's style to that of 1970s band Tyrannosaurus Rex, an early version of British rock musician Marc Bolan's T. Rex, though in a 2004 interview Banhart said that he was unaware of Tyrannosaurus Rex until after he began writing and recording music.

== Visual art and other media ==
Drawings by Banhart were shown in the San Francisco Museum of Modern Art and in the Centre for Fine Arts, Brussels in Brussels. His drawings have been featured in the Art Basel Contemporary Art Fair in Miami, the Mazzoli Gallery in Modena, Italy, ARCOmadrid in Madrid, Spain, and the Andrew Roth Gallery in Manhattan. His drawings were featured in MOCA's exhibit "The Artist's Museum", in which the works of influential Los Angeles based artists from the last 30 years were presented. As part of the exhibition, Banhart collaborated with artist Doug Aitken and musicians Beck and Caetano Veloso for a musical and visual performance piece.

Banhart was a participant in Yoko Ono's second Water Piece project. He read Joan Miró's poem "A Star Caresses the Breasts of a Negress" for the recorded guided tour of Tate Modern in London. In May 2015, Anteism published a collaborative book with Banhart and artist Adam Tullie titled Unburdened By Meaning. In June 2015, Banhart released a collection of drawings, paintings, and mixed media pieces, titled I Left My Noodle on Ramen Street, published by Prestel Publishing in Munich, Germany. In 2016, he had a cameo in the feature film Adam Green's Aladdin. In November 2018, he curated part of the program for the Le Guess Who? festival in Utrecht, Netherlands.

On April 23, 2019, Featherproof Books published Banhart's first book of poetry titled Weeping Gang Bliss Void Yab-Yum. On May 8, 2019, he announced a collaborative collection of linen clothing with designer Alex Crane titled "Almas". In September 2019, Anteism published a book of his drawings titled Vanishing Wave and the drawings were sold to benefit the victims of the 2011 Tōhoku earthquake and tsunami in Fukushima, Japan.

On December 14 and 15, 2019, Banhart curated a two-day event at Hauser and Wirth Los Angeles titled Other Flowers. The event featured his photography, paintings, and a pop up store with limited edition merchandise, as well as a series of performances featuring musicians Rodrigo Amarante, Tim Presley, and Banhart himself. It included performance art from Jasmine Albuquerque and Friends, Invisible Women, and Nao Bustamante. In March 2020, Banhart had his first solo art show in Los Angeles at Nicodim Gallery. The show was titled The Grief I Have Caused You and featured his first series of oil paintings in addition to drawings from 2019 to 2020. In 2023, Banhart exhibited in a Tokyo group exhibition at Gallery Common curated by artist and musician Amadour including artist Sayre Gomez.

== Band ==
Banhart's live band has had multiple names, including Spiritual Bonerz (the 'z' is silent) and The Grogs.

- Devendra Banhart – vocals, guitar, organ, synthesizers, samba, and more
- Rodrigo Amarante – guitar, bass, backing vocals, synthesizer
- Noah Georgeson – guitar, multiple instruments, producer
- Gregory Rogove – drummer, backing vocals
- Josiah Steinbrick – bass, multiple instruments
- Todd Dahlhoff – bass, backing vocals
- H. Hawkline – guitar (2017 Ape in Pink Marble tour)
- Tim Presley (2017 Ape in Pink Marble tour)
- Luckey Remington (2017 Ape in Pink Marble tour)

Occasionally:

- Andy Cabic (from Vetiver) – guitar
- Fabrizio Moretti (from The Strokes) – drummer
- Michael Gira (from Swans) – harmonica, vocals, producer
- Jordan Katz – trumpet

== Discography ==
=== Studio albums ===
Year	Album	UK Albums Chart	US Billboard 200	US Billboard Heatseekers	Sales
2002	The Charles C. Leary	—	—	—	
2002	Oh Me Oh My	—	—	—	
2004	Rejoicing in the Hands	100	—	—	US: 24,000
2004	Niño Rojo	—	—	—	
2005	Cripple Crow	69	—	13	US: 72,995
2007	Smokey Rolls Down Thunder Canyon	93	115	3	US: 52,995
2009	What Will We Be	109	139	4	US: 23,827
2013	Mala	143	139	2	
2016	Ape in Pink Marble	—	—	18	
2019	Ma	—	—	—	
2023	Flying Wig	—	—	—	

=== Singles and EPs ===
- The Black Babies (2003)
- Sight To Behold/Be Kind (2004)
- Little Yellow Spider (2004)
- At The Hop (2004)
- I Feel Just Like A Child (2005)
- Heard Somebody Say (2005)
- Chinese Children (2005)
- Xiu Xiu/Devendra Banhart split 7-inch (2005)
- White Reggae Troll (2006)
- Carmensita (2007)
- Lover (2007)
- Baby (2009)
- 16th & Valencia Roxy Music (2009)
- Foolin' (2010)
- Something French/Loring Baker' (2014)
- Middle Names (2016)
- Fig in Leather (2017)
- Vast Ovoid (2020)

=== Collaborations and compilations ===
- The Golden Apples of the Sun (2004)
- Jana Hunter / Devendra Banhart (with Jana Hunter, 2005)
- Love Above All (2007)
- Xiu Xiu's Remixed & Covered (2007)
- Surfing (as Megapuss with Gregory Rogove, 2008)
- Songs of Leonard Cohen – Beck's Record Club (2009)
- Loving Takes This Course – A Tribute to the Songs of Kath Bloom (2009)
- Amador – You're The One with Adanowsky (2010)
- Mujer Divina – Homenaje a Agustín Lara – Amor, amor de mis amores with Natalia Lafourcade (2012)
- "Time" with Stray Dogg (2012)
- Someday with Akira Kosemura (2017)
- A Kind of Love Song with Shuta Hasunuma & U-Zhaan (2018)
- Refuge with Noah Georgeson (2021)
