= 2004 Multishow Brazilian Music Awards =

11th edition of the Multishow Brazilian Music Awards held in 2004

- Date: 1 June 2004
- Location: Theatro Municipal; Rio de Janeiro, Rio de Janeiro, Brazil
- Hosted by: Regina Casé; Nelson Motta
- Website: gshow.globo.com/multishow/premio-multishow

Television/radio coverage
- Network: Multishow

The 2004 Multishow Brazilian Music Awards (Portuguese: Prêmio Multishow de Música Brasileira 2004) (or simply 2004 Multishow Awards) (Portuguese: Prêmio Multishow 2004) was held on 1 June 2004, at the Theatro Municipal in Rio de Janeiro, Brazil. Regina Casé and Nelson Motta hosted the ceremony.

== Winners and nominees ==
Nominees for each award are listed below; winners are listed first and highlighted in boldface.

Best Male Singer	Best Female Singer
**Caetano Veloso**; Chorão; Samuel Rosa; Toni Garrido; Zeca Pagodinho	**Maria Rita**; Ana Carolina; Gal Costa; Paula Toller; Sandy
Best Group	New Solo Artist
**Los Hermanos**; CPM 22; Jota Quest; O Rappa; Skank	**Pitty**; Felipe Dylon; Luka; Preta Gil; Vanessa da Mata
New Group	Best Instrumentalist
**Babado Novo**; Eletrosamba; Kaleidoscópio; Lan Lan e os Elaines; Reação em Cadeia	**Champignon (Charlie Brown Jr.)**; George Israel (Kid Abelha); Junior Lima (Sandy & Junior); Tony Bellotto (Titãs); Yamandu Costa
Best CD	Best DVD
**À Procura da Batida Perfeita – Marcelo D2**; Cosmotron – Skank; Identidade – Sandy & Junior; Maria Rita – Maria Rita; Ventura – Los Hermanos	**Jota Quest**; CPM 22; Maria Rita; Os Paralamas do Sucesso; Zeca Pagodinho
Best Song	Best Music Video
**"Vou Deixar" – Skank**; "A Festa" – Maria Rita; "Amor Maior" – Jota Quest; "Sorte Grande" – Ivete Sangalo; "O Vencedor" – Los Hermanos	**"Túnel do Tempo" – Frejat**; "Cara Estranho" – Los Hermanos; "Loadeando" – Marcelo D2; "Olhos Certos" – Detonautas; "Desperdiçou" – Sandy & Junior
Best Show
**Skank**; Charlie Brown Jr.; Jota Quest; Maria Rita; Titãs
