= Cavalo (album) =

Studio album by Rodrigo Amarante
- Released: September 22, 2013 (Brazil); May 5, 2014 (Europe, Latin America, Australia, South Africa, Japan); May 6, 2014 (United States, Canada)
- Genre: Folk rock; MPB; psychedelic folk; experimental
- Length: 37:39
- Label: Som Livre; Polysom; Um Discos; Easy Sound
- Producer: Noah Georgeson

Rodrigo Amarante chronology
| Little Joy (2008) | Cavalo (2013) |

Singles from Cavalo
- 1. "Maná" Released: March 27, 2013; 2. "Hourglass" Released: June 9, 2014; 3. "Tardei" Released: September 10, 2014; 4. "I'm Ready" Released: August 28, 2015

Cavalo is the first solo album of singer Rodrigo Amarante. It was first released September 2013 in Brazil by the record label Som Livre & re-released in May 2014 by the label Easy Sound.

A re-recorded special edition of Cavalo was recently released and re-issued in vinyl and on streaming services.

== Background and recording ==
After the breakup of Los Hermanos in 2007, Amarante began to devote himself to the Orquestra Imperial and the group Little Joy, which he co-founded with Fabrizio Moretti and Binki Shapiro. After the trio's release of their first album in 2008, the band went on tour in Brazil, and by 2009 they had toured globally. Living in Los Angeles, a place where he was unknown, Amarante began to write songs about an "exile", and become reacquainted with his own nature, forming what would become Cavalo. The album was recorded in Los Angeles and Rio de Janeiro in 2012, and contains tracks sung in three different languages: Portuguese, English and French, plus some Japanese verses in the title track. Amarante alone recorded most of the album, which features the participation of former bandmates Rodrigo Barba, Fabrizio Moretti, and Devendra Banhart.

== Critical reception ==
Professional ratings
Review scores
| Source | Rating |
|---|---|
| Omelete | 4/5 stars |
| The Music Box | 3/5 stars |
| Rolling Stone | 4/5 stars |
| Tenho Mais Discos que Amigos! | 8/10 |

The album received critical acclaim, with Rolling Stone magazine placing the album in sixth place in the best national discs of 2013. In a similar list on the site Tenho Mais Discos que Amigos!, Cavalo ranked in fourth position. In 2014, the album was voted by the Portuguese newspaper Público as the fifth-best album of the year. British magazine MOJO elected it as the third-best album of the year in the "World" category.

== Touring and promotion ==
Three singles were released for Cavalo: "Manna," "Hourglass", and "Tardei." Video clips were launched via the Internet to all singles.

The Rodrigo Amarante tour began in May 2013 in the United States, before the release of Cavalo, when Amarante opened for the shows of Devendra Banhart. For this leg of the tour, Amarante divided the band with Devendra, formed by Fabrizio Moretti, Todd Dahholff and Josiah Steinbrick, taking turns on the instruments.

In September 2013, after the record's release, Amarante began the Cavalo tour in Brazil. The tour's band consisted of Rodrigo Barba (drums), Gabriel Bubu (guitar), Gustavo Benjão (bass) and Lucas Vasconcellos (keyboards). Amarante played in 8 different cities between September and November, and later opened concerts for Devendra Banhart in South America.

In 2014, Rodrigo toured the United States and Europe, playing in over 20 different countries with a different band, consisting of Todd Dahlhoff (bass and keyboards), Matt Borg (guitar and keyboards), and Matthew Compton (drums). The tour returned to Brazil in November before its closure.

== Tracklisting ==
| No. | Title | Writer(s) | Length |
|---|---|---|---|
| 1. | "Nada em Vão" | Rodrigo Amarante | 3:05 |
| 2. | "Hourglass" | Rodrigo Amarante | 3:32 |
| 3. | "Mon Nom" | Rodrigo Amarante | 4:08 |
| 4. | "Irene" | Rodrigo Amarante | 3:17 |
| 5. | "Maná" | Rodrigo Amarante | 2:39 |
| 6. | "Fall Asleep" | Rodrigo Amarante | 3:19 |
| 7. | "The Ribbon" | Rodrigo Amarante | 4:49 |
| 8. | "O Cometa" | Rodrigo Amarante | 2:52 |
| 9. | "Cavalo" | Rodrigo Amarante | 2:36 |
| 10. | "I'm Ready" | Rodrigo Amarante | 3:49 |
| 11. | "Tardei" | Rodrigo Amarante | 3:33 |
| Total length: | | | 37:39 |

== Credits ==
- Rodrigo Amarante – Arrangements, composition, sound engineer, vocals, instrumentation
- Devendra Banhart – Choir
- Adam Green – Choir
- Josiah Steinbrick – Choir
- Kristen Wiig – Choir
- Todd Dahlhoff – Bass
- Fabrizio Moretti – Choir, drums
- Rodrigo Barba – Drums
- Joel Virgel – Djembe
- Hiromi Konishi – Vocals
- Noah Georgeson – Synthesizer, engineer, mixing, producer
- JJ Golden – Mastering
- Samur Khouja – Engineer
