= 2003 MTV Video Music Brazil =

Award ceremony

- Date: 26 August 2003
- Location: Anhembi Convention Center, São Paulo, São Paulo
- Country: Brazil
- Hosted by: Fernanda Lima
- Most awards: Marcelo D2 (3)
- Most nominations: Sepultura (5)

Television/radio coverage
- Network: MTV Brasil

The 2003 MTV Video Music Brazil was held on 26 August 2003, at the Anhembi Convention Center in São Paulo, honoring the best Brazilian music videos. The ceremony was hosted by Fernanda Lima for the second consecutive time.

== Winners and nominees ==
The nominees were announced on 23 June 2003. Winners are listed first and highlighted in bold.

Video of the Year	Viewer's Choice
**Marcelo D2 – "Qual É"**; Capital Inicial – "Quatro Vezes Você"; Charlie Brown Jr. – "Só por Uma Noite"; Los Hermanos – "Cara Estranho"; Skank – "Dois Rios"	**Charlie Brown Jr. – "Papo Reto (Prazer É Sexo, o Resto É Negócio)"**; B5 – "Matemática"; Capital Inicial – "Quatro Vezes Você"; CPM 22 – "Desconfio"; Detonautas Roque Clube – "Quando o Sol Se For"; Engenheiros do Hawaii – "Até o Fim"; Frejat – "Eu Preciso Te Tirar do Sério"; Jota Quest – "Só Hoje"; Kelly Key – "Adoleta"; Kid Abelha – "Nada Sei (Apnéia)"; KLB – "Por Causa de Você"; Marcelo D2 – "Qual É?"; Os Paralamas do Sucesso – "Cuide Bem do Seu Amor"; Pitty – "Máscara"; Rouge – "Brilha la Luna"; Sepultura – "Bullet the Blue Sky"; Skank – "Dois Rios"; Tihuana – "Bote Fé"; Titãs – "Isso"; Tribalistas – "Já Sei Namorar"; Wanessa Camargo – "Sem Querer"
Best New Artist	Best Pop Video
**Detonautas Roque Clube – "Quando o Sol Se For"**; B5 – "Matemática"; Lan Lan e os Elaines – "100 Xurumela"; Monobloco – "Imunização Racional (Que Beleza)"; Pitty – "Máscara"	**Skank – "Dois Rios"**; Nando Reis – "Dentro do Mesmo Time"; Os Paralamas do Sucesso – "Seguindo Estrelas"; Pato Fu – "Não Mais"; Tribalistas – "Já Sei Namorar"
Best MPB Video	Best Rock Video
**Gilberto Gil – "Three Little Birds"**; Seu Jorge – "Carolina"; Wilson Simoninha – "Essência"; Max de Castro – "A História da Morena Nua Que Abalou as Estruturas do Esplendor do Carnaval"; Zeca Pagodinho – "Caviar"	**Charlie Brown Jr. – "Só por Uma Noite"**; Capital Inicial – "Quatro Vezes Você"; Los Hermanos – "Cara Estranho"; Nação Zumbi – "Blunt of Judah"; Sepultura – "Bullet the Blue Sky"
Best Rap Video	Best Electronic Video
**Marcelo D2 – "Qual É"**; De Conceito – "C Virá, Virô"; Ferrez – "Judas"; Nega Gizza – "Depressão"; Sabotage – "Respeito é pra Quem Tem"	**DJ Patife and Fernanda Porto – "Sambassim"**; AD – "Call My Name"; DJ Marcelinho – "DJ Que é DJ"; DJ Periférico vs. Ximbica – "Natália Buzina"; Domenico+2 – "Alegria, Vai Lá"
Best International Video	Best Independent Video
**Linkin Park – "Somewhere I Belong"**; Avril Lavigne – "Complicated"; the Calling – "Wherever You Will Go"; Christina Aguilera featuring Redman – "Dirrty"; Creed – "Don't Stop Dancing"; Eminem – "Without Me"; Kelly Osbourne – "Papa Don't Preach"; Mariah Carey – "Boy (I Need You)"; Nelly featuring Kelly Rowland – "Dilemma"; Nick Carter – "Do I Have to Cry for You?"; Red Hot Chili Peppers – "By the Way"; t.A.T.u. – "All the Things She Said"	**Ratos de Porão** – "Próximo Alvo"; Cachorro Grande – "Lunático"; DeFalla – "Amanda"; Forgotten Boys – "Cumn On"; Mukeka di Rato – "Maconha"
Best Artist Website	Best Direction in a Video
**Nando Reis (www.nandoreis.com.br)**; Bidê ou Balde (www.bideoubalde.com.br); Pato Fu (www.patofu.com.br); Rodox (www.rodox.com.br); Sepultura (www.sepultura.com.br)	**Marcelo D2 – "Qual É" (Director: Johnny Araújo)**; Charlie Brown Jr. – "Só por Uma Noite" (Directors: Johnny Araújo and Chorão); Los Hermanos – "Cara Estranho" (Directors: Caito Ortiz and Doca Corbett); Os Paralamas do Sucesso – "Seguindo Estrelas" (Directors: Andrucha Waddington and Breno Silveira); Titãs – "Isso" (Director: Oscar Rodrigues Alves)
Best Art Direction in a Video	Best Editing in a Video
**Gilberto Gil – "Three Little Birds" (Art Directors: Gualter Pupo and Flávio Mac)**; Los Hermanos – "Cara Estranho" (Art Directors: Caito Ortiz, Doca Corbett and Marcão Carvalheiro); Nação Zumbi – "Blunt of Judah" (Art Directors: Antonio Freitas and Dalmo Louzada); Nando Reis – "Dentro do Mesmo Time" (Art Director: Toni Vanzolini); Rodox – "Quem Tem Coragem Não Finge" (Art Director: Apavoramento Sound System)	**Pato Fu – "Não Mais" (Editor: Brokolis do Brasil)**; Capital Inicial – "Quatro Vezes Você" (Editors: Márcio Soares, Paulo Calia and Quincas Moreira); Nação Zumbi – "Blunt of Judah" (Editors: Luciano Pommella and Beto Araújo); Nando Reis – "Dentro do Mesmo Time" (Editor: Paulo de Barros); Sepultura – "Bullet the Blue Sky" (Editor: Márcio Soares)
Best Photography in a Video
**Sepultura – "Bullet the Blue Sky" (Directors of Photography: Ricardo Della Rosa and João Itaboraí)**; Capital Inicial – "Quatro Vezes Você" (Director of Photography: Adrian Teijido); Marcelo D2 – "Qual É" (Director of Photography: Jacques Cheuiche); Max de Castro – "A História da Morena Nua Que Abalou as Estruturas do Esplendor do Carnaval" (Director of Photography: Adriano Goldman); Skank – "Dois Rios" (Directors of Photography: Adriano Goldman and Fernando Cohen)
