= Andrew Balogh =

American music producer

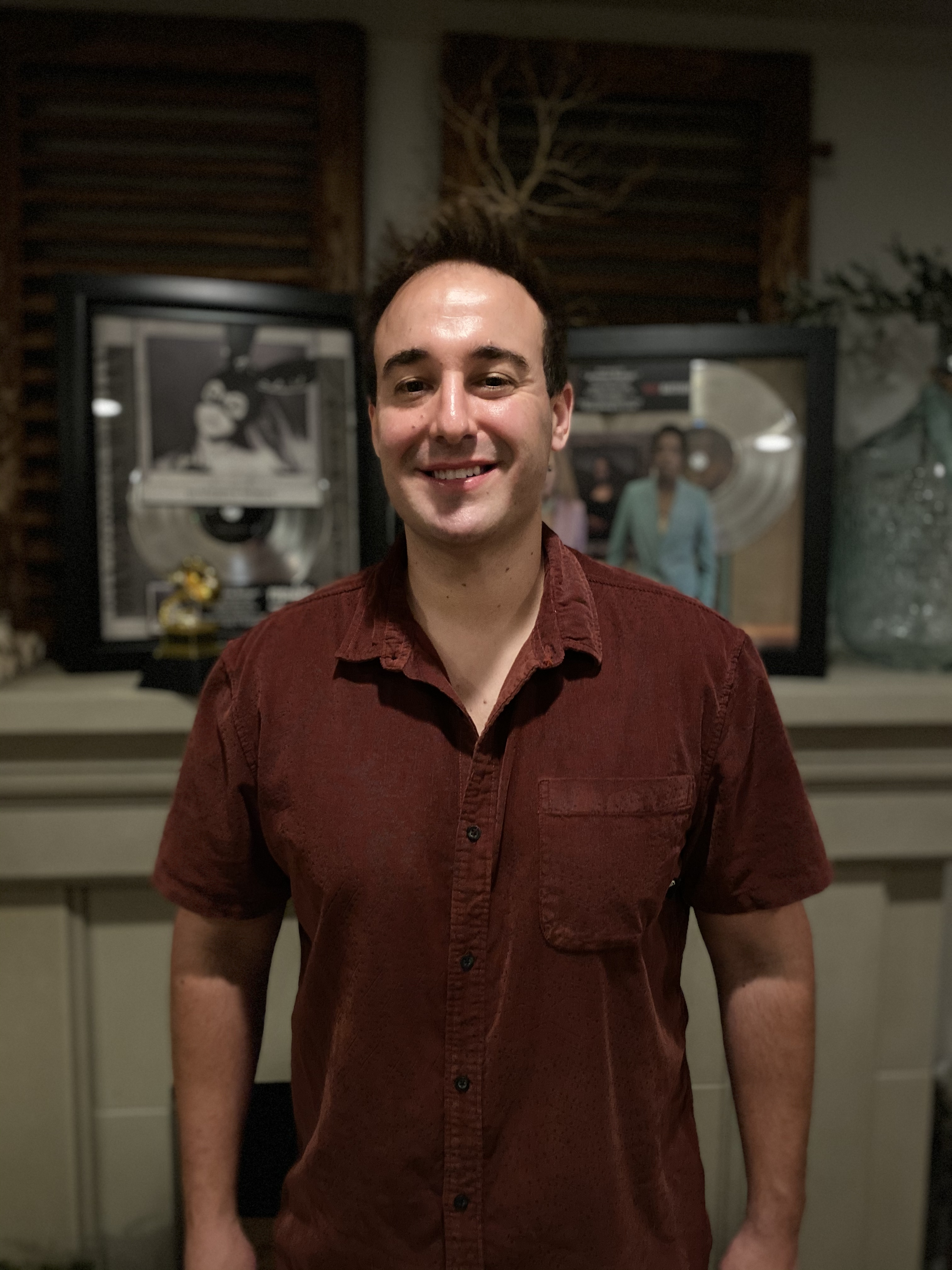

Background information
- Born: Harbor City, California, U.S.
- Occupations: Music Producer, Composer, Saxophonist, Record Executive
- Years active: 2010–present
- Label: Universal Music Group

Andrew Balogh is an American music producer, songwriter, film composer and saxophonist. He has worked with artists such as Jay-Z, Beyoncé, Coldplay, Ariana Grande, and Taylor Eigsti.

== Early life and education ==
Andrew Balogh was born and raised in Harbor City, California. He started playing saxophone and piano when he was 7 years old. He was passionate about jazz and classical music and started composing music when he was in high school. Balogh attended Bob Cole Conservatory of Music, majoring in Jazz Studies and Composition.

== Career ==
Balogh contributed to the rapper Gunplay's favorably acclaimed album Living Legend, ranking #171 in the 2015 US Billboard Top 200, #17 in the 2015 US Billboard Top R&B/Hip-Hop Albums and #11 in the 2015 US Billboard Top Rap Albums. He worked on Taylor Eigsti's album Tree Falls, which received the Grammy Award for Best Contemporary Instrumental Album at the 64th Annual Grammy Awards, and on Plot Armor, which was nominated for the same category at the 67th Annual Grammy Awards.

As a saxophonist and keyboardist, Balogh has toured with artists and bands such as Macy Gray, Lady Gaga, and Sublime With Rome. Most recently, Balogh collaborated with actor Robert De Niro for the 2016 motion picture Dirty Grandpa, performing on the song "It Was a Good Day".

== United Nations ==
In July 2024, Balogh was inducted into the United Nations as a council member of the Council of Global Change, serving alongside Susan Rockefeller, Anna Rothschild, Charlie Walk, Marla Maples, and other members.

== Discography ==
Work	Role	Notes	Ref
Little Joy (album)	Baritone Saxophone	Side-project of The Strokes drummer Fabrizio Moretti	
Like a Drug (mixtape album) by Honey Cocaine	Producer	Producer on Babysitta	
Living Legend by Gunplay	Co-writer, Producer	Co-writer and producer on From Da Jump	
It Was a Good Day	Composer, Performer	From the motion picture Dirty Grandpa	
Property by Liane V and Jessica Lesaca	Songwriter, Producer		
You and I by Johnny Orlando	Songwriter, Producer		
Let Go by Johnny Orlando	Songwriter, Producer		
Guilty as Charged	Songwriter, Producer	From the motion picture Tallulah (Film)	
Bad Boys for Life	Soundtrack Musician		
Fade 2 Black	Songwriter, Producer	From the motion picture The Outcasts (Film)	

== Awards ==
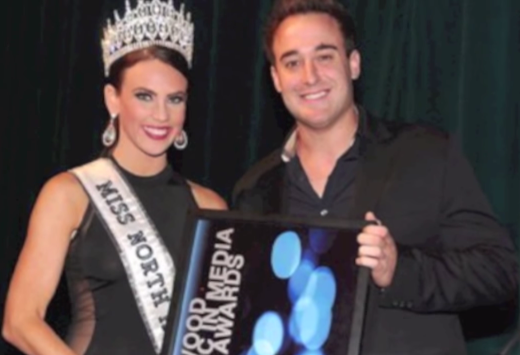
Andrew Balogh accepts the 2013 Hollywood Music and Media Special Recognition Award for an Original Score. Presented by Miss North Hollywood, Brittany Wagner.

- 2013 Hollywood Music And Media Awards - Special Recognition For Original Score - TV PROMO - Throw it Back (Reality Series TV Show)
