= Rossana Casale =

Italian singer

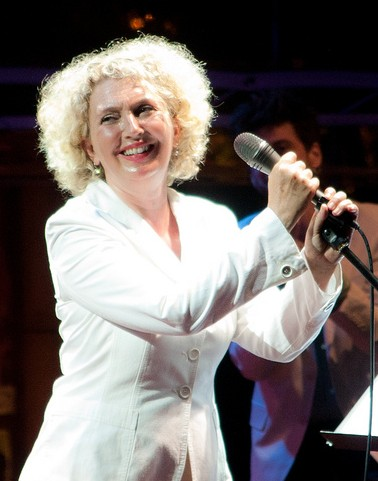
- Rossana Casale 2010

Background information
- Born: July 21, 1959 (age 67); New York, U.S.
- Origin: Milan, Italy
- Genres: Pop; jazz
- Occupation: Singer
- Instrument: Vocals
- Years active: 1982–present
- Website: rossanacasale.it

Rossana Casale (born July 21, 1959) is an Italian singer.

== Biography ==
Casale was born in New York City to an Italian-American father, photographer Giac Casale, and an Italian mother. Shortly after her birth the family moved to Venice, Italy, then to Milan, where Casale grew up. Her music career began in the late 1970s as backing vocalist for a band called Albero Motore. She also did session work for many dance music productions such as Klein & MBO, Kano, Mike Francis and Pink Project. Casale enrolled in the Conservatory G. Verdi in Milan where she studied singing and percussion. Casale's first single as a solo artist, "Didin" (1982), was co-written with Alberto Fortis, while her first album, Rossana Casale, was released in 1984 and produced by members of Premiata Forneria Marconi.

In 1983 she played a small role in Pupi Avati's film Una gita scolastica, and also contributed to the film soundtrack with two songs, L'incanto and A tu per tu. In 1986 and 1987 she participated to the Sanremo festival with "Brividi", (written by Maurizio Fabrizio) and "Destino". Also in 1986, she won the Canale 5 television song contest Premiatissima 86, with the song "Nuova vita". In 1987 she released her second album, La via dei misteri and was invited to perform at Umbria Jazz Festival in Perugia. Casale participated three further times at the Sanremo Festival, in 1989 with "A che servono gli dei" (from the album Incoerente Jazz), in 1991 with "Terra" (album Lo stato naturale) and in 1993 with "Gli amori diversi" (a duet with Italian pop singer Grazia Di Michele that finished third in the final standing).

Following the release of her 1994 album Jazz in me, in 1995 Casale made her theatre debut in an Italian production of An American in Paris with Raffaele Paganini. Casale's performance received positive reviews and she was awarded the "Bob Fosse" Prize for best debuting actress. In 1996 Casale released her 7th album, Nella notte un volo, written and produced by Casale herself and Andrea Zuppini. It was followed by a promotional tour with 50 performances. After the Jacques Brel in me album (1999), in 1999 she returned to theatre, playing Marilyn Monroe's character Sugar in homonymous movie) alongside Alessandro Gassman and Gianmarco Tognazzi. In 2000 she continued to alternate music and theatre, releasing the album Strani frutti, and playing Audrey in a production of Little Shop of Horrors directed by Saverio Marconi. In 2002 Casale released Riflessi, and in 2004 she recorded Billie Holliday in me, an album of Billie Holiday's songs which was followed by 250 concerts across Italy. In 2006 she released Circo immaginario, an album she co-produced with Anderea Zuppini. In 2007 she wrote and performed the musical Otto donne ed un mistero directed by Claudio Insegno.

== Discography ==
Albums

- 1984 – Rossana Casale (mini-LP)
- 1986 – La via dei misteri
- 1987 – La via dei misteri (re-release with 2 additional tracks)
- 1989 – Incoerente Jazz
- 1989 – Frammenti (compilation)
- 1991 – Lo stato naturale
- 1992 – Brividi (compilation with new tracks)
- 1993 – Alba Argentina
- 1994 – Jazz in Me
- 1996 – Nella notte un volo
- 1999 – Jacques Brel in Me
- 2000 – Strani frutti
- 2002 – Riflessi (compilation with new and rearranged tracks)
- 2004 – Billie Holiday in Me
- 2006 – Circo immaginario
- 2009 – Merry Christmas in Jazz
- 2014 – Il signor G e l'amore
- 2016 – Round Christmas

Duets

- With Alberto Fortis - "Innamorata" – "Neve" (1982)
- With Daniele Groff - "Pensieri e parole"
- With Eugenio Finardi - "Le ragazze di Osaka"
- With Fabio Concato - "Bambino mio – Fatto per un mondo migliore – Petra"
- With Giorgio Conte - "Davvero propizio il giorno per il Toro e il Capricorno" (1993)
- With Grazia Di Michele - "Gli amori diversi"
- With Grazia Di Michele & Tosca - "Propositi" and "Voglio"
- With Kaballà - "Jorna senza data" – "Si fa sera" (1993)
- With Mario Amici - "Negli occhi e nelle mani" (1993)
- With Mario Rosini - "Una mano sul cuore"
- With Mike Francis - "Let Me In" (1984)
- With Renato Zero - "Non arrossire" (2005)
- With Sergio Endrigo - "Era d'estate" (2003)
- With Toquinho - "Gente sospesa" (1986)
- With Tosca - "Destino"
- With Zucchero - "Un piccolo aiuto"
- With Carmel McCourt - "You Are on My Mind"
