= Maria Rita (album) =

2003 studio album by Maria Rita

Studio album by Maria Rita
- Released: 9 September 2003; 13 April 2004 (Portugal)
- Recorded: May 19 – July 27, 2003
- Studios: Toca do Bandido, Rio de Janeiro
- Genre: Música popular brasileira
- Length: 55:09
- Label: Warner Music Brasil
- Producers: Tom Capone; Marco da Costa (co-producer); Maria Rita (co-producer)

Maria Rita chronology
Maria Rita (2003)	Segundo (2005)

Maria Rita is the debut album by Brazilian singer Maria Rita, released in 2003 by Warner Music Group. The album won the Latin Grammy Award for Best MPB Album.

== Background ==
The album was the debut work by Brazilian singer Maria Rita, the daughter of singer Elis Regina and arranger César Camargo Mariano. The singer served as the album's producer, in addition to production by Tom Capone and Marco da Costa. After working on Milton Nascimento's album Pietá, Maria Rita is the artist's first solo album. The album features songs written by Milton Nascimento, Rita Lee, Marcelo Camelo, Zélia Duncan, Cláudio Lins, and Lenine.

== Tracklist ==
No.	Title	Writer(s)	Length
1.	"A Festa"	Milton Nascimento	4:29
2.	"Agora Só Falta Você"	Rita Lee, Luís Sérgio Carlini	3:23
3.	"Menininha do Portão"	Nonato Buzar, Paulinho Tapajós	3:30
4.	"Não Vale a Pena"	Jean Garfunkel, Paulo Garfunkel	5:08
5.	"Dos Gardenias"	Isolina Carrillo	4:35
6.	"Cara Valente"	Marcelo Camelo	4:51
7.	"Santa Chuva"	Marcelo Camelo	3:56
8.	"Menina da Lua"	Renato Motha	5:37
9.	"Encontros e Despedidas"	Milton Nascimento, Fernando Brant	4:02
10.	"Pagu"	Rita Lee, Zélia Duncan	3:52
11.	"Lavadeira do Rio"	Lenine, Bráulio Tavares	3:21
12.	"Veja Bem Meu Bem"	Marcelo Camelo	3:10
13.	"Cupido"	Cláudio Lins	7:37
14.	"Vero" (Bonus track, made available for download via the CD's interactive feature)	Natan Marques, Murilo Antunes
15.	"Estrela, Estrela" (Bonus track, made available for download via the CD's interactive feature)	Vitor Ramil

== Release ==
The album was released on CD in 2003, with a release concert at the Mistura Fina nightclub, located in Jardim Botânico, in the southern part of Rio de Janeiro. The album sold more than 1 million copies in the country and was certified triple platinum. The song Encontro e Despedidas became the theme song for the soap opera Senhora do Destino, aired on TV Globo, written by Aguinaldo Silva and starring Susana Vieira and Renata Sorrah.

In 2024, NRC Records released a vinyl version of the album.

== Reception ==
=== Critical ===
Journalist and music critic Tárik de Souza wrote a positive review of the singer's album in his column to Jornal do Brasil newspaper, calling it “a more than promising debut” and praising the artist's musical DNA.

Journalist Fernando Barros e Silva, writing for the Folha de S. Paulo newspaper, praised the album and noted that “Many children of more or less famous singers follow this path. The result, more often than not, is embarrassing or irrelevant. That is not the case here. Not only because Elis is, without a doubt, the Pelé of Brazilian female singers, but also because Maria Rita really can sing, and very well.”

=== Prizes ===
The album was nominated for the 2004 Multishow Brazilian Music Awards, organized by the Multishow network. In the Best CD category, the album was nominated but lost to Marcelo D2’s À Procura da Batida Perfeita. She was also nominated for a Latin Grammy in the Best MPB Album category, where she took home the award.

Year	Prize	Category	Venue	Result	Ref.
2004	Multishow Brazilian Music Awards	Best CD	Theatro Municipal, Rio de Janeiro, Rio de Janeiro, Brazil	Nominated	
2004	Latin Grammy Awards	Best MPB album	Shrine Auditorium and Expo Hall, Los Angeles, Nevada, United States	Won	

== Legacy ==
In a poll conducted in May 2022, the album ranked 318th on a list of the 500 best Brazilian albums, according to a survey of more than 160 music experts conducted by the Discoteca Básica podcast. It was the only album by Maria Rita to be mentioned in the poll.

In 2023, journalist and music critic Mauro Ferreira, in a post on his blog on the G1 website, praised the singer’s debut album, noting that “the effects of the hurricane are still felt in Brazilian music” and calling it “an unforgettable debut.”

== Personnel ==
The following musicians contributed to the album:

- Maria Rita – vocals, handclaps
- Tom Capone – banjo, acoustic guitar, viola, pandeiro, tamborim
- Tiago Costa – piano, Fender Rhodes, organ, accordion, keyboards
- Marco da Costa – drums, surdo
- Fábio Sá – double bass
- Jorge Helder – double bass
- Dener de Castro Campolina – double bass
- Giba Pinto – electric bass
- Marcelo Mariano – electric bass
- Marcus Teixeira – acoustic guitar
- Léo Leobons – percussion, congas, bongos
- Mestre DaLua – percussion
- Bocato – trombone
- Glauco Fernandes – violin
- Pedro Mibielli – violin
- Carlos Roberto Mendes – violin
- Erasmo Carlos Fernandes Júnior – violin
- Marluce Ferreira – violin
- José Rogério Rosa – violin
- Léo Fabrício Ortiz – violin
- Verônica Gassler – violin
- Jairo Diniz Silva – viola
- Eduardo Roberto Pereira – viola
- Marcelo Isdebski Salles – cello
- Hugo Pilger – cello
