= Anna Júlia =

Single by Los Hermanos

from the album Los Hermanos
- Released: 1999
- Recorded: 1999
- Genre: Power pop
- Length: 3:32
- Label: Abril
- Songwriter: Marcelo Camelo

Los Hermanos singles chronology
"Anna Júlia" (1999)	"Primavera" (2000)

"Anna Júlia" is a song by Brazilian rock band Los Hermanos, first released on their 1999 self-titled debut album. It was their first mainstream hit.

== Composition ==
The lyrics were written by vocalist Marcelo Camelo about Anna Júlia Werneck, a journalism student at PUC-Rio, whom the band's producer Alex Werner was passionate about.

At the time of its release the song was a hit, and got constant airplay in Brazilian radio and television. Marcelo is the composer, singer and solo player of the biggest hit of Los Hermanos, the song Anna Julia, which was later covered by Jim Capaldi (ex-Traffic) in an English-language version, featuring Capaldi, Deep Purple's Ian Paice on drums, The Jam's Paul Weller in bass and the Beatle George Harrison on solo guitar. The song was also recorded in Spanish by Los Hermanos, and in Italian by Daniele Groff.

After this initial success, Anna Julia gradually featured less in Los Hermanos' setlists. The band felt that the song, a radio ballad, did not represent the band's style, and was, according to Camelo himself, "a sticky song that the label made us play to exhaustion". This was part of the reason the band isolated themselves on a remote farm during production of their 2001 album, Bloco do Eu Sozinho, which featured a more produced sound.
