= In Between Dying =

2020 film

- Film poster
- Directed by: Hilal Baydarov
- Written by: Hilal Baydarov; Rəşad Səfər
- Produced by: Elşən Abbasov; Hilal Baydarov; Carlos Reygadas; Joslyn Barnes
- Starring: Orxan İskəndərli; Rəna Əsgərova; Məryəm Nağıyeva; Mürvət Əbdüləzizov; Hüseyn Nasirov; Kamran Hüseynov; Samir Abbasov
- Cinematography: Elşən Abbasov
- Edited by: Hilal Baydarov
- Music by: Kənan Rüstəmli
- Production companies: Ucqar Film; Splendor Omnia; Louverture Films
- Release date: 10 September 2020 (Venice)
- Running time: 88 minutes
- Countries: Azerbaijan; Mexico; United States
- Language: Azerbaijani

In Between Dying (Azerbaijani: Səpələnmiş ölümlər arasında) is a 2020 internationally co-produced road drama film co-written, edited and directed by Hilal Baydarov. It was also co-produced by Carlos Reygadas and Joslyn Barnes, while Danny Glover and Susan Cohn Rockefeller serve as executive producers through their company Louverture Films. The film was selected to be shown in the main competition section of the 77th Venice International Film Festival.

== Cast ==
- Orxan İskəndərli as Davud
- Rəna Əsgərova as Bride
- Məryəm Nağıyeva as Davud's Mother
- Mürvət Əbdüləzizov as The Doctor
- Hüseyn Nasirov as Gusi
- Kamran Hüseynov as İsa
- Samir Abbasov as Musa
- Kübra Şükürova as Rabid Girl
- Nərmin Həsənova as İlahə
- Oqtay Namazov as Drunken Husband
- Gülarə Hüseynova as Şəms
- Pərviz Isagov as Cemo
- Gülnaz İsmayılova as Blind Girl's Mother
