= Rodrigo Amarante =

Brazilian guitarist, bassist, singer, songwriter and arranger

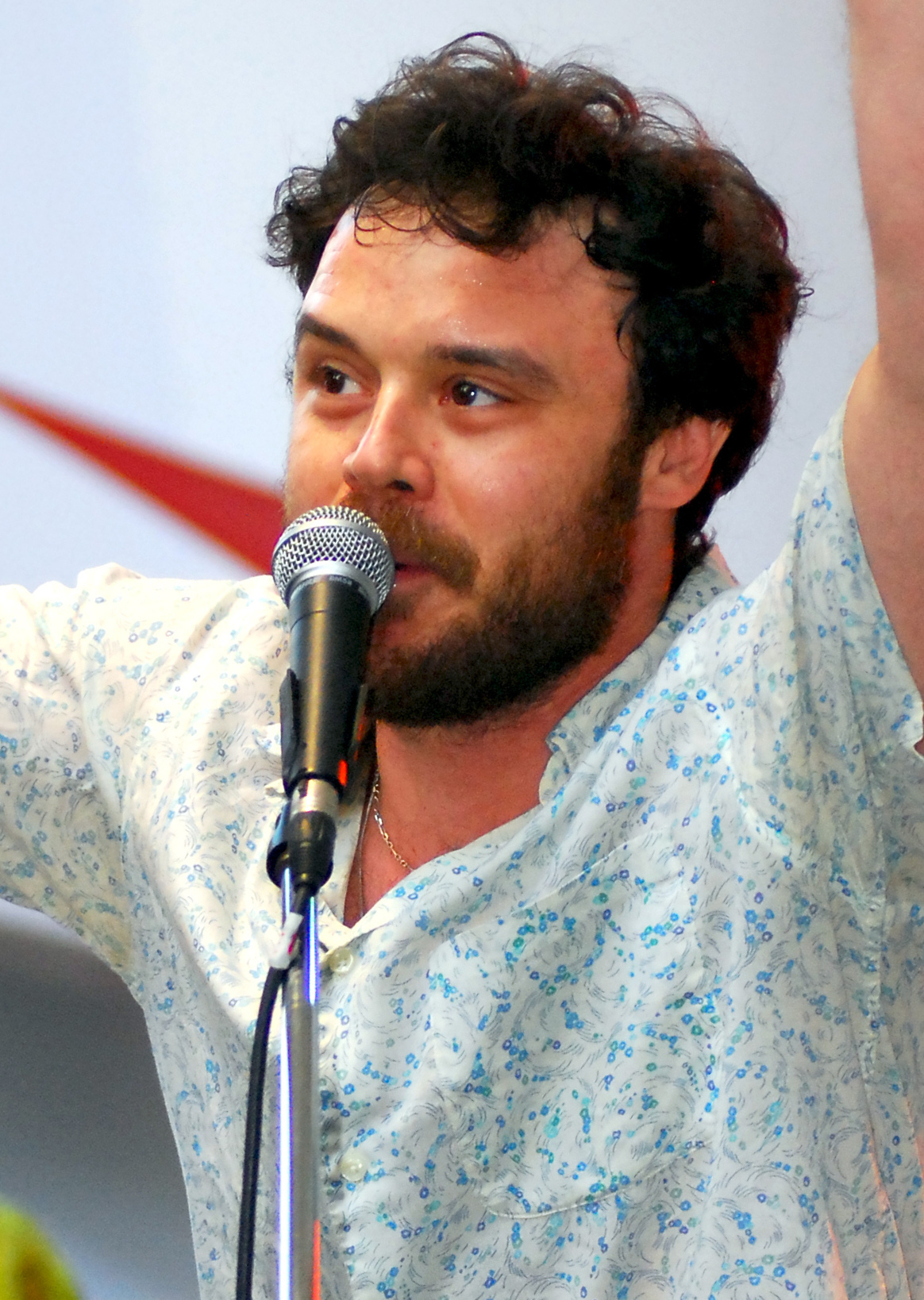
- Amarante in 2008

Background information
- Born: Rodrigo Amarante de Castro Neves; 6 September 1976 (age 50); Rio de Janeiro, Brazil
- Genres: Folk rock, psychedelic folk, MPB, samba, acoustic, experimental
- Instruments: Vocals, guitar, piano, bass
- Years active: 1997–present
- Labels: Rough Trade Records, Easy Sound Recording Co., Mais Um Discos, Som Livre, Sony BMG,
- Member of: Los Hermanos; Orquestra Imperial; Little Joy
- Website: rodrigoamarante.com

Rodrigo Amarante de Castro Neves (born 6 September 1976) is a Brazilian singer-songwriter, multi-instrumentalist, composer and arranger. He is part of the bands Los Hermanos, Orquestra Imperial, and Little Joy, and released his first solo record, Cavalo, in Brazil in late 2013 and worldwide in May 2014. He also wrote and performed the (bolero style) narcocorrido "Tuyo", the theme song for the Netflix Original Series Narcos (2015) and Narcos: Mexico (2018), and wrote the two film scores: Entebbe (2018) & His Three Daughters (2024).

== Biography ==
=== 1997–2007: Los Hermanos ===
Amarante was born in Rio de Janeiro. He studied Journalism at Pontifical Catholic University of Rio de Janeiro ("PUC-Rio"), where he met Marcelo Camelo and Rodrigo Barba. After a few rehearsals with Los Hermanos, Amarante was invited to join the band.

On their debut album, Los Hermanos (1999), Amarante contributed very little, playing transverse flute and singing the backing vocals. There are only two songs written by him: "Quem Sabe", which turned out to be one of the CD's singles, and "Onze Dias".

On the band's second album, Bloco do Eu Sozinho (2001), Amarante was able to show his real musical quality, playing guitar together with Marcelo and writing more songs. He recorded "Sentimental" (considered by Dado Villa-Lobos from Legião Urbana to be the best song of 2001), "Retrato pra Iaiá", and "Cher Antoine" (sung in French). He also co-wrote with Marcelo "A Flor", one of the album's hits, and the instrumental part of the song "Mais Uma Canção".

With their third album, Ventura (2003), came Amarante's national recognition as a great songwriter; he wrote songs of indisputable quality, like "Último Romance", "O velho e o moço", "Um par", "Do Sétimo Andar", and "Deixa o Verão". His role as a sideman in the band ended, and he became recognized as one of the band's leaders, which role until then was attributed only to Marcelo Camelo.

On the group's fourth album, 4 (2005), Amarante wrote almost as many songs as Marcelo. Although 4 did not have as much success as the previous album, Amarante's songs are much more distinguished, like "O Vento" – the only hit in this album – and "Condicional". He also wrote "Primeiro Andar", "Os Pássaros", and "Paquetá" (Paquetá is a small island in Rio de Janeiro).

In 2006, Amarante won the prize of "Best Instrumentalist" in the Prêmio Multishow (Multishow Awards).

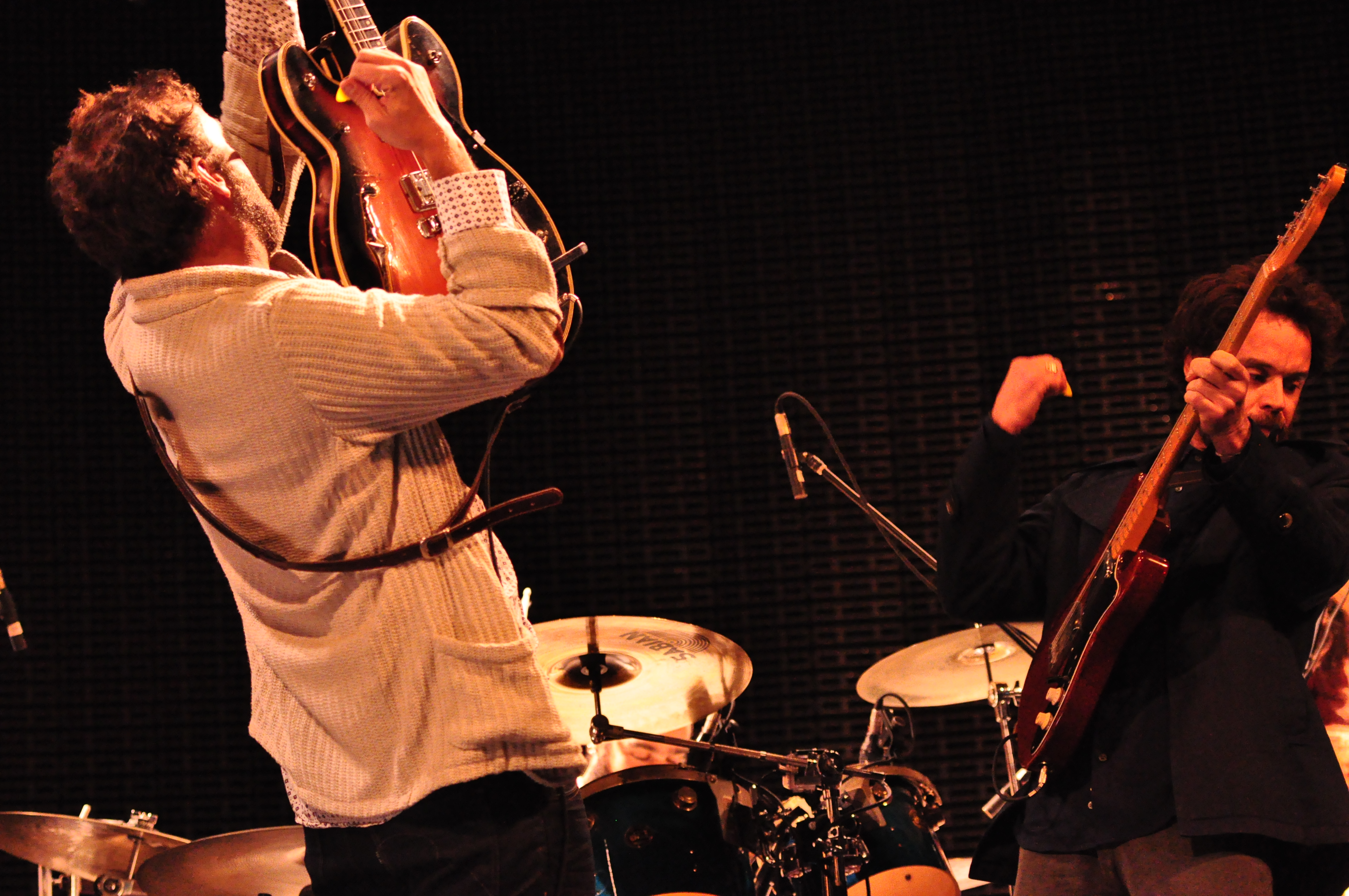
Amarante and Camelo playing guitar at Los Hermanos concert in 2013

In April 2007 the band announced they were going on hiatus, since 2009, the band has been gathering from years to years for concerts and musical tours.

=== 2002–2006: Orquestra Imperial ===
After a hiatus from Los Hermanos (in 2007), Amarante dedicated himself to Orquestra Imperial (a band in which he plays with Moreno Veloso (Caetano Veloso's son), Nina Becker, and the actress Thalma de Freitas) and went to California to record "Smokey Rolls Down Thunder Canyon" with Devendra Banhart. There, he started writing songs with Fabrizio Moretti and Binki Shapiro, a trio that would soon become Little Joy.

=== 2006–2010: Little Joy ===
In 2007, Amarante joined with The Strokes drummer Fabrizio Moretti and American musician, singer, and songwriter Binki Shapiro to form the trio Little Joy, a Brazilian/American rock supergroup. Amarante and Moretti had met in 2006, at a festival in Lisbon where both their bands were performing, and the idea came up to start a new musical project unrelated to their respective bands. When Amarante came to work in Los Angeles with Devendra Banhart on his 2007 album Smokey Rolls Down Thunder Canyon they renewed the acquaintance and started making music, then Binki was brought on board. Little Joy was signed to Rough Trade Records label.

=== 2010–present: Solo works ===
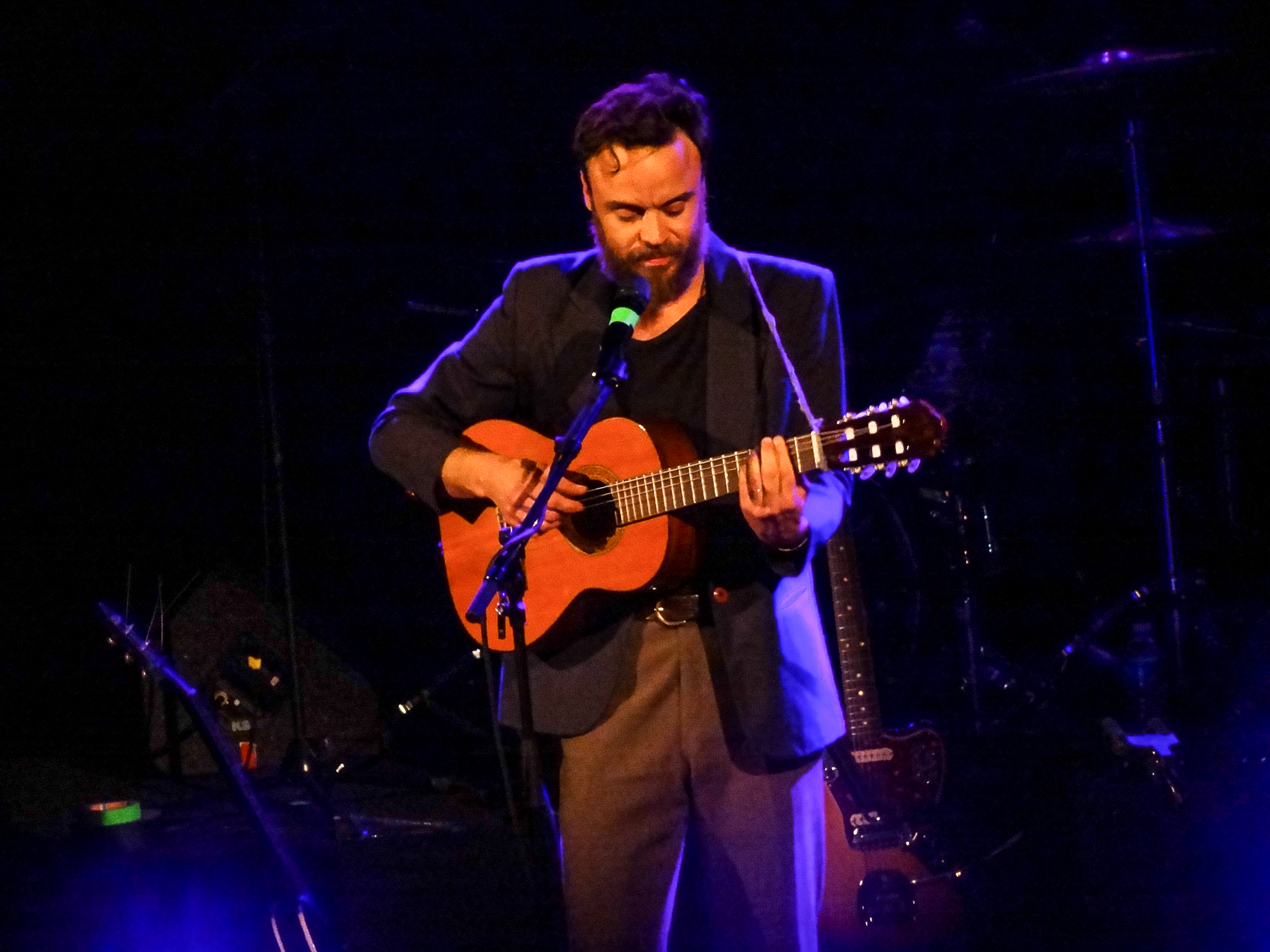
Amarante performing in 2013

In 2014, Amarante released his first solo album, Cavalo, one of the first releases on the Easy Sounds Recording Company label. The album received strong critical reviews and featured as one of NPR Music's "50 Favourite Songs of 2014 So Far". He performed the album on tour in nearly 30 different countries.

In 2015, Amarante wrote and vocalized the Spanish-language song, "Tuyo"("Yours"), as the opening theme for the Netflix Original series Narcos. He was inspired by the thought of what kind of music Pablo Escobar's mother would have listened to when raising her son. The song debuted at No. 6 on the Latin Pop Digital Songs around the 2015 series premiere and was nominated for a Primetime Emmy Award for Outstanding Main Title Theme Music.

== Collaborations ==
Amarante composed the song "Olá Rubi" ("Hello, Ruby") on the album Rádio Alegria (released in November 2007), by the Portuguese band Os Azeitonas. The lyrics were written by Mário Brandão, vocalist of Os Azeitonas. The original name of the song was "Tema Castanho".

After in 2008, on the album Maré by Adriana Calcanhotto, as an arranger and instrumentalist, on the album Na Confraria das Sedutoras by 3 Na Massa, as composer of "Tatuí" and sung by his ex-wife Karine Carvalho. On the album Minor Love by Adam Green as an instrumentalist. In 2012, "NYC Subway Poetry Department" with Tom Zé in his record Tropicália Lixo Lógico and "Azul" with Natalia Lafourcade as a singer in her record Mujer Divina – Homenaje a Agustín Lara. On the album Gilbertos Sambas in 2014 by Gilberto Gil as an arranger and instrumentalist. In 2017, Rodrigo Amarante with Marcelo Camelo recording producer and engineer, instrumentation the album Vem by Mallu Magalhães. On the album Sinais do Sim by Paralamas do Sucesso he collaborated. He appears singing in video City Music of Kevin Morby.

On the albums Smokey Rolls Down Thunder Canyon, What Will We Be, and Mala by Devendra Banhart (as an instrumentalist and as a singer of the song "Rosa" on Smokey Rolls Down Thunder Canyon). "Nu Com A Minha Música" with Marisa Monte and Devendra Banhart for the Red Hot Organization's most recent charitable album Red Hot+Rio 2; the album is a follow-up to Red Hot + Rio (1996). Sales proceeds will be donated to raise awareness and money to combat AIDS/HIV and related health and social issues. "O Que Se Quer" written and arranged with Marisa Monte (in her record O Que Você Quer Saber de Verdade)

== Personal life ==
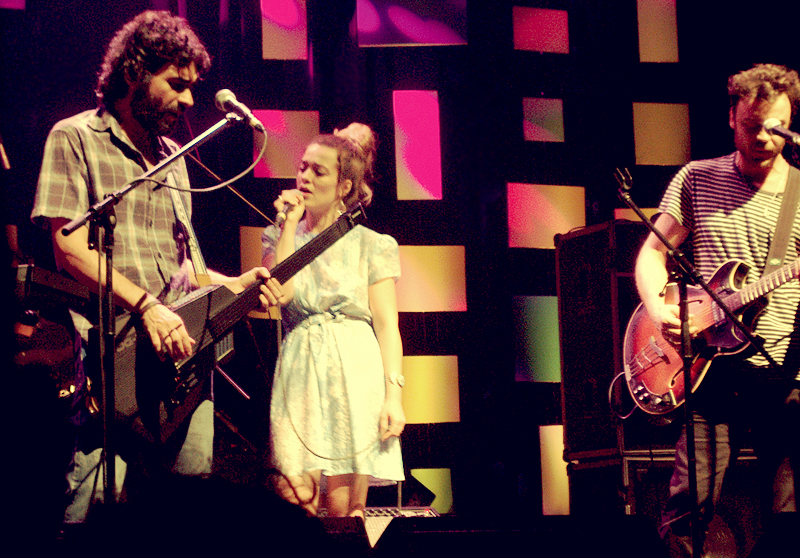
Amarante performing with wife Karine Carvalho in 2009.

Rodrigo married actress Karine Carvalho in 2002. Amarante and Carvalho divorced in 2010.

Since 2008, Amarante has largely resided in the United States, notably Los Angeles, California

== Discography ==
=== With Los Hermanos ===
- Los Hermanos (1999)
- Bloco do Eu Sozinho (2001)
- Ventura (2003)
- 4 (2005)

=== With Little Joy ===
- Little Joy (2008)

=== As a solo artist ===
- Cavalo (2013)
- Drama (2021)

=== Soundtracks ===
- "Tuyo" (2015) on the Narcos (Netflix Original series) Soundtrack
- 7 Days in Entebbe (2018) - Film composing debut
- His Three Daughters (2024)

== See also ==
- Narcocorrido
