= Sentimental (Los Hermanos song) =

Single by Los Hermanos

from the album Bloco do Eu Sozinho
- Released: 2001
- Recorded: 2001
- Genre: Alternative rock, indie rock
- Length: 5:09
- Label: Abril Music and Bertelsmann Music Group
- Songwriter(s): Rodrigo Amarante
- Producer(s): Alexandre Kassin

Los Hermanos singles chronology
"A Flor" (2001)	"Sentimental" (2001)	"Fingi na Hora Rir" (2002)

"Sentimental" is the second single extracted from the album "Bloco do Eu Sozinho" band Los Hermanos. It is the second song signed by the singer Rodrigo Amarante to consider working range. The first was "Quem Sabe", the debut album "Los Hermanos", 1999.

== Video clip ==
The band won a conceptual video clip in black and white and shot in film, directed by Nilson Primitivo and Sergio Barbosa Lutz, same directors of the first documentary about the band, called "Ventura", 2005. The clip follows a non-linear script, based on a short film guitarist Rodrigo Amarante, called "Jorge Manager", camouflaging the band on ordinary occasions. The protagonist is the director himself Nilson Primitivo. Although respected, the clip did not have a good number of views on music programming, for the album "Bloco do Eu Sozinho" was facing internal problems with the then Abril Music label regarding the disclosure of their working groups.
