= Orquestra Imperial =

Brazilian big band

- Origin: Rio de Janeiro; Brazil
- Genres: Gafiera Big Band; Samba; Brazilian
- Years active: 2002–present
- Label: Som Livre Totolo
- Members: Bartolo, Berna Ceppas, Bidu, Bodão, Domenico Lancellotti, Felipe Pinaud, Kassin, Leo Monteiro, Mauro Zacharias, Max Sete, Moreno Veloso, Nélson Jacobina, Nina Becker, Pedro Sá, Rodrigo Amarante, Rubinho Jacobina, Stephane San Juan, Thalma de Freitas, Wilson das Neves
- Website: http://orquestraimperial.com.br/

Orquestra Imperial is a Brazilian Big Band formed in 2002 with the objective of recreating the typical Gafieira Samba sound. The group brought together notable names from the new Carioca pop scene such as Rodrigo Amarante (from the group Los Hermanos), Moreno Veloso, Domenico Lancellotti and Kassin (from the +2 project), Nina Becker, Thalma de Freitas, Max Sette and Rubinho Jacobina with experienced musicians like Nélson Jacobina (the composer of the Império Serrana) and the samba percussionist and singer Wilson das Neves. Other musicians who have contributed to the Orquestra include Berna Ceppas, Rodrigo Bartolo (who plays with Arnaldo Antunes and Duplexx), Pedro Sá (Caetano Veloso’s guitarist), Bidu Cordeiro (who accompanied the Paralamas do Sucesso and Reggae B) and DJ Marlboro who has gained the title of official Orquestra Imperial DJ.

== History ==
The project began initially with the aim of performing a show in the defunct Ballroom venue in Rio de Janeiro and was started by Berna Ceppas, Kassin and Seu Jorge. With time, new members such as Nina Becker joined the Orquestra after first performing live with them. The bands repertoire consisted of classic samba tunes and unusual covers such as Vem Fazer Glu-glu originally sung by the presenter Sergio Mallandro, and Owner of a Lonely Heart by English progressive rock group Yes. They also played unknown compositions like Artista é o Caralho by Rubinho Jacobina and Gomalina, by Max Sete. They occasionally invited guests on stage and these have included Ed Motta, Marcelo Camelo, Fernanda Abreu, Andreas Kisser, Elza Soares amongst others. One of the causes of Orquestra Imperial’s success was the presence of Rodrigo Amarante, guitarist and vocalist of the rock band Los Hermanos, who introduced fans of his band to the Orquestra and helped to popularise the Orquestra on the alternative scene.

== 2006 ==
In 2006 the band recorded an EP consisting of three recordings and an instrumental track: Me Deixa Em Paz, Obsessão, Popcorn and Sem Compromisso. In the same year their first album Carnaval Só Ano Que Vem, was recorded and distributed by the Brazilian label Som Livre. In 2006, they became known in the international scene, appearing in Portugal at the Festival do Sudoeste, and their first US tour playing venues such as Montclair State University, in New Jersey and Chicago’s Millennium Park. In February 2006 they also participated alongside Caetano Veloso and other Brazilian acts at the Tropicalismo festival to celebrate the Tropicália movement in 1960s Brazil.

== 2007 ==
Carnaval Só No Ano Que Vem was released internationally on 8 October by Totolo. The band also appeared as a backing band on Bebel Gilberto's 2007 album Momento, playing on the song Tranquilo written by Kassin. Orquestra Imperial have since played many shows in Brazil and were featured on the BBC Four documentary Brasil Brasil which aired in November 2007 and charted the history of Brazilian music.
