= Marcelo Camelo =

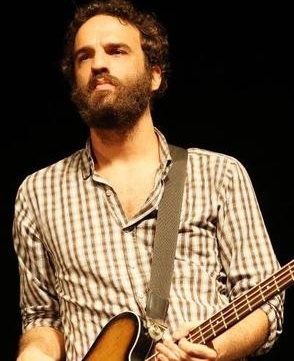
- Born: February 4, 1978 (age 48); Rio de Janeiro, Brazil
- Education: Pontifical Catholic University of Rio de Janeiro
- Occupations: Singer-songwriter; writer; poet; playwright
- Years active: 1997–present
- Spouse: Mallu Magalhães (m. 2012)
- Musical career
- Genres: Folk rock; alternative rock; MPB; Samba; Bossa Nova; acoustic music; contemporary classical
- Instruments: Vocals, guitar, bass
- Labels: Abril Music; Sony BMG
- Member of: Banda do Mar
- Formerly of: Los Hermanos
- Website: marcelocamelo.com

Marcelo de Souza Camelo (Rio de Janeiro, February 4, 1978) is a Brazilian composer, singer, guitarist, and poet. He is best known as composer and lead guitarist of the Brazilian band Los Hermanos. Since the end of the band, he continues composing for many interpreters, mainly Maria Rita and Ivete Sangalo. In 2008, his first solo CD, "Sou", was released.

== Biography ==
=== Early life ===
Son of Ernesto Camelo and naïve painter Ana Camelo, Marcelo was born in the city of Rio de Janeiro, having grown up in Jacarepaguá, west of the city, where he lived until he was fifteen. He is the eldest son of the couple whose younger brother is the writer Thiago Camelo. Besides his country his family was formed mostly by artists, musicians writers among others, like his uncle Bebeto Castilho. He had his first contacts with rock when he became a fan of hard-rock band Bon Jovi, Poison and Skid Row. From a young age he had learned to play keyboard, drums and guitar.

His touch with alternative rock would be in his college days, when he actively participated in a fanzine with Alex Werner called DooStraw, a Doo junction reference to the Pixies Doolittle album with the straw word, due to drawings made by Alexandre Kassin, at the time a member of the band Acabou La Tequila, one of the greatest musical influences of Camelo, and other bands like Little Quail and The Mad Birds, Planet Hemp, Ratos de Porão, Gangrena Gasosa, Pato Fu.

=== 1997–2007: Los Hermanos ===
Was studying journalism at the Pontifical Catholic University of Rio de Janeiro (PUC-RJ), Marcelo Camelo started the first contacts with the stage, having formed the band Drive By, Barnabas and Minanina's Popcorn before starting the formation of the band was to be called Los Hermanos. Until then students from PUC-RJ, Marcelo Camelo and Rodrigo Barba formed a band that contrasted the weight of hardcore with the lightness of lyrics about love. With the arrival of musicians Bruno Medina, Rodrigo Amarante and Patrick Laplan, the band recorded their first material in 1997: the demos "Chora" and "Amor e Folia".

In 1999, Marcelo Camelo released the first album of the band Los Hermanos having written twelve of the fourteen tracks of the album. The success of the album was pulled by the song "Anna Júlia", that was conquered worldwide expression and also with English version of Jim Capaldi and the second single, "Spring". In the delivery of the 2000 Multishow prize, Marcelo Camelo was embarrassed to win Chico Buarque in the best music category, with "Anna Julia". Ashamed, he said, "Man, I do not even know what to say. I feel ashamed to win a prize in a category where Chico Buarque is competing."

Two years later, in 2001, bassist Patrick Laplan disintegrated the band, claiming musical differences and the group released the album "Bloco do Eu Sozinho", adding melancholy songs from Samba, Bossa Nova and other Latin rhythms. The guitarist Rodrigo Amarante, now has more space in the band, with compositions such as "Retrato Pra Iaiá", the single "Sentimental", "Cher Antoine" and "A Flor" with Marcelo Camelo who composed "Todo Carnaval tem seu Fim" As the album's first single.

The year 2003 arrived and already in Sony Music BMG, the Los Hermanos released the album "Ventura". Formerly called "Bonança", it was the first Brazilian album to "leak" in its pre-production phase. The third album featured a Los Hermanos multi-faceted. In Marcelo's compositions from "Samba a Dois" to pop rock from "O Vencedor" or from "Conversa de Botas Batidas" and "Do Lado de Dentro" dialogues, "Ventura" came with album status that would consolidate the band into the scene national. The first single, "Cara Estranho" followed by "O Vencedor" and "Último Romance", the latter by Rodrigo Amarante, who signed five of the fifteen songs of the CD and came to stand out as a composer of the scene. The singer Maria Rita in her homonymous album, recorded three songs of Marcelo Camelo: "Santa Chuva", "Cara Valente" and "Veja Bem Meu Bem". The shows now housed a legion of fans who became the trademark of the band.

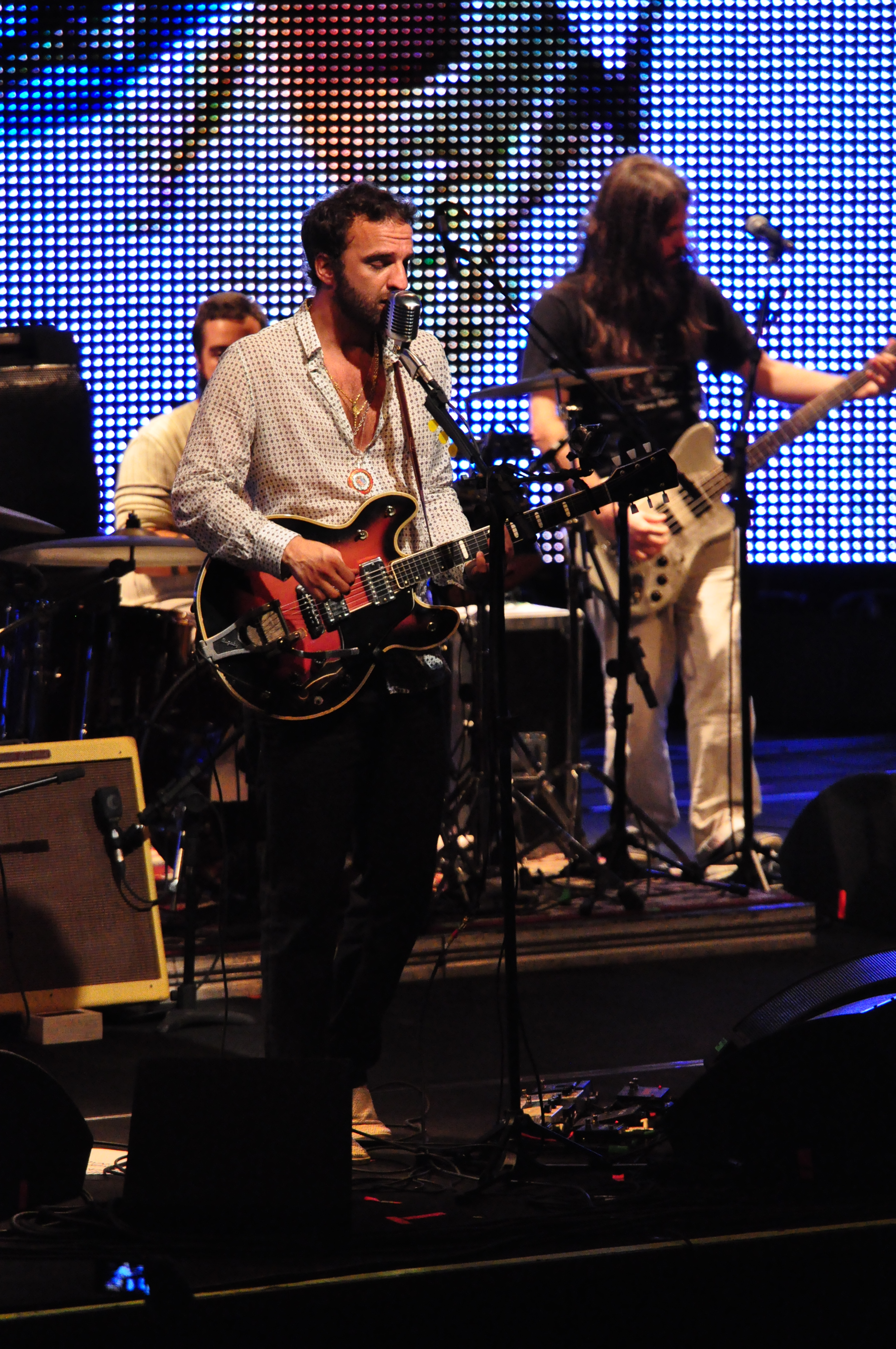
Camelo with Los Hermanos from Porto Alegre, 2012.

In 2005, the fourth CD of the band, "4", arrived, the album showed a more introspective content and a more impactful approach with MPB. The disc, however, would be considered "irregular" by the great critic. Whether it was in the "Sapato Novo" guitar and the bossa of "Fez se Mar", or the predominance of a nostalgic mood in the lyrics of Camelo and Amarante, "4" divided the audience again. The album had as a single of quite repercussion the song "O Vento" of the guitarist Rodrigo Amarante. They followed this single "Condicional" and "Morena", both songs with clips released at the same time.

Later Bloco do Eu Sozinho and Ventura, respectively, in 2001 and 2003. These two albums appear in the list elaborated by the magazine Rolling Stone of the 100 biggest discs of the Brazilian music.

In April 2007 the band announced they were going on hiatus, since 2009, the band has been gathering from years to years for concerts and musical tours. Until the beginning of 2007, Marcelo maintained a blog in the electronic channel G1 of Globo.com. On the site, Camelo tried to appropriate different ways of posting chronicles and poems, such as typed texts or even manuscripts.

=== 2007–present: solo career ===
After Los Hermanos announced the band's hiatus, the composer released his first album entitled Sou (in English: "I am"). The album which features a cover-poem by artist Rodrigo Linares was first launched on the Internet, through the Sonora site at Terra Networks portal. The album features 14 tracks composed by Marcelo Camelo, two performed exclusively by pianist Clara Sverner, a guest artist in the recording. Besides her, Mallu Magalhães and accordion player Dominguinhos are also present on the album. The song Janta, which has the participation of Mallu, was listed by Brazilian Rolling Stone as the best track of 2008.

In April 2010 the tracks for what would be the second album of studio of Marcelo's solo career was in the final process of recording and Marcelo himself had already announced that the dc unnamed point would be released in three months. However Camelo decided to change everything and moved to São Paulo lived with his wife and returned to his old town Rio de Janeiro he says after handling titled Toque Dela: "To my demands, I was missing another type of aesthetic I made a strategic stop to hear what he had written. He brought [the tracks] to Rio, and they sound totally different here and in Sao Paulo. Already on the plane disk is changing. "

=== 2013–present: Banda do Mar ===
After moving to Lisbon with his wife Mallu Magalhães, they joined the drummer Fred Ferreira to form Banda do Mar, releasing their first album eponymous in late 2014.

His album Sinfonia Primitiva Nº 1 was ranked as the 43rd best Brazilian album of 2018 by the Brazilian edition of Rolling Stone magazine.

== Personal life ==
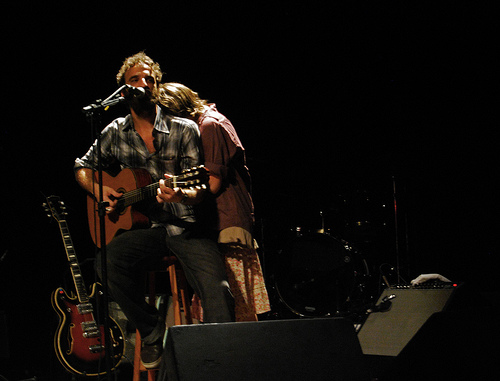
Marcelo Camelo and his wife Mallu Magalhães in 2008.

Marcelo is married to composer and singer Mallu Magalhães. They are bandmates in Banda do Mar. In 2015, they had their first child, called Luísa, and now live in Portugal.

== Discography ==
=== With Los Hermanos ===
- Los Hermanos (1999)
- Bloco do Eu Sozinho (2001)
- Ventura (2003)
- 4 (2005)

=== As a solo artist ===
- Sou (2008)
- MTV ao Vivo: Marcelo Camelo (2010)
- Toque Dela (2011)
- Mormaço (2013)
- Sinfonia nº 1 – Primitiva (2018)

=== With Banda do Mar ===
- Banda do Mar (2014)

== See also ==
- Los Hermanos
- Mallu Magalhães
