= Sou (album) =

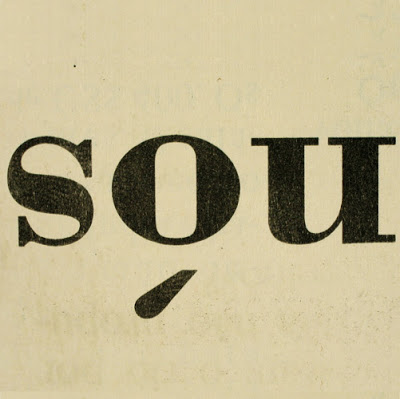

Studio album by Marcelo Camelo
- Released: 8 September 2008
- Genre: Indie, MPB
- Length: 51:54
- Label: Sony BMG; Zé Pereira
- Producer: Marcelo Camelo

Marcelo Camelo chronology
Sou (2008)	Toque Dela (2011)

Singles from Sou
- 1. "Doce Solidão" Released: March 6, 2008

Sou (Portuguese for: 'I am') is a debut studio album by Brazilian singer Marcelo Camelo, lead singer of the band Los Hermanos, released in 2008.

Professional ratings
Review scores
Source	Rating
CanalPop	2/5 stars
The Music Box	2.5/5 stars

== Track listing ==
No.	Title	Length
1.	"Téo e a Gaivota"	5:42
2.	"Tudo Passa"	3:49
3.	"Passeando"	2:04
4.	"Doce Solidão"	4:37
5.	"Janta"	3:25
6.	"Mais Tarde"	3:09
7.	"Menina Bordada"	4:38
8.	"Liberdade"	3:55
9.	"Saudade"	4:28
10.	"Santa Chuva"	4:15
11.	"Copacabana"	2:39
12.	"Vida Doce"	5:25
13.	"Saudade (Bonus)"	4:28
14.	"Passeando (Bonus)"	2:04
Total length:		51:54
