= 4 (Los Hermanos album) =

Studio album by Los Hermanos
- Released: July 25, 2005
- Recorded: May 2, 2005 – June 29, 2005
- Studio: Estudios Monaural in Rio de Janeiro
- Genres: Indie rock; art rock; MPB
- Length: 46:02
- Label: Sony BMG
- Producer: Alexandre Kassin

Los Hermanos chronology
Ventura (2003)	4 (2005)	Perfil (Los Hermanos album) (2006)

Professional ratings
Review scores
Source	Rating
Allmusic	4/5 stars
Omelete	4/5 stars
The Music Box	4.5/5 stars

4 is the fourth album of the Los Hermanos band, released in 2005. The album was certified gold by the Brazilian Association of Record Producers after 50,000 copies were sold.

== Track listing ==
No.	Title	Writer(s)	Length
1.	"Dois Barcos"	Marcelo Camelo	4:40
2.	"Primeiro Andar"	Rodrigo Amarante	4:18
3.	"Fez-se Mar"	Marcelo Camelo	4:13
4.	"Paquetá"	Rodrigo Amarante	3:00
5.	"Os Pássaros"	Rodrigo Amarante	3:53
6.	"Morena"	Marcelo Camelo	3:10
7.	"O Vento"	Rodrigo Amarante	3:33
8.	"Horizonte Distante"	Marcelo Camelo	3:36
9.	"Condicional"	Rodrigo Amarante	3:28
10.	"Sapato Novo"	Marcelo Camelo	4:13
11.	"Pois É"	Marcelo Camelo	3:24
12.	"É de Lágrima"	Marcelo Camelo	4:30
Total length:			46:02

== Personnel ==
=== Los Hermanos ===
- Marcelo Camelo – Vocals, Guitar
- Rodrigo Amarante – Vocals, Guitar
- Rodrigo Barba – Drums
- Bruno Medina – Musical keyboard

=== Additional musicians ===
- Gabriel Bubu – Guitar, bass
- Fernando Catatau – Guitar on "Fez-se Mar"
- Jota Moraes – Vibraphone on "Sapato Novo"
- Carlos Malta – Baritone Saxophone on "Horizonte Distante"
- Eduardo Morelenbaum – Arranger, Clarinet
- Lucia Morelenbaum – Clarinet
- Paschoal Perrota – Arranger
- Stephane San Juan – Percussion
- Aloysio Fagerland – Basson
- Ifraim de Carvalho – Basson
- Vittor Santos – Trombone
- Aldivas Ayres – Trombone
- Ismael de Oliveira – Trumpet
- Francisco Soares – Trumpet
- Jésse Sadoc Filho – Trumpet

=== Production ===
- Alexandre Kassin – producer, audio mixer, engineer
- Daniel Carvalho – audio mixer
- Ricardo Garcia – mastering
- Simon Fuller – Executive Producer
- Luizão Dantas – Studio Assistant
- Igor Ferreira – Studio Assistant
- Fernando Fischgold – Studio Assistant
- Leonardo Moreira – Studio Assistant

=== Design ===
- Bruno Batista – art direction, design
- Daniela Conolly – art supervisor
- Sandro Mesquita – Graphic Coordinator

== Certifications ==
Region	Certification	Sales/Shipments
Brazil – ABPD	Gold	100.000
