= Los Hermanos (album) =

Studio album by Los Hermanos
- Released: 1999
- Genre: Alternative rock; ska punk; melodic hardcore
- Length: 33:59
- Label: Abril Music
- Producer: Rodrigo Castanho

Los Hermanos chronology
Los Hermanos (1999)	Bloco do Eu Sozinho (2001)

Los Hermanos is the debut studio album by the rock band Los Hermanos. It was released in 1999 on Abril Music.

== Track listing ==
No.	Title	English title	Length
1.	"Tenha Dó" (Marcelo Camelo)	"Have Pity"	3:27
2.	"Descoberta" (Marcelo Camelo)	"Discovery"	2:30
3.	"Anna Júlia" (Marcelo Camelo)		3:32
4.	"Quem Sabe" (Rodrigo Amarante)	"Who Knows"	2:32
5.	"Pierrot" (Marcelo Camelo)		2:47
6.	"Azedume" (Marcelo Camelo)	"Sour"	1:21
7.	"Lágrimas Sofridas" (Marcelo Camelo)	"Suffered Tears"	1:47
8.	"Primavera" (Marcelo Camelo)	"Spring"	4:22
9.	"Vai Embora" (Marcelo Camelo)	"Go Away"	2:10
10.	"Sem Ter Você" (Marcelo Camelo)	"Without You"	2:58
11.	"Onze Dias" (Rodrigo Amarante)	"Eleven Days"	1:43
12.	"Aline" (Marcelo Camelo)		1:25
13.	"Outro Alguem" (Marcelo Camelo)	"Another Someone"	2:30
14.	"Barbara" (Marcelo Camelo)		3:34
Total length:			33:59

== Personnel ==
- Marcelo Camelo – Vocals, guitar
- Rodrigo Amarante – Vocals, transverse flute
- Patrick Laplan – Bass guitar
- Rodrigo Barba – Drums
- Bruno Medina – Keyboards
- Rafael Ramos – Producer

== Additional musicians ==
- Mário Lúcio Gomes – Tenor Saxophone
- Sidnei Borgani – Trombone
- Nahor Gomes – Trumpet

== Special guests ==
- Roger Rocha Moreira ("Bárbara")
- Carlos Jazzma ("Pierrot")

== Certifications ==
Region	Certification	Sales/Shipments
Brazil – ABPD	Platinum	350.000
