= Gangrena Gasosa =

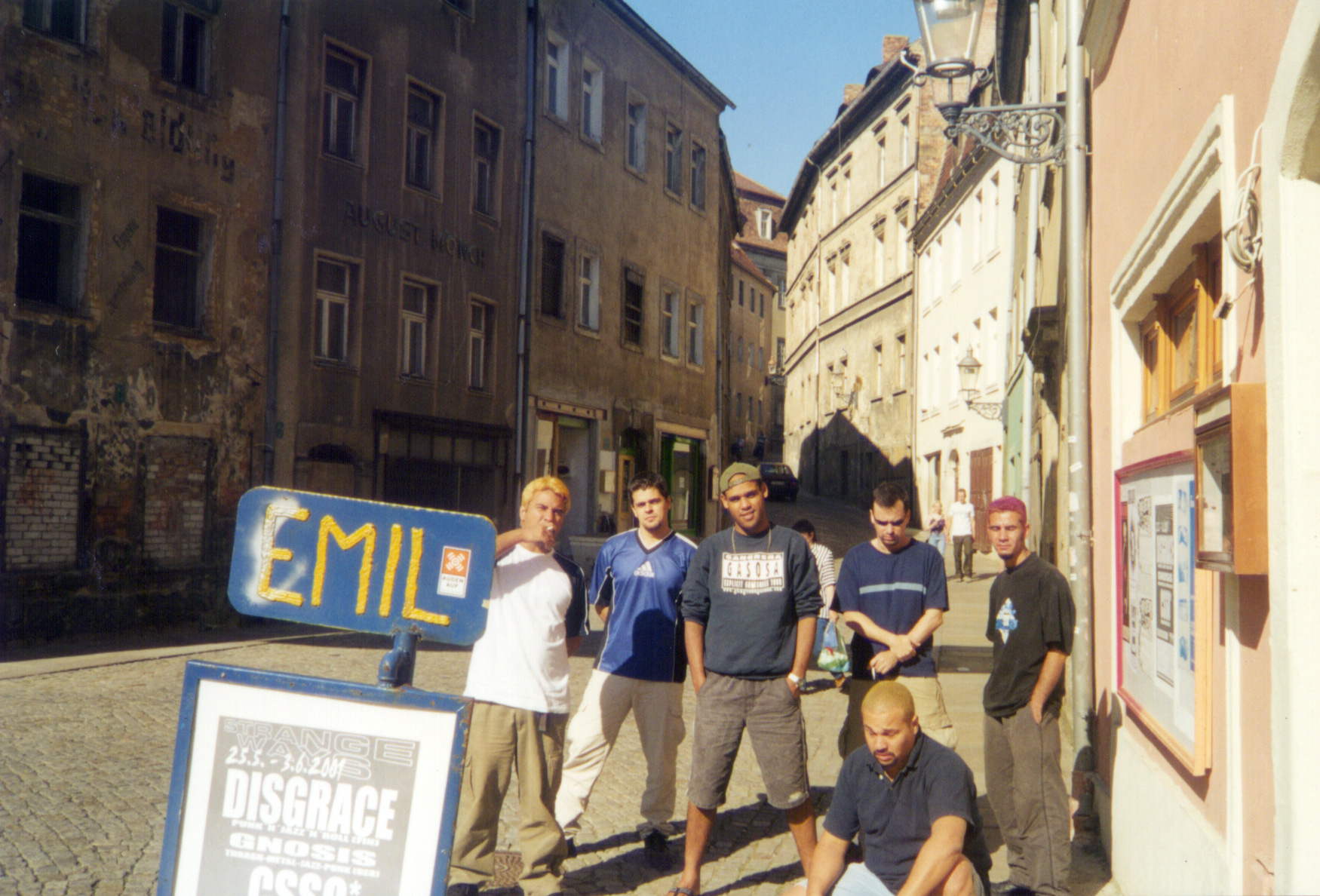
- Gangrena Gasosa during the Explicit Grossness European tour, 2001

Background information
- Origin: Rio de Janeiro, Brazil
- Genres: Thrash metal; hardcore punk; crossover thrash; saravá metal
- Years active: 1990–present
- Website: http://gangrenagasosa.com.br

Gangrena Gasosa is a Brazilian metal band from Rio de Janeiro known for incorporating elements of Umbanda and other Afro-Brazilian religions in their look and music. The band drew attention for each member representing a religion spirit or entity, dressing as such, and mixing crossover thrash with percussion and umbanda pontos, a mixture that was named by the band members as "saravá metal".

== Early days ==
After attending a Ratos de Porão concert in 1990, drummer Cid Mesquita and singer Ronaldo Lima (a.k.a. "Chorão") decided to form the band with the idea of mixing heavy metal with macumba's "pontos cantados". Thus, “Saravá Metal” was born. With their stripped-down, fast and aggressive style, the band played for two years in Rio's underground circuit, one highlight being the opening act for a Ratos de Porão gig at Circo Voador, who were then promoting the Brasil album.

== Artistry ==
=== Musical influences ===
Gangrena Gasosa, from the start, exhibited a wide variety of influences. Apart from homegrown acts Sepultura, Ratos de Porão and Mystifier, Arede ("Zé Pilintra") also points out that thrash (Slayer), crossover (S.O.D.), death metal, grindcore (namely Anal Cunt and Brutal Truth) and industrial metal (Ministry, Fear Factory, Nailbomb) were part of their listening habits.

On the Brazilian side, jazz multi-instrumentalist Hermeto Pascoal and controversial samba composer Bezerra da Silva.

=== Themes ===
The band frequently did humorous song titles. One such examples is "Exu Noise Terror" from their debut, Welcome to Terreiro. It's equally a reference to tricksterian Yoruba divinity Èṣù and British crust punk band Extreme Noise Terror. The song is an Umbadist "ponto cantado" sung and played in a variety of extreme metal styles, from ENT's characteristic shouted/growled two-vocalist delivery, to 1980s speed metal and 1990s black metal-like blast beats.

== Members ==
=== Current lineup ===
- Angelo Arede (Zé Pelintra) – vocal
- Eder Santana (Omulú) – vocal
- Minoru Murakami (Exu Caveira) – guitar
- Diego Padilha (Tranca Rua) – bass
- Gê Vasconcelos (Pomba Gira Maria Mulambo) – percussion
- Alex Porto (Exu Tiriri) – drums

=== Former members ===
- Ronaldo Lima (Chorão³) – vocal
- Tony Vomito – vocal
- Paulão – vocal
- Rocco – vocal
- Cristiano – vocal
- Denilson Pacheco – guitar
- Vladimir Rodriguez – guitar
- Alexandre Reder – guitar
- Sapato – bass
- Moreno – bass
- Felipe Coelho – bass
- Anjo Caldas – percussion
- Fábio Lessa – percussion
- Heitor Peralles – percussion
- Elijan "Mutley" Rodrigues – percussion, drums
- Renzo Borges – drums
- Thiago Rafael – drums
- Cid Mesquita – drums
- Adriano "Magrão" – drums

== Discography ==
=== Studio albums ===
- Welcome to Terreiro (1993)
- Smells Like a Tenda Spirita (2000)
- Se Deus É 10, Satanás É 666 (2011)
- Gente Ruim Só Manda Lembrança Pra Quem Não Presta (2018)
- Figa of the Dark (2024)

=== EPs ===
- 6/6/6 (2006)
- Kizila (2020)

=== DVDs ===
- Desagradável (2013)
