= Tuyo (Rodrigo Amarante song) =

2015 single by Rodrigo Amarante

Single by Rodrigo Amarante

from the album Narcos (A Netflix Original Series Soundtrack)
- Released: August 28, 2015
- Genre: Bolero; folk
- Length: 1:29
- Label: Lakeshore; Gaumont International Television; Idol
- Songwriter: Rodrigo Amarante
- Producer: Rodrigo Amarante

Rodrigo Amarante singles chronology
"I'm Ready" (2015)	"Tuyo" (2015)	"Nú Com a Minha Música" (2016)

Tuyo is a bolero written and composed by Brazilian singer-songwriter Rodrigo Amarante for Narcos' opening theme. Amarante wrote and vocalized the Spanish-language song, "Tuyo" ("Yours"), as the opening theme for the Netflix Original series Narcos. He was inspired by the thought of what kind of music Pablo Escobar's mother would have listened to when raising her son. The song debuted at No. 6 on the Latin Pop Digital Songs around the 2015 series premiere and was nominated for a Primetime Emmy Award for Outstanding Main Title Theme Music.

== Charts ==
Weekly chart performance for "Tuyo"
Chart (2015–2021)	Peak position
France (SNEP)	88
Hungary (Single Top 40)	13
US Hot Latin Songs (Billboard)	38
