= Alberto Fortis (musician) =

Italian musician and songwriter

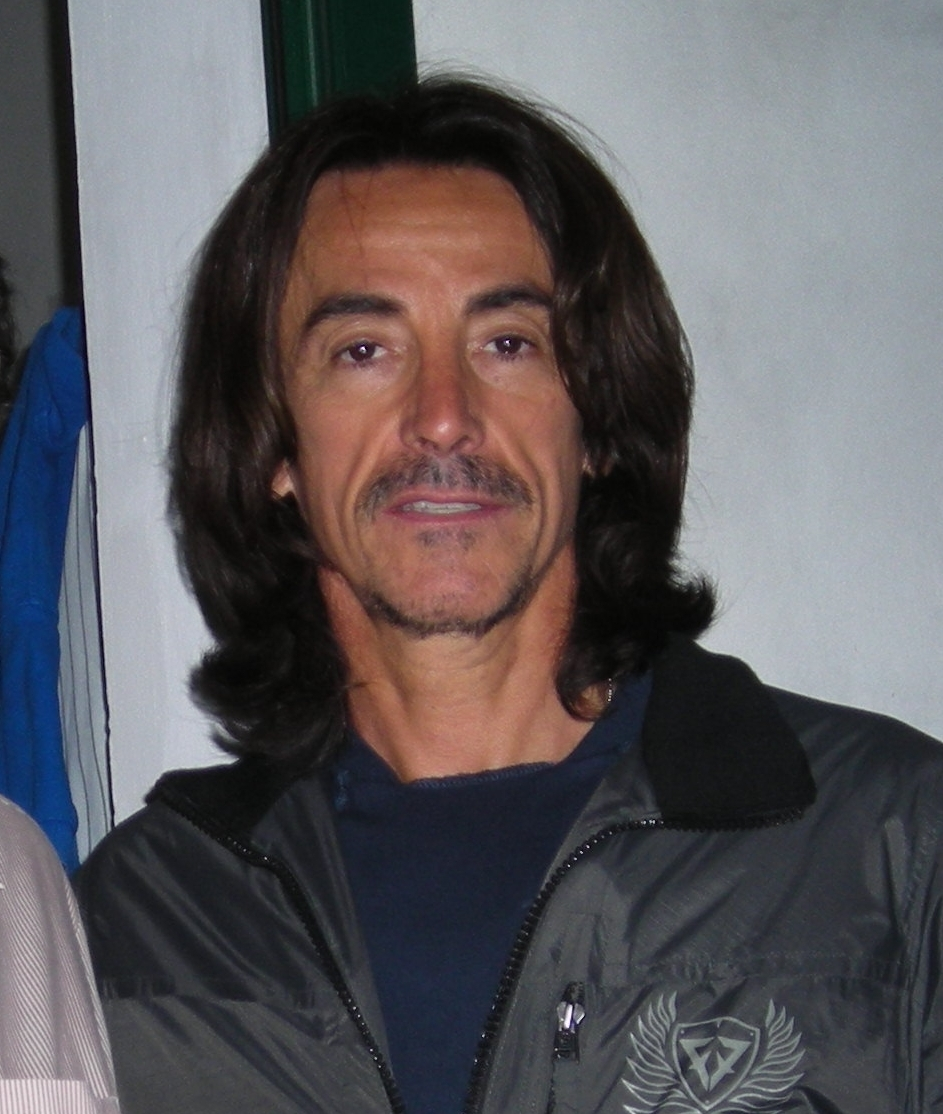
- Fortis in 2007

Background information
- Born: Alberto Fortis; June 3, 1955 (age 71); Piedmont, Italy
- Origin: Italy
- Occupations: musician, songwriter, poet
- Years active: 1978–1994, 2001–present

Alberto Fortis (born June 3, 1955 in Domodossola) is an Italian musician, songwriter, and poet.

Fortis released his first album, Alberto Fortis, in 1979. He is the composer of both music and lyrics and has directed the video clips for three of his songs. Alberto Fortis contains His famous song is "Milano e Vincenzo", also known in Italy as "Vincenzo, io t'ammazzerò" ("Vincent, I'm going to kill you"), taken from the first words of the song, where Fortis expresses his anger with Vincenzo Micocci, his first producer.

His discography includes official collections and live recordings, with a dozen albums made in Italy and abroad (Los Angeles, New York City and London). Three of his albums have gone gold.

In the late eighties and early nineties, Fortis wrote poetry, published in two books, Tributo giapponese (1988) and Dentro il giardino (1994), both of which were edited by Giovanni Tranchida.

Very popular in the eighties, Fortis's career has experienced a lull; however, he returned to prominence in 2006 with his participation in the third edition of the reality show Music Farm, hosted by Simona Ventura (a show similar to the Hit Me, Baby, One More Time format) on Rai Due.

== Discography ==
Discography:

- 1979 - Alberto Fortis (Album)
- 1980 - Tra demonio e santità
- 1981 - La grande grotta
- 1982 - Fragole infinite
- 1984 - El nino
- 1985 - West of Broadway
- 1987 - Assolutamente tuo
- 1990 - Carta del cielo
- 1991 - L'uovo (Live Album)
- 1991 - Fortissimo
- 1994 - Dentro al giardino
- 2001 - Angeldom
- 2003 - Universo Fortis
- 2005 - Fiori sullo schermo futuro
- 2014 - Do l'anima
- 2016 - Con Te EP ( Sony Music Italia )
