= Little Joy (album) =

Studio album by Little Joy
- Released: November 4, 2008
- Length: 30:48
- Label: Rough Trade
- Producer: Noah Georgeson; Thom Monahan

Singles from Little Joy
- 1. "No One's Better Sake" Released: December 10, 2008; 2. "The Next Time Around" Released: May 12, 2009

Professional ratings
Review scores
Source	Rating
AllMusic	4/5 stars
Billboard	3.5/5 stars
ChartAttack	3.5/5 stars
Los Angeles Times	2.5/5 stars
NME	(7/10)
Pitchfork	(7.2/10)
Rolling Stone	4/5 stars
Spin	3.5/5 stars
Tiny Mix Tapes	4/5 marks

Little Joy is the self-titled debut studio album by Brazilian/American rock band Little Joy. It was released on November 4, 2008.

== Track listing ==
No.	Title	Lyrics	Music	Length
1.	"The Next Time Around"	Rodrigo Amarante, Fabrizio Moretti	Moretti	2:35
2.	"Brand New Start"	Moretti	Moretti	3:05
3.	"Play the Part"	Amarante, Moretti, Shapiro	Amarante, Moretti, Binki Shapiro	2:57
4.	"No One's Better Sake"	Moretti	Moretti	2:51
5.	"Unattainable"	Moretti, Shapiro	Moretti, Shapiro	2:00
6.	"Shoulder to Shoulder"	Moretti	Amarante, Moretti	2:37
7.	"With Strangers"	Moretti	Amarante, Moretti	2:49
8.	"Keep Me in Mind"	Moretti	Amarante	2:22
9.	"How to Hang a Warhol"	Amarante, Moretti, Shapiro	Amarante	2:07
10.	"Don't Watch Me Dancing"	Moretti, Shapiro	Amarante, Moretti	3:33
11.	"Evaporar"	Amarante	Amarante	3:52
Total length:				30:48

== Personnel ==
- Fabrizio Moretti – guitar, tenor guitar, piano, bass guitar, drums, percussion, melodica, backing vocals
- Binki Shapiro – vocals, guitar, glockenspiel, percussion, backing vocals
- Rodrigo Amarante – vocals, guitar, piano, bass, ukulele, organ, Mellotron, percussion, backing vocals

Additional Personnel

- Andrew Balogh – baritone saxophone
- Samuel Pannell – tenor horn
- Ryan Duffy – violin
- Alison Lowell – oboe
- Maciej Sflif – bassoon
- Brendan Speltz – violin
- David Tuohy – backing vocals on "With Strangers"
- Keegan Wood – trombone
- Wen Yee – viola
- Amy Tatum – flute
- Loribeth Capella – backing vocals on "With Strangers"
- Mia Barcia-Colombo – cello
- Adam Green – backing vocals on "With Strangers"
- Andy Leonard – clarinet
- Nick Valensi – backing vocals on "With Strangers"
- Noah Georgeson – guitar, slide guitar, backing vocals on "Brand New Start", "No One's Better Sake", and "Keep Me in Mind"; mixing, production
- Mia Barcia Colombo – cello
- Mike Davis – trumpet, contractor
- Carlos Zetino – backing vocals, ambience
- Devendra Banhart – additional vocals on "Don't Watch Me Dancing"
