= Cara Estranho =

Single by Los Hermanos

from the album Ventura
- Released: April 16, 2003
- Recorded: 2003
- Genre: Alternative rock, indie rock
- Length: 3:26
- Label: Sony BMG
- Songwriter(s): Marcelo Camelo
- Producer(s): Alexandre Kassin

Los Hermanos singles chronology
"Fingi na Hora Rir" (2002)	"Cara Estranho" (2003)	"O Vencedor" (2003)

"Cara Estranho" is the first single extracted from Ventura album, the band Los Hermanos, the name of the band is Portuguese for "Strange Man". The band, consisting of Marcelo Camelo, as well as other album repertoire, presented in pre-production, a dissenting letter of its final version. Its structure is home to no chorus, turning the verses that begin with "Look" / "Look over there" in striking parts of the song, since there are no elements that are repeated in music. In addition, the verses "It's part of the game / tell the world all / only know their bad lot" and "It's simple like that / when it shrinks the chest / and pretend there is no competition" are also quite sung in their submissions to alive. The track was very well executed on radio across the country, even to their characteristics of not having a specific chorus.

== Video clip ==
The 'Strange Man' video is the audiovisual material that more indications yielded the band in musical awards. Only in the edition 2003 of the BMV, MTV Brasil, the video was nominated for five categories: art direction, direction, video of the year, audience and rock music video. However, the band was not awarded any prize, being hit by Videos "Qual é" and "Só por uma noite", respectively, the rapper Marcelo D2 and the band Charlie Brown Jr. The video consists of a narrative that speaks to the lyrics. In it, a character which has the lower part of his body similar with those found in fish, wakes up in a bed and desperately tries to cram in a place with water. Sometimes, making this one saga background, touching the band appears having sometimes images of each Big-close members. When the character finally finds a suitable place for their survival, it can be noted in the video one sentence (non-credited) from the Brazilian poet Manoel de Barros, which "Fish do not have horizons".
