= Nina Becker =

Brazilian singer-songwriter (born 1974)

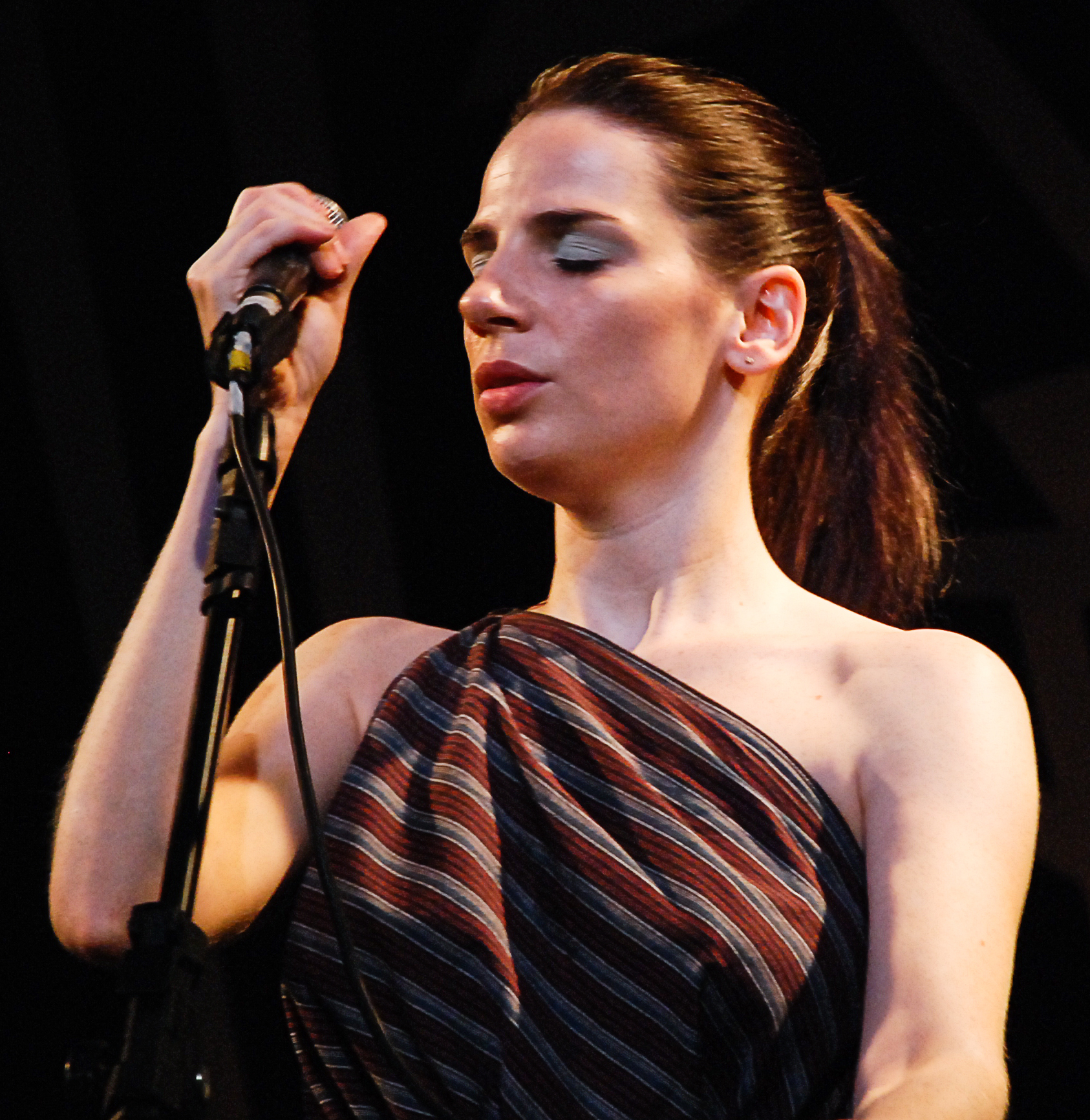
- Becker performing with Orquestra Imperial (Mexico City, 2008)
- Born: Nina Becker Nunes; 21 July 1974 (age 51); Rio de Janeiro, Brazil
- Occupation: singer
- Years active: 2002–present
- Musical career
- Genres: MPB

Nina Becker Nunes (born 21 July 1974) is a Brazilian singer-songwriter.

== Life and career ==
Born in Rio de Janeiro, Becker is the stepdaughter of conductor Roberto Gnattali and the niece of composer Radamés Gnattali. She studied graphic design, and before starting her musical career she worked as set designer and art director.

In 2002, Becker began performing as a singer with Orquestra Imperial, and in 2004 she started a parallel solo live career, also taking part to other musical projects, notably 3NaMassa. In 2009, she received the APCA Award for best singer. She made her record debut in 2010, with the albums Azul and Vermelho.

Becker is married to Marcelo Callado, the bassist of the band Do Amor, with whom in 2012 she released the collaboration album Gambito Budapeste. She is also a stylist.

== Discography ==
Albums

- Azul (2010)
- Vermelho (2010)
- Gambito Budapeste (2012, with Marcelo Callado)
- Minha Dolores - Nina Becker Canta Dolores Duran (2014)
- Acrílico (2017)
