= Ponto cantado =

Ponto cantado is a sacred chant that is seen in Afro-Brazilian religions like Umbanda and Candomble. These ritual songs are used during religious ceremonies to invoke spiritual entities and mark the stages of worship.

== Origins and historical development ==
The musical and religious tradition were brought to Brazil by enslaved Africans, and pontos cantados developed from those traditions. The traditions were mainly influenced from Catholicism, specifically Indigenous Brazilian and Roman Catholics. Specific chants developed over time and are associated with specific deities and spirits within each religion.

== Ritual function ==
Pontos Cantados serves multiple ceremonial functions, listed below.

1. Invoke specific spirits
2. Open/close ritual sessions
3. Protect/cleanse ritual spaces
4. Structures the ceremony

== Musical characteristics ==
Just like a chant, Pontos Cantados are usually short and repetitive. Pontos Cantados also includes call and response singing. An atabaque drum is also commonly used to accompany the singing, so it creates a nice rhythm. Repetition establishes a focused atmosphere for the audience.

== Cultural influence ==
Outside of religious settings, Pontos Cantados influence Brazilian popular music. The artist Clara Nunes is the best representative of it. She incorporated Afro Brazilian religious themes and musical elements into her recordings. Some themes include references to umbanda or candomble rituals and specific imagery relating to nature, ancestors, and sacred forces.
