= Kaleidoscópio =

Brazilian musical duo

Kaleidoscópio (also known as Kaleido) is a Brazilian drum and bass and bossa nova duo from São Paulo, Brazil, consisting of DJ Ramilson Maia and singer and dancer Janaina Lima, who started playing together in 2002. Their producer was Gui (Jorge) Boratto. They become popular in Brazil and Italy after the release of their single "Você me apareceu" in 2003.

In 2004, their first album, Tem que valer, was released in Brazil by Mega Music and subsequently in Europe (UK and Italy) and the USA by IRMA Group Records.

The Kaleidoscópio participated in Festivalbar 2004. In 2006, they released their second album (only in Japan), entitled Kaleido (label: Aperitivo Records). In 2007, a new album followed, New Sessions! (IRMA records). For a short period of time they called their band Kaleido, but later reverted to the original name.

In the beginning of 2010, Janaina Lima, the lead singer and dancer, presented her debut solo album, Me Leva com voce. More recently, she announced on her YouTube channel her imminent return to the band.

In December 2016, they released their fourth album, Amava Você (label: iMusics).
