= Little Joy =

Rock band

- Origin: Los Angeles, California, United States
- Genres: Alternative rock, indie rock, indie pop, soft rock, samba, MPB, bossa nova
- Years active: 2006–2010 (on hiatus)
- Label: Rough Trade Records
- Members: Rodrigo Amarante; Fabrizio Moretti; Binki Shapiro
- Website: www.myspace.com/littlejoymusic

Little Joy is a rock supergroup formed in 2007 by Los Hermanos singer-songwriter Rodrigo Amarante, The Strokes drummer Fabrizio Moretti, and Binki Shapiro. They released Little Joy, their only album, in 2008.

== History ==
=== Formation and beginnings (2006–2008) ===
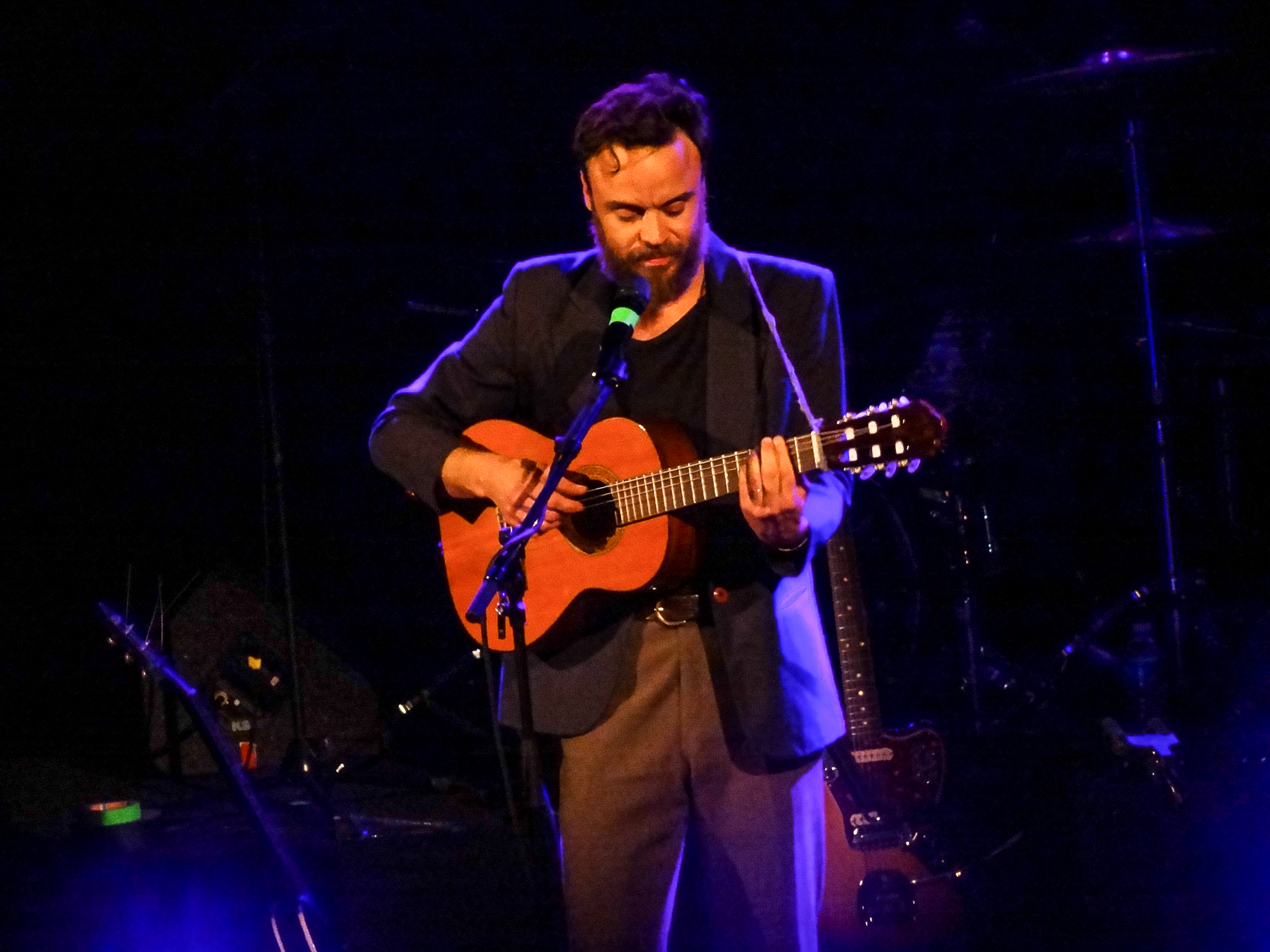
Rodrigo Amarante of Little Joy

Amarante and Moretti met in 2006, at a festival in Lisbon where both their bands were performing, and the idea came up to start a new musical project unrelated to their respective bands. In 2007, with Los Hermanos on hiatus "for an undetermined amount of time", Amarante traveled to Los Angeles to collaborate with Devendra Banhart on his Smokey Rolls Down Thunder Canyon album. He and Moretti met during recording breaks and talked about "anything but music." Through mutual acquaintances, they met multi-instrumentalist Jordana Shapiro, who goes by "Binki," and she encouraged the pair to work on a few songs Moretti had begun writing. The band then moved into a house in the Echo Park area of Los Angeles to write more original music and record some demos. The band was christened "Little Joy" after a cocktail lounge not far from their house.

=== Little Joy (2008–2010) ===
Their eponymous debut album was recorded with the help of producer Noah Georgeson and engineer Beau Raymond, whom Amarante met during his sessions with Devendra Banhart. It was released by Rough Trade Records on November 4, 2008, and was hailed by Pitchfork Media as "one of the sweetest, most listenable, consistently enjoyable records of the season." Their debut album was given four stars by Rolling Stone magazine and Nick Hornby voted it his favorite album of 2008.

== In popular culture ==
Binki Shapiro contributed, alongside Little Joy collaborator Devendra Banhart, to Beck's second Record Club covers album, Songs of Leonard Cohen, as well as previously appearing in many of the music videos released from his album The Information, released in October 2006.

"The Next Time Around" was used in a television commercial for the Volkswagen Passat.

== Band members ==
=== Little Joy ===
- Rodrigo Amarante – vocals, guitar, bass, piano, ukulele, organ, Mellotron, percussion (2007–present)
- Binki Shapiro – guitar, vocals, bass, keyboards, glockenspiel, percussion (2007–present)
- Fabrizio Moretti – tenor guitar, piano, bass, drums, guitar, percussion, melodica, vocals (2007–present)

=== Live band ===
Little Joy

- Rodrigo Amarante – vocals, guitar, percussion (2007–2010)
- Binki Shapiro – guitar, vocals, keyboards, percussion (2007–2010)
- Fabrizio Moretti – tenor guitar, guitar, percussion, vocals, drums (2007–2009)
- Jack Dishel – tenor guitar, guitar, percussion, vocals (2009–2010)

Backing band

- Todd Dahlhoff – bass, vocals (2008–2010)
- Matt Romano – drums, percussion (2008–2010)
- Matt Borg – guitar, vocals (2008–2010)
- Michael Ian Cummings – guitar, vocals (2008–2010)
- Noah Georgeson – guitar, vocals (2008–2010)

== Discography ==
- Little Joy (2008)
