= Anna Rothschild =

Science journalist

Anna Rothschild is a science journalist. She was awarded the 2016 AAAS Kavli Gold Award for Children's Science News and received the American Institute of Physics' 2012 Science Communication Award for New Media, and their 2015 award for Broadcast/New Media.

== Life ==
Anna Rothschild is of Jewish descent.

She graduated from Brown University, and New York University. She was a journalist for The Washington Post. She was a senior producer for FiveThirtyEight.

She hosted Anna’s Science Magic Show Hooray, a video series from The Washington Post. She created Gross Science, a YouTube series from NOVA and PBS Digital Studios.
