= Bloco do Eu Sozinho =

Studio album by Los Hermanos
- Released: 23 July 2001
- Genres: Indie rock; MPB
- Length: 49:23
- Label: Abril Music
- Producer: Chico Neves

Los Hermanos chronology
Los Hermanos (1999)	Bloco do Eu Sozinho (2001)	Ventura (2003)

Professional ratings
Review scores
Source	Rating
Omelete	5/5 stars
The Music Box	4/5 stars

Bloco do Eu Sozinho is the second album from Brazilian band Los Hermanos, released in 2001.

Following the success of "Anna Júlia", during production of their second album, the band was pressured by their label, Abril Music, to release another hit. Their debut album Los Hermanos sold over 350,000 units. To alleviate tension, the band elected to produce the album in the mountains of Rio De Janeiro, where they could work without distraction. During production, bassist Patrick Laplan chose to leave the group to focus on his project as he was, allegedly, dissatisfied with the band's evolving sound. The band's producer and collaborator, Alexandre Kassin, stepped in to replace him during the album's recording. When the album was completed and presented to Abril Music, the label rejected it due to a perceived lack of potential hits and amateurish production. The label insisted on the album being remastered. In a compromise, producer Marcelo Sussekind agreed to remix the album. Sussekind favoured the original version and thus produced a version almost identical to the original, which was then submitted to the record company.

Sales for Bloco do Eu Sozinho did not meet the label's expectations, selling fewer units than their previous release. The album was however nominated at the 2002 Latin Grammy Awards for "Best Brazilian Rock Album." The band would see success from their following album, Ventura. Los Hermanos also began touring regularly, often doing several shows a year.

In 2007, Bloco do Eu Sozinho was named the 42nd "best brazilian album of all time" by Rolling Stone Brasil magazine.

== Track listing ==
No.	Title	Length
1.	"Todo Carnaval Tem Seu Fim" (Marcelo Camelo)	4:23
2.	"A Flor" (Rodrigo Amarante, Marcelo Camelo)	3:27
3.	"Retrato Pra Iaiá" (Rodrigo Amarante, Marcelo Camelo)	3:57
4.	"Assim Será" (Marcelo Camelo)	3:36
5.	"Casa Pré-Fabricada" (Marcelo Camelo)	2:55
6.	"Cadê Teu Suín-?" (Marcelo Camelo)	2:35
7.	"Sentimental" (Rodrigo Amarante)	5:09
8.	"Cher Antoine" (Rodrigo Amarante)	2:29
9.	"Deixa Estar" (Marcelo Camelo)	3:30
10.	"Mais Uma Canção" (Marcelo Camelo, Rodrigo Amarante)	4:11
11.	"Fingi Na Hora Rir" (Marcelo Camelo)	4:10
12.	"Veja Bem Meu Bem" (Marcelo Camelo)	4:40
13.	"Tão Sozinho" (Marcelo Camelo)	1:19
14.	"Adeus Você" (Marcelo Camelo)	2:58
Total length:		49:23

== Personnel ==
- Marcelo Camelo – vocals, guitar
- Rodrigo Amarante – vocals, guitar
- Rodrigo Barba – drums
- Bruno Medina – keyboard
- Rafael Ramos – producer

== Additional musicians ==
- Alexandre Kassin – bass
- Felipe Abrahão – vocals on "Cher Antoine" and "Mais uma Canção"
- Lenna Beauty – Spanish vocals on "Sentimental"
- Rapudo – bass
- Andréa Ernest Dias – flute
- Daniel Garcia – tenor saxophone
- Eduardo Morelenbaum – clarinet, clarone
- Bidinho – trumpet
- Bubu – trumpet, flugelhorn
- Vitor sSantos – trombone
- Eliézer Rodrigues – tuba
- Janaina Botelho Perotto – oboe
- Bernardo Bessler – violin
- Michael Bessler – violin
- Marie Christinie Springel – viola
- Jaques Morelenbaum – violoncello
