= Los Hermanos =

Brazilian rock band

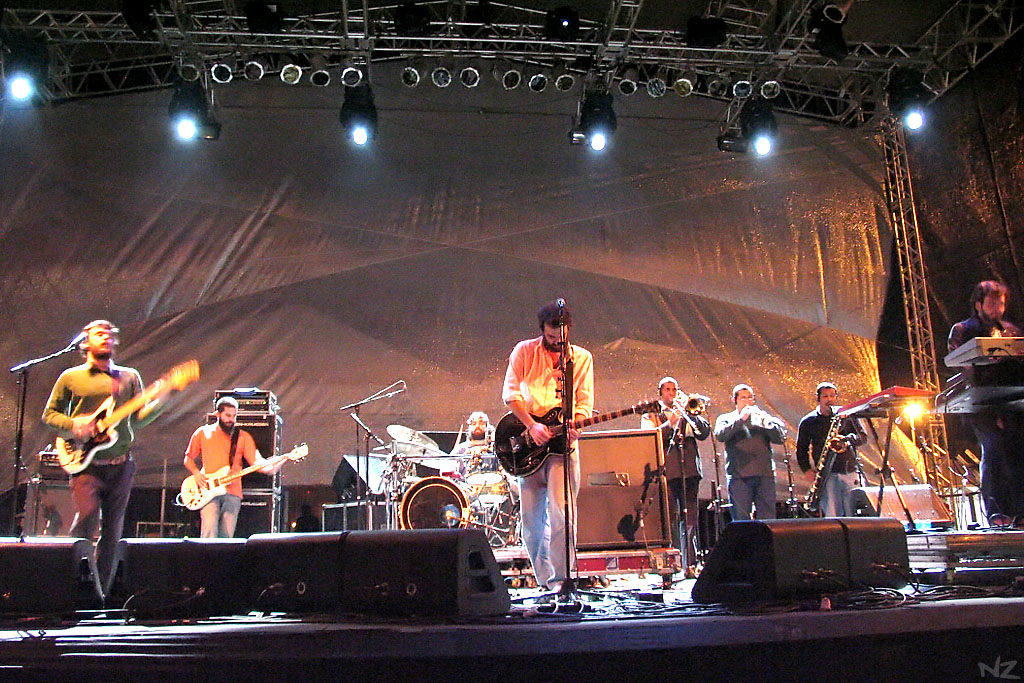
- Los Hermanos in Belo Horizonte, MG, in 2005.

Background information
- Origin: Rio de Janeiro, RJ, Brazil
- Genres: Alternative rock, indie rock, MPB, skacore (early), melodic hardcore (early)
- Years active: 1997–2007 (on hiatus) (reunions: 2009, 2010, 2012, 2015, 2019)
- Label: Sony BMG
- Members: Marcelo Camelo; Rodrigo Amarante; Rodrigo Barba; Bruno Medina
- Past members: Patrick Laplan
- Website: www.loshermanos.com.br

Los Hermanos is a rock band from Rio de Janeiro, Brazil. The group was formed in 1997 by Marcelo Camelo (vocals/guitar/bass guitar), Rodrigo Amarante (guitar/bass guitar/vocals), Rodrigo Barba (drums), and Bruno Medina (keyboards/keyboard bass). Currently they are on an extended hiatus, performing some concerts sporadically.

Although the band is Brazilian, the name is in Spanish, meaning "the brothers", which would be "Os Irmãos" in Portuguese.

== History ==
=== Formation and first years (1997–99) ===
Then students from Pontifical Catholic University of Rio de Janeiro, Marcelo Camelo (journalism), and Rodrigo Barba (psychology) formed a band that mixed hardcore influences with the lightness of lyrics about love. In addition, the band had a saxophonist, and, later, the keyboardist Bruno Medina, an advertising student at the same college, was incorporated to the group. When the musicians Rodrigo Amarante (vocals, guitar and percussion) and Patrick Laplan (bass) joined the band, and with the output of three musicians of their formation (trumpeter Marcio and saxophonists Carlos and Victor), they recorded in 1997 their first material, the demos "Chora" and "Amor e Folia."

The demos affected the underground scene of Rio de Janeiro and later the Los Hermanos were called to play at the "Superdemos", a great independent music festival from Rio, and festival Abril Pro Rock, in Recife, Pernambuco.

=== Los Hermanos and the single "Anna Julia" (1999–2001) ===
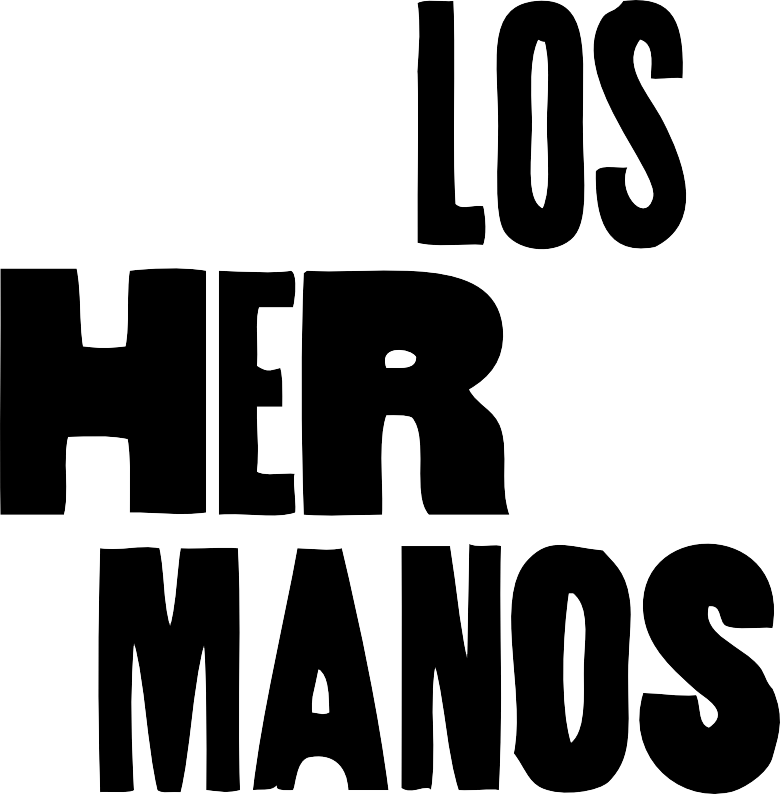
Logo used by Los Hermanos.

The two demos eventually found their way to the hands of Paulo André, the producer of the Abril Pro Rock festival, in Recife. The band was then invited to perform on one of the biggest alternative music festivals in Brazil, the Superdemo. Their first album self-titled album, released in 1999, became a huge seller on the back of the hit single "Anna Júlia". The album's success was driven by the song "Anna Julia" chosen - for the record - as the first single, for it was a number that resonated among young people, identified with the Jovem Guarda style lyrics, mixed to a musical group influenced by rock, ska and samba. The album was produced by famed producer Rick Bonadio, known for his work with bands that were selling-phenomena. According to Bonadio, he had been responsible for convincing the band to put the song in the final selection of the repertoire CD. The single was inspired by a band producer's affair, and brought the band not only to radio stations across the country, but also to various events, such as agricultural fairs and soccer games stadiums and micaretas, and to play for more than 80,000 people in some of the country festivals, even with only one record released. The band was a regular on popular television shows. In just one semester, "Anna Julia" was already included in the top positions of the leading radio stations in the country. Its music video, which featured the actress Mariana Ximenes, was constantly displayed on programs dedicated to both gender in channels such as MTV. In just one year, "Los Hermanos" sold 300,000 copies emplacado and two singles in the hit parade, as the aforementioned "Anna Julia" and the second single, "Primavera". The album also spawned a Grammy nomination in 2000. In the Multishow award, in 2000, the band won the "Best Song" award with "Anna Julia", beating competitors such as Chico Buarque. Camelo said, "Man, I do not even know what to say, I feel embarrassed to win a prize in a category where Chico Buarque is competing.". The runaway success of "Anna Júlia", in some sense, overshadowed the rest of their career, leading some to think they are a one-hit wonder, despite experiencing success among fans and critics with other releases. The song has been covered by many different artists, including Jim Capaldi with the guitar solo being played by George Harrison, in his last recorded work.

=== Bloco do Eu Sozinho (2001–03) ===
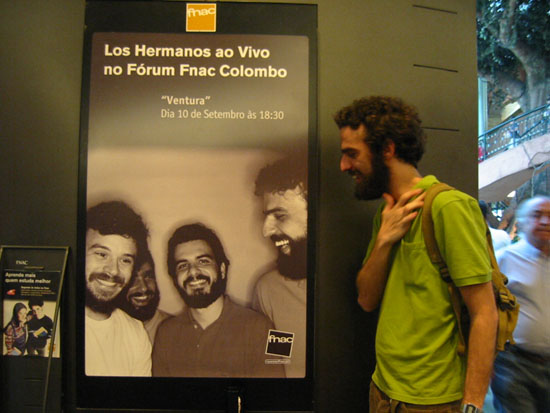
Marcelo Camelo at Fnac in 2003.

After the success of their first album, the band released Bloco do Eu Sozinho in 2001, leaving behind the hardcore sound that characterized their debut, instead favouring a mix of rock, samba, and other Brazilian rhythms. Some of the songs on this album were played at Rock in Rio III. The band lost bassist Patrick Laplan, who cited musical differences and started his own band, Eskimo. "Bloco..." surprised much of the public by being an album with (almost) no resemblance to its predecessor. The euphoria of the first CD was not repeated in sales, and the band went on to play in smaller venues, with the decrease of their audience. But from that point, the band gained a major ally in their walk: the public, which showed itself always more faithful. Songs like "Todo Carnaval tem seu Fim" (first single), "A Flor" and "Sentimental", became minor hits, despite not much airplay. After the release of the album, the critics begin to praise it. It later gained some more notoriety, in the wake of big divergences between the band and their label. The guitarist Rodrigo Amarante, now had more space in the band, with compositions like "Retrato Pra Iaiá", "Sentimental", "Cher Antoine" and "A Flor" (this one with Marcelo Camelo). Their road back to a bigger audience was followed by their participation in "Fordsupermodels" (the band played on a stage, doing the soundtrack for the fashion show) and Luau MTV, a MTV show on which were included, in acoustic versions, songs from the first and second CDs, to later be released on DVD. Bloco do Eu Sozinho, in spite of being considered (nowadays) as one of the best Brazilian rock albums of all time, did not have much impact in the media, mainly due to the conflicts with the label Abril Music.

=== Ventura (2003–05) ===
The follow-up to Bloco do Eu Sozinho, Ventura, was released in 2003, and the band's sound was even more influenced by samba, choro and bossa nova. Although these albums weren't as commercially successful as Los Hermanos, they were acclaimed by critics and generated a strong cult following which propelled the band to be regarded as one of the defining alternative rock acts in Brazil, mainly because of their elaborate lyrics and their mixture of Brazilian rhythms with rock.

The year 2003 arrived and already in BMG (now Sony Music), the Hermanos released the album "Ventura". Called "Bonança" at first, it was the first Brazilian disc to virtually "leak" in its pre-production phase. The third album featured a multi-faceted Los Hermanos. Of "Samba a Dois" to the pop rock of "O Vencedor", or with the dialogues of "Conversa de Botas Batidas" and "Do Lado de Dentro", "Ventura" was the album that consolidated the band on the national scene. The first single, "Cara Estranho", had good presence on the radio and was nominated to some music video awards. Then came "O Vencedor" and "Último Romance", the latter composed by Rodrigo Amarante, who wrote five of the 15 songs on the CD and started to stand out as a songwriter. The singer Maria Rita, in her eponymous album, recorded three songs of Marcelo Camelo: "Santa Chuva", "Cara Valente" and "Veja Bem, Meu Bem". The shows began to house a legion of fans who had become the trademark of the band. It was on the tour of "Ventura" that it was shot the concert that became the DVD "Live at Cine Íris". Recorded in Rio de Janeiro, it contained predominantly their latest CD's repertoire. The band also recorded the soundtrack for the short film "Castanho", by Eduardo Valente, where the disco style was very evident in the early version of "Talk ..." and the song known only as "Tema do Macaco".

In the presentation of the band in the VMB 2003, they were presented by singer and composer Caetano Veloso. In announcing the band, Veloso put a fake red beard, like all members of the front rows of the awards. The action was classified as "embarrassing" by keyboardist Bruno Medina.

In January 2004, the band performed in Domingão do Faustão, a famous TV show in Brazil. During the show, the band played the song "Anna Julia", due to the insistence of the presenter Fausto Silva, who said that the band "never played" the song. The band received an e-mail from a fan, questioning and criticizing the presenter. This criticism was refuted by keyboardist Bruno Medina, at the very site of banda.

In July 2004, the singer Marcelo Camelo was assaulted by Chorão, vocalist of the band Charlie Brown Jr. The attack occurred in the arrivals hall of Fortaleza airport and the aggressor came to be arrested by Federal Police. Even after a note apologizing for the event, Chorão was sued by Camelo and had to compensate the singer for moral damages and reimbursement of canceled commitments. The attack occurred because of statements from Marcelo Camelo and Rodrigo Amarante, in the OI magazine, on the then recent advertising campaign for Coca-Cola soft drink brand. On the occasion, Charlie Brown Jr. was contracted and, in the video, questioned a boy who did not agree with the items offered in commercial.

In 2008, both Bloco do Eu Sozinho and Ventura figured in Rolling Stone magazine's list The Top 100 Brazilian Albums of All Time, placing 42nd and 68th, respectively.

=== 4 (2005–07) ===
In 2005 came the fourth CD of the band, "4". Produced by Alexandre Kassin, who had also produced the last two albums, it showed a more introspective content and a more impactful approach to MPB. The record, however, would be considered "irregular" by the critics. Whether it was the acoustic guitar in "Sapato Novo" and bossa "Fez-se Mar" or the predominance of a nostalgic mood in the lyrics of Camelo and Amarante, "4" again divided the public: the band was in another new direction. The album had a successful single, "O Vento", by guitarist Rodrigo Amarante. It was followed by "Condicional" and "Morena" (the videos for both songs were shot at the same time, with the band playing live, in a room).

In 2006 the band toured Portugal with The Strokes for the second time and Spain with Portuguese band Toranja.

=== Recess and hiatus (2007–) ===
On April 23, 2007, after ten years of uninterrupted career work, the band announced a recess for an undetermined time span (hiatus). The note on the official website affirmed that there were no quarrels whatsoever among the band members, the reason for the recess simply being each one's need of time to dedicate to other personal activities. On the same note the band also announced its three final performances on June 7, 8 and 9th, in Rio de Janeiro. The two vocalists of the band released, in 2008, their first personal projects, during the hiatus of the band. Camelo released his brand new album, called Sou, and later another one, called "Toque Dela" (2011), while Amarante joined Fabrizio Moretti, drummer of The Strokes, and Binki Shapiro to form the band Little Joy. He also played with the supergroup Orquestra Imperial. In 2013, he released his first solo work, Cavalo (album). Rodrigo Barba went to play drums in the bands Jason and Canastra.

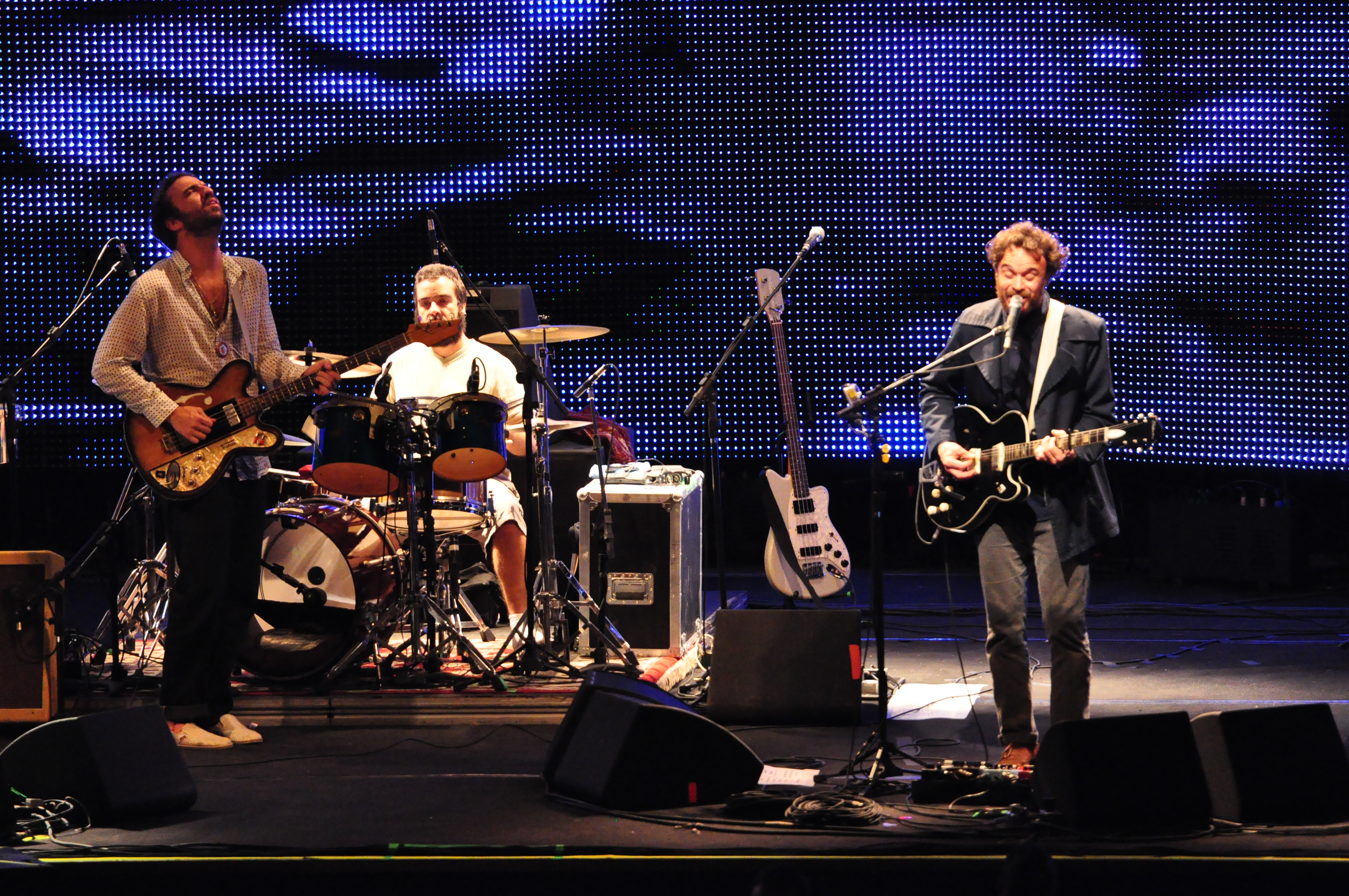
Los Hermanos performing in 2012

In 2009, Los Hermanos played at "Just a Fest" festival at São Paulo and Rio de Janeiro, along with Kraftwerk and Radiohead. But, according to Bruno Medina, these two concerts didn't mean the band would record an album soon.

In 2010 they played in the SWU Music & Arts Festival and four additional gigs, but without hints of a future reunion or a new album.

To celebrate the 15th anniversary of the band, in 2012 they toured thirteen cities around Brazil.

In December 2014, it was announced that the band would be headlining three concerts at Marina da Glória during the official celebrations of the 450th anniversary of the band's hometown, Rio de Janeiro, in 2015. After the announcement of these concerts, more than 27.000 fans asked via the crowdfunding website Queremos! for a tour around other cities in Brazil, that was soon announced, including eight more cities. A fourth date at Marina da Glória was announced due to high tickets demand.

In 2015, Marcelo Camelo and his wife, the singer/songwriter Mallu Magalhães, had their first child. They live now in Portugal.

In 2019, the band reassembled to perform live concerts in nine different brazilian cities and one concert at the 2019 Loolapalooza Argentina festival. To commemorate the occasion, the band released the first new single in 14 years, "Corre, Corre".

== Band members ==
=== Current members ===
- Marcelo Camelo – guitar, lead vocals, bass (1997–present)
- Rodrigo Amarante – guitar, lead vocals, bass (1997–present)
- Bruno Medina – keyboards, backing vocals (1997–present)
- Rodrigo Barba – drums (1997–present)

=== Touring members ===
- Gabriel Bubu – bass, guitar, vocals (2001–present)
- Marcelo Costa – saxophone, clarinet (2001–present)
- Valtecir Bubu – trumpet (1999–present)
- Mauro Zacharias – trombone

=== Former members ===
- Patrick Laplan – bass (1997 - 2001)

== Discography ==
=== Studio albums ===
| Year | Album | Label |
|---|---|---|
| 1999 | Los Hermanos | Abril Music |
| 2001 | Bloco do Eu Sozinho | Abril Music |
| 2003 | Ventura | BMG |
| 2005 | 4 | Sony BMG |

=== Singles ===
| Year | Single | Album |
|---|---|---|
| 1999 | "Anna Júlia" | Los Hermanos |
