= Susan Cohn Rockefeller =

Entrepreneur, conservationist, and filmmaker

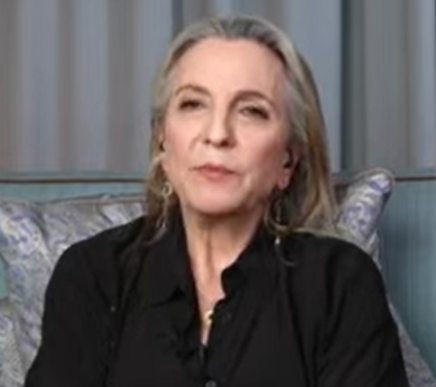
- Rockefeller c. 2022
- Born: Susan Cohn; January 14, 1959 (age 67); New York City, U.S.
- Education: Hampshire College; New York University
- Occupations: Entrepreneur, conversationist, filmmaker
- Spouses: Robert Erving Schulz, Jr. (m. 1995; div. 2006) David Rockefeller Jr. (m. 2008)
- Children: 2
- Family: Rockefeller family (by marriage)

Susan Cohn Rockefeller (formerly Schulz; born January 14, 1959) is an entrepreneur, conservationist, and filmmaker. She is the Founder and Editor-in-Chief of Musings. She also designs jewelry with themes that fit in with her work. She is a member of the Rockefeller family by her second marriage to David Rockefeller, Jr.

== Early life and education ==
Susan Cohn Rockefeller was born Susan Cohn on January 14, 1959, in New York City, to Bertram J. Cohn, a managing director of First Manhattan Company and governing council of the Wilderness Society in Washington, D.C., and Barbara B. Cohn, a former trustee at Sarah Lawrence College.

She received her undergraduate degree from Hampshire College and her master's degree from New York University.

== Career ==
Rockefeller's films have explored a range of contemporary issues such as ocean acidification and the future of ocean health, PTSD and the use of music to heal, the confluence of race, poverty and illness; and global food sustainability. Her films have aired on HBO, PBS, and the Discovery Channel. Her 2009 film, Sea Change, received the NOAA 2010 Environmental Hero Award.

Susan sits on the boards of Oceana, Stone Barns Center for Food and Agriculture, We Are Family Foundation, and is a member of the Natural Resources Defense Council Global Leadership Council. She also done fundraising work for the South Fork Natural History Museum.

In 2018, Rockefeller was noted in the book, Rescuing Ladybugs by author Jennifer Skiff as “inspiring awareness” and “mobilizing action across a range of environmental and philanthropic causes as a conservationist and ocean advocate. In the book, Rockefeller credits a “moment of enlightenment inspired by the pteropod” to her passion in “helping others understand the fragility of our ecosystem.”

In December 2021, Rockefeller and her husband each contributed $5,000 to The Next 50, a liberal political action committee (PAC).

== Personal life ==
Rockefeller was married to Robert Erving Schulz, Jr. from 1995 to about 2006. From his marriage she has two children; Annabel Schulz (b.c. 1997) and Henry Schulz. Today she resides in New York City with her husband, David Rockefeller Jr. She met David while filming in Alaska in 2006 and they were married in 2008.

== Filmography ==
- The Baby Shower (1998)
- Green Fire: Lives of Commitment and Passion in a Fragile World (1998)
- Running Madness (2002)
- Richard Nelson's Alaska (2006)
- A Sea Change (2009)
- Striking a Chord (2010)
- Making Crooked Straight (2010)
- Mission of Mermaids (2012)
- Food For Thought, Food For Life (2015)
