= Daniele Groff =

Italian singer and songwriter

- Born: June 7, 1973 (age 52); Trento, Italy
- Occupation: Singer-songwriter

Daniele Groff (born June 7, 1973) is an Italian singer and songwriter. In his songs, there are musical influences typical of Britpop bands, particularly Oasis, whom he has stated were his major inspirations from a young age.

== Biography ==
=== Early life and debut ===
Daniele Groff attended a specialized music high school in his hometown and graduated with a diploma in piano from the State Conservatory of Music. He later furthered his studies in the oboe and cello, earning intermediate diplomas in both instruments. His passion for Britpop inspired him at the age of nineteen to travel across the United Kingdom on his motorcycle. The event that sparked this journey across Europe was his desire to visit his ex-girlfriend in Paris, despite not knowing her address. Unable to find her, Groff decided to continue his trip and eventually reached London.

=== Fourth album ===
In 2007, Groff released the single Prendimi, co-written with Volker Hinkel, as a preview of a forthcoming fourth album. In the summer of that year, he opened Renato Zero's concerts with an acoustic set. In 2010, Groff performed at the Summer Music Festival.

In August 2012, he launched a crowdfunding project on the French platform Ulule to raise funds for his new album. The initiative was successful, raising €11,690, surpassing the initial goal of €10,000.

In 2015, Groff released the single Bellissima la verità and in June 2016, the single Sempre nella mia testa.

In 2023, Groff collaborated with the Southern Waves, lending his voice to the single Lullaby of Mine.

== Discography ==
Studio albums

- 1998 – Variatio 22
- 2001 – Bit
- 2004 – Mi accordo

Singles

- 1998 – Daisy
- 1998 – Io sono io
- 1999 – Adesso
- 1999 – Lamerica
- 1999 – Everyday
- 2000 – If You Don't Like It
- 2001 – Anna Julia
- 2001 – Lory (Chiudi gli occhi)
- 2004 – Sei un miracolo
- 2004 – Come sempre
- 2004 – Morning
- 2007 – Prendimi
- 2015 – Bellissima la verità
- 2016 – Sempre nella mia testa
- 2023 – Lullaby of Mine (with Southern Waves)
