= The +2's =

Brazilian band

The +2s is a Brazilian band from Rio de Janeiro that composes samba while also incorporating the sounds of funk and psychedelia into its music. The music group consists of Moreno Veloso, Domenico Lancelotti, and Alexandre Kassin (who also recorded the music to the anime Michiko & Hatchin). Each of them released a single album under his name with the suffix "+2", meaning "and two others".

+2 is signed to the record label Luaka Bop. This world music label has released three +2 albums: Music Typewriter, Sincerely Hot, and Futurismo.

== History ==
=== Moreno +2 ===
In 2000, the first CD released was Máquina de Escrever Música ("Music Writing Machine"), with Moreno Veloso leading the project, which focused dramatically on Moreno's voice and guitar. The album was released by the labels "ROCKiT!" and "Luaka Bop", owned by David Byrne. Several of the musical resources presented are unusual, such as tubes or handheld video games. Compositions by Moreno and some cover versions such as Eu sou melhor que você, by Maurício Pacheco, and I'm Wishing, from the film Snow White and the Seven Dwarfs, are mixed with timbres from iron shovels, electronic percussion and the unpredictable theremin, the "grandfather" of all modern synthesizers. The project also performed at the now-defunct Free Jazz festival (today the TIM Festival), even receiving an initial boo from an audience not accustomed to the project's aesthetic. The album was included in the book 1001 Albums You Must Hear Before You Die.

== Discography ==
- Moreno+2: Máquina de Escrever Música (2000, ROCKiT!)
  - released by Luaka Bop first as Moreno Veloso+2: Music Typewriter (2001) and later as Moreno+2: Music Typewriter (2005)
- Domenico+2: Sincerely Hot (2003, Luaka Bop)
- Kassin+2: Futurismo (2006, Luaka Bop)
