= Ventura (Los Hermanos album) =

Studio album by Los Hermanos
- Released: May 7, 2003
- Recorded: January 20, 2003-February 23, 2003
- Genres: Indie rock; art rock; samba rock
- Length: 51:53
- Label: Bertelsmann Music Group
- Producer: Alexandre Kassin

Los Hermanos chronology
Bloco do Eu Sozinho (2001)	Ventura (2003)	4 (2005)

Professional ratings
Review scores
Source	Rating
Omelete	4/5 stars
The Music Box	4.5/5 stars

Ventura is the third album by Brazilian band Los Hermanos, released in 2003. It was the first work of a Brazilian band to be made available – illegally – on the internet before its official release.

It was considered by the Brazilian edition of Rolling Stone as the 68th greatest Brazilian album. In September 2012, it was elected by the audience of Radio Eldorado FM, of Estadao.com e of Caderno C2+Música (both the latter belong to newspaper O Estado de S. Paulo) as the best Brazilian album ever.

Ventura was certified gold by the Brazilian Association of Record Producers after surpassing 50,000 sold copies. When the album was ready to be delivered, the band was met with Abril Music's bankruptcy in late 2002. Los Hermanos received offers from independent labels, such as Trama and Deckdisc, however, the band secured a deal with BMG, which bought part of the catalogue and brought the band as their artist, alongside bands such as Capital Inicial and Titãs.

== Track listing ==
No.	Title	Writer(s)	Length
1.	"Samba a Dois"	Marcelo Camelo	3:17
2.	"O Vencedor"	Marcelo Camelo	3:20
3.	"Tá Bom"	Marcelo Camelo	2:18
4.	"Ultimo Romance"	Rodrigo Amarante	4:25
5.	"Do Sétimo Andar"	Rodrigo Amarante	3:46
6.	"A Outra"	Marcelo Camelo	3:35
7.	"Cara Estranho"	Marcelo Camelo	3:25
8.	"O Velho e o Moço"	Rodrigo Amarante	4:03
9.	"Além Do Que Se Vê"	Marcelo Camelo	3:50
10.	"O Pouco Que Sobrou"	Marcelo Camelo	3:03
11.	"Conversa de Botas Batidas"	Marcelo Camelo	4:00
12.	"Deixa o Verão"	Rodrigo Amarante	2:39
13.	"Do Lado de Dentro"	Marcelo Camelo	2:43
14.	"Um Par"	Rodrigo Amarante	2:57
15.	"De Onde Vem A Calma"	Marcelo Camelo	4:10
Total length:			51:53

== Personnel ==
- Choir/Chorus - Alexandre Werneck
- Choir/Chorus, Effects, Keyboards - Bruno Medina
- Trumpet - Bubu Trompete
- Choir/Chorus - Diego Medina
- Clarinet - Edu Morelenbaum
- Tuba - Eliezer Rodriguez
- Choir/Chorus - Estevao Case
- Bass, Guitar, Background Vocals - Gabriel Bubu
- Flugelhorn, Trumpet - Jesse Sadoc Filho
- Bass, Choir/Chorus, Guitar - Kassin
- Choir/Chorus, Primary Artist - Los Hermanos
- Bass, Choir/Chorus, Composer, Guitar, Lead Vocals, Rattle - Marcelo Camelo
- Trombone - Mauro Zacharias
- Choir/Chorus - Mila Burns
- Choir/Chorus - Marcio Pimenta
- Choir/Chorus - Nervoso
- Bongos, Claves, Congas, Cowbell - Pepe Cisneros
- Bass, Choir/Chorus, Composer, Guitar, Lead Vocals, Vocals - Rodrigo Amarante
- Drums - Rodrigo Barba
- Trombone - Serginho Trombone
- Rattle - Stephane San Juan
- Choir/Chorus - Thiago Camelo
- Baritone Saxophone, Tuba - Ze Canuto
- Baritone Saxophone - Indio

== Certifications ==
Region	Certification	Sales/Shipments
Brazil – ABPD	Gold	100,000
