= Australia Tour EP 2002 =

EP (live) by Pernice Brothers
- Released: November 13, 2003
- Recorded: January 2002
- Genre: Indie rock
- Length: 20:44
- Label: Ashmont Records
- Producer: Joe Pernice

Pernice Brothers chronology
Yours, Mine & Ours (2003)	Australia Tour EP 2002 (2003)	Nobody's Watching/Nobody's Listening (2005)

Professional ratings
Review scores
Source	Rating
AllMusic	4/5 stars

Australia Tour EP 2002 is an EP released by Pernice Brothers, consisting of reworked, "stripped-down" versions of songs from the band's first two albums (Overcome by Happiness and The World Won't End). The songs were recorded during an Australian tour in January 2002. The track listing on the CD release is incorrect, with "All I Know" listed as track 2 and "Flaming Wreck" listed as track 3. The correct track listing is below.

== Track listing ==
All tracks are written by Joe Pernice.

No.	Title	Length
1.	"Dimmest Star"	4:10
2.	"Flaming Wreck"	4:49
3.	"All I Know"	2:40
4.	"Cronulla Breakdown"	2:57
5.	"Bright Side"	4:08
