= Thom Monahan =

American musicc and scripted audio producer

- Born: Massachusetts
- Occupations: Record producer; scripted drama audio producer; audio engineer; musician
- Years active: 1991-present
- Spouse: Shirley Halperin (m.2004)

Thom Monahan is an American record and scripted drama audio producer, engineer and musician. He has worked with artists including Fruit Bats, Devendra Banhart, Chris Robinson Brotherhood, and Peter Bjorn and John.

== Career ==
Monahan began his career playing bass with the Lilys.He earned his first credit as a producer on the Scud Mountain Boys' debut album, Dance The Night Away. Following the release of the album, Scuds singer Joe Pernice asked him to play bass for his newly-formed band, Pernice Brothers.In addition to playing live and in the studio, he produced, engineered, and mixed the band's 1998 debut album, Overcome by Happiness.

In 2005, Monahan moved to Los Angeles, where he recorded artists including Chris Robinson Brotherhood, Fruit Bats and Vetiver at his home studio, and produced songs for television shows including Weeds, Parenthood, Skins, Grey's Anatomy, and Entourage. He also worked frequently with San Francisco artists at the Hangar in Sacramento, where he first met Barnhard.

== Personal life ==
Monahan lives in Los Angeles. He and his wife, Shirley Halperin, a magazine editor, were married in 2004.

== Selected discography ==
Year	Artist	Release	Credit
1995	Scud Mountain Boys	Dance the Night Away	Producer, mixer, engineer
1995	Scud Mountain Boys	Massachusetts	Producer, engineer, mixer
1996	The Lilys	Better Can't Make Your Life Better	Arranger, musician, composer
1996	Silver Jews	The Natural Bridge	Engineer, mixer
1997	The Lilys	Services (For the Soon to Be Departed)	Arranger, composer, musician
1998	Pernice Brothers	Overcome by Happiness	Producer, engineer, mixer, musician
2000	Chappaquiddick Skyline	Chappaquiddick Skyline	Producer, engineer, mixer, musician
2000	J Mascis + The Fog	More Light	Engineer
2001	Beachwood Sparks	Once We Were Trees	Producer, engineer, mixer
2001	Pernice Brothers	The World Won't End	Producer, engineer, mixer, musician
2002	J Mascis + The Fog	Free So Free	Engineer
2003	Pernice Brothers	Yours, Mine & Ours	Producer, engineer, mixer, musician
2004	Vetiver	Vetiver	Producer, engineer, mixer
2005	Devendra Banhart	Cripple Crow	Producer, engineer, mixer
2005	Devendra Banhart	"Heard Somebody Say" (from Cripple Crow)	Producer, engineer, mixer
2006	Vetiver	"You May Be Blue"	Producer, engineer, mixer
2006	Vetiver	To Find Me Gone	Producer, engineer, mixer
2006	Brightblack Morning Light	Brightblack Morning Light	Producer, engineer, mixer
2007	Lavender Diamond	Imagine Our Love	Producer, engineer
2007	Pop Levi	The Return to Form Black Magick Party	Mixer
2007	Devendra Banhart	Love Above All	Producer, engineer, mixer
2007	Brad Laner	Neighbor Singing	Mixer
2008	John Doe	"The Golden State" (Neighbors remix)	Producer, engineer, mixer
2008	Vetiver	Thing of the Past	Producer, engineer, mixer
2008	Vetiver	More of the Past	Producer, engineer, mixer
2008	Gary Louris	Vagabonds	Producer, engineer
2008	The Chapin Sisters	Lake Bottom	Producer, engineer, mixer, musician
2008	Little Joy	Little Joy	Producer, engineer, mixer
2009	Vetiver	Tight Knit	Producer, engineer, mixer
2009	Au Revoir Simone	Still Night, Still Light	Producer, engineer, mixer
2009	Alela Diane	To Be Still	Mixer
2009	Jason Lytle	Yours Truly, the Commuter	Mixer
2010	Kevin Barker	You & Me	Producer, engineer, mixer
2010	Fruit Bats	"Papa Hobo" (from Ceremony soundtrack)	Mixer
2010	Eric Johnson	Ceremony (score)	Engineer
2010	Sarah Lee Guthrie & Johnny Irion	Bright Examples	Producer, engineer, mixer
2011	Vetiver	The Errant Charm	Producer, engineer, mixer, musician
2011	Fujiya & Miyagi	Ventriloquizzing	Producer, engineer, mixer
2011	Fruit Bats	Tripper	Producer, mixer
2011	Jonathan Wilson	Gentle Spirit	Mixer
2011	The Donkeys	Born with Stripes	Mixer
2011	Papercuts	Fading Parade	Producer, engineer, mixer
2012	He's My Brother She's My Sister	Nobody Dances in This Town	Producer, engineer, mixer
2012	Night Moves	Colored Emotions	Producer, engineer, mixer
2012	Beachwood Sparks	The Tarnished Gold	Producer, engineer, mixer
2012	Chris Robinson Brotherhood	Big Moon Ritual	Producer, engineer, mixer
2012	Chris Robinson Brotherhood	The Magic Door	Producer, engineer, mixer
2012	Neal Casal	Sweeten the Distance	Producer, engineer, mixer
2012	Sera Cahoone	Deer Creek Canyon	Producer, engineer, mixer
2012	Mary Epworth	Dream Life	Mixer
2012	Iggy Pop & Zig Zags	"If I'm in Luck I Might Get Picked Up"	Mixer
2012	Galen Pehrson & Death Grips	"True Vulture"	Mixer
2013	Möbius & Plank	Who's That Man: A Tribute to Conny Plank (Fujiya & Miyagi remix, "Conditionierer")	Mixer
2014	Chris Robinson Brotherhood	Phosphorescent Harvest	Producer, engineer, mixer
2014	Nina Persson	Animal Heart	Mixer
2014	Medicine	Home Everywhere	Mixer
2014	Vashti Bunyan	Heartleap	Engineer
2015	Vetiver	Complete Strangers	Producer, engineer, mixer
2015	EDJ	EDJ	Producer, engineer, mixer
2016	Wild Nothing	Life of Pause	Producer, engineer
2016	Peter Bjorn and John	"If I Was a Spy" (Yo Gabba Gabba!)	Producer, engineer, mixer
2016	Peter Bjorn and John	Breakin' Point	Producer (two tracks), engineer
2016	Juana Molina, Devendra Banhart & Vetiver	"Hay Que Ver se Voy"	Engineer, mixer
2016	Liv	Wings of Love	Producer, engineer
2017	Bedouine	Bedouine	Mixer
2017	Dave Depper	Emotional Freedom Technique	Mixer
2017	Mary Epworth	Elytral	Producer, engineer, mixer
2018	Neko Case	Hell-On	Engineer
2018	Peter Bjorn and John	Darker Days	Engineer
2018	Meg Baird and Mary Lattimore	Ghost Forests	Producer, engineer, mixer
2019	Bedouine	Bird Songs of a Killjoy	Mixer
2025	Fruit Bats	Babyman	Producer, engineer, mixer
2026	Boys Go To Jupiter		Mixing
2026	Fruit Bats	The Landfill	Mixing, additional production
2026	Out on In	EP series	Producer, engineer, mixer, musician
