= Nobody's Watching/Nobody's Listening =

Live album /DVD by Pernice Brothers
- Released: January 25, 2005
- Recorded: January–June 2004
- Genre: Indie rock
- Length: 41:54
- Label: Ashmont Records
- Producer: Joe Pernice

Pernice Brothers chronology
Australia Tour EP 2002 (2003)	Nobody's Watching/Nobody's Listening (2005)	Discover a Lovelier You (2005)

Professional ratings
Review scores
Source	Rating
AllMusic	4/5 stars
Pitchfork	(7.4/10)

Nobody's Watching/Nobody's Listening is a combination CD/DVD, released by Pernice Brothers in 2005. It consists of material recorded on the Pernice Brothers' 2004 tour, including a cover of a song by frontman Joe Pernice's former band, the Scud Mountain Boys, as well as a Pretenders cover.

The DVD includes the videos for "Baby in Two" and "Weakest Shade of Blue" (two cuts from previous album Yours, Mine and Ours), as well as a tour diary.

== Track listing ==
All tracks are written by Joe Pernice except as noted.

No.	Title	Writer(s)	Length
1.	"Water Ban"		3:36
2.	"Working Girls"		2:56
3.	"Our Time Has Passed"		3:44
4.	"Crestfallen"		3:11
5.	"Monkey Suit"		2:50
6.	"She Heightened Everything"		2:37
7.	"Sometimes I Remember"		2:49
8.	"Clear Spot"		2:05
9.	"Wait to Stop"		4:06
10.	"Grudge F*ck" (Scud Mountain Boys cover, 1996)		5:43
11.	"Talk of the Town" (The Pretenders cover, 1981)	Chrissie Hynde	3:08
12.	"Flaming Wreck"		5:19

== DVD contents ==
1. "Nobody's Watching" (tour diary)
2. "Baby in Two" (video)
3. "Baby in Two" (storyboard)
4. "Weakest Shade of Blue" (video)
5. "Weakest Shade of Blue" (storyboard)
