= Mayoralty of Marty Walsh =

2015–2021 mayoralty in Boston, US

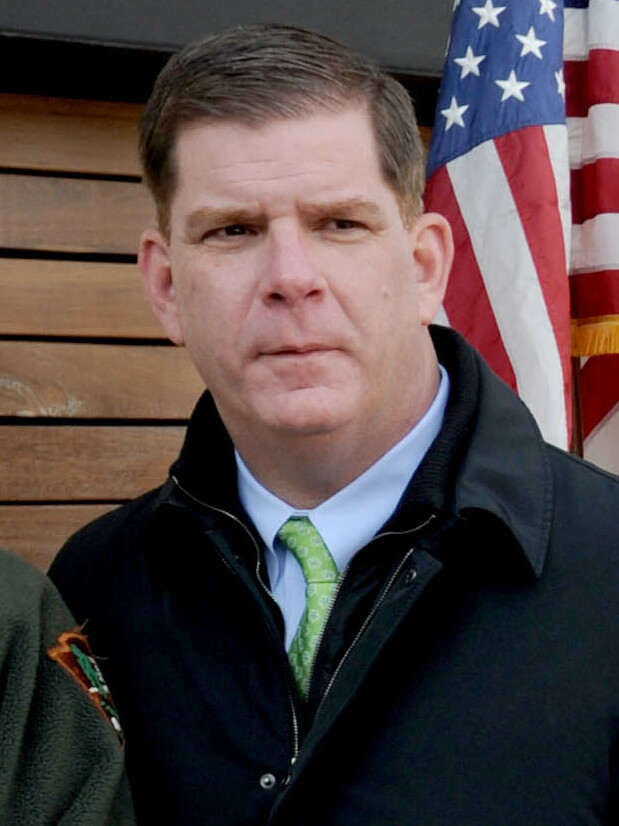
- Mayoralty of Marty Walsh; January 6, 2014 – March 22, 2021
- Mayor: Marty Walsh
- Party: Democratic
- Election: 2013, 2017

Marty Walsh served as mayor of Boston, Massachusetts from 2014 through 2021.

Walsh was regarded as friendly towards real estate developers, and the city experienced a building boom during his mayoralty. In 2021, Walsh successfully added to the city's zoning code policies inspired by the federal affirmatively furthering fair housing policy. While Walsh supported Boston's bid for the 2024 Summer Olympics, he ultimately reneged on his commitment to signing the Host City Contract's financial guarantee which contributed to the collapse of the bid. In 2016, Walsh's administration and General Electric struck a deal that saw corporation to move its headquarters to Boston. Walsh supported the passage an ordinance in the city council which regulated short-term rental of housing units, which he signed into law in 2018.

As mayor, Walsh successfully negotiated for a 40-minute school day extension in Boston Public Schools. However, his overall handling of the city's schools has been assessed as poor. Walsh served in the leadership of the C40 Cities Climate Leadership Group. During much of Walsh's mayoralty, Boston struggled with homelessness at Mass and Cass, a matter that was unresolved at the time Walsh departed from office. In 2014, Walsh signed the Boston Trust Act, a so-called "sanctuary city" ordinance, into law. Amid the first Trump administration's federal hostility towards such policies, Walsh voiced his continued support for the city remaining a sanctuary city. In 2015, Walsh supported the passage of a city ordinance to provide municipal employees with paid parental leave, which was passed and signed into law by Walsh. At the end of his tenure, Walsh dealt with the COVID-19 pandemic's impacts on Boston.

== Elections ==
=== 2013 ===
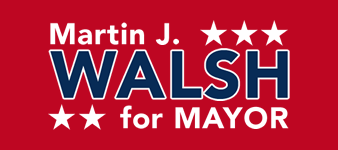
Walsh's 2013 mayoral campaign logo

In April 2013, Walsh announced he would run for Mayor of Boston in the 2013 mayoral election. Walsh resigned from his position as the head of the Boston Building Trades Council position in April 2013 after formally announcing his bid for mayor, but stayed on as the president of Laborer's Union Local 223 and remained a member of the Massachusetts House of Representatives while campaigning. When Walsh initially announced his candidacy, he lacked substantial name recognition outside of his own state house district.

Walsh campaigned on the promise to champion a 24-hour Boston, including extending the hours of operation of the "T" into the night. The MBTA answers to the Massachusetts Department of Transportation, which is a state and not city agency, but Walsh campaigned on the promise to extend MBTA service thanks to his tenure in the state house. "As a sixteen-year veteran of the House," he said, "I am uniquely qualified to negotiate transportation plans with the legislature."

David Scharfenberg of WBUR considered Walsh's candidacy as being, "built on his against-the-odds biography: a son of Irish immigrants who overcame a childhood fight against cancer and a young adult's struggle with alcoholism."

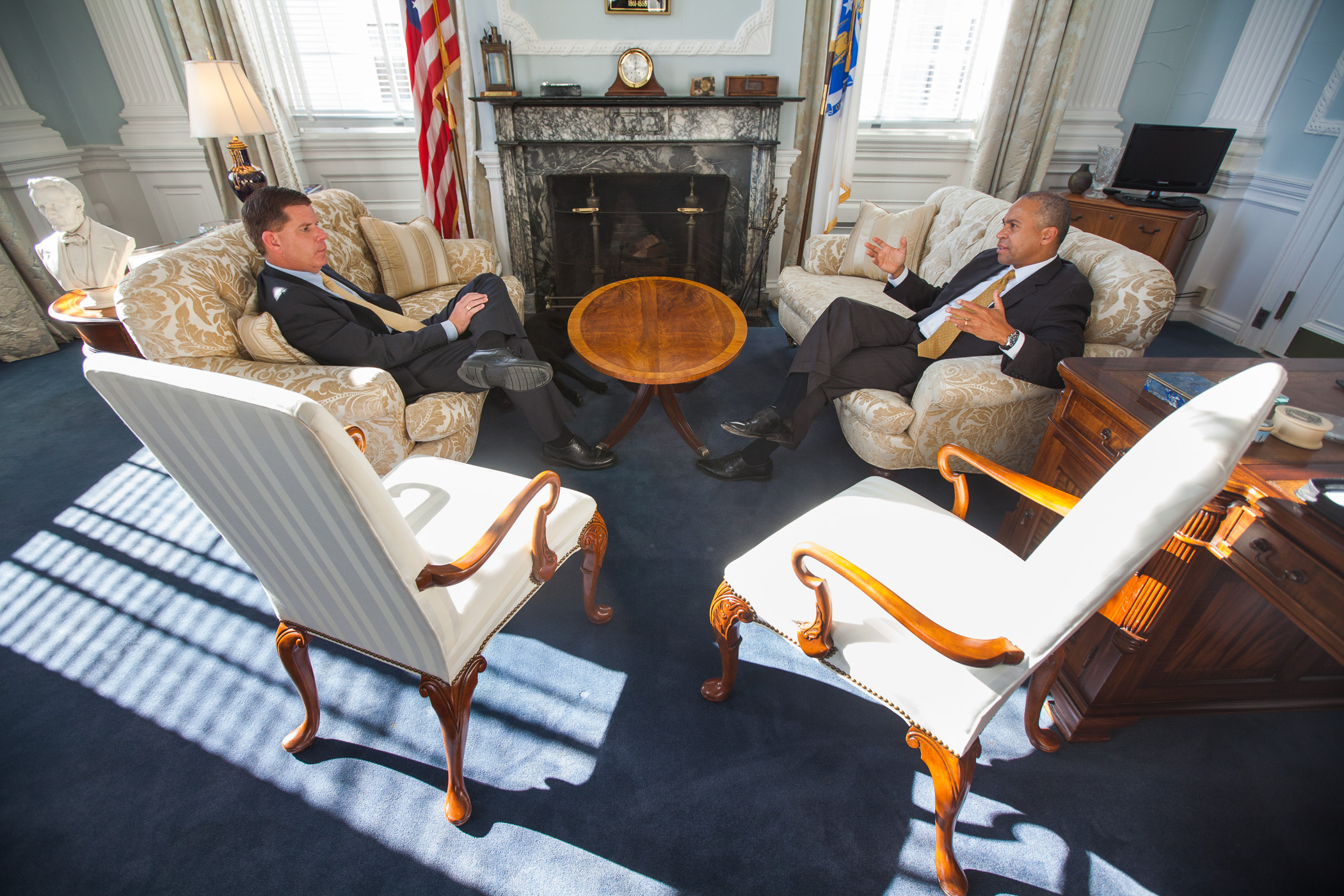
Walsh (left) meets with Governor Deval Patrick after having been elected mayor

On September 24, 2013, Walsh received a plurality of the vote, among twelve candidates in the mayoral preliminary election, with 18.4% of the vote. As a result, he advanced to the general election, facing second place vote-getter Boston City Councilor John R. Connolly, who received 17.2% of the vote. Walsh defeated Connolly in the general election on November 5, 2013, with 51.5% of the vote, compared to Connolly's 48.1%. Walsh's roughly 5,000-vote victory was aided by a strong performance in communities of color.

Walsh received strong funding from trade unions. Andrew Ryan of Boston.com wrote that the general election featured very few policy differences, and that Walsh won, in part, by projecting an "everyman" image and sharing a "compelling life story" involving his immigrant roots, childhood battle with cancer, and his battle with alcoholism. Ryan also credited the general election endorsements of eliminated mayoral candidates John Barros, Felix G. Arroyo, and Charlotte Golar Richie as helping Walsh to overcome Connolly's initial polling lead. These endorsements were particularly sought after due to the three eliminated contenders' popularity with the city's racial and ethnic minority communities. Golar Richie's endorsement was also regarded to hold potential sway with many women voters. Another factors that has been credited for Walsh's victory over Connolly in the general election was a last-minute half-million dollars in television advertising against Connolly and in support of Walsh, secretly funded by the Boston Teachers Union. Connolly was a supporter of charter schools, and his education reform proposals had run into opposition from the union. David Scharfenberg of WBUR wrote that Walsh secured his victory for having, "built a broad coalition that stretched down the eastern half of the city — from South Boston through the heart of black Boston and into a diverse Hyde Park." Yawu Miller of The Bay State Banner later described Walsh as having won the general election due to the support of an "odd coalition of voters" made up of, "a majority of the support from Black and Latino voters as well as white progressives and his conservative-leaning Dorchester/South Boston base." Walsh was sworn in as mayor on January 6, 2014.

=== 2017 ===
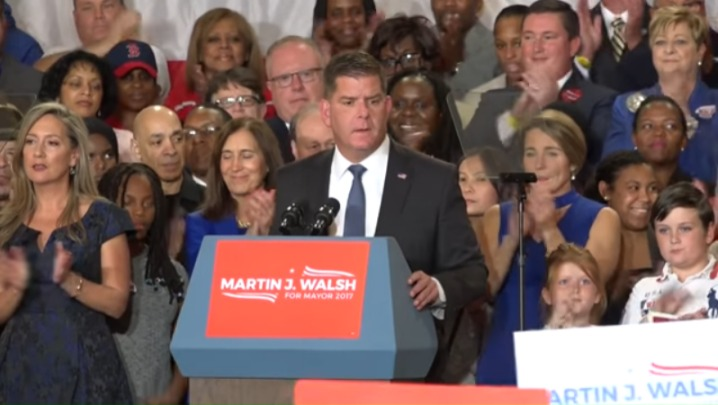
Walsh delivering a victory speech after his 2017 reelection

In July 2017, Walsh announced he would seek a second term in the 2017 mayoral election. On September 26, 2017, he received 62% of the vote in the preliminary election. He advanced to the general election and faced second place vote-getter, Boston City Councilor Tito Jackson, who had received 29% of the vote. Walsh defeated Jackson in the general election held on November 7, with 65% of the vote, compared to Jackson's 34%.

Walsh performed strongly in many neighborhoods, including South Boston, North End, West End, Beacon Hill, Chinatown, Neponset and areas of West Roxbury, Charlestown, Allston, Brighton, and East Boston. Some of the neighborhoods that Walsh carried in 2017 had favored Connolly in the 2013 election. Walsh, however, performed weakly in Roxbury and portions of Dorchester. Roxbury is regarded to be the "center" of Boston's Black community. Walsh's opponent, Jackson, is Black himself.

Walsh was sworn in for his second term on January 1, 2018; then-former vice-president Joe Biden presided at the ceremony.

== Relations with the Boston City Council ==
Boston's strong mayor form of government had conventionally limited the impact that members of the Boston City Council had on the city government. However, during Walsh's mayoralty, the Boston City Council began to increasingly wield its power. The body yielded less to the mayor than previous iterations of the council had in the preceding decades, and also made use of its subpoena powers for the first time in decades. In December 2019, Milton J. Valencia of The Boston Globe opined that, beginning under the City Council presidencies of Michelle Wu (in 2016 and 2017) and Andrea Campbell (beginning in 2018), the council had "been, perhaps, the most aggressive in recent history in pushing reforms, often to the left of the mayor, on issues addressing climate change and economic and racial equity."

In February 2024, David Bernstein of Boston magazine wrote that during and after his mayoralty, Boston's politics had been shifting away from where Walsh's were grounded, idiomatically writing that in the city of Boston "ideological and demographic sands...shift[ed] under Walsh when he was mayor," and had "remade the entire landscape" in the time after he left office. Representative of this, he observed, was the increase of progressives on the city council.

== Appointments and staffing decisions ==
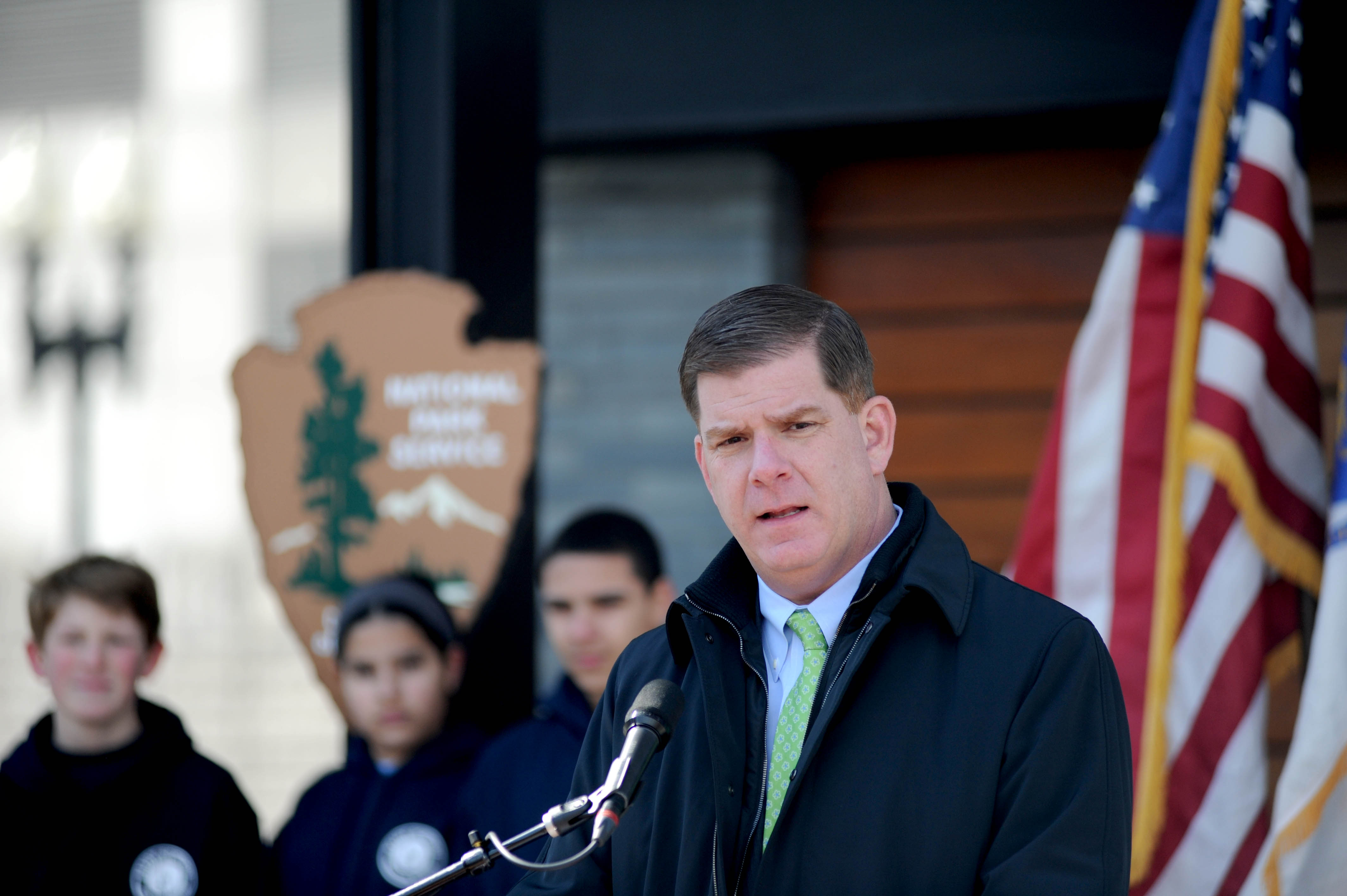
Walsh speaks in 2015

Soon after taking office, Walsh appointed a number of individuals to his staff. This included Joyce Linehan as his chief of policy. He hired Eugene O'Flaherty as the city's corporation counsel. Walsh also appointed William B. Evans the permanent commissioner of the Boston Police Department. Walsh also reappointed a number of cabinet chiefs from his predecessor, Tom Menino's, administration.

In his first term, Walsh created some new positions and departments within the mayor's office. In February 2014, he appointed John Barros as the city's first-ever chief of economic development. In December 2014, he created the Office of Diversity, headed by a chief diversity officer.

== Development and zoning ==
Walsh was seen as friendly towards real estate developers throughout his mayoralty, and Boston underwent a substantial building boom during his seven years in office. During the course of his mayoralty, officials in Boston granted approval to 7.7 million square feet of real estate developments, including more than 40,000 more housing units. Steve LeBlanc of The Associated Press wrote in 2021, "during his tenure as mayor, Walsh has overseen the city's ongoing rejuvenation, which has led to challenges that include gentrification and rising housing costs."

In September 2019, after a city official pled guilty in court to accepting bribes in exchange for peddling their influence on a member of the Zoning Board of Appeal (ZBA), Walsh ordered an independent investigation into the ZBA. The resulting investigation found no evidence of wrongdoing by members of the ZBA. Nevertheless, in February 2020 Walsh signed an executive order imposing a number of ethics requirements on the ZBA's members.

In December 2020, after it was advanced by a vote of the Boston City Council, Walsh announced that the city would become the first major United States city to put "affirmatively furthering fair housing" requirements into its zoning code. In January 2021, the Boston Zoning Commission unanimously voted to add them to the city's zoning code, and Walsh signed it into effect that month.

In January 2015, Walsh filed a lawsuit in an effort to stop a casino from being built in nearby Everett, Massachusetts. He dropped his legal objections in January 2016, after striking a deal between the city of Boston and Wynn Resorts, who were behind the Everett casino project.

Walsh supported an ordinance in the city council which regulated short-term rental of housing units. It passed in the City Council, and he signed it into law in June 2018. The ordinance restricted short-term rentals to owner-occupied housing units, required hosts to register with the city, and required the city to collect and publish data on short-term rentals. Airbnb sued the city over the ordinance; the suit was settled in August 2019 with an agreement which included having Airbnb hosts in Boston enter their ordinance-required city-issued registration number into the website, or face having their listings removed from the website.

In July 2020, construction began on a remodel of Boston City Hall Plaza, which Walsh and his administration had been working for years on planning for years.

== Economic matters ==
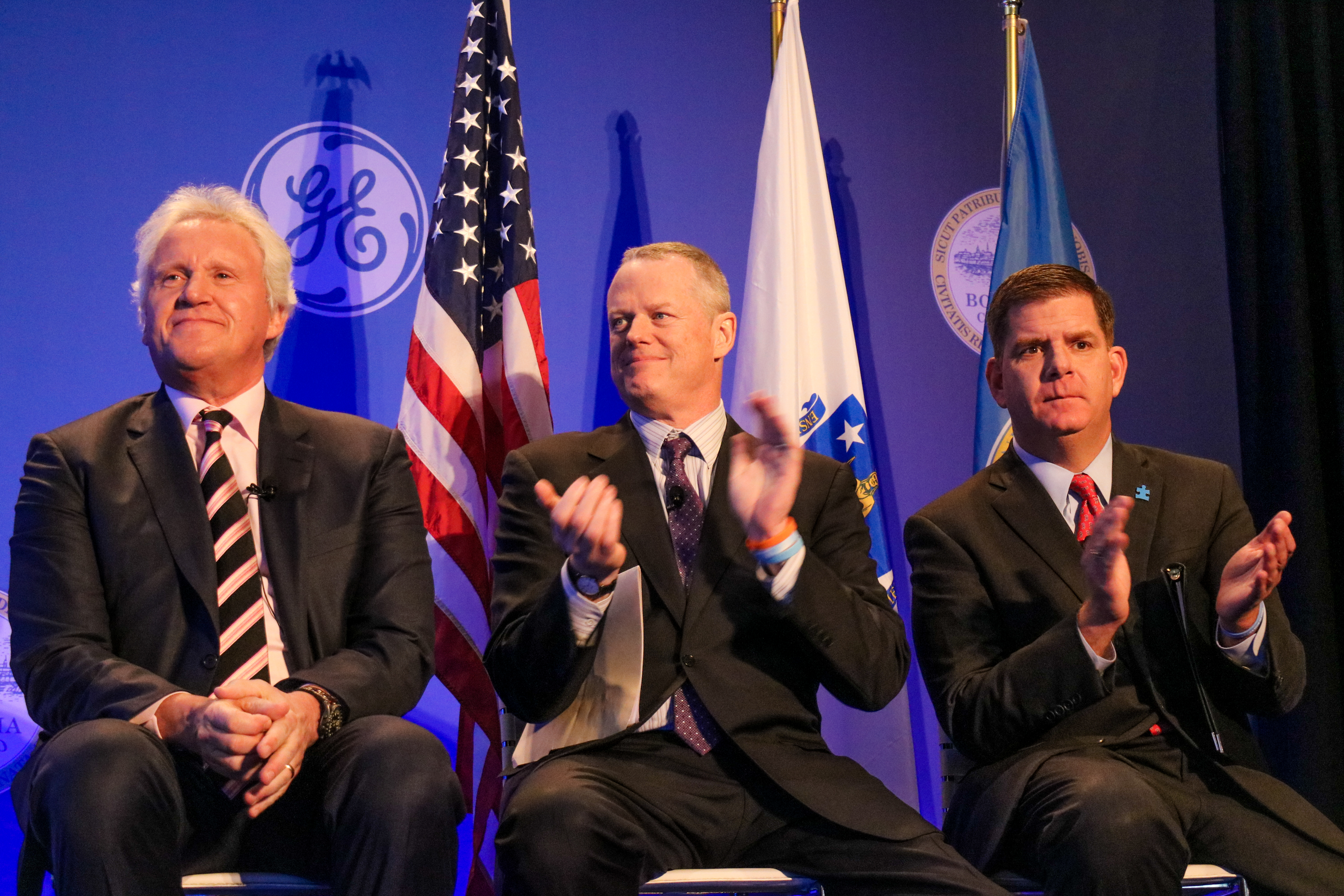
Walsh (right) with General Electric CEO Jeff Immelt (left) and Massachusetts Governor Charlie Baker (center) at the April 2016 formal announcement that General Electric had agreed to move its headquarters to Boston

After Walsh left office, the editorial board of The Boston Globe would opine that, as mayor, Walsh, "kept Boston on an even keel financially and invited economic growth". Similarly, Bill Forry of the Dorchester Reporter wrote that, prior to the outbreak of the COVID-19 pandemic, Walsh's tenure was characterized by, "remarkable growth and relative peace and prosperity." During Walsh's tenure, Boston maintained a AAA bond credit rating.

In January 2016, Boston struck a deal for General Electric to move their headquarters to the city. The city, together with the state government of Massachusetts, offered General Electric a combined $140 million in business incentives ($120 million in grants, and $25 million in city tax relief). Some critics argued that Boston had given General Electric a "sweetheart deal". However, The Boston Globe jointly named four deputies of Walsh and Governor Charlie Baker who had been involved in striking the deal as their "Bostonians of the Year" for their roles in the deal.

== Education ==
In Walsh's time as mayor, Boston cycled through several school superintendents, seeing two permanent and two interim superintendents over the duration of his mayoralty. A 2020 state audit of Boston Public Schools found the city to lack any, "clear, coherent, district-wide strategy for supporting low-performing schools."

Towards the end of 2014, Walsh proposed and negotiated a 40-minute extension to the school day of Boston Public Schools, which was implemented.

After the end of his tenure as mayor, the editorial board of The Boston Globe criticized Walsh's leadership on education, writing,

Walsh's record on public education — the single biggest part of the city's operating budget and arguably its most important obligation to its residents — was a profound disappointment. He cycled through school superintendents, depriving the system of needed stability. When the schools did attempt reform, like moving high schools to later start times, he folded at the first whiff of opposition. Walsh showed little appetite for tough decisions on education, such as consolidating schools in a system with huge overcapacity or reducing the bloated school transportation budget. By some measures, the schools are worse now than when he took office in 2014.

Similarly, Jon Keller of WBZ-TV considered Walsh to have had missteps in regards to handling public schools, writing at the end of Walsh's tenure that "too many of the city's schoolkids continue to lag behind."

== Environmental matters ==
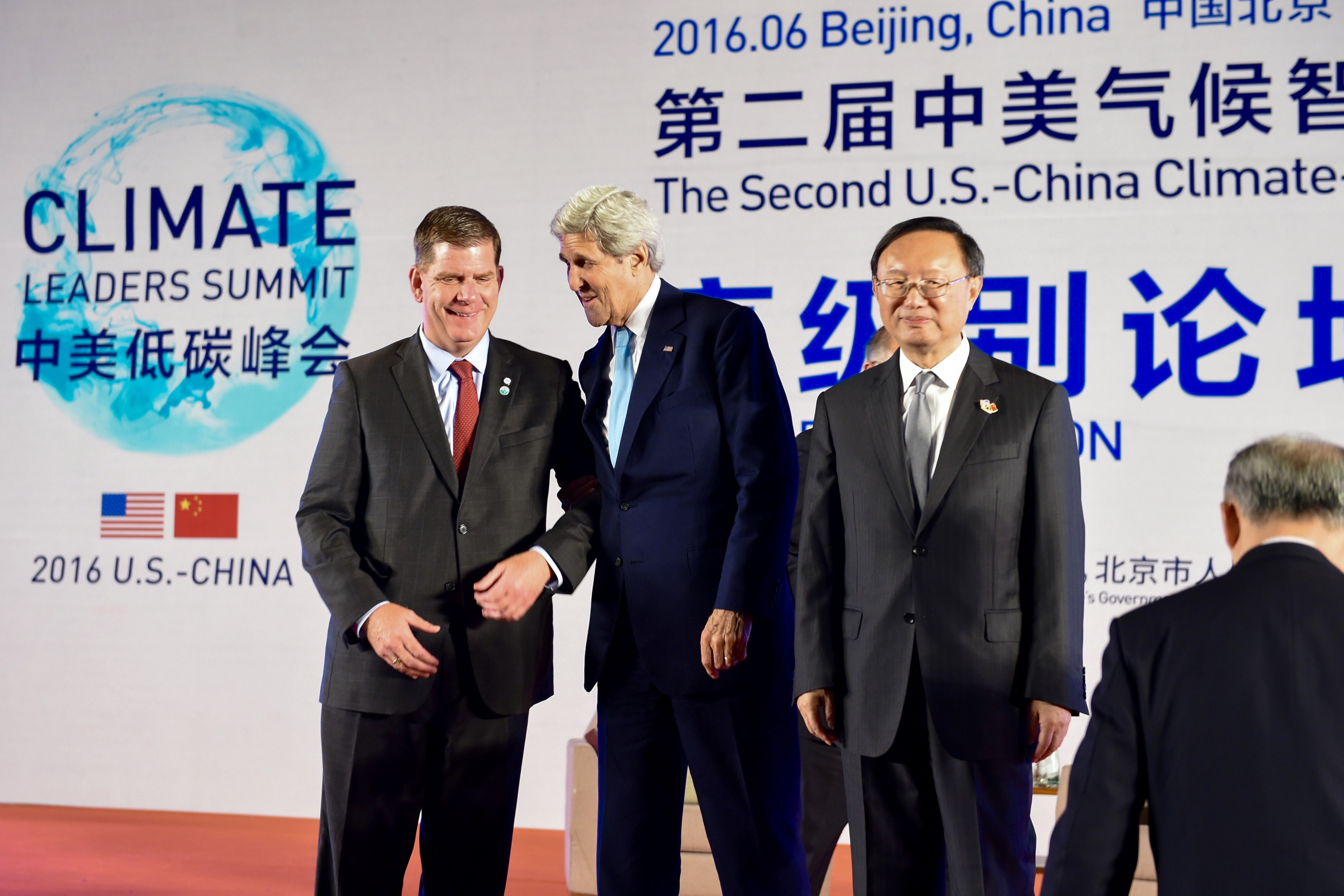
Walsh with United States Secretary of State John Kerry and Chinese State Councillor Yang Jiechi at the 2016 U.S.-China Climate-Smart Low-Carbon Cities Summit in Beijing

In 2015, Walsh launched the Climate Ready Boston initiative to prepare Boston for the effects of climate change.

Walsh served in the leadership of C40 Cities Climate Leadership Group.

In 2017, Walsh spoke in opposition to President Donald Trump's decision to withdraw the United States from the Paris Agreement.

In 2016, Walsh's administration opposed a proposed plastic bag ban that was debated by the Boston City Council in 2016. However, in December 2017, Walsh signed into law a plastic bag ban authored by City Councilors Michelle Wu and Matt O'Malley.

== Homelessness ==
On October 8, 2014, Walsh, citing the advisement of various City departments, agencies and leaders, and the Massachusetts Department of Transportation, ordered the closure of the Long Island Bridge due to disrepair and the evacuation of the programs for the homeless located on Long Island. Later that year, he unveiled plans to renovate a facility to house hundreds of homeless people displaced due to the closure of the Long Island Bridge.

In his 2018 second mayoral inauguration address, Walsh announced establishment of the Boston's Way Home Fund, with the aim of raising $10 million to establish 200 units of permanent supportive housing for the chronically homeless. The fund met its $10 million goal in 2020, two years earlier than its target.

In November 2019, Walsh announced that the city had obtained a $4.7 million grant from the United States Department of Housing and Urban Development that would go towards housing homeless youth. In March 2020, he announced that the city had secured hundreds in additional interim bed capacity to house homeless.

While Walsh, in 2019, outlined plans to deal with the homelessness crisis on Boston's so-called "Methadone Mile" (also known as "Mass & Cass" for the intersection of Massachusetts Avenue and Melena Cass Boulevard), it persisted to be a problem when he left office in 2021.

== Employer practices, vendor contracting, wages ==
In 2014, Walsh signed an executive order to require that the city only work with vendors who agreed to certify that they do not commit wage theft against their employees by withholding or delaying payment owed to employees. The executive ordered the city government to require its vendors to certify that they are in compliance with federal and state wager laws, and disclose to the city any past violations of those laws.

In March 2015, Walsh and Councilor Michelle Wu co-authored an op-ed in The Boston Globe calling paid parental leave, "a must for working families". Roughly a month later the Boston City Council passed a paid parental leave ordinance that was authored by Wu. The ordinance provided city employees with six weeks of paid parental leave after childbirth, stillbirth, or adoption. Walsh signed the ordinance into law in May.

In April 2016, Walsh came out in support of having Massachusetts implement a gradual increase of its minimum wage to $15. He formed a Minimum Wage Task Force to lobby for a statewide adoption of a $15 per hour minimum wage.

In 2016, Walsh announced goals to increase minority participation in municipal contracts. However, in 2021, a study completed for the city by BBC Research & Consulting found that, during Walsh's first term, only 2.5% of the $2.1 billion in city contracts awarded during Walsh's first term were awarded to minority-owned businesses, and only 8.5% went to businesses owned by women. The city-commissioned study also found that, between July 1, 2014, and June 30, 2019, only 1.2% of the $2.2 billion that Boston spent on contracts and procurement went to Black-owned or Latino-owned businesses. This came despite the fact that the study found that it should be expected that nearly 5% of contracting and procurement should go to such companies based upon the availability of such companies for municipal work. In February 2021, Walsh signed an executive order making it a stated goal for 25% of city contracts to be awarded to businesses owned by minorities or women.

== Sports events and venues ==
=== Olympic bid ===
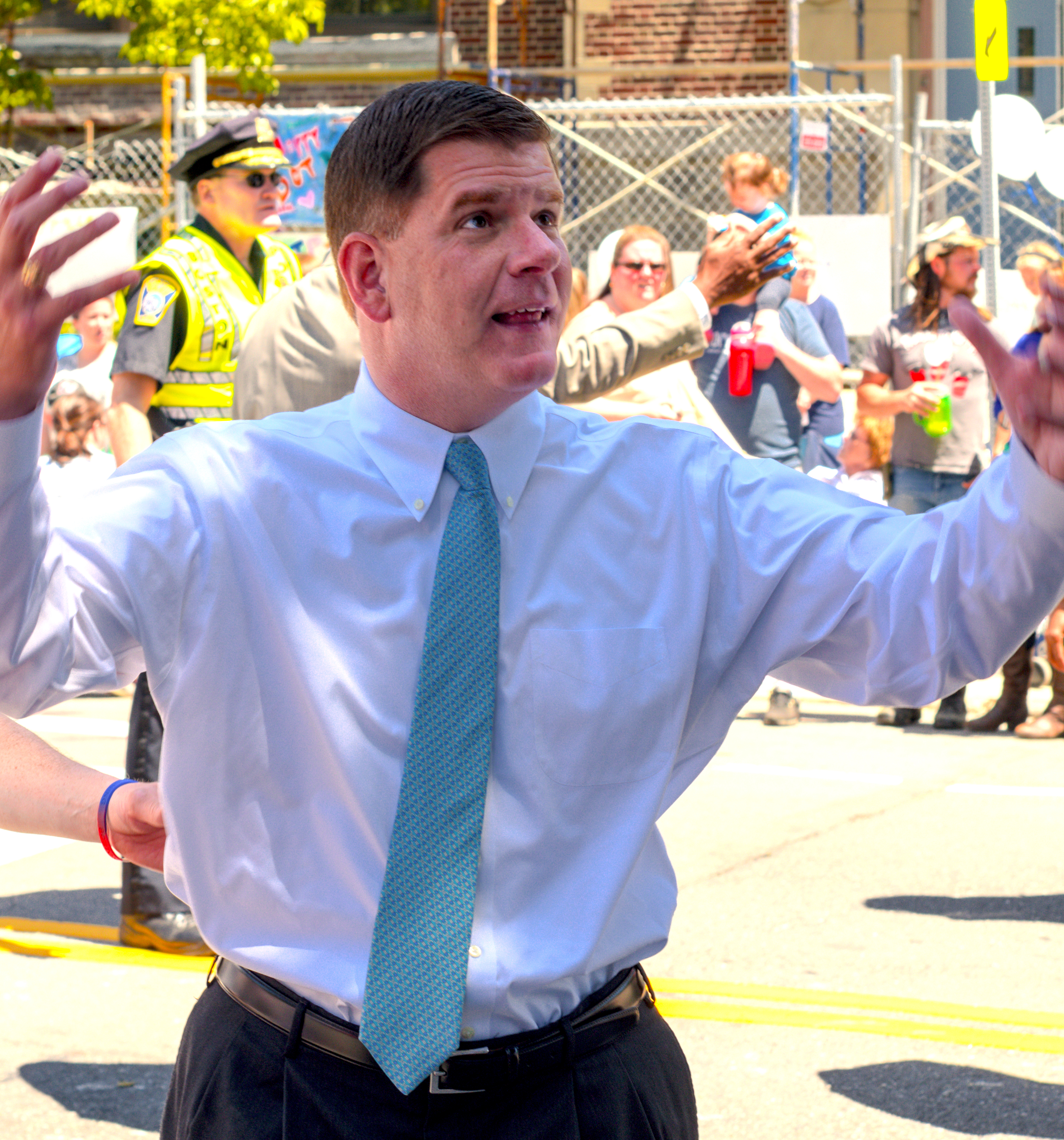
Walsh participating in the 2015 Dorchester Day Parade

Boston was originally selected as the United States' bid city for the 2024 Summer Olympics. Walsh supported the bid, regarding it as an opportunity to elevate Boston's international profile. In October 2014, he signed a letter stating that he would sign the Host City Contract without reservation; however, in July 2015, he stated that he was not comfortable signing the financial guarantee in its current form at that time. This was one of a number of events that led to the cancellation of Boston's bid for the Olympics on July 27, 2015. Boston's bid had run into opposition from residents.

Walsh supported the bid during its early stages, and expressed confidence in July 2014 that the city stood in "a good position" as a prospective host city.

After Boston was selected in January 2015 as the United States' bid city, Walsh pledged both that the bid would be run in a manner transparent with the public, and that taxpayer money would not be utilized to construct sports venues for the games, remarking,

I promise this will be the most open, inclusive and transparent process in Olympic history...We are not going to be using taxpayers' money to be building venues.

Walsh also outlined plans for the city to host nine public meetings over the course of 2015 to discuss the bid.

In March 2015, Walsh spent the majority of his annual mayoral speech to the Boston Municipal Research Bureau touting the positives of an Olympics in Boston. He justified the bid as a once-in-a-lifetime opportunity for the city, and expressed confidence that the games could be held in Boston without leaving taxpayers to cover its expenses, asserting that "privately funded and..fiscally sound" games had been held before in the United States, noting that the 1984 Summer Olympics in Los Angeles left its host committee with a fiscal surplus that was reinvested in local youth sports, and cited the Centennial Olympic Park constructed for the 1996 Summer Olympics as having been a "catalyst for downtown resurgence" in Atlanta. Walsh also argued that a games would serve as a "catalyst" to motivate the state government to invest in Boston's transit infrastructure. While conceding that public debate surrounding the bid had become heated, but blamed much of this on public misconception and confusion. Walsh also noted that even if the bid failed, it could still leave a positive benefit in the city, noting that New York City's failed bid for the 2012 Summer Olympics had led to the redevelopment of Hudson Yards. As Walsh gave his full-throated backing to the bid, many of Walsh's political allies also rallied around defending the bid against criticisms. However, opposition mounted, including from the group No Boston Olympics.

During the July 27 announcement of the cancellation of the city's bid, Walsh conceded that a games in Boston might pose genuine risks of tax increases in order to fund games-related infrastructure.

=== Cancelled IndyCar race ===
Walsh worked to have IndyCar host a race at the South Boston Seaport, receiving cooperation from Baker's gubernatorial administration in these efforts (the race circuit would have included land owned by the state). The Grand Prix of Boston was scheduled to take place on Labor Day weekend in September 2016. It would have been the first IndyCar race to take place in Boston. The planned race faced opposition, including from residents of nearby neighborhoods who expressed concerns over impacts such as noise and additional traffic. In May 2016, Walsh and IndyCar signed an agreement to host the event. However, in March 2016 Indycar abruptly cancelled the event. The president of the Grand Prix of Boston's corporate board blamed the cancellation on demands made by Walsh's mayoral administration, which he characterized as unreasonable. Both Walsh and the spokesperson for IndyCar later expressed an openness to hosting a race in Boston sometime in the future.

=== Other sports ===
During Walsh's mayoralty, Gillette Stadium (in the Boston metropolitan area) was included as a potential venue in the successful United 2026 bid for North America to host the 2026 FIFA World Cup. Walsh was listed as an honorary chairperson of the United 2026 bid.

Walsh held talks with New England Revolution team owner Robert Kraft about the potential construction of a soccer specific stadium for the team in the city.

== Public health and safety ==
=== Policing ===
Soon after taking office, Walsh appointed William B. Evans the permanent commissioner of the Boston Police Department. In 2018, Walsh appointed William G. Gross as commissioner, making Gross the first African American individual to hold the position. In January 2021, upon Gross' retirement, Walsh made Dennis White, also African American, the new commissioner of the Boston Police Department. Days after appointing White, Walsh suspended him pending an investigation into allegations of domestic violence. Walsh is considered not to have properly vetted White before appointing him.

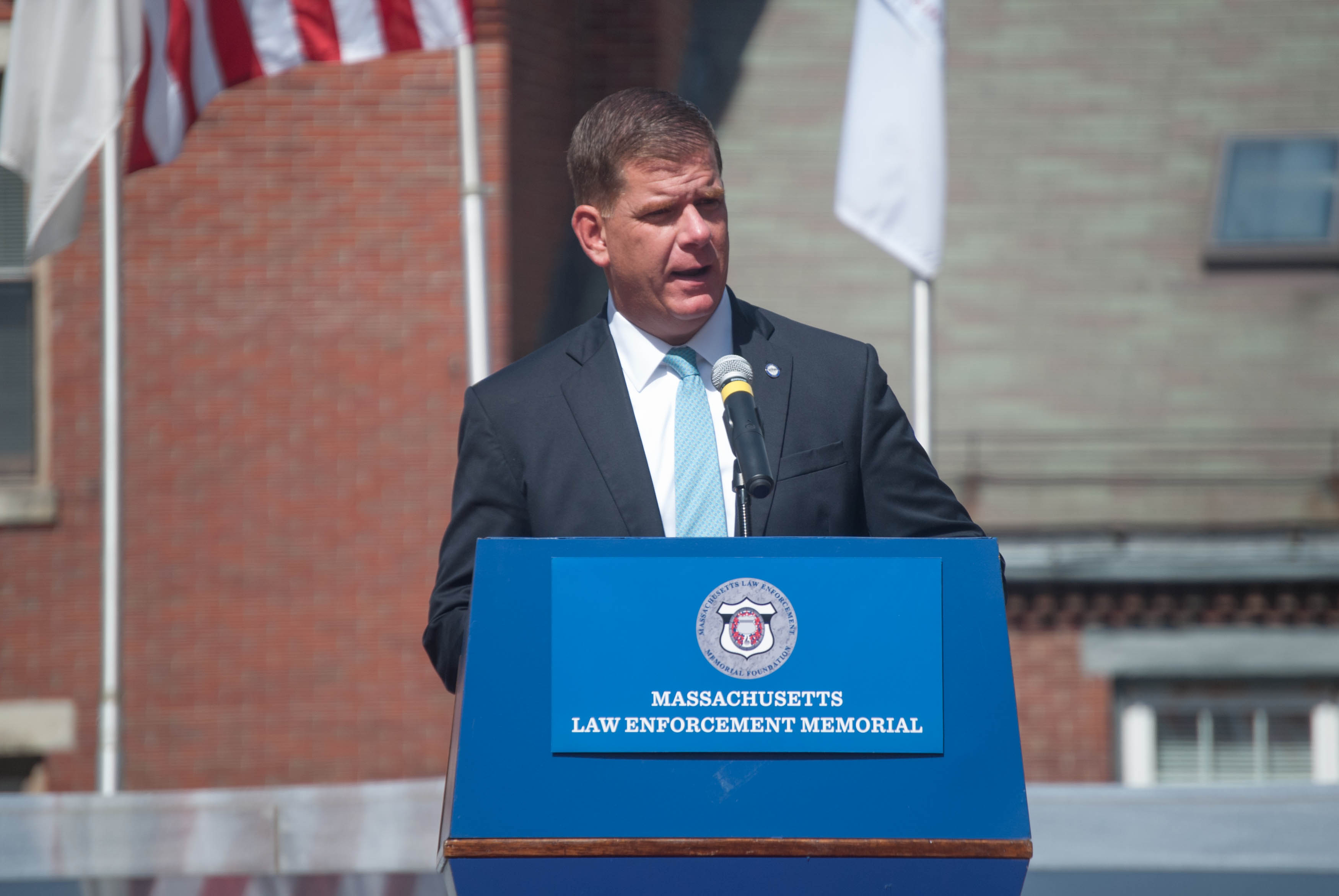
Walsh speaks at the Massachusetts Law Enforcement Memorial in 2016

While Walsh was initially hesitant to implement police body cameras, in 2016 his administration launched a body camera pilot program. He allotted $2 million of the 2019 city budget to fund a police body camera program.

During the George Floyd protests, Boston area activists called on Walsh to reduce spending on Boston Police Department by at least 10% for the 2021 fiscal budget. He instead diverted $12 million from police overtime spending, less than 3% of the overall department budget. Ultimately, the department overspent that year's overtime budget.

In June 2020, Walsh created the Boston Police Reform Taskforce. In October 2020, he pledged to adopt all of the final recommendations that the taskforce had made. In January 2021, he signed into law an ordinance that created a police accountability office, one of the recommendations the taskforce had made.

In January 2021, Walsh vetoed an ordinance that would have limited the use of tear gas, pepper spray, and rubber bullets by the Boston Police Department, calling into question the "practicality and potential consequences" of the proposals in the ordinance. He also argued that it infringed on the authority of the police commissioner.

=== Drug laws and opioid crisis ===
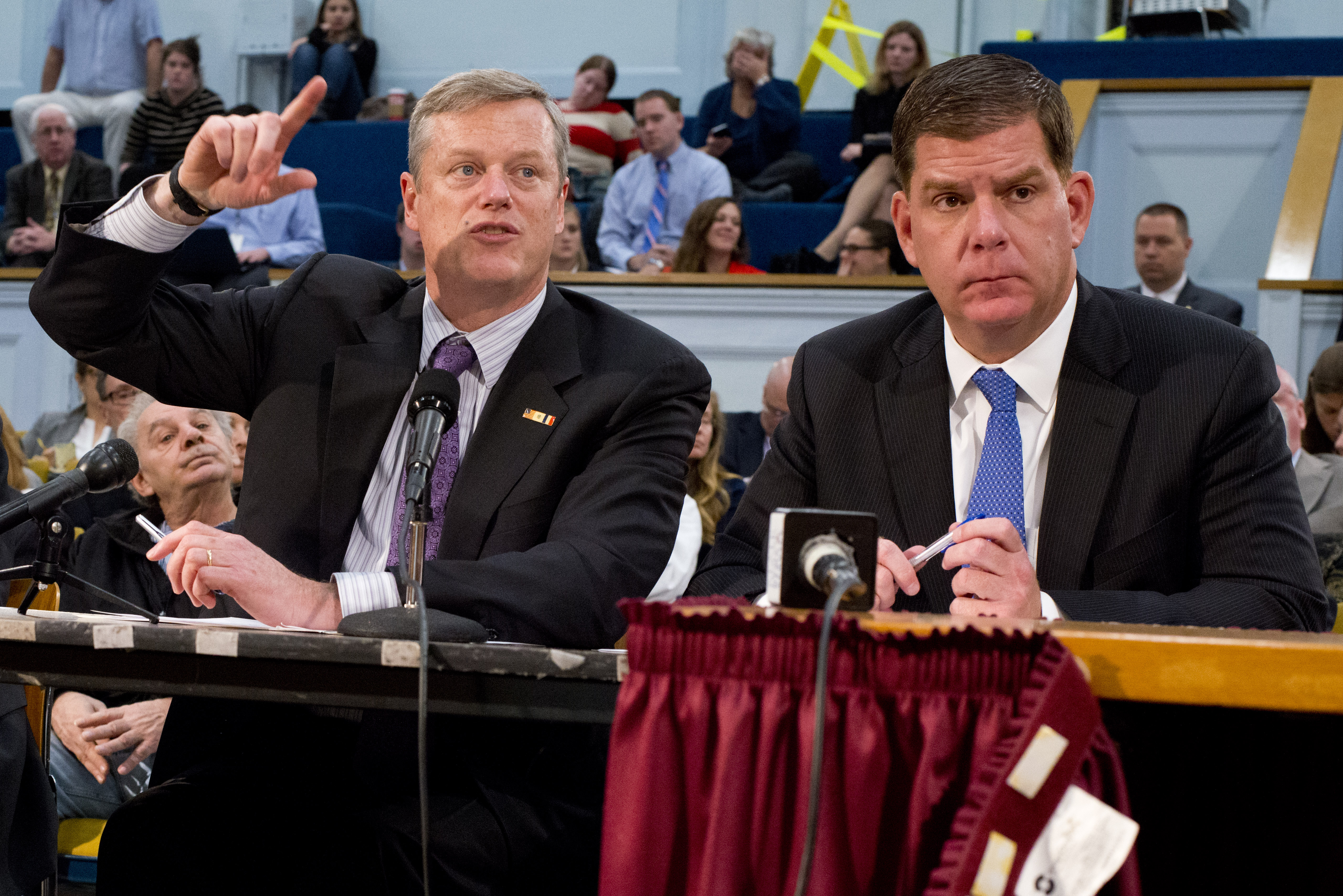
Walsh (right) and Governor Baker testifying on November 16, 2015, in support of Baker's bill to address the opioid epidemic

Walsh was a prominent opponent of the legalization of recreational cannabis in Massachusetts ahead of the vote on 2016 Massachusetts Question 4. In October 2015, Walsh joined Governor Charlie Baker in urging quick passage of Baker's bill to address the opioid epidemic. They testified together before a joint committee of the Massachusetts Legislature on November 16, 2015.

At a joint forum with Governor Baker in February 2018, Walsh expressed skepticism towards safe injection sites as a means of dealing with the impacts of the opioid epidemic, remarking, "I just don't see how that helps. I actually think you hurt the addict because now they're going to be preyed upon more by the drug dealers because they know where they are all day long." However, by early 2019, Walsh had come to support safe injection sites.

=== COVID-19 pandemic ===
Walsh was mayor during the first year of the COVID-19 pandemic. During the course of the pandemic, Walsh regularly updated the public using social media, robocalls, and text alerts.

On March 14, 2020, Walsh declared a municipal state of emergency regarding the pandemic. Under Walsh, the city put in place restrictions aimed at stymieing the spread of the COVID-19 virus. Walsh urged Bostonians to adhere to social distancing guidelines, and made efforts to limit public activity. Days after declaring a state of emergency, he suspended all construction projects and closing all of the Boston Public Library locations and city community centers. In March, the City of Boston also closed all playgrounds at its parks.

On April 5, 2020, Walsh issued an advisory that individuals leaving their place of residence to wear masks or other facial coverings. At the same time, he also announced an interim 9pm recommended curfew, and the interim closure of all recreation sports areas at city parks.

In early April, a field hospital was erected at the Boston Convention and Exhibition Center.

On March 16, 2020, Walsh announced the Boston Resiliency Fund, a city-led fundraising effort to support programs and charities serving those impacted by the pandemic. Walsh established the Boston Rental Relief Fund in April 2020, using $3 million of city funds. The fund, using city dollars, would provide aid to those at risk of losing their rental residences amid the pandemic. He later added an additional $5 million in June 2020.

Due to the pandemic, in 2020, Walsh extended the due date for property tax bills from May 1 to June 1, and waived the interest fees on delayed payments of motor vehicle and property taxes.

Walsh canceled the 2020 edition of the Boston Marathon (after having first postponed it) due to pandemic concerns.

In 2020, the city expedited licensing to allow outdoor dining for restaurants as part of a COVID-19 reopening plan. The city's outdoor dining program returned in 2021.

In October 2020, amid a rise in cases, he launched an initiative to encourage all Bostonians to take a COVID-19 tests, including providing all city employees eligible for benefits with one paid hour every other week to get tested.

During the 2020 winter holiday season, he warned Bostonians against holding holiday parties.

At the end of Walsh's tenure, Jon Keller of WBZ-TV wrote that, "Walsh's calm, empathic leadership during the pandemic has drawn high marks from city residents." Bill Forry of the Dorchester Reporter opined that Walsh had been a, "sure and steady hand during a time of unprecedented crisis."

=== Municipal truck side-guard ordinance ===
Walsh worked with Councilor Ayanna Pressley on an ordinance requiring municipal trucks to have side-guards in order to protect cyclists. It passed unanimously in the City Council in November 2014.

== Civil rights, racial matters, LGBTQ+ matters, immigrant matters ==
Under Walsh, the city of Boston took part in the My Brother's Keeper Challenge. In 2014, Walsh vetoed an ordinance by the Boston City Council to create a commission on Black men and boys, claiming that he did so because such a commission would, "duplicate and complicate efforts that my administration is already engaged in", and that the ordinance was written in such a way that he believed it would violate the city charter.

In 2014, Walsh signed the Boston Trust Act into law after it had been passed unanimously by the city council. The ordinance orders the Boston Police Department to not detain immigrants for potential deportation unless a criminal arrest warrant had been issued for them. This marked a shift away from the Secure Communities program the city up until then been a party to since 2006. Proponents of the Boston Trust Act argued that it would improve relations between immigrant communities and the local police, making immigrant communities more likely to report local crimes to police and to cooperate with police efforts. In January 2017, after newly-inaugurated president Donald Trump threatened to withdraw federal funding from cities that have sanctuary policies, Walsh reaffirmed that Boston would stand by its policy, declaring, "If people want to live here, they'll live here. They can use my office. They can use any office in this building." In 2019, Walsh signed amendments to the act into law.

In June 2020, Walsh declared racism to be a public health crisis. That month, in an effort to address institutional racism, he announced he would create an "equity and inclusion cabinet" in his administration, launch a racial equity fund, and declared his intent to pursue a new zoning amendment aimed at addressing the issue of resident displacement. The racial equity fund launched months later, with Walsh stating it would invest in nonprofits that, "empower Black and brown residents in economic development, in public health, in youth employment, in education, in the arts, and other areas."

In April 2017, Walsh announced that he would create a new Office of Women's Advancement.

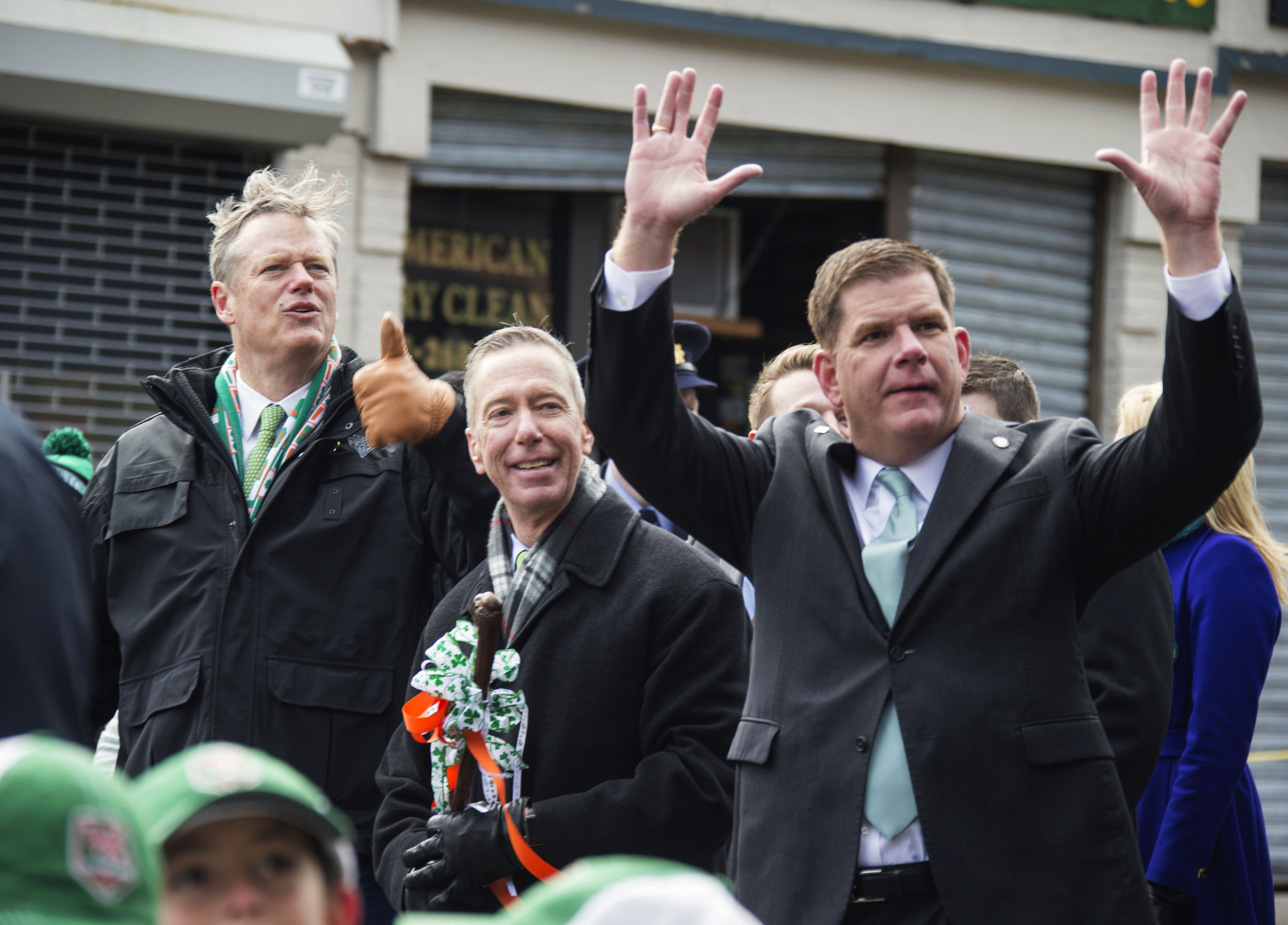
Walsh (right) walks in the 2016 South Boston St. Patrick's Day Parade alongside Governor Baker and Congressman Stephen Lynch

During his 2013 mayoral campaign, Walsh had laid-out a policy platform on support for gay rights. In 2014, Walsh refused to march in the city's Saint Patrick's Day parade due to LGBTQ groups being blocked from participating. Walsh had unsuccessfully attempted to negotiate with organizers to have them drop a two-decade prohibition on open LGBTQ displays in the parade. Walsh's predecessor, Thomas Menino, had also boycotted the parade since 1995 for this reason. After the parade organizers permitted the LGBTQ-veterans group OUTVETS to march in the 2015 parade, Walsh agreed to participate in the parade. When the parade organizers, in 2017, were planning to bar the group from again participating, Walsh and other politicians threatened not to participate in the parade. The organizers reversed course and allowed the group to participate in the parade. In May 2016, with Walsh's support, for the first time in the city's history, the transgender pride flag was flown on the Boston City Hall Plaza flagpole.

== Trade unions ==
The Boston Teachers Union had provided Walsh with an important endorsement in the 2013 election. In his 2017 re-election campaign, Walsh was endorsed by the city's patrolmen and firefighters union.

Walsh and the Boston Teachers Union were at odds late in his mayoralty over the details of his plan for re-opening the city's schools for in-person instruction after schools had been using remote learning during the early COVID pandemic. This included litigation against the city by the teachers union.

=== Collective bargaining with municipal employee unions ===
When Walsh assumed office, the city had contracts with most of its employee unions, with the exceptions of its contracts with the unions for firefighters, police superior officers, superior detectives, detectives and EMTs. Most of the existing 44 contracts were to expire in mid-2016.

In April 2014, Walsh's administration announced that it has reached contract agreement with the city's firefighters union. The contract applied retroactively to the previous three years in which the union had been without a contract, and extended a further three years. The union ratified the contract in May 2014. In November 2018, Walsh's administration reached an agreement for a new contract with the union. The union soon after ratified the agreement, which was thereafter approved by the city council in a unanimous vote.

In September 2015, the city and its police detectives union entered binding arbitration to reach a contract. In December 2015, a decision was reached in which the union received a 28.7% salary increase over six years.

In August 2017, Walsh's administration and the Boston Teachers Union reached a contract agreement following 18 months of negotiation. The contract did not settle several key points of contention between the city and the union, and expired after two years. The union and the city reached an agreement for a new contract in mid-2019.

When his elected successor, Michelle Wu, took office in November 2021, all 48 of the city's union contracts had expired.

== Shurtleff v. City of Boston ==
In 2017, Walsh and his administration refused to allow Hal Shurtleff and his Camp Constitution organization to fly what Shurtleff called the "Christian Flag" on the City Hall Plaza flagpole. The City of Boston had routinely permitted a variety of groups to fly flags on this flagpole. Walsh justified his rejection of Shurtleff's petition with a First Amendment rationale tied to the government speech doctrine and the Establishment Clause of the First Amendment, arguing that permitting the flying of this "Christian Flag" would be perceived as a city government endorsement of Christianity over other religions in violation of the Establishment Clause.

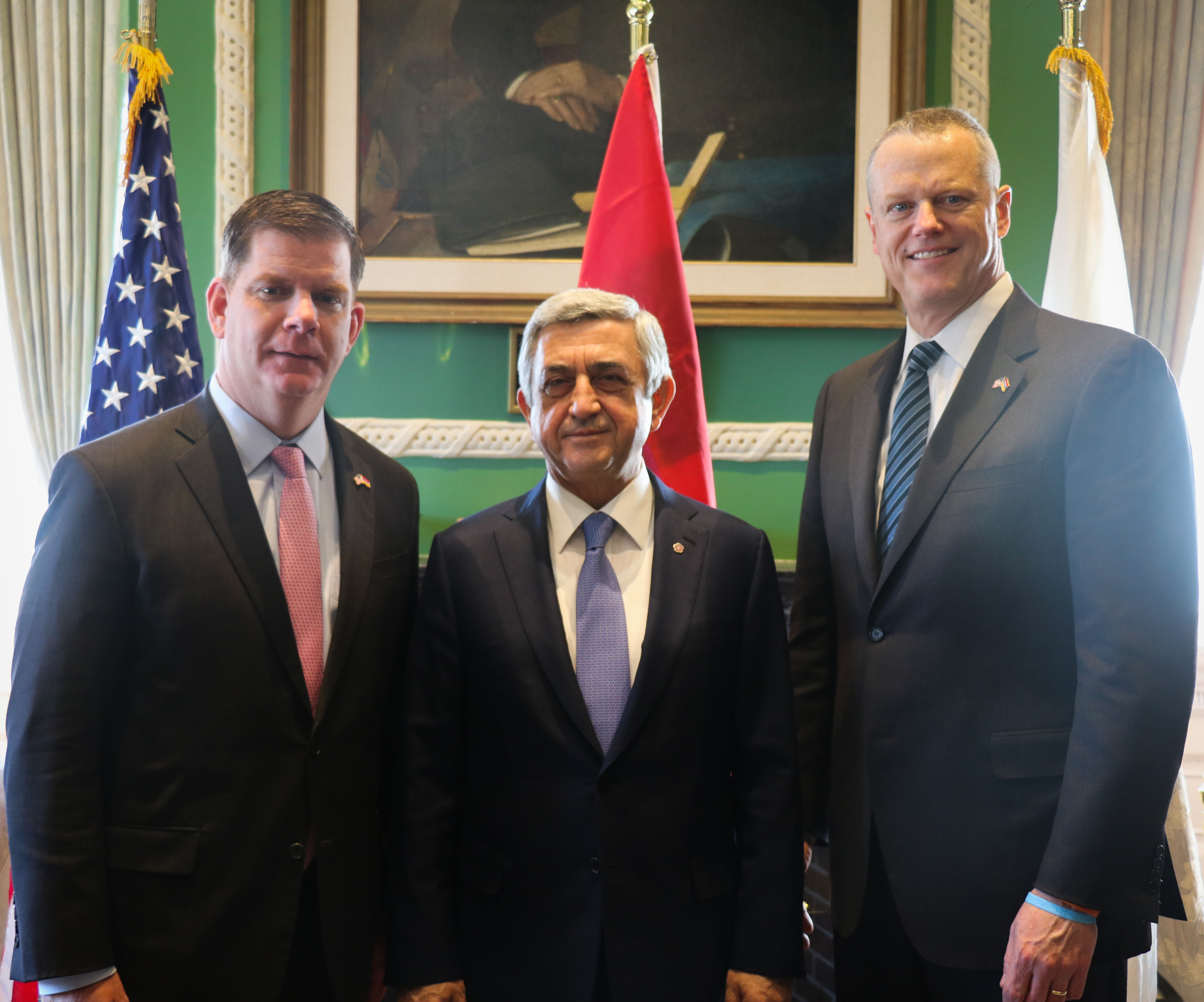
Walsh (left) and Governor Baker (right) meet with Armenian President Serzh Sargsyan in 2016

Shurtleff sued the city of Boston, alleging that the rejection of his petition amounted to a First Amendment violation. While lower courts had sided with the City of Boston, the Supreme Court of the United States ultimately sided with Shurtleff on May 22, 2022. In the unanimous Shurtleff v. City of Boston decision, the Supreme Court of the United States rejected that the matter amounted to government speech, and therefore found that the Boston city government's actions were in violation of Shurtleff's rights under the First Amendment's Free Speech Clause by performing viewpoint discrimination. To reach this ruling, the court weighed the circumstances of the situation, including what it found to be a lack of meaningful involvement by the city government in selecting flags previously flown. The City of Boston had to compensate Shurtleff $2.1 million for his legal fees.

== Federal politics ==
In November 2015, ahead of the 2016 Democratic presidential primaries, Walsh endorsed Hillary Clinton's presidential campaign. In August 2019, Walsh announced his support for Ed Markey's reelection in the 2020 U.S. Senate election in Massachusetts.

== Public image ==
As mayor, Walsh referred to himself as the city's "54th mayor", a numbering for which he cited Wikipedia's article on mayors of Boston (which had listed him as such at the time he adopted that numbering). Walsh was the central subject of the 2020 Fred Wiseman documentary film City Hall.

Walsh was regarded to have been a popular mayor, which was reflected in opinion polling. In early 2021, The Hill opinion contributor John Logan wrote,

Walsh has proven an effective communicator as Boston mayor...He has generally received high marks from the Boston labor community, and from the city’s working-class residents, for his leadership on key economic and social issues. He has enjoyed strong support from the majority of the city’s large Black community.

In 2017, Larry Donnelly of Irish Central noted,

While his ideology is undeniably left of center...there are more than a few conservative Democrats and Independents in Boston neighborhoods like his native Dorchester and South Boston who equally enthusiastically voted for Marty Walsh in 2013 and Donald Trump in 2016.

Donnelly also observed that Walsh had managed to attain popular approval among left-wing activists in Massachusetts. He described Walsh as maintaining a working-class appeal and blue-collar demeanor that made him appear, "probably more comfortable in the stands at a New England Patriots football game than at an art exhibition or swanky cocktail party."

== Departure ==
On January 7, 2021, Walsh was announced by President-elect Joe Biden to be his designated nominee for secretary of labor. By mid-February, in anticipation Walsh's confirmation, a mayoral transition was underway between Walsh and City Council President Kim Janey, since the president of the Boston City Council serves as acting mayor of Boston in the absence of a permanent mayor. By February 16, Janey had conducted around twenty briefings with key municipal staff members, including cabinet members and heads of departments. Walsh and Janey regularly communicated, and Janey attended the twice-weekly meetings that Walsh held with the leadership of his mayoral administration. Walsh resigned as mayor on March 22, 2021, the same day that he was confirmed to his position in the Cabinet of Joe Biden. Janey became acting mayor upon Walsh's resignation.

In November, Michelle Wu won election as Walsh's permanent successor. Wu had been somewhat of a political rival of Walsh's. The two were occasionally publicly at odds. She had launched her 2021 campaign for mayor at a time where it appeared Walsh would be seeking reelection. In 2024, David Bernstein of Boston magazine wrote, "Wu's reform agenda is implicitly–and sometimes openly–a repudiation of Walsh's tenure." Wu had won a landslide victory over Annissa Essaibi George in the nonpartisan general election. Essaibi George was regarded as being far more aligned with Walsh, having been a longtime friend and political ally of his.

== See also ==
- Other Boston mayoralties:
  - Mayoralty of Raymond Flynn
  - Mayoralty of Thomas Menino
  - Mayoralty of Michelle Wu

Political offices
Preceded by Thomas Menino (tenure)	Mayor of Boston, Massachusetts; January 6, 2015 – March 22, 2021	Succeeded by Michelle Wu (tenure); Kim Janey –acting successor
