= Massachusetts (Scud Mountain Boys album) =

Studio album by Scud Mountain Boys
- Released: April 1996
- Recorded: Studio .45, Hartford, Connecticut
- Genre: Indie rock, Alternative country
- Length: 54:21
- Label: Sub Pop
- Producer: Mike Deming, Thom Monahan, Scud Mountain Boys

Scud Mountain Boys chronology
Dance the Night Away (1995)	Massachusetts (1996)	Do You Love the Sun (2013)

Professional ratings
Review scores
Source	Rating
AllMusic	4.5/5 stars
Robert Christgau	(dud)
The Encyclopedia of Popular Music	4/5 stars
Entertainment Weekly	A−
Los Angeles Times	3/4 stars

Massachusetts is the third studio album by American alternative country group Scud Mountain Boys. Released in 1996 on Sub Pop, Massachusetts was recorded and mixed at Studio .45 in Hartford, Connecticut, except for the track "Grudge ****", which was recorded on a four track at home.

== Critical reception ==
The Encyclopedia of Popular Music called the album an "excellent alternative country epic." Entertainment Weekly wrote: "With songs of drunken regret and clear-eyed desperation that are closer to John Cheever than George Jones, the album’s slyly beautiful melodies and parched entreaties have the bracing chill of a Nor’east wind." Spin called it an "all-depression alt-country gem." Trouser Press deemed it "an atmospheric marvel — fully arranged, languidly delivered and occasionally branded by artful lead-guitar electricity."

== Track listing ==
All tracks are written by Joe Pernice, except where noted

No.	Title	Writer(s)	Length
1.	"In a Ditch"		2:42
2.	"Scratch Ticket"		3:44
3.	"Penthouse in the Woods"		2:42
4.	"Grudge ****"		5:03
5.	"Big Hole"		4:00
6.	"Van Drunk"		4:38
7.	"Lift Me Up"		4:30
8.	"Liquor Store"	Stephen Desaulniers	4:38
9.	"A Ride"		3:38
10.	"Holy Ghost"		4:17
11.	"Cigarette Sandwich"		2:58
12.	"Massachusetts"		3:14
13.	"Glass Jaw"		4:15
14.	"Knievel"		4:02
Total length:			54:21

== Personnel ==
- Mike Deming - Engineer, Mastering, Organ, Producer
- Stephen Desaulniers - Bass, Bass (Acoustic), Composer, Guitar, Guitar (Acoustic), Guitar (Electric), Guitar (Rhythm), Piano, Producer, Vocals, Vocals (Background)
- Thom Monahan - Drums, Engineer, Overdubs, Producer
- Bob Pernice - Guitar
- Joe Pernice - Composer, Guitar (Acoustic), Guitar (Electric), Producer, Vocals
- Paul Rocha - Piano
- Tom Shea - Drums, Guitar (Electric), Mandolin, Producer
- Bruce Tull - Guitar (Electric), Pedal Steel, Photography, Producer
- Steve Wytas - Mastering
