= The Brilliant Mistakes =

American rock band

- Origin: New York City
- Genres: Rock
- Years active: 1994–present
- Website: thebrilliantmistakes.com

The Brilliant Mistakes is an American rock band based in New York City known for their eclectic mix of pop, rock, folk and soul styles. The group was formed in 1994 by singer-songwriters Alan Walker, a New Yorker, and Erik Philbrook, a transplant from Bangor, Maine, who met while working together at Penguin Books in Manhattan. The band’s moniker comes from a song on Elvis Costello’s King of America album. Other original members of the group included drummer Mickey Wood and guitarist Andy Resnick. Drummer Paul Mauceri replaced Wood in 2000. The group also alternated guitarists, including Cameron Greider, John Putnam, Greg Beshers and Keith Tasker, to record and perform. The Brilliant Mistakes have self-released three full-length studio albums and one EP.

== Inspiration ==
The Brilliant Mistakes have been inspired by a wide variety of artists and styles, including early Elvis Costello and the Attractions, Squeeze, and Crowded House, as well as classic groups like the Beatles, the Byrds, the Beach Boys, the Kinks, and Big Star. Initially considered strictly a power-pop band, The Brilliant Mistakes sound has evolved into a more roots-oriented blend of classic American folk, R&B, and rock styles, with more modern experimental flourishes exemplified by such groups as Wilco, The Jayhawks, the Pernice Brothers, and My Morning Jacket.

== Discography ==
=== Albums ===
- All Hands and the Cook (1999, Aunt Mimi's)
- Dumb Luck (2003, Aunt Mimi's)
- Distant Drumming (2008, Aunt Mimi's)

=== EPs ===
- Lost Luggage EP (1994)

=== Compilation appearances ===
- Lowe Profile: A Tribute to Nick Lowe (2005, Brewery) (song: "Everyone")

== Current members ==
- Erik Philbrook
- Alan Walker
- Paul Mauceri

== Former and sometime members ==
- Mickey Wood
- Andy Resnick
- Greg Beshers
- John Putnam
- Cameron Greider
- Keith Tasker
