= Yours, Mine and Ours =

Yours, Mine and Ours may refer to:

- Yours, Mine and Ours (1968 film), a film starring Lucille Ball and Henry Fonda
- A 1992 episode of Full House from season five
- Yours, Mine & Ours (album), a 2003 album by the Pernice Brothers
- Yours, Mine & Ours (2005 film), a remake of the above film starring Dennis Quaid and Rene Russo
- A 2009 episode of Private Practice from season two
