= The Donkeys (band) =

American band

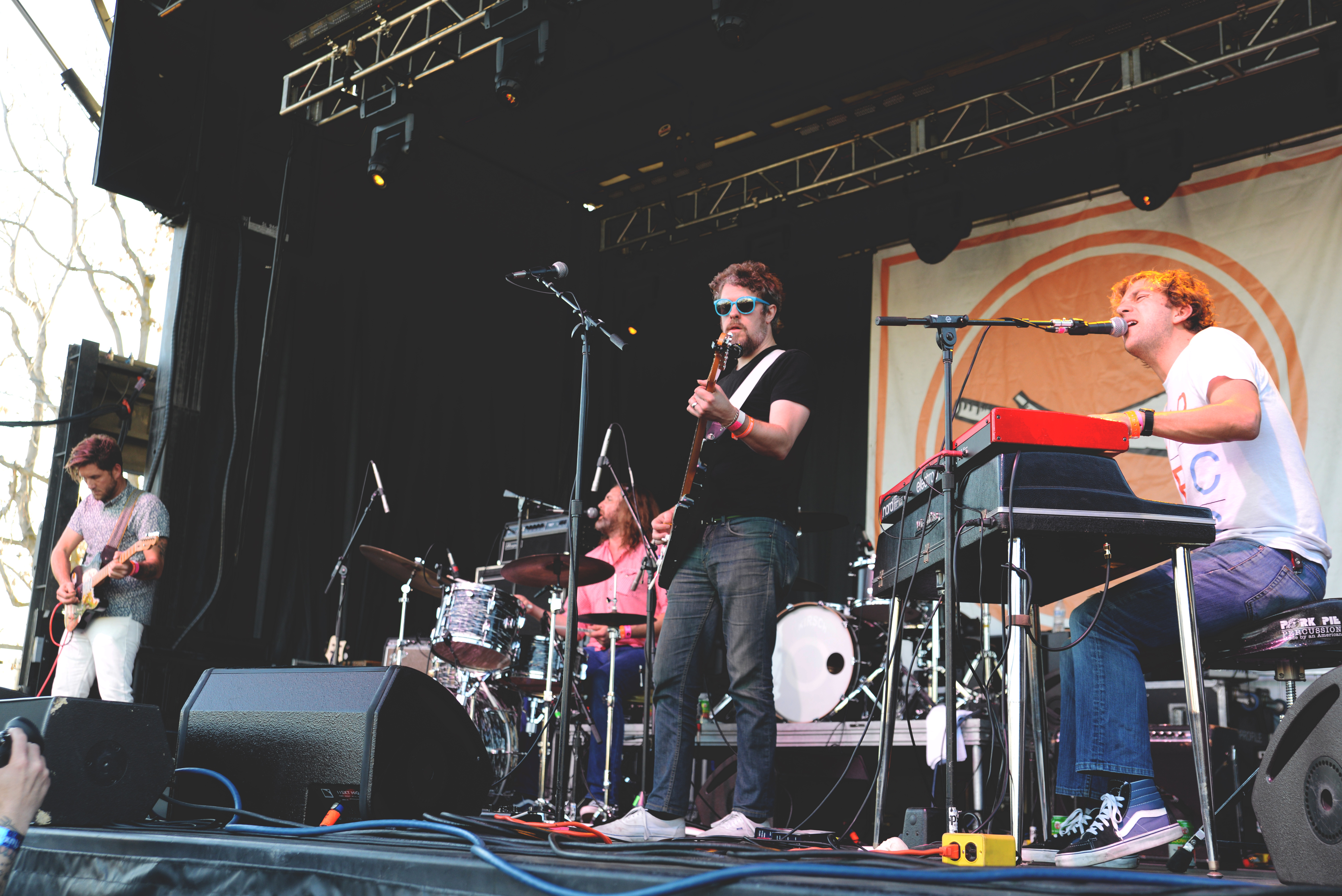
- The Donkeys at Treefort Music Fest in 2015

Background information
- Origin: San Diego, California, United States
- Genres: Indie Rock
- Years active: 2004- Present
- Labels: Dead Oceans; Easy Sound
- Members: Timothy DeNardo, Anthony Lukens, Sam Sprague
- Past members: Jesse Gulati
- Website: www.donkeysongs.com

The Donkeys are an American indie band from San Diego, California, United States, that consist of Timothy DeNardo, Jessie Gulati, Anthony Lukens, and Sam Sprague.

== History ==
Their style of music has been compared Pavement, the Grateful Dead, and Crosby, Stills, Nash & Young. They are signed to the label Dead Oceans. The band were nominated for best rock band for the San Diego Music Awards in 2011 and 2012, and won the award in 2012. Their song "Excelsior Lady" was featured as a song by the fictional band Geronimo Jackson on the TV show Lost. The Donkeys third album Born with Stripes was mixed by Thom Monahan of the Pernice Brothers and released in April 2011.

In 2016, the band released a mini album called Midnight Palms and recorded a cover of the theme to the movie Endless Summer.

== Discography ==
=== Albums ===
- The Donkeys (2004)
- Living on the Other Side (2008)
- Born with Stripes (2011)
- Ride the Black Wave (2014)
- Sun Damaged Youth (2018)
