= Into the Lime =

Studio album by The New Mendicants
- Released: 28 January 2014
- Genre: Indie pop, pop rock
- Length: 31:49
- Label: XPT Records
- Producer: Norman Blake, Joe Pernice, Mike Belitsky

The New Mendicants chronology
Australia 2013 EP (2013)	Into the Lime (2014)

Into the Lime is the first full-length album by indie pop band The New Mendicants. It was released in 2014.

Professional ratings
Aggregate scores
Source	Rating
Metacritic	76/100
Review scores
Source	Rating
Allmusic	4/5 stars
The Guardian	3/5 stars
PopMatters	7/10

== Track listing ==
All tracks written by Joe Pernice, Norman Blake and Mike Belitsky except *Sandy Denny.

1. Sarasota
2. A Very Sorry Christmas
3. Cruel Annette
4. Follow You Down
5. Shouting Match
6. If You Only Knew Her
7. High on the Skyline
8. By the Time It Gets Dark*
9. Out of the Lime
10. Lifelike Hair
