= Discover a Lovelier You =

Studio album by Pernice Brothers
- Released: June 14, 2005
- Genre: Indie rock
- Length: 40:01
- Label: Ashmont
- Producer: Joe Pernice

Pernice Brothers chronology
Nobody's Watching/Nobody's Listening (2003)	Discover a Lovelier You (2005)	Live a Little (2006)

Professional ratings
Aggregate scores
Source	Rating
Metacritic	78/100
Review scores
Source	Rating
AllMusic	4/5 stars
Entertainment Weekly	B
Pitchfork	5.8/10
Rolling Stone	3/5 stars
Spin	B+
Uncut	4/5 stars
The Village Voice	A−

Discover a Lovelier You is the fourth studio album by American indie rock band Pernice Brothers, released on June 14, 2005, by Ashmont Records.

== Track listing ==
All tracks are written by Joe Pernice, except where noted.

No.	Title	Writer(s)	Length
1.	"There Goes the Sun"		3:36
2.	"Saddest Quo"		3:32
3.	"Snow"		3:09
4.	"Sell Your Hair"		3:16
5.	"My So-Called Celibate Life"		3:36
6.	"Dumb It Down"	Thom Monahan; Pernice	2:23
7.	"Discover a Lovelier You" (instrumental)		3:54
8.	"Say Goodnight to the Lady"		2:41
9.	"Amazing Glow"		3:05
10.	"Subject Drop" (guest vocals by Blake Hazard)		2:47
11.	"Pisshole in the Snow"		3:17
12.	"Red Desert"		4:19
13.	"Amazing Glimmer"		0:26
