= Jale (band) =

Canadian alternative rock band

- Origin: Halifax, Nova Scotia, Canada
- Genres: Grunge, alternative rock, indie rock, indie pop
- Years active: 1992–1996
- Labels: Sub Pop, Cinnamon Toast
- Past members: Jennifer Pierce; Alyson MacLeod; Laura Stein; Eve Hartling; Mike Belitsky

Jale was a Canadian alternative rock band from Halifax, Nova Scotia, Canada. Contemporaries of Sloan and The Super Friendz, they formed in 1992 and was part of the Halifax Pop Explosion scene in the 1990s. They released three records as a band (the albums Dreamcake and So Wound and the EP Closed) before disbanding in 1996.

== Career ==
Jale was formed by four art school students in 1992. The guitarist Jennifer Pierce had earlier sung backing vocals on the album Smeared by Sloan. The other founders were Alyson MacLeod (drums), Laura Stein (bass guitar) and Eve Hartling (guitar). The band's name was formed from the first letters of the members' first names.

Jale was one of the first two Canadian bands (with Eric's Trip) to be signed to Seattle record label Sub Pop, at a time when the music industry turned their attention to the East Coast following the success of Seattle's grunge music. Their debut album, Dreamcake, was released by Sub Pop in 1994. Two music videos were made, "Promise (Jimmybeam Majestic Version)", directed by Tyran George, and "Not Happy".

In the summer of 1995, the band released the Closed EP on local label Murderecords. Music videos were released for the songs "Double Edge", and "Jesus Loves Me". The EP would be the last record featuring drummer Alyson MacLeod, who left Jale to join The Hardship Post. Mike Belitsky of the alt-country band The Sadies replaced MacLeod as drummer.

In November 1995, Jale regrouped to record their second and final album, So Wound, in Chicago. The band released a music video for the single "All Ready". So Wound was a consciously more power pop album than Dreamcake and received critical praise. However, Sub Pop pulled support for the album while the band was on tour. Only a few months after the release of So Wound, Jale disbanded.

== Discography ==
=== Albums and EPs ===
- Dreamcake (1994)
- Closed EP (1995)
- So Wound (1996)

=== Singles ===
- "Aunt Betty" (7", Single) (1992)
- "Gold Leather With Heel Detail" (7", Single) (1993)
- "Cut" (7", Single) (1993)
- "Sort of Grey" (7", Single) (1993)
- "14 08 93" (7", Cass/CD, Single) (1994)
- Edgefest Murder EP (7", Promo) (1994)
- "All Ready / Hey Hey" (7"/CD, Single) (1996)
- "True What You Say" (7", Single) (1997)

=== Videos ===
- "Promise" - Sub Pop Video Network Program 3 (VHS, 1995)

== Post Jale ==
Pierce, Stein and Belitsky continued as The Vees. They toured Canada twice and released an EP, The Vees, on the Halifax label Murderecords in 1997. The band stopped performing the following year. Pierce, Stein and Belitsky resurfaced in 2000 as Chappaquiddick Skyline, a side project of the Massachusetts-based Pernice Brothers, and released an album, Chappaquiddick Skyline. Stein and Belitsky later appeared on the Pernice Brothers' albums The World Won't End (2001) and Yours, Mine and Ours (2003). Stein and Pierce are also listed as vocalists on Who Will You Believe (2024).

All members of the band worked on photography and graphic design of posters, album artwork and art direction for music videos. Hartling was nominated for a Juno award in 1997 for her design of So Wound. She continued to paint, and after exhibiting her work in group shows in Halifax over several years, had her first solo show in 2005. Hartling lives and works in Halifax, Nova Scotia.

Stein went on to become a graphic designer, first in New York City, balancing design and touring as keyboardist with Pernice Brothers. She later joined Sid Lee, a creative services firm, at their Toronto office. She is now CCO at Bruce Mau Design in Toronto.

In December 2024, Pierce released a six song EP, Unsuitable, as Jenny & the Tide, on Bandcamp. Their first full length album, Rhymes with Girl, will be released October 2, 2026.
