= Dreamcake =

Studio album by Jale
- Released: 12 July 1994
- Recorded: January 10–16, 1994
- Studios: East River, NS (Brennan McGuire's Studio)
- Genre: alternative rock
- Length: 36:07
- Label: Sub Pop
- Producer: Brad Wood

Jale chronology
Dreamcake (1994)	So Wound (1996)

Dreamcake is the first album by the Halifax, Nova Scotia, band Jale. It was released in 1994 on Sub Pop Records.

The only Jale album with the singer-songwriter-drummer Alyson McLeod, the songs on Dreamcake are considered edgier and more emotional than those of Jale's later work.

The closing track, "Promise", written by Jennifer Pierce and Patrick Pentland of Sloan, and sung by Pierce, was released as a single.

== Critical reception ==
Professional ratings
Review scores
Source	Rating
AllMusic	3/5 stars
The Encyclopedia of Popular Music	4/5 stars

The Chicago Reader wrote that the album "displays a precocious craft that lifts [Jale] well above one-trick-pony status." Exclaim! called Dreamcake one of the ten best Canadian-made Sub Pop records, writing that "hypnotic Halifax pop swirls between the speakers on 'Again,' while 'Mend' threads together elements of jangling twee and paisley-print psychedelia." The Chicago Tribune wrote that "with a bit less aggression than Hole and less cutesy-ness than Shonen Knife, [Jale] incorporate just enough guitar noise to counterbalance all those delightful pop hooks."

Trouser Press wrote: "A diverse collection of contemporary electric indie-pop styles (some audibly influenced by Sloan) from a palette of appealing melodies, gentle harmony singing and buzzing guitar power, the casual-sounding record articulates the longings and frustrations of mindful young women who know when to draw the line and walk away from a bad scene."

== Track listing ==
All tracks by Jale

1. "Not Happy" – 2:54
2. "Nebulous" – 2:53
3. "3 Days" – 3:26
4. "To Be Your Friend" – 2:30
5. "Again" – 3:21
6. "River" – 3:28
7. "I'm Sorry" – 2:15
8. "Mend" – 2:10
9. "The Unseen Guest" – 2:29
10. "Love Letter" – 3:21
11. "Emma" – 2:41
12. "Promise (Jimmybeane Majestic Version)" – 4:34

== Personnel ==
- Jennifer Pierce – guitar
- Alyson MacLeod – drums
- Laura Stein – bass guitar
- Eve Hartling – guitar
