= Fading Parade =

Album by Papercuts

Studio album by Papercuts
- Released: March 1, 2011
- Genre: Indie pop
- Length: 37:42
- Label: Sub Pop
- Producer: Thom Monahan, Jason Robert Quever

Papercuts chronology
You Can Have What You Want (2009)	Fading Parade (2011)	Life Among The Savages (2014)

Professional ratings
Review scores
Source	Rating
Allmusic	4/5 stars
Drowned in Sound	(6/10)
The Guardian	3/5 stars
Pitchfork	(7.4/10)
Spin	(7/10)

Fading Parade is the fourth album from Papercuts, released in 2011 on the Sub Pop label.

== Track listing ==
All songs written and composed by Jason Robert Quever, except "Do You Really Wanna Know" composed by Quever and Donovan Quinn.

1. "Do You Really Wanna Know" – 3:14
2. "Do What You Will" – 3:41
3. "I'll See You Later, I Guess" – 4:48
4. "Chills" – 4:20
5. "The Messenger" – 3:28
6. "White Are the Waves" – 3:17
7. "Wait Till I'm Dead" – 4:11
8. "Marie Says You've Changed" – 3:27
9. "Winter Daze" – 3:19
10. "Charades" – 3:57

== Personnel ==
- Jason Robert Quever – vocals, guitar, arranger, producer
- Thom Monahan – producer, engineer, mixing
- David Enos – autoharp, keyboards
- Graham Hill – drums, arranger, sounds
- Jeff Kleinsmith – art direction, design
- Frankie Koeller – bass, arranger
- Joe Lambert – mastering
- Robert Madden – cover photo

== Reception ==
The album received generally favorable reviews from critics. Allmusic gave the album 4 out of 5 stars, describing it as being "as big and bright and misty as spring kicking in." Pitchfork gave it a 7.4 out of 10, explaining that "although everything about their surfaces could be considered soft, all of these songs boast remarkably strong bone structure." In a more mixed review, Maddy Costa of The Guardian gave the album 3 out of 5 stars, stating "but with all Quever's ambitions reserved for the interior texture of the songs, the surface can seem a touch precious and self-absorbed."
