= Parallel Universe Blues =

Studio album by Papercuts
- Released: October 19, 2018
- Length: 35:03
- Label: Slumberland

Papercuts chronology
Life Among the Savages (2014)	Parallel Universe Blues (2018)

Professional ratings
Aggregate scores
Source	Rating
Metacritic	77/100
Review scores
Source	Rating
AllMusic	4/5 stars
Exclaim!	7/10
God Is In The TV	9/10
Paste	7/10

Parallel Universe Blues is the sixth studio album by American band Papercuts. It was released in October 2018 under Slumberland Records.

== Accolades ==
Publication	Accolade	Rank	Ref.
God Is In The TV	Top 50 Albums of 2018	54	

== Track listing ==
No.	Title	Length
1.	"Mattress on the Floor"	1:58
2.	"Laughing Man"	2:57
3.	"How to Quit Smoking"	3:08
4.	"Sing to Me Candy"	5:44
5.	"Clean Living"	2:51
6.	"Kathleen Says"	3:43
7.	"Walk Backwards"	4:14
8.	"All Along St. Mary’s"	4:32
9.	"Waking Up"	2:55
10.	"Looking Through Heather"	3:01
