= Live a Little (Pernice Brothers album) =

Studio album by Pernice Brothers
- Released: 3 October 2006
- Recorded: 2006
- Genre: Indie rock
- Length: 40:40
- Label: Ashmont Records
- Producer: Michael Deming

Pernice Brothers chronology
Discover a Lovelier You (2005)	Live a Little (2006)	Goodbye, Killer (2010)

Professional ratings
Review scores
Source	Rating
AllMusic	link
The A.V. Club	link
Being There Magazine	(A−) link
Entertainment Weekly	(6.4/10) link
Pitchfork	link
PopMatters	link
Prefix Magazine	(B)

Live a Little is an album by Pernice Brothers, released in 2006.

== Track listing ==
All tracks are written by Joe Pernice.

No.	Title	Length
1.	"Automaton"	3:06
2.	"Somerville"	3:34
3.	"Cruelty to Animals"	3:21
4.	"Zero Refills"	4:49
5.	"Microscopic View"	3:17
6.	"How Can I Compare"	2:49
7.	"B.S. Johnson"	2:22
8.	"PCH One"	3:34
9.	"Conscience Clean (I Went to Spain)"	2:51
10.	"Lightheaded"	2:52
11.	"High as a Kite"	3:13
12.	"Grudge F*** (2006)"	4:56

In the booklet for the CD, the song High As A Kite, there are several references to The Clash, "heavy downbeat of one and the show began/london calling, strike up the contraband/" and "we wore pictures of Strummer/fell over ourselves all summer", more than likely referring to Joe Strummer.

On this CD, Joe Pernice's brother Bob plays electric guitar on several songs: they are "Automaton", "Zero Refills", "PCH One", "Lightheaded" and "High As A Kite". Bob is an occasional fixture in the band, though he does not play with them all the time.
