= Goodbye, Killer =

Album by Pernice Brothers

Studio album by Pernice Brothers
- Released: 15 July 2010
- Genre: Indie rock
- Length: 32:05
- Label: Ashmont Records
- Producer: Joe Pernice

Pernice Brothers chronology
Live a Little (2006)	Goodbye, Killer (2010)	Spread the Feeling (2019)

Professional ratings
Aggregate scores
Source	Rating
Metacritic	(71/100)
Review scores
Source	Rating
AllMusic	4/5 stars
The Boston Globe	(favorable)
The Independent	(favorable)
Irish Independent	3/5 stars
Pitchfork	(5.8/10)

Goodbye Killer is a Pernice Brothers album, released in 2010.

== Track listing ==
1. "Bechamel" – 2:25
2. "Jacqueline Susann" – 2:18
3. "We Love the Stage" – 3:25
4. "The Loving Kind" – 3:28
5. "Something for You" – 4:01
6. "Goodbye Killer" – 3:58
7. "The Great Depression" – 2:57
8. "Newport News" – 3:35
9. "Fucking and Flowers" – 2:40
10. "The End of Faith" – 3:23
