= The World Won't End =

Studio album by Pernice Brothers
- Released: June 19, 2001
- Recorded: October 2000
- Genre: Indie rock
- Length: 40:05
- Label: Ashmont
- Producers: Thom Monahan; Joe Pernice

Pernice Brothers chronology
Overcome by Happiness (1998)	The World Won't End (2001)	Yours, Mine & Ours (2003)

Professional ratings
Review scores
Source	Rating
AllMusic	4.5/5 stars
Alternative Press	8/10
Entertainment Weekly	A−
The Guardian	4/5 stars
NME	8/10
Pitchfork	7.2/10
Q	4/5 stars
The Rolling Stone Album Guide	4/5 stars
Spin	8/10
The Village Voice	B+

The World Won't End is the second studio album by American indie rock band Pernice Brothers. It was released by Ashmont Records on June 19, 2001. It peaked at number 26 on the UK Independent Albums Chart.

== Track listing ==
All tracks are written by Joe Pernice.

No.	Title	Length
1.	"Working Girls (Sunlight Shines)"	3:20
2.	"7:30"	3:03
3.	"Our Time Has Passed"	3:53
4.	"She Heightened Everything"	2:38
5.	"Bryte Side"	3:11
6.	"Let That Show"	3:44
7.	"Shaken Baby"	4:06
8.	"Flaming Wreck"	5:34
9.	"The Ballad of Bjorn Borg"	3:38
10.	"Endless Supply"	3:51
11.	"Cronulla Breakdown"	3:07

Japanese edition bonus tracks
No.	Title	Length
12.	"Up The Down Escalator"	3:59
13.	"Our Time Has Passed (4 Track Version)"	4:25

== Personnel ==
Credits adapted from liner notes.

Pernice Brothers

- Joe Pernice – vocals, guitar, bass guitar
- Thom Monahan – vocals, guitar, bass guitar, keyboards, drum programming
- Mike Belitsky – drums, percussion
- Laura Stein – vocals, piano, keyboards
- Peyton Pinkerton – vocals, guitar, percussion
- Bob Pernice – vocals, guitar

Additional musicians

- Jeremy Smith – percussion
- Mike Daly – guitar, pedal steel guitar, baritone guitar, mandocello
- Jeffrey Underhill – guitar
- Joe Harvard – guitar
- Ann Viebig – vocals
- Jane Scarpantoni – cello
- Antoine Silverman – violin
- Lorenza Ponce – violin
- David Gold – viola

Technical personnel

- Thom Monahan – production, recording, engineering, mixing
- Joe Pernice – production
- Joe Harvard – additional engineering
- José Ayerve – additional engineering
- Mark Allan Miller – mixing
- Jeff Lipton – mastering
- David Trenholm – string arrangement
- Laura Stein – design
- Adam Woolfit – cover photography
- Norm Demoura – band photography

== Charts ==
Chart (2001)	Peak position
UK Independent Albums (Official Charts)	26
