= Affirmatively Furthering Fair Housing =

Provision of the 1968 federal Fair Housing Act

Affirmatively Furthering Fair Housing (AFFH) is a provision of the 1968 federal Fair Housing Act signed into law by President Lyndon B. Johnson. The law requires that "All executive departments and agencies shall administer their programs and activities relating to housing and urban development (including any Federal agency having regulatory or supervisory authority over financial institutions) in a manner affirmatively to further the purposes of" the Fair Housing Act. The law also requires the Secretary of the United States Department of Housing and Urban Development (HUD) to administer all HUD programs in a manner that affirmatively furthers fair housing.

Since the Fair Housing Act has a dual purpose — the elimination of both housing discrimination and residentially segregated communities — affirmatively furthering fair housing is essentially fulfilling the dual purpose of the law, proponents said. There is a significant link between appropriate housing, community involvement and health. According to the World Health Organization’s 2018 Housing and Health Guidelines, improved housing conditions can save lives, prevent disease, increase quality of life, reduce poverty, and help mitigate climate change.

== 2015 changes ==
Under the Obama Administration, in July 2015 HUD promulgated the Affirmatively Furthering Fair Housing Rule pursuant to the Fair Housing Act. It requires cities and towns that receive Federal money for any housing or urban development related purpose to examine whether there are any barriers to fair housing, housing patterns or practices that promote bias based on any protected class under the Fair Housing Act, and to create a plan for rectifying fair housing barriers. The intention is to promote equal housing opportunities and level the playing field so that all neighborhoods provide the quality services and amenities that are important for people to live successful lives. Civil rights groups hailed the rule citing decades-long patterns of government-sponsored segregation and discriminatory practices, while conservatives decried it as social engineering.

The 2015 rules required cities and towns, in order to receive funding from HUD to document patterns of racial bias in their neighborhoods, to publicly report the results every three to five years, and to set and track goals to reduce segregation. Under the new rules, any jurisdiction that receives money from HUD must analyze its housing occupancy by race, disability, familial status, economic status, English proficiency, and other categories. It must then analyze factors which contribute to any prohibitive barriers in housing and formulate a plan to remedy the impediments.

The plan can be approved or disapproved by HUD. This is done at both the local and regional level. For example, a major city, such as Chicago, will have to analyze any racial disparities within Chicago, and Chicago suburbs will analyze their own racial disparities. In addition, Chicago and the suburbs will have to analyze any disparities as compared with each other. Thereafter, the community has to track progress (or lack thereof). The planning cycle will be repeated every five years. If the Federal government is not satisfied with a community's efforts to reduce disparities, federal funds could be withheld.

== 2020 changes ==
In a tweet posted on July 23, 2020, President Trump said, "I am happy to inform all of the people living in their Suburban Lifestyle Dream that you will no longer be bothered or financially hurt by having low income housing built in your neighborhood. Your housing prices will go up based on the market, and crime will go down. I have rescinded the Obama-Biden AFFH Rule. ENJOY!" In a second tweet addressed to “The Suburban Housewives of America,” Trump continued, “Biden will destroy your neighborhood and your American Dream. I will preserve it, and make it even better!”

In a press release made the previous week HUD Secretary Ben Carson said that implementation of the Obama legislation had proven “to be complicated, costly, and ineffective” saying:

"After reviewing thousands of comments on the proposed changes to the Affirmatively Furthering Fair Housing (AFFH) regulation, we found it to be unworkable and ultimately a waste of time for localities to comply with, too often resulting in funds being steered away from communities that need them most… Washington has no business dictating what is best to meet your local community’s unique needs.

The administration is replacing the AFFH with the Preserving Community and Neighborhood Choice rule, which Carson said will offer state and local government the benefit of the doubt to maintain fair housing practices. “This brand-new rule…defines fair housing broadly to mean housing that, among other attributes, is affordable, safe, decent, free of unlawful discrimination, and accessible under civil rights laws. It then defines ‘affirmatively furthering fair housing’ to mean any action rationally related to promoting any of the above attributes of fair housing,” the HUD secretary’s statement read.

== 2021 changes ==
Shortly after taking office in January 2021, President Joe Biden took steps to reverse the Trump reversal of Affirmatively Furthering Fair Housing, designed to introduce subsidized housing into higher-income, suburban zip codes. The order directed the secretary of Housing and Urban Development to “examine the effects” of the Trump rules.

=== Commentary ===
In a statement Speaker of the House Nancy Pelosi said, "The Trump Administration’s elimination of the fair housing rule is a betrayal of our nation’s founding values of equality and opportunity for all. It is a shameful abdication of our government’s responsibility to end discriminatory housing practices and to lift up our nation’s most vulnerable communities."

Eugene Robinson commented that Trump's tweet "may be the most nakedly racist appeal to White voters that I’ve seen since the days of segregationist state leaders such as Alabama’s George Wallace and Georgia’s Lester Maddox." Noting that the Trump family had been sued by the Justice Department in 1973 for refusing to rent apartments to African Americans, Robinson said, "Trump’s tweet is a promise not to actively enforce [the Obama Administration's] provision. And it’s a message to White people they can go ahead and do whatever they feel is necessary to keep Black people and Latinos from moving into their neighborhoods."

Discussing the Trump decision to end the Fair Housing Rule, NPR writes that the likely reason for his move was that suburban voters, and particularly white suburban women voters, are valuable swing voters seen as necessary for Trump to win the 2020 election. NPR quotes political scientist Lynn Vavreck, who explains the rhetoric of his policy decision: "[Trump suggests] a suburb is the kind of community where great Americans live because we've limited it. I think it's just straight-up racializing this idea of housing. This is the kind of argument that Trump makes all the time: 'I'm going to tell you that these people are good, or us versus them. We, the good people, and they, the bad people. And we have to keep them out to keep our greatness.'"

== 2025 changes ==
In 2025, HUD proposed a rule that "returns to the original understanding of what the statutory AFFH certification was prior to 1994".

== State and local actions ==
Some municipal governments have adopted policies modeled after the federal policy. Boston became the largest city government to do so. Policies aimed at mimicking parts of the federal policy had been put in place in January 2021 when Boston Mayor Marty Walsh signed into effect changes to the city's zoning code that had been unanimously approved by the Boston Zoning Commission. In 2022, Boston Mayor Michelle Wu signed the Executive Order Relative to Affirmatively Furthering Fair Housing municipal executive order. That order, unlike the more controversial provisions of the federal law, is not designed to introduce subsidized housing into local areas without community involvement. It directs the Boston Planning and Development Agency (BPDA) to recommend zoning code changes to improve the efficiency of development review and approval. The order mandates community engagement is reviews, but does exempt projects sited on land owned by the BPDA and previously approved without community engagement from further review.
