= So Wound =

Studio album by Jale
- Released: 4 July 1996
- Recorded: November 1995
- Studio: Idful, Chicago, Illinois
- Genre: Alternative rock
- Label: Sub Pop
- Producer: Brad Wood

Jale chronology
Dreamcake (1994)	So Wound (1996)

Professional ratings
Review scores
Source	Rating
AllMusic	4.5/5 stars
Pitchfork	7.3/10

So Wound is the second (and last) album by the Halifax (Nova Scotia) rock band Jale, released in 1996 on Sub Pop Records. A consciously more power-pop album than its predecessor, Dreamcake, So Wound received critical praise but failed to make significant radio impact.

Shortly after the release of So Wound, the band split up.

== Critical reception ==
Ira Robbins, in Trouser Press, wrote: "Appreciably elevating the band’s skill and confidence levels from indie pop cuteness to real contention (while upholding the lyrical fortitude), the album is a taut, purposeful marvel of great pop songs in a number of cohesively connected modes."

== Track listing ==
1. "Ali"
2. "Hey Hey"
3. "Sign of Life"
4. "All Ready"
5. "Tumble"
6. "Blue"
7. "Mosquito"
8. "Storm"
9. "Drag"
10. "Back on Track"
11. "Over You"
12. "Despite"
13. "Superstar"

== Hidden track ==
Approximately fifteen seconds after the end of "Superstar" there is an unlisted track, informally known as "Sentimental."
