= Joyce Linehan =

American record label manager

Joyce Linehan worked as Chief of Policy for then-Mayor of Boston Marty Walsh. She previously managed rock bands and a record label. She was born and lives in Dorchester, Massachusetts.

== Education ==
Joyce Linehan is the daughter of John J. Linehan and Yvonne Linehan. As a Dorchester native, Linehan graduated from the Notre Dame Academy and the University of Massachusetts Boston where she received her bachelor's degree in Media and American Popular Culture and a Masters in American Studies. She received the Dr. Robert W. Spayne Research Grant for study at the Country Music Hall of Fame. Her master's thesis — The Day My Mama Socked it to the Harper Valley PTA: Country Music Womanhood in the Second Wave of Feminism — received the American Studies Book Award from UMass Boston.

== Career ==
=== Band manager ===
Linehan first worked in Boston's underground rock scene, booking bands into small local clubs. Eventually this led her to becoming a manager. She managed the Smithereens, Six Finger Satellite, and the Lemonheads.

=== Record labels ===
In the 1990s, Linehan took a job as promotions director and talent scout at Sub Pop, a Seattle label that was later acquired by Warner Brothers and launched the grunge band Nirvana into mainstream stardom. Linehan's Dorchester home served as the East Coast offices of Sub Pop.

When Linehan left Sub Pop, she became the manager of the Pernice Brothers. Linehan and Joe Pernice later decided to create their own label, called Ashmont Records. Their label released numerous records including Yours, Mine and Ours, by the Pernice Brothers, released in 2003. The two also co-wrote the book Pernice to Me: a chronicle of disagreements between Linehan and Pernice, most of which has appeared on Twitter.

She owned a house on Burt Street in Dorchester, Massachusetts, which the Phoenix once called the "most famous and best-loved rock-and-roll crash pad in Boston history." Bikini Kill, Smashing Pumpkins, Elliott Smith, The Jesus Lizard, and Stereolab all stayed there over the years.

=== Public relations and arts ===
Linehan was the president of Ashmont Media, a public relations company that specializes in the development of media campaigns for arts and culture groups in the Boston area, and was the spokesperson for First Night Boston.

Some of her clients included ArtsEmerson, Fruitlands Museum, Handel and Haydn Society and the Institute of Contemporary Art, Boston. She is also the founder of the Dorchester Arts Collaborative.

=== Political campaigns ===
In 2000 Linehan began to engage in politics in addition to the arts. She helped out in many campaigns including John Kerry's 2004 Presidential Election and Elizabeth Warren's run for U.S Senate in 2012. Linehan took part in all campaigns as a volunteer until she took the job as Chief of Policy in 2014 for Mayor Walsh. She volunteered with Marty Walsh's mayoral campaign before being appointed as his Chief of Policy.

=== Other ===
Linehan is an animal advocate and leader in the fight to end breed-specific legislation; and serves on the board of Interim House, a residential substance abuse treatment center.

== Awards ==
In 2012, she received an Unsung Heroine of Massachusetts award from the Massachusetts Commission of the Status of Women. She has also been honored by The Irish Echo for her commitment to working people, and by Company One for her commitment to theater. She is a lifelong resident of Dorchester.
