= Yours, Mine & Ours (album) =

Studio album by Pernice Brothers
- Released: May 20, 2003
- Genre: Indie rock
- Length: 36:43
- Label: Ashmont
- Producers: Thom Monahan; Joe Pernice

Pernice Brothers chronology
The World Won't End (2001)	Yours, Mine & Ours (2003)	Australia Tour EP 2002 (2003)

Professional ratings
Aggregate scores
Source	Rating
Metacritic	88/100
Review scores
Source	Rating
AllMusic	4/5 stars
Blender	4/5 stars
The Boston Phoenix	3/4 stars
Entertainment Weekly	B+
Mojo	4/5 stars
Pitchfork	7.9/10
Rolling Stone	3/5 stars
Uncut	4/5 stars

Yours, Mine & Ours is the third studio album by American indie rock band Pernice Brothers. It was released by Ashmont Records on May 20, 2003. It peaked at number 34 on the UK Independent Albums Chart. In 2009, Sherwin-Williams used "The Weakest Shade of Blue" in its ad campaign.

== Track listing ==
All tracks are written by Joe Pernice, except as noted.

No.	Title	Writer(s)	Length
1.	"The Weakest Shade of Blue"		3:08
2.	"Water Ban"		3:08
3.	"One Foot in the Grave"	Thom Monahan; Pernice	3:15
4.	"Baby in Two"		3:36
5.	"Blinded by the Stars"		4:56
6.	"Waiting for the Universe"		3:33
7.	"Judy"		3:30
8.	"Sometimes I Remember"		2:45
9.	"How to Live Alone"		3:43
10.	"Number Two"		5:39

== Personnel ==
Credits adapted from liner notes.

Musicians

- Joe Pernice – performance
- Thom Monahan – performance
- Peyton Pinkerton – performance
- Mike Belitsky – performance
- Laura Stein – performance
- Bob Pernice – performance
- Mike Daly – additional performance
- Ben Wheelock – additional performance
- John Crooke – additional performance
- Warren Zanes – additional performance
- April March – additional performance

Technical personnel

- Thom Monahan – production, recording, mixing
- Joe Pernice – production
- Ken Heitmuller – mixing
- Jeff Lipton – mastering
- Kenyon King – technical support
- Marc Moorash – technical support
- Laura Stein – package design
- Pernice Brothers – band photography

== Charts ==
Chart (2003)	Peak position
UK Independent Albums (Official Charts)	34
US Heatseekers Albums (Billboard)	45
US Independent Albums (Billboard)	38
