= Papercuts (band) =

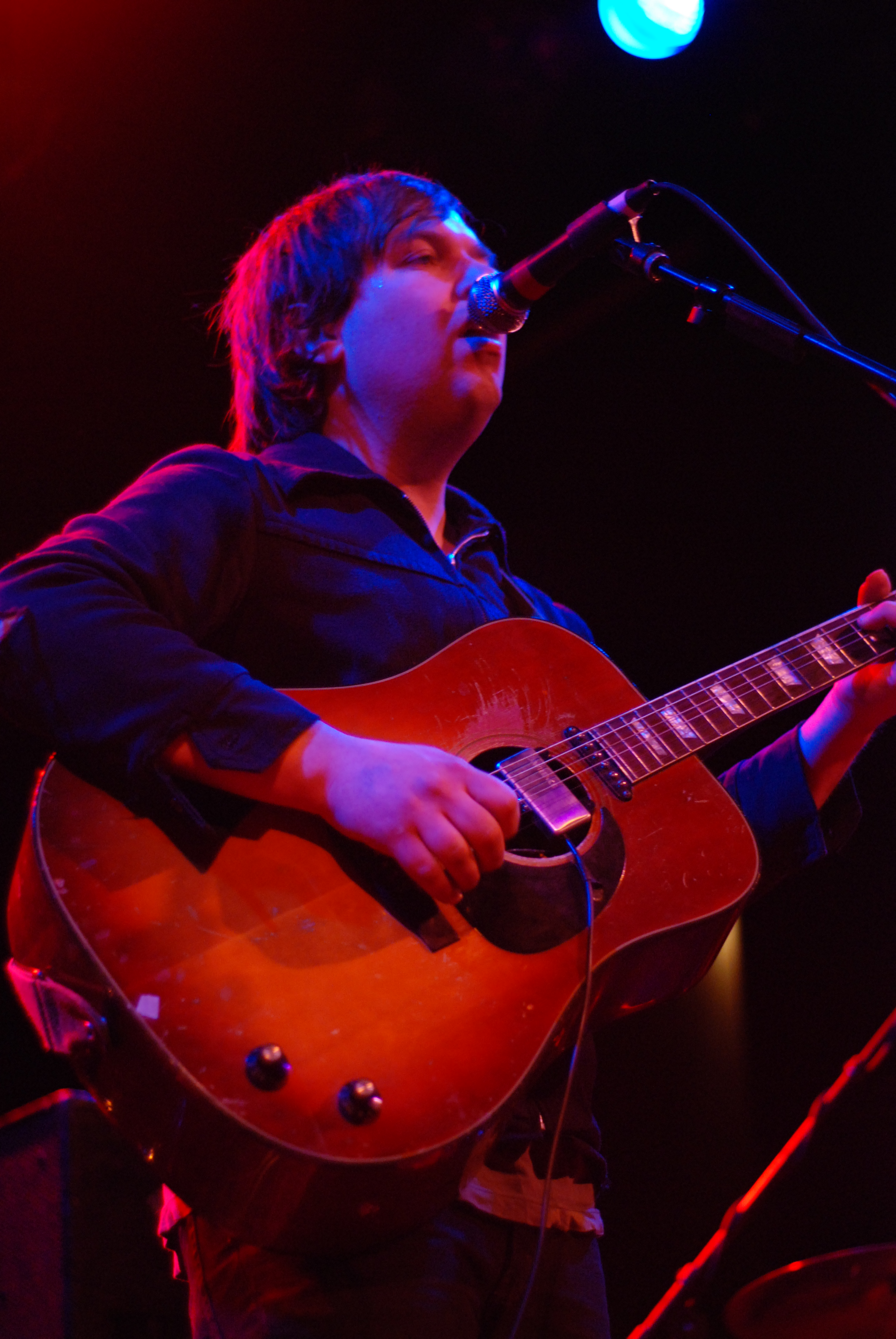
- Papercuts performing at Bowery in 2007

Background information
- Origin: San Francisco, California, United States
- Genres: Indie pop
- Years active: 2004–present
- Labels: Slumberland Records, Sub Pop, Memphis Industries, Gnomonsong

Papercuts is an American indie pop project centered on San Francisco songwriter/producer Jason Robert Quever.

== History ==
Papercuts is the musical project of California singer-songwriter and producer Jason Robert Quever, and various guest musicians. Quever was born and raised in Humboldt, California, spending a number of his early years in a commune, then moving to the Bay Area at the age of 10. Both his parents died in his teen years. After moving to San Francisco and studying at San Francisco State University, Quever started Papercuts as a solo project, releasing his first proper album, Mockingbird, in 2004. In 2007 came the critically acclaimed Can't Go Back, followed by 2009's You Can Have What You Want, both on Gnomonsong. 2011's Fading Parade was released by Sub Pop, which was followed by a period where Quever focused on producing. He currently runs a recording studio in downtown Los Angeles. Quever is also known for producing Cass McCombs's early work, as well as recordings by Dean Wareham (Galaxie 500) and Beach House. A sixth Papercuts album, Parallel Universe Blues on Oakland's Slumberland Records, was released on October 19, 2018.

Papercuts covered Don Henley's "Boys of Summer" for the American Laundromat Records charity CD Sing Me To Sleep - Indie Lullabies. The CD was released worldwide on May 18, 2010.

The bands that Papercuts have toured with include Grizzly Bear, Beach House, Camera Obscura, Still Corners and Vetiver.

== Personnel ==
Quever is the only permanent member of Papercuts, early on playing with whoever of his friends were available. Bay area artist/filmmaker David Enos and Matt Popieluch have been the longest-standing collaborators.

== Musical style ==
The Papercuts sound is generally classified as indie pop, with comparisons also being made to dream pop, shoegaze, and '60s pop.

In a 2007 live review in The New York Times, Jon Pareles described the band: "Melding sustained organ chords with slow fingerpicked guitar, the Papercuts’ music merged Velvet Underground ballads with touches of the Byrds, while Jason Quever sang in a high, diffident voice about elusive love." A PopMatters review described Papercuts as "a marching band on Quaaludes" and "part atmospheric, part dream pop rock, always melodic, and never boring". A Houston Press review of Can't Go Back described the album as having a "warm, sunny sound, recalling northern California circa 1968", going on to describe the band as "a lo-fi version of The Byrds".

== Discography ==
=== Albums ===
- 2000 - Rejoicing Songs (cassingleUSA)
- 2004 - Mockingbird (Antenna Farm)
- 2007 - Can't Go Back (Gnomonsong)
- 2009 - You Can Have What You Want (Gnomonsong)
- 2011 - Fading Parade (Sub Pop)
- 2014 - Life Among the Savages (Easy Sound Recording Co./Memphis Industries)
- 2018 - Parallel Universe Blues (Slumberland Records)
- 2022 - Past Life Regression (Slumberland Records)

=== Singles ===
- 2009 - "Future Primitive" (Gnomonsong)
- 2009 - "A Dictator's Lament" (Gnomonsong)
- 2009 - "The Machine Will Tell Us So" (Gnomonsong)
- 2011 - "Do What You Will" (Sub Pop)
- 2011 - "Do You Really Wanna" (Sub Pop)
