= Overcome by Happiness =

Studio album by Pernice Brothers
- Released: May 19, 1998
- Genre: Indie rock
- Length: 36:02
- Label: Sub Pop
- Producer: Michael Deming

Pernice Brothers chronology
Overcome by Happiness (1998)	The World Won't End (2001)

Professional ratings
Review scores
Source	Rating
AllMusic	4.5/5 stars
Christgau's Consumer Guide	(2-star Honorable Mention)
Entertainment Weekly	A−
NME	8/10
(The New) Rolling Stone Album Guide	4/5 stars

Overcome by Happiness is the debut studio album by American indie rock band Pernice Brothers, released on May 19, 1998 by Sub Pop.

== Track listing ==
All tracks are written by Joe Pernice.

No.	Title	Length
1.	"Crestfallen"	3:53
2.	"Overcome by Happiness"	3:40
3.	"Sick of You"	1:23
4.	"Clear Spot"	2:21
5.	"Dimmest Star"	3:48
6.	"Monkey Suit"	3:01
7.	"Chicken Wire"	4:05
8.	"Wait to Stop"	3:29
9.	"All I Know"	2:51
10.	"Shoes and Clothes"	2:47
11.	"Wherein Obscurely"	3:02
12.	"Ferris Wheel"	4:40
