= Mike Belitsky =

Canadian musician

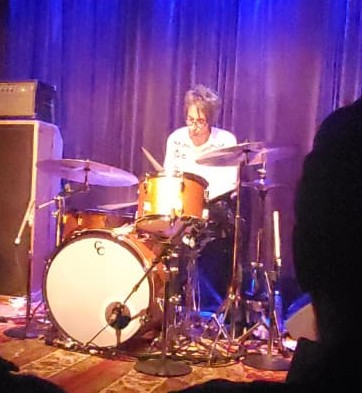
- Belitsky with the Sadies in 2025

Background information
- Born: Michael Jonathon Belitsky; January 19, 1966 (age 60); Boston, Massachusetts
- Genres: Indie rock, country
- Instrument: Drums
- Years active: 1980s–present
- Labels: Blue Fog, Sonic Unyon

Michael Jonathon Belitsky is a Canadian musician. He has played drums for a number of bands, including Jellyfishbabies, Jale, Neko Case, and Pernice Brothers, and later The Sadies.

== Early life ==
Belitsky was born in Boston, Massachusetts and grew up in Halifax, Nova Scotia. He attended Concordia University in Montreal.

== Career ==
Belitsky left Concordia in 1987 to join the band Jellyfishbabies, who relocated to Toronto. He later moved to Halifax, drumming in punk bands. In 1996, he became a member of the band Jale, and drummed on their second album, So Wound. A year later he performed at the New York Pop Explosion festival with the band Cheticamp.

In the late '90s, Belitsky joined Toronto band the Sadies. By 2004, he was playing with the band Unintended as well as the Sadies. In 2013, he joined the band The New Mendicants. He toured Spain with the group in 2014, and drummed on their 2014 album Into the Lime.

In 2018, Belitsky injured his shoulder while ice skating, and was unable to perform for several months. Since that time he has continued to play in The Sadies and The New Mendicants.

Following the Sadies' lead singer Dallas Good's death in 2022, Belitsky suffered a torn ligament in his wrist, providing a further setback for the band. After Belitsky healed from wrist surgery, the Sadies rallied and continue to tour and record to this day.

== Album appearances ==
- Neko Case - Fox Confessor Brings the Flood (2006, Anti-)
