= Joe Pernice =

American indie rock musician and writer (born 1967)

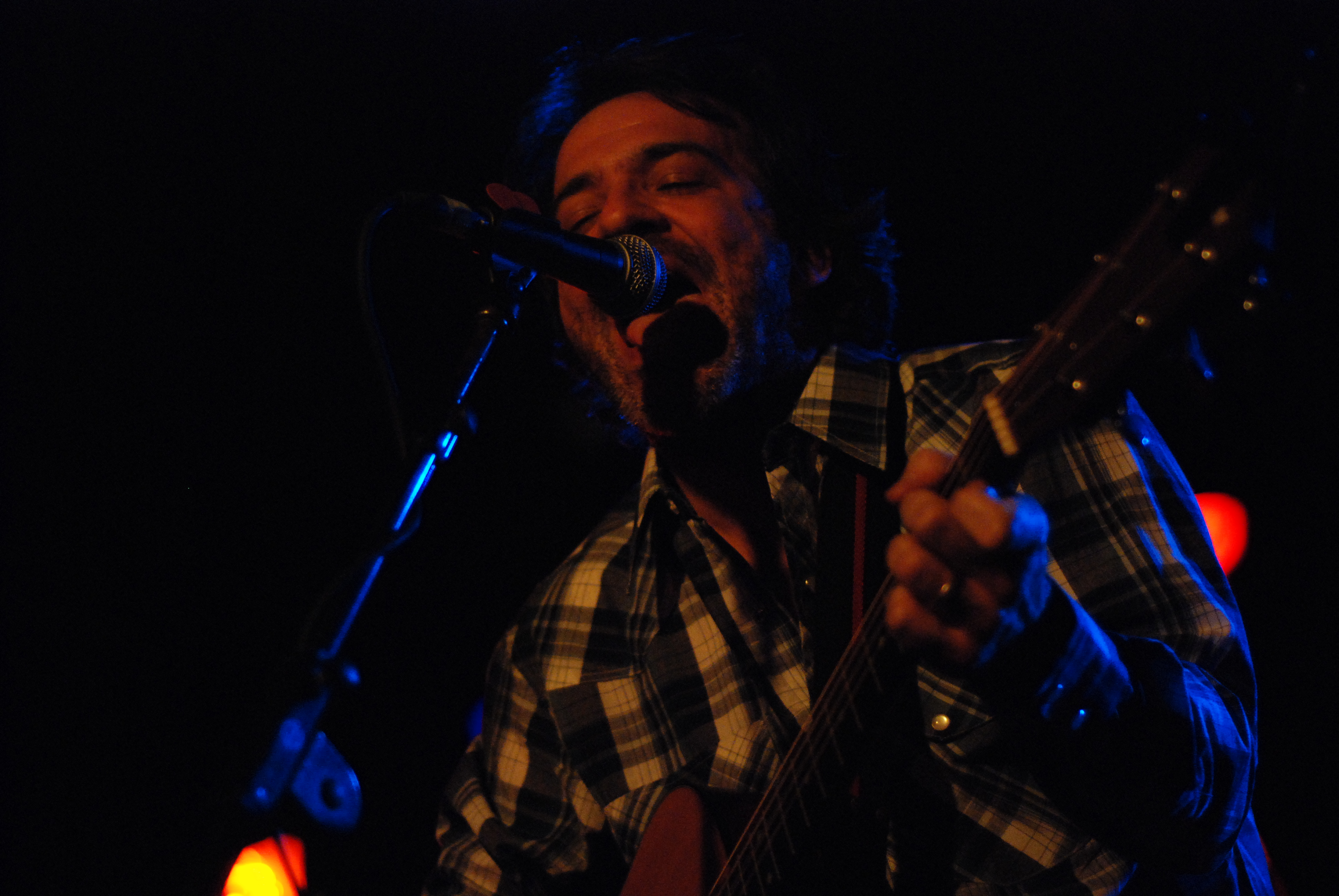
- Joe Pernice playing with the Pernice Brothers, 2006

Background information
- Born: July 17, 1967 (age 59); Boston, Massachusetts
- Genres: Indie rock, alternative pop, chamber pop, alternative country
- Years active: 1991–present
- Labels: Sub Pop, Ashmont
- Website: joepernice.bandcamp.com

Joseph T. Pernice (born July 17, 1967) is an American indie rock musician and writer, who has fronted several bands, including the Scud Mountain Boys, Chappaquiddick Skyline, The New Mendicants and the Pernice Brothers.

== Early life ==
Pernice was born into a large Italian American family in Boston, Massachusetts, in 1967. He was raised in the south shore town of Holbrook and attended Catholic school. His father managed a trucking dealership, while his mother worked at home, taking care of six children.

Pernice received his undergraduate degree in English at the University of Massachusetts Amherst. After taking a year off, he was encouraged by poet James Tate to return to Amherst, where he completed a three-year MFA in creative writing.

== Music career ==
Pernice formed the Scud Mountain Boys in 1992, in Northampton, Massachusetts. The Scud Mountain Boys released three albums before disbanding in 1997. Pine Box (1995), Dance The Night Away (1995) and Massachusetts (1996).

After the break-up, Pernice formed the Pernice Brothers. The band released their first album Overcome by Happiness in 1998 for Sub Pop. The band released The World Won't End in 2001 on Pernice's own label, Ashmont Records and Yours, Mine & Ours in 2003. After a 2004 tour, the band released their first live album in early 2005, Nobody's Watching/Nobody's Listening, and, in June of the same year, released their fourth studio album, Discover a Lovelier You. The band released Live a Little, their fifth studio album, in October 2006. Also in 2006, Pernice appeared as himself in an episode of the WB television show Gilmore Girls.

In 2007, he co-produced the Transnormal Skiperoo album for Jim White. In 2009, Pernice released a solo album called It Feels So Good When I Stop, which was an album of cover songs, marketed as a soundtrack for his debut novel of the same name. In June 2010, the band released its first album in four years, Goodbye, Killer.

During the 1999-2000 hiatus of the Pernice Brothers, Pernice recorded under his own name, issuing the album Big Tobacco, and as Chappaquiddick Skyline, who issued their sole self-titled album on the Sub Pop label. Chappaquiddick Skyline was made up of Pernice Brothers band members playing songs written by Pernice, which he joked were not worthy of the Pernice Brothers banner. He has also released a single "Pega Luna Manny" along with Jose Ayerve, a member of the Pernice Brothers, a song about Boston Red Sox player Manny Ramirez which enjoyed moderate success when the Boston Red Sox won the world series that year, for the first time in 86 years.

In 2012 The Scud Mountain Boys reunited after a 15 years hiatus. They released their fourth album, Do You Love the Sun, in 2014.

Pernice has collaborated with Norman Blake and Mike Belitsky in The New Mendicants. A New Mendicants album Into The Lime was released in 2014. He also formed Roger Lion along with musician and hip hop producer Budo. The duo released a studio album, Roger Lion, on Team Love Records in 2015.

On September 9, 2019, Pernice released Spread the Feeling, the sixth studio LP by the Pernice Brothers.

== Writing career ==
In 2001, Pernice published a collection of poetry called Two Blind Pigeons. The majority of that book consists of Pernice's MFA thesis.

In 2003, as a part of Continuum Publishing's 33 1/3 series of short books about some of rock music's most important and influential albums, Pernice issued Meat Is Murder, a novella about suicide and an almost unhealthy obsession with the Smiths' 1985 album of the same name.

In 2009, Pernice published his first novel, It Feels So Good When I Stop, via the Penguin Books imprint Riverhead Books. The book features a narrator "hiding from the wreckage of a one-day marriage by holing up in Cape Cod with his soon to be ex-brother in law."

Pernice is also intermittently working on a screenplay for Meat is Murder with actor Neal Huff.

Along with the release of his latest CD, Goodbye, Killer, Ashmont Records published a limited-edition collection of Twitter tweets between Pernice and his label co-owner Joyce Linehan. These tweets currently are serving as the basis for an ongoing series of short, humorous videos featuring puppets of Pernice, Linehan and some other characters. The videos can be seen on pernicebrothers.com.

In 2017, Pernice was a staff writer on the Canadian television show The Detail. Pernice co-wrote episode 6 with Canadian writer Adam Pettle.

== Personal life ==
Pernice is currently based in Toronto, Ontario, Canada, where he is married to Canadian musician Laura Stein, formerly of the band Jale.

== Discography ==
=== Solo ===
- Big Tobacco (2000)
- Richard (2020)
- Could It Be Magic (2020)
