= Scud Mountain Boys =

American alternative country band

- Origin: Northampton, Massachusetts
- Genres: Country rock, alternative country
- Years active: 1991–1997; 2012–present
- Labels: Chunk, Sub Pop, Ashmont
- Members: Joe Pernice; Stephen Desaulniers; Bruce Tull; Tom Shea

Scud Mountain Boys are an American country rock band. Formed in 1991 in Northampton, Massachusetts, it comprised Joe Pernice, Stephen Desaulniers, Bruce Tull and Tom Shea. Stephen Desaulniers left the band and was replaced by Frank Padellaro in October 1996.

The band at first was known as the Scuds, and their early work was influenced by electric rock. However, they sat round Tull's kitchen table every night and played acoustic country tunes, and soon decided that they enjoyed this style more. This culminated in the Scud Mountain Boys bringing the table to a concert and playing while sitting down, a move which was enthusiastically welcomed.

The band released three albums before disbanding in 1997: Dance the Night Away (1995), Pine Box (1995) and Massachusetts (1996). Massachusetts was their debut on the Sub Pop label, and upon signing they negotiated for the re-release of their first two albums. The Early Year was released in 1997 and contained slightly reordered versions of Dance the Night Away and Pine Box on two CDs.

Pernice, Shea and Desaulniers reunited for an impromptu performance in Cambridge in August 2011. The band announced plans for a full reunion of the original lineup in January 2012 and social networking sites confirmed involvement of Pernice, Desaulniers, Tull and Shea for the shows.

The band's fourth album, Do You Love the Sun was released in 2013 featuring all original members (Pernice, Desaulniers, Tull and Shea) with Padellaro as producer and recording engineer. The Early Year compilation was also re-released the same year on One Little Indian Records.

Pernice, the group's main songwriter, later went on to form the more pop/rock-influenced band Pernice Brothers.

Lead guitarist Bruce Tull died after a brief illness at his home in Tulsa on June 22, 2026, at the age of 71.

== Discography ==
=== Albums ===
- Dance the Night Away (1995)
- Pine Box (1995)
- Massachusetts (1996)
- Do You Love the Sun (2013)

=== Compilations ===
- The Early Year (1997)
