= Pernice Brothers =

American indie rock band

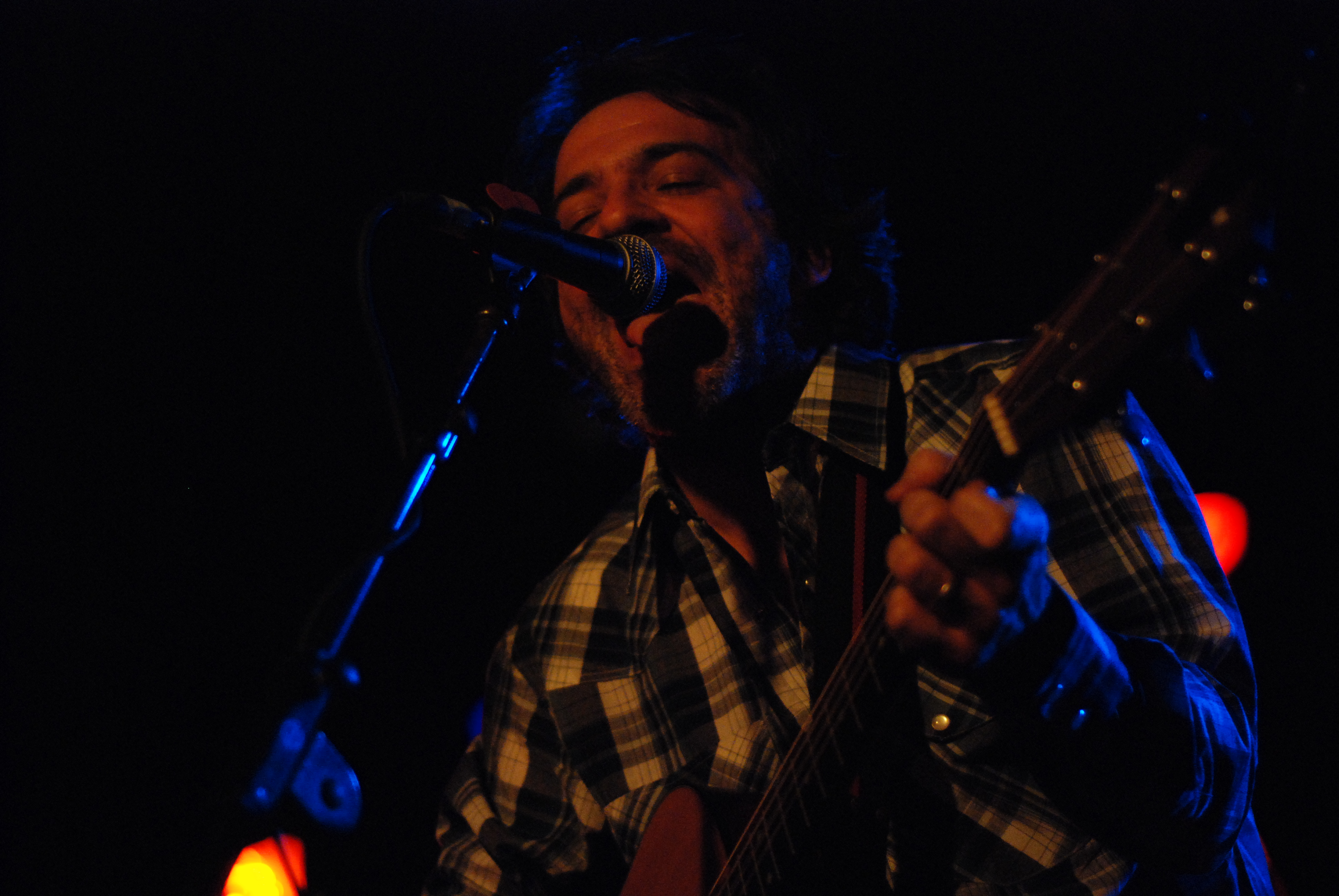
- Joe Pernice performing with the Pernice Brothers, 2006

Background information
- Origin: Dorchester, Boston, Massachusetts, United States
- Genres: Indie rock
- Years active: 1998–present
- Labels: Sub Pop, Ashmont
- Members: Joe Pernice; Thom Monahan; James Walbourne; Patrick Berkery; Peyton Pinkerton; Laura Stein; José Ayerve; Michael Deming; Bob Pernice; Ric Menck
- Past members: Mike Belitsky; Aaron Sperske

Pernice Brothers are an American indie rock band. Formed by Joe Pernice in 1998 after the breakup of his old band, the Scud Mountain Boys, and including Joe's brother Bob Pernice, the band recorded their first album, Overcome by Happiness, for Sub Pop in 1998. After a three-year hiatus (during which Joe Pernice recorded under his own name and as Chappaquiddick Skyline), Pernice Brothers returned in 2001 with The World Won't End; after parting with Sub Pop, the album was released on Pernice's own label, Ashmont Records, co-owned with his long-time manager Joyce Linehan, which in 2003 released Yours, Mine and Ours. After a 2004 tour, the band released their first live album in early 2005, Nobody's Watching/Nobody's Listening, and, in June of the same year, released their fourth studio album, Discover a Lovelier You. The band released Live a Little, their fifth studio album, in October 2006. Goodbye, Killer was released in June 2010, after which the band did not release another album until 2019's Spread the Feeling. The band's songs are characterized by lilting melodies and intelligent lyrics.

== Discography ==
Albums

- Overcome by Happiness (Sub Pop; CD; 1998)
- The World Won't End (Ashmont Records; CD; 2001)
- Yours, Mine and Ours (Ashmont Records; CD; 2003)
- Nobody's Watching/Nobody's Listening; Ashmont Records; live; CD/DVD; 2005)
- Discover a Lovelier You (Ashmont Records; CD; 2005)
- Live a Little (Ashmont Records; CD; 2006)
- Goodbye, Killer (Ashmont Records; CD; 2010)
- Spread the Feeling (Ashmont Records; 2019)
- Who Will You Believe (Ashmont Records; 2024)

EPs

- Australia Tour EP 2002 (Ashmont Records; live; EP; 2002)

== Reception ==
In May 2007, the Pernice Brothers' song "Chicken Wire," from their 1998 debut album Overcome by Happiness, was named the No. 1 Most Exquisitely Sad Song in the Whole World by AOL Music. The song describes a suicide attempt.
