= Singles, Live, Unreleased =

Box set by Royal Trux
- Released: November 4, 1997
- Recorded: May 1988 – January 1994
- Genre: Rock
- Length: 117:40
- Label: Drag City; Domino

Royal Trux chronology
Sweet Sixteen (1997)	Singles, Live, Unreleased (1997)	Accelerator (1998)

Professional ratings
Review scores
Source	Rating
AllMusic	4/5 stars
Entertainment Weekly	A-
NME	8/10

Singles, Live, Unreleased is a compilation album by Royal Trux. It was released in 1997 by Drag City as a triple LP box set and a double CD.

== Track listing ==
All songs written by Neil Hagerty and Jennifer Herrema, except where noted

=== Side one ===
1. "Esso Dame" – 1:51
2. "Mercury" – 3:50
3. "No Fixed Address" – 3:29
4. "Red Tiger" – 5:12
5. "Lucy Peaupaux" – 3:44

=== Side two ===
1. "June Night Afternoon" – 3:54
2. "Steal Your Face" – 3:10
3. "Back to School" – 4:12
4. "Faca Amolada" (Ronaldo Bastos, Milton Nascimento) – 4:39
5. "Luminous Dolphin" – 3:16
6. "Spike Cyclone" – 3:59

=== Side three ===
1. "Vile Child" – 3:44
2. "Law Man" (Grace Slick) – 2:53
3. "Shockwave Rider" (Mike Fellows, Hagerty, Herrema) – 3:59
4. "Chairman Blow" – 7:02
5. "Womban" (Larry Kessler) – 3:49

=== Side four ===
1. "Cut You Loose" – 2:58
2. "Baghdad Buzz" – 4:08
3. "Hero/Zero" – 2:28
4. "Statik Jakl" – 4:03
5. "Gett Off" – 2:41
6. "Teeth" – 4:21

=== Side five ===
1. "Cleveland" – 4:00
2. "Theme from M*A*S*H" (Johnny Mandel, Mike Altman) – 2:11
3. "Strawberry Soda" – 1:50
4. "Sunflavor" – 3:08
5. "Love Is..." – 3:00

=== Side six ===
1. "Ratcreeps" – 4:47
2. "Hair Beach" – 3:42
3. "Sometimes" – 1:33
4. "Signed, Confused" (Hagerty, Herrema, Rian Murphy) – 5:56
5. "Aviator Blues" – 4:11
