= Thank You (Royal Trux album) =

Studio album by Royal Trux
- Released: 1995
- Genre: Rock
- Length: 39:10
- Label: Charisma/Virgin (CD); Drag City (LP)
- Producer: David Briggs

Royal Trux chronology
Cats and Dogs (1993)	Thank You (1995)	Sweet Sixteen (1997)

Professional ratings
Review scores
Source	Rating
AllMusic	4.5/5 stars
Billboard	favorable
Entertainment Weekly	B
Rolling Stone	3.5/5 stars
Spin	8/10

Thank You is the fifth studio album by Royal Trux. It was released in 1995.

== Track listing ==
All tracks are written by Neil Hagerty and Jennifer Herrema, except where noted.

No.	Title	Writer(s)	Length
1.	"A Night to Remember"		2:32
2.	"The Sewers of Mars"		3:30
3.	"Ray O Vac"		4:04
4.	"Map of the City"		3:57
5.	"Granny Grunt"	Hagerty, Herrema, David Berman	3:52
6.	"Lights on the Levee"		4:28
7.	"Fear Strikes Out"		3:31
8.	"(Have You Met) Horror James?"	Hagerty, Herrema, Berman	3:54
9.	"You're Gonna Lose"		2:44
10.	"Shadow of the Wasp"	Hagerty, Herrema, Rian Murphy	6:38
