= 3-Song EP (Royal Trux EP) =

EP by Royal Trux
- Released: August 27, 1998
- Recorded: April 22, 1998
- Genre: Rock
- Length: 13:02
- Label: Drag City; Domino

Royal Trux chronology
Accelerator (1998)	3-Song EP (1998)	Veterans of Disorder (1999)

Professional ratings
Review scores
Source	Rating
Allmusic	3/5 stars
Pitchfork	(8.0/10)

3-Song EP is a twelve-inch EP by Royal Trux. It was released by Drag City in 1998.

== Track listing ==
No.	Title	Writer(s)	Length
1.	"Deafer Than Blind"	Neil Hagerty, Jennifer Herrema	2:43
2.	"The United States vs One 1974 Cadillac El Dorado Sedan"	Hagerty, Herrema, Rian Murphy, David Pajo, Jon Theodore	7:23
3.	"Run, Shaker Life"	Traditional; arranged by Royal Trux	2:56
