= Untitled Royal Trux album =

Untitled

Studio album by Royal Trux
- Released: 1992
- Studios: The Station, Rockville, Maryland
- Genre: Noise rock
- Length: 32:17
- Labels: Drag City; Domino
- Producer: Royal Trux

Royal Trux chronology
Twin Infinitives (1990)	Untitled (1992)	Cats and Dogs (1993)

The untitled third album by Royal Trux was released in 1992 by Drag City.

== Critical reception ==
Professional ratings
Review scores
Source	Rating
AllMusic	3/5 stars
NME	7/10
Q	3/5 stars
Uncut	7/10 stars

The Chicago Tribune noted that parts of the album combine "acoustic guitars with an early, low-rent Sonic Youth vibe."

== Track listing ==
All tracks are written by Neil Hagerty and Jennifer Herrema, except "Sometimes" co-written by Gene Thomasson.

No.	Title	Length
1.	"Air"	3:25
2.	"Move"	3:59
3.	"Hallucination"	3:29
4.	"Junkie Nurse"	4:09
5.	"Sometimes"	2:11
6.	"Lightning Boxer"	5:58
7.	"Blood Flowers"	3:58
8.	"Sun on the Run"	5:08

== Personnel ==
Royal Trux

- Neil Hagerty – vocals, guitar, keyboards
- Jennifer Herrema – vocals, keyboards

Production and additional personnel

- Richard – engineering
- Trip – engineering
- Royal Trux – production
