= Veterans of Disorder =

Studio album by Royal Trux
- Released: September 7, 1999
- Recorded: August 1998 – March 1999
- Studio: Sound of Music, Richmond, Virginia; Stillness, Warrenton, Virginia; Thunder Run, Castleton, Virginia
- Genre: Rock
- Length: 39:15
- Label: Drag City

Royal Trux chronology
3-Song EP (1998)	Veterans of Disorder (1999)	Radio Video (2000)

Veterans of Disorder is a studio album by the American band Royal Trux. It was released in 1999 by Drag City.

== Critical reception ==
Professional ratings
Review scores
Source	Rating
AllMusic	4.5/5 stars
Alternative Press	5/5 stars
The Guardian	4/5 stars
Pitchfork	6.9/10
Q	3/5 stars
The Wire	favorable

The Washington Post wrote that the album "starts with straightforward rockers like the ones the band recorded for its two Virgin albums ... But after the Latin-influenced '!Yo Se!', the music veers in the looser, jazzier direction of the band's earlier work." NME named it the 27th best album of 1999.

Record Collector called Veterans of Disorder "by no means a classic album but, as a statement against conformity, convention and expectation, it still packs a powerful punch."

== Track listing ==
All tracks are written by Neil Hagerty and Jennifer Herrema.

No.	Title	Length
1.	"Waterpark"	2:14
2.	"Stop"	2:46
3.	"The Exception"	2:19
4.	"Second Skin"	2:46
5.	"Witch's Tit"	2:47
6.	"Lunch Money"	2:39
7.	"¡Yo Se!"	3:30
8.	"Sickazz Dog"	5:53
9.	"Coming Out Party"	5:27
10.	"Blue Is the Frequency"	8:54
