= Cats and Dogs (Royal Trux album) =

Studio album by Royal Trux
- Released: June 21, 1993
- Recorded: 1993
- Studio: Omega, Rockville, Maryland
- Genre: Noise rock, punk blues, alternative rock
- Length: 41:53
- Label: Drag City

Royal Trux chronology
untitled (1992)	Cats and Dogs (1993)	Thank You (1995)

Professional ratings
Review scores
Source	Rating
AllMusic	4.5/5 stars
BBC	very favorable
Drowned in Sound	9/10
Melody Maker	favorable
NME	7/10
Option	favorable
Ox-Fanzine	3.5/5 stars
Rolling Stone	4/5 stars
Spectrum Culture	4/5 stars
Tiny Mix Tapes	favorable

Cats and Dogs is the fourth studio album by Royal Trux. It was released in 1993 on Drag City.

== Track listing ==
All tracks are written by Neil Hagerty and Jennifer Herrema.

No.	Title	Length
1.	"Teeth"	5:04
2.	"The Flag"	2:23
3.	"Friends"	2:37
4.	"The Spectre"	2:07
5.	"Skywood Greenback Mantra"	3:10
6.	"Turn of the Century"	7:04
7.	"Up the Sleeve"	4:26
8.	"Hot and Cold Skulls"	2:33
9.	"Tight Pants"	2:29
10.	"Let's Get Lost"	3:01
11.	"Driving in That Car (With the Eagle on the Hood)"	6:50

== Personnel ==
Credits adapted from liner notes.

- Jennifer Herrema – vocals
- Neil Hagerty – guitar
- Mike Kaiser – guitar
- Ian Willers – drums
- Brian Smith – percussion
