= Telescopic (album) =

Studio album by Edith Frost
- Released: October 20, 1998
- Genre: Alt-country
- Length: 39:25
- Label: Drag City
- Producer: Neil Hagerty, Jennifer Herrema

Edith Frost chronology
Calling Over Time (1997)	Telescopic (1998)	Love Is Real (1999)

Professional ratings
Review scores
Source	Rating
AllMusic	4/5 stars
Pitchfork Media	7.7/10

Telescopic is the second album by Edith Frost. It was released in 1998 through Drag City.

== Critical reception ==
No Depression wrote that "with a pure snowfall of distortion, bending, swirling chords, and a cool, clear voice that rises into the stratosphere like a singular, heavenly choir, Edith Frost’s second album, Telescopic, walks the line between tradition and innovation." The Chicago Tribune wrote: "A mix of clean C&W hickory and piquant avant-rock fuzz, Telescopic is an engaging, if less immediate, record that suffers only from its static mood and pacing."

== Track listing ==
All tracks are written by Edith Frost.

No.	Title	Length
1.	"Walk on the Fire"	4:48
2.	"On Hold"	2:33
3.	"Light"	2:41
4.	"The Very Earth"	3:58
5.	"You Belong to No One"	2:15
6.	"Telescopic"	2:42
7.	"Falling"	3:25
8.	"Bluish Bells"	2:51
9.	"Through the Trees"	2:54
10.	"My Capture"	3:20
11.	"Tender Kiss"	3:32
12.	"Are You Sure?"	4:26

== Personnel ==
Musicians

- Jean Cook – violin
- Amy Domingues – cello
- Edith Frost – vocals, guitar
- Ryan Hembrey – bass guitar
- Rian Murphy – drums
- Jason Quick – flute, photography

Production and additional personnel

- John Golden – mastering
- Neil Hagerty – production
- Jennifer Herrema – production
- Christian Quick – engineering
