= Radio Video =

EP by Royal Trux
- Released: January 17, 2000
- Genre: Rock
- Length: 16:47
- Label: Drag City; Domino

Royal Trux chronology
Veterans of Disorder (1999)	Radio Video (2000)	Pound for Pound (2000)

Professional ratings
Review scores
Source	Rating
AllMusic	3.5/5 stars
CMJ	(favorable)

Radio Video is an EP by Royal Trux. It was released as a one-sided twelve-inch and CD in 2000 by Drag City.

== Track listing ==
All songs written by Neil Hagerty and Jennifer Herrema

1. "The Inside Game" – 3:42
2. "Victory Chimp: Episode 3" – 4:37
3. "Dirty Headlines" – 3:27
4. "Mexican Comet" – 1:37
5. "On My Mind" – 3:24
