= Hand of Glory (album) =

Studio album by Royal Trux
- Released: October 8, 2002
- Recorded: 1985–1989
- Genre: Noise rock
- Length: 40:02
- Label: Drag City

Royal Trux chronology
Pound for Pound (2000)	Hand of Glory (2002)	White Stuff (2019)

Professional ratings
Review scores
Source	Rating
Pitchfork	8.2/10
Uncut	4/5 stars
The Wire	favorable

Hand of Glory is a studio album by Royal Trux. It is composed of recordings made 1985 to 1989 and was released by Drag City in 2002.

== Track listing ==
All tracks are written by Neil Hagerty and Jennifer Herrema.

No.	Title	Length
1.	"Domo des Burros (Two Sticks)"	19:32
2.	"The Boxing Story: A. Electric Boxing Show"	3:00
3.	"The Boxing Story: B. Four Kings"	4:00
4.	"The Boxing Story: C. Golden Lament"	5:00
5.	"The Boxing Story: D. Pots and Pansy"	4:00
6.	"The Boxing Story: E. K-9 to the Core"	4:30
