= Accelerator (Royal Trux album) =

Studio album by Royal Trux
- Released: April 21, 1998
- Genre: Rock, noise rock, alternative rock
- Length: 35:16
- Label: Drag City

Royal Trux chronology
Singles, Live, Unreleased (1997)	Accelerator (1998)	3-Song EP (1998)

Accelerator is the seventh studio album by Royal Trux. It was released on Drag City in 1998. It peaked at number 32 on the UK Independent Albums Chart.

== Critical reception ==
Professional ratings
Review scores
Source	Rating
AllMusic	4.5/5 stars
Drowned in Sound	8/10
The Guardian	5/5 stars
Mojo	4/5 stars
NME	8/10
Pitchfork	8.8/10
PopMatters	6/10
Q	4/5 stars
Uncut	10/10

Stephen Thomas Erlewine of AllMusic said, "Royal Trux have rarely had both their songwriting and noise under control like they do here, and the result is pure dynamite -- possibly their best album to date."

NME named it the 8th best album of 1998. Pitchfork placed it at number 29 on the "50 Best Albums of 1998" list.

At Metacritic, which assigns a weighted average score out of 100 to reviews from mainstream critics, the album's 2012 reissue received an average score of 83 out of 100 based on 10 reviews, indicating "universal acclaim".

== Track listing ==
All tracks are written by Neil Hagerty and Jennifer Herrema.

No.	Title	Length
1.	"I'm Ready"	3:54
2.	"Yellow Kid"	2:10
3.	"The Banana Question"	3:43
4.	"Another Year"	4:03
5.	"Juicy, Juicy, Juice"	5:34
6.	"Liar"	2:48
7.	"New Bones"	4:47
8.	"Follow the Winner"	3:24
9.	"Stevie (for Steven S.)"	4:53
Total length:		35:16

Japanese edition bonus tracks
No.	Title	Length
10.	"P.T.20"	2:05
11.	"Mr. Crump Don't Like It"	2:03
Total length:		39:24

== Personnel ==
Credits adapted from liner notes.

- Jennifer Herrema – vocals, recording, mixing
- Neil Hagerty – vocals, guitar, bass guitar, keyboards, MIDI, tin whistle, kazoo, harmonica, percussion, recording, mixing
- Ken Nasta – drums, percussion
- Timothy McClain – synthesizer
- Rian Murphy – chorus vocals
- Paul Oldham – live sound recording
- Konrad Strauss – pre-mastering
- Howie Weinberg – mastering
- Dan Osborn – layout
- Patsy Desmond – photography
- Dan Koretzky – special operations

== Charts ==
Chart	Peak position
UK Independent Albums (OCC)	32
