= Nightclub Version of the Eternal =

Studio album by The Howling Hex
- Released: September 19, 2006
- Recorded: March 30 – April 9, 2006, New Mexico
- Genre: Rock
- Length: 51:57
- Label: Drag City

The Howling Hex chronology
1-2-3 (2006)	Nightclub Version of the Eternal (2006)	The Howling Hex XI (2007)

Professional ratings
Review scores
Source	Rating
AllMusic	2.5/5 stars
Baltimore City Paper	favorable Sep. 13, 2006
Drowned in Sound	9/10
Dusted Magazine	unfavorable Sep. 24, 2006
Tiny Mix Tapes	1.5/5 stars
The Village Voice	favorable Sep. 26, 2006

Nightclub Version of the Eternal is an album by The Howling Hex. It was released as a CD by Drag City in 2006.

== Track listing ==
All songs written by the Howling Hex

1. "Hammer and Bluebird" – 7:25
2. "Lips Begin to Move" – 7:35
3. "This Planet Sweet" – 7:51
4. "How Many Steps Now" – 7:19
5. "Good Things Are Easy" – 7:31
6. "Six Pack Days" – 7:41
7. "Out, Out, Out" – 6:35

== Personnel ==
- The Howling Hex:
  - Neil Michael Hagerty – baritone guitar, vocals
  - Mike Saenz – electric guitar, vocals
  - Lyn Madison – percussion, vocals
- Dan Sylvester – percussion
