= Earth Junk =

Studio album by The Howling Hex
- Released: September 23, 2008
- Recorded: Premium Recording, Austin, Texas
- Genre: Rock
- Length: 33:00
- Label: Drag City
- Producer: The Howling Hex

The Howling Hex chronology
The Howling Hex XI (2007)	Earth Junk (2008)	Rogue Moon (2009)

Earth Junk is a studio album by indie rock band The Howling Hex. It was released by Drag City in 2008.

Professional ratings
Review scores
Source	Rating
AllMusic	3.5/5 stars
Pitchfork Media	4.5/10
PopMatters	(favorable)
Tiny Mix Tapes	2.5/5 stars

== Track listing ==
All songs written by the Howling Hex except where noted.

1. "Big Chief Big Wheel" – 2:50
2. "Sundays Are Ruined Again" – 3:09
3. "Annie Get Redzy" – 3:23
4. "Faithful Sister" – 1:56
5. "Contraband & Betrayal" (Angel Gonzalez) – 4:00
6. "No Good Reason" – 3:04
7. "The Arrows" – 3:03
8. "Blood & Dust" – 4:05
9. "Coffin Up Cash" – 6:19
10. "O Why, Sports Coat?" – 1:15

== Personnel ==
- The Howling Hex:
  - Neil Michael Hagerty – guitar, voice, electronics
  - Sweney Tidball – Hammond B3, Fender Rhodes, synthesizer
  - Eleanor Whitmore – voice
