= It's a Game (Edith Frost album) =

Studio album by Edith Frost
- Released: November 15, 2005
- Genre: Alt-country
- Length: 49:32
- Label: Drag City
- Producer: Rian Murphy

Edith Frost chronology
Demos (2004)	It's a Game (2005)

Professional ratings
Review scores
Source	Rating
AllMusic	4.5/5 stars
The Austin Chronicle	3/4 stars
Entertainment Weekly	B+
Pitchfork Media	(5.8/10)

It's a Game is the fourth album by Edith Frost, released in 2005 through Drag City.

== Critical reception ==
The Chicago Tribune called it "a profound, stylistically boundless album that's one of [2005]'s finest records." Billboard wrote that "Frost's voice is still sweet and innocent sounding, but her subject matters are hardly lightweight material."

== Track listing ==
All tracks are written by Edith Frost.

No.	Title	Length
1.	"Emergency"	4:15
2.	"It's a Game"	3:28
3.	"What's the Use"	4:04
4.	"A Mirage"	5:24
5.	"Playmate"	2:58
6.	"My Lover Won't Call"	4:34
7.	"Lucky Charm"	3:11
8.	"Larger Than Life"	3:15
9.	"Just a Friend"	3:46
10.	"If It Weren't for the Words"	3:39
11.	"Stars Fading"	3:52
12.	"Good to Know"	3:53
13.	"Lovin' You Goodbye"	2:17

== Personnel ==
Musicians

- Joshua Abrams – bass guitar
- Lindsay Anderson – piano
- Dave "Max" Crawford – trumpet
- Edith Frost – vocals, guitar, photography
- Mark Greenberg – organ, engineering, mixing
- John Hasbrouck – guitar
- Ryan Hembrey – bass guitar
- Emmett Kelly – guitar
- Rian Murphy – drums, production
- Jason Toth – drums
- Azita Youssefi – piano

Production and additional personnel

- Barry Phipps – engineering, mixing
- Roger Seibel – mastering
