= Love Is Real (EP) =

EP by Edith Frost
- Released: July 19, 1999
- Recorded: Solid Sound Studios, Chicago, Illinois
- Genre: Alt-country
- Length: 9:02
- Label: Drag City
- Producer: Rian Murphy

Edith Frost chronology
Telescopic (1998)	Love Is Real (1999)	Wonder Wonder (2001)

Professional ratings
Review scores
Source	Rating
AllMusic	4/5 stars
Pitchfork Media	(7.7/10)

Love Is Real is an EP by Edith Frost, released in 1999 through Drag City.

== Critical reception ==
CMJ New Music Report called it "a captivating display of the talents of Ms. Frost."

== Track listing ==
All tracks are written by Edith Frost.

No.	Title	Length
1.	"Love Is Real"	3:46
2.	"Between Us"	3:05
3.	"The Last One"	2:11

== Personnel ==
Musicians

- Edith Frost – vocals, guitar
- Mark Greenberg – organ
- Ryan Hembrey – bass guitar
- Archer Prewitt – guitar, drums
- Rick Rizzo – guitar

Production and additional personnel

- Phil Bonnet – mixing, recording
- Sam Prekop – painting
- Rian Murphy – production
- Alexis Wilson – photography
