= All-Night Fox =

Studio album by The Howling Hex
- Released: February 21, 2005
- Recorded: 2004
- Genre: Rock
- Length: 35:27
- Label: Drag City

The Howling Hex chronology
The Return of the Third Tower (2004)	All-Night Fox (2005)	You Can't Beat Tomorrow (2005)

Professional ratings
Review scores
Source	Rating
AllMusic	4/5 stars
Pitchfork	6.8/10
Tiny Mix Tapes	2.5/5 stars

All-Night Fox is an album by The Howling Hex. It was released as a CD by Drag City in 2005.

== Track listing ==
1. "Now, We're Gonna Sing" – 3:36
2. "Instilled With Mem'ry" – 4:26
3. "Pair Back Up Mass With" – 3:57
4. "Activity Risks" – 5:06
5. "To His Own Front Door" – 4:59
6. "What, Man? Who Are You?!" – 7:15
7. "Cast Aside the False" – 2:10
8. "Soft Enfolding Spreads" – 3:58

== Reception ==
- Stylus (B)
- Uncut Mar. 2005, p. 96
- The Wire (favorable) Apr. 2005, p. 59

== Personnel ==
- The Howling Hex:
  - Neil Michael Hagerty – vocals, lead guitar
  - July McClure – vocals, bass guitar
  - Lynn Madison – vocals, drums
  - Pete Denton – rhythm guitar
