= Pound for Pound (Royal Trux album) =

Studio album by Royal Trux
- Released: June 6, 2000
- Recorded: February 6 – 11 2000
- Studio: Sound of Music, Richmond, Virginia
- Genre: Rock
- Length: 43:30
- Label: Drag City

Royal Trux chronology
Radio Video (2000)	Pound for Pound (2000)	Hand of Glory (2002)

Professional ratings
Review scores
Source	Rating
AllMusic	4/5 stars
Magnet	favorable
Melody Maker	3/5 stars
NME	7/10
Pitchfork	5.6/10
Spin	7/10 stars
The Wire	favorable

Pound for Pound is the ninth studio album by Royal Trux. It was released in 2000 by Drag City.

== Track listing ==
All tracks are written by Neil Hagerty and Jennifer Herrema.

No.	Title	Length
1.	"Call Out the Lions"	4:36
2.	"Fire Hill"	2:28
3.	"Platinum Tips"	3:56
4.	"Accelerator (The Original)"	3:09
5.	"Deep Country Sorcerer"	7:05
6.	"Sunshine and Grease"	3:58
7.	"Blind Navigator"	5:15
8.	"Teenage Murder Mystery"	3:36
9.	"Small Thief"	3:41
10.	"Dr. Gone"	5:46
