= Neil Michael Hagerty (album) =

Studio album by Neil Michael Hagerty
- Released: February 20, 2001
- Recorded: June – October 2000
- Genre: Rock
- Length: 42:54
- Labels: Drag City; Domino

Neil Michael Hagerty chronology
Neil Michael Hagerty (2001)	Plays That Good Old Rock and Roll (2002)

Professional ratings
Review scores
Source	Rating
AllMusic	4/5 stars
Magnet	(favorable)
NME	7/10 stars
Pitchfork Media	(6.4/10)
PopMatters	(favorable)

Neil Michael Hagerty is the debut solo album by Neil Michael Hagerty, formerly of Royal Trux. It was released as an LP and CD by Drag City in 2001.

== Track listing ==
All songs written by Hagerty

=== Side one ===
1. "Know That" – 2:40
2. "Fortune and Fear" – 5:18
3. "Repeat the Sound of Joy" – 1:15
4. "Kali, the Carpenter" – 5:25
5. "Whiplash in Park" – 4:32
6. "Creature Catcher" – 2:28

=== Side two ===
1. "I Found a Stranger" – 6:31
2. "Oh to Be Wicked Once Again" – 5:11
3. "Tender Metal" – 3:29
4. "The Menace" – 1:34
5. "Chicken, You Can Roost on the Moon" – 4:31
