= Demos (Edith Frost album) =

Compilation album by Edith Frost
- Released: May 20, 2004
- Genre: Alternative country
- Length: 42:42
- Label: Comfort Stand

Edith Frost chronology
Wonder Wonder (2001)	Demos (2004)	It's a Game (2005)

Professional ratings
Review scores
Source	Rating
Pitchfork Media	(7.9/10)

Demos is a compilation album by Edith Frost, issued as a free download online on May 20, 2004 through Comfort Stand Recordings. It contains demos of songs that appeared on her first three albums.

== Track listing ==
All tracks are written by Edith Frost, except "I Get the Craziest Feeling" by Floyd Tillman and "Look What Thoughts Will Do" by Lefty Frizzell.

No.	Title	Length
1.	"Who"	3:41
2.	"Cars and Parties"	3:51
3.	"Temporary Loan"	5:18
4.	"On Hold"	2:43
5.	"One-Chord Complaint"	3:48
6.	"Dreamers"	3:43
7.	"Walk on the Fire"	4:16
8.	"Pony Song"	3:24
9.	"Wonder Wonder"	3:51
10.	"(I Get The) Craziest Feeling"	3:58
11.	"Look What Thoughts Will Do"	3:37

== Personnel ==
- Jim Becker – guitar, dobro and violin on "I Get the Craziest Feeling" and "Look What Thoughts Will Do"
- Edith Frost – vocals, acoustic guitar
- Ryan Hembrey – bass guitar and piano on "I Get the Craziest Feeling" and "Look What Thoughts Will Do"
- Davina Pallone – cover art
- Jim White – drums on "I Get the Craziest Feeling" and "Look What Thoughts Will Do"
