= Plays That Good Old Rock and Roll =

Studio album by Neil Michael Hagerty
- Released: February 4, 2002
- Recorded: Electrical Audio, Chicago
- Genre: Rock
- Length: 31:38
- Label: Drag City

Neil Michael Hagerty chronology
Neil Michael Hagerty (2001)	Plays That Good Old Rock and Roll (2002)	Weird War (2002)

Professional ratings
Review scores
Source	Rating
AllMusic	3/5 stars
Pitchfork Media	(5.2/10)

Plays That Good Old Rock and Roll is the second album by Neil Michael Hagerty. It was released as an LP and CD by Drag City in 2002.

== Track listing ==
All songs written by Hagerty

=== Side one ===
1. "Gratitude" – 3:53
2. "Oklahoma Township" – 3:51
3. "The Storm Song" – 3:08
4. "Shaved C*nt" – 4:39

=== Side two ===
1. "Some People Are Crazy" – 3:10
2. "Louisa La Ray" – 6:31
3. "It Could Happen Again" – 1:54
4. "Sayonora" – 2:35
5. "Rockslide" – 1:57

== Personnel ==
- Neil Michael Hagerty – guitar, vocals
- Tim Barnes – drums, gongs
- Dan Brown – acoustic bass
- Edith Frost – vocals
- Miighty Flashlight – electric bass, piano
- The Riverview Ramblers – vocal chorus
- Adam Shelton – saxophone
- Susan Voelz – violin
