= The Howling Hex XI =

Studio album by The Howling Hex
- Released: August 20, 2007
- Recorded: March 25–27, 2007, Semaphore Studios, Chicago
- Genre: Rock
- Length: 32:57
- Label: Drag City

The Howling Hex chronology
Nightclub Version of the Eternal (2006)	The Howling Hex XI (2007)	Earth Junk (2008)

Professional ratings
Review scores
Source	Rating
AllMusic	3.5/5 stars
Cleveland Scene	unfavorable
Pitchfork Media	6.4/10
Spin	unfavorable
Tiny Mix Tapes	2/5 stars

The Howling Hex XI is an album by The Howling Hex. It was released as a CD and LP by Drag City in 2007.

== Track listing ==
1. "Keychains" (Neil Michael Hagerty) – 2:36
2. "Fifth Dimensional Johnny B. Goode" (Mike Signs) – 3:11
3. "Martyr Lectures Comedian" (Hagerty) – 2:20
4. "Live Wire" (Andy MacLeod) – 2:18
5. "Dr. Slaughter" (Phil Jenks, Signs) – 2:43
6. "Let Fridays Decide" (Jenks) – 1:45
7. "Lines in the Sky" (Signs) – 3:36
8. "Save/Spend" (Lee) – 2:43
9. "Ambulance Across the Street" (Hagerty) – 2:23
10. "Everybody's Doing It" (Signs) – 2:42
11. "The 88" (Hagerty) – 4:16
12. "Theme" (Howling Hex) – 2:24

=== Personnel ===
- The Howling Hex:
  - Neil Michael Hagerty – six-string bass, vocals
  - Phil Jenks – percussion, drums, vocals
  - Rob Lee – saxophone, flute, vocals
  - Andy MacLeod – drums, percussion, vocals
  - Mike Signs – guitar
