= Royal Trux (1988 album) =

Studio album by Royal Trux
- Released: 1988
- Genre: Noise rock, experimental rock
- Length: 47:38
- Label: Royal
- Producer: Neil Hagerty, Jennifer Herrema

Royal Trux chronology
Royal Trux (1988)	Twin Infinitives (1990)

Professional ratings
Review scores
Source	Rating
AllMusic	2.5/5 stars
Alternative Press	favorable
Q	3/5 stars

Royal Trux is the debut studio album by the American band Royal Trux. It was released in 1988 as an LP on Royal Records, then reissued in 1993 as a CD on Drag City.

== Track listing ==
All tracks are written by Neil Hagerty and Jennifer Herrema.

No.	Title	Length
1.	"Bad Blood"	2:51
2.	"Incineration"	2:16
3.	"Strawberry Soda"	2:42
4.	"Hashish"	2:06
5.	"Sanction Smith"	1:42
6.	"Zero Dok"	2:38
7.	"Touch"	2:34
8.	"Bits and Spurs"	5:02
9.	"Esso Dame"	2:26
10.	"Sice I Bones"	3:23
11.	"Gold Dust"	1:39
12.	"Jesse James"	3:52
13.	"Andersonville"	5:53
14.	"The Set-Up"	2:20
15.	"Walking Machine"	3:00
16.	"Hawk'n Around"	3:14

== Personnel ==
Credits adapted from liner notes.

- Neil Hagerty – vocals, guitar, percussion, production
- Jennifer Herrema – vocals, organ, percussion, production
