= Twin Infinitives =

Studio album by Royal Trux
- Released: December 15, 1990
- Recorded: October 1989–June 1990
- Studio: Lowdown, San Francisco, California
- Genre: Noise music, experimental rock, avant-garde
- Length: 63:37
- Label: Drag City
- Producer: Neil Hagerty, Jennifer Herrema

Royal Trux chronology
Royal Trux (1988)	Twin Infinitives (1990)	Royal Trux (1992)

Twin Infinitives is the second studio album by Royal Trux. It was released as a double LP in 1990 by Drag City, then reissued on CD and cassette in 1994. Twin Infinitives is the first full-length album released under Chicago independent label Drag City.

Twin Infinitives is noted for its deconstructed arrangements, unorthodox vocals and dense production; all were extremes rarely visited to the same degrees on Royal Trux's later releases.

Professional ratings
Review scores
Source	Rating
AllMusic	3.5/5 stars
Drowned in Sound	5/10
The Encyclopedia of Popular Music	2/5 stars
NME	9/10
Select	4/5 marks
Spin Alternative Record Guide	9/10
Uncut	9/10

== Track listing ==
All tracks are written by Neil Hagerty and Jennifer Herrema.

Side A
No.	Title	Length
1.	"Solid Gold Tooth"	2:01
2.	"Ice Cream"	3:30
3.	"Jet Pet"	4:24
4.	"RTX-USA"	2:21
5.	"Kool Down Wheels"	2:19

Side B
No.	Title	Length
6.	"Chances Are the Comets in Our Future"	6:22
7.	"Yin Jim Versus the Vomit Creature"	5:27
8.	"Osiris"	3:52

Side C
No.	Title	Length
9.	"(Edge of the) Ape Oven"	14:32

Side D
No.	Title	Length
10.	"Florida Avenue Theme"	1:03
11.	"Lick My Boots"	4:27
12.	"Glitterbust"	3:42
13.	"Funky Son"	2:48
14.	"Ratcreeps"	2:48
15.	"New York Avenue Bridge"	3:42
Total length:		63:37

== Personnel ==
Credits adapted from liner notes.

- Neil Hagerty – vocals, guitar, percussion, production
- Jennifer Herrema – vocals, organ, percussion, production
- Greg Freeman – engineering
