= Wonder Wonder =

Studio album by Edith Frost
- Released: July 17, 2001
- Recorded: Electrical Audio Recording
- Genre: Alternative country
- Length: 41:35
- Label: Drag City
- Producer: Rian Murphy

Edith Frost chronology
Love Is Real (1999)	Wonder Wonder (2001)	Demos (2004)

Professional ratings
Review scores
Source	Rating
AllMusic	4.5/5 stars
Pitchfork Media	8.7/10

Wonder Wonder is the third album by Edith Frost, released in 2001 through Drag City.

== Critical reception ==
No Depression wrote that "Frost’s unpolished but beautifully tuneful voice elegantly shifts through the stylistic changes, which in turn are effortlessly navigated by Chicago-area players including Rick Rizzo and Archer Prewitt." Exclaim! wrote: "Chicagoan Edith Frost's third album continues the path of heart-wrenching, introspective and beautiful songwriting, backed with simple, spare arrangements and her haunting, hint-of-twang voice." The Washington Post thought that "Frost's old-timey songs can sound like genre exercises, but the best of these tunes – whether the lively 'Cars and Parties' or the unhurried 'You're Decided' – are specific and personal."

== Track listing ==
All tracks are written by Edith Frost.

No.	Title	Length
1.	"True"	2:37
2.	"Cars and Parties"	3:24
3.	"Who"	3:51
4.	"Wonder Wonder"	3:08
5.	"Hear My Heart"	3:45
6.	"The Fear"	3:22
7.	"Dreamers"	3:32
8.	"Further"	3:23
9.	"Merry Go Round"	4:18
10.	"Easy to Love"	3:17
11.	"Honey Please"	2:24
12.	"You're Decided"	4:35

== Personnel ==
Musicians

- Amy Domingues – cello
- Steve Dorocke – steel guitar
- Edith Frost – vocals, guitar
- Mark Greenberg – organ
- Ryan Hembrey – bass guitar
- Glenn Kotche – drums
- Bill Lowman – bass guitar
- Paul Mertens – flute
- Rian Murphy – drums, production
- Archer Prewitt – guitar, drums
- Rick Rizzo – guitar
- Susan Voelz – violin

Production and additional personnel

- Steve Albini – engineering
- John Golden – mastering
- Deborah Moore – photography
