= Neil Michael Hagerty & the Howling Hex =

Studio album by Neil Michael Hagerty
- Released: May 20, 2003
- Recorded: Soma Electronic Music Studios, Chicago; Sound of Music Studios, Richmond, Virginia; Bottom of the Hill, San Francisco
- Genre: Rock
- Length: 65:40
- Label: Drag City

Neil Michael Hagerty chronology
Weird War (2002)	Neil Michael Hagerty & the Howling Hex (2003)	Introducing the Howling Hex (2003)

Professional ratings
Review scores
Source	Rating
AllMusic	3.5/5 stars
Mojo	Aug. 2003, p. 95
Pitchfork Media	6.6/10

Neil Michael Hagerty & the Howling Hex is an album by Neil Michael Hagerty. It is the last album to be released under Hagerty's name; subsequent releases have been credited to The Howling Hex. The album was released as a CD and double LP by Drag City in 2003.

== Track listing ==
All songs written by Hagerty except where noted

=== Side one ===
1. "Firebase Ripcord" – 3:29
2. "Out of Reach" – 2:27
3. "Watching the Sands" – 2:23
4. "Gray" (Hagerty/Carol Lewis) – 1:56
5. "Rockslide (live)" – 6:04

=== Side two ===
1. "Greasy Saint" – 2:07
2. "Fat Street" – 2:52
3. "Clermont Heights" (Tim Barnes/Dan Brown/Hagerty) – 1:05
4. "I'm Your Son" – 3:05
5. "Creature Catcher (live)" – 7:28

=== Side three ===
1. "The Brooklyn Battery" – 2:03
2. "Carrier Dog" – 1:54
3. "Witch" (Hagerty/Phil Jenks) – 1:29
4. "I Remember Old John Brown" – 1:24
5. "She Drove a Rusted Sled" (Barnes/Brown/Hagerty) – 2:18
6. "White Sex" – 1:43
7. "Rckslyd Var." – 1:10
8. "Car Commercial" – 4:10

=== Side four ===
1. "AEP 1" – 1:41
2. "AEP 11" – 2:33
3. "Energy Plan" (Barnes/Brown/Hagerty) – 12:19
