= 1-2-3 (Howling Hex album) =

Compilation album by Howling Hex
- Released: February 21, 2006
- Genre: Rock
- Length: 48:01
- Label: Drag City

Howling Hex chronology
| You Can't Beat Tomorrow (2005) | 1-2-3 (2006) | Nightclub Version of the Eternal (2006) |

Professional ratings
Review scores
| Source | Rating |
|---|---|
| Pitchfork | 6.1/10 |
| MusicOMH | 3/5 stars |

1-2-3 is the sixth album by Howling Hex. It is composed of re-edited versions of songs previously issued on that band's first three albums. It was released as a CD by Drag City in 2005.

== Track listing ==
All tracks are written by Howling Hex, except where noted.

| No. | Title | Length |
|---|---|---|
| 1. | "If You Can't Tell the Difference, Why Pay Less?" | 2:16 |
| 2. | "Aim Pride Show" | 1:20 |
| 3. | "Catalytic Convert" | 2:41 |
| 4. | "Breakaway" (William Truckaway) | 2:18 |
| 5. | "Imaginary Saints" | 2:11 |
| 6. | "You Remind Me That I'm Hanging by a Moment" | 2:07 |
| 7. | "Centerville Springs" | 2:25 |
| 8. | "De Colores" (Trad. Arr. Howling Hex) | 2:01 |
| 9. | "I'm Rocklyn Immigrant" | 1:34 |
| 10. | "Doing Fine" | 1:42 |
| 11. | "The Preserve, the Common" | 1:44 |
| 12. | "Where's the Party at, Peaches and Cream? (It's Been a While)" | 2:01 |
| 13. | "Pretty" | 1:41 |
| 14. | "Slapshot!" | 1:37 |
| 15. | "Hero" | 2:06 |
| 16. | "Bird to Mutt" | 1:21 |
| 17. | "Be the Last to Stay in a Haunted House" | 2:40 |
| 18. | "Rock-a-Doodle-Doo" (Linda Lewis) | 2:30 |
| 19. | "When You Got Money" | 2:29 |
| 20. | "Wrong Ace" | 2:06 |
| 21. | "Fatter Than Anything" | 2:18 |
| 22. | "Juniper Tree" | 2:36 |
| 23. | "See Copy" | 2:17 |
