= Every Child Counts =

Series of public education reforms in Nigeria

Every Child Counts is the name given to a series of public school education reforms in Kwara, Nigeria. In a bid to resuscitate public education in its state, the Kwara State Government under the leadership of Governor Bukola Saraki introduced a package of extensive reforms in the education sector. These reforms are also called the Education Charter for Kwara State, and were designed to put "children at the heart of education" in the state.

== History ==
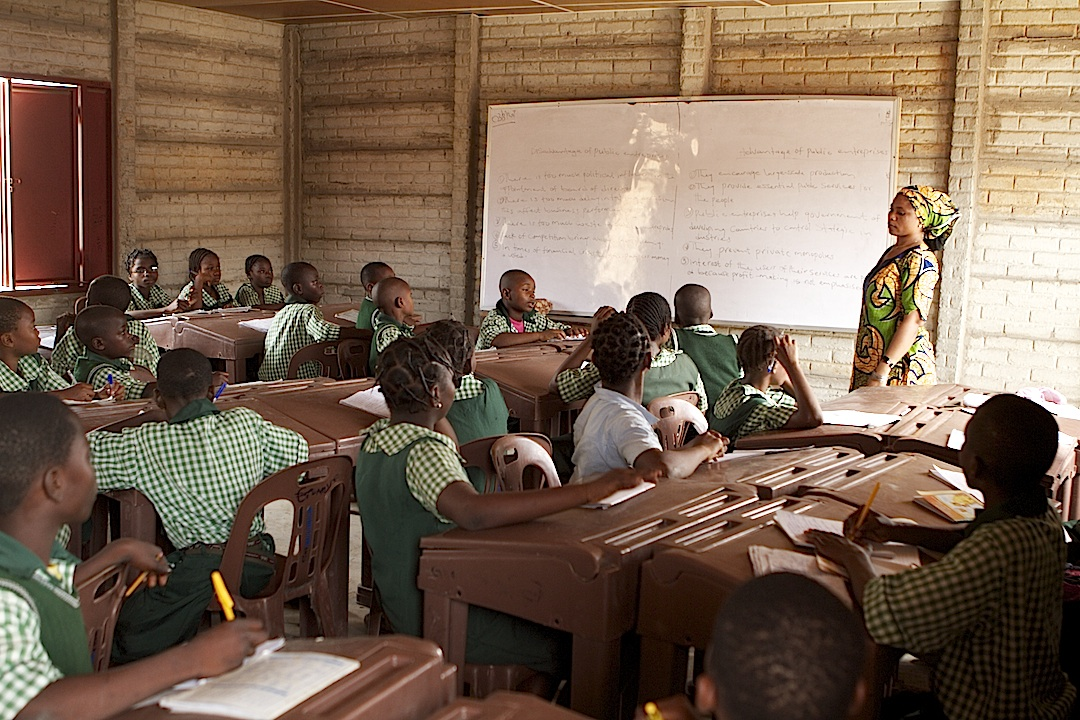
Pupils at a public elementary school in Kwara

Prior to the introduction of the reforms, public education was in dire straits in Kwara, as in many states in Nigeria. The quality of instruction in public schools was abysmally low. Enrollment in public schools dwindled, as parents (including the very poor) only took their wards to public schools when they could not afford the fee-paying private schools. Beginning from 2007, however, efforts were taken by the Kwara State Government to reverse the slide.

With strong political support from the state governor, the Kwara State Commissioner for Education, Science and Technology, Bolaji Abdullahi, introduced some interventions that would redefine the education landscape in the state. To incentivize and track learning in public schools, the state government decided that a benchmark ought to be created to measure the progress of children in public schools. The state also recognized that in order to have greater involvement and buy-in from the parents and guardians of the school children, there was a need for an accountability mechanism to help them monitor the progress of their children.

To determine the capacity of teachers to impart knowledge on their pupils, a test based on grade 4 curriculum was administered to the politically powerful primary school teachers in Kwara public schools. The majority of the teachers failed the test. As a result, massive training was held for all the teachers and teaching manuals were developed to guide the teachers. After discovering that most pupils lack basic literacy and numeracy skills, the state government also decided to reduce the number of subjects taught to students to ensure that more emphasis is placed on the ability of the pupils to read and write as well as undertake basic sums. Benchmarks were created for the evaluation of the new curriculum which focuses on literacy and numeracy. These were distributed to the teachers and the parents.

== Four pillars of reform ==
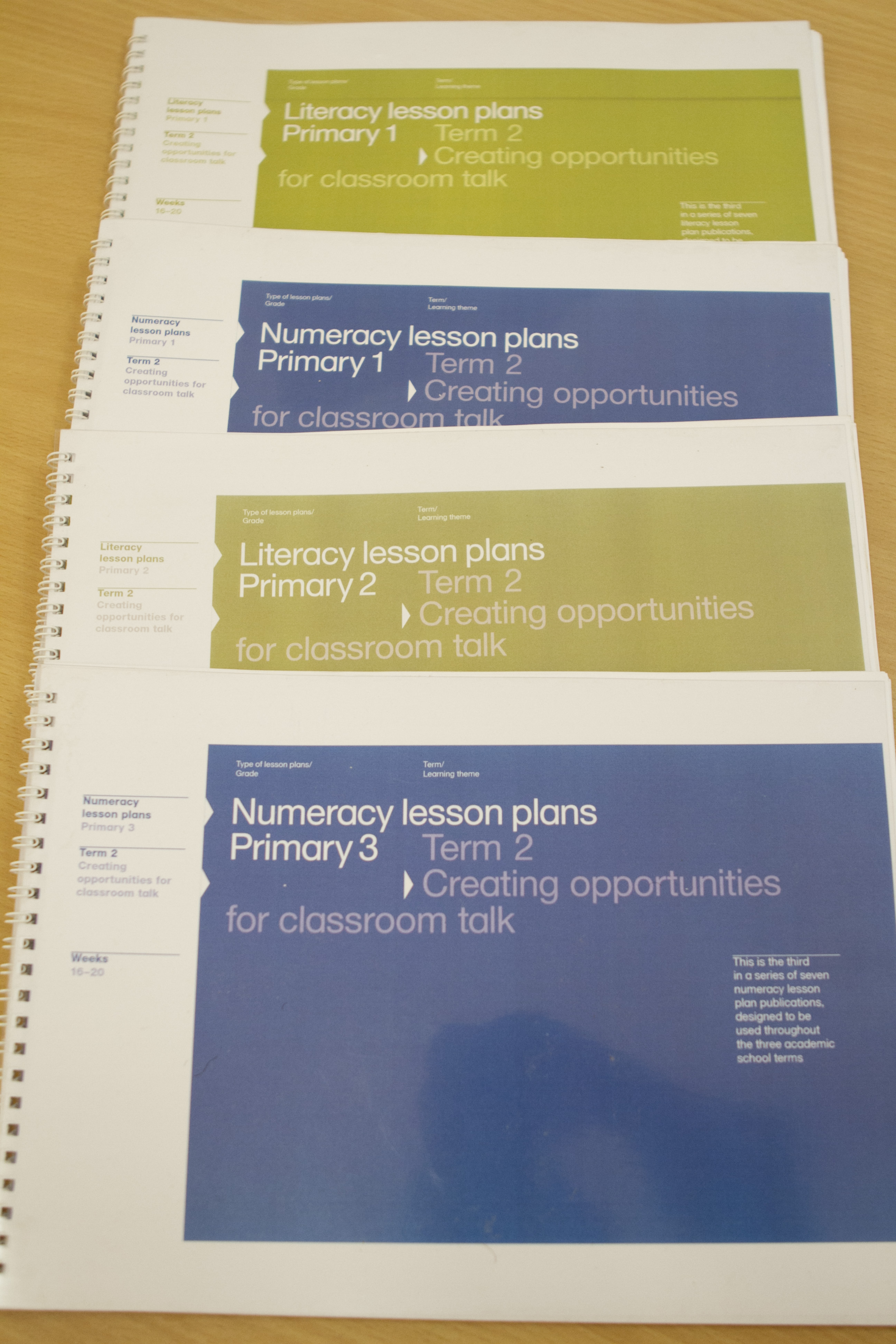
Lesson manuals for teachers

The Kwara State Every Child Counts education reform is aimed at providing quality education in public schools in the state. As enunciated by the state government, the reform revolves around answering the following questions:

- When we put children in schools, what do you expect them to be able to do?
- How well are children learning in schools?
- How do we ensure that children learn effectively in our schools?

Based on a review of the situation on the ground and to ensure that proper learning is taking place in its public schools, the state government build the reform around four pillars. These are:

1.Teaching quality improvement

This is to ensure regular, structured assessment for teachers complemented by professional development courses for them to improve their skills. It is also designed to ensure that the curriculum continually remains relevant and is tailored to match the needs of local children.

2.Inspectorate development

Setting and maintaining a high standard of education is at the core of Every Child Counts. A clear set of quality assurance standards will be devised for every school, both public and private. Schools will be supported to develop systems to assess their own quality as well as evaluate their own needs.

3.The College of Education turn-around

Improve the capacity of Colleges of Education to produce the right quality of teachers needed. Update the curriculum of the College of in line with the current demands of teaching in primary schools.

4.Institution building

Execute series of capacity building activities at the ministry of Education, Science and Technology, the state Universal Basic Education and the Teaching Service Commission. Strengthen the State Education Management Information System (EMIS) to enable the state to collate, retrieve, deploy and employ data on education in the state.

== Impact ==
Every Child Counts prioritises the educational needs of children. Its focus is on the ability of children to, at the minimum, be able to read and write and be able to do basic arithmetic. The retraining of teachers and the introduction of the teaching manuals for all teachers ensure that teachers are capable of taking charge of the classroom and delivering quality education to the children. The introduction of a detailed benchmark for monitoring the performance of the children, allows parents the opportunity to be a part of the learning process taking place and to engage their children. The bold step taken by Kwara State to revitalise public education is endorsed as best practice by the federal authorities and the donor community in Nigeria.
