= Edith Frost =

American musician

- Born: Edith Frost; 18 August 1964 (age 62)
- Origin: San Antonio, Texas, U.S.
- Genres: Alternative rock, indie rock, indie pop, folk rock, indie folk, folk-pop, psychedelic, alt-country, lo-fi
- Occupations: Singer-songwriter, musician
- Instruments: Vocals, guitar, keyboards, piano, synthesizers, maracas
- Years active: 1990–present
- Label: Drag City
- Website: edithfrost.com

Edith Frost (born August 18, 1964) is an American singer-songwriter who describes her music as "pensive countrified psychedelia".

Born in San Antonio, Texas, Frost moved to Brooklyn in 1990 where she played in the country bands The Holler Sisters, The Marfa Lights, and Edith and Her Roadhouse Romeos.

In 1996, she moved to Chicago after signing to the city's Drag City label, which released her demo as a self-titled EP. A second EP, Ancestors, followed in 1997.

Her debut album Calling Over Time was released in 1997, and featured Jim O'Rourke, David Grubbs, and Sean O'Hagan of Stereolab and the High Llamas. This was followed by Telescopic in 1998, which was produced by Neil Hagerty and Jennifer Herrema from the band Royal Trux.

In 2001 she released Wonder Wonder, which was engineered by Steve Albini, and the more sparse sounding It's a Game was released in 2005.

In 2014 she relocated to Austin and in the following year self-released the EP Nothing Comes Around, her first new music in fifteen years.

In 2025 she released her first album in nearly 20 years, In Space.

== Discography ==
Studio albums

- Calling Over Time (1997, Drag City)
- Telescopic (1998, Drag City)
- Wonder Wonder (2001, Drag City)
- It's a Game (2005, Drag City)
- In Space (2025, Drag City)

EPs

- Edith Frost (1996, Drag City)
- Ancestors (1997)
- Love Is Real (1999, Drag City)
- Nothing Comes Around (2020, self-released)

Compilations

- Demos (2004, Comfort Stand)
