= Sweet Sixteen and Never Been Kissed =

Song by the Blue Mountaineers
- Label: Regal

"Sweet Sixteen and Never Been Kissed" is a 1932 pop song released by the Blue Mountaineers as a 78 rpm record on the Regal label. The B side was "We Just Couldn't Say Goodbye". It was also released as a 10" 78 by the Midnight Minstrels on Broadcast Twelve Super in the same year (B side "Same Old Moon"). Copyright was registered 11 November 1932 in the US, words and music (with a ukulele accompaniment) attributed to Joseph George Gilbert, for Francis, Day and Hunter Ltd.

== Covers ==
As well as the Blue Mountaineers and the Midnight Minstrels, the song or music was released by:

- Jack Hylton on Decca (F-3227) (23 September 1932) b-side "Pal of My Dreams"
- Peggy Cochrane on Broadcast Twelve Super (1933) (Popular Melodies On A Piano - Part 1)
- Nat Gonella, 1981, in the compilation LP album Georgia On My Mind on Decca (RFL 12).

== In popular culture ==
- In Bingo calling, sixteen is announced as "Never been kissed, sweet sixteen".
- In Mary-Kate and Ashley's "Sweet Sixteen" series, volume 1 is called Never Been Kissed.

== See also ==
- Sweet Sixteen (disambiguation)
- Never Been Kissed (disambiguation)
- Sweet Little Sixteen
