= Sweet Sixteen =

Sweet Sixteen may refer to:

- Sweet sixteen (birthday), a party thrown in honor of a person's, typically a girl's, 16th birthday, primarily in the United States

== Film and television ==
- Sweet Sixteen (1928 film), featuring Reginald Sheffield
- Sweet Sixteen (1983 film), directed by Jim Sotos
- Sweet Sixteen (2002 film), directed by Ken Loach
- Sweet Sixteen (2016 film), Chinese-South Korean romance film
- Sweet Sixteen (2023 film), Canadian drama film directed by Alexa-Jeanne Dubé
- Sweet Sixteen (TV series), British sitcom with Penelope Keith
- "Sweet Sixteen", a season 3 episode of the television series CSI: NY
- "Sweet Sixteen" (Parks and Recreation), an episode of the American comedy television series Parks and Recreation
- "Sweet Sixteen" (Alexa & Katie), an episode of the American television series Alexa & Katie

== Music ==
=== Albums ===
- Sweet Sixteen (Reba McEntire album), 1989
- Sweet Sixteen (The Huntingtons album), 1996
- Sweet Sixteen (Royal Trux album), 1997
- Sweet Sixteen (Sarah Geronimo album), 2004
- Sweet 16 (album), by Dutch girl group Lisa, Amy & Shelley, 2011
- Sweet XVI, an EP by Mya, 2014

=== Songs ===
- "Sweet Sixteen", a song by Judy Garland, 1939
- "Sweet Sixteen", blues song by B.B. King and Joe Josea, 1959
- "Sweet Sixteen" (song), by Billy Idol, 1987
- "Sweet Sixteen", a song by Destiny's Child from the album The Writing's on the Wall, 1999
- "Sweet Sixteen", a Hilary Duff song from the album Metamorphosis, 2003
- "Sweet 16", a Green Day song from the album ¡Uno!, 2012

== Other ==
- "The Sweet Sixteen", the round of the NCAA Division I men's basketball tournament in which the final 16 teams compete
- Sweet 16 (group), a Bulgarian girl group
- SWEET16, an interpreted language in the Apple II computer
- Sweet Sixteen (KHSAA State Basketball Championship), Kentucky high school basketball tournaments
- Sweet Sixteen (Buffy novel), a 2002 novel based on the television series Buffy the Vampire Slayer
- Sweet Sixteen (Abdullahi novel), a 2017 novel by Bolaji Abdullahi
- Sweet Sixteen (apple), a variety of apple
- Sweet sixteen (hill), a breast-shaped hill in Kenya
- Sweet 16, a slang name for a 16-gauge shotgun
- Sweet 16, a slang term for the M16 rifle and early corresponding maintenance manual

== See also ==
- My Super Sweet 16, an MTV reality show
- "Sweet Little Sixteen", a 1958 Chuck Berry song
- "Sweet Sixteen and Never Been Kissed", a 1932 Blue Mountaineers song
