= Edith Frost (EP) =

EP by Edith Frost
- Released: June 17, 1996
- Genre: Alt-country
- Length: 13:10
- Label: Drag City

Edith Frost chronology
Edith Frost (1996)	Ancestors (1997)

Professional ratings
Review scores
Source	Rating
AllMusic	3/5 stars

Edith Frost is the eponymously-titled first EP by Edith Frost, released on June 17, 1996 through Drag City.

== Track listing ==
All tracks are written by Edith Frost.

No.	Title	Length
1.	"Evangeline"	2:50
2.	"Blame You"	3:28
3.	"My God Insane"	3:22
4.	"Waiting Room"	3:30

== Personnel ==
- Edith Frost – vocals, guitar
- Bill Neubauer – guitar on "My God Insane"
