= Introducing the Howling Hex =

Studio album by The Howling Hex
- Released: November 4, 2003
- Genre: Rock
- Label: Drag City

The Howling Hex chronology
Neil Michael Hagerty & the Howling Hex (2003)	Introducing the Howling Hex (2003)	Section 2 (2004)

Introducing the Howling Hex is an album by The Howling Hex. It was released as an LP by Drag City in 2003.

== Track listing ==
All songs written by the Howling Hex

=== Side one ===
1. "Centerville Springs"
2. "If You Can't Tell the Difference, Why Pay Less?"
3. "Slapshot!"

=== Side two ===
1. "Catalytic Convert"
2. "Be the Last to Stay in a Haunted House and You Will Inherit 50 Million $$"
3. "Fatter Than Anything"
4. "The Preserve, the Common"
