= Calling Over Time =

Studio album by Edith Frost
- Released: April 22, 1997
- Genre: Alt-country
- Length: 37:58
- Label: Drag City
- Producer: Rian Murphy

Edith Frost chronology
Ancestors (1997)	Calling Over Time (1997)	Telescopic (1998)

Professional ratings
Review scores
Source	Rating
AllMusic	4.5/5 stars
The Austin Chronicle	3/4 stars
Chicago Tribune	3.5/4 stars

Calling Over Time is the debut album of Edith Frost, released in 1997 through Drag City.

== Critical reception ==
The Chicago Tribune wrote that "the wistful title song unfurls in a beautifully coiling melody while 'Too Happy' incorporates a surprisingly light, almost jazzy tempo and a buoyantly extroverted tune." CMJ New Music Report wrote that Frost's "voice is so enticing that the listener is left with little choice but to listen again; it's then that Calling Over Time reveals itself." Pitchfork called the album "a stark, haunting character study that captures where Americana was headed at the turn of the century ... one of the decade’s most captivating debuts."

== Track listing ==
All tracks are written by Edith Frost.

No.	Title	Length
1.	"Temporary Loan"	4:44
2.	"Follow"	3:42
3.	"Calling Over Time"	3:10
4.	"Denied"	3:20
5.	"Pony Song"	3:42
6.	"Too Happy"	3:24
7.	"Wash of Water"	3:33
8.	"Shadows"	2:44
9.	"Thine Eyes"	3:52
10.	"Give Up Your Love"	2:45
11.	"Albany Blues"	3:02

== Personnel ==
- Chuck Cors – photography
- Edith Frost – vocals, guitar
- David Grubbs – guitar
- Rian Murphy – drums, production
- Sean O'Hagan – synthesizer
- Jim O'Rourke – guitar, mixing, recording
- Rick Rizzo – guitar
