= Robert Archibald =

Scottish basketball player (1980–2020)

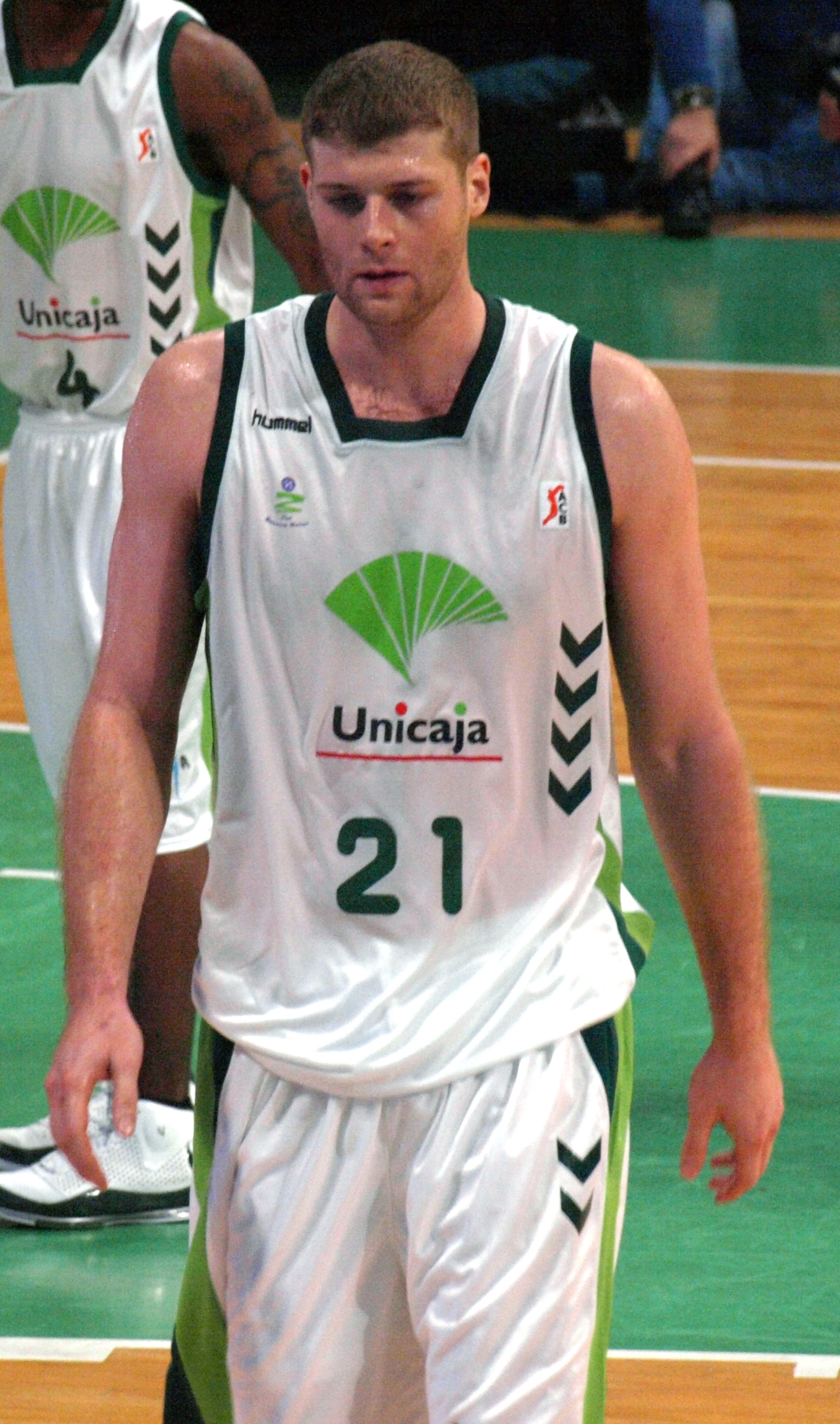
- Archibald in 2009

Personal information
- Born: 29 March 1980 Paisley, Renfrewshire, Scotland
- Died: 23 January 2020 (aged 39) Barrington, Illinois, U.S.
- Listed height: 6 ft 11 in (2.11 m)
- Listed weight: 250 lb (113 kg)

Career information
- High school: Queen Anne (Dunfermline, Scotland); Lafayette (Wildwood, Missouri)
- College: Illinois (1998–2002)
- NBA draft: 2002: 2nd round, 32nd overall pick
- Drafted by: Memphis Grizzlies
- Playing career: 2002–2012
- Position: Power forward / center
- Number: 21, 34

Career history
- 2002–2003: Memphis Grizzlies
- 2003: Phoenix Suns
- 2003–2004: Orlando Magic
- 2004: Toronto Raptors
- 2004: Valencia
- 2004–2005: Scavolini Pesaro
- 2005–2007: Joventut Badalona
- 2007–2008: Azovmash Mariupol
- 2008–2011: Unicaja Málaga
- 2011–2012: CAI Zaragoza

Career highlights
- FIBA EuroCup champion (2006); Ukrainian SuperLeague champion (2008); Ukrainian SuperLeague Finals MVP (2008); Ukrainian Cup winner (2008)
- Stats at NBA.com
- Stats at Basketball Reference

Robert Michael Archibald (29 March 1980 – 23 January 2020) was a Scottish professional basketball player. A power forward or center nicknamed "The Flying Scotsman" and billed at 6 ft 11 in (2.11 m), he was drafted 32nd overall by the Memphis Grizzlies from the University of Illinois in 2002.

== Early life and high school ==
Archibald was born in Paisley, Renfrewshire and raised in Kirkliston, then Dunfermline. His father Robert Sr., or Bobby, played for Murray BC in Scotland and was capped over 90 times for the Scotland and Great Britain national teams. Robert himself did not pick up a ball in earnest until he was 14. Afterwards, he began his career at local side Dunfermline Reign, playing at under-16, under-18 and under-21 levels concurrently. By his mid-teens, he was also representing Scotland at junior level before moving to the U.S. in September 1997 and graduating from Lafayette High School in 1998 alongside MLB player Ryan Howard.

== College career ==
In summer 1998, Archibald committed to the University of Illinois. He played 32 games, starting 8, and averaged almost 15 minutes per game as a freshman, while his sophomore year ended with 30 appearances, among them 20 starts.

In his junior year, Archibald started only two games, yet averaged more minutes, points, rebounds and blocks than the previous season. Then, as a senior, he started in almost every game and again increased his output across the board, averaging double digits in scoring and added 5+ rebounds per game in only 22 minutes to help the Fighting Illini to a Sweet 16 appearance. He also collected more fouls than any other player in the Big Ten that year. Under Bill Self, Illinois won the Big Ten Conference in both Archibald's junior and senior years.

== Professional career ==
=== NBA ===
In 2002, Robert was drafted by the Memphis Grizzlies, selected in the second round of the NBA Draft, the third pick of the round, 32nd overall, becoming the first, and to this day the only, Scotsman to play in the NBA.

After drafting him in the second round, the Grizzlies signed Archibald to a 2-year contract. After one season with the team, in which he played only 12 games, Archibald was traded with Brevin Knight and Cezary Trybański to the Phoenix Suns in exchange for Bo Outlaw and Jake Tsakalidis. On 26 December 2003 Archibald was traded again, this time to the Orlando Magic. A week later he was traded, for the third time that season, to the Toronto Raptors in exchange for Mengke Bateer and Remon van de Hare. He played 30 games with the Raptors. Archibald's final NBA game was on April 9, 2004, in a 66–74 loss to the Detroit Pistons where he recorded four rebounds but no points. He holds NBA career averages of 1.2 points and 1.6 rebounds per game.

=== Europe ===
Archibald played four seasons in the Euroleague with Scavolini Pesaro, Joventut Badalona and two seasons with Unicaja Málaga. In July 2011 he signed a one-year contract with CAI Zaragoza. Archibald retired after the 2012 Summer Olympics in which he represented Great Britain.

=== International ===
Archibald represented the Scottish national basketball team at junior level. He joined the Great Britain national team as it formed in 2007. He represented Great Britain 46 times including EuroBasket 2009, EuroBasket 2011, and at the 2012 Summer Olympics.

== Death ==
Archibald died of suicide by gunshot at age 39 at his home in Barrington, Illinois. According to his father, he suffered from depression and was going through a protracted divorce.

== Career statistics ==
Legend
GP	Games played	GS	Games started	MPG	Minutes per game
FG%	Field goal percentage	3P%	3-point field goal percentage	FT%	Free throw percentage
RPG	Rebounds per game	APG	Assists per game	SPG	Steals per game
BPG	Blocks per game	PPG	Points per game	**Bold**	Career high

=== NBA ===
==== Regular season ====
Year	Team	GP	GS	MPG	FG%	3P%	FT%	RPG	APG	SPG	BPG	PPG
2002–03	Memphis	12	0	6.0	.300	–	.389	1.4	0.3	0.0	**0.3**	1.6
2003–04	Phoenix	1	0	6.0	.000	–	**.500**	1.0	**1.0**	0.0	0.0	1.0
2003–04	Orlando	1	0	4.0	**.500**	–	.000	1.0	0.0	**1.0**	0.0	**2.0**
2003–04	Toronto	**30**	**3**	**8.2**	.267	–	.481	**1.7**	0.4	0.4	0.1	1.0
Career		44	3	7.5	.283	–	.429	1.6	0.4	0.3	0.1	1.2
