= You Can't Beat Tomorrow =

Studio album by The Howling Hex
- Released: November 15, 2005
- Genre: Rock
- Length: 28:54 (CD); 34:30 (DVD)
- Label: Drag City

The Howling Hex chronology
All-Night Fox (2005)	You Can't Beat Tomorrow (2005)	1-2-3 (2006)

Professional ratings
Review scores
Source	Rating
AllMusic	4/5 stars
Mojo	4/5 stars
Pitchfork Media	(6.9/10)
PopMatters	(6/10)

You Can't Beat Tomorrow is the fifth album by the Howling Hex. It was released as a CD and DVD by Drag City in 2005.

== Track listing ==
1. "Teenage Doors" – 1:58
2. "Cobra Heart" – 2:30
3. "Apache Energy Plan" – 3:04
4. "S.C. Coward" – 2:58
5. "Sick & Old 1" – 2:54
6. "Diamond Tank" – 2:37
7. "You Can't Beat Tomorrow" – 2:17
8. "Meet Me at the Dance" – 3:57
9. "Sick & Old 2" – 1:39
10. "No Numbers" – 5:04

=== DVD ===
- You Can't Beat Tomorrow: The Howling Hex Variety Show – 34:30
