= Sweet Sixteen (Royal Trux album) =

Studio album by Royal Trux
- Released: February 11, 1997
- Genre: Rock
- Length: 58:51
- Label: Virgin

Royal Trux chronology
Thank You (1995)	Sweet Sixteen (1997)	Singles, Live, Unreleased (1997)

Sweet Sixteen is an album by Royal Trux, released in 1997. It is their only album not yet released as a vinyl LP. The album is the second of the band's trilogy paying homage to the music of the 1960s, 1970s, and 1980s.

Virgin Records was so upset with the album that it paid Royal Trux around $300,000 in order to terminate their recording contract.

== Critical reception ==
Professional ratings
Review scores
Source	Rating
AllMusic	3/5 stars
Chicago Tribune	2/4 stars
The Encyclopedia of Popular Music	3/5 stars
MusicHound Rock: The Essential Album Guide	2/5 stars
NME	4/10
Rolling Stone	1/5 stars
Spin	6/10

Spin described the album as "lots of '70s dirtbag boogie, guitar noodling, and barroom jamathons." Trouser Press wrote: "A compromise between the (relatively) straight-ahead rock structures of their Virgin debut and the mayhem preceding it, Sweet Sixteen still reveals moments of genius embedded in the mess of guitars, death-rattle vocals and tortured synthesizers." The Chicago Reader wrote that Sweet Sixteen is "as grossly unlistenable as Twin Infinitives but lacks that album's surreal queerness, with the gruesome twosome and this year's rhythm section spitting up half-baked boogie tunes that all seem to break down." Entertainment Weekly called the album "seriously warped, ’70s-style stoner rock."

== Track listing ==
All tracks are written by Neil Hagerty and Jennifer Herrema.

No.	Title	Length
1.	"Don't Try Too Hard"	4:09
2.	"Morphic Resident"	4:50
3.	"The Pickup"	5:24
4.	"Cold Joint"	4:58
5.	"Golden Rules"	4:13
6.	"You'll Be Staying in Room 323"	4:15
7.	"Can't Have It Both Ways"	4:39
8.	"10 Days 12 Nights"	4:21
9.	"Microwave Made"	4:54
10.	"Sweet Sixteen"	4:37
11.	"I'm Looking Through You"	4:15
12.	"Roswell Seeds and Stems"	4:03
13.	"Pol Pot Pie"	4:16
