= White Stuff =

White stuff may refer to:

- White Stuff Clothing, a retail chain
- White Stuff (album), a 2019 album by Royal Trux
- "The White Stuff", a 1992 song by Weird Al Yankovic from Off the Deep End
