= Desmadrados Soldados de Ventura =

Psychedelic music ensemble

- Origin: Manchester, United Kingdom
- Genres: Psychedelic rock
- Years active: 2012–present
- Label: Golden Lab
- Members: David Birchall; Andrew Cheetham; Mike Griffin; Eric Hardiman; Dylan Hughes; Nick Mitchell; Edwin Stevens; Otto Willberg
- Website: www.goldenlabrecords.com

Desmadrados Soldados de Ventura is a psychedelic music ensemble formed in Manchester. It features an ever-rotating line-up of musicians who share an admiration for Santana, Royal Trux, Boredoms, Vermonster, Glenn Branca and Funkadelic. The most consistent members between releases have been drummer Andrew Cheetham and guitarists Nick Mitchell and Edwin Stevens. Since 2013, the band have released six full-length studio albums with Golden Lab Records.

== History ==
Desmadrados Soldados de Ventura was founded in late April 2012. Guitarist Nick Mitchell, who had just returned to the US, wanted to assemble a group of players who shared his affection for classic jam bands such as The Allman Brothers Band and Grateful Dead as well as more abrasive music, such as Throbbing Gristle and Cabaret Voltaire. In addition to Mitchell, the first line-up comprised musicians Anthony Joinson, Ros Murray, Edwin Stevens, Kate Armitage, Zak Hane, Tom Settle, Jon Collin. They played their first show on 2 August 2012 at the Night and Day Cafe in Manchester. The band debuted with a cassette titled Desmadrados Soldados de Ventura, released by Feathered Coyote in October 2012.

Interpenetrating Dimensional Express was released in 2014 and subject to some critical acclaim. David Keenan of The Wire compared the band favorably Albert Ayler's New York Eye and Ear Control group, saying "at points you can feel them nodding toward the kind of rock dinosaur-ism that has yet to enjoy underground rehabilitation – Lotus-era Santana, for one – and it’s all the more thrilling for it, with the group straddling pre- and post-noise strategies without any of the guilt or militancy of the tabletop noise crew." The band recorded and released a two-part album in 2015, titled Clifton Park, NY, Vol. 1 and Clifton Park, NY, Vol. 2. The Wire praised the band and its feedback-laden sound in a November 2015 issue, saying "the act is intensely invigorating, but there’s also something spiritual at work that has a life of its own – a surge of raw power that only the guitarist can control."

== Discography ==
Studio albums

- Desmadrados Soldados de Ventura (Golden Lab, 2012)
- Striiide (Deep Distance, 2013)
- Interpenetrating Dimensional Express (Golden Lab, 2014)
- The Empire Never Ended (Golden Lab, 2014)
- Clifton Park, NY, Vol. 1 (Golden Lab, 2015)
- Clifton Park, NY, Vol. 2 (Golden Lab, 2015)
- The Grand Celestial Purge (Golden Lab, 2016)

Extended plays

- Desmadrados Soldados de Ventura (Feathered Coyote, 2012)

Live albums

- Dieter Dierks Jerks (Golden Lab, 2014)
- Thinkin' Game (self-released, 2014)
