= Pound for Pound =

Pound for Pound may refer to:

- Pound for pound, a ranking used in combat sports of who the better fighters are irrespective of their weight
- Pound for Pound (Anvil album), 1988
- Pound for Pound (Royal Trux album), 2000
