= Striiide =

Studio album by Desmadrados Soldados de Ventura
- Released: 1 October 2013
- Recorded: 2 September 2012
- Studio: Sunshine Studios, Manchester
- Genre: Psychedelic rock
- Length: 37:17
- Label: Deep Distance

Desmadrados Soldados de Ventura chronology
Desmadrados Soldados de Ventura (2012)	Striiide (2013)	Interpenetrating Dimensional Express (2014)

Striiide is the second studio album by Desmadrados Soldados de Ventura, released on 1 October 2013 by Deep Distance. The cover art, illustrated by Rudy Rucker, made number twenty-five out of thirty on Tiny Mix Tapes' album covers of the year list.

== Track listing ==
Side one
No.	Title	Length
1.	"Sunshine Assembly"	20:43

Side two
No.	Title	Length
1.	"1999 RE70"	16:34

== Personnel ==
Adapted from the Striiide liner notes.

Desmadrados Soldados de Ventura

- Kate Armitage – vocals
- Andrew Cheetham – drums
- Zak Hane – bass guitar
- Tim Horrocks – electric guitar
- Anthony Joinson – bass guitar
- Nick Mitchell – electric guitar
- Ros Murray – electric guitar

Production and additional personnel

- Patrick Crane – recording
- Rudy Rucker – cover art, illustrations

== Release history ==
Region	Date	Label	Format	Catalog
United Kingdom	2013	Deep Distance	LP	DD08
