= The Empire Never Ended =

Studio album by Desmadrados Soldados de Ventura
- Released: December 2014
- Genre: Psychedelic rock
- Length: 19:38
- Label: Golden Lab

Desmadrados Soldados de Ventura chronology
Dieter Dierks Jerks (2014)	The Empire Never Ended (2014)	Clifton Park, NY, Vol. 1 (2015)

The Empire Never Ended is the fourth full-length studio album by Desmadrados Soldados de Ventura, released in November 2014 by Golden Lab Records.

== Track listing ==
Side one
No.	Title	Length
1.	"[untitled]"	10:03

Side two
No.	Title	Length
1.	"[untitled]"	9:35

== Personnel ==
Adapted from The Empire Never Ended liner notes.

Desmadrados Soldados de Ventura

- David Birchall – bass guitar
- Andrew Cheetham – drums
- Dylan Hughes – electric guitar
- Nick Mitchell – electric guitar
- Alex Pierce – congas
- Tom Settle – electric guitar
- Edwin Stevens – electric guitar

Production and additional personnel

- Patrick Crane – recording

== Release history ==
Region	Date	Label	Format	Catalog
United Kingdom	2014	Golden Lab	LP	ROWF 45
