= Dieter Dierks Jerks =

Live album by Desmadrados Soldados de Ventura
- Released: 28 April 2014
- Recorded: 17 January 2014
- Studio: Dulcimer, Chorlton, Manchester
- Genre: Psychedelic rock
- Length: 30:53
- Label: Golden Lab

Desmadrados Soldados de Ventura chronology
Interpenetrating Dimensional Express (2014)	Dieter Dierks Jerks (2014)	The Empire Never Ended (2014)

Dieter Dierks Jerks is a live album by Desmadrados Soldados de Ventura, released on 28 April 2014 by Golden Lab Records.

== Track listing ==
Side one
No.	Title	Length
1.	"[untitled]"	15:34

Side two
No.	Title	Length
1.	"[untitled]"	15:19

== Personnel ==
Adapted from the Dieter Dierks Jerks liner notes.

Desmadrados Soldados de Ventura

- Kate Armitage – vocals, steel drum
- Andrew Cheetham – drums
- Zak Hane – bass guitar
- Dylan Hughes – electric guitar
- Anthony Joinson – bass guitar
- Nick Mitchell – electric guitar
- Tom Settle – electric guitar
- Edwin Stevens – electric guitar

Production and additional personnel

- Alex Humphreys – cover art, illustrations
- Phil Todd – recording

== Release history ==
Region	Date	Label	Format	Catalog
United Kingdom	2014	Golden Lab	LP	ROWF 43
