= Clifton Park, NY, Vol. 1 =

Studio album by Desmadrados Soldados de Ventura
- Released: 5 July 2015
- Recorded: April 2015
- Studios: Parashi's basement, Clifton Park, NY
- Genre: Psychedelic rock
- Length: 49:33
- Label: Golden Lab

Desmadrados Soldados de Ventura chronology
The Empire Never Ended (2015)	Clifton Park, NY, Vol. 1 (2015)	Clifton Park, NY, Vol. 2 (2015)

Clifton Park, NY, Vol. 1 is the fifth studio album and first part of the Clifton Park, NY double album by Desmadrados Soldados de Ventura, released on 5 July 2015 by Golden Lab Records. Edwin Pouncey of The Wire drew favorable comparisons to the music of Glenn Branca and The Velvet Underground's "Sister Ray", saying "the music here sounds like a celebration of being alive and totally absorbed in the process of creation."

== Track listing ==
Side one
No.	Title	Length
1.	"[untitled]"	23:47

Side two
No.	Title	Length
1.	"[untitled]"	25:46

== Personnel ==
Adapted from the Clifton Park, NY, Vol. 1 liner notes.

Desmadrados Soldados de Ventura

- David Birchall – electric guitar
- Andrew Cheetham – drums
- Mike Griffin – electric guitar
- Eric Hardiman – electric guitar
- Dylan Hughes – electric guitar
- Nick Mitchell – electric guitar
- Edwin Stevens – electric guitar
- Otto Willberg – bass guitar

Production and additional personnel

- John Moloney – cover art, illustrations

== Release history ==
Region	Date	Label	Format	Catalog
United Kingdom	2015	Golden Lab	LP	ROWF 65
