= Ancestors (EP) =

EP by Edith Frost
- Released: 1997
- Recorded: January 21, 1996
- Studio: Noise New Jersey
- Genre: Alt-country
- Label: Island, Trade 2
- Producer: Edith Frost, Kramer

Edith Frost chronology
Edith Frost (1996)	Ancestors (1997)	Calling Over Time (1997)

Professional ratings
Review scores
Source	Rating
Allmusic	4/5 stars

Ancestors is an EP by Edith Frost, released in 1997 through Island Records and Trade 2.

== Track listing ==
All tracks are written by Edith Frost.

No.	Title	Length
1.	"Ancestors"
2.	"Secrets"
3.	"Cold and on My Mind"

== Personnel ==
- Edith Frost – vocals, guitar, production
- Kramer – bass guitar, synthesizer, production, engineering
- Deborah Moore – cover art
