= Woo (band) =

British musical duo

- Also known as: Woo, Woo Collective, Woo Music
- Origin: London, England
- Genres: Experimental, ambient, electronic, folk, jazz
- Years active: 1975–present
- Labels: Palto Flats Records, Slow Boys Records, Quindi Records
- Members: Mark Ives; Clive Ives

Woo is an experimental music duo from the UK. The band consists of brothers Mark (born in 1953) and Clive Ives (born in 1956). They grew up in the South of London.

The band combine several musical styles, creating its own sound: Folk, Jazz, Pop, Ambient, Psychedelic as well as Healing Music. Woo is one of the first bands to incorporate acoustic instruments (clarinet, saxophone, Acoustic guitars, 12-string and bass guitars) into electronic music in the early 70's. Die Zeit wrote of them "ihre Musik ist so etwas wie ein offenes Geheimnis. Seit Jahrzehnten blüht sie in einem entlegenen, verwunschenen Garten" [their music is like an open secret. For decades it has been flowering in a remote, enchanted garden].

The name of the band, Woo, refers to the sound of a musical saw, an instrument the brothers' uncle Fred used to play.

== Biography ==
=== Early life (1965-1974) ===
The Ives brothers grow up in the South of London in Raynes Park before moving to Banstead. Their interest in music started with seeing The Beatles on TV in the 1960s. The Ives brothers founded their first band, The Tescades, at ages 6 and 9, with two childhood friends. Mark was on the guitar and Clive played an old drum kit belonging to his grandfather. The Tescades put on gigs in the garage of their house, and invited their friends to be the audience.

Their grandfather, a drummer in the Royal Marines, and their uncle Ivor, a Jazz musician, played an instrumental role in the musical development of the Ives brothers. Mark played at several Modern Jazz and Dixieland Jazz gigs with his uncle Ivor. The latter also gave Mark his first clarinet at the age of 15.

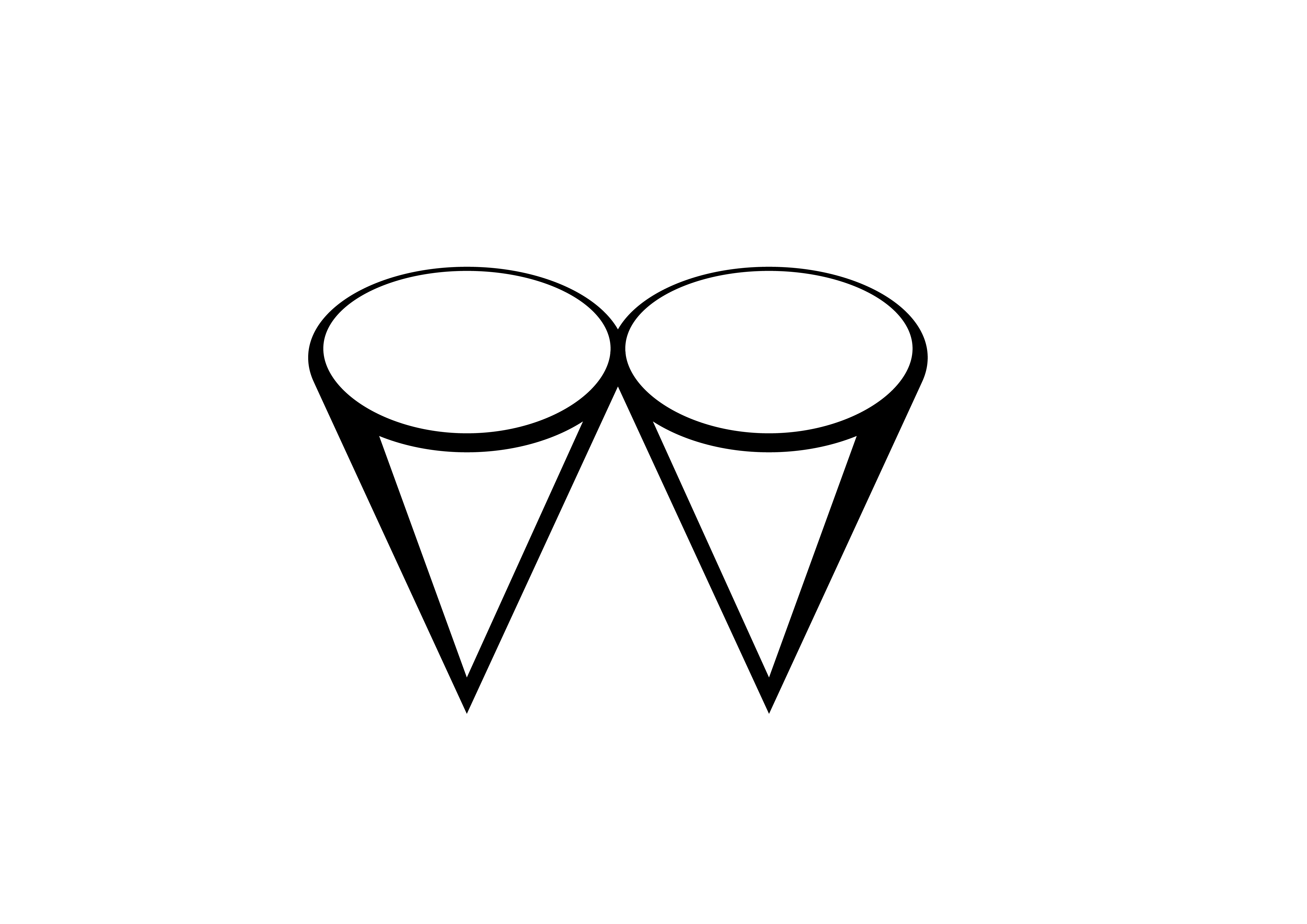
Woo Logo

Mark started to learn to play the guitar and to write songs at the age of 13. During these early years, the Ives brothers rehearsed Mark’s new compositions. Clive was impressed by the talent of his older brother and tried to back him up with a variety of creative tools. He used kitchen utensils as percussion instruments.

At 17, Mark joined a Royal Air Force band, and played clarinet. Meanwhile, Clive began to study art.

The two brothers started recording when Mark left the RAF.

=== First recordings and first album (1974-1982) ===
In 1974, the Ives brothers bought their first synthesizer, the SH-3A by Roland, and a Teac 4-track tape recorder. The duo started to explore composing and home-studio recording. The Ives brothers met several nights a week in a small flat and recorded throughout the night. Clive was on synthesizer and percussions, Mark was on bass guitar, 12-string guitar, saxophone and clarinet. The material of the first recordings are based mainly on Mark's ideas and compositions.

Mark dictated notes and chords to Clive and the band left the recorder on, hence comments from each other and background noises became part of the songs. As they recorded at night, they had to keep the volume down in order not to disturb the neighbours who banged on the walls to complain. This affected the sound of the band: they were forced to record very quiet tracks with soft sounds. Triangles were used instead of drums, guitars were played in picking mode and keyboards were played in a delicate way.

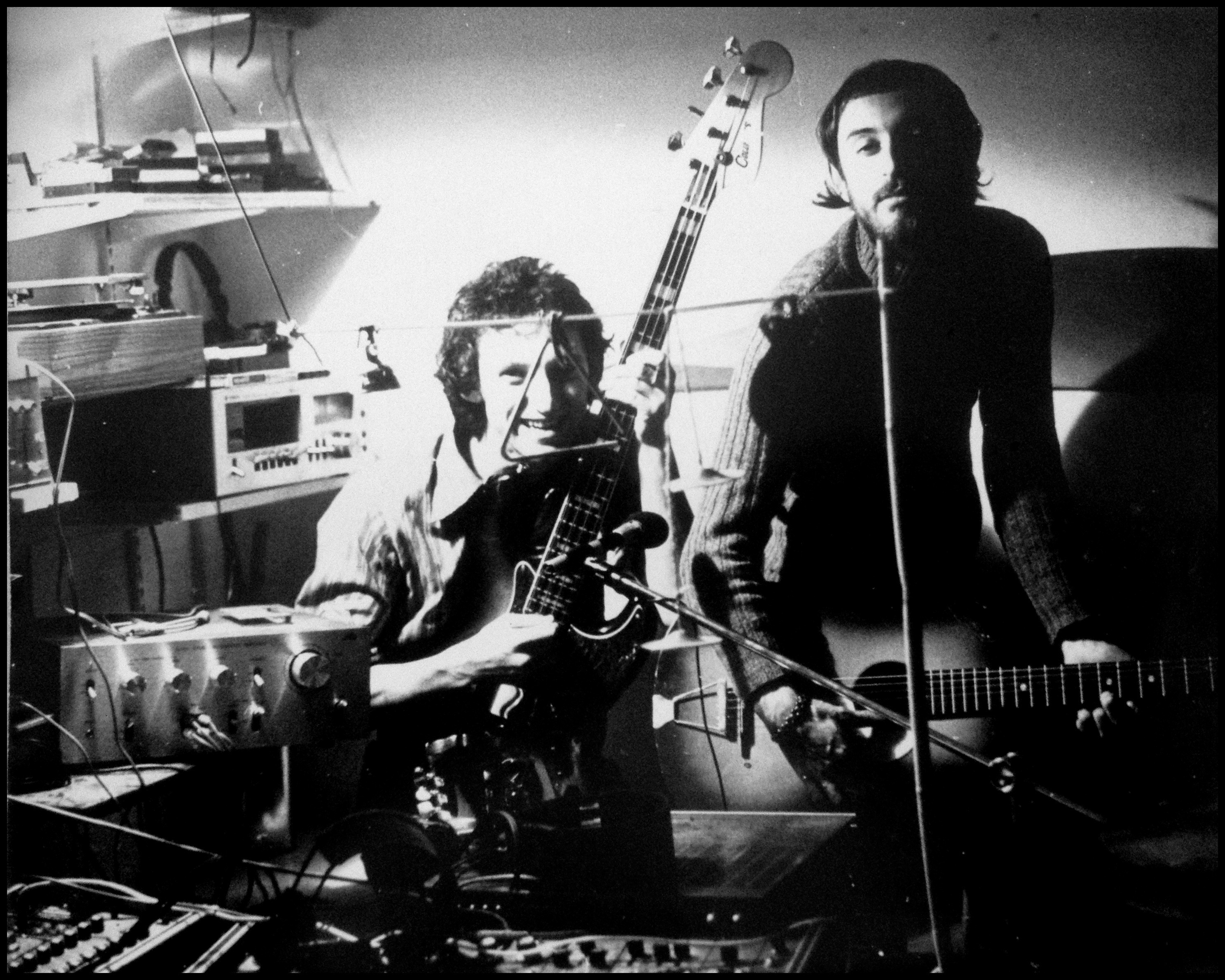
Mark And Clive Ives in their home studio in the early 1980s.

In 1976, the band acquired a new synthesizer, the Roland system 100. It featured a sequencer that propelled the sound of the band to another dimension. Clive realised that the audio signal of Mark's acoustic instruments could be delivered directly to the synthesizer and its sequencer. He manipulated Mark’s playing with the help of oscillators and processors integrated in the synthesizer. Experimenting with this new technology offered the Ives brothers a new way to record their music.

"After our initial thrill of the wonders of recording we began to realize that with this technology at our fingertips, we could create beauty. Organic, unpredictable, mysterious things would happen when we allowed the technology to be set free, especially when Mark’s instruments were being treated through the sequencers and synths. Sometimes 1 and 1 made 3, and we were in creative heaven. From there the mind enters into the equation, and starts to envisage endless sounds upon sounds, combining musical influences and making them into something new …”

Clive Ives on the new approach of recording by the band. Woo tried to translate their different emotional states spontaneously and composes pieces that could evoke dream-like atmospheres, for example - Parisian cafés, Russian music and imaginary landscapes. This gave the music of the band different styles and sounds. Woo recorded hundreds of tunes over a period of five years. In 1981, an old school friend of Clive, who had become an artist manager, submitted the music of the band to Mike Alway at Cherry Red Records. Alway supported them to release an album under Woo’s Sunshine Series label.

In 1982, during the new wave and punk era, Woo released their first album, Whichever Way You Are Going You Are Going Wrong, with 10 instrumental tracks and one song sung by Mark. It was mixed by Clive, who also designed the LP cover.

The album was well-received by the English musical press, in particular Melody Maker and NME, which described the music of the Ives brothers as a collaboration between the Durutti Column and Penguin Cafe Orchestra, produced by Brian Eno.

=== Next three albums (1982-1991) ===
Free and under no contract, the band kept building its musical career, recording more and more tracks for a total of 1500 tracks over ten years. The Ives brothers became interested in Rāja yoga and spiritual healing. Mark studied theosophy and Krishna consciousness, while Clive started practicing Shiatsu in parallel with their musical creations. Their spiritual interests had an effect on Woo's music.

In 1987, the US label Independent Projects Records re-released Whichever Way You Are Going You Are Going Wrong. In 1989, It's Cosy Inside, which Woo first recorded in 1983, was released in the US as well as in Europe; this gave the band the opportunity to get some exposure on the other side of the Atlantic.

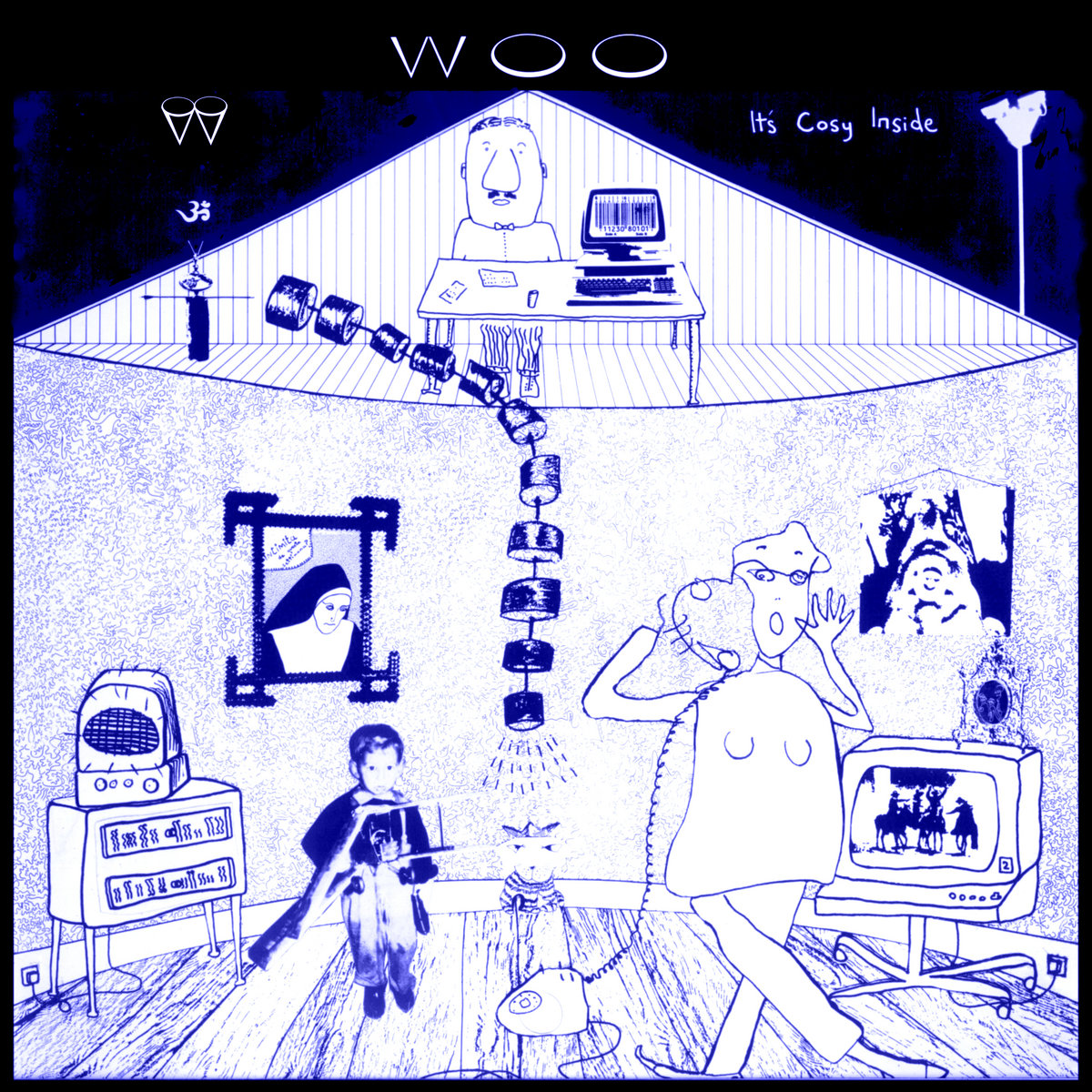
Woo - It's Cosy Inside

At this point the band's musical style had evolved significantly. The resulting album was influenced by George Orwell's novel 1984.

"When we were recording, 1982-1983 we were living the suburban post-apocalyptic vision. The track "BB…..!" refers to the chant for Big Brother in 1984. CCT cameras had just been erected around the corner from where we were living and it felt like Big Brother was on his way! I photographed them and collaged them onto the top right corner of the album cover. The song "The Final Card" — also symbolised by the bar codes on the computer screen on the album cover — is a reference to identity tagging, where all our identity and finances are kept in an implanted under your skin. With Orwell’s vision looming towards us, the fear of nuclear war, conspiracy theories of the Illuminati, the apparent demise of the Love Generation — and with that loss, the reaction to the increasing awareness of all that is wrong in the world manifesting in suburban London with anarchy and Punk — and the increasing gulf between rich and poor with the Thatcher Government ... Yeah, we were buying into an apocalyptic vision."

- Clive Ives on the inspiration for the album "It's Cosy Inside"

"It's Cosy Inside" did not have the same commercial success as their debut album.

=== 1990s ===
Woo left its US label, and signed its next album with the label Cloud 9 Music. The third Woo album, Into The Heart Of Love, was issued in 1990 (on cassette only).

In 1991, the band released their third album in three years, A La Luna, on Grunki Records.

In 1995, the band published a new album with 7 tracks, Live from Venus.

Also in 1995, Woo issued Forever Healing, the band's first foray into the world of "healing music".

=== 2010s ===
The band's second album, It's Cosy Inside, was re-issued in 2012 by Drag City and Yoga Records. In 2013, Whichever Way You Are Going You Are Going Wrong, Woo's first album, was re-issued by Emotional Rescue.

When the Past Arrives, a new album based on the band's archives from 1974 to 1990, was released on Drag City / Yoga Records in 2014. Pitchfork gave it 7.7 out of 10.

The same year, Woo was commissioned by the English Touring Opera to compose an opera for children, Waxwings. The work was created for the ETO tour of 2015.

In 2014, Into the Heart of Love was the next album to be reissued.

In 2016, Woo released a new album, AWAAWAA, with tracks from its archives, published by Palto Flats Records.

Emotional Rescue re-issued A La Luna in 2017.

Since 2016, Woo have continued to release new albums on their Bandcamp page, including All Is Well which came out as an LP in 2019, released by Slowboy Records, and contained 13 tracks, combining both instrumental titles and songs.

In June 2020, Woo released a new album, Arcturian Corridor, on Quindi Records.

== Influences ==
The bands cites as main influences: Claude Debussy, Erik Satie, Yes, Todd Rundgren, The Beatles, Stevie Wonder, David Bowie, Brian Eno, Frank Zappa, Sergei Prokofiev, Stan Getz and Lionel Hampton.

== Members ==
- Mark Ives : Guitar, clarinet, bass guitar, vocals, composition
- Clive Ives : Synthesiser, percussion, keyboard programming, composition

== Discography ==
- 1982: Whichever You Are Going You Are Going Wrong
- 1989: It's Cosy Inside
- 1990: Into The Heart Of Love
- 1991: A La Luna
- 1995: Live From Venus
- 1995: Forever Healing
- 2012: When The Past Arrives
- 2013: Christmas Presence
- 2014: Please Remember To Breathe, with Ruby
- 2014: Light Of The World, with Ruby
- 2015: Waxwings, with The English Touring Opera
- 2015: Ruby's Pastlives
- 2015: Planning For A Miracle
- 2015: Ayla's Legacy with Freida Mai
- 2015: Starlight
- 2016: AWAAWAA
- 2016: Dobbin's Lost His Coconuts
- 2016: ROBOT X
- 2016: Woo Romantics
- 2016: How to Make Your Home Look Like Space
- 2017: When My Loves Goes Away
- 2017: A Dream
- 2017: Xylophonics
- 2018: Another Place Another Time
- 2018: Covers
- 2019: All Is Well
- 2020: Arcturian Corridor
- 2021: Play The Blues
- 2022: Paradise In Pimlico
- 2025: M = C
