= List of British bingo nicknames =

Argot for numerals in gambling

In the game of bingo in the United Kingdom, callers announcing the numbers have traditionally used some nicknames to refer to particular numbers if they are drawn. The nicknames are sometimes known by the rhyming phrase 'bingo lingo', and there are rhymes for each number from 1 to 90, some of which date back to 1900. Some traditional games went up to 100. In some clubs, the 'bingo caller' will say the number, with the assembled players intoning the rhyme in a call and response manner, in others, the caller will say the rhyme and the players chant the number. One purpose of the nicknames is to allow called numbers to be clearly understood in a noisy environment. In 2003, Butlins holiday camps introduced some more modern calls devised by a professor of popular culture in an attempt to bring fresh interest to bingo.

== Calls ==
Number	Nickname	Explanation
1	"Kelly's eye"	the pun is military slang; possibly a reference to Ned Kelly, from Ned Kelly's helmet, the eye slot resembling the number 1
1	"Little Jimmy"	one of the oldest bingo calls, first recorded in an article about troops bound for the Boer War in 1900; military slang from the Navy term for the first lieutenant known as "Jimmy the One"
1	"Kelly's wonk"	rare anecdotal nickname linked to the idea of a one-eyed Kelly
1	"buttered scone"	Cockney rhyming slang
2	"one little duck"	from the resemblance of the number 2 to a duck (see also "22"); response is a single "quack"
2	"me an' you"	Cockney rhyming slang for "me and you", which is also a lingo call
2	"Doctor Who"	from the British sci-fi TV programme
3	"cup of tea"	rhymes with "three"
3	"you an' me"	Cockney rhyming slang for "you and me"
3	"up a tree"	Cockney rhyming slang
4	"knock at the door"	Cockney rhyming slang; one possible origin is the nursery rhyme "One, Two, Buckle My Shoe" response "Three, Four, Knock at the Door"
4	"door to door"	Cockney rhyming slang
5	"man alive"	rhymes with "five"
5	"Jack alive"	Cockney rhyming slang
5	"dead alive"	Cockney rhyming slang
6	"half a dozen"	a common phrase meaning six units (see "12" below)
6	"Tom Mix"	Cockney rhyming slang; mix was one of Hollywood's first Western stars and helped define the genre as it emerged in the early days of the cinema
6	"choppin' sticks"	Cockney rhyming slang
6	"chopsticks"	Cockney rhyming slang
7	"lucky"	7 is considered a lucky number in some cultures; see also "73"
7	"Gawd's in 'eaven"	Cockney rhyming slang for "God's in Heaven"
8	"garden gate"	rhymes with "eight"
8	"one fat lady"	from the resemblance of the number 8 to an overweight woman; see also "88"
8	"'arry Tate"	Cockney rhyming slang for "Harry Tate", the music hall and variety show comedian
9	"doctor's orders"	number 9 was a laxative pill given out by army doctors in WWI; players may respond with "Cough, cough!"
10	"Andy's den"	refers to Andy Burnham, the current incumbent of 10 Downing Street, the official residence of the prime minister of the United Kingdom; the call changes with each new prime minister – first noted use was "Macmillan's Den" in the early 1960s
10	"cock(s) an' 'en"	Cockney rhyming slang for "cock and hen" or "cocks and hen"
10	"Dahnin' Street"	Cockney rhyming slang for "Downing Street", which is also a lingo term
11	"legs eleven"	first referenced in WWI, it was Aussie slang for a tall, thin man, and the nickname of the 11th Battalion, Australian Imperial Force; also, during WWI, it was British slang for a tall officer with very thin legs often inappropriately deemed sexist and likened to chicken legs in its defence, players would wolf whistle in response, which could be deemed sexist and, in recent years, has seen players banned from bingo halls
12	"one dozen"	a reference to there being 12 units in one dozen
13	"unlucky for some"	a reference to 13 being an unlucky number
14	"Valentine's Day"	a reference to 14 February being St Valentine's Day
15	"young and keen"	rhymes with "fifteen"
16	"never been kissed"	after the song "Sweet Sixteen and Never Been Kissed"
16	"sweet 16"	refers to the US and Canadian celebrations of a sweet sixteen birthday
17	"Dancing Queen"	the song "Dancing Queen" by ABBA famously features the number in its lyrics
18	"coming of age"	eighteen is the age of majority in England, Wales and Northern Ireland
19	"goodbye, teens"	nineteen is the age after which a person stops being a teenager
20	"score"	20 units in a score
20	"getting plenty"	cheeky phrase; rhymes with "twenty"
21	"key of/to the door"	the traditional age of majority
21	"royal salute"	named after the traditional 21-gun salute
22	"ducks on the pond"	the numeral 22 resembles the profile of two ducks; response is often "quack, quack"
22	"two little ducks"	the numeral 22 resembles the profile of two ducks; response is often "quack, quack"
23	"The Lord is My Shepherd"	the first words of Psalm 23 of the Old Testament
23	"thee and me"	rhymes with "twenty-three"
24	"two dozen"	12 × 2 = 24; refer to 12, above
25	"duck and dive"	rhymes with "twenty-five", and is made up of a "2" – resembles a duck – and a "5" – resembles a reflected "2"
26	"half a crown"	pre-decimalised currency in the UK; see half crown – a half crown is equivalent to 2 shillings and sixpence, written 2/6 and pronounced "two and six"
26	"pick and mix"	rhymes with "twenty-six"
27	"duck and a crutch"	the number 2 looks like a duck (see "2") and the number 7 looks like a crutch
27	"gateway to heaven"	rhymes with "twenty-seven"
28	"in a state"	"two and eight" is rhyming slang for "state"
28	"overweight"	rhymes with "twenty-eight"
29	"rise and shine"	rhymes with "twenty-nine"
30	"Dirty Gertie"	common rhyme derived from the given name Gertrude, used as a nickname for the statue La Delivrance installed in North London in 1927; the usage was reinforced by "Dirty Gertie from Bizerte", a bawdy song sung by Allied soldiers in North Africa during the Second World War.
31	"get up and run"	rhymes with "thirty-one"
32	"buckle my shoe"	comes from the nursery rhyme "One, Two, Buckle My Shoe"
33	"dirty knee"	rhymes with "thirty-three"
33	"all the threes"	popular on the British TV show Bob's Full House, on which the audience and even Bob would respond with "Wogan's Knees," a reference to TV and radio presenter Terry Wogan
34	"ask for more"	rhymes with "thirty-four"
35	"jump and jive"	a dance step
36	"three dozen"	3 × 12 = 36; refer to 12, above
37	"more than 11"	rhymes with "thirty-seven"
38	"Christmas cake"	Cockney rhyming slang
39	"all the steps"	from The Thirty-Nine Steps, a 1915 adventure novel by John Buchan, and also several film adaptations
40	"life begins"	from the title of the 1932 self-help book by W. B. Pitkin, Life Begins at Forty
40	"naughty 40"	a common colloquialism for those at the start of their middle age
41	"time for fun"	rhymes with "forty-one"
42	"Winnie-the-Pooh"	rhymes with "forty-two", and in reference to Winnie-the-Pooh, a beloved UK children's book character
43	"down on your knees"	this was a phrase that was made popular during wartime by soldiers
44	"all the fours, droopy drawers"	rhyme that refers to sagging underwear
44	"all the fours, Diana Dors"	Diana Dors rhymes with "all the fours"
45	"halfway there"	being halfway towards 90
46	"up to tricks"	rhymes with "forty-six"
47	"four and seven"	refers to the two numbers that make up 47
48	"four dozen"	4 × 12 = 48; refer to 12, above
49	"PC"	refers to the BBC radio series The Adventures of PC 49; the usual response is "Evening, all"
50	"it's a bullseye!"	referring to the darts score
50	"5 – 0, 5 – 0, it's off to work we go"	refers to Snow White and the Seven Dwarfs
50	"half a century"	refers to 50 being half of 100
51	"tweak of the thumb"	rhymes with "fifty-one"
52	"Danny La Rue"	a reference to drag entertainer Danny La Rue; also used for other numbers ending in "2" (see "72", below)
52	"chicken vindaloo"	introduced by Butlins in 2003
52	"deck of cards"	number of cards in a pack
52	"weeks in a year"	number of weeks in a Gregorian year
53	"here comes Herbie!"	53 is the racing number of Herbie the VW Beetle; players may reply "beep beep!"
53	"stuck in the tree"	rhymes with "fifty-three"
54	"man at the door"	rhymes with "fifty-four"
54	"clean the floor"	rhymes with "fifty-four"
55	"all the fives"	55 is written as two fives
55	"snakes alive"	rhymes with "fifty-five" and the two fives also look like a pair of snakes sitting up
56	"Shotts bus"	refers to the former number of the bus from Glasgow to Shotts
56	"was she worth it?"	refers to the pre-decimal price of a marriage licence in Britain, 5/6d; the players shout back "Every penny!"
57	"Heinz varieties"	refers to "Heinz 57", the "57 Varieties" slogan of the H. J. Heinz Company
58	"make them wait"	rhymes with "fifty-eight"; here, the caller often pauses, making the players wait
59	"Brighton line"	not a quote from The Importance of Being Earnest – the play does reference the Brighton line several times, but not 59 in association with it; also sometimes referred to as "route 59", the line Londoners would take on day trips to Brighton and the South Coast; however, there is no proof of this, and photos of the London-to-Brighton train often show number 4, not 59; the origin is more likely because "five and nine" rhymes with "Brighton line"
60	"Grandma's getting frisky"	rhymes with "sixty"
60	five dozen	5 × 12 = 60; refer to 12, above
61	"baker's bun"	rhymes with "sixty-one"
62	"tickety-boo"	Rhymes with "sixty-two".
62	"turn the screw"	Rhymes with "sixty-two".
63	"tickle me"	thymes with "sixty-three"
64	"almost retired"	a reference to the former British male age of mandatory retirement, specifically being one year away from it
64	"red raw"	rhymes with "sixty-four"
65	"retirement age – stop work"	a reference to the former male British age of mandatory retirement
65	"old age pension"	a reference to the former male British age of mandatory retirement
66	"clickety click"	rhymes with "sixty-six"
67	"Stairway to heaven"	rhymes with "sixty-seven"
67	"made in heaven"	rhymes with "sixty-seven"
67	"6-7"	a 2025 children's internet meme that has made its way into bingo calls; see 6-7
68	"pick a mate"	rhymes with "sixty-eight"
68	"saving grace"	rhymes with "sixty-eight"
69	"any way up"	a reference to the number reading the same when viewed upside down
69	"either way up"	a reference to the number reading the same when viewed upside down
69	meal for two"	a reference to the 69 sex position
69	"a favourite of mine"	a reference to the 69 sex position
70	"three score and ten"	a score is a way of counting in 20s in which one score is 20, so 20 × 3 + 10 = 70; three score and ten years is the span of life, according to the Bible
71	"bang on the drum"	rhymes with "seventy-one".
71	"J. Lo's bum"	rhymes with "seventy-one".
72	"Danny La Rue"	rhymes with "seventy-two"
72	"six dozen"	6 × 12 = 72; refer to 12, above
73	"queen bee"	rhymes with "seventy-three"
73	"under the tree"	rhymes with "seventy-three"
73	"lucky 3"	7 is considered a lucky number in some cultures
74	"hit the floor"	rhymes with "seventy-four"
74	"candy store"	rhymes with "seventy-four"
75	"strive and strive"	rhymes with "seventy-five"
76	"trombones"	"Seventy-Six Trombones" is a popular marching song, from the musical The Music Man
77	"two little crutches"	77 resembles two little crutches
77	"Sunset Strip"	from the 1960s television series 77 Sunset Strip; usually sung by the players, they stamp their feet upon hearing "77 Sunset Strip"
78	"39 more steps"	39 + 39 = 78; refer to 39 being "39 steps", above
78	heaven's gate	rhymes with "seventy-eight"
79	"one more time"	rhymes with "seventy-nine"
80	"Gandhi's breakfast"	"ate nothing"
80	"eight and blank"	refers to 80 being made of 8 and 0 (nothing)
81	"fat lady with a walking stick"	8 is supposed to resemble a lady with ample bosom and hips, while 1 is supposed to visually resemble a walking stick
81	"stop and run"	rhymes with "eighty-one"
82	"straight on through"	rhymes with "eighty-two"
83	"time for tea"	rhymes and scans
84	"give me more"	rhymes and scans
85	"staying alive"	rhymes with "eighty-five"
86	"between the sticks"	rhymes with "eighty-six"; refers to the position of goalkeeper in football
87	"Torquay in Devon"	rhymes with "eighty-seven"; refers to Torquay in Devon (rather than one of several other Torquays that were elsewhere in the British Empire)
88	"two fat ladies"	88 visually resembles a lady next to another lady; refer to 8 and 81, above; players can reply with "wobble, wobble!"; if 88 occurs in the last round, then "two fat gentlemen" is called in its place
89	"nearly there"	89 is one away from 90 (the end of the bingo numbers)
89	"almost there"	89 is one away from 90 (the end of the bingo numbers)
90	top of the shop	90 is the highest number in bingo; "shop" refers to the entire game of bingo (and also rhymes with "top")
