= Interpenetrating Dimensional Express =

Studio album by Desmadrados Soldados de Ventura
- Released: 6 January 2014
- Recorded: 1 March – 1 September 2013
- Studio: Sunshine Studios, Manchester
- Genre: Psychedelic rock
- Length: 84:29
- Label: Golden Lab

Desmadrados Soldados de Ventura chronology
Striiide (2013)	Interpenetrating Dimensional Express (2014)	Dieter Dierks Jerks (2014)

Interpenetrating Dimensional Express is the third full-length studio album by Desmadrados Soldados de Ventura, released on 6 January 2014 by Golden Lab Records.

== Track listing ==
Side one
No.	Title	Length
1.	"Photospheric Composition"	21:27

Side two
No.	Title	Length
1.	"Right-Hand Rule"	20:54

Side three
No.	Title	Length
1.	"Sycamore St Shuffle"	21:20

Side four
No.	Title	Length
1.	"101010,000,000"	20:49

== Personnel ==
Adapted from the Interpenetrating Dimensional Express liner notes.

Desmadrados Soldados de Ventura

- Kate Armitage – vocals
- David Birchall – electric guitar
- Andrew Cheetham – drums
- Zak Hane – bass guitar
- Dylan Hughes – bass guitar
- Anthony Joinson – bass guitar
- Nick Mitchell – electric guitar
- Tom Settle – electric guitar
- Edwin Stevens – electric guitar

Production and additional personnel

- David Bailey – cover art, illustrations
- Patrick Crane – recording

== Release history ==
Region	Date	Label	Format	Catalog
United Kingdom	2014	Golden Lab	LP	ROWF 38
