= Clifton Park, NY, Vol. 2 =

Studio album by Desmadrados Soldados de Ventura
- Released: 9 July 2015
- Recorded: April 2015
- Studio: Parashi's basement, Clifton Park, NY
- Genre: Psychedelic rock
- Length: 55:14
- Label: Golden Lab

Desmadrados Soldados de Ventura chronology
Clifton Park, NY, Vol. 1 (2015)	Clifton Park, NY, Vol. 2 (2015)

Clifton Park, NY, Vol. 2 is the sixth studio album and second part of the Clifton Park, NY double album by Desmadrados Soldados de Ventura, released on 9 July 2015 by Golden Lab Records. In writing for The Wire, Edwin Pouncey noted that "the tough Mancunian edge to the playing [...] reveals its true source on Vol 2, an almost industrial attack that is the abrasive obverse of Vol 1's easy gliding approach"

== Track listing ==
Side one
No.	Title	Length
1.	"[untitled]"	27:29

Side two
No.	Title	Length
1.	"[untitled]"	27:45

== Personnel ==
Adapted from the Clifton Park, NY, Vol. 2 liner notes.

Desmadrados Soldados de Ventura

- David Birchall – electric guitar
- Andrew Cheetham – drums
- Mike Griffin – electric guitar
- Eric Hardiman – electric guitar
- Dylan Hughes – electric guitar
- Nick Mitchell – electric guitar
- Edwin Stevens – electric guitar
- Otto Willberg – bass guitar

Production and additional personnel

- John Moloney – cover art, illustrations

== Release history ==
Region	Date	Label	Format	Catalog
United Kingdom	2015	Golden Lab	LP	ROWF 66
