= White Stuff (album) =

Studio album by Royal Trux
- Released: March 1, 2019
- Length: 37:00
- Label: Fat Possum

Royal Trux chronology
Hand of Glory (2002)	White Stuff (2019)

Professional ratings
Aggregate scores
Source	Rating
Metacritic	77/100
Review scores
Source	Rating
AllMusic	3.5/5 stars
Exclaim!	7/10
Mojo	4/5 stars
The Observer	3/5 stars
Pitchfork	7.8/10
Q	4/5 stars
Uncut	8/10

White Stuff s the eleventh studio album by American band Royal Trux. It was released on March 1, 2019, through Fat Possum Records.

It is the band's first album in 19 years.

== Track listing ==
White Stuff track listing
No.	Title	Length
1.	"White Stuff"	3:44
2.	"Year of the Dog"	2:18
3.	"Purple Audacity #2"	3:08
4.	"Suburban Junky Lady"	4:48
5.	"Shows and Tags"	2:26
6.	"Get Used to This" (featuring Barrett Avner, Tim Goldsworthy, Kool Keith, Kid Millions and Alexis Taylor)	3:05
7.	"Sic Em Slow"	3:00
8.	"Every Day Swan"	2:10
9.	"Whopper Dave"	4:18
10.	"Purple Audacity #1"	5:15
11.	"Under Ice"	2:48

== Charts ==
Chart performance of White Stuff
Chart (2019)	Peak position
US Heatseekers Albums (Billboard)	25
US Independent Albums (Billboard)	45
