= Bolaji Abdullahi =

Nigerian politician

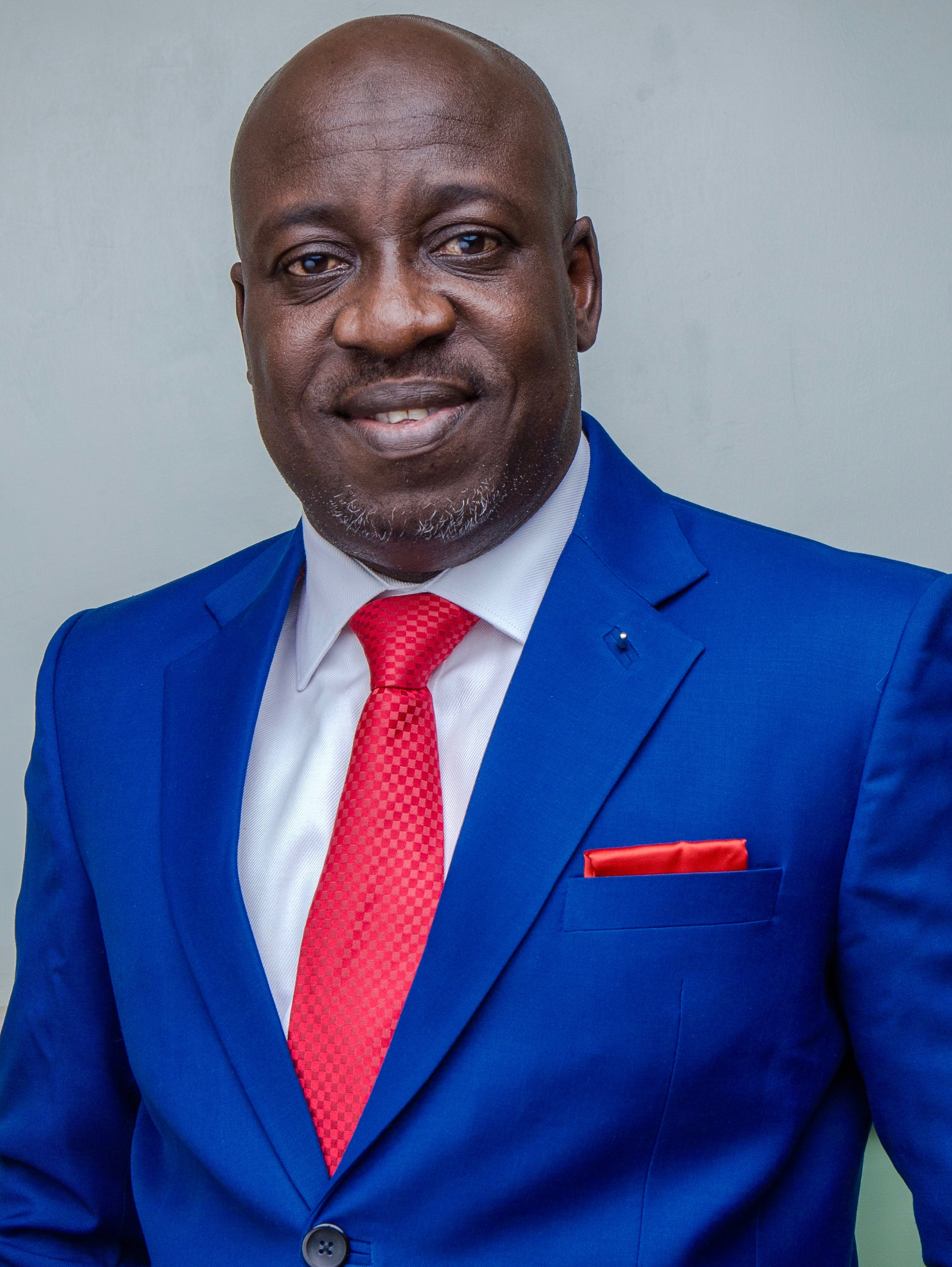
- Mallam Bolaji Abdullahi
- Born: Bolaji Abdullahi; 12 August 1969 (age 57); Kontagora, Niger State, Nigeria
- Education: University of Lagos; University of Sussex
- Occupations: Politician; writer
- Notable work: Sweet Sixteen

Bolaji Abdullahi Ganiyu (born 12 August 1969) is a Nigerian politician, journalist, and writer from Ilorin, Kwara State. He served in the cabinet of the ex-Nigerian President, Goodluck Jonathan, as the Honourable Minister of Youth Development in July 2011, and as the Minister of Sports till 2014. He was also the National Publicity Secretary of the All Progressives Congress (2016-2018). He is the author of Sweet Sixteen, which was adopted by the JAMB/UME 2019–2020; and On A Platter of Gold-How Jonathan Won and Lost Nigeria. He ran for office as Senator to represent Kwara Central Senatorial District in Nigeria's upper legislative chamber.

== Early life and education ==
He spent his early years in Kontagora Niger State where he started his primary school. He completed his primary education at Baraka LSMB primary school in Ilorin in 1981. He briefly attended Iponrin Community Secondary School before proceeding to Government Secondary School, Kwali Abuja where he completed his secondary education in 1987. He started his advanced level studies at the Federal School of Arts and Sciences Suleja, Niger State in 1988 and then proceeded to the University of Lagos where he earned a Second-Class Upper bachelor's degree in Mass Communication in 1994. In 2001, he was awarded a British Government Chevening Scholarship to study for a master's degree in Governance and Development at the Institute of Development Studies, University of Sussex in Brighton UK, where he graduated with a Distinction in 2002. He has attended courses in Harvard University's Kennedy School of Government; Theodore Heuss Institute for Leadership in Gummersbach, Germany; World Bank Institute in Washington DC; and at Ashridge Business School, Berkhamsted, United Kingdom.

== Career ==
In 1997, Abdullahi joined the services of This Day newspapers as a reporter but left a year later for the Africa Leadership Forum, an international civil society organization founded by former Nigerian President Olusegun Obasanjo, where he edited the organization's publications and managed training programmes in democratic leadership. He returned in 2001 to This Day and rose to become Deputy Editor of the newspaper in 2003. He wrote a weekly social and political commentary on the popular backpage column of the newspaper and started the newspaper's Development section.

Abdullahi started his public service career in 2003 when he was appointed first as the Special Assistant, Communication and Strategy to the then Executive Governor of Kwara State, Dr. Bukola Saraki in 2003, and later as the Special Adviser on Policy and Strategy in 2005. He was then appointed as the Kwara State Commissioner of Education, Science and Technology from 2007 to 2011, during which period he championed one of the most comprehensive education reforms in the country and launched the flagship Every Child Counts, that brought hundreds of children back to public schools. In July 2011, he was appointed into the cabinet of the former Nigerian President, Goodluck Jonathan, when he was appointed as the Honourable Minister of Youth Development in July 2011 and later as the Honourable Minister of Sports when he led the Nigerian National Team, the Super Eagles to win the Africa Cup of Nations after 19 years and the Under 17 World Cup for the 5th time.

In December 2016, Abdullahi was announced as the National Publicity Secretary of the All Progressives Congress, a position he retained after he was overwhelmingly elected at the party's national convention in July 2018. On the 1st of August, 2018, Abdullahi officially resigned as the National Publicity Secretary of the All Progressives Congress and defected from the party to join the People's Democratic Party.

Abdullahi came up with Sweet Sixteen in 2017. The book focuses on Aliya, a young woman who must remind her father that she is no longer a child but a young adult. Sweet Sixteen was featured in the 2019 and 2020 Joint Admission and Matriculation Board of the Federal Republic of Nigeriaas the general reading text. The novel deals with themes of adolescent crisis, parental guidance, love, knowledge, and literacy for teens. A reviewer for The Guardian, Akin Oseni, noted that "whether Bolaji Abdullahi has been a success as a politician or otherwise is an exclusive debate for political jurists to negotiate. But with the gift of Sweet Sixteen, there is the possibility that our author may have more to offer humanity in Literature than in politics." The Daily Trust wrote that it was a "compelling tale, loaded with morality and textured with a rich lyrical prose and young adult lingo…story-story, my bestie, OMG among others."

Abdullahi wrote the nonfiction book On a Platter of Gold: How Jonathan Won and Lost Nigeria about president Goodluck Jonathan's rise to power.

On 12 August 2020, Abdullahi officially started a mentorship program known as Bolaji Abdullahi Mentorship Programme (BAMP). The BAMP is a six-month hands-on personal empowerment programme for Nigerian youths on leadership and character building. Since inception, it has drawn high quality resource persons, including Seun Onigbinde of BudgIT and Mrs. Maryam Uwais of the office of the Vice President.
