= Never Been Kissed (disambiguation) =

Never Been Kissed is a 1999 film starring Drew Barrymore.

Never Been Kissed may also refer to:

== Literature ==
- Never Been Kissed, a novel by Melody Carlson

== Television ==
- "Never Been Kissed" (Glee), an episode of Glee
- "Never Been Kissed", an episode of the Canadian show History Bites

== Music ==
- "Never Been Kissed", a song from the Sherrié Austin album, Love in the Real World
- "Never Been Kissed", a song from the Kristine W album, Stronger
- "Never Been Kissed", a song from the Nikki Webster album, Bliss
- "Never Been Kissed", a song written by lyricist Cy Coben and composer Charles Green, recorded separately by actor Jerry Lewis and bandleader Freddy Martin

== See also ==
- Never Been Kissed in the Same Place Twice, a novel by Allan Prior
