= Sweet Sixteen (Abdullahi novel) =

2017 Nigerian novel

- Author: Bolaji Abdullahi
- Language: English
- Genre: Bildungsroman
- Publisher: TND Press
- Publication date: 2017
- Publication place: Nigeria
- Pages: 157
- ISBN: 9-789-78546375-0

Sweet Sixteen, A Coming of Age Story is a 2017 novel by Nigerian politician and writer Bolaji Abdullahi.

The book focuses on Aliya, a young woman who must remind her father that she is no longer a child but a young adult. Sweet Sixteen was featured in the 2019 Joint Admission and Matriculation Board of the Federal Republic of Nigeria as the Novel for Literature in English.

== Synopsis ==
The events of Sweet Sixteen take place over a weekend and follow Aliya, who has recently turned sixteen. Her father, a retired journalist, has written her a lengthy letter that reflects on her life thus far and gives her advice for the future.

== Development ==
Abdullahi drew inspiration for the novel from his daughters, who he noted "were growing up very fast". He was concerned with the "kind of values they were growing up with in the midst of so much that was happening all over the country" and wrote his eldest daughter a letter. She shared the note with her friends, some of whom contacted Abdullahi to discuss topics such as sexuality, prompting him to write Sweet Sixteen in order to reach a larger group of people.

== Reception ==
A reviewer for The Guardian, Akin Oseni, noted that "whether Bolaji Abdullahi has been a success as a politician or otherwise is an exclusive debate for political jurists to negotiate. But with the gift of Sweet Sixteen, there is the possibility that our author may have more to offer humanity in Literature than in politics." The Daily Trust wrote that it was a "compelling tale, loaded with morality and textured with a rich lyrical prose and young adult lingo…story-story, my bestie, OMG among others."
