= Howling Hex =

The Howling Hex is an American rock band founded by guitarist Neil Hagerty.

The band's 2020 album, Knuckleball Express, received a 7.4 rating from Pitchfork, which described it as "Full of charm, panache, and eccentric raw power, Knuckleball Express makes good on his promise to make something real."

== Discography ==
=== Albums ===
- Introducing the Howling Hex LP, 2003
- Section 2 LP, 2004
- The Return of the Third Tower LP, 2004
- All-Night Fox CD, 2005
- You Can't Beat Tomorrow CD/DVD, 2005
- 1-2-3 CD, 2006 (Compilation of material from the three LP-only releases above)
- Nightclub Version of the Eternal CD, 2006
- The Howling Hex XI LP, CD, 2007
- Earth Junk LP, CD, 2008
- Rogue Moon LP, 2009
- Victory Chimp, A Book 4xCD audio book 2011
- Wilson Semiconductors LP, CD 2011
- Navajo Rag Cassette, 2012
- The Best of The Howling Hex LP, CD 2013
- The Hildreth Tapes 3xLP
- Denver LP, cassette, 2016
- Knuckleball Express LP, 2020

=== Compilations ===
- Four-beat Rhythm: The Writings of Wilhelm Reich CD, 2013
