= Royal Trux =

American alternative rock band

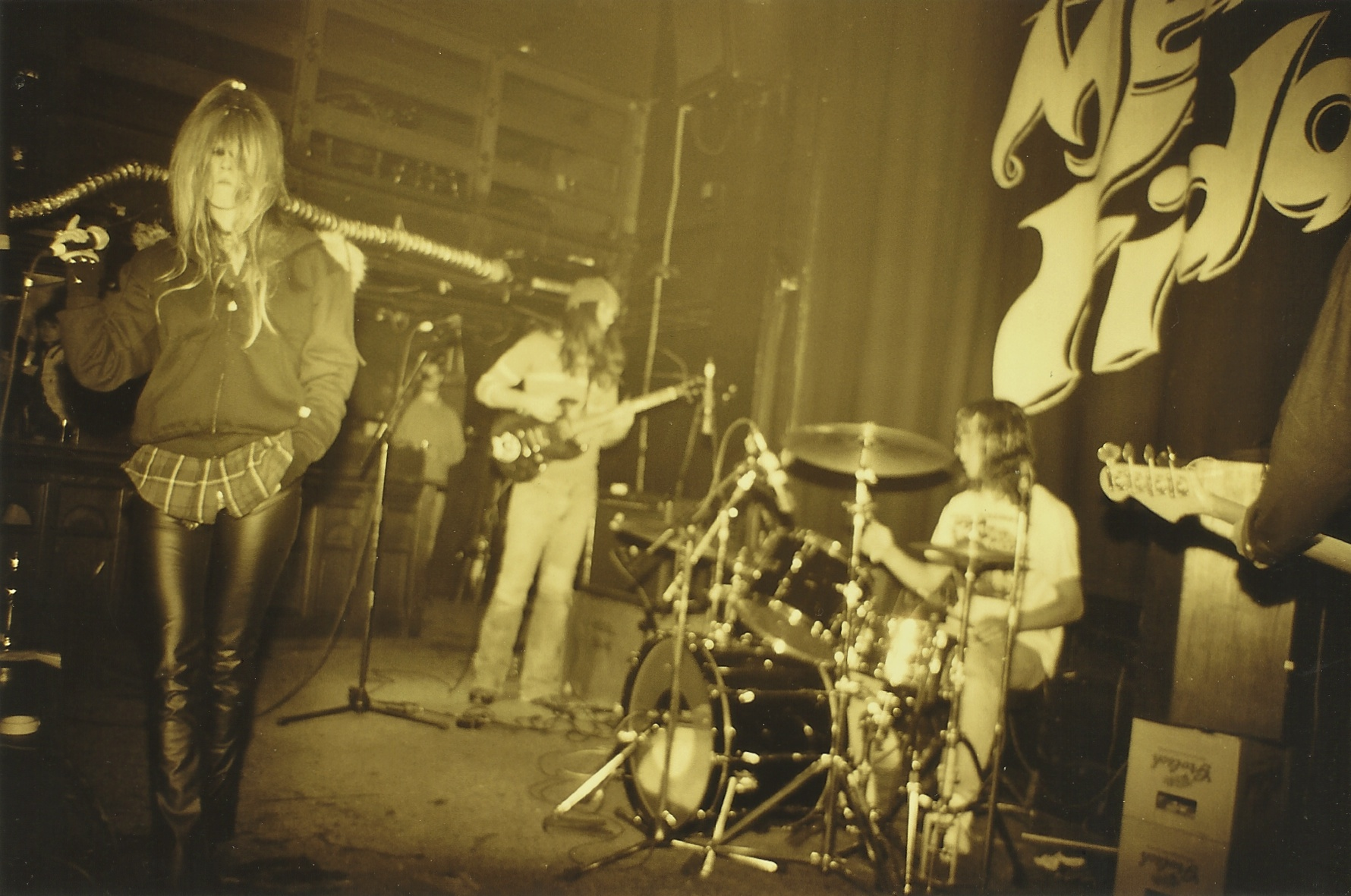
- Royal Trux, 1993

Background information
- Origin: Washington, D.C., United States
- Genres: Alternative rock; noise rock; indie rock
- Years active: 1987–2001; 2015–2019
- Labels: Drag City; Virgin; Domino; P-Vine; Manimal Vinyl; Fat Possum
- Spinoffs: RTX
- Spinoff of: Pussy Galore
- Past members: Neil Michael Hagerty; Jennifer Herrema
- Website: royal-trux.net

Royal Trux was an American alternative rock band active from 1987 to 2001, and again from 2015 to 2019 consisting of Neil Hagerty (vocals, guitar) and Jennifer Herrema (vocals).

== History ==
While still a teenager, Hagerty joined Washington D.C. garage punk band Pussy Galore, led by Jon Spencer, and subsequently relocated to New York. During his time in there, Hagerty convinced his bandmates to release a cassette-only remake of the entire Rolling Stones album Exile on Main Street. While he gained underground notoriety for his work with Pussy Galore, Hagerty reportedly viewed it as a job and intended to pursue his own artistic vision with his girlfriend, Jennifer Herrema, under the name Royal Trux.

Hagerty and Herrema released their first album, Royal Trux, in 1988. After moving to San Francisco, Royal Trux released the experimental double-album Twin Infinitives.

After Twin Infinitives, Royal Trux released an untitled album (sometimes referred to as the Skulls record because of its sleeve artwork). Forgoing the experimentalism of Twin Infinitives, the band instead opted for a more lo-fi approach, recording on an 8-track. The arguably atypical lyricism and sonic atonality of their first two albums was largely abandoned in favor of a more stripped, direct sound.

Following the release of their untitled album, Hagerty and Herrema were joined by guitarist Michael Kaiser and drummer Ian Willers to complete their fourth full-length, Cats and Dogs. The songwriting remained highly experimental, but was more melodic, which was revealed on tracks such as "The Flag," "The Spectre," and "Turn of the Century." Around this time, the band signed with Matador and a Royal Trux record was assigned a catalog number for an album which never appeared.

During the corporate interest in underground music that followed Nirvana's breakthrough success in 1991, Royal Trux signed a three-record contract totaling over $1 million with the major label Virgin. The label viewed it as a way to gain credibility with other, more promising indie bands that they hoped to attract. Some of the money went into buying a house in Virginia and converting it to a studio, where the band recorded themselves and others (such as The Make-Up). According to interviews, the band also kicked their drug habit at this time. (They spent a prior album advance on drugs and are known for their heroin abuse.) The band added a considerably heavier rhythm section with Dan Brown on bass guitar and Chris Pyle (son of Lynyrd Skynyrd drummer Artimus Pyle) on drums. Pyle left after a brief period and was replaced by Ken Nasta, a prominent Jacksonville drummer, formerly with Chain of Fools, The Fenwicks and many others. They also added a percussionist named Rob Armstrong for a short period. In 1995, they released Thank You, recorded almost completely live in the studio with producer David Briggs. Next came Sweet Sixteen. While the band received mainstream media exposure during their time on Virgin (Herrema appeared in Calvin Klein print and TV ads from 1995 to 2000), Virgin was reportedly unhappy with Sweet Sixteen. The band was unwilling to record a third record for the label. Royal Trux returned to their own record label Drag City.

On Drag City, the band released Accelerator in 1998, Veterans of Disorder in 1999, and Pound for Pound in 2000.

Royal Trux also released the triple-LP Singles, Live, Unreleased, as well as a pair of EPs (3-Song EP and Radio Video) and substantial video and webwork.

Hagerty and Herrema often credited themselves as Adam and Eve for their production work. They separated as a couple and dissolved the band following the release of Pound for Pound. Since then, both have recorded albums for Drag City; Hagerty under his own name and as The Howling Hex, and Herrema under the name RTX. After several releases RTX updated their moniker to Black Bananas.

Two reunion shows were announced for August 16, 2015 at The Observatory in Santa Ana, California as part of the Berserktown festival and December 19, 2015 at Webster Hall in New York City.

They played several more shows around the US throughout 2016. They played their first UK show since reuniting at the Victoria Warehouse for TRANSFORMER on May 28, 2017.

In 2017, the band released a live album, Platinum Tips + Ice Cream, which received positive reviews. In early 2018 the band officially left Drag City and signed a new record deal with Mississippi-based indie label Fat Possum Records. The label also made the band's entire discography available on streaming outlets for the first time. The new LP was expected in early 2019.

The band released their first studio album in 19 years, White Stuff, on March 1, 2019, on Fat Possum Records.

During an interview with The Guardian in March 2019 Hagerty announced he was leaving the band, stating "I'm not touring. She steamrollered right over me, man. I'm not ... I'm just doing this as a favour to Fat Possum. The album – I didn't approve of it. I have no idea what it is. I've heard like 10 seconds of one song. I'm out, man." In response, Herrema stated "He's done this on every tour. He always shows up, always does the tours."

On April 30, after having previously been rescheduled due to Herrema's unspecified legal issues, the planned promotional tour for White Stuff was cancelled entirely. The band has not been active since and both members have referred to the band reunion finishing in interviews since White Stuff was released.

== Legacy ==
Royal Trux's music has been significantly influential on a number of underground bands. Dan Koretzky, co-founder of Drag City (to which the band were signed), noted: "If everyone who listened to the Velvet Underground started their own band, then everyone who listened to Royal Trux started reaching beyond their grasp, musical or otherwise". In 2015, Stereogum called them "the most misunderstood band in indie rock. [...] In a world where experimenting and taking chances with music often takes a backseat to image and playing it safe, Royal Trux flipped the script and did the opposite; because they could, and because, for them, it was always, and only, about keeping themselves interested and happy with the music. Their goal from the outset was to deconstruct rock ‘n’ roll and put it back together as they saw fit, with their own artistic vision. It wasn't always pretty, but good art often isn't. What is true is that their music has stood the test of time and sounds just as, if not more, relevant today than it did when conceived."

According to Dan Hancox of The National News, "their influence can be heard in everything from the bluesy sonic assaults made by The Kills or The White Stripes, to Interpol's angular guitars." Both Jamie Hince & Alison Mosshart of The Kills are notable fans of the band, as are Bobby Gillespie of Primal Scream, Stephen Malkmus of Pavement & Derek Miller of Sleigh Bells. Thurston Moore of Sonic Youth cited the band's debut album as an influence on their music, calling it "the coolest record of that year, it was reckless, had a casual vision and sense of danger to it, it was completely experimental and it rocked. Much more so than any record Red Hot Chili Peppers had that year, or whatever."

Nate Young of Wolf Eyes named Twin Infinitives one of his favorite albums of all time, praising their avant-garde use of new technology as being influential on his music. Will Oldham, who had worked with the band on his “Trudy Dies”/“Come In” single, named them "hugely influential upon" his "professional musical life." MGMT identified the band as a big influence on their own creative risk-taking, with Ben Goldwasser praising them as "amazing songwriters — they disguise pop songs really well.” Alexis Taylor of Hot Chip cited Royal Trux as his favourite band, stating that "they really set the bar for what I thought a band could be like live. Hot Chip never really sounded like Royal Trux, but the joy of repetition in "Over and Over" is as much to do with their spirit as anything ‘carnal’ (to quote "Run Shaker Life", the song they opened that set with). They changed it all for me".

== Discography ==
=== Studio albums ===
- Royal Trux (Royal, 1988; 2018 re-issue Fat Possum)
- Twin Infinitives (Drag City, 1990; 2018 re-issue on Fat Possum)
- Untitled (Drag City/Domino, 1992; 2018 re-issue on Fat Possum)
- Cats and Dogs (Drag City/Domino, 1993; 2018 re-issue on Fat Possum)
- Thank You (Virgin/EMI, 1995)
- Sweet Sixteen (Virgin/EMI, 1997)
- Accelerator (Drag City/Domino, 1998; 2018 re-issue on Fat Possum)
- Veterans of Disorder (Drag City/Domino, 1999; 2018 re-issue on Fat Possum)
- Pound for Pound (Drag City/Domino, 2000; 2018 re-issue on Fat Possum)
- Hand of Glory (recorded in 1989, rel. Drag City/Domino, 2002; 2018 re-issue on Fat Possum)
- White Stuff (Fat Possum, 2019)

=== Compilations ===
- Singles, Live, Unreleased (Drag City/Domino, 1997)
- Platinum Tips + Ice Cream (Drag City/Domino, 2017)
- Quantum Entanglement (Fat Possum, 2020)

=== Remix album ===
- Pink Stuff (remixes by Ariel Pink) (Fat Possum, 2019)

=== Singles and EPs ===
- "Back To School" b/w "Cleveland" (Drag City, 1993)
- 3-Song EP (Drag City/Domino, 1998; 2018 re-issue on Fat Possum)
- Radio Video (Drag City/Domino, 2000; 2018 re-issue on Fat Possum)
