= Rian Murphy =

Drummer and music producer

Rian Murphy is a drummer and music producer for the Chicago record label Drag City, and also acts as the company's sales director.

He has worked with Appendix Out, Palace Music, Smog, Royal Trux, the Silver Jews and Edith Frost. In 2000, Murphy released the EP All Most Heaven with Will Oldham.

Murphy was also involved in the comedy series People Under the Stares.
