= Jennifer Herrema =

American singer-songwriter, record producer, artist, model

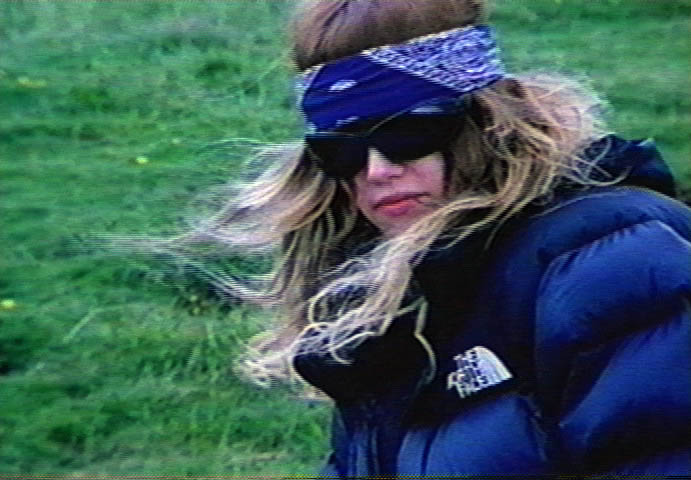

Background information
- Birth name: Jennifer James Herrema
- Also known as: Royal Trux, RTX
- Genres: Rock
- Occupations: Singer-songwriter; record producer; artist; model
- Years active: 1988–present
- Labels: Drag City
- Website: royal-trux.com

Jennifer James Herrema is an American rock music singer-songwriter, record producer, artist, and model best known for her work as one half of the rock band Royal Trux.

== Career ==
Herrema formed Royal Trux with her partner Neil Hagerty and lived with him in Washington, Virginia. After producing several records, the band split in 2001. Herrema then went on to form a new band, RTX, which eventually became the band Black Bananas. She has produced and mixed records with other artists including Bad Wizard. She has published numerous articles on music, art, fashion, and lifestyle subjects in various publications including Vice Magazine.

In 2016, she appeared on The Avalanches' album Wildflower on the song "Stepkids".
