= Neil Hagerty =

American singer-songwriter

Neil Michael Hagerty (born 1965) is an American musician, singer-songwriter and record producer. He is best known for his work in Royal Trux which he formed with his partner Jennifer Herrema, with whom he lived in Washington, Virginia.

Hagerty released several solo albums since Royal Trux's demise in 2001, followed by recordings under the moniker The Howling Hex. He also performed as a guitarist and songwriter in Pussy Galore and Weird War. Hagerty is the author of two books, Victory Chimp (1997), a science fiction novel, and Public Works (2005), a collection of short essays.

On 14 April 2023 Hagerty was arrested in Denver, Colorado after allegedly assaulting three police officers who had been called to the scene for a welfare check. Later that month, he was charged with three felonies — one count of second-degree assault against a police officer and two counts of attempting to disarm a peace officer — as well as two misdemeanor counts of resisting arrest in relation to the incident.

On 13 March 2024 charges against Hagerty were dismissed.

== Discography ==
- Neil Michael Hagerty CD, LP (2001)
- Plays That Good Old Rock and Roll CD, LP (2002)
- Neil Michael Hagerty & the Howling Hex CD, LP (2003)
