= Drag City (record label) =

American independent record label

- Founded: 1989; 37 years ago
- Founder: Dan Koretzky; Dan Osborn
- Genre: Indie rock; noise rock; indie folk; alternative country; experimental
- Country of origin: United States
- Location: Chicago, Illinois

Drag City is an American independent record label based in Chicago, Illinois, established in the city in 1989 by Dan Koretzky and Dan Osborn. It specializes in indie rock, noise rock, psychedelic folk, alternative country, and experimental music. The label has featured numerous artists, including Bonnie "Prince" Billy, Bill Callahan, Joanna Newsom, and Silver Jews.

== History ==
Drag City was formed in 1989 when Koretzky, who was working for a record distribution company in Chicago, listened to Royal Trux's debut album and contacted the band with the offer of releasing a single. Hero Zero was soon followed by Demolition Plot J-7, the second release by Pavement. The first album release on the label came later the same year—Twin Infinitives, the second album by Royal Trux.

The label released the US version of Scott Walker's Tilt in 1997, after the label approached him wishing to give the album a US release. Walker described releasing the album on the indie label as "an experiment". Several members of Drag City's staff have played in bands; press-chief Gene Booth played keyboards and guitar in USA, and Booth, head of sales Rian Murphy, and founder Dan Koretzky all played in Mantis. Booth was also a member of Chestnut Station.

In recent years, they have expanded their catalog to include alternative comedy releases, with recent outputs from Fred Armisen, Neil Hamburger, and Andy Kaufman among others, and reissues, notably by Gary Higgins and Death. In 1997, Drag City began publishing printed works such as the literary magazine The Minus Times and Neil Hagerty's novel Victory Chimp. The label distributed the 2013 documentary The Source Family. After years of refusing to release its artists' music on streaming platforms, the label finally made its music available for streaming via Apple Music in July 2017. In April 2018, they made their catalog available on the streaming platforms Spotify, Tidal, and Google Play.

== Roster ==
- Aerial M
- AZITA
- Bachelorette
- Baby Dee
- William Basinski
- Richard Bishop
- Blues Control
- Bill Callahan
- Cave
- Cynthia Dall
- Chris Darrow
- Circuit Des Yeux
- Death
- Dope Body
- Eiko Ishibashi
- Espers
- Faun Fables
- Flying Saucer Attack
- Mark Fosson
- Edith Frost
- The Fucking Champs
- Loose Fur
- Ghost
- David Grubbs
- Neil Michael Hagerty
- Cory Hanson
- The High Llamas
- The Howling Hex
- John Mulaney & the Sack Lunch Bunch
- Liimanarina
- Magik Markers
- Monotonix
- Movietone
- Mickey Newbury
- Joanna Newsom
- Scout Niblett
- Nig-Heist
- Will Oldham (Bonnie "Prince" Billy, Palace Music, etc.)
- Jim O'Rourke
- Papa M
- Pavement
- Pearls and Brass
- Pearls Before Swine
- Jessica Pratt
- Purple Mountains
- The Red Krayola
- The Renderers
- Alasdair Roberts
- Royal Trux
- RTX
- Lætitia Sadier
- Ty Segall
- Sic Alps
- Silver Jews
- Six Organs of Admittance
- Stereolab
- Sun Araw
- U.S. Maple
- Scott Walker
- Wand
- Weird War
- White Magic
- Woo
- Michael Yonkers

== See also ==
- List of record labels
