= Joanna Newsom discography =

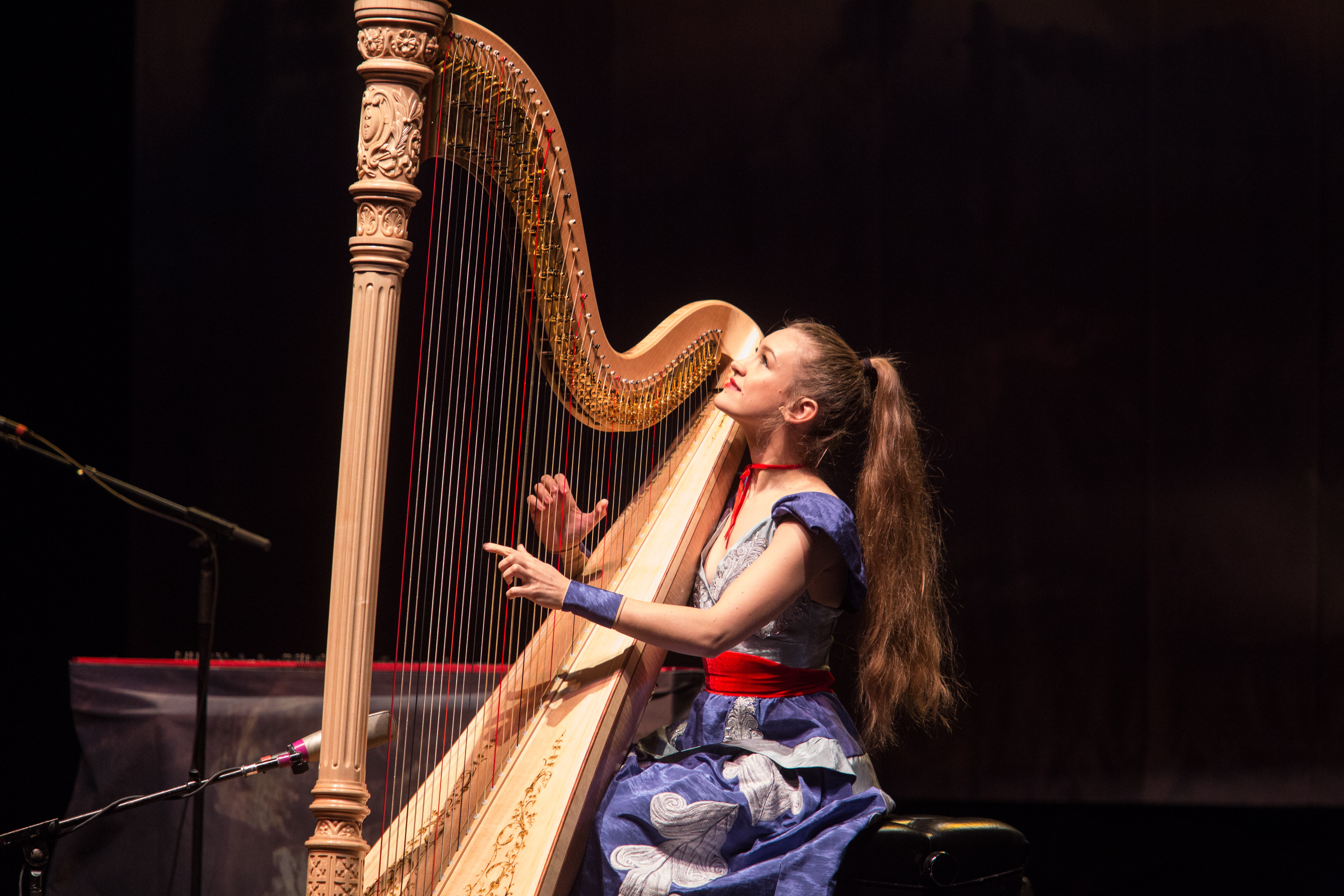
- Newsom performing at the Orpheum Theatre in Boston, Massachusetts December 2015
- Studio albums: 4
- Extended plays: 3
- Singles: 4
- Music videos: 3
- Promotional singles: 3

The discography of Joanna Newsom, an American alternative folk musician, consists of four studio albums, three extended plays, four singles, and three promotional singles.

== Studio albums ==
Title	Album details	Peak chart positions										Sales
Title	Album details	US	US Folk	US Indie	AUS	CAN	FRA	GER	IRE	NOR	UK	Sales
The Milk-Eyed Mender	Released: March 23, 2004; Label: Drag City; Formats: CD, LP, digital download	—	—	—	—	—	—	—	—	—	—	US: 200,000; UK: 34,551
Ys	Released: November 14, 2006; Label: Drag City; Formats: CD, digital download	134	—	5	98	—	168	98	50	29	41	US: 250,000; UK: 45,672
Have One on Me	Released: February 23, 2010; Label: Drag City; Formats: CD, LP, digital download	75	1	7	62	80	171	40	24	16	28	US: 50,000
Divers	Released: October 23, 2015; Label: Drag City; Formats: CD, digital download	30	1	2	63	81	168	22	8	26	10	
"—" denotes albums that did not chart.

== Extended plays ==
Title	EP details	Peak chart positions			
Title	EP details	US Heat	US Indie	DEN	UK
Walnut Whales	Released: 2002; Label: self-released; Formats: CD-R	—	—	—	—
Yarn and Glue	Released: 2003; Label: self-released; Formats: CD-R	—	—	—	—
Joanna Newsom and the Ys Street Band	Released: April 9, 2007; Label: Drag City; Formats: CD, vinyl, digital download	17	47	7	135
"—" denotes albums that did not chart.

== Singles ==
Title	Year	Album
"Sprout and the Bean"	2004	The Milk-Eyed Mender
"What We Have Known"	2011	non-album single
"Sapokanikan"	2015	Divers
"Leaving the City"	2015	Divers

=== Promotional singles ===
Title	Year	Album
"'81"	2010	Have One on Me
"Good Intentions Paving Co."	2010	Have One on Me
"Kingfisher"	2010	Have One on Me
"Have One On Me"	2010	Have One on Me

== Music videos ==
Title	Year	Album	Director
"Sprout and the Bean"	2004	The Milk-Eyed Mender	Terri Timely
"Sapokanikan"	2015	Divers	Paul Thomas Anderson
"Divers"	2015	Divers	Paul Thomas Anderson

== Contributions on compilations ==
- The Golden Apples of the Sun (Bastet, 2004) With the song "Bridges and Balloons" (Originally released on The Milk-Eyed Mender)

== Bands, collaborations and guest appearances ==
- Golden Shoulders – Let My Burden Be (Doppler, 2002)
- The Pleased – One Piece from the Middle (self-released, 2002)
- The Pleased – Don't Make Things (Big Wheel Recreation, 2003)
- Nervous Cop – Nervous Cop (5 Rue Christine, 2003)
- Vetiver – Vetiver (Dicristina Stair, 2004)
- Smog – A River Ain't Too Much to Love (Drag City, 2005)
- Vashti Bunyan – Lookaftering (Fat Cat Records, 2005)
- RF & Lili De La Mora – Eleven Continents (Rowing at Sea/ Time Release Records, 2007)
- Moore Brothers – Aptos (American Dust, 2009)
- Golden Shoulders – Get Reasonable (2009)
- Kevin Barker – You and Me (Gnomonsong, 2010)
- The Roots – How I Got Over (2010)
- Thao with the Get Down Stay Down – We the Common (Ribbon Music, 2013)
- Hard Skin – The Man Who Ran the Town (JT Classics, 2013)
