= Joanna Newsom and the Ys Street Band =

Joanna Newsom & the Ys Street Band

EP by Joanna Newsom
- Released: April 9, 2007
- Genre: Indie folk, progressive folk
- Length: 24:06
- Label: Drag City

Joanna Newsom chronology
Yarn and Glue (2003)	Joanna Newsom & the Ys Street Band (2007)

Professional ratings
Review scores
Source	Rating
AllMusic	3.5/5 stars
Harmonium	4.5/5 stars
Pitchfork Media	8.7/10
Stylus	C
Twisted Ear	4/5 stars

Joanna Newsom & the Ys Street Band is an EP by Joanna Newsom, first released on April 9, 2007, via Drag City.

The EP was recorded and mixed over three days at The Plant Studios after Joanna had cancelled three consecutive shows due to a lost voice at the end of her seven-week-long U.S. tour. It contains one previously unreleased song, "Colleen", and new arrangements of two previously released songs; "Clam, Crab, Cockle, Cowrie" from Milk-Eyed Mender and Walnut Whales and "Cosmia" from Ys.

The album title is a pun on the E Street Band, a musical group famous for backing up Bruce Springsteen.

The cover is a photograph by William Eggleston.

== Track listing ==
1. "Colleen" – 6:41
2. "Clam, Crab, Cockle, Cowrie" (New arrangement) – 4:02
3. "Cosmia" (New arrangement) – 13:23

== Charts ==
Chart (2007)	Peak Position
US Heatseekers Albums (Billboard)	7
US Independent Albums (Billboard)	47
Danish Album Chart	7
UK Singles Chart	135

== Personnel ==
- Joanna Newsom – harp, vocals
- Ryan Francesconi – tambura, guitar
- Dan Cantrell – accordion, musical saw
- Neal Morgan – drum, vocals
- Kevin Barker – banjo, guitar
