= Walnut Whales =

EP by Joanna Newsom
- Released: 2002
- Recorded: 2002
- Genre: Indie folk, contemporary folk, folk rock
- Length: 36:15
- Label: Self-released
- Producer: Noah Georgeson, Joanna Newsom

Joanna Newsom chronology
Walnut Whales (2002)	Yarn and Glue (2003)

Walnut Whales is the self-distributed debut EP by American multi-instrumentalist and singer-songwriter Joanna Newsom. It was released in 2002 and sold in limited numbers in CD-R format. All tracks on the record, except for "Erin", "Flying a Kite", and "The Fray", were later re-recorded and released on Newsom's debut studio album The Milk-Eyed Mender (2004), with minor lyrical changes. The EP has been described as indie folk, contemporary folk, and folk rock.

The title of the EP was inspired by the 1975 children's book "Snips and Snails and Walnut Whales: Nature Crafts for Children", by Phyllis Fiarotta.

== Background ==
Walnut Whales was initially not intended for public distribution, but at the suggestion of Noah Georgeson, Newsom's then-boyfriend as well as co-producer and recording engineer of the EP, she burned several copies to sell at her early performances. Newsom's friend and bandmate in Golden Shoulders, Adam Kline, gave one of her CDs to singer-songwriter Will Oldham at a show in Nevada City. Oldham was impressed with Newsom's music and asked her to tour with him. Kline also gave a copy of the record to the owner of his record label, Drag City. Drag City signed Newsom and released her debut studio album The Milk-Eyed Mender in 2004.

Discussing the record, Newsom stated that "The very first Walnut Whales recording was recorded just a few weeks after I had started singing, out of the blue, started singing. And the voice, you can hear how uncomfortable I am with it, and how terrified I am with it."

== Track listing ==
All tracks are written by Joanna Newsom.

No.	Title	Length
1.	"Erin"	3:41
2.	"Cassiopeia"	4:00
3.	"Peach, Plum, Pear"	3:27
4.	"Clam Crab Cockle Cowrie"	3:52
5.	"Flying a Kite"	6:34
6.	"The Fray"	3:22
7.	"En Gallop!"	6:26
8.	"The Book of Right-On"	4:40
