= Golden Shoulders =

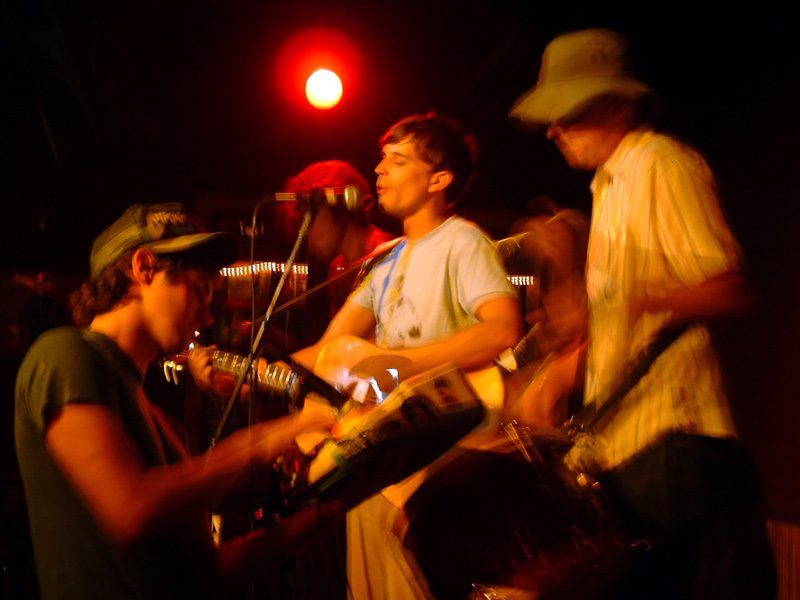
- A Golden Shoulders performance in Nevada City, California, in 2003.

Background information
- Origin: Nevada City, California, United States
- Genres: Indie rock
- Years active: 2001–present
- Labels: Doppler Records; Welcome Home
- Website: Official website

Golden Shoulders is a band from Nevada City, California. Formed in 2001 by songwriter Adam Kline, the group operates with a rotating lineup and has featured significant contributions from such notables as Joanna Newsom (who sang and played piano on the first Golden Shoulders album, Let My Burden Be, before going on to international acclaim), Todd Roper and Greg Brown (Cake, Deathray), Rich Good (the Psychedelic Furs, the Pleased), Dan Elkan (Broken Bells, Hella), Josh Klinghoffer (Red Hot Chili Peppers, John Frusciante, PJ Harvey, Beck), Rusty Miller (Jackpot), Jonathan Hischke (Dot Hacker), Rob Kieswetter (Bobby Birdman), Hunter Burgan (AFI), songwriter Brett Shady, drummer Neal Morgan, and more. A complete, current list of contributors can be found here.

Golden Shoulders has released four albums, Let My Burden Be (2002), Friendship is Deep (2004), Get Reasonable (2009), and Could This Be the End (2019), along with the EPs Bee 17 (2005), Kin (2006), Music Friends (2013), Music Romans (2016), and Music Countrymen (2019). Thus far, other than two cover songs and two co-written songs, all officially released Golden Shoulders songs have been written by Kline and arranged by the musicians on the recordings. Live arrangements differ from the recorded versions based on the whims of the performers. Golden Shoulders' first album, Let My Burden Be, peaked at No. 66 on the CMJ chart, which measures college radio plays in the United States. The April 2005 issue of MOJO magazine gave the Golden Shoulders' second album, Friendship is Deep, a review of four out of five stars. The follow-up album, Get Reasonable, received another four star review from MOJO in the November 2009 issue, and the next, Could This Be the End, also received four stars in MOJO's December 2019 edition. Golden Shoulders also had several songs featured on the popular episodic video blog, lonelygirl15.

The band has toured the United States several times, including 2004's Speed of Sound Tour, 2006's Annyong Tour, 2009's Flawless Tour, 2010's Drive Across America Tour, and 2017's What's The Hecks Tour. The shows performed on these tours were largely performed without electricity, meaning that at many shows, no microphones or amplifiers were used, though the band sometimes appears as a full-band, plugged-in lineup when playing in their home state of California.

== Discography ==
- Let My Burden Be CD (Released October 22, 2002)
- Friendship Is Deep CD (Released August 23, 2004)
- Bee 17 EP (Released June 8, 2005)
- KIN EP (Released August 22, 2006)
- Get Reasonable CD (Released May 5, 2009)
- Music Friends EP (Released April 23, 2013)
- Music Romans EP (Released May 6, 2016)
- Could This Be the End CD/LP (Released September 13, 2019)
- Music Countrymen EP (Released December 27, 2019)
