= Neal Morgan =

American drummer

- Born: March 7, 1979 (age 47)
- Instrument: drums
- Years active: 2006–present

Neal Morgan (born March 7, 1979) is an American drummer, arranger of drums and percussion, and singer-songwriter. Morgan is best known as the drummer for Joanna Newsom and Bill Callahan, among other songwriters, and for five solo albums.

The first three of Morgan's albums were composed of only his own drumming and singing. His 2009 debut album To The Breathing World and the 2011 LP In The Yard were self-releases distributed by Drag City. His third LP, the self-titled spoken album Neal Morgan, was released by Portland Oregon label Party Damage in 2014. On May 5, 2017 Morgan released his fourth full-length album, Sketchbook March 2015 - March 2016 digitally, with a cassette release by Portland label Beacon Sound.

The 24-song 85-minute PAW, his fifth album, was released March 14, 2025 with a limited edition cassette and digital streaming on all platforms. It was the artist's first collection of pop songs and the first of his albums to feature collaborators (see: PAW lyrics & credits). In a March 12, 2025 review, Portland's Willamette Week called the album "One of the more intriguing collections of music to come out of Portland in recent memory" and noted that “In terms of its ambition, PAW brings to mind Cindy Lee’s Diamond Jubilee”. The album was covered and/or playlisted upon its release by Brooklyn Vegan, Stereogum, NPR Music, Talkhouse, AU Review, among other music review outlets.

Morgan began drumming for Joanna Newsom in 2006 for the touring cycle in support of her second album Ys. In a 2007 interview, Newsom said of Morgan "I am in awe of him...he elevates literally every musical project he touches." He arranged drums and percussion for the live performance of that material as well as arranging for songs from her debut release, The Milk-Eyed Mender. Morgan contributed singing as well as performing his drum and percussion arrangements on Newsom's 2007 EP Joanna Newsom and the Ys Street Band. Morgan arranged and performed the drums and percussion on Newsom's third record, the triple album Have One On Me, released in 2010, and accompanied Newsom in live performance for the tour cycle for that record, often opening shows with solo sets of drumming and singing.

He arranged and performed drums and percussion for the songs Sapokanikan, Goose Eggs, and Waltz of the 101st Lightborne from Newsom's 2015 LP Divers.

Morgan began drumming for Bill Callahan in 2009 at the tail end of Callahan's touring for his second self-titled album Sometimes I Wish We Were An Eagle. Morgan and Callahan performed as a duo for a tour of the Southern United States in late 2009 and a second tour of Spain, France and Portugal in 2010. Morgan arranged drums and percussion on Callahan's third self-titled record, Apocalypse, released in 2011, and along with guitarist Matt Kinsey accompanied Callahan for the tour cycle in support of that album. He was featured in the 2012 Hanly Banks documentary Apocalypse, which followed a 2011 Bill Callahan tour in the United States.

Morgan's second LP, In The Yard, featured Philip Guston's painting Evidence, 1970 on the cover. Morgan has lectured on the painter Philip Guston since 2012. He gave four lectures on the west coast of the United States on the occasion of Guston's 100th birthday in June, 2013.

Morgan arranged and performed drums and percussion with Robin Pecknold and Morgan Henderson on the soundtrack for the documentary Birth Story: Ina May Gaskin & The Farm Wives in 2012.

He arranged and performed and was the recording engineer for drums and percussion for Roy Harper's Man Or Myth, a September 23, 2013 release on Bella Union.

On October 22, 2013, Morgan performed the song Corduroy from Pearl Jam's album Vitalogy with Robin Pecknold and Daniel Rossen on Late Night With Jimmy Fallon, as a part of that show's "Pearl Jam Week".

Morgan arranged and performed drums and percussion for composer Brocker Way's score of The Battered Bastards of Baseball, a Netflix Original Documentary released July 11, 2014.

Along with Robin Pecknold and Morgan Henderson, he arranged and performed drums for the score of A Nice Day For A Walk To The End, a film by Sean Pecknold and Matt Daniels, released July 2014.

Morgan and Robin Pecknold scored the Off-Broadway play Wyoming, which was written by Brian Watkins and directed by Danya Taymor. The play was presented at NYC's Theater For The New City from January 15–31, 2015.

On May 18, 2016, while answering fan questions on his Instagram account, Pecknold announced that his band Fleet Foxes was working on new material with Morgan as the drummer.

In late 2017/early 2018, Morgan arranged and performed drums and percussion for composer Brocker Way's score of the 2018 Netflix documentary series Wild, Wild Country.

Morgan lives in Portland, OR and was born and raised in Nevada City, CA.
