= Hanna Tuulikki =

Hanna Tuulikki is a Finnish-English vocalist, musician and artist, born in Sussex, who is involved in the Nalle (Finnish for "teddy bear") and Scatter musical projects, and has also contributed to the One Ensemble of Daniel Padden. Her vocals have been compared to those of Joanna Newsom and Björk on occasion, also attracting comparisons to Yoko Ono and Lau Nau. As well as singing, she plays the kantele, a traditional Finnish stringed instrument, and the flute. As an artist Tuulikki has created the artwork for both the James Blackshaw curated compilation record The Garden of Forking Paths, and the Arborea curated compilation record Leaves of Life.

She studied Environmental Art at the Glasgow School of Art and had a residency in Cromarty, where she recorded people imitating the sea on the CD 100 Breaths, 100 Waves, and a replication of a dawn chorus on Salutations To The Sun. Further releases followed on Tuulikki's own Gleaners record label.

In 2007, Tuulikki used sound and light to transform boarded-up, condemned row-houses in Dunfermline's Duncan Crescent, installing "dream machines" - magic lanterns featuring silhouettes of flora and fauna.

In 2008 she contributed to Schlachtfest Session II, an album also featuring John Tchicai, Hans Joachim Irmler, Jan Fride, Roman Bunka, Aby Vulliamy, Chris Hladowski, and George Murray.

She later formed Two Wings, a band centred on her songwriting partnership with Trembling Bells guitarist Ben Reynolds. The band released their debut album Love's Spring in 2012.

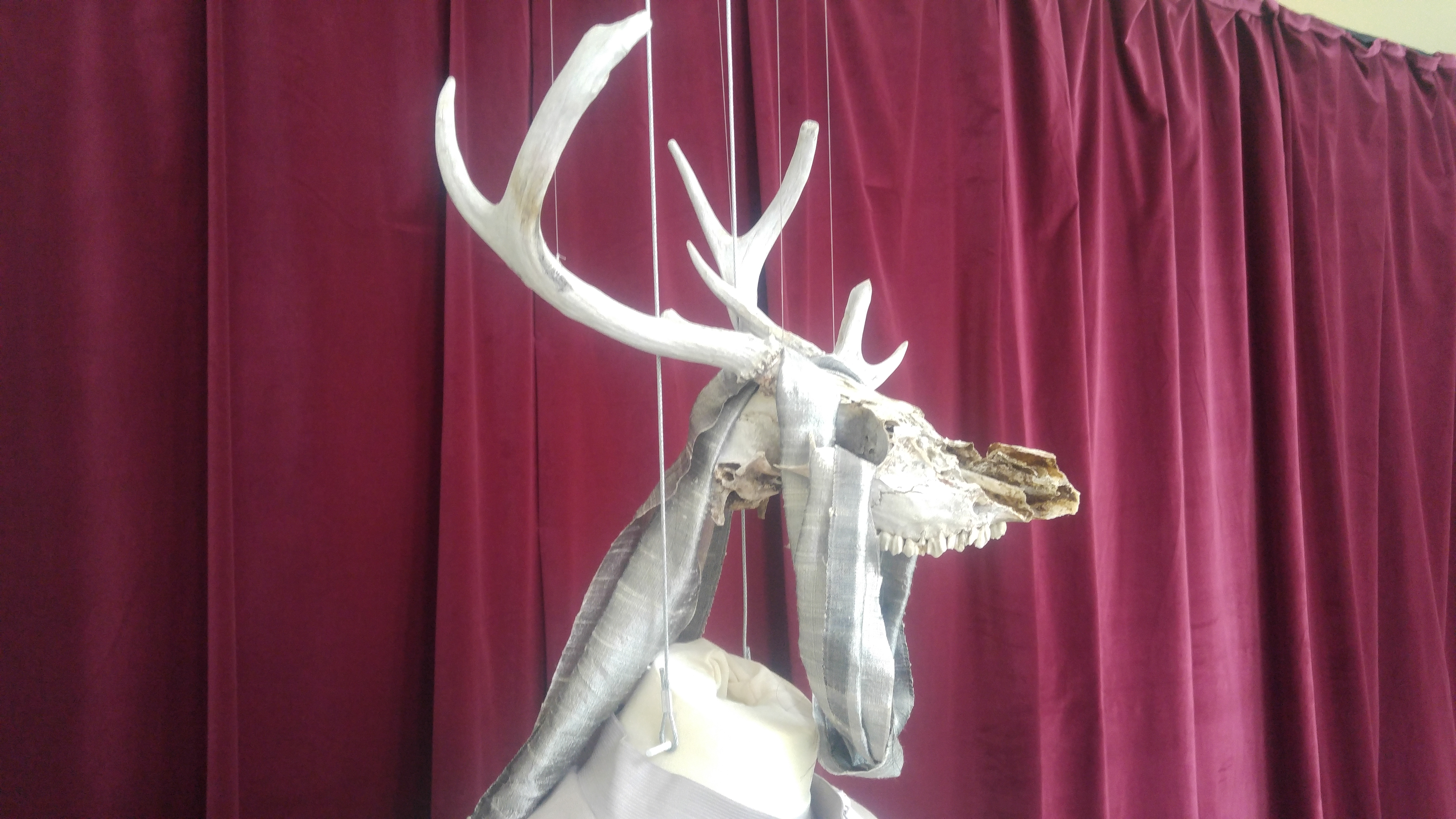
Deer Dancer by Hanna Tuulikki

In 2019, Tuulikki exhibited new work at Edinburgh Printmakers. The show was called Deer Dancer and was inspired by the interactions of deer with indigenous peoples across the world. Tuulikki created a new work on film, costumes and performed vocals, as well as producing a pictorial score for the show.

In 2024 Tuulikki was nominated for an Ivor Novello Award at The Ivors Classical Awards. The Bird That Never Flew was nominated for Best Sound Art.
