= Nalle (band) =

Psychedelic folk music trio based in Glasgow, Scotland

- Origin: Glasgow, Scotland
- Genres: Psychedelic folk
- Years active: 2004 – present
- Labels: Pickled Egg Records; Locust Music
- Members: Hanna Tuulikki; Aby Vulliamy; Chris Hladowski
- Website: Pickled Egg records

Nalle is also a Finnish nickname for persons named Björn; notables include Björn Wahlroos and Björn Westerlund.

Nalle (Finnish for a small bear, generally a teddy bear, and named after a childhood toy of vocalist Hanna Tuulikki) are a psychedelic folk trio, based in Glasgow, who were formed in the summer of 2004. They comprise Finnish-English vocalist Hanna Tuulikki (vocals, kantele, flute), Aby Vulliamy (viola) and Chris Hladowski (bouzouki, clarinet) from Bradford. Nalle combine improvisational song structures with unusual instrumentation, sometimes with a decidedly Celtic influence. Tuulikki's vocals have been compared to those of Joanna Newsom and Björk.

Nalle have released music on Pickled Egg Records, Locust Music and have also released a track on Singing Knives Records. Their debut album, By Chance Upon Waking has received favourable reviews thus far from publications such as Trouser Press and PopMatters.

== Discography ==
- By Chance Upon Waking (Pickled Egg Records, 2006)
- The Siren’s Wave (Locust, 2008)
- Wilder Shores of Love (Alt.vinyl, 2010)

== Artwork ==
All cover illustrations so far have been produced by Hanna Tuulikki, who is also a visual artist. They incorporate many influences from nature, such as "winged polar bears, bees, birds, and plants on a snow-white background"

== Collaborations and other projects ==
All three band members have also been involved with Scatter. Additionally, Aby Vulliamy and Chris Hladowski are members of The One Ensemble Of Daniel Padden, which also shares members with Volcano The Bear.

== Downloadable songs ==
- Sunne Song
- Iron's Oath
- New Roots
