= Rich Good =

British musician (born 1974)

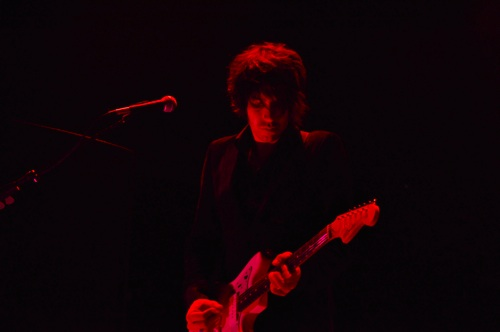
- Good performing in 2009

Background information
- Born: 17 June 1974 (age 52); Crawley, West Sussex, England
- Genres: Alternative rock
- Occupations: Musician; songwriter
- Instrument: Guitar
- Years active: 2000–present
- Member of: The Psychedelic Furs
- Formerly of: The Pleased

Rich Good (born 17 June 1974) is a British musician and recording artist. He grew up in Horley, Surrey, near London and began playing guitar at around the age of 12 or 13.His first recognised musical work was as a songwriter and founding member of San Francisco band the Pleased, alongside Joanna Newsom, Noah Georgeson, Genaro Vergoglini, Luckey Remington and Jason Clark.

== Career ==
Since the split of the Pleased, he concentrated on his own project Kings & Queens, and released three albums The Dream Ends in Fury (2006), Like a Warning (2008) and Jet in Carina (2010). Good also played slide guitar on Bert Jansch's The Black Swan, produced by Georgeson of the Pleased.

He is currently the guitarist for the Psychedelic Furs and has a project named Mirrors in San Francisco. He lives in Wonder Valley, California.
