= Two Wings =

Two Wings may refer to:

- Two Wings (band), a Scottish rock band
- Two Wings (album), a 1994 album by Vika and Linda
- Two Wings Mariner UL, an American amphibious biplane, manufactured by Two Wings Aviation
