= Have One on Me =

Have One On Me

Studio album by Joanna Newsom
- Released: February 23, 2010
- Recorded: 2009 (Note: Main vocals and instrumentation recorded at Radiostar Studios in Weed, CA, King Sound & Pictures in Laurel Canyon, Los Angeles, CA, Station to Station in Grass Valley, CA Recording of other instrumentation at Fantasy Studios in Berkeley, CA, Sear Sound in New York City, Quarry House in Trinidad, CA, The Cedar House in Seattle, WA, and Portland, OR Mixed at King Sound & Pictures in Laurel Canyon, Los Angeles, CA and Magnet Studios in Tokyo, Japan and mastered at Abbey Road Studios in London, England)
- Genre: Indie folk
- Length: 124:08
- Label: Drag City
- Producer: Joanna Newsom

Joanna Newsom chronology
Ys (2006)	Have One On Me (2010)	Divers (2015)

Singles from Have One On Me
- 1. "'81" Released: January 26, 2010; 2. "Good Intentions Paving Company" Released: February 2, 2010; 3. "Kingfisher" Released: February 9, 2010; 4. "Have One On Me" Released: February 23, 2010

A 30-second extract from Baby Birch, illustrating the electric guitar/harp/bass/drums arrangement used for several tracks on Have One on Me.

Have One On Me is the third studio album by the American singer-songwriter Joanna Newsom, released on February 23, 2010, via Drag City. It is a triple album produced by Newsom and mixed by Newsom's longtime collaborators Jim O'Rourke and Noah Georgeson, with arrangements by Ryan Francesconi.

Have One On Me continues Newsom's use of cryptic, pastoral lyrics, with a further progression of elements of her sound such as the orchestral accompaniment and the arrangements – with the inclusion of diverse instruments like the tambura, the harpsichord and the kaval. The production also flirts with genres such as jazz and blues in some of the tracks, while adding drums and the electric guitar in others. The album is also her first since The Milk-Eyed Mender to include songs played on the piano instead of the harp. Because of health problems, Newsom's voice was damaged during the sessions, consequently affecting the overall recording process and forcing her to change her singing style.

The album title and release date were announced on January 12, 2010, through a comic strip. Information surfaced slowly, mostly being kept secret by the press and Drag City. Advance copies were only sent to music critics a few weeks before its release in an attempt to prevent a leak, since Newsom's previous album leaked months early after it was left unprotected on servers belonging to music review website Pitchfork. It ultimately leaked on February 18, 2010.

Have One On Me was acclaimed, earning Newsom several accolades and favorable comparisons to singer-songwriters such as Judee Sill, Joni Mitchell, Laura Nyro, Rickie Lee Jones and Kate Bush. Conversely, like her previous releases before it, the album has received its share of criticism. The majority of them were made towards its triple disc format – described by some critics as overly ambitious – and some of its tracks' lengths. Commercially the album earned Newsom her best chart positions yet and fared well. In the U.S. Have One On Me debuted and peaked at number 75 on the Billboard 200 and number 16 on the Top Digital Albums, selling more than 7,000 copies in its first week. It also spent four consecutive weeks atop of the Folk Albums chart and peaked inside the top 10 of the Independent Albums chart. In the UK, it peaked at number 28, becoming her second album to reach the top 50. Additionally, Have One On Me is her first chart appearance in Canada.

== Background ==
=== Recording ===
On March 28, 2009, Newsom performed over two hours of new material at a "secret" concert at the Fernwood Resort in Big Sur, California with fellow Nevada City singer-songwriter Mariee Sioux, under the pseudonym The Beatles's. Those in attendance reported that about one-third of her new material was played primarily on piano, with a backing arrangement of banjo, violin, guitar and drums. Plans of recording an album appeared earlier that year with the help of Francesconi and Neal Morgan, who performed the percussion. According to an interview made by Time, the three of them crawled through the songs bar by bar, talking about each of their "meaning, mood and thematic stuff". During the recording, especially when she went to lay the basic vocal tracks, it was discovered that she had lost her voice. This put a freeze on recording the vocals, although she continued to record all of the piano and the harp tracks. By the end of the year she had completed the album and mastered it in Tokyo.

=== Release ===
On January 12, 2010, an entry cryptically titled "@!?*(%$#!!" was posted on the Drag City website where it contained a link leading to a short comic strip titled "Joanna Newsom 'Have One on Me'" with a date of February 23, 2010. It was later confirmed by Spunk, Newsom's Australian label, that the title and date represented the title and release date of Newsom's upcoming album. The album was reportedly to be released in Australia on February 19, 2010, but it was later postponed to February 22. A week later, Clash reported that Newsom's upcoming album would contain the four following tracks: "Jack Rabbits", "Ribbon Bows", "Autumn" and "In California". Newsom also described the album as a "cross between her last two" On January 22 of that same month, less than three days after the interview, Clash removed the article and the interview, citing that "the information given was not part of any exclusive interview with, or authorized, by Joanna Newsom and that the words expressed were solely those of the writer." Also, according to the magazine, "none of the quotes should be credited to Ms. Newsom". They concluded by apologizing to "Ms. Newsom and her record company for any distress caused by the article." That day, NME reported that the album would contain three discs.

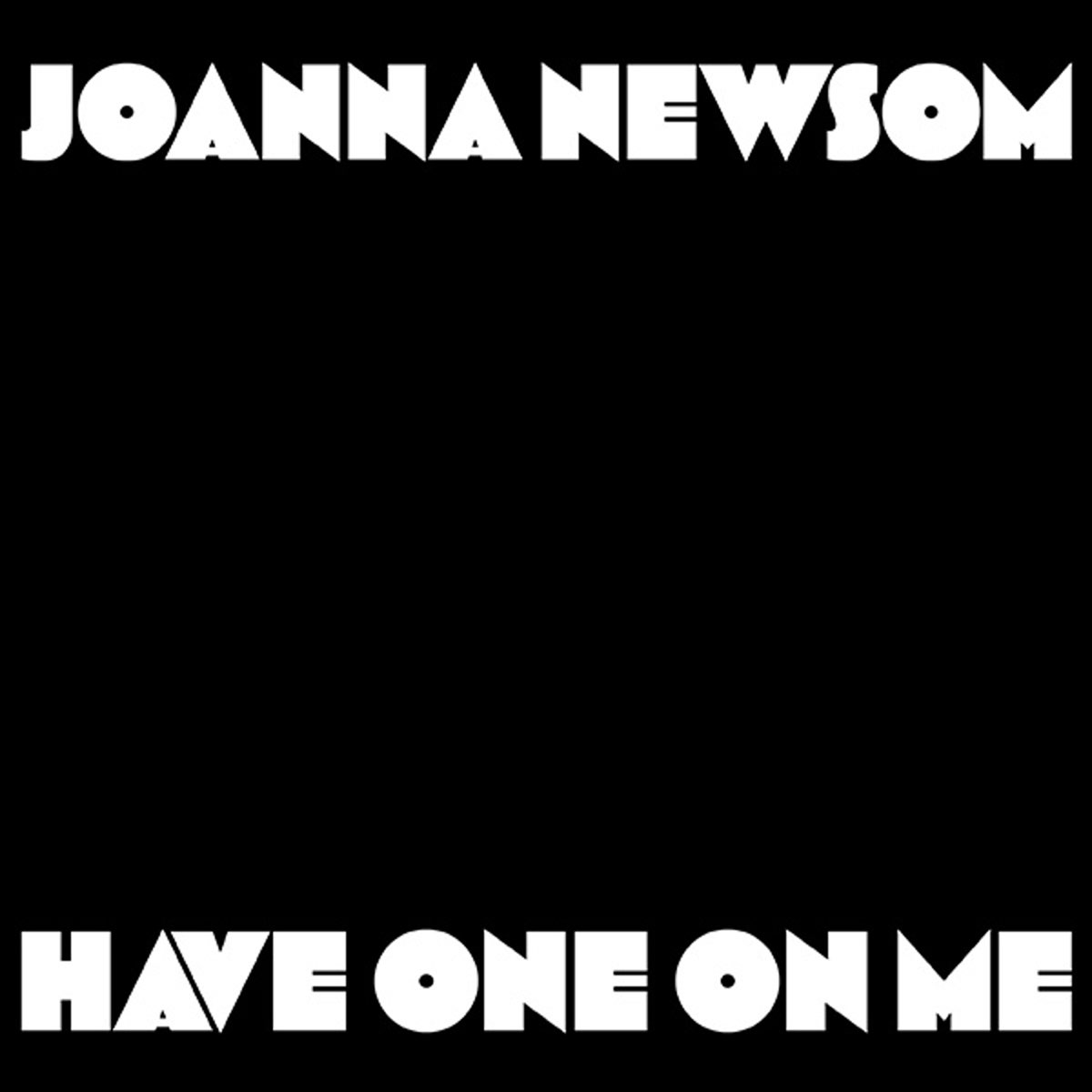
The original black and white cover used by the label at first.

On January 26, the album was made available for pre-order. Pitchfork also reported that Drag City revealed the cover, which the webzine described as "utilitarian cover art, a far cry from the fancy portrait that adorned Ys". It was also confirmed that Have One on Me would be a triple album. At last it was reported that Have One on Me would be released worldwide from February 23, including Australia. Less than a week later, Drag City revealed a new album cover, confirming rumors that the black one released before containing only Joanna's name and the album title was only provisory and not the final design. Pitchfork described it as a "picture of Ms. Newsom lounging amidst too many antiques and animal prints. She looks comfortable."

On February 8, Japanese website Metropolis reported that Have One on Me would be released in Japan on March 4. Also according to the article although "details and samples of the new album have been kept closely under wraps", there was "an invite-only listening party for press last week" that "revealed Have One On Me to be Newsom's magnum opus".

Advance copies were not sent to critics in an effort to avoid a leak according to Uncut; Newsom's previous album, Ys was leaked two months before its original release when it was left unprotected on servers belonging to Pitchfork; However, Have One on Me leaked and became available on P2P networks and BitTorrent on February 18, just days before its official release date.

=== Promotion and touring ===
Drag City streamed three tracks, starting January 26 and ending on February 15, with each one of them being streamed during seven days. "'81" was the first to be streamed at the label's website and the resulting wave of web traffic overloaded their website. On February 2, the label streamed another new track via its website, "Good Intentions Paving Company". Pitchfork awarded the song the "Best New Music" tag. The reviewer compared Newsom favorably to Rickie Lee Jones and suggested that the song "may be the most humanizing song we've heard from Newsom", aside calling it a "rare thing, then-- an unapologetic love song that feels, you know, new." On February 9, the nine-minute "Kingfisher" became the last one released.

Newsom performed "Soft as Chalk" at Late Night with Jimmy Fallon on March 6, 2010. Newsom performed "81" and "Jackrabbits" on Later with Jools Holland on May 4, 2010. Newsom also appeared on the cover of Under the Radar magazine for its May 2010 issue and in the August 2010 issue of Mojo Magazine. On August 12, Newsom performed "You and Me, Bess" and "'81" on Jimmy Kimmel Live! The performance of "You and Me, Bess" was filmed in black-and-white. She also performed in festivals such as the Green Man Festival and All Tomorrow's Parties, the latter curated by Matt Groening also earned her a Simpsons cartoon by Groening. During the tour, Newsom alongside Fleet Foxes's Robin Pecknold performed a cover of Kid Rock's "Picture" to critical acclaim. Also, her song "On a Good Day" was covered by Pecknold and by punk-rock icon Billy Bragg for The Voice Project. Joanna Newsom also performed this song, incorporating a new instrumental section, in December of the same year on the Late Show with David Letterman.

== Reception ==
=== Commercial performance ===
In the week it was released, Have One on Me reached the top 10 of online music stores such as Amazon and iTunes in the U.S. It debuted and peaked at number 16 on the Top Digital Albums chart and at number 7 on the Independent Albums chart. On the Billboard 200, it debuted and peaked at number 75, selling more than five thousand copies, making it not only her highest-charting album, but also her best first week sales yet. It also debuted and peaked atop of the Folk Albums, making Have One on Me her second album to reach the top spot of a Billboard chart. A week later, it fell to number 104 at the first and stayed another week at the top of the latter, becoming, so far, her most successful chart performance. On its third week, the album fell to number 140, though it continued to top the Folk Albums chart. Have One on Me spent a total of four weeks inside the Billboard 200 and it charted inside of the top 40 and the top 5 of the Independent Albums and Folk Albums charts, respectively for a few more weeks. By the end of the year, it had sold more than 50,000 copies in the U.S. alone. The album also became her first chart appearance in Canada, debuting and peaking at number 80.

In Europe, the album also became Newsom's highest chart appearance to date in the majority of the territories, where it peaked at number 46 on the continent's overall chart. In the UK, it debuted and peaked at number 28 selling 8,481 copies that week, her second album to chart inside the top 50, since Ys peaked at number 41 back in 2006. In Ireland, it debuted and peaked at number 24, falling to number 32 a week after its debut. The album peaked inside the top 20 of the Norwegian Album Charts, and reached the top 100 of others such as the Switzerland's, Netherlands's and Belgium's albums charts. The album charted lower than its predecessor in France, where it debuted and peaked at number 171.

=== Critical response ===
Professional ratings
Aggregate scores
Source	Rating
AnyDecentMusic?	8.5/10
Metacritic	85/100
Review scores
Source	Rating
AllMusic	3.5/5 stars
The A.V. Club	B
The Daily Telegraph	4/5 stars
Entertainment Weekly	A−
The Guardian	4/5 stars
Los Angeles Times	4/4 stars
NME	8/10
Pitchfork	9.2/10
Rolling Stone	3.5/5 stars
Spin	8/10

Have One on Me received critical acclaim upon its release, receiving an aggregate score of 85 out of 100 at Metacritic based on 35 reviews, indicating "universal acclaim". Most of the reviews made note of the album's varied styles and sprawling nature, and that while a longer album than Ys the orchestral arrangements are scaled-back and less ornate in comparison to Van Dyke Parks' arrangements on that album. The Observer noted that just as Ys was a considerately more ambitious album than The Milk-Eyed Mender, Have One on Me represented a "correspondingly Knievel-like vault". The Wire magazine as well as several other reviews noted the expansion of Newsom's musical palette to include instruments such as tambura and kaval, while other critics including Pitchfork drew comparison to Joni Mitchell's 1970s material. They also made note of the maturing of Newsom's voice, particularly Ann Powers' review in the Los Angeles Times and Simon Vozick-Levinson in Entertainment Weekly.

Anthony Carew of About.com gave the album five stars, calling Have One on Me "colossal" and "all of the tremors and squeaks of her original screech have been smoothed out, her polished-stone voice rolling syllables into honeyed slurs", aside concluding that "armed with more beautiful singing, more rich orchestration, and more open emotion, there's not a difficult note on here; it's two hours amounting to a staggering portrait of an artist defiantly staking her claim as one of the greatest of the 21st century." Philip Cosores of Consequence of Sound also gave the album a perfect score claiming that "records like Have One on Me are why [perfect scores] exist". The reviewer also wrote favorably about its production and songwriting referring to them as "emotional moments, moments you can't help but imagine being moved to tears, even if you are not actually moved to do so". John Mulvey of Uncut went even further writing that Have One on Me "sounds very much like a second masterpiece: a different kind of epic to Ys, and one with enough hooks and charms to ensnare at least a few Newsom agnostics" while Louis Pattison of BBC felt that "as an album, it is huge, sometimes overwhelming – but such is the strength and individuality of Newsom's vision, it seems almost inconceivable she could produce anything unremarkable". The New York Times's Jon Pareles pointed that she "has discovered how to open up her music: to let it whisper and swell, to be swept into the purely musical pleasures of an ingenious arrangement or to let simplicity and silence speak for her." The Irish Times gave the album five stars assuming that although "triple albums are a risk, Newsom pulls this off beautifully."

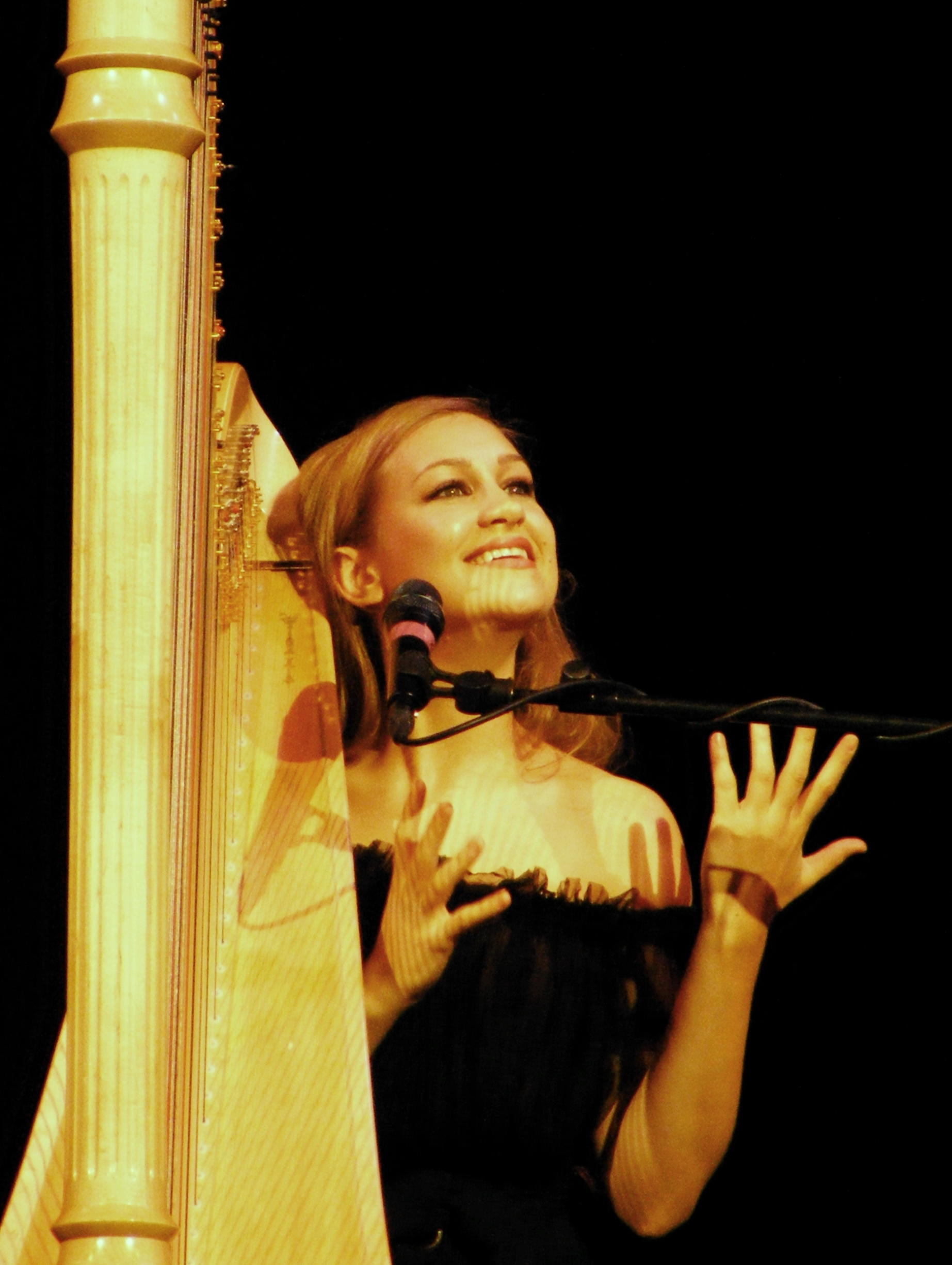
Joanna Newsom at the Palace Theatre, Manchester, on the 18th of September 2010.

Allison Stewart of The Washington Post called Have One on Me "her magnum opus, a three-disc set being likened to a freak-folk Sandinista!, though it feels more like a musical Ulysses." musicOMH's Darren Harvey awarded the album five stars recognized that it is "winding, long-winded, densely poetic, and often challenging", but "never tedious or self-indulgent", an opinion also shared by Dan Cairns of The Times. James Reed of the Boston Globe wrote favorably about its production stating that "she could have easily overstuffed these songs, like the dizzying album cover, but instead Newsom keeps a tight grip on the music's dramatic arcs. Songs tend to open with a simple melody on harp or piano before plummeting into countless rabbit holes".

Mark Richardson of Pitchfork gave the album 9.2 out of 10. He wrote that "The highlights are spread out evenly, and Newsom couldn't have sequenced the record any better," and, referring to lyrics from the opening track echoed in the closer, "it reinforces just how many threads she's weaved between those songs and how incredible it is to discover new things with every listen. Paste Magazine's Jeff Vrabel referred to it as a "panoramic dreamworld" and wrote that "Have One on Me is packed with magic." Jim Scott of Under the Radar awarded the album 9 out of 10 stating that Newsom "has never been one of those artists who leave the listener wanting more, knowing that there's more to give." To him, "the massive amount of material contained in Have One On Me will take a long time to digest. Perhaps as long as it takes her to produce another album". Drowned in Sound also gave the same rating and praised Newsom's vocals and lyrics, while the former being described as "winsome and technically much improved" and the latter being pointed as "one of her strongest points." To the reviewer the album is "for now, a stunning and ambitious piece of work; one for the ages". Sputnikmusic rated the album 4½ stars out of 5 commenting that "it's been a long time since an album like this was released: an album that is intensely personal even if you can't relate to the lyrics, even if you've never been in love, even if you've never lost something, even if you've never really felt alive." To Chris Parkin of Yahoo!, Have One on Me is "nothing short of remarkable", while No Ripcord awarded the album a full score, a second for Newsom, referring to it as "one of the finest albums of this, or any, year."

Spin's Andy Beta expressed that Newsom "gives what few artists can deliver: a self-contained world of warmth, crystalline detail, and intimacy that lies far beyond a Twitter feed." in his four star review. Q Magazine gave the same rating and shared a similar opinion commenting that "Have One on Me is a record so richly involving that it promises to throw up fresh delights weeks, or even months, down the line." NME stated in its 8/10 review that "most bands don't make that many great songs in their whole darned career." Simmy Richman of The Independent described it as "a monumental work in more ways than one." Will Dean of The Guardian pointed that "at two-hours-plus, it's a record that demands concentration to appreciate its splatterings of beauty. But pour yourself a glass and listen, because they don't make them like this too often." Will Hermes of Rolling Stone awarded the album 3½ stars out of 5 praising the lyrics and believing that it "firmly establishes her as a singer-songwriter to be reckoned with", while the German version of the same magazine gave Have One on Me 4½ stars and placed Newsom as the cover story of its March issue. Giving it 3½ stars, Heather Phares of AllMusic commented that "the first disc presents Newsom's biggest departures", but that "the album's cross between The Milk-Eyed Mender and Ys isn't always greater than the sum of its parts". Andy Battaglia of The A.V. Club gave it a B grade and wrote that "Have One on Me doesn't hold out any clear organizational structure to cinch it all together. Or at least it hasn't yet", while Greg Kot of the Chicago Tribune in his 2½ out of 4 stars review commented that "history tells us that most triple albums could've benefited from some pruning, and Have One on Me is no exception."

As with Newsom's other studio albums, Have One on Me has received criticism and mixed to negative reviews. Slant Magazine's Matthew Cole rated it two stars out of five. Cole said it was "remarkable how little narrative arc develops either within or between songs," and that most of the album plays out with "moments of inspired performance scattered haphazardly throughout tracks that just don't feel like they've been thought through." He went on to call the record "a strange, and strangely pretentious mess: an album pitted deep in the psychic world of stories that nonetheless can't figure out when it should begin, when it should end, or which parts are even worth the audience's attention." Matthew Fiander of PopMatters gave the album 4 out of 10 points and described the songs as "formless", although he recognized that there were standout tracks, and some of them came at least close of others songs by Newsom such as "Only Skin". He also expressed disappointment, commenting that "it's too bad really, that Have One on Me is so overdone because there's a decent album hidden somewhere in there. It's an album the Newsom we saw in 2006 would have found, formed, and made shine". In contrast, Zach Schonfeld of the same website has been more positive towards the album while reviewing one of her concerts, describing it as "the closest Newsom will come to a Blood on the Tracks — a confessional opus, straight from the gut."

=== Accolades ===
Publication	Accolade	Rank
About	Best Records of 2010	#1
Blow Up Magazine	Top 10 Albums of 2010	#3
Consequence of Sound	Top 100 Albums of 2010	#24
Consequence of Sound	Top 50 Songs of 2010 (for Baby Birch)	#24
Delusions of Adequacy	Top Albums of 2010	#50
Drowned in Sound	Top Albums of 2010	#34
Exclaim!	Top Albums of 2010	#12
Gaffa	Top 50 Albums of 2010	#13
Gorilla vs. Bear	Best Albums of 2010	#5
The Guardian	Top 40 Albums of 2010	#28
Les Inrockuptibles	Top 100 Albums of 2010	#41
The Line of Best Fit	Top 50 Albums of 2010	#27
Los Angeles Times	Ann Powers's Top 10 Picks of 2010	#2
Los Angeles Times	Randall Roberts's Top 10 Albums of 2010	#4
Mojo	Best Albums of 2010	#13
musicOMH	Top 50 Albums of 2010	#17
Musikexpress	Top 50 Albums of 2010	#29
Muso's Guide	Top 40 Albums of 2010	#2
The New York Times	Top 10 Albums of 2010	#3
NME	Albums of 2010	#57
No Ripcord	Top 50 Albums of 2010	#17
The Observer	Top 5 Albums of 2010	#1
OneThirtyBPM	The Best 50 Albums of 2010	#20
OneThirtyBPM	Best Singles of 2010 (for Baby Birch)	#31
OOR	Top 50 Albums of 2010	#18
Other Music	Best of 2010	#7
Pitchfork Media	The Top 50 Albums of 2010	#7
Pitchfork Media	The Top 100 Tracks of 2010 (for Good Intentions Paving Company)	#7
Pitchfork Media	The Top 100 Albums of the Decade So Far (2010–2014)	#18
Pitchfork Media	The 200 Best Songs of the 2010s (for Good Intentions Paving Company)	#29
Pitchfork Media	The 200 Best Albums of the 2010s	#16
Playground	Top 100 Albums of 2010	#46
Playground	The Top 100 Tracks of 2010 (for Good Intentions Paving Company)	#74
PopMatters	The Best 70 Albums of 2010	#13
PopMatters	Best Singles of 2010 (for Good Intentions Paving Company)	#18
Prefix	Best Albums of 2010	#13
Pretty Much Amazing	Top 50 Albums of 2010	#10
Q	Top Albums of 2010	#46
Rate Your Music	Top Albums of 2010	#2
Rockdelux	Top 50 Albums of 2010	#16
Rolling Stone	Rolling Stone Germany Top Albums of 2010	#4
Rolling Stone	Will Hermes's 10 Albums of 2010	#5
Rolling Stone	Will Hermes's Top 10 Singles of 2010 (for Good Intentions Paving Company)	#3
Rolling Stone	Jody Rosen's Top 10 Albums of 2010	#4
Rough Trade	Best Albums of 2010	#25
The Skinny	Best Records of 2010	#1
Sputnikmusic	Top 50 Albums of 2010	#10
State	Best Records of 2010	#40
Stereogum	Top Albums of 2010	#11
Stereogum	Gummy Awards	#8
The Sun	The Best 50 Albums of 2010	#18
The Sun	Best Singles of 2010 (for Good Intentions Paving Company)	#11
Tiny Mix Tapes	Favorite 50 Albums of 2010	#7
Treble	The Top 50 Albums of 2010	#13
Uncut	Top Albums of 2010	#1
Under the Radar	Top 50 Albums of 2010	#12
Village Voice	Pazz & Jop Top 50 Albums of 2010	#14
Wire	Top Albums of 2010	#4

Year	Award	Category	Result
2010	MOJO Awards	Best Album	Nominated

== Track listing ==
All songs written by Joanna Newsom.

Disc 1
No.	Title	Length
1.	"Easy"	6:04
2.	"Have One on Me"	11:02
3.	"'81"	3:51
4.	"Good Intentions Paving Co."	7:02
5.	"No Provenance"	6:25
6.	"Baby Birch"	9:30
Total length:		43:54

Disc 2
No.	Title	Length
1.	"On a Good Day"	1:48
2.	"You and Me, Bess"	7:12
3.	"In California"	8:41
4.	"Jackrabbits"	4:23
5.	"Go Long"	8:02
6.	"Occident"	5:37
Total length:		35:43

Disc 3
No.	Title	Length
1.	"Soft as Chalk"	6:29
2.	"Esme"	7:56
3.	"Autumn"	8:01
4.	"Ribbon Bows"	6:10
5.	"Kingfisher"	9:11
6.	"Does Not Suffice"	6:44
Total length:		44:31

== Personnel ==
=== Performance ===
- Joanna Newsom – harp, piano, vocals
- Alex Camphouse – horn
- Dan Cantrell – piano, hammond organ, pump organ, harpsichord, accordion
- Patrick Cress – bass clarinet
- Ryan Francesconi – Bulgarian tambura, kaval, acoustic guitar, electric guitar, electric bass, banjo, mandolin, soprano recorder
- Sascha Groschang – cello
- Djeina Haruta – viola
- Shawn Jones – bassoon
- Shira Kammen – vielle, rebec
- Dan Koretzky – timpani
- Katie Kresek – violin
- Judith Linsenberg – alto, tenor and bass recorder
- Kane Mathis – kora
- Greg Moore – backing vocals
- Thom Moore – backing vocals
- Neal Morgan – drum set, percussion, timpani, backing vocals
- David Morris – viola da Gamba
- Yeolim Nam – violin
- Eric Oberthaler – trumpet, cornet
- Philip Payton – violin
- Laura Reynolds – oboe
- Andrew Roitstein – double bass
- Phaedon Sinis – flute, tarhu, kemence
- Lily Storm – backing vocals
- Andrew Strain – trombone

=== Production ===
- Joanna Newsom – producer, songwriter, harp, piano, and vocal arrangements
- Ryan Francesconi – arrangements, conductor
- Noah Georgeson – mixing
- Jim O'Rourke – mixing
- Steve Rooke – mastering
- Becca Mann – cover art
- Annabel Mehran – photographer
- Greg Moore – additional arrangements
- Thom Moore – additional arrangements
- Neal Morgan – drum and percussion arrangements, additional arrangements
- Dan Osborn – layout designer
- Lila Sklar – additional arrangements
- Corinna Taylor – calligraphy

== Charts ==
Chart (2010)	Peak position
Australian Albums (ARIA)	62
Austrian Albums Chart	49
Belgium Ultratop	46
Canadian Albums Chart	80
German Albums Chart	40
European Top 100 Albums	46
French Albums Chart	171
Irish Albums Chart	24
Norwegian Albums Chart	16
Netherlands MegaCharts	54
Swedish Albums Chart	54
Swiss Music Charts	75
UK Albums Chart	28
US Billboard 200	74
US Americana/Folk Albums (Billboard)	1
US Independent Albums (Billboard)	7

== Release history ==
Region	Date	Label	Format	Catalogue
Australia	February 22, 2010	Spunk Records	CD/Vinyl/Digital	URA321
North America	February 23, 2010	Drag City Records	CD/Vinyl/Digital	DC390
Germany	February 26, 2010	Rough Trade Records	CD/Vinyl/Digital	
United Kingdom	March 1, 2010	Drag City Records	CD/Vinyl/Digital	DC390
Japan	March 3, 2010	P-Vine Records	CD/Vinyl/Digital	
France	March 8, 2010	Drag City Records	CD/Vinyl/Digital	
