= Divers (album) =

Studio album by Joanna Newsom
- Released: October 23, 2015
- Genres: Indie folk; chamber pop; Progressive rock
- Length: 51:52
- Label: Drag City
- Producers: Joanna Newsom; Noah Georgeson

Joanna Newsom chronology
Have One on Me (2010)	Divers (2015)

Singles from Divers
- 1. "Sapokanikan" Released: August 10, 2015; 2. "Leaving the City" Released: September 20, 2015

Divers is the fourth studio album by American musician Joanna Newsom, released on October 23, 2015, on Drag City.

The album was revealed on August 10, 2015, along with its first song, "Sapokanikan", which was released digitally as the first single. The cover art, album packaging, and music video for the album's title track feature the work of artist Kim Keever. The music video was directed by Paul Thomas Anderson with whom Newsom worked for the film Inherent Vice.

Speaking about the album's creative process in an interview with Entertainment Weekly, she said "I ... spent a year or two on the instrumental arrangements and overdubs. I wanted the character and colors of the instrumentation to shift definitively, from song to song, which entailed a wide pool of collaborators and a lengthy collaborative process with each person." She further described the process of making the album as "probably the most fun I’ve had making a record". Entertainment Weekly also reported Newsom "as using an arsenal of nearly a dozen keyboards and synths including clavichords, Mellotrons and Marxophones" for the album while members of the City of Prague Philharmonic Orchestra feature as players on the album.

== Critical reception ==
Professional ratings
Aggregate scores
Source	Rating
AnyDecentMusic?	8.6/10
Metacritic	88/100
Review scores
Source	Rating
AllMusic	4/5 stars
The A.V. Club	B+
The Daily Telegraph	4/5 stars
Entertainment Weekly	A−
The Guardian	4/5 stars
The Independent	4/5 stars
NME	4/5
Pitchfork	8.5/10
Rolling Stone	4/5 stars
Spin	8/10

Divers received widespread critical acclaim, achieving an aggregate score of 88 on Metacritic based upon 33 reviews. It receives a similarly high score of 8.6 on AnyDecentMusic?, with the collated scores of thirty-five reviews. Critics praised the complexity of Newsom's lyrics and arrangements, while noting that the record is more accessible and compact than previous releases. In a positive review for Exclaim!, Stephen Carlick wrote that "Divers feels like the culmination of all of Newsom's incredible work over the past decade. It's the sound of an artist operating at the peak of her powers, employing all her greatest strengths at once to create an assured, moving work that corroborates what Have One On Me already suggested: that Joanna Newsom is one of the finest songwriters of this generation." Another positive review, by Ben Ratliff in The New York Times, described, "Almost nothing in the way this music is composed, produced (by Ms. Newsom and Noah Georgeson) or recorded (by Steve Albini and Mr. Georgeson) seems incidental or accidental. You almost want to hold the whole thing still, flatten it out and study it."

Pitchfork awarded the album the 'Best New Music' tag, and stated that "on her fourth album, Divers, Joanna Newsom comes down in size if not scope". They go on to describe the record as "a love letter in the form of a reckoning with death, Divers deals with making tangible the huge mass of impending doom about the loss of love. You know, the small stuff. It's a gorgeous record, full of her usual harp wilyness and baroque rhythms".

James Skinner, writing for Drowned in Sound, concluded by saying that the record is, "Conveyed with sincerity, warmth and the musicianship and love of language and storytelling that sets - has always set - Joanna Newsom apart, Divers is a colossal achievement." Skinner awarded the album full marks. The Skinny also gave the record a perfect score, saying that after listening to the record, "It'll be hard not to conclude that this is surely one of the albums of the year".

=== Accolades ===
Accolades for Divers
Publication	Accolade	Year	Rank
Drowned in Sound	Drowned in Sound's Favourite Albums of the Year 2015	2015	7
Exclaim!	Exclaim!'s Top 10 Folk & Country Albums 2015	2015	2
Flood Magazine	Flood's Best of 2015	2015	9
The Guardian	The Best Albums of 2015	2015	10
Magnet	Magnet's Top 25 Albums of 2015	2015	6
musicOMH	musicOMH's Top 50 Albums of 2015	2015	4
NME	NME's Albums of the Year 2015	2015	17
No Ripcord	Top Albums of 2015	2015	8
Pitchfork	The 50 Best Albums of 2015	2015	13
Pitchfork	Readers' Top 50 Albums	2015	10
Stereogum	The 50 Best Albums of 2015	2015	22
The Wire	Releases of the Year 1–50	2015	14

== Commercial performance ==
Newsom achieved her first No. 1 on Billboard's Alternative Albums chart with the album, which sold 14,000 units in its first week. It marked Newsom's best career sales week, topping the first week sales of 2006's Ys, which sold 9,000. Divers also debuted at No. 2 on the Vinyl Albums chart, with 3,000 LPs sold.

== Track listing ==
The track listing was officially announced by Drag City on August 10, 2015.

All songs written by Joanna Newsom, except "Same Old Man" (traditional).

No.	Title	Length
1.	"Anecdotes"	6:27
2.	"Sapokanikan"	5:11
3.	"Leaving the City"	3:48
4.	"Goose Eggs"	5:01
5.	"Waltz of the 101st Lightborne"	5:22
6.	"The Things I Say"	2:35
7.	"Divers"	7:07
8.	"Same Old Man"	2:26
9.	"You Will Not Take My Heart Alive"	4:01
10.	"A Pin-Light Bent"	4:26
11.	"Time, as a Symptom"	5:28
Total length:		51:52

== Personnel ==
=== Performance ===
- Joanna Newsom – harp, piano, Roland Juno-106, Minimoog, Schiedmayer celesta, Santoor, Mellotron (MK II and M400), Wurlitzer electric piano, Neupert clavichord, Fender Rhodes piano with bass, Baldwin electric harpsichord, Baldwin Discoverer electronic organ, Estey pump organ, guitaret, and vocals
- Dan Cantrell – Hammond organ, piano accordion, Andes recorder-keyboard, musical saw
- Ryan Francesconi – electric guitar, electric bass, bouzouki, bağlama
- Kevin Barker – electric guitar, banjo
- Judith Linsenberg – alto, tenor and bass recorder
- Logan Coale – double bass
- David Nelson – trombone
- Andy Strain – trombone
- Ben Russell – violin
- Rob Moose – violin
- Matthew Slemela – violin
- Nadia Sirota – viola
- Hideaki Aomori – clarinet, bass clarinet
- James Smith – English horn
- Peter Newsom – drums
- Neal Morgan – drums

=== Production ===
- Joanna Newsom – producer, songwriter, harp, piano, keyboard and vocal arrangements
- Steve Albini – engineer
- Ryan Francesconi – arrangements, conductor
- Noah Georgeson – engineer, producer and mixing
- John Golden – mastering
- Kim Keever – cover art
- Samur Khouja – engineer
- Annabel Mehran – photographer
- Paul Thomas Anderson – photographer
- Nico Muhly – orchestral arrangements on "Anecdotes"
- David Longstreth – orchestral arrangements on "Time, As a Symptom"
- Ryan Francesconi – additional arrangements
- Dan Cantrell – additional arrangements
- Noah Georgeson – additional arrangements
- Kevin Barker – additional arrangements
- Neal Morgan – drum and percussion arrangements
- Peter Newsom – drum and percussion arrangements
- Dan Osborn – layout designer
- Justin Rice – engineer
- Sadaharu Yagi – engineer

== Charts ==
Chart performance for Divers
Chart (2015)	Peak position
Australian Albums (ARIA)	63
Austrian Albums (Ö3 Austria)	30
Belgian Albums (Ultratop Flanders)	25
Belgian Albums (Ultratop Wallonia)	70
Canadian Albums (Billboard)	81
Dutch Albums (Album Top 100)	14
French Albums (SNEP)	168
German Albums (Offizielle Top 100)	22
Irish Albums (IRMA)	8
Italian Albums (FIMI)	93
Norwegian Albums (VG-lista)	26
Spanish Albums (Promusicae)	91
Swiss Albums (Schweizer Hitparade)	56
UK Albums (Official Charts)	10
US Billboard 200	30
US Top Alternative Albums (Billboard)	1
US Americana/Folk Albums (Billboard)	1
US Independent Albums (Billboard)	2
