= What We Have Known =

Single by Joanna Newsom
- Released: July 19, 2011
- Genre: Indie folk
- Length: 6:06
- Label: Drag City
- Songwriter(s): Joanna Newsom
- Producer(s): Noah Georgeson

Joanna Newsom singles chronology
| "Sprout and the Bean" (2004) | "What We Have Known" (2011) |

"What We Have Known" is a single by American singer-songwriter Joanna Newsom, released on Drag City on July 19, 2011. The song originally appeared on the 2003 EP Yarn and Glue, and was re-recorded as the B-side to the 2004 single "Sprout and the Bean" before being released on its own 12-inch vinyl in 2011. One side of the vinyl is playable, while the other side has an etching. The cover artwork was designed by Becca Mann. It peaked at number 20 on the UK Physical Singles Chart.

== Track listing ==
| No. | Title | Writer(s) | Length |
|---|---|---|---|
| 1. | "What We Have Known" | Joanna Newsom | 6:06 |

== Charts ==
| Chart (2011) | Peak position |
|---|---|
| UK Physical Singles (OCC) | 20 |
