= Two Wings (band) =

Scottish rock band

Two Wings is a Scottish rock band formed in 2009 in Glasgow, Scotland.

The band was created when founder member of Nalle, Hanna Tuulikki, and former Trembling Bells guitarist, Ben Reynolds, began a songwriting collaboration. Their debut album, Love's Spring, was released in 2012 on Tin Angel Records. The band played a short UK tour with labelmate Doug Tielli, followed by a longer run of dates with Canadian guitarist Eric Chenaux. They released their latest album A Wake in 2014.

== Current members ==
- Hanna Tuulikki
- Ben Reynolds
- Lucy Duncombe
- Kenny Wilson
- Owen Curtis Williams

== Releases ==
- Love's Spring (2012)
- A Wake (2014)
