= By Chance Upon Waking =

Studio album by Nalle
- Released: 2006
- Genre: Psychedelic folk, drone, improvisational music
- Label: Pickled Egg Records EGG 57CD

Professional ratings
Review scores
Source	Rating
PopMatters	(8/10)
Trouser Press	Positive
Collected Sounds	Positive

By Chance Upon Waking is the debut album by Nalle. The album was released in 2006 on the Pickled Egg Records label.

== Track listing ==
1. "Sunne Song" - (4:46)
2. "Midwinter's Dream" - (3:38)
3. "Iron's Oath" - (6:14)
4. "Sea Change" - (2:34)
5. "Forest-Mountain" - (6:25)
6. "New Roots" - (4:21)
7. "Birth of the Bear (Ursa minor)" - (8:13)
8. "Ravens" - (5:19)

== Downloadable songs ==
- "Sunne Song"
- "Iron's Oath"
- "New Roots"
