= Find Shelter =

Album by Noah Georgeson

Studio album by Noah Georgeson
- Released: November 14, 2006
- Recorded: 1999–2003
- Genre: Folk rock, acoustic, freak folk
- Label: Plain Recordings/IODA
- Producer: Noah Georgeson

Noah Georgeson chronology
Find Shelter	Incumbent

Professional ratings
Review scores
Source	Rating
Allmusic	Link
mxdwn	(not rated) Link

Find Shelter is the debut album from American musician and producer Noah Georgeson.

== Track listing ==
1. "Tied to the Mountains" – 2:20
2. "Walking on Someone Else's Name" – 3:04
3. "Find Shelter" – 2:37
4. "Build and Work" – 2:48
5. "Hand Me, Please, A City" – 2:04
6. "Priests of Cholera" – 4:03
7. "Glorious Glory" – 3:07
8. "Anvil" – 3:22
9. "Wooden Empire" – 2:57
10. "Shawm Overture" – 0:42
11. "Tied to the Coast" – 4:26
12. "Angry Afternoon" – 3:42
