= Tarhu =

The tarhu (also spelled tarhou) is a type of string instrument invented by Australian musician and craftsman Peter Biffin during the 1980s. The tarhu has a long slender neck made of Blackwood, a small round body also made of Blackwood, and four strings about the length of 80 cm It is a flexible instrument that can be played in both plucked and bowed styles derived from both eastern and western cultures.

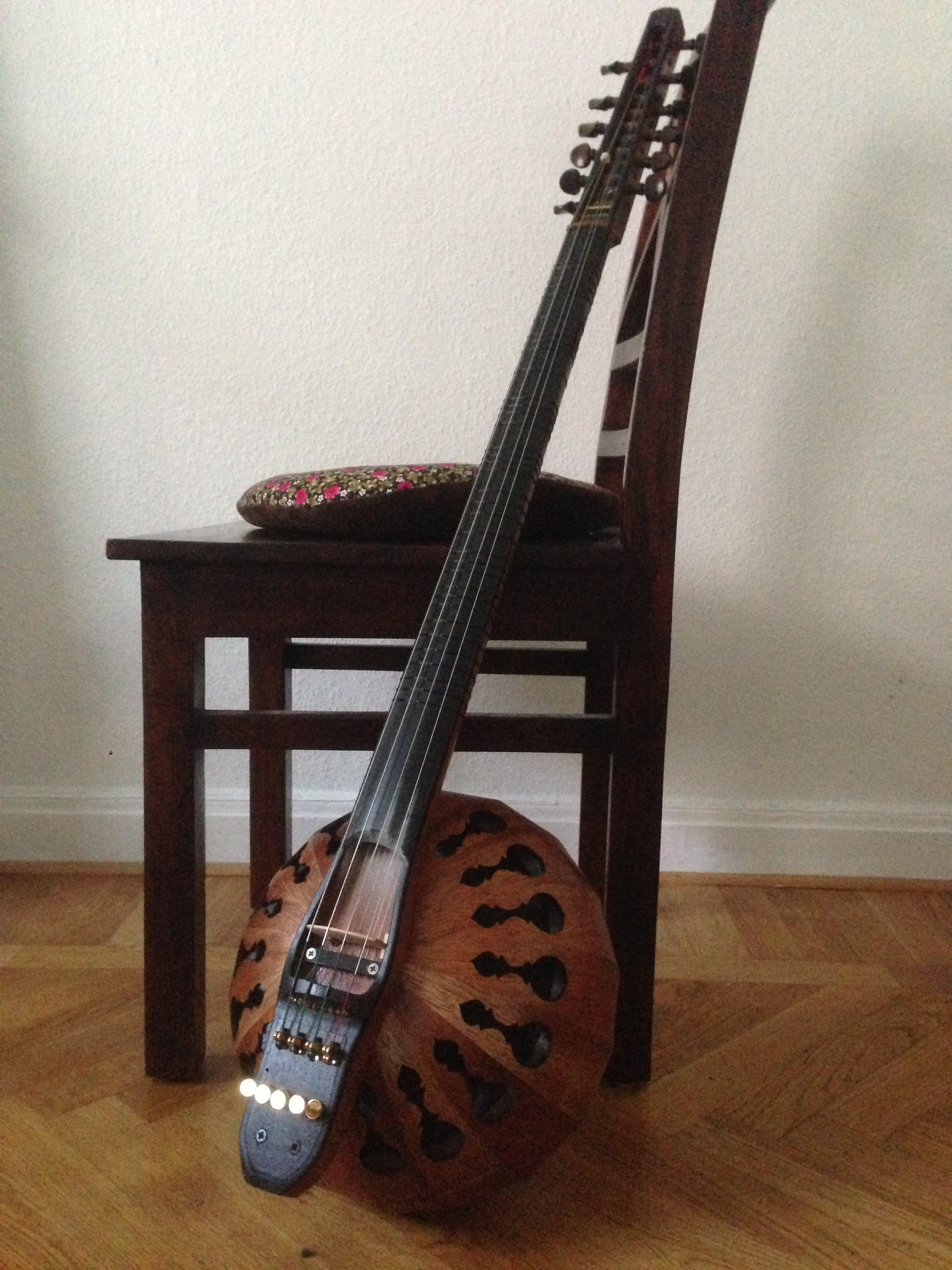
Long Neck Tarhu by Mazdak Ferydooni

== History and development ==
The first tarhu prototype was created in 1995, though it was preceded by a number of experimentations with the traditional instruments erhu (China) and yaylı tambur (Turkey) (appropriately, the name tarhu is a portmanteau of the two). Biffin also quotes a wide range of other ancient and modern stringed instruments from both eastern and western traditions, such as the Turkish tambur, the north Indian veena, the Persian kamancha, the middle-eastern duduk, and the double bass, as sources of inspiration, and names a great many musicians and luthiers who played a role in the instrument's development. For example, one of the key elements – the lightweight speaker-like cone – was the result of work some 20 years earlier with colleague Greg Smallman.

In 1984, Biffin created a modified yaylı tambur featuring a redesigned body which allowed for the bowing of more than one string simultaneously and the addition of a sound post within the body. It had three playing strings and three sympathetic strings in a channel down the middle of the neck. It was not until 1992 that Biffin experimented with a modified erhu. His creation entailed a configuration in which the strings were pressed against a fingerboard (rather than 'fretting' the string mid-air as with the traditional erhu), so as to make it more playable for violinists. Biffin reports that this line of research was fruitful in understanding erhu acoustics. From here, Biffin produced in 1993 the "bowtar" and in 1994 the "cone-erhu", both based on erhu principles; the former using a gourd resonator and the latter being more of a sculptural study. These also helped Biffin to understand the limitations of certain elements of the erhu in relation to the dynamic range he was trying to achieve. Following the creation of the first tarhu prototype in 1995, where "the desire to integrate the Tanbur and Erhu threads of research gave birth to the use of a larger cone and a new bridge design", some of the key elements of the new instrument were now in place; notably the unique bridge setup: "While the Tarhu bridge/cone configuration does not include a sound-post as such, the bridge design performs the same function as a sound-post by transferring vibrations from one plane to another", but also the configuration of four playing strings and eight sympathetic strings and indeed the lightweight cone.

The tarhui and tenor tarhu, produced in 1998, marked the emergence of the aesthetic ideas now used in the tarhu, with a spherical body constructed of wooden ribs. Biffin then made a series of long-neck tarhus from 1999 to 2003, based on the format of the yaylı tambur. Many of the tarhus built thereafter were made for specific artists, and are designs that are still kept today:

2003: kamancha tarhu with sympathetic strings (Kayhan Kalhor)

2004: kamancha tarhu (Habil Aliyev)

2006: nak tarhu (Ross Daly)

2007: cellhu (Rali Margalit)

2008: shah kaman (Kayhan Kalhor)

2009: kamancha tarhu with alternative sound hole design (Imamyar Hasanov)

Over the course of the instrument's young history, Biffin has constructed 19 different models. Today, the bespoke tarhu instruments are championed most notably by the aforementioned musicians, though their popularity is growing and new exponents are constantly emerging.

In more recent years, Iranian luthier Mazdak Fereydooni has also begun work on the tarhu at the Labyrinth Musical Workshop on Crete, and has been producing a number of different models under the supervision of Ross Daly. In 2014, musicians Michalis Cholevas and Ross Daly collaborated with Fereydooni to make a new version of the long-neck Tarhu, shorter than the original one made by Peter Biffin by 1/5. The shorter neck enables faster phrasing and easier balancing.

== Characteristics ==
With Islamic architecture and the shell of a sea urchin as the primary inspiration for the frame of the tarhu, it incorporates carving within the main wooden body of the instrument to resemble those features The design creates extremely sensitive instruments with an unprecedented range of sound for long-necked stringed instruments. The efficiency of the cone system gives these instruments a very large dynamic range, and one can create a diversity of different sound. The long-neck is suitable for styles from East and West, using either bow, several different forms of plectra or fingerstyle. The use of four strings facilitates playing across the strings (similar to the string-crossing techniques in the violin family), and extends the range of easily available notes to nearly 4½ octaves.
