= Lena Fayre =

American singer-songwriter

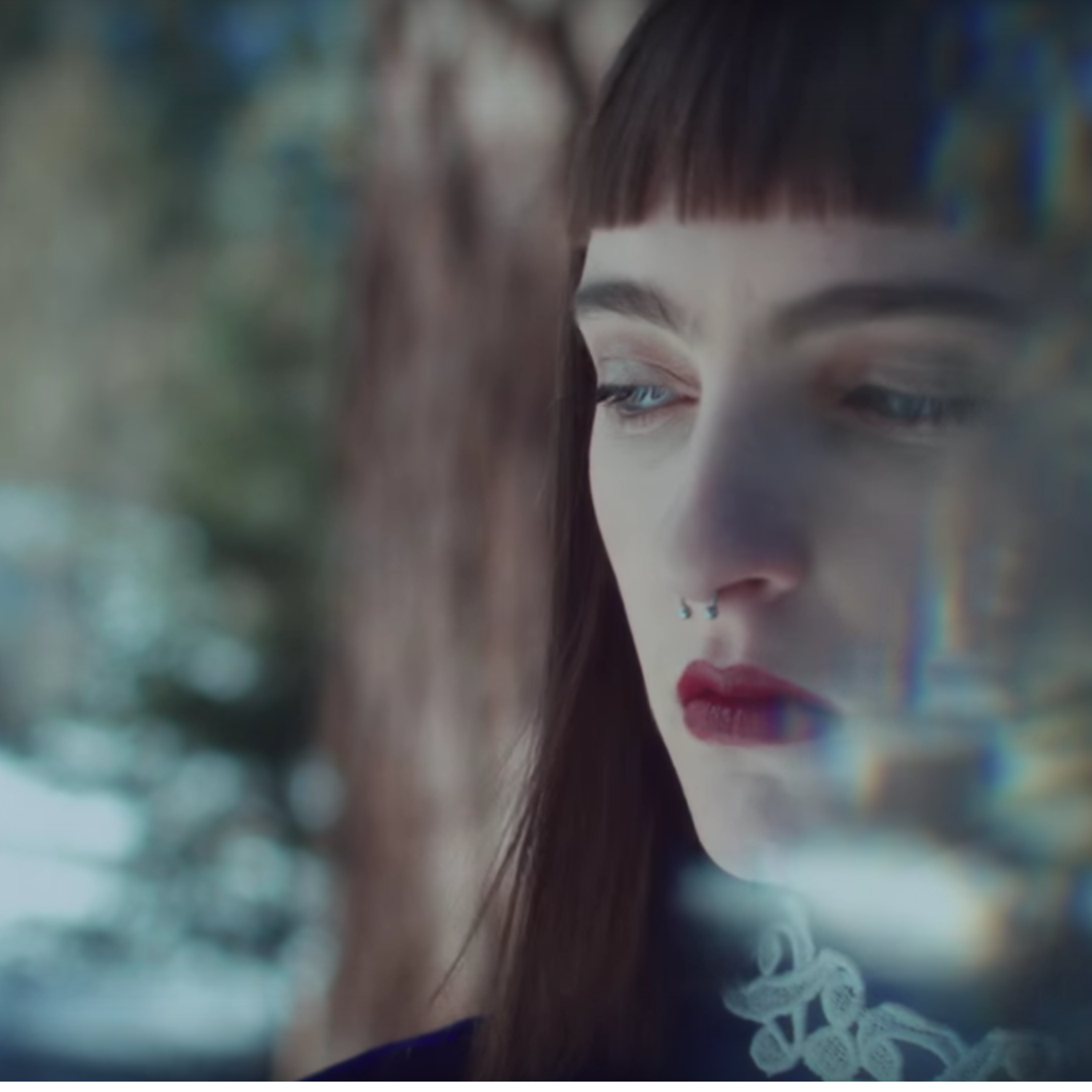
- Fayre in 2016

Background information
- Genres: Indie pop
- Occupation: Singer-songwriter
- Instrument: Vocals
- Years active: 2012–present
- Labels: Semper Augustus Records
- Website: lenafayre.com

Lena Fayre, (pronounced "Lay-nah Fair") is an American singer-songwriter from Los Angeles, California.

== Career ==
Fayre released her debut single, "Belong to You", in December 2012. Weeks later, she issued a video for the song and won Best Music Video at the 2013 Williamsburg International Film Festival.

In June 2013, Fayre published a five-track self-titled EP that included "Belong to You". A few weeks later, she uploaded a music video for another song from her EP, titled "Jukebox Love". In August 2013, the Unsigned Only Music Competition announced that Fayre finished second in the Teen category of its 2013 edition, with her song "Silver", also from the same EP. In November 2013, Fayre released a video for yet another song off her EP, titled "Love Burning Alive". The album also caught the attention of the music press, with Rolling Stone magazine featuring her in a February 2014 online article headlined "10 New Artists You Need to Know".

In July 2014, Fayre issued a single titled "I Am Not a Man", which was included on her debut album, titled Oko, released in August 2014. To promote Oko, Fayre performed at venues throughout Southern California in 2014, impressing music bloggers. In September 2014, Fayre released a music video for "I Am Not a Man". In November 2014, she uploaded a video with an acoustic version of one of the songs from Oko, titled "Start a War". Months later, she released a video for a third song from the album, called "Everybody's In".

Fayre published a single titled "This World" in February 2015. Spotify included it in a curated playlist titled Women of Indie & Alternative, and the song was also featured in an episode of the CW network show The Vampire Diaries. Almost concurrently, Fayre released a video for "This World".

In May 2015, the American Society of Composers, Authors and Publishers (ASCAP) announced that Fayre was a winner of their 2015 "I Create Music" EXPO Opportunity in Los Angeles.

In April 2015, Fayre performed live at SXSW in Austin, Texas, for Daytrotter. On May 20, 2015, Noisey, a website owned by VICE, premiered "Do You Like That?", a track from Fayre's EP Is There Only One?, and announced that the EP would be released in late July 2015. On June 15, 2015, SPIN premiered a second track from the album, titled "Colors of Leaving".

After a month-long residency at Bootleg Theater in Hollywood in February 2016, Fayre was an Official Showcase Artist at SXSW in March 2016. Also in the same month, she won two songwriting awards: Grand Prize Winner in Session II of the John Lennon Songwriting Contest in the World Music Category, for her song "Ophelia", and Winner of "LOVE", a songwriting contest organized by the John Lennon Songwriting Contest in partnership with American Heart Association and Women's International Music Network. Fayre won the latter contest with her song "Love Burning Alive" and was invited to perform at the Grammy Museum for the American Heart Association's Rock the Red event in late April 2016.

== Discography ==
=== Studio albums ===
- Oko (2014)

=== EPs ===
- Lena Fayre (2013)
- Is There Only One? (2015)

=== Singles ===
- "Belong to You" (2012)
- "I Am Not a Man" (2014)
- "This World" (2015)
- "Cry" (2016)

=== Music videos ===
Year	Title	Director	Ref.
2013	"Belong to You"	Leah McKissock	
2013	"Jukebox Love"	Adam Blake Carver	
2013	"Love Burning Alive"	Leah McKissock	
2014	"I Am Not a Man"	Ted Newsome	
2014	"Start a War"	Ted Newsome	
2015	"Everybody's In"	Constance Abram	
2015	"This World"	Chelsea McCarthy	
2015	"Possession"	Alan Del Rio Ortiz	
2016	"Cry"	Alan Del Rio Ortiz	

== Awards ==
Year	Competition	Category	Song/Video	Result	Ref
2013	Williamsburg International Film Festival	Music Video	"Belong to You"	Winner	
2013	Unsigned Only Music Competition	Teen	"Silver"	Runner-up	
2014	Indie Music Digest	CD of the Year 2014	Oko	Winner	
2015	American Society of Composers, Authors and Publishers	I Create Music Expo	NA	Winner	
2015	Los Angeles New Wave International Film Festival	Music Videos	"Possession"	Winner	
2015	Los Angeles Cinema Festival of Hollywood	Music Videos	"Possession"	Winner	
2015	Prestige Music Award	Music Videos	"Possession"	Gold Winner	
2015	International Songwriting Competition	Music Videos	"Possession"	Finalist	
2015	Song of the Year Contest	Songwriting	"Take the Waters"	Runner-up	
2015	The John Lennon Songwriting Contest	World	"Ophelia"	Grand Prize Winner	
2015	The Hollywood Songwriting Contest	Performance	"Do You Like That?"	Winner	
2016	John Lennon Contest, American Heart Assoc. & Women's Int. Music Network.	"LOVE" Contest	"Love Burning Alive"	Winner	
