= Sprout and the Bean =

Single by Joanna Newsom

from the album The Milk-Eyed Mender
- B-side: "What We Have Known"
- Released: November 2, 2004
- Genre: Indie folk
- Length: 4:42
- Label: Drag City
- Songwriter: Joanna Newsom
- Producer: Noah Georgeson

Joanna Newsom singles chronology
| "Sprout and the Bean" (2004) | "What We Have Known" (2011) |

Music video
- "Sprout and the Bean" on YouTube

"Sprout and the Bean" is a single by American singer-songwriter Joanna Newsom, released on Drag City on November 2, 2004. It was released as the only single from the 2004 album The Milk-Eyed Mender. It includes "What We Have Known", a re-recording of the track originally appearing on the 2003 EP Yarn and Glue, and later released as a 12-inch vinyl single in 2011.

In 2009, Pitchfork named "Sprout and the Bean" the 229th best song of the 2000s. In 2020, Paste named it the 12th best Joanna Newsom song. The song was used in the film The Strangers, a Victoria's Secret bra commercial, and a Melbourne ad campaign.

== Track listing ==
All tracks are written by Joanna Newsom.

| No. | Title | Length |
|---|---|---|
| 1. | "Sprout and the Bean" | 4:42 |
| 2. | "What We Have Known" | 6:08 |
| Total length: | | 10:50 |

The CD contains the music video for "Sprout and the Bean" which was directed by Terri Timely.

== Personnel ==
Credits adapted from liner notes.

- Joanna Newsom – vocals, harp
- Noah Georgeson – production, recording
