= Scatter (band) =

- Origin: Glasgow, Scotland
- Genres: Improvisational music, free jazz, drone, progressive folk, avant-garde jazz, folk jazz
- Labels: Pickled Egg Records; Cenotaph; Blank Tapes

Scatter are an improvisational collective, based in Glasgow.

The membership of the group is fluid. Members have included Nick McCarthy, Oliver Neilson and Hanna Tuulikki. The Blank Tapes label released their album The Mountain Announces.

== Discography ==
- Surprising Sing Stupendous Love (2004/Pickled Egg Records/Cenotaph)
- The Mountain Announces (2006/Blank Tapes)
