= Noah Georgeson =

American musician (born 1975)

- Born: Noah Andrew Georgeson; January 19, 1975 (age 51); San Anselmo, California, U.S.
- Origin: Nevada City, California, U.S.
- Instruments: Vocals, classical guitar, electric guitar, bass
- Years active: 1999–present
- Labels: Plain Recordings, Joyful Noise Records
- Education: San Francisco State University (BA); Mills College (MFA)

Noah Georgeson (born January 19, 1975), is an American musician, record producer, engineer, mixer, and solo recording artist. Georgeson's debut album Find Shelter was released through Plain Recordings on November 28, 2006.

== Early life and education ==
Noah Georgeson was born on January 19, 1975, in San Anselmo, California. He moved with his family to Nevada City, California, at the age of three. Georgeson studied classical guitar and music composition, receiving his Bachelor of Arts degree in composition from San Francisco State University in 2001, and, with a recommendation from Terry Riley, he attended Mills College, receiving his Master of Fine Arts in 2003. While at Mills, Georgeson studied with Fred Frith, Pauline Oliveros, and Alvin Curran.

== Career ==
Georgeson first found popular success as a part of San Francisco band The Pleased, along with fellow member Joanna Newsom, whose debut album The Milk-Eyed Mender he produced.

== Selected discography ==
Artist	Year	Album	Producer	Engineer	Mixer	Musician
Rodes Rollins	2018	Velvet A/B Side	check	check	check	check
Natalia Lafourcade	2017	Musas			check	
iLe	2017	‘’iLevitable’’			check	
Marlon Williams	2017	Make Way For Love	check		check	
Cate Le Bon	2016	Crab Day	check		check	
Brodka	2016	Clashes	check		check	
Lou Rhodes	2016	All the Birds			check	
Andy Shauf	2016	The Party			check	
Devendra Banhart	2016	Ape In Pink Marble	check	check	check	check
ILE	2016	iLevitable			check	
Jinnwoo	2016	You Should Be Feeling This, Elliott	check			
Chadwick Stokes	2016	The Horse Comanche	check		check	
Flo Morrissey	2016	Tomorrow Will Be Beautiful	check	check	check	check
Zavalaz	2016	All Those Nights We Never Met	check		check	
Joanna Newsom	2016	Divers	check	check	check	
Lena Fayre	2016	Is There Only One?	check	check	check	
Rodrigo Amarante	2014	Cavalo	check	check	check	
Adam Green and Binki Shapiro	2013	Adam Green and Binki Shapiro	check	check	check	check
Devendra Banhart	2013	Mala	check	check	check	check
Harper Simon	2013	Division Street			check	
My bubba	2013	Goes abroader	check		check	check
Lena Fayre	2013	Is There Only One?	check	check	check	
Lena Fayre	2013	Is There Only One?	check	check	check	
Charlotte Gainsbourg	2012	'Anna', Stage Whisper			check	
Husky	2012	Forever So			check	
Natalia Lafourcade	2012	Mujer Divina – Homenaje a Agustín Lara	check		check	
Ben Lee	2011	Deeper Into Dream"			check	
The Strokes	2011	Angles			check	
Adanowsky	2010	Amador			check	check
Adam Green	2010	Minor Love	check	check	check	check
Joanna Newsom	2010	Have One On Me		check	check	
Tamara Kaboutchek	2010	Full moon doll		check	check	check
Devendra Banhart	2009	What Will We Be				check
Megapuss	2008	Surfing'				check
Little Joy	2008	Little Joy	check	check	check	check
Os Mutantes	2007	Live at the Barbican Theatre''				check
Devendra Banhart	2007	Smokey Rolls Down Thunder Canyon	check	check	check	check
Mason Jennings	2006	Boneclouds	check	check	check	
Vetiver	2006	To Find Me Gone				check
Bert Jansch	2006	Black Swan	check	check	check	check
Noah Georgeson	2006	Find Shelter	check	check	check	check
Devendra Banhart	2005	Live at the Barbican Theatre''	check	check	check	check
Devendra Banhart	2005	Heard Somebody Say	check	check	check	check
Joanna Newsom	2004	The Milk-Eyed Mender				check
Joanna Newsom	2004	Sprout and the Bean	check	check	check	
The Pleased	2003	Don't Make Things	check			check

== Awards and nominations ==
=== Grammy Awards ===
Year	Nominee / work	Award	Result
2017	ILE - Ilevitable - Mixer	Best Latin Rock, Urban or Alternative Album	Won
2018	Natalia Lafourcade - Musas - Mixer	Best Latin Pop Album	Nominated
2019	Natalia Lafourcade - Musas, Vol. 2 - Mixer	Best Latin Pop Album	Nominated

=== Latin Grammy Awards ===
Year	Nominee / work	Award	Result
2013	Mujer Divina – Homenaje a Agustín Lara - Producer, Engineer	Best Alternative Music Album	Won
2013	Mujer Divina – Homenaje a Agustín Lara - Producer, Engineer	Latin Grammy Award for Best Engineered Album	Nominated

Year	Nominee / work	Award	Result
2017	Musas (Un Homenaje al Folclore Latinoamericano en Manos de Los Macorinos, Vol. 1) - Mixer	Album of the Year	Nominated
2017	Musas (Un Homenaje al Folclore Latinoamericano en Manos de Los Macorinos, Vol. 1) - Mixer	Best Folk Album	Won
2017	"Tú Sí Sabes Quererme" - Mixer	Song of the Year	Nominated

Year	Nominee / work	Award	Result
2018	Musas (Un Homenaje al Folclore Latinoamericano en Manos de Los Macorinos, Vol. 2) - Mixer	Album of the Year	Nominated
2018	Musas (Un Homenaje al Folclore Latinoamericano en Manos de Los Macorinos, Vol. 2) - Mixer	Best Folk Album	Won

=== Emmy Awards ===
Year	Nominee / work	Award	Result
2016	Narcos Tuyo - Producer, Mixer	Primetime Emmy Award for Outstanding Main Title Theme Music	Nominated
