= Ys (album) =

Studio album by Joanna Newsom
- Released: November 14, 2006
- Recorded: December 2005 – June 2006
- Studios: The Village Recording Studio and Entoorage Studios in Los Angeles, California
- Genres: Progressive folk; indie folk; baroque pop; avant-pop
- Length: 55:38
- Label: Drag City
- Producers: Joanna Newsom; Van Dyke Parks

Joanna Newsom chronology
The Milk-Eyed Mender (2004)	Ys (2006)	Have One on Me (2010)

Ys (/ˈiːs/ EESS) is the second studio album by the American singer-songwriter Joanna Newsom, released by Drag City on November 14, 2006. It was produced by Newsom and Van Dyke Parks, recorded by Steve Albini and mixed by Jim O'Rourke, with orchestral arrangements by Van Dyke Parks. It features guest vocals from Bill Callahan and Emily Newsom. The vocals and harp were recorded at the Village Recording Studio in Los Angeles in December 2005, with the orchestration recorded between May and June 2006 at the Entourage Studios in Los Angeles.

The album consists of five tracks with song durations ranging from 7 to 17 minutes that deal with events and people important in Newsom's life, including the sudden death of her best friend, a continuing illness and a tumultuous relationship. The album is named after the mythical Breton city of Ys.

Ys received critical acclaim, and it was Newsom's first album to chart in the Billboard 200, where it peaked at number 134. Ys also charted in the United Kingdom, France, Norway and Ireland. It has since featured on several music publications' lists of the greatest albums of all time.

== Production ==
The album features full orchestra arrangements by Van Dyke Parks on four of the five tracks. Parks also contributes accordion. Newsom's harp and vocals were recorded by Steve Albini and the orchestra was recorded by Tim Boyle. Newsom and Parks produced the album and it was mixed by Jim O'Rourke. The recording process was completely analog, on two 24-track tape recorders. The music was mixed to tape and mastered at Abbey Road Studios.

Bass guitar is contributed by Lee Sklar, and electric guitar by jazz guitarist Grant Geissman. Don Heffington played percussion and Matt Cartsonis played mandolin and banjo. Bill Callahan provides backing vocals on the song "Only Skin", while on "Emily", these are sung by Joanna's sister, Emily Newsom, after whom the song is named.

The album, particularly the length of the songs and orchestral arrangements, was partially inspired by the 1971 Roy Harper album Stormcock. In September 2007, Harper supported Joanna Newsom at her Royal Albert Hall performance, playing Stormcock in its entirety. Newsom was also impressed by Van Dyke Parks' 1967 album Song Cycle, and asked him to collaborate on Ys after listening to that record.

== Release ==
In August 2006, ahead of the album release in November, an internal server belonging to the online music publication Pitchfork was hacked; it contained promotional copies of hundreds of albums, including Ys. On tour in late 2007, Newsom performed Ys in its entirety with a 29-piece orchestra.

== Reception ==
Professional ratings
Aggregate scores
Source	Rating
Metacritic	85/100
Review scores
Source	Rating
AllMusic	5/5 stars
Entertainment Weekly	B+
The Guardian	5/5 stars
The Independent	4/5 stars
MSN Music (Consumer Guide)	C+
NME	8/10
Pitchfork	9.4/10
Rolling Stone	2/5 stars
Spin	4.5/5 stars
Uncut	5/5 stars

At Metacritic, which assigns a normalized rating out of 100 to reviews from mainstream publications, Ys received an average score of 85, indicating "universal acclaim". Chris Dahlen of Pitchfork called it "great because Newsom confronts a mountain of conflicting feelings, and sifts through them for every nuance". Describing it as "incredibly likeable, and more convivial than the twee Milk Eyed Mender", Jimmy Newlin of Slant Magazine dubbed Ys "a precious—in every sense of the word—masterpiece". Uncut's John Mulvey felt that though its "vast scale" opens up the potential for "self-indulgence" and "prog folly", upon listening to the record "all the doubts evaporate. Every elaboration has a purpose, every labyrinthine melodic detour feels necessary rather than contrived." Heather Phares of AllMusic described Ys as "a demanding listen, but it's also a rewarding and inspiring one", while Alexis Petridis of The Guardian concluded that the album is a "hard sell, perhaps, but it could be the best musical investment you make all year".

Pat Long of NME wrote that Newsom "has managed to lessen the twee factor of her last record, in the process crafting an album as bewitching as it is odd". Leah Greenblatt of Entertainment Weekly felt that Newsom "remains an acquired taste", but that Van Dyke Parks' contributions and the album's orchestration "have an ameliorating effect on the too-precious warble that either bewitches or repels." The Independent's Andy Gill wrote that Ys "leaves one in no doubt of her oddball credentials" and "rarely, if ever, has an artist so assiduously cultivated cult status". Among negative assessments, Rolling Stone critic Christian Hoard called the album "hard to stomach" and plagued by overlong tracks "with meandering strings-and-things accompaniment and indulgent vocal quirks that make Björk sound like Kelly Clarkson." Robert Christgau, in his Consumer Guide column for MSN Music, wrote that much of the "sprightly" qualities of The Milk-Eyed Mender had been "subsumed here by ambition, to be kind, and privilege, to be brutally accurate", and that the songs "reveal only that her taste for the antique is out of control".

Ys was Newsom's first album to chart in the United States, reaching number 134 on the Billboard 200. As of March 2010, Ys had sold more than 250,000 copies.

=== Legacy ===
Ys is commonly seen as Newsom's magnum opus and a musical masterpiece. Stereogum's Chris DeVille praised it for establishing Newsom as "one of the greatest creative forces of her generation." Drowned in Sound's Adam Turner-Heffer deemed it "a magical piece of work" that proclaimed US indie music as "the dominant force" for the remainder of the 2000s. Vice's Isabel Slone named Ys Newsom's "defining album", comparing it to what The Beatles' Sgt. Pepper's Lonely Hearts Club Band, Bruce Springsteen's Born in the U.S.A., and Radiohead's OK Computer were to their respective artists.

Many artists have expressed admiration for Ys and cited its influence on them and their music. Frances Quinlan, who fronts indie rock quartet Hop Along, referred to Ys as "one of the affecting albums of [their] life" and Newsom as influential to them. Strand of Oaks' Timothy Showalter expressed his admiration of the album and Newsom's lyrical gifts, writing that she "stands at some grander place than me, and I am deeply reassured by that". Other admirers include Robin Pecknold of Fleet Foxes, Emilíana Torrini, Chance the Rapper, First Aid Kit, Julianna Barwick, Yann Tiersen, La Dispute's Jordan Dreyer, Katie Gately, and Michelle Zauner of Japanese Breakfast.

== Accolades ==
By the end of 2006, Ys appeared in more than 50 year-end lists. It placed inside the top 10 in 35 of them, including a #1 ranking in Tiny Mix Tapes' Top 25 Albums of 2006, and CHARTbeat's Top 100 Albums of 2006 a #3 ranking on Pitchfork's Top 50 Albums of 2006, and a #7 ranking Time magazine's 10 Best Albums of 2006. Despite a negative review by the US Rolling Stone, the German version of the magazine named the album the second greatest of the year. The album was also included in the book 1001 Albums You Must Hear Before You Die. It was nominated for a 2007 Shortlist Music Prize.

In 2009, Ys started to appear in many "best of the decade" lists. Pitchfork named Ys the 83rd greatest album of the 2000s. Calling Newsom "unlike anyone else" aside calling the album "the most artistically ambitious indie rock enterprise of the decade". Ys is one of two Joanna Newsom albums placed inside the top 100, the other being The Milk-Eyed Mender. UK magazine Uncut placed the album inside their "150 greatest album of the decade" list, at number 21. Gigwise named Ys the 32nd greatest album of the 2000s commenting that "the record rightly received blanket acclaim upon its initial release and is already sounding better with age. Whether she'll ever top this new-folk masterpiece remains to be seen." The Times placed the album at number 26 in their top 100 albums of the decade list, while The Guardian named it one of the '1000 Albums To Hear Before You Die'. British magazine Clash placed Ys at number 13 in their '50 Greatest Albums Of Our Lifetime' list. German magazine Musikexpress named Ys the 92nd greatest album of the last four decades (1969–2009). Two Spanish magazines, Playground and Rock de Lux, have respectively named Ys their 83rd and 15th greatest album of the 2000s. About placed Ys at number one inside their greatest album of the decade list. In 2010, Tiny Mix Tapes named the album the 18th greatest of the 2000s and Cokemachineglow.com the 81st. Rhapsody named it the 46th best album of the 2000s (decade).

In 2020, Daniel Radcliffe selected the song "Emily" as one of his choices for the BBC Radio 4 program Desert Island Discs, describing Newsom as an artist "who gets weirder and more wonderful and more imaginative every time she comes back".

=== End of year ===
- #1 – Blow Up's Top Albums of 2006
- #1 – Drowned in Sound's Top Ten Albums of 2006
- #1 – emusic's Top Albums of 2006
- #1 – Sound Generator's Top Albums of 2006
- #1 – Tiny Mix Tapes's Favorite Albums of 2006
- #2 – Rockerilla's Top Albums of 2006
- #2 – Rolling Stone Germany's Top Albums of 2006
- #3 – Dagsavisen's Top Albums of 2006
- #3 – Pitchfork's Top 50 Albums of 2006
- #3 – The Wire's Records of 2006
- #4 – Dagbladet's Top Albums of 2006
- #4 – Dusted Magazine's Favorite Albums of 2006
- #4 – HARP's Top Albums of 2006
- #4 – Spex's Top Albums of 2006
- #4 – Stereogum's 2006 Gummy Awards
- #4 – Uncut's Definitive Albums of 2006
- #5 – Idolator's 2006 Jackin' Pop Critics Poll
- #6 – Spin's 40 Best Albums of 2006
- #6 – The Village Voice's 2006 Pazz & Jop Critics Poll
- #7 – Baltimore City Paper's Top Albums of 2006
- #7 – The Observer's Best Albums of 2006
- #7 – Time's 10 Best Albums of 2006
- #8 – The Austin Chronicle's 2006 in Albums
- #8 – MusicOMH's Top Albums of 2006
- #8 – PopMatters's Best Albums of 2006
- #9 – Delusions of Adequacy's Top 10 Albums of 2006
- #10 – Stylus Magazine's Top 50 Albums of 2006
- #13 – Gaffa's Top Albums of 2006
- #14 – Eye Weekly's Top Albums of 2006
- #15 – Playlouder's Top Albums of 2006
- #20 – Mojo's Top Albums of 2006
- #24 – OOR's Top Albums of 2006
- #25 – Les Inrockuptibles's Top Albums of 2006
- No Order – Allmusic's Top Albums of 2006
- No Order – BBC's Top Albums of 2006
- Nominee – Shortlist Prize's Top Albums of 2006

=== End of decade ===
- #1 – About.com's Top 100 Alternative Albums of the 2000s
- #15 – Rock de Lux's Top 100 Albums
- #18 – Tiny Mix Tapes's Favorite 100 Albums of 2000–2009
- #21 – Uncut's 150 Greatest Albums of the Decade
- #26 – The Times's 100 Best Albums of the Noughties
- #32 – Gigwise's 50 Greatest Albums of the 2000s
- #83 – Pitchfork's Top 200 Albums of the 2000s
- #83 – Playground's Top 200 Albums

=== Other ===
- #13 – Clash Magazine's 50 Greatest Albums of Our Lifetime
- #22 – The Guardian's The 100 Best Albums of the 21st Century
- #92 – Musikexpress's The 100 Best Albums 1969–2009
- #141 – NPR's 2017 List: “Turning The Tables: The 150 Greatest Albums by Women”
- No Order – Hervé Bourhis's 555 Records
- Special Mention – The Guardian's 1000 Albums to Hear Before You Die

== Track listing ==
All tracks are written by Joanna Newsom.

No.	Title	Length
1.	"Emily"	12:07
2.	"Monkey & Bear"	9:29
3.	"Sawdust & Diamonds"	9:54
4.	"Only Skin"	16:53
5.	"Cosmia"	7:15
Total length:		55:38

== Personnel ==
=== Musicians ===
- Joanna Newsom – vocals, pedal harp
- Lee Sklar – electric bass
- Grant Geissman – electric guitar
- Don Heffington – percussion
- Matt Cartsonis – banjo, mandolin
- Van Dyke Parks – accordion
- Terry Schonig – marimba, cymbalom
- Bill Callahan – vocal harmonies
- Emily Newsom – vocal harmonies

=== Production ===
- Steve Albini – engineer
- Tim Boyle – engineer
- TJ Doherty – mixing assistant
- Richard Good – design
- Joanna Newsom – producer
- Jim O'Rourke – mixing, mixing engineer
- Van Dyke Parks – producer, conductor, orchestral arrangements
- John Rosenberg – conductor
- William T. Stromberg – copy
- Wayne Kiser – [lead copyist]
- Benjamin A. Vierling – paintings
- Nick Webb – mastering

=== Orchestra ===
- Peter Kent – violin, concertmaster
- Francine Walsh – violin
- Shari Zippert – violin
- Sharon Jackson – violin
- Julie Rogers – violin
- Gina Kronstadt – violin
- John Wittenberg – violin
- Cameron Patrick – violin
- Larry Greenfield – violin
- Adriana Zoppo – violin
- Vladimir Polimatidi – violin
- Edmund Stein – violin
- David Stenske – viola
- Briana Bandy – viola
- Caroline Buckman – viola
- Jessica Van Velzen – viola
- Marda Todd – viola
- Karen Elaine – viola
- Miriam Mayer – viola
- Erika Duke-Kirkpatrick – cello
- Giovna Clayton – cello
- David Stone – bass
- Bart Samolis – bass
- Peter Doubrovsky – bass
- Peter Nevin – clarinet
- Jeff Driskill – clarinet
- Susan Greenberg – flute
- Patricia Cloud – flute
- Phillip Feather – oboe
- John Mitchell – bassoon
- Robert O'Donnell – trumpet
- Steven Durnin – French horn

== Charts ==
Chart (2006)	Peak position
Australian Albums (ARIA)	98
Belgian Albums (Ultratop Flanders)	71
French Albums (SNEP)	168
German Albums (Offizielle Top 100)	98
Irish Albums (IRMA)	50
Norwegian Albums (VG-lista)	29
UK Albums (OCC)	41
US Billboard 200 (Billboard)	134
US Heatseekers Albums (Billboard)	134
US Independent Albums (Billboard)	5
