= The Pleased =

American rock band

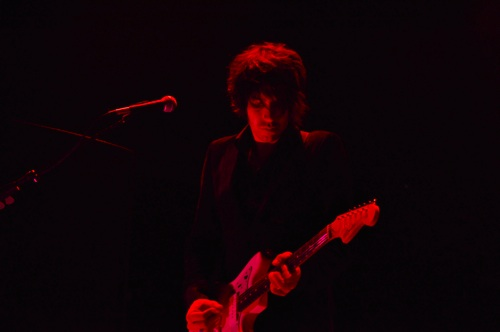
- Rich Good (co-founder of The Pleased) - Live in Concert

Background information
- Origin: San Francisco, California, U.S.
- Genres: Pop; rock
- Years active: 2002–2006
- Label: Big Wheel Recreation
- Members: Noah Georgeson; Joanna Newsom; Rich Good; Genaro Vergoglini; Luckey Remington; Jason Clark
- Website: thepleased.com

The Pleased was an American pop rock and indie rock band formed in San Francisco, California in 2002 and active in California until their disbandment in 2006.

== Description ==
The band featured prominent "freak folk" musicians and producers Joanna Newsom and Noah Georgeson. The band self-released two EPs in 2002, the debut EP Never Complete and One Piece from the Middle, and in 2003 released their debut album, Don't Make Things, through Los Angeles-based independent record label Big Wheel Recreation.

== Members ==
The band consisted of members Noah Georgeson (as lead vocalist and guitarist), Rich Good (as vocalist and guitarist), Genaro Vergoglini (as drummer), Luckey Remington (as bassist), and Joanna Newsom and Jason Clark (as keyboardists).
