= The Milk-Eyed Mender =

Studio album by Joanna Newsom
- Released: March 23, 2004
- Genres: Appalachian folk; Americana; avant-garde; folk-pop; freak folk; psychedelic folk
- Length: 52:05
- Label: Drag City
- Producer: Noah Georgeson

Joanna Newsom chronology
The Milk-Eyed Mender (2004)	Ys (2006)

Singles from The Milk-Eyed Mender
- 1. "Sprout and the Bean" Released: November 2, 2004

The Milk-Eyed Mender is the debut studio album by American singer-songwriter Joanna Newsom, released on March 23, 2004, by Drag City.

== Background ==
Newsom wrote all the songs on the album except for "Three Little Babes", a traditional Appalachian song by Texas Gladden. According to the liner notes, Newsom plays "a Lyon & Healy style 15 harp, a wurlitzer electric piano, a harpsichord, and piano."

A bandmate in San Francisco band The Pleased, Noah Georgeson, produced and recorded the album, as well as contributing guitar to two tracks and backing vocals to one. Cover art embroidery is by Emily Prince and photographs are by Alissa Anderson. Newsom thanks former touring partners Will Oldham, Devendra Banhart, and Vetiver, along with many others.

The song "Swansea" was covered by the band Bombay Bicycle Club and featured on their sophomore album Flaws in 2010. The song "The Book of Right-On" was both sampled from and reprised by Newsom on The Roots' 2010 release How I Got Over, the refrain forming the backbone of 'Right On', the album's ninth track, and covered by bluegrass musician Sarah Jarosz on her 2013's album Build Me Up from Bones.

== Critical reception ==
Professional ratings
Review scores
Source	Rating
AllMusic	4/5 stars
The Independent	4/5 stars
The Irish Times	4/5 stars
Mojo	3/5 stars
The New Zealand Herald	5/5 stars
Pitchfork	8.0/10
Stylus Magazine	C
Tiny Mix Tapes	4.5/5 stars
Uncut	4/5 stars
The Village Voice	A−

The Milk-Eyed Mender received widespread critical acclaim from contemporary music critics, earning Newsom several accolades that same year and by the end of the decade.

MacKenzie Wilson of AllMusic gave the album a favorable review, stating, "Newsom's childlike voice brings an unstudied grace to an innocent setting of songs, and such quirkiness is hard to find among most guitar-driven indie acts. Delicate harp arrangements are nicely sprinkled among specks of pianos, organs, and a harpsichord, only adding to the fascination that is Milk-Eyed Mender. Newsom exists in several musical spheres, one being a member of The Pleased, while not forgetting how wonderful it is to live in a warm place that leaves you bright-eyed and hopeful for only what is good in life."

The Sunday Times ranked it at No. 28 on its best albums of the decade list, and in 2009, Pitchfork named The Milk-Eyed Mender the 47th greatest album of the 2000s. The website also named "Peach, Plum, Pear" the 197th Greatest Song of the 2000s (decade) and "Sprout & The Bean" the 229th. Slant Magazine named the album the 83rd best album of its decade. The Milk-Eyed Mender was also ranked number 76 inside Tiny Mix Tapes's greatest records of the 2000s (decade) list.

According to The New York Times, The Milk-Eyed Mender has sold more than 200,000 copies in the U.S., despite not charting.

=== Accolades ===
End of year

- No. 1 – Dusted End of the Year: 2004
- No. 5 – The A.V. Club's Best Albums of 2004
- No. 5 – College Music Journal Top Albums of 2004
- No. 8 – Sonic's Top Albums of 2004
- No. 8 – Gaffa's Top Albums of 2004
- No. 10 – Pitchfork Media's Top 50 Albums of 2004
- No. 11 – Les Inrockuptibles's Top Albums of 2004
- No. 12 – Blitz's Top Albums of 2004
- No. 17 – Stylus Magazine's Top 40 Albums of 2004
- No. 20 – Village Voice's 2004 Pazz & Jop Critics Poll
- No. 20 – PopMatters's Top Albums of 2004
- No. 20 – Rough Trade's Top Albums of 2004
- No. 21 – No Ripcord's Top Albums of 2004
- No. 25 – BOOMKAT's Top Albums of 2004
- No. 28 – Dagsavisen's Top Albums of 2004
- No. 37 – Americana UK's Top Albums of 2004
- No. 40 – Spin's Top 40 Best Albums of the 2004
- No. 45 – Rock de Lux's Top Albums of 2004
- No. 48 – NME's Top Albums of 2004
- No Order – Rolling Stone's Top 50 Records of 2004
- No Order – Allmusic's Top Albums of 2004

End of decade

- No. 28 – The Sunday Times's Best Albums of the '00s
- No. 35 – Q's Best Albums of the '00s
- No. 47 – Pitchfork Media's Top 200 Albums of the '00s
- No. 83 – Slant Magazine's Best of the Aughts
- No. 88 – Treble's Best Albums of the '00s
- No. 162 – Under the Radar's Best Albums of the '00s

Other

- No. 54 – Porcy's Top 100 Albums of 2000–04
- No. 54 – Pitchfork Media's Top 100 Albums of 2000–04
- No. 89 – Amazon.com's Top 100 Indie Albums of All Time Amazon.com's 100 Best Indie Rock Albums of All Time.

== Track listing ==
All tracks are written by Joanna Newsom, except where noted.

No.	Title	Length
1.	"Bridges and Balloons"	3:42
2.	"Sprout and the Bean"	4:32
3.	"The Book of Right-On"	4:29
4.	"Sadie"	6:02
5.	"Inflammatory Writ"	2:50
6.	"This Side of the Blue"	5:21
7.	""En Gallop""	5:07
8.	"Cassiopeia"	3:20
9.	"Peach, Plum, Pear"	3:34
10.	"Swansea"	5:05
11.	"Three Little Babes" (traditional)	3:42
12.	"Clam, Crab, Cockle, Cowrie"	4:21
Total length:		52:05

== Personnel ==
- Joanna Newsom – vocals, harp, harpsichord, acoustic piano, wurlitzer electric piano
- Noah Georgeson – producer
- Emily Prince – artwork
- Alissa Anderson – photography
