= Joanna Newsom =

American singer-songwriter and actress (born 1982)

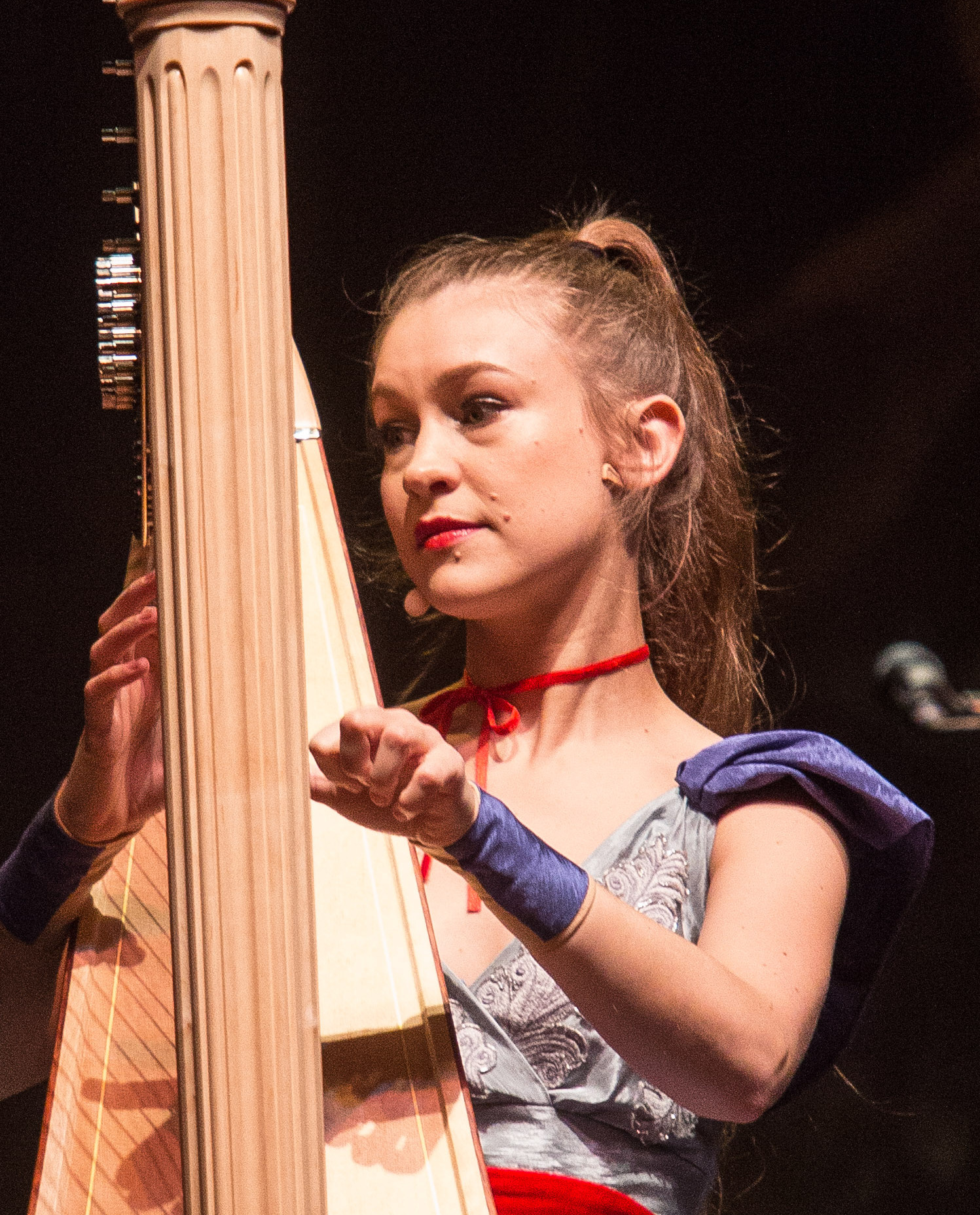
- Newsom performing in 2015
- Born: January 18, 1982 (age 44); Grass Valley, California, U.S.
- Occupations: Singer-songwriter; actress
- Years active: 2002–present
- Spouse: Andy Samberg (m. 2013)
- Children: 2
- Musical career
- Genres: Progressive folk; chamber folk; baroque pop; indie folk
- Instruments: Vocals; harp; keyboards
- Label: Drag City
- Formerly of: The Pleased; Golden Shoulders; Nervous Cop

Joanna Newsom (born January 18, 1982) is an American singer-songwriter, harpist and actress. After recording and self-releasing two EPs in 2002, Newsom signed to the independent label Drag City. Her debut album, The Milk-Eyed Mender, was released in 2004 to acclaim and garnered Newsom an underground following. She received wider exposure with Ys (2006), which reached number 134 on the Billboard 200 and was nominated for a 2007 Shortlist Music Prize. She continued releasing albums with Have One on Me in 2010 and Divers in 2015.

Newsom has been noted by critics for her unique musical style, sometimes characterized as progressive folk, and for her harp instrumentation. She has also appeared as an actress with roles in the television series Portlandia and in the 2014 film Inherent Vice.

== Early life ==
Newsom was born on January 18, 1982 in Grass Valley, California. Her parents, both doctors, were "progressive-minded professionals" who previously lived in the San Francisco Bay Area. Newsom was raised in Nevada City along with her older brother, Peter, and younger sister, Emily. She is the second cousin, twice removed, of Gavin Newsom, the fortieth Governor of California.

As a child, Newsom was not allowed to watch television or listen to the radio. She describes her parents as "kind of idealists when it came to hoping they could protect us from bad influences, like violent movies, or stupid stuff." She listened to music from a young age. Her father played the guitar, and her mother was a classically trained pianist who played the hammered dulcimer, the autoharp and conga drums. Newsom attended a Waldorf school where she studied theater and learned to memorize and recite long poems.

At five, Newsom asked her parents if she could learn to play the harp. Her parents eventually agreed to sign her up for harp lessons, but the local harp instructor did not want to take on such a young student and suggested she learn to play the piano first. She did, and later moved on to the harp which she "loved from the first lesson onward." She first played on smaller Celtic harps until her parents bought her a full-size pedal harp in the seventh grade.

After high school, she studied composition and creative writing at Mills College, where she played keyboards in The Pleased. She dropped out, however, to focus on her music and returned to live with family in Nevada City.

== Career ==
=== 2002–2005: Career beginnings and The Milk-Eyed Mender ===
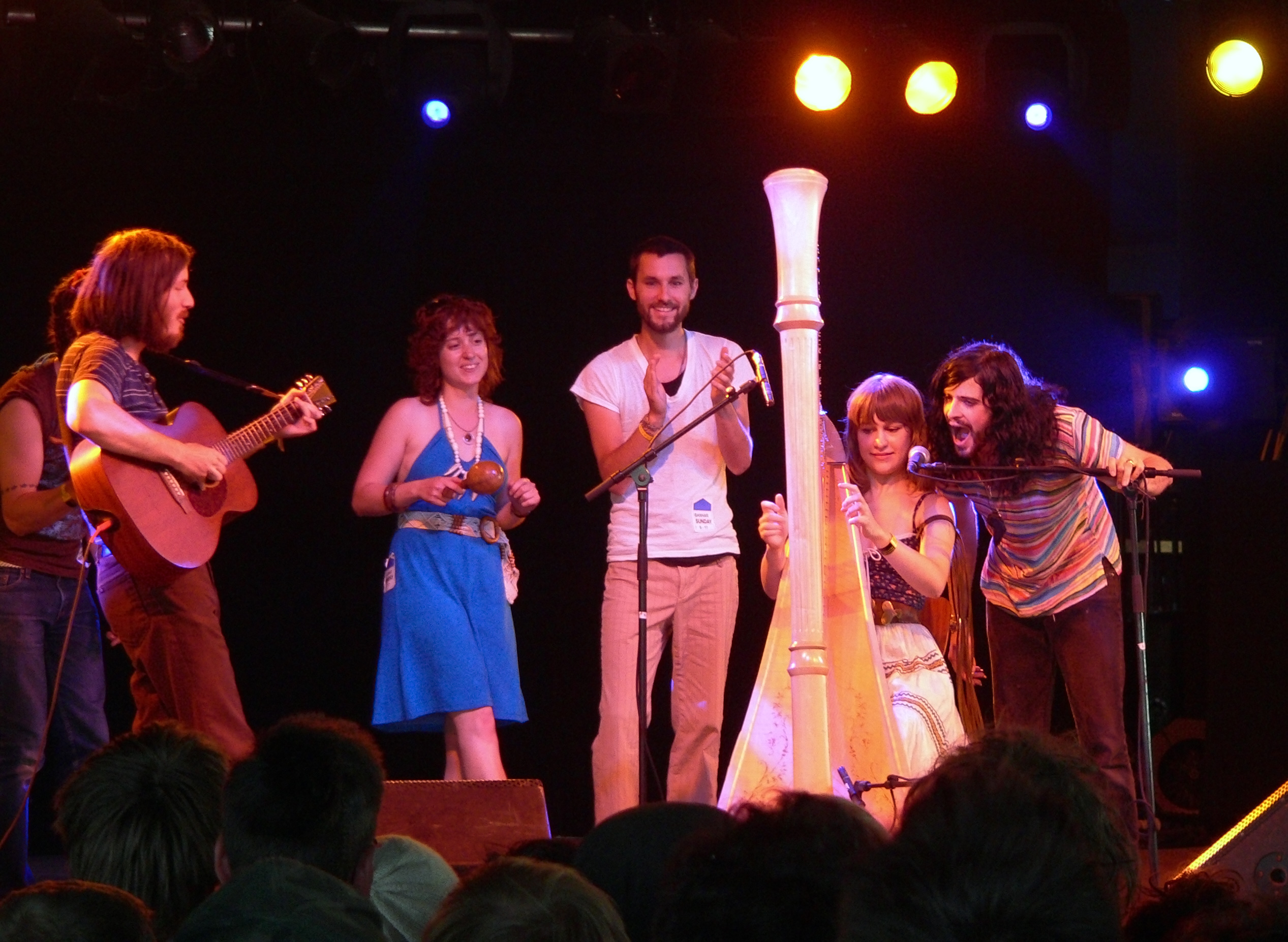
Newsom playing with Devendra Banhart and friends in 2005

In 2002–03, after appearing as a guest musician on Nervous Cop's self-titled collaboration album, Newsom recorded two EPs, Walnut Whales and Yarn and Glue. These homemade recordings were intended to serve as a document of her early work and were not intended for public distribution. At the suggestion of Noah Georgeson, her then-boyfriend and recording engineer of the EP, she burned several copies to sell at her early shows. Newsom's friend and bandmate in Golden Shoulders, Adam Kline, gave one of her CDs to Will Oldham at a show in Nevada City. Oldham was impressed with Newsom's music and asked her to tour with him. He also gave a copy of the CD to the owner of Drag City, his record label. Drag City signed Newsom and released her debut album The Milk-Eyed Mender in 2004.

Shortly thereafter, Newsom toured with Devendra Banhart and Vetiver to promote the album and made an early UK appearance at the Green Man Festival in Wales. The tour was the subject of the 2011 documentary, The Family Jams. In December 2004, she performed with Smog and Weird War at Drag City's "It's a Wonderful Next Life" Christmas party. She also appeared as a guest musician on Vetiver's 2004 self-titled album, and the following year, on Vashti Bunyan's Lookaftering (2005). The track "Sprout and the Bean" was featured in the 2008 horror film The Strangers.

The Milk-Eyed Mender had sold 200,000 copies as of 2010 and helped her garner an underground following. The album was remarked as a "neo-folk benchmark" by music historian John Morrish in 2007 and was named the 12th best folk album of all time by NME.

=== 2006–2011: Ys and Have One on Me ===
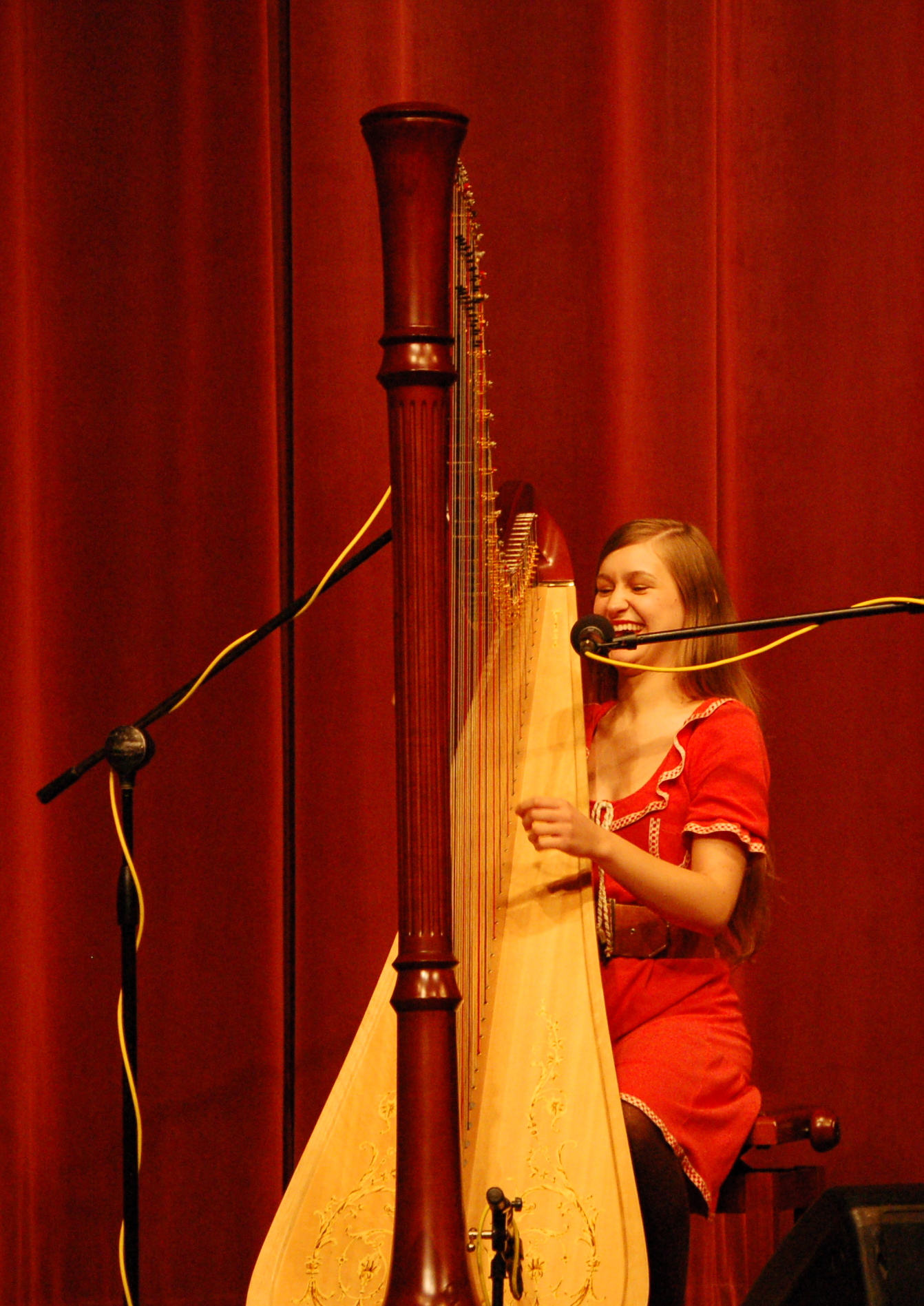
Newsom playing at Greensboro College in 2006

Her second album, Ys (/iːs/), was released in November 2006, also by Drag City. The album features orchestrations and arrangements by Van Dyke Parks, engineering from Steve Albini and mixing by Drag City label-mate Jim O'Rourke. On a road trip, Bill Callahan recommended she listen to the album Song Cycle by Parks, which led to him being chosen to arrange her work on Ys. To support Ys, Newsom performed the album live in 2008 with the Brooklyn Philharmonic in New York City and with the Sydney Symphony Orchestra in Sydney, Australia. Ys garnered Newsom wider exposure, charting at number 134 on the Billboard 200. The album was also nominated for a 2007 Shortlist Music Prize. As of 2010, Ys had sold 250,000 copies.

In 2009, she appeared in the music video for the song "Kids" by the group MGMT. Also in 2009, Newsom appeared as a guest harpist on the Moore Brothers' album Aptos and played piano on Golden Shoulders' Get Reasonable. Newsom provided additional vocals for The Lonely Island's song "Ras Trent" during this period as well. On March 28, 2009, she performed over two hours of new material at an unannounced concert in Big Sur, California, with fellow Nevada City singer-lyricist Mariee Sioux under the pseudonym the Beatles's. Those in attendance reported that about one-third of her new material was played primarily on piano, with a backing arrangement of banjo, violin, guitar and drums. On February 11, 2010, Pitchfork Media reported that Newsom would be the subject of a tribute book titled Visions of Joanna Newsom which was published by Roan Press and features a contribution from author and publisher Dave Eggers.

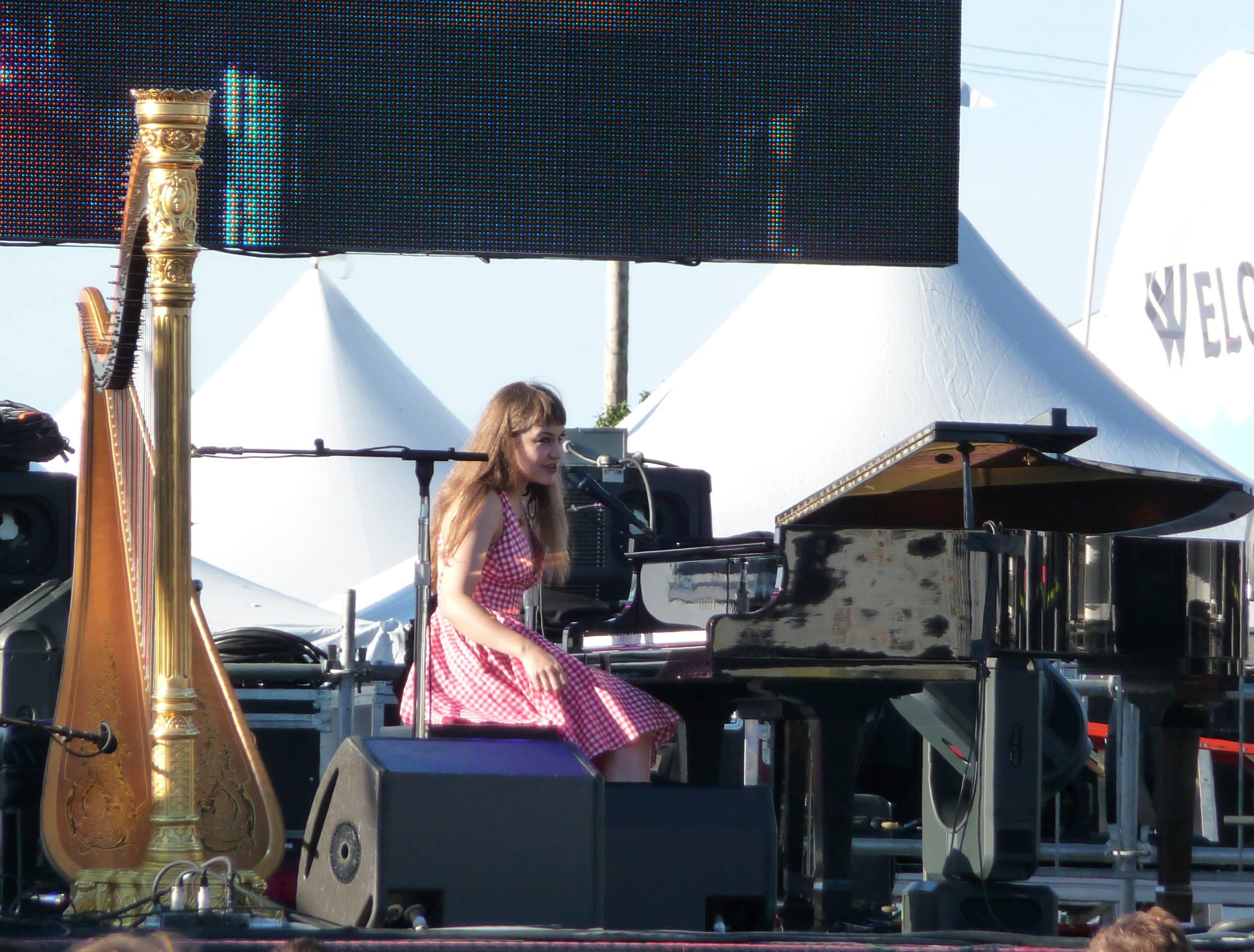
Newsom playing the Treasure Island Music Festival in 2012

Newsom's third studio album, Have One on Me, was released on February 23, 2010, in North America. A triple album recorded in Tokyo in 2009, it consists of over two hours of songs. Writing for the Los Angeles Times, Ann Powers praised the album's variety, adding: "Newsom uses the songwriter's default mode to explore how traditional love, for women, can be both the beginning and the end of possibility: a way to escape home and be exiled from it; to welcome children or be burdened by fertility; to be entrusted with secrets, or betrayed." Throughout 2010, she toured Europe and North America to promote the record, supported by a five-piece band, and also appeared as a guest composer on the album How I Got Over by the Roots, released in June of that year. She was also selected by Matt Groening to perform at the edition of the All Tomorrow's Parties festival he curated in May 2010 in Minehead, England. In December 2010, a tribute album of Newsom covers was released as a digital download. Artists involved include M. Ward, Billy Bragg, Francesco Santocono, Guy Buttery and Owen Pallett, with all proceeds going to Oxfam America's Pakistan Flood Relief Efforts.

On July 19, 2011, Newsom's second single, "What We Have Known," was released on 12" vinyl. The single was originally the b-side to her first single, "Sprout and the Bean". In June 2011, she filmed her second music video (for the song "Good Intentions Paving Company") with directors Karni & Saul. Newsom was selected by Jeff Mangum of Neutral Milk Hotel to perform at the All Tomorrow's Parties festival that he curated in March 2012 in Minehead, England. In late 2011, Newsom contributed vocals to "The Muppet Show Theme" for The Muppets and appeared on the cover of the 10th anniversary issue of Under the Radar with Robin Pecknold.

=== 2012–2018: Divers and acting ===
Newsom began 2012 with television appearances on Austin City Limits (on January 21) and Portlandia (on February 7).

On June 25, 2012, she performed at the Warfield Theatre in San Francisco with Philip Glass and Tim Fain as part of a benefit for the Henry Miller Memorial Library. She performed a new song at the concert tentatively titled The Diver's Wife, a love story concerning pearl hunting, which would eventually become the title track from her next album, Divers. On October 14, she performed another new song tentatively called "Look and Despair" at the Treasure Island Festival, which was renamed "Sapokanikan" and released as the lead single from Divers.

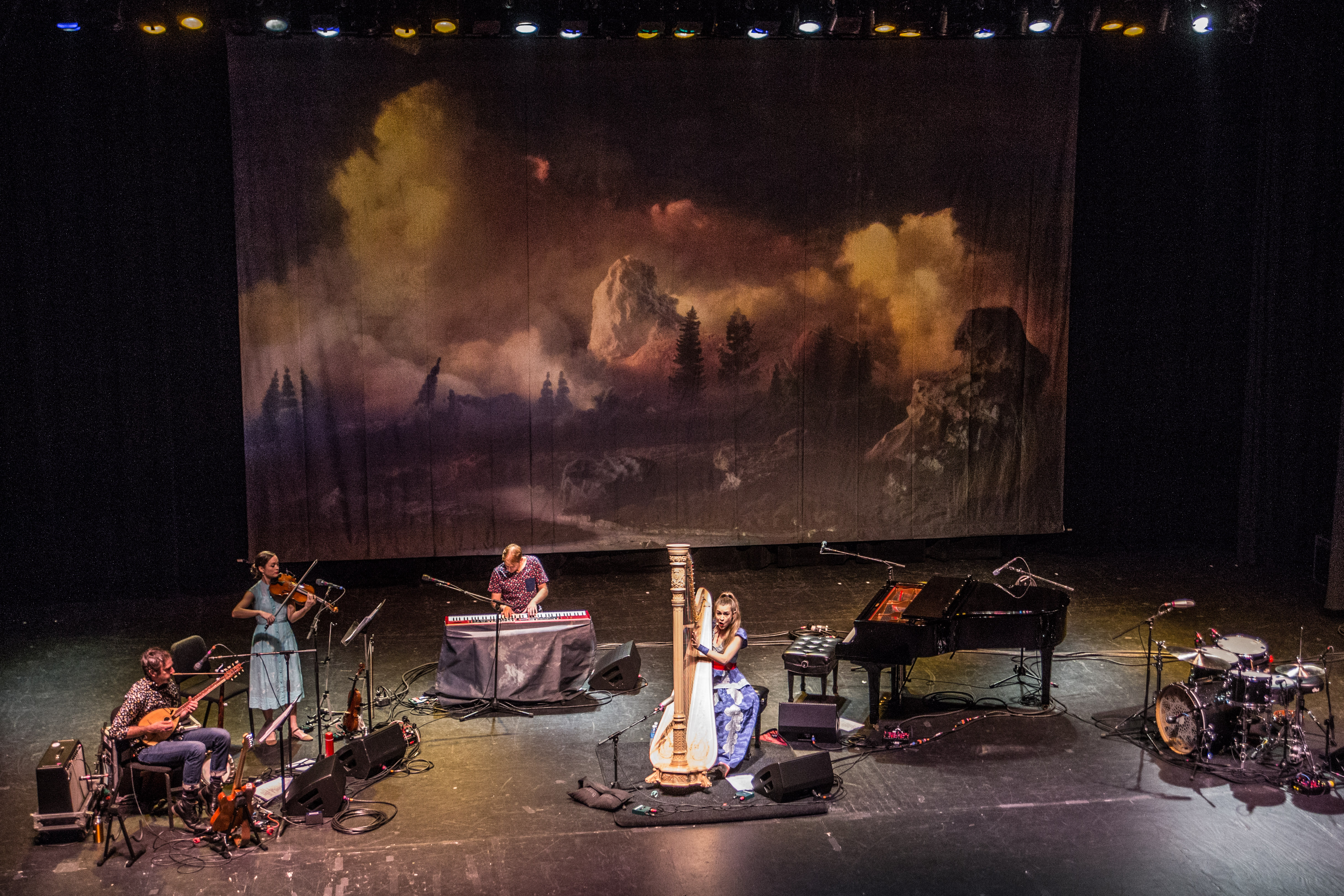
Newsom and band performing at the Orpheum Theatre, Boston, Massachusetts, 2015

Newsom appeared on a track titled "Kindness be Conceived" on Thao and the Get Down Stay Down's album We the Common, released in February 2013. In March 2013, Newsom contributed to the song "The Man Who Ran the Town" from the album Why Do Birds Suddenly Appear by British skinhead band Hard Skin.

She appeared in and narrated the 2014 film Inherent Vice, directed by Paul Thomas Anderson. Peter Travers of Rolling Stone called Newsom's narration in the film "gorgeously rendered." Newsom's fourth record, Divers, was released on October 23, 2015. The album peaked at number one on the Billboard Alternative Albums chart and topped her previous best sales week (Ys's debut).

On December 8, 2015, she performed "Leaving the City" from the album on The Late Show with Stephen Colbert. She appeared at the End of the Road Festival in 2016. In mid-July 2018, Newsom had two songs included in the NPR's "200 Greatest Songs By 21st Century Women" list, "Sapokanikan" (at number 129), and "Peach Plum Pear" (at number 80).

=== 2021–present ===
In 2021, Newsom played cellist Caroline Saint-Jacques Renard in The Last Day – Part 2 episode of Brooklyn Nine-Nine.

On March 22, 2023, she performed a surprise set as Fleet Foxes' opener during their Spring Recital show in Los Angeles, performing five new songs tentatively titled "Bombs Are Whistling," "Marie at the Mill," "Little Hand," "The Air Again," and "No Wonder." These songs remained in rotation on the setlists of a concert residency Newsom gave at Hollywood Forever Cemetery in May 2024. On May 18, 2024, during concert performances of mainly children's song covers, Newsom debuted two further original songs: "Home Economics" and "Rovenshere."

On May 27, 2026, Nevada City, California declared the day to be "Joanna Newsom Day."

== Musical style and influences ==
Newsom's musical style has been labelled as progressive folk, chamber folk, indie folk and baroque pop. Newsom's early work was strongly influenced by polyrhythms. After Ys, Newsom said she had lost interest in polyrhythms. They "stopped being fascinating to me and started feeling wanky." The press has sometimes labeled her as one of the most prominent members of the freak folk movement. Newsom, however, claims no ties to any particular music scene. Her song-writing and vocal performance style has incorporated elements of Appalachian music and its shaped-note notation. In 2006, she said her major influence was the avant-garde prog rock band Henry Cow. She has named Roy Harper's Stormcock as her favorite album, calling it "a perfect sparkling jewel of a record."

Newsom is a soprano, and has expressed disappointment at comments that her singing is "childlike," preferring to call her performance style "untrainable." Critics noticed a change in Newsom's voice on her album Have One on Me, which was the result of her developing vocal cord nodules in 2009, leading to her being unable to speak or sing for two months. The recovery from the nodules and further "vocal modifications" changed her voice.

She has cited Vladimir Nabokov and Ernest Hemingway as influences on her lyrics.

== Personal life ==
From 2004 to 2007, Newsom dated fellow musician Bill Callahan. He provided guest vocals on her song "Only Skin" from her second studio album Ys.

She met comedian Andy Samberg in 2006 at one of her concerts. They married on September 21, 2013, in Big Sur, California. In March 2014, Newsom and Samberg purchased the estate Moorcrest in Beachwood Canyon, Los Angeles, which had been owned in the 1920s by the parents of actress Mary Astor, and prior to that was rented by Charlie Chaplin. They also own a home in the West Village of Manhattan, New York City. On August 8, 2017, Samberg's representative confirmed that Newsom and Samberg had become parents to their first child, a daughter. In February 2023, Samberg's friend Jorma Taccone reported that the couple had a second child.

== Discography ==
Studio albums

- The Milk-Eyed Mender (2004)
- Ys (2006)
- Have One on Me (2010)
- Divers (2015)

== Filmography ==
Year	Title	Role	Notes	Ref.
2008	The Sky Crawlers		Voice (English version)	
2009	MGMT – Kids	Mom	Music video	
2012	Portlandia	Harpist	1 episode	
2014	Inherent Vice	Sortilège		
2016	Popstar: Never Stop Never Stopping	Steam Punk Doctor		
2021	Brooklyn Nine-Nine	Caroline Saint-Jacques Renard	Episode: “The Last Day – Part 2”	
