= Bill Callahan discography =

This is a detailed discography of American singer-songwriter Bill Callahan. All of his work was released under the alias Smog, except where noted.

== Cassettes ==
- Macramé Gunplay (1988)
- Cow (1989)
- A Table Setting (1990)
- Tired Tape Machine (1990)

== Albums ==
All released under the name "Smog" except those that mention otherwise.

Title	Release date	Label	Format	Additional info
Sewn to the Sky	1990	Disaster	LP	Re-released by Drag City on CD in 1995, on LP in 1996 and on CD in 2005
Forgotten Foundation	May 25, 1992	Drag City	CD	Re-released on LP in 1996, and on CD in 2005
Julius Caesar	July 5, 1993	Drag City	LP/CS/CD	Re-released on CD by Domino Records in 2001
Wild Love	March 27, 1995	Drag City	LP/CD	Re-released on CD by Domino Records in 2001
The Doctor Came at Dawn	September 10, 1996	Drag City / Domino	LP/CD	
Red Apple Falls	May 20, 1997	Drag City / Domino	LP/CD	
Knock Knock	January 12, 1999	Drag City / Domino	LP/CD	
Dongs of Sevotion	April 4, 2000	Drag City / Domino	2×LP/CD	
Rain on Lens	September 18, 2001	Drag City / Domino	LP/CD	
Supper	March 18, 2003	Drag City / Domino	LP/CD	
A River Ain't Too Much to Love	May 31, 2005	Drag City / Domino	LP/CD	Latest album released under the name Smog
Woke on a Whaleheart	April 17, 2007	Drag City	LP/CD	First album released as Bill Callahan
Sometimes I Wish We Were an Eagle	April 14, 2009	Drag City	LP/CD	As Bill Callahan
Apocalypse	April 11, 2011	Drag City	LP/CD	As Bill Callahan UK chart peak: #116
Dream River	September 17, 2013	Drag City	LP/CD	As Bill Callahan UK chart peak: #44
Have Fun with God	January 21, 2014	Drag City	LP/CD	As Bill Callahan
Shepherd in a Sheepskin Vest	June 14, 2019	Drag City	LP/CD	As Bill Callahan UK chart peak: #37
Gold Record	September 4, 2020	Drag City	LP/CD	As Bill Callahan UK chart peak: #94
Ytilaer	October 14, 2022	Drag City	LP/CD	As Bill Callahan
My Days of 58	February 27, 2026	Drag City	LP/CD	As Bill Callahan

== Compilations ==
- Accumulation: None (released under the alias (Smog) on November 5, 2002, by Drag City / Domino)
- Blind Date Party (collaborative double album with Bonnie "Prince" Billy released on December 10, 2021)

== EPs ==
Title	Release date	Label	Format	Additional info
Floating	August 23, 1991	Drag City	7-inch	
Burning Kingdom	September 19, 1994	Drag City	12-inch/CS/CD	Rerelased on CD by Domino Records in 2001.
Kicking a Couple Around	April 29, 1996	Drag City / Domino Records	12-inch/CD	
The Manta Rays of Time	2000	Spunk Records	CD	
Strayed	July 17, 2000	Drag City / Domino Records	CD	Features a reissue of the rare self-released cassette Cow.
'Neath the Puke Tree	December 11, 2000	Drag City / Domino Records	12-inch/CD	

== Live recording ==
- Rough Travel for a Rare Thing (2010)
- Bill Callahan Live at Third Man Records (2018)
- Resuscitate! (2024)

== Singles ==
Title	Year	Format	Label	Additional info
"My Shell" / "Astronaut"	1991	7-inch (split with Suckdog)	#1 Hits!	An electric version of "My Shell" was later featured on the Burning Kingdom EP.
"A Hit"	1994	7-inch	Drag City	
"Came Blue" / "Spanish Moss"	1996	7-inch	Hausmusik	
"Ex-Con"	1997	7-inch/CD	Domino Records	From Red Apple Falls.
"Held"	1998	7-inch/CD	Drag City / Domino Records	From Knock Knock.
"Look Now"	1999	7-inch/CD	Drag City	From Knock Knock.
"Cold Blooded Old Times"	1999	7-inch/CD	Domino Records	From Knock Knock.
"Strayed"	2000	7-inch	Drag City / Domino Records	From Dongs of Sevotion.
"Rock Bottom Riser"	2006	CD	Drag City / Domino Records	From A River Ain't Too Much to Love.
"Diamond Dancer"	2007	CD	Drag City	From Woke on a Whaleheart.
"Wind and the Dove" (live)	2010	7-inch	Drag City	
"Blackness of the Night"	2020	digital	Drag City	Cover with Will Oldham, featuring AZITA, later compiled on Blind Date Party
"OD'd in Denver"	2020	digital	Drag City	Cover with Will Oldham, featuring Matt Sweeney, later compiled on Blind Date Party
"I've Made Up My Mind"	2020	digital	Drag City	Cover with Will Oldham, featuring Alasdair Roberts, later compiled on Blind Date Party
"Red Tailed Hawk"	2020	digital	Drag City	Cover with Will Oldham, featuring Matt Kinsey, later compiled on Blind Date Party
"Wish You Were Gay"	2020	digital	Drag City	Cover with Will Oldham, featuring Sean O'Hagan, later compiled on Blind Date Party
"Deacon Blues"	2020	digital	Drag City	Cover with Will Oldham, featuring Bill MacKay, later compiled on Blind Date Party
"Our Anniversary"	2020	digital	Drag City	Smog cover with Will Oldham, featuring Dead Rider, later compiled on Blind Date Party
"I Love You"	2020	digital	Drag City	Cover with Will Oldham, featuring David Pajo, later compiled on Blind Date Party
"Sea Song"	2020	digital	Drag City	Cover with Will Oldham, featuring Mick Turner, later compiled on Blind Date Party
"I've Been the One"	2020	digital	Drag City	Cover with Will Oldham, featuring Meg Baird, later compiled on Blind Date Party
"Letter Sung to Friends"/"Little Bird"	2020	digital	Drag City	Covers with Will Oldham, featuring Nathan Salsburg
"Rooftop Garden"	2021	digital	Drag City	Cover with Will Oldham, featuring George Xylouris, later compiled on Blind Date Party
"Miracles"	2021	digital	Drag City	Cover with Will Oldham, featuring Ty Segall, later compiled on Blind Date Party
"Lost in Love"	2021	digital	Drag City	Cover with Will Oldham, featuring Emmett Kelly, later compiled on Blind Date Party
"Night Rider's Lament"	2021	digital	Drag City	Cover with Will Oldham, featuring Cory Hanson, later compiled on Blind Date Party
"Arise Therefore"	2021	digital	Drag City	Will Oldham cover with Oldham, featuring Six Organs of Admittance, later compiled on Blind Date Party
"The Night of Santiago"	2021	digital	Drag City	Cover with Will Oldham, featuring David Grubbs, later compiled on Blind Date Party
"The Wild Kindness"	2021	digital	Drag City	Cover with Will Oldham, featuring Cooper Crain, later compiled on Blind Date Party
"I Want to Go to the Beach"	2021	digital	Drag City	Cover with Will Oldham, featuring Cassie Berman, later compiled on Blind Date Party
"She Is My Everything"	2021	digital	Drag City	Cover with Will Oldham, featuring Richard Bishop, later compiled on Blind Date Party
"Kidnapped by Neptune"	2021	digital	Drag City	Cover with Will Oldham, featuring Hamerkop

== Other appearances ==
=== Studio appearances ===
Year	Song(s)	Album	Album artist
1994	"Your Face"	Hey Drag City (Drag City Compilation (DC20))	Various artists (as Smog)
1999	"Extra Blues" (might be produced/feature string arrangements by Walker(?))	Pola X (Original Soundtrack)	Soundtrack composed by Scott Walker also featuring contributions from Smog & Sonic Youth among others
2009	"The Breeze/My Baby Cries"	Loving Takes This Course: A Tribute to the Songs of Kath Bloom	Various artists (covering Kath Bloom)
2009	"Santa Maria" originally by Versus	Score! 20 Years of Merge Records: The Covers!	Various artists
2009	"For a Rainbow"	Crayon Angel: A Tribute to the Music of Judee Sill	Various artists (covering Judee Sill)
2010	"Lapse"	Stroke: Songs for Chris Knox	Various artists (covering Chris Knox)

=== Guest appearances ===
Year	Album artist	Album	Song(s)
2006	Joanna Newsom	Ys	"Only Skin"

== Collaborations ==
Year	Band	Title	Label	Additional info
1993	The Sundowners	Goat Songs 7-inch EP	Sea Note Records	Collaboration with Will Oldham. Reissued on May 21, 1994.
c.1993	The Sundowners	"The Girl with the Thing in Her Hair" / "The Summer Song" 7-inch	Sea Note Records	Collaboration with Will Oldham.
2001	Drag City Supersessions	Tramps, Traitors and Little Devils	Drag City	Collaboration with Edith Frost and Neil Michael Hagerty
