= Accumulation: None =

Compilation album by (Smog)
- Released: November 5, 2002
- Recorded: 1989–2002
- Genre: Lo-fi
- Length: 41:58
- Label: Drag City
- Producer: Bill Callahan

(Smog) chronology
Rain on Lens (2001)	Accumulation: None (2002)	Supper (2003)

Professional ratings
Review scores
Source	Rating
AllMusic	4/5 stars
Pitchfork	7.7/10

Accumulation: None is a compilation of rarities by the American singer-songwriter Bill Callahan, released under his then alias, Smog. It was put out on November 4, 2002, in Europe by Domino Records and a day later in North America by Drag City. The compilation includes the then-new song "White Ribbon."

== Track listing ==
1. "Astronaut" – 1:35
  - From "My Shell" split single with Suckdog
2. "A Hit" – 3:07
  - From "A Hit" single on Drag City
3. "Spanish Moss" – 2:12
  - B-side of the Hausmusik 7" single "Came Blue"
4. "Chosen One" (John Peel Session) – 4:36
  - B-Side of the "Cold Blooded Old Times" single
5. "Floating" – 1:15
  - From the Floating EP on Drag City
6. "Real Live Dress" – 5:24
  - From the Australian-only EP The Manta Rays of Time
7. "Came Blue" – 3:38
  - A-side of the Hausmusik 7" single
8. "Little Girl Shoes" – 5:18
  - B-side of the "Ex-Con" 7" single
9. "Cold Blooded Old Times" (Acoustic) – 3:45
  - B-Side of the "Cold Blooded Old Times" single
10. "White Ribbon" – 4:04
  - New song
11. "I Break Horses" (John Peel Session) – 6:14
  - B-side of the "Cold Blooded Old Times" single
12. "Hole in the Heart" – 0:44
  - From the Floating EP
