= Drugs Are Nice =

2005 book by Lisa Crystal Carver

Drugs Are Nice: A Post-Punk Memoir
- Author: Lisa Crystal Carver
- Language: English
- Genre: Memoir
- Publisher: Soft Skull Press
- Publication date: 2005
- Publication place: United States

Drugs Are Nice: A Post-Punk Memoir is the memoir of punk musician and performance artist Lisa Crystal Carver, published by Soft Skull Press in the US in 2005 and by Snowbooks in the UK in 2006.

The book covers her life from ages 18 to 32. It relates her childhood growing up with her volatile ex-convict father, and her running away at 19 to enter into a troubled marriage to French performance artist Costes. The book also details her relationships with Smog's Bill Callahan and with industrial-music provocateur Boyd Rice, with whom she had her son Wolfgang.

== Background ==
Drugs are Nice is adapted in part from Carver's diaries. She workshopped the book at a critique group she called the "Meat and Books Club" (named for the Atkins diet two of its writers were on). The chapters about her relationship with Rice, where Carver writes that Rice insisted she get an abortion to end her second pregnancy and was violent toward her, were difficult for her to write. She told the Boston Phoenix that she "had to get drunk every day" to write them. In lieu of a traditional book tour, Carver re-enacted a few anecdotes from the book live, including a suicide attempt with a potato peeler and a quick "make-out session" with GG Allin.

The book was released alongside an hour-long DVD, Drugs Are Nice: A Suckumentary 1988-2005. It contained film shorts, footage of her band Suckdog, and avant-garde operas that she and Costes had put on.

== Critical reception ==
The Village Voice, reviewing the memoir, called it "an amazing elegy for the lost underground of the '80s." It was also praised by Billboard, Kirkus Reviews and Publishers Weekly.
