= 'Neath the Puke Tree =

EP by Smog
- Released: December 11, 2000
- Length: 20:25
- Labels: Drag City; Domino

Smog chronology
Strayed (2000)	'Neath the Puke Tree (2000)	Rain on Lens (2001)

Professional ratings
Review scores
Source	Rating
AllMusic	3/5 stars
Pitchfork	6.8/10

'Neath the Puke Tree is an EP by Bill Callahan (also known as Smog). It was released on Drag City in 2000.

Recorded by Brent "Sloth" Puncheon and Leah Baker, it includes remakes of previous work ("I Was a Stranger" from Red Apple Falls and "A Jar of Sand" from Sewn to the Sky) as well as three new songs.

Charlie Gansa played guitar on the record; "Sloth" and Jim White played drums. White would return to play drums on Supper and A River Ain't Too Much to Love.

== Track listing ==
No.	Title	Length
1.	"I Was a Stranger"	3:31
2.	"Your Sweet Entrance"	4:41
3.	"A Jar of Sand"	3:41
4.	"Orion Obscured by Stars"	5:16
5.	"Coacheecayoo"	3:12
