= Dame Darcy =

American cartoonist (born 1971)

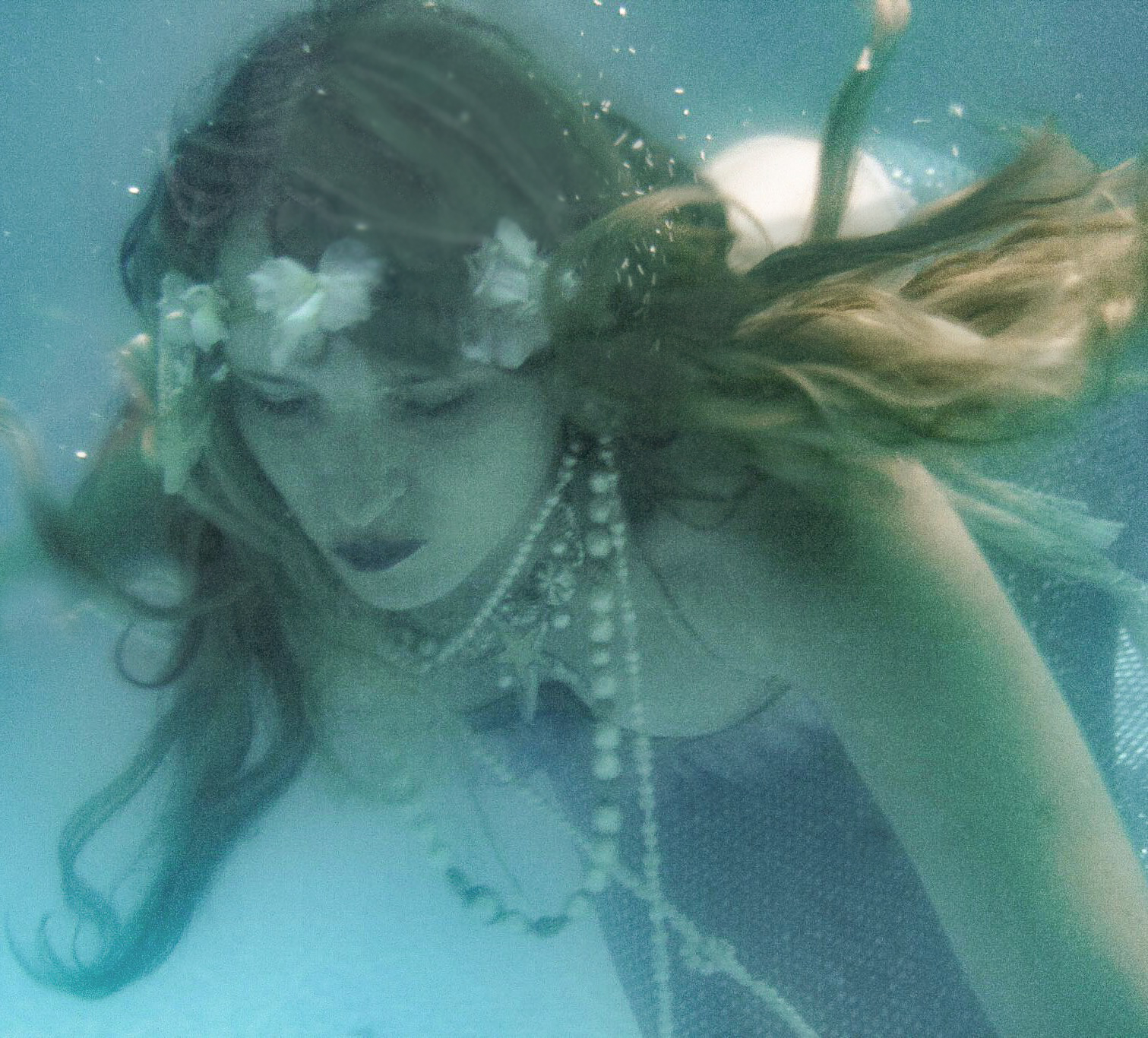
- Dame Darcy swimming as a mermaid
- Born: June 19, 1971 (age 55) Caldwell, Idaho, U.S.
- Areas: Cartoonist, designer of Dame Darcy Mermaid Tarot and Queen Alice Tarot decks, fine artist, musician, performer, animator, filmmaker
- Pseudonym: Dame Darcy Pleasant
- Notable works: Meat Cake

Dame Darcy Pleasant (born June 19, 1971), better known by the pen name Dame Darcy, is an American alternative cartoonist, fine artist, musician, cabaret performer, and animator/filmmaker. Her "Neo-Victorian" comic book series Meat Cake was published by Fantagraphics Books from 1993 to 2008. The Meat Cake Bible compilation was released in June 2016 and nominated for an Eisner Award in July 2017. Vegan Love: Dating and Partnering for the Cruelty-Free Gal, with Fashion, Makeup & Wedding Tips, written by Maya Gottfried and illustrated by Dame Darcy, was the Silver Medalist winners of the Independent Publisher Book Awards in 2018.

== Biography ==
Dame Darcy acquired her initial skill set while still a child and teen working as an apprentice to her father in his sign-painting studio, Green Tree Graphics. She began her own career at age 17 when she won a scholarship to the San Francisco Art Institute. During this time, she acted in films by George Kuchar.

She made her first publishing deal at the age of 21 when her comic book series Meat Cake was picked up by Fantagraphics Books. She originally considered using the pen name "Richard Dirt" but her father suggested adding a title to her own first name instead, so Darcy used the name Richard Dirt as a character in her comic book.

She worked with writer Alan Moore and for such publishers as America's Best Comics, DC Comics, Image Comics, Kitchen Sink Press, Starhead Comix, Penguin Putnam, PressPop Tokyo, Merrell, Henry Holt and Company, and Seven Stories Press. Dame Darcy published over 100 books internationally, with her comics being translated into Japanese, French, Spanish, and Portuguese, among others. Her films and animation won awards and have been shown internationally. Her fine art and dolls were exhibited and sold in art galleries globally for more than 20 years.

In the 1990s, Dame Darcy made a doll for Courtney Love which included hair from the late Kurt Cobain. The doll was a gift to Love's daughter Frances Bean Cobain. Dame Darcy planned to auction some of Kurt Cobain's leftover hair in 2015 but withdrew it following a complaint from Love.

In the late 1990s director Lisa Hammer and Dame Darcy produced a variety TV show titled Turn Of The Century profiling their short "silent film" style movies for Manhattan public access, which is now part of the Getty Museum Collection. Turn Of The Century is currently streaming on Night Flight Plus as of 2024. Due to the popularity of this TV show on Night Flight, and with the support of the "Girls to the Front - Nineties and Now" Exhibition, The Elaborate Empire of Ache, an experimental surrealist short film directed by Lisa Hammer and starring Dame Darcy was shown in the Museum of Modern Art.

She performed for a time with Lisa Crystal Carver and Jean-Louis Costes's underground cabaret Suckdog Circus. A documentary concert film starring Lisa Carver (Lisa Suckdog) as "The Dish" and Dame Darcy as "Ghost Mother" called SUCKDOG Reunion Tour 2016 was produced in 2016.

Dame Darcy's autobiographical graphic novel, Hi Jax & Hi Jinx (Life's a Pitch and Then You Live Forever), was published by Feral House in 2019 Other graphic novels include Handbook for Hot Witches, The Illustrated Jane Eyre, Frightful Fairytales, Gasoline, and Dollerium. Her self-published Mermaid Tarot and Queen Alice tarot card decks are independently distributed.

She has illustrated for fashion designers Anna Sui and Gothic Lolita designers CWC, Baby Doll, Ku, Coi Girl Magic and Jared Gold while working as a runway model in NYC and LA.

Her teaching experience varies among all ages and contexts. Dame Darcy taught an independent comics publishing course at the School of Visual Arts in Manhattan, as well as lecturing and workshops at Columbia University, and in Europe and Japan.

Dame Darcy is married to J. Pleasant as of 2023.
