= Christian Ludwig Mayer =

German pianist and composer (born 1974)

- Also known as: Ludwig Auwald
- Born: 1974 (age 51–52)
- Origin: Germany
- Genres: Classical; jazz
- Occupations: Pianist, composer

Christian Ludwig Mayer (born March 21, 1974) is a German pianist and composer. He also appears under the pseudonym of Ludwig Auwald.

Mayer began as an autodidact and studied jazz piano and classical piano with Leonid Chizhik at Richard-Strauss-Konservatorium München, as well as harpsichord and jazz composition. He has worked with Gunther Klatt, Giora Feidman, Marcus Woelfle, and New Orleans–based trombonist Dwayne Paulin. He also works frequently with Montauk based violinist Bob Stern.

== Partial discography ==
- 1997 Black & White, Dwayne Paulin Quartet, Bauer Studios Ludwigburg-CHAOS
- 2004 Cabaret Modern, AudioFilm with Noël Akchoté, Red, Giovanna Cacciola, John Greaves, Jean-Louis Costes, etc., Winter & Winter
- 2009 Dedications, MAQ, Michael Ausserbauer Quartett
- 2010 Robert Schumann – Von Wilden Reitern und Träumereien, classical music history for children, based on Robert Schumann IGEL-Records, BR-Klassik
