= Lisa Crystal Carver =

American writer, journalist, and former musician

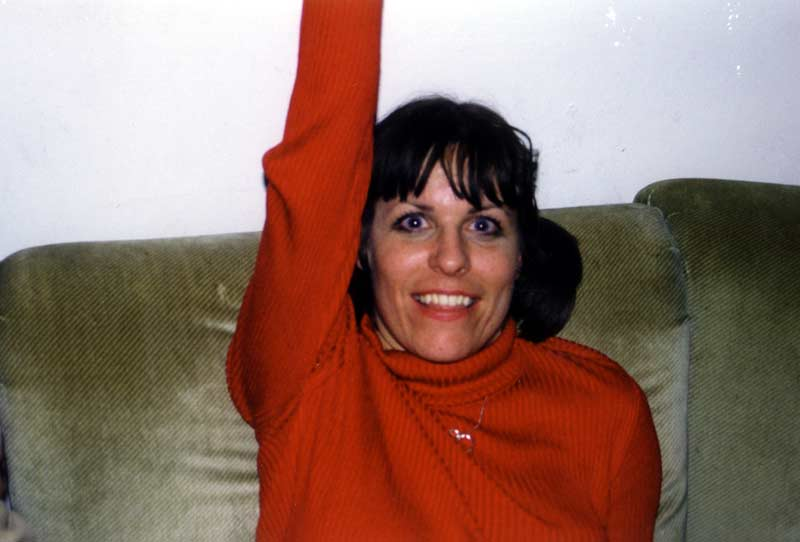
- Carver in 1999
- Born: November 9, 1968 (age 58); Dover, New Hampshire, U.S.
- Occupations: Writer, performance artist, musician
- Spouses: Jean-Louis Costes; Dave Goolkasian; Bruno
- Children: 1
- Writing career
- Notable works: Rollerderby; Drugs Are Nice

Lisa Crystal Carver (born November 9, 1968, Dover, New Hampshire), also known as Lisa Suckdog, is an American writer known for her writing in Rollerderby. Through her interviews, she introduced the work of Vaginal Davis, Dame Darcy, Cindy Dall, Boyd Rice, Costes (her ex-husband with whom she performed as Suckdog), Nick Zedd, GG Allin, and Liz Armstrong to the public. A collection of notable articles from the zine was published as Rollerderby: The Book.

She started touring with the performance art band Psycodrama when she was 18 years old. It was also at this time that she began doing sex work, which has been a major theme in her writings over the years. She began touring with Costes a year later, and would also tour without him when he was in France. She toured the U.S. and Europe six times, the last time in 1998. The noise music soap operas included audience interaction including dancing and mock-rape of audience members.

Carver is also the author of Dancing Queen: a Lusty Look at the American Dream, in which she expounds upon various relics of pop culture past, including Lawrence Welk, roller rinks, and Olivia Newton-John. In 2005, Soft Skull Press released Drugs Are Nice, detailing her early childhood and later romantic relationships with Costes, Boyd Rice (with whom she has a son) and Smog's Bill Callahan. In addition to writing her own zines and books, Carver has also written for various magazines (including Peter Bagge's comic book Hate) and kept a fictionalized journal about her sex life for the website Nerve. Although Carver no longer writes her journal for the site, she is still a semi-regular contributor. The online journal at Nerve was subsequently published in book form as The Lisa Diaries: Four Years in the Sex Life of Lisa Carver and Company.

2012 saw the release of Carver's treatise on the artistic career of Yoko Ono titled Reaching Out with No Hands: Reconsidering Yoko Ono (Backbeat Books). As of 2015, Carver has written a handful of pieces for website The Recoup. Her book, The Jaywalker, is a short story collection illustrated by long-time friend and collaborator Dame Darcy. Lisa, Dame Darcy, Maddie Kuzak, and Genevieve Kuzak toured parts of the world in 2016 to promote the book—a performance art show reminiscent of the early 1990s Suckdog.

She also interviewed mixed martial arts fighter Brent Bergeron for an article that appeared in Vice magazine.

In 2017, Carver released Suckdog: A Ruckus (self published). This book, including 80+ photos and illustrations, looks back at Carver's wild past onstage and behind-the-scenes.

In 2023, she published an essay in The Paris Review contrasting French and American culture and discussing her relationship with her husband Bruno.

In her personal life, she has "been married four times and divorced three", and lived in Montmorency, France, from 2021 until 2025.

Carver currently lives in Pittsburgh, Pennsylvania.

== Bibliography ==
- Carver, Lisa Crystal (1996). Rollerderby: The Book. Feral House. ISBN 9780922915385.
- Carver, Lisa Crystal (1996). Dancing Queen: a Lusty Look at the American Dream. Owlet. ISBN 9780805043921.
- Carver, Lisa Crystal (2002). The Lisa Diaries: Four Years in the Sex Life of Lisa Carver and Company. Black Books. ISBN 9781892723161.
- Carver, Lisa Crystal (2005). Drugs Are Nice: A Post-Punk Memoir. Soft Skull Press. ISBN 9781932360943.
- Carver, Lisa Crystal (2011). "no title". Self-Published. ISBN 9780578095493.
- Carver, Lisa Crystal (2012). Reaching Out with No Hands: Reconsidering Yoko Ono. Backbeat Books. ISBN 9781617130946.
- Carver, Lisa Crystal (2014). Money's Nothing. Lucky. ISBN 9780578139616.
- Carver, Lisa Crystal (2015). How To Not Write. Self-Published. ISBN 9780578152370.
- Carver, Lisa Crystal (2015). 25 Lives. Self-Published. ISBN 9780578166087.
- Carver, Lisa Crystal (2015). Sadie, Wolf, and Friends. Self-Published. ISBN 9780578170886.
- Carver, Lisa Crystal (2016). The Jaywalker. Self-Published. ISBN 9780578177311.
- Carver, Lisa Crystal (2017). Suckdog: A Ruckus. Self-Published. ISBN 9780578187334.
- Carver, Lisa Crystal (2019). I Love Art. TigerBee Press. ISBN 9780997044485.
- Carver, Lisa Crystal (2021). The Pahrump Report. Pig Roast Publishing. ISBN 9780999407356.
- Carver, Lisa Crystal (2023). No Land's Man. Pig Roast Publishing. ISBN 9780999407363.
- Carver, Lisa Crystal (2025). Lover of Leaving. Pig Roast Publishing. ISBN 979-8989147083.
