= Cornhole (disambiguation) =

Cornhole is a lawn game.

Cornhole or Corn Hole may also refer to:

- Corn Hole, a named spring at Hot Springs National Park
- "Corn Holes", a 2004 song by the Focus Group, from the album Sketches and Spells
- Cornhole (slang), a vulgarism for anus or anal sex

== See also ==
- "Cornholers & Confederates", a 2000 comedy track by Jackie Martling from F Jackie
- Cornholio, an alter-ego of Beavis from the cartoon Beavis and Butt-Head
