= Woke on a Whaleheart =

Studio album by Bill Callahan
- Released: April 24, 2007
- Recorded: November 2006
- Genre: Lo-fi
- Length: 40:29
- Label: Drag City
- Producers: Bill Callahan, Neil Michael Hagerty

Bill Callahan chronology
A River Ain't Too Much to Love (2005)	Woke on a Whaleheart (2007)	Sometimes I Wish We Were an Eagle (2009)

Singles from Woke on a Whaleheart
- 1. "Diamond Dancer" Released: 2007

Professional ratings
Aggregate scores
Source	Rating
Metacritic	76/100
Review scores
Source	Rating
AllMusic	3.5/5 stars
Pitchfork	6.9/10
Spin	2.5/5 stars
Uncut	4/5 stars

Woke on a Whaleheart is the first record released by Bill Callahan under his own name instead of his nom de plume Smog. It was released by Drag City on April 24, 2007, and released a week earlier in Callahan's home state of Texas. A single, "Diamond Dancer," preceded the release of the album on March 20, 2007.

Callahan has explained the name change, stating: "I realized that [Smog is] a really ugly word. I realized I'd been going so many years without even thinking about it. I realized I didn't want to be associated with this thing that doesn't even exist. Because a name is a pretty strong thing, right?". He initially planned to release the previous Smog album, A River Ain't Too Much to Love, under his own name but decided against doing so after pressure from Drag City.

The arrangements of labelmate and former Royal Trux vocalist and guitarist Neil Michael Hagerty are featured on the album, and Callahan's band consists of vocalist Deani Pugh-Flemmings, guitarist Pete Denton, violinist Elizabeth Warren, percussionist Thor Harris, bassist Steve Bernal, and keyboard/lap steel player Howard Draper. The album was recorded by Jeremy Lemos, who previously recorded the Smog albums Rain on Lens and Supper. Woke on a Whaleheart's sound, according to Callahan, touches upon "gospel, tough pop and American Light Opera."

Joe Grillo of the art collective Dearraindrop created the album artwork.

== Track listing ==
All tracks are written by Bill Callahan.

No.	Title	Length
1.	"From the Rivers to the Ocean"	6:35
2.	"Footprints"	2:47
3.	"Diamond Dancer"	4:00
4.	"Sycamore"	5:35
5.	"The Wheel"	4:03
6.	"Honeymoon Child"	4:40
7.	"Day"	4:32
8.	"Night"	3:04
9.	"A Man Needs a Woman or a Man to Be a Man"	5:13
