= Johnnie Frierson =

American gospel singer

The cover of Frierson's Have You Been Good to Yourself

Johnnie Frierson (June 25, 1945 – April 20, 2010) was an American soul and gospel singer and songwriter from Memphis, Tennessee. After a short-lived musical career with Stax Records, he served in the U.S. Army and worked as a mechanic, carpenter, and teacher. In the 1990s, he produced homemade cassette recordings of gospel-inspired songs, which were posthumously reissued as Have You Been Good to Yourself in 2016.

== Early life ==
Johnnie Frierson was born in Memphis, Tennessee, in 1945.

He learned to play guitar early on and began singing in church at the Church of God in Christ and performing with touring gospel groups on weekends, including the O.V. Wright-led Sunset Travelers. His first recording was as the guitarist on the Sunset Travelers single "On Jesus' Program."

== Stax Records and the 1960s ==
As a teenager, Frierson joined up with his younger sister, Mary, and their friends Marianne Brittenum and Wilbur Mondie to form the Drapels. They auditioned with Jim Stewart at Stax Records in 1963, and were offered a recording contract on the spot. The Drapels released two singles, "Wondering"/"Please Don't Leave" and "Young Man"/"Your Love Is All I Need," in 1964.

The next single they recorded was "After Laughter (Comes Tears)," which Frierson co-wrote with his sister. But while it had been recorded by the Drapels, it was released under his sister's stage name, Wendy Rene, in August 1964. It became a local hit, and she was subsequently sliced off from the group and promoted as a solo artist, going on to record and tour with other Stax artists before her retirement.

Frierson continued to work with Stax behind the scenes, recording backing vocals on songs by Rufus Thomas, Carla Thomas, and Otis Redding, as well as co-writing songs. He wrote for the Soulful Seven and helped write "I've Got a Feeling" with Lonnie Watson for Ollie & the Nightingales.

He also contributed to Royal Studios, co-writing the song "I'll Go Crazy" for Tony Ashley, and recorded for Hi Records under the name James Fry.

Frierson was also briefly involved in radical politics in this period, joining a black nationalist group in Memphis called the Invaders.

== Military service and later years ==
In 1970, Frierson was drafted to serve in the Vietnam War with the U.S. Army. The experience left him with post-traumatic stress disorder that would haunt him throughout his life.

After returning to Memphis, Frierson largely stayed out of the music business, only releasing one song, the 1975 gospel single "Can You Lose by Following God," as part of the band Whole Truth. Instead, he worked as a mechanic, carpenter, and teacher.

Another blow came in 1986, when his son died at only 16 years old. A few years later, in 1990, Frierson witnessed a brutal shooting that also scarred him.

But in the early 1990s, Frierson returned to music. He began hosting a gospel radio show on WEVL, a local freeform radio station. He also began writing and performing songs, some under the name Khafele Ajanaku; "Khafele" is a name used by the Chewa people that means "Worth Dying For," and "Ajanaku" was a spiritual name for an elephant in Yoruba poetry.

He recorded his new songs himself on a tape recorder at home, selling cassettes at corner stores and gospel music festivals around Memphis. These songs were religious, informed by his gospel beginnings, and the direct-to-tape recordings of Frierson singing and playing guitar have an intimate sound.

Meanwhile, his early co-written soul tune "After Laughter (Comes Tears)" was given a second life. It was remixed by the Wu-Tang Clan as "Tearz" in 1993, and Alicia Keys also sampled the song for "Where Do We Go From Here" in 2007.

Frierson died in April 2010, at age 64.

== Have You Been Good to Yourself ==
In 2012, his cassette tapes Real Education and Have You Been Good to Yourself were discovered at a thrift store by a local music collector, who recommended them to Light in the Attic Records, a label that specializes in reissues. Light in the Attic re-released the seven-song collection Have You Been Good to Yourself with the involvement of Frierson's daughter, Keesha, in 2016.

Commercial Appeal music critic Bob Mehr described the songs on Have You Been Good to Yourself as both "more melancholy and more meaningful" than Frierson's Stax recordings. The Memphis newspaper cited the reissue as part of its list of "The Best of Memphis Music" in 2016.

The song "Miracles" from the album was covered by Bonnie "Prince" Billy and Bill Callahan on their 2021 collaborative album Blind Date Party, featuring multi-instrumentalist Ty Segall. The song "Heavenly Father, You've Been Good" is sampled in Kanye West's 2026 song "Father" featuring Travis Scott.
