= Bill MacKay =

North American musician, composer, writer, singer

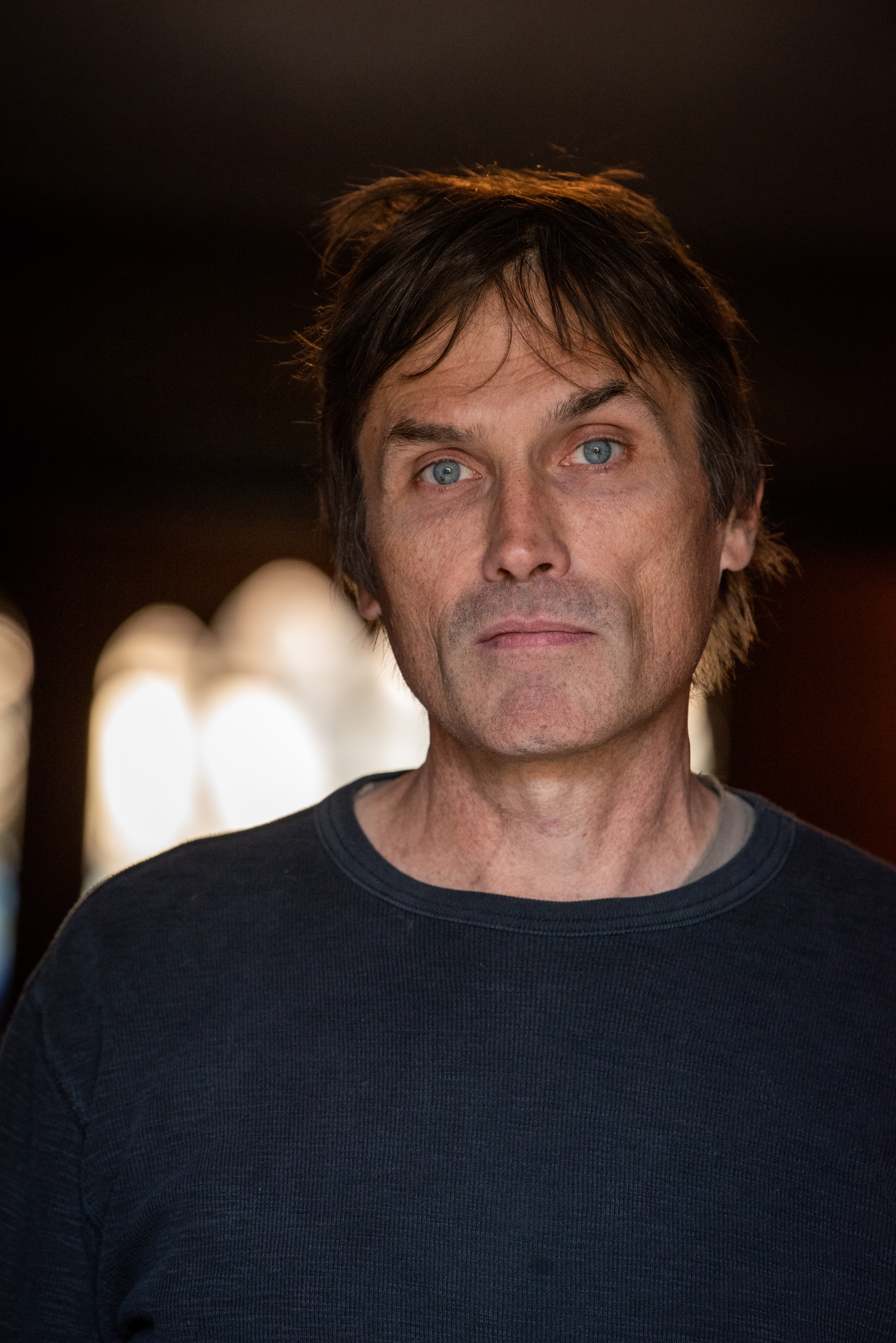
- Bill MacKay, 2022, Chicago.

Background information
- Born: William Dwight MacKay; Tarrytown, New York, United States
- Instruments: Guitar, voice, piano, bass, requinto, organ.
- Years active: 2002-Present
- Label: Drag City, Inc
- Website: www.billmackay.com

Bill MacKay is an American composer, guitarist and singer based in Chicago. He grew up in Pittsburgh, PA where he studied with guitarists Joe Negri and Eric Susoeff and in Rochester, NY where he studied with Kevin Morse. He also studied at Berklee College of Music.

In 2017 he began working with Chicago record label Drag City.

Mackay’s first Drag City release, Esker, was described by reviewer John Mulvey of Uncut "as a neat sampler of his unshowy virtuosity, at once brisk and mellow."

His arrangement of the Steely Dan song Deacon Blues appeared on the collaborative covers album by Bonnie Prince Billy and Bill Callahan, Blind Date Party (Drag City, 2021)

MacKay is a member of Black Duck, along with Douglas McCombs (Tortoise, Brokeback) on guitar and bass, and drummer Charles Rumback. and BCMC with Bitchin' Bajas' Cooper Crain.

In April 2023, MacKay's scored music for artist Michael Rakowitz' film I'm good at love, I'm good at hate, it's in between I freeze

MacKay has also been involved musically in theatre, appearing as musical guest in Chicago experimental theater troupe Neo-Futurists show Elements of Style in June 2023, and in Little Carl, a production by Theatre Y in April 2023.

"Among MacKay’s early inspirations were Miles Davis and Jimi Hendrix, but he also names British folk guitarist Davey Graham and Indian sarodist Ali Akbar Khan as influences."

MacKay's most recent solo record, Locust Land, was released May 23rd, 2024.

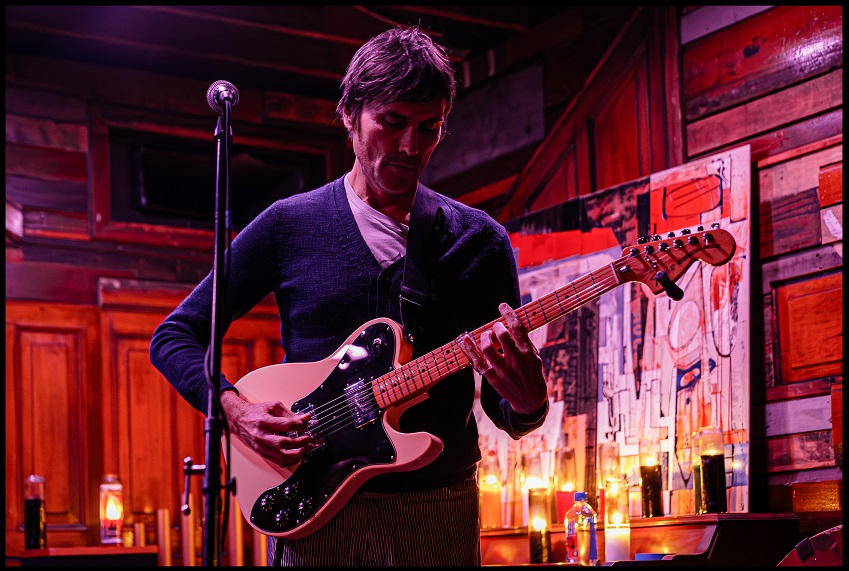
Bill MacKay at Acme Records in Milwaukee, Wisconsin on October 17th, 2024. Photo by Ryan Sarnowski.

== Discography ==
As Leader or Co-Leader

- Bill MacKay & Sounds of Now (2005)
- Swim to the River (2007) w/ Broken Things
- Bill MacKay and Darts & Arrows (2010)
- Eyes of the Carnival (2012) w/ Darts & Arrows
- December Concert (ears&eyes records, 2014) w/ Matt Lux
- Chatham Park (2014)
- Sunrise/Bill MacKay plays the songs of John Hulburt (Tompkins Square Records, 2015)
- Altamira (ears&eyes records, 2015) w/ Darts & Arrows
- Land of Plenty (Whistler Records, 2015) w/ Ryley Walker
- Esker (Drag City, 2017)
- SpiderBeetleBee (Drag City, 2017) w/ Ryley Walker
- Hypnotic Pulse of the Reindeer Range (JMY, 2017) w/ Ryley Walker
- Fountain Fire (Drag City, 2019)
- STIR (Drag City, 2019) w/ Katinka Kleijn
- Scarf (Drag City, 2020)
- Keys (Drag City, 2021) w/ Nathan Bowles
- Black Duck (Self-titled, Thrill Jockey, 2023) w/ Douglas McCombs, Charles Rumback
- BCMC - Foreign Smokes (Drag City, 2023) w/ Cooper Crain
- Locust Land (Drag City, 2024)
- BCMC - Stash (Drag City, 2026) w/Cooper Crain
- Black Duck with Elena Setién (Thrill Jockey, 2026) w/ Douglas McCombs, Charles Rumback

As Collaborator/Contributor

- Running out of Time (Delmark Records, 2005) w/ Savoir Faire
- Deafman Glance (Dead Oceans, 2018) w/ Ryley Walker
- Other You (Matador, 2021) w/Steve Gunn
- Course in Fable (Husky Pants Records, 2021) w/ Ryley Walker
- Blind Date Party (Drag City, 2021) w/Bill Callahan & Bonnie Prince Billy
- So Certain EP (Husky Pants Records, 2022) w/ Ryley Walker
- MESTIZX (Ibelisse Guardia Ferragutti & Frank Rosaly) (International Anthem, 2024)
- In Space (Drag City, 2025) w/ Edith Frost
