= Wild Love (album) =

Studio album by Smog
- Released: March 27, 1995
- Recorded: 1994–1995
- Genre: Lo-fi
- Length: 35:16
- Label: Drag City
- Producer: Rian Murphy

Smog chronology
Burning Kingdom (1994)	Wild Love (1995)	Kicking a Couple Around (1996)

Wild Love is the fourth album by Bill Callahan (also known as Smog), released on March 27, 1995, on Drag City and re-released in Europe on Domino in 2001. Jim O'Rourke appeared as cellist on this album, his first collaboration with Smog. Drag City's producer Rian Murphy helped to develop a wider musical palette than its predecessor Julius Caesar.

== Critical reception ==
Professional ratings
Review scores
Source	Rating
AllMusic	4.5/5 stars
Q	4/5 stars
The Rolling Stone Album Guide	3.5/5 stars

Wild Love has attracted favorable critical reviews. In a retrospective biography of Smog, AllMusic's Jason Ankeny called the album "a triumph of abject failure", seeing that it "reflected [Callahan's] bitter obsessions with stunning clarity."

Cat Power later covered "Bathysphere" on her 1996 album What Would the Community Think.

== Track listing ==
All tracks written by Bill Callahan, except where noted.

No.	Title	Writer(s)	Length
1.	"Bathysphere"		4:50
2.	"Wild Love"		1:35
3.	"Sweet Smog Children"		1:41
4.	"Bathroom Floor"	Callahan; Cynthia Dall	1:55
5.	"The Emperor"		1:11
6.	"Limited Capacity"		1:18
7.	"It's Rough"		4:45
8.	"Sleepy Joe"	Callahan; Dall	3:53
9.	"The Candle"		2:26
10.	"Be Hit"		2:23
11.	"Prince Alone in the Studio"	Callahan; Dall	7:15
12.	"Goldfish Bowl"		2:00
Total length:			35:16

== Personnel ==
- Bill Callahan – vocals, guitar, keyboards
- Cynthia Dall – guitar on tracks 8 and 11; vocals on track 11
- Jason Dezember – drums on track 10
- Ron Burns – drums on tracks 8, 11 and 12
- Ian O'Hey – Chamberlin on tracks 9 and 11
- Jim O'Rourke – cello on tracks 2, 4, 11 and 12
- Rian Murphy – production
- Konrad Strauss – engineering
