= Gold Record (album) =

Studio album by Bill Callahan
- Released: September 4, 2020
- Recorded: June 17–23, 2019
- Studio: Estuary (Austin, Texas)
- Length: 40:17
- Label: Drag City

Bill Callahan chronology
Shepherd in a Sheepskin Vest (2019)	Gold Record (2020)	Blind Date Party (2021)

Singles from Gold Record
- 1. "Pigeons" Released: June 29, 2020; 2. "Another Song" Released: July 6, 2020; 3. "35" Released: July 13, 2020; 4. "Protest Song" Released: July 20, 2020; 5. "The Mackenzies" Released: July 27, 2020; 6. "Let's Move to the Country" Released: August 3, 2020; 7. "Breakfast" Released: August 10, 2020; 8. "Cowboy" Released: August 17, 2020; 9. "Ry Cooder" Released: August 24, 2020

Gold Record is a studio album by American musician Bill Callahan, released on September 4, 2020, by Drag City. It is the seventh studio album released under his own name, and eighteenth overall when including studio albums released as Smog.

== Background ==
Gold Record was first announced on June 25, 2020. It was also announced that beginning on June 29, 2020, a new single would be released every week until the September 4, 2020, release date. Each weekly release was accompanied by a sketch drawn by Callahan. The sketches, which differed every week, were completed during preparations for a Shepherd in a Sheepskin Vest tour.

The album, which is named after the RIAA Gold certification, consists mainly of some of Callahan's old and unfinished songs. The album includes a revisitation of "Let’s Move to the Country", the opening song from Callahan's 1999 studio album Knock Knock.

Gold Record, which was recorded in one week, features accompaniment by guitarist Matt Kinsey, bassist Jamie Zurverza, and drummer Adam Jones.

== Critical reception ==
Professional ratings
Aggregate scores
Source	Rating
AnyDecentMusic?	8.1/10
Metacritic	86/100
Review scores
Source	Rating
AllMusic	4/5 stars
Exclaim!	8/10
The Guardian	5/5 stars
Loud and Quiet	6/10
Mojo	4/5 stars
NME	4/5 stars
Pitchfork	8.0/10
PopMatters	6/10 stars
Record Collector	5/5 stars
Uncut	8/10

Gold Record received positive reviews from critics upon its release. At Metacritic, which assigns a normalized rating out of 100 to reviews from mainstream publications, the album received an average score of 86, based on fifteen reviews, indicating "universal acclaim".

Kitty Empire of The Guardian praised the album and highlighted it as her album of the week. Empire noted that the writing in Gold Record is more oriented on others, as compared to Shepherd in a Sheepskin Vest, which she described as personal and introspective. She writes, "Continuing one of music’s great about-turns, the undersung one-time misanthrope releases an album abundant in warmth and empathy." Mike Goldsmith of Record Collector similarly praised Callahan for his shifting attitudes. Goldsmith also expressed, "While the album is intended as 10 individual slices of life, collective themes quickly emerge and turn it into more than the sum of its parts."

In a mixed review, Justin Vellucci of PopMatters suggested that the album has a sparse and very dry recording tone. According to Vellucci, one of the biggest shortcomings of Gold Record is that it "makes the distance between Callahan's hangdog narration and the music that accompanies it all the more obvious and all the more a chasm." In a more positive review for AllMusic, Heather Phares claimed that "Gold Record is especially satisfying for longtime fans as part of a bounty of great work from Callahan since his return, but there's plenty here to delight anyone who loves brilliant songwriting and down-to-earth performances."

=== Year-end lists ===
Publication	List	Rank	Ref.
Mojo	The 75 Best Albums of 2020	4	
Uncut	The Top 75 Albums of the Year	7	

== Track listing ==
All tracks are written by Bill Callahan.

No.	Title	Length
1.	"Pigeons"	5:25
2.	"Another Song"	3:15
3.	"35"	4:03
4.	"Protest Song"	3:58
5.	"The Mackenzies"	5:03
6.	"Let's Move to the Country"	3:19
7.	"Breakfast"	2:48
8.	"Cowboy"	4:35
9.	"Ry Cooder"	3:51
10.	"As I Wander"	3:56
Total length:		40:17

== Personnel ==
Credits adapted from the album's liner notes.

- Bill Callahan – vocals, guitar, synthesizer, percussion
- Matt Kinsey – electric guitar, acoustic guitar, bass (on "Another Song")
- Jaime Zuverza – bass
- Adam Jones – drums
- Carl Smith – baritone clarinet
- Derek Phelps – flugelhorn
- John Congleton – recording, mixing
- Dan Osborn – front cover
- Anubhav Saxena – highway photo
- Erik Pronske – automobile photo
- Hanly Banks Callahan – back cover

== Charts ==
Chart performance for Gold Record
Chart (2020)	Peak position
Scottish Albums (OCC)	19
Swiss Albums (Schweizer Hitparade)	74
UK Albums (OCC)	94
