= The Manta Rays of Time =

EP by Smog
- Released: 2000
- Recorded: 1999
- Genre: Lo-fi
- Length: 13:19
- Label: Spunk Records
- Producer: Bill Callahan

Smog chronology
Knock Knock (1999)	The Manta Rays of Time (2000)	Dongs of Sevotion (2000)

The Manta Rays of Time is Bill Callahan's fourth EP released under his Smog moniker. It was released in Australia only on Spunk Records in 2000. "Real Live Dress" later appeared on the 2002 rarities compilation Accumulation: None, while the remaining two tracks on the EP are exclusive to this release. Real Live Dress features elements from Baby Got Back by Sir Mix-a-Lot. When questioned on the use of these elements Bill said he thinks the lines are "pure and true" and that he included them without irony as he admired their "clarity".

== Track listing ==
All tracks are written by Bill Callahan.

No.	Title	Length
1.	"Real Live Dress"	5:25
2.	"Pure Sunshine"	4:03
3.	"Bored Bayou"	3:51
