= Sewn to the Sky =

Studio album by Smog
- Released: 1990 (LP on Disaster Records); November 17, 1995 (CD on Drag City); January 30, 1996 (LP on Drag City); 2001 (CD on Drag City)
- Genre: Experimental music
- Length: 37:58
- Labels: Disaster, Drag City

Smog chronology
| Sewn to the Sky (1990) | Floating (1991) |

Sewn to the Sky is an album by Smog, released in 1990 by Disaster Records. Most sources consider it to be Smog's first album, made after the release of several cassette-only recordings. It was re-released by Drag City in 1995. The experimental album combined home recording, substandard instruments and repetitive and noisy songwriting structures, and was an early example of the lo-fi genre.

The track "A Jar of Sand" was re-recorded for the 'Neath the Puke Tree EP in 2000.

== Production ==
The album was recorded in Georgia and Maryland. The liner notes say that it was recorded on a "dumpster Portastudio". Spin wrote that the recording "found [Callahan] relishing the process, with little regard for form or the guitar he was still learning to really play".

== Critical reception ==
Professional ratings
Review scores
| Source | Rating |
|---|---|
| AllMusic | 3/5 stars |
| The Encyclopedia of Popular Music | 3/5 stars |
| Pitchfork | 8.0/10 |
| (The New) Rolling Stone Album Guide | 2/5 stars |

Trouser Press wrote, "Suffused with the vague gray atmospherics suggested by the band’s name, Sewn to the Sky is primitive and promising." The New Yorker wrote that the album is a "discordant, inscrutable, and periodically frustrating collection of mostly instrumental, low-fidelity noise, and contains few hints of the lucid and tender folk music that he would be making almost thirty years later".

== Track listing ==
All tracks are written by Bill Callahan.

Side one
| No. | Title | Length |
|---|---|---|
| 1. | "Souped Up II" | 1:23 |
| 2. | "Kings Tongue" | 3:01 |
| 3. | "Garb" | 1:45 |
| 4. | "Hollow Out Cakes" | 2:14 |
| 5. | "Confederate Bills and Pinball Slugs" | 1:39 |
| 6. | "Coconut Cataract" | 1:14 |
| 7. | "Fruit Bats" | 1:14 |
| 8. | "Peach Pit" | 1:23 |
| 9. | "Disgust" | 0:49 |
| 10. | "Russian Winter" | 3:17 |

Side two
| No. | Title | Length |
|---|---|---|
| 1. | "Polio Shimmy" | 1:55 |
| 2. | "Smog" | 1:33 |
| 3. | "Lost My Key" | 4:00 |
| 4. | "Fried Piper" | 1:05 |
| 5. | "Fables" | 1:38 |
| 6. | "Puritan Work Ethic" | 2:21 |
| 7. | "A Jar of Sand" | 2:37 |
| 8. | "I Want to Tell You About a Man" | 1:01 |
| 9. | "Olive Drab Spectre" | 1:36 |
| 10. | "The Weightlifter" | 1:59 |
