= Wendy Rene =

- Also known as: Mary Cross
- Born: Mary Frierson; 1947; Memphis, Tennessee, United States
- Died: December 16, 2014 (aged 67)
- Genres: Soul, Rhythm and blues
- Occupation: Singer
- Years active: c.1962–1967, 2010
- Label: Stax

Mary Frierson, later Mary Cross (1947 – December 16, 2014), better known by her stage name of Wendy Rene, was an American soul singer and songwriter. She recorded for Stax Records in the mid 1960s.

== Biography ==
Mary Frierson was born in Memphis, Tennessee. Her father, Beauregard Frierson, Sr., was of mixed race and married a Memphis woman, Catherine Anderson, who was nearly 20 years his junior; the couple had three sons and one daughter. The family were members of the Church of God in Christ.

As a teenager, Mary Frierson formed a singing quartet, the Drapels, with her brother Johnnie Frierson and two friends, Marianne Brittenum and Wilbur Mondie. They auditioned for Stax co-founder Jim Stewart in 1963, and were immediately offered a recording contract. Before leaving, Mary showed Stewart some of the songs she had written, and was also offered a solo contract. While in her teens, she married a military man, but the young couple soon parted ways.

She needed a stage name, and several options came up including the name Wendy Storm, suggested by Stax receptionist-turned PR head Deanie Parker. Otis Redding then came up with the name Wendy Rene, which she preferred, and she used that name regularly as a solo artist. Her first solo single, "After Laughter (Comes Tears)", co-written with her brother, was released in August 1964, and became a local hit but failed to make the national R&B chart (the single did, however, reach Billboard's Bubbling Under Hot 100 Singles chart in Oct. 1964). The record featured Booker T. Jones on organ. The song had been recorded by the Drapels, but was released under Wendy Rene's name. The group split up soon afterwards.

Her second solo single, "Bar-B-Q", was released in November 1964, to cash in on the popularity of dance craze records. Featuring Steve Cropper on guitar, it failed to reach the charts. However, she continued to record and to tour with Stax stars, including Rufus Thomas and Otis Redding, and to sing backing vocals on their records. In 1967, she married songwriter and Stax employee James Cross. In December of that year, she was scheduled to fly with Redding and the Bar-Kays for what would have been her final live performance for the foreseeable future. A new mother, she backed out at the last minute to stay home with her child. Tragically, the plane crashed in Madison, Wisconsin leaving Redding and six others dead.

Wendy Rene then retired from the music business and, as Mary Cross, devoted herself to her family and church, the Bountiful Blessing Church of God in Christ in Memphis. She and James Cross have five sons and one daughter. In 2010, she returned to the stage briefly at the Ponderosa Stomp in New Orleans.

Several of her songs have been used in films (Gegen die Wand, The Fighting Temptations, Lucky Number Slevin, The Wackness, Felix and Meira, The Lady in the Car with Glasses and a Gun) and sampled/redone by current artists such as Wu-Tang Clan (in "Tearz"), Metro Boomin, Ariana Grande, Alicia Keys and Lykke Li. Rene's single "Bar-B-Q" was used in an episode of MTV's animated series Daria during its original airing, as well as a 2013 advertisement for Chili's Restaurant.

In 2003 Ace Records released a compilation CD of her recordings, You Thrill My Soul, which included several that were originally unreleased. Another compilation, After Laughter Comes Tears, was issued by Light in the Attic Records in 2012.

Wendy Rene died on December 16, 2014, after a stroke. She was 67.

== Discography ==
=== Singles ===
with Volt Records

- 1964: "Wondering" / "Please Don't Leave" (with The Drapels)
- 1964: "Young Man" / "Your Love Is All I Need" (with The Drapels)

with Stax Records

- 1964: "After Laughter (Comes Tears)" / "What Will Tomorrow Bring"
- 1964: "Bar-B-Q" / "Young and Foolish"
- 1965: "Give You What I Got" / "Reap What You Sow"

=== Compilations ===
- 2003: You Thrill My Soul (Ace Records)
- 2012: After Laughter Comes Tears: Complete Stax & Volt Singles + Rarities 1964–1965 (Light In The Attic Records)

=== Soundtracks ===
- "After Laughter" – Lucky Number Slevin
- "After Laughter" – Gegen die Wand (Head-On)
- "Bar-B-Q" – Once Upon a Time in the Midlands
- "After Laughter" – The Wackness
- "After Laughter" – Felix & Meira
- "After Laughter" – La dame dans l'auto avec des lunettes et un fusil
- "After Laughter" – This is England '88
