= Meat Cake =

Comic book series by Dame Darcy

- The cover of Meat Cake #1 (Fantagraphics, 1993), artwork by Dame Darcy.

Publication information
- Publisher: Caliber Press; Fantagraphics
- Schedule: Annually
- Publication date: 1992–2008
- No. of issues: 17
- Main character(s): Effluvia the Mermaid, Wax Wolf, Igpay the Pig Latin pig, Stregapez, Hindrance and Perfidia, Scampi the Selfish Shellfish, Friend the Girl, Richard Dirt

Creative team
- Created by: Dame Darcy
- Written by: Dame Darcy
- Artist(s): Dame Darcy
- Editor(s): Gary Groth

Collected editions
- Dame Darcy's Meat Cake Compilation: ISBN 978-1560975328
- The Meat Cake Bible: ISBN 978-1606999103

Meat Cake is a comic book series written and drawn by American cartoonist Dame Darcy. Originally published by Caliber Press, Meat Cake was published by Fantagraphics in the United States from 1993 to 2008.

Meat Cake has been described as "neo-Victorian", with each issue containing a collection of stories featuring a cast of oddball characters. All the same, Meat Cake was characterized by one critic as extremely personal: "the aesthetic that made Meatcake so distinctive wasn't cultivated; it was who [Dame Darcy] was, and how she was".

== Publication history ==
One issue of Meat Cake was published in 1992 by Caliber Press.

In 1993 Fantagraphics picked up Meat Cake as an ongoing series, starting over the numbering with issue #1. Early issues were produced approximately every 6 months, but by issue #8, only one issue was published per year, until issue #17 (2008). No new issues of Meat Cake have appeared since.

=== Collected editions ===
- Dame Darcy's Meat Cake Compilation (Fantagraphics, 2003; reprint edition, 2010) ISBN 978-1560975328 — collects material from the first decade of the comic; includes "Hungry is the Heart", a collaboration between Dame Darcy and Alan Moore
- The Meat Cake Bible (Fantagraphics, 2016) ISBN 978-1606999103 — every story from all 17 issues (1993-2008), as well as new stories from the unpublished 18th issue

== Recurring characters ==
- Effluvia the Mermaid
- Wax Wolf — a roguish roué
- Igpay the Pig Latin pig
- Stregapez — a woman who speaks by dispensing Pez-like tablets through a bloody hole in her throat
- Hindrance and Perfidia — mischievous Siamese twins
- Scampi the Selfish Shellfish
- Friend the Girl
- Richard Dirt — a blond bombshell
