= Goat Songs =

EP by The Sundowners
- Released: 1993
- Genres: Lo-fi, folk
- Labels: Sea Note; SN4
- Producer: The Sundowners

Goat Songs is a 7" vinyl EP by The Sundowners, released on Sea Note Records in 1993. The EP is a collaboration between Palace Brothers (Will Oldham) and Smog (Bill Callahan). The EP was reissued on 21 May 1994.

== Track listing ==
1. "Turkey Vulture"
2. "Tonight Will Be Fine" (Leonard Cohen)
3. "Punk Rock"
4. "Goats"
5. "Pozor"
6. "Tallulah"
