= Michael Ausserbauer =

Michael Ausserbauer (Blue Mike)
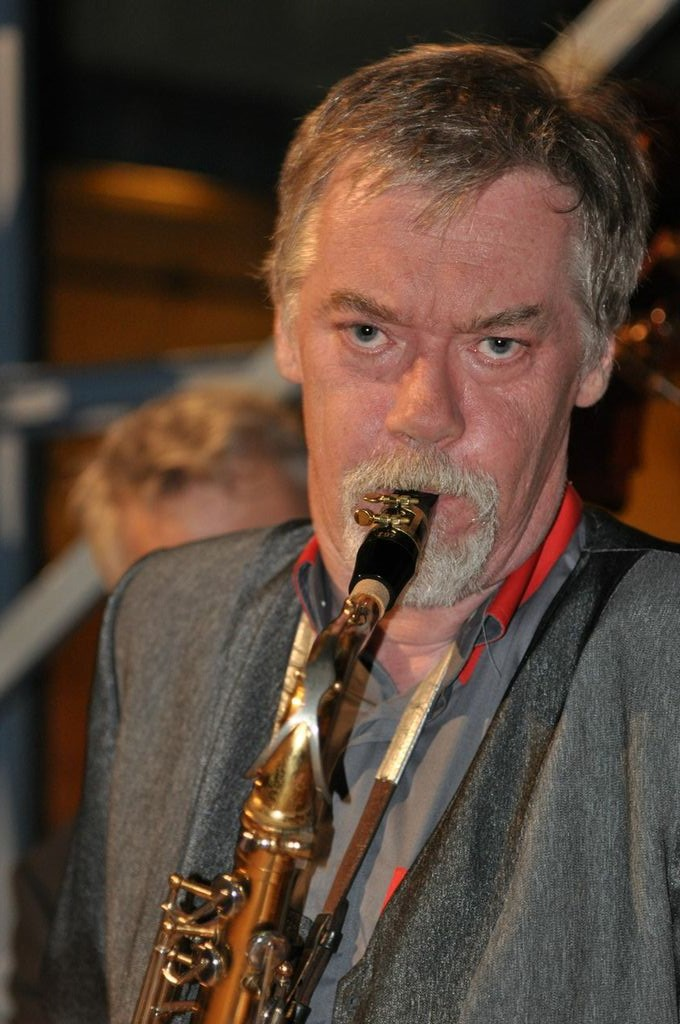
- Michael Ausserbauer at Landau a.d. Isar, Germany. 2011

Background information
- Born: 8 March 1961 (age 64)
- Origin: Munich, Germany
- Genres: Jazz, blues, bebop, funk, swing, pop
- Occupations: Saxophonist, songwriter, arranger, bandleader, writer
- Instruments: Tenor saxophone; baritone saxophone; alto saxophone; soprano saxophone; sopranino saxophone; flute; bassoon; EWI
- Years active: 1978-present

Michael Ausserbauer (Außerbauer) (born 8 March 1961), also known as Blue Mike, is a musician, saxophonist, composer, arranger and writer.

== Biography ==
Ausserbauer started playing the soprano saxophone at the age of 16. Soon he discovered the tenor saxophone as a new passion. After learning how to play the saxophone by himself, he learned to play under the tutelage of Josef Fischhaber at the KMS Erding.

His first band was MESA, and then he joined the Manfred Anneser-Quartett. In 1978 he formed "Das Trio" with Jack Lear and Ernst Seibt. "Das Trio" also performed with Edgar Hoffmann. In 1980 Ausserbauer joined Music Liberation Unit (with Franz Dannebauer) and toured Germany. In 1981 he wrote a biography about John Coltrane together with Gerd Filtgen.

During 1981–1996 he was the main saxophonist of the Al Jones Blues Band. The Al Jones Blues Band toured Europe several times and played with famous musicians, such as B.B. King, Champion Jack Dupree, Johnny Winter. The band is one of the most famous blues bands outside the US.

Ausserbauer also played with other musicians such as Eddie C. Campbell, Sal Nistico, Axel Zwingenberger, Vince Weber, Ralf Schicha, Pete Roycroft, Michael Fitz, Luther Allison, Charly Antolini, Gerry Hayes, Peter Tuscher, George Green, Edir and Pery dos Santos, Eddie Taylor, Edgar Hoffmann, Rick Keller, Paul van Lier, William Powell, Albert C. Humphrey and Oskar Klein.

He wrote and played soundtracks for BR (Bayerischer Rundfunk) movies and arranged and composed music for orchestras. In 1996, Ausserbauer recorded the CD "Grenzenüberschreiten" with painter Werner Classen, creating one piece of art combining paintings with music.

Georg Karger, Yogo Pausch, Michael Alf and Christian Ludwig Auwald have been joining Ausserbauer in the MAQ (Michael Ausserbauer Quartett) since 2005.

Blue Mike is a well known saxophonist and composer in Germany and appeared on several German newspapers and in TV. Ausserbauer also uses YouTube. He still lives in Germany and has started a new band called "Tenor Steps".

== Musical style ==
Ausserbauer had many influences in his musical career. He started as an autodidact and learned quickly, hearing and playing songs by John Coltrane, Charlie Parker, Sonny Rollins and other musicians. His technique was remarkably good at this early phase. His sound was raw and full-bodied, showing influences of saxophonists like Stanley Turrentine. Ausserbauer soon began to compose music and proved to have a sense for composition.

After leaving Al Jones Blues Band in 1996 he developed a new musical style. In this second phase, Ausserbauer improved his technique and became a more virtuosic player. His sound changed in a unique way; it became higher, more clear and brutal. At this time he played many covers on YouTube.

Ausserbauer's third phase is a young phase, in which he shows other influences in technique and sound. The interesting change is the sound: it is more like the early phase with more passion. It became darker and high notes became more voluminous. Without losing his unique sound, the way Ausserbauer plays shows influences by Michael Brecker, James Carter and John Klemmer.

== Discography ==
- 1979 Music Liberation Unit: Love Go
- 1981 Al Jones: Movin' 'n' Groovin'
- 1987 Ludwig Seuß: Marilyn Sessions
- 1989 Al Jones: Hot´n´Heavy
- 1992 Michael Fitz: Gefühlsecht
- 1994 Ludwig Seuss: Second's Out
- 1995 Al Jones: Watch this!
- 1996 Grenzenüberschreiten
- 1998 Landluft: A so g'heats gmacht
- 2009 MAQ: Dedications
- 2012 Romantik Pur
- 2012 Wellness Pur
- 2012 Klassik Pur
- 2015 Tenor Steps: Get It
- 2017 Jazz on Vinyl
- 2019 Duets - Jazz on Vinyl
- 2020 Kisses
- 2021 Richie Necker: New songs and untold stories
- 2021 Siegmar Zerrath: Five to Four
- 2021 Rattlesnake Torpedos: Corona Edition
- 2022 All those Cats
