= Blind Date Party =

Studio album by Bill Callahan and Bonnie "Prince" Billy
- Released: December 10, 2021
- Genre: Folk; country; rock
- Length: 90:00
- Label: Drag City

Bill Callahan chronology
Gold Record (2020)	Blind Date Party (2021)	Ytilaer (2022)

Bonnie "Prince" Billy chronology
Superwolves (2021)	Blind Date Party (2021)	Keeping Secrets Will Destroy You (2023)

Blind Date Party is a collaborative studio album by Bill Callahan and Bonnie "Prince" Billy, released on December 10, 2021, via Drag City. The project consists of covers of other artists' songs, featuring guest various appearances, many of which are from the duo's Drag City labelmates.

== Reception ==
Blind Date Party ratings
Aggregate scores
Source	Rating
Metacritic	82/100
Review scores
Source	Rating
AllMusic	4/5 stars
Backseat Mafia	7.9/10
The Guardian	4/5 stars
Mojo	4/5 stars
Northern Transmissions	9/10
Pitchfork	7.5/10
Spectrum Culture	35/100
Uncut	8/10

According to the review aggregator Metacritic, Blind Date Party received "universal acclaim" based on a weighted average score of 82 out of 100 from 6 critic scores.

== Track listing ==
Blind Date Party track listing
No.	Title	Original by	Length
1.	"Blackness of the Night" (featuring Azita)	Yusuf Islam	3:45
2.	"OD'd in Denver" (featuring Matt Sweeney)	Hank Williams Jr.	3:30
3.	"I've Made My Mind Up" (featuring Alasdair Roberts)	Dave Rich	4:27
4.	"Red Tailed Hawk" (featuring Matt Kinsey)	The Other Years	2:40
5.	"Wish You Were Gay" (featuring Sean O'Hagan)	Billie Eilish	3:54
6.	"Our Anniversary" (featuring Dead Rider)	Smog	5:19
7.	"Rooftop Garden" (featuring George Xylouris)	Lou Reed	6:20
8.	"Deacon Blues" (featuring Bill MacKay)	Steely Dan	7:17
9.	"I Love You" (featuring David Pajo)	Jerry Jeff Walker	6:41
10.	"Sea Song" (featuring Mick Turner)	Robert Wyatt	7:21
11.	"I've Been the One" (featuring Meg Baird)	Little Feat	3:55
12.	"Miracles" (featuring Ty Segall)	Johnnie Frierson	4:17
13.	"I Want to Go to the Beach" (featuring Cooper Crain)	Iggy Pop	5:34
14.	"Night Rider's Lament" (featuring Cory Hanson)	Michael Burton	4:59
15.	"Arise, Therefore" (featuring Six Organs of Admittance)	Palace Music	3:24
16.	"The Night of Santiago" (featuring David Grubbs)	Leonard Cohen	4:16
17.	"The Wild Kindness" (featuring Cassie Berman)	Silver Jews	3:32
18.	"Lost in Love" (featuring Emmett Kelly)	Air Supply	4:05
19.	"She Is My Everything" (featuring Sir Richard Bishop)	John Prine	4:46
Total length:			90:00

== Charts ==
Chart performance for Blind Date Party
Chart (2022)	Peak position
Austrian Albums (Ö3 Austria)	46
Belgian Albums (Ultratop Flanders)	101
German Albums (Offizielle Top 100)	35
Scottish Albums (Official Charts)	53
Swiss Albums (Schweizer Hitparade)	51
UK Independent Albums (Official Charts)	21
