= Burning Kingdom =

EP by Smog
- Released: September 19, 1994
- Recorded: 1994
- Genre: Lo-fi
- Length: 20:34
- Labels: Drag City (U.S.); Domino (UK)
- Producer: Bill Callahan

Smog chronology
Julius Caesar (1993)	Burning Kingdom (1994)	Wild Love (1995)

Professional ratings
Review scores
Source	Rating
AllMusic	3.5/5 stars

Burning Kingdom is the second EP by Bill Callahan (also known as Smog), released on Drag City in 1994 and later re-released in Europe on Domino. "My Shell" is an electric version of the 1991 single of the same name.

This EP is the first of two collaborations between Callahan and the drummer Ron Burns, as well as the beginning of his work with Cynthia Dall. She provided vocals to "Renée Died 1:45". Steven Zdybel played violin and Kim Osterwalder played cello, as she did on the Julius Caesar album.

== Track listing ==
All tracks are written by Bill Callahan, except where noted.

No.	Title	Writer(s)	Length
1.	"My Shell (Electric Version)"		5:47
2.	"Renée Died 1:45"	Callahan/Dall	1:50
3.	"My Family"		3:33
4.	"Drunk on the Stars"		4:18
5.	"Not Lonely Anymore"		2:03
6.	"The Desert"		2:59

== Personnel ==
- Bill Callahan – vocals, guitar
- Cynthia Dall – vocals, guitar (2)
- Ron Burns – drums
- Kim Osterwalder – cello
- Steven Ldybel – violin
