= Shepherd in a Sheepskin Vest =

Studio album by Bill Callahan
- Released: June 14, 2019
- Recorded: August 2018–January 2019
- Studio: Wonder Chamber, Austin, Texas
- Length: 63:35
- Label: Drag City

Bill Callahan chronology
Have Fun with God (2014)	Shepherd in a Sheepskin Vest (2019)	Gold Record (2020)

Shepherd in a Sheepskin Vest is a studio album by American musician Bill Callahan, released on June 14, 2019, by Drag City. It is the sixth studio album released under his own name, and seventeenth overall when including LPs released as Smog.

Shepherd in a Sheepskin Vest is a double album with twenty tracks and over sixty-three minutes in length, making it Callahan's longest album to date. The album received favorable reviews, with Pitchfork contributing editor Jayson Greene referring to it as a "highlight of his career".

== Release and promotion ==
The album was announced on May 2, 2019. The first three sides of the album were released digitally weeks apart before the album's release. The first side was released on May 23, 2019, the second side on May 30, 2019, and the third on June 6, 2019.

The album was premiered for early streaming through NPR's First Listen series starting on June 6, 2019.

== Critical reception ==
Professional ratings
Aggregate scores
Source	Rating
AnyDecentMusic?	8.2/10
Metacritic	88/100
Review scores
Source	Rating
AllMusic	4/5 stars
Exclaim!	9/10
The Guardian	5/5 stars
The Irish Times	4/5 stars
Mojo	4/5 stars
NME	4/5 stars
The Observer	4/5 stars
Pitchfork	8.5/10
Q	4/5 stars
Uncut	9/10

Shepherd in a Sheepskin Vest received positive reviews from critics upon its release. At Metacritic, which assigns a normalized rating out of 100 to reviews from mainstream publications, the album received an average score of 88, based on 22 reviews.

Laura Snapes of The Guardian praised the album as a "brilliantly sly celebration of family and the infinite". In his review for Pitchfork, Jayson Greene called the album "his warmest, his most generous, possibly his most profound. It is his longest, for sure, lounging comfortably across four sides of vinyl, none of it wasted. It is a high note, fond and deep and sustained."

== Track listing ==
All tracks are written by Bill Callahan, except where noted.

No.	Title	Writer(s)	Length
1.	"Shepherd's Welcome"		2:22
2.	"Black Dog on the Beach"		2:30
3.	"Angela"		2:47
4.	"The Ballad of the Hulk"		4:04
5.	"Writing"		3:06
6.	"Morning Is My Godmother"		2:10
7.	"747"		3:26
8.	"Watch Me Get Married"		3:10
9.	"Young Icarus"		2:48
10.	"Released"		2:22
11.	"What Comes After Certainty"		3:42
12.	"Confederate Jasmine"		3:40
13.	"Call Me Anything"		2:26
14.	"Son of the Sea"		4:13
15.	"Camels"		2:59
16.	"Circles"		2:28
17.	"When We Let Go"		2:17
18.	"Lonesome Valley"	Traditional	4:16
19.	"Tugboats and Tumbleweeds"		4:12
20.	"The Beast"		4:37
Total length:			63:35

== Personnel ==
Credits adapted from liner notes.

Musicians

- Bill Callahan – vocals, acoustic guitar, Moog synthesizer, percussion, bowed psaltery, bowed banjo, harmonica, Wurlitzer electric piano, Casio SK-1, drum machine, mellotron, piano, kalimba, organ, bells
- Brian Beattie – upright bass, acoustic bass, electric upright bass (4), percussion, piano, pump organ, Hammond organ, Moog synthesizer, mellotron, celesta, marimbula, bells
- Matt Kinsey – acoustic guitar, percussion
- Adam Jones – drumkit
- Dony Wynn – drumkit (3, 7, 14)
- Gary Newcomb – lap steel guitar
- Hanly Banks Callahan – backing vocals (18)
- Tori Olds – backing vocals (6, 18)

Technical

- Brian Beattie – recording, mixing
- JJ Golden – mastering

Packaging

- Joanna Skumanich – front and back cover drawings
- Dan Osborn – layout

== Charts ==
Chart (2019)	Peak position
Belgian Albums (Ultratop Flanders)	21
Belgian Albums (Ultratop Wallonia)	99
Dutch Albums (Album Top 100)	58
French Albums (SNEP)	168
German Albums (Offizielle Top 100)	56
Irish Albums (IRMA)	81
Scottish Albums (OCC)	17
Spanish Albums (PROMUSICAE)	51
Swiss Albums (Schweizer Hitparade)	56
UK Albums (OCC)	37
UK Independent Albums (OCC)	3
US Folk Albums (Billboard)	11
US Independent Albums (Billboard)	5
