= Cynthia Dall =

- Also known as: Cindy Dall
- Born: Cynthia Meggin Loya; March 12, 1971; Roseville, California, United States
- Died: April 5, 2012 (aged 41) Sacramento, California, United States
- Occupations: Musician, photographer
- Instruments: Vocals, guitar
- Years active: 1996-2012

Cynthia Dall (born Cynthia Meggin Loya; March 12, 1971 – April 5, 2012) was an American lo-fi musician and photographer. She gained notoriety in the fanzine world of the 1990s for her frequent transgressive-styled cover shots and appearances in Lisa Carver's Rollerderby magazine.

== Profile ==
Dall was born in Roseville, California. She started recording and performing with then-boyfriend, Bill Callahan under his former moniker, Smog. She first appeared on the Smog song "Wine Stained Lips", which was a B-side to the 1994 "A Hit" 7" single. Dall went on to contribute vocals and guitar on the Burning Kingdom EP, Wild Love, and The Doctor Came at Dawn, and she toured with Smog in the US and Europe in 1995.

In 1996, Dall released her first solo album, Untitled. The original pressing of the LP had no artist name on the sleeve at the time, but Dall's name was later added for re-pressings. The album featured engineering work by Jim O'Rourke, and guitar and vocals by Callahan.

In 1998, she provided vocals for a remix of "Torture Day" by The Notwist.

In 2002, Dall released her second album, Sound Restores Young Men, which was recorded by O'Rourke and Tim Green of The Fucking Champs.

Dall had epilepsy. She also engaged in political activism around Sacramento, helping citizens register to vote.

Dall died in her home in Sacramento on April 5, 2012. According to her record label, she was in the process of working on demos for a new album of material.

== Discography ==
- Untitled, Drag City No. 73 (1996)
- Sound Restores Young Men, Drag City No. 132 (2002)
