= Apocalypse (Bill Callahan album) =

Studio album by Bill Callahan
- Released: April 5, 2011
- Recorded: September 2010
- Studio: Sonic Ranch
- Genre: Folk; psychedelic folk; Americana
- Length: 40:24
- Label: Drag City
- Producer: Bill Callahan

Bill Callahan chronology
Sometimes I Wish We Were an Eagle (2009)	Apocalypse (2011)	Dream River (2013)

Professional ratings
Aggregate scores
Source	Rating
AnyDecentMusic?	7.9/10
Metacritic	75/100
Review scores
Source	Rating
AllMusic	4/5 stars
The A.V. Club	B+
The Daily Telegraph	4/5 stars
The Independent	4/5 stars
Mojo	4/5 stars
Pitchfork	8.0/10
Q	2/5 stars
Rolling Stone	3.5/5 stars
Spin	7/10
Uncut	4/5 stars

Apocalypse is a studio album by Bill Callahan, released on April 5, 2011. It is the third studio album released under his own name, and fourteenth overall when including LPs released as Smog.

Mojo and Pitchfork both placed Apocalypse at number 23 on their respective lists of the best albums of 2011, while Uncut placed the album at number 25. In 2019, Pitchfork ranked the album at number 39 on its list of "The 200 Best Albums of the 2010s". In 2021, Beats Per Minute placed the album at number 38 in its "Top 50 Albums of the 2010s."

== Track listing ==
No.	Title	Length
1.	"Drover"	5:24
2.	"Baby's Breath"	5:30
3.	"America!"	5:33
4.	"Universal Applicant"	5:53
5.	"Riding for the Feeling"	6:05
6.	"Free's"	3:13
7.	"One Fine Morning"	8:46

== Personnel ==
- Bill Callahan – vocals, classical guitar, electric guitar, snare, production
- Brian Beattie – bass, mixing
- Gordon Butler – fiddle
- John Congleton – recording
- Luke Franco – flute
- Matt Kinsey – bass, electric guitar
- Jonathan Meiburg – Wurlitzer electric piano, piano
- Neal Morgan – drums
- Roger Seibel – mastering

== Charts ==
Chart (2011)	Peak position
Belgian Albums (Ultratop Flanders)	83
Dutch Albums (Album Top 100)	87
German Albums (Offizielle Top 100)	49
Irish Albums (IRMA)	80
Swedish Albums (Sverigetopplistan)	37
UK Albums (OCC)	116
UK Independent Albums (OCC)	16
US Americana/Folk Albums (Billboard)	6
US Heatseekers Albums (Billboard)	13
