= Red Apple Falls =

Studio album by Smog
- Released: May 20, 1997
- Recorded: October 30 – November 3, 1996
- Genre: Lo-fi
- Length: 43:20
- Label: Drag City
- Producers: Jim O'Rourke; Bill Callahan

Smog chronology
The Doctor Came at Dawn (1996)	Red Apple Falls (1997)	Knock Knock (1999)

Singles from Red Apple Falls
- 1. "Ex-Con" Released: 1997

Professional ratings
Review scores
Source	Rating
AllMusic	4.5/5 stars
The Guardian	3/5 stars
NME	8/10
The Rolling Stone Album Guide	4.5/5 stars
Select	4/5
Uncut	2/5 stars

Red Apple Falls is the sixth album by Smog (the alias of Bill Callahan), released in May 1997 on Drag City and re-released in Europe in 2001 by Domino.

== Background ==
Red Apple Falls was recorded by Jim O'Rourke and Callahan, with assistance from Phil Bonnet. It is the first of two Smog records produced by O'Rourke, and Callahan's third team-up with O'Rourke. O'Rourke also plays bass guitar, piano, Hammond organ, hurdy-gurdy and drums on the album.

== Songs ==
"Ex-Con" was released as a single. An early version of "Red Apples" first appeared on Callahan's first EP Floating in 1991, and was later covered by Cat Power for her album The Covers Record. "I Was a Stranger" was redone by Callahan for the 2000 EP 'Neath the Puke Tree.

== Track listing ==
All tracks are written by Bill Callahan.

No.	Title	Length
1.	"The Morning Paper"	3:22
2.	"Blood Red Bird"	4:01
3.	"Red Apples"	5:06
4.	"I Was a Stranger"	3:23
5.	"To Be of Use"	5:41
6.	"Red Apple Falls"	6:49
7.	"Ex-Con"	3:35
8.	"Inspirational"	6:25
9.	"Finer Days"	4:50
