= Dongs of Sevotion =

Studio album by Smog
- Released: April 4, 2000
- Genres: Lo-fi; indie rock
- Length: 61:15
- Labels: Drag City; Domino
- Producer: Smog

Smog chronology
| The Manta Rays of Time (2000) | Dongs of Sevotion (2000) | Strayed (2000) |

Singles from Dongs of Sevotion
- 1. "Strayed" Released: July 17, 2000

Dongs of Sevotion is the eighth studio album by Smog. It was released on April 3, 2000, in Europe by Domino Recording Company and a day later in North America by Drag City. It peaked at number 28 on the UK Independent Albums Chart.

== Critical reception ==
Professional ratings
Aggregate scores
| Source | Rating |
|---|---|
| Metacritic | 85/100 |
Review scores
| Source | Rating |
| AllMusic | 4/5 stars |
| The Guardian | 3/5 stars |
| The Independent | 4/5 stars |
| NME | 8/10 |
| Pitchfork | 9.3/10 |
| Q | 4/5 stars |
| The Rolling Stone Album Guide | 3.5/5 stars |
| Select | 3/5 |
| The Times | 9/10 |
| Uncut | 5/5 stars |

At Metacritic, which assigns a weighted average score out of 100 to reviews from mainstream critics, Dongs of Sevotion received an average score of 85, based on 10 reviews, indicating "universal acclaim".

Pitchfork placed Dongs of Sevotion at number 10 on its list of the top 20 albums of 2000. NME named it the year's 27th-best album.

== Track listing ==
All tracks are written by Bill Callahan.

| No. | Title | Length |
|---|---|---|
| 1. | "Justice Aversion" | 4:50 |
| 2. | "Dress Sexy at My Funeral" | 5:30 |
| 3. | "Strayed" | 6:05 |
| 4. | "The Hard Road" | 2:47 |
| 5. | "Easily Led" | 3:00 |
| 6. | "Bloodflow" | 7:18 |
| 7. | "Nineteen" | 6:21 |
| 8. | "Distance" | 7:54 |
| 9. | "Devotion" | 5:55 |
| 10. | "Cold Discovery" | 5:56 |
| 11. | "Permanent Smile" | 5:39 |

== Personnel ==
Credits adapted from liner notes.

- Bill Callahan – vocals, guitar, piano, hammond organ, synthesizer, jaw harp
- Jennifer Collins – backing vocals
- Nicole Evans – backing vocals
- Damian Rogers – backing vocals
- Jeff Parker – guitar
- Matt Lux – bass guitar, upright bass
- Richard Schuler – drums
- John McEntire – drums, percussion, recording, mixing
- Phil Bonnet – recording
- Joe Dilillo – recording
- John Towner – recording

== Charts ==
| Chart (2000) | Peak position |
|---|---|
| UK Independent Albums (Official Charts) | 28 |
