= My Days of 58 =

Studio album by Bill Callahan
- Released: February 27, 2026
- Recorded: May, 2025–June, 2025
- Studios: Cedar Creek Studios, Austin, Texas
- Genres: Alternative rock, indie folk, Americana
- Length: 60:45
- Label: Drag City

Bill Callahan chronology
Ytilaer (2022)	My Days of 58 (2026)

My Days of 58 is a studio album by American musician Bill Callahan, released on February 27, 2026, by Drag City. It is the ninth solo studio album Callahan released under his own name and his twentieth overall when including studio albums released as Smog.

== Critical reception ==
Professional ratings
Aggregate scores
Source	Rating
Metacritic	82/100
Review scores
Source	Rating
AllMusic	4/5 stars
Mojo	4/5 stars
Pitchfork	7.8/10
The Skinny	5/5 stars
The Telegraph	4/5 stars

My Days of 58 received positive reviews from critics upon its release. At Metacritic, which assigns a normalized rating out of 100 to reviews from mainstream publications, the album received an average score of 82, based on 16 reviews.

A team of critics from The Telegraph listed it among "the best albums of 2026 so far". Liam Casci from The Skinny called the album "incredibly contemplative yet focused". In her review of the album for AllMusic, Heather Phares said "Pairing thoughtful craft with spontaneity is no easy feat, but My Days of 58's songs do it effortlessly." of the album.

== Track listing ==
All tracks are written by Bill Callahan.

No.	Title	Length
1.	"Why Do Men Sing"	6:58
2.	"The Man I'm Supposed to Be"	3:42
3.	"Pathol O.G."	6:03
4.	"Stepping Out For Air"	7:23
5.	"Lonely City"	5:10
6.	"Empathy"	5:19
7.	"West Texas"	4:51
8.	"Computer"	3:47
9.	"Lake Winnebago"	3:51
10.	"Highway Born"	4:47
11.	"And Dream Land"	4:25
12.	"The World is Still"	4:29
Total length:		60:45

== Personnel ==
Musicians

- Bill Callahan – vocals, guitar, Irish whistle, synthesizer
- Bill McCullough – Pedal Steel
- Chris Vreeland – Bass
- Dustin Laurenzi – clarinet, horn arrangements, saxophone
- Eve Searls – backing vocals
- Jerry David DeCicca – tambourine
- Jim White – drums
- Matt Kinsey – bass, guitar
- Mike St. Clair – trombone
- Patrick Thrasher – piano
- Richard Bowden – fiddle

Technical

- Chris Shaw – engineer, mixing
- Paul Gold – mastering

Packaging

- Bill McCullough – cover photo

== Charts ==
Chart (2026)	Peak position
UK Albums (Official Charts)	32
German Albums (Offizielle Top 100)	80
Belgian Albums (Ultratop Flanders)	36
