= Kicking a Couple Around =

EP by Smog
- Released: April 29, 1996
- Recorded: 1994–1996
- Genre: Lo-fi
- Length: 19:46
- Labels: Drag City (U.S.); Domino (France, Germany, UK)
- Producers: Mike Engles, Steve Albini

Smog chronology
Wild Love (1995)	Kicking a Couple Around (1996)	The Doctor Came at Dawn (1996)

Professional ratings
Review scores
Source	Rating
AllMusic	4/5 stars

Kicking a Couple Around is an EP by Bill Callahan (also known as Smog). It was released on Drag City in April 1996 and re-released in Europe on Domino in 2001. "Your New Friend" was recorded during a 1995 John Peel radio session. "Back in School," "I Break Horses," and "The Orange Glow of a Stranger's Living Room" were recorded by Steve Albini.

In an interview, Callahan said that "I Break Horses" was written "to help a friend try to understand how a guy she had a one-night stand with could possibly not return her phone calls the next day or ever again."

== Critical reception ==
Trouser Press praised “The Orange Glow of a Stranger’s Living Room,” writing that it "lets some lovely picking and piano pierce the warm gloom of [Smog's] abiding displacement." The Washington Post called the EP "four delicate, downbeat songs that have a trad-country mournfulness."

== Track listing ==
All tracks are written by Bill Callahan.

No.	Title	Length
1.	"Your New Friend"	6:51
2.	"Back in School"	4:40
3.	"I Break Horses"	4:44
4.	"The Orange Glow of a Stranger's Living Room"	3:26
