= Dream River =

Studio album by Bill Callahan
- Released: September 17, 2013
- Recorded: January 2013
- Studio: Cacophony, Texas
- Genre: Indie folk
- Length: 40:09
- Label: Drag City
- Producer: Erik Wofford

Bill Callahan chronology
Apocalypse (2011)	Dream River (2013)	Have Fun with God (2014)

Dream River is the fifteenth studio album by American singer-songwriter Bill Callahan, released on September 17, 2013, on Drag City. Recorded by Erik Wofford, the album is Callahan's fourth to be released under his own name.

Released to critical acclaim, the album reached number forty-four on the UK Albums Chart.

== Background and recording ==
Bill Callahan began writing songs for Dream River in August 2012, with the idea of it becoming an album to listen to late at night. Callahan noted, "[Dream River is] the last record you could listen to at the end of the day, before you go to bed, around midnight. [I wanted it to be] smooth and relaxing, the perfect end to a person's day."

Describing his usual recording method as an all-encompassing experience, Callahan notes that the process differed for Dream River: "You sort of dread [recording an album], knowing you have to go into the abyss, because it gets more and more intense, and as the boulder gets bigger and bigger and heavier and heavier, the harder it is to let go. I wanted to see if I could have more of a life, to do other things while I'm making a record. I pretty much did."

== Writing and composition ==
Regarding the album's lyrical content, and the personal nature of Dream River's songs, Callahan noted, "I feel like there's already a written narrative going on everywhere. All the different situations and realities you're in, like words floating by. It's something that I didn't start thinking about until recently, but you can hitch that ride, that narrative that's already been created. You just have to read it and write it down."

== Critical reception ==
Professional ratings
Aggregate scores
Source	Rating
AnyDecentMusic?	7.8/10
Metacritic	84/100
Review scores
Source	Rating
AllMusic	3.5/5 stars
The A.V. Club	A−
The Independent	4/5 stars
Mojo	5/5 stars
NME	8/10
The Observer	4/5 stars
Pitchfork	8.5/10
Q	4/5 stars
Rolling Stone	3.5/5 stars
Spin	8/10

Dream River received widespread critical acclaim upon its release. At Metacritic, which assigns a normalized rating out of 100 to reviews from mainstream critics, the album has received an average score of 84, based on 33 reviews, indicating "universal acclaim". Pitchfork gave the album a "Best New Music" designation, with staff writer Lindsay Zoladz stating: "At its core, this is a record about accepting and even embracing the smallness of human life, and how difficult that can be, given our damnably innate sense of adventure, ambition, and restlessness. [...] For once he’s not wishing he were an eagle or a tempest or a sunset. He is just Bill Callahan, flying his small plane with a co-pilot by his side, and for the moment at least, that is enough." The A.V. Club's Jason Heller wrote: "As a portrayal of Bill Callahan by Bill Callahan, Dream River doesn't chew an inch of scenery; instead it dwells in knowing glances and haunted whispers." In a mostly positive review, AllMusic's Thom Jurek wrote: "With Dream River, fans already know what to expect from the man lyrically, and it can't be argued with qualitatively. When you place those lyrics in the context of something so subtly adventurous musically, the result is both engaging and seductive." Mojo called Dream River Callahan's "most beguiling album yet" in a five-star review and later rated it the best album of the year for 2013.

=== Accolades ===
Publication	Accolade	Year	Rank
Mojo	Top 50 Albums of 2013	2013	1
NME	50 Best Albums of 2013	2013	35
Pitchfork	The Top 50 Albums of 2013	2013	16
Uncut	The Best Albums of 2013	2013	7

== Track listing ==
All tracks are written by Bill Callahan.

No.	Title	Length
1.	"The Sing"	4:32
2.	"Javelin Unlanding"	3:48
3.	"Small Plane"	3:57
4.	"Spring"	5:10
5.	"Ride My Arrow"	5:03
6.	"Summer Painter"	6:30
7.	"Seagull"	5:39
8.	"Winter Road"	5:30
Total length:		40:09

== Personnel ==
Musicians

- Bill Callahan – vocals, guitar
- Matt Kinsey – guitar
- Jamie Zuverza – bass, wurlitzer, organ
- Thor Harris – congas, clave, drum kit

Additional musicians

- Brian Beattie – percussion, upright piano
- Chojo Jacques – fiddle
- Beth Galiger – flute

Recording personnel

- Erik Wofford – recording
- Brian Beattie – mixing
- Brad Bell – mixing assistant
- Roger Siebel – mastering

Artwork

- Paul Ryan – front painting
- Bill Callahan – ink drawings

== Charts ==
Chart (2013)	Peak position
Austrian Albums (Ö3 Austria)	69
Belgian Albums (Ultratop Flanders)	23
Belgian Albums (Ultratop Wallonia)	99
Danish Albums (Hitlisten)	38
Dutch Albums (Album Top 100)	63
French Albums (SNEP)	192
German Albums (Offizielle Top 100)	61
Irish Albums (IRMA)	22
Scottish Albums (OCC)	42
UK Albums (OCC)	44
UK Independent Albums (OCC)	12
US Billboard 200	94
US Americana/Folk Albums (Billboard)	9
US Independent Albums (Billboard)	16
