= Have Fun with God =

Have Fun With God

Remix album by Bill Callahan
- Released: January 21, 2014
- Recorded: 2013
- Genres: Indie folk, dub
- Length: 40:28
- Label: Drag City
- Producers: Erik Wofford, Brian Beattie

Bill Callahan chronology
Dream River (2013)	Have Fun With God (2014)	Shepherd in a Sheepskin Vest (2019)

Have Fun With God is the sixteenth studio album by American folk musician Bill Callahan, released in 2014 by Drag City. The album is a dub-style remixed version of Callahan's previous album, Dream River - the mixing done by studio engineer Brian Beattie, who had also played bass, keyboards and percussion on the original album. Callahan spoke at the time of his love for 1970s dub mixing and music, characterising it as "pensive music and body music" - which he suggested as unappreciated qualities in "this digital age".

== Reception ==
Professional ratings
Aggregate scores
Source	Rating
Metacritic	66/100
Review scores
Source	Rating
AllMusic	3/5 stars
Pitchfork	7.3/10

Have Fun with God received ambivalent reviews from music critics. At Metacritic, which assigns a normalized rating out of 100 to reviews from mainstream critics, the album received an average score of 66 based on 16 reviews, indicating "generally favorable reviews". Pitchfork rated the album 7.3/10, especially praising the fact that the dub mixing of the tracks felt "real-time" - as if it was keeping the song structures intact as originally recorded, but mixing the elements live. Maddy Costa for The Guardian gave it 3/5 stars, praising Callahan for his ability to expose the emotional core of his songs in the sparser mixes. In The Los Angeles Times the album received 3/4 stars highlighting the album's roots in the 1970's Jamaican dub traditions, but recommending it to Callahan fans, rather than the wider public. AllMusic noted that the album's sparse percussion, deep bass and echoed vocals create an atmospheric sound. John Mulvey in Uncut found "charm and wit" in the way the echoes of the mix made Callahan's voice sound god-like, but suggested few would prefer this to the original album. Chad Parkhill for the Quietus found it unlike "dub music in its traditional sense" and felt it "doesn’t make much sense as a standalone album". However Paste Magazine's Steve Labate found it "cosmic, Lynchian", suggesting it took the original material into a new realm.

== Track listing ==
No.	Title	Length
1.	"Thank Dub"	4:27
2.	"Expanding Dub"	3:37
3.	"Small Dub"	4:01
4.	"Call it Dub"	5:15
5.	"Ride My Dub"	5:08
6.	"Summer Dub"	6:27
7.	"Transforming Dub"	5:49
8.	"Highs in the Mid-40's Dub"	5:37
