= Ytilaer =

Studio album by Bill Callahan
- Released: October 14, 2022
- Recorded: December 2021–January 2022
- Studios: Arlyn (Austin, Texas); Estuary (Austin, Texas)
- Length: 62:07
- Label: Drag City

Bill Callahan chronology
Blind Date Party (2021)	Ytilaer (2022)	My Days of 58 (2026)

Singles from Ytilaer
- 1. "Coyotes" Released: September 12, 2022; 2. "Natural Information" Released: September 26, 2022

Ytilaer (stylized as YTI⅃AƎЯ) is a studio album by American musician Bill Callahan, released on October 14, 2022, by Drag City. It is the eighth solo studio album released under Callahan's own name, and his nineteenth overall when including LPs released as Smog.

== Recording ==
The album was recorded by Mark Nevers at Arlyn Studios in Austin, Texas, in January 2022. "Drainface", however, was recorded by Cooper Crain at Estuary Recording in Austin in December 2021. The album was mixed by Mark Nevers at Wire Recording in Austin in April 2022.

== Album title ==
Regarding the album's backwards title, Callahan noted, "a few years ago I was doing some drawing and very casually wrote reality backwards – just like you see on the album – and I thought that could be something someday. It was when I made this record I realised it was the perfect time to use it."

== Critical reception ==
Professional ratings
Aggregate scores
Source	Rating
AnyDecentMusic?	8.1/10
Metacritic	87/100
Review scores
Source	Rating
AllMusic	4.5/5 stars
Financial Times	4/5 stars
The Guardian	4/5 stars
Mojo	5/5 stars
musicOMH	4.5/5 stars
The Observer	4/5 stars
Pitchfork	7.8/10
The Skinny	4/5 stars
Sputnikmusic	4.2/5
Uncut	8/10

Ytilaer has received acclaim from music critics. At Metacritic, which assigns a normalized rating out of 100 to reviews from professional publications, the album received an average score of 87, based on 15 reviews. Aggregator AnyDecentMusic? gave it 8.1 out of 10, based on their assessment of the critical consensus.

Andrew Perry of Mojo gave the album a perfect 5-star rating, deeming it an "outright classic". Concluding her review for AllMusic, Heather Phares claimed that, "Along with delivering the abundance of colors, moods, and first-rate songwriting expected from a Bill Callahan album, Ytilaer is more exciting and engaging than his music has been in some time. This is how an expert singer/songwriter captures the tenor of the moment: with songs of timeless quality." Joshua Pickard of Beats Per Minute wrote, "Ytilaer finds Callahan at his most personally enigmatic, taking inspiration from his own life and filtering those experiences through a prism of modern folktales. He offers us all the most enticing details but manages to keep it wonderfully vague at the same time, a treasure trove of musical obscurantism."

== Track listing ==
All tracks are written by Bill Callahan, except where noted.

Ytilaer track listing
No.	Title	Length
1.	"First Bird"	5:01
2.	"Everyway"	5:32
3.	"Bowevil" (Traditional)	3:59
4.	"Partition"	6:03
5.	"Lily"	5:14
6.	"Naked Souls"	6:26
7.	"Coyotes"	6:27
8.	"Drainface"	4:07
9.	"Natural Information"	5:33
10.	"The Horse"	3:32
11.	"Planets"	6:11
12.	"Last One at the Party"	4:02
Total length:		62:07

== Personnel ==
Musicians

- Bill Callahan – vocals (all tracks), acoustic guitar (all tracks), synth (tracks 2, 6), FX (track 8)
- Emmett Kelly – bass (tracks 1–7, 9, 11, 12), backing vocals (tracks 1, 2, 3), electric bass (track 10)
- Matt Kinsey – electric guitar (tracks 1, 2, 6–12), acoustic guitar (tracks 3, 4, 7), backing vocals (track 3), electric 12-string guitar (track 5)
- Jim White – drums (all tracks), backing vocals (track 3), snare case (track 4)
- Sarah Ann Phillips – Hammond B3 organ (tracks 1, 2, 4, 10), backing vocals (tracks 1, 5, 10), piano (tracks 6–8, 11)
- Carl Smith – contra-alto clarinet (tracks 1, 4, 6, 9, 10)
- Amanda Nevers – keys (track 1)
- Amy Annelle – backing vocals (tracks 6, 9, 10)
- Eve Searls – backing vocals (tracks 6, 9, 10)
- Cooper Crain – synth (track 6)
- Mike St. Clair – trumpet (tracks 6, 9), trombone (track 6)
- Glenn Fukunaga – bass (track 8)
- Brent Fariss – acoustic bass (track 10)
- Connie Lovatt – backing vocals arrangement (track 10)
- Derek Phelps – trumpet (tracks 10, 11)
- Bass Callahan – backing vocals (track 11)
- Hanly Banks Callahan – backing vocals (track 11)

Technical

- JJ Golden – mastering
- Mark Nevers – mixing, engineering
- Cooper Crain – engineering (track 8)
- Drew Potter – mixing assistance
- Joseph Holguin – engineering assistance

Packaging

- Bill Callahan – evolution cartoon, liner notes
- Paul Ryan – painting

== Charts ==
Chart performance for Ytilaer
Chart (2022–2023)	Peak position
Belgian Albums (Ultratop Flanders)	99
German Albums (Offizielle Top 100)	64
Swiss Albums (Schweizer Hitparade)	80
