= Forgotten Foundation =

Studio album by Smog
- Released: May 25, 1992 (CD); January 30, 1996 (LP); 2005 (CD)
- Length: 46:03
- Label: Drag City

Smog chronology
Floating (1991)	Forgotten Foundation (1992)	Julius Caesar (1993)

Forgotten Foundation is the second album by Bill Callahan (also known as Smog), released in 1992 on Drag City. It is the last album that Callahan recorded at home.

Professional ratings
Review scores
Source	Rating
Allmusic	2/5 stars
Pitchfork	6/10 stars

== Track listing ==
All tracks are written by Bill Callahan.

Side One
No.	Title	Length
1.	"Burning Kingdom"	1:13
2.	"Filament"	1:57
3.	"High School Freak"	2:12
4.	"Your Dress"	2:19
5.	"Barometric Pressure"	2:08
6.	"Guitar Innovator"	1:26
7.	"Evil Tyrant"	2:38
8.	"Head of Stone I"	1:54
9.	"Head of Stone II"	2:42
10.	"Long Gray Hair"	1:17
11.	"Kiss Your Lips"	2:08

Side Two
No.	Title	Length
1.	"Bad Ideas for Country Songs I"	1:41
2.	"Bad Ideas for Country Songs II"	0:45
3.	"Dead River"	3:23
4.	"Bad Investment"	2:36
5.	"Brown Bag"	2:32
6.	"Let Me Have That Jar Back"	1:13
7.	"This Insane Cop"	2:44
8.	"97th Street"	2:20
9.	"Do the Bed"	2:23
10.	"I'm Smiling"	2:12
11.	"With a Green Complexion"	2:09
