= Sometimes I Wish We Were an Eagle =

Studio album by Bill Callahan
- Released: April 14, 2009
- Recorded: August and October 2008
- Studios: The Track Studio, Plano, Texas
- Genre: Alternative country
- Length: 48:17
- Label: Drag City
- Producer: "Raven"

Bill Callahan chronology
Woke on a Whaleheart (2007)	Sometimes I Wish We Were an Eagle (2009)	Apocalypse (2011)

Sometimes I Wish We Were an Eagle is the second solo album by American musician Bill Callahan under his own name, released on April 14, 2009, via Drag City.

== Recording ==
Sometimes I Wish We Were an Eagle was recorded by John Congleton and arranged by Brian Beattie. In an interview with Uncut, Callahan described the recording of the album:

I recorded the basic tracks with a band, in August I think. Then gave the tracks to the arranger Brian Beattie to write some string and horn parts while I was on tour in South America and North America. When I got back we put the overdubs on, in an old fashioned way – four or five string players gathered around one microphone. The basic band is a couple fellers who I'd been touring with a bit lately, Jaime Zuverza on fine and pretty guitar – Brian described his playing style as "unmacho" which I thought was great. And Luis Martinez on special drums. The bassist was Bobby Weaver who was a friend of the engineer John Congleton.

== Reception ==
Professional ratings
Aggregate scores
Source	Rating
AnyDecentMusic?	7.3/10
Metacritic	82/100
Review scores
Source	Rating
AllMusic	4/5 stars
The A.V. Club	A−
The Daily Telegraph	5/5 stars
Entertainment Weekly	A
Mojo	5/5 stars
NME	8/10
Pitchfork	8.1/10
Q	3/5 stars
Spin	8/10
Uncut	4/5 stars

Sometimes I Wish We Were an Eagle received very positive reviews from music critics and made several publications' year-end best album lists, notably being named the second best album of 2009 by Mojo magazine.

In 2013, NME listed the album at number 443 on its list of the 500 greatest albums of all time.

== Track listing ==
All tracks are written by Bill Callahan.

No.	Title	Length
1.	"Jim Cain"	4:39
2.	"Eid Ma Clack Shaw"	4:19
3.	"The Wind and the Dove"	4:34
4.	"Rococo Zephyr"	5:42
5.	"Too Many Birds"	5:27
6.	"My Friend"	5:12
7.	"All Thoughts Are Prey to Some Beast"	5:52
8.	"Invocation of Ratiocination"	2:41
9.	"Faith/Void"	9:44

== Personnel ==
Musicians

- Bill Callahan – vocals, classical guitar, acoustic steel guitar, electric guitar, piano, Hammond organ, keyboards
- Brian Beattie – electric guitar, pump organ, electric piano, keyboards, percussion, string and horn arrangement
- Luis Martinez – drums
- Bobby Weaver – bass
- Jaime Zuverza – electric guitar

Recording personnel

- John Congleton – recording
- Roger Siebel – mastering

Artwork

- Bill Callahan – lettering and drawings
- Chris Taylor – front photograph

Additional musicians

- Brian Brown – French horn
- Tamara Cauble – violin
- Douglas Edward – violin
- Becki Howard – violin
- Buffi Jacobs – cello
- Maureen Nilsen – violin
- Deanna Sarkar – soprano vocals
- Heather Test – French horn
- Chris Youmans – cello

== Charts ==
Chart (2009)	Peak position
Belgian Albums (Ultratop Flanders)	90
French Albums (SNEP)	128
Irish Albums (IRMA)	44
Scottish Albums (Official Charts)	87
Swedish Albums (Sverigetopplistan)	58
UK Albums (Official Charts)	89
UK Independent Albums (Official Charts)	2
US Heatseekers Albums (Billboard)	16
US Independent Albums (Billboard)	40
