= Jean-Louis Costes =

French musician, performance artist and actor

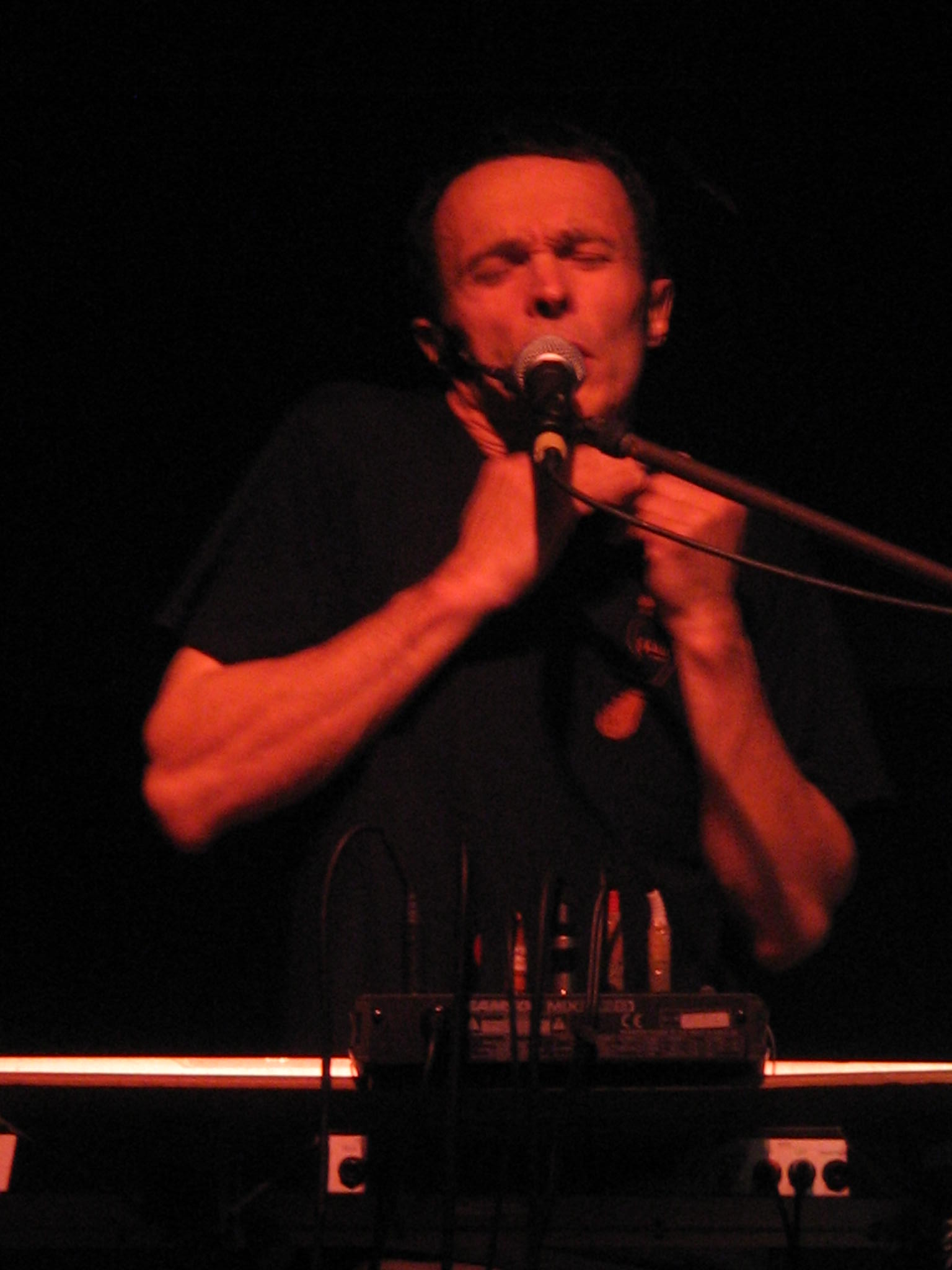
- Costes in 2009
- Born: 13 May 1954 (age 72); Paris, France
- Known for: Radical performer, scatology, film actor
- Notable work: Suckdog
- Movement: Noise music
- Website: www.costes.org

Jean-Louis Costes (born 13 May 1954) is a French noise musician, performance artist, writer and film actor. Costes has been described as the French version of GG Allin, though unlike Allin's rudimentary brand of hardcore punk, Costes' music is largely synth-driven, relying heavily on looped beats, overmodulated vocals, and random outbursts of screaming and glitch fills.

== Career ==
He was once married to Lisa Crystal Carver with whom he performed in Suckdog. He helped write the backing music for the "noise opera" music of the Suckdog Circus. His albums include Hung by the Dick from Nihilist Records.

=== Shows ===
In 2003, he performed a so-called "porno-social opera" entitled the Holy Virgin Cult (Le Culte de la Vierge) across the United States with two other performers credited as "Tristan" and "Nesi".

The performance was approximately 90 minutes long, with three distinct acts and shorter vignettes, and followed a prerecorded soundtrack. Each act began with the performers dressed in elaborate costumes; priests and a nun, a salesman, child and a housewife, ancient templegoers or gods, and ended with all three actors nude and performing simulated and semi-simulated social taboos, scaring audiences with a barrage of apparent flung feces, urine, blood, tortured screaming, public sex and religious symbolism. The performance was written by Costes, reportedly based on his childhood in France.

In 2007, Costes and Lisou Prout completed the "Les Petits Oiseaux Chient" (English: Little Birds Shit) tour across the United States and Canada.

=== Music ===
Costes is considered as one of the first punk-DIY French artists, self-releasing dozens of tapes and CDs from the early 1980s to nowadays. His discography is surprisingly rich and outlandish, melding experimental, spoken word, electronics, sometimes hip-hop or metal, often parodying the French variety-song culture. It consists of more than seventy albums, some recorded in English, German or Japanese.

In 2015, a show played on a grand piano was released as his first live album, Le fantôme d'Archie Shepp (Archie Shepp's ghost). In 2020 he worked with Kommissar Hjuler for the album "Völlig Bescheuerte Musik" (Psych.KG).

=== Writing ===
Costes also published a variety of books, including collections of short stories, novels, comic-strips or photo-novels.

His first novel, Viva la merda!, was published in 2003, by the underground editor Hermaphrodite. In 2006, Grand-père, a semi-fictional biography of his own grandfather (labeled as a "fascist and anti-french racist immigrant", according to the title of the short story published in 2002, which was developed into this novel), was published by the major Fayard editor (which for instance published Michel Houellebecq's fourth novel La possibilité d'une île the year before).

On 1 April 2006, he was a guest at the Saturday evening show Tout le monde en parle (his only appearance on mainstream television), where he read an excerpt of the book (for two minutes straight, in complete silence of the host and the other guests, which itself was an oddity with regards to the usual hectic routine of that show); the show's host Thierry Ardisson expressed how much he was impressed by the writing style, which he likened to that of Louis-Ferdinand Céline.

His next novel, Un bunker en banlieue (A Bunker in the Suburbs), about a violent outburst from a middle-aged man called Jean-Louis, described as an "eternal loser" and waging his personal revenge against the whole world, was refused by Fayard, as well as 23 other publishers, before it was finally published in 2007 by the underground Eretic publishing house.

=== Filmography ===
He appeared in the controversial movies Baise-moi (2000), Irréversible (2002) and Life Pornography (2003). Following the shooting of Irréversible, he published a text entitled "Irrécupérable" ("Irredeemable"), recounting this experience and his disappointment about it, laughing at the fact that even Gaspar Noé, Vincent Cassel or Albert Dupontel (each known for their controversial works) were shocked by his behaviour and genuine underground credentials, or that they were willing to produce filthy movies but unwilling to get anywhere near actual filth or filthy people, labeling Noé as a "stuffed rotten bourgeois controlled by the CNC created by Pétain" and Cassel as a "spoilt brat starlet".

"Yeah, ’cause my career in cinema, it's the guy who gets cornholed (as in Baise-moi by Virginie Despentes) or the guy who masturbates his ass. Costes, the Mister Anal of french cinéma. Well, you see, it sounds lousy, but it's gonna get me some job, since none of those Dupontel-Cassoulet wants to get butt-fucked in front of a camera, so I get the monopoly of 'artistic' onscreen ass!"

== Bibliography ==
- Costes, Jean-Louis (2003). Viva la merda !. Nancy: Éd. Hermaphrodite. ISBN 2-9519565-1-7.
- Costes, Jean-Louis (2006). Grand-père. Paris: Fayard. ISBN 2-213-62553-0.
- Costes, Jean-Louis (2007) Un bunker en banlieue. Eretic.
- Léo Guy-Denarcy (dir.), L'Art brutal de Jean-Louis Costes, éd. exposition radicale, 2012.
