= Cornhole (slang) =

Sexual slang vulgarism for the anus

Cornhole (sometimes corn hole) is a sexual slang vulgarism for the anus. The term came into use in the 1910s in the United States. Its verb form, to cornhole, which came into use in the 1930s, means 'to have anal sex'.

== Connotations and variants ==
The term is apparently derived "from the practice in the days of the outhouse of using dried corn cobs for toilet paper."

By the middle of the 20th century, the term was used among American criminals. According to a 1944 report on male-male prison rape, the term had taken on a more specific meaning of taking the penetrative role in anal sex. It was also popularized in part through use in gay culture.

In a similar context, a corn husk is a "condom", especially one manufactured for anal intercourse.

According to linguist Jonathan Lighter, to cornhole and variant non-derived synonyms have developed as compound verbs: to corncob [1975] and to corndog [1985]. Linguists have noted the verb form as an example of possible compound verbs in English. There is debate whether such words are genuine compounds or pseudo-compounds.

Cornholio, the alter ego of Beavis from Beavis and Butt-head, is a play on the word cornhole, as his catch phrase is “I am the Great Cornholio! I need TP for my bunghole!" The personality of Cornholio, in turn, became inspiration for the cocktail called the "Flaming Cornholio".

== See also ==
- Asshole
- Bunghole
