= The Doctor Came at Dawn =

Studio album by Smog
- Released: September 10, 1996
- Recorded: 1996
- Genres: Lo-fi; slowcore
- Length: 38:52
- Label: Drag City
- Producer: Bill Callahan

Smog chronology
Kicking a Couple Around (1996)	The Doctor Came at Dawn (1996)	Red Apple Falls (1997)

The Doctor Came at Dawn is the fifth album by Bill Callahan (under his "Smog" moniker), released in 1996 on Drag City. It was re-released in Europe in 2001 by Domino. Callahan's occasional creative partner, Cynthia Dall, appears on the album.

== Critical reception ==
Professional ratings
Review scores
Source	Rating
AllMusic	4/5 stars
Robert Christgau	(dud)
The Encyclopedia of Popular Music	4/5 stars
NME	6/10
(The New) Rolling Stone Album Guide	3.5/5 stars
Sputnikmusic	3.5/5

Uncut wrote: "A dark collection of songs, admittedly, but arguably it marked the maturing of Callahan as a songwriter." The Cleveland Scene wrote: "Spare and bitter, its songs conjure closed scenes that hum and bleed with intense sensory details." The New Rolling Stone Album Guide wrote that Smog's "plaintive tunes and self-parodic misogyny both hit new levels." CMJ New Music Monthly called The Doctor Came at Dawn "the bleakest, saddest album of 1996." NME ranked the album at fortieth in their list "Darkest albums ever: 50 of the best."

== Track listing ==
1. "You Moved In" – 4:34
2. "Somewhere in the Night" – 2:10
3. "Lize" – 5:58
4. "Spread Your Bloody Wings" – 3:27
5. "Carmelite Light" – 0:42
6. "Everything You Touch Becomes a Crutch" – 2:34
7. "All Your Women Things" – 6:47
8. "Whistling Teapot (Rag)" – 3:39
9. "Four Hearts in a Can" – 4:12
10. "Hangman Blues" – 4:49
