= Rain on Lens =

Studio album by Smog
- Released: September 17, 2001
- Recorded: May 2001
- Genre: Lo-fi
- Length: 38:25
- Label: Drag City
- Producer: Bill Callahan

Smog chronology
| 'Neath the Puke Tree (2000) | Rain on Lens (2001) | Accumulation: None (2002) |

Rain on Lens is the ninth studio album by Smog. It was released on September 17, 2001, in Europe by Domino Recording Company and a day later in North America by Drag City.

== Critical reception ==
Professional ratings
Aggregate scores
| Source | Rating |
|---|---|
| Metacritic | 73/100 |
Review scores
| Source | Rating |
| AllMusic | 3/5 stars |
| Dotmusic | 4/5 |
| Neumu | 3/10 stars |
| NME | 3/5 stars |
| Pitchfork | 7.5/10 |
| Playlouder | 4.5/5 stars |
| RTÉ | 3/5 stars |

At Metacritic, which assigns a weighted average score out of 100 to reviews from mainstream critics, the album received an average score of 73, based on 14 reviews, indicating "generally favorable reviews.

== Track listing ==
All tracks are written by Bill Callahan.

| No. | Title | Length |
|---|---|---|
| 1. | "Rain on Lens 1" | 1:27 |
| 2. | "Song" | 4:57 |
| 3. | "Natural Decline" | 4:18 |
| 4. | "Keep Some Steady Friends Around" | 4:28 |
| 5. | "Dirty Pants" | 4:31 |
| 6. | "Lazy Rain" | 5:27 |
| 7. | "Short Drive" | 3:27 |
| 8. | "Live as If Someone Is Always Watching You" | 4:05 |
| 9. | "Rain on Lens 2" | 1:31 |
| 10. | "Revanchism" | 4:08 |

== Personnel ==
Credits adapted from liner notes.

- Bill Callahan – vocals, guitar, production, etc.
- Rick Rizzo – guitar
- Geoff Greenberg – bass guitar
- Jessica Billey – violin, backing vocals
- Kyle Bruckmann – English horn, oboe
- Nate Lepine – alto saxophone, flute
- Pat Samson – drums
- Rob Bochnik – recording
- Jeremy Lemos – recording (5, 7)
