= Julius Caesar (album) =

Studio album by Smog
- Released: July 5, 1993
- Recorded: 1993
- Genre: Lo-fi
- Length: 37:01
- Label: Drag City
- Producer: Bill Callahan

Smog chronology
Forgotten Foundation (1992)	Julius Caesar (1993)	Burning Kingdom (1994)

Professional ratings
Review scores
Source	Rating
AllMusic	4/5 stars
NME	8/10
Q	4/5 stars
The Rolling Stone Album Guide	4/5 stars

Julius Caesar is the third album by Bill Callahan (also known as Smog), released in 1993 on Drag City. It was re-released in Europe in 2001 on Domino Records. After his two first LPs, which were recorded at home with an experimental lo-fi approach, Callahan decided to record this album in a professional studio. Nevertheless, he kept control over the recording process, with only Kim Osterwalder helping out on cello.

The song "One Less Star" appeared in Above the Below, a 2003-documentary about a stunt by David Blaine. "Chosen One" was covered live by the Flaming Lips in a record store in Minneapolis on December 12, 1993, a recording which later appeared on their EP Due to High Expectations... the Flaming Lips Are Providing Needles for Your Balloons. The song also appeared (as a Peel Session) on Callahan's rarities compilation Accumulation: None in 2002.

The song "37 Push Ups" appeared in the record company Kill Rock Stars' compilation album, Rock Stars Kill.

== Track listing ==
All tracks are written by Bill Callahan.

No.	Title	Length
1.	"Strawberry Rash"	3:07
2.	"Your Wedding"	2:42
3.	"37 Push Ups"	2:17
4.	"Stalled on the Tracks"	3:24
5.	"One Less Star"	2:59
6.	"Golden"	1:14
7.	"When You Walk"	3:05
8.	"I Am Star Wars!"	2:49
9.	"Connections"	2:10
10.	"When the Power Goes Out"	1:25
11.	"Chosen One"	3:12
12.	"What Kind of Angel"	3:25
13.	"Stick in the Mud"	5:02
