= Knock Knock (Smog album) =

Studio album by Smog
- Released: January 12, 1999
- Genres: Folk rock; lo-fi
- Length: 42:47
- Label: Drag City
- Producer: Jim O'Rourke

Smog chronology
Red Apple Falls (1997)	Knock Knock (1999)	The Manta Rays of Time (2000)

Singles from Knock Knock
- 1. "Held" Released: 1999; 2. "Cold Blooded Old Times" Released: 1999

Knock Knock is the seventh studio album by Bill Callahan, released under his Smog alias. It was released through Drag City in January 1999. In Europe, it was released through Domino Recording Company.

== Background and recording ==
Bill Callahan wrote the majority of the songs on Knock Knock in 1998 while he was driving from South Carolina to Chicago following the dissolution of his relationship with musician Chan Marshall, better known by her stage name Cat Power. He had been living with Marshall in an eight-room farmhouse in Prosperity, South Carolina.

Knock Knock was produced and recorded by Callahan with Jim O'Rourke, though this was originally uncredited on the album. Callahan had previously recorded with O'Rourke on Red Apple Falls. The recording sessions for Knock Knock lasted 10 days and included drummer Thymme Jones, who had played on Red Apple Falls, and drummer Tim Mulvenna of the Vandermark 5, as well as Liam Hayes of Plush on guitar on some songs and avant-garde guitarist Loren Mazzacane Connors. The album also features a string quartet and a small children's choir.

In 2013, Callahan reflected on the album's recording, saying, "It was such an exciting thing just to finally have a band, so different to something like The Doctor Came at Dawn. It's a different energy when you have three or four people playing. Knock Knock was intoxicated with that feeling. I was taking some of the responsibility off my back, and having more fun. I finally had an engineer, Jim O'Rourke, who liked my music, so that encouraged me to go in a more expansive direction – where with the previous records it was all on me and my drunk engineer."

== Release ==
"Held" was the first single from Knock Knock. The original Drag City-release featured the second single "Cold Blooded Old Times" as a b-side.

"Held" is sometimes covered during concerts by American indie rock band Spoon, and their cover appears on their 2022 album Lucifer on the Sofa. The song also appeared in the 60- and 30-second versions of a commercial advertising the 2008 Cadillac Escalade.

== Critical reception ==
Professional ratings
Review scores
Source	Rating
AllMusic	4.5/5 stars
Entertainment Weekly	B+
The Independent	4/5 stars
Mojo	5/5 stars
NME	8/10
Pitchfork	9.7/10 (1999); 8.7/10 (2020)
Rolling Stone	3.5/5 stars
The Rolling Stone Album Guide	4.5/5 stars
Select	4/5
Uncut	3/5 stars

AllMusic gave the album 4.5 out of 5 stars, with the review by Heather Phares calling it "Bill Callahan's subtlest collection of songs yet." She added, "It's a moving album on many levels; not only do the songs have Smog's usual emotional intimacy, their subjects move away from difficult, claustrophobic situations toward maturity and acceptance."

Michele Romero of Entertainment Weekly gave the album a grade of B+, saying, "The energy jolt serves him well, making the delicate broken spirit of his lyrics cathartic rather than depressing."

NME listed it as the 10th best album of 1999. Steve Jelbert of The Independent named it the best pop album of 1999.

== Track listing ==
All tracks are written by Bill Callahan.

No.	Title	Length
1.	"Let's Move to the Country"	3:05
2.	"Held"	4:02
3.	"River Guard"	6:22
4.	"No Dancing"	3:00
5.	"Teenage Spaceship"	3:58
6.	"Cold Blooded Old Times"	4:14
7.	"Sweet Treat"	2:59
8.	"Hit the Ground Running"	6:56
9.	"I Could Drive Forever"	5:15
10.	"Left Only with Love"	2:52

Japanese edition bonus tracks
No.	Title	Length
11.	"Look Now"	3:24
12.	"The Only Mother"	3:29
