= A River Ain't Too Much to Love =

Studio album by Smog
- Released: May 31, 2005
- Recorded: November 2004
- Studios: Pedernales, Spicewood, Texas
- Genres: Indie folk; alternative country; lo-fi
- Length: 50:47
- Labels: Drag City; Domino
- Producer: Bill Callahan

Smog chronology
Supper (2003)	A River Ain't Too Much to Love (2005)	Woke on a Whaleheart (2007)

Singles from A River Ain't Too Much to Love
- 1. "Rock Bottom Riser" Released: 2006

A River Ain't Too Much to Love is the eleventh studio album by Smog, released on May 30, 2005, on Domino Records in Europe and on Drag City in North America. It is Bill Callahan's final studio album released under the Smog moniker. Callahan initially wanted to release the album under his own name, but decided against doing so after pressure from Drag City.

A River Ain't Too Much to Love features guest appearances by Joanna Newsom and Thor Harris of Shearwater. Music videos were produced for both "Rock Bottom Riser" and "I Feel Like the Mother of the World", the latter featuring actress Chloë Sevigny. Both videos can be found on the "Rock Bottom Riser" CD single release.

== Critical reception ==
Professional ratings
Aggregate scores
Source	Rating
Metacritic	76/100
Review scores
Source	Rating
AllMusic	4/5 stars
Cokemachineglow	77/100
Drowned in Sound	8/10
Entertainment Weekly	A−
The Guardian	4/5 stars
Pitchfork	7.7/10
PopMatters	8/10
Q	4/5 stars
Stylus Magazine	A

At Metacritic, which assigns a weighted average score out of 100 to reviews from mainstream critics, the album received an average score of 76, based on 29 reviews, indicating "generally favorable reviews".

== Track listing ==
All tracks are written by Bill Callahan, except where noted.

No.	Title	Length
1.	"Palimpsest"	2:52
2.	"Say Valley Maker"	5:10
3.	"The Well"	7:00
4.	"Rock Bottom Riser"	5:44
5.	"I Feel Like the Mother of the World"	3:09
6.	"In the Pines" (traditional)	5:12
7.	"Drinking at the Dam"	4:07
8.	"Running the Loping"	6:55
9.	"I'm New Here"	3:59
10.	"Let Me See the Colts"	6:39

== Cover versions ==
Callahan's "I'm New Here" is covered on (and used as the album title of) Gil Scott-Heron's final album.

== Personnel ==
Credits adapted from liner notes.

- Bill Callahan – vocals, guitars, various instruments, production
- Connie Lovatt – electric bass, vocals
- Jim White – drums
- Thor Harris – zills (on "Say Valley Maker"), hammer dulcimer and air drum (on "I Feel Like the Mother of the World")
- Joanna Newsom – piano (on "Rock Bottom Riser")
- Travis Weller – fiddle
- Steve Chadie – engineering
- Chris "Frenchie" Smith – mixing (on "I Feel Like the Mother of the World")
- Nick Webb – mastering (at Abbey Road)
