= Supper (album) =

2003 studio album by Smog

Studio album by (Smog)
- Released: March 18, 2003
- Recorded: August–September 2002
- Genre: Lo-fi
- Length: 43:28
- Label: Drag City
- Producer: Bill Callahan

(Smog) chronology
Accumulation: None (2002)	Supper (2003)	A River Ain't Too Much to Love (2005)

Supper is the tenth studio album by Smog. It was released in 2003 in Europe by Domino Recording Company and in North America by Drag City.

== Critical reception ==
Professional ratings
Aggregate scores
Source	Rating
Metacritic	79/100
Review scores
Source	Rating
AllMusic	3.5/5 stars
The Austin Chronicle	4/5 stars
Dotmusic	7/10
Drowned in Sound	5/10
Gaffa	5/6 stars
The Guardian	3/5 stars
Pitchfork	7/10
Stylus	8.4/10
Tiny Mix Tapes	4/5
Uncut	1/5 stars

At Metacritic, which assigns a weighted average score out of 100 to reviews from mainstream critics, the album received an average score of 79, based on 15 reviews, indicating "generally favorable reviews".

No Ripcord placed it at number 39 on the "Top 50 Albums of 2003" list.

== Track listing ==
All tracks are written by Bill Callahan

No.	Title	Length
1.	"Feather by Feather"	5:36
2.	"Butterflies Drowned in Wine"	4:37
3.	"Morality"	2:46
4.	"Ambition"	4:27
5.	"Vessel in Vain"	4:19
6.	"Truth Serum"	7:28
7.	"Our Anniversary"	6:17
8.	"Driving"	4:09
9.	"A Guiding Light"	3:49

== Personnel ==
Credits adapted from liner notes.

- Bill Callahan – vocals, guitar, Hammond organ, piano, production
- Sarabeth Tucek – vocals
- Andy Hopkins – guitar
- Bill Lowman – guitar (8), banjo (8)
- Ken Champion – pedal steel guitar, piano
- Ryan Hembrey – bass guitar, cello
- Nate Lepine – wind controller
- Jim White – drums
- Rian Murphy – drums (3)
- Jeremy Lemos – recording
- Nick Webb – mastering
