= Suckdog =

American underground band

- Genres: Underground music
- Years active: 1988–1998
- Past members: Lisa Crystal Carver; Jean-Louis Costes

Suckdog was an American underground band. The core members were the married couple Lisa Crystal Carver and Jean-Louis Costes. Suckdog toured the continental United States for several years with "Suckdog Circus," performing a mix of wrestling, musical performances, film screenings, and general audience agitation. The heart of the Suckdog Circus were the noise music "operas" written by Costes and Carver which involved strange experimental fantasy stories with much blood and sex.

Other performers in the Suckdog Circus included Dame Darcy, Davey "OHIO" Highben, Coz the Shroom, Nick Zedd and Helen Suckpuppy.

A DVD was released in 2005 by Nut Music entitled Drugs Are Nice: A Suckumentary 1988-2005, containing excerpts of various performances, music videos, short films, and commentary from Lisa Crystal Carver and friends.

== Discography ==
- Pears & Plums (self-released, 1987)
- Rape GG with Costes (Costes Disques, 1988)
- Drugs are Nice (Suckdog, 1989)
- Little Flowers Dying (Suckdog, 1990)
- Onward Suckdog Soldiers (Suckdog, 1998)
