= Bill Callahan (musician) =

American singer-songwriter and guitarist (born 1966)

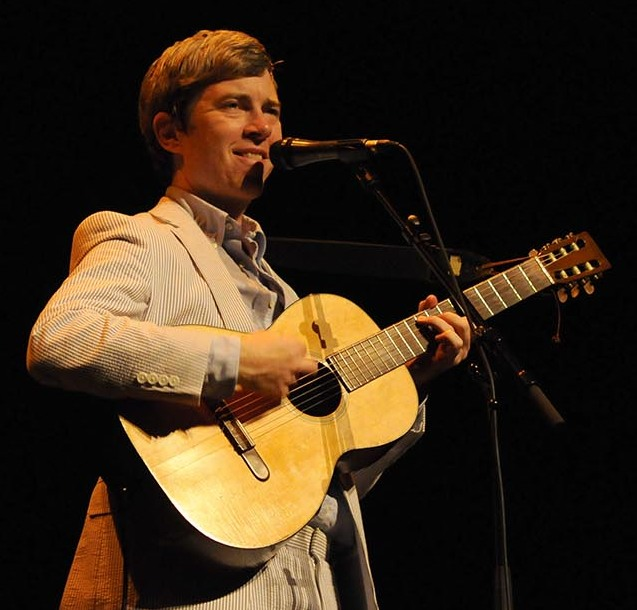
- Callahan performing in 2011

Background information
- Also known as: Smog
- Born: June 3, 1966 (age 60); Silver Spring, Maryland, U.S.
- Genres: Americana; alt-country; lo-fi; indie folk; indie rock
- Occupation: Singer-songwriter
- Instruments: Vocals; guitar; keyboards
- Works: Bill Callahan discography
- Years active: 1988–present
- Labels: Disaster; Drag City; Domino
- Member of: The Sundowners
- Spouse: Margaret 'Hanly' Banks (m. 2014)
- Children: 2

William Rahr Callahan (born June 3, 1966) is an American singer-songwriter, who has also recorded and performed under the band name Smog. Callahan began working in the lo-fi genre, with home-made tape-albums recorded on four-track tape recorders. Later he began releasing albums with the label Drag City, to which he remains signed today.

== Career ==
Callahan started out as a highly experimental artist, using substandard instruments and recording equipment. His early songs lacked melodic structure and were clumsily played on poorly tuned guitars, resulting in the dissonant sounds on his self-released cassettes and debut album Sewn to the Sky. Much of his early output was instrumental, a stark contrast to the lyrical focus of his later work. His use of lo-fi techniques was not primarily an aesthetic preference, but stemmed from his lack of resources to make and record music. Once he signed a contract with Drag City, he started to use recording studios and a greater variety of instruments for his records.

From 1993 to 2000, Callahan's recordings grew more polished, with more instruments, and a higher sound quality. In this period he recorded two albums with the influential producer Jim O'Rourke and Tortoise's John McEntire, and collaborated with Neil Hagerty. Callahan also worked closely with his then-girlfriend Cynthia Dall in his early career, and they contributed vocals to each other's albums. After 2000's Dongs of Sevotion, Callahan began moving back to a slightly simpler instrumentation and recording style, while retaining the more consistent songwriting style he had developed over the years. This shift is apparent in albums such as Rain on Lens, Supper, and A River Ain't Too Much to Love.

Smog's songs are often based on simple, repetitive structures, consisting of a simple chord progression repeated for the duration of the entire song. His singing is characterized by his baritone voice. Melodically and lyrically he tends to eschew the verse-chorus approach favoured by many contemporary songwriters, preferring instead a more free-form approach relying less on melodic and lyrical repetition. Themes in Callahan's lyrics include relationships, animals, relocation, nature, and more recently, politics. On the subject of voice in his albums, Callahan has said, "It's usually one character per record. So, the character appears in all or most of the songs on one record and then is gone. Though it makes me feel weird to talk about. Because I don't really think in clear terms of characters. My albums as a whole could be seen as one character with many voices." His generally dispassionate delivery of lyrics and dark irony often obfuscate complex emotional and lyrical twists and turns. Critics have generally characterized his music as depressing and intensely introverted, with one critic describing it as "a peep-show view into an insular world of alienation."

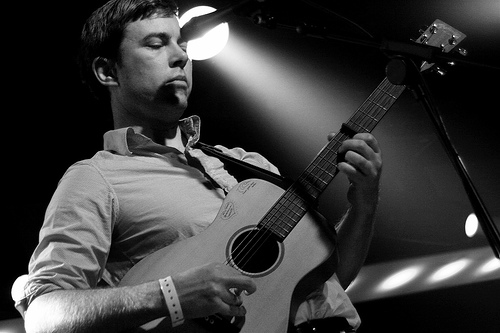
Callahan performing at ATP music festival in 2007

In 2007, Callahan released Woke on a Whaleheart, his first solo album released under his own name. Callahan explained the name change, stating: "I realized that [Smog is] a really ugly word. I realized I'd been going so many years without even thinking about it. I realized I didn't want to be associated with this thing that doesn't even exist. Because a name is a pretty strong thing, right?". He initially planned to release A River Ain't Too Much to Love under his own name but decided against doing so after pressure from Drag City. Sometimes I Wish We Were an Eagle followed in April 2009. Both recordings were released through Drag City, worldwide. In 2009, Callahan contributed cover songs on four separate tribute albums to Judee Sill, Kath Bloom, Chris Knox, and Merge Records. In 2010, he released his first live album Rough Travel for a Rare Thing, which was recorded in 2007 at The Toff in Melbourne, Australia. Apocalypse was released in April 2011 to favorable reviews. Critic Sasha Frere-Jones called it "my favorite of Callahan's albums, not because it has better songs—those are scattered among at least five others – but because it does exactly what he wants it to do: it conveys an album’s coherence." A tour film chronicling Callahan's 2011 Apocalypse tour was released in 2012.

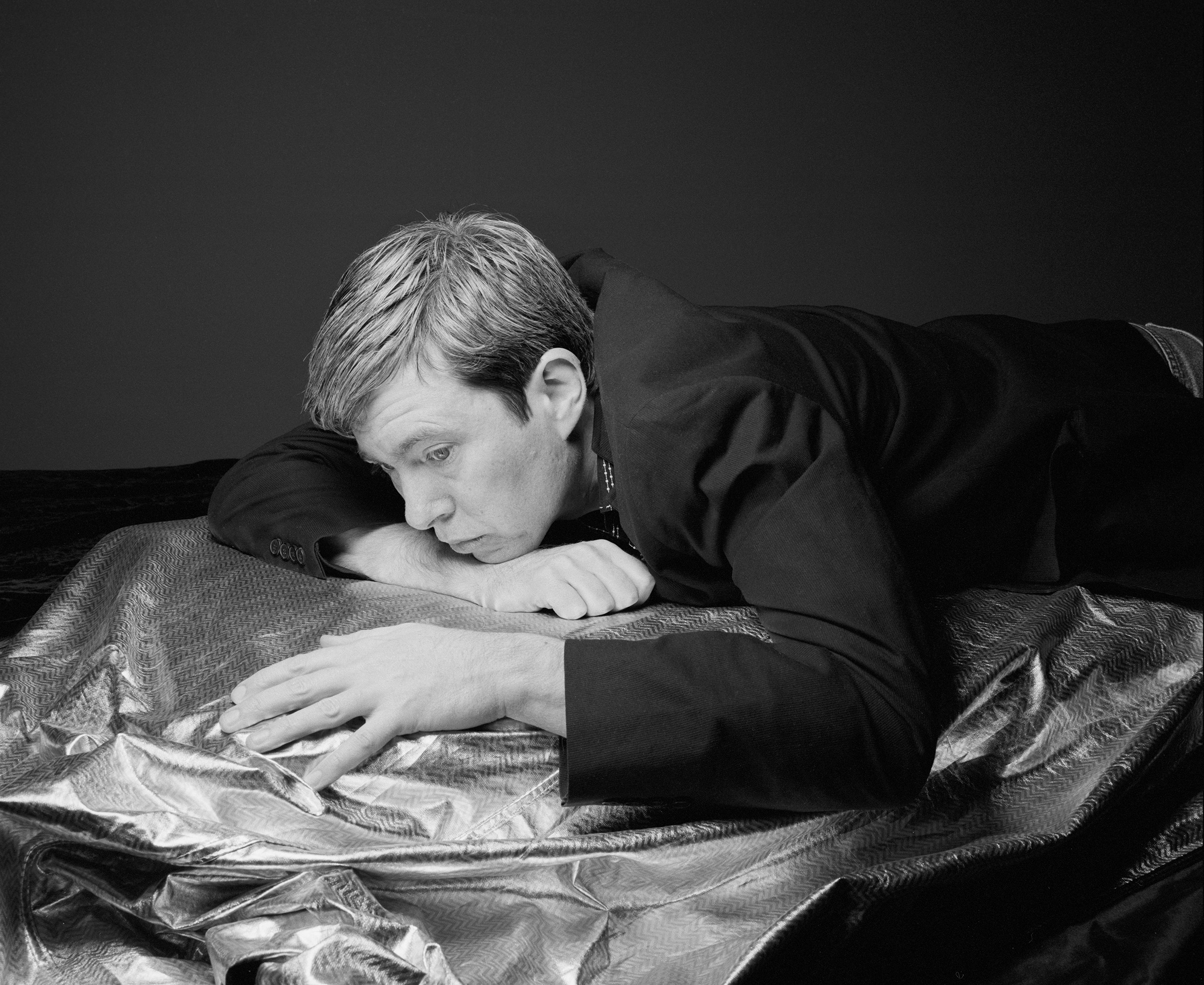
Bill Callahan photographed by Oliver Mark, Berlin 2011

His followup to Apocalypse, Dream River, was released in September 2013. A dub remix of the album entitled Have Fun With God followed in January 2014. In 2018, Callahan was featured in the Live at Third Man Records series. This was his second live album, and features songs from Callahan's previous three studio albums.

Callahan took a hiatus from making music after the birth of his son in 2015 and for a time he considered quitting music altogether, citing the demands of being a parent. His musical hiatus ended with the release of Shepherd in a Sheepskin Vest, on June 14, 2019. It received favourable reviews, with Pitchfork contributing editor Jayson Greene referring to it as a "highlight of his career". His more prolific pace has since returned with the release of Gold Record, in September 2020.

During the COVID-19 pandemic, Callahan and Will Oldham collaborated on a series of cover songs along with several special guests that they released as a series of videos on YouTube. They compiled these songs into the album Blind Date Party that was released in December 2021. Callahan's seventh solo album YTI⅃AƎЯ followed in October 2022. The eighth Bill Callahan album, My Days of 58, was released in February/March 2026.

== Personal life ==
Born in Maryland, Callahan's family spent eight years in Knaresborough in the North Riding of Yorkshire, with a four-year return to Maryland from 1969 to 1973. His parents worked as language analysts for the National Security Agency. He currently lives in Austin, Texas.

From 2004 to 2007, Callahan dated fellow musician Joanna Newsom. He provided guest vocals on her song "Only Skin" from her second studio album Ys.

In 2013, he became engaged to photographer and filmmaker Margaret 'Hanly' Banks; they were married in June 2014. Their son, Bass, was born in March 2015. They also have a daughter born in either 2019 or 2020.

== Books ==
In July 2010 Drag City published Callahan's Letters to Emma Bowlcut, an epistolary novel.

A book of photographs of Callahan by Chris Taylor, titled The Life and Times of William Callahan, was released in January 2013.

In October 2014, a collection of ink drawings by Callahan and lyrics spanning his first album as Smog, to Dream River was released, titled I Drive a Valence.

== Legacy ==
His song "Drover" features prominently in the final episode of the 2018 Netflix documentary series Wild Wild Country, the title of which is drawn from the song's chorus. His song "America" also plays during the credits of Episode 1.

His song “One Fine Morning” is played in episode 8 of Station Eleven.

His cover of Kath Bloom's "The Breeze/My Baby Cries" is featured in the fifth episode of the third series of Sex Education.

In November 2021, British rock band Squid covered Callahan's song, "America!".

== Discography ==
=== As Smog ===
- Sewn to the Sky (1990)
- Forgotten Foundation (1992)
- Julius Caesar (1993)
- Burning Kingdom (1994)
- Wild Love (1995)
- Kicking a Couple Around (1996)
- The Doctor Came at Dawn (1996)
- Red Apple Falls (1997)
- Knock Knock (1999)
- Dongs of Sevotion (2000)
- Rain on Lens (2001)
- Accumulation: None (2002)
- Supper (2003)
- A River Ain't Too Much to Love (2005)

=== As Bill Callahan ===
- Woke on a Whaleheart (2007)
- Sometimes I Wish We Were an Eagle (2009)
- Apocalypse (2011)
- Dream River (2013)
- Have Fun with God (2014)
- Shepherd in a Sheepskin Vest (2019)
- Gold Record (2020)
- Blind Date Party (2021) (with Bonnie "Prince" Billy)
- YTI⅃AƎЯ (2022)
- Resuscitate! (2024)
- My Days of 58 (2026)

== Filmography ==
=== Film ===
Year	Title	Role
1999	Pola X	Musician
2012	Apocalypse: A Bill Callahan Tour Film	Himself
2013	I Used to Be Darker	Composer

=== Television ===
Year	Title	Role	Notes
2017	Animals	Narrator (voice)	Episode: "Worms Birds Possums"
