= The Make-Up discography =

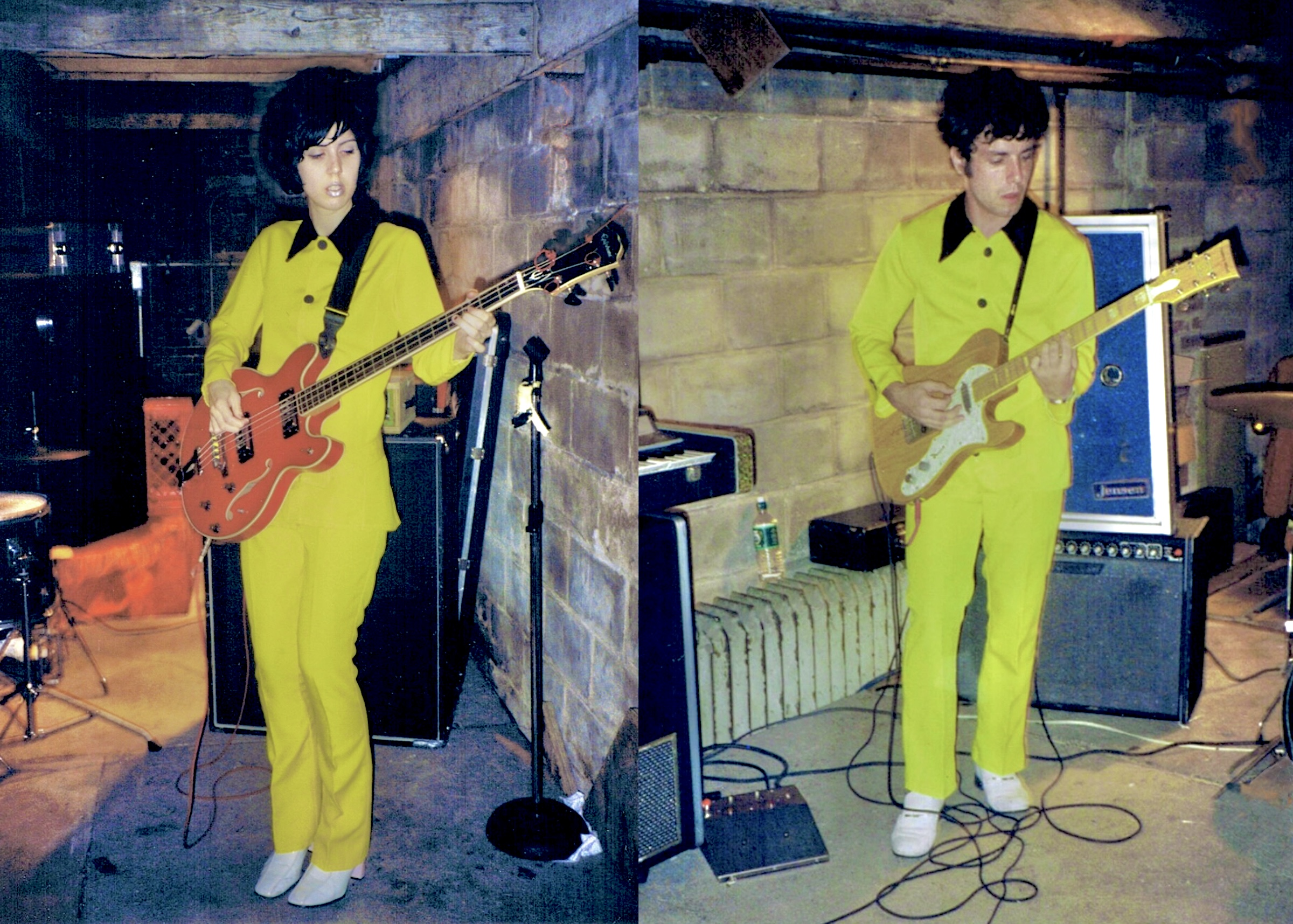
- The Make-Up's Michelle Mae and James Canty wearing one of their many matching uniforms
- Studio albums: 4
- Extended plays: 1
- Live albums: 2
- Compilation albums: 1
- Singles: 8
- Video albums: 2
- Splits: 5
- Compilation appearances: 10

The Make-Up was a Washington, D.C.–based band formed in 1995, consisting of Ian Svenonius, James Canty, Steve Gamboa, Michelle Mae, and for a brief period Alex Minoff. During the Make-Up's five years of activity, they released four studio albums, two live albums, a compilation of singles and B-sides, and a number of singles and splits. A posthumous live album was also released in 2006. The band was also the subject of the short film Blue is Beautiful by James Schneider, later repackaged as part of In Film/On Video in 2006.

The Make-Up released records through many independent record labels, most notable among them were Dischord Records, K Records, Southern Records, and their own Black Gemini Records. On their many releases, the Make-Up recorded with producers including Brendan Canty, Calvin Johnson, Guy Picciotto, Royal Trux ("Adam and Eve"), John Loder, and Ian MacKaye.

== Albums ==
Year	Title	Notes
1996	Destination: Love - Live! At Cold Rice: Label: Dischord Records (Dischord #99); Released: April 29, 1996	Debut studio album.; Though advertised as a live album, Destination: Love was actually recorded in studio and "live" sounds were added to the final mix.
1997	After Dark: Label: Dischord Records (Dischord #105); Released: February 3, 1997	Live album.
1997	Sound Verite: Label: K Records (KLP #64); Released: February 7, 1997	
1998	In Mass Mind: Label: Dischord Records (Dischord #113) and Black Gemini Records (Black Gemini #3); Released: April 7, 1998	
1999	Save Yourself: Label: K Records (KLP #105); Released: October 26, 1999	
2000	I Want Some: Label: K Records (KLP #92); Released: March 23, 1999	Compilation release collecting 23 singles.; All singles included had only previously been released as 7-inch singles, splits, or EPs.
2006	Untouchable Sound: Label: Drag City (DCR #13) and Sea Note Records; Released: February 13, 2006	Posthumous release.; Live album.; Only official release featuring Alex Minoff.

== Vinyl EPs ==
Year	Title
1999	Every Baby Cries the Same" / "Hey! Orpheus: Label: Slowdime Records; Backed with "Grey Motorcycle" and "I am If..."

== 7-inch singles ==
All of the Make-Up's singles and B-sides, with the exception of remixes and versions, were compiled on I Want Some (1999).

Year	Title	Notes
1995	"Blue is Beautiful": Label: Black Gemini Records (Black Gemini #1); Backed with "Type U Blood."	The Make-Up's first release.; Self-released on the Make-Up's own Black Gemini Records.
	"Trans Pleasant Express": Label: Black Gemini Records (Black Gemini #2); Backed with Meta-Matics "Absence of Rhythm."	
	"R U A Believer": Label: K Records (DBN 106); Backed with "Dub Narcotic Disco Plate Version"	
	"We're Having A Baby/This is ... Young Vulgarians": Label: Time Bomb Records (TimeBomb#); Backed with Slant 6"I Love You A Lot/ Rebel, Rebel"	
1996	"Substance Abuse": Label: Time Bomb Records (TimeBomb #38); Backed with "Under The Impression" and "Have U Heard the Tapes?"	Only released in Japan.
1997	"Free Arthur Lee": Label: K Records (KLP #85); Backed with "Tell it Like a Version (Dub Narcotic Sound System remix)."	The song is in reference to the incarceration of Love singer Arthur Lee.
1997	"Untouchable Sound": Label: Woo Me! Records (WooMe #1); Backed with "I Didn't Mean 2 Turn U On."	
1997	"I Want Some": Label: Slowdime Records (US), Giant Claw Records (Giant Claw #19) (Australia); Released: 1997 (US), 1999 (Australia); Backed with "Pow! To the People."	
1998	"Wade in the Water": Label: All City Records; Backed with "Gospel 2000 Super ESP remix)."	Cover version of a traditional African-American spiritual song of the same name.
1998	"U R My Intended": Label: K Records (KLP #86); Backed with "The Choice."	
1999	"Born on the Floor": Label: K Records (KLP #91); Backed with "Little Black Book."	

== Splits ==
Year	Title	Notes
1995	7-inch split with Meta-Matics: Label: Black Gemini Records (Black Gemini #2)	Self-released on the Make-Up's own Black Gemini Records.
1995	7-inch split with Slant 6: Label: Time Bomb Records (TimeBomb #128)	
1995	7-inch split with Dub Narcotic: Label: K Records (KLP #82)	
1998	7-inch split with Lungleg: Label: Southern Records and Vesuvius Records	
1998	7-inch split with The Crainium: Label: Slowdime Records (SD #16)	

== Compilation appearances ==
Year	Title	Track(s)	Label	Other
1998	Selector Dub Narcotic	"Hanging Out in Someone Else's World"	K Records (KLP #82)	
1999	Illuminati	"Rough Riders (Make-Up / Mighty Flashlight Remix)"	Domino/Geographic Records (WIGCD #46)	Collection of remixes of songs from The Pastels' Illumination.
2000	Harpsichord	"Love Calls Yr Name"	S.H.A.D.O. Records (SUBO #15 (CD)/SUBO #11 (LP))	Only released in Italy.
2001	Songs for Cassavetes (DVD and original soundtrack)	Live performance of "Time Machine"	Better Looking Records (BLR #7)	DVD and soundtrack of a 90-min documentary with performances from a number of independent bands.
2005	The Joe Beats Experiment Presents Indie Rock Blues	"Save Yourself / It's All for You (Remix)"	Arbeid Records	Remixes by Joe Beats. Make-Up song ("Save Yourself") mixed with a Scout Niblett song ("It's All for You").
2006	Indie Rock Blues	"Save Yourself / It's All for You (Remix)"	24-7 Records	Repressing of The Joe Beats Experiment Presents Indie Rock Blues.
2007	Smokin' Aces Original Soundtrack	"Save Yourself" (version)	Lakeshore Records	Original soundtrack from the 2007 film Smokin' Aces.

== DVD / video ==
Year	Title
1998	Blue Is Beautiful: Distributed by: Dischord Records (Dischord #114); Directed by James Schneider.; VHS only.; Featured on In Film/On Video.
2006	In Film/On Video: Distributed by: Dischord Records (Dischord #156); Released: November 7, 2006; Includes Blue Is Beautiful by James Schneider.; Compiled by Schneider and Ian Svenonius.

== See also ==
- Nation of Ulysses discography
- Weird War discography
- Dischord Records discography
