= Ian Svenonius =

American musician

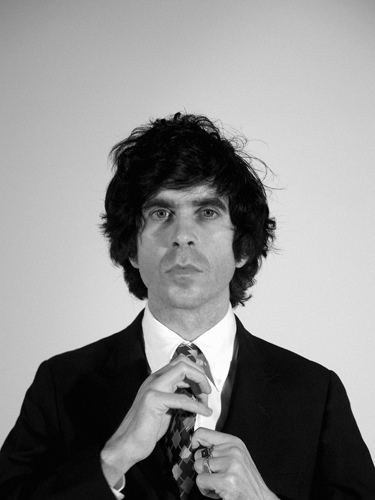

Background information
- Born: Ian Folke Svenonius; June 1, 1968 (age 58); Chicago, Illinois, U.S.
- Genres: Punk rock; art rock; post-punk; indie rock
- Occupation: Musician
- Instruments: Vocals; Trumpet guitar
- Years active: 1980–present
- Labels: Dischord Records; Drag City; K Records; Southern Records

Ian Folke Svenonius is an American author, filmmaker, and musician with various Washington, D.C.–based punk bands including Nation of Ulysses, the Make-Up, Weird War, XYZ, Too Much, Escape-ism, and Chain & the Gang. Between his numerous projects, Svenonius has released more than 22 full-length albums and over 20 singles, EPs, and splits. A published author and online talk show host, Svenonius' projects share a tongue-in-cheek, left political ideology.

His first band, Nation of Ulysses, which released its first record in 1990, was highly influential in the punk scene but dissolved in 1992. After a short-lived side-project called Cupid Car Club, Svenonius formed the Make-Up in 1995, who combined garage rock, soul, and liberation theology to make a new genre they dubbed "Gospel Yeh-Yeh". The Make-Up disbanded early in 2001, and a year later, Svenonius formed the band Weird War, who were also known briefly as the Scene Creamers. Later Svenonius led the band Chain and the Gang. Currently, Svenonius is the leader of the group Escape-ism.

In 2021, Svenonius co-released a feature film called "The Lost Record," named for the Escape-ism LP of the same name.

Svenonius' solo work includes the 2001 album Play Power under the fictional pseudonym of David Candy, the books The Psychic Soviet, Supernatural Strategies for Making a Rock 'n' Roll Group, Censorship Now!!, & Against the Written Word, and as host of Soft Focus on VBS.tv.

== Musical projects ==
=== Nation of Ulysses ===
Svenonius' first musical group was Nation of Ulysses. The band formed in spring 1988, initially composed of four members, Svenonius on vocals and trumpet, Steve Kroner on guitar, Steve Gamboa on bass guitar, and James Canty on drums, and known simply as "Ulysses". In late 1989, Tim Green joined the band as a second guitarist and the band was renamed to "Nation of Ulysses". The Nation of Ulysses described themselves not as a rock and roll group in the traditional sense, but "as a political party" and as "a shout of secession". Explaining their intent, Svenonius said "it's basically a new nation underground for the dispossessed youth colony. It's all about smashing the old edifice, the monolith of rock and roll".

In 1990, before the band released any official albums, Svenonius was featured as teen-oriented Sassy Magazine's first "Sassiest Boy in America". He was interviewed in the magazine's October issue, detailing the band's sound and political motivations. Svenonius stated that the Nation of Ulysses' intent was "to create a space of liberation where anything's possible". He criticized "traditional rock-and-roll" groups as a "corrupt medium". The contest was reportedly a "nationwide search for the most perfect boyfriend material a girl could ask for", and Svenonius was among 150 entries.

Nation of Ulysses was known for their extremely physical performances, during which Svenonius recalls many injuries, including breaking his arm, his leg, and his skull on numerous occasions. Audience members were also hurt during some performances.

The group disbanded in the fall of 1992 having failed to complete their third album (the finished tracks were later released as The Embassy Tapes in 2000). In a later interview, Svenonius explained the reason for the split: "Nation of Ulysses broke up because the epoch changed with the advent of digital music and the Nirvana explosion. We were faced with what's now known as indie rock, a sort of vacuous form. We had to determine our next move and this [the forming of The Make-Up] is it".

=== The Make-Up ===
The Make-Up formed in 1995, consisting of Svenonius, Canty, and Gamboa from Nation of Ulysses, and with the addition of Michelle Mae on bass guitar. The Make-Up were joined in late 1999 by a fifth member, Alex Minoff, who played guitar with the group until their dissolution in 2001. In the band's five years of activity, they released four studio albums, two live albums, a posthumous compilation of singles and B-sides, and a number of 12-inch singles and splits. The Make-Up combined garage rock, soul, and self-styled "liberation theology" to make a new genre they called "Gospel Yeh-Yeh". The Make-Up were highly influenced by bubblegum music, particularly the French variety called Yé-yé music.

As the Make-Up's frontman and mouthpiece, Ian Svenonius often contextualized the band's music in terms of larger socio-political themes, typically describing the band and its gospel attitude in Marxist and socialist terms, in opposition of what he saw as the capitalist, bourgeois, machismo paradigm of rock and roll. The band's aversion to American culture was expressed through their self-styled musical genre "Gospel Yeh-Yeh", a belief system through which they advocated to their audience to "get theirs" and to "off the pigs in all their forms". The Make-Up intended to create ad-lib performances to re-energize what they saw as the stale, bland and formal ritual of rock and roll. Appropriating gospel music's use of the congregation as a "fifth member", the Make-Up incorporated audience participation through call and response vocals, lyrical "discussion" techniques, and destruction of the fourth wall by physical transgression.

The Make-Up dissolved in 2000, reportedly "due to the large number of counter-gang copy groups which had appropriated their look and sound and applied it to a vacuous and counter-revolutionary forms". Between projects, Svenonius released a solo album under the pseudonym David Candy.

=== Weird War ===
After the Make-Up disbanded, Svenonius formed the group Weird War in 2001, joined by Make-Up members Michelle Mae and Alex Minoff. While the current lineup appears on the group's first release I'll Never Forget What's His Name, the group's first full-length, eponymous release featured Neil Hagerty and Jessica Espeleta on guitars, and Steve McCarty on drums.

These collaborators soon left to pursue other projects, and the band briefly changed its name to The Scene Creamers, with Svenonius on vocals, Michelle Mae on bass, Alex Minoff on guitar, and Blake Brunner on drums. In this incarnation, the band released I Suck on that Emotion, through Drag City. After being threatened with a legal suit for the name Scene Creamers by a French graffiti artist collective of the same name, the band reverted to the name Weird War. Since then, as its membership has become static, with the addition of Argentine Sebastian Thomson on drums, its intent has become more cosmic. Weird War claims that they are "the sole answer to the hype-based careerism, empty formalism and vacuity which has infected what was once a genuinely creative underground rock 'n' roll scene".

=== Chain and the Gang ===
Svenonius' musical project, Chain and The Gang, has released the albums Down With Liberty... Up With Chains!, "Music's Not For Everyone", "In Cool Blood" on K Records, as well as the albums "Experimental Music" and "Minimum Rock 'n' Roll" on Radical Elite Records. Some of the musicians featured on these records are Calvin Johnson, Brett Lyman (Bad Thoughts/M'Ladys's Records), Fiona Campbell (Vivian Girls/Coasting), Sarah Pedal, Katie Alice Greer (Priests), Faustine Hudson (The Curious Mystery), Brian Weber (Dub Narcotic Sound System), Veronica Ortuño (Finally Punk/Carrots), Nicolaas Zwart (Desolation Wilderness), Karl Blau, Chris Sutton (Hornet Leg, The Gossip), Sixx (The Vibrarians), Arrington de Dionyso, Aaron Hartman, Benjamin Hartman (Old Time Relijun), Anna Nasty (Olivia Neutron-John), and Francy Graham.

=== Escape-ism ===
Formed as a solo project, Escape-ism encompasses a more lofi-electronic sound compared to Svenonius' band oriented projects. The band has featured Alexandria Cabral and Sandi Denton as live members and contributors. Live shows consist of programmed drum machines, sparse jagged guitars, and stream of consciousness lyrics.

== Other projects ==
Throughout his career, Svenonius has disc jockeyed at clubs such as Cold Rice in Washington, D.C. In 1993 Svenonius and Nation of Ulysses/Make-Up members James Canty and Steve Gamboa were involved in the short-lived project Cupid Car Club, which released only one EP on Kill Rock Stars Records titled Join our Club. In 2001 Svenonius collaborated with the English conceptualist/producer Mike Alway of If.. Records to create the record Play Power under the pseudonym David Candy. The album was released through Jet Set Records, Siesta Records, and If.. Records. Play Power was part of a series of "Magazine-Style Records" which included other imaginary acts such as Death by Chocolate, Maria Napoleon, and Lollipop Train.

Svenonius wrote an afterword for Glen E. Friedman's 2005 photography book Recognize (ISBN 0-9641916-6-0), as well as the introduction to Friedman's 2007 book Keep Your Eyes Open (ISBN 0-9641916-8-7). As host of the VBS.TV online show Soft Focus, Svenonius interviews guests such as Ian MacKaye, Genesis P-Orridge, Adam Horovitz, Cat Power and Will Oldham in front of a live audience at the Guggenheim Museum in New York City. Soft Focus later moved to London, England, where Svenonius interviewed British artists such as Mark E. Smith of The Fall and Billy Childish. In 1994, Svenonius had a supporting role in the independent film Half-Cocked. In 2001, Svenonius appeared in the documentary Plaster Caster about the plaster casts of Cynthia Plaster Caster.

In 2021, Svenonius co-released the feature length film The Lost Record, named for the Escape-ism record of the same title.

=== The Psychic Soviet and other writing ===
In July 2006, Svenonius released a book of 19 essays titled the Psychic Soviet (ISBN 0-9656183-9-0), published by Drag City Press. Pocket-sized and bound in bright-pink plastic with beveled edges, its form is similar to "The Little Red Book", a Bible, or a foreign-language dictionary. The book serves as an anthology of past articles and essays by Svenonius previously published in periodicals, edited for readability and flow, with a number of new essays included.

The "Instructions" that preface the book state that it "should clear up much of the confusion regarding events of the last millennium – artistic, geo-political, philosophical, et al." and encourages the reader to "refer to the book in case of ethical quandaries, arguments, and social feuds". The writing addresses topics such as the ascent of the DJ as a "star", the "cosmic depression" that followed the defeat of the Union of Soviet Socialist Republics in the Cold War, and the status of rock and roll as a religion.

After The Psychic Soviet, Svenonius released the books "Supernatural Strategies for Making a Rock 'n' Roll Group"(2012), "Censorship Now!!" (2015), & "Against the Written Word" (2023). He also publishes a newsprint periodical of essays, art, and poetry called "The Cellophane Flag" through Radical Elite Press.

== Discography ==
=== Nation of Ulysses ===
- 13-Point Program to Destroy America (Dischord) (1991)
- Plays Pretty for Baby (Dischord) (1992)
- The Embassy Tapes (Dischord) (2000)

=== The Make-Up ===
- Destination: Love – Live! At Cold Rice (Dischord) (1996)
- After Dark (Dischord) (1997)
- Sound Verite (K Records) (1997)
- In Mass Mind (Dischord) (1998)
- Save Yourself (K Records) (1999)
- I Want Some (singles compilation) (K Records) (1999)
- Untouchable Sound (Drag City/Sea Note) (2006)

=== Weird War ===
- Weird War (Drag City) (2002)
- I Suck on that Emotion (as Scene Creamers) (Drag City) (2003)
- If You Can't Beat 'Em, Bite 'Em (Drag City) (2004)
- Illuminated by the Light (Drag City) (2005)

=== Chain and The Gang ===
- Down With Liberty... Up With Chains! (K Records) (2009)
- Music's Not For Everyone (K Records) (2011)
- In Cool Blood (K Records) (2012)
- Minimum Rock n Roll (Radical Elite Records) (2014)
- Experimental Music (Radical Elite Records) (2017)
- Best of Crime Rock (In The Red) (2017)

=== David Candy ===
- Play Power (Jet Set/Siesta/If Records) (2001)

=== Cupid Car Club ===
- Join our Club (Kill Rock Stars) (1993)

=== XYZ ===
- S/T (Mono-tone Records) (2014)
- Artificial Flavoring (Mono-Tone Records)(2019)

=== Escape-ism ===
- Tour tape (Flat Black Studios) (2017)
- Introduction to Escape-ism (Merge Records) (2017)
- Iron Curtain (split 7" w/ Light Beams) (Lovitt Records) (2017)
- "Crime Wave Rock" Live at Third Man (Third Man Records) (2018)
- The Lost Record (Merge Records) (2018)
- Bodysnatcher b/w Where Does One Kiss End? (Waaghaals Records) (2019)
- Alphabet Reform 7" (Experimental Jetset Records) (2019)
- The Silent Record (Radical Elite Records) (2021)
- Rated Z (Radical Elite Records / Monotone Records) (2021)
- Charge of the Love Brigade (Radical Elite Records) (2025)

=== Too Much ===
- "Patent Leather" 45 b/w "Dyslexia" (2018)
- Club Emotion (Radical Elite Records) (2020)

== Filmography ==
- Half-Cocked (film) (independent release) (1994)
- Plaster Caster (Xenon Pictures) (2001)
- Soft Focus (VBS.tv) (host, 2007–2010)
- The Seduction of Paolo Hewitt (Ooga Booga) (2008)
- The Launching of the Dream Weapon (Ooga Booga) (2008)
- What is a Group? (Strawberry City Films) (2013)
- Teenage Surrealism (2018)
- The Lost Record (Rated Z Films) (2022)

== Writings ==
- Afterword of Glen E. Friedman's Recognize (ISBN 0-9641916-6-0) (Burning Flags Press) (2005)
- The Psychic Soviet (ISBN 0-9656183-9-0) (Drag City Press) (2006)
- Introduction of Glen E. Friedman's Keep Your Eyes Open – The Fugazi Photographs of Glen E. Friedman (ISBN 0-9641916-8-7) (Burning Flags Press) (2007)
- "Supernatural Strategies for Making a Rock 'n' Roll Group" (ISBN 978-1-61775-130-1)(Akashic Books)(2013)
- "Censorship Now!" (ISBN 1617754099)(Akashic Books)(2015)
- "Against the Written Word" (Akashic Books) (2023)
- "The Autobiography of Ian F Svenonius" [chapbook] (Akashic Books) (2023)
- The Cellophane Flag (Radical Elite Press) (2021)
