= Michelle Mae =

American musician

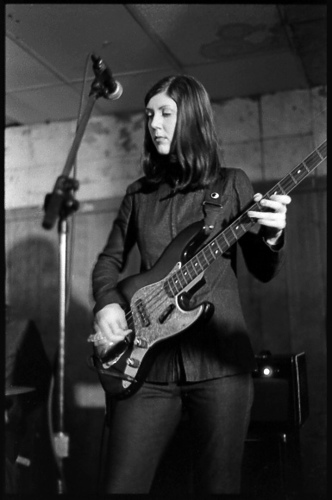

Background information
- Birth name: Michelle Mae
- Origin: Washington, United States
- Genres: Rock 'n' roll, post-punk
- Occupation: Musician
- Instrument(s): Bass guitar, vocals
- Years active: 1990–present
- Labels: Kill Rock Stars, Dischord, K, Southern

Michelle Mae is an American musician from the state of Washington, who is known for playing in rock 'n' roll groups such as The Make-Up and Weird War.

== Biography ==
Mae began playing with underground bands in Olympia, Washington in the mid-1990s, including a single recording with Witchy Poo, and a period with Kill Rock Stars artists The Frumpies before moving to Washington, D.C. to help form The Make-Up in 1995. After The Make-Up dissolved in 2000, Mae joined Weird War with some of her former Make-Up band mates.

Her style is heavily funk inflected, influenced by Funkadelic's Billy "Bass" Nelson, Larry Graham, and The Slits, as well as Northwest stalwarts Dead Moon.

Typically focusing on the bass guitar, in Weird War she plays a Fender Jazz Bass through a Sunn cabinet, though in The Make-Up she often played Hagström and Epiphone guitars through Kustom amplifiers.

Mae is based in Washington, D.C., where she continues to work as a musician and practitioner of mysticism.

== Discography ==
=== Witchy Poo ===
==== 7 inch singles ====
- Mixed Metaphor (Kill Rock Stars/5RC) (released 1995, recorded 1992–1994)

=== The Frumpies ===
==== Albums ====
- Frumpie One Piece (Kill Rock Stars/5RC) (1998)

==== 7 inch singles ====
- Babies & Bunnies (Kill Rock Stars/5RC) (1993)
- Safety First (Wiiija) (1993)

=== The Make-Up ===
==== Studio albums ====
- Destination: Love - Live! At Cold Rice (Dischord) (1996)
- Sound Verite (K Records) (1997)
- In Mass Mind (Dischord) (1998)
- Save Yourself (K Records) (1999)
- I Want Some (singles compilation) (K Records) (1999)

==== Live albums ====
- After Dark (Dischord) (1997)
- Untouchable Sound - Live! (Drag City/Sea Note) (2006)

==== DVD / video ====
- Blue is Beautiful (included on In Film/On Video) (Dischord) (1998)
- In Film/On Video (Dischord) (2006)

=== Weird War ===
==== Studio albums ====
- Weird War (Drag City) (2002)
- I Suck on that Emotion (as Scene Creamers) (Drag City) (2003)
- If You Can't Beat 'Em, Bite 'Em (Drag City) (2004)
- Illuminated by the Light (Drag City) (2005)

==== DVD / video ====
- appears on Burn to Shine 01: Washington DC 01.14.2004 (Trixie) (2005)
