= The Nation of Ulysses discography =

Nation of Ulysses discography
- Studio albums: 3
- Extended plays: 2
- Compilation appearances: 4

Nation of Ulysses was a Washington, D.C.–based band formed in 1988, consisting of Ian Svenonius, James Canty, Steve Gamboa, Steve Kroner, and Tim Green. During the Nation of Ulysses' four years of activity, they released only two full-length albums: 13-Point Program to Destroy America in 1991 and Plays Pretty for Baby in 1992, both released on Dischord Records. After releasing Plays Pretty for Baby, the band began recording a third full-length album, but Steve Kroner separated from the band before recording was completed. The remaining quartet continued to record, but the group eventually dissolved before the record's completion. In 2000, six songs from those sessions, in addition to four new tracks recorded live, were compiled and released posthumously as The Embassy Tapes.

In addition to their three-full-length albums, the Nation of Ulysses released two vinyl EPs. The first, a self-titled EP, was the band's first official release, but went out of print when the three tracks from it were included in 13-Point Program to Destroy America. Three different tracks were released in 1992 under the title The Birth of the Ulysses Aesthetic (the synthesis of speed and transformation). The band were also featured in a number of compilation albums on a variety of record labels.

== Albums ==
| Year | Title | Other |
|---|---|---|
| 1991 | 13-Point Program to Destroy America: Label: Dischord Records (Dischord #57); Released: July 1, 1991 | Debut studio album. |
| 1992 | Plays Pretty for Baby: Label: Dischord Records (Dischord #71); Released: October 6, 1992 | |
| 2000 | The Embassy Tapes: Label: Dischord Records (Dischord #124); Released: October 24, 2000 | Posthumous release.; Collection of six songs recorded in September 1992 and four live performances recorded after. |

== Extended plays ==
| Year | Title | Other |
|---|---|---|
| 1990 | Nation of Ulysses: Label: Dischord Records (Dischord #46½) and K Records | First official release, limited print.; All three tracks also appear on the CD version of 13-Point Program to Destroy America. |
| 1992 | The Birth of the Ulysses Aesthetic (the synthesis of speed and transformation): Label: Dischord Records (Dischord #62); Released: March 1, 1992 | Limited print.; All three tracks also appear on Plays Pretty for Baby. |

== Appearances on compilations ==
| Year | Title | Track(s) | Label | Other |
|---|---|---|---|---|
| 1991 | Kill Rock Stars | "N.O.U. Cooking with Gas" | Kill Rock Stars | |
| 1992 | International Pop Underground Convention | "Shakedown" (live) | K Records | |
| 1993 | Fear of Smell | "Dig the Ulysses Mad Pad Scene" | Vermiform Records | |
| 1993 | Eight Songs for Greg Sage and The Wipers | "Telepathic Love" | Tim Kerr Records | |
| 1994 | The Machines: Simple Machines 7"s (1990–1993) | "Diphtheria" | Simple Machines | |

== See also ==
- The Make-Up discography
- Weird War discography
- Dischord Records discography
