= Plaster Caster =

2001 film by Jessica Everleth

- DVD cover
- Directed by: Jessica Everleth
- Starring: Cynthia Plaster Caster
- Cinematography: Jeff Economy; Ken Heinemann
- Edited by: Brian R. Johnson
- Distributed by: Xenon Pictures
- Release date: 2001
- Country: United States
- Language: English

Plaster Caster is a 2001 documentary film about Cynthia Plaster Caster, the groupie who became famous for making plaster casts of rock stars' penises, including her first one of Jimi Hendrix's penis.

== Synopsis ==
The film explores how Cynthia developed her unique pursuit, follows the ups and downs of casting sessions with a shy guitarist and an extroverted glam rocker, and goes along for the ride as Cynthia prepares for her first gallery show in New York City in 2001.

== Interview subjects ==
- Jello Biafra (Dead Kennedys)
- Eric Burdon (The Animals)
- Pete Shelley (The Buzzcocks)
- Jon Langford (Mekons)
- Wayne Kramer (MC5)
- Paul Barker (Ministry)
- Chris Connelly (The Revolting Cocks)
- Ian Svenonius (The Make-Up, Nation of Ulysses)
- Momus
- Camille Paglia
- Ed Paschke
