= Word on the Street =

Word on the Street or Word on tha Streets may refer to:

== Literature ==
- The Word on the Street (book), a Bible-based book by Rob Lacey
- The Word on the Street (literary festival), an annual Canadian book and magazine festival
- Word on the Street (newspaper), a street newspaper in Baltimore, Maryland
- Word on the Street: Debunking the Myth of "Pure" Standard English, a 1998 book by John McWhorter

== Music ==
=== Albums ===
- Word on tha Streets (Bad Azz album), 1998
- Word on tha Streets (Skatterman & Snug Brim album), 2008
- Word on the Street, by Scene of Irony, 2010
- Word on the Street, by Youngblood Brass Band, 1998
- Word on the Street, a mixtape by Kaze, 2006
- Word on the Street: Harlem Recordings, 1989, by Satan and Adam, 2008

=== Songs ===
- "Word on the Street", by Inspectah Deck from Uncontrolled Substance
- "Word on the Street", by Weird War from Illuminated by the Light

== Other media ==
- Word on the Street, a fictional talk show in the American TV sitcom Martin
- Word on the Street, a game published by Out of the Box Publishing
- Word on the Street, a segment on the children's television show Sesame Street
