= Make-Up (American band) =

American post-punk band

The Make-Up
- Origin: Washington, D.C., United States
- Genres: Post-punk
- Years active: 1995–2000, 2012-2013, 2017, 2019-present
- Labels: Dischord, K, Southern, Drag City, Black Gemini, Au Go Go
- Members: Ian Svenonius; Michelle Mae; James Canty; Mark Cisneros
- Past members: Steve Gamboa; Alex Minoff

The Make-Up is an American post-punk band from Washington, D.C. formed in 1995, consisting of ex-Nation of Ulysses frontman Ian Svenonius on vocals, James Canty on guitar and organ, Steve Gamboa on drums, and Michelle Mae on bass guitar. The Make-Up were joined in late 1999 by a fifth member, Alex Minoff (of the groups Golden and Extra Golden), who played guitar with the group until the band's dissolution in early 2000.

The Make-Up combined garage rock, soul, and a self-styled liberation theology to make a new genre they called "Gospel Yeh-Yeh". This style led to an emphasis on live performances and interaction between the band and their audience, incorporating the audience into the performances as a "fifth member", creating what one reviewer described as ""highly energetic and participatory live shows". Parallel to the band's gospel musical stylings, the Make-Up produced music under a communism-influenced political philosophy that they saw as counter to the capitalist form of modern rock and roll and pop music.

The Make-Up released four studio albums, two live albums, a compilation release collecting several singles and B-sides, a film by filmmaker James June Schneider, and a number of vinyl singles, all released on independent record labels such as Dischord Records, K Records, and Southern Records.

Svenonius, Mae, and Minoff would go on to form Weird War, who released three albums on Drag City. Svenonius has released a solo album under the pseudonym David Candy, as well as records with the groups Chain & the Gang, Felt Letters, and Escape-Ism. Canty would go on to play with Ted Leo and the Pharmacists and French Toast.

The Make-Up reformed in 2012 to perform at All Tomorrow's Parties (music festival), and has continued to tour sporadically in the U.S. and Europe with drummer Mark Cisneros (Des Demonas, Kid Congo Powers and the Pink Monkey Birds) replacing Gamboa.

== History ==
Before the formation of the Make-Up, Svenonius, Canty, and Gamboa were members of The Nation of Ulysses and the short-lived Cupid Car Club. Before joining the Make-Up, Mae played with the Northwest group The Frumpies.

In a post-Nation of Ulysses interview, Svenonius explained the formation of the Make-Up: "Nation of Ulysses broke up because the epoch changed with the advent of digital music and the Nirvana explosion. We were faced with what's now known as indie rock, a sort of vacuous form. We had to determine our next move and this [the forming of Make-Up] is it".

The Make-Up released records through many independent record labels, most notably Dischord Records, K Records, Southern Records, and their own Black Gemini Records.

In 2000, after releasing their fifth studio album, the Make-Up dissolved, reportedly "due to the large number of counter-gang copy groups which had appropriated their look and sound and applied it to vacuous and counter-revolutionary forms". Svenonius also added in retrospect, "[The Make-Up] went on for five years. We had a five year plan like Stalin. It was becoming redundant and people were copying us. That's fine. We don't have to do it anymore because they can".

== Recordings ==
During the Make-Up's five years of activity, they released four studio albums, a live album, a compilation of singles and B-sides, and a number of singles and splits. A posthumous live album was also released in 2006. The band was also the subject of the short film Blue is Beautiful by James Schneider, later repackaged as part of In Film/On Video in 2006.

While the Make-Up released both "live" and "studio" records, their recordings were all created with an eye to spontaneity. Most studio songs were cut as they occurred to the group at that moment. Therefore, the Make-Up's studio records were in a sense, quite "live".

The Make-Up's first release in 1995 was "Blue is Beautiful", a 7-inch single released on the band's own Black Gemini Records–a label which only released a handful of the Make-Up's releases, many of which used a characteristically simple single-color album sleeve. Their second and third releases were also 7-inch singles: a split with the Meta-Matics, again on Black Gemini, and another split with Slant 6 on Time Bomb Records.

The band's first full-length studio album, Destination: Love - Live! At Cold Rice, was released in 1996. The album was touted as a live release, though it was actually recorded in a studio with "live" sounds added into the mix later. In 1997, the band released two more albums less than a month apart: After Dark, a live-recording from London, and Sound Verite, a studio album. The two albums shared a number of tracks, recorded either live or in-studio. The same year the Make-Up released "Free Arthur Lee," a 7-inch single promoting the release from jail of Love singer Arthur Lee, who was incarcerated in 1996. Also in 1997, the Make-Up were the subject of James Schneider's fictionalized tour-documentary Blue is Beautiful.

The following year, The Make-Up released their fourth studio album, In Mass Mind, as well as a split 7-inch with Scottish band Lungleg. In 1999, the Make-Up released I Want Some, a compilation album of previous singles and B-sides. A month later, the band released what would be their fifth and final studio album Save Yourself.

A posthumous live album, Untouchable Sound, was released in 2006 by Drag City and Sea Note. The album included the addition of Alex Minoff on guitar.

== Politics ==
As the Make-Up's frontman and mouthpiece, Ian Svenonius often contextualized the band's music in terms of larger socio-political themes. Svenonius typically described the band and its gospel attitude in Marxist and socialist terms, in opposition of what he saw as the capitalist, bourgeois, machismo paradigm of rock and roll. This political position was typically presented during live performances and interviews with Svenonius, rather than in the music itself or its lyrics. Svenonius compared the Make-Up's ideology to the Situationist International group of the 1950s and 1960s, since both presented a critique of the modern, capitalist lifestyle, specifically of capitalism's effect on popular and consumable culture, such as rock and roll and pop music. When asked if, in line with the title of The Nation of Ulysses' 1991 album 13-Point Program to Destroy America, he still hoped to "destroy America", Svenonius responded simply: "Of course". This aversion to American culture was crystallized through their self-style musical genre "Gospel Yeh-Yeh," a belief system through which they advocated to their audience to "get theirs" and to "off the pigs in all their forms".

The Make-Up's aversion to capitalist American culture was echoed in the 1998 short film Blue is Beautiful, by filmmaker James June Schneider, in which the band starred. The film follows the band's fictionalized escape from America as "cultural refugees", where they are hunted by mysterious government agencies and find refuge in coffeehouses and underground night clubs. Much like the assumed personae and personalities of all of Svenonius' bands and projects, a make-believe mythos and back-story surrounds the Make-Up, primarily based on the band's gospel approach and its pseudo-political, socialist aesthetics. The political identity of the Make-Up was ideologically and semantically similar to Svenonius' other bands and projects, all of which culminate in his collection of essays, The Psychic Soviet, published through Drag City Press in 2006.

== Musical ideology and style ==
The Make-Up intended to create ad-lib performances in order to re-energize what they saw as the stale, bland, and formal ritual of rock and roll. Appropriating gospel music's use of the congregate as a "fifth member", the Make-Up incorporated audience participation through call and response vocals, lyrical "discussion" techniques, and destruction of the fourth wall by physical transgression.

Discussing the appropriation of the form of gospel music (as opposed to its content), Svenonius said:

Our music is gospel-based. It's rhythm-based, with a subverted guitar. And that's because the guitar exists at the same tone as the voice. It's the same frequency as the voice. We don't want those things to compete. We want to make a gospel, oratorical, sermon-based, ad-libbed form of music.

Gospel music seems the most immediate, the most passionate and bendable form. We want to revitalize rock'n'roll and make it a communicative thing, rather than an alienating theme; the rise of dance music seems to be because rock bands seem to be increasingly dropping the ball in terms of making their music relevant to anyone but themselves.

One concern of the group was to keep their music "stripped down" and minimal. This was indicative of the Make-Up's aversion to letting communication be upstaged by technology. Svenonius explained that "the problem is that the high creatures are the server mechanisms of the technology and the system they have created, meaning that we're dictated to as much by cars. We've turned the world into a parking lot. Similarly we use musical technology that we create, and it finds a use for itself".

Due to the Make-Up's consideration of the audience and the special techniques they applied to performing, their live shows exhibited a convergence of soul, surf, and punk – an example of which is their single "I Want Some" from their 1999 album of the same name. Citing the Make-Up's soul influences, one reviewer stated "If you didn't know it, you'd swear that the four members of The Make Up had stolen the soul from James Brown himself". The Make-Up were also highly influenced by bubblegum music, particularly the French variety called Yé-yé. The factory style of production Yé-yé music had utilized interested the group, who were interested in expanding the labor force involved in the production of pop music, a movement which they saw as in opposition to the rock and roll trend (begun by The Beatles) toward self-sufficiency and "downsizing" labor. Through the synthesis of these two disparate and contradictory forms – gospel and Yé-yé – the Make-Up devised a hybrid style they called "Gospel Yeh-Yeh".

== Live performances ==
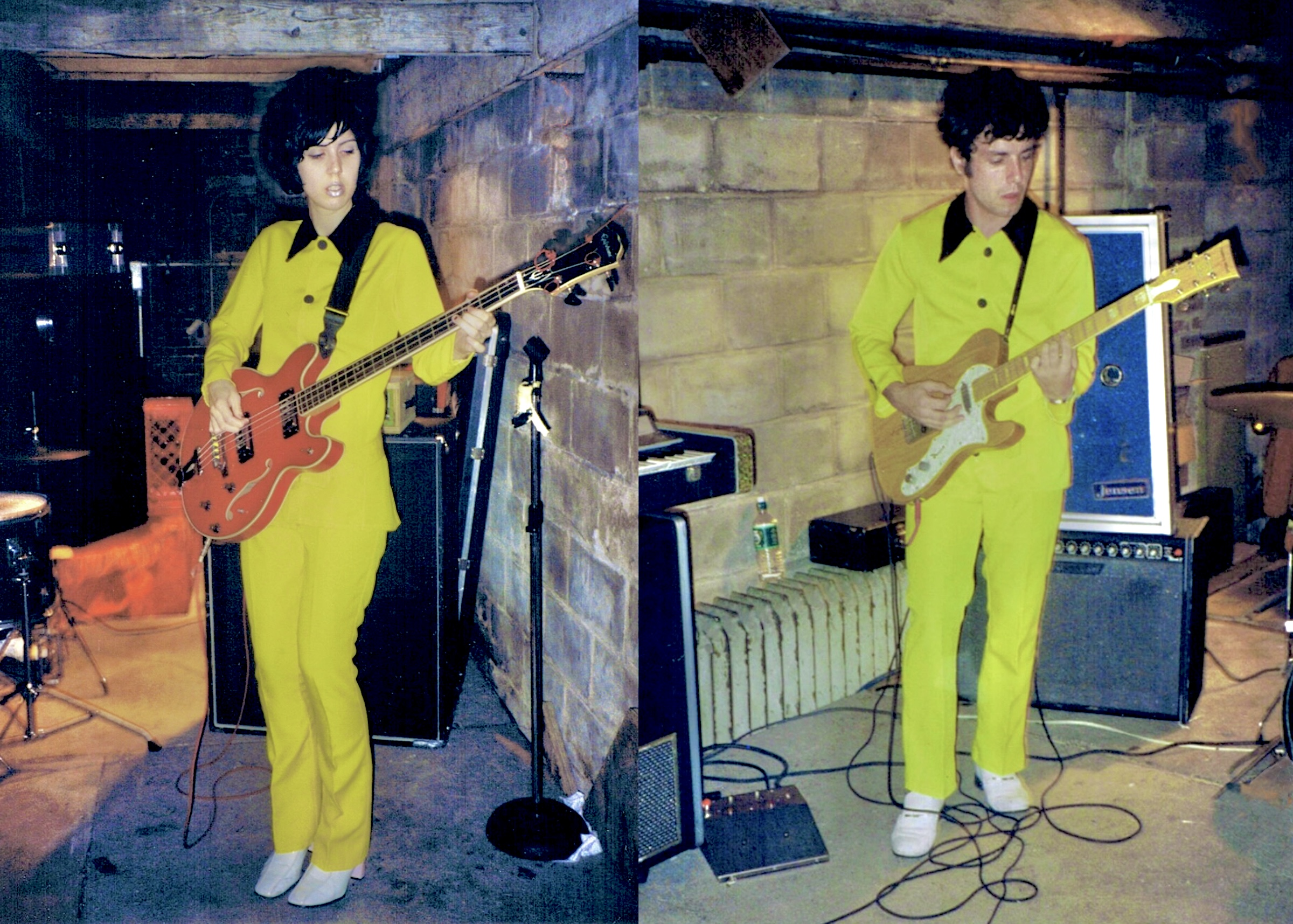
Michelle Mae and James Canty wearing one of the Make-Up's many matching uniforms.

The Make-Up's gospel attitude was related to utilization of the audience as a group member, which Svenonius likened to the rise of the 90s dance music scene: "We're not interested in countering it. It makes sense to me that techno, rave and dance music should go over in the face of rock and roll because it's democratic for everybody to express themselves. Whereas a lot of rock and roll isn't even entertaining at all, let alone allowing people the voice for expression. That's what the Make-Up has come to remedy. We want to be at once entertaining and inclusive in terms of using the gospel form to sort of breathe life into the old Frankenstein monster". Svenonius would often interact with the audience in a number of ways, including call and response lyrics, direct address, and leaving the stage and going out into the crowd.

Despite the band's "gospel" and "ad-libbed" approach to recording, the Make-Up's live performances were often quite structured, as opposed to the typical "jam session". Svenonius explained that "there's a skeleton that we create and the form of our shows is unchanging - there's an intro, an outro, a middle break. It's very vaudevillian in form". The Make-Up always wore matching uniforms on stage. Like most of the Make-Up's identity, the uniforms were an ideological statement, meant to "[destroy] individualism. Instead of there being this person [or] this member, and them having their separate personalities, or having them as separate entities. We're trying to create a unification. A one-ness. That's basically what it is: they're uniforms".

== Discography ==
=== Studio albums ===
- Destination: Love - Live! at Cold Rice (Dischord) (1996)
- Sound Verite (K Records) (1997)
- In Mass Mind (Dischord) (1998)
- Save Yourself (K Records) (1999)

=== Compilations ===
- I Want Some (singles compilation) (K Records - 1999, M'lady's Records - re-issued 2012)

=== Live albums ===
- After Dark (Dischord) (1997)
- Untouchable Sound (Drag City/Sea Note) (2006)

=== DVD/video ===
- Blue is Beautiful (included on In Film/On Video) (Dischord) (1998)
- In Film/On Video (Dischord) (2006)

== See also ==
- Category:Make-Up (American band) albums
- Category:Make-Up (American band) members
