= Alex Minoff =

American musician from Pennsylvania

Alex Minoff is an American musician from Pennsylvania who is known for his work with the groups Golden, and Extra Golden.

Though coming from an independent (or "underground") rock 'n' roll tradition, Minoff plays Kenyan Benga music in Extra Golden, which also includes a drummer and singer-guitarist from Kenya.

He is typically a guitarist/singer but is also credited as playing drums on the Weird War record If You Can't Beat 'Em, Bite 'Em.

Minof also played as a session man and/or collaborator with other previously established groups, such as The Make-Up (on their lp/cd Untouchable Sound - Live!), Ted Leo, Royal Trux, and Six Finger Satellite. He also is featured in a group called Mistle-Tones who compose holiday music.

Minoff often plays a Gibson Firebird guitar.

== Discography ==
=== Golden ===
- Here comes the Golden Fuzz (Slowdime) (1997)
- Super GOLDEN Original Movement (Slowdime) (1999)
- Golden Summer (Slowdime) (2000)
- Apollo Stars (National) (2002)

=== The Make-Up ===
- Untouchable Sound - Live! (Drag City/Sea Note) (2006)

=== Weird War ===
==== Studio albums ====
- Weird War (Drag City) (2002)
- I Suck on that Emotion (as Scene Creamers) (Drag City) (2003)
- If You Can't Beat 'Em, Bite 'Em (Drag City) (2004)
- Illuminated by the Light (Drag City) (2005)

==== DVD / Video ====
- appears on Burn to Shine 01: Washington DC 01.14.2004 (Trixie) (2005)

=== Extra Golden ===
- Ok-Oyot System (Thrill Jockey) (2006)
- Hera Ma Nono (Thrill Jockey) (2007)
- Thank You Very Quickly (Thrill Jockey) (2009)
