= Golden (band) =

American rock band

Golden is an American rock band formed in 1993 on April 7 in Oberlin, Ohio. Since Golden's members are also involved with other, more well-known bands, Golden is often considered more of a side project than a full-fledged band in its own right.

Golden's sound is an amalgamation of many rock styles, but also includes rhythms and influences of many styles from around the world (likely due to guitarist Ian Eagleson working as an ethnomusicologist).

== Members ==
- Ian Eagleson - guitar, vocals (member of Extra Golden)
- Alex Minoff - guitar, vocal (member of Weird War, Extra Golden, The Make-Up and Six Finger Satellite)
- Jon Theodore - drums (ex-member of The Mars Volta and Royal Trux, currently a member of Queens of the Stone Age)
- Phillip Manley - bass (member of Trans Am and The Fucking Champs)

== Discography ==
=== Albums ===
- Here comes the Golden Fuzz (Slowdime, 1997)
- Golden (Trans Solar, 1998)
- Super GOLDEN Original Movement (Slowdime, 1999)
- Golden Summer (Slowdime, 2000)
- Apollo Stars (National Record Label, 2002)

=== Singles & EPs ===
- "Gone To Return / Shack" (7") (Proteen Records, 1993)
- "Chet's Jalopy" (7") (Proteen Records, 1995)
- "Victory Is Ours!/Lance A." (7") (Happy Go Lucky, 1995)
- "Violator/Deep Skills" (7") (The Bedtime Record, 1999)
- "Golden And Rhythm Beat Jazz" (12") (Slowdime, 1999)

=== Compilations ===
- "Oldies" (Bandcamp, 2015)
