= David Candy =

Pseudonym of Ian Svenonius

David Candy is a pseudonym of Ian Svenonius (formerly of Nation of Ulysses, The Make-Up, and currently Weird War). Only one album was released under the name David Candy, Play Power. The character of David Candy was part of a series of "Magazine-Style Records" conceived by Mike Alway (produced by Jez Butler and John Austin), which included other imaginary acts such as Death by Chocolate, Maria Napoleon, Mild Euphoria and Lollipop Train.

The David Candy persona is that of a pretentious, over-opinionated, egotistical, self-absorbed, pseudo-intellectual hipster who has perhaps spent too long alone, absorbed in The Doors' American Prayer. This choice of character traits may have been a form of self-mockery by Svenonius, or perhaps a commentary on the personalities of the indie rock scene in general. Much like the assumed personas and personalities of all of Svenonius' bands and projects (see the "biographies" of Nation of Ulysses, Cupid Car Club, The Make-Up, and Weird War), a make-believe mythos surrounds the character of David Candy.

== Play Power ==
Play Power

Studio album by David Candy
- Released: June 12, 2001
- Labels: Jet Set Records; Siesta Records; If Records
- Producers: Jez Butler and John Austin

Play Power is the only album from the fictional musician David Candy, aka Ian Svenonius.

Three of the tracks, "Listen to the Music," "Bad Bad Boy," and "Lullaby From 'Rosemary's Baby'" are cover versions from obscure film soundtracks. "Listen to the Music" is from the 1968 teen comedy-satire Wild in the Streets, "Bad Bad Boy" is a cover from the 1967 British film Privilege, and "Lullaby from 'Rosemary's Baby' " is a cover from Roman Polanski's Rosemary's Baby.

The instrumentals on the album are reminiscent of 60's pop and psychedelic music, while Svenonius/Candy's vocal delivery is primarily spoken word in the same vein as Beat poetry. The lyrical content of the vocals is often a pseudo-intellectual rant, meandering between overly-heady topics such as historical materialism, Suprematism, and the "rampant public licentiousness" of São Paulo, Brazil. The album was written and performed by Ian Svenonius, Jez Butler, John Austin and Matt Hulse.

== Track listing ==
1. "Playpower (David Candy Theme)"
2. "Incomprehensibly Yours"
3. "Listen to the Music"
4. "Redfuchsiatamborine&gravel"
5. "Bad Bad Boy"
6. "Diary of a Genius"
7. "Lullaby From 'Rosmary's Baby' "
