= Minoff =

Minoff is a surname. Notable people with the surname include:

- Alex Minoff, American musician
- Marvin Minoff (1931–2009), American film and television producer
