= Cupid Car Club =

American post-hardcore band

Background information
- Genres: Post-hardcore
- Years active: 1993
- Label: Kill Rock Stars
- Past members: Ian Svenonius; James Canty; Steve Gamboa; Kim Thompson

Cupid Car Club, also known as Cupid Car Club M.P., was a short-lived American post-hardcore band consisting of Ian Svenonius on vocals, James Canty on drums, Steve Gamboa on guitar (all of which were previously members of Nation of Ulysses and later went on to form The Make-Up), and Kim Thompson (of The Delta 72) on bass and vocals.

They released one 7-inch EP on Kill Rock Stars, called Join our Club. Cupid Car Club also appeared on the Rock Stars Kill and Some Songs compilations, also under the Kill Rock Stars label.

The band's lyrical content, album art, and promotional material tended to stray towards a morbid playfulness, containing many references to topics such as suicide, child custody, and cults.

== Join our Club ==
Join our Club

EP by Cupid Car Club
- Released: 1993
- Recorded: Pirate House
- Label: Kill Rock Stars
- Producers: Brendan Canty; Guy Picciotto

Join our Club, sometimes known as Werewolves!, was the only EP from the short-lived band Cupid Car Club.

The track "Grape Juice Plus" borrows its name from the term used by Dr. Lewis Dickson to describe wine to Zira in Escape from the Planet of the Apes. Also, the lyrics "Did you have the dream now about the boy" and "Don't you got it good now so I can shoot my little girl" are direct references to the 1991 film, The Rapture. Svenonius has a penchant for obscure film references and name-dropping (most obvious in David Candy's Play Power).

=== Track listing ===
1. "Edge of the Envelope" − 2:10
2. "Vapor Rub-Out"
3. "Child Custody Commandos"
4. "Grape Juice Plus" − 3:49

== Other appearances on compilations ==
Year	Title	Track(s)	Label	Other
1994	Rock Stars Kill	"M.P. Skulkers"	Kill Rock Stars	Consists of a CD, LP, and a 7 inch. "M.P. Skulkers" appears only on CD and LP pressings. "M.P. Skulkers" does not appear on any other release, including Join our Club.
1997	Some Songs	"Grape Juice Plus"	Kill Rock Stars	
