= In Film/On Video =

- Original movie poster
- Directed by: James Schneider
- Starring: Ian Svenonius; Michelle Mae; Steve Gamboa; James Canty
- Edited by: James Schneider; Ian Svenonius
- Music by: The Make-Up
- Distributed by: Dischord Records
- Release date: November 7, 2006 (U.S.)
- Running time: 96 minutes
- Language: English

In Film/On Video is a collection of video and film of Washington, D.C., rock band The Make-Up released in 2006 by Dischord Records. Included on the DVD:

- Blue is Beautiful

33 minute film by James Schneider, shot in 16 mm film, with optional audio commentary by Make-Up front man Ian Svenonius.

- Music videos: "Save Yourself," "White Belts," "Call Me Mommy," and "Little Black Book"

Previously unreleased video version of "Save Yourself" and three instrumental demos. The footage consists primarily of 16 mm outtakes from Blue is Beautiful and other footage taken of the group by other filmmakers.

- Live performances

43 minutes of live footage from the Wilson Center in Washington, D.C., and The Troubadour in West Hollywood, California.

- Spex feature

7 minute "intercept" from German TV, featuring an introduction by the band and a montage of live performances.

The Blue is Beautiful one sheet:

Blue Is Beautiful is the 30 plus minute guerrilla style documentary concerning the psychedelic Gospel group 'Make-up' and its attempts to win political asylum in the unexplored hinterland to the north. En route, the moving picture portrays their treacherous mechanical march across the post-industrial wasteland of the so-called rust belt, through a horrifying commercial Christmas barrage and into the arms of the American underground. The music falls away at times, and a skeletal sermon narrates the desperation of a group which COINTELPRO advised American law enforcement officials nationwide to "terminate with extreme prejudice". The manhunt flails through wildcat clubs in Detroit-Cincinnati-New York-Boston-Toronto-D.C. and Montreal. Schneider shows the mandibles of the beast and its attempts to alienate the group from its tribe.
