= Interstate (disambiguation) =

An interstate is a type of high-speed, limited-access highway in the United States, part of the Interstate Highway System.

Interstate may also refer to:

== Media ==
- Interstate 60 (2002), a metaphysical comedy/drama road film
- Interstate (album), a 1995 album by Pell Mell
- "Interstate" (song), a song from the album Tear the Signs Down (2010) by The Automatic
- Interstate '76, a vehicular-combat video game for the Microsoft Windows computer-operating system
- Interstate '82, the sequel to Interstate '76

== Transportation ==
- United States Numbered Highway System, also called the first interstate highway system in the United States
- New England Interstate Routes, one of the regional precursors of the Interstate Highway System in the United States

== Other uses ==
- Interstate (baseball), a batting average below .200
- Interstate (duo), an American-based musical duo
- Interstate (typeface), a humanist sans-serif typeface designed by Tobias Frere-Jones
- Interstate Aircraft, a former American company
- Interstate Bakeries Corporation
- Interstate Batteries, an American company that markets automotive batteries
- Interstate commerce, see Commerce Clause, an enumerated power listed in the United States Constitution (Article I, Section 8, Clause 3)
- Interstate compact, a pact or treaty among various states of the United States, or between states and any foreign government
- Interstate system (world-systems theory), a theory of state relationships within world-systems theory
- Interactions between two or more nations, commonly called 'international'
- Events, transactions, travel, interactions, etc. between or amongst two or more subnational states or provinces in a federation
