= Save Yourself (The Make-Up album) =

Studio album by The Make-Up
- Released: October 26, 1999
- Studio: Pirate Studios, Washington, D.C.
- Genre: Post-punk, funk
- Length: 35:47
- Label: K Records
- Producer: Brendan Canty

The Make-Up chronology
In Mass Mind (1998)	Save Yourself (1999)	I Want Some (1999)

Professional ratings
Review scores
Source	Rating
AllMusic	4.5/5 stars
The Great Indie Discography	7/10
Laut.de	4/5 stars
NME	4/5 stars
Pitchfork	8.1/10
PopMatters	9/10

Save Yourself is the fourth studio album by The Make-Up. It was originally released through K Records in 1999.

== Critical reception ==
Justin Stranzl of Popmatters gave the album a 9 out of 10, saying, "Save Yourself is the best party you've ever attended, the best kiss you've ever had, and one of the hottest albums you'll ever hear."

NME named it the 14th best album of 1999.

== Track listing ==
No.	Title	Length
1.	"Save Yourself"	3:22
2.	"White Belts"	2:23
3.	"The Bells"	4:41
4.	"The Prophet"	3:23
5.	"I Am Pentagon"	3:39
6.	"Call Me Mommy"	2:34
7.	"(Make Me a) Feelin' Man"	4:04
8.	"C'Mon, Let's Spawn"	3:45
9.	"Hey Joe"	7:56

== Personnel ==
Credits adapted from liner notes.

- Ian Svenonius – vocals
- James Canty – guitar, keyboards, percussion
- Michelle Mae – bass guitar, vocals
- Steve Gamboa – drums, percussion
- Brendan Canty – vibrachime (on "The Bells"), percussion, production, engineering
- Heather Worley – vocals (on "The Bells" and "Hey Joe")
- Ted Leo – guitar (on "C'Mon, Let's Spawn")
- Fred Erskine – trumpet (on "Call Me Mommy", "(Make Me a) Feelin' Man", and "C'Mon, Let's Spawn")
- John Golden – mastering
- Steve Raskin – graphic design
- Pat Graham – photography
- Garnett Soles – lettering
