= Rock Stars Kill =

Compilation album by various artists
- Released: September 1, 1994
- Genre: Alternative rock
- Label: Kill Rock Stars

Various artists chronology
Stars Kill Rock (1993)	Rock Stars Kill (1994)

Professional ratings
Review scores
Source	Rating
Allmusic	link

Rock Stars Kill is a compilation of various artists released by Kill Rock Stars on September 1, 1994. The compilation was released simultaneously as a vinyl LP with accompanying 7″ single, cassette, and CD.

== Track listing ==
=== LP ===
Side one

1. Tourettes – "Horse Girl"
2. Cupid Car Club – "M.P. Skulkers"
3. Starpower – "Megablot"
4. Boredoms – "Pukulee & Rikulee"
5. Helium with The Bird of Paradise – "Puffin Stars"
6. Spinanes – "Stupid Crazy"
7. Team Dresch – "Seven"
8. Mukilteo Fairies – "We Are Not Your Entertainers"
9. Severed Lethargy – "Rev"

Side two

1. Rancid – "Brixton"
2. Free Kitten – "Feed the Tree"
3. Universal Order of Armageddon – "Painfully Obvious"
4. The Pee Chees – "Patty Coahulla"
5. Star Pimp – "Roche Limit"
6. Pell Mell – "Don the Beachcomber"
7. Smog – "37 Pushups"
8. Kathleen Hanna – "I Wish I Was Him (For Evan Dando)"

7″ single, side one

1. Star Sign Scorpio – "Eskinaut"
2. Hattifatteners – "North Pole"
3. Grouse Mountain Skyride – "Pretty Polly"

7″ single, side two

1. God Is My Co-Pilot – "Anatomically Correct"
2. Fifth Column – "Detoxkiller (Erotic Thriller)"
3. Fleabag – "Pusdog"

=== CD ===
1. Tourettes – "Horse Girl"
2. Cupid Car Club – "M.P. Skulkers"
3. Starpower – "Megablot"
4. Boredoms – "Pukulee & Rikulee"
5. Helium with The Bird of Paradise – "Puffin Stars"
6. Spinanes – "Stupid Crazy"
7. Team Dresch – "Seven"
8. Mukilteo Fairies – "We Are Not Your Entertainers"
9. God Is My Co-Pilot – "Anatomically Correct"
10. Severed Lethargy – "Rev"
11. Rancid – "Brixton"
12. Free Kitten – "Feed the Tree"
13. Universal Order of Armageddon – "Painfully Obvious"
14. The Pee Chees – "Patty Coahuila:
15. Star Pimp – "Roche Limit"
16. Pell Mell – "Don the Beachcomber"
17. Smog – "37 Pushups"
18. Star Sign Scorpio – "Eskinaut"
19. Hattifatteners – "North Pole"
20. Grouse Mountain Skyride – "Pretty Polly"
21. Fifth Column – "Detox Killer (Erotic Thriller)"
22. Fleabag – "Pusdog"
23. Kathleen Hanna – "I Wish I Was Him"
