= Kevin Canty (author) =

American novelist and short story writer

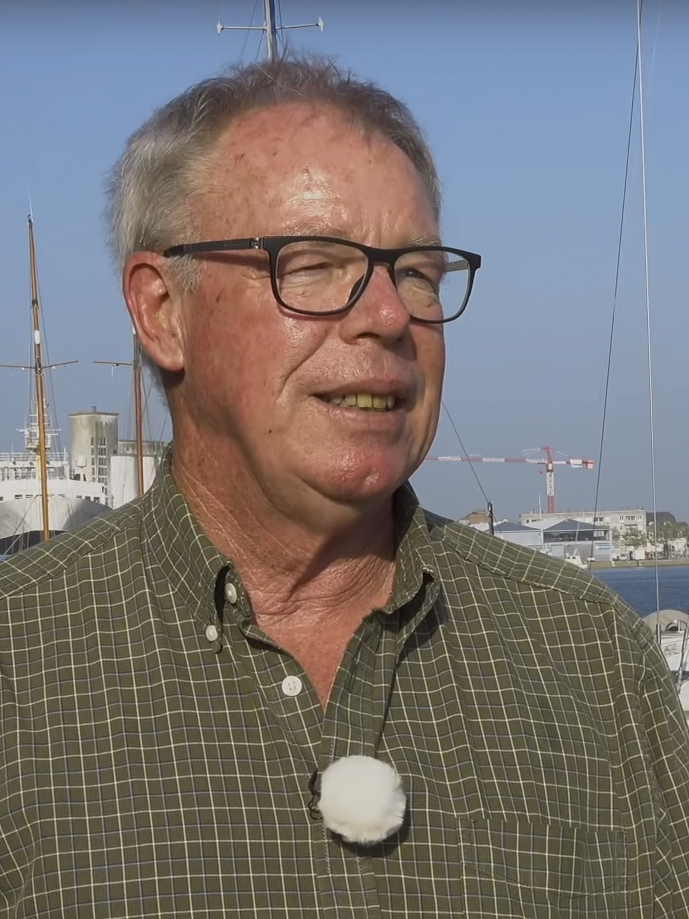
- Canty in 2018
- Born: January 17, 1953 (age 73); Lakeport, California, U.S.
- Education: University of Arizona (MFA)
- Occupations: Novelist and short story writer
- Relatives: Brendan Canty (brother); James Canty (brother)
- Writing career
- Genre: literary fiction

Kevin Canty (born January 17, 1953) is an American novelist and short story writer. He is a faculty member in the English department at the University of Montana at Missoula, where he currently resides. Canty received his master's degree in English from the University of Florida in 1990. He received his M.F.A. in creative writing from the University of Arizona in 1993.

== Personal life ==
Kevin Canty is the brother of the musicians Brendan Canty and James Canty.

== Bibliography ==
=== Novels ===
- Into the Great Wide Open (1997)
- Rounders (1998)
- Nine Below Zero (1999)
- Winslow in Love (2005)
- Everything (2010)
- The Underworld (2017)

=== Short fiction ===
•Happy Endings

==== Collections ====
- A Stranger in This World (1994)
- Honeymoon (2001)
- Where the Money Went (2009)

==== List of stories ====
Title	Year	First published	Reprinted/collected
Mayfly	2013	Canty, Kevin (January 28, 2013). "Mayfly". The New Yorker. Vol. 88, no. 45. pp. 64–68.	
Story, With Bird	2014	Canty, Kevin (October 6, 2014). "Story, With Bird". The New Yorker.	
God's Work	2016	Canty, Kevin (April 4, 2016). "God's Work". The New Yorker.	
