= Pell Mell (band) =

American rock band

- Origin: Portland, Oregon, United States
- Genres: Alternative rock, indie rock, post-rock
- Years active: 1980–1998
- Members: Bob Beerman; Steve Fisk; Greg Freeman; David Spalding
- Past members: Bill Owen; Jon-Lars Sorenson; Arni May

Pell Mell was an instrumental rock combo, formed in 1980 in Portland, Oregon.

== History ==
The band was formed by Arni May, guitar, and Jon-Lars Sorenson, bass, from the Portland avant-garde group UHF; and from local Reed College Bill Owen on guitar, and Bob Beerman on drums. Pell Mell then held auditions for lead singers, but found that their songs sounded better without vocals, and so decided to be a strictly instrumental band. Key influences on the band included the Feelies, the B-52s, Television, Pylon, A Certain Ratio, Josef K, the Fire Engines, James Chance and the Contortions, and Pere Ubu.

This iteration of the group performed and recorded the songs on their first EP release in 1981, Rhyming Guitars, which gave the group exposure over the nation's college radio network. In 1982 the foursome hired a manager, Bruce Pavitt in his pre-Sub Pop career, and did a summer tour of the US, visiting colleges and punk clubs on both coasts. Arni May left the group just as the tour was ready to hit the road, re-birthing Pell Mell as a power trio. This version of the band can be heard on the album Live Cassette, recorded in a Portland club.

The band began work on an EP for Rough Trade Records, titled Bumper Crop, though it would never be released on that label. K Records would release this material alongside a number of live recordings on cassette as For Years We Stood Clearly As One Thing. While in Berkeley, more personnel changes took place. Steve Fisk joined as keyboardist, and after making the recordings for the second album, Jon-Lars returned to his career in engineering.

Pell Mell broke up in 1984. SST Records began releasing Pell Mell material in the late '80s, including a remixed version of Rhyming Guitars and an expanded version of Bumper Crop. During this time, the former bandmates had scattered across the United States, with Beerman living in Philadelphia, Owen having relocated to Hoboken, New Jersey, Freeman staying in San Francisco, and Fisk having moved to Ellensburg, Washington. Beerman began writing new music with the band's soundman David Spalding, and soon Freeman, Owen, and Fisk joined in, each member sending recordings back and forth by mail. The band would reconvene to record this material, released as the full-length Flow on SST.

Over the seventeen years the band existed, it experienced a number of line-up changes and recorded for no less than five labels. The drummer, Bob Beerman remained the only constant member of Pell Mell, but its most permanent and final lineup included other notable musicians like keyboardist Steve Fisk, bassist Greg Freeman and guitarist David Spalding. Fisk is known for his extensive production work as well as his solo music career and work in Pigeonhed and the Halo Benders. Freeman — formerly a member of the Call — was also a producer outside of Pell Mell. David Spalding was the guitar tech for the Call.

Pell Mell's song titled "Nothing Lies Still Long" from the Interstate album featured on HBO's Six Feet Under as recap music. The song was used this way for the entire first and second season, and for most of the third season. The song was also used in the 2001 movie “Joyride” starring Paul Walker and Steve Zahn. Some of the band's music also appeared on The Real World: Road Rules Challenge and NPR's All Things Considered.

== Discography ==
- Live Cassette (Indoor Records, 1982/ Starlight Furniture Company, 2001)
- For Years We Stood Clearly as One Thing (K Records, 1985)
- The Bumper Crop (SST, 1987)
- Rhyming Guitars EP (Indoor Records, 1981/ SST, 1990)
- Flow (SST, 1991)
- Interstate (DGC, 1995)
- Star City (Matador Records, 1997)

== Singles and compilations ==
- "Catwalk" and "Red Rhythm" on Trap Sampler compilation LP (Trap Records, 1981)
- "The Country and the City" on The Lives of Lhasa compilation LP (Lhasa Productions, 1984)
- "Don The Beachcomber" on Rock Stars Kill compilation CD (Kill Rock Stars, 1994)
- "Bring on the China" (demo version) on Step, Step, Steppin' On Satan's Foot compilation CD (Tedium House Publications, 1994)
- "Nothing Lies Still That Long" on Buy-Product compilation sampler (DGC Records, 1995)
- "Swoon" on Kids in the Hall: Brain Candy film soundtrack (Matador Records, 1996)
- "Conversation" on Nigh compilation CD (Castle Von Buhler, 1997)
- Cloverleaf split 7-inch, w/ Acme Rocket Quartet (Lather Records, 1998)
