= Plays Pretty for Baby =

Studio album by Nation of Ulysses
- Released: October 6, 1992
- Recorded: Inner Ear Studios
- Genre: Post-hardcore; hardcore punk; art punk; jazz punk; post-punk
- Length: 49:42
- Label: Dischord
- Producer: Ian MacKaye

Nation of Ulysses chronology
| 13-Point Program to Destroy America (1991) | Plays Pretty for Baby (1992) | The Embassy Tapes (2000) |

Professional ratings
Review scores
| Source | Rating |
|---|---|
| AllMusic | 4.5/5 stars |
| Sputnikmusic | 4/5 stars |

Plays Pretty for Baby is the second album by the American punk rock band Nation of Ulysses.

"The Sound of Jazz to Come" and "50,000 Watts of Goodwill" reference the opening track of A Love Supreme by John Coltrane in their respective openings, while the former references the similarly titled Ornette Coleman album, The Shape of Jazz to Come.

The album's first track begins with a live reading from Thus Spoke Zarathustra:

To you the bold and foolish lambs. To you who are intoxicated with riddles, let's go. Who take pleasure in twilight. Whose souls are lured by noise to every treacherous abyss. For you do not feel for a rope like cowards, and where you can guess you hate to calculate. And where others would poison, you dismember.

== Track listing ==
1. "N-Sub Ulysses" − 3:32
2. "A Comment on Ritual" − 2:27
3. "The Hickey Underworld" − 2:50
4. "Perpetual Motion Machine" − 2:33
5. "N.O.U. Future Vision Hypothesis" − 3:09
6. "50,000 Watts of Goodwill" − 4:05
7. "Maniac Dragstrip" − 2:59
8. "Last Train to Cool" − 3:27
9. "Shakedown" − 3:27
10. "Mockingbird, Yeah!" − 2:59
11. "Depression III" − 3:27
12. "S.S. Exploder" − 2:27
13. "The Kingdom of Heaven Must Be Taken by Storm" − 2:12
14. "The Sound of Jazz to Come" − 4:42
15. "N.O.U.S.P.T.D.A." − 2:51
16. "Presidents of Vice" − 2:35

Tracks 14–16 on the CD are not on the original album, and are taken from the 7-inch EP Birth of the Ulysses Aesthetic.

== Personnel ==
Nation of Ulysses

- James Canty - "The Exploder" (drums)
- Steve Gamboa - "The Grumbler and sometimes the Mumbler" (bass)
- Tim Green - "The Squealer and the Crackler" (guitar)
- Steve Kroner - "The Scraper and the Howler" (guitar)
- Ian Svenonius - "The Sobber, the Roarer, the Hisser, and the Whisperer" (vocals, trumpet)

Background vocals, credited as the "Doo-Wop Assembly"

- Brendan Canty
- Guy Picciotto
- Alec MacKaye
- Billy Karren
- Kathi Wilcox
- Kathleen Hanna
- Tobi Vail

Production

- Ian MacKaye - producer
- Don Zientara - engineering
