= Weird War (album) =

Studio album by Weird War
- Released: August 5, 2002
- Genre: Indie rock
- Length: 31:49
- Label: Drag City; Domino
- Producer: Weird War

Weird War chronology
Weird War (2002)	I Suck on that Emotion (2003)

Neil Hagerty chronology
Plays That Good Old Rock and Roll (2002)	Weird War (2002)	Neil Michael Hagerty & the Howling Hex (2003)

Professional ratings
Review scores
Source	Rating
AllMusic	3/5 stars
The Guardian	3/5 stars
Mojo	(favorable)
NME	(7/10)
Pitchfork Media	(7.3/10)
Q	3/5 stars
Uncut	3.5/5 stars
The Wire	(favorable)

Weird War is the debut album by American indie rock band Weird War, released in 2002.

== Track listing ==
=== Side one ===
1. "Baby It's the Best" − 2:55
2. "Chicago Charlemagne" − 2:35
3. "Who's Who" − 2:18
4. "FN Rat" − 3:25
5. "Grass" − 2:07
6. "Ibex Club" − 2:05

=== Side two ===
1. "Name Names" − 3:11
2. "Burgers and Fries" − 3:07
3. "I Live in a Dream" − 2:30
4. "Pick Up the Phone and Ball" − 2:05
5. "Family Cong" − 1:41
6. "Weird War" − 1:13
7. "Man is Money" − 2:37

== Personnel ==
- Stephen McCarty– drums, vocals
- Jessica Espeleta – guitar, vocals
- Neil Hagerty – guitar, vocals
- Michelle Mae – bass, vocals
- Ian Svenonius – vocals
