= Lung Leg (band) =

Scottish indie punk band

- Origin: Glasgow, Scotland
- Genre: Pop-punk • indie rock • garage rock • riot grrrl
- Years active: 1994–1999 • 2022–present
- Label: Piao! • Vesuvius • KRS • Guided Missile • Southern Records • Last Night from Glasgow
- Members: Jane "Jane Egypt" McKeown; Annie Spandex; Simone Antigone; Paul Thomson; Hando Morice
- Past members: Amanda "Jade Green" Doorbar; Maureen "Momo" Quinn; Philippa "Photo Smith" Smith; Todd Parmenter

Lung Leg are a Scottish pop-punk/indie band formed in 1994. They emerged as part of a new wave of bands from the Glasgow DIY underground scene. Originally an all female quartet, their musical style has been described variably as riot grrrl or garage-pop. They were influenced by post-punk, C86, and the Fire Engines.

After their initial disbandment in 1999, Lung Leg re-formed in 2021 with new members Simone Antigone (Hair Band), Hando Morice (Water Machine) and Paul Thomson (Franz Ferdinand). They played a sold out reunion gig at The Baby Grand, Glasgow in December 2022 to critical acclaim supported by bis, and supported Washington DC band The Make Up in 2023.. They are featured in the award winning 2024 documentary Since Yesterday : The Untold Story and consequently performed Maid to Minx live on BBC Radio 4's Front Row with Kirsty Wark in October 2024.

In October 2025, Lung Leg released their first new music since 1998, the track "Girls", on a 7-inch single with Unmarry Me, featuring guest saxophone by Lora Logic.

The single's sleeve artwork was designed by Annabel Wright of The Pastels, incorporating sketches of Lung Leg recording in the studio.

In April 2026, Lung Leg were featured in ‘Something For The Longing - Scottish Independent Pop 1985 - 1999’ , a 3CD box set released on Cherry Red, compiled by author and director Grant McPhee (of films Big Gold Dream, Teenager Superstars)

Jane McKeown and Annie Spandex were also interviewed for Grant McPhee’s forthcoming book ‘Scene Within a Scene: Scottish Independent Music 1992 - 2001’

The Love and Rockets graphic artist Jamie Hernandez drew the original album cover for Maid to Minx.

== History ==
Lung Leg formed in late 1993 in Glasgow, Scotland, with a lineup of Jane McKeown ("Jane Egypt") on bass and vocals, Annie Spandex and Maureen Quinn ("Mo Mo") on guitar and vocals, and Amanda Doorbar ("Jade Green") on drums. The band took their name from one of their inspirations - Lung Leg (Elisabeth Carr), a model and actress famous for roles in films of the transgressive movement (and on Sonic Youth's album cover EVOL); Annie Spandex has cited the films of John Waters as also being another important influence.

In the 1990s, the burgeoning DIY music scene was indicative of a broader cultural shift in Glasgow, which saw a rise in independent record labels (eg. Vesuvius and Chemikal Underground) and grass roots music venues (eg. the Kazoo Club at the 13th Note run by Alex Kapranos) enabling more inter-connectivity and support, a spirit which extended into the visual arts and club culture; indeed Lung Leg remarked that they, ‘considered themselves to be privileged in living in a city that was welcoming towards girls in bands.’ A number of all female groups based in and around Glasgow emerged during that time: Hello Skinny, Pink Kross, Sally Skull, Space Kittens and Lung Leg. Some of these bands were linked to the 'riot grrrl' movement - which emerged in 1991 - however collectively their sounds were more diverse than those first associated with that movement. Additionally - as discussed in the documentary, ‘Since Yesterday’ they shared a common bond strengthened by Fanzine culture, exemplified when Hello Skinny, Pink Kross and Lung Leg performed together at The Cat House supporting British post-punk band The Rain Coats in July 1994.

Lung Leg went on to release The Negative Delinquent Autopsy (1994) and Shagg the Tiger (1995) EPs on the Piao! label. Both were named "Single of the Week" by Melody Maker. The two EPs were later compiled together as the 1997 10" EP Hello Sir on Kill Rock Stars Amanda Doorbar left in 1996 and was replaced by Todd Parmenter, previously of English band Menswear. This second lineup recorded their debut album, Maid to Minx, released in 1997 on the Vesuvius label. The lyrics for the title track were written by Danny Saunders ( Correcto).

Early in their career they travelled the UK with label mates The Yummy Fur. They played on the same bill with many notable acts - including Bis, Urusei Yatsura, Huggy Bear, Cornershop, Jacob's Mouse - and they supported Bikini Kill in April 1996 (with Bis and Team Dresch) at The Cat House Glasgow, Sonic Youth at Manchester Academy in 1996 (with The Make Up), Free Kitten in Edinburgh, and Fugazi in May 1999 at The Glasgow School of Art.

Everett True, then assistant editor of Melody Maker - the first UK journalist to cover the Seattle music scene in early 1989 and interview Nirvana, and responsible for bringing Hole, Pavement, Soundgarden, and a host of other bands to international attention - championed Lung Leg early in their career. He wrote in The Melody Maker reviewing their support slot for Kim Gordon and Julia Cafritz ‘s band Free Kitten at The Venue, Edinburgh:

On their debut single, Lungleg sounded like seven short, sharp, invigorating slaps across the face, seven frantic, finely controlled blasts of pure pop/punk noise and fun-time feeling. Sussed, sudden, smashing!

... Lungleg are vital because they understand what makes great pop tick... They understand the urgency of their situation, know it's important to look as cool and as awkward as the way you sound. They understand the adrenalin rush of a finely placed shriek, a snappily executed, two-note bass run. They know that dissonance can be a weapon, too. And, most importantly, their influences are way cool.

Beth Ditto, known for her work with the band Gossip cites Lung Leg as one of her many musical influences, most recently on BBC radio 6 music's podcast, "Journeys in Sound".

Jane McKeown was also the drummer for Vesuvius labelmates Dick Johnson. When Maureen Quinn quit Lung Leg in 1997, they recruited her replacement, Philippa ("Photo Smith") Smith, from Dick Johnson. This final lineup re-recorded the album for Southern Records and embarked on their sole tour of the US in 1998 with the Make-Up, and recorded two final singles, "Krayola" (a split 7" with The Make Up) in 1998 and "Maid to Minx" (a new recording of the title track from the debut album) in 1999 backed with Juanita. John Peel played tracks from the band's debut single, The Negative Delinquent Autopsy, in 1994 and would play further material from the group until the end of the 90's, including two John Peel Sessions they recorded for his shows between 1995 and 1996 at Maida Vale Studios, London.

Lung Leg split after a final farewell gig in May 1999; the remixed and partially rerecorded version of their debut album was re-released in 1998 on Southern Records.

Lung Leg re-formed in 2021 with new members, Simone Antigone (Hair Band), Hando Morice (Water Machine) and Paul Thomson (Franz Ferdinand). The Glasgow label, Last Night from Glasgow reissued Maid to Minx in 2022 with additional bonus tracks.

One of Lung Leg's unique merchandising ideas is branded pants - with 'Lung Leg' printed on the crotch. Marc Baines, Glasgow based printmaker and cartoonist (& formerly involved with co-running the Vesuvius Records label) designed the 7” sleeves for ‘Theme Park’ and ‘Right Now Baby’ Examples of these 7” sleeves can be found on permanent exhibit at the Riverside Museum, Glasgow.

Scottish band Franz Ferdinand recorded a cover version of ‘Maid to Minx’ for BBC Scotland, for Vic Galloway in April 2014 as yet unreleased. Interestingly, it was the same studio location in Glasgow, in which Lung Leg recorded a session for Kirsty Wark - with drummer Paul Thompson - a decade later.

== Other projects ==
Jane McKeown formed Peter Parker with Roz Davies (Josephine and Miss the Occupier), Jeremy Mills (Peeps into Fairyland, Idlewild) and Tori Firth. Releasing two seven inches on the Glasgow label, Say Dirty Records: Swallow the Rockets 2009, and Pretty Living, 2010 - which was a split single with Fire Engines' Davy Henderson's new band, the Sexual Objects.

Peter Parker also played two Marc Reilly sessions on BBC 6 music and performed at the Belle and Sebastian curated ATP Festival. Jane subsequently formed Spreadeagle with Jeremy Mills.

Annie Spandex plays with Normal Service formed alongside Kevin Burrows (The Keatons and Gag, The Spores) with Graham Gavin (Subliminal Girls, Lugworm, Ganger) Fiona Henderson, and Georgie White (Painted X Ray)

Mo Quinn played in Nico's Bike, and now sings, plays guitar and melodica in Portsmouth/Nancy/Larne based group Action Painting! and cowrote their track Magdalen that Louder Than War called beautiful. She also appears in Kent based rockabillyish outfit, War Tortoise and her own band Thee Misty.

== Members ==
Current Members

- Jane "Jane Egypt" McKeown – vocals, bass (1993- 1999, 2022–present)
- Annie Spandex – vocals, guitar, violin (1993-1999, 2022–present)
- Simone Antigone – vocals, guitar (2022–present)
- Paul Thomson – drums (2022–present)
- Hando Hando (2022–present)

Former

- Amanda "Jade Green" Doorbar - vocals, drums (1993 - 1996, 2022 for reunion show)
- Maureen "MoMo" Quinn - vocals, guitar.(1993–1997)
- Todd Parmenter - drums, vocals (1996–1999)
- Philippa "Photo Smith" Smith (1997–1999)

== Discography ==
=== Studio albums ===
- Maid to Minx (1997, Vesuvius; 1998), Southern Records)
- Maid to Minx (2022) Last Night From Glasgow

=== Singles and EPs ===
- The Negative Delinquent Autopsy 7-inch EP (1994, Piao!)
- Shagg the Tiger 7-inch EP (1995, Piao!)
- "Right Now Baby" 7-inch single (1997, Vesuvius)
- "Theme Park" 7-inch single (1997, Guided Missile)
- "Club Beatroot Part Six" split 7-inch single with El Hombre Trajeado (1997, Flotsam & Jetsam)
- "Krayola" split 7-inch single with the Make-Up (1998, Vesuvius/Southern Records)
- "Maid to Minx" 7-inch single (1999, Southern Records)
- “Girls” featuring Lora Logic (X-Ray Spex/Essential Logic) split 7” single with Unmarry Me (Second City Rhythm) - October 2025

=== Compilation albums ===
- Hello Sir (1997, Kill Rock Stars)
