= Extra Golden =

Extra Golden is a musical ensemble founded by two Americans and one Kenyan.

== History ==
Bandmember Ian Eagleson studied Benga music from Nairobi for his Ph.D. thesis, and received assistance from Otieno Jagwasi, a Kenyan musician who played in a group called Orchestra Extra Solar Africa. Eagleson traveled with Jagwasi to Africa to continue his studies in 2004, bringing studio equipments along. His friend Alex Minoff, of Weird War, visited him in April 2004, and the three of them recorded an album together during their stay, which was released on Thrill Jockey Records. Jagwasi died of liver failure in 2005, but the remaining two members collaborated further with Jagwasi's brother, Onyago Wuod Omari (a drummer in Orchestra Extra Solar Africa) and Opiyo Bilongo, an established Benga musician. Two more albums with this configuration arrived in 2007 and 2009.

== Discography ==
- Ok-Oyot System (Thrill Jockey Records, 2006)
- Hera Ma Nono (Thrill Jockey, 2007)
- Thank You Very Quickly (Thrill Jockey, 2009)
