= Scene of Irony =

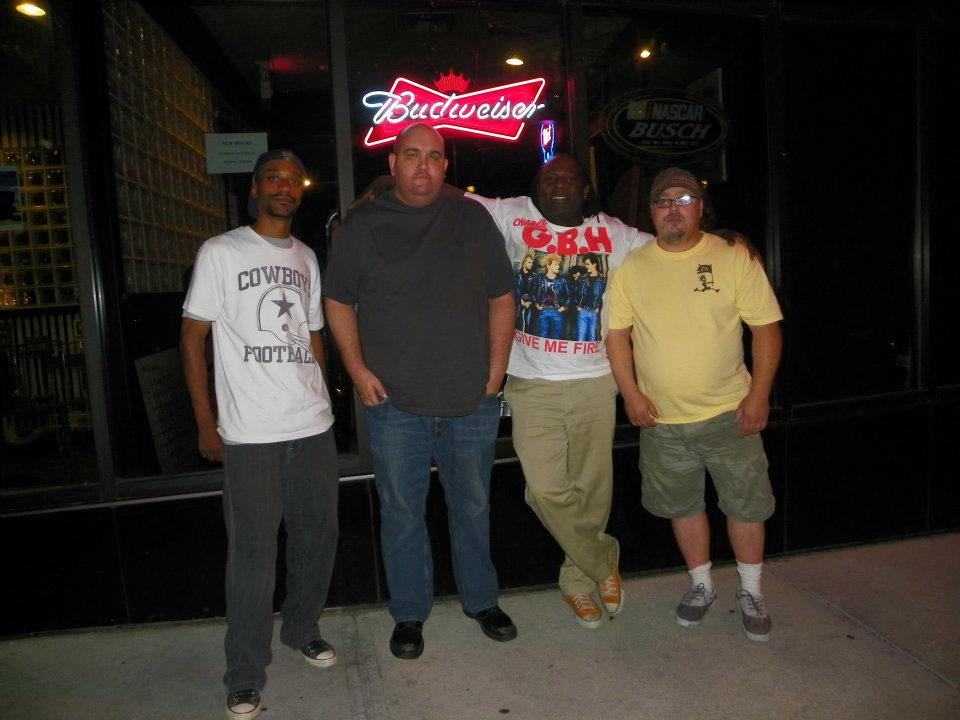
- Scene of Irony outside of Lemmons in Saint Louis, Missouri

Background information
- Origin: St.Louis, Missouri, United States
- Genre: Punk rock
- Years active: 2004-present
- Members: Maurice "Moe" Holmes; Shaughnessy Denney; Alex Black; Dillon Dunnagan
- Past members: Donnell Robinson; Raj Narayan; Jay Lipe; Darren Moore; Shelley Koesterer; Shawn G. Combs

Scene of Irony is an American punk rock band from St. Louis. Their musical style is a combination of street punk and alternative rock. They have released three CDs: When Kids Attack (2007), Word on the Street (2010) and We Own the Night (2013).

The band includes Maurice "Moe" Holmes on lead vocals and guitar, Shaughnessy Denney bass, Alex Black on drums, and Dillon Dunnagan guitar and backing vocals

== Career ==
Scene of Irony formed after Moe Holmes got rejected by a rock band that Donnell played drums in that was auditioning singers. The band thought Holmes sounded "too punk" and turned him down. Disappointed after getting rejected, Holmes decided to form his own band. He purchased a guitar, and a Marshall half-stack and started practicing to teach himself guitar. Donnell came by Moe's apartment to listen to the songs he had written and said he needed more practice. After six months, Donnell returned to Moe's apartment and agreed to form a band with him. Moe placed an ad at Vintage Vinyl for a bass player and Shaughnessy Denney answered the ad a week later. The three practiced once, and decided to officially become a band on April 1, 2004. After being a band for two and a half years, Shaughnessy and Donnell wanted to add a lead guitarist to the band. Shawn Combs came to see Scene of Irony perform at The Pageant located in St. Louis, Missouri, and asked to join the band. After "jamming" with Shawn a couple of times, Combs was officially in the band. On March 24, 2007, Scene of Irony released its debut album titled When Kids Attack. Three years later, they released their second album, Word on the Street. On April 7, 2013, Scene of irony released its third CD, titled We Own the Night. After the CD release of We Own the Night, Scene of Irony decided to part ways with its founding drummer Donnell Robinson due to personal issues. On March 29, 2014, Scene of Irony held their 10-year anniversary show at Fubar in Saint Louis featuring legendary punk band Charged GBH. GBH flew in for one show specifically for Scene of Irony's show. Donnell and Raj reunited with the band to perform a couple of songs for the special occasion. Scene of Irony toured the Midwest with GBH in September 2014. Scene of Irony continues to perform shows across the United States and England.They have opened for several national acts, including: Ultraman, Charged GBH, The Business, The Exploited, Street Dogs, Swingin' Utters, The Queers, Voodoo Glow Skulls, The Casualties, Koffin Kats, Total Chaos, Flatfoot 56, Calabrese, Alien Ant Farm and Zero Boys. Scene of Irony has made its debut at Rebellion Festivals on Friday, August 7, 2015 in Blackpool, UK. Scene of irony released its 4th studio CD "Wolves in Punk Clothing" on March 20, 2016 at Vintage Vinyl.

== Discography ==
=== Studio albums ===
- When Kids Attack (March 24, 2007) (Southside Scene Records)
- Word on the Street (April 25, 2010) (Southside Scene Records)
- We Own the Night (April 7, 2013) (Scene of irony Records)
- Wolves in Punk Clothing (March 20, 2016) (Scene of irony Records)
