= I Suck on That Emotion =

Studio album by Scene Creamers (Weird War)
- Released: January 28, 2003
- Genre: Indie rock
- Length: 42:14
- Label: Drag City

Scene Creamers (Weird War) chronology
Weird War (2002)	I Suck on That Emotion (2003)	If You Can't Beat 'Em, Bite 'Em (2004)

Professional ratings
Review scores
Source	Rating
AllMusic	4/5 stars
Pitchfork Media	(7.5/10)

I Suck on That Emotion is the second studio album by Weird War, recorded and released under the short-lived name Scene Creamers.

Track #11, "Here Comes The Judge, Pt II", shares the same name as a The Make-Up song from their 1997 album After Dark, of which Svenonius, Mae, and Minoff were all members.

== Track listing ==
1. "Better All the Time" − 4:15
2. "Session Man" − 2:47
3. "Wet Paint" − 4:32
4. "Candidate" − 3:44
5. "Luxembourg" − 2:13
6. "Bag Inc." − 3:55
7. "Elfin Orphan" − 2:35
8. "What About Me?" − 4:40
9. "Hey Lonnie" − 2:56
10. "Housework for 3" − 2:46
11. "Here Comes The Judge, Pt II" − 3:02
12. "One Stone" − 4:05

== Personnel ==
- Blake Brunner – drums
- Michelle Mae – electric bass, electric guitar, voices
- Alex Minoff – electric guitar, voices
- Ian Svenonius – vocals
- Phil Manley – engineer
