= Interstate (album) =

Studio album by Pell Mell
- Released: 25 April 1995
- Recorded: August 1993, June and October 1994
- Studio: Lowdown, San Francisco; Fort Apache Studios, Cambridge
- Genre: Post-rock; instrumental rock
- Length: 49:19
- Label: DGC
- Producer: Pell Mell

Pell Mell chronology
Flow (1991)	Interstate (1995)	Star City (1997)

Interstate is the fifth album by American post-rock and instrumental rock band Pell Mell, released in 1995. After issuing Flow in 1991, the band members wrote new material separately, sending each other ideas, until more concrete ideas were becoming formed, leading to the band recording Interstate between two studios in 1993 and 1994. Defined by a breezy, wide-open sound, Interstate features sparse, rhythmic guitar riffs, organ playing, drums and thematic instrumentation, in addition to a distinctive compositional style that has been compared to "the dynamics of a good conversation" by one critic. Additionally, the album has been considered a post-rock album and critics have noticed its display of krautrock influences.

Named in relation to the band's collaborative efforts given that the members live great distances from each other, Interstate was released on DGC, their only album on a major label. Several journalists have pointed out the unlikeliness of the album being released on a major label. Nonetheless, the album was greeted with critical acclaim, with critics complimenting its tight, ensemble sound. It was a mild radio success, reaching number 37 on the CMJ Top 75 Alternative Radio Play chart, and has since been accredited as having helped widen the audience for alienated instrumental rock.

== Background and recording ==
Instrumental rock band Pell Mell, who were "deeply involved" in the 1990s alternative movement, had existed since the early 1980s, and although based in Portland, Oregon, the band members lived in four separate American coastal cities, composing music by sending ideas to each other via e-mail, telephone or post: "Ideas are sent back and forth and when something takes shape, the members then converge in one city to record as a band." By 1995, the band consisted of four multi-instrumentalists: Greg Freeman, Robert Beerman, David Spalding and Steve Fisk, the first three of whom made up the band's trio of guitarists.

By the time Pell Mell began recording Interstate, David Spalding had become the band's "new key and core member." This follows in the footsteps of the band's previous album, Flow (1991), their final album for SST Records which saw Spalding write seven of the album's tracks. He is credited as a writer on ten of the twelve tracks on Interstate, two of which were co-written by Beerman and two others co-written by Freeman, who also contributed two of his own tracks.

In August 1993, the band began recording Interstate at Lowdown, San Francisco, and continued recording in June and October 1994 at Fort Apache Studios, Cambridge. The album was also engineered at both studios and mixed at the latter alone, while being mastered by Eddy Schreyer at Los Angeles' Future Disc. The band's "unsurprising ability" in self-producing the album, alongside several members of the album engineering and mixing the album with help from Tim O'Heir, contributes to the album's "full-sounding" and "dramatic" sound.

== Music ==
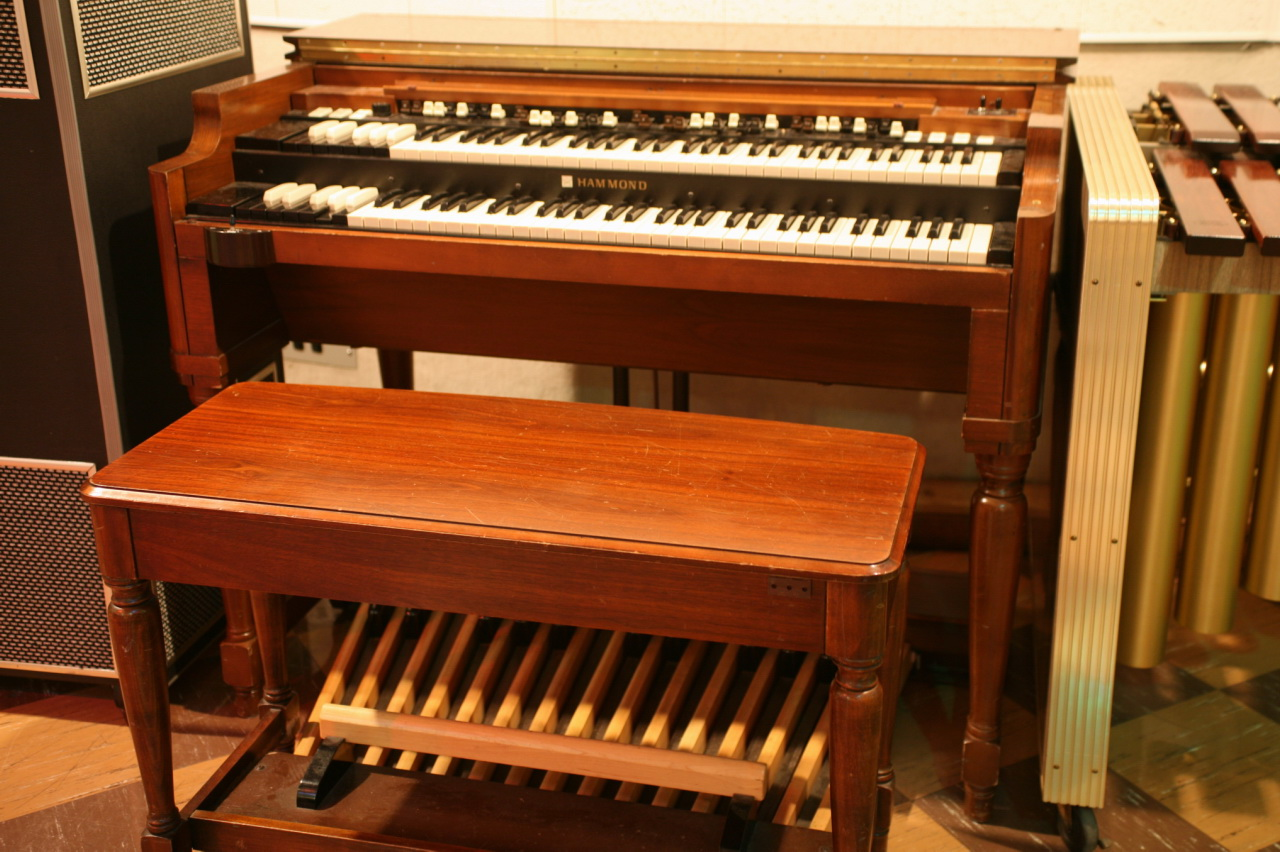
Steve Fisk's usage of a Hammond B-3 helps contribute to the album's sound.

Interstate uses only guitars, drums and organ to create its "striking and often emotional take on instrumental rock." The record is driven by rhythmic, sparse and evocative guitar riffs, and piano hooks which are then "exalted by Steve Fisk's Hammond B-3 organ, occasional mellontronic meddlings and thematic guitar melodies." Several critics highlighted the album's ensemble dynamic and breezy, open feel; Ned Raggett of AllMusic noted a "wide-open feeling of many of the songs, suggesting a slightly dreamy America where there's little around but the weather and the land," while Tim Kenneally of SF Weekly similar noted the album works as a "sonic analogue to a cross-country road trip." Describing the track structures, Bob Gulla of CMJ New Music Monthly said:

"Each song on Interstate works like the dynamics of a good conversation. First, a thought in the form of a guitar line is introduced. Then comes a response, the reaction to that thought: a shuffling drum beat, maybe. Then another response comes from a third party, perhaps a dissenting voice, a thumping counter-bass line, that momentarily takes the song in a different direction. As the conversation kicks in, the voices take it in ever-shifting directions."

The band's press release described the album as possessing a "post-rock, guitar centric, instrumental sound design that's difficult to categorize." Indeed, Spin magazine described the record as "leaning towards moody surf rock and proto-post rock when [the band] leaned towards any rock at all." Michael Lipton of LA Weekly wrote that Interstate "recalled spaghetti Westerns, the minimalist rhythms of '80s N.Y. band Polyrock and a dash of Booker T. organ." Anthony Violanti, writing for The Buffalo News, meanwhile, noted the "old-fashioned style," citing the usage of "tight guitars, a tough bass and driving drum riffs that all blend in instrumental form." Len Comaratta of Consequence of Sound compared the album to "Outer Accelerator" by Stereolab from their album Mars Audiac Quintet (1994).

Opening track "Nothing Lies Still Long" has been compared to the Ventures, and is followed by "Revival", which is similarly rock-flavored. "Anna Karina" is a slower, wistful track with "hints of steel guitar twang." Raggett described it and "Constellation", which is "layered with twangy guitar beats," as two examples of the album's wide-open feel. The band's "longtime fascination with krautrock" is evident with the motorik drive on "Saucer", reminiscent of Can and Stereolab, and driven by "an incessant beat and driving bass," and "Blacktop." Fisk in particular has been highlighted on several tracks, including with his "buzzing organ break" on "Revival" and "his Hammond work" on "Vegetable Kingdom."

== Release ==
Pell Mell were struggling to think of a name for the album, leading graphic designer Clifford Stoltze to recommend the name Interstate, as a reference to the band members living "in four different cities [being] able to stay together by sending audio tapes through the mail and traveling to meet for recording sessions;" the band agreed on the name. Stoltze then worked with Beerman, himself also a graphic designer, on designing the album sleeve, by pulling together an "abundance of materials." The album cover depicts a photograph that Stoltze snapped on a road trip through Wyoming, while other photographs taken by band members are also used in the album sleeve. Taking inspiration from the album title, Stoltze chose the Interstate typeface for the band's name on the cover.

"The success of Flow helped make Pell Mell one of the more intriguing major-label signings of the 1990s — who could have imagined Geffen being interested in an all-instrumental group?"

—Trouser Press

Interstate was released by major label DGC on 25 April 1995 in the United States as their first and only album on a major label. Many have commented on the unlikeliness of the album's release on DGC; Ned Raggett wrote: "the idea that Pell Mell would have ended up on a company run by David Geffen must have seemed truly bizarre when the band first started, but that's what a little Nirvana can do for bands (and so it must have seemed for many an alternative outfit in the early '90s)." Similarly, in 2013, Spin ranked the album at number 13 in its list of the "40 Weirdest Post-Nevermind Major Label Albums," with Andrew Earles of the magazine saying:

"Put simply, this music never exactly presented itself as a radio-friendly unit-shifter. So how did these gentlemen end up on DGC? Label desperation? An A&R guy with sophisticated taste and no supervision? An A&R guy seduced by the minor popularity of instrumental group Shadowy Men on a Shadowy Planet because they wrote the Kids in the Hall theme song?"

In addition to CD and cassette editions, the album was also released as a translucent gold LP in the United States. The album was a mild radio success, reaching number 34 on CMJ's "Top 75 Alternative Radio Play" chart, compiled from airplay reports of the most played alternative releases on around 500 different commercial, non-commercial and college radio stations. New Zealand-based independent label Flying Nun Records released Interstate in Europe in 1995, or, in some regions, on March 4, 1996.

== Critical reception ==
Professional ratings
Review scores
Source	Rating
AllMusic	4/5 stars
The Buffalo News	4/5 stars
CMJ New Music Monthly	(favourable)
Ox Fanzine	(favourable)
Trouser Press	(favourable)

Interstate was met to overwhelmingly positive reviews, with the album's warm, band dynamic and relaxed feel being frequently highlighted. Anthony Violanti of The Buffalo News rated the album four stars out of five and said: "Pell Mell has one of the most original sounds in contemporary music. It's refreshing to see an instrumental band back in rock 'n' roll." Ned Raggett of AllMusic gave the album the same rating, saying "it's an ensemble performance at heart, and an excellent one" which was the most fine example of the band's talents. CMJ New Music Monthly named the album "Best New Music", and Bob Gulla's review for the magazine noted the album's no-frills "good old-fashioned ensemble chemistry" and unexpected feel.

Thomas Kerpen of the Ox fanzine was favorable and highlighted the album's "great instrumental sounds" and particularly the "melodic atmospheric guitars, no wonder with three guitarists." Similarly favorable although slightly more reserved, Paul Lukas and Ira Robbins of Trouser Press described Interstate as "a solid continuation of Flow's sound, although it has less consistently stellar material."

In early 1996, Raoul Hernandez of The Austin Chronicle ranked the album at number 6 in his favourite American, non-local albums of 1995, joint place with fellow instrumental rock band Friends of Dean Martinez's The Shadow of Your Smile. He wrote that the two albums, alongside the music of Dirty Three, The Mermen and The Denison/Kimball Trio, "helped bring instrumental modes of rock alienation into the mainstream." Radio series Living on Earth have used "Anna Karina" as soundtrack music. Mars Simpson of Treble Zine suggested that Japancakes' Loveless (2007) was similar to Interstate, Tortoise's TNT (1998) and My Bloody Valentine's Loveless (1991). "Nothing Lies Still Long" was used on earlier seasons of Six Feet Under as the music played during the recap segment prior to the start of the episode.

== Track listing ==
No.	Title	Length
1.	"Nothing Lies Still Long"	4:11
2.	"Revival"	4:33
3.	"Anna Karina"	3:02
4.	"Saucer"	3:30
5.	"Pound Cake"	3:43
6.	"Constellation"	4:00
7.	"Blacktop"	3:24
8.	"Butterfly Effect"	4:34
9.	"Drift"	4:10
10.	"Vegetable Kingdom"	6:27
11.	"Ether"	4:39
12.	"Floating Gate"	3:43
Total length:		49:19

== Personnel ==
=== Musicians ===
- Greg Freeman – bass guitar, guitar
- Robert Beerman – drums, guitar
- David Spalding – guitar, bass
- Steve Fisk – piano, organ, noises

=== Other ===
- Clifford Stoltze – design, photography
- Robert Beerman – design
- Greg Freeman – engineer, mixing
- Tim O’Heir – engineer, mixing
- Walton ‘Wally’ Gagel – engineering assistant, mixing
- Steve Fisk – mixing
- Kelly Spalding – photography
- Eddy Schreyer – mastering
