= The Nation of Ulysses =

American rock band (1988–1992)

Background information
- Also known as: Ulysses (1988–1989)
- Origin: Washington, D.C., U.S.
- Genres: Punk rock; post-hardcore; hardcore punk
- Years active: 1988–1992
- Labels: Dischord; K; Southern
- Spinoffs: Cupid Car Club; Make-Up; Weird War
- Past members: Ian Svenonius; Steve Kroner; Tim Green; Steve Gamboa; James Canty
- Website: Official site

The Nation of Ulysses was an American punk rock band from Washington, D.C., formed in spring 1988 with four members. Originally known as simply Ulysses, the first mark of the group consisted of Ian Svenonius on vocals and trumpet, Steve Kroner on guitar, Steve Gamboa on bass guitar, and James Canty on drums. Tim Green joined the band late in 1989 as a guitarist and the band became "Nation of Ulysses." Nation of Ulysses disbanded in the autumn of 1992, having failed to complete their third album. After the breakup, Svenonius, Canty, and Gamboa went on to form the short-lived Cupid Car Club and Make-Up. Tim Green went on to join the Young Ginns, the Fucking Champs, and later Concentrick, a solo project with a focus on ambient music.

Nation of Ulysses was known for their far-left politics, their extremely physical live performances, and their unique take on punk culture and fashion. In total, Nation of Ulysses released three full-length albums, and two vinyl EPs released on Dischord Records, and were featured on a number of compilation albums on a variety of record labels.

== History ==
The band formed in spring 1988, initially composed of four members – Ian Svenonius on vocals and trumpet, Steve Kroner on guitar, Steve Gamboa on bass guitar, and James Canty on drums – and known simply as "Ulysses." In late 1989, Tim Green joined the band as a second guitarist and the band was renamed to "Nation of Ulysses."

In 1990, before the band released any official albums, Svenonius was featured as teen-oriented Sassy Magazine's first "Sassiest Boy in America." He was interviewed at length in the magazine's October issue, going into some depth about the band's sound and political motivations.

In 1991 they released their first full-length album, 13-Point Program to Destroy America on Dischord Records. This was followed a year later by Plays Pretty for Baby, also on Dischord. During the recording of the band's follow-up to Plays Pretty for Baby, Kroner left the band. The remaining quartet continued to record, but eventually dissolved in 1992. In a later interview, Svenonius explained the reason for the split: "Nation of Ulysses broke up because the epoch changed with the advent of digital music and the Nirvana explosion. We were faced with what's now known as indie rock, a sort of vacuous form. We had to determine our next move and this [the forming of the Make-Up] is it."

After the band's dissolution, Svenonius went on to form the short-lived Cupid Car Club, the Make-Up (both with Canty and Gamboa), and Weird War. Green went on to become an engineer and record producer and joined the progressive metal band the Fucking Champs.

Though relatively short-lived, Nation of Ulysses' influence has been substantial: they have been cited as influences for bands such as Glassjaw, the (International) Noise Conspiracy, the Hives, Thursday, Refused, Boysetsfire, Bikini Kill, Rocket from the Crypt, Antioch Arrow, the Locust, Death from Above 1979, At the Drive-In, LCD Soundsystem, Bis and Huggy Bear, among many others.

== Recordings ==
During Nation of Ulysses' four years of activity, they released only two full-length albums: 13-Point Program to Destroy America in 1991 and Plays Pretty for Baby in 1992, both released on Dischord Records. After releasing Plays Pretty for Baby, the band began recording a third full-length album, but Kroner separated from the band before recording was completed. The remaining quartet continued to record, but the group eventually dissolved before the record's completion. In 2000, six songs from those sessions, in addition to four new tracks recorded live, were compiled and released posthumously as The Embassy Tapes.

In addition to their three full-length albums, Nation of Ulysses released two vinyl EPs. The first, a self-titled EP, was the band's first official release, but went out of print when the three tracks from it were included in 13-Point Program to Destroy America. The second EP, released in 1992 under the title The Birth of the Ulysses Aesthetic (the synthesis of speed and transformation), also went out of print when its tracks were later released on Plays Pretty for Baby. The band were also featured in a number of compilation albums on a variety of record labels.

In 1992, NOU was on tour with Bikini Kill, and when they arrived in Memphis, they found that the promoter for the show hadn't actually promoted the show. So, while out on the town flyering the streets and ducking into record stores, NOU ran into Primal Scream, a band which had been in town recording their own album. Primal Scream decided to attend NOU's show at the Antenna Club and then proceeded to invite NOU to record with them in the studio the next day. Nation of Ulysses recorded five songs with Primal Scream in nine hours, though only after a quick errand for some tin foil for the members of Primal Scream to smoke a bit of crack, according to Tim Green. These recordings are known as Memphis Demos, and include the demos of N-Sub Ulysses, 50,000 Watts, Mockingbird, Yeah, and Shakedown.

== Musical ideology and style ==
Nation of Ulysses' music was noisy and manic, but they also had a strong free-jazz influence. The group embodied a rejection of the 1960s and 1970s music and styling by rejecting drug use and advocating that punk youth dress nicely and sensibly. To this end, the liner notes of 13-Point Program to Destroy America states the band's aim "To dress well, as clothing and fashion, are the only things which we -- the kids -- being utterly disenfranchised, have any control over." Much of the band admitted to not knowing how to play their instruments well, stating "All you need is a concept. There's no reason you have to sound like Led Zeppelin."

== Political concepts ==
The Birth of the Ulysses Aesthetic EP by Nation of Ulysses.

Nation of Ulysses described themselves not as a rock 'n' roll group in the traditional sense, but "as a political party" and as "a shout of secession." Explaining their intent, Svenonius said "it's basically a new nation underground for the dispossessed youth colony. It's all about smashing the old edifice, the monolith of rock and roll."

AllMusic's Steve Huey described the Nation of Ulysses' philosophy as "a relentlessly provocative (and entertaining) jumble of teenage rock 'n' roll rebellion, leftist radicalism, anarchist punk polemics, and abstract intellectual rambling, [...] [which gives the sense of] an off-kilter, almost tongue-in-cheek approach to a 'perpetual 18-year old's' view of America, and life in general." This tongue-in-cheek political attitude was echoed by a spoken-word introduction to the song "The Sound of Jazz to Come", from their 1992 The Birth of the Ulysses Aesthetic EP, in which the band describes themselves as "the seriously unserious, reverently irreverent, amoral moralists."

Asked about their use of the medium they claimed to counteract – rock 'n' roll – Svenonius declared "Well, it's a camouflage, to allow for movement, revolutionary liberation from the constraints of everyday composure, basically allowing anybody to move in anyway that they want and to lift spirit to a plateau to destroy 'parent culture.' "

Nation of Ulysses claimed to make weapons, not records. Discussing their second release, Svenonius asserted: "it's like a blueprint for the destruction of the Parent Culture. It's like a zip gun ... It's an instruction pamphlet for kids on how to destroy their home life, you know, their domestic state."

Although their first album was named 13-Point Program to Destroy America, Nation of Ulysses didn't align themselves with a particular political philosophy: "We don't usually address normal political dictums. We aim toward the everyday fixtures of life, like aesthetics, sound, non-spoken things that are inherently political in nature instead of, like bogus politicians who focus on glossy surface issues which avoid any kind of revolutionary change."

=== Ulysses Speaks ===
"Ulysses Speaks" zine, issue No. 4

Nation of Ulysses published a zine called "Ulysses Speaks," which was an extension of their ideology expressed in their music and liner notes. The zines espoused what they referred to as "The Ulysses Aesthetic," which was a mix of 1960s and 1970s radical politics, French Situationist writings, and juvenile delinquency. The zine was distributed at live shows as well as made available by writing the band. A total of 9 issues were published.

"I think there was some discussion about what was written, but obviously, it was all Ian's writing," Green recalled. "I helped out with the layout on some pages, but it was Ian's baby, more than anything. It was all stuff [that band members] agreed with [...] and identified on."

== Live performances ==
The band was known for their extremely physical performances, during some of which Svenonius recalls breaking his arm, his leg, and breaking his head open on numerous occasions. Audience members were also hurt during performances. Svenonius described Nation of Ulysses performances as "an extraordinary freak-out kind of thing [...] really masochistic, lots of blood [...] cacophonous, and violent, and aggressive."

== Discography ==
=== Studio albums ===
- 13-Point Program to Destroy America (Dischord) (1991)
- Plays Pretty for Baby (Dischord) (1992)
- The Embassy Tapes (Dischord) (2000)

=== Studio EPs ===
- Nation of Ulysses (Dischord) (1991)
- The Birth of the Ulysses Aesthetic (the synthesis of speed and transformation) (Dischord) (1992)

== See also ==
- Washington, D.C., hardcore
