= Untouchable Sound =

Live album by The Make-Up
- Released: February 13, 2006
- Recorded: Black Cat, Washington, D.C.
- Genre: Gospel, post-punk, funk
- Length: 46:54
- Label: Drag City; Sea Note Records
- Producer: Brendan Canty

The Make-Up chronology
I Want Some (1999)	Untouchable Sound (2006)

Professional ratings
Review scores
Source	Rating
Allmusic	4/5 stars
Pitchfork Media	7.6/10

Untouchable Sound is the sixth album by The Make-Up. Released in 2006, six years after the band became inactive and six years before they would reunite for the first time, it is their second live album (although "live" sounds were added to the studio recordings of Destination: Love - Live! At Cold Rice). It is the band's only release to feature Alex Minoff on guitar. Track #11, "Wade in the Water," is a cover of a traditional African-American spiritual song of the same name.

== Track listing (LP) ==
1. "Intro" − 2:13
2. "Save Yourself" − 5:21
3. "Every Baby Cries the Same" − 4:14
4. "Hey! Orpheus"" − 2:30
5. "Call Me Mommy" − 2:53
6. "They Live by Night" − 4:07
7. "I am a Pentagon" − 3:29
8. "Prophet" − 3:03
9. "Bells" − 4:16
10. "Born on the Floor" − 3:14
11. "Wade in the Water" − 5:17
12. "White Belts" − 2:36
13. "C'mon, Let's Spawn" − 3:41
