= French Toast (band) =

American band

French Toast was an American band from Washington, D.C. that formed in 2001 and broke up in 2006. It began as a duo consisting of James Canty and Jerry Busher. They added a third member, Ben Gilligan, in 2005. Dischord's website has James Canty credited with guitar, vocals, keyboards and drums, and Jerry Busher is credited with bass, drums, vocals, and keyboards. However, all three members rotated instruments when the group was playing live. They released the Bugman EP in 2002 and the Hatred Mace single in 2003, both on Arrest Records. In 2005, they released their first LP, In A Cave, on Dischord Records. In 2006, they released their sophomore full-length album and first as a three-piece Ingleside Terrace, also through Dischord Records.

== Discography ==
- Ingleside Terrace LP (2006)
- In A Cave LP (2005)
- Hatred Mace Single (2003)
- Bugman EP (2002)
