= 13-Point Program to Destroy America =

Studio album by Nation of Ulysses
- Released: July 1, 1991
- Recorded: January 1991, Inner Ear, Arlington, Virginia
- Genre: Post-hardcore; hardcore punk
- Length: 39:06
- Label: Dischord
- Producer: Ian MacKaye

Nation of Ulysses chronology
13-Point Program to Destroy America (1991)	Plays Pretty for Baby (1992)

13-Point Program to Destroy America is the debut album by the American post-hardcore band Nation of Ulysses. The album's title is in reference to the Black Panther Party's Ten Point Program and J. Edgar Hoover's propaganda pamphlet "Red China's Secret Plan to Destroy America." The title of track No. 13 was inspired by Frank Sinatra's album Love Is a Kick.

Tracks 14–16 on the CD are not on the original album, and are taken from their 1991 self-titled 7" debut.

== Critical reception ==
Professional ratings
Review scores
Source	Rating
AllMusic	4.5/5 stars
The Encyclopedia of Popular Music	4/5 stars

Trouser Press wrote that "singer Ian Svenonius (who doubles on occasional bleating trumpet) has a deeper, throaty quality to his delivery than most DC-style barkers — not quite a Stax/Volt Rollins but a striking combination of ardor and menace that elevates his breathless rage above mere harangue." The Washington Post called the album "so brattily self-conscious that only the ferocity of its attack keeps it from curdling."

== Track listing ==
No.	Title	Length
1.	"Spectra Sonic Sound"	2:34
2.	"Look Out! Soul Is Back!"	1:38
3.	"Today I Met the Girl I'm Going to Marry"	1:47
4.	"Ulythium"	2:02
5.	"Cool Senior High School Fight"	1:40
6.	"A Kid Who Tells On Another Kid Is a Dead Kid"	1:43
7.	"Diphtheria"	4:15
8.	"Aspirin Kid"	5:13
9.	"Hot Chocolate City(Yeah!)"	1:43
10.	"P. Power"	1:47
11.	"You're My Miss Washington, D.C."	2:22
12.	"Target: U.S.A."	1:44
13.	"Love Is a Bull Market"	2:50
14.	"The Sound of Young America"	2:31
15.	"Channel One Ulysses"	3:22
16.	"Atom Bomb"	2:00
Total length:		31:25
