= I Want Some =

Compilation album by The Make-Up
- Released: March 23, 1999
- Genre: Gospel, post-punk, funk
- Length: 68:15
- Label: K

The Make-Up chronology
Save Yourself (1999)	I Want Some (1999)	Untouchable Sound - Live! (2006)

Professional ratings
Review scores
Source	Rating
Allmusic	4.5/5 stars

I Want Some is a compilation album by The Make-Up. I Want Some collects 23 of The Make-Up's singles and B-sides. It was released as a double LP, and as a CD version that included an 11-page booklet.

Track #20, "Wade in the Water," is a cover of a traditional African-American spiritual song of the same name.

== Track listing ==
1. "Pow! To the People" − 3:03
2. "I Want Some" − 2:43
3. "Walking on the Dune" − 3:34
4. "The Choice" − 3:33
5. "Born on the Floor" − 4:25
6. "Hey! Orpheus" − 2:28
7. "Grey Motorcycle" − 3:17
8. "Every Baby Cries the Same" − 4:20
9. "I am if..." − 4:00
10. "Little Black Book" − 3:46
11. "Blue Is Beautiful" − 3:36
12. "Trans-Pleasant Express" − 2:15
13. "Type-U Blood − 3:13
14. "We're Having a Baby" − 1:54
15. "This is ... Young Vulgarians" − 1:58
16. "R U A Believer" − 1:47
17. "Free Arthur Lee" − 3:02
18. "Untouchable Sound" − 1:56
19. "I Didn't Mean 2 Turn U On" − 2:29
20. "Wade in the Water" − 2:43
21. "Substance Abuse" − 2:30
22. "Under the Impression" − 2:37
23. "Have U Heard the Tapes?" − 3:06

== Sample ==
"I Want Some"
"I Want Some," the title track from I Want Some
