= Destination: Love – Live! at Cold Rice =

Destination: Love - Live! At Cold Rice

Studio album by the Make-Up
- Released: 1996
- Recorded: September 1995, Black Cat, Washington, D.C.
- Length: 37:25
- Label: Dischord
- Producer: Guy Picciotto

The Make-Up chronology
Destination: Love - Live! At Cold Rice (1996)	After Dark (1997)

Destination: Love - Live! At Cold Rice is the debut album by the American band the Make-Up.

On the LP version of the album, the A-Side is called the "Gospel Yeh-Yeh Side," and the B-Side the "Liberation Theology Side". On the CD version these sides were combined, but labeled separately in the liner notes.

A photograph of bassist Michelle Mae appears on the cover.

== Critical reception ==
Professional ratings
Review scores
Source	Rating
AllMusic	4.5/5 stars
The Virgin Encyclopedia of Nineties Music	3/5 stars

Rolling Stone called the album "an exultant mess o' high-tension twang and evangelistic howling that the Make-Up cheekily call 'gospel yeh-yeh'."

== Track listing (LP) ==
Gospel Yeh-Yeh Side (Side A)

1. "Intro: Hold It" − 1:38
2. "Here Comes the Judge" − 3:05
3. "You + I vs. the World" − 2:58
4. "They Live by Night" − 2:00
5. "Bring the Birds Down" − 2:25
6. "Don't Mind the Mind" − 2:06
7. "Evidence Is Everywhere" − 2:11
8. "We Can't Be Contained" − 3:22

Liberation Theology Side (Side B)

1. "Introductions" − 1:23
2. "Don't Step on the Children" − 2:00
3. "How Pretty Can U Get?" − 2:02
4. "R U a Believer Pt. II" − 2:04
5. "International Airport" − 2:29
6. "We Gotta Get Off This Rock" − 1:46
7. "So ... Chocolatey/Destination: Love" − 4:38
8. "Outro: Hold It" − 1:18
