= Illuminated by the Light =

Studio album by Weird War
- Released: April 19, 2005
- Genre: Indie rock
- Label: Drag City

Weird War chronology
If You Can't Beat 'Em, Bite 'Em (2004)	Illuminated by the Light (2005)

Professional ratings
Review scores
Source	Rating
Allmusic	3.5/5 stars
Pitchfork Media	7.3/10 stars
The Guardian	3/5 stars

Illuminated by the Light is the fourth album by Weird War, said to be their best.

When asked about the album's title, Svenonius has responded "Illuminated By The Light just means lit by the light. It’s like being fed by the food."

== Track listing ==
1. "Illuminated" − 3:42
2. "Mental Poisoning" − 4:04
3. "Girls Like That" − 4:45
4. "See About Me" − 3:51
5. "Crystal Healing" − 4:07
6. "A Visit to the Cave" − 1:17
7. "Word on the Street" − 3:36
8. "Earth, Mama, Woman, Girl, Child" − 3:16
9. "Motorcycle Mongoloid" − 5:36
10. "Destination: Dogfood" − 4:33
11. "Put It in Your Pocket" − 6:06
