= If You Can't Beat 'Em, Bite 'Em =

If You Can't Beat 'em, Bite 'em

Studio album by Weird War
- Released: January 27, 2004
- Genre: Indie rock
- Label: Drag City

Weird War chronology
I Suck on that Emotion (as Scene Creamers) (2003)	If You Can't Beat 'em, Bite 'em (2004)	Illuminated by the Light (2005)

Professional ratings
Review scores
Source	Rating
AllMusic	3/5 stars
Pitchfork Media	(6.2/10)

If You Can't Beat 'Em, Bite 'Em is the third album by Weird War.

== Track listing ==
1. "Intro (Music for Masturbation)" − 1:42
2. "Grand Fraud" − 3:24
3. "Tess" − 3:00
4. "If You Can't Beat 'Em, Bite 'Em" − 3:58
  - vocals by Jennifer Herrema (as "JJ Rox")
5. "Moment in Time" − 4:38
6. "Store Bought Pot" − 4:22
7. "AK-47" − 3:43
8. "N.D.S.P." − 4:34
9. "Chemical Rank" − 3:39
10. "Lickin' Stick" − 3:43
  - piano by Azita
11. "One by One" − 4:18
