= Sound Verite =

Studio album by The Make-Up
- Released: February 7, 1997
- Recorded: Dub Narcotic Studio, Washington, D.C.
- Genre: Gospel, post-punk, funk
- Length: 30:50
- Label: K
- Producer: Calvin Johnson

The Make-Up chronology
After Dark (1997)	Sound Verite (1997)	In Mass Mind (1998)

Professional ratings
Review scores
Source	Rating
AllMusic	4/5 stars
NME	8/10

Sound Verite is an album by the Make-Up, released in 1997.

The album's cover appears to be an homage to the cover of Love's Forever Changes, a band to which the Make-Up were often compared.

== Critical reception ==
The Washington Post wrote that "at its most scrappy, the album sounds like an intentionally amateurish British punk band (early Alternative Television, say) trying to be (the artist formerly known as) Prince." Spin praised the "groovy, dance-friendly vibe." The Guardian thought that the band's "biggest asset, [Ian] Svenonius, sings like he's moments away from death by choking, possibly on a copy of Socialist Worker." Writing in the NME, Mike Bloomberg said that "even if they are faking it, it's easily enough to make you drop to your knees."

== Track listing ==
1. "If They Come in the Morning" – 5:53
2. "Make Up Is Lies" – 2:03
3. "At the Tone, the Time Will Be" – 2:46
4. "Tell it Like it Will Be" – 3:15
5. "What's the Rumpus?" – 2:07
6. "Gospel 2000" − 3:08
7. "Hot Coals" – 2:06
8. "Gold Record Pt. I" – 4:02
9. "Gold Record Pt. II" – 3:09
10. "Have U Got the New Look?" – 2:55
