= In Mass Mind =

Studio album by The Make-Up
- Released: April 7, 1998
- Recorded: February 1997, Stillness Studio, Washington, D.C.
- Genre: Gospel, post-punk, funk
- Length: 40:13
- Label: Dischord; Black Gemini
- Producer: Royal Trux (credited as "Adam & Eve")

The Make-Up chronology
| Sound Verite (1997) | In Mass Mind (1998) | Save Yourself (1999) |

Professional ratings
Review scores
| Source | Rating |
|---|---|
| AllMusic | 4.5/5 stars |
| Robert Christgau | (dud) |
| The Encyclopedia of Popular Music | 3/5 stars |

In Mass Mind is an album by The Make-Up, released in 1998.

All tracks were written and composed by The Make-Up, except for tracks #1, #13, and #14. "Black Wire Pt. 1" and "Black Wire Pt. 2" are attributed as inspired by the MC5. "Caught up in the Rapture" is attributed to Neil Hagerty (of Royal Trux, who produced and engineered the album) and Dianne Quander, credited with the arrangement and lyrics, respectively. "Caught up in the Rapture" is a cover of an Anita Baker song from her 1986 album Rapture, of which Dianne Quander is attributed as co-writer/composer with Garry Glenn.

== Critical reception ==
The A.V. Club wrote that "Ian Svenonius makes like a garage-funk Pied Piper on In Mass Mind, the deepest and most satisfying of The Make-Up’s albums." CMJ New Music Monthly wrote that James Canty "coaxes an impressive range of sounds from his guitar, from fuzzed-out psychedelia to ringing single notes recalling surf and Booker T.-style funk."

== Track listing ==
1. "Black Wire Pt. 1" − 1:03
2. "Live in the Rhythm Hive" − 3:02
3. "Joy of Sound" − 3:38
4. "Watch it with that Thing" − 4:21
5. "Drop the Needle" − 2:17
6. "Earth Worm Pt. 1" − 2:03
7. "Do You Like Gospel Music?" − 3:59
8. "Come Up to the Microphone" − 2:50
9. "Centre of the Earth" − 2:59
10. "(I've Heard About) Saturday Nite" − 3:05
11. "Earth Worm Pt. 2" − 2:25
12. "Time Machine" − 2:38
13. "Caught Up in the Rapture" − 4:41
14. "Black Wire Pt. 2" − 2:02
