= After Dark (The Make-Up album) =

Live album by The Make-Up
- Released: February 3, 1997
- Recorded: April 1996, Fine China, London
- Genre: Gospel, post-punk, funk
- Length: 40:45
- Label: Dischord
- Producer: Ian MacKaye

The Make-Up chronology
Destination: Love – Live! At Cold Rice (1996)	After Dark (1997)	Sound Verite (1997)

Professional ratings
Review scores
Source	Rating
Allmusic	3/5 stars
NME	8/10

After Dark is the first live album by The Make-Up. It was recorded at The Garage, Highbury, London. Their first one Destination: Love - Live! At Cold Rice was recorded within a studio setting, it was done so with an eye towards spontaneity and improvisation. "Live" sounds were later mixed into the studio recording to reflect this.

"Warning" on the inner sleeve of the LP version of After Dark.

== Track listing ==
1. "Spoken Intro" − 0:36
2. "Prelude to Comedown/Can I Hear U Say 'Yea' " − 6:14
3. "Blue Is Beautiful" − 2:40
4. "At the Tone ... (The Time Will Be)" − 2:44
5. "We Can't Be Contained" − 7:25
6. "Gospel 2000" − 3:08
7. "Vs. Culture" − 1:52
8. "We're Having a Baby" − 2:19
9. "Make Up Is: Lies" − 1:57
10. "R U A Believer" − 1:44
11. "Final Comedown" − 1:42
12. "Don't Mind the Mind" − 4:50
13. "(Here Comes) The Judge" − 3:34
