= James Canty =

American musician

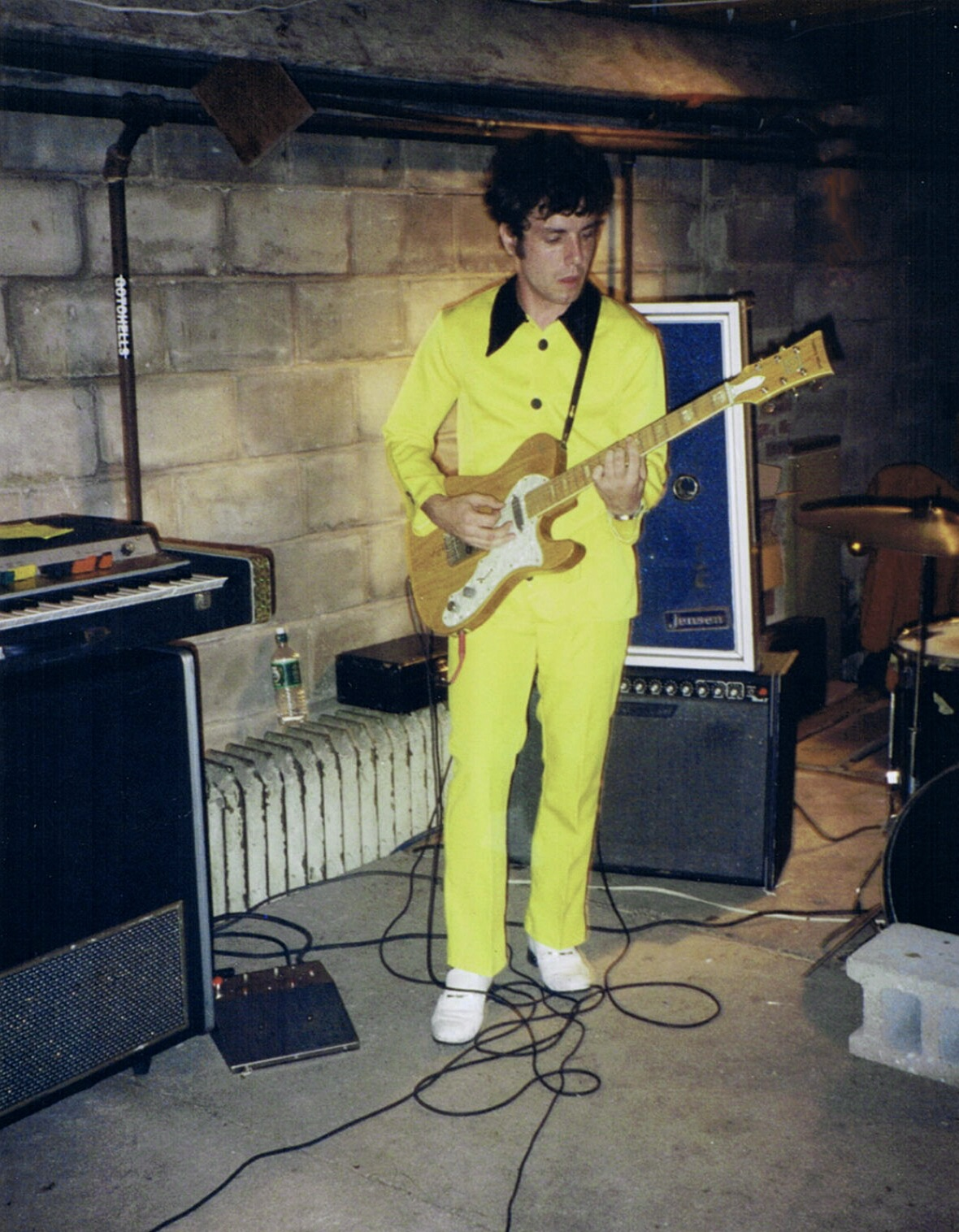
Canty performing with The Make-Up in 1996

James Canty is a Brooklyn, New York–based multi-instrumentalist musician from Washington, D.C.

Canty is currently known for playing guitar in the band Ted Leo and the Pharmacists, and guitar and keyboard with The Make-Up. Before forming The Make-Up, Canty was the drummer for Nation of Ulysses, a political punk band that existed from 1987 to 1992. Other groups Canty has played in include French Toast, All Scars, Georgie James, Cupid Car Club, Ideal Forms, Chain & The Gang, Kid Congo Powers & The Pink Monkey Birds, and Dust Galaxy.

Most of Canty's work has been with the bands signed to Dischord Records; however, he has also released music with K Records, Lookout Records, Kill Rock Stars, Matador Records and Drag City.

Canty is the younger brother of Fugazi drummer Brendan Canty and writer Kevin Canty.

In 2008, Canty recorded a digital EP called Rapid Response with Ted Leo and the Pharmacists. The EP was created as a benefit for Democracy Now! and the Minneapolis chapter of Food Not Bombs, in response to police brutality during the 2008 Republican National Convention.

In 2014, Canty became the fill-in keyboardist for the television show Late Night with Seth Meyers.
