= Weird War =

American indie rock band

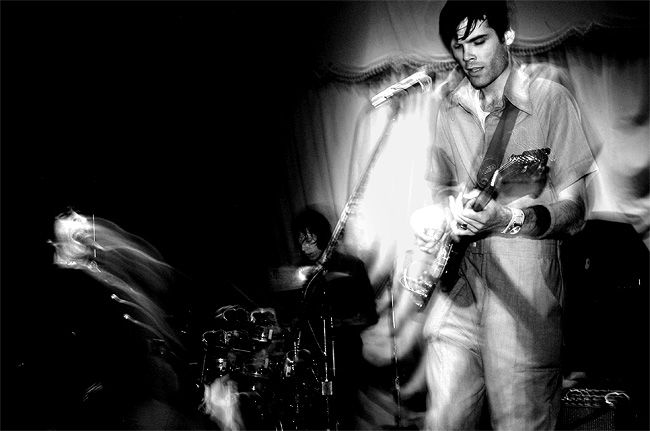
- Weird War performing at the historic Southgate House in Newport, KY

Background information
- Also known as: Scene Creamers
- Origin: Washington, D.C.
- Genres: Indie rock
- Years active: 2001–present
- Label: Drag City
- Members: Ian Svenonius; Michelle Mae; Alex Minoff; Sebastian Thomson
- Past members: Neil Hagerty; Jessica Espeleta; Steve McCarty; Blake Brunner
- Website: Official website

Weird War, briefly known as Scene Creamers, is an indie rock band based out of Washington, D.C. The current lineup consists of Ian Svenonius on vocals, Michelle Mae on bass guitar, Alex Minoff on guitar, and Sebastian Thomson on drums.

Weird War was initially formed as an umbrella organization in 2001 to encompass disparate anti-authoritarian groups and to "challenge the idiocy of the new epoch." While the current lineup appears on the group's first release I'll Never Forget What's His Name, the group's first full length, self-titled release featured Neil Hagerty (of Royal Trux) and Jessica Espeleta (formerly of Love as Laughter) on guitars, and Steve McCarty (later of Dead Meadow) on drums.

These collaborators soon left to pursue other programs, and the band became known as The Scene Creamers, with Ian Svenonius on vocals, Michelle Mae on bass, Alex Minoff (of Golden) on guitar, and Blake Brunner on drums. In this incarnation, the band released I Suck on that Emotion, through Drag City.

After being threatened with a legal suit for the name Scene Creamers by a French graffiti artist collective of the same name, the band reverted to the name Weird War. Since then, its membership has become static, with the addition of Argentine Sebastian Thomson (of the group Trans Am) on drums, and its intent has become more cosmic.

== Ideology ==
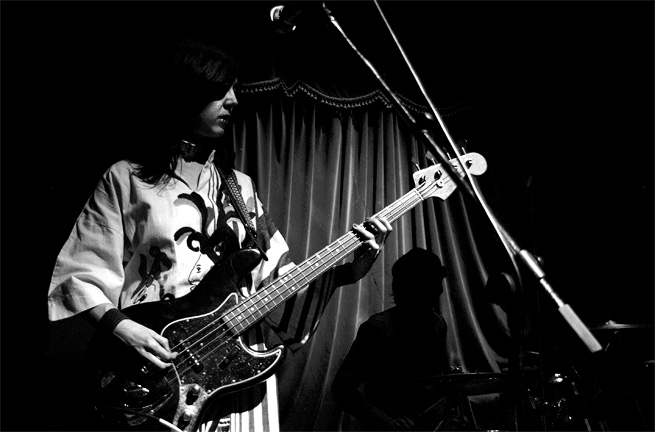
Weird War performing at the historic Southgate House in Newport, KY. Photo by Josh Rhinehart.

Weird War claims that they are "the sole answer to the hype-based careerism, empty formalism and vacuity which has infected what was once a genuinely creative underground rock 'n' roll scene."

Such rhetoric however is not necessarily mirrored by the group's lyrical content. Svenonius told an interviewer "I don't actually like rock and roll lyrics that are political because lyrics are almost irrelevant in rock and roll. What lyrics are is just an incantation, a kind of spell. A political band isn't a band with political lyrics. A political band is a group that's creating a narrative that guides the culture towards, well, towards destroying the ruling class, in whatever way."

In comparison to their own music, Weird War often reference a cookie-cutter aesthetic of other bands and musicians as neo-conservative political forces: "Weird War see the clone nature of the revisionist groups as a direct analogue to the fascism and conformity which defines 21st century America, and their general idiocy an infiltration conspiracy by counter-intelligence forces."

According to Svenonius, Weird War's brief stint as The Scene Creamers was as a result of politically motivated, collective-dream:

We were on tour and we went to a hotel one night. In that hotel we had a dream. It was a collective dream. In that dream we knew how to read. We started to read a book which featured the artist Salvador Dali. In the book, he theorized that Adolf Hitler, the famous dictator, was just acting a Wagnerian obsession. Dali thought Hitler loved opera so much, that he wanted to die heroically, in a German way. And when we awoke we were filled with hope. Because we realized that if we could construct a narrative. If we rock and roll people could make a narrative that was similarly made, we could drive our own president to kill himself in his own bunker. He could take a little cyanide pill sewn into his suit jacket. That is what our music is all about.

Songs like "AK-47" address "the technology gap which faces modern Anti-colonial guerilla [sic] fighters" and that similar songs "could be called a celebration of nationalist resistance movements worldwide which fight Anglo-American imperialism."

== Discography ==
=== Studio albums ===
- Weird War (Drag City) (2002)
- I Suck on that Emotion (as Scene Creamers) (Drag City) (2003)
- If You Can't Beat 'Em, Bite 'Em (Drag City) (2004)
- Illuminated by the Light (Drag City) (2005)

=== DVD / Video ===
- appears on Burn to Shine 01: Washington DC 01.14.2004 (Trixie) (2005)

=== 7 inch singles ===
"AK-47"
Distributed by:	Drag City Records (DCR No. 256)
Released:	September 19, 2003
Other information:	Released under the name "Scene Creamers."; Backed with "Luv Wuz..."

=== Appearances on compilations ===
Year	Title	Track(s)	Label	Other
2002	Colonel Jeffrey Pumpernickel - A Concept Album	"I'll Never Forget What's His Name"	Off Records	
2003	No Disco - Mutant Dance Happening	"AK-47"	S.H.A.D.O. Records	
2005	Drag City A to Z	"Girls Like That"	Drag City Records	
2005	Burn to Shine 01: Washington DC 01.14.2004 (DVD)	Performance of "AK-47"	Trixie DVD	Ex-Nation of Ulysses, Make-Up, and Cupid Car Club member James Canty also appears as part of French Toast.
2006	Pancake Mountain (TV) (Episodes 5 & 6)	Performance of "Girls Like That"	Monkey Boy Studios	Washington, D.C.–based Public-access television cable TV children's show featuring performances by many indie rock bands.

=== DVD / Video ===
Las Historias mas Sexy Mundo! (DVD)
Distributed by:	Planaria
Released:	2005
Other information:	Satiric short based on mid-70’s European softcore porn films. Stars Weird War (as Scene Creamers) and other Washington D.C. musicians.

=== Comics ===
Las Historias mas Sexy Mundo! (comic)
Distributed by:	Planaria (Plan No. 23)
Released:	2005
Other information:	Pulp comic version of film by the same name. Satiric comic based on Mexican pulp comics. Stars Weird War (as Scene Creamers) and other Washington D.C. musicians.
