= 2025 deaths in the United States (April–June) =

- Decades: 2000s; 2010s; 2020s; 2030s
- See also: History of the United States (2016–present); Timeline of United States history (2010–present); List of years in the United States

The following notable deaths in the United States occurred in April–June 2025. Names are reported under the date of death, in alphabetical order as set out in WP:NAMESORT. A typical entry reports information in the following sequence: Name, age, country of citizenship at birth and subsequent nationality (if applicable), what subject was noted for, year of birth (if known), and reference.

== April ==
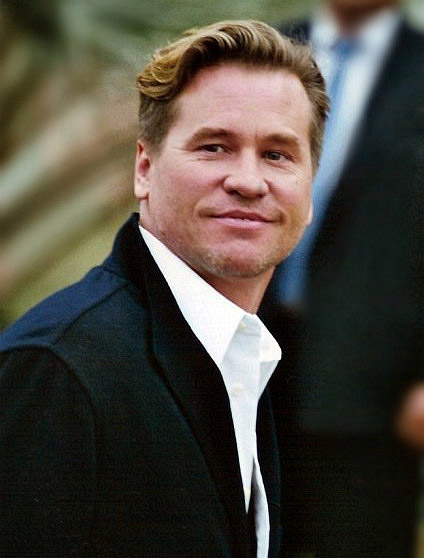
Val Kilmer

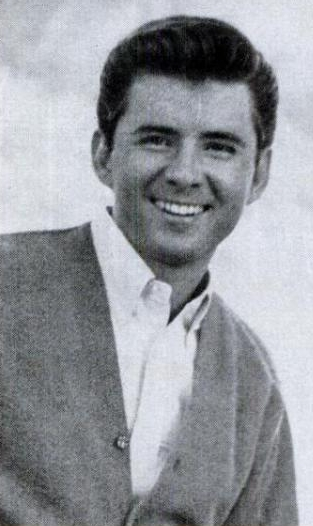
Johnny Tillotson

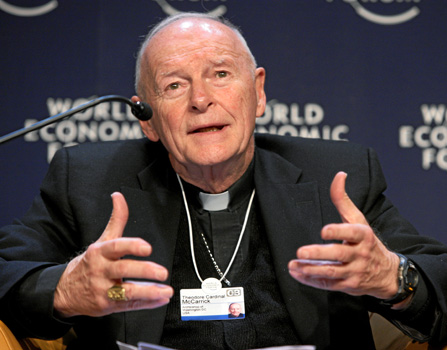
Theodore McCarrick

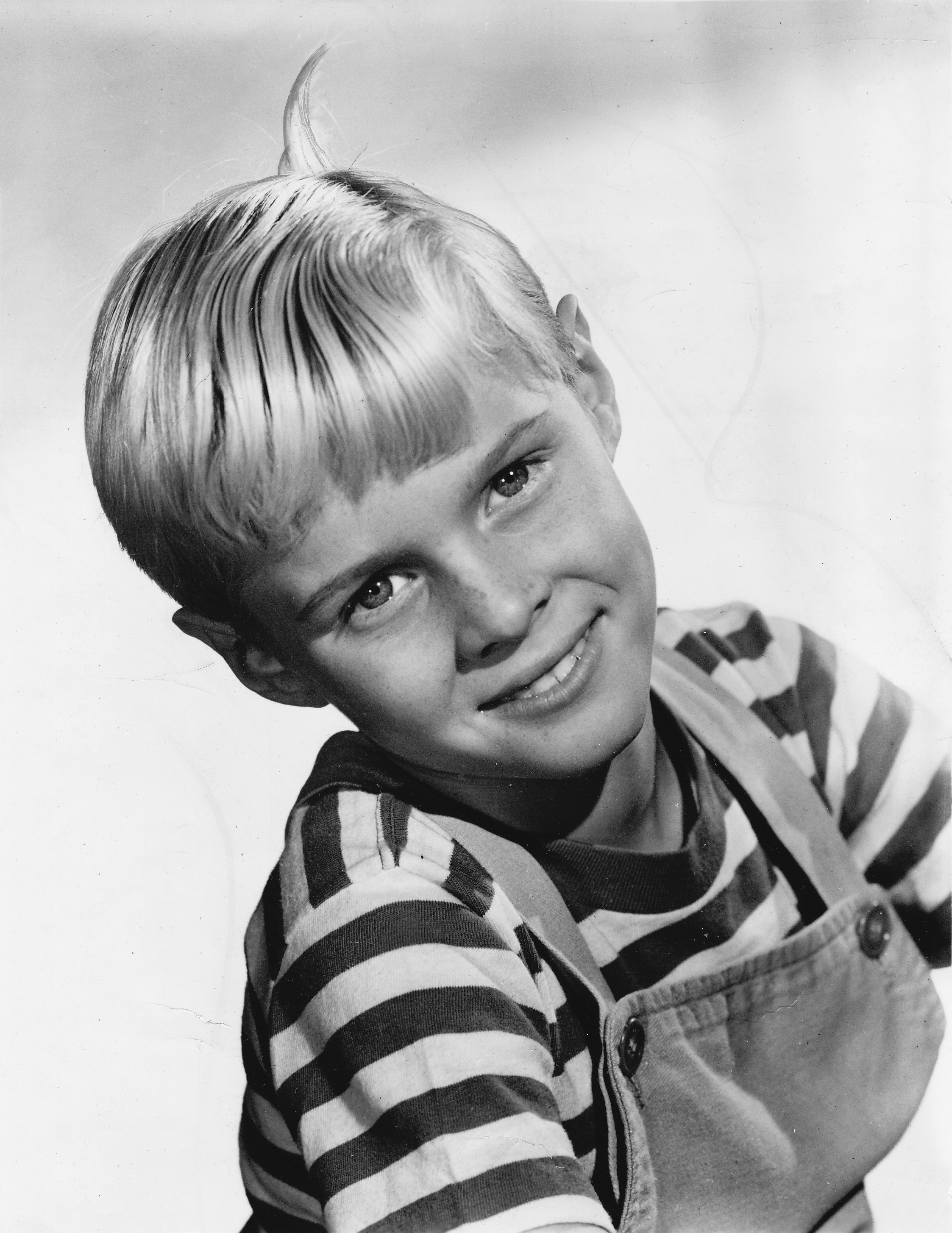
Jay North

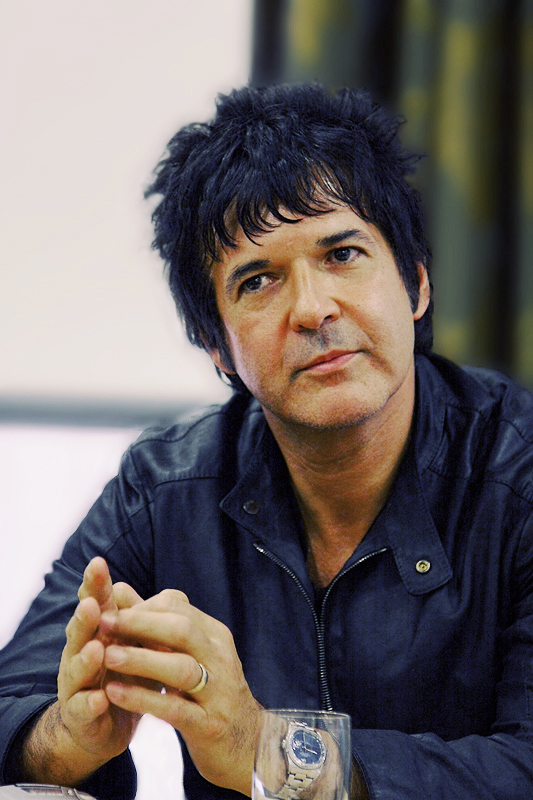
Clem Burke

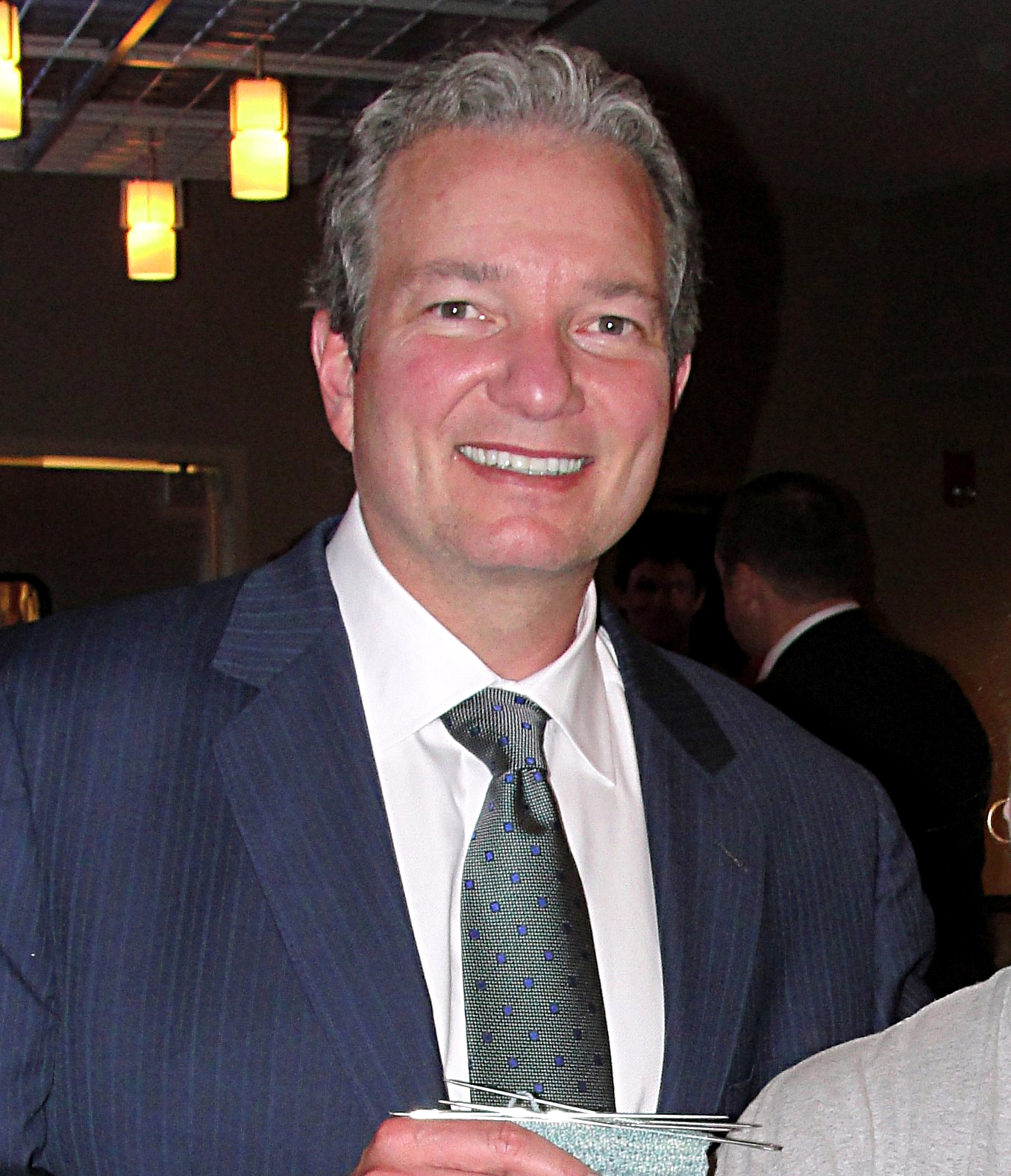
Ray Shero

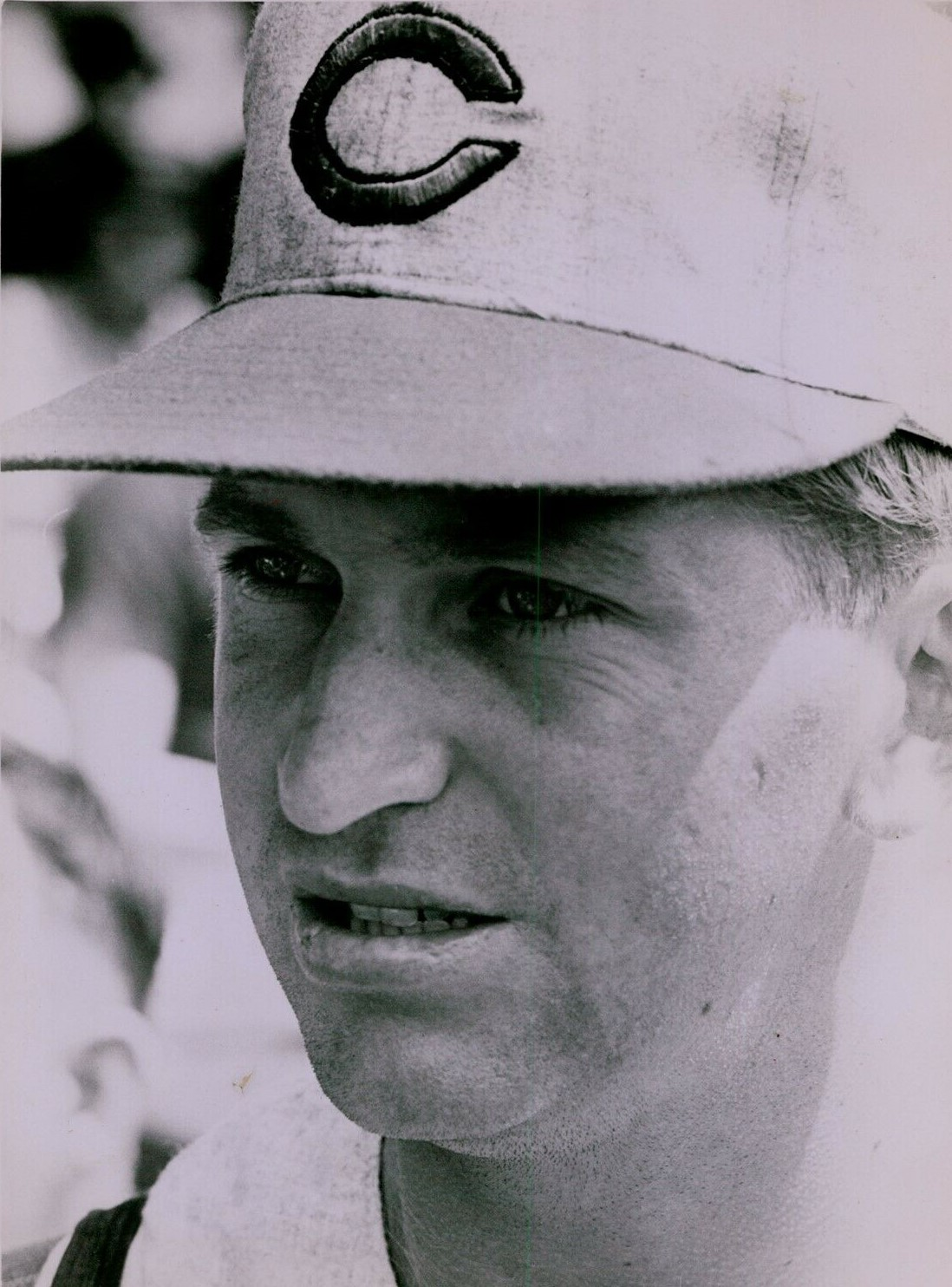
Tommy Helms

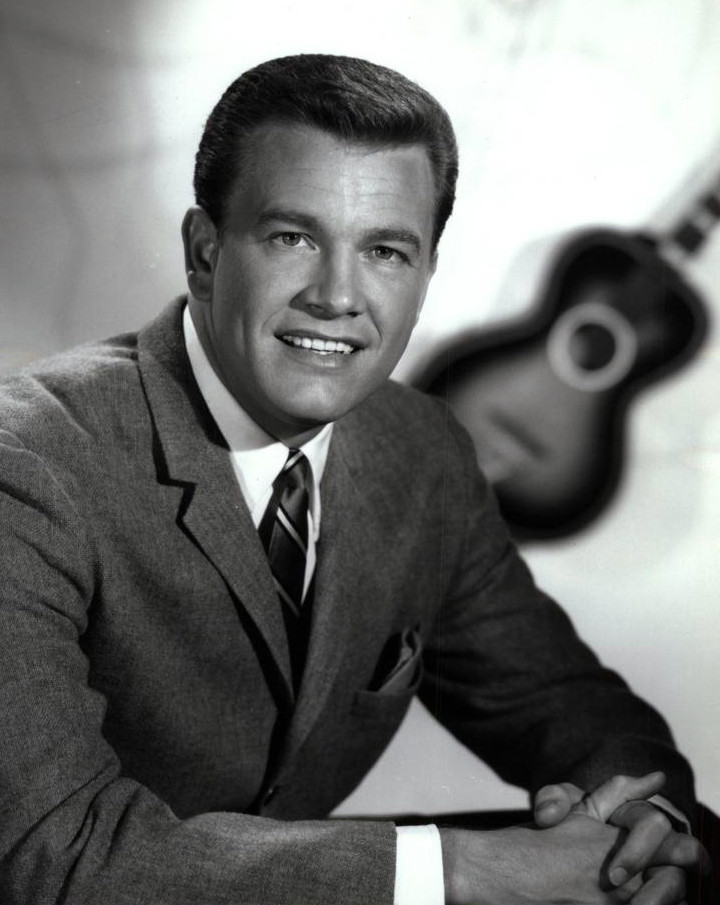
Wink Martindale

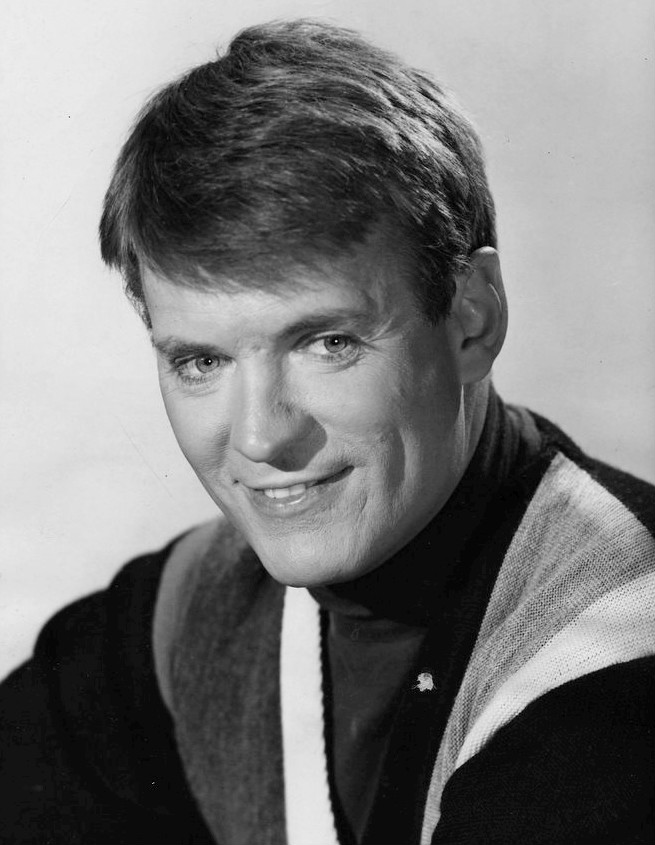
Will Hutchins

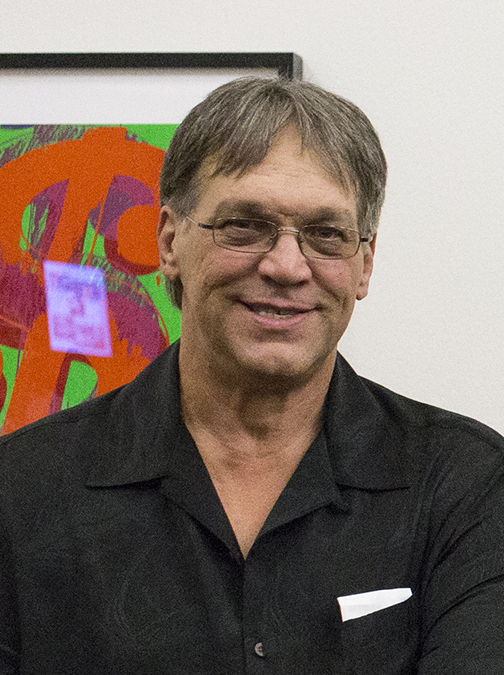
Steve McMichael

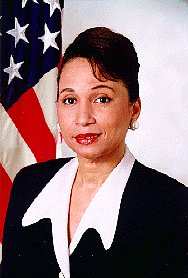
Alexis Herman

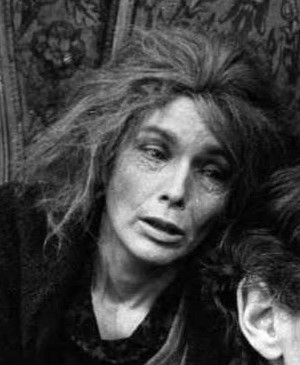
Priscilla Pointer

- April 1
  - George Freeman, 97, jazz guitarist (Birth Sign, New Improved Funk, Man & Woman) (b. 1927)
  - Wayne Handy, 89, rock and roll singer (b. 1935)
  - Michael Hurley, 83, folk singer-songwriter (Have Moicy!, Snockgrass, Watertower) (b. 1941)
  - Stanley O. Ikenberry, 90, academic, president of the University of Illinois System (1979–1995, 2010) (b. 1935)
  - Dean T. Kashiwagi, 72, business theorist (b. 1952)
  - Val Kilmer, 65, actor (Batman Forever, The Prince of Egypt, The Doors) (b. 1959)
  - M. Hasna Maznavi, 39, writer, director and activist, founder of the Women's Mosque of America (b. 1985)
  - Nancy Huddleston Packer, 99, writer (b. 1925)
  - Dave Täht, 59, network engineer (b. 1965)
  - Johnny Tillotson, 86, singer-songwriter ("Poetry in Motion") (b. 1938)
- April 2
  - Bill Cottrell, 80, football player (Detroit Lions, Denver Broncos) (b. 1944) (death announced on this date)
  - Austin Metcalf, 17, high school student (b. 2007)
  - Franklin Stahl, 95, molecular biologist and geneticist (b. 1929)
  - John Vella, 74, football player (Oakland Raiders, Minnesota Vikings) (b. 1950) (death announced on this date)
  - Greg Zito, 72, politician, member of the Illinois Senate (1983–1991) and House of Representatives (1981–1983) (b. 1953)
- April 3
  - Floyd Clack, 84, politician, member of the Michigan House of Representatives (1983–1996) (b. 1940)
  - Michael Hurley, 83, folk singer-songwriter (b. 1941) (death announced on this date)
  - Jesse Kornbluth, 79, journalist and author (b. 1936)
  - Theodore McCarrick, 94, Roman Catholic cardinal, archbishop of Newark (1986–2000) and Washington (2001–2006) (b. 1930)
  - Dean Wells, 54, football player (Seattle Seahawks, Carolina Panthers) (b. 1970)
- April 4
  - Jim Brandenburg, 79, environmentalist and wildlife photographer (b. 1945)
  - Paul Fierlinger, 89, Czech-born animator and director (Teeny Little Super Guy, My Dog Tulip) (b. 1936)
  - Ray Seals, 59, football player (Tampa Bay Buccaneers, Pittsburgh Steelers, Carolina Panthers) (b. 1965) (death announced on this date)
  - Gene Ward, 82, politician, member of the Hawaii House of Representatives (1990–1998, 2006–2025) (b. 1943)
- April 5
  - Cedric Dempsey, 92, sports administrator, executive director of the National Collegiate Athletic Association (1994–2003) (b. 1932)
  - Philip W. Johnston, 80, politician, member of the Massachusetts House of Representatives (1975–1979) and Senate (1979–1989) (b. 1944)
  - David A. Siegel, 89, businessman, founder and CEO of Westgate Resorts (b. 1935)
  - Carl Warwick, 88, baseball player (St. Louis Cardinals, Houston Colt .45s, Baltimore Orioles), World Series champion (1964) (b. 1937)
- April 6
  - Al Barile, 63, guitarist (SSD) (b. 1961/1962)
  - Jay North, 73, actor (Dennis the Menace, Zebra in the Kitchen, Maya) (b. 1951)
- April 7
  - Clem Burke, 70, Hall of Fame drummer (Blondie) (b. 1954)
  - William Finn, 73, composer and lyricist (b. 1952)
  - Joey D. Vieira, 80, actor (Lassie, Ferris Bueller's Day Off, Red Heat) (b. 1944)
- April 8
  - Nicky Katt, 54, actor (Dazed and Confused, Boston Public, Boiler Room) (b. 1970)
  - Lenny Welch, 86, singer ("You Don't Know Me", "Since I Fell for You", "Two Different Worlds") (b. 1938)
- April 9
  - Mel Novak, 90, actor (Game of Death, Black Belt Jones, An Eye for an Eye) (b. 1934)
  - Ray Shero, 62, ice hockey executive (Pittsburgh Penguins, New Jersey Devils), Stanley Cup champion (2009) (b. 1962)
- April 10
  - Mario Ernesto Sánchez, 78, Cuban-born actor (Miami Vice, The Specialist) and businessman, founder and director of Teatro Avante (b. 1947)
  - Nino Tempo, 90, singer (Nino Tempo & April Stevens, "Deep Purple") and saxophonist (The Wrecking Crew) (b. 1935)
  - Drew Zingg, 68, guitarist (b. 1957) (death announced on this date)
- April 11
  - John LaFalce, 85, politician, member of the U.S. House of Representatives (1975–2003), New York Senate (1971–1972), and State Assembly (1973–1974) (b. 1939)
  - Mikal Mahdi, 42, convicted spree killer (b. 1983)
  - Don Mischer, 85, television producer (b. 1940)
  - Gretchen Dow Simpson, 85, painter (b. 1939)
- April 12
  - Kyren Lacy, 24, football player (LSU Tigers, Louisiana Ragin’ Cajuns) (b. 2000)
  - Julian L. McPhillips, 78, attorney and politician (b. 1946)
  - Andrea Blaugrund Nevins, 63, film director (The Other F Word) (b. 1962)
  - Mary Zoghby, 91, politician, member of the Alabama Legislature (1978–1994) (b. 1933)
- April 13
  - Richard Armitage, 79, diplomat and government official, deputy secretary of state (2001–2005) (b. 1945)
  - Bruce Caldwell, 77, Episcopal bishop (b. 1947)
  - Bob Garretson, 92, racing driver (World Sportscar Championship, IMSA GT Championship) (b. 1933)
  - Charles A. Hartke, 80, politician, member of the Illinois House of Representatives (1985–2003) (b. 1944)
  - Tommy Helms, 83, baseball player (Cincinnati Reds, Houston Astros) (b. 1941)
- April 14
  - Joseph Csatari, 96, artist (b. 1929)
  - Francis Davis, 78, author and journalist (The Village Voice, The Atlantic Monthly) (b. 1946)
  - Larry Donovan, 84, football coach (Montana Grizzlies, BC Lions) (b. 1941) (death announced on this date)
  - Don Hasselbeck, 70, football player (New England Patriots, Los Angeles Raiders, Minnesota Vikings), Super Bowl champion (1984) (b. 1955)
  - Jed the Fish, 69, radio DJ (KROQ) (b. 1955)
  - Bill Oliver, 85, football coach (Alabama Crimson Tide, Chattanooga Mocs, Auburn Tigers) (b. 1939)
  - Jan Shipps, 95, historian (Latter Day Saint movement) (b. 1929)
  - Elaine Wynn, 82, businesswoman (Wynn Resorts, Mirage Resorts) (b. 1942)
- April 15
  - Patrick Adiarte, 82, Filipino-born actor (The King and I, High Time, Flower Drum Song) (b. 1942)
  - Richard K. Bernstein, 90, physician (b. 1934)
  - Mike DeBord, 69, football coach (Michigan Wolverines, Central Michigan Chippewas, Chicago Bears) (b. 1956)
  - Karen Durbin, 80, journalist (b. 1944)
  - Wink Martindale, 91, disc jockey, game show host (Gambit, Tic-Tac-Dough) and singer ("Deck of Cards") (b. 1933)
  - Billy Montgomery, 87, politician, member of the Louisiana House of Representatives (1988–2008) (b. 1937)
  - Bill Morrisette, 93, politician, member of the Oregon Senate (2003–2010) and House of Representatives (1999–2002), mayor of Springfield, Oregon (1989–1999) (b. 1931)
  - John L. Ray, 81, politician, member of the Council of the District of Columbia (1979–1997) (b. 1943) (death announced on this date)
- April 16
  - Dwayne Collins, 37, basketball player (Miami Hurricanes, Phoenix Suns) (b. 1988)
  - Mac Gayden, 83, rock/country singer-songwriter and guitarist (b. 1941)
  - Joanne Gilbert, 92, actress (The Great Man, Ride Out for Revenge, The High Cost of Loving) (b. 1932)
  - Joel Krosnick, 84, cellist (b. 1941) (death announced on this date)
- April 17
  - Ita Aber, 93, multimedia textile artist and art curator (b. 1932)
  - Chuck Ferries, 85, Olympic alpine skier (1960, 1964) (b. 1939)
- April 18
  - Ray Baughman, 82, chemist and nanotechnologist (b. 1943)
  - Mike Chase, 73, stock car racing driver (NASCAR Winston West Series) (b. 1952)
  - Harry T. Lemmon, 94, judge (b. 1930)
  - George McMillan, 81, politician, Lieutenant Governor of Alabama (1979–1983) (b. 1943)
- April 19
  - Ron Hood, 55, politician, member of the Ohio House of Representatives (1995–2000, 2005–2006, 2013–2020) (b. 1969)
  - Alan Harris Nevas, 97, jurist and politician, judge of the U.S. District Court for Connecticut (1985–2009) and member of the Connecticut House of Representatives (1971–1977) (b. 1928)
  - Bill Ramos, 69, politician, member of the Washington House of Representatives (2019–2025) and State Senate (since 2025) (b. 1956)
  - Jay Sigel, 81, golfer (b. 1943)
  - Aaron Woods, 75, politician, member of the Oregon Senate (since 2023) (b. 1950)
- April 20
  - Mike Patrick, 80, sportscaster (ESPN) (b. 1944)
- April 21
  - Herbert J. Gans, 97, German-born sociologist (b. 1927)
  - Will Hutchins, 94, actor (Sugarfoot) (b. 1930)
  - Dominick J. Ruggerio, 76, politician, member (since 1985) and president (since 2017) of the Rhode Island Senate, member of the Rhode Island House of Representatives (1981–1985) (b. 1948)
  - Ed Smylie, 95, aerospace engineer (Apollo 13) (b. 1929)
- April 22
  - David Briggs, 82, country keyboardist (b. 1943)
  - Lar Park Lincoln, 63, actress (Knots Landing, Friday the 13th Part VII: The New Blood) and author (b. 1961)
  - Chito Martínez, 59, Belizean-born baseball player (Baltimore Orioles) (b. 1965) (death announced on this date)
- April 23
  - Tom Brown, 84, football (Green Bay Packers, Washington Redskins) and baseball player (Washington Senators) (b. 1940)
  - Steve McMichael, 67, Hall of Fame football player (New England Patriots, Chicago Bears) and wrestler (b. 1957)
  - Lulu Roman, 78, comedian (Hee Haw) and singer (b. 1946)
  - David Thomas, 71, rock singer-songwriter (Pere Ubu) (b. 1953)
- April 24
  - Rob Holland, 50, aerobatic pilot (b. 1974)
  - Jack Katz, 97, comic book artist (b. 1927)
  - Steve Kiner, 77, Hall of Fame football player (Dallas Cowboys, New England Patriots, Houston Oilers) (b. 1947)
  - Peter McIan, record producer (Business as Usual, Cargo), musician (The City), and songwriter. (death announced on this date)
- April 25
  - Paul A. Batiste, 75, jazz musician (Batiste family) and educator (b. 1949/1950)
  - Virginia Giuffre, 41, American-Australian justice advocate (b. 1983)
  - Alexis Herman, 77, political figure and social worker, secretary of labor (1997–2001) (b. 1947)
  - Walt Jocketty, 74, baseball executive (St. Louis Cardinals, Cincinnati Reds) (b. 1951)
  - J. C. Snead, 84, golfer (b. 1940)
- April 26
  - Andy Bey, 85, jazz singer and pianist (b. 1939)
- April 27
  - Dick Barnett, 88, basketball player (New York Knicks, Los Angeles Lakers, Syracuse Nationals), NBA Champion (1970, 1973) (b. 1936)
  - Jiggly Caliente, 44, Filipino-born drag performer (RuPaul's Drag Race, Drag Race Philippines) and actress (Pose) (b. 1980)
  - Cora Sue Collins, 98, actress (The Adventures of Tom Sawyer, All This, and Heaven Too, Youth on Trial) (b. 1927)
  - Stan Love, 76, basketball player (Baltimore Bullets, Los Angeles Lakers, San Antonio Spurs) (b. 1949) (death announced on this date)
- April 28
  - Juana Gutierrez, 93, Mexican-born political activist (b. 1931/1932)
  - Andrew Karpen, 59, independent film studio executive (Bleecker Street, Focus Features) (b. 1966)
  - Ed Pink, 94, drag racing engine builder (b. 1931) (death announced on this date)
  - Priscilla Pointer, 100, actress (Carrie, Dallas, Blue Velvet) (b. 1924)
  - Lupe Sanchez, 63, football player (Pittsburgh Steelers) (b. 1961)
  - Stanley Girard Schlarman, 91, Roman Catholic prelate, bishop of Dodge City (1983–1998) and auxiliary bishop of Belleville (1979–1983) (b. 1933)
- April 29
  - Roy Cooper, 69, rodeo cowboy (b. 1955)
  - David Horowitz, 86, writer and activist, founder of the David Horowitz Freedom Center (b. 1939)
- April 30
  - Susan Holmes, 82, politician, member of the Georgia House of Representatives (2011–2023) and mayor of Monticello (1998–2010) (b. 1942)
  - Thomas M. T. Niles, 85, diplomat, ambassador to Canada (1985–1989), the European Union (1989–1991), and Greece (1993–1997) (b. 1939)
  - Jeff Sperbeck, 62, sports agent (b. 1963)
  - Joe Louis Walker, 75, musician (b. 1949)

== May ==
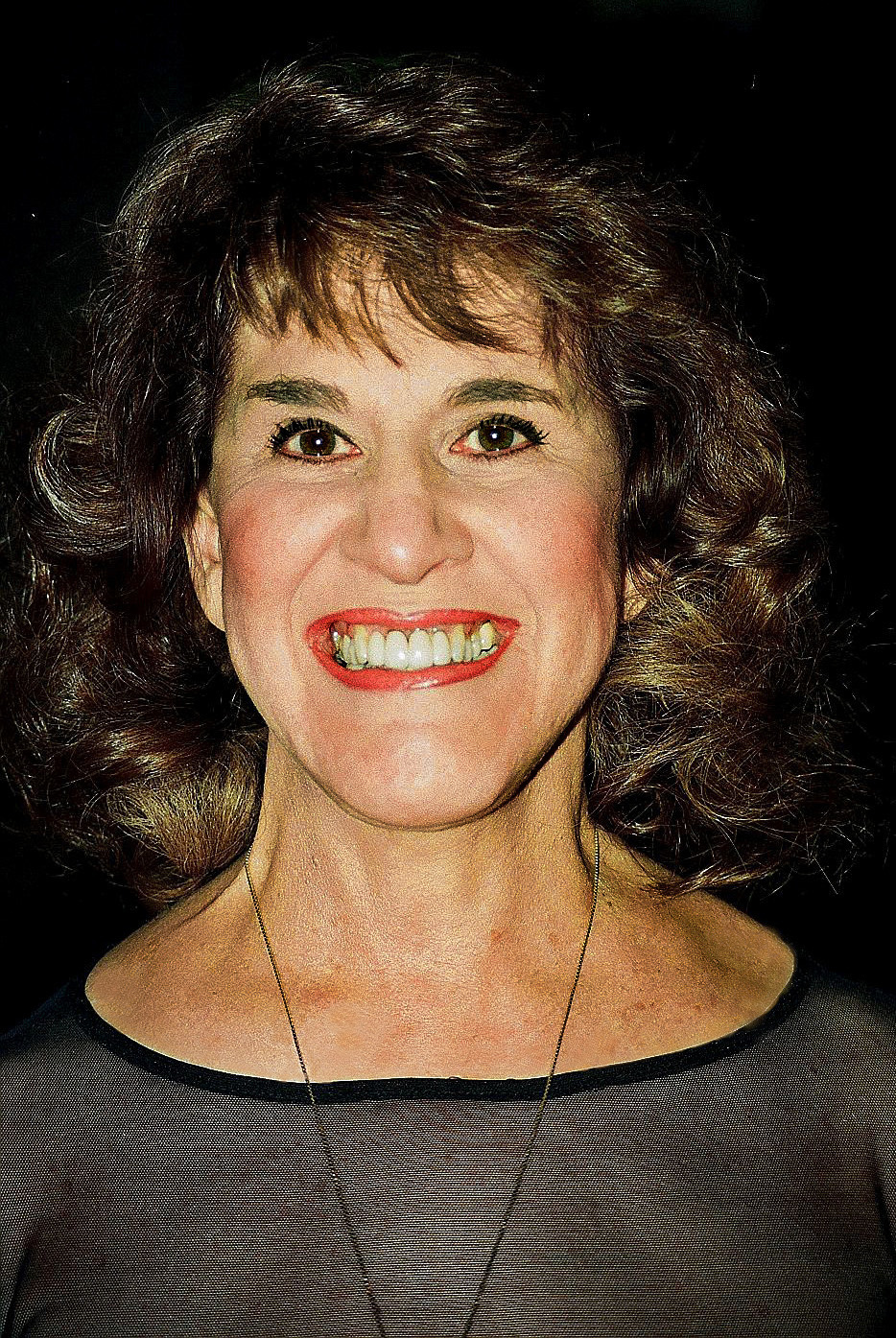
Ruth Buzzi

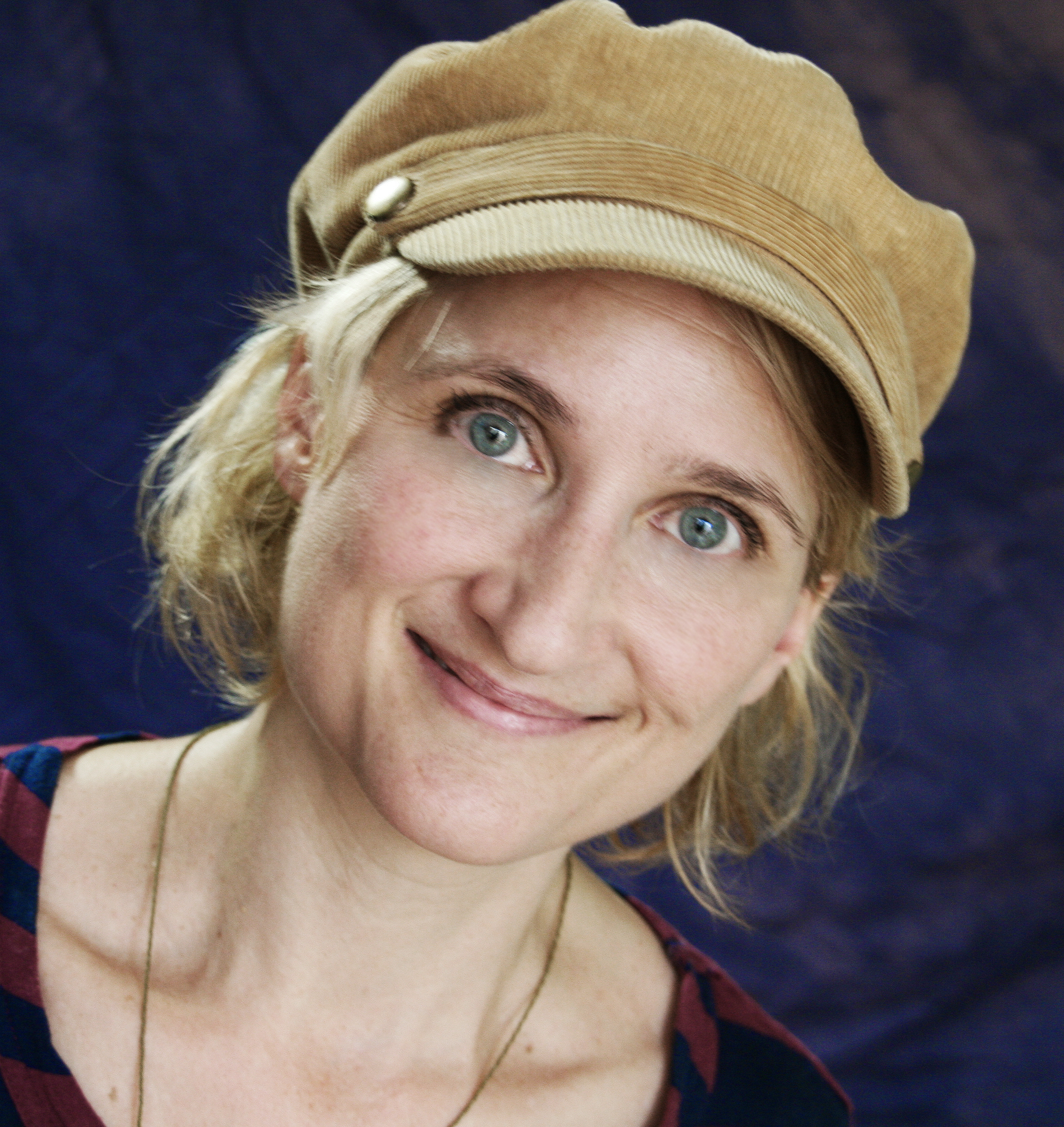
Jill Sobule

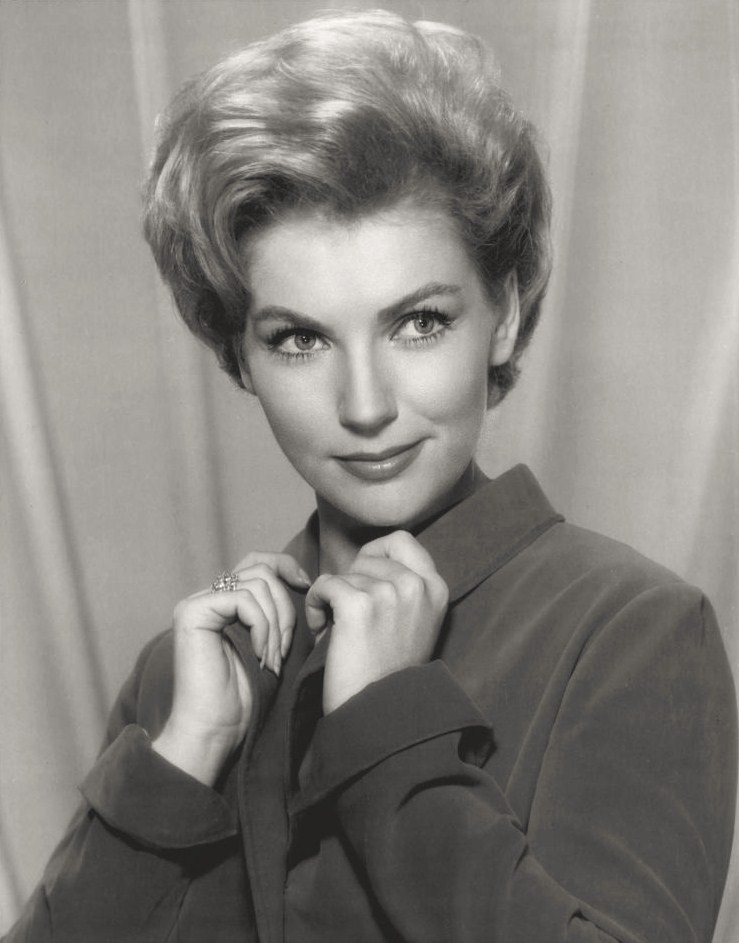
Joan O'Brien

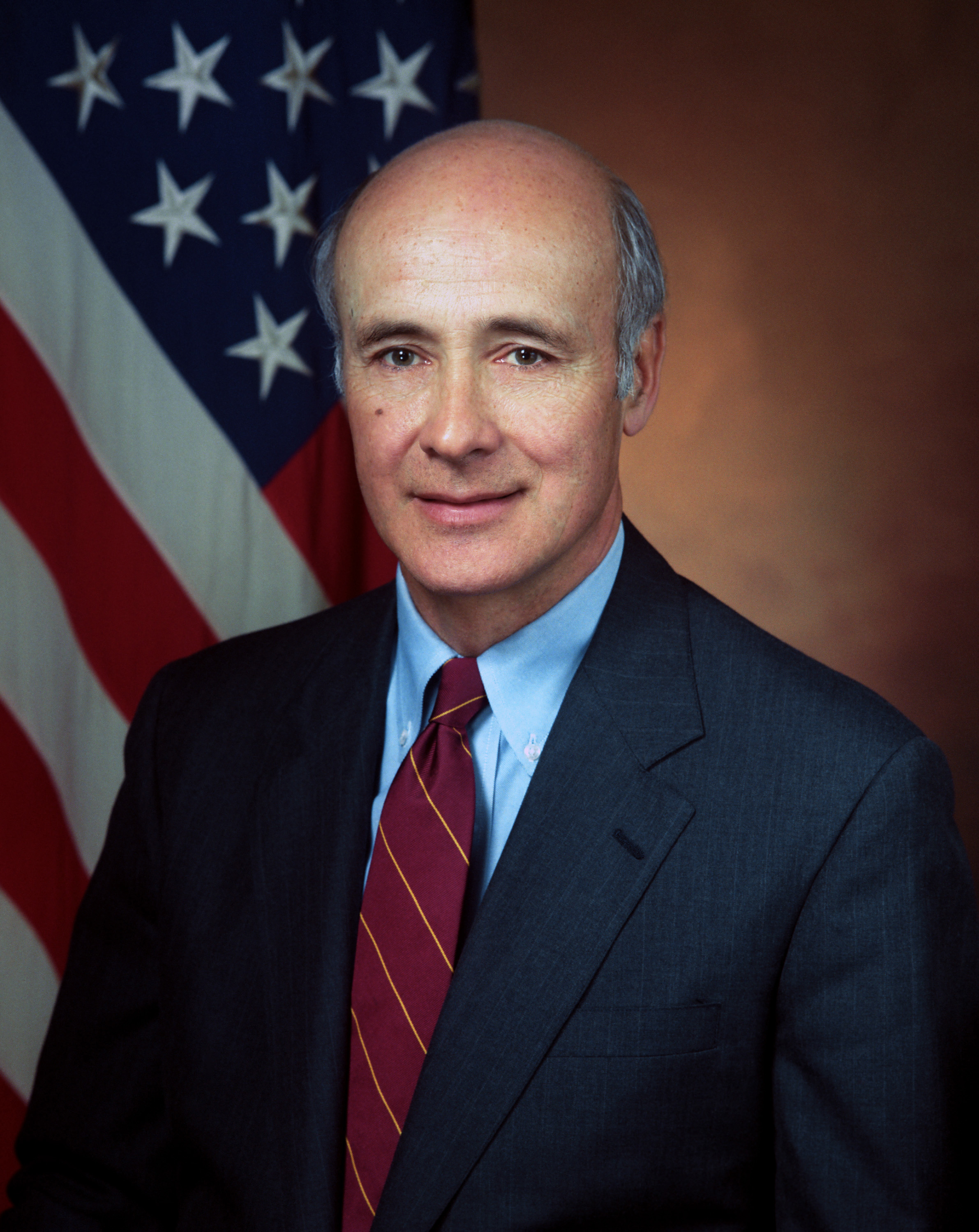
Joseph Nye

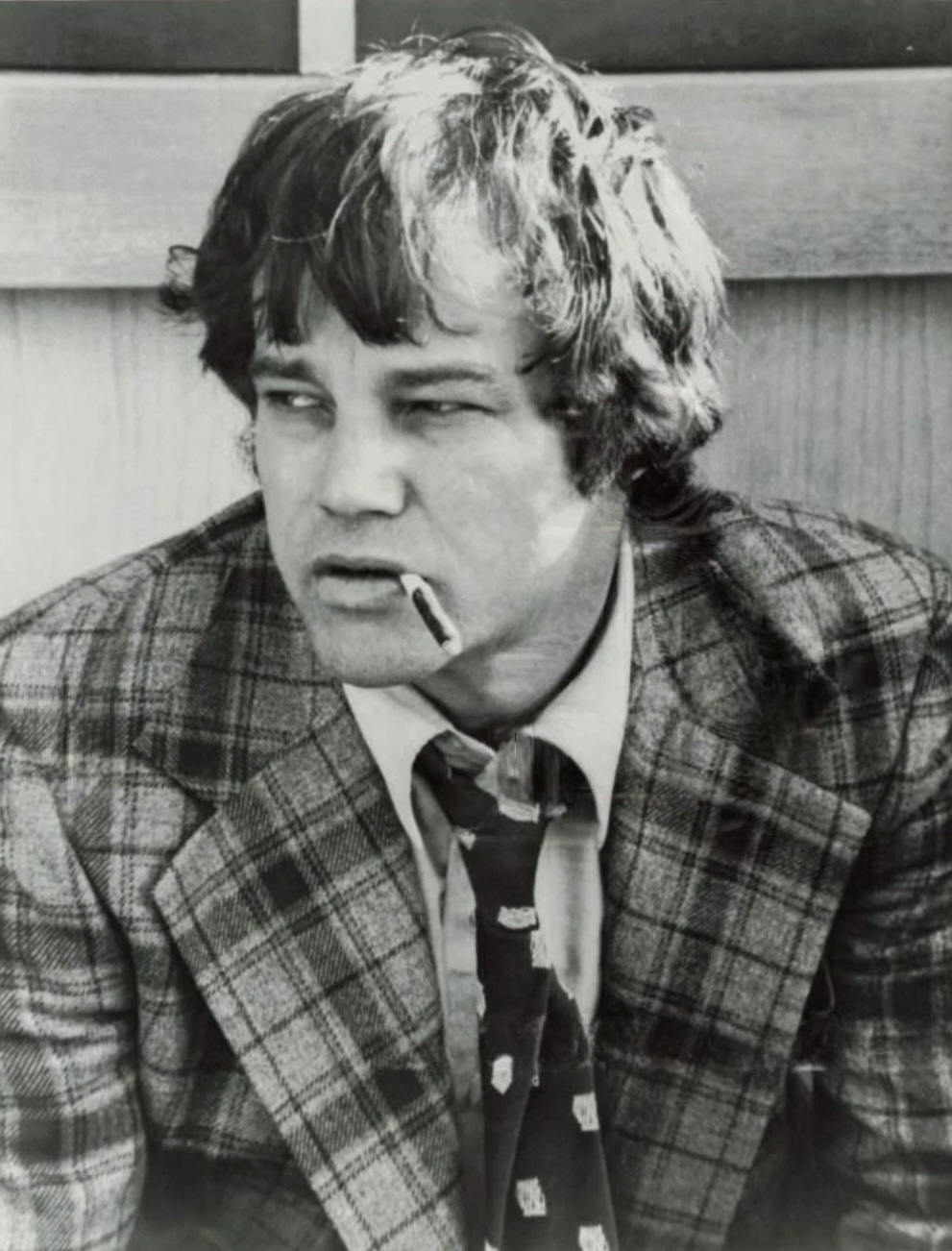
Joe Don Baker

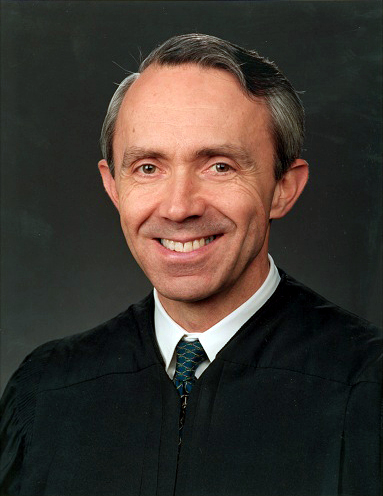
David Souter

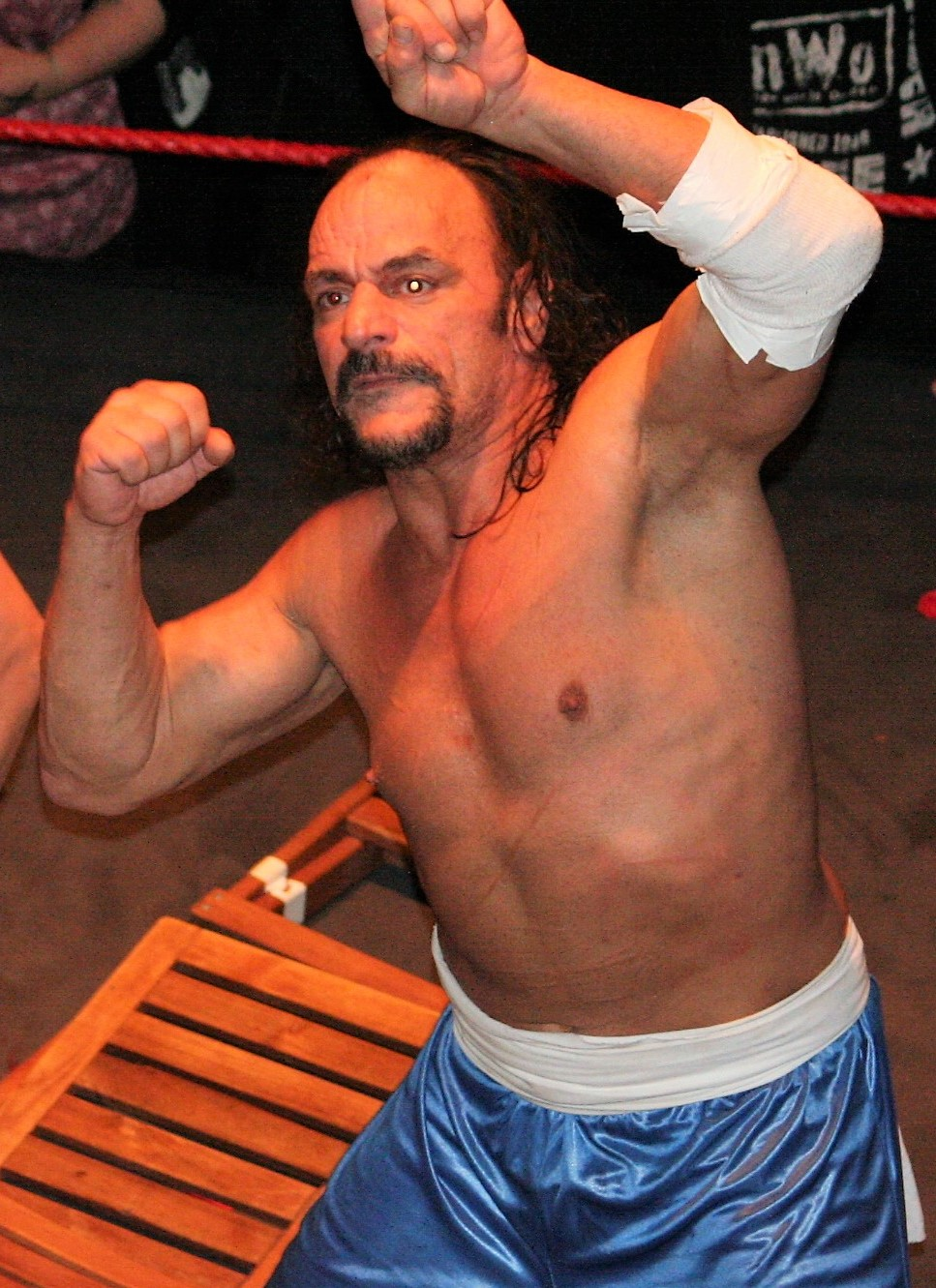
Sabu

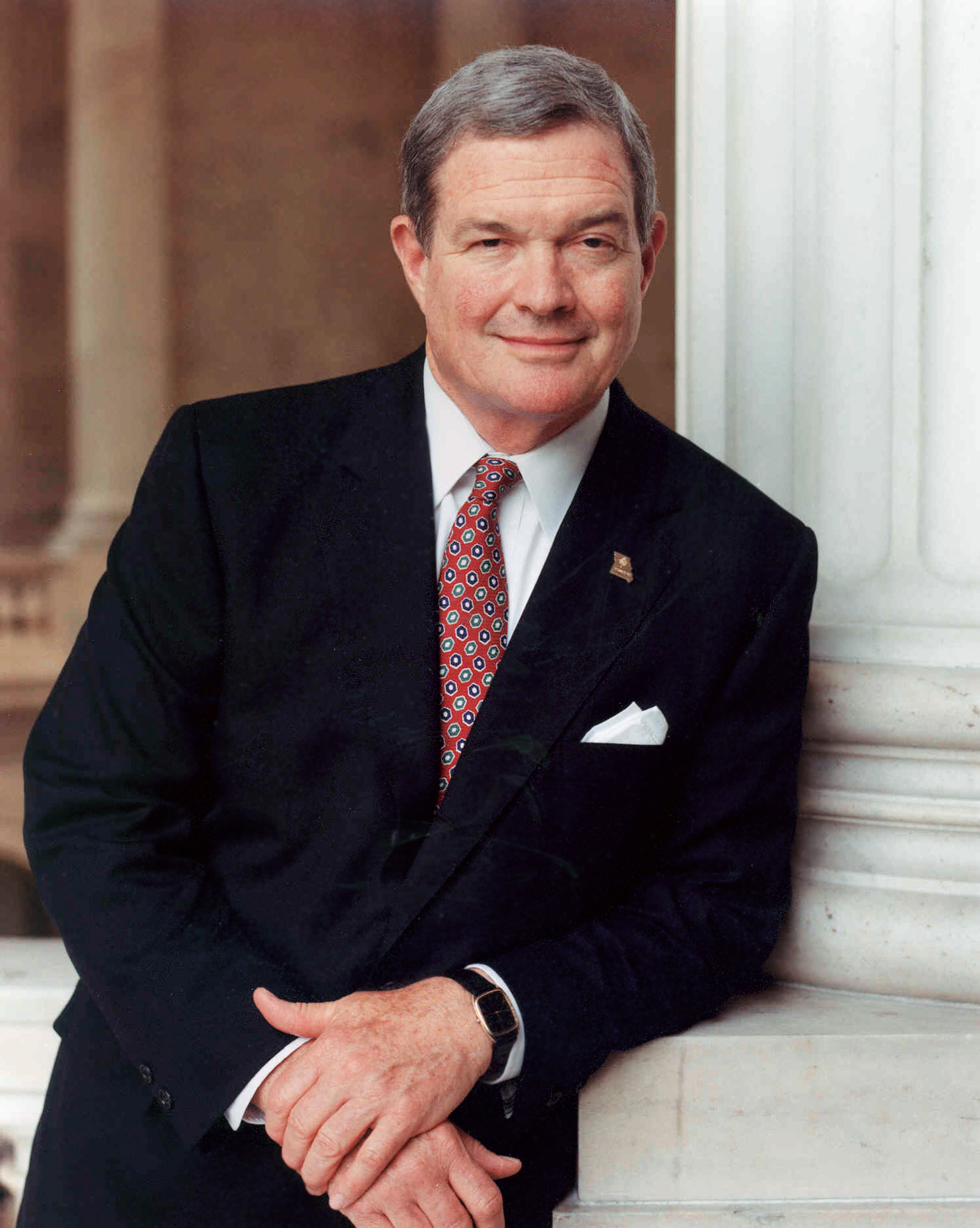
Kit Bond

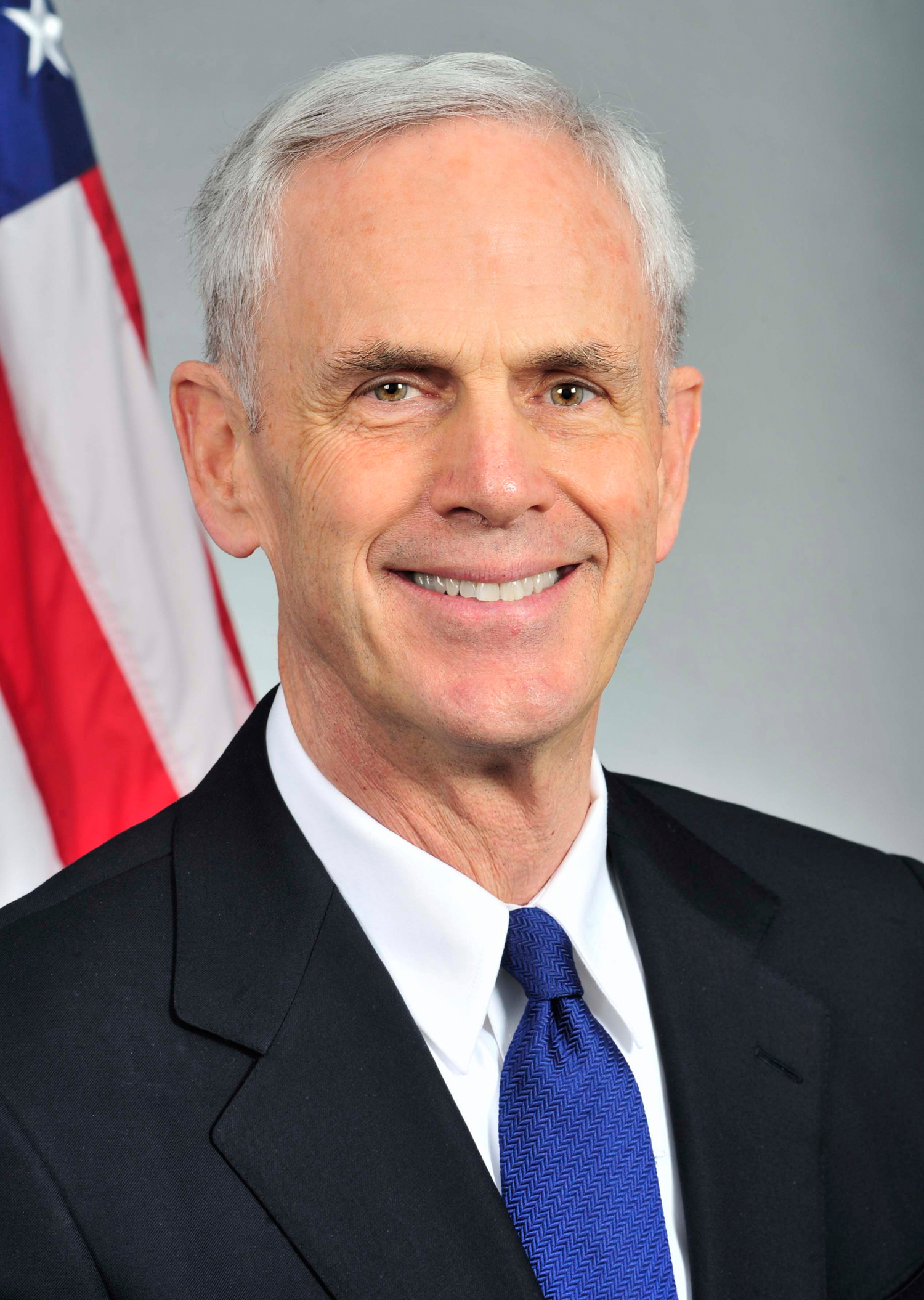
John Bryson

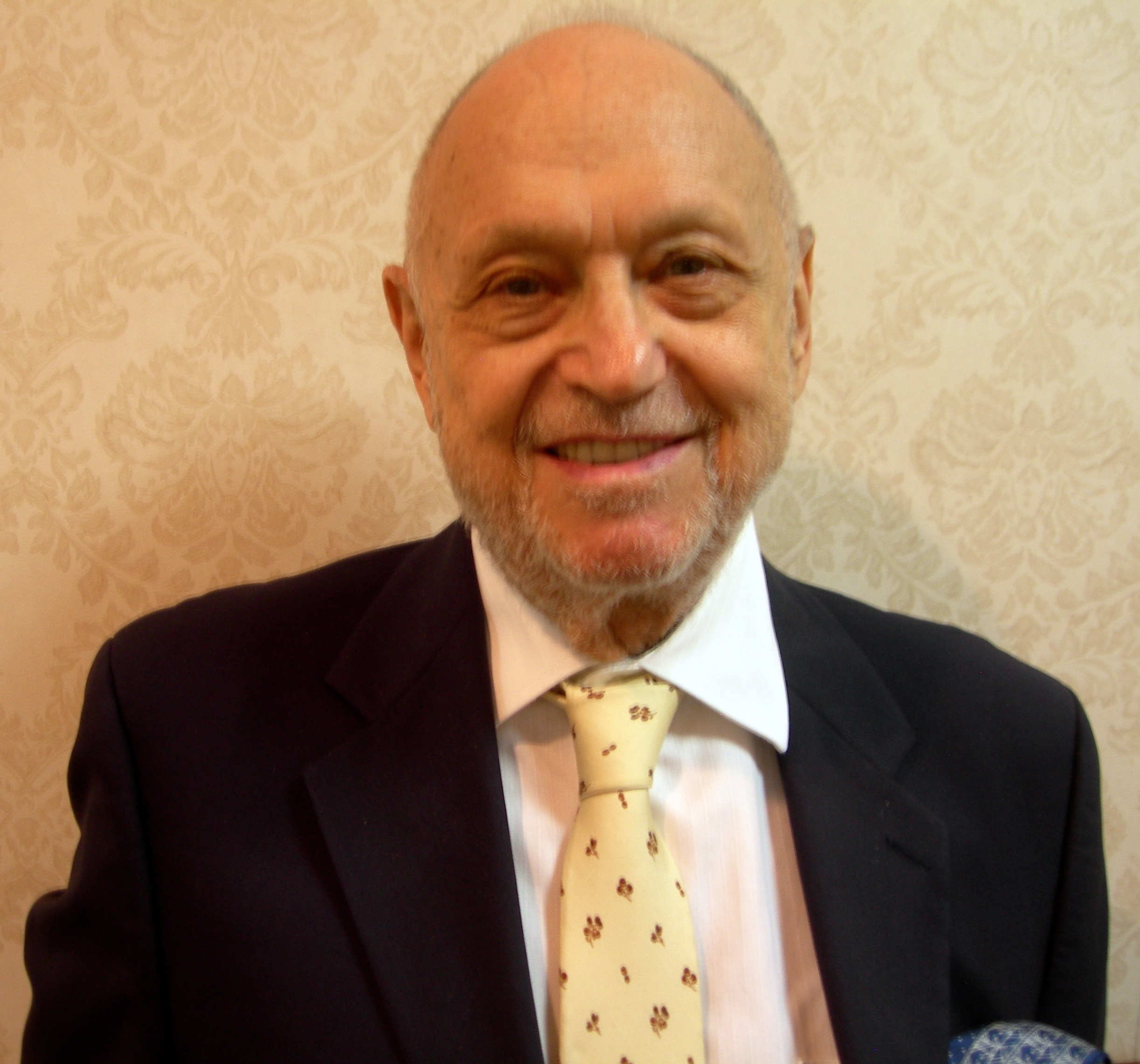
Charles Strouse

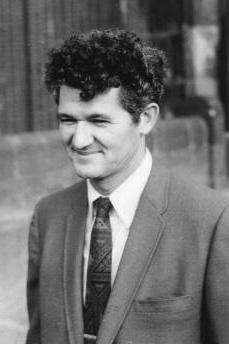
Peter Lax

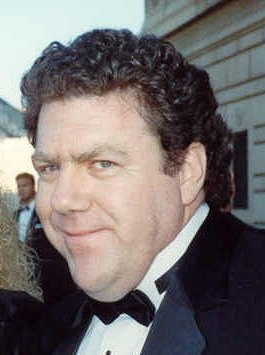
George Wendt

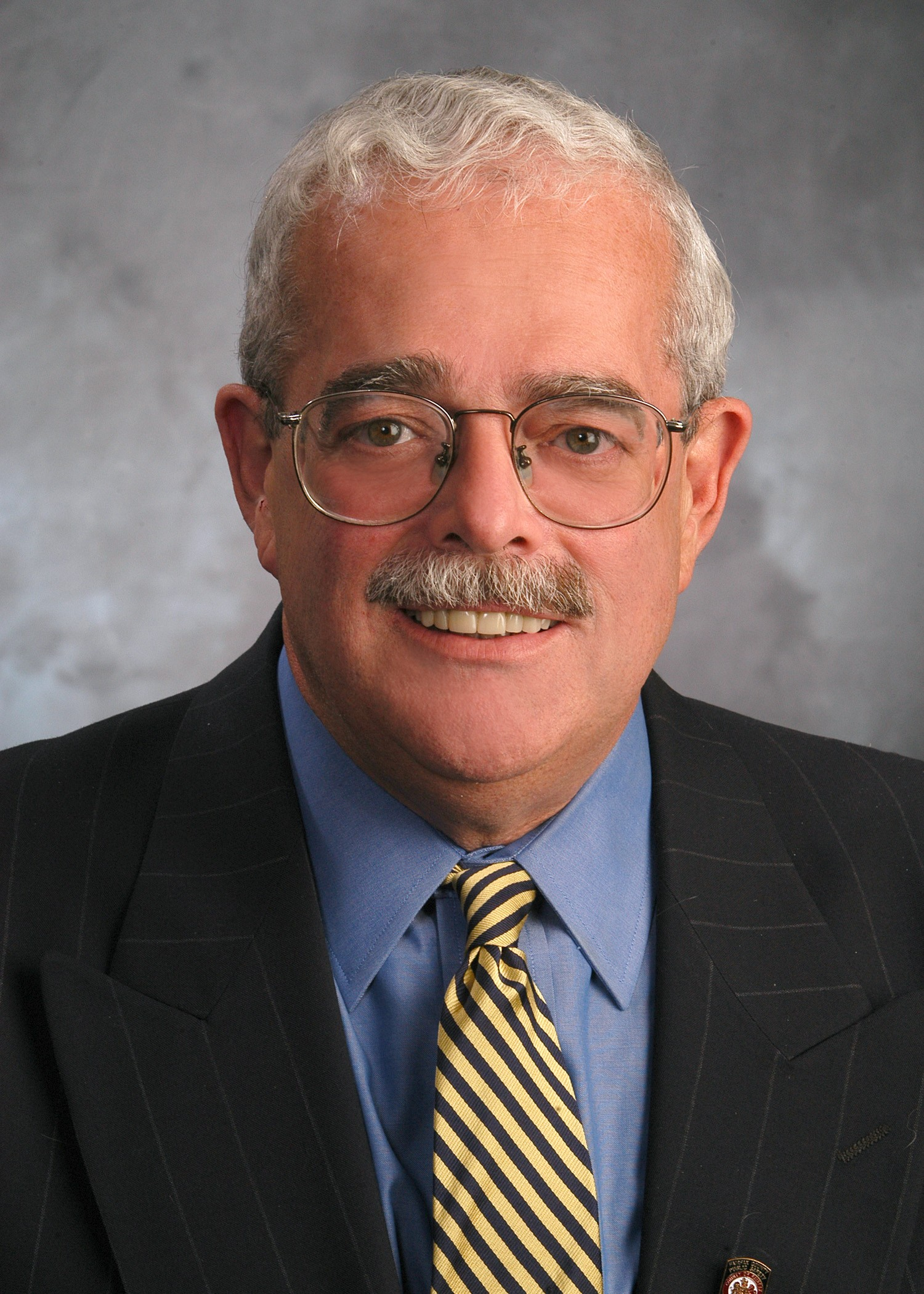
Gerry Connolly

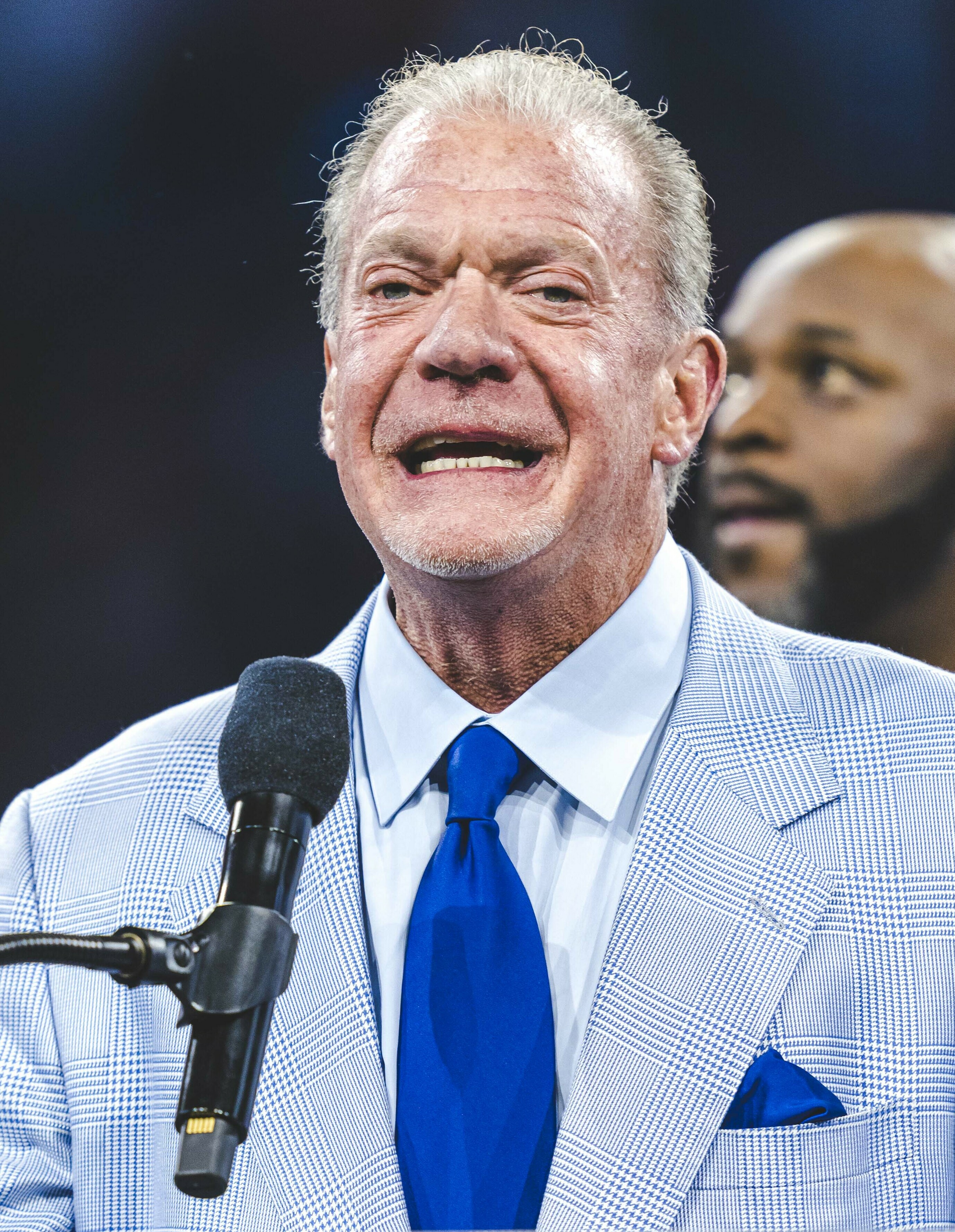
Jim Irsay

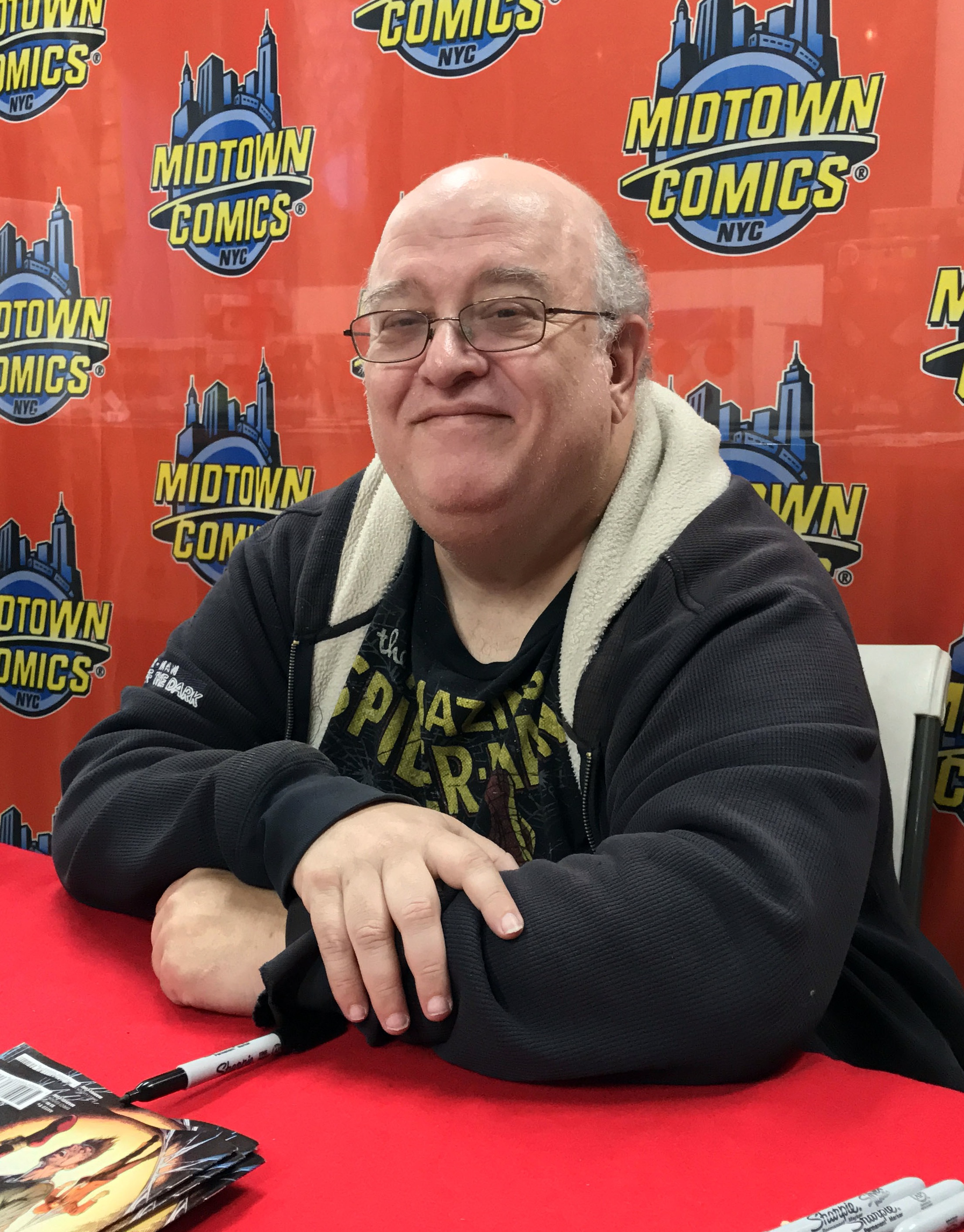
Peter David

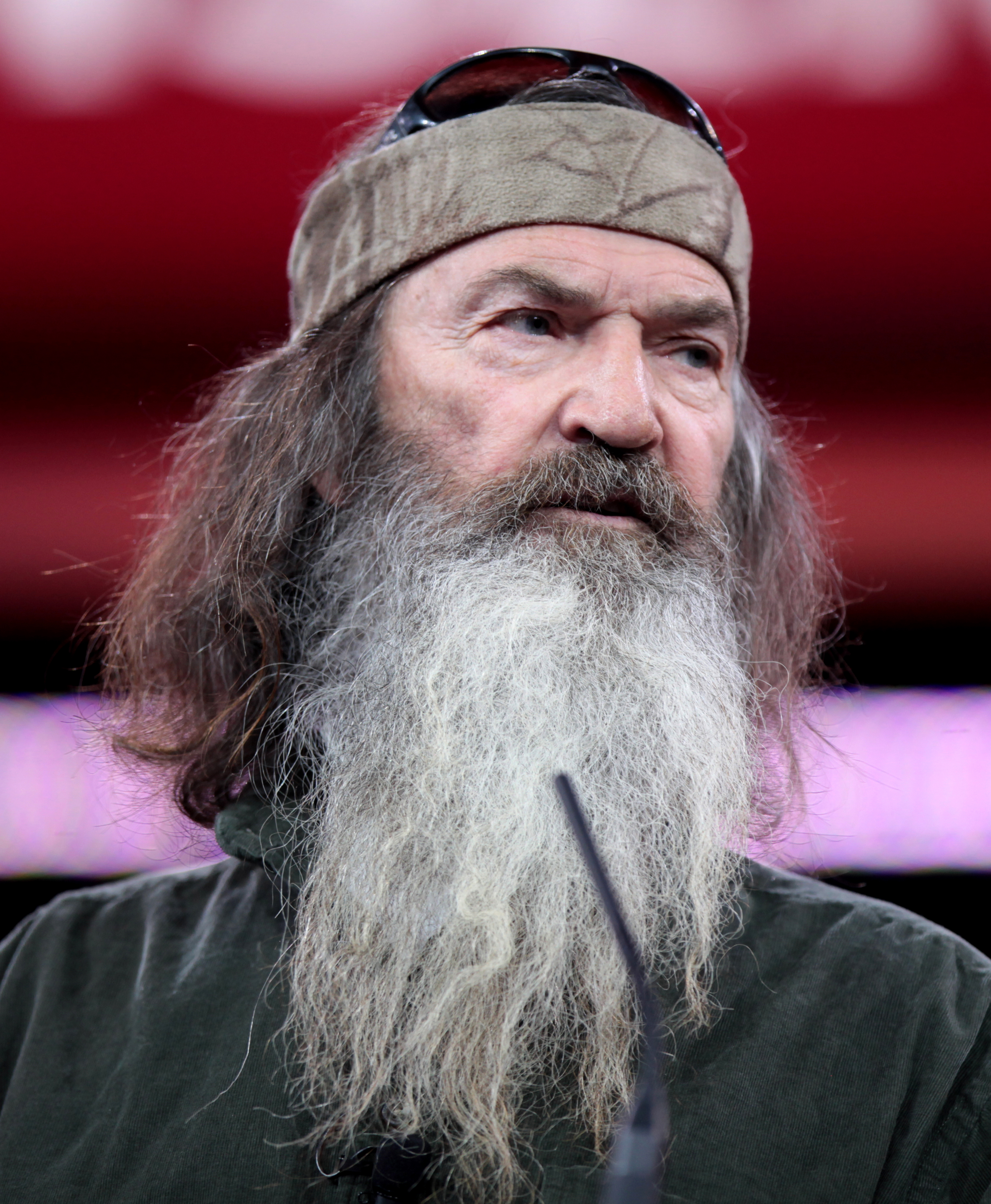
Phil Robertson

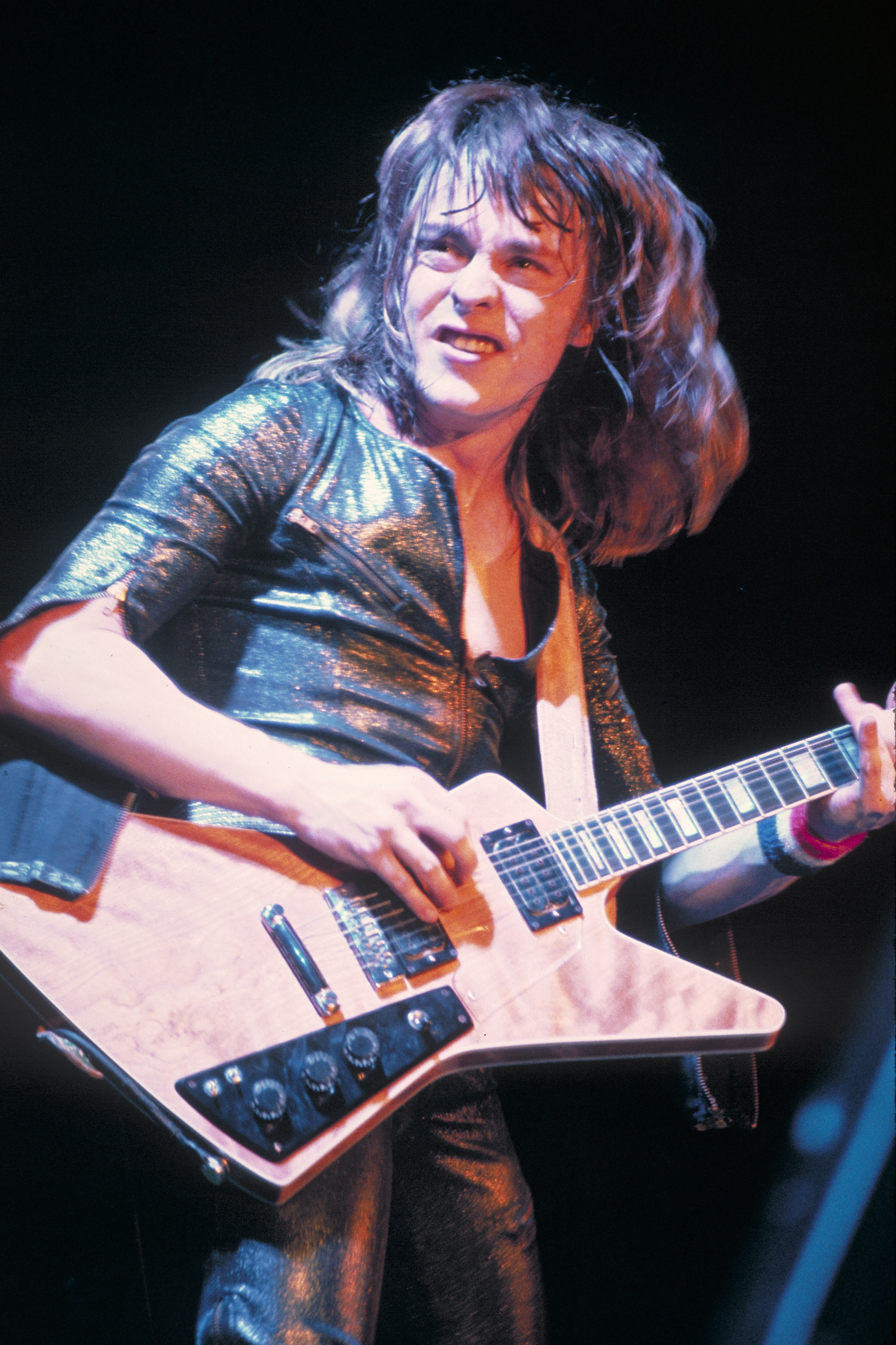
Rick Derringer

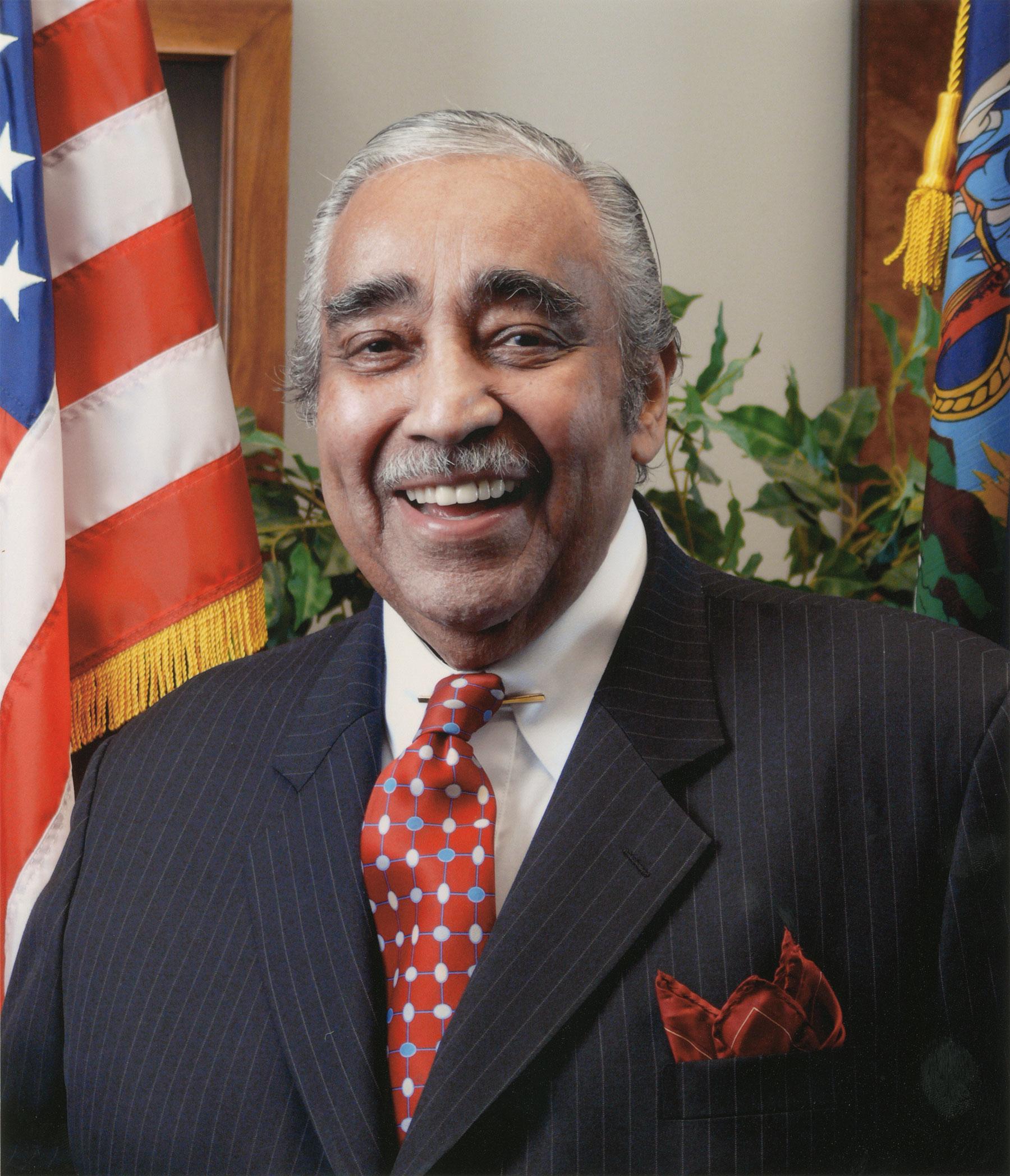
Charles Rangel

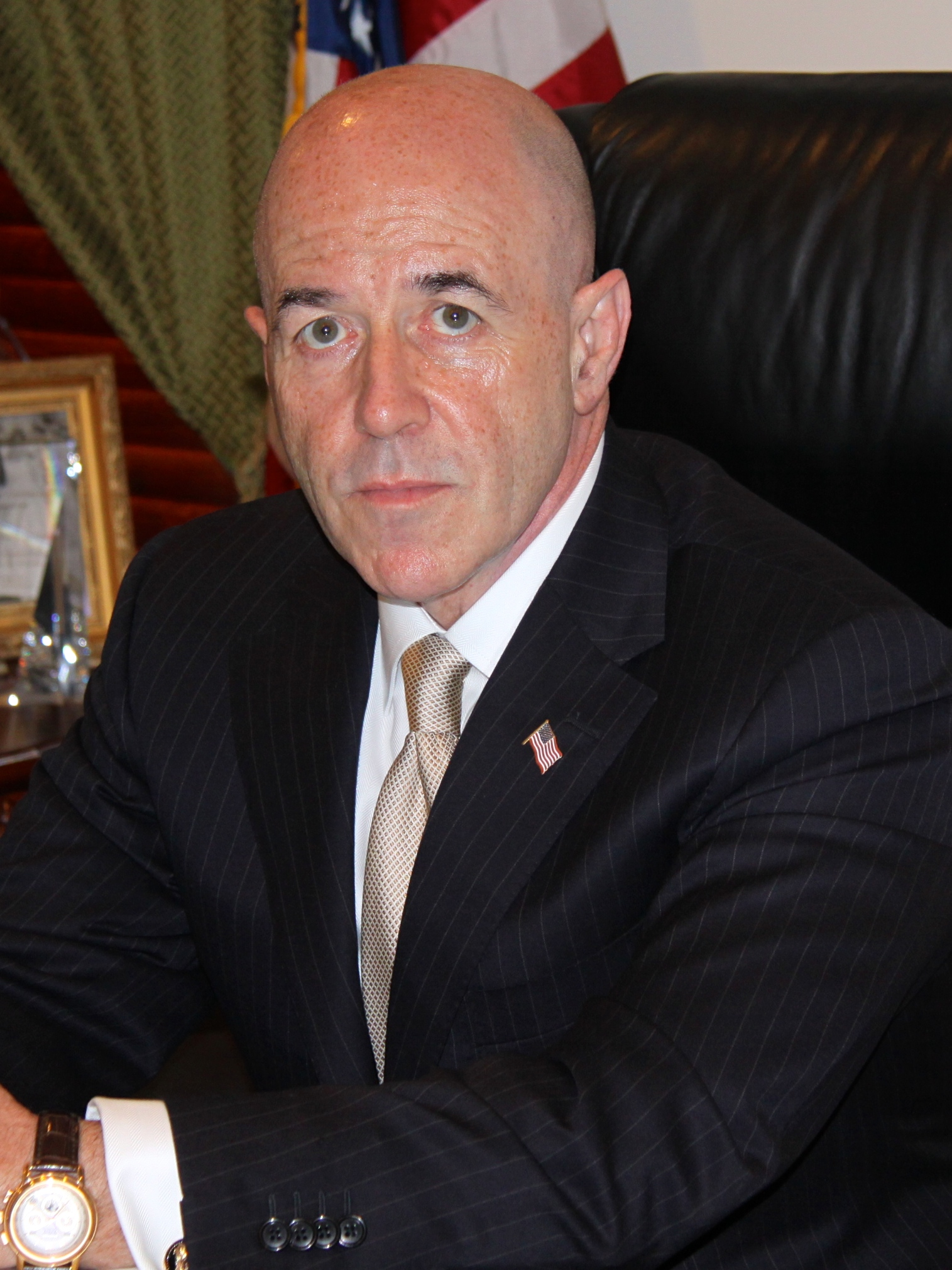
Bernard Kerik

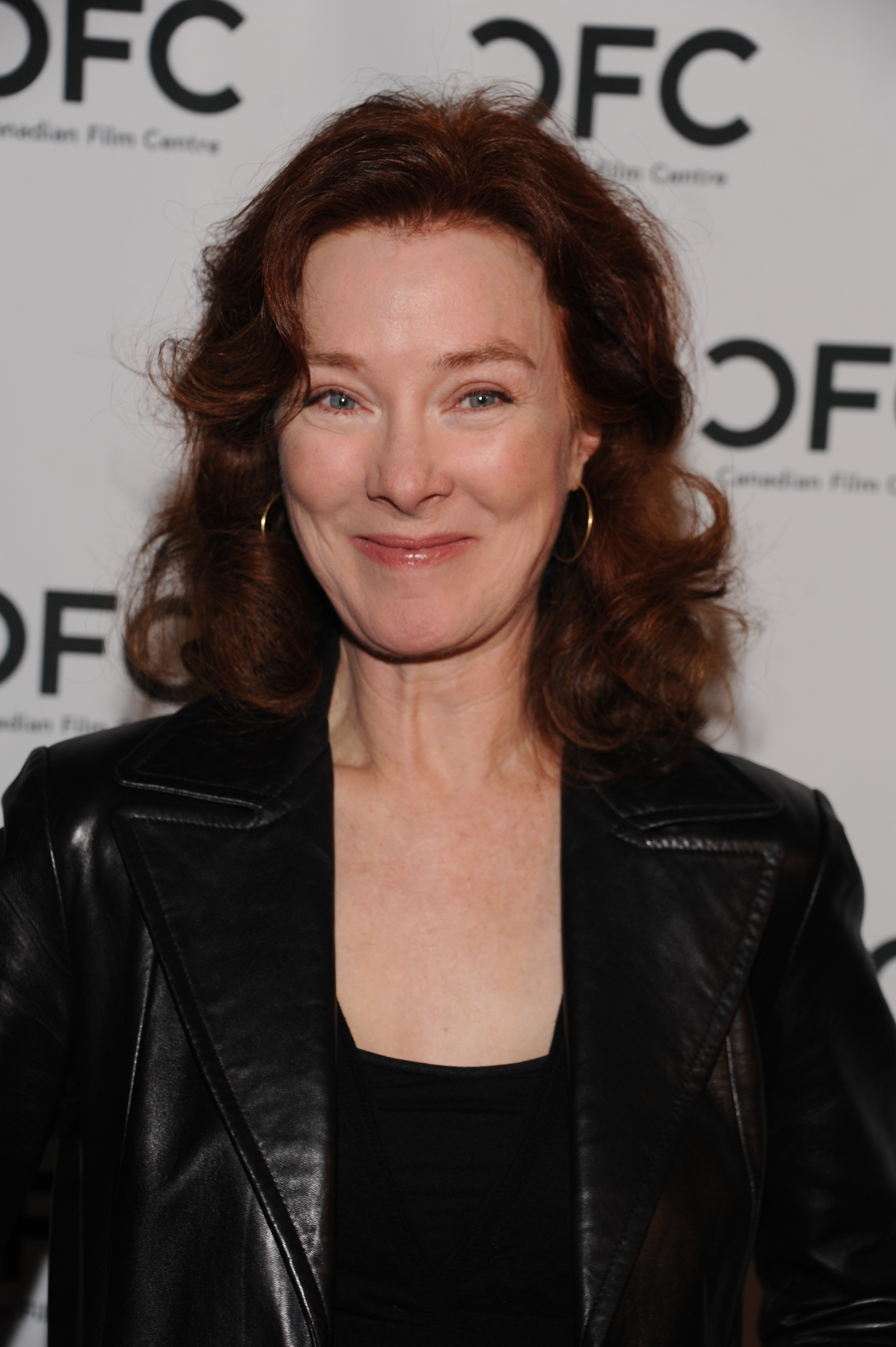
Valerie Mahaffey

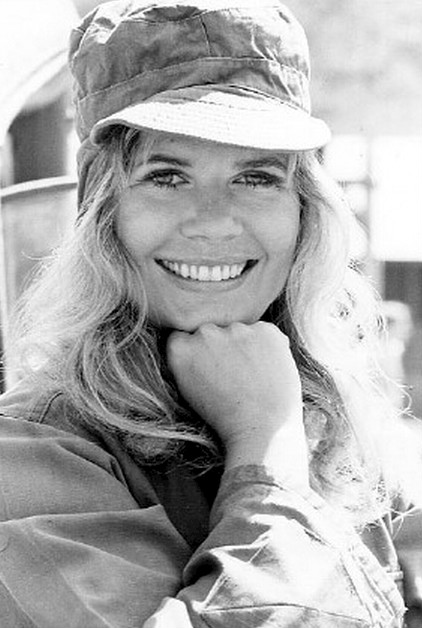
Loretta Swit

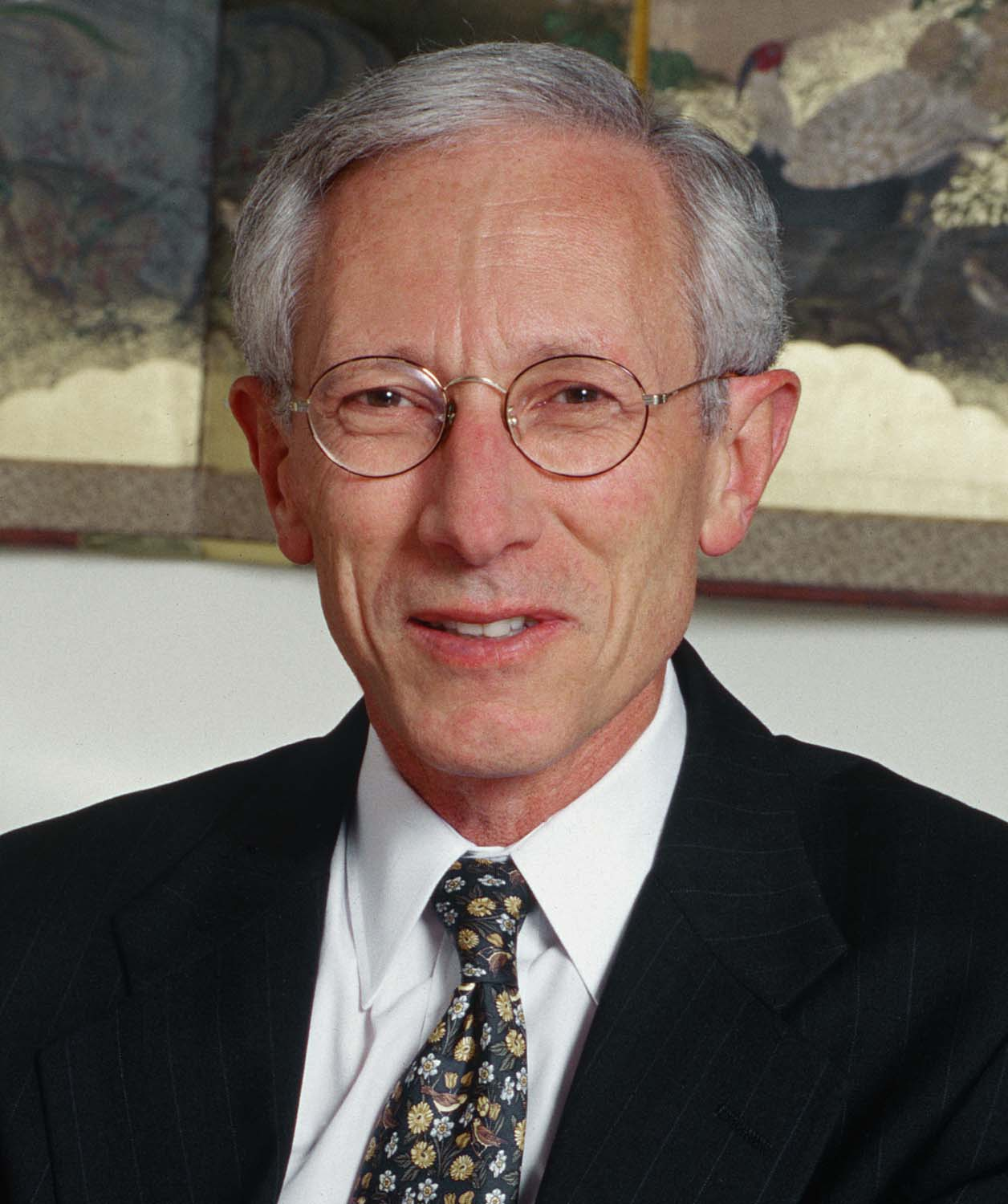
Stanley Fischer

- May 1
  - Ruth Buzzi, 88, comedian (Rowan & Martin's Laugh-In) and actress (Sesame Street, The Berenstain Bears) (b. 1936)
  - Tania Marie Caringi, 38, American-Italian model (b. 1986)
  - Jackson Guice, 63, comics artist (Superman, Captain America), co-creator of Apocalypse (b. 1961)
  - Jeffrey Hutchinson, 62, convicted murderer (b. 1962)
  - Larry Johnson, 70, basketball player (Buffalo Braves) (b. 1954)
  - Charley Scalies, 84, actor (The Wire, The Sopranos, Liberty Heights) (b. 1940)
  - Jill Sobule, 66, singer ("I Kissed a Girl", "Supermodel") and songwriter (b. 1959)
- May 2
  - Alexandra Bellow, 89, Romanian-born mathematician (b. 1935)
  - Dara Birnbaum, 78, video and installation artist (b. 1946)
  - Lisa Brown-Miller, 58, ice hockey player, Olympic champion (1998) (b. 1966)
  - Kathleen Corrigan, 80, Olympic gymnast (1964) (b. 1945)
  - Jim Dent, 85, golfer (b. 1939)
  - Harry Fritz, 74, American-Canadian tennis player (b. 1951)
  - Ron Haun, 82, college football coach (b. 1943)
  - Doug Hinds, 91, politician, member of the South Carolina Senate (b. 1933)
  - Kirk Medas, 33, television actor (Floribama Shore) (b. 1991/1992)
  - George Ryan, 91, politician, Illinois Secretary of State (1991–1999) and governor (1999–2003) (b. 1934)
  - Robert B. Shapiro, 86, businessman (Monsanto, G.D. Searle, LLC) (b. 1938)
  - Jim Smith, 70, animator (The Ren & Stimpy Show, Samurai Jack, The X's), co-founder of Spümcø (b. 1954)
  - José Torres, 65, educator, CEO of Chicago Public Schools (2021) (b. 1965)
- May 3
  - Ruth A. Davis, 81, diplomat, director general of the Foreign Service (2001–2003) (b. 1943)
  - Lino Gutierrez, 74, diplomat, ambassador to Nicaragua (1996–1999), ambassador to Argentina (2003–2006) (b. 1952)
  - Stephen Harmelin, 85, lawyer and speechwriter, White House director of speechwriting (1964–1965) (b. 1939)
  - Lori Healey, 65, urban planner (b. 1959/1960)
  - Harold Horton, 85, football player and coach (Arkansas Razorbacks) (b. 1939/1940)
  - Sholom Lipskar, 78–79, Uzbek-born Orthodox rabbi and community leader (b. 1946)
  - Steve Pepoon, 68, television writer (ALF, Get a Life, The Wild Thornberrys) (b. 1956)
  - James F. Rooney, 89, politician, member of the Wisconsin State Assembly (1973–1985) (b. 1935)
  - Shōzō Satō, 91, Japanese-born artist and theatre director, founder and director of Japan House (b. 1933)
  - David Young, 88, poet (b. 1936)
- May 4
  - Julia Alexander, 57–58, art historian and curator (b. 1967)
  - David Cope, 83, author, composer, and scientist (b. 1941)
  - Donald Dwight, 94, politician and newspaper executive, lieutenant governor of Massachusetts (1971–1975) (b. 1931)
  - Gerald Thomas Walsh, 83, Roman Catholic prelate, auxiliary bishop of New York (2004–2017) (b. 1942)
- May 5
  - Sunney Chan, 88, biophysical chemist (b. 1936)
  - Nathan Jerde, drummer (The Ponys).
  - Joan O'Brien, 89, actress (Operation Petticoat, It Happened at the World's Fair) and singer (b. 1936)
  - Squire Parsons, 77, Southern gospel singer-songwriter (b. 1948)
  - John Edd Thompson, 82, meteorologist (WALA-TV) (b. 1942/1943)
- May 6
  - Carl Crabtree, 72, politician, member of the Idaho Senate (2016–2022) (b. 1952)
  - Stephen Fabian, 95, painter (b. 1930)
  - James Foley, 71, film director (At Close Range, Glengarry Glen Ross, The Chamber) (b. 1953)
  - Barry B. Longyear, 82, author (b. 1942)
  - Barbara McIntire, 90, amateur golfer (b. 1935)
  - Joseph Nye, 88, political scientist, chair of the National Intelligence Council (1993–1994) and Assistant Secretary of Defense for International Security Affairs (1994–1995) (b. 1937)
- May 7
  - Joe Don Baker, 89, actor (Walking Tall, Fletch, GoldenEye) (b. 1936).
  - Nate Holden, 95, politician, member of the California Senate (1974–1978) and Los Angeles City Council (1987–2003) (b. 1929)
  - Frank Johnson, 82, baseball player (San Francisco Giants) (b. 1942)
  - Matthew Meadows, 87, politician and educator, member of the Florida Senate (1992–1998) and Florida House of Representatives (2000–2008) (b. 1938)
  - Rosanna Norton, 80, costume designer (Carrie, Airplane!, Tron) (b. 1944)
  - Bob White, 86, football player (OSU, Houston Oilers) (b. 1938)
- May 8
  - Charlie Buttons, 80, Jewish community representative (b. 1944)
  - Chet Lemon, 70, baseball player (Chicago White Sox, Detroit Tigers), World Series champion (1984) (b. 1955)
  - Alphonso Lingis, 91, philosopher (b. 1933)
  - Elizabeth Pochoda, 83, journalist (b. 1941)
  - Dan Seavey, 87, musher (b. 1938)
  - Eddie Sheldrake, 98, basketball player (UCLA Bruins) and restaurateur (b. 1926)
  - David Souter, 85, jurist, associate justice of the U.S. Supreme Court (1990–2009) (b. 1939)
- May 9
  - Greg Cannom, 73, make-up artist (Hook, Bram Stoker's Dracula, Mrs. Doubtfire) (b. 1951)
  - Stewart Francke, 66, singer-songwriter (b. 1958)
  - Samuel French, 45, actor (Killers of the Flower Moon, Fear the Walking Dead) (b. 1980)
  - Monroe Milstein, 98, retail executive, co-founder of Burlington Coat Factory (b. 1926/1927)
  - Johnny Rodriguez, 73, country singer (b. 1951)
  - John Stachel, 97, physicist (b. 1928)
  - John H. Thompson, 73, statistician, director of the U.S. Census Bureau (2013–2017) (b. 1951)
- May 10
  - Gerald Kaufman, 92, politician, member of the Pennsylvania House of Representatives (1967–1968, 1969–1972) (b. 1932)
  - Larry Lee, 78, musician (The Ozark Mountain Daredevils) and songwriter ("Jackie Blue") (b. 1947)
  - William Luers, 95, diplomat, president of the Metropolitan Museum of Art (1986–1999) (b. 1929)
  - Johnnie Walls, 80, lawyer and politician, member of the Mississippi State Senate (1993–2011) (b. 1944/1945)
- May 11
  - Chris Ballingall, 92, baseball player (Muskegon Belles, Kalamazoo Lassies) (b. 1932)
  - John Barbato, 90, mobster (Genovese crime family) (b. 1932)
  - Robert Benton, 92, film director (Kramer vs. Kramer, Places in the Heart) and screenwriter (Bonnie and Clyde), Oscar winner (1980, 1985) (b. 1932)
  - John Edwards, 80, Hall of Fame singer (The Spinners) (b. 1944)
  - Sharpe James, 89, politician, member of the New Jersey Senate (1999–2008) and mayor of Newark (1986–2006) (b. 1936)
  - Larry Miller, 79, basketball player (North Carolina Tar Heels, Los Angeles Stars, Carolina Cougars) (b. 1949)
  - Hans Noë, 96, architect and sculptor (b. 1928)
  - Sabu, 60, professional wrestler (USWA, ECW, WWE) (b. 1964)
- May 12
  - Jack Curtis, 88, baseball player (Chicago Cubs) (b. 1937)
  - Mark Esser, 69, baseball player (Chicago White Sox) (b. 1956)
  - Lorna Raver, 81, actress (Freeway, Drag Me to Hell, The Caller) (b. 1943)
- May 13
  - Kit Bond, 86, politician, governor of Missouri (1973–1977, 1981–1985) and member of the United States Senate (1987–2011) (b. 1939)
  - John Bryson, 81, businessman, lawyer and politician, secretary of commerce (2011–2012) (b. 1943)
  - Billy Earheart, 71, country keyboardist (The Amazing Rhythm Aces, The Bama Band) (b. 1954)
  - Bobby Franklin, 88, football player (Ole Miss Rebels, Cleveland Browns) (b. 1936)
  - Richard Garwin, 97, physicist (b. 1928)
  - Phyllis Gutiérrez Kenney, 88, politician, member of the Washington House of Representatives (1997–2013) (b. 1936)
  - D. S. Malik, 66, Indian-born mathematician (b. 1958)
  - Rich Rollins, 87, baseball player (Minnesota Twins, Milwaukee Brewers, Cleveland Indians) (b. 1938)
  - John R. Ross, 87, linguist (b. 1938)
  - Tommy Vigorito, 65, football player (Miami Dolphins) (b. 1959)
- May 14
  - Dale Henderson, 59, musician (Beowülf) (b. 1966) (death announced on this date)
  - Kip Holden, 72, politician, mayor of Baton Rouge (2005–2016), member of the Louisiana House of Representatives (1988–2002) and Senate (2002–2004) (b. 1952)
  - Rod Nichols, 60, baseball player (Cleveland Indians) (b. 1964)
- May 15
  - Taina Elg, 95, Finnish-born actress (Les Girls, Watusi, Imitation General) (b. 1930)
  - Steve Inwood, 78, actor (Fame, Staying Alive, Cruising) (b. 1947)
  - Glen Edward Rogers, 62, convicted serial killer (b. 1962)
  - Charles Strouse, 96, composer (Annie, Bye Bye Birdie, Applause) and lyricist (b. 1928)
  - Norma Meras Swenson, 92–93, reproductive rights activist (b. 1932)
- May 16
  - Howard Bier, 105, politician, member (1959–1972) and speaker (1971–1972) of the North Dakota House of Representatives (b. 1919)
  - Jason Conti, 50, baseball player (Arizona Diamondbacks, Tampa Bay Devil Rays, Milwaukee Brewers) (b. 1975)
  - Allen Goldman, 87, physicist (b. 1937)
  - Peter Lax, 99, Hungarian-born mathematician, Abel Prize laureate (2005) (b. 1926)
  - Glenn Renwick, 69, New Zealand-born business executive (Progressive) (b. 1955)
- May 17
  - Phillip Jacobson, 96, architect (b. 1928)
  - Michael Ledeen, 83, scholar and policy analyst (b. 1941)
  - Roger Nichols, 84, songwriter ("We've Only Just Begun", "Times of Your Life") and composer (b. 1940)
  - David R. Slavitt, 90, writer and poet (b. 1935)
- May 18
  - Jay Batt, 64, businessman and politician, member of the New Orleans City Council (2002–2006) (b. 1960/1961)
  - Leslie Epstein, 87, writer and academic (b. 1938)
  - Jo Ann Prentice, 92, golfer (b. 1933)
  - Cindy Schreiber-Beck, 70, politician, member of the North Dakota House of Representatives (since 2014) (b. 1954) (death announced on this date)
- May 19
  - Colton Ford, 62, gay pornographic actor (Naked Fame, The Lair) and singer (b. 1962)
  - J. Arch Getty, 74, historian and academic (b. 1950)
  - Chris Hager, 67, guitarist (Rough Cutt, Mickey Ratt) (b. 1957/1958) (death announced on this date)
  - Kathleen Hughes, 96, actress (It Came from Outer Space, The Glass Web, For Men Only) (b. 1928)
  - George Leitmann, 99, Austrian-born engineer and scientist (b. 1925)
  - Adam Ramey, 31, vocalist (Dropout Kings) (b. 1993/1994)
- May 20
  - Lynn Amedee, 83, football player (LSU) and coach (UT-Martin) (b. 1941)
  - Kay Arthur, 91, Christian author, co-founder of Precept Ministries International.
  - Michael Cavanagh, 84, jurist, member of the Michigan Supreme Court (1983–2014), chief justice (1991–1995) (b. 1940)
  - Willard D. James, 97, mathematician (b. 1927)
  - Mark Greene, singer (The Moments). (death announced on this date)
  - Scott Klingenbeck, 54, baseball player (Baltimore Orioles) (b. 1971)
  - Alice Notley, 79, poet (b. 1945)
  - Benjamin Ritchie, 45, convicted murderer (b. 1980)
  - Michael Roemer, 97, film director and screenwriter (Nothing but a Man, The Plot Against Harry, Dying) (b. 1928)
  - George Wendt, 76, actor (Cheers, Fletch, No Small Affair) (b. 1948)
  - Marina von Neumann Whitman, 90, economist (b. 1935)
- May 21
  - Gerry Connolly, 75, politician, member of the U.S. House of Representatives (since 2009) (b. 1950)
  - George Coulam, 87, businessman, founder of the Texas Renaissance Festival (b. 1937) (body discovered on this date)
  - Randy Crowder, 72, football player (Miami Dolphins, Tampa Bay Buccaneers) (b. 1952) (death announced on this date)
  - Robert A. Holton, 81, chemist (b. 1944)
  - Hou Beiren, 108, Chinese-born politician and painter (b. 1917)
  - Jim Irsay, 65, football executive, general manager (1984–1996) and owner (since 1997) of the Indianapolis Colts (b. 1959)
  - Alasdair MacIntyre, 96, Scottish-born philosopher (After Virtue) (b. 1929)
- May 22
  - Ellen S. Berscheid, 88, psychologist (b. 1936)
  - Victoria Brownworth, 69, writer and journalist (b. 1956)
  - Buddy Hall, 79, pool player (b. 1945)
  - Guy Klucevsek, 78, accordionist (b. 1947)
  - James Lowe, 82, musician (The Electric Prunes) and record producer (A Woofer in Tweeter's Clothing) (b. 1943)
  - James Lloydovich Patterson, 91, Russian-born child actor (Circus) and naval officer (b. 1933)
  - Tommy Reamon, 73, football player (Florida Blazers, Kansas City Chiefs) and actor (North Dallas Forty) (b. 1952) (death announced on this date)
  - Oscar Franklin Smith, 75, convicted murderer (b. 1950)
  - Pippa Scott, 90, actress (The Searchers, As Young as We Are, Auntie Mame) (b. 1934)
  - Dave Shapiro, 42, music agent (b. 1983)
  - Dan Storper, 74, record label executive (Putumayo World Music) (b. 1951)
  - Daniel Williams, 39, metalcore drummer (The Devil Wears Prada) (b. 1985)
- May 23
  - Lillian Boutté, 75, jazz singer.
  - Alana Cruise, 44, pornographic actress.
  - Mary K. Gaillard, 86, physicist (b. 1939)
  - Sacha Jenkins, 53–54, hip-hop journalist (Ego Trip) (b. 1971)
  - Jeff Margolis, 78, television director (The Beatrice Arthur Special, Julie & Carol: Together Again, Academy Awards) and producer (b. 1946)
  - Pat O'Connor, 74, boxer (b. 1950)
  - W. Anthony Park, 90, politician and attorney, Idaho attorney general (1971–1975) (b. 1934)
  - John George Vlazny, 88, Roman Catholic prelate, archbishop of Portland (1997–2013) (b. 1937)
  - Margaret Weitz, 95, scholar (b. 1929)
- May 24
  - Susan Brownmiller, 90, journalist and author (Against Our Will) (b. 1935)
  - Peter David, 68, comic book writer (The Incredible Hulk, Young Justice, Spider-Man 2099) (b. 1956)
  - Paul Jasmin, 90, artist and actor (Psycho, Marie Antoinette, Adaptation) (b. 1935)
- May 25
  - Stan Atkinson, 92, television news anchor (KOVR, KCRA) (b. 1932)
  - Christophe Clement, 59, French-born American Thoroughbred horse trainer (b. 1965) (death announced on this date)
  - Don Combs, 86, Thoroughbred racehorse trainer (b. 1938/1939)
  - Ralph Heck, 83, football player (Philadelphia Eagles, Atlanta Falcons, New York Giants) (b. 1941)
  - Cathy Hudgins, 81, politician (b. 1944)
  - Phil Robertson, 79, television personality (Duck Dynasty), inventor, and founder of Duck Commander (b. 1946)
  - Michael Sumler, 71, stylist and choreographer (Kool & the Gang) (b. 1953/1954)
  - Harrison Ruffin Tyler, 96, chemical engineer and preservationist (b. 1928)
  - Ward Winer, 88, engineer (b. 1936)
- May 26
  - Sherry Bryce, 78, country singer (b. 1946)
  - Rick Derringer, 77, musician (The McCoys), singer ("Rock and Roll, Hoochie Koo") and record producer ("Weird Al" Yankovic) (b. 1947)
  - Robert Jarvik, 79, medical engineer (b. 1946)
  - Paul Marantz, 86–87, architectural lighting designer (b. 1938)
  - Charles Rangel, 94, politician, member of the U.S. House of Representatives (1971–2017) (b. 1930)
  - Horace Speed, 73, baseball player (Cleveland Indians, San Francisco Giants) (b. 1951)
  - Len St. Jean, 83, football player (New England Patriots) (b. 1941)
- May 27
  - Ronnie Dugger, 95, journalist (The Texas Observer) (b. 1930)
  - Ed Gale, 61, stuntman (Child's Play) and actor (Howard the Duck, Spaceballs) (b. 1963)
  - Peter Kwong, 73, actor (Big Trouble in Little China, The Golden Child, Cooties) (b. 1952)
  - Deborah Wheeler, 80, politician, member of the New Hampshire House of Representatives (2006–2010, 2014–2016) (b. 1945)
  - Charles K. Wiggins, 77, jurist, justice of the Washington Supreme Court (2011–2020) (b. 1947)
  - Herbert P. Wilkins, 95, American jurist, chief justice of the Massachusetts Supreme Judicial Court (1996–1999) (b. 1930)
- May 28
  - Al Foster, 82, jazz drummer (b. 1943)
  - Bradley Jennings, 47, football player (Florida State Seminoles) (b. 1977)
  - George E. Smith, 95, physicist, co-inventor of the charge-coupled device, Nobel Prize laureate (2009) (b. 1930)
  - Verle Tiefenthaler, 87, baseball player (Chicago White Sox) (b. 1937)
- May 29
  - John Boardman, 92, physicist (b. 1932)
  - Alf Clausen, 84, television composer (The Simpsons, ALF, Moonlighting), Emmy winner (1997, 1998) (b. 1941)
  - Mike Eddy, 72, stock car racer (ASA) (b. 1952)
  - Bernard Kerik, 69, police officer and political consultant, New York City police commissioner (2000–2001) (b. 1955)
  - Paul Marantz, 86–87, architectural lighting designer (b. 1938) (death announced on this date)
  - Susann McDonald, 90, classical harpist (b. 1935)
  - Deborah Pellow, 80, anthropologist (b. 1945)
  - Charles Wadsworth, 96, pianist (b. 1929)
- May 30
  - Michael J. Byrnes, 66, Roman Catholic prelate, archbishop of Agaña (2019–2023) (b. 1958)
  - Valerie Mahaffey, 71, actress (The Doctors, Northern Exposure, Desperate Housewives) (b. 1953)
  - Loretta Swit, 87, actress (M*A*S*H, Freebie and the Bean, Race with the Devil), Emmy winner (1980, 1982) (b. 1937)
  - John Thrasher, 81, politician, member of the Florida Senate (2009–2014), president of Florida State University (2014–2021) (b. 1943)
  - Renée Victor, 86, actress (Weeds, Coco, The Elder Scrolls V: Skyrim) (b. 1938)
- May 31
  - John Brenkus, 54, television host (Sports Science) and producer (b. 1971)
  - Michael J. Byrnes, 66, Roman Catholic prelate, archbishop of Agaña (2019–2023) (b. 1965)
  - Stanley Fischer, 81, Israeli-born economist, governor of the Bank of Israel (2005–2013) and Vice Chair of the Federal Reserve (2014–2017) (b. 1943)
  - Betsy Jochum, 104, baseball player (South Bend Blue Sox) (b. 1921)
  - Jerrauld Jones, 70, politician and jurist, member of the Virginia House of Delegates (1988–2002) (b. 1954)
  - William S. Sly, 92, physician (b. 1932)

== June ==
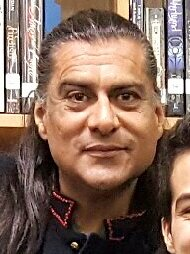
Jonathan Joss

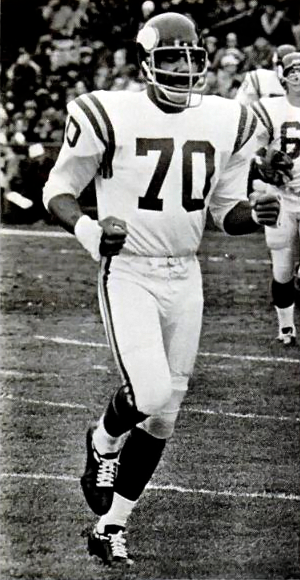
Jim Marshall

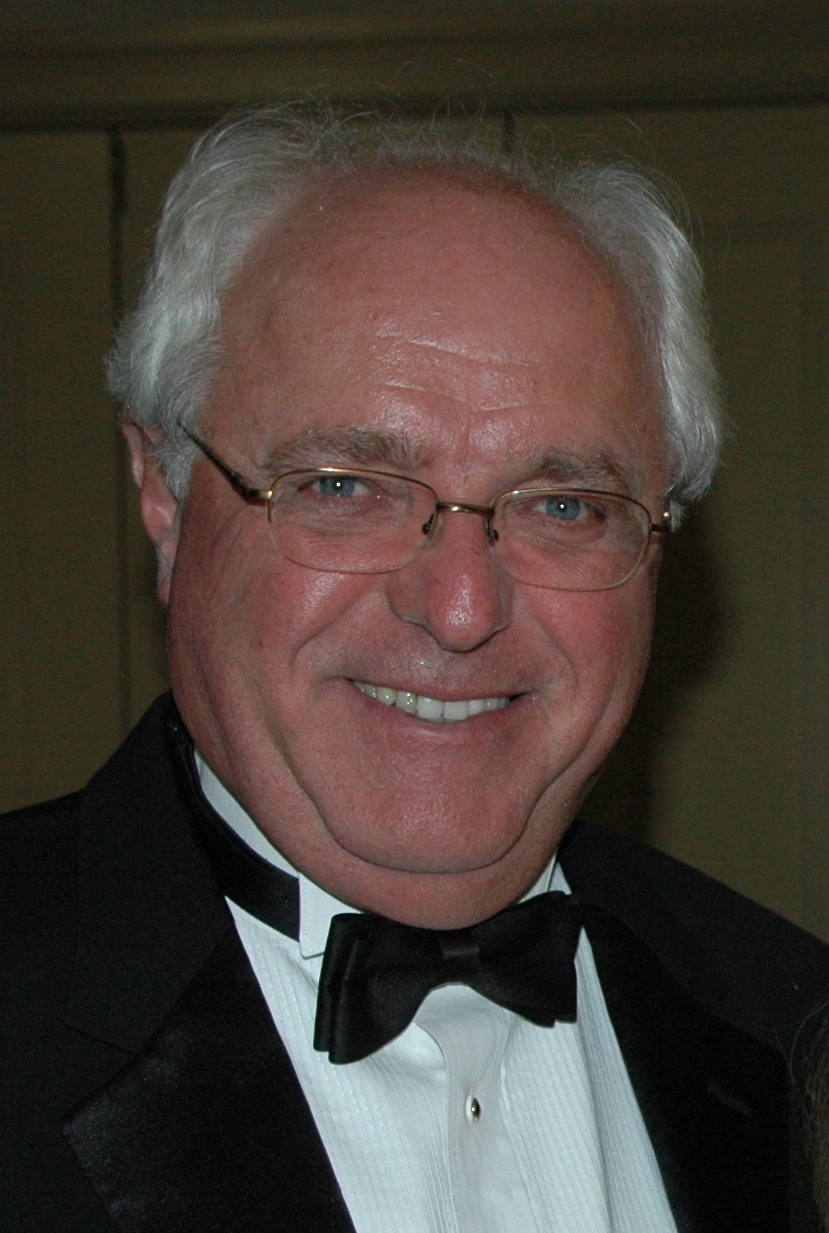
Bill Atkinson

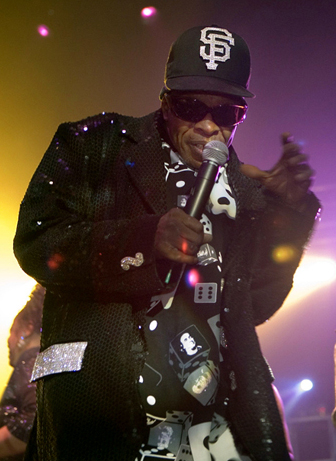
Sly Stone

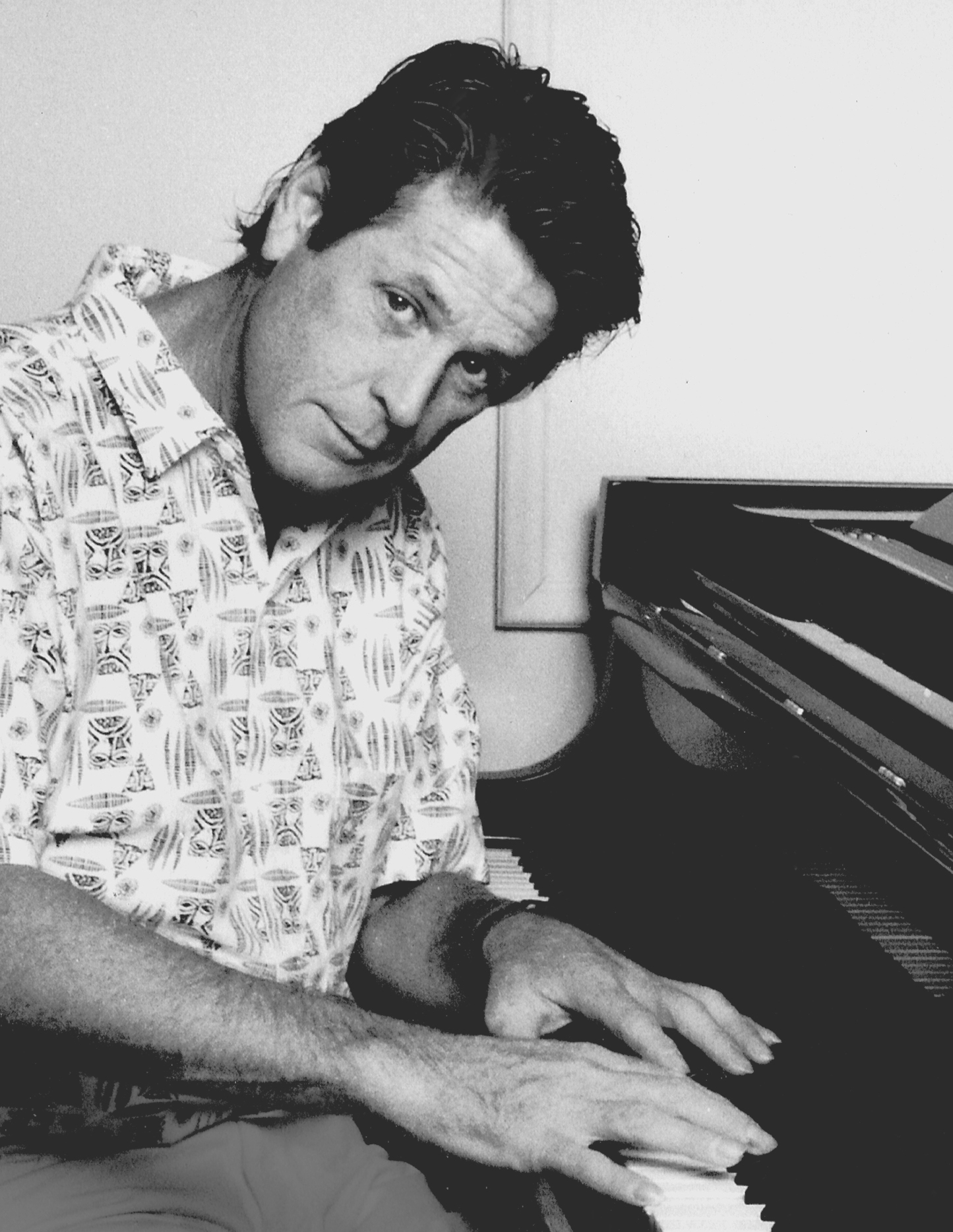
Brian Wilson

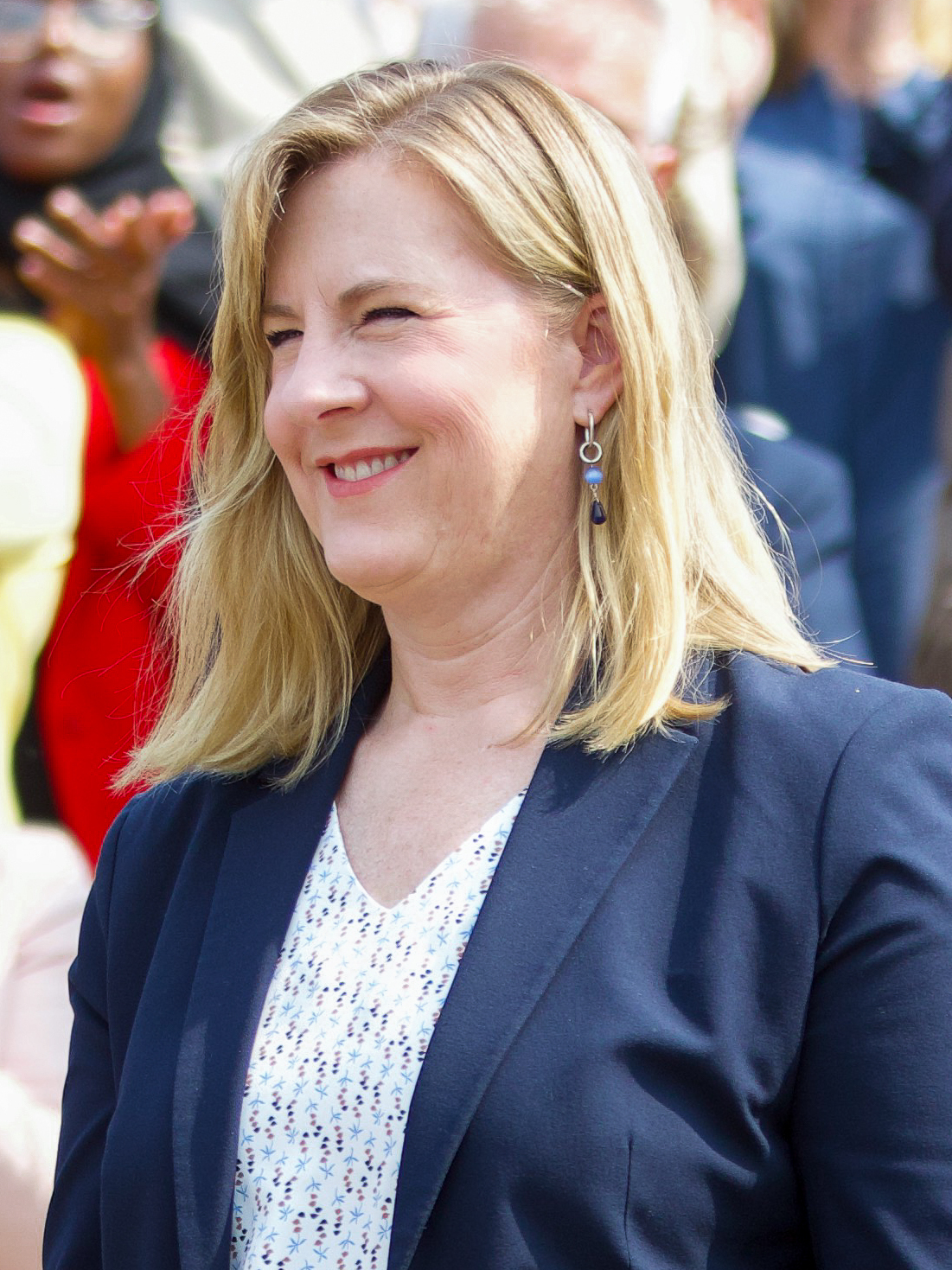
Melissa Hortman

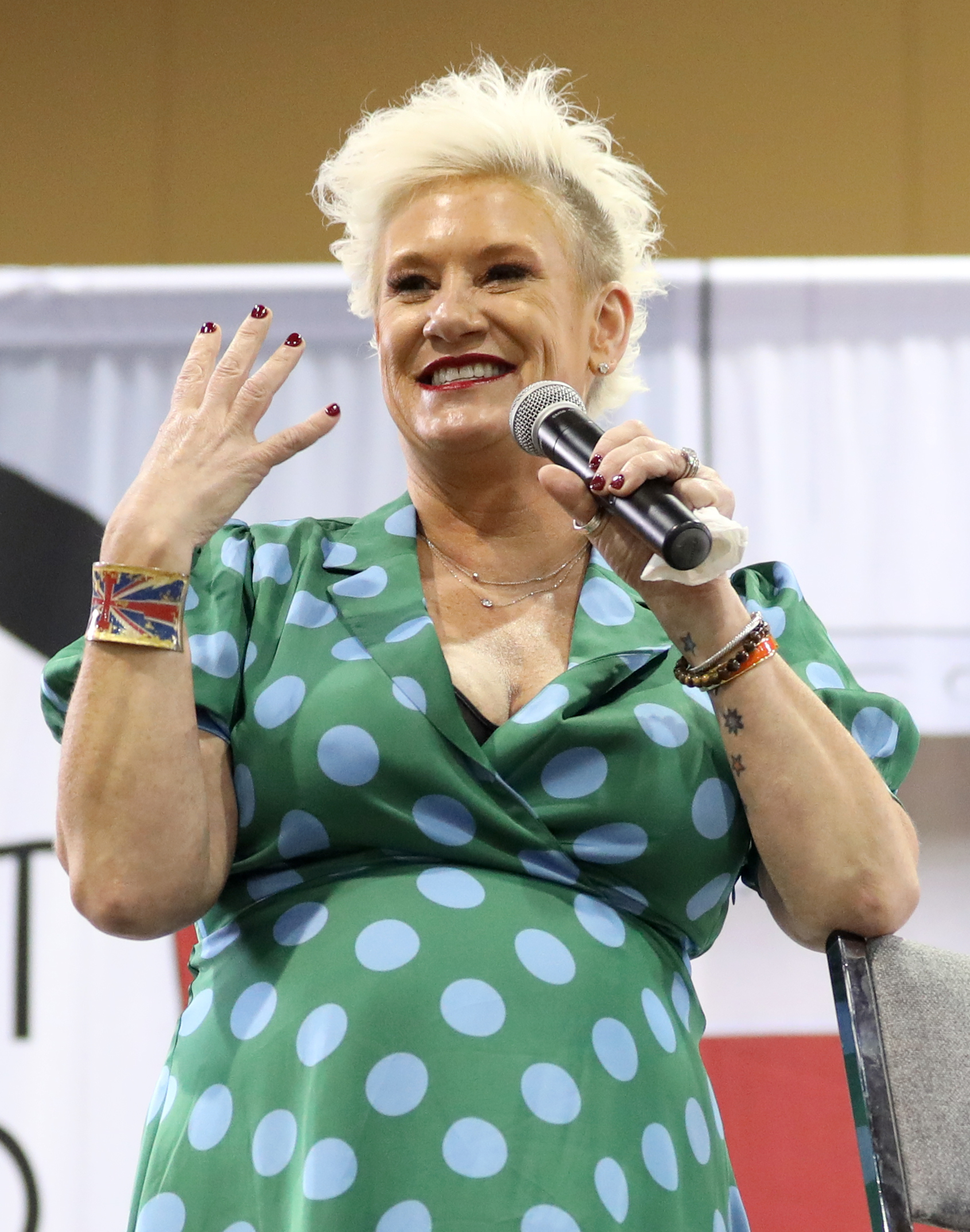
Anne Burrell

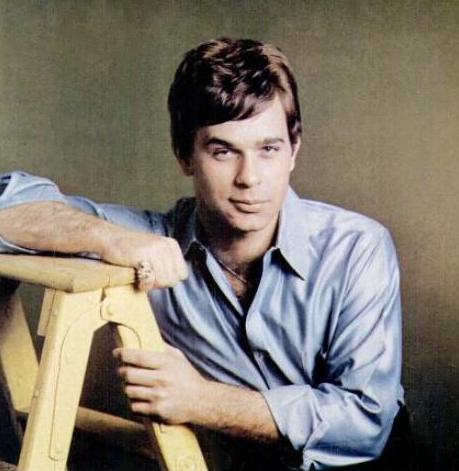
Lou Christie

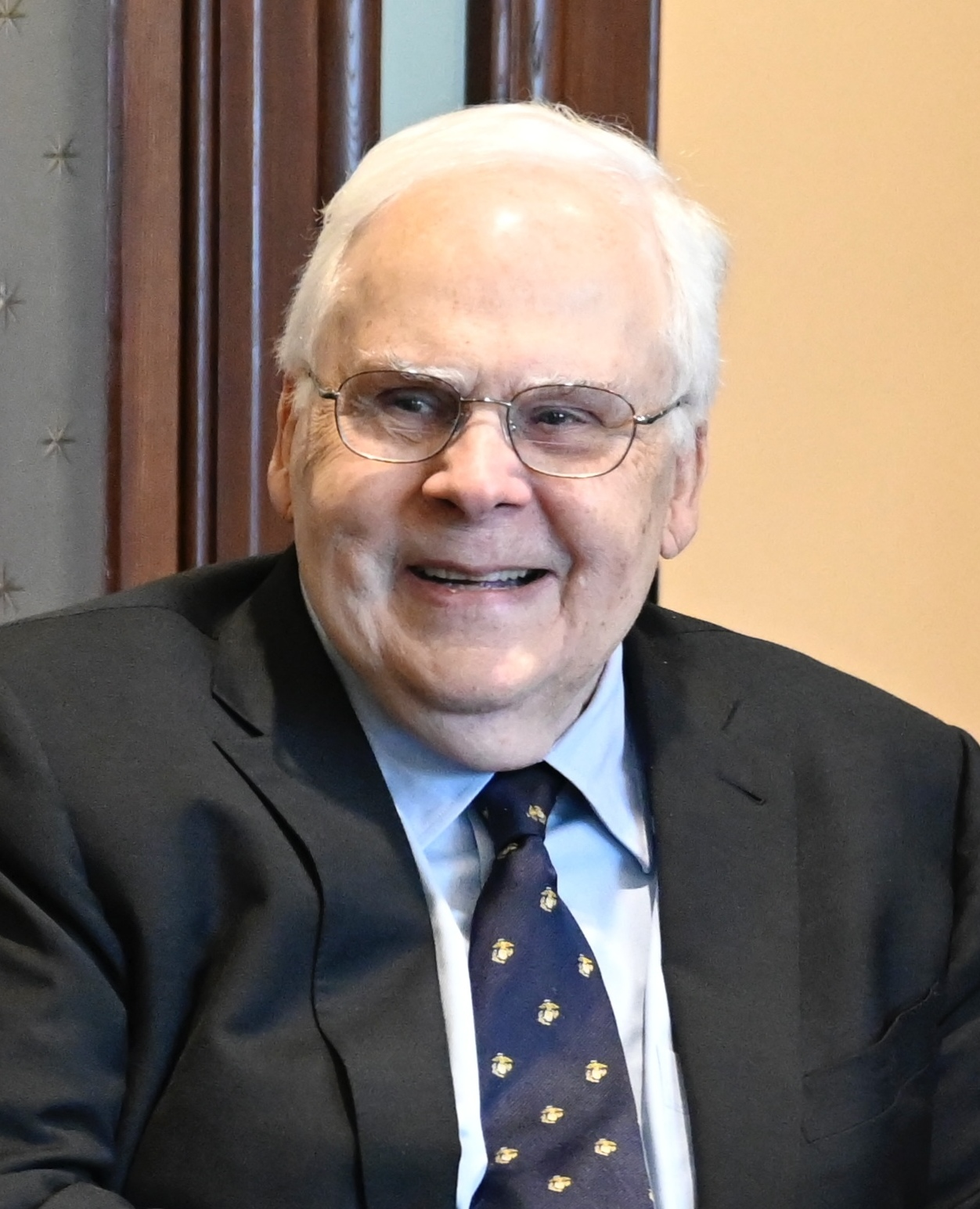
Frederick W. Smith

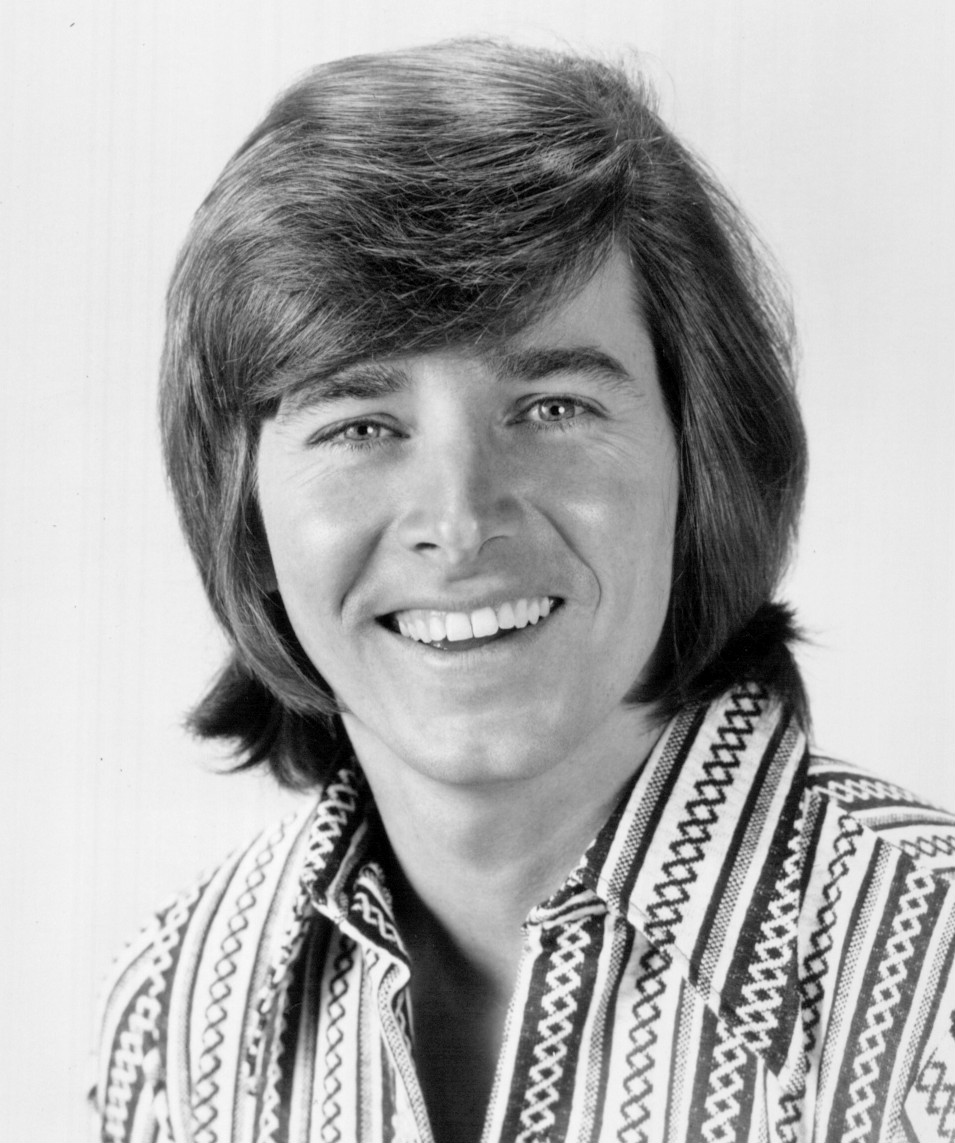
Bobby Sherman

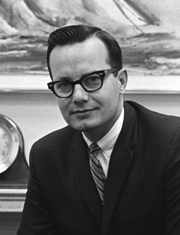
Bill Moyers

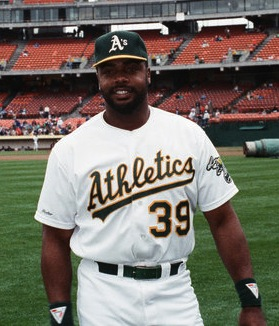
Dave Parker

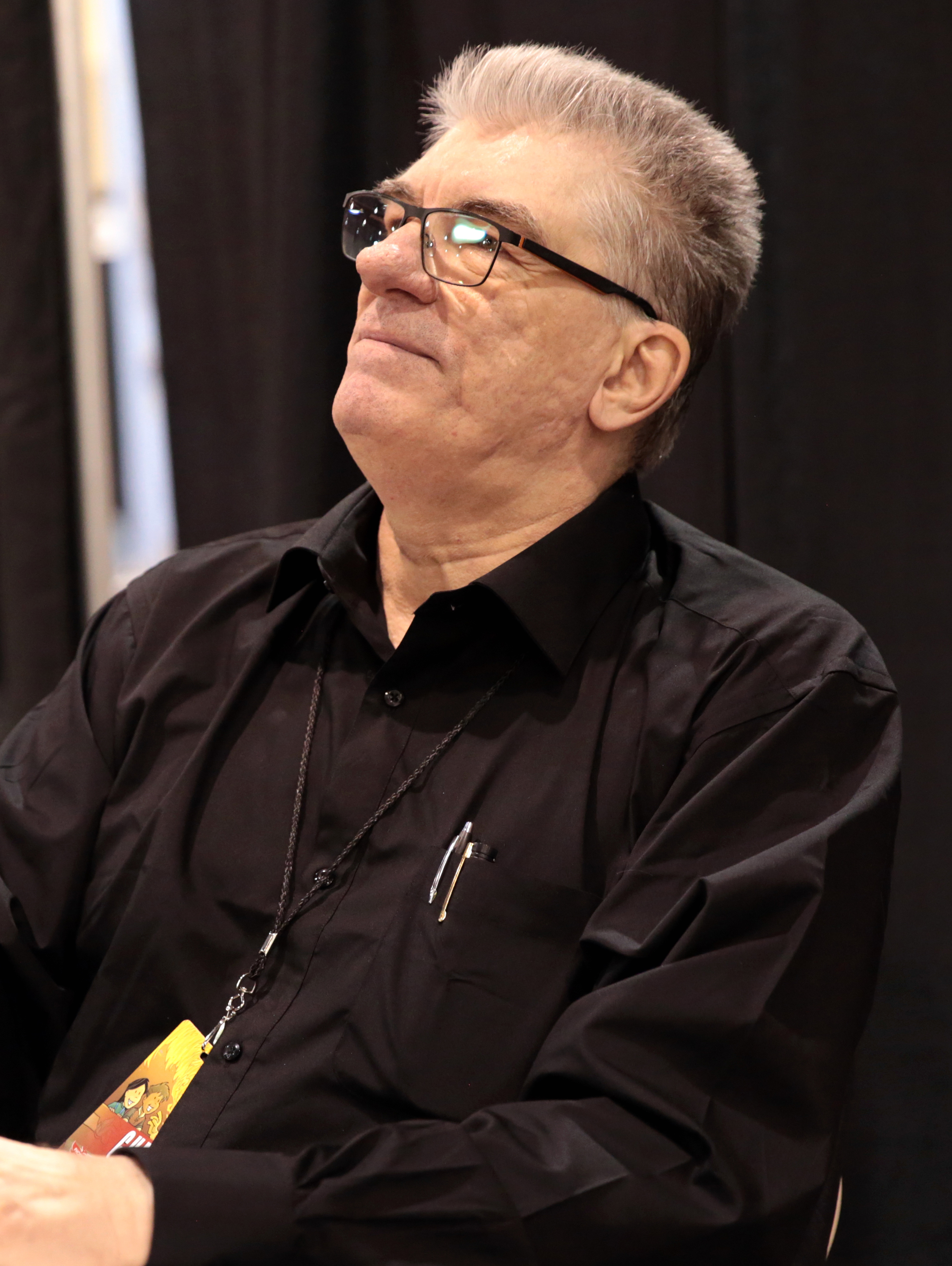
Jim Shooter

- June 1
  - Carl R. Ajello, 92, politician, attorney general of Connecticut (1975–1983) (b. 1932)
  - Fred Espenak, 71, astrophysicist (b. 1953)
  - John R. Gorman, 99, Roman Catholic prelate, auxiliary bishop of Chicago (1988–2003) (b. 1925)
  - Andy Johnson, 72, politician, member of the Florida House of Representatives (1979–1982) (b. 1953)
  - Jonathan Joss, 59, actor (King of the Hill, Parks and Recreation, The Magnificent Seven) (b. 1965)
  - Steve Wright, 82, football player (Green Bay Packers, New York Giants, Washington Redskins).
- June 2
  - Richard R. Eakin, 86, academic administrator, chancellor of East Carolina University (1987–2001) (b. 1938)
  - Morris Talansky, 92, businessman and rabbi (b. 1933)
- June 3
  - Doug Eggers, 94, football player (Baltimore Colts, Chicago Cardinals) (b. 1930)
  - Jim Marshall, 87, football player (Minnesota Vikings, Saskatchewan Roughriders, Cleveland Browns) (b. 1937)
  - Juliette Powell, 54, American-Canadian media expert (b. 1970)
  - Veda Louise Reed, 91, artist (b. 1934)
  - Edmund White, 85, writer (Nocturnes for the King of Naples, A Boy's Own Story, The Beautiful Room Is Empty) (b. 1940)
- June 4
  - Arthur Hamilton, 98, songwriter ("Cry Me a River") (b. 1926) (death announced on this date)
  - Jane Larkworthy, 62, beauty editor and journalist (The Cut, Air Mail) (b. 1962)
  - Mark Lomas, 76, football player (New York Jets) (b. 1948)
- June 5
  - Bill Atkinson, 74, computer engineer (b. 1951)
  - Walter Brueggemann, 92, Christian scholar and theologian (b. 1932)
  - Eddie Garcia, 65, football player (SMU, Green Bay Packers) (b. 1960)
  - Norman Hutchins, 62, gospel singer-songwriter (b. 1962)
  - Wayne Lewis, 68, singer (Atlantic Starr) and songwriter ("Always", "Secret Lovers") (b. 1956/1957)
  - Tom Rafferty, 70, football player (Dallas Cowboys) (b. 1954)
  - John Shulock, 76, baseball umpire (b. 1949)
- June 6
  - Jaraan Cornell, 48, basketball player (Purdue Boilermakers, Gary Steelheads) (b. 1976)
  - Renee Ferguson, 75, journalist (WBBM-TV, WMAQ-TV).
  - William C. Harrop, 96, diplomat, Inspector General of the Department of State (1983–1986), ambassador to Israel (1992–1993) and Zaire (1988–1991) (b. 1929)
  - Art Madrid, 90, politician, mayor of La Mesa, California (1990–2014) (b. 1934)
- June 8
  - Lawrence Eugene Brandt, 86, Catholic prelate, bishop of Greensburg (2004–2015) (b. 1939)
  - David Greenwood, 68, basketball player (Chicago Bulls, San Antonio Spurs, Detroit Pistons) (b. 1957)
  - Charles Miller, 85, politician, member of the Kentucky House of Representatives (1998–2023) (b. 1939)
- June 9
  - Constance Cumbey, 81, lawyer and Christian activist (b. 1944)
  - Barbara Holdridge, 95, recording executive, founder of Caedmon Records (b. 1929)
  - Chris Robinson, 86, actor (12 O'Clock High, General Hospital), director and screenwriter (b. 1938)
  - Sly Stone, 82, Hall of Fame singer (Sly and the Family Stone, "Thank You (Falettinme Be Mice Elf Agin)", "Everyday People") (b. 1943)
- June 10
  - Travis Carter, 75, racing crew chief (NASCAR) and team owner (Travis Carter Enterprises) (b. 1949)
  - Gary England, 85, meteorologist (KWTV), creator of the First Warning system (b. 1939)
  - Terry Louise Fisher, 79, television screenwriter and producer (L.A. Law, Cagney & Lacey) (b. 1946)
  - Elaine L. Jack, 97, Canadian-born author and LDS Church leader, president of the Relief Society (1990–1997) (b. 1928)
  - David H. Murdock, 102, food industry executive, owner of Castle & Cooke (since 1985) and Dole Food Company (since 2003) (b. 1923) (death announced on this date)
  - Doug Skaff, 48, politician, member of the West Virginia House of Delegates (2008–2014, 2018–2023) (b. 1976)
  - Harris Yulin, 87, actor (Scarface, Training Day, Ozark) (b. 1937)
- June 11
  - Stew Barber, 85, football player (Buffalo Bills) (b. 1939)
  - Ananda Lewis, 52, television host (MTV Live, Total Request Live) (b. 1973)
  - Brian Wilson, 82, singer-songwriter (The Beach Boys, "Good Vibrations") and record producer (Pet Sounds) (b. 1942) (death announced on this date)
- June 12
  - Nolen Ellison, 83, basketball player (Kansas Jayhawks) (b. 1941)
  - Charlie Gaddy, 93, anchorman (WRAL-TV) (b. 1931)
  - Peter Simone, 79, organized crime figure (b. 1945)
- June 13
  - Atul Butte, 55, medical researcher (b. 1970)
  - Betsy Gay, 96, actress (The Adventures of Tom Sawyer, Our Gang Follies of 1938) (b. 1929)
  - Johnny O'Brien, 94, baseball player (Pittsburgh Pirates, St. Louis Cardinals, Milwaukee Braves) (b. 1930)
  - John Robbins, 77, author (Diet for a New America) (b. 1947)
  - Stephen Stanko, 57, convicted murderer (b. 1968)
- June 14
  - Melissa Hortman, 55, politician, speaker (2019–2025) and member (since 2005) of the Minnesota House of Representatives, shot (b. 1970)
  - Ralph J. Lamberti, 90, politician, Staten Island borough president (1984–1989) (b. 1934)
  - Leonard Lauder, 92, cosmetics industry executive, CEO of The Estée Lauder Companies (1982–1999) (b. 1933)
  - Joel Shapiro, 83, sculptor (Untitled, Loss and Regeneration) (b. 1941)
  - Harold Tanner, 93, investment banker (b. 1932)
- June 15
  - Nina Kuscsik, 86, long-distance runner (b. 1939)
  - William Langewiesche, 70, author and journalist (The New York Times Magazine, The Atlantic) (b. 1955)
  - Thornton Willis, 89, abstract painter (b. 1936)
- June 16
  - Eric C. Bauman, 66, political operative, chair of the California Democratic Party (2017–2018) (b. 1958)
  - Patti Drew, 80, R&B singer ("Workin' On a Groovy Thing") (b. 1944)
  - Forbidden Apple, 30, Thoroughbred racehorse (b. 1995)
  - Daniel Kleppner, 92, physicist (b. 1932)
  - Mary Alice Dorrance Malone, 75, businesswoman, heiress to the Campbell's (b. 1950)
  - Patricia Peterson, 99, journalist and fashion editor (The New York Times) (b. 1926)
  - Dave Scott, 52, choreographer (You Got Served, Step Up 2: The Streets, So You Think You Can Dance) (b. 1972)
- June 17
  - Anne Burrell, 55, chef and television personality (Secrets of a Restaurant Chef, Worst Cooks in America, Iron Chef America) (b. 1969)
  - Charles Burrell, 104, classical and jazz bass player (b. 1920)
  - Clark Gruening, 82, lawyer and politician, member of the Alaska House of Representatives (1975–1979) (b. 1943)
  - Gailard Sartain, 78, actor (Hee Haw, The Buddy Holly Story, Mississippi Burning) (b. 1946)
- June 18
  - Malachi F. Anderson, 93, politician, member of the Maine House of Representatives (1987–1995) (b. 1931)
  - Lou Christie, 82, singer-songwriter ("Lightnin' Strikes", "Rhapsody in the Rain", "I'm Gonna Make You Mine") (b. 1943)
  - Tom Murphy, 89, Olympic middle-distance runner (1960) (b. 1935)
  - Marcia Resnick, 74, photographer (b. 1950)
  - Mike Rotkin, 79, politician, five-time mayor of Santa Cruz, California (b. 1945)
- June 19
  - Jack Betts, 96, actor (Sugar Colt, Gods and Monsters, Spider-Man) (b. 1929)
  - Bruce Hagen, 94, politician, North Dakota public service commissioner (1961–2000) (b. 1930)
  - Roger Haight, 89, Jesuit theologian, president of the Catholic Theological Society of America (1994–1995) (b. 1936)
  - James Leprino, 87, businessman (Leprino Foods) (b. 1937/1938)
  - Lynn Hamilton, 95, actress (Sanford and Son, The Waltons, Roots: The Next Generations) (b. 1930)
  - Frank Niceley, 78, politician, member of the Tennessee House of Representatives (1988–1992, 2005–2012) and Senate (2013–2025) (b. 1947)
  - Guy James Mangano, 95, politician and jurist, member of the New York State Assembly (1959–1962) and Senate (1963–1965), and New York Supreme Court (1968–2000) (b. 1935)
  - Arthur Ollie, 83, politician, member of the Iowa House of Representatives (1983–1997) (b. 1941)
  - Guido Tenesi, 71, ice hockey player (Hershey Bears) and actor (Slap Shot) (b. 1953)
  - Cavin Yarbrough, 71, musician (Yarbrough and Peoples) and songwriter ("Don't Stop the Music") (b. 1954)
- June 20
  - Joseph C. Canizaro, 88, real estate developer and philanthropist (b. 1937)
  - Blake Farenthold, 63, politician, member of the U.S. House of Representatives (2011–2018) (b. 1961)
  - Ivar Giaever, 96, physicist and engineer, Nobel Prize laureate (1973) (b. 1929)
  - Mikayla Raines, 30, YouTuber, wildlife rehabilitator, and founder of SaveAFox Rescue (b.1995)
- June 21
  - Frederick W. Smith, 80, businessman, founder of FedEx (b. 1944)
- June 22
  - Robert Z. Aliber, 94, economist (b. 1930)
  - Joe Marinelli, 68, actor (General Hospital, Santa Barbara, The Morning Show) (b. 1957)
- June 23
  - Rebekah Del Rio, 57, singer-songwriter and actress (b. 1967)
  - John Martin, 94, publisher, founder of Black Sparrow Press (b. 1930)
- June 24
  - Bobby Sherman, 81, actor (Here Come the Brides) and singer (b. 1943)
- June 25
  - Gerry Philbin, 83, football player (New York Jets, Philadelphia Eagles), Super Bowl champion (1969) (b. 1941) (death announced on this date)
  - Pat Williams, 87, politician, member of the U.S. House of Representatives from Montana (1979-1997) (b. 1937)
- June 26
  - Richard A. Boucher, 73, diplomat, spokesperson for the U.S. Department of State (1992–1993, 2001–2005) (b. 1951)
  - Rick Hurst, 79, actor (The Dukes of Hazzard, The Karate Kid Part III, Steel Magnolias) (b. 1946)
  - Carolyn McCarthy, 81, politician, member of the U.S. House of Representatives (1997–2015) (b. 1944)
  - Bill Moyers, 91, journalist, White House Press Secretary (1965–1967) (b. 1934)
  - Lalo Schifrin, 93, Argentine-born film and television composer (Mission: Impossible, Dirty Harry, Rush Hour), five-time Grammy Award winner (b. 1932)
  - Walter Scott, 81, singer (The Whispers) (b. 1943/1944)
- June 27
  - Catherine A. Costa, 99, politician, member of the New Jersey General Assembly (1982–1984) and Senate (1984–1990) (b. 1926)
  - Bill Dellinger, 91, middle-distance runner, Olympic bronze medalist (1964) (b. 1934)
  - Ed Mickelson, 98, baseball player (St. Louis Browns, Chicago Cubs) (b. 1926)
  - Jim Parkinson, 83, type designer (b. 1941)
  - Joseph Martin Sartoris, 97, Roman Catholic prelate, auxiliary bishop of Los Angeles (1994–2002) (b. 1927)
- June 28
  - D. Wayne Lukas, 89, Hall of Fame horse trainer (b. 1935)
  - Dave Parker, 74, baseball player (Pittsburgh Pirates, Cincinnati Reds, Oakland Athletics) (b. 1951)
- June 29
  - S. Daniel Abraham, 100, businessman (SlimFast) and philanthropist (b. 1924)
  - Mark Brokaw, 66–67, theatre director (How I Learned to Drive) (b. 1958)
  - Oliver Gibson, 53, football player (Pittsburgh Steelers, Cincinnati Bengals).
- June 30
  - Robert C. Dynes, 82, Canadian-born physicist, researcher and academic administrator (b. 1942)
  - Lucian Leape, 94, physician and academic (b. 1930)
  - Jim Shooter, 73, comic book writer (Secret Wars), editor-in-chief of Marvel Comics (1975–1978) (b. 1951)
