= I Make a Wish for a Potato =

Compilation album by the Holy Modal Rounders and Friends
- Released: April 10, 2001
- Recorded: 1975 – 1999
- Genre: Freak folk
- Length: 71:14
- Label: Rounder
- Producer: Bill Nowlin

The Holy Modal Rounders chronology
Too Much Fun! (1999)	I Make a Wish for a Potato (2001)	Live in 1965 (2003)

Professional ratings
Review scores
Source	Rating
AllMusic	4.5/5 stars
The Encyclopedia of Popular Music	4/5 stars
Entertainment Weekly	C+ / A
The Rolling Stone Album Guide	4.5/5 stars
The Village Voice	A

I Make a Wish for a Potato is a compilation album by psychedelic folk band the Holy Modal Rounders, released on April 10, 2001, through Rounder Records. The album draws from the band's three releases on Rounder Records and also includes songs by associated acts such as Michael Hurley as well as the Clamtones.

== Track listing ==
No.	Title	Writer(s)	Album	Length
1.	"Happy Rolling Cowboy"	Bob Nolan	Too Much Fun!	2:01
2.	"I'm Gettin' Ready to Go"	Michael Hurley	Snockgrass	3:52
3.	"Low Down Dog"	Peter Stampfel, Big Joe Turner	Alleged in Their Own Time	3:32
4.	"Rotten Lettuce"	Jeffrey Frederick	Spiders in the Moonlight	6:16
5.	"Bonaparte's Retreat"	Pee Wee King, Redd Stewart	Too Much Fun	2:04
6.	"Bad Boy"	Peter Stampfel	Too Much Fun	3:43
7.	"Random Canyon"	Peter Stampfel	Alleged in Their Own Time	4:00
8.	"You Got to Find Me"	Michael Hurley	Long Journey	4:02
9.	"Lazy Bones"	Jeff Frederick	Spiders in the Moonlight	3:05
10.	"Nova"	Peter Stampfel	Alleged in Their Own Time	3:32
11.	"Coldest Woman"	Traditional arr.	Going Nowhere Fast	1:45
12.	"Year of Jubilo"	Henry Clay Work	Too Much Fun!	2:17
13.	"Sweet Lucy"	Michael Hurley	Have Moicy!	4:04
14.	"Impossible Groove"	Peter Stampfel	Peter Stampfel & The Bottle Caps	5:16
15.	"Synergy"	Peter Stampfel	Alleged in Their Own Time	3:41
16.	"Robbin' Banks"	Jeffrey Frederick	Have Moicy!	3:59
17.	"Slurf Song"	Michael Hurley	Have Moicy!	3:17
18.	"Everything Must Go"	Peter Stampfel	Peter Stampfel & The Bottle Caps	4:33
19.	"Goodbye to Booze"	Traditional arr.	Going Nowhere Fast	3:07
20.	"She's More to Be Pitied"	Ruby Rakes	Alleged in Their Own Time	3:28
