= Jeffrey Frederick =

American musician

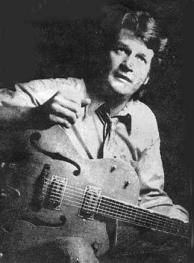

Background information
- Birth name: Jeffrey Sutton Frederick
- Born: Wilmington, Delaware, United States
- Origin: Vermont and Portland, United States
- Died: Portland, Oregon
- Genres: Alternative country, Americana, rock and roll
- Occupation(s): Songwriter, guitarist
- Instrument: Guitar
- Years active: 1960s – 1990s
- Labels: Frederick Productions, Rounder Records
- Website: www.jeffreyfrederick.com

Jeffrey Sutton Frederick (1950–1997) was a songwriter, guitarist and performer specializing in good-time Americana music—an idiosyncratic blend of folk, country and rock and roll. He was a largely uncredited predecessor of today's alternative country music genre. Also notorious for his pranks, he was a prodigious songwriter, specializing in sly, hilarious and soulful pieces. Frederick's tightly crafted songs and intricate guitar work were praised by the likes of Eric Clapton, and Dan Hicks. Jeffrey Frederick and the Clamtones (his best-known group) were inducted into the Oregon Music Hall of Fame on October 8, 2011.

== Early life ==
Born in Wilmington, Delaware, to highly religious parents, Harry and Edna Frederick, he spent most of his early years in rural Vermont. He went so far as to become an Eagle Scout, but quit the Scouts at age 14 to start his first band, the Renegades.

== Vermont ==
In the late 1960s Frederick, Jill Gross, Morgan Huber, John Raskin, and Robert Nickson (Froggy) established the original Clamtones band in Vermont. In the early 1970s, Frederick made some changes and started Automatic Slim & the Fat Boys (celebrated in Michael Hurley's song by the same name on his first Rounder Records album, Snockgrass). In addition to Frederick, the band consisted of his close friend, Michael Hurley (vocals, guitar, banjo), Doug Southworth (piano, guitar), and Melting Snow (Tom Hayes) (guitar).

Frederick developed many of his best-known songs during this period, such as "What Made My Hamburger Disappear" (which was borrowed by the TV program, Sesame Street, even though it is actually written from the perspective of somebody having a heart attack), "Robbin' Banks" (which Frederick claimed was written for his great-uncle, "Gentleman" Willie Sutton), "Stolen Guitar", and many others. His songs were almost invariably inspired by real people and events. For instance, during this period, in northern Vermont there was increasing tension between conservative rural and establishment Vermonters and the young "hipster" crowd. A corrupt undercover officer, Paul Lawrence, staged a fraudulent drug bust at a St. Albans tavern where Automatic Slim and The Fat Boys often played. As a consequence, the proprietor, Otto Kremer, lost the bar, was forced to plead guilty to a variety of narcotics crimes and leave the state within 72 hours (all charges were later overturned). These events inspired Frederick's song, "Poor Otto". They also helped convince Frederick to leave the area in which he had grown up.

== Portland ==
Frederick moved to Portland, Oregon, in 1975 at the urging of the Holy Modal Rounders' Robin Remaily. His singing partner, Jill Gross, joined him later that year, and together they started the Clamtones on the West Coast. In an unusual arrangement, the band performed as the Clamtones when Frederick was the frontman and as the Holy Modal Rounders when Steve Weber was frontman. These "two bands in one" often shared the same stage, with the Clamtones typically playing the opening and closing sets, as documented in Jeffrey Frederick and the Clamtones, B.C. and Steve Weber and the Holy Modal Rounders, B.C. (Frederick Productions). In addition to Frederick and Jill, the band consisted of Dave Reisch (bass and vocals), Robin Remaily (guitar and mandolin), Teddy Deane (horns and woodwinds), Richard Tyler (piano), and R. "Willy" North (drums). They soon gained the reputation of "the greatest... fucking bar band in America".

== Bicentennial tour ==
In 1976 the bands took off on a 9,000-mile Bicentennial tour of the perimeter of the United States. During this tour, Frederick was arrested in Texas for performing in a dress, and the band was escorted out of Alabama by the state police, for singing the irreligious gospel tune, "Let Me Down" ("Take these nails right out of my hands/And I swear you will get to the promised land/All your sins are forgiven/now let me down..."). During the tour, Frederick recorded Have Moicy! ("best album of the year," Village Voice, "the top folk album of the rock era," Rolling Stone Magazine) with Jill, Michael Hurley, Peter Stampfel, Paul Presti, Dave Reisch, Robin Remaily, Wax Iwaskiewicz and Robert Nickson. His contribution to this groundbreaking record is widely recognized. For example, rock critic Robert Christgau has described Frederick as "the secret hero of my beloved Have Moicy."

Frederick's only full-length solo studio album, Spiders in the Moonlight, was recorded in 1977 after the completion of the tour. Shortly thereafter, Frederick and Jill went back to Boston for a "short break", and Steve Weber and Robin Remaily went their own ways. Frederick came back to Portland alone and formed a new band, Les Clams. The lineup was Jeff, Dave Reisch, Roger North, Bruce Sweetman or Lex Browning (depending on who was around) and Michael Shade.

== Nevada ==
Les Clams rocked the area until Frederick moved to Silver City in the Comstock region of Nevada in 1983. There he gathered a group of northern Nevada musicians and formed the Jeffrey Frederick Band. The lineup consisted of Morgan Huber (bass, mandolin, piano, guitar), Willis Allen (keyboards); Sport Arnold (drums, vocals); Darius Javaher (clarinet, sax, guitar), Johnny Fingers Murdochi (lead guitar), B. B. Morse (later of Willie Nelson's band) (bass, vocals), Tommy Ward lap steel guitar, and the Horn Brothers, Dolph and Rookie Fisher (trombone and trumpet). The Jeffrey Frederick Band became wildly popular among the infamous saloons of Virginia City, the clubs of Reno and Lake Tahoe, and the bars of Dayton, Yerington and Fallon, Nevada.

== Later years ==
On New Year's Eve, 1983, Frederick married Kathryn Noel Bennett and informally adopted her children. Shortly after, Frederick and Kathryn acquired the infamous Dayton, Nevada saloon, The End Of The Trail. Owning the bar allowed Frederick to perform regularly while maintaining a stable family life. The Fredericks eventually wearied of running a bar, and Frederick returned to playing gigs, shuttling between Nevada and Portland. He was recording a new album with his Nevada band when he received a nearly fatal head injury in 1986. After a prolonged recuperation, he returned to writing and playing music as well as working a variety of jobs to help support his new family.

In 1996, the Fredericks moved back to Portland, Oregon. Frederick reformed the Clams and began working with old colleagues and new musicians such as Turtle Vandemarr (Christmas Jug Band, Anita Margarita and the Rattlesnakes, previously with Dan Hicks), Kevin "Bingo" Richey (Bingo Dream Band, Mojave Lords), and Jim Boyer (Freak Mountain Ramblers). Highly charismatic and an inveterate prankster, Frederick once again achieved near-legendary status both within and without the musical community. When he succumbed to liver failure (related to treatment for his head injury) in March 1997, Frederick's memorial service was attended by hundreds of mourners, including Portland's mayor. The local PBS television station, KOPB, played videotapes of his performances continuously all day. He was survived by his wife, Kathryn, her children Robyn and Paul Bennett, his son, Jake Ray, his sister, Eileen Gilander, and his parents. Videos of many of Jeff's performances are available on YouTube along with covers by the Freak Mountain Ramblers and an eclectic range of others.

"To Jeffrey it wasn't a successful show unless he 'made 'em dance' and he always had us dancing." Kathryn Frederick.

== Partial discography ==
- Have Moicy! (as Michael Hurley, The Unholy Modal Rounders, Jeffrey Frederick, & The Clamtones) (1976), Rounder Records
- Spiders In The Moonlight (1977), Rounder Records. Out of print, but a remastered and expanded version has been issued on CD as Resurrection of Spiders In The Moonlight (2007), Frederick Productions.
- I Make a Wish for a Potato (as "Holy Modal Rounders and Friends") (2003), Rounder Records
- Jeffrey Frederick Band, Live At The Icehouse (2003), Frederick Productions
- Oooh La La… Les Clams (2004), Frederick Productions
- Jeffrey Frederick, Clamtones B.C (2005), Frederick Productions
- St. Jeffrey's Day: The Songs of Jeffrey Frederick, Volume I (2008), Frederick Productions
- Ole' Bunny Brown; Jeffry Frederick & the Clamtones (2019), Frederick Productions/Red Newt Records
