= Bird Song: Live 1971 =

Live album by the Holy Modal Rounders
- Released: April 20, 2004
- Recorded: 1971
- Venues: Chess Mate, Detroit, Michigan
- Genre: Freak folk
- Length: 46:19
- Labels: Water, Don Giovanni
- Producer: Pat Thomas

The Holy Modal Rounders chronology
Live in 1965 (2003)	Bird Song: Live 1971 (2004)

Professional ratings
Review scores
Source	Rating
AllMusic	3/5 stars
Robert Christgau	(1-star Honorable Mention)
Rolling Stone	3.5/5 stars

Bird Song: Live 1971 is a live album by the psychedelic folk band the Holy Modal Rounders, released on April 20, 2004, through Water Records.

== Track listing ==
All songs are traditional, except where noted.

No.	Title	Writer(s)	Length
1.	"Low Down Dog"	Antonia	6:51
2.	"Catch Me"	Sam Shepard	5:59
3.	"Pink Underwear"	Robin Remaily	3:32
4.	"Boobs a Lot/Willie & the Hand Jive"	Johnny Otis, Steve Weber	6:31
5.	"Bird Song"	Antonia	4:02
6.	"Pollyanna (Go Sail Around the World) A.K.A. Claudette Ann"	Ted Deane	3:07
7.	"Give Me Your Money"	Robin Remaily	11:29
8.	"Smokey Joe's Cafe"	Jerry Leiber and Mike Stoller	4:51

== Personnel ==
The Holy Modal Rounders

- Peter Stampfel – fiddle, vocals
- Steve Weber – guitar, vocals

The Clamtones

- Ted Deane – saxophone, clarinet, flute
- Roger North – drums
- Dave Reisch – bass guitar
- Robin Remaily – mandolin, guitar, fiddle, vocals
- Richard Tyler – keyboards

Additional musicians and production

- Four Finger Lyd – design
- Gary Hobish – mastering
- Pat Thomas – production
