= Long Journey (album) =

Studio album by Michael Hurley
- Released: 1976
- Genre: Folk
- Label: Rounder

Michael Hurley chronology
Hi Fi Snock Uptown (1972)	Long Journey (1976)	Snockgrass (1980)

Long Journey is an album by the American musician Michael Hurley, released in 1976. It sold around 5,500 copies in its first three years of release. The album was reissued in 1998. "Hog of the Forsaken" was used in the television series Deadwood and Deadwood: The Movie.

== Production ==
Hurley was backed by the Redbirds, which included members of the Holy and Unholy Modal Rounders, and with Peter Stampfel on banjo. Hurley created the art for the album cover. "Hog of the Forsaken" is a tribute to a kind of mystical pig god. "Watchin' the Show" was added to the 1998 reissue.

== Critical reception ==
Professional ratings
Review scores
Source	Rating
All Music Guide to Country	5/5 stars
Robert Christgau	B+
Daily Press	3/5 stars
The Great Folk Discography	8/10
The New Rolling Stone Record Guide	4/5 stars
Spin Alternative Record Guide	9/10

The Daily Press said that the "uneven collection lacks even Hurley's skewed sense of consistency, but does contain two of his best songs ('Hog of the Forsaken' and 'The Portland Water')." The Gloucester County Times called the album "excellent" and praised the "lazy home-made feel". Robert Christgau labeled it "sardonic, charming, playful, cute, woozy, and only rarely dull."

The New Rolling Stone Record Guide admired the "brilliant descriptions of human acceptance of degradation as a neutral, even interesting, condition." In 1988, Spin said that Long Journey was "spiritually calming" and "friendly as a big plate of fried chicken". The Roanoke Times listed the 1998 reissue among the best albums of the year.

== Track listing ==
Side one

1. "Long Journey" – 2:42
2. "The Portland Water" – 3:36
3. "So You Say" – 3:16
4. "Reconciled to the Blues" – 2:53
5. "You Got to Find Me" – 3:58
6. "The 8-Ball Café" – 3:01
7. "Polynesia #1" – 2:17

Side two

1. "Monkey on the Interstate" – 1:08
2. "Whiskey Willey" – 3:59
3. "Panama Hat" – 3:41
4. "Why Should I Have to Worry?" – 1:44
5. "The Vt–Ore. Floor" – 3:56
6. "Hog of the Forsaken" – 3:26
7. "In the Garden" – 3:06
