= Live in 1965 =

Live album by The Holy Modal Rounders
- Released: January 21, 2003
- Recorded: 1965 at Chess Mate in Detroit, Michigan
- Genre: Freak folk
- Length: 44:55
- Label: DBK Works (original release); ESP-Disk (reissue); Don Giovanni (reissue)
- Producer: Tom Abbs

The Holy Modal Rounders chronology
I Make a Wish for a Potato (2001)	Live in 1965 (2003)	Bird Song: Live 1971 (2004)

Professional ratings
Review scores
Source	Rating
Allmusic	2/5 stars
Rolling Stone	3.5/5 stars

Live in 1965 a live album by psychedelic folk band The Holy Modal Rounders, released on January 21, 2003, through DBK Works.

== Track listing ==
All songs are traditional, except where noted.

No.	Title	Writer(s)	Length
1.	"Fishin' Blues"		2:58
2.	"Rum Mountain"		3:02
3.	"Hold the Woodpile Down"		3:08
4.	"Random Canyon"		2:56
5.	"Skin Game"	Steve Weber	1:53
6.	"Indian War Whoop"		3:01
7.	"Uncle Joe"		2:05
8.	"Flop Eared Mule"		3:21
9.	"Crowley Waltz"		1:59
10.	"Going to Memphis"	Johnny Cash, Holly Dew, Alan Lomax	2:51
11.	"Monday Morning"		2:55
12.	"Baltimore Fire"		3:49
13.	"Sugar in the Gourd"		2:15
14.	"Melinda"		3:31
15.	"My Mind Capsized"	Steve Weber	2:50
16.	"Black Eyed Suzy"		2:33

== Personnel ==
The Holy Modal Rounders

- Peter Stampfel – fiddle, banjo, vocals
- Steve Weber – guitar, vocals

Additional musicians and production

- Tom Abbs – production
- Miles Bachman – design
- Michael Sanzone – design
