= Come On Board =

Studio album by Jeffrey Lewis & Peter Stampfel
- Released: January 1, 2011
- Genre: Anti-folk
- Length: 45:37

Jeffrey Lewis & Peter Stampfel chronology
'Em Are I (2009)	Come On Board (2011)

Come On Board is the sixth album by anti-folk artist Jeffrey Lewis, and the first credited to Peter Stampfel and Jeffrey Lewis. Peter Stampfel was a founding member of American folk music band The Holy Modal Rounders. In an interview with Audio Antihero for GoldFlakePaint, Lewis revealed that a follow-up album was due in 2013.

== Track listing ==
- CD OJD-0307
1. "Come On Board"
2. "20,000 Leagues Under the Sea"
3. "Bottlecaps Are Cool"
4. "Busted"
5. "I Spent the Night In the Wax Museum"
6. "He's Been Everywhere"
7. "God, What Am I Doing Here?"
8. "Billy (Cross Over The Bamboo Field)"
9. "Love, Love, Love, Love"
10. "Gong Of Zero"
11. "Hoodoo Bash"
12. "Little Sister In The Sky"
13. "On We Went"
