= Too Much Fun! =

Studio album by the Holy Modal Rounders
- Released: July 13, 1999
- Studios: Studio at Puck's Farm, Ontario, Canada
- Genre: Freak folk
- Length: 43:00
- Label: Rounder
- Producers: Frazier Mohawk, Peter Stampfel

The Holy Modal Rounders chronology
Going Nowhere Fast (1981)	Too Much Fun! (1999)	I Make a Wish for a Potato (2001)

Too Much Fun! is a studio album by the psychedelic folk band the Holy Modal Rounders. It was released in 1999 through Rounder Records. It was the band's first album in more than two decades.

== Critical reception ==
Professional ratings
Review scores
Source	Rating
AllMusic	4/5 stars
Christgau's Consumer Guide	A
The Encyclopedia of Popular Music	3/5 stars
Rolling Stone	3.5/5 stars
(The New) Rolling Stone Album Guide	4/5 stars
Spin	8/10

Salon wrote that "essential to the fun of Too Much Fun! are the lack of second takes and the healthy helping of tomfoolery that disguises—or supplants—lyrics forgotten or never learned in the first place."

== Track listing ==
No.	Title	Writer(s)	Length
1.	"Happy Rolling Cowboy"	Bob Nolan	2:02
2.	"Antoinette"	Steve Weber	2:33
3.	"Bad Boy"	M. Myrie, Peter Stampfel	3:41
4.	"Violets So Blue"	Traditional arr.	2:55
5.	"Euphoria"	Robin Remaily	2:54
6.	"Sail Away Ladies"	Traditional arr.	1:44
7.	"Penny's Farm"	Traditional arr.	2:49
8.	"Bonaparte's Retreat"	Pee Wee King, Redd Stewart	2:05
9.	"Tea Song"	Michael Hurley	2:38
10.	"Precious Jewel"	Roy Acuff	3:32
11.	"A Blues Serenade"	Vincent Grande, Jimmy Lytell, Mitchell Parish, Frank Signorelli	2:17
12.	"Skin Game"	Traditional arr.	2:25
13.	"Long Journey"	Traditional arr., Michael Hurley	1:57
14.	"Crowley Waltz"	Hackberry Ramblers	1:43
15.	"Little Girl and the Dreadful Snake"	Bill Monroe	3:05
16.	"Year of Jubilo"	Henry Clay Work	2:15
17.	"New John the Revelator"	Blind Willie Johnson	2:41

== Personnel ==
The Holy Modal Rounders

- Dave Reisch – bass guitar, vocals
- Don Rooke – slide guitar
- Peter Stampfel – fiddle, banjo, guitar, mandolin, vocals, production
- Steve Weber – guitar, vocals

Additional musicians and production

- David B. Greenberger – design
- Frazier Mohawk – production
- Dr. Toby Mountain – mastering
- Phil Sheridan – engineering, mastering
- Betsy Wollheim – photography
- Jeff Wolpert – engineering
