= Clamtones =

American folk rock group

- Origin: Portland, Oregon, United States
- Past members: Jeffrey Frederick; Jill Gross; Robin Remaily; Richard Tyler; Dave Reisch; Ted Deane; Roger North

Clamtones was an American folk rock group, and Jeffrey Frederick's most notable band. The best-known incarnation of the band formed in 1975 when Frederick and Jill Gross moved to Portland, Oregon and began playing with the backing band of the Holy Modal Rounders. Although the Clamtones only recorded one studio album, they were a popular act in the Portland music scene. They were inducted into the Oregon Music Hall of Fame in 2011, with the organization noting that the Clamtones "developed a reputation for being 'one of the best bar bands in the country.'"

== History ==
In the late 1960s, Jeffrey Frederick formed the first Clamtones with Jill Gross, Morgan Huber, John Raskin, and Robert Nickson. However, the more notable incarnation was formed in 1975 when Frederick moved to Portland, Oregon. The Holy Modal Rounders, who at this time consisted of Steve Weber (guitar and vocals), Robin Remaily (guitar and mandolin), Richard Tyler (piano), Dave Reisch (bass), Ted Deane (saxophone), and Roger North (drums), had moved to Portland in 1972. Without Weber, the Rounders began backing up Frederick and Gross as the Clamtones. However, they continued to play with Weber as the Holy Modal Rounders.

Not long after they formed, Frederick, Gross, and the Clamtones recorded the collaborative 1976 studio album Have Moicy! with Michael Hurley and Peter Stampfel's the Unholy Modal Rounders. In 1977, they released their only studio album Spiders In The Moonlight. Some of the tracks from that album and from Have Moicy! were included in the 2003 Rounder compilation album, I Make A Wish For A Potato. In 2007, the original album was digitally remastered as Resurrection of Spiders In The Moonlight with the addition of three studio tracks from the later Jeffrey Frederick Band. In 1977, when they returned to the East Coast for a funeral, Weber and the Clamtones (without Frederick and Gross) reunited with Peter Stampfel and recorded the 1978 studio album Last Round as the Holy Modal Rounders.

The members of the Clamtones continued to play with Weber as the Rounders until 1995 when Weber moved back to the East Coast. In 1997, Frederick died. Starting in 1996, the members of the Clamtones backed up reunions between Weber and Stampfel until the Holy Modal Rounders broke up for the last time in 2003. Jeffrey Frederick and the Clamtones were inducted into the Oregon Music Hall of Fame on October 8, 2011.

== Discography ==
- Jeffrey Frederick and the Clamtones, Spiders In The Moonlight (Rounder, 1977). An expanded version is available on CD, billed as Resurrection of Spiders In The Moonlight (Frederick Productions, 2007)
- Jeffrey Frederick and the Clamtones, Clamtones B.C. (Frederick Productions, 2005)
