= Good Taste Is Timeless =

Album by The Holy Modal Rounders

Studio album by the Holy Modal Rounders
- Released: January 1971
- Genre: Psychedelic folk
- Length: 36:30
- Label: Metromedia
- Producer: Bob Dorough

The Holy Modal Rounders chronology
The Moray Eels Eat The Holy Modal Rounders (1968)	Good Taste Is Timeless (1971)	Alleged in Their Own Time (1975)

Professional ratings
Review scores
Source	Rating
AllMusic	3/5 stars
Christgau's Record Guide	B+

Good Taste Is Timeless is the fifth studio album by the psychedelic folk band the Holy Modal Rounders, released in 1971 through Metromedia Records.

== Track listing ==
Side one
No.	Title	Writer(s)	Lead vocals	Length
1.	"Once a Year"	McCarty	McCarty	2:10
2.	"Black Bottom"	Antonia, Stampfel, Weber	Stampfel	2:45
3.	"Happy Scrapple Daddy Polka"	Remaily	Remaily	2:17
4.	"Spring of '65"	Stampfel	Stampfel	5:52
5.	"Livin' Off the Land"	Antonia, Stampfel	Stampfel	2:16
6.	"Love Is the Closest Thing"	Hurley	Remaily	2:16

Side two
No.	Title	Writer(s)	Lead vocals	Length
1.	"Boobs a Lot"	Weber	Weber	2:52
2.	"Melinda"	Maphis	Stampfel	2:26
3.	"Generalonely"	Weber	Weber	4:09
4.	"Alligator Man"	Floyd Chance, Jimmy C. Newman	Annas	2:33
5.	"City Blues"	Remaily	Remaily, Stampfel	4:18
6.	"The Whole World Oughta Go on a Vacation"	Remaily	Remaily	2:59

== Personnel ==
The Holy Modal Rounders

- John Wesley Annas – bass guitar, kazoo, jug, vocals
- Michael McCarty – drums, percussion, tambourine, cowbell, vocals
- Robin Remaily – mandolin, violin, guitar, clarinet, jew's harp, vocals
- Peter Stampfel – violin, banjo, vocals, photography
- Steve Weber – guitar, vocals

Additional musicians and production

- Bob Dorough – production
- Pete Drake – steel guitar on "Once a Year" and "Love Is the Closest Thing"
- D. J. Fontana – tambourine on "Black Bottom", percussion on "Alligator Man"
- Al Gore – engineering
- Michael Hurley – illustration
- Bob Irwin – mastering
- Scotty Moore – engineering
- Tracy Nelson – additional vocals on "Love Is the Closest Thing"
- Jayme Pieruzzi – mastering
- Ed Rice – mixing
- Eric Schou – design
- The Sundazed Archive – photography
- Richard Tyler – piano, organ
