= Lord Lundy =

Lord Lundy may refer to:

- Lord William, a traditional Scottish ballad
- Lord Lundy, one of the Cautionary Tales for Children by Hilaire Belloc
