= I Wish I Was a Mole in the Ground =

"'I Wish I Was a Mole In the Ground'"

Song by Bascom Lamar Lunsford
- Released: 1928
- Genre: Roots and Folk music
- Label: Brunswick Records
- Songwriter(s): traditional

"I Wish I Was a Mole in the Ground" (Roud 4957, sometimes titled "Mole in the Ground" or "Kimbie") is a traditional American folk song. It was most famously recorded by Bascom Lamar Lunsford in 1928 for Brunswick Records in Ashland, Kentucky. Harry Smith included "I Wish I Was a Mole in the Ground" on his Anthology of American Folk Music released by Folkways Records in 1952. The notes for Smith's Anthology state that Lunsford learned this song from Fred Moody, a North Carolina neighbor, in 1901.

== Song ==
Lunsford said of this song:

The title of this mountain banjo song is "I Wish I Was A Mole In The Ground." I've known it since 1901 when I heard Fred Moody, then a high school boy, sing it down in Burke County. Fred lives in Haywood County, North Carolina, and the footnote to the song is that the "bend" referred to is the bend of the Pigeon River in Haywood County, North Carolina. I played it as a request of my mother back in 1902. It was the last request she ever made of me. I was teaching that time at Doggett's Gap at public school in Madison County, and returned to my school on Sunday evening. She was interested in my picking the banjo, and she asked me to get the five-string banjo down and play "I Wish I Was A Mole In The Ground." I went away, and she grew sick and passed away and that was the last request she ever made of me.

In his notes for "I Wish I Was a Mole in the Ground", supplied with the Anthology in 1952, Smith disagrees about the meaning of "The Bend" when he wrote:

The narrator's wish to be a mole in the ground and a lizzard [sic] in the spring are quite surrealistic in their symbolism. "The Bend" ("pen" in some other versions) probably refers to the Big Bend penitentiary. In an earlier version of this song (Okeh, 1925) the banjo is even more remarkable in its halting rhythms, and the singer decided he would "rather be a lizzard [sic]..." Lunsford, a lawyer of Asheville, North Carolina, writes that this song is a typical product of the Pigeon River Valley.

Lunsford considered himself an archivist and never took credit for this song or any songs he recorded. He traveled the western mountains of North Carolina and learned this song from the "locals" as it was his goal and passion to archive songs that he heard growing up for historical reference.

The song has been recorded by other performers. The song is sometimes known by one of its verses, "Tempie let your hair roll down", and is the basis for the campfire song "I Wish I Was a Little Bar of Soap". Natalie Wood sings two verses of the song in the 1947 film, Driftwood.

Bob Dylan, who listened to Smith's Anthology, echoed a line from this song; "'Cause a railroad man they'll kill you when he can/And drink up your blood like wine," as recorded in Lunsford's "I Wish I Was a Mole in the Ground", is echoed by Dylan's verse "Mona tried to tell me/To stay away from the train line/She said that all the railroad men/Just drink up your blood like wine" on his song "Stuck Inside of Mobile With the Memphis Blues Again" on the album Blonde on Blonde, recorded in 1966.

== Literature ==
The song is mentioned by Salman Rushdie's character Ormus in his work The Ground Beneath Her Feet.

In his book Lipstick Traces: A Secret History of the 20th Century, the author Greil Marcus writes of Lunsford's recording of the song:

Now what the singer wants is obvious, and almost impossible to comprehend. He wants to be delivered from his life and to be changed into a creature insignificant and despised. He wants to see nothing and to be seen by no-one. He wants to destroy the world and to survive it. That’s all he wants. The performance is quiet, steady, and the quiet lets you in...You can imagine what it would be like to want what the singer wants. It is an almost impossible negation, at the edge of pure nihilism, a demand to prove that the world is nothing, a demand to be next to nothing and yet it is comforting.

Marcus comments on the song as a precursor to the music Bob Dylan and The Band recorded in Woodstock in 1967; Marcus also discussed "I Wish I Was a Mole in the Ground" in his liner notes for The Basement Tapes, released by Columbia Records in 1975.

== Recordings ==
- Bascom Lamar Lunsford on Anthology of American Folk Music Smithsonian Folkways 1952
- Cisco Houston
- Patrick Sky Two Steps Forward, One Step Back
- Michael Cooney "Singer of Old Songs" (1975)
- Jackson C. Frank on his self-titled album Jackson C. Frank (1965). The song is credited under the title of "Kimbie"
- Steve Suffet on his CD Now the Wheel Has Turned (2005).
- Charlie Parr on his 2002 album 1922
- DJ /rupture feat. Sindhu Zagoren on 2004 CD Special Gunpowder [Tigerbeat6]
- ANBB (Alva Noto & Blixa Bargeld) on 2010 EP Ret Marut Handshake and album Mimikry
- The Holy Modal Rounders on The Holy Modal Rounders 2 Prestige 1965
- John Francis Flynn on Look Over The Wall, See The Sky
- Marianne Faithfull on the 2008 album Easy Come, Easy Go. The song is titled "Kimbie"

There are about 40 more recorded versions listed in Jane Keefer's internet Folk Music Index.

== Published versions ==
- Rise Up Singing, p. 147
