= The Holy Modal Rounders 2 =

Studio album by the Holy Modal Rounders
- Released: 1965
- Genre: Old-time
- Length: 27:44
- Label: Prestige
- Producer: Larry Schreiber

The Holy Modal Rounders chronology
| The Holy Modal Rounders (1964) | The Holy Modal Rounders 2 (1965) | Indian War Whoop (1967) |

Professional ratings
Review scores
| Source | Rating |
|---|---|
| AllMusic | 3/5 stars |

The Holy Modal Rounders 2 is the second studio album by the folk duo the Holy Modal Rounders, released in 1965 through Prestige Records.

For the 1965 release, the duo's original track sequencing was changed much to their disapproval. All traditional folk songs were on one side and their experimental ones on the other. The tracks would be returned to their proper sequencing along with two bonus tracks on the 1999 CD re-release, 1 & 2.

== Track listing ==
Side one
| No. | Title | Writer(s) | Length |
|---|---|---|---|
| 1. | "Flop Eared Mule" | Traditional | 2:15 |
| 2. | "Black Eyed Susie" | Traditional | 1:30 |
| 3. | "Sail Away Ladies" | Traditional | 2:35 |
| 4. | "Clinch Mountain Backstep" | The Stanley Brothers | 2:00 |
| 5. | "Fishing Blues" | Henry Thomas | 1:38 |
| 6. | "Statesboro Blues" | Blind Willie McTell | 1:34 |
| 7. | "Junko Partner" | Michael Hurley, Weber | 1:05 |

Side two
| No. | Title | Writer(s) | Length |
|---|---|---|---|
| 1. | "Mole in the Ground" | Traditional | 2:43 |
| 2. | "Hot Corn, Cold Corn" | Bill Monroe | 2:06 |
| 3. | "Down the Old Plank Road" | Uncle Dave Macon | 2:00 |
| 4. | "Chevrolet Six" | Frank Hutchison | 1:56 |
| 5. | "Crowley Waltz" | Hackberry Ramblers | 1:30 |
| 6. | "Bully of the Town" | Vernon Dalhart | 2:56 |

== Personnel ==
The Holy Modal Rounders

- Peter Stampfel – fiddle, banjo, vocals
- Steve Weber – guitar, vocals

Additional musicians and production

- Don Schlitten – photography, illustration
- Larry Schreiber – production
- Samuel Charters – production supervision
