= Last Round =

Studio album by the Holy Modal Rounders
- Released: 1978
- Recorded: The Workshop, Douglaston, New York
- Genre: Folk
- Length: 36:22
- Label: Adelphi
- Producer: Betty Berkin, Robin Remaily, Peter Stampfel, Steve Weber

The Holy Modal Rounders chronology
Have Moicy! (1976)	Last Round (1978)	Going Nowhere Fast (1981)

Last Round is a studio album by the American musical group the Holy Modal Rounders. It was released in 1978 through Adelphi Records.

== Critical reception ==
Professional ratings
Review scores
Source	Rating
AllMusic	4/5 stars
Christgau's Record Guide	B+
The Encyclopedia of Popular Music	2/5 stars
(The New) Rolling Stone Album Guide	3.5/5 stars

The Lincoln Journal Star deemed the album "pleasant, amusing, [and] pretty insignificant," noting that "this is where all the hippies went, in case you'd missed them." Newsday called it "wacky hippie folk music that is often pleasingly salty and sardonic."

== Track listing ==
Side one
No.	Title	Writer(s)	Lead vocals	Length
1.	"Euphoria"	Remaily	Weber	3:12
2.	"Poison Sugar"	Stampfel	Berkin, Stampfel	2:22
3.	"Oriental Lady"	Stampfel	Stampfel	2:23
4.	"The Cold Roll"	Remaily	Remaily	3:07
5.	"That Belly I Idolize"	Antonia	Weber	3:58
6.	"August 1967"	Stampfel	Stampfel, Weber	3:57

Side two
No.	Title	Writer(s)	Lead vocals	Length
1.	"If You Want to Be a Bird/Wild Blue Yonder"	Antonia	Stampfel	3:13
2.	"Pink Underwear"	Remaily	Remaily	3:54
3.	"God, What Am I Doing Here?"	Antonia	Stampfel	3:09
4.	"Sweet William"	Traditional arr.	Stampfel	3:05
5.	"Romping Through the Swamp"	Stampfel	Stampfel	2:30
6.	"Silly Boys"	Remaily	Remaily	3:32

== Personnel ==
The Holy Modal Rounders

- Peter Stampfel – fiddle, banjo, vocals, design
- Steve Weber – guitar, vocals, bass guitar

The Clamtones

- Ted Deane – saxophone, clarinet, flute
- Dave Reisch – bass guitar
- Roger North – drums
- Robin Remaily – mandolin, guitar, steel guitar, piano, fiddle, vocals
- Richard Tyler – piano

Additional musicians and production

- Candace – design
- Betty Berkin – vocals on "Poison Sugar"
- Kevin Kelly – engineering
- Jeff Kracke – engineering
- George Marino – mastering
- Barbara Mathe – design
- Charlie Messing – guitar on "If You Want to Be a Bird/Wild Blue Yonder"
- Trudy Rosen – photography
- Bob Sasson – photography
