= The Moray Eels Eat The Holy Modal Rounders =

The Moray Eels Eat the Holy Modal Rounders

Studio album by the Holy Modal Rounders
- Released: 1968
- Genre: Psychedelic folk
- Length: 26:24
- Label: Elektra
- Producer: Frazier Mohawk

The Holy Modal Rounders chronology
Indian War Whoop (1967)	The Moray Eels Eat the Holy Modal Rounders (1968)	Good Taste Is Timeless (1971)

The Moray Eels Eat the Holy Modal Rounders is the fourth studio album by the folk band the Holy Modal Rounders, released in 1968 through Elektra Records. Since its release, the album has received positive reviews and its opener, "Bird Song," was notably included in the 1969 film Easy Rider.

== Background and Recording ==
Before the album's recording, the Holy Modal Rounders were effectively broken up. After their brief stint with the Fugs in 1965, Peter Stampfel and Steve Weber worked separately and had only reunited for the recording of 1967's Indian War Whoop and two gigs. Stampfel himself was working with a new band, the Moray Eels, who ultimately inspired the name of the album. The group included his girlfriend Antonia (who co-wrote some of the songs for the album), Sam Shepard on drums, Richard Tyler on piano, and John Annis on bass.

Despite the band's lack of activity, Elektra producer Frazier Mohawk, a fan of the group, approached the duo to record a new album. Although Stampfel was reluctant to record with Weber again, the Moray Eels were signed to Elektra with the stipulation that Weber would join the recordings. The album's recording took place in California, where the band briefly relocated. Although Stampfel emphasized to Mohawk the need to force Weber to practice beforehand, rehearsals did not occur and the band ultimately entered the studio without a clear idea of what songs they were going to record. Sessions quickly became unorganized and both the band and Mohawk used an excessive amount of drugs throughout the album's recording.

The album was mixed without Stampfel in attendance. The engineers decided to make the album more "psychedelic" by not including grooves in between songs, much to the chagrin of Stampfel, who noted the songs would no longer have radio potential. Ultimately, "Bird Song" received some airplay because it was the first song on the album.

After the recording of the album, the Moray Eels and Weber reformed the Holy Modal Rounders. While in California, the Rounders performed some of the most notable shows of their career, opening for Pink Floyd in August in San Francisco, opening for Ike and Tina Turner in Los Angeles, and performing a set on the sketch comedy television show Rowan & Martin's Laugh-In in October.

== Reception ==
Professional ratings
Review scores
Source	Rating
AllMusic	4.5/5 stars
The Rolling Stone Album Guide (2004)	3.5/5 stars

Mike Bourne, in a contemporary review of The Moray Eels in The Spectator (a student newspaper at Indiana University Bloomington), wrote that "the Rounders are ungodly isane in approach, nihilistic even, destroying every convention, every sense, as they constantly laugh at each other and at us for listening to what should be tripe. Yet as honest tripe, knocked as it knocks, The Rounders build a degenerate party we are perhaps all too willing to join."

Music critic Billy Altman, writing for the 1983 edition of The Rolling Stone Album Guide, highlighted The Moray Eels as the band's best album and bemoaned that it was (at the time) out of print. However, in the fourth edition of The Rolling Stone Album Guide, critic Tom Hull re-evaluated both Indian War Whoop and The Moray Eels as "curiosities, conceived as psychedelia and sloppily executed" and gave The Moray Eels a three-and-a-half star rating.

Ritchie Unterberger, who wrote the liner notes for the 2002 reissue, regarded "Half a Mind" as rivaling "some of Syd Barrett's solo work" as well as describing the album as "a triumph, a melange of mind-melting acid folk that might have hung together by a thread, but was usually exhilarating, with a cracked, brain-damaged mystique all its own." Al Campbell of AllMusic positively reviewed the album's highlights as "otherworldly compositions" and that the album was "unabashed in its own eccentricity."

Stampfel does not regard the album in the highest esteem. He noted it reflected the music taste of Mohawk more so than of the Holy Modal Rounders and that the excessive drug use and Weber's refusal to rehearse led to the album being a mixed bag.

== Popular culture ==
"Bird Song" was featured in the 1969 film Easy Rider, directed by Dennis Hopper. The song caught the attention of Peter Fonda who heard it on the radio and thought it would be a perfect fit for the movie. The melody is lifted from Ray Price's "You Done Me Wrong" from 1956.

The American band Space Needle named their second album The Moray Eels Eat the Space Needle in reference to the album title.

== Track listing ==
Side one
No.	Title	Length
1.	"Bird Song"	2:14
2.	"One Will Do for Now"	1:22
3.	"Take-Off Artist Song"	2:36
4.	"Werewolf"	3:40
5.	"Interlude"	0:48
6.	"Dame Fortune"	2:56

Side two
No.	Title	Length
1.	"Mobile Line"	3:19
2.	"The Duji Song"	0:22
3.	"My Mind Capsized"	2:46
4.	"The STP Song"	1:12
5.	"Interlude 2"	1:41
6.	"Half a Mind"	2:23
7.	"The Pledge"	1:05
Total length:		26:23

== Personnel ==
The Holy Modal Rounders

- Sam Shepard – percussion
- Peter Stampfel – banjo, electric violin, vocals
- Richard Tyler – piano
- Steve Weber – guitar, vocals

Additional musicians and production

- William S. Harvey – art direction
- Bob Labla – engineering
- Robin Labla – engineering
- Frazier Mohawk – production
- John Wesley Annis – bass guitar & drums

== Release history ==
Region	Date	Title	Label	Format	Catalog
USA	1968	The Moray Eels Eat The Holy Modal Rounders	Elektra	Stereo LP	EKS-74026
Netherlands	1968	The Moray Eels Eat The Holy Modal Rounders	Elektra	Stereo LP	EKS-74026
Germany	1968	The Moray Eels Eat The Holy Modal Rounders	Elektra	Stereo LP	EKS-74026
Australia	1968	The Moray Eels Eat The Holy Modal Rounders	Elektra	Stereo LP	LIK 29
UK	1969	The Moray Eels Eat The Holy Modal Rounders	Elektra	Mono LP	EKL 4026
UK	1969	The Moray Eels Eat The Holy Modal Rounders	Elektra	Stereo LP	EKS 4026
Italy	2002	The Moray Eels Eat The Holy Modal Rounders	Sundazed Music	Stereo LP	LP 5126
USA	2002	The Moray Eels Eat The Holy Modal Rounders	Water	CD	water101
EU	2018	The Moray Eels Eat The Holy Modal Rounders	Wounded Bird Records	CD	WOU 4026

^aThis release includes extensive liner notes, including interviews and photographs
