= Alleged in Their Own Time =

Studio album by the Holy Modal Rounders
- Released: 1975
- Studio: Aengus, Fayville, Massachusetts
- Genre: Freak folk
- Length: 50:11
- Label: Rounder

The Holy Modal Rounders chronology
| Good Taste Is Timeless (1971) | Alleged in Their Own Time (1975) | Have Moicy! (1976) |

Professional ratings
Review scores
| Source | Rating |
|---|---|
| AllMusic | 2/5 stars |
| Christgau's Record Guide | B |

Alleged in Their Own Time is the sixth studio album by the psychedelic folk band the Holy Modal Rounders, released in 1975 through Rounder Records.

== Track listing ==
Side one
| No. | Title | Length |
|---|---|---|
| 1. | "Low Down Dog" | 3:41 |
| 2. | "Don't Seem Right" | 4:58 |
| 3. | "New Reuben's Train" | 3:04 |
| 4. | "Voodoo Queen Marie" | 3:29 |
| 5. | "Chittlin' Cookin' Time in Cheatham County" | 2:18 |
| 6. | "Nova" | 3:33 |
| 7. | "Sally in the Alley" | 3:19 |
| 8. | "She's More to Be Pitied" | 3:30 |

Side two
| No. | Title | Length |
|---|---|---|
| 1. | "Rocky Road" | 2:24 |
| 2. | "Across the Alley from the Alamo" | 4:03 |
| 3. | "Synergy" | 3:43 |
| 4. | "Red Rocking Chair" | 3:30 |
| 5. | "Random Canyon" | 4:04 |
| 6. | "Monday Morning" | 2:17 |
| 7. | "Shoot That Turkey Buzzard" | 2:09 |

== Personnel ==
The Holy Modal Rounders

- Luke Faust
- Robin Remaily
- Peter Stampfel
- Steve Weber
- Guest vocals by Antonia Stampfel and Karen Dalton

Production and design

- Linda Mancini – illustration
- Bill Barth – mixing
