= The Holy Modal Rounders (album) =

Studio album by the Holy Modal Rounders
- Released: 1964
- Genre: Old-time; folk; bluegrass
- Length: 33:34
- Label: Prestige
- Producer: Samuel Charters

The Holy Modal Rounders chronology
The Holy Modal Rounders (1964)	The Holy Modal Rounders 2 (1965)

Professional ratings
Review scores
Source	Rating
AllMusic	4.5/5 stars

The Holy Modal Rounders is the debut album of the folk duo the Holy Modal Rounders, released in 1964 through Prestige Records, and produced by Sam Charters.

They completed this album as an acoustic duo. The two aimed at revising traditional folk standards into a contemporary style. It is an old-time album.

== Track listing ==
Side one
No.	Title	Writer(s)	Length
1.	"Blues in the Bottle"	Traditional; arranged by Stampfel, Weber	3:23
2.	"Give the Fiddler a Dram"	Traditional arr.	2:32
3.	"The Cuckoo"	Clarence Ashley	3:06
4.	"Euphoria"	Robin Remaily	1:30
5.	"Long John"	Traditional arr.	2:20
6.	"Hesitation Blues"	Traditional arr.	2:18
7.	"Hey, Hey Baby"	Weber	1:19

Side two
No.	Title	Writer(s)	Length
1.	"Reuben's Train"	Traditional arr.	2:28
2.	"Mr. Bass Man (Mister Spaceman)"	Johnny Cymbal	1:52
3.	"Moving Day"	Charlie Poole	2:30
4.	"Better Things for You"	Traditional arr.	3:10
5.	"Same Old Man"	Traditional arr.	1:41
6.	"Hop High Ladies"	Traditional arr.	1:59
7.	"Bound to Lose"	Stampfel	4:16

== Personnel ==
The Holy Modal Rounders

- Peter Stampfel – fiddle, banjo, vocals
- Steve Weber – guitar, vocals

Additional musicians and production

- Don Schlitten – photography, illustration
