= Watertower (album) =

Studio album by Michael Hurley
- Released: 1988
- Genre: Folk
- Label: Fundamental
- Producer: Dan Archer, Michael Hurley

Michael Hurley chronology
Blue Navigator (1984)	Watertower (1988)	Land of Lofi and Redbirds (1988)

Watertower is an album by the American musician Michael Hurley, released in 1988. Hurley would rerecord four of its songs for 1995's Wolfways. For many years the only way to purchase the album was as a vinyl release at Hurley's concerts; Hurley would also dub copies onto cassette for a fee.

== Production ==
Eugene Chadbourne encouraged Hurley to record for the Fundamental record label. "I Paint a Design" is about Hurley's visual art endeavors. The album's songs eschewed both the polish of Nashville country music and the finesse of bluegrass music.

== Critical reception ==
Professional ratings
Review scores
Source	Rating
AllMusic	3/5 stars
Robert Christgau	B+
Daily Press	3.5/5 stars
The Encyclopedia of Popular Music	3/5 stars
The Rolling Stone Album Guide	3/5 stars
Spin Alternative Record Guide	7/10

Robert Christgau noted that Hurley "still writes more calmly and curiously about the great beyond than anyone."

Spin included the album on its list of 80 excellent "underground" albums of the 1980s, deeming it "funny, oddball folk music." The Daily Press called it "atypically robust and awake." In a 1996 review of Wolfways, Miami New Times opined that Watertower was where Hurley's "laid-back expoundings started sounding lazy." In 2000, USA Today wrote: "No one plays folk blues like this anymore, and Hurley's lyrics waste no time with concepts that fall short of the eternal. His playful, earnest songs deal with the mythological importance of the moon, dreams, dead blues masters and the creative urge."

== Track listing ==
No.	Title	Length
1.	"The Revenant"
2.	"I Paint a Design"
3.	"Lush Green Trees"
4.	"Keep Rockin'"
5.	"You'll Never Go to Heaven"
6.	"Ma's Dream Blues"
7.	"I Still Could Not Forget You Then"
8.	"Indian Chiefs & Hula Girls"
9.	"Broadcasting the Blues"
10.	"Uncle Bob's Corner"
11.	"Moon Song"
