= Luke Faust =

American musician

Luke Faust (born 1936) is an American folk musician, best known as a member of the Insect Trust.

== Career ==
In the early 1960s, Faust often played at The Gaslight Cafe in Greenwich Village, New York City, performing with a wide array of instruments including banjo, fiddle, harmonica, and jug. There, he became acquainted with fellow folk revival musicians Dave Van Ronk, Jerry Rasmussen, and Bob Dylan. During this time, Faust briefly joined Peter Stampfel and Steve Weber of the Holy Modal Rounders on the jug.

Faust moved to Hoboken, New Jersey in 1963. There, he became a founding member of the Hoboken-based band The Insect Trust circa 1966. He was the band's banjo, fiddle, and harmonica player. Later in the 1990s, he went on to form The Jug Jam, an improvisational jug band with Perry Robinson, Lou Grassi, and Wayne Lopes. Faust also played with 90 proof – a band with Steve James.

Faust is currently performing with The Carolina Jug Stompers playing rags, blues and breakdowns in the old-time jug – stringband style. Faust's contributions to music has been described in Bob Dylan's book, Chronicles: Volume One, where Dylan recalled Faust as "someone closer in temperament to me," and Dave Van Ronk's compilation album, The Mayor of MacDougal Street.

== Discography ==
With The Insect Trust

- 1969 The Insect Trust
- 1970 Hoboken Saturday Night

With Dave Van Ronk

- 2000 Dealin' With The Devil

With The Carolina Jug Stompers

- 2005 Rooster on a Limb
1. . "Money Never Runs Out"
2. . "Maybelle Rag"
3. . "Going to Germany"
4. . "Bum Bum Blues"
5. . "New Orleans Wiggle"/"Somebody Stole My Gal"
6. . "Gin Done Done It"
7. . "Under the Chicken Tree"
8. . "Lonely One in This Town"
9. . "Cotton Picker’s Rag"
10. . "Central Georgia Blues"
11. . "Rooster on a Limb"
12. . "Please Baby"
13. . "Podunk Toddle"
14. . "K.C. Moan"
15. . "Georgia Pines"
16. . "Busted"
17. . "Carolina Shout"/"House Rent Rag"

== Bibliography ==
- La Gorce, Tammy.: "Throwing Rock Snobs a Bone", The New York Times, December 18, 2005. Section 14NJ; Column 4; New Jersey Weekly Desk; Music; p. 14.
- "POP/JAZZ; STAMPFEL'S BOTTLE CAPS: A MERRY MIX OF MUSIC" by Robert Palmer. The New York Times, May 16, 1986, Late City Final Edition.
