= Brownsmead, Oregon =

Unincorporated community in the state of Oregon, United States

- Unincorporated community
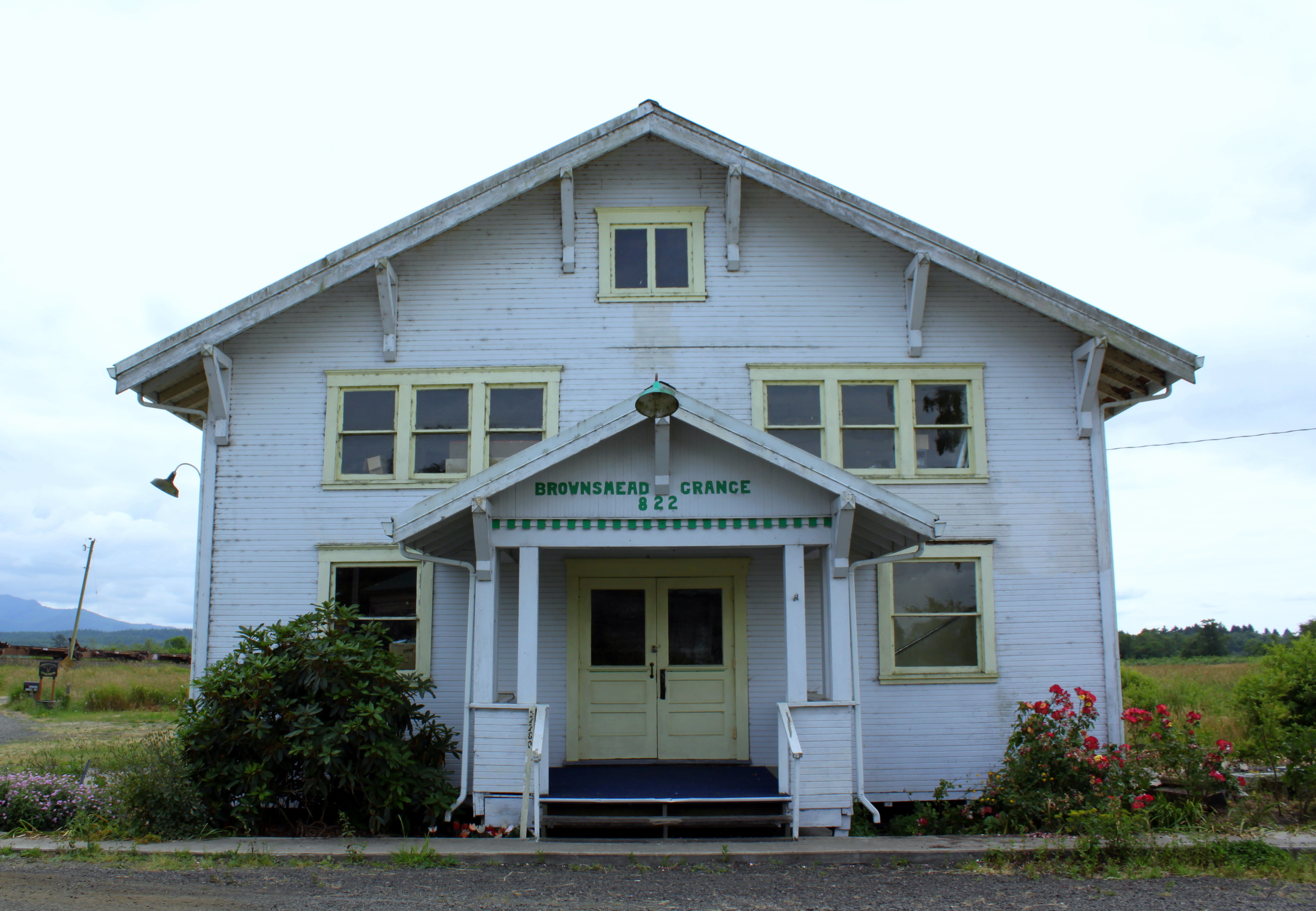
- Grange hall

- Location within the state of Oregon Brownsmead (the United States)
- Coordinates: 46°13′03″N 123°32′26″W
- Country: United States
- State: Oregon
- County: Clatsop
- Elevation: 10 ft (3.0 m)
- Time zone: UTC-8 (Pacific (PST))
  - Summer (DST): UTC-7 (PDT)
- ZIP code: 97103
- Area codes: 503 and 971
- GNIS feature ID: 1637833

Brownsmead is an unincorporated community, on a distributary of the Columbia River called Saspal Slough, in Clatsop County, Oregon, United States. Previously known as Brody, it was named after W.G. Brown, a Portland engineer involved in land reclamation in the area. There was a post office in Brownsmead from 1919 to 1975, located in the Brownsmead General Store.

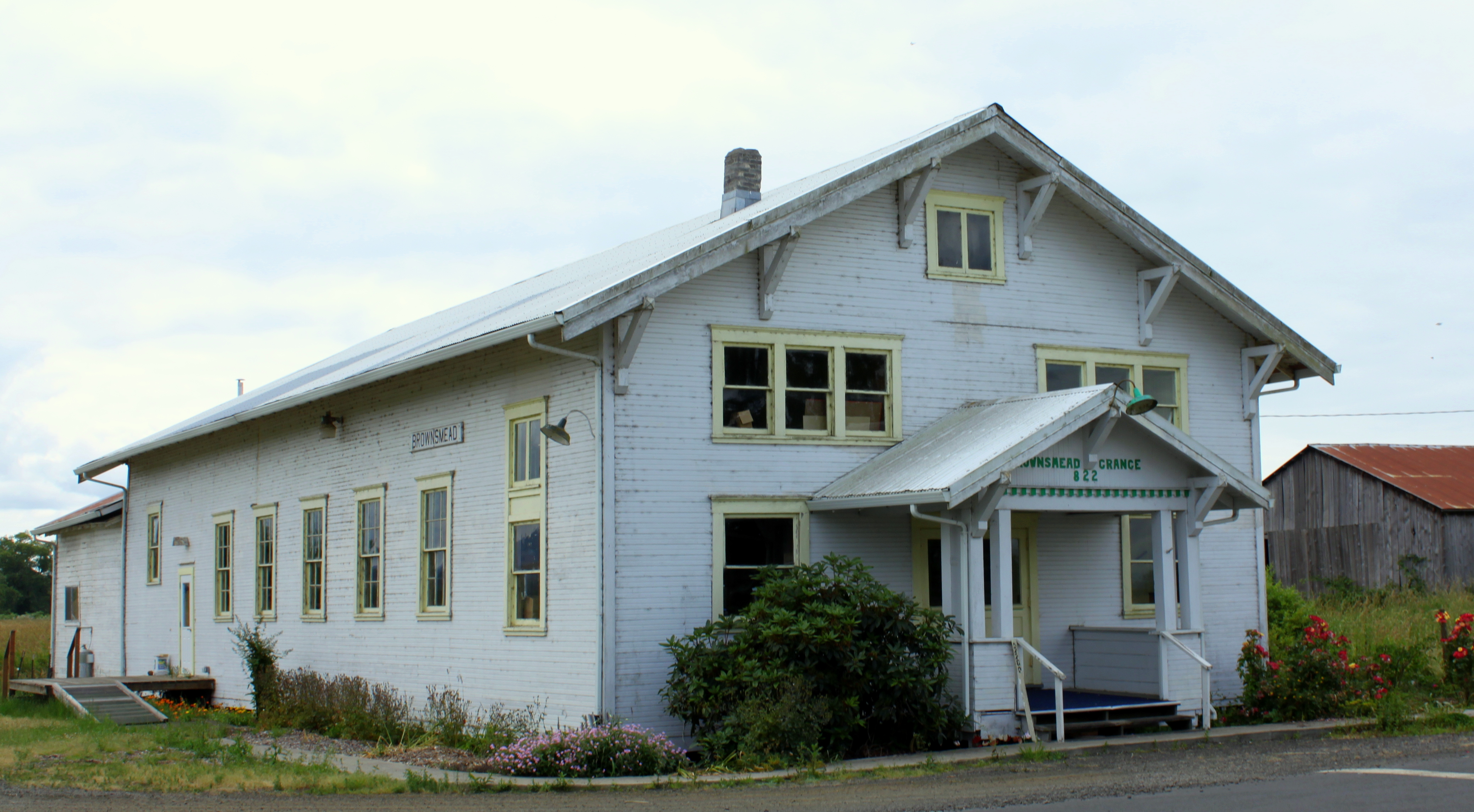
Grange hall

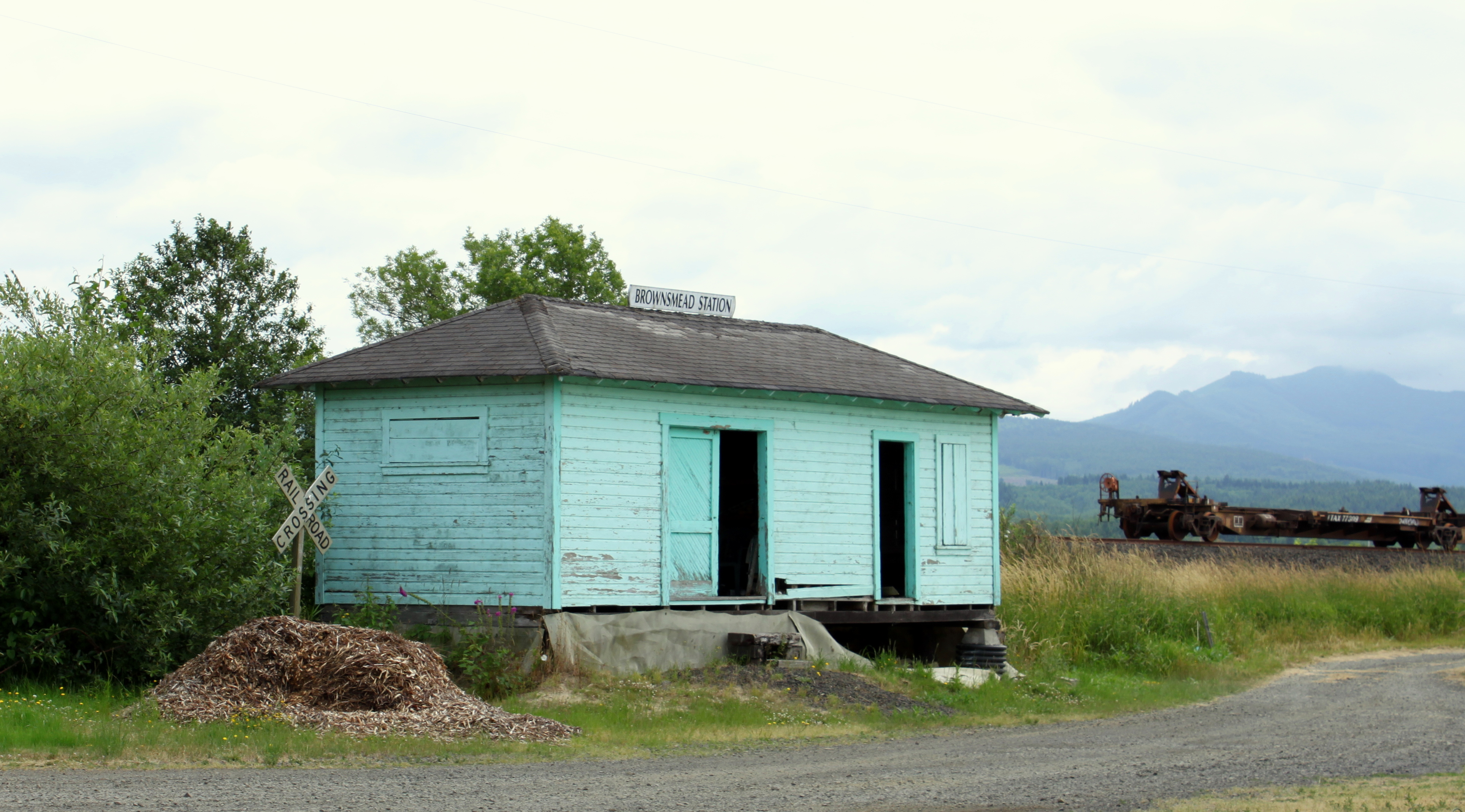
Rail station

Historic photos of the Brownsmead fish station, located where Davis Creek feeds into Blind Slough, reveal docked gillnetting boats. One such boat is shown in the boat hoist, resting above the water by several feet on the dock.

The folksinger Michael Hurley resided in Brownsville until his death in 2025. Brownsmead is the northernmost settlement in the state of Oregon.
