= Snockgrass =

Studio album by Michael Hurley
- Released: 1980
- Recorded: 1979
- Genre: Folk
- Length: 50:59
- Label: Rounder

Michael Hurley chronology
| Long Journey (1976) | Snockgrass (1980) | Blue Navigator (1984) |

Snockgrass is a 1980 folk album by Michael Hurley. The album was released by Rounder Records, with a reissue in 1997.

The album places emphasis on Hurley's vocals. There is traditional folk influenced by freakbeat, blues and jazz. Lyrics on the tracks tend to be serious, satirical, and humorous. Hurley sometimes shift tones in the middle of a song, creating humor out of a serious situation or vice versa.

Hurley was backed by a band that he dubbed the Sensitivos. He played mandolin on "Goin' to Florida".

== Critical reception ==
Professional ratings
Review scores
| Source | Rating |
|---|---|
| AllMusic | 4.5/5 stars |
| The Buffalo News | 4/5 stars |
| Robert Christgau | A− |
| Daily Press | 4.5/5 stars |
| MusicHound Folk: The Essential Album Guide | 3.5/5 stars |
| The Rolling Stone Album Guide | 3/5 stars |
| Spin Alternative Record Guide | 9/10 |

The Buffalo News called Snockgrass Hurley's "brightest and most accessible record."

In 1993, the Daily Press wrote that "thoughtful love songs [balance] some of Hurley's funniest deprave-ups." Reviewing the 1997 reissue, The Star-Ledger determined that "Hurley's deadpan delivery, his chunky rhythm guitar, the occasional loopy background vocals, off-center drums and groaning fiddles conjure up a vanished era of American hippiedom." City Pages stated that Hurley "found mercy in weaving simple, languid, folk tunes, rooted in detailed accounts of quotidian delights—watching sunsets, drinking porter, eating pork chops, going down."

== Track listing ==
Side one

1. "Midnite Rounder" – 3:09
2. "O My Stars" – 3:29
3. "Tia Marie" – 4:01
4. "I'm Gettin' Ready to Go" - 3:52
5. "Watchin' the Show" – 3:34
6. "Automatic Slim & the Fat Boys" – 4:05

Side two

1. "Don't Treat Me Bad" – 2:32
2. "I Heard the Voice of a Porkchop" (Jim Jackson) – 2:46
3. "No Home" – 2:02
4. "Jolé Blon" – 2:34
5. "I Think I'll Move" – 3:23
6. "Goin' to Florida" – 3:42
7. "You Gonna Look Like a Monkey" (Williams, Hall) - 3:57

1997 CD release bonus tracks

1. "Sweet Lucy" (alternative take) - 4:02
2. "Grapefruit Juice Blues" - 4:24
