= Going Nowhere Fast =

Studio album by Stampfel & Weber
- Released: 1981
- Genre: Folk
- Label: Rounder

The Holy Modal Rounders chronology
Last Round (1978)	Going Nowhere Fast (1981)	Too Much Fun! (1999)

Going Nowhere Fast is a studio album by the American band the Holy Modal Rounders, released in 1981 through Rounder Records. It was recorded as a duo and credited as Stampfel & Weber.

== Critical reception ==
Professional ratings
Review scores
Source	Rating
AllMusic	4.5/5 stars
The Encyclopedia of Popular Music	4/5 stars
Spin Alternative Record Guide	6/10
The Village Voice	A−

The Boston Globe wrote: "By bringing a free wheeling approach to each song, the two establish a balance between authenticity and strangeness that is usually just right. They are not to everyone's taste but there's always a place for an irreverent, lopsided approach to traditional American music—and besides, they're fun." The New York Times noted that "it's also nice to hear Mr. Stampfel snarl so musically and so vociferously near the beginning of 'Goin' to Memphis', and his wavering but unfailingly enthusiastic lead and harmony vocals are a delight throughout."

== Track listing ==
Side one
No.	Title	Length
1.	"You’ve Got the Right String Baby, But the Wrong Yo-Yo"
2.	"My Name Is Morgan But It Ain’t J. P."
3.	"Goin’ to Memphis"
4.	"Goin’ to Memphis (Reprise)"
5.	"Jeanine’s Dream"
6.	"When the Iceworms Nest Again"
7.	"If You’ll Be My Girl"
8.	"Aeko"
9.	"Lovin’ Mad Tom"

Side two
No.	Title	Length
1.	"Sea of Love"
2.	"Come to the Mardi Gras"
3.	"Philadelphia Lawyer"
4.	"Are You from Dixie?"
5.	"Smokey Joe’s Café"
6.	"Goodbye to Booze"
7.	"Junker’s Blues"
8.	"Red Rooster"
9.	"Coldest Woman"
10.	"Dance in Slow Motion"
11.	"Unnamed Rag"

== Personnel ==
- Peter Stampfel
- Steve Weber
