= Have Moicy! =

1976 collaborative album by multiple musicians

Studio album by Michael Hurley, the Unholy Modal Rounders and Jeffrey Frederick & the Clamtones
- Released: January 1, 1976
- Recorded: July 14–July 15, 1975
- Genre: Folk
- Length: 40:40
- Label: Rounder
- Producer: John Nagy

The Holy Modal Rounders chronology
Alleged in Their Own Time (1975)	Have Moicy! (1976)	Last Round (1978)

Have Moicy! is a collaborative studio album by Michael Hurley, the Unholy Modal Rounders and Jeffrey Frederick & the Clamtones. It was released on January 1, 1976, by Rounder Records. In 2011, Light in the Attic Records reissued Have Moicy! on vinyl. Although credited to three different groups, the music is performed by an overlapping cast of musicians, with Hurley, Frederick, and Peter Stampfel alternating lead vocals with one track sung by Paul Presti.

== Reception ==
Professional ratings
Review scores
Source	Rating
AllMusic	4.5/5 stars
Christgau's Record Guide	A+
Rolling Stone	link

Robert Christgau of The Village Voice ranked it as his favorite album of 1976 in his ballot for Pazz & Jop, and as his tenth favorite album of the 70s. Later, he included it in his ballot for the 2020 edition of Rolling Stone's list of "The 500 Greatest Albums of All Time", and noted it as his household's most played album.

Mark Deming of AllMusic also reviewed the album positively, writing, "Have Moicy! is as close to a masterpiece as a group of people this genially laid-back would ever be capable of creating."

== Track listing ==
1. "Midnight in Paris" (Con Conrad, Herb Magidson; additional lyrics by Antonia, Peter Stampfel, Paul Presti) – 3:17
2. "Robbin' Banks" (Jeffrey Frederick) – 4:00
3. "Slurf Song" (Michael Hurley) – 3:18
4. "Jackknife/The Red Newt" (Frederick) – 3:29
5. "Griselda" (Antonia [Duren]) – 2:22
6. "What Made My Hamburger Disappear" (Frederick) – 3:05
7. "Sweet Lucy" (Hurley) – 4:05
8. "Country Bump" (Stampfel) – 2:38
9. "Fooey Fooey" – (Hurley) 2:55
10. "Jealous Daddy's Death Song" (Antonia [Duren], Presti) – 2:04
11. "Driving Wheel" (Hurley) – 3:45
12. "Weep Weep Weep" (Frederick) – 2:13
13. "Hoodoo Bash" (Antonia [Duren]) – 3:32

== Personnel ==
- Jeffrey Frederick – guitar (2, 4, 6, 9, 12), lead vocal (2, 4, 6, 12), washboard (1, 5, 8, 13), backing vocal (3, 7, 9)
- Jill Gross – backing vocal (1, 2, 4, 5, 6, 7, 9, 12, 13)
- Michael Hurley – lead vocal (3, 7, 9, 11), fiddle (3), guitar (7, 9, 11)
- Wax Iwaskiewicz – guitar and backing vocal (7, 11)
- John Nagy – mandola (7)
- Robert Nickson ("Froggy") – drums (all except 3, 8, 12)
- Paul Presti – guitar (1, 4, 5, 8, 10, 13), backing vocal (1, 5, 13), slide guitar (2, 6, 7, 13), lead vocal (10), clapping (8)
- Dave Reisch – bass (all tracks), backing vocal (3, 4)
- Robin Remailly – mandolin (1, 4, 6, 9, 13), fiddle (2, 3, 8, 10), backing vocal (4)
- Peter Stampfel – fiddle (3, 5, 7, 8, 10, 13), lead vocal (1, 5, 8, 13), banjo (1), backing vocal (10), drum (8)

== Covers ==
"Griselda" was covered by indie rock band Yo La Tengo in their 1990 album Fakebook.

"Sweet Lucy" was covered by indie folk musician Cass McCombs on a 2020 split release with Steve Gunn. Ekoostik Hookah covered "Sweet Lucy" on their 2002 release, Ohio Grown.

== Sequel ==
A sequel album, Have Moicy 2: The Hoodoo Bash, featuring Peter Stampfel and Jeffrey Lewis, was released in 2015.
