= The Holy Modal Rounders =

American folk music duo

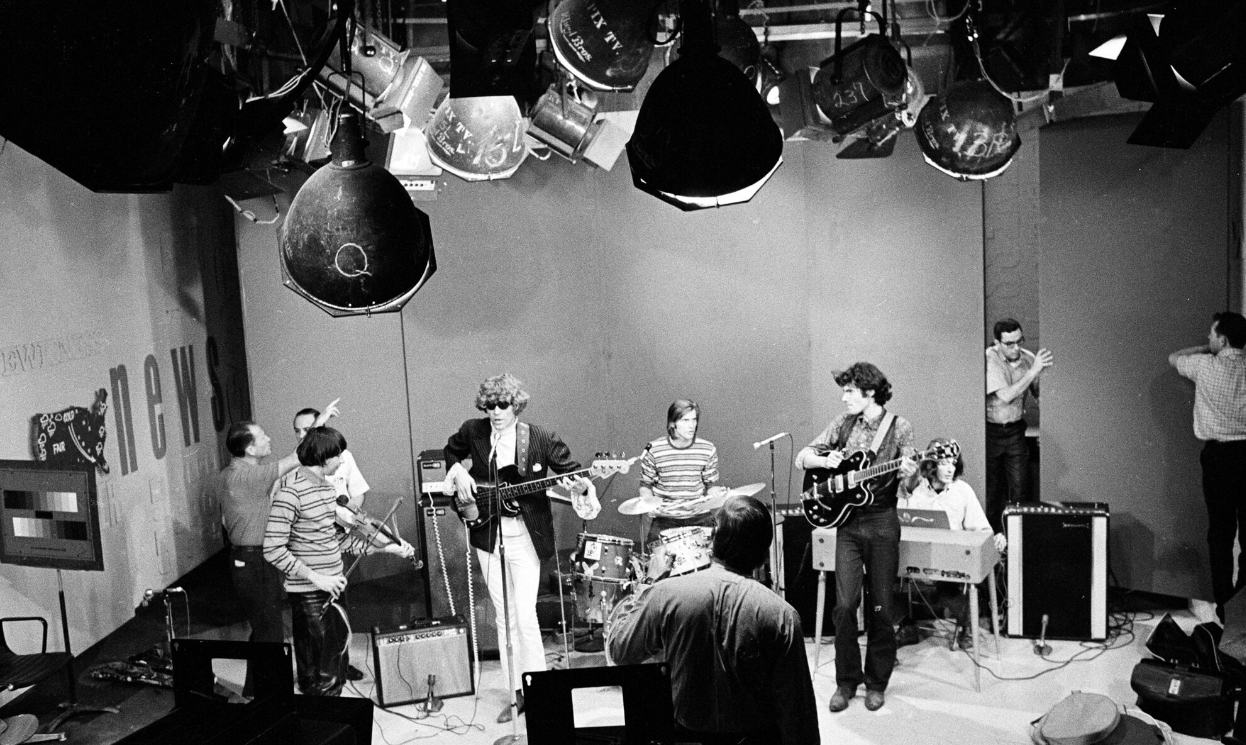
- Holy Modal Rounders rehearsal in 1968; Left to right: Peter Stampfel, John Annis, Sam Shepard, Steve Weber and Richard Tyler

Background information
- Origin: Lower East Side, New York City, U.S.
- Genres: Old-time; psychedelic folk; freak folk; acid folk; folk rock
- Years active: 1963–2003
- Labels: Prestige, ESP-Disk, Elektra, Metromedia, Rounder, Adelphi, Don Giovanni
- Spinoffs: The Moray Eels; The Unholy Modal Rounders; Clamtones
- Past members: Peter Stampfel; Steve Weber; Sam Shepard; Antonia; John Annis; Richard Tyler; Michael McCarty; Robin Remaily; Dave Reisch; Ted Deane; Roger North; Luke Faust

The Holy Modal Rounders was an American folk music group, originally a duo (members Peter Stampfel and Steve Weber) who formed in 1963 on the Lower East Side of Manhattan. Although they achieved only limited commercial and critical success in the 1960s and 1970s, they earned a dedicated cult following and have been retrospectively praised for their reworking of early 20th century folk music as well as their innovation in several genres, including freak folk and psychedelic folk. With a career spanning 40 years, the Holy Modal Rounders were influential both in the New York scene where they began and to subsequent generations of underground musicians.

As the Holy Modal Rounders, Stampfel and Weber began playing in and around the Greenwich Village scene, at the heart of the ongoing American folk music revival. Their sense of humor, irreverent attitude, and novel update of old-time music brought support from fellow musicians but was controversial amongst some folk traditionalists. In 1964, the Rounders released their self-titled debut, which included the first use of the word "psychedelic" in popular music. After their first two studio albums, the duo briefly joined the newly formed underground rock band the Fugs in 1965 and helped record the band's influential debut album.

Following their exit from the Fugs, the duo released two albums that experimented with psychedelic folk before they expanded their lineup to a full rock band by the end of 1968. The Holy Modal Rounders' expanded lineup included playwright Sam Shepard as a drummer and many short-lived members before it stabilized in 1971 with keyboardist Richard Tyler, multi-instrumentalist Robin Remaily, bassist Dave Reisch, drummer Roger North, and saxophonist Ted Deane. Beginning in 1975, this backing group would also play with Jeffrey Frederick as the Clamtones. In 1972, Weber and the band relocated to Portland, Oregon, while Stampfel stayed behind in New York. Although Stampfel would describe Weber as his "long lost brother", they often had a hostile relationship and the two would only reunite sporadically during the next twenty years. After Weber returned to the East Coast in the mid-1990s, the duo began a series of concert reunions starting in 1996 before breaking up for the last time in 2003.

== Origin of the name ==
Stampfel explained the origin of the name in the webzine Perfect Sound Forever:

[Weber and I] kept changing the name. First it was the Total Quintessence Stomach Pumpers. Then the Temporal Worth High Steppers. Then The Motherfucker Creek Babyrapers. That was just a joke name. He was Rinky-Dink Steve the Tin Horn and I was Fast Lightning Cumquat. He was Teddy Boy Forever and I was Wild Blue Yonder. It kept changing names. Then it was the Total Modal Rounders. Then when we were stoned on pot and someone else, Steve Close maybe, said Holy Modal Rounders by mistake. We kept putting out different names and wait until someone starts calling us that then. When we got to Holy Modal Rounders, everyone decided by accumulation [sic] that we were the Holy Modal Rounders. That's the practical way to get named.

== History ==
=== 1963–1965: As a duo ===
==== Formation and initial influences ====
Fiddle and banjo player Peter Stampfel and country-blues guitarist Steve Weber were introduced to each other in May 1963 by Stampfel's girlfriend Antonia Duren (or Antonia Stampfel), who was mononymously known as Antonia. Stampfel grew up in Wisconsin and moved to New York City in 1959, where he soon became heavily influenced by Harry Smith's Anthology of American Folk Music. Weber grew up in Bucks County, Pennsylvania, where he met musicians Michael Hurley and Robin Remaily, both of whom would later collaborate with the Rounders. According to Stampfel, he and Weber began performing together in New York City not long after being introduced, eventually settling on the name the Holy Modal Rounders.

Everywhere we go people ask us what kind of music we play. Most people have not understood when we explained that no one has ever played music like us before, so of course no one ever bothered naming it. Steve calls it rockabilly and I call it progressive old-timey but I doubt if that helps much.

— Peter Stampfel in the original liner notes for The Holy Modal Rounders (1964)

Although taking much inspiration from traditional folk music, in particular Anthology of American Folk Music, the duo quickly showed an inclination to "update old-time folk music with a contemporary spirit", per critic Richie Unterberger. According to Stampfel, "the purist attitude at the time was that this golden age [of folk music] was gone, and the right way to do [folk music] was to try to recreate it down to the pop and scratch on the old 78 RPM record. I mean, that's certainly a valid viewpoint, but it wasn't mine." Unterberger wrote that they "twisted weathered folk standards with wobbly vocals, exuberantly strange arrangements, and interpretations that were liberal, to say the least."

Stampfel himself described the genesis of his approach to music at the time: "I got the idea in 1963: What if Charlie Poole, and Charley Patton, and Uncle Dave Macon and all those guys were magically transported from the late 1920s to 1963? And then they were exposed to contemporary rock 'n' roll. What [would] they do?" This realization was partially inspired by Stampfel seeing an early Bob Dylan perform folk music with a rock and roll phrasing: "from that, I realized that folk music and early rock-and-roll, which I'd thought were some kind of enemies, and certainly two disparate things, were totally capable of being reconciled and blended." Dylan himself was a fan of Stampfel, who had been a part of the New York folk scene since Dylan's arrival, and listed Stampfel as one of his favorite singers during a 1961 interview before the Rounders were created.

With these intentions to update traditional music in mind, Stampfel began to change the words and add new verses to the traditional songs they played, later reflecting: "when I started writing songs... I mostly did it the way Bob Dylan started writing songs in 1961, which is putting new words to old songs". The duo's lyrical changes often featured references to their frequent and open drug use. Fellow folk singer Dave Van Ronk recalled that "they were stoned out of their birds all the time. Everybody knew it, they made no bones about it, and they were having fun." Author Jesse Jarnow also recognized this influence, commenting the Holy Modal Rounders were "overtly inspired by both Harry Smith's Anthology of American Folk Music and drugs."

From the beginning, the duo's unorthodox approach to covering old-time music was negatively received by some folk purists. A review of the duo's debut album in the famed folk music magazine Sing Out! dismissed their music as "parody of folk song and folk content... with a sort of fear written into it—fear of coming out into the open as serious performers." Ariel Swartley of The New York Times retrospectively remarked that they stood out in the New York folk scene, in which performers were usually reverential to the material they covered, for "shoe-horning one old-time melody into the middle of another, slipping updated references into archaic laments, making scatological asides or a casual segue to an unrelated fiddle tune and throwing in enough grunts, woofs, whistles and squeals to put both an aging steam engine and a seventh-grade classroom to shame." Despite their seemingly irreverent approach, however, Swartley noted the duo "pursued traditional American music with an archival passion to rival that of the New Lost City Ramblers." NPR echoed this and disagreed with Sing Out!'s analysis, arguing that the band "wasn't doing parodies of old folk songs. Its members knew the music inside and out."

While some in the folk scene disapproved of their approach, Stampfel and Weber attracted a small and devoted following. Terri Thal, Dave Van Ronk's first wife, thought the songs they wrote were "brilliant" and subsequently became the band's manager in late 1964. Peter Tork of the Monkees was an early fan, reminiscing the duo was "absolutely hilarious" and brought "a whole new level of authenticity" to the scene. Sterling Morrison of the Velvet Underground similarly praised the Rounders, saying that "the Fugs, the Holy Modal Rounders, and the Velvet Underground were the only authentic Lower East Side bands. We were real bands playing for real people in a real scene." The duo was also friendly with and occasionally performed with Karen Dalton and Luke Faust, who briefly played the jug with the duo, during this time. Concurrent with the Rounders' original incarnation, Stampfel wrote a regular column for the folk music magazine Broadside called "Holy Modal Blither".

==== Debut and sophomore albums ====
Got my psychedelic feet in my psychedelic shoes/I believe, Lordy mama, got the psychedelic blues

— "Hesitation Blues" by the Holy Modal Rounders

In 1963, the duo was signed to Prestige Records by Paul A. Rothchild for two albums. Recorded the day before John F. Kennedy's assassination, their first album The Holy Modal Rounders was released in 1964 and produced by Sam Charters. The album mainly featured covers of traditional songs with rewritten lyrics. Most notably, the album contained a rewriting of the lyrics of "Hesitation Blues", during which Stampfel sings the first recorded use of the term "psychedelic" in popular music. The duo's arrangement of the traditional song "Blues in the Bottle" opens the album and went on to be covered by Jim Kweskin & the Jug Band and the Lovin' Spoonful. "Euphoria", written by Robin Remaily, was also featured on their debut and was soon covered by the Youngbloods. Ariel Swartley later observed that the song "did for marijuana what Grace Slick's 'White Rabbit' did for LSD three years later."

Their second album, The Holy Modal Rounders 2, followed in 1965 and was also produced by Charters. Although neither of their first two albums received much attention upon release, the albums have garnered increased coverage retrospectively, with Michael Simmons of LA Weekly describing the debut as a "classic of demented archaic country with rhythmic hints of rock, Stampfel's helium vocals, and his skewed lyrics." In 1972, the two albums were combined by Fantasy Records on the double-LP Stampfel & Weber. In 1999, Fantasy reissued it as 1 & 2, with the addition of two unreleased songs, to positive reviews. Tom Hull, writing in 2004 for the fourth edition of The Rolling Stone Album Guide, gave the reissue a four and half star rating, saying "it may have sounded weird way back when, but it sounds fresher than ever today."

=== 1965: The Fugs ===
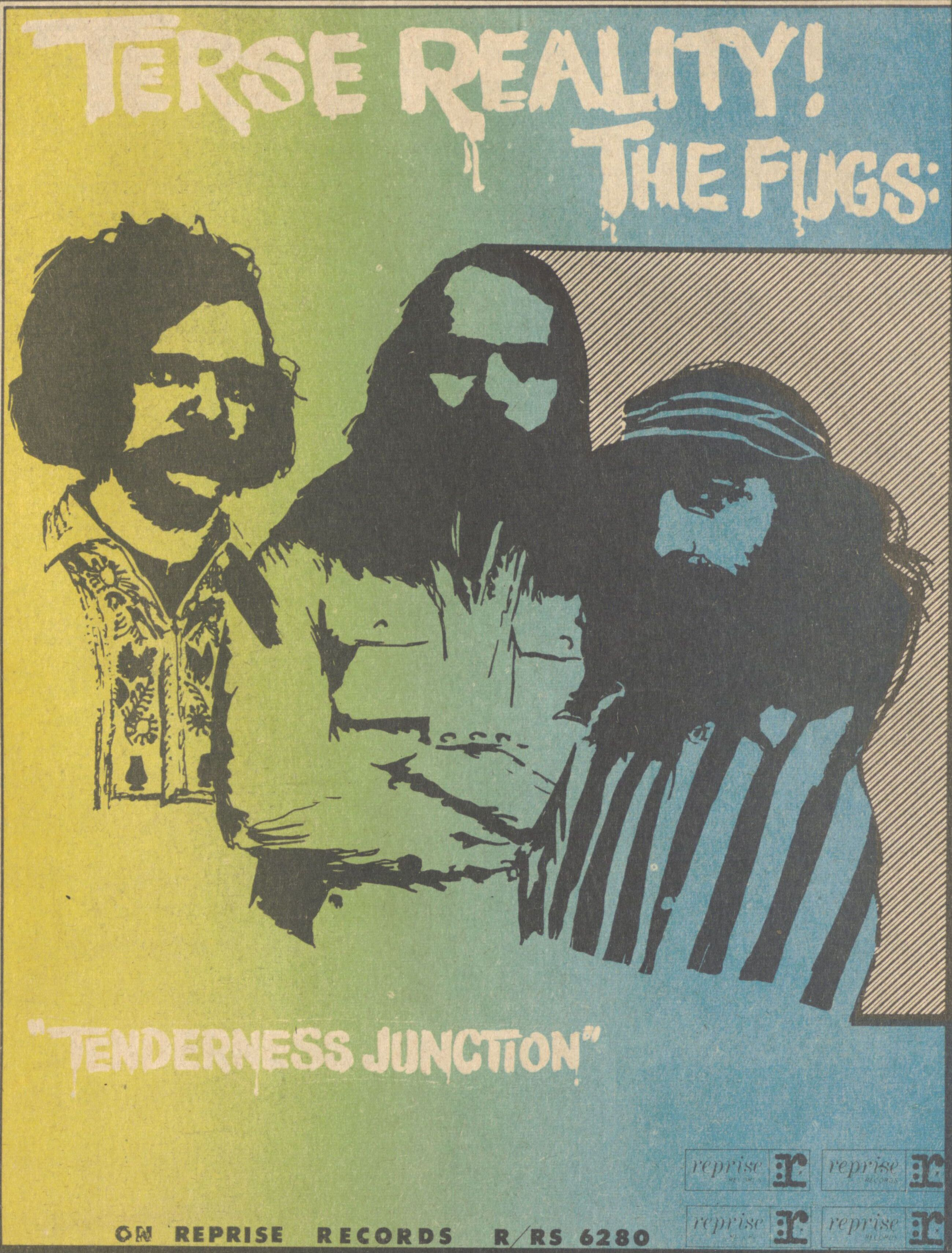
The three original members of the Fugs, left to right: Ed Sanders, Ken Weaver, Tuli Kupferberg

In late 1964, Weber and Stampfel attended a practice performance of the newly formed band the Fugs, created by Beat poets Ed Sanders and Tuli Kupferberg and drummer Ken Weaver. Inspired by their political views, humorous and explicit songwriting, and do-it-yourself attitude to music, Stampfel and Weber offered to join the Fugs, with Stampfel noting that band previously had only Weaver's hand drum to back up Kupferberg's and Sanders's lyrics. Richie Unterberger later reflected that the Rounders joining the Fugs "instantly multipl[ied] the group's instrumental skills many times over... A real, albeit ragged, band was beginning to take shape."

On February 24, 1965, at Sanders's bookstore Peace Eye, the Fugs performed their first gig, which was attended by Andy Warhol, George Plimpton, William Burroughs, and James Michener. Stampfel and Weber joined the Fugs in their performance. Continuing to play with the group for several months, Stampfel and Weber both participated in an April studio session, but only Weber participated in a subsequent September session. These two sessions resulted in the material featured on the Fugs' debut studio album The Village Fugs Sing Ballads of Contemporary Protest, Point of Views, and General Dissatisfaction. Produced by Harry Smith, the album was originally released on Folkways Records' subsidiary label Broadside in 1965 and was re-released soon after on ESP-Disk in 1966 as The Fugs First Album. The album included Weber's songwriting effort "Boobs a Lot". (The Rounders would record their own version of the song on Good Taste Is Timeless.) Outtakes from these sessions were released by ESP-Disk as the Fugs' third studio album Virgin Fugs in 1967. Additional outtakes from the two sessions were released on Fugs 4, Rounders Score in 1975, also on ESP-Disk.

In July 1965, Stampfel left the Fugs and quit the Holy Modal Rounders, later citing his frustration with Weber, who would not work on new songs and whose drug abuse was making him increasingly erratic and unreliable. Soon after, the Fugs were filmed and photographed at Andy Warhol's The Factory. Warhol was a noted fan of the Fugs and frequented their shows. Featuring Weber performing with the Fugs, the reel was listed in Warhol's filmography as The Fugs and the Holy Modal Rounders. Weber continued performing with the group until he was fired by the end of 1965 for being unreliable.

=== 1966–1981: Lineup expansion ===
==== Psychedelic folk era ====
After leaving the Fugs and the Holy Modal Rounders, Stampfel decided to form a rock band with his girlfriend Antonia. Although Antonia did not play any instruments, she and Stampfel began a fruitful songwriting partnership during this time. An early attempt at Stampfel's rock band included Stampfel, Antonia, Sam Shepard, Nancy Jeffries, and Bill Barth. Shepard was already a noted playwright when Stampfel met him in September 1966. Jeffries and Barth stayed with Stampfel and Antonia for a few weeks before they moved into Luke Faust's building. Faust, Barth, and Jeffries went on to form the Insect Trust with Robert Palmer and Trevor Koehler circa 1966. By 1967, Stampfel's rock band, now called the Moray Eels, had a new lineup of Stampfel, Antonia, Shepard on drums, keyboardist Richard Tyler (then on bass), and Dave Levi on guitar.

In June 1967, Stampfel and Weber briefly reunited at the behest of ESP-Disk founder Bernard Stollman to record another Holy Modal Rounders album. Released the same year, Indian War Whoop also included contributions from Shepard and keyboardist (and ex-member of the Fugs) Lee Crabtree. A departure from the old-time music Stampfel and Weber had previously played, Mark Deming of AllMusic retrospectively wrote that "even by the standards of The Holy Modal Rounders' first two albums, 1967's Indian War Whoop is a thoroughly bizarre listening experience" with "neo-psychedelic fiddle-and-guitar freakouts and free-form (and often radically altered) interpretations of traditional folk tunes."

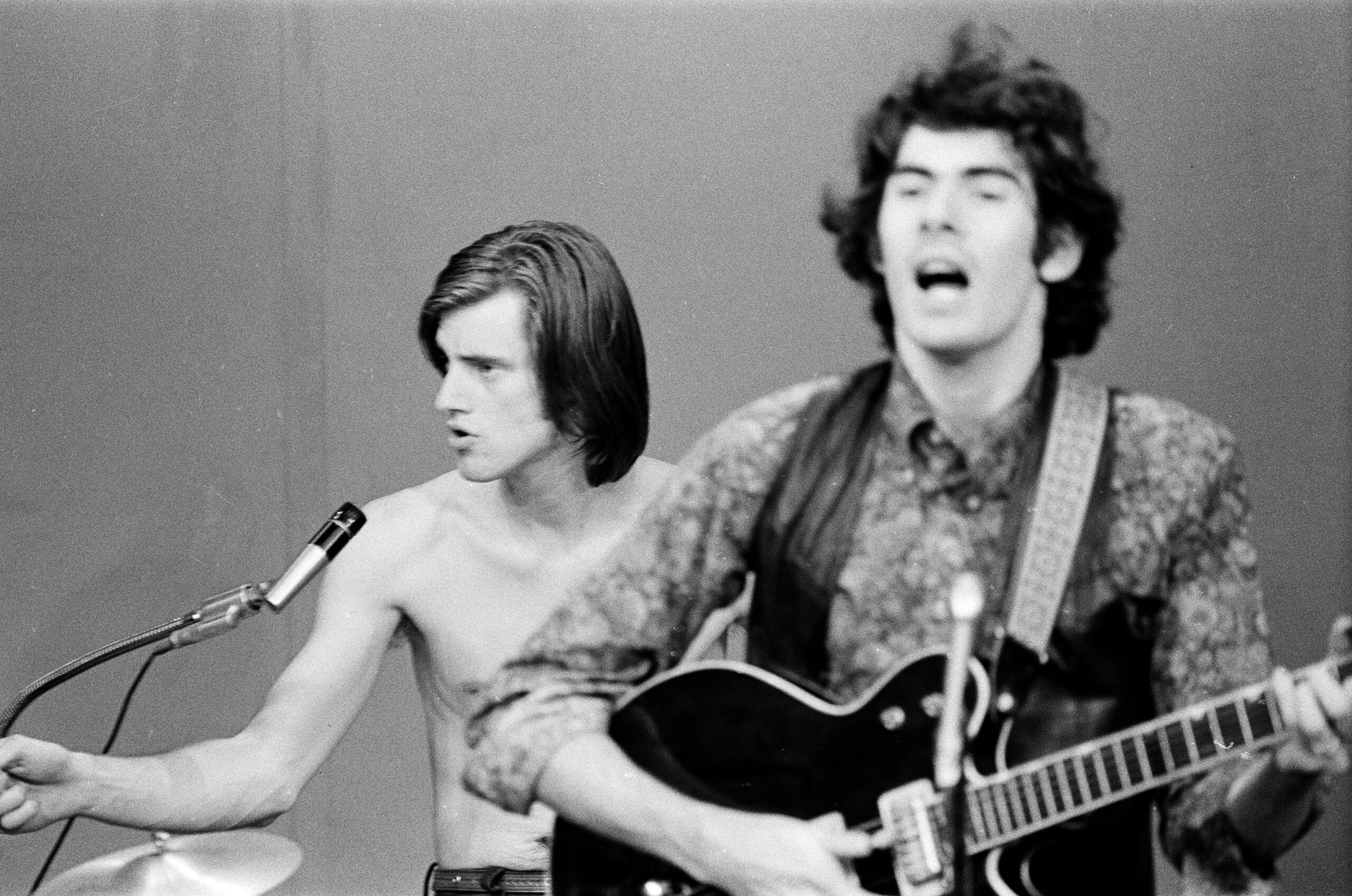
Shepard (left) and Weber playing in 1968

Because Weber had refused to rehearse before recording Indian War Whoop (which led to an uneven and unfocused project in the eyes of Stampfel), Stampfel did not intend to reunite with him again. However, the Moray Eels signed to Elektra Records under the condition that Weber would join the recordings. Thus, Weber came with the Moray Eels as they briefly moved to California in March 1968 to record an album. During the band's time there, Antonia stopped performing with the group and John Annis (sometimes spelled Annas) was hired as a bassist. The Moray Eels Eat The Holy Modal Rounders was released in 1968 as the Rounders' fourth studio album and featured a similar combination of traditional music and psychedelia to Indian War Whoop.

Mike Bourne, in a contemporary review of The Moray Eels in The Spectator (a student newspaper at Indiana University Bloomington), wrote that "the Rounders are ungodly insane in approach, nihilistic even, destroying every convention, every sense, as they constantly laugh at each other and at us for listening to what should be tripe. Yet as honest tripe... the Rounders build a degenerate party we are perhaps all too willing to join." Richie Unterberger retrospectively reflected that "no acid folk album mixed inspiration and lunacy in as downright deranged a fashion as The Moray Eels." Stampfel later expressed dissatisfaction with The Moray Eels citing the fact that he, the rest of the band, and the producer used amphetamines excessively during recording and Weber refused to rehearse any songs before entering the studio. When the album was completed, Weber and the Moray Eels officially combined to reform the Holy Modal Rounders.

While in California, the band played a number of notable shows, opening for Pink Floyd in August in San Francisco, opening for Ike and Tina Turner in Los Angeles, and performing a set on the sketch comedy television show Rowan & Martin's Laugh-In in October. They continued playing shows of high notability after leaving California, opening for the Velvet Underground in Boston in January 1969, playing at Carnegie Hall with the Byrds and the Flying Burrito Brothers in September 1969, and sharing a bill with the Grateful Dead, also in September 1969.

The same year, the Holy Modal Rounders' "Bird Song" (the opening song on The Moray Eels) was included in Dennis Hopper's film Easy Rider and the movie's soundtrack. Hopper had heard the song on the radio and thought it would be perfect for the movie. Easy Riders' soundtrack charted at number 6 on the Billboard Top Ten and went gold.

Not long after the band returned to New York City in early 1969, Shepard left the group to focus on a movie meant to star the Rolling Stones. While Michael McCarty, a friend of Annis, replaced him on drums that year, Shepard remained an occasional associate of the band. In November 1969, Shepard played drums with the Holy Modal Rounders at his wedding. In March 1970, Shepard's play Operation Sidewinder premiered and included music performed onstage by the Holy Modal Rounders. A double bill performance of Shepard's The Unseen Hand and Forensic and the Navigators in April 1970 had the Rounders play a set during the intermission with Shepard on drums. In the same year, Shepard played a gig with them, after which he met soon-to-be lover Patti Smith for the first time. Smith, not yet a musician herself, was there as a journalist to review the Holy Modal Rounders' show.

==== Boston and Portland move ====
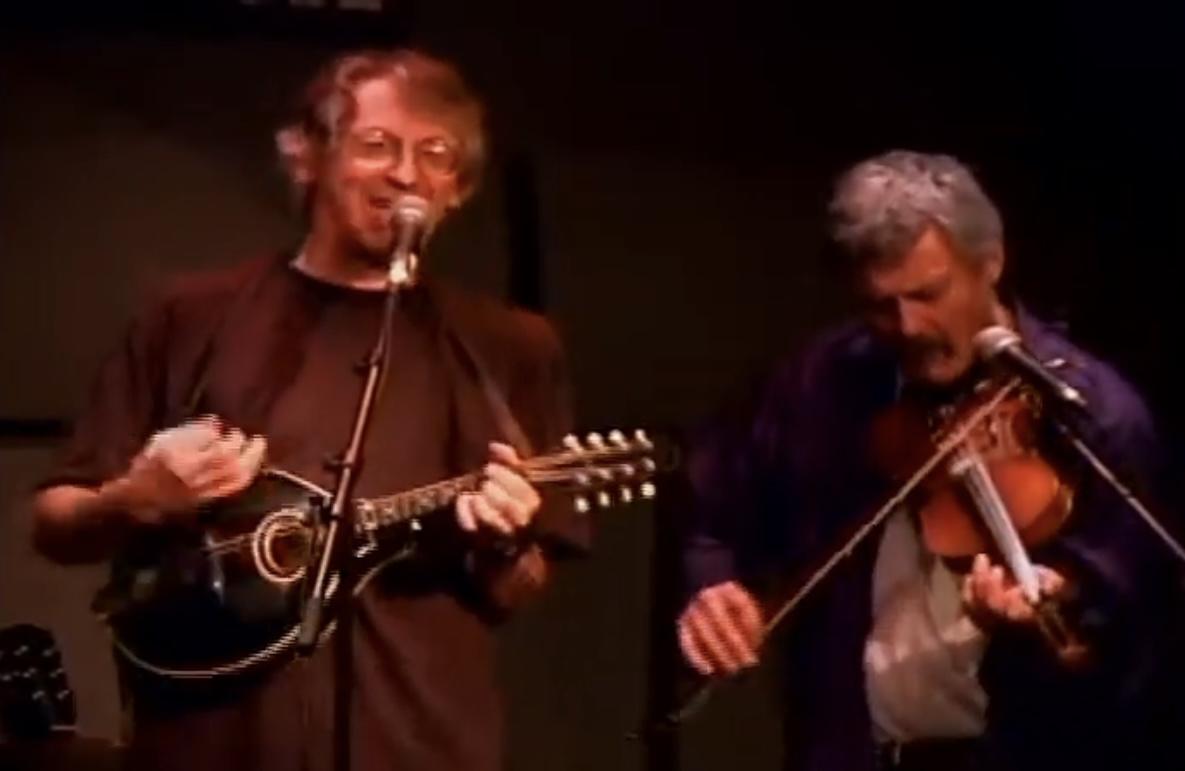
Stampfel (left) and Remaily in early 2000s

In Nashville, the band recorded their 1971 album Good Taste Is Timeless, which saw the band move away from the psychedelia of their past two albums. Not long before the album's recording, Robin Remaily joined the group as a multi-instrumentalist while bassist Dave Reisch replaced Annis in February 1971 after the album's recording. Later in the year, the band relocated to Boston, Massachusetts, where they added saxophonist Ted Deane and replaced McCarty with drummer Roger North (previously of Quill and inventor of North Drums). During their time there, they also played several times with Jeff "Skunk" Baxter. In 1972, Rounder Records, whose name was partially inspired by the group, wanted to record a Stampfel and Weber album. Luke Faust and Remaily participated in the sessions that became the band's sixth album Alleged in Their Own Time but it mostly featured recordings of just Stampfel and Weber. The album would not be released until 1975.

Soon after the band's return from a three month tour of Europe, which Stampfel did not participate in, the Holy Modal Rounders relocated to Portland, Oregon in late 1972. Stampfel stayed behind in New York, effectively leaving the group. In 1975, Jeffrey Frederick also moved to Portland where he utilized the Rounders (minus Weber) as his backing band, calling them the Clamtones. The band continued to play with Weber as the Holy Modal Rounders. A retrospective live album of the Portland Rounders from a 1976 radio show was released as Steve Weber and the Holy Modal Rounders, B.C. in 2006 by Frederick Productions.

In early 1974, the Rounders' version of "Boobs a Lot" bubbled under Billboard's Hot 100 at 103. Sales were driven by a number of radio shows playing the song, including Dr. Demento's. From 1971 to 2022, Demento played it 167 times. "Boobs a Lot" was featured on Demento's compilation album Dr. Demento's Delights in 1975.

In 1975, Stampfel (without Weber) formed the Unholy Modal Rounders. The band featured Stampfel on fiddle, Paul Presti on lead guitar, Charlie Messing on rhythm guitar, Kirby Pines on bass, and occasionally Jeff Berman on drums. The group joined Michael Hurley, Jeffrey Frederick, and the Clamtones in the studio to record the collaborative 1976 album Have Moicy!, but because they were newly formed at the time, only Stampfel and Presti went to the studio to represent the Unholy Modal Rounders. Rock critic Robert Christgau was an early fan of Have Moicy! and ranked it his favorite album of the year for his ballot in the annual Pazz & Jop poll. Richie Unterberger noted in 1998 that Have Moicy! was "one of the most critically acclaimed folk records of the last 25 years." The Unholy Modal Rounders would break up in 1977 with only the collaborative album to their name, but their final live performance together would be retrospectively released by Don Giovanni Records in 2024 as Unholier Than Thou: 7/7/77.

In 1977, when the Holy Modal Rounders visited the East Coast for a funeral, Stampfel reunited with them and recorded Last Round, which was released in 1978. The Portland incarnation of the Rounders broke up not long after, but they continued to live in the Portland area and reunited annually. In 1979, Stampfel and Weber reunited when Weber visited the East Coast. They recorded Going Nowhere Fast, their first album as a twosome in over 15 years, which was released in 1981.

=== 1982–2003: Later activity and reunions ===
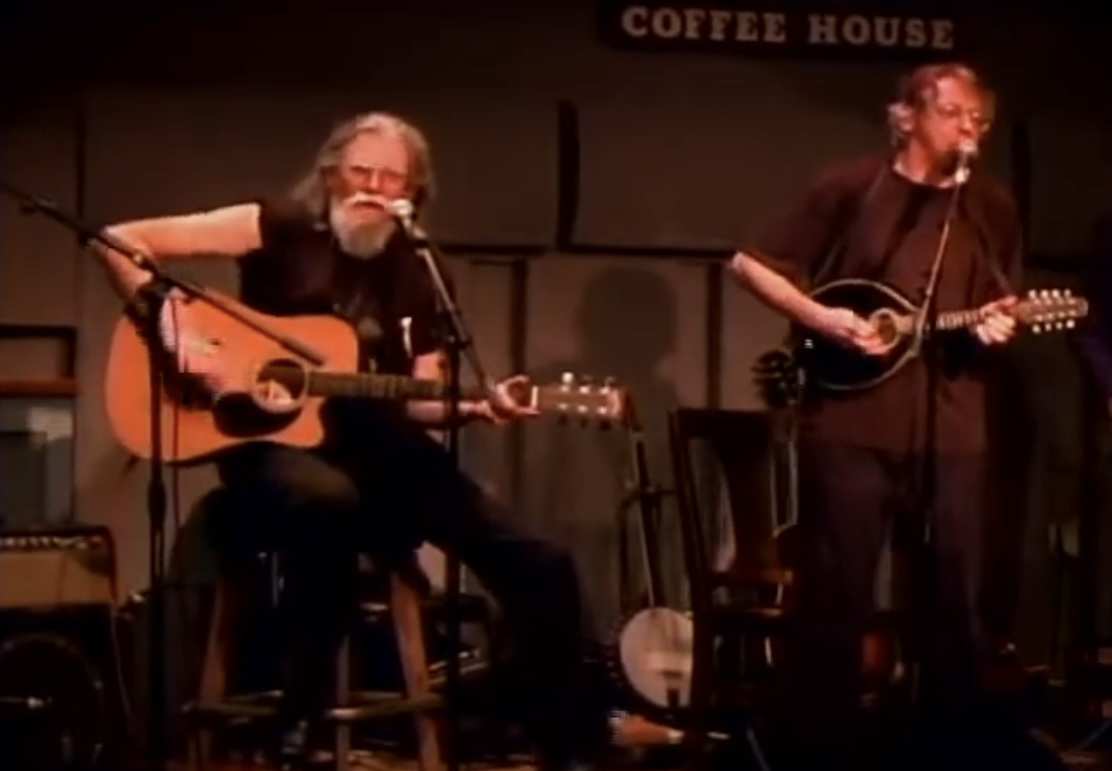
Weber (left) and Stampfel perform a reunion gig in the early 2000s

During the Rounders' time in Portland, Stampfel took a day job at his wife Betsy Wollheim's publishing company DAW Books in 1981. However, he continued to stay active musically during this time, most notably forming the Bottlecaps, who would release three albums. In 1998, Stampfel won a Grammy Award for writing part of the liner notes for the CD reissue of the Anthology of American Folk Music.

In the mid-1990s, Weber left Portland and returned to his native Pennsylvania after years of substance abuse issues. With Weber back on the East Coast, Stampfel and Weber reunited in 1996 at the Bottom Line, which began a series of reunions for the duo. Neil Strauss of The New York Times reviewed the show at the Bottom Line as "intimate, spontaneous and extraordinary." They then released Too Much Fun!, with contributions from Dave Reisch and guest slide guitarist Don Rooke, under the Rounders name in 1999.

In 2003, the duo intended to reunite for a 40th anniversary show but Weber unexpectedly did not show up. This was captured in the 2006 documentary film The Holy Modal Rounders: Bound to Lose, which was co-directed and co-produced by Paul Lovelace and Sam Douglas. Weber later explained that he did not show up because he felt misrepresented by the filmmakers and was disappointed at the lack of attention directed to the band's days in Portland. Bound to Lose, shot primarily between 2000 and 2003, included appearances from fellow musicians Dave Van Ronk, Peter Tork, John Sebastian, Loudon Wainwright III, Ed Sanders, Tuli Kupferberg, Ira Kaplan and Sam Shepard.

Steve Weber died on February 7, 2020, aged 76, in Mount Clare, West Virginia. Stampfel noted after Weber's death that he hadn't seen Weber since 2002 and they had last corresponded via email in 2003 when they were arranging the 40th anniversary show.

== Legacy ==
=== Cult status ===
The band has been described as a cult act. Rolling Stone magazine dubbed the Holy Modal Rounders "one of rock's greatest cult bands." The Seattle Times said "in the subculture of obscure music groups, the Rounders may be in a class of their own for deficiency of fame as well as longevity. For more than 40 years, this freakadelic folk-rock band... had lasting influence on fans wild and crazy enough to be in on the acquired-taste secret of their art." For the band's retrospective compilation I Make a Wish for a Potato, John Swenson reflected that the Rounders "resolutely pursued their eccentric muses despite an almost complete lack of interest from the general public." Writing for AllMusic, Richie Unterberger called the band "almost the very definition of a cult act... Their audience was small because their music was too strange, idiosyncratic, and at times downright dissonant for mainstream listeners to abide."

The band's frequent drug use as well as Stampfel and Weber's creative differences limited their chances of a breakthrough into mainstream success. Peter Stampfel reflected that "there was just too much drugs, alcohol, and bad attitude in the band" to "capitalize on our positive aspects." After observing Stampfel and Weber's interactions during the filming of the documentary Bound to Lose, Paul Lovelace said "they really are like an old married couple. They love each other to death at times, but they also just can't stand being around each other at times." In 1996 while reviewing their reunion at the Bottom Line, Neil Strauss of The New York Times reported that "watching Mr. Stampfel and Mr. Weber during their two sets on Friday was like watching oil and water force themselves to mix." NPR noted that the band exhibited "self-destructive behavior" that led to an early breakup and an inability to capitalize on the inclusion of "Bird Song" on Easy Rider's commercially successful soundtrack. Dave Van Ronk thought similarly: "that was their moment right there. If they had been able to capitalize on [Easy Rider], they would have been two very very wealthy men. But somehow or another it just didn't happen."

=== Critical analysis ===
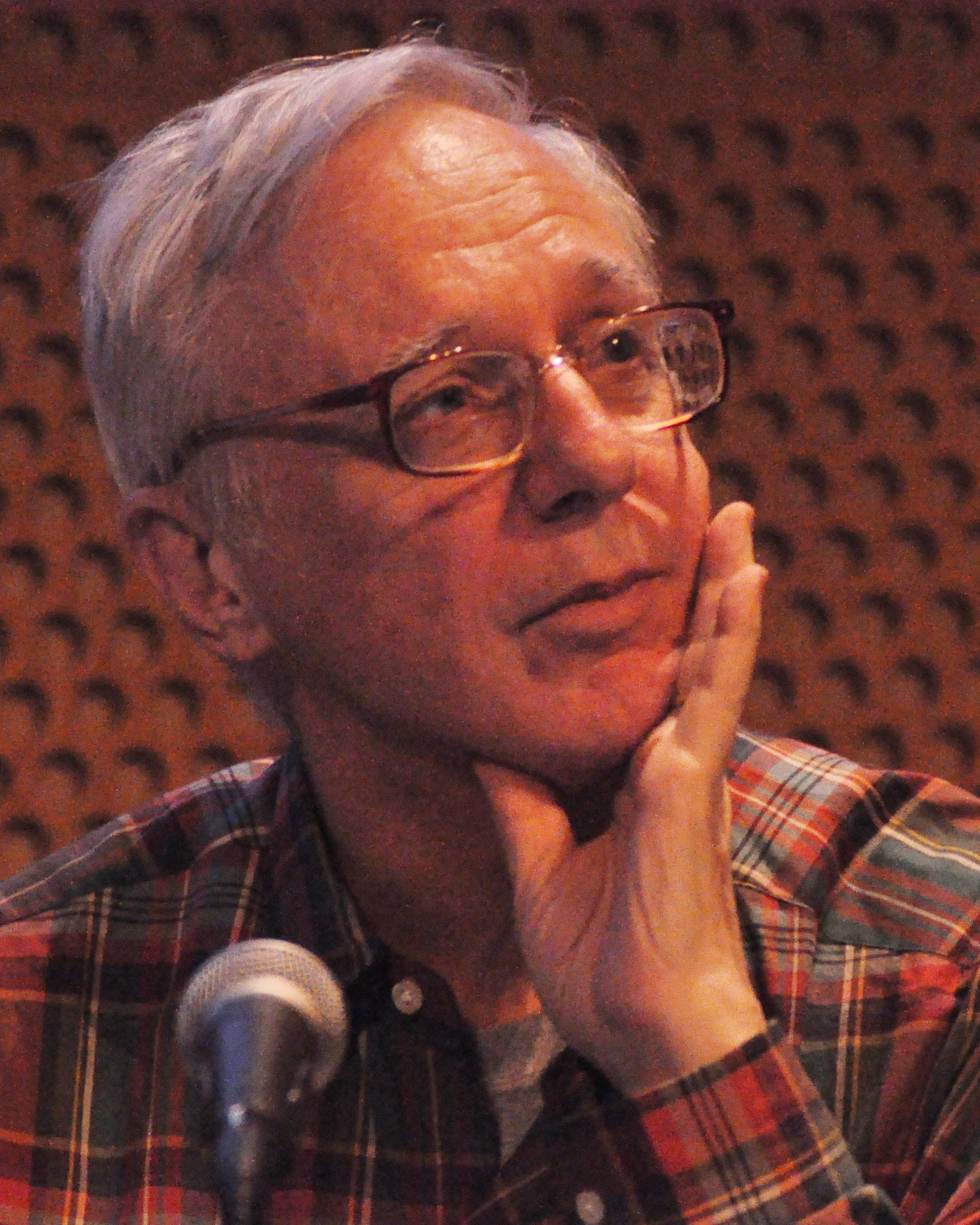
Music critic Robert Christgau has frequently praised the Holy Modal Rounders, particularly Peter Stampfel

Despite the band's limited critical and commercial success during their initial run in the 1960s and 1970s, they have since earned significant praise, in particular for their groundbreaking reworking of early 20th century American folk music. Music journalist Greil Marcus used the Holy Modal Rounders as the earliest example of old-time music being reinvented with modern aesthetics, commenting that they were "incapable of taking anything seriously, but nevertheless [got] to the bottom of folk songs other people sang as if they were obvious." The band has frequently been lumped into what Marcus coined as "old weird America", which refers to the type of music collected on Anthology of American Folk Music. Michael Simmons also noted the band's trail-blazing aesthetics, saying that "the story of the Rounders is one of the grand secret histories of 20th-century American music. If music history is often a game of Who Came First?, then the Rounders can be said to be the first psychedelic hippie freak band and the first aggressively anti-purist folkies, making them a crucial missing link between early- and late-20th-century pop."

The band's first two albums have been retrospectively called early forerunners of the genre freak folk. While reviewing the 1999 reissue 1 & 2 that combined the albums, Robert Christgau declared that "freak folk started here." The band's two psychedelic albums, Indian War Whoop and The Moray Eels Eat the Holy Modal Rounders, have also been highlighted as pioneering and innovative for their time. Ben Sisario of The New York Times observed in 2020 that the two albums "still stand as extreme examples of acid-tinged folk music." Michael Simmons praised The Moray Eels in particular, saying "the [Rounders] album that's received the most scrutiny is 1968's The Moray Eels... Some (including yours truly) claim it's a psychedelic masterpiece; others say it's masturbatory excess typical of the era." In the 1983 edition of The Rolling Stone Album Guide, Billy Altman highlighted The Moray Eels as the band's best album and bemoaned that it was (at the time) out of print. However, in the fourth edition of The Rolling Stone Album Guide, Tom Hull re-evaluated Indian War Whoop and The Moray Eels as "curiosities, conceived as psychedelia and sloppily executed" while more highly recommending 1 & 2. Hull saved the highest recommendation for the collaborative album Have Moicy!, which was awarded five stars and emphasized as "an improbable masterpiece".

Both Stampfel and Weber have been singled out for praise when reviewers discuss the Rounders' legacy. Music critic Eric Weisbard, writing for Spin in 1999, declared that "Stampfel has become to roots music what Jon Langford is to punk: the patron saint of lost causes and good times in spite of them." Robert Christgau had similar high praise, believing that the Holy Modal Rounders, like Bob Dylan, "greatly transcend" the New York folk scene they began in and that "next to Bob Dylan, Stampfel is the closest thing to a genius" to come out of the 1960s folk revival. Christgau also praised Weber, calling him an "ace guitarist" who "can just not give a fuck while remaining both charming and musical." Jason Weiss observed that "from the start, [Weber] was recognized for his technique and divine spontaneity he brought to old-time music." Sisario also noted Weber's "mastery of traditional guitar styles". Billy Altman famously wrote that "Stampfel ... has a working knowledge of almost every song ever written, and Weber ... only sometimes has a working knowledge of his own compositions."

=== Influence and tributes ===
While Stampfel was dismissive of the Holy Modal Rounders' influence in the late 1990s, calling it "practically nonexistent" outside of the Portland music scene, others have disagreed. Writing for New Haven Independent, Eleanor Polak discussed how the band had not just had significant influence, but that they had also inspired "countless other musicians to take deep dives into American folk music to find the dark and weird within." Ben Sisario wrote that the band's music has served as inspiration to "generations of underground musicians". Jeffrey Lewis has cited the band as an influence for his brand of anti-folk. NPR mentioned Yo La Tengo and Espers as newer bands influenced by the group. The Anniversary named the Rounders as an influence on their 2002 album Your Majesty. Space Needle named their 1997 studio album The Moray Eels Eat the Space Needle in reference to the Rounders' 1968 album.

Rounder Records was named partially as a tribute to the Holy Modal Rounders. The label would release several of the band's studio albums after its formation in 1970. In 2008, the Holy Modal Rounders were inducted into the Oregon Music Hall of Fame for their long stay in the state and their influence on the Portland music scene.

== Band members ==
The list below is adapted from the list the documentary The Holy Modal Rounders: Bound to Lose provides during the credits. Intervals for Tyler, Remaily, Deane, Reisch, North, and Shepard are included in film.

- Peter Stampfel – vocals, fiddle, banjo (1963-2003)
- Steve Weber – vocals, guitar (1963–2003)
- Sam Shepard – drums (1967–1970)
- Antonia – songwriter
- John Annis – bass (1968-1971)
- Richard Tyler – piano (1968–1986, died 1986)
- Michael McCarty – drums (1969–1971)
- Robin Remaily – vocals, guitar, mandolin, fiddle (1970–2003)
- Dave Reisch – bass (1971–2003)
- Ted Deane – saxophone (1971–2003)
- Roger North – drums (1971–2003)
- Luke Faust (1972)

== Discography ==
Studio albums

- The Holy Modal Rounders (1964)
- The Holy Modal Rounders 2 (1965)
- Indian War Whoop (1967)
- The Moray Eels Eat The Holy Modal Rounders (1968)
- Good Taste Is Timeless (1971)
- Alleged in Their Own Time (1975)
- Last Round (1978)
- Going Nowhere Fast (1980)
- Too Much Fun! (1999)

Compilations

- Stampfel & Weber (1972)
- 1 & 2 (1999)
- I Make a Wish for a Potato (2001)

Live albums

- Live in 1965 (2002)
- Bird Song: Live 1971 (2004)
- Steve Weber and the Holy Modal Rounders, B.C. (2005)

Albums by The Fugs featuring Stampfel and Weber

- The Fugs First Album (1965)
- Virgin Fugs (1967)
- Fugs 4, Rounders Score (1975)

The Unholy Modal Rounders

- Have Moicy! (1976) (with Michael Hurley, Jeffrey Frederick, and the Clamtones)
- Unholier Than Thou: 7/7/77 (2024)
