= Lord William =

Folk song

Lord William, Sweet William or Lord Lundy (Child # 254, Roud # 106) is a traditional Scottish folk ballad telling how a pair of lovers, William and Janet, outwit her father, her bethrothed (by arrangement) and the priest in order to marry one other.

== Synopsis ==
Lord William has a love affair with Janet, the only daughter of Lord Lundy, a Scottish nobleman. While William is away on a voyage of discovery, her father finds out about the romance and declares that she must marry another man, who, in some versions, is the heir to the English crown. Janet says that she will obey her father's orders but adds that she would rather die. In another version, Lord Lundy threatens to murder her if she refuses to go through with the marriage. When the wedding day arrives and the priest is about to read the matrimonial orders, Janet asks him to wait for one of her female friends to arrive. This makes the priest angry but his rebukes are cut short by the arrival of Sweet William dressed in his finest suit of armour declaring that he is the rightful groom and that the other man should step aside. Lord Lundy is furious but there is nothing that he can do and Janet and William are married.
