= Oregon Music Hall of Fame =

American music award

Logo

The Oregon Music Hall of Fame is an award honoring musicians from the U.S. state of Oregon. The first induction ceremony took place on October 13, 2007.

== History ==
The Oregon Music Hall of Fame was conceived of in the 1990s by a group called the Oregon Music Coalition. Over the years they elected 50 Oregon musicians and bands to the hall of fame. The group eventually disbanded, but in 2004, the hall of fame was revitalized, became a 501c3, and a group reformed as the Oregon Music Hall of Fame non-profit organization.

The original inductees will continue to be honored, while new nominees will include musicians, producers, disc jockeys, and promoters. The group plans to build an Oregon Music Hall of Fame building that will house music exhibits and memorabilia and host music education seminars. The group's current activities include collecting Oregon music memorabilia, providing music scholarships to college-bound musicians, and promoting music education in Oregon elementary and middle schools.

== Inductees ==
Along with the original 50 inductees, six new honorees were inducted into the hall of fame in 2007: Elliott Smith, Oregon, Obo Addy, The Crazy 8's, Roger Hart, DJ and manager of Paul Revere & the Raiders, and club promoter and band manager Tony DeMicoli. Performers at the ceremony included The Kingsmen, Mason Williams, Mark Lindsay, and Everclear.

== See also ==
- Music of Oregon
