= Peter Stampfel =

American musician

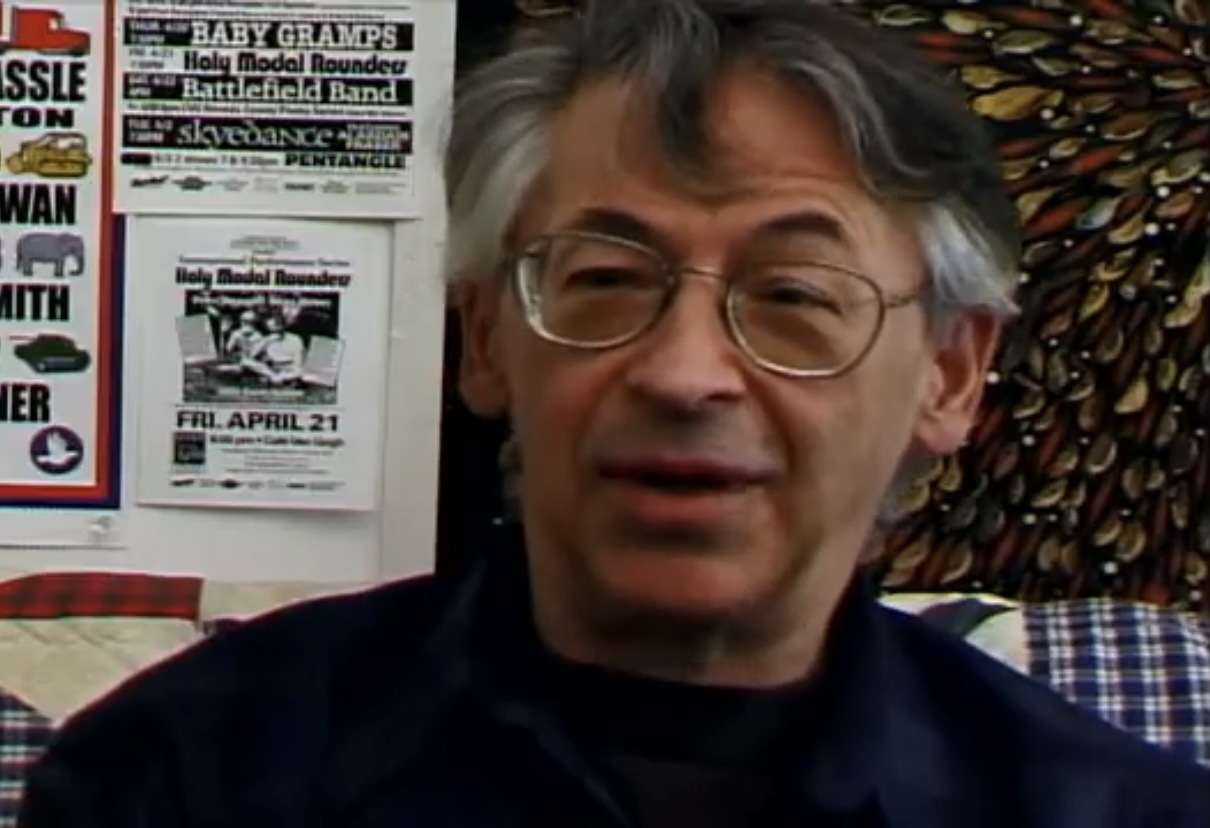
- Stampfel in 2000
- Born: October 29, 1938 (age 87); Wauwatosa, Wisconsin, United States
- Occupation: Associate editor at DAW Books
- Spouse(s): Betsy Wollheim (1970s-present, as of 2020); Antonia (a.k.a. Barbara Ann Goldblatt, 1960s–1970s, d. 2017)
- Musical career
- Genres: Folk
- Occupations: Singer-songwriter, musician
- Instruments: fiddle, violin, harmonica, guitar, banjo
- Years active: 1963–present
- Labels: Don Giovanni; Rounder; Homestead

Peter Stampfel (born October 29, 1938) is an American fiddle player, old-time musician, and singer-songwriter. He is best known as a founding member of The Holy Modal Rounders, which he formed with guitarist Steve Weber in 1963 in New York City. The Rounders' early recordings are cited as among the first examples of psychedelic folk and freak folk. Music critic Robert Christgau declared that "next to Bob Dylan, Stampfel is the closest thing to a genius" to emerge from the New York folk revival of the 1960s.

== Biography ==
=== Early life and musical formation ===
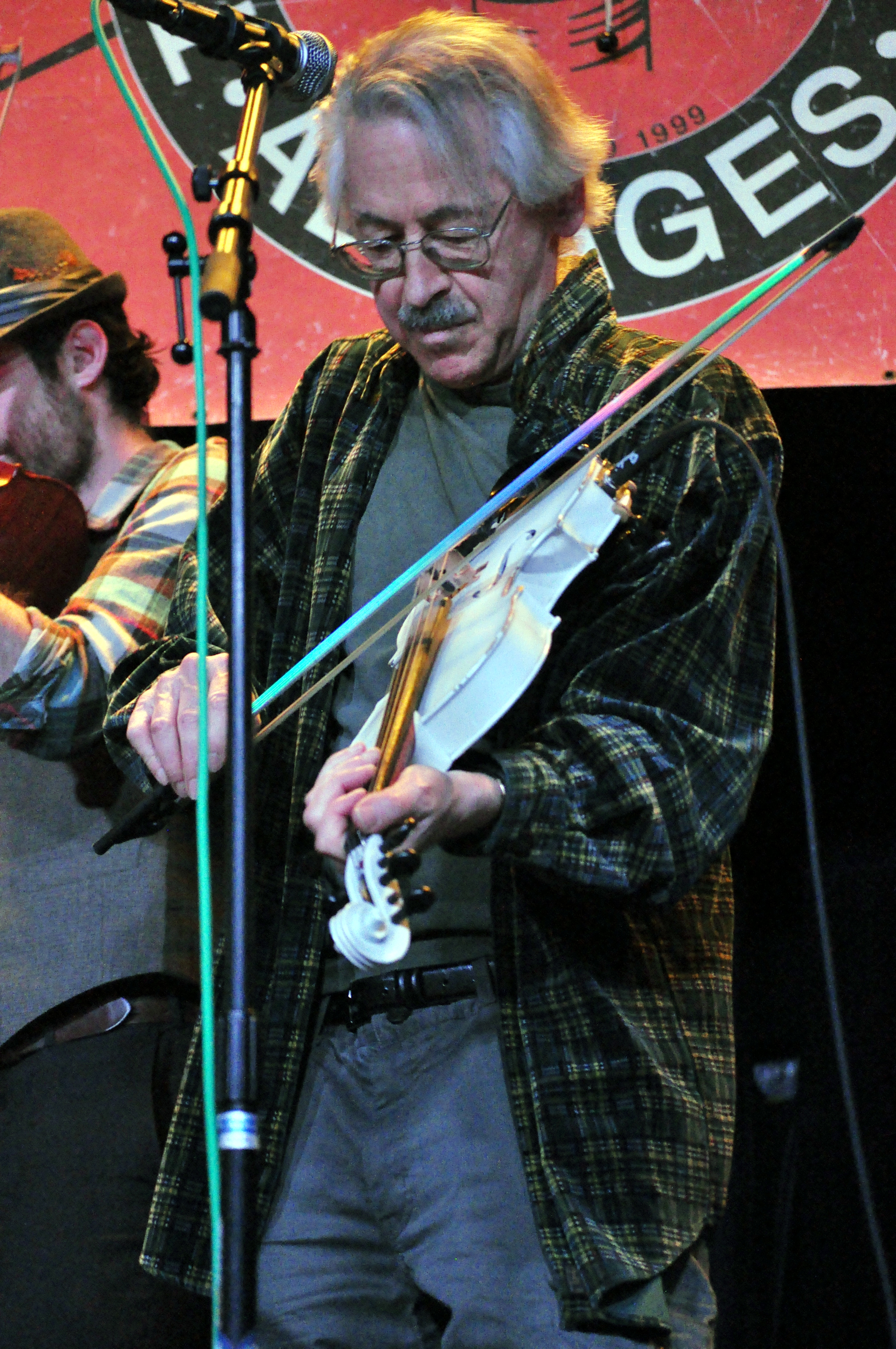
Stampfel performs in 2012

Peter Stampfel was born on October 29, 1938, in Wauwatosa, Wisconsin, a suburb of Milwaukee. In the late 1950s, he relocated to New York City, settling in Greenwich Village and the Lower East Side, joining the emerging American folk music revival scene just as Bob Dylan and others were arriving. In 1961, Stampfel was living on MacDougal Street and playing more traditional roots music at local coffeehouses. Dylan was a fan, listing Stampfel among his favorite singers in a 1961 interview. He was deeply influenced by Harry Smith's Anthology of American Folk Music.

=== The Holy Modal Rounders ===
In May 1963, Stampfel was introduced to guitarist Steve Weber by his then-girlfriend Antonia Duren (known mononymously as Antonia). Stampfel described his founding idea as asking what would happen if Charlie Poole and Uncle Dave Macon were transported to 1963 and exposed to contemporary rock and roll. The two began performing together, and in 1963 were signed to Prestige Records by producer Paul A. Rothchild. Their self-titled debut (1964) and follow-up The Holy Modal Rounders 2 (1965), produced by Sam Charters and Larry Schreiber, combined traditional folk and old-time material with rewritten, often drug-referencing lyrics.

In late 1964, Stampfel and Weber joined The Fugs, the underground rock band formed by Beat poets Ed Sanders and Tuli Kupferberg, whose first public performance, at Sanders's Peace Eye bookstore on February 24, 1965, was attended by Andy Warhol, William Burroughs, and George Plimpton. Stampfel contributed to the sessions that became The Fugs First Album (1966), before departing in July 1965, citing frustration with Weber's erratic behavior and unwillingness to rehearse new material.

After leaving the Fugs, Stampfel formed the Moray Eels with Antonia and, soon after, playwright Sam Shepard on drums, a collaboration Stampfel initiated after meeting Shepard in September 1966. The group reunited with Weber at the behest of ESP-Disk founder Bernard Stollman in 1967 to record Indian War Whoop, a psychedelic departure from their earlier old-time recordings. The band, now officially reconstituted as the Holy Modal Rounders, moved briefly to California in 1968 to record The Moray Eels Eat The Holy Modal Rounders for Elektra Records.

While in California, the band opened for Pink Floyd in San Francisco and Ike and Tina Turner in Los Angeles, and performed on Rowan & Martin's Laugh-In. The highlight of their wider exposure came in 1969, when their song "If You Want to Be a Bird (Bird Song)" was included in Dennis Hopper's film Easy Rider, whose soundtrack reached number 6 on the Billboard chart. In 1972, Weber and the rest of the band relocated to Portland, Oregon. Stampfel stayed in New York, effectively separating from the group, though he would collaborate with them sporadically in the following decades.

=== Solo career and collaborations (1972–1995) ===
In 1975, Stampfel formed the Unholy Modal Rounders, a separate band that joined Michael Hurley, Jeffrey Frederick, and the Clamtones to record the collaborative album Have Moicy! (1976). The Unholy Modal Rounders' final live performance, from July 7, 1977, was released by Don Giovanni Records in 2024 as Unholier Than Thou: 7/7/77.

In 1977, Stampfel rejoined Weber and the Portland lineup to record Last Round (1978), and in 1981, the two released Going Nowhere Fast, their first duo album in over fifteen years. Stampfel took a day job that same year at DAW Books, the science fiction publishing company run by his wife Betsy Wollheim, where he has served as an associate editor.

In 1996, Stampfel and Weber reunited for a performance at the Bottom Line in New York, which The New York Times described as "intimate, spontaneous and extraordinary." This began a series of reunion performances and resulted in the album Too Much Fun! (1999). In 1998, Stampfel won a Grammy Award for his contribution to the liner notes of the CD reissue of the Anthology of American Folk Music.

Stampfel has remained prolific in later life, releasing recordings on Don Giovanni Records and collaborating with a wide range of artists including They Might Be Giants, Yo La Tengo, Jeffrey Lewis, Jeffrey Frederick, Bongwater, Michael Hurley, and Baby Gramps. He has performed with Bob Dylan, Roches, Richard Barone and Loudon Wainwright III. Stampfel has been the leader of several musical projects, including the Bottlecaps, the Du-Tels, and the WORM All-Stars.

== Legacy and influence ==
Music journalist Greil Marcus used the Holy Modal Rounders as the earliest example of old-time music being reinvented with modern aesthetics, commenting that they were "incapable of taking anything seriously, but nevertheless [got] to the bottom of folk songs other people sang as if they were obvious." Writing for Spin in 1999, Eric Weisbard declared that "Stampfel has become to roots music what Jon Langford is to punk: the patron saint of lost causes and good times in spite of them."

== Personal life ==
Stampfel was married to Antonia (Barbara Ann Goldblatt), a songwriter and collaborator who contributed lyrics to several Rounders-era recordings, in the 1960s and early 1970s; she died in 2017. He married Betsy Wollheim in the 1970s, publisher at DAW Books. They have two daughters and reside in New York City.

== Discography ==
Solo

- May 1994 Hello CD of the Month (1994)
- You Must Remember This... (1995)
- Dook of the Beatniks (2010)
- Better Than Expected (2014)
- Holiday For Strings (2016)
- The Cambrian Explosion (2017)
- The Ordovician Era (2019)
- Peter Stampfel's 20th Century in 100 Songs (2021)
- Song Shards: Soul Jingles, Stoic Jingles, Vintage Jingles, Prayers and Rounds (2025)

The Fugs

- Virgin Fugs (1966)

Holy Modal Rounders

- The Holy Modal Rounders (1964)
- The Holy Modal Rounders 2 (1965)
- Indian War Whoop (1967)
- The Moray Eels Eat The Holy Modal Rounders (1968)
- Good Taste Is Timeless (1971)
- Alleged in Their Own Time (1975)
- Last Round (1978)
- Going Nowhere Fast (1981)
- Too Much Fun! (1999)

with the Bottlecaps

- Peter Stampfel & the Bottlecaps (1986)
- People's Republic of Rock 'n' Roll (1989)
- The Jig Is Up (2004)

with Zoë Stampfel

- Ass in the Air (2010)

with Baby Gramps

- Outertainment (2010)

with Jeffrey Lewis

- Come On Board (2011)
- Hey Hey, it's... The Jeffrey Lewis & Peter Stampfel Band (2013)
- Have Moicy 2: The Hoodoo Bash (2015)
- Both Ways (2021)

with Luke Faust

- Wendigo Dwain Story (2011)

with the Unholy Modal Rounders and others

- Have Moicy! (1976)

with the WORM All-Stars

- A Sure Sign of Something (2011)
