= Steve Weber =

American folk musician (1943–2020)

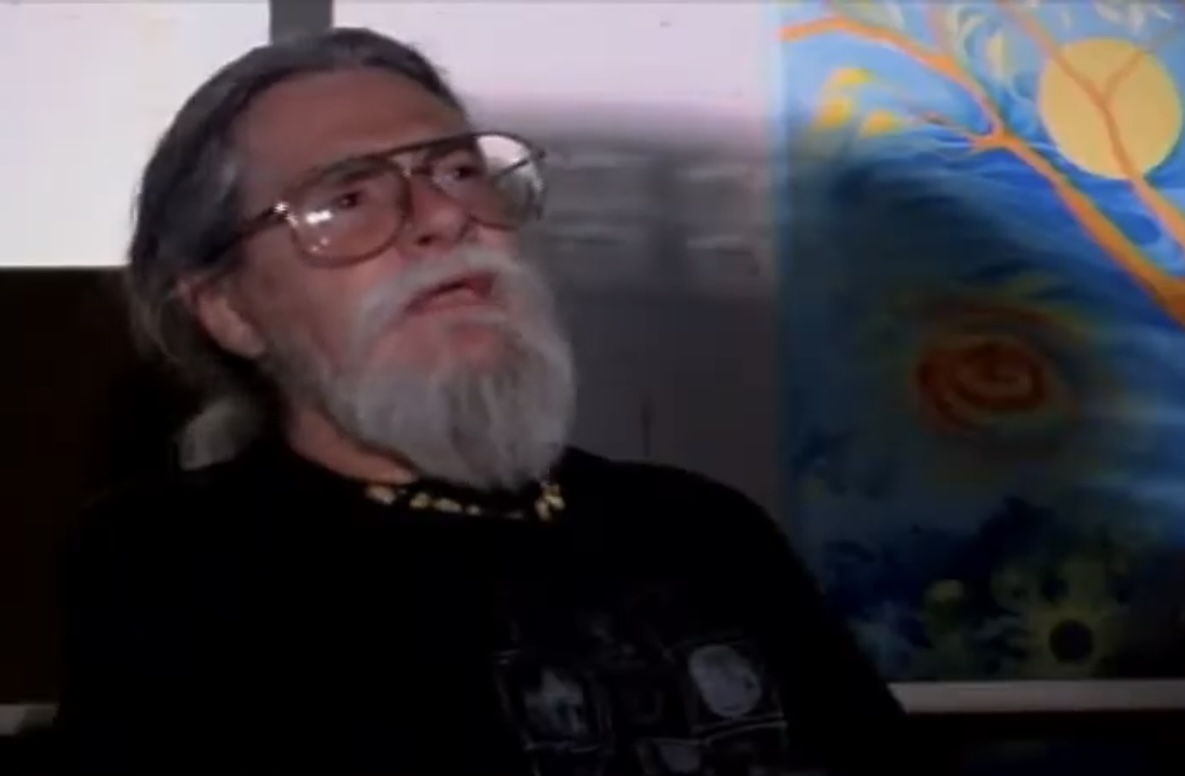
- Weber sometime between 2000 and 2003

Background information
- Born: Steven P. Weber; June 22, 1943; Philadelphia, Pennsylvania, United States
- Died: February 7, 2020 (aged 76) Mount Clare, West Virginia, United States
- Genres: Folk
- Occupation: Singer-songwriter
- Instrument: Guitar
- Years active: 1963–2003
- Formerly of: The Holy Modal Rounders, The Fugs

Steven P. Weber (June 22, 1943 – February 7, 2020) was an American folk singer-songwriter and guitarist.

Weber is best known as a member of The Holy Modal Rounders, a psychedelic folk band that he founded with Peter Stampfel. He and Stampfel were also briefly members of The Fugs.

== Life and career ==
Weber was born in Philadelphia in 1943 and moved with his mother to Buckingham in Bucks County, Pennsylvania. In Bucks County he met musicians such as Robin Remaily, who would later join the Holy Modal Rounders, and Michael Hurley, who was long associated with the band.

In 1963, Weber met Peter Stampfel in New York City, introduced by the Greenwich Village figure Antonia, who had dated Weber and would later marry Stampfel. Weber and Stampfel formed the Holy Modal Rounders as an acoustic duo and released two records on the Prestige Folklore label: The Holy Modal Rounders (1964) and The Holy Modal Rounders 2 (1965). While most of the songs were traditional folk standards revised in a contemporary style, they recorded some originals, including "Hey, Hey Baby" written by Weber and "Junko Partner" co-written by Weber and Michael Hurley.

After the release of the second Rounders album, Weber and Stampfel joined Ed Sanders and Tuli Kupferberg in the Fugs for a short time. Their 1965 recordings with the Fugs are on the albums The Village Fugs, Virgin Fugs, and Fugs 4, Rounders Score. Weber wrote the cult classic "Boobs a Lot" for the Fugs, which the Rounders later recorded on the album Good Taste Is Timeless.

After leaving the Fugs, Weber and Stampfel reunited as the Rounders and recorded a third album, Indian War Whoop (ESP-Disk, 1967), adding Sam Shepard and Lee Crabtree to the group. Their fourth album, The Moray Eels Eat The Holy Modal Rounders (Elektra, 1968), recorded with Shepard, Ken Crabtree, and Richard Tyler, included Antonia's composition "Bird Song," which was featured in Dennis Hopper's film Easy Rider (retitled "If You Want To Be A Bird").

After Weber and Stampfel were unable to capitalize on the success of Easy Rider as well as an appearance on Rowan & Martin's Laugh-In, their relationship grew increasingly contentious. In 1972, after the release of Good Taste Is Timeless (Metromedia, 1971), Stampfel decided to stay in New York while Weber and the rest of the band relocated to Portland, Oregon. The band continued to release albums, including Alleged in Their Own Time (Rounder, 1975) and Last Round (Adelphi, 1978). After another break-up of the band, they reunited again for Going Nowhere Fast (Rounder, 1981), recorded as a duo and credited as Stampfel & Weber.

Weber continued to tour with Portland-based band members as The Holy Modal Rounders without Stampfel. After years of drug and alcohol abuse on the West Coast, Weber decided in the mid-1990s to return east, moving in with his mother on a farm in Buckingham, Pennsylvania. Weber and Stampfel played together again in New York City at The Bottom Line in 1996 and reunited the Rounders for Too Much Fun! (Rounder, 1999). The original Rounders performed together for the last time in 2002.

As captured by the 2006 documentary film The Holy Modal Rounders... Bound To Lose, Weber and Stampfel's relationship grew contentious again, with Weber failing to show up for a 40th-anniversary concert for the Rounders in 2003. The album Holy Modal Rounders B.C. (Frederick Productions, 2006), credited to Steve Weber & The Holy Modal Rounders, was released, a recording from a concert for a Vancouver radio show in 1976 documenting the Portland-based, Weber-led version of the Rounders.

After the release of Bound to Lose, which he felt was deceptively edited, Weber broke off his connections with the Holy Modal Rounders. Retiring from his musical career, he moved to Mount Clare, West Virginia, where he died on February 7, 2020, at the age of 76.
