= Michael Hurley (musician) =

American folk singer-songwriter (1941–2025)

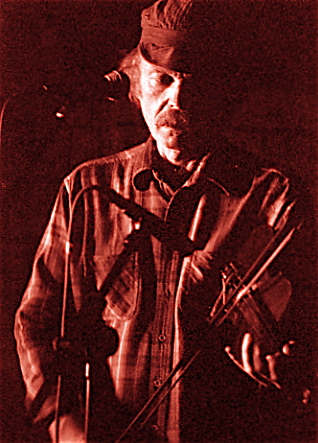
- Hurley performing in 2006

Background information
- Born: December 20, 1941; Jersey City, New Jersey, U.S.
- Died: April 1, 2025 (aged 83) Portland, Oregon, U.S.
- Genres: Traditional folk; outsider
- Occupation: Musician
- Instruments: Vocals; guitar; fiddle; banjo
- Years active: 1963–2025

Michael Hurley (December 20, 1941 – April 1, 2025) was an American folk singer-songwriter who was a part of the Greenwich Village folk music scene of the 1960s and 1970s. In addition to playing a wide variety of instruments, Hurley was also a cartoonist and a painter.

Hurley's music has been described as "outsider folk".

== Career ==
Before starting his recording career Hurley contracted mononucleosis and needed to wait several years until he could sign to a record label. Hurley's debut album, First Songs, was recorded for Folkways Records in 1963, on the same reel-to-reel machine that taped Lead Belly's Last Sessions. He was discovered by blues and jazz historian Frederick Ramsey III, and subsequently championed by boyhood friend Jesse Colin Young, who released his second and third albums on The Youngbloods' Warner Bros. imprint, Raccoon.

Hurley spent much of the early 1970s as an itinerant performer in Vermont, working odd jobs on the side. In the late 1970s, Hurley made three albums for Rounder, all of which have since been reissued on CD. His 1976 LP Have Moicy!, a collaboration with Peter Stampfel and the Unholy Modal Rounders (a spin-off of the Holy Modal Rounders) and Jeffrey Frederick & The Clamtones, received much critical praise. Music critic Robert Christgau ranked it as his favorite album of the year.

In 1996, Koch Records released Wolfways with Hurley backed by Mickey Bones on drums. Tours with Son Volt and high praise from younger performers like Lucinda Williams, Vic Chesnutt, Woods, Calexico, Cat Power, Julian Lynch, and Robin Holcomb followed.

In the 2000 film Hamlet, the main character listens to Hurley's song "Wild Geeses" while making a video that stands in for the original's "Murder of Gonzago" play-within-a-play "to catch the conscience" of King Claudius.

In 2001, Locust Music reissued Hurley's debut under the new title Blueberry Wine, with new artwork contributed by Hurley.

Gnomonsong released a new Michael Hurley album titled Ancestral Swamp on September 18, 2007. Backing was provided by longtime Hurley associate David Reisch of the Holy Modal Rounders and new friends Tara Jane O'Neil and Lewi Longmire.

In 2010, Secret Seven Records (San Francisco) and Mississippi Records (Portland) teamed up to reissue 100 copies of Hurley's rarest album, Blue Navigator, on 8-track tape. (Hurley was a long-time collector of music on 8-track tapes.)

In 2011, Hurley's first book of lyrics was released by the Quebec book publisher L'Oie de Cravan. It contains the original English lyrics to 19 of his songs calligraphed by the author, a foreword by critic Byron Coley and a French version by Marie Frankland, winner of the 2007 John-Glassco prize for translation.

Hurley performed at the annual Nelsonville Music Festival in 2008 and 2010–2019, and again in 2022.

His song, "Hog of the Forsaken", was used in the closing credits for the pilot episode of the series and the closing of Deadwood: The Movie.

Hurley appears in the Oregon-set family drama film Leave No Trace (2018), where he performs "O My Stars" at a bonfire alongside fellow Oregon-based musician Marisa Anderson.

He lived in Brownsmead in rural northwest Oregon and performed frequently in and around Portland.

In 2021 Hurley released a new album titled The Time of the Foxgloves. The New Yorker's Amanda Petrusich included it in her 10 best albums of the year list.

== Personal life ==
Hurley was born in Jersey City, New Jersey, on December 20, 1941, and grew up in Bucks County, Pennsylvania. He began playing and writing songs at the age of 13. He recorded his first album, First Songs at the age of 22. He also lived in New Jersey, Massachusetts, California, Vermont, Ohio, Florida, and most recently in Oregon.

Hurley self-published at least three magazines. The Underground Monthly, The Outcry, and The Morning Tea. He also created several comic books featuring Jocko and Boone, Greenbriar Kornbread, and Mama Molasses, among other characters.

Hurley liked to call himself Elwood Snock, Doc Snock, Snockman, The Snock, or Snock. Hurley did much of the artwork for his own albums. Two oft-featured cartoon werewolves, Jocko and Boone, were something of a theme across Hurley's musical career, even appearing in their own comics. Both are based on dogs that Hurley's family owned when he was a child.

Hurley had three children with his former wife, Marjorie, whom he called "Pasta", two sons, Jordan and Colorado, and a daughter, Daffodil. He had a son, Rollin, with a girlfriend, Kim, and a daughter, Wilder Mountain Honey, with another girlfriend, Bethany.

Hurley died on April 1, 2025, in Portland, Oregon, while being rushed to the hospital after he stopped breathing. He was 83. Hurley was being driven home after returning from playing a show the previous day in Asheville, North Carolina, and also playing two shows at Big Ears Festival on March 28 and 29 in Knoxville, Tennessee.

== Discography ==
Studio Albums

- First Songs (1964) (Folkways)
- Armchair Boogie (1971) (Raccoon/Warner Bros.)
- Hi Fi Snock Uptown (1972) (Raccoon/Warner Bros.)
- Have Moicy! (1975) credited to Michael Hurley/The Unholy Modal Rounders/Jeffrey Frederick & the Clamtones (Rounder)
- Long Journey (1976) (Rounder)
- Snockgrass (1980) (Rounder)
- Blue Navigator (1984) (Rooster)
- Watertower (1988) (Fundamental)
- The Woodbill Brothers (1992) (Bellemeade Phonics)
- Bizeeto's Faves Ltd. (1993) (Bellemeade Phonics)
- Wolfways (1994) (Veracity)
- Parsnip Snips (Recorded 1965-72) (1996) (Bellemeade Phonics)
- Bellemeade Sessions (1997) (Blue Navigator)
- Weatherhole (1999) (Field Recording Co.)
- Blueberry Wine (re-release of First Songs with new artwork) (2001) (Locust Music)
- Sweetkorn (2002) (Trikont/Bellemeade Phonics)
- Down in Dublin (2005) (Blue Navigator)
- Ancestral Swamp (2007) (Gnomonsong)
- Ida Con Snock (2009) (Gnomonsong)
- Blue Hills (2010) (Mississippi Records)
- Fatboy Spring (Recorded 1972-73) (2011) (Mississippi Records)
- Back Home with Drifting Woods (Recorded 1964) (2012) (Mississippi/Nero's Neptune Records)
- Bad Mr. Mike (2016) (Mississippi Records)
- The Time of the Foxgloves (2021) (No Quarter)
- Troubled Waters Soundtrack (Recorded 1984) (2024) (Blue Navigator)
- Broken Homes and Gardens (2025) (No Quarter)

Live Albums

- Land of Lofi and Redbirds (1988) (Bellemeade Phonics)
- Excrusiasion '86 (1988) (Bellemeade Phonics)
- Growlin' Bo Bo (1991) (Bellemeade Phonics)
- Live in Edinburgh (1999) (self-released CDr)
- Still Alive (Bootleg recording) (2005) (CDr)
- Land of LoFi (Re-release of the 1988 portion of Land of Lofi and Redbirds) (2013) (Mississippi Records)
- Redbirds at Folk City (Re-release of the 1976 portion of Land of Lofi and Redbirds) (2017) (Feeding Tube Records)
- Living Ljubljana (2018) (Feeding Tube Records)
- Live Ateliers Claus (Recorded 2013) (2021) (Les Albums Claus)

Singles and EPs

- Wildegeeses / Coloured Birds 7-inch (1993) (Singles Only Label)
- National Weed Growers Association / Slippery Rag 7-inch (1993) (Father Yod etc.)
- Doc Rake Vs Hurley-Man CDr EP with Eugene Chadbourne (2005) (no label)
- Jocko's Lament 7-inch EP with Betsy Nichols (2009) (Mississippi Records)
- Wildegeeses/South in Virginia 7-inch (2013) (Mississippi Records)
- Watertrain / Black & Yellow Bee 78 rpm 10" (2013) (Tompkins Square)
- Three Men Sitting On A Hollow Log / Mabel Green split 7-inch with Cass McCombs (2013) (Secret Seven)
- Bad Monsanto / Mt. Santo 7-inch split with Wes Buckley (2014) (Lucky Peach)
- Charona / Moonman Newfie with Josephine Foster 7-inch (2016) (Mistletone)
- Australia/New Zealand 2016 Cassette tape (2016) (Dream Home)
- Dead Moon Night 7-inch split with Range Rats (2020) (Mississippi Records)
- Slurf Song 7-inch (2024) (People In A Position To Know)
