= Freak folk =

Music genre

- Other names: New Weird America; avant-folk (early)
- Stylistic origins: Psychedelic folk
- Cultural origins: 1960s – 1970s, United States and United Kingdom; 2000s, United States
- Typical instruments: Acoustic guitar; Percussion

Other topics
- Anti-folk; indie folk; neofolk; free folk; wyrd folk; New Weird America

Freak folk is a subgenre of psychedelic folk associated with the 2000s New Weird America movement and used to describe the work of artists such as Joanna Newsom, Devendra Banhart, Animal Collective, and Adem. The term "freak folk" had been in informal use for decades before solidifying into a genre in the mid-2000s. The label was rejected by many of the contemporary artists whose music it was applied to.

== Etymology ==
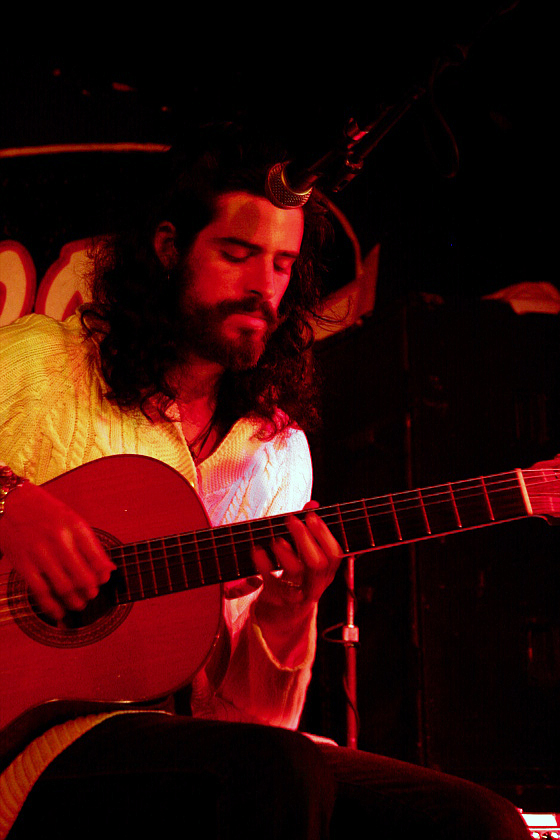
Devendra Banhart compiled The Golden Apples of the Sun, a various artists album which inadvertently helped freak folk solidify into a genre

The etymology of "freak folk" is unclear. According to Stereogum, the term "freak folk" had been in informal use for decades before solidifying into a genre. In Seasons They Change: The Story of Acid and Psychedelic Folk (2010), author Jeanette Leech claims that contemporary usage of the term is likely a bastardization of the term "free folk." For a short period of time, the terms were to a degree used interchangeably, but by 2006 "free folk" was no longer in mainstream use.

In a 1998 review of Beck's Mutations, Joshua Clover, writing for music magazine Spin, described the music as "some old-fashioned freak-folk". In early 2003, music magazine Arthur, one of the earliest outlets to profile freak folk artist Devendra Banhart, called him a "freaked folknik" on the cover of its second issue. On April 1, 2004, Arthur's Bastet imprint released the Banhart-compiled various artists album The Golden Apples of the Sun. According to Pitchfork, the compilation "assisted greatly" in defining the term "freak folk", while Stereogum notes the aftermath of its release as "the moment when a descriptive phrase solidified into a genre".

However, neither the album nor the interviews with Banhart and fellow freak folk artist Joanna Newsom in that month's issue of Arthur featured the term. It did appear in Pitchfork's review of The Golden Apples of the Sun, but it was not yet the default label throughout 2004, with other publications instead using other terms, such as "freaked-out folk", "neo-folk", "antifolk", and "avant-folk". A November 2004 feature by Spin introducing folk artists like Banhart, Newsom, Animal Collective, CocoRosie, and Kimya Dawson observed that their music "often gets lumped under reductive tags like 'neo-folk,' 'anti-folk,' 'avant-folk,' or 'psych-folk.'" However, according to Stereogum, by 2005 the term "freak folk" had already become oversaturated.

=== Controversy ===
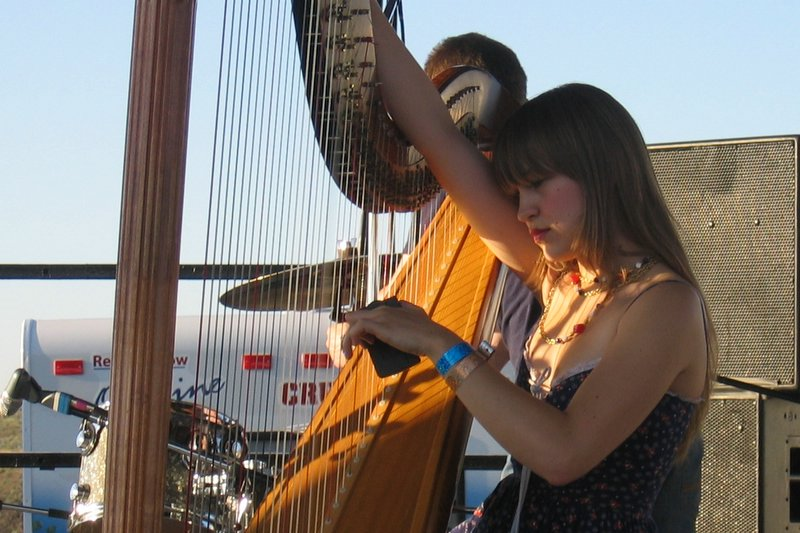
Newsom at the Sasquatch! Music Festival, Washington, May 2005

On December 12, 2004, The New York Times published an article entitled Freak Folk's Very Own Pied Piper, a profile of Devendra Banhart. It also mentioned Joanna Newsom, Animal Collective, and Adem, framing the artists as part of a new genre. In the article, Banhart was quoted as saying: "If you were to ask me how I feel about any of the term freak-folk, it's cool -- you have to call it something -- but we didn't name it. We've been thinking about what to call it, and we just call it the Family."

However, in a November 2010 interview with music magazine Interview, Banhart claimed he was misquoted: "I never, not even jokingly, expressed anything but disdain for [the term "freak folk"]. I've been misquoted many times regarding the whole 'freak folk' thing; five or six years ago, The New York Times ran something about me saying "It's cool—you have to call it something." In the interview, Banhart explained his thoughts about the label at length: "First, let me say that I don't know a single person that has ever been called any of the horrid freak-folk-isms, who has ever said, 'Yep! That's what we play! Freak folk!' [...] Today, I really don't care, I just don't want anyone to get the impression I had anything to do with that term or at any point adopted that label."

Banhart had already expressed similar sentiments in a July 2006 interview with Pitchfork:

It's so gross. I know my name is attached to it but it's such a creation of someone else that it's very difficult for me to pay it any attention. In interviews where they bring up the freak-folk thing or whatever, when forced to play that game, when I know someone is in that state of mind, I'll give them an alternative. So, I've said in the past we're like a family or "New" New Age because I'd rather the records be in the whale section instead of the "B" section or the "D" section. [...]

None of the other artists the label "freak folk" was applied to embraced the term either. Greg Weeks of Espers commented that "as soon as the labels got thrown out there, everything [got] jokey." In 2015, Andy Cabic of Vetiver told Billboard:

I think [the label 'freak folk'] can just die now. It doesn't really seem to be relevant and I don't think anyone is using that to any sort of degree. I don't know a single band that has embraced that thing; it's almost like a demarcation of a bad journalistic or critical moniker that didn't seem to hold up. I am friendly with a lot of the people they lumped me in with, but for the threads that musically defined us, there's not a lot [...].

James Jackson Toth of Wooden Wand and the Vanishing Voice echoed a similar sentiment in 2024:

I tend to resent being lumped in with a group of people who might happen to be friends, who might happen to be around the same age, and/or who might happen to have similar albums in their record collection. I don't hear a lot of commonalities beyond that. What does Vetiver have to do with Pocahaunted? What does Joanna Newsom have to do with Jackie-O Motherfucker? There were as many bands in my cohort influenced by Sun Ra as there were by Comus. The best ones took a little from both!

=== Interchangeability with other terms ===
In 2005, Pitchfork equated the term "freak folk" with "New Weird America". Writing for AllMusic, Richie Unterberger equated the term with "psych-folk" and "acid folk," stating: "psych-folk, freak-folk, acid folk (whatever you want to call it) has enjoyed a mild renaissance over the last decade or so." Writing for Perfect Sound Forever, musician and critic Kandia Crazy Horse, similarly equated the term to "psych-folk", alongside "nu Americana," "avant-folk" and "folktronica". In 2010, music magazine PopMatters made use of the term "freak-folk revival" in a review of musician Josephine Foster's Graphic As A Star (2009), while in 2024, music magazine American Songwriter stated "New Weird America is generally used to describe the 2000s American freak folk revival".

== Characteristics ==
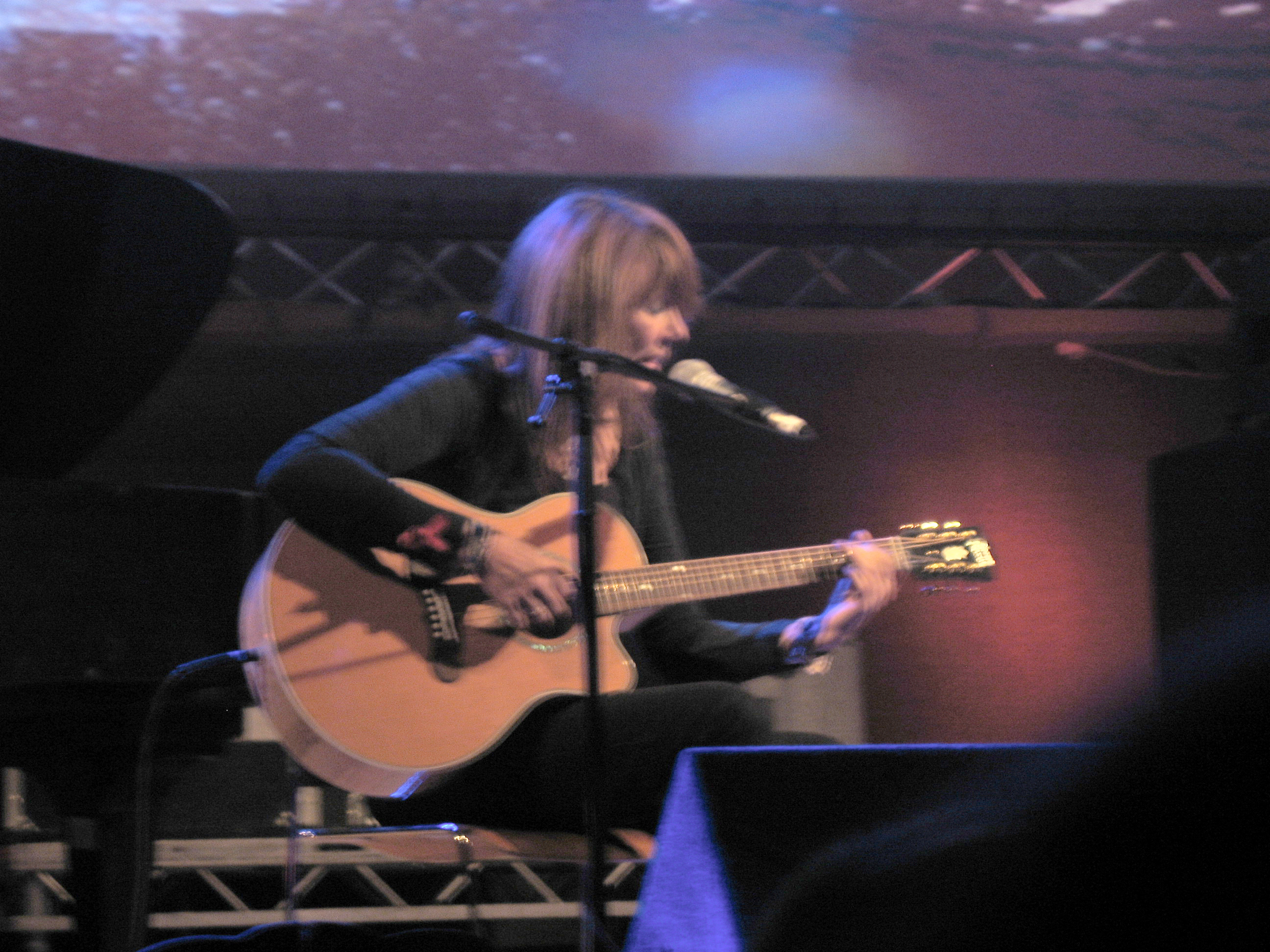
Vashti Bunyan was a touchstone for the 2000s freak folk scene

A 2004 New York Times feature on Devendra Banhart, entitled Freak Folk's Very Own Pied Piper, asserted that Banhart's music belonged to a style "described as avant-folk or freak-folk". It profiled Banhart as the most prominent of a group of artists which also included Joanna Newsom, Animal Collective, and Adem, and characterized their music as "quiet, soothing and childlike" and their lyrics as "fantastic, surreal and free of the slightest trace of irony". It noted British singer-songwriter Vashti Bunyan as having "become a touchstone, collaborating with both Mr. Banhart and Animal Collective".

Another New York Times feature, Summer of Love Redux from June 2006, proclaimed "this summer's version of freak folk tends to be darker and more experimental than first-wavers like Mr. Banhart and Ms. Newsom," referencing guitarist Ben Chasny of Six Organs of Admittance, Current 93, and Comets on Fire. Writing retrospectively in 2021, Pitchfork's Brian Howe commented on Chasny's inclusion under the freak folk umbrella:

There was exactly one moment when it was possible to briefly state the kind of music that Ben Chasny makes. It was in 2005, when his uncharacteristic singer-songwriter album School of the Flower caused his seven-year-old experimental project, Six Organs of Admittance, to be linked with the acoustic psych-pop fad known as New Weird America or, somehow even more embarrassingly, freak-folk. But the former term was a particularly odd fit for him. Like the guitarist Jack Rose, Chasny's acoustic fingerpicking looked beyond folk idioms and toward influences like the Indian raga, which he fused with drone music. This wasn't stuff you'd sing around a campfire, and even Chasny's least hermetic tunes felt distinct from the ersatz standards, sea shanties, and court songs that became associated with freak-folk.

In a 2006 review of Espers' II, Pitchfork's Amanda Petrusich asserted that "freak-folk tends to eschew any clear genre parameters" and that its participants at the time (including Espers, Devendra Banhart, Joanna Newsom, Animal Collective, Faun Fables, and "a mess of other psych- and folk-infused players") were united by an affinity for ancient British folk tradition, as well as late 1960s and early 1970s folk rock acts such as Vashti Bunyan, the Incredible String Band, Comus, Fairport Convention, Shirley Collins, Pentangle, and Strawbs. She characterized the genre as featuring "hippie-gone-Renaissance Faire overtones," though emphasizing that Espers' music is "vaguely menacing" and "smarter, sharper, and more relentlessly compelling than their trappings might suggest".

In 2013, Chicago Reader stated, "Freak folk is freakish not because it channels the chthonic creepiness of the old folk, but because it embraces our current hipster creepiness—the up-to-date chill of the new weird America."

According to music magazine American Songwriter, freak folk "blends the hippie sensibilities of straight folk—pastoral images, free love, and primarily acoustic instrumentation—with the psychedelia and experimentation of its main genre."

== History ==
=== Influences and progenitors ===
==== Pre-1960s ====
In a February 2007 article, writing for Perfect Sound Forever, Kandia Crazy Horse noted freak folk's "outlaw trappings and apostate nature" as being predated by figures such as Welsh painter Augustus John and his muse Dorelia's ménage, English occultist Aleister Crowley's Thelema cult and 19th century French Romantics.

In 2008, Peter Stampfel of the Holy Modal Rounders wrote an article on freak folk for issue 10 of the Michael Hurley fanzine Blue Navigator which was published in April 2009. The article aimed to chronologize the pre-1960s "ancestors" of freak folk. It was later shortened and re-published in the online music magazine Perfect Sound Forever in December 2009, Stampfel stated:

I first heard the phrase 'freak folk' a couple of years ago. Then I heard that something similar in the UK was called 'old weird,' echoing Greil Marcus' phrase describing the very American music from the Harry Smith Anthology. Of course, the UK has old weird too. Old weird is everywhere. Always has been. All the stuff I read about old weird/freak folk [...] sounded interesting, but what annoyed me were the discussions of its origins. Only one author mentioned Michael Hurley, and no one mentioned the Holy Modal Rounders. The articles all said OWFF was started by a bunch of people who came along years after Hurley and the Rounders first recorded. You can trace freak folk back directly to the first albums of the Holy Modal Rounders and Michael Hurley, recorded in 1963 and 1964 (or '65), respectively. Three songs stand out as landmarks to the genre: the Rounders' 'Euphoria,' which was written by Robin Remailly while he was chopping a tree, and two songs on Hurley's first album, 'The Tea Song,' and 'Intersoular Blues,' aka "Radar Blues".

==== 1960s–1970s ====
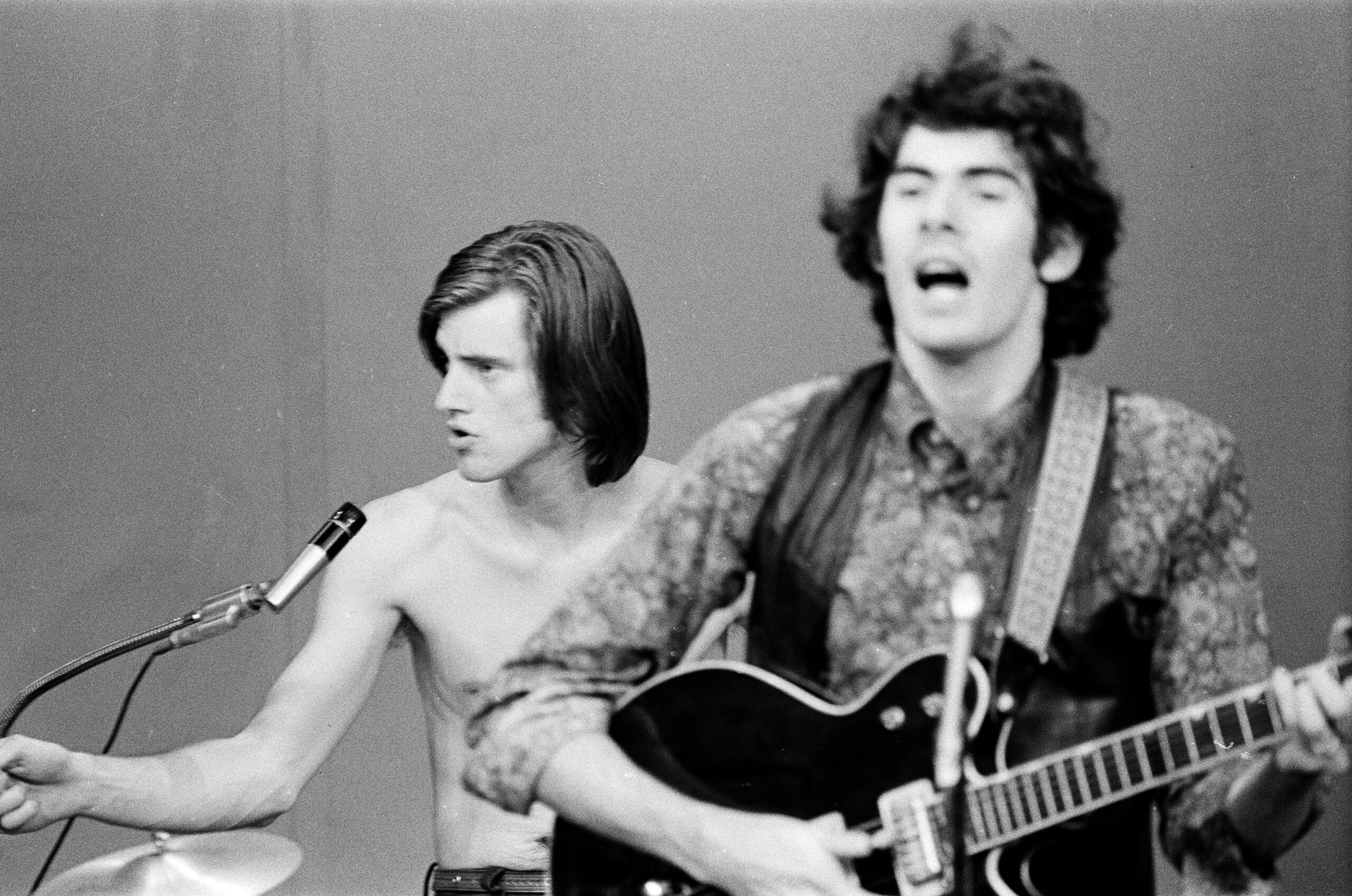
The Holy Modal Rounders have been noted as precursors to freak folk. Pictured in 1968; Sam Shepard (left) and Steve Weber

New York folk artists who emerged in the 1960s such as the Holy Modal Rounders, Michael Hurley, the Fugs and Godz would retrospectively be referred to as freak folk. In 1999, music critic Robert Christgau reviewed the reissue 1 & 2, which combined the Holy Modal Rounders' first two albums, declaring that "freak folk started here". Lead singer Peter Stampfel has been described as a "freak-folk legend". Similarly, writing for Perfect Sound Forever, Kandia Crazy Horse referred to guitarist John Fahey as a "freak-folk icon" and stated the "freak-folk elite" labeled Nick Drake "a saint", while treating Vashti Bunyan as "Holy Mater". Additionally, Michael Hurley has been labelled "the Godfather of Freak Folk". While David Crosby's 1971 album If I Could Only Remember My Name has been described by some as an early progenitor of the genre.

Pitchfork staffer Amanda Petrusich characterized late 1960s and early 1970s acts such as Vashti Bunyan, the Incredible String Band, Comus, Fairport Convention, Shirley Collins, Pentangle, and Strawbs as "routinely pilfer[ed] from" by 2000s freak folk artists like Devendra Banhart, Joanna Newsom, and Espers.

Writing retrospectively in 2025, British music monthly Mojo wrote of the 1960s British psychedelic folk duo Tyrannosaurus Rex (later the popular glam rock outfit T. Rex) that "in recent years, [they] have [...] been unmasked as freak-folk pioneers"; American weekly Billboard likewise characterized the duo as a "psychedelic freak-folk outfit". Pitchfork's characterization of Tyrannosaurus Rex's Marc Bolan was that he "switched from Tolkien-esque freak folk to Chuck Berry boogie in the span of an album." In Shock and Awe: Glam Rock and Its Legacy (2016), British music critic Simon Reynolds noted that "[Tyrannosaurus Rex's] records would have remained among the least influential of all time if they hadn't been belatedly seized upon by Animal Collective and other freak-folk artists of the noughties."

Vashti Bunyan was an influence on freak folk; in turn, the popularity of the genre helped revive her career. She has been referred to as the "patron saint" of the 2000s freak folk scene and "the godmother of freak folk".

A 2014 feature by British music magazine FACT, entitled The 100 best albums of the 1970s, named British progressive folk group Comus' 1971 debut First Utterance as "the square root of the mid-2000s freak-folk explosion." In 2024, James Jackson Toth of freak folk band Wooden Wand and the Vanishing Voice, reflecting on the 2000s popularity of the genre, told Stereogum: "There were as many bands in my cohort influenced by Sun Ra as there were by Comus. The best ones took a little from both!"

In 2024, music magazine American Songwriter, stated: "freak folk emerged in the 1970s as a subgenre of psychedelic folk, but later took off in the 1990s with a resurgence in the 2000s."

=== 2000s: Popularity ===
On April 1, 2004, American magazine Arthur's Bastet imprint released the Devendra Banhart-compiled various artists album The Golden Apples of the Sun. It featured Banhart, Vetiver, Joanna Newsom, Six Organs of Admittance, Josephine Foster, Espers, Vashti Bunyan, Jana Hunter, Currituck Co., White Magic, Iron & Wine, Diane Cluck, Matt Valentine, Entrance, Jack Rose, Little Wings, Scout Niblett, Troll, CocoRosie, and Anohni. According to Pitchfork, the compilation "assisted greatly" in defining the term "freak folk", while Stereogum notes the aftermath of its release as "the moment when a descriptive phrase solidified into a genre". At the time, Pitchfork described the album as "a kind of now-sound capsule of the contemporary neo-folk scene" and the featured artists as "20 diverse freakfolk acts to serve as representatives of the various facets of the underground's most recent (and most promising) pigeonhole." Pitchfork's review concluded:

[...] Golden Apples of the Sun's sprawling landscape presents a persuasive case for the depth of a scene that seemingly sprung up (like mushrooms) overnight. It's impossible to pick apart intentions, but this music feels far more sincere than other recent buzzes, and even if these artists are pulling the wool over our eyes (which seems unlikely), it would appear that perhaps a few of these players will outlast the current critical harvesting.

On December 12, 2004, The New York Times published an article entitled Freak Folk's Very Own Pied Piper, a profile of Devendra Banhart. It also mentioned Joanna Newsom, Animal Collective, and Adem, framing the artists as part of a group, and part of a new genre. According to Stereogum, by 2005 the term "freak folk" had already become oversaturated. In a 2020 review of Josephine Foster's No Harm Done, Steve Krakow of Chicago Reader retrospectively summarised the popularity of freak folk as follows:

Back in ye olde early aughts, 'freak folk' ruled the land. Championed and perhaps encouraged by photogenic weirdo Devendra Banhart, artists influenced by elegiac or subliminally psychedelic folk acts from the 60s and 70s—Tyrannosaurus Rex, the Incredible String Band, Michael Hurley—started coming out of the woodwork. For a hot strange minute, indie record bins were dominated by worshipers of UK folk (Espers, Nick Castro & the Young Elders), delicate and idiosyncratic singers (Joanna Newsom, Scout Niblett), and sublimely earthy fingerpicking guitarists (Jack Rose, James Blackshaw).

In September 2005, Pitchfork labeled Devendra Banhart's track "A Sight to Behold" from his debut album Rejoicing in the Hands as "the singer connecting his idiosyncratic vision—in 2004, positioned at the most popular edge of the freak-folk scene".

In May 2006, Spin magazine published "The Definitive Guide to Freak Folk", which cited Harry Everett Smith's 1952 Anthology of American Folk Music, Pearls Before Swine, the Incredible String Band, John Fahey, Vashti Bunyan, Jandek, Joanna Newsom, Animal Collective, Devendra Banhart, and Sufjan Stevens as examples of the genre.

In 2006, Pitchfork interviewed Current 93's David Tibet, they asked him "Speaking of your connection to younger musicians: In your Durtro updates you've championed Six Organs, Will Oldham, and Joanna Newsom. How did you first get connected to freak folk and the doom and psych stuff? You and Ben [Chasny] seem to have an especially strong alliance." In 2015, Pitchfork referred to Tibet as a "freak-folk impresario".

In a 2010 review of Kemialliset Ystävät's Ullakkopalo, Pitchfork described Finnish independent label Fonal Records, who released the album, as "a leading label in the psych and freak folk worlds".

In 2011, Simon Reynolds acknowledged a recent resurgence of interest in folk music, exemplified by "the Folk Britannia festival/documentary series, the glut of compilations of vintage 'wyrd folk', and the network of contemporary troubadours and minstrels known as 'freak folk.'" According to Reynolds, the revival was centered specifically around "UK folk of the most esoteric sort (Vashti Bunyan, Comus, Forest)." He contrasted it with an earlier revival in the mid-1980s, which had instead emphasized American roots music and had no relation to anything "mushroom-munching trippy or mystical."

== Criticism ==
In 2005, writer Rob Harvilla of the East Bay Express published an article regarding music magazine The Believer's focus on white dominated music, stating "The Believer's musical tastes have drawn the ire of antirockist types Internetwide. Is liking Joanna Newsom so wrong?". In the article, Harvilla cites The Believer's magazine as herding "indie-rock sacred cows like the Mountain Goats, Spoon, and the Shins — as narrow, freak-folk-centric, and (cover your ears, children) rockist."

In February 2007, Perfect Sound Forever published two articles on freak folk by musician and music critic Kandia Crazy Horse, entitled "Race, rock, and the New Weird America". Both articles stated that artists such as Devendra Banhart were alongside "many of his freaky, cackle-voiced fellow travelers flit in and out of the Yay Area seemingly impervious to the parallel hyphy cultural revolution that's extended its reach from San Francisco across the nation". The article asserted that the freak-folk scene was predominantly white dominated, adding "A siege mentality is causing young white freak-folk stars to erect a sonic preserve fit to buttress against the pop centrality of such colored genres as dirty South hip-hop, hyphy and reggaeton."

Horse makes mention of a Pitchfork review by Brandon Stousy, regarding Devendra Banhart's album Cripple Crow (2005). The review briefly discussed Banhart's use of Native American imagery in the cover art, which Banhart replied "68% of the people on the cover have Native American blood." Horse follows this statement by referencing musician Karen Dalton's influence on Banhart's music, as Dalton was herself Cherokee and stating "Doubtless, the New Weird America scene will prove as inhospitable to any brilliant young colored aesthete who challenges them in their own day-glo arena".

Additionally, Horse referenced Harvilla's article in the East Bay Express stating:

Rob Harvilla questioned the critical interest in freak-folk and related movements, conceding, 'it's a niche. An indie-rock niche. Yes, a predominantly white niche. But does that make it inherently evil? Rockist? Racist?' Certainly, the music of Newsom and Banhart is elaborate, personal mythology derived from the sense that the individual counts above the communal for all that Banhart refers to his musical friends as "The Family" -- which makes the work (whatever its purely sonic merit) no different than Star Wars and certainly inherently western, fit for a mass white audience who has voted Tolkien's opus the greatest book(s) of the 20th century in several forums.

Horse further stated:

If the material benefits of being white have decreased drastically in the last 25 years, the psychological benefits remain potent. Hence must be the lure of freak-folk as a subculture and "Whites Only Party" – which makes these artists as dangerous, if not more so, as another of the year's media sensations: the white supremacist sister act Dresden Blue. Obviously, there's a fine line that separates Dresden Blue's preservation of Northern European values in song and, say, Joanna Newsom's – and the line's rendered a tightrope by audience, venue and intent. Although none of these NWA [New Weird America] acts don the equivalent of minstrelsy's burnt cork blackface (yet what are we to make of the men's flagrant, flamboyant hirsutism?), the cool pose of their anachronistic identities, misty mountain hops, tribal markings and peasant garb is still alienating.

== Legacy ==
In her 2008 book It Still Moves, Pitchfork staffer Amanda Petrusich commented on the evolution of freak folk and related terms, stating that "the umbrella of 'New Weird America' [...] flowed into the slightly more descriptive 'free-folk,' which became 'freak-folk,' and subsequently devolved, as more and more diverse artists were swept up in the wave, into the catchall 'indie-folk'." At the same time, she remarked that "the differences between psych-infused free-folk like MV & EE and acoustic indie-folk like Iron and Wine generally seem profound enough to warrant at least two distinct, hyphenated prefixes." Directly referencing Petrusich, a 2024 Stereogum article by Eric Harvey described the transition from freak folk to indie folk in more detail, tying it to the "mainstreaming of twee-folk signifiers":

Just a couple years after Devendra Banhart and Joanna Newsom emerged came M. Ward and Zooey Deschanel, amid a mid-2000s glut of childlike, whimsical, earnest, acoustic Starbucks-friendly music like Feist, the Decemberists, Regina Spektor, and Jose Gonzalez. The kinds of artisanal, childilke artwork that decorated Banhart and Newsom's albums became part of the Etsy gig economy. Everyone, including tech startups, was putting a bird on it, and every TV ad had an adorkable ukulele soundtrack. If you want to locate the moment when post-Strokes independent music was gentrified, Iron & Wine covering 'Such Great Heights' to hawk M&M's is a good place to start.

In the article, Harvey also reflected that regardless of the artists themselves' distaste for it, the term "freak folk" helped carve out a "significant space for a lot of music to gain notice it wouldn't otherwise have"; in this regard, he compared it to grunge, a label rejected by some artists which nonetheless helped sell the music. He cited Edward Sharpe and the Magnetic Zeros as an example of a band that owed its existence to the popularity of freak folk.

In 2026, Peter Stampfel of the Holy Modal Rounders reflected on an article on freak folk he had originally written for the Michael Hurley fanzine Blue Navigator in 2008, stating:

I'm sure it's the best piece on the subject ever written. I'd love to be proven wrong. Other thing—back in the aughties, Eli Smith and I—forgot who else came with—Walker Shepard?—were invited to a Harry Smith festival in Milford, PA. For a couple days, everyone played songs from the Anthology. With one or two exceptions, everyone's take on every tune was twisted, bent, and/or freaky in some way or other. My take was that freak folk had become the default setting. And that was almost 20 years ago.

== See also ==
- Singer-songwriter
- Anti-folk
- Counterculture of the 1960s
- Freak-out (slang)
- Neofolk

== Bibliography ==
- Bemis, Alec Hanley (2004-12-12). "Freak Folk's Very Own Pied Piper". The New York Times.
- Leech, Jeanette (2010). Seasons They Change: The Story of Acid and Psychedelic Folk. London: Jawbone Press. ISBN 978-1-906002-32-9.
