= Meg Baird =

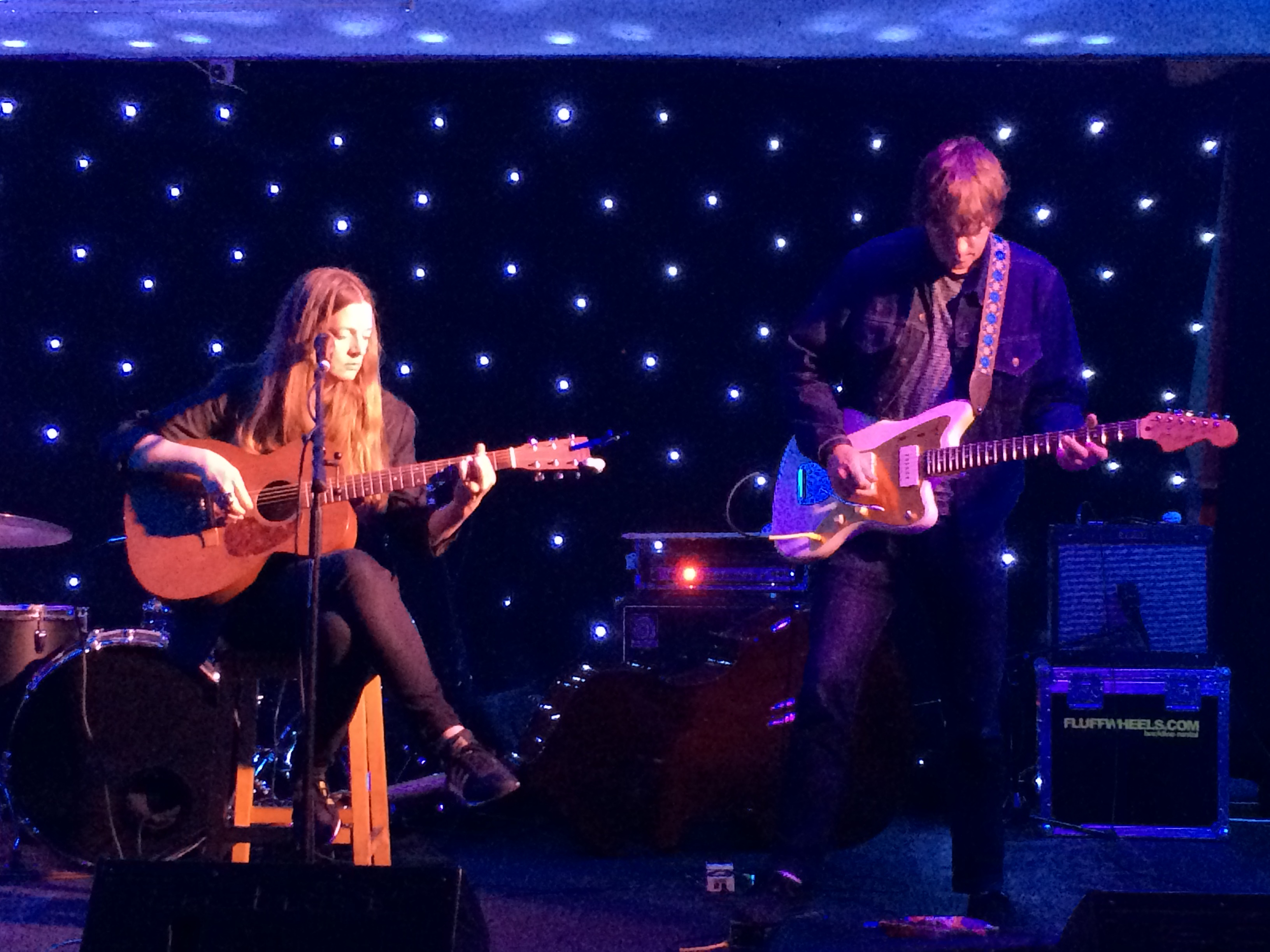
- Meg Baird (left), performing at Brudenell Social Club, 2015

Background information
- Genres: Folk
- Instruments: Guitar; mountain dulcimer; piano; drums
- Labels: Tequila Sunrise; Drag City; Bo'Weavil; Wichita Recordings; P-Vine; Matador; Thrill Jockey
- Formerly of: Espers; The Baird Sisters
- Website: Official website

Meg Baird is an American musician based in San Francisco, California, United States, who, in addition to her solo career, is known as a founding member, lead vocalist, and drummer for Heron Oblivion, along with members from Assemble Head in Sunburst Sound and Comets on Fire. She was also a guitarist and the lead female vocalist in Philadelphia psychedelic folk rock band Espers, and played drums in Philadelphia punk band Watery Love. Baird frequently collaborates with the Los Angeles-based harpist Mary Lattimore.

== Early life ==
Originally from New Jersey, United States, Baird's family history is based in the folk tradition: Baird is the great-great niece of Isaac Garfield "I.G." Greer, a historian and Appalachian folk singer born in 1881. His inclusion on one of the earliest albums issued by the Archive of Folk Culture in the Library of Congress helped expose Baird to folk music at a young age, while she was taking piano lessons, teaching herself guitar, and listening to Smithsonian Folkways albums.

== Music ==
While a member of Espers In 2007, Baird released her first solo album, Dear Companion, on the Drag City record label. Baird's second solo album, Seasons on Earth, was released in 2011 and received favorable reviews from The Wire, Allmusic, Spin and NPR. This was followed by Don't Weigh Down the Light in 2015, described as "post-folk" by The New York Times.

== Bands and collaborations ==
Baird was a founding member of the Philadelphia psychedelic folk group Espers, whose first album was released by Time-Lag Records in 2003.

In 2014, Baird joined Heron Oblivion as lead vocalist and drummer. The supergroup includes Charles Saufley, Noel Van Harmonson (Comets on Fire), and Ethan Miller (Howlin Rain, Comets on Fire).

She also plays with sister Laura in The Baird Sisters and have released three albums between 2003 and 2011. In 2013, the Baird Sisters joined Glenn Jones on My Garden State.

Between 2009 and 2012, Baird played drums for Philadelphia punk band Watery Love.

In 2018, Baird and Mary Lattimore released their album Ghost Forests to critical acclaim, reaching the number three position on Billboard's new age chart.

== Touring ==
As a solo artist, she has toured with many noted fingerstyle guitarists, including Bert Jansch, James Blackshaw, Micah Blue Smaldone, Michael Chapman, Glenn Jones, Michael Hurley, and Jack Rose. In February 2016 Baird served as the support act to Ryley Walker and Danny Thompson on an extensive tour of the United Kingdom. In 2019, Baird and Mary Lattimore toured extensively in support of their album Ghost Forests.

== Style and influences ==
Evoking Appalachian and Anglo-American folk ballads, Baird's vocal style has been compared to members of the UK folk-rock scene, including Celia Humpris of Trees, Fairport Convention's Sandy Denny, and Pentangle's Jacqui McShee.

== Discography ==
=== Meg Baird ===
- Waltze of the Tennis Players/Dear Companion (A Capella Version) 7-inch (Tequila Sunrise, 2006)
- Dear Companion (Drag City/Wichita/P-Vine, 2007)
- Seasons on Earth (Drag City, 2011)
- Don't Weigh Down the Light (Drag City, 2015)
- Furling (Drag City, 2023)

=== Meg Baird & Mary Lattimore ===
- Fair Annie 7-inch split with Sarah Silverman - 7-Inches for Planned Parenthood 10×7″ box set (2017)
- Ghost Forests CD/LP (2018) (Three Lobed)

=== Heron Oblivion ===
- Heron Oblivion CD/LP (2016) (Sub Pop)

=== Espers ===
- Espers (2004) (Time-Lag)
- The Weed Tree (2005) (Locust Music)
- II (2006) (Drag City)
- III (2009) (Drag City)

=== The Baird Sisters ===
- At Home CD-R (2003) (self-released)
- Lonely Town CD (2008) (self-released)
- Until You Find Your Green LP, ed. 300 (2012) (Grapefruit)
- Glenn Jones / The Baird Sisters My Garden State CD/LP (2013) (Thrill Jockey)

=== Collaborations and backing vocals ===
- Meg Baird, Helena Espvall, Sharron Kraus, Leaves from Off the Tree CD/LP (2006) (Bo'Weavil)
- Bonnie 'Prince' Billy - Ask Forgiveness CD/EP (2007) (Drag City)
- Sharon Van Etten - Epic CD/LP (2010) (Ba Da Bing!)
- Kurt Vile - Smoke Ring for My Halo CD/LP (2011) (Matador)
- Kurt Vile - Singles Going Home Alone#6 split 7-inch (2011) (Matador)

=== Watery Love ===
- Debut 45 7-inch (2009) (Richie)
- Two Thrills 7-inch (2011) (Negative Guest List/Little Big Chief)
- Die With Dignity 7-inch (2012) (Siltbreeze)

=== Compilations ===
- So Much Fire to Roast Human Flesh CD (2006) (Bastet)
- Loving Takes This Course: A Tribute to the Songs of Kath Bloom CD (2009) (Chapter Music)
- Meet the Philly Elite (with Jack Rose, Kurt Vile, and US Girls) 7-inch (2009) (Kraak)
- We are all one, In the Sun: A tribute to Robbie Basho CD/LP (2010) (Important Records)
- Shirley Inspired CD/LP (2015) (Earth Records)
