= Dear Companion =

Studio album by Meg Baird
- Released: May 22, 2007
- Genre: Folk music
- Label: Drag City/Wichita/P-Vine

Meg Baird chronology
Dear Companion (2007)	Seasons on Earth (2011)

Professional ratings
Review scores
Source	Rating
The Philadelphia Inquirer	3/4 stars
Pitchfork Media	(7.8/10)
Allmusic	3.5/5 stars
Popmatters	(7/10)
Drowned in Sound	(8/10)
Dusted Magazine	(positive)
Uncut (magazine)	(positive)
Foxy Digitalis	10/10 stars

Dear Companion is Espers vocalist Meg Baird's first solo album. It was released in 2007 to critical praise. The album contains three traditional folk songs, four covers of more recent songs, and two original songs written by Baird. The album is lightly orchestrated traditional folk music, without Espers' psychedelic and prog influences, dense orchestration, and dark atmosphere. Dear Companion was recorded at the same time as the Espers album II, at Baird's home in Philadelphia. Two of the traditional songs ("Willie o Winsbury" and "Barbry Ellen") also appeared on Leaves From Off the Tree, an album by Baird, Espers bandmate Helena Espvall, and Sharron Kraus that came out the year before. Two versions of the title song open and close the album, the second one a cappella.

== Track listing ==
1. "Dear Companion" (Traditional) – 3:44
2. "River Song" by Chris Thompson (http://www.expdev.net/htownwiki/index.php/Chris_Thompson) 2:31
3. "The Cruelty of Barbary Ellen" (Traditional)– 6:26
4. "Do What You Gotta Do" (Jimmy Webb)– 2:48
5. "Riverhouse in Tinicum" (Original) – 4:01
6. "The Waltze of the Tennis Players" (Fraser & DeBolt)– 3:05
7. "Maiden in the Moor Lay" (Original) – 2:26
8. "Sweet William and Fair Ellen"(Traditional) – 5:13
9. "All I Ever Wanted" (New Riders of the Purple Sage)– 3:20
10. "Willie O' Winsbury" (Traditional) – 6:09
11. "Dear Companion" – 2:27
