= Sumer Is Icumen In: The Pagan Sound of British and Irish Folk 1966–75 =

2020 compilation album

Compilation album by Various artists
- Released: 27 November 2020
- Genre: British folk rock; psychedelic folk
- Length: 3:55:10
- Label: Grapefruit Records

Sumer Is Icumen In: The Pagan Sound of British and Irish Folk 1966–75 is a 2020 compilation album released by Grapefruit Records, an imprint label of Cherry Red Records. It consists of British folk revival music influenced by the counterculture of the 1960s; the song material has a focus on eerie and mystical elements.

== Background ==
In 2015, Grapefruit Records, an imprint label of Cherry Red Records, released the 3-CD compilation album Dust on the Nettles: A Journey Through the British Underground Folk Scene 1967–72. It had a focus on the meeting between the British folk revival and the counterculture of the 1960s. It was followed by Sumer Is Icumen In: The Pagan Sound of British and Irish Folk 1966–75, which differs from its predecessor by having a stronger focus on spiritual and eerie elements.

== Reception ==
Grapefruit Records released Sumer Is Icumen In on 27 November 2020. Multiple critics wrote that the album contains tracks from both famous and obscure acts. AllMusic's Timothy Monger said the mystical elements are best represented by less famous acts such as Oberon, Meic Stevens and Jan Dukes de Grey. Aspects of progressive folk, according to Monger, are best represented by Comus, Dr. Strangely Strange and Third Ear Band, and more traditional approaches by Archie Fisher and Anne Briggs. Monger named Briggs' previously unreleased "Summer's In" as a standout track, gave the album a rating of four and a half out of five and he called the material "quite magical and still captivating a half-century later". David Honigmann of the Financial Times wrote that the music on Sumer Is Icumen In is rooted in the eerie and uncanny aspects of traditional song material which makes it distinct from New Age culture. He rated the album four out of five and called it "a wintry collection, melodic and strangely strange".

Several critics mentioned the 1973 film The Wicker Man as a cultural reference point; track number two, "Corn Rigs" performed by Magnet, comes from that film. For The Arts Desk, Kieron Tyler wrote that Sumer Is Icumen In has a "pick-'n-mix approach to the pagan", comparing it to The Wicker Man in that regard, in which atmosphere is at the centre. He highlighted the tracks from Fairport Convention, The Incredible String Band, Comus and Amber, and although he described some tracks as weak, he wrote that the album is "stuffed with gems". Jack Hopkin of It's Psychedelic Baby! Magazine wrote that Sumer Is Icumen In is more coherent than Dust on the Nettless and thought it was an improvement to include Irish acts such as Dr. Strangely Strange. He said the selection can be enjoyed by "both the casual fan and serious archivist" and the album should appeal to fans of freak-folk.

== Track listing ==
Disc 1: Upon a Lammas Night
No.	Title	Artist	Length
1.	"Lark Rise"	Third Ear Band
2.	"Corn Rigs"	Magnet
3.	"John Barleycorn"	Traffic
4.	"Sanctuary Stone"	Midwinter
5.	"The Keys of Canterbury"	Vulcan's Hammer
6.	"The Wood-Gathering Man"	The Celebrated Ratliffe Stout Band
7.	"Twa Corbies"	Steeleye Span
8.	"Lovely Joan"	Folkal Point
9.	"Canon Dale (Alternative Version)"	Strawbs
10.	"White Horse"	Kevin Coyne
11.	"Yorric"	Meic Stevens
12.	"Lyke Wake Dirge"	The Young Tradition
13.	"Swan in the Evening"	Amber
14.	"Minerva"	Synanthesia
15.	"The Parting Glass"	The Minor Birds
16.	"Virgin Childe"	Parameter
17.	"The Sapphire"	Carolanne Pegg
18.	"Cabin on the Clifftop"	Dry Heart
19.	"Winter Passes"	Mighty Baby
20.	"On Horseback"	Mike Oldfield

Disc 2: Book of Shadows
No.	Title	Artist	Length
1.	"Tam Lin"	Fairport Convention
2.	"Let No Man Steal Your Thyme"	Gallery
3.	"False Knight on the Road"	Tim Hart and Maddy Prior
4.	"The Scarecrow (Demo Version)"	Lal Waterson
5.	"Silver Man"	Chimera
6.	"The White Hare"	Shirley Collins and The Albion Country Band
7.	"Mad Tom of Bedlam"	Horden Raikes
8.	"The Song of the Healer"	The Sallyangie
9.	"Lizard-Long-Tonque-Boy (Alternative Version)"	Bridget St John
10.	"Strings in the Earth and Air"	Dr. Strangely Strange
11.	"Sorcerers"	Jan Dukes de Grey
12.	"Green Grass"	Dave and Toni Arthur
13.	"Where's Your Master Gone?"	Simon Finn
14.	"Nottamun Town"	Oberon
15.	"The House Carpenter"	Fresh Maggots
16.	"Hand in Hand"	J. P. Sunshine
17.	"The Bite"	Comus
18.	"Death"	The Sun Also Rises
19.	"Winter"	Tea and Symphony
20.	"Autumn Lady Dancing Song"	Principal Edwards Magic Theatre
21.	"Summer's In"	Anne Briggs

Disc 3: Hearken to the Witch's Rune
No.	Title	Artist	Length
1.	"The Bells of Dunwich"	Stone Angel
2.	"Cruel Sister"	Pentangle
3.	"Witches Hat"	The Incredible String Band
4.	"Reynerdine"	Archie Fisher
5.	"The Poet and the Witch"	Mellow Candle
6.	"Elfin Boy"	Curved Air
7.	"Pretty Polly"	Sweeney's Men
8.	"Three Ravens"	Parke
9.	"Salisbury Plain"	Green Man
10.	"Flodden Field"	Spriguns of Tolgus
11.	"Geordie"	The MacDonald Folk Group
12.	"The Queen of the Night"	Michael Raven and Joan Mills
13.	"Holsworthy Peter's Fair"	George Deacon and Marion Ross
14.	"Captain Wedderburn's Courtship"	Staverton Bridge
15.	"Butterfly on the Shore"	Shirley Kent
16.	"Eastern Spell"	Marc Bolan
17.	"The Lark in the Morning"	Heather, Adrian and John
18.	"Scarborough Fair"	The Coterie
19.	"Mendle"	Mr. Fox
20.	"Sumer Is A-Cumin In" (bonus track: not listed on box)	Choir Unnamed
Total length:			3:55:10

== See also ==
- Sumer is icumen in
