= The Story (British band) =

English psychedelic folk duo

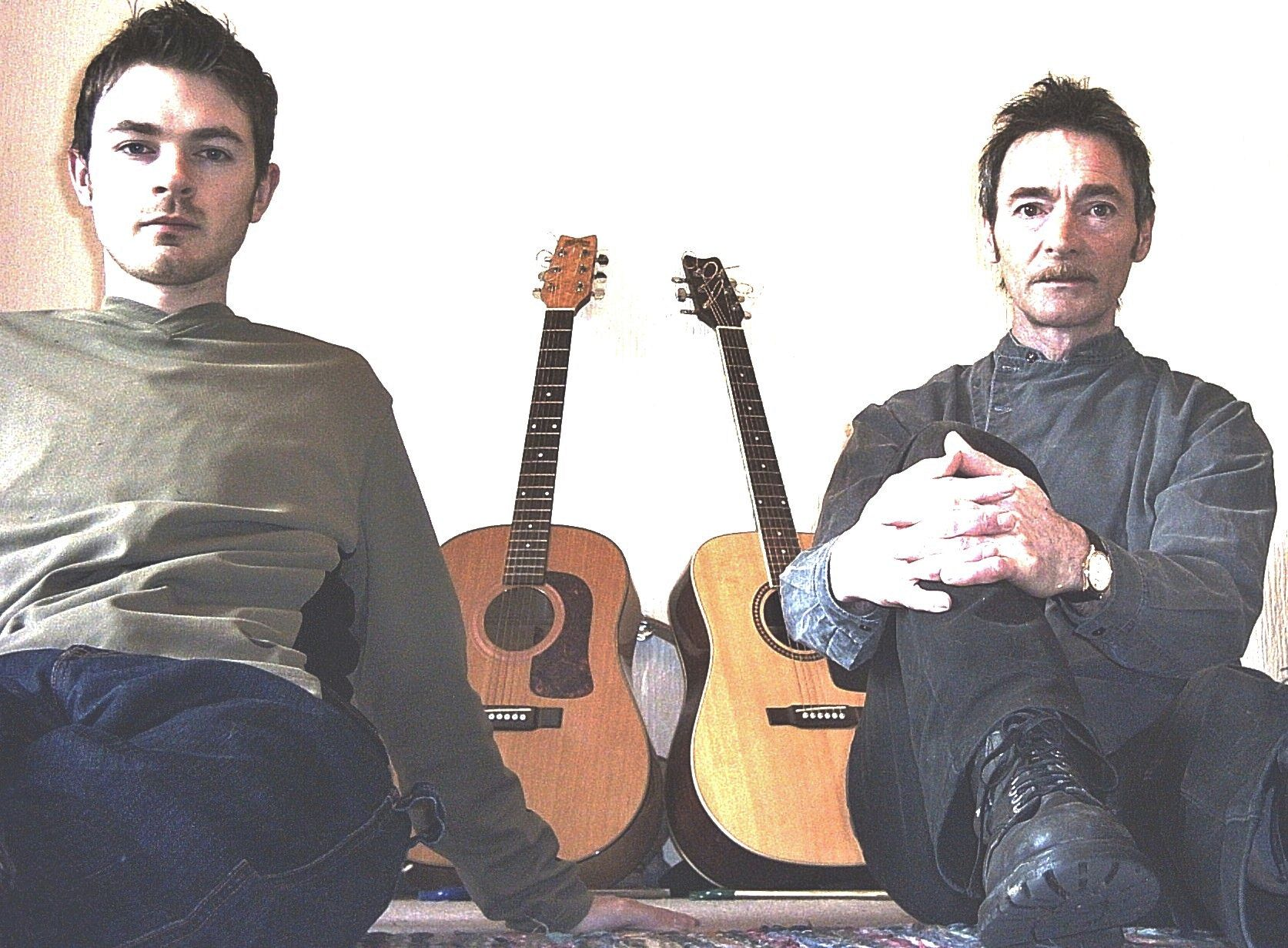
- Tom & Martin Welham

Background information
- Origin: United Kingdom
- Genres: Psychedelic folk, psychedelic pop, progressive folk, psychedelic rock, acoustic, folk rock
- Years active: 2002– present
- Labels: Good Village, Sunbeam, Cold Spring, Rainbow Quartz
- Members: Martin Welham; Tom Welham
- Website: thestoryuk.weebly.com

The Story is an English psychedelic folk duo comprising the former Forest member Martin Welham and his son Tom Welham. They write and record melodic songs that range from psychedelic pop to stream-of-consciousness folk and play an array of predominantly acoustic instruments as a backdrop to their blend of vocal harmonies.

== Biography ==
Martin Welham was part of the influential 1960s acid folk trio Forest. In the early 2000s, thirty years after Forest disbanded, he formed the Somerset based band The Story with his son Tom and returned to recording music. Their sound has echoes of Martin's earlier work with authentic psychedelic songwriting at its core.

The band's first release was a 2005 vinyl split album, The Dawn Is Crowned, with Californian freak folk band Whysp on Good Village Records. The Story's side has five broadly acoustic tracks that blend esoteric, dark imagery with powerful vocal harmonies resulting in an unattributable psychedelic air.

In 2006, the band released its first full-length album, Tale Spin, on Sunbeam Records, the first contemporary artists released by the label. This psychedelic folk album features acoustic guitars, keyboards and light percussion combined with airy harmony vocals and wistful melodies.

A follow-up album, Arcane Rising, was released in 2007. A stream of consciousness conceptual song cycle, the album is made up of improvised melodies and acoustic guitar backings augmented by flutes, melody harp, harmonica and hand percussion. Lyrically, the album celebrates life and nature through the changing seasons while questioning religious doctrines and humankind's ecological footprint. Also in 2007, The Story's sinister track "The Wicker Man" appeared on the dark folk compilation album John Barleycorn Reborn on Cold Spring Records.

The band's acclaimed third full-length album, Joy Ride on Memory Lane, was released in 2011 by Rainbow Quartz Records under the band name The Story UK. This confident, hook-laden psychedelic album has a rockier sound than previous releases while continuing to incorporate the duo's warm harmonies and highly melodic aesthetic. Cold Spring Records' 2011 dark folk compilation album, John Barleycorn Reborn: Rebirth, included The Story's ritualistic celebration piece "All Hallow's Eve".

In 2018, the psychedelic folk rock release, The Dawn is Crowned with Opium Tears, brought together the first ever digital release of the band's 2005 vinyl LP, with five esoteric, darkly oblique, progressive psychedelic rock songs.

== Discography ==
=== Split album ===
The Dawn is Crowned

Studio album (split vinyl album) by The Story and Whysp
- Released: October 2005
- Genres: Psychedelic folk, acoustic
- Label: Good Village Recordings
- Producer: The Story

==== The Dawn Is Crowned ====
No.	Title	Writer(s)	Length
1.	"Beginning"	T. Welham	1:20
2.	"Floating Box"	M. Welham, T. Welham	4:17
3.	"Road to Ascension"	T. Welham, M. Welham	3:53
4.	"Emergency"	M. Welham	2:26
5.	"English Oak"	T. Welham	4:54
Total length:			16:06

=== Studio albums ===
Tale Spin

Studio album by The Story
- Released: 7 March 2006
- Genre: Psychedelic folk
- Length: 37:32
- Label: Sunbeam
- Producer: The Story

==== Tale Spin ====
No.	Title	Writer(s)	Length
1.	"The Story"	M. Welham	3:38
2.	"Hope and Pray"	T. Welham	2:51
3.	"Roll of the Dice"	T. Welham	1:33
4.	"Down to the Trees"	M. Welham, T. Welham	3:07
5.	"Windmills"	T. Welham	4:33
6.	"Walking the Wall"	M. Welham	3:21
7.	"Anyway"	T. Welham	3:05
8.	"Strange World"	T. Welham	2:43
9.	"Winterborn"	M. Welham	4:24
10.	"All Around Me"	T. Welham	3:34
11.	"Between the Lines"	T. Welham, M. Welham	4:43
Total length:			37:32

Arcane Rising

Studio album by The Story
- Released: 6 November 2007
- Genres: Psychedelic folk, acoustic
- Length: 39:58
- Label: Sunbeam
- Producer: The Story

==== Arcane Rising ====
No.	Title	Writer(s)	Length
1.	"A Story to Tell"	T. Welham, M. Welham	1:15
2.	"Lingering"	M. Welham, T. Welham	2:46
3.	"Watch Out"	M. Welham, T. Welham	2:42
4.	"You Caught Me Just in Time"	T. Welham, M. Welham	1:57
5.	"Winter Light"	M. Welham, T. Welham	2:21
6.	"The Darkened Path"	M. Welham, T. Welham	2:44
7.	"Slipstreams"	M. Welham, T. Welham	4:26
8.	"A Wheel Turns"	T. Welham, M. Welham	1:00
9.	"Awake Aware"	T. Welham, M. Welham	1:24
10.	"Away With It All"	T. Welham, M. Welham	1:42
11.	"The Fox"	M. Welham, T. Welham	1:54
12.	"Precious One"	T. Welham, M. Welham	4:43
13.	"Flash Across The Sky"	M. Welham, T. Welham	3:01
14.	"Dappled Stream"	T. Welham, M. Welham	3:00
15.	"A Course of Action"	T. Welham, M. Welham	3:47
16.	"Night Calls"	M. Welham, T. Welham	1:16
Total length:			39:58

Joy Ride on Memory Lane

Studio album by The Story UK
- Released: 11 September 2011
- Genres: Psychedelic pop, rock
- Length: 50:23
- Label: Rainbow Quartz
- Producer: The Story UK

==== Joy Ride on Memory Lane ====
No.	Title	Writer(s)	Length
1.	"Her Name Is Love"	T. Welham	4:02
2.	"Standing in the Rain""	T. Welham	3:55
3.	"For the Good of Your Soul"	M. Welham	4:41
4.	"Running Out of Time"	T. Welham	3:29
5.	"A Stone's Throw Away"	M. Welham, T. Welham	3:06
6.	"Roundabout"	T. Welham	5:17
7.	"Sixty Eight"	M. Welham	4:17
8.	"Andromeda"	M. Welham	4:32
9.	"She Doesn't Care"	M. Welham, T. Welham	3:53
10.	"Real World"	M. Welham	3:29
11.	"The Chase"	T. Welham, M. Welham	4:27
12.	"Magic Lantern"	T. Welham, M. Welham	5:15
Total length:			50:23

The Dawn is Crowned with Opium Tears

Studio album by The Story UK
- Released: 1 March 2018
- Genres: Psychedelic folk, psychedelic rock
- Length: 38:13
- Label: The Story UK
- Producer: The Story UK

==== The Dawn is Crowned with Opium Tears ====
No.	Title	Writer(s)	Length
1.	"Beginning"	T. Welham	1:27
2.	"Floating Box"	M. Welham, T. Welham	4:24
3.	"Road to Ascension"	T. Welham, M. Welham	4:02
4.	"Emergency"	M. Welham	2:27
5.	"English Oak"	T. Welham	4:22
6.	"The Moon, The Sun"	M. Welham, T. Welham	5:00
7.	"Wonderland"	T. Welham	4:41
8.	"Dawn Tourist"	M. Welham	4:13
9.	"The Wickerman"	M. Welham, T. Welham	2:30
10.	"Opium Tears"	M. Welham	5:07
Total length:			38:13

== Reception ==
Professional ratings
Review scores
Source	Rating
Dusted	Positive
The Unbroken Circle	Favorable

=== The Dawn Is Crowned ===
The Story's contribution to the split vinyl LP The Dawn Is Crowned was described by Doug Mosurak of Dusted as "panoptic in scope and fairly timeless, interjecting frills and fantasy elements into solid, warm musicianship", while The Unbroken Circle's Mark Coyle described the song "Road To Ascension" as "a masterpiece of any era" and the vocal harmonies as "incredible with an un-attributable psychedelic air".

Professional ratings
Review scores
Source	Rating
FoxyDigitalis	8/10 stars
Psychedelic Folk	Favourable

=== Tale Spin ===
Jeff Penczak of Foxy Digitalis described Tale Spin as "a whistful collection of melodic folk pop full of gorgeous harmonies" while Psychedelic Folk's Gerald Van Waes noted the "warm, delicate beautiful harmony vocals, simple guitars and percussion" making it "a beautiful album and another winner for true and truthful acid folk collectors".

Professional ratings
Review scores
Source	Rating
PopMatters	7/10 stars
Shindig!	Positive
Uncut	4/5 stars

=== Joy Ride on Memory Lane ===
Joy Ride on Memory Lane received positive reviews. For PopMatters, Stephen Haag described the album as "Utterly Charming" and noted that the duo "definitely have near-encyclopedic knowledge of the Britfolk/psych genre". Shindig! magazine's Pat Curran described the songs as "highly melodic, warm and inviting" and commented that the album "bears repeated listening and comes highly recommended". Uncut magazine's Rob Young said the father and son "make a hugely sympathetic pairing" and that the album "combines the best elements of Brit folk-rock's heyday".

== The TimeLarks ==
In 2011, Martin and Tom began performing as part of the folk trio The TimeLarks and appeared at the 2012 International Pop Overthrow festival at the Cavern Club in Liverpool. In 2016, they released two progressive acoustic folk albums, Wheel of Stone and Grain of Light.
