= Helena Espvall =

Swedish-American musician

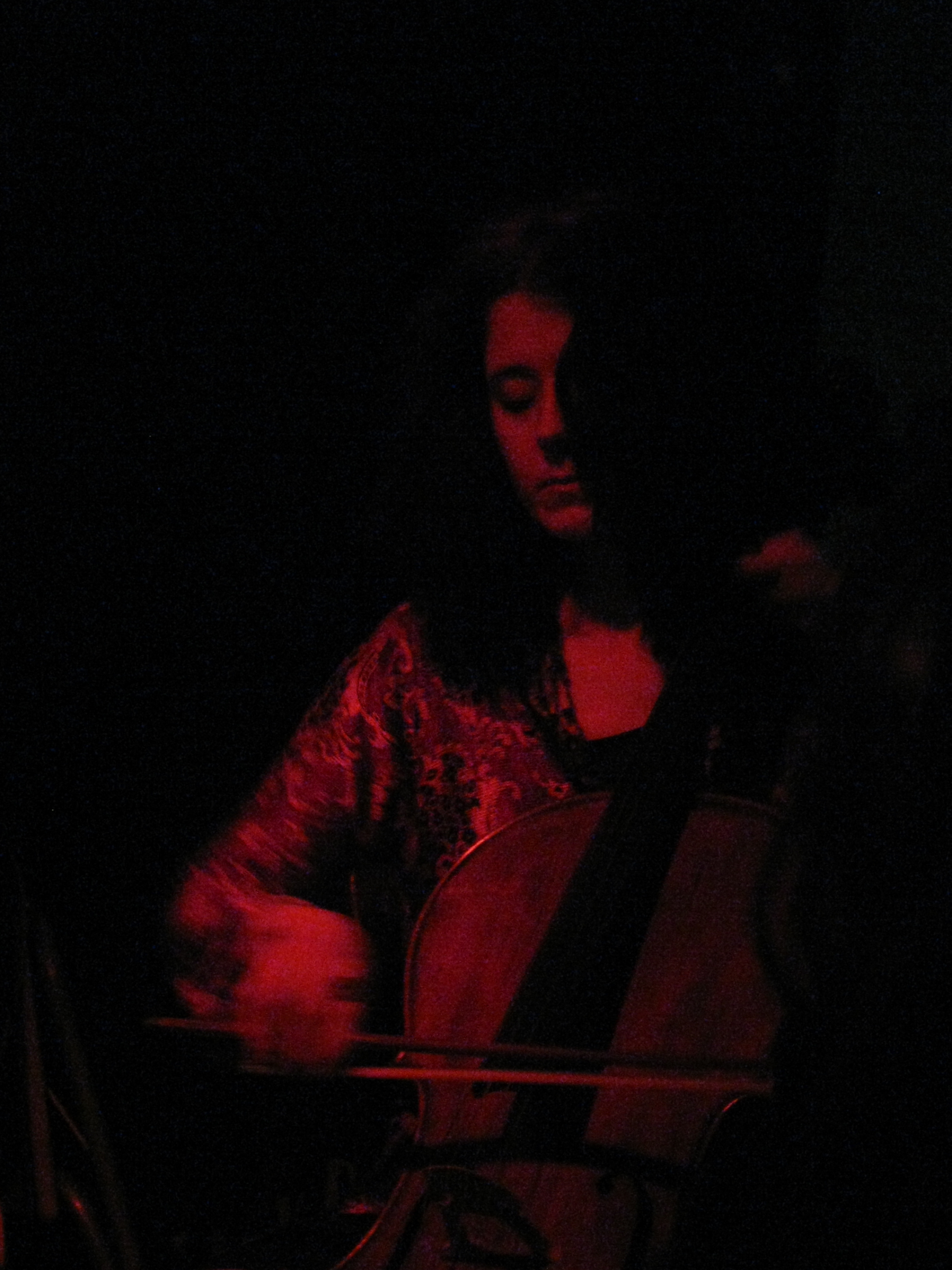

Background information
- Genres: Experimental, free improv, psychedelic folk, folk, drone
- Instruments: Cello, guitar, voice
- Labels: Drag City, Fire Museum, Pax, alt.vinyl

Helena Espvall is a Swedish–American musician noted for her participation in the post-millennial psychedelic folk and free improv scenes. Her primary instruments are cello, guitar, and voice.

== Career ==
Espvall's early career included work with Arabian music ensemble Sumer and with Projektor 7, a silent movie orchestra formed by members of Swedish pop group Komeda. She relocated to Philadelphia, USA in the year 2000. Time spent concentrating on cello improvisation led to performances at the High Zero festival in 2001 and 2002.

Espvall subsequently entered Philadelphia's flourishing psychedelic and weird-folk circles. She joined Espers shortly after they recorded their first album, was a member of The Valerie Project, and formed the duo Anahita with Tara Burke (a.k.a. Fursaxa). In 2006, a trio consisting of Espvall, Espers bandmate Meg Baird, and English folk singer Sharron Kraus released an album of traditional folk songs under the title Leaves From Off The Tree.

2006 also saw the release of Espvall's first solo album, Nimis & Arx, named after the large-scale sculptures erected in the micronation of Ladonia by Swedish artist Lars Vilks.

Collaboration with Masaki Batoh (of Japanese psych band Ghost) produced two albums released by the Drag City label. The first of these, Helena Espvall & Masaki Batoh, included several Swedish folk songs and marked the first prominent appearance of Espvall's vocals. A BBC review called it "beautifully fragile, remarkably melodic and enticingly charming". 2009's Overloaded Ark tilted toward extended psychedelic jams, featuring members of Ghost Junzo Tateiwa and Kazuo Ogino as well as ancient music specialist Haruo Kondo. The album's varied instrumentation included acoustic and electric guitars, cello, organ, shō, banjo, renaissance harp, rauschpfeife, crumhorn, cornamuse, hurdy-gurdy, recorders, piano, frame drums, darbuka, riq, and electronics.

In 2010, Espvall released Lapidary, an improvised collaboration with noise/drone figure Marcia Bassett. Writing for The Wire magazine, Keith Moliné compared it to the first Ash Ra Tempel album and dubbed it "an impressively powerful record".

Espvall frequently lends cello playing to the work of other musicians. She has been a member of the touring bands for Vashti Bunyan, Damon and Naomi, Ghost, and Marissa Nadler; she has made guest appearances on records by Bert Jansch, Arborea, and Charalambides, among others.

== Discography ==
=== Solo ===
- Nimis & Arx CD (2006) (Fire Museum/Pax Recordings)

=== As part of Espers ===
- "Riding" / "Under The Waterfall" 7" single (2005) (Wichita)
- The Weed Tree CD/LP (2005) (Locust Music)
- II CD/LP (2006) (Drag City)
- III CD/LP (2009) (Drag City)

=== As part of The Valerie Project ===
- The Valerie Project CD/2LP (2007) (Drag City)

=== As part of Anahita ===
- Arcana En Cantos CD-R/LP (2006/2010) (Deserted Village/alt.vinyl)
- Matricaria CD (2008) (Important Records)
- Tourmaline LP (2016) (Three:Four Records)

=== With Sharron Kraus and Meg Baird ===
- Leaves from Off the Tree CD/LP (2006) (Bo'Weavil Recordings)

=== With Masaki Batoh ===
- Helena Espvall & Masaki Batoh CD/LP (2008) (Drag City)
- Overloaded Ark CD/2LP (2009) (Drag City)

=== With Marcia Bassett ===
- Lapidary Cassette/LP (2010) (Heavy Blossom/alt.vinyl)

=== With Marielle Jakobsons and Agnes Szelag ===
- Espvall/Jakobsons/Szelag: Improvisations for Strings and Electronics CD-R [edition of 100] (2012) (Arachnidiscs)

=== With Alan Sondheim and Azure Carter ===
- Cauldron LP (2012) (Tequila Sunrise/Fire Museum)

=== With Ernesto Diaz-Infante ===
- A Hallowed Shell of Ash and Rust CD (2013) (Erototox Decodings)

=== With David Maranha ===
- Sombras Incendiadas LP (2015) (Three:Four Records)

=== Compilation appearances ===
- The Garden of Forking Paths CD (2007) (Important Records)
- We are all one, In the Sun: A tribute to Robbie Basho CD/LP (2010/2011) (Important Records/alt.vinyl)

== Personal life ==
Espvall is from northern Sweden. She started playing electric guitar and cello when she was a teenager. She lives now in Lisbon, Portugal.
