= Poison Tree =

Poison Tree may refer to:

== Literature ==
- "A Poison Tree", a 1794 poem by William Blake
- Poison Tree (novel), a 2012 novel by Amelia Atwater-Rhodes
- The Poison Tree (play), a play by Robert Glaudini
- The Poison Tree, 1994 novel by Cynthia Harrod-Eagles
- The Poison Tree, 2009 book by Erin Kelly
- Vishabriksha (The Poison Tree), 1873 novel by Bankim Chandra Chattopadhyay

== Music ==
- The Poison Tree, a band led by Nick Castro
- "A Poison Tree", classical song by Benjamin Britten on the Blake poem
- "A Poison Tree", song by Gary Lucas from Gods and Monsters
- "A Poison Tree", song by Finn Coren from Spring: The Appendix
- "A Poison Tree", song by North Sea Radio Orchestra from Birds
- "Poison Tree", song by Beth Orton from Sugaring Season
- "Poison Tree", a musical rendering of the Blake poem by Goanna
- "Poison Tree", song by Finnish a cappella ensemble Rajaton from Boundless
- "Poison Tree", electronic song by Grouper
- "The Poison Tree", 2006 song by David Axelrod from Songs of Experience
- "The Poison Tree", song by Greg Brown Songs of Innocence and of Experience
- "The Poison Tree", song by Moby from Destroyed

== See also ==
- Fruit of the poisonous tree, a legal metaphor used to describe evidence that is obtained illegally
