= Jan Dukes de Grey =

English folk band

- Also known as: Noys Band
- Genres: Progressive folk; psychedelic folk; folk rock
- Years active: 1968–1975, 1977
- Labels: Deram Records, Transatlantic Records
- Past members: Derek Noy; Michael Bairstow; Denis Conlan; Eddy Spence; Patrick Dean; Fiona Dellar; Danny Lagger; Maurice McElroy; Alan Ronds; Peter Lemer

Jan Dukes de Grey was a short-lived English folk band that was primarily active in the early 1970s. Despite a relatively limited output and a lukewarm contemporary reception in terms of sales, the band has attracted a cult following and has seen a moderate revival of interest following the 2010 release of their previously completed but unpublished 1977 album, Strange Terrain. Jan Dukes de Grey are considered to have been among the least conventional musicians associated with the progressive folk scene and in particular their 1971 album, Mice And Rats In The Loft, has come to be viewed as a seminal British acid folk album and as one of the wildest relics of the florid post-hippie era.

== History ==
The origins of Jan Dukes de Grey can be traced to the 11-man early-to-mid-1960s soul group, Buster Summers Express. While performing as a member of Buster Summers, multi-instrumentalist and vocalist Derek Noy began to write his own music and to incorporate his material into Buster Summers' pieces. Receiving positive support for these innovations, and anxious to perform his own material exclusively, Noy split from the group in 1968 to pursue his own musical direction based more extensively on the emerging underground sound of the day (characterized by bands such as Cream, Pink Floyd, and Jethro Tull). Noy, penning 50 to 60 titles within the next six months, was approached by guitarist/fipple-flautist Michael Bairstow who wished to join Buster Summers Express. Noy explained that he was interested in starting a new band instead, and Bairstow soon agreed.

Formed in Leeds in December 1968, the original incarnation of the band consisted of the duo Derek Noy and Michael Bairstow. The name "Jan Dukes de Grey" was developed by Noy as an exotic-sounding title with no further significance. Gigging and refining Noy's original compositions for the next several months at local venues, Jan Dukes de Grey was signed in 1969 by Decca Records. By October 1969, the 18-track Sorcerers was recorded. The album consisted entirely of original pieces by Noy that have been described by reviewers as naive and instinctive with good musicality, but lacking in technique especially in the flute accompaniment. (Note: Flautist Bairstow had only learned to play the traditional flute a few months earlier.)

In October 1969, just after Sorcerers had been recorded, former Buster Summers drummer Denis Conlan joined the band and a new brace of gigging began. Though all pieces performed were written by Noy, the band's sound changed considerably during this period to become more strongly progressive and improvisational. This new sound resonated favorably with the university circuit and soon they had achieved a small measure of success, opening for Pink Floyd in November 1969 and The Who in May 1970. Despite this encouragement, sales of Sorcerers (released in January 1970) were mediocre and the band was forced to sign with the better-distributed Transatlantic Records for their next album, the epic three-track Mice and Rats in the Loft (released in June 1971). Markedly different from their debut album, the second Jan Dukes de Grey album has been described as less-fragmented and more extreme than Sorcerers. The much longer track-lengths provided the band the opportunity to expand their more improvisational sound and to develop complex progressive themes in a wild and manic manner often favorably compared to Comus' First Utterance.

Sales of Mice and Rats in the Loft were again tepid and the recording costs advanced by Transatlantic meant that savings had to be made in advertising and the album received little press. Jan Dukes de Grey carried on performing local shows for the next several years, briefly adding former Buster Summers keyboard- and saxophone-player Eddy Spence in late 1970. Bairstow left the band in early 1973 to be replaced by guitarist Patrick Dean, a fan who had written glowing reviews of the band for the Yorkshire Evening Post. By the end of 1973, Conlon also left the band and was replaced by Noy's wife Fiona Dellar. Two other musicians, bassist Danny Lagger and drummer Maurice McElroy joined immediately after Dellar.

By April 1974, the band changed its name to "Noy's Band" and added bass guitarist Alan Ronds to be signed to the Dawn label. As Noy's Band the group released only one single, a reinterpretation of "Love Potion Number 9" paired with Noy's original piece "Eldorado". When this release flopped the band began to unravel, finally disbanding in August 1975. Noy, Dellar, and McElroy then joined with musician Nick Griffiths to perform briefly as punk band, Rip Snorter, through 1976 and the start of 1977.

In the meanwhile, starting in late 1975, Noy had renewed acquaintance with Pink Floyd and had begun discussing the possibility of a solo-project on the side. This new incarnation of Jan Dukes de Grey would consist primarily of Noy, with Dellar, McElroy, and the newly added keyboardist Peter Lemer providing backup. Additional guests including former Jan Dukes de Grey members as well as a slew of other musicians and personalities would also contribute to songs in an ad hoc manner. At the time, Pink Floyd drummer Nick Mason was heavily involved with Britannia Row Studios and Noy was offered a production deal in 1976 for a new Jan Dukes de Grey album to be recorded at Britannia Row. The third Jan Dukes de Grey album, Strange Terrain took just over a year to complete and cost nearly £100,000 to make. Guest performers on various tracks included Ray Cooper, actor Michael Gothard (playing saxophone), and actress Lydia Lisle, among others. The album was never released and the band dissolved for good shortly afterward. The third and final album at last saw a release in 2010 under the Cherrytree label.

== Influences ==
The most apparent early influence on Jan Dukes de Grey was the British soul group, Buster Summers Express of which three one-time members of the band were members and that founding member Bairstow had originally intended to join. The Jan Dukes de Grey sound diverged from Buster Summers considerably, however, beginning with the influences of Cream, Pink Floyd, and Jethro Tull. Bairstow's use of the flute drew directly from Noy's interest in Donovan, and in creating their debut album Sorcerers the band drew inspiration from such bands as T. Rex and The Incredible String Band. Later in the lifespan of Jan Dukes de Grey, a heavier and more progressive sound was adopted such that Strange Terrain was described as demonstrating influence from Arthur Brown, David Bowie, and mid-1970s Pink Floyd.

== Personnel ==
- Derek Noy – Lead Vocals, Guitar and Multi-instrumental (Keyboard, Bass, Percussion, Trumpet, Trombone, Zelda Chord)
- Michael Bairstow (1968–73) – Wind (Flute, Recorder, Clarinet, Saxophone, Trumpet), Percussion, Keyboard, Harmony Vocals
- Dennis Conlon (1969–73) – Drums, Percussion, Harmony Vocals
- Eddy Spence (1970) – Keyboard, Saxophone
- Patrick Dean (1973–75) – Guitar
- Fiona Dellar (1973–75, 1977) – Percussion, Keyboard, Spoken Word
- Danny Lagger (1973–75) – Bass
- Maurice McElroy (1973–75, 1977) – Drums, Percussion
- Alan Ronds (1974) – Bass Guitar
- Peter Lemer (1977) – Keyboards

== Discography ==
=== Studio albums ===
- Sorcerers (Deram, 1970)
- Mice And Rats In The Loft (Transatlantic, 1971)
- Strange Terrain (completed 1977, unreleased at the time); (Release: Cherrytree Records, 2010)

=== Singles ===
- "Love Potion Number 9" / "Eldorado" (Dawn Records, 1974); Released under the name 'Noys Band'
