= Heron Oblivion =

- Origin: San Francisco, California
- Genres: Psychedelic rock, folk rock
- Years active: 2014–present
- Labels: Sub Pop Records
- Members: Meg Baird, Ethan Miller, Noel Von Harmonson, Charlie Saufley
- Website: www.subpop.com/artists/heron_oblivion

Heron Oblivion is an American psychedelic rock supergroup that first performed in April 2014, when they opened for the War on Drugs. Its members, all of whom were active in the psych-rock scene in the mid 2000s, are singer and drummer Meg Baird (formerly of Espers), bassist Ethan Miller (Comets on Fire and Howlin' Rain), guitarist Noel Von Harmonson (Comets on Fire, Sic Alps), and second guitarist Charlie Saufley (Assemble Head in Sunburst Sound). The band released its first album, which was self-titled, on March 4, 2016, on Sub Pop Records.

== Critical reception ==
Heron Oblivion received mostly favorable reviews from critics: according to Metacritic, the album has a score of 80 out of 100, indicating "generally favorable reviews". Aaron Leitko wrote in the Washington Post that the album "moves elegantly between extremes — soft and loud, harmony and dissonance." Writing for Pitchfork Media, Leitko gave the album a score of 7.7 out of 10 and described its songs as "moody and dark, with clear moments of guitar solo-driven catharsis." Doug Mosurock wrote for NPR that the album "restores both austerity and blistering excess to the form, following in the footsteps of Fairport Convention, Jefferson Airplane and the purists that came after (Major Stars, Vermonster and the rest of the Twisted Village roster, for starters, as well as Polvo and Sonic Youth, who cut their own trails throughout the '80s and '90s)."
