= The Golden Apples of the Sun (album) =

Compilation album by Various artists
- Released: April 1, 2004
- Genre: Freak folk
- Length: 72:22
- Label: Bastet

Professional ratings
Review scores
Source	Rating
Pitchfork	8.6/10

The Golden Apples of the Sun is a limited edition compilation of contemporary folk music curated by musician Devendra Banhart for the art magazine Arthur Magazine. It collected 20 songs performed by recent underground folk and psychedelic artists and has since become considered the definitive compilation of what some have dubbed the New Weird America movement. It also featured artwork by Banhart himself.

== Critical reception ==
According to Pitchfork, the compilation "assisted greatly" in defining the term "freak folk," while Stereogum notes the aftermath of its release as "the moment when a descriptive phrase solidified into a genre." At the time, Pitchfork described the album as "a kind of now-sound capsule of the contemporary neo-folk scene" and the featured artists as "20 diverse freakfolk acts to serve as representatives of the various facets of the underground's most recent (and most promising) pigeonhole." Pitchfork's review concluded:

[...] Golden Apples of the Sun's sprawling landscape presents a persuasive case for the depth of a scene that seemingly sprung up (like mushrooms) overnight. It's impossible to pick apart intentions, but this music feels far more sincere than other recent buzzes, and even if these artists are pulling the wool over our eyes (which seems unlikely), it would appear that perhaps a few of these players will outlast the current critical harvesting.

== Track listing ==
No.	Title	Artist	Length
1.	"Angels' Share"	Vetiver	4:17
2.	"Bridges and Balloons"	Joanna Newsom	3:38
3.	"Hazy St."	Six Organs of Admittance	3:24
4.	"Crosses"	Viking Moses	2:22
5.	"Little Life"	Josephine Foster	3:44
6.	"Byss and Abyss"	Espers	6:03
7.	"Rejoicing in the Hands"	Vashti Bunyan and Devendra Banhart	1:41
8.	"Farm, GA"	Jana Hunter	3:45
9.	"The Tropics of Cancer"	Currituck Co.	5:01
10.	"Don't Need"	White Magic	4:44
11.	"Fever Dream"	Iron & Wine	4:15
12.	"Heat From Every Corner"	Diane Cluck	3:29
13.	"Mountains of Yaffa"	Matt Valentine	1:06
14.	"You Must Turn"	Entrance	2:17
15.	"White Mule"	Jack Rose	3:00
16.	"Look at What the Light Did Now"	Little Wings	3:17
17.	"Wet Road"	Scout Niblett	3:21
18.	"Mexicana"	Troll	3:29
19.	"Good Friday"	CocoRosie	4:21
20.	"The Lake"	Antony	4:46
Total length:			72:00
