= To Keep from Crying =

Studio album by Comus
- Released: 1974
- Recorded: 1973–1974
- Genre: Psychedelic folk, progressive rock, progressive folk
- Label: Virgin, Dawn
- Producer: Comus

Comus chronology
First Utterance (1971)	To Keep from Crying (1974)	Out of the Coma (2012)

To Keep from Crying is the second album by progressive folk band Comus, released in 1974. It featured a notably different lineup from their other releases, with the violin/viola and woodwind spots replaced by keyboards and a conventional drum kit. The album's content has also been noted as sounding more mainstream than their earlier work, which centred more in conventional progressive rock and folk.

== Reception ==
Professional ratings
Review scores
Source	Rating
AllMusic	2.5/5 stars

AllMusic's retrospective review praised the vocal arrangements and male/female harmonies of songs such as "Figure in Your Dreams" and "Perpetual Motion", and were even more endeared to "dark folk songs" such as "Touch Down", with its "ghostly children's chorus" and "cosmic synth tones". However, they criticized the Japanese issue of the album for editing "Waves and Caves" and "After the Dream" down to well under a minute each and concluded "The record is pretty good, but it has the misfortune of paling in the shadow of its nightmarish predecessor."

== Track listing ==
All tracks are written by Roger Wootton, except where noted.

Side one
No.	Title	Writer(s)	Lead vocals	Length
1.	"Down (Like a Movie Star)"		Wootton	4:06
2.	"Touch Down"		Wootton	4:45
3.	"Waves and Caves"	Andy Hellaby	none	1:32
4.	"Figure in Your Dreams"		Watson	3:10
5.	"Children of the Universe"		Wootton and Watson	5:37

Side two
No.	Title	Writer(s)	Lead vocals	Length
1.	"So Long Supernova"		Wootton	3:20
2.	"Perpetual Motion"		Watson and Wootton	4:07
3.	"Panophany"	Hellaby	none	0:26
4.	"Get Yourself a Man"	Keith Hale	Watson	7:07
5.	"To Keep from Crying"		Watson and Wootton	5:27
6.	"After the Dream"		none	0:59

== Personnel ==
- Bobbie Watson – lead and backing vocals, percussion, recorder
- Roger Wootton – guitar, lead and backing vocals
- Keith Hale – piano, organ, electric piano, synthesizer, marimba
- Andy Hellaby – bass, autoharp, tape effects
- Gordon Coxon – drums, percussion

=== Additional musicians ===
- Philip Barry – bongos
- Lindsay Cooper – bassoon on "To Keep from Crying"
- Didier Malherbe – saxophone on "Get Yourself a Man"
- Tim Kraemer – cello on "So Long Supernova"
