= Furling =

Furling may refer to:

- Furling (Stargate), characters in the series Stargate SG-1
- Furl (sailing), to gather a sail
- Furling (aerodynamics), to manipulating an airfoil
- The Furlings, characters in the 1993 film Once Upon a Forest
- Furling (album), a 2023 album by Meg Baird
