= Don't Weigh Down the Light =

Studio album by Meg Baird
- Released: June 23, 2015
- Recorded: November – December 2014
- Genre: Folk
- Length: 46:26
- Label: Drag City

Meg Baird chronology
Seasons on Earth (2011)	Don't Weigh Down the Light (2015)	Furling (2023)

Don't Weigh Down the Light is the fourth studio album by folk singer Meg Baird, released in 2015 on the Wichita label in the UK and the Drag City label in the US.

== Reception ==
Professional ratings
Aggregate scores
Source	Rating
AnyDecentMusic?	7.1/10
Metacritic	79/100
Review scores
Source	Rating
AllMusic	4/5 stars
Blurt	5/5 stars
Drowned in Sound	7/10
musicOMH	4/5 stars
Pitchfork	7.1/10
Record Collector	5/5 stars
Tiny Mix Tapes	3.5/5 stars

Don't Weigh Down the Light received positive reviews from critics. On Metacritic, the album scores 79/100 based on 18 reviews, indicating "generally favorable reviews".

Ben Ratliff of The New York Times spoke positively about the album, describing it as "A true post-folk record, dyed in the acoustic sound of the English and Californian folk movements of the late 1960s and early ’70s, but not particularly scholarly or eccentric. Helen Brown of The Telegraph also shared positive sentiments, stating "All 11 original songs spiral out from a strong, controlled core of patience".

Kitty Empire of The Observer (now owned by The Guardian) was more critical of the album and its "unceasingly calm and atmospheric" tone, further stating "The theme here is bittersweet leave-taking, as track titles such as Past Houses imply. Not a great deal seems to be happening – then you are suddenly brought up short by the guitar that sings out on Back to You or the polyphony of Leaving Song".

== Track listing ==
1. "Counterfeiters" – 3:27
2. "I Don't Mind" – 6:11
3. "Mosquito Hawks" – 3:21
4. "Back to You" – 4:18
5. "Past Houses" – 5:03
6. "Leaving Song" – 1:03
7. "Stars Unwinding" – 5:23
8. "Good Directions" – 5:24
9. "Don't Weigh Down the Light" – 5:41
10. "Even the Walls Don't Want You to Go" – 3:43
11. "Past Houses (Reprise)" – 2:52
