= Crazy Horse (disambiguation) =

Crazy Horse (c. 1840–1877) was an American Sioux chief.

Crazy Horse may also refer to:

== Clubs ==
- Crazy Horse (cabaret), a French night club
- Crazy Horse, Stockholm, a defunct tavern in Stockholm, Sweden
- Crazy Horse (Beirut), a Lebanese cabaret and brothel
- Crazy Horse, a fictional nightclub managed by Adriana La Cerva in The Sopranos

== Film ==
- Crazy Horse (1996 film), a western film
- Crazy Horse (2011 film), a documentary film about the French night club
- Chief Crazy Horse (film), a 1955 western movie starring Victor Mature

== Music ==
- Crazy Horse (band), an American rock band associated with Neil Young
  - Crazy Horse (album)
- Crazy Horse, an album by Paradiso Girls
- "Crazy Horses", a 1972 song by The Osmonds

== People with the nickname ==
- Charles Bennett (fighter) (born 1979), American martial arts fighter
- Kandia Crazy Horse, American musician and rock critic
- Mike Cuellar (1937–2010), American professional baseball pitcher
- Emlyn Hughes (1947–2004), English footballer
- Lewis Moody (born 1978), English professional rugby player
- Ángel Pagán (born 1981), Puerto Rican professional baseball player
- Ram Vaswani (born 1970), English professional poker player

== Other uses ==
- Crazyhorse (magazine), an American magazine that publishes fiction, poetry, and essays
- Crazy Horse rifle
- Crazy Horse, the original name of the BP Thunder Horse Oil Field Project

== See also ==
- Crazy Horse Memorial
- Crazy Horse Too, a former Las Vegas strip club
