= Fresh Maggots =

Folk duo

- RCA promotional photo (1971)

Background information
- Origin: Nuneaton, England
- Genres: Folk, psychedelic rock
- Years active: 1970–1971, 2019-present
- Labels: RCA Victor, Sunbeam (UK), Amber Soundroom (Germany), Coventry Music Museum
- Past members: Mick Burgoyne; Leigh Dolphin

Fresh Maggots are a folk duo from Nuneaton, Warwickshire in England, consisting of Mick Burgoyne and Leigh Dolphin, who played a variety of instruments including guitars, glockenspiel, tin whistles and strings. They released two albums in 1971 and 2020, but sustained interest in the 1971 album saw it re-released several times.

== History ==
Taking their name from a newspaper advert for a sports shop that proclaimed "fresh maggots always available", the pair were spotted by Mike Berry of the Sparta Florida Music Company in September 1970 while playing only their second concert at Wolvey village hall, and signed a publishing deal with the company. They were signed by RCA Records, who released their only album in 1971 - when they were nineteen years of age. Fresh Maggots was recorded at the Radio Luxembourg studios in London over several months at a cost of 1,500 pounds, and produced by Berry. Although its release was preceded by some degree of anticipation, delays in publishing gradually saw interest wane. Upon its release, it was met with favourable reviews, however record sales did not reflect this, and pressing was decommissioned soon after. The duo went on to play two live shows broadcast by BBC Radio 1. They released one single, "Car Song", before splitting up.

The resurgent popularity of folk music over the last decade reawakened interest in the band and the album became a collector's item fetching hundreds of pounds; The duo started to receive airplay in the US, prompting a reissue in 2006 as Fresh Maggots...Hatched on the Sunbeam label in the UK and Amber Soundroom in Germany, with the tracks from the "Car Song" single added. The reissued album received a three and a half stars review from Allmusic, and an 8 out of 10 score from PopMatters, with Whitney Strub describing it as "a remarkably assured debut—and finale". Kevin Hainey, reviewing it for Exclaim!, stated the group's "concise and fast-paced songwriting tendencies certainly make this stuff transcend its own age in a strange and wonderful way". John M. James, in the River Cities' Reader described it as a "five-star masterpiece of hypnotic vocals, electric fuzz guitar, trippy tin whistle, and shimmering six- and 12-string guitars". After being contacted by a German music magazine for an interview in 2017 they started writing songs again. Their album 'Waiting For The Sun' was released in October 2020 exactly 49 years after the release of their first album.

== Discography ==
=== Studio albums ===
List of studio albums
Title	Album details
Fresh Maggots	Released: October 1971; Label: RCA Victor; Formats: LP
Waiting for the Sun	Released: 31 October 2020; Label: Coventry Music Museum; Formats: CD, digital download, streaming

=== Singles ===
List of singles
Title	Year	Album
"Car Song" / "What Would You Do"	1971	Non-album single

=== Compilation appearances ===
List of compilation appearances
Title	Year	Album
"Rosemary Hill"	2004	Gather in the Mushrooms (The British Acid Folk Underground 1968-1974)
"Dole Song"	2009	Shifting Sands: 20 Treasures from the Heyday of Underground Folk
"Rosemary Hill"	2015	Dust on the Nettles: A Journey Through the British Underground Folk Scene 1967-1972)
"What I Am"	2019	Strangers in the Room: A Journey Through British Folk-Rock (1967-1973)
"The House Carpenter"	2020	Sumer Is Icumen In: The Pagan Sound of British and Irish Folk 1966–75
