= First Utterance =

Studio album by Comus
- Released: 1971
- Recorded: November–December 1970
- Studios: Pye Studios, London
- Genres: Psychedelic folk, progressive folk
- Length: 49:17
- Label: Dawn DNLS 3019
- Producer: Barry Murray

Comus chronology
First Utterance (1971)	To Keep from Crying (1974)

First Utterance is the first studio album by the English progressive folk band Comus. It was released in 1971, with "Diana" being released as a single.

First Utterance was notable for its unique blend of progressive rock, folk, psychedelia, and themes of paganism and the macabre. The overall tone of the album is of vulnerable innocence facing abusive power, with songs dealing with such themes as necrophilia ("Drip Drip"), rape ("Diana", "Song to Comus") and shock therapy ("The Prisoner").

References to Comus by other bands and artists include Opeth, citing its lyrics in album and song titles and tattoos. Current 93 covered "Diana" as the opening song on their 1997 LP Horsey.

== Artwork ==
The cover artwork was drawn in ball point pen by Roger Wootton, lead singer and songwriter of the band. The centerfold artwork was painted by guitarist Glenn Goring.

== Reception and legacy ==
Professional ratings
Review scores
Source	Rating
Allmusic	3/5 stars
Crawdaddy!	(very favorable)
Tiny Mix Tapes	5/5 stars

Contemporary reception was positive, with NME praising the album's "highly unusual but fascinating sound" and Time Out calling it "unique". However, sales were limited and the band dissolved after the album's release. Early biographies of Comus stated that a postal strike was one of the reasons that the album did poorly; however, none have provided an explanation for how a postal strike would have affected one particular album's sales.

The Wire included it on their 1998 list of "100 Records That Set The World On Fire [When No One Was Listening]", calling it "folk rock at its most delirious, devilish, and dynamic." In 2014, FACT Magazine ranked it the 22nd best album of the 1970s, writing:

Based in Kent, Comus specialised in ingenious hokum: squawking tales of torture, pagan worship, zephyrs and psychotics. Unsurprisingly, they barely made a commercial ripple [...], but from the twanging fiddles and eldritch voices of ‘Diana’ onwards, First Utterance is both unapologetically weird and commendably self-assured. It’s extremely – and sometimes off-puttingly – mannered, but if you’re looking for the square root of the mid-2000s freak-folk explosion, this is it.

== Track listing ==
Side one
No.	Title	Writer(s)	Length
1.	"Diana"	Colin Pearson	4:37
2.	"The Herald"	Andy Hellaby, Glen Goring, Roger Wootton	12:15
3.	"Drip Drip"	Wootton	10:56

Side two
No.	Title	Writer(s)	Length
4.	"Song to Comus"	Wootton	7:31
5.	"The Bite"	Wootton	5:27
6.	"Bitten"	Hellaby, Pearson	2:16
7.	"The Prisoner"	Wootton	6:15

Digital release
No.	Title	Writer(s)	Length
8.	"All the Colours of Darkness"	Pearson	7:21
Total length:			56:38

== Personnel ==
- Roger Wootton – acoustic guitar, lead vocals, cover art
- Glenn Goring – 6- and 12-string acoustic guitars, electric guitar, slide guitar, hand drums, backing vocals
- Andy Hellaby – bass guitar, slide bass, backing vocals
- Colin Pearson – violin, viola
- Rob Young – flute, oboe, hand drums
- Bobbie Watson – lead and backing vocals, percussion

=== Production ===
- Comus – arrangements
- Barry Murray – producer
- Jeff Calver – recording, engineer
