= Espers (album) =

Studio album by Espers
- Released: January 20, 2004
- Recorded: 2003
- Genres: Folk, psychedelic folk
- Length: 40:25
- Labels: Locust Music, Wichita Recordings

Espers chronology
Espers (2004)	The Weed Tree (2005)

Professional ratings
Review scores
Source	Rating
AllMusic	4/5 stars
Pitchfork	8.4/10

Espers is the self-titled debut studio album by the band Espers. It was released in 2004 on Locust Music. The album was produced by the group's original trio and establishes their contemporary psychedelic folk sound.

== Track listing ==
1. "Flowery Noontide" - 4:10
2. "Meadow" - 4:11
3. "Riding" - 4:09
4. "Voices" - 3:44
5. "Hearts & Daggers" - 8:34
6. "Byss & Abyss" - 6:03
7. "Daughter" - 3:03
8. "Travel Mountains" - 6:30
