= Helen Brown (author) =

Author and columnist

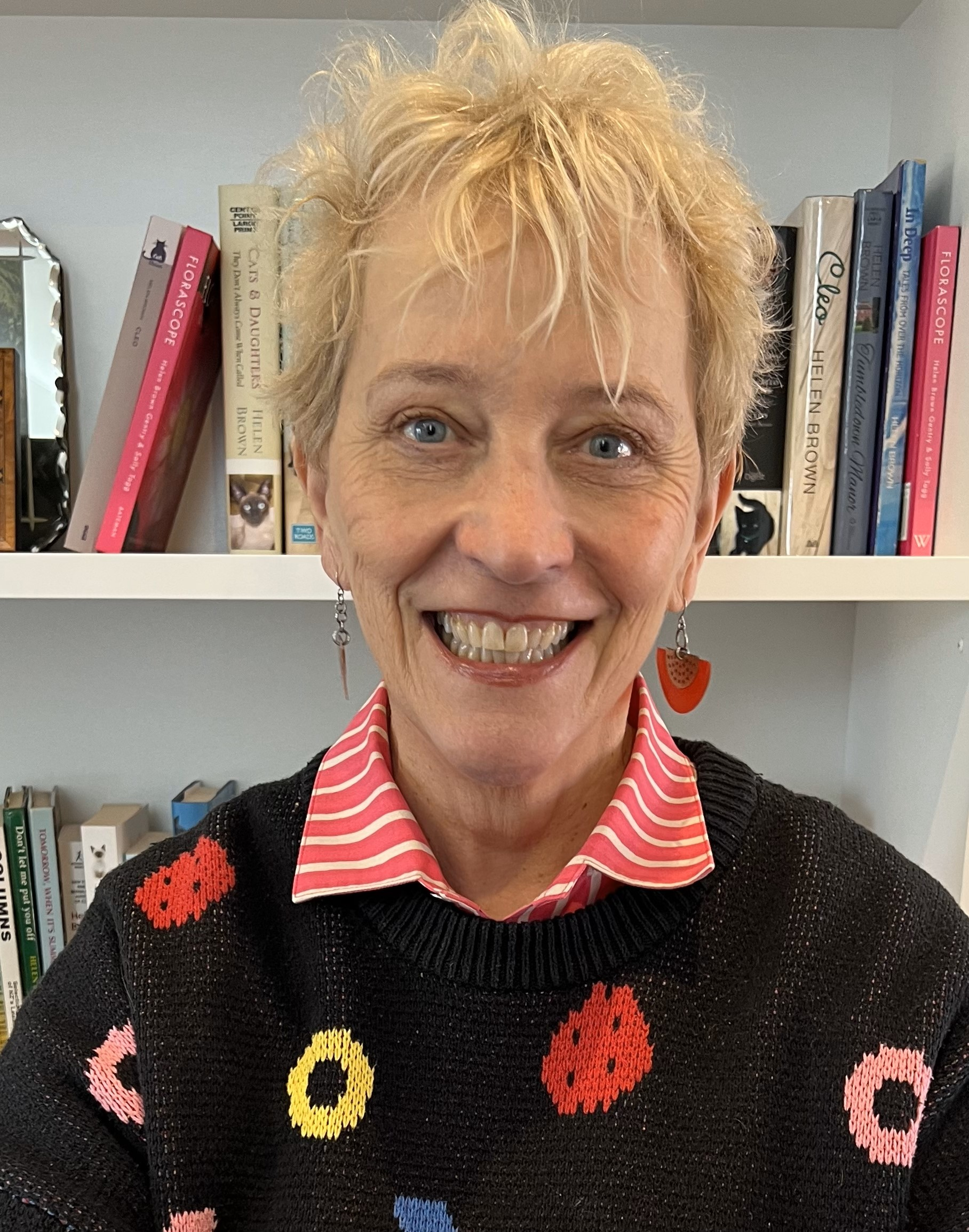
- Born: Helen Blackman; 1954 (age 71–72); New Plymouth, New Zealand
- Education: Wellington Polytechnic School of Journalism; Cambridge University United Kingdom
- Occupation: Writer
- Spouses: Steve Brown (1972–1986); Philip Gentry (1991–present)
- Children: 4
- Writing career
- Language: English
- Website: www.helenbrown.com.au

Helen Brown (née Blackman; born 1954) is a New Zealand-born author, best known for her memoirs about cats and the meaning of life. She has written 15 books, including her memoir "Cleo", a New York Times and UK Sunday Times bestseller that has been published in more than 18 languages in 73 countries, and sold 2 million copies.

== Personal life ==
Brown was born in 1954 in New Plymouth. She studied journalism at Wellington Polytechnic. At age 18 she flew to England to marry her first husband, Steve, whom she had met three years prior. They returned to New Zealand and had two sons, Sam and Rob. Sam was hit by a car and killed on 21 January 1983, aged 9. Soon after, her family adopted a kitten, about which she wrote her best-selling book Cleo. The book is about a small black cat who helped mend a family's broken hearts. Cleo lived to be 23 years old. Brown had one more child, Lydia, with her first husband before they divorced.

Brown married her second husband, Philip Gentry, in 1991. Together they had one daughter, Katharine. They moved to Melbourne in 1997 and have lived there since. Brown underwent a mastectomy after being diagnosed with breast cancer. During recovery, her sister suggested she get another cat. She adopted a Siamese cat and named him Jonah, after Jonah Lomu the famous rugby player. Jonah became the subject of her next book, After Cleo.

When Brown fostered a rescue cat, Bono, in New York, her Huffington Post blog about finding a home for him had more than 26 million readers. Her book Bono, The Amazing Story of a Rescue Who Inspired a Community was translated into several languages.

She has since published a version of Cleo for younger readers, Cleo and Rob, illustrated by Phoebe Morris. Her next book will be Mickey, The Cat Who Raised Me.

== Awards ==
- 1991 Nuffield Press Fellowship – Cambridge University of United Kingdom
- 2005 Columnist of the Year – Magazine Publishers Association of New Zealand
- 2007 Columnist of the Year – Magazine Publishers Association of New Zealand
- 2008 Columnist of the Year – Magazine Publishers Association of New Zealand
- 2009 Columnist of the Year – Qantas Media Awards

== Works ==
- Don't Let Me Put You Off: How to Survive in New Zealand Suburbia (1981)
- Confessions of a Bride Doll (1983)
- Tomorrow, When It's Summer (1987)
- Clouds of Happiness (1988)
- Fresh Starts And Finishing Lines (1990)
- A Guide to Modern Manners (1991)
- In Deep (1996)
- From the Heart (2001)
- Florascope (2003)
- Cleo (2010)
- After Cleo (2013), published in the US as Cats and Daughters
- Tumbledown Manor (2014)
- Bono (2018)
- Cleo & Rob (2019)
