= Furling (album) =

Studio album by Meg Baird
- Released: January 27, 2023
- Genre: Psychedelic folk
- Length: 43:42
- Label: Drag City
- Producer: Charlie Saufley; Meg Baird

Meg Baird chronology
Don't Weigh Down the Light (2015)	Furling (2023)

Furling is the fifth solo studio album by American folk singer Meg Baird, released on January 27, 2023, through Drag City. Baird co-produced the album with Charlie Saufley, her bandmate in Heron Oblivion. It received acclaim from critics.

== Background ==
Baird co-produced the album with her partner and Heron Oblivion bandmate Charlie Saufley and recorded most of it before March 2020, with the gap between this and its release being credited to "production delays".

== Critical reception ==
Professional ratings
Aggregate scores
Source	Rating
Metacritic	83/100
Review scores
Source	Rating
AllMusic	4/5 stars
Clash	8/10
Mojo	4/5 stars
MusicOMH	3.5/5 stars
The Observer	4/5 stars
Pitchfork	7.5/10
Slant Magazine	3.5/5 stars
Uncut	4.5/5 stars

Furling received a score of 83 out of 100 on review aggregator Metacritic based on 11 critics' reviews, indicating "universal acclaim". Clash's Robin Murray described it as "the work of an artist who thoroughly rewards the listener's patience, an atmospheric yet impeccably detailed selection of haunting songcraft". Mojo wrote that "Furling expands the sonic palette, bringing in piano, percussion, harp, vibraphone and more. The results bring new dimensions to her psychedelic folk". The Wire felt that the album "collates her various sides and strengths into the most complete and resonant recording of her career". Uncut's Sam Richards opined that the album "doesn't attempt to play up its wyrd, mystical qualities. The emotion on display feels very upfront" and Furling has "brought feelings to the surface that previously she may have kept veiled. It feels like a significant breakthrough".

AllMusic's Fred Thomas called it "a self-produced affair on which Baird plays almost every instrument and often tries on styles, sounds, and arrangements that are new to her" as well as "evenly paced and free-flowing throughout". Steven Johnson of MusicOMH stated that "amid the astral and languorous textures there are hints here however at greater depth and more expansive arrangements" than on Furling's previous solo album, Don't Weigh Down the Light (2015). Phil Mongredien of The Observer felt that it was "well worth the long wait, in large part because the realisation of these songs feels more expansive than her earlier, more pared-back work, with Mellotron, synths – even drums – appearing alongside the more familiar acoustic guitar".

Allison Husssey, reviewing the album for Pitchfork, described it as "wistful, heady, and mesmerizing" and wrote that Baird "both expands her palette and distills her multitudes into some of her richest work" as "a wistful mood reigns" on the album. Steve Erickson of Slant Magazine found it to be "very much 'vibes' music, emanating from a wide swath of influences, blending English folk, American roots music, and dubby trip-hop in ways that are both heady and nebulous".

== Track listing ==
All tracks are written by Meg Baird, except "Star Hill Song" and "Will You Follow Me Home?", co-written with Charlie Saufley.

Furling track listing
No.	Title	Length
1.	"Ashes, Ashes"	6:11
2.	"Star Hill Song"	5:57
3.	"Ship Captains"	4:48
4.	"Cross Bay"	5:07
5.	"Twelve Saints"	5:35
6.	"Unnamed Drives"	3:37
7.	"The Saddest Verses"	2:47
8.	"Will You Follow Me Home?"	5:38
9.	"Wreathing Days"	4:02
Total length:		43:42

== Charts ==
Chart performance for Furling
Chart (2023)	Peak position
UK Album Downloads (OCC)	64
UK Independent Albums (OCC)	30
