= Forest (band) =

English band

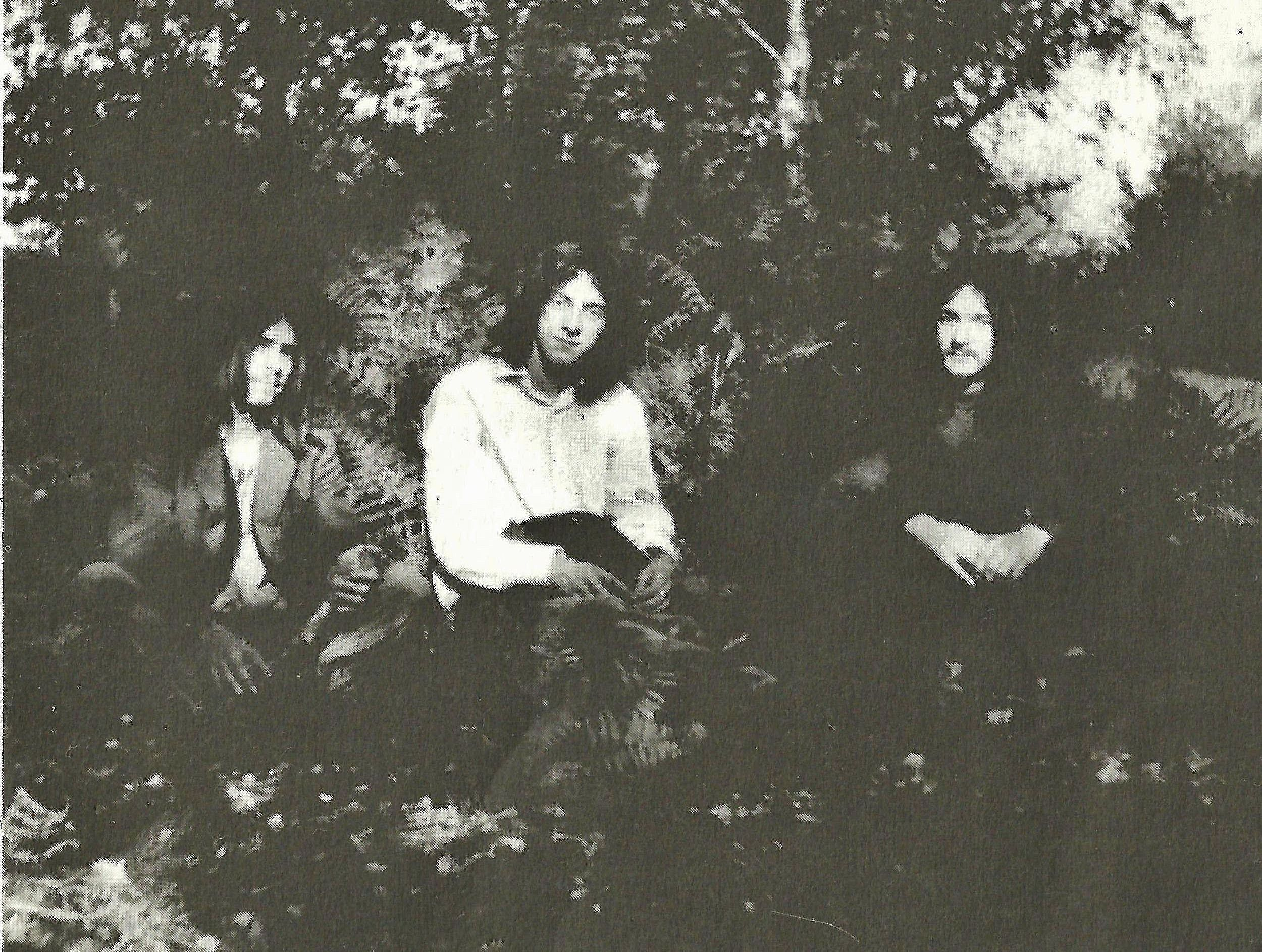
- Forest (left to right): Adrian Welham, Dez Allenby, Martin Welham

Background information
- Also known as: Foresters of Walesby
- Origin: • Grimsby, Lincolnshire, England • Birmingham, England
- Genres: Psychedelic folk, acid folk, progressive folk, acoustic, folk, folk rock
- Years active: 1966–1972
- Label: Harvest Records
- Past members: Martin Welham; Adrian Welham; Dez Allenby; Dave Panton; Dave Stubbs

Forest was an English psychedelic-folk / acid-folk trio who formed in Grimsby, Lincolnshire, England, in 1966. Made up of brothers Martin Welham and Adrian Welham and school friend Dez Allenby, they started out performing unaccompanied traditional folk music in a similar vein to contemporaries The Watersons and The Young Tradition. The band were pioneers of the nascent 1960s underground acoustic-psychedelic/acid-folk scene writing unconventionally crafted songs evoking Britain's ancient groves using a variety of acoustic instruments.

== History ==
Beginning life under the name The Foresters of Walesby, the group began singing unaccompanied vocal harmony folk songs in Lincolnshire folk clubs. After relocating to Birmingham, West Midlands, in 1968, they shortened their name to Forest and soon progressed to writing within the burgeoning psychedelic/acid folk movement in the wake of the Incredible String Band's emergence in the mid-1960s. They were championed by DJ John Peel and performed several sessions for BBC Radio 1.

In 1969, they were signed by Blackhill Enterprises and were amongst the first wave of signings for EMI's new progressive Harvest Records label.

The non-album single "Searching for Shadows" was released in 1969, followed by Forest's debut eponymous album which featured an array of acoustic medieval sounding instruments, contrapunctal harmonies and pastoral lyrical imagery.

Full Circle was released a year later, an eclectic set of songs with dark themes that saw more disparate styles incorporated into their brand of pagan folk, including the neo-classical piece 'Graveyard' and the bleakly baroque "Midnight Hanging of a Runaway Serf". Opening track "Hawk The Hawker" was given a country hint by the inclusion of steel guitar (played by session musician Gordon Huntley) and the traditional folk piece 'Famine Song' saw the band return to their unaccompanied three-part harmony roots. Both gatefold album covers featured strikingly haunting artwork by artist Joan Melville.

Dez Allenby left the band in 1971 and the Welhams drafted in Dave Panton (viola, oboe and saxophone) and Dave Stubbs (bass) for their live work. Forest's final festival appearance was at the 1971 Pinkpop Festival in Geleen, Netherlands, which saw them record their final BBC Radio 1 sessions before disbanding later that year.

The Forest song "A Glade Somewhere" featured on the Harvest Records sampler Picnic - A Breath of Fresh Air in 1970. "Graveyard" was included on the 2004 Castle Records acid-folk compilation Gather in the Mushrooms and the Albion Records collection Strange Folk released in 2006, included the Forest album track "Fading Light".

== Legacy ==
Forest's second album, Full Circle, was one of The Guardian's 1000 albums to hear before you die.

Martin Welham is now one half of psych-folk duo The Story with his son Tom.

Dez Allenby is active playing music in East Yorkshire and beyond.

== Discography ==
=== Albums ===
- Forest (1969)
- Full Circle (1970)

=== Singles ===
- "Searching for Shadows" / "Mirror of Life" (1969)

== See also ==
- List of English people
- List of psychedelic folk artists

== Sources ==
- Young, Rob (2010). Electric Eden. London: Faber and Faber Ltd. ISBN 978-0-571-23752-4.
