= The Weed Tree =

Studio album by Espers
- Released: October 4, 2005
- Genres: Folk, psychedelic folk
- Length: 36:48
- Label: Locust Music

Espers chronology
Espers (2004)	The Weed Tree (2005)	II (2006)

Professional ratings
Review scores
Source	Rating
AllMusic	3.5/5 stars
Pitchfork	7.9/10

The Weed Tree is the second album from Espers, released on Locust Music in 2005. It was, for the most part, a covers album, although it did feature the original song "Dead King". The artists covered were The Durutti Column, Nico, Michael Hurley and Blue Öyster Cult. It also included two traditional songs drawing influence from recordings by Bert Jansch and The Famous Jug Band. The songs were performed in the psychedelic folk style of the band.

== Track listing ==
1. "Rosemary Lane" (traditional; arrangement influenced by Bert Jansch)
2. "Tomorrow" (Vini Reilly; originally by The Durutti Column)
3. "Black Is the Color" (traditional; arrangement influenced by The Famous Jug Band)
4. "Afraid" (Nico)
5. "Blue Mountain" (Michael Hurley)
6. "Flaming Telepaths" (Albert Bouchard, Eric Bloom, Sandy Pearlman, Buck Dharma; originally by Blue Öyster Cult)
7. "Dead King" (Espers original)
