= III (Espers album) =

Studio album by Espers
- Released: October 20, 2009
- Genres: Folk rock, psychedelic rock
- Length: 47:25
- Label: Drag City

Espers chronology
II (2006)	III (2009)

III is Espers' fourth full-length album. It was released on October 20, 2009. The band (known for bleak and melancholic music) has stated in a press release that they've "attempted to create something that would be perhaps cheery at times, though that mark may have been missed".

== Reception ==
Professional ratings
Aggregate scores
Source	Rating
Metacritic	76/100
Review scores
Source	Rating
AllMusic	4.5/5 stars
Drowned in Sound	7/10
Pitchfork	6.1/10

AllMusic's Thom Jurek gave the album a glowing review, concluding that "This band may take their time between releases now, but they get exponentially more sophisticated and adventurous, not only in their composed material, but in their approach to making records."

Uncut's John Mulvey described it as "frequently terrific" but "not quite in the same class as II," its predecessor.

The BBC's David Sheppard gave it a positive review, concluding that "much of this unostentatiously produced album ... could have been recorded at any time during the last 40 years and will probably still beguile four decades hence."

Michael Cramer of Dusted Magazine gave it a mixed review, describing it as an awkward hybrid of the band's first two albums: "In opting for a more concise and song-based approach while largely retaining (if in somewhat attenuated form) the production aesthetic of its predecessor, III occupies an uncomfortable middle ground between II and Espers’s debut, and resultantly is a weaker album than either."

== Track listing ==
1. "I Can't See Clear" - 4:14
2. "The Road of Golden Dust" - 5:07
3. "Caroline" - 3:22
4. "The Pearl" - 4:49
5. "That Which Darkly Thrives" - 5:14
6. "Sightings" - 5:12
7. "Meridian" - 3:13
8. "Another Moon Song" - 6:03
9. "Colony" - 4:18
10. "Trollslända" - 5:53
