= Kandia Crazy Horse =

American singer-songwriter

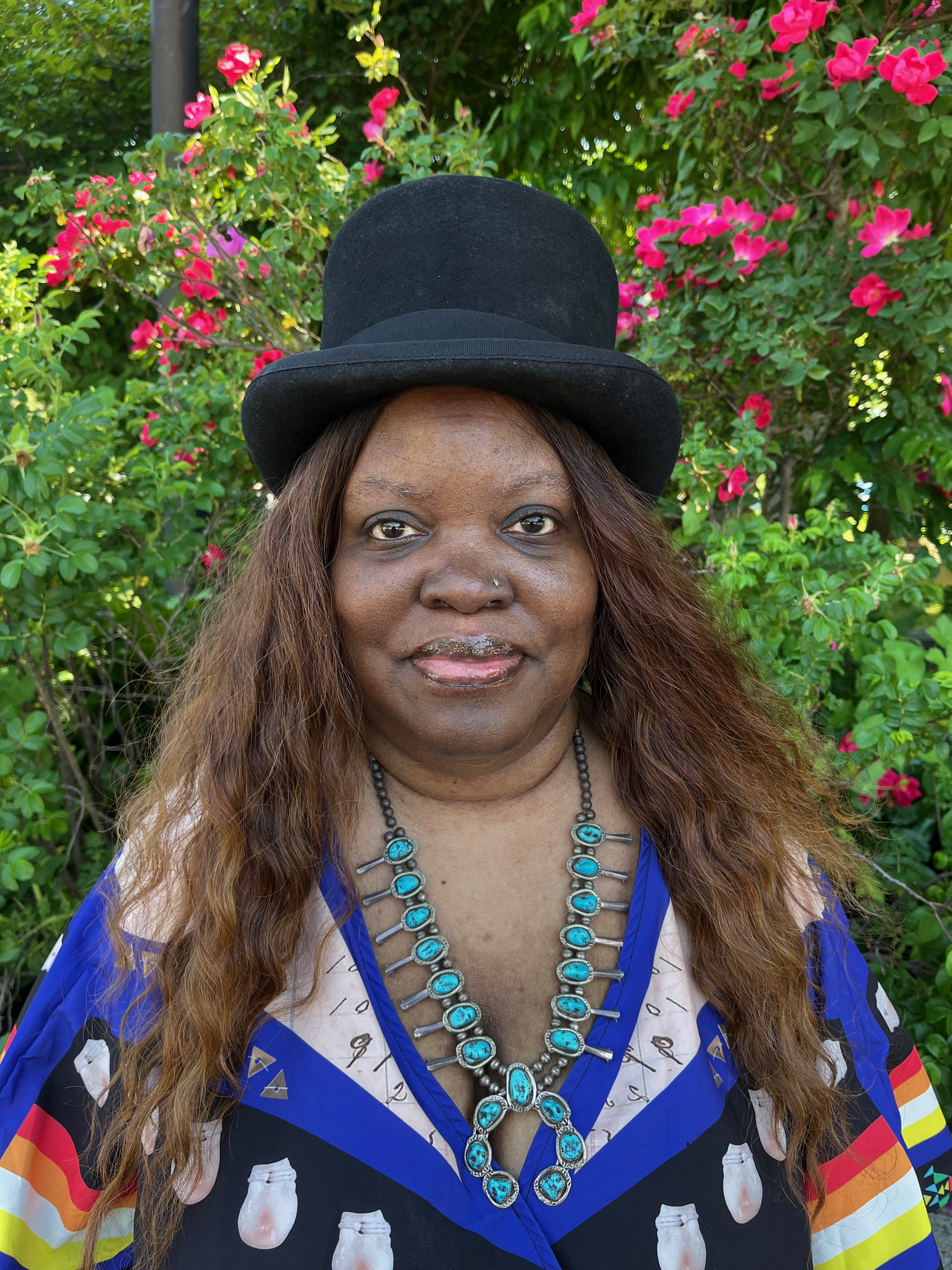

Background information
- Genres: Country music
- Occupations: Musician, journalist and writer
- Years active: 2004–present
- Website: cactusroselovesyou.com

Kandia Crazy Horse is an American country musician, rock critic and writer. She has written for The Village Voice, is the editor of Rip It Up: The Black Experience in Rock 'n' Roll, and also writes for Creative Loafing, and The Guardian. Her country music debut, Stampede, was released in 2013. Crazy Horse is based in New York.

== Career ==
When Crazy Horse began as a music journalist, she states that she was considered a "novelty" because "a black, young female wasn't the picture of a rock critic." Her work as a rock critic is feminist in tone and often focuses on Southern rock. She has also emphasized black contributions to rock music.

Crazy Horse edited Rip It Up: The Black Experience in Rock 'n' Roll (2004). The collection of essays analyzed black figures in rock in order to bring to light the "black experience in rock 'n' roll." Rip It Up describes how black rock isn't considered part of the black music scene and therefore its "impact has been minimized."

She received an Anschutz Distinguished Fellowship in American Studies from Princeton University during 2008 and 2009. While she was a fellow at Princeton, she taught the course "Roll Over Beethoven: Black Rock and Cultural Revolt."

Crazy Horse's debut album, Stampede, contains original songs by Crazy Horse and cover songs. The style of music on the record is traditional country music. Acoustic Guitar called her album "stunning" and a "powerful musical debut." Blurt called her voice "sweet and soulful" and praised her writing that revitalizes familiar country music sounds.
