= Nick Castro =

American folk musician

- Genres: Folk
- Years active: 2002–present
- Labels: Strange Attractors Audio House, Eclipse Records, Daffodelic
- Members: Nick Castro

Nick Castro is a folk, psychedelic folk, traditional and experimental musician and member of the Young Elders.

== Overview ==
Nick Castro was raised in California. His musical training started early although much of his accomplishment was self-taught.

Nick Castro has had three periods now of his brand of acoustic-based musics. Firstly as a solo artist, then with recording ensemble The Poison Tree and currently with touring band The Young Elders. He has toured internationally and recorded with many of the young folk bands which have emerged in the last decades.

Castro has toured, played and collaborated with Feathers and many others.

Nick Castro is also a San Francisco photographer of street life.

== Discography ==
=== Albums and EPs ===
| Year | Title | Format, Special Notes |
|---|---|---|
| 2004 | S/T | CD & LP |
| 2005 | Further From Grace | CD & LP |
| 2006 | Come Into Our House | CD & LP |
| 2007 | A Day Without Disaster | LP |
| 2008 | A Day Without Disaster | CD |
