= Comus (band) =

British progressive folk band

- Comus c. 1971

Background information
- Origin: London, England
- Genres: Progressive folk; freak folk; folk rock; psychedelic folk
- Years active: 1969–1972, 1974, 2008–present
- Labels: Dawn; Virgin Records
- Members: Roger Wootton; Glenn Goring; Andy Hellaby; Colin Pearson; Bobbie Watson; Jon Seagroatt
- Past members: Rob Young; Gordon Caxon; Keith Hale; Lindsay Cooper
- Website: www.comusmusic.co.uk

Comus are a British progressive folk band who had a brief career in the early 1970s. Their first album, First Utterance, garnered them a cult following that persisted. They reunited in 2009, and have played several festivals and released a third album called Out of the Coma.

== History ==
Comus was formed in 1969 by art students Roger Wootton and Glenn Goring, who developed their musical style performing in folk clubs in and around Bromley in Kent. The band was named after Comus (a masque by John Milton), and also after the name of the Greek god Comus. The band grew from an early folk duo to a six-piece ensemble; in that later form, David Bowie came to appreciate them. They appeared regularly at his Arts Lab project in Beckenham, Kent. He also invited them to be his support act in a 1969 concert at London's Purcell Rooms.

Their first album, First Utterance, with cover art by Wootton and Goring, appeared in 1971. The music is largely acoustic music that blends elements of Eastern percussion, early folk and animal-like vocals. The lyrics involve violence, murder, mental disorder and the mystical. Tiny Mix Tapes rated First Utterance five stars out of five.

After the album, woodwind player Rob Young was replaced by Lindsay Cooper, and the new lineup developed material for a never-released second album. No recording by this lineup would see the light of day for another 40 years. The group disbanded for a time, but Wootton, Andy Hellaby and Bobbie Watson reformed the band with new members for their second album, To Keep from Crying, in 1974.

A complete box set was released in 2005; this features both studio albums, their only single, "Diana", and a previously unreleased track called "All the Colours of Darkness". The liner notes feature an exclusive interview with some members of the band. They reformed for the Mellotronen Festival in Sweden in March 2008. They have continued to perform occasional gigs, including some new material.

On 13 June 2009, Comus performed for the first time in the UK in 37 years, at the Equinox Festival at Conway Hall.

A reunion album, Out of the Coma, was released in June 2012. It contains three new tracks: "Out of the Coma", "The Sacrifice" (both written by Wootton) and "The Return" (written by Goring), plus a 1972 live recording of unfinished material from their abandoned follow-up to First Utterance, "The Malgaard Suite". Sputnik Music rated Out of the Coma 3.5 out of 5. Louder Sound rated it four stars out of five.

The members were active outside Comus. Wootton also appears on some recordings by Slapp Happy. Cooper went on to join Henry Cow. Reed player Jon Seagroatt is also a member of free-improvising trio Red Square. Colin Pearson went on to produce hits for other artists, including "Forever Young" for Alphaville. Seagroatt and singer Bobbie Watson married in 2003.

== Influence ==
In 1998, Opeth singer and songwriter Mikael Åkerfeldt used part of a sentence from "Drip Drip" for the title of the album My Arms, Your Hearse. The full line was "As I carry you to your grave, my arms your hearse".

The song "Moonlapse Vertigo" from Still Life contains the lyric "Across the leafy pathway," which was taken from Comus' "Diana."

Another nod to Comus was given on the 2005 Opeth album Ghost Reveries. The second track, "The Baying of the Hounds", was derived from a line in the song "Diana" which reads, "And she knows by the sound of the baying, by the baying of the hounds".

English experimental band Current 93 covered the song "Diana" from First Utterance on their studio album Horsey. Musically, this version differs considerably from the original, with David Tibet singing the lyrics in an agonized fashion and constructing most of the song from a loop based around a vertiginous violin arrangement from the original.

Nero’s Day at Disneyland, a band created by Lauren Bousfield active from 2005-2011 whose genre can be described as experimental, electronic or breakcore, sampled the song “Diana” by Comus in one of their most popular songs, “Sprawling Idiot Effigy”. The verse reads: “Lust cries running with his eyes, the white clad figure fleeting. Mud burns in his eyes, but desire burns his mind” is the only intelligible lyrics of the song, which appears in Nero’s Day at Disneyland’s album, “From Rotting Fantasylands”.

== Personnel ==
Current members

- Roger Wootton – acoustic guitar, lead vocals (1969–1972, 1974, 2008–present)
- Glenn Goring – acoustic and electric guitars, slide guitar, hand drums, backing vocals (1969–72, 2008–present)
- Andy Hellaby – bass guitar, slide bass, backing vocals (1969–1972, 1974, 2008–present)
- Colin Pearson – violin, viola (1969–72, 2008–present)
- Bobbie Watson – lead and backing vocals, percussion (1969–1972, 1974, 2008–present)
- Jon Seagroatt – flute, oboe, hand drums (2008–present)

Former members

- Rob Young – flute, oboe, hand drums (1969–71)
- Gordon Coxon – drums (1974)
- Keith Hale – keyboards (1974)
- Lindsay Cooper – bassoon (1972, 1974)

== Discography ==
Studio albums

- First Utterance (1971)
- To Keep from Crying (1974)
- Out of the Coma (2012)

Live albums

- East of Sweden: Live at Melloboat Festival 2008 (2011)
- Out of the Coma (2012) recorded 1972

Box sets

- Song to Comus: The Complete Collection (2005)

EPs

- "Diana / In the Lost Queen's Eyes / Winter is a Coloured Bird" (1971)

Roger Wootton solo single

- "Fiesta Fandango" / "New Tide"
