= Locust Music =

Locust Music was a Chicago-based independent record label operated by Dawson Prater. It was active by 2001, when it reissued Michael Hurley's 1964 debut album as Blueberry Wine.

The label's early catalog combined reissues of recordings by Hurley, Henry Flynt, and Allen Ginsberg with newly recorded experimental music. Prater also curated the Object series, in which musicians interpreted inanimate objects, and the Met Life series, which paired urban field recordings with musical responses.

Locust released records through 2011 and was defunct by 2015.

== See also ==
- List of record labels
