= Espers (band) =

American band

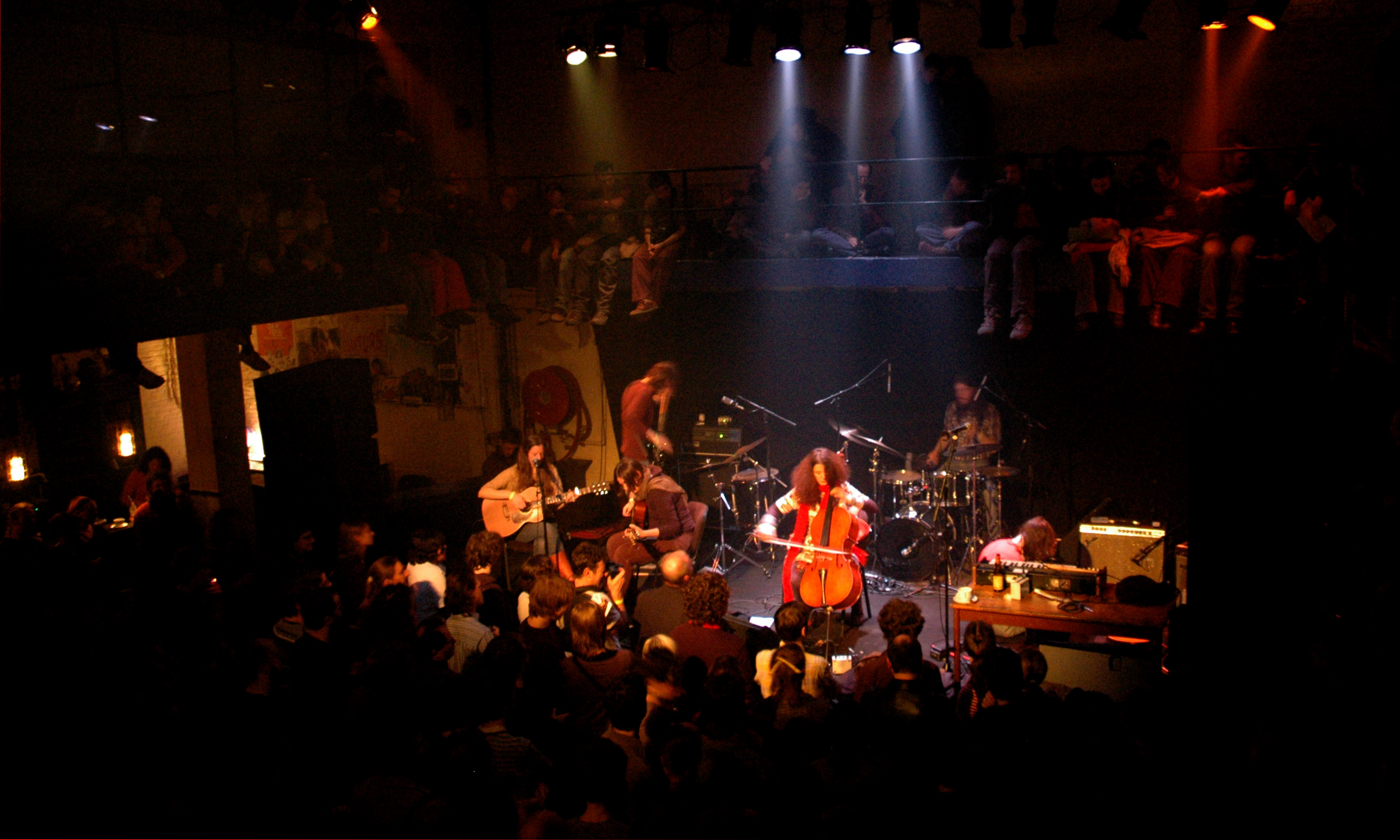
- Espers performing in 2006

Background information
- Origin: Philadelphia, United States
- Genres: Drone, folk, psychedelic, rock
- Years active: 2002-2010, 2018
- Labels: Locust Music, Drag City
- Past members: Meg Baird; Helena Espvall; Norman Fetter; Otto Hauser; John Heron; Ben McConnell; Brooke Sietinsons; Chris Smith; Greg Weeks

Espers were an American psychedelic folk band from Philadelphia. Formed in 2002 as a trio of singer-songwriter Greg Weeks, Meg Baird and Brooke Sietinsons as part of the then-emerging indie folk scene, Espers later expanded to a sextet that included Otto Hauser, Helena Espvall and Chris Smith.

Espers released their self-titled debut album in 2004 on Time-Lag Records and followed that with an album of cover songs, The Weed Tree, in 2005. This release featured the band's versions of songs by artists as diverse as Nico, The Durutti Column, and Blue Öyster Cult. In 2006 the band released their second album of original material, II on Drag City Records. Their final album, III, was released in October 2009.

The band reunited for a trio of performances in 2018 and considered writing new material but decided against it. Their first two albums were reissued by Drag City in 2020.

== Discography ==
=== Albums ===
- Espers (2004)
- The Weed Tree (2005)
- II (2006)
- III (2009)

=== Singles ===
- "Riding" / "Under The Waterfall" (7") (2005)
