= II (Espers album) =

Studio album by Espers
- Released: May 16, 2006
- Recorded: October–December 2005, Hexham Head Sound Laboratories, Philadelphia, PA
- Genres: Folk, psychedelic folk
- Length: 50:01
- Label: Drag City
- Producer: Greg Weeks

Espers chronology
The Weed Tree (2005)	II (2006)	III (2009)

Professional ratings
Aggregate scores
Source	Rating
Metacritic	79/100
Review scores
Source	Rating
AllMusic	4.5/5 stars
Dusted Magazine	(mixed)
The Guardian	4/5 stars
The Independent	4/5 stars
MusicOMH	2/5 stars
The New York Times	(positive)
Pitchfork	(7.9/10)
Stylus Magazine	(A−)
The Village Voice	(mixed)
Yahoo! Music	6/10 stars

II is the third album from the band Espers. It was their first to be released on Drag City. The song "Children of Stone" was later covered by Marianne Faithfull on her 2008 album Easy Come, Easy Go. The song 'Mansfield And Cyclops' was also included in The Amorphous Androgynous' A Monstrous Psychedelic Bubble Vol 1 - Cosmic Space Music in the same year.

== Track listing ==
1. "Dead Queen" – 8:13
2. "Widow's Weed" – 6:51
3. "Cruel Storm" – 5:17
4. "Children of Stone" – 8:54
5. "Mansfield and Cyclops" – 5:57
6. "Dead King" – 8:02
7. "Moon Occults the Sun" – 6:47
