= Progressive folk =

Music genre

- Stylistic origins: Traditional folk; contemporary folk; world
- Cultural origins: 1930s, United States
- Derivative forms: Folk baroque; country folk

Other topics
- Folk punk; folk rock; indie folk; neofolk; psychedelic folk; progressive country; progressive rock

Progressive folk is a style of contemporary folk that adds new layers of musical and lyrical complexity, often incorporating various ethnic influences.

== History ==
=== Origins of the term ===
The original meaning of progressive folk came from its links to the progressive politics of the American folk revival of the 1930s, particularly through the work of musicologist Charles Seeger. Key figures in the development of progressive folk in America were Pete Seeger and Woody Guthrie, who influenced figures such as Bob Dylan and Joan Baez in the 1960s. All mixed progressive political messages with traditional folk music tunes and themes.

In Britain, one of the major strands that emerged from the short-lived skiffle craze of 1956–9 were acoustic artists who performed American progressive material. Vital in the development of progressive folk was the emergence of the American counterculture and British underground scenes of the mid-1960s. The term progressive began to be used by radio stations to describe psychedelic music, including pop, rock and folk, that emerged from this scene.

=== Psychedelic folk ===
The first musical use of the term psychedelic is thought to have been by the New York–based folk group The Holy Modal Rounders on their version of 'Hesitation Blues', a popular blues standard, in 1964. Psychedelic music spread rapidly in the beat folk scenes of both the east and west coast of the mid-1960s. Los Angeles and San Francisco produced bands such as Kaleidoscope, The Peanut Butter Conspiracy, The Beau Brummels, and It’s A Beautiful Day. From New York city's Greenwich Village came groups such as Jake and the Family Jewels and Cat Mother & the All Night Newsboys. Chicago's major contribution was H. P. Lovecraft. Many of these psychedelic folk groups followed the Byrds into folk rock from 1965, are now as a result more widely remembered, including Jefferson Airplane, Grateful Dead and Quicksilver Messenger Service.

From the mid-1960s, partly as a result of the British Invasion, this trend ran in parallel in both America and Britain and as part of the inter-related folk, folk rock and rock scenes. Folk artists who were particularly significant included the Scottish performers Donovan, who combined influences of American artists like Bob Dylan with references to flower power, and the Incredible String Band, who from 1967 incorporated a range of influences into their acoustic based music, including medieval and eastern instruments. There was a brief flowering of British and Irish progressive folk in the late 1960s and early 1970s, with groups like the Third Ear Band and Quintessence following the eastern Indian musical and more abstract work by groups such as Comus, Dando Shaft, Trees, Spirogyra, Forest, and Jan Dukes De Grey.

=== Folk baroque ===
The situation in Britain was made more complex by the second folk revival, which created a network of folk clubs across the country, mostly in urban centres, from the late 1950s. In the early 1960s much of the music performed in these venues was American traditional and progressive folk, but this was increasingly discouraged from the mid-1960s as British traditional music began to dominate 'policy clubs'. Most psychedelic folk artists, particularly in London, relied more heavily on coffee houses and clubs like UFO and Middle Earth as their venues, but a number of artists occupied a musical territory between traditional and progressive music. This was particularly notable with artists like Davy Graham, Martin Carthy, Bert Jansch and John Renbourn, who fused various styles of American music with English folk to create a distinctive form of fingerstyle guitar playing known as 'folk baroque'. Using medieval, jazz and blues elements in their playing, this was an overt attempt to push British folk music into new territory, and can be seen as a forerunner of progressive rock. Perhaps the finest individual work in the genre was from early 1970s artists like Nick Drake, Tim Buckley and John Martyn.

=== Country folk ===
Country folk emerged as a hybrid subgenre of progressive folk and country after Dylan's visit to Nashville to record Blonde on Blonde in 1966. Developing as a gentler form of country with more emphasis on song writing, it continued some of the political traditions of progressive folk, being taken up in the 1970s by artists such as John Denver and Emmylou Harris and more recently contributing to the development of the progressive country subgenre.

=== Decline ===
In the early 1970s, psychedelia began to fall out of fashion and those folk groups that had not already moved into different areas had largely disbanded. Although artists like Dylan and Baez continued their careers with considerable success in the 1970s as American folk music began to fragment with groups focusing on areas such as blues, bluegrass and oldtime, progressive folk began to disappear as a term and its major themes shifted into 'contemporary folk', focusing on new singer-songwriters using the coffee-house circuit, including such artists as Chris Castle, Steve Goodman, and John Prine.

In Britain, folk groups also tended to electrify, as did acoustic duo Tyrannosaurus Rex, which became the electric combo T. Rex. This was a continuation of a process by which progressive folk had considerable impact on mainstream rock. Others, probably influenced by the British folk rock pioneered by Fairport Convention and Steeleye Span from 1969, moved towards more traditional material, a category including Dando Shaft, Amazing Blondel, and Jack the Lad, an offshoot of northern progressive folk group Lindisfarne. Examples of bands that remained firmly on the border between progressive folk and progressive rock were the short lived (but later reunited) Comus and, more successfully, Renaissance, who combined folk and rock with classical elements. In the early 2010s, the band Moulettes was one of the most prominent progressive folk artists in the United Kingdom.

== See also ==
- Progressive bluegrass
- Indie folk
- Progressive country
