= Fugs 4, Rounders Score =

Album by The Fugs

Studio album by The Fugs, The Holy Modal Rounders
- Released: 1975
- Recorded: 1965
- Genre: Rock and roll; garage rock; proto-punk; folk rock; psychedelic folk
- Label: ESP-Disk
- Producer: Ed Sanders, Harry Smith, Richard Alderson

The Fugs, The Holy Modal Rounders chronology
Virgin Fugs (1967)	Fugs 4, Rounders Score (1975)

Professional ratings
Review scores
Source	Rating
Christgau's Record Guide	B+

Fugs 4, Rounders Score is a 1975 compilation album of material by The Fugs and The Holy Modal Rounders, including seven previously unreleased performances from the Fugs' first recording session (April 1965), when the Rounders (Peter Stampfel and Steve Weber) were members of the Fugs' band. The title is both a reference to Abraham Lincoln's Gettysburg Address ("Four score and seven years ago...), and the fact that this is the fourth album of Fugs material released on ESP, as well as a pun on "score" as drug slang. Although all recordings were made under the umbrella of the Fugs, the 6 lead vocals by Stampfel and Weber on Side A allow the album to function as a Rounders compilation as well. There is a notable and unusual lack of lead vocalizing by Ed Sanders, the most prominent vocalist on all other Fugs albums.

The LP was released on ESP Disc (ESP 2018), probably without the foreknowledge or permission of the musicians.

One of the previously unreleased tracks ("Defeated") was later re-released as a bonus track on the CD version of The Village Fugs.

== Track listing ==
Side one

1. "Boobs a Lot" (Steve Weber) – 2:13
2. "Romping Through The Swamp" (Peter Stampfel) – 2:32
3. "Defeated" (Kupferberg) – 2:30
4. "Crowley Waltz" (Traditional) – 1:42
5. "Fiddler a Dram" (Traditional) – 2:32
6. "Fishing Blues" (Traditional) – 1:56
7. "New Amphetamine Shriek (Stampfel) – 2:24
8. "Jackoff Blues" (Kupferberg) – 1:52

Side two

1. "I Couldn't Get High" (Ken Weaver) – 2:01
2. "Slum Goddess" (Weaver) – 1:55
3. "Caca Rocka" (Kupferberg) – 1:30
4. "CIA Man" (Kupferberg) – 2:48
5. "Kill for Peace" (Tuli Kupferberg) – 2:07
6. "Morning, Morning" (Kupferberg) – 2:07
7. "Virgin Forest Excerpt" (Alderson, Crabtree, Sanders) – 5:23

Tracks 2, 3, 4, 5, 6, 7 and 8 on side A: recorded April 1965, and previously unreleased.
Tracks 1 on side A and track 1, 2 on side B from The Fugs First Album.
Tracks 3 and 4 on side B from Virgin Fugs. (Note: Cover notes notwithstanding, it is an alternate take of A7 that appears on Virgin Fugs.)
Tracks 5, 6, 7, side B From The Fugs.

Tracks 2, 4, 5 and 6 on side A feature only Stampfel and Weber.
Track 1 and 7 on side A feature lead vocals by Weber and/or Stampfel, making them arguably Holy Modal Rounders recordings as well as Fugs recordings.

== Personnel ==
=== Performance ===
- Ed Sanders – vocals
- Tuli Kupferberg – percussion, vocals
- Ken Weaver – conga, drums, vocals
- Steve Weber – guitar, vocals
- Peter Stampfel – fiddle, harmonica, vocals
- Vinny Leary – bass, guitar, vocals
- John Anderson – bass guitar, vocals
- Lee Crabtree – piano, celeste, bells
- Pete Kearney – guitar
- Betsy Klein (?) – vocals

=== Production ===
- Ed Sanders – producer,
- Harry Smith – producer
- Richard Alderson, Engineer

== Additional sources ==
- The Fugs Store: The Fugs First Album
