= It Crawled into My Hand, Honest =

Studio album by the Fugs
- Released: 1968
- Recorded: 1968
- Genres: Psychedelic rock; sound collage
- Length: 35:03
- Labels: Reprise (US); Transatlantic (UK)
- Producers: Ed Sanders, Richard Alderson

The Fugs chronology
Tenderness Junction (1968)	It Crawled into My Hand, Honest (1968)	The Belle of Avenue A (1969)

Professional ratings
Review scores
Source	Rating
AllMusic	3/5 stars
Rolling Stone	(positive)

It Crawled into My Hand, Honest is the fifth studio album by the Fugs, a band composed of anti-war poets. It was released in the US by record company Reprise.

== History ==
When poet and publisher Ed Sanders established a bookstore next to the apartment of beat poet and publisher Tuli Kupferberg in 1964, the two decided to form a band, The Fugs, writing 50–60 songs between them prior to asking Ken Weaver to join. In subsequent years, this core trio worked with a number of musicians as they produced a series of albums in quick succession. It crawled... was their fifth studio album.

The band built up a cult following, gaining admiration from counter-culture figures such as William S. Burroughs and Abbie Hoffman. They were known especially for their pro-drugs, anti-war stance, use of poetry in their music, and large number of sexual references in their songs.

Due to their overt sexual content, The Fugs were at risk of censorship. However, while on Reprise Records, the company president Mo Ostin showed a willingness to release Fugs material uncensored. This era of freedom began with the release of the album Tenderness Junction, released in early 1968. Work on It crawled.. began straight after.

The album was The Fugs' most expensive, costing around $25,000.

== Musical style ==
In 1967, The Fugs' sound had developed considerably from their early works such as The Fugs First Album, with several complex and interesting compositions. This was partly due to personnel changes; Charles Larkey, an excellent bassist, and Ken Pine, a skilled guitarist were added in 1967 and played on both this and the preceding album Tenderness Junction. Session musicians also added to the depth of the work; Band leader Sanders later stated:

For back-up harmonies, we used some fine singers who had worked as Harry Belafonte's harmonists. You can hear them, say, on "Wide, Wide River," and "When the Mode of the Music Changes".

Described as "ambitious and extravagant sounding", It Crawled Into My Hand, Honest takes the form of a sound collage with tracks linked by snippets of chants, prayers and exorcisms. Kris Needs of Record Collector describes the album as a "total collage assault". Chuck Foster of The Big Takeover highlights the eclectic nature of the first side of the album, veering between psychedelic rock, country, blues and easy listening, while drawing attention to the "strange sound collage of songs and vocal snippets" that forms the second side. Sanders said he intended the second side of the album be a "like a long collage". Richie Unterberger said that the integration of a "side-long suite" was comparable to the Mothers of Invention's We're Only in It for the Money and the Holy Modal Rounders' The Moray Eels Eat the Holy Modal Rounders, both also from 1968. Writing for AllMusic, he similarly said that the album begins with "five discrete tracks" before moving into a "cut-and-paste of tracks varying in length from three seconds to four minutes, the stylistic jump-cuts similar to those employed by the Mothers of Invention in the same era."

Among the diverse styles explored on the album include satirical country music ("Ramses II Is Dead My Love"), grandiose classical music ("Burial Waltz"), comedic gospel ("Wide Wide River"), folk rock ("Life Is Strange") and Gregorian chant ("Marijuana"), with choral backing vocals throughout. As with Tenderness Junction, the album begins with a psychedelic rock track, "Crystal Liaison". The love song, which has been compared to the Bonzo Doo Dah Dog Band, was released as a single. The album also introduces Sanders' redneck character Johnny Pissoff, who represented a musical style described by Sanders as "beatnik country"; another example of the Fugs working in the genre is "We Don't Allow No Robots in Sunday School". One track recites the word "marijuana" in the style of a Catholic Latin hymn. There were some discarded songs, including "Beautyway", a lengthy song written with composer Burton Green that was named for a Navajo advert, and "The Vision of William Blake's Garden". A lengthy, intricate piece named "Magic Rite" was recorded earlier in 1968 for the album but only appeared in snippet form, under the name "Irene (Peace)".

The Fugs also introduced the use of a pair of drummers at this period: founder member Ken Weaver plus new recruit Bob Mason. Despite the changes, the underlying approach of The Fugs remained irreverent and humorous. The album featured a high number of short tracks, many included for their comic value, such as "National Haiku Contest", a teenager's surreal haiku in response to an unwanted pregnancy, and "Robinson Crusoe" a sketch on sexual frustration featuring Robinson Crusoe and Man Friday. In supporting tours, founding band member Kupferberg used a wide range of unusual costumes, and punctuated performances with wild dances and witty satiric routines. Political and social commentary also remained highly prominent, with tracks such as the pro-drugs eulogy "Marijuana", the redneck satire "Johnny Pissoff Meets the Red Angel", and the pro-peace chant "Irene".

== Track listing ==
Side A

1. Crystal Liaison [3:17]
2. Ramses II Is Dead, My Love [2:55]
3. Burial Waltz [2:31]
4. Wide, Wide River [2:58]
5. Life Is Strange [2:40]

Side B

1. Johnny Pissoff Meets the Red Angel [4:45]
2. Marijuana [1:43]
3. Leprechaun [0:15]
4. When the Mode of the Music Changes [3:59]
5. Whimpers From the Jello [0:24]
6. Divine Toe, Pt. 1 [0:42]
7. We're Both Dead Now, Alice [0:18]
8. Life Is Funny [0:17]
9. Grope Need, Pt. 1/Tuli, Visited By the Ghost of Plotinus/More Grope Need [0:43]
10. Robinson Crusoe [0:21]
11. Claude Pelieu and J.J. Lebel Discuss the Early Verlaine Bread Crust Fragments [4:41]
12. National Haiku Contest [0:28]
13. Divine Toe, Pt. 2 [0:52]
14. Irene [1:14]

== Personnel ==
- Ed Sanders – vocals
- Ken Weaver – drums, vocals
- Tuli Kupferberg – vocals
- Ken Pine – guitar, vocals
- Danny Kootch – guitar, violin
- Charles Larkey – bass

Produced by Richard Alderson
