= Tenderness Junction =

Studio album by the Fugs
- Released: 1968
- Recorded: 1967
- Genre: Psychedelic rock; folk rock
- Label: Reprise (US); Transatlantic (UK)
- Producer: Ed Sanders, Richard Alderson

The Fugs chronology
Virgin Fugs (1967)	Tenderness Junction (1968)	It Crawled into My Hand, Honest (1968)

Professional ratings
Review scores
Source	Rating
Rolling Stone	(negative)

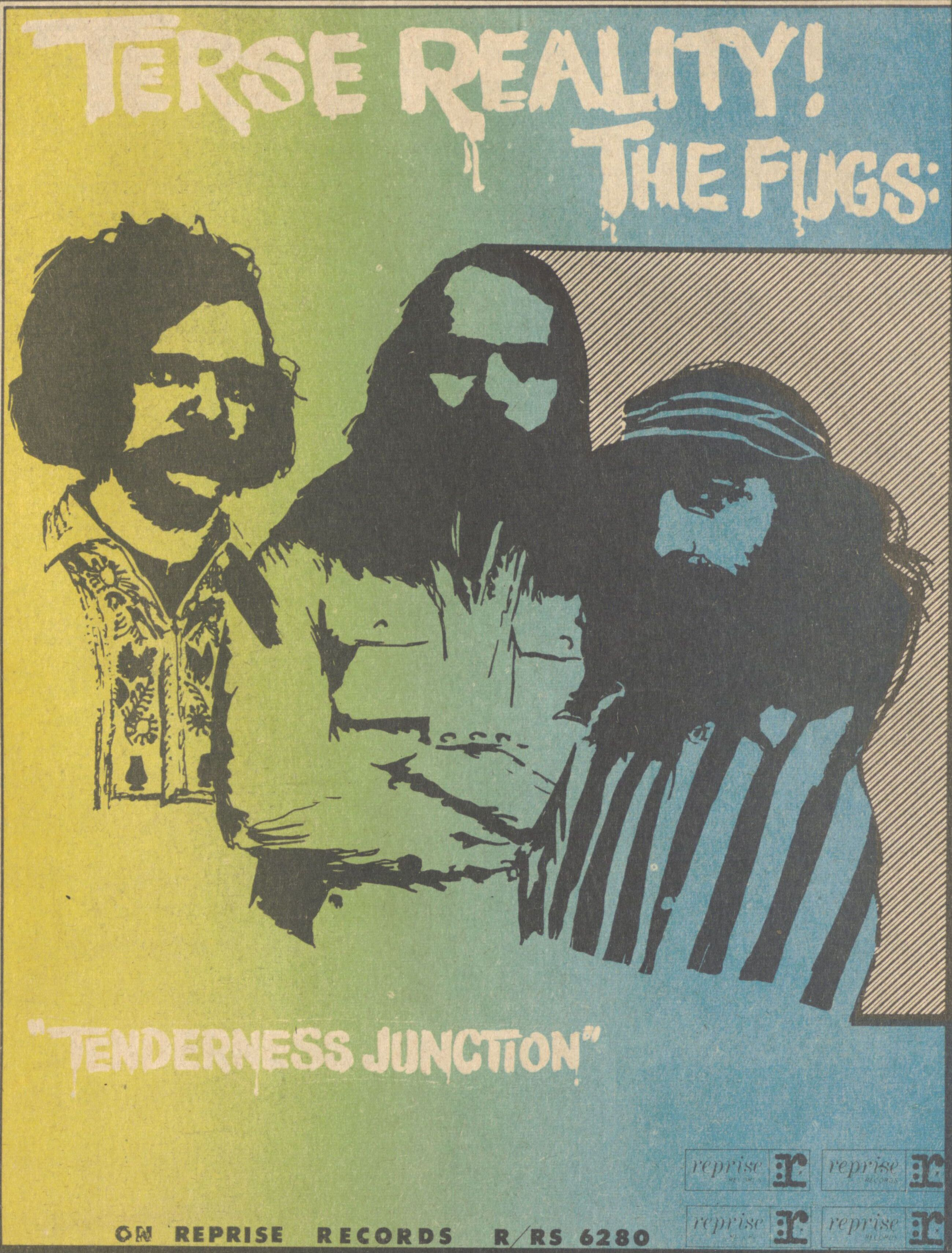
Ad for Tenderness Junction in the Seattle underground paper Helix

Tenderness Junction is the fourth studio album of the Fugs, formed in 1964 by anti-war musician/poets Ed Sanders, Tuli Kupferberg and Ken Weaver. It was released in the US by record company Reprise. A stand-alone CD was released by Wounded Bird Records in 2011, before which the entire album had appeared on the 2006 3-CD Rhino Handmade box set, Electromagnetic Steamboat.

== History ==
As the 1960s progressed, the band's core of Sanders, Kupferberg, and Weaver continued to write the Fugs' songs, but were supplemented by increasingly accomplished musicians. Tenderness Junction was their fourth studio album.

The band built up a cult following, gaining admiration from counterculture figures such as William S. Burroughs and Abbie Hoffman. They were known especially for their pro-drugs, anti-war stance, use of poetry in their music, and large number of sexual references in their songs.

Due to their overt sexual content, The Fugs were at risk of censorship. They were released by Atlantic Records in 1967, but signed by Reprise in 1968. Some of the later tracks recorded for Atlantic appear on Tenderness Junction. While on Reprise Records, the company president Mo Ostin showed a willingness to release Fugs material uncensored.

== Musical style ==
In 1967 The Fugs' sound had developed considerably from their early works such as The Fugs First Album, with several complex and interesting compositions. The band was growing in confidence, and their recordings began to feature guest performers, most notably poets Allen Ginsberg and Gregory Corso, and sitar player Jake Jacobs.

The main band had grown to six in number, with Sanders, Kupferberg and Weaver being joined by Ken Pine on guitar, Danny "Kootch" Kortchmar on guitar and violin, and Charles Larkey on bass.

The album featured a newly focused rock sound, while the underlying approach of The Fugs remained irreverent and humorous. Themes of sexual freedom, social protest and general surreal humour abound. "Turn on, Tune in, Drop out" was a psychedelic rock gem, very much in tune with the times, while "Wet Dream" is a musical parody of Platters-style teenage love songs, with the usual romantic notions replaced by a fantasy about the "queen of the prom" sitting on the throne (and "sitting on my face").

Despite the increased musical skill of The Fugs during this period, there are many wild and obscure moments, most notably "Exorcising the Evil Spirits from the Pentagon Oct. 21, 1967", a recording of an anti-war protest at The Pentagon where protesters including The Fugs chanted 'Out Demons Out' and had a love-in, plus the long and experimental "Aphrodite Mass".

== Reaction ==
Tenderness... was described by the Robert Shelton of the New York Times as the band's "most musical work yet" as he commented favourably on their power and honesty:

[T]he Fugs are ready to do battle in the commercial marketplace with their anti-commercial rants, their satirical slashes that draw blood, their Lenny Bruce-isms that hit the conventional middle-class right between its myopic, suburban eyes.

== Track listing ==
1. "Turn on, Tune in, Drop Out" 4:49
2. "Knock Knock" 4:28
3. "Garden Is Open" 6:22
4. "Wet Dream" 3:27
5. "Hare Krishna" 3:26
6. "Exorcising the Evil Spirits from the Pentagon Oct. 21, 1967" 3:25
7. "War Song" 5:37
8. "Dover Beach" 4:08
9. "Fingers of the Sun" 2:26
10. "Aphrodite Mass: I. Litany of the Street Grope"
11. "Aphrodite Mass: II. Genuflection at the Temple of Squack"
12. "Aphrodite Mass: III. Petals in the Sea"
13. "Aphrodite Mass: IV. Sappho's Hymn to Aphrodite"
14. "Aphrodite Mass: V. Homage to Throb Thrills"

== Personnel ==
- Tuli Kupferberg – vocals, erectorine
- Ed Sanders – vocals
- Ken Pine – guitar, harmonica, organ, oscillator, vocals
- Danny Kootch – guitar, violin, percussion, vocals
- Charles Larkey – bass
- Ken Weaver – drums, vocals
