= Virgin Fugs =

Studio album by the Fugs
- Released: 1967
- Recorded: 1965
- Genre: Folk rock; contemporary folk
- Label: ESP-Disk
- Producer: Ed Sanders, Harry Smith

The Fugs chronology
The Fugs (1966)	Virgin Fugs (1967)	Tenderness Junction (1968)

Virgin Fugs is a 1967 album by the Fugs. While it is their third released album, it consists of outtakes from the two 1965 sessions for their first album, The Village Fugs (also released as The Fugs First Album). While that album emphasized the second recording session, this compilation favors the first, making this arguably their chronologically "real first" album. It was released on ESP Disc (ESP 1038), possibly without the foreknowledge or permission of the Fugs. Their site refers to it as a bootleg, though it was distributed through the same channels as their authorized previous ESP album. ESP followed this release with a 1975 compilation including seven more outtakes from these sessions, Fugs 4, Rounders Score.

Original copies of this ESP-Disk LP contained a bumper sticker which read "FUG-CUE"

Four tracks from Virgin Fugs were released as bonus tracks on the CD version of The Fugs First Album.

Bob Dylan featured and writes about "C.I.A. Man" in his book "The Philosophy of Modern Song".

== Track listing ==
Side one

1. "We're the Fugs" (Ed Sanders) – 1:09A ^
2. "New Amphetamine Shriek" (Peter Stampfel) – 2:18
3. "Saran Wrap" (Sanders) – 1:12
4. "The Ten Commandments" (Tuli Kupferberg and GOD) – 2:50 ^
5. "Hallucination Horrors" (Kupferberg) – 2:03
6. "I Command the House of the Devil" (Sanders) – 3:22

Side two

1. "C.I.A. Man" (Kupferberg) – 2:48 ^
2. "Coca Cola Douche" (Kupferberg) – 1:35
3. "My Bed Is Getting Crowded" (Kupferberg) – 2:30
4. "Caca Rocka" (Kupferberg) – 1:30
5. "I Saw the Best Minds of My Generation Rot" (Allen Ginsberg, Sanders) – 4:43 ^

^ Tracks A1, A4, B1, B5 released as bonus tracks on The Fugs First Album CD.

== Personnel ==
=== Performance ===
- Ed Sanders – vocals, percussion
- Tuli Kupferberg – vocals, percussion
- Peter Stampfel – fiddle, harmonica, guitar, banjo, vocals
- Steve Weber – guitar, vocals
- Vinny Leary – guitar, vocals
- Lee Crabtree – keyboards, percussion, vocals
- John Anderson – bass guitar, vocals
- Ken Weaver – drums, vocals

=== Production ===
- Ed Sanders – producer,
- Harry Smith – producer

== Additional sources ==
- The Fugs Store: The Fugs First Album
