= The Belle of Avenue A =

Studio album by the Fugs
- Released: 1969
- Recorded: 1968
- Studio: Apostolic (New York)
- Genre: Psychedelic rock; folk rock; psychedelic folk
- Label: Reprise
- Producer: Ed Sanders, Richard Alderson

The Fugs chronology
It Crawled into My Hand, Honest (1968)	''The Belle of Avenue A'' (1969)	Golden Filth (1970)

The Belle Of Avenue A is a 1969 studio album by the Fugs, a band composed of anti-war poets. It was released in the US by record company Reprise. The album was first released on CD as part of the 2006 3-CD box set, Electromagnetic Steamboat, and eventually as a stand-alone CD in 2011 on the Wounded Bird label (WOU 6539).

== Background ==
The Fugs recorded The Belle of Avenue A at Apostolic Studios in New York City. The band would split up after its recording, as they had tired of the police and FBI investigations they had received.

The album contains much more restrained and straightforward rock music than its predecessor, It Crawled into My Hand, Honest. The vocals demonstrate Ed Sanders's growing country music influence, and tracks such as "Yodeling Yippie" have been likened to "beatnik country."

== Track listing ==
1. "Bum's Song"
2. "Dust Devil"
3. "Chicago"
4. "Four Minutes to Twelve"
5. "Mr. Mack"
6. "Belle of Avenue A"
7. "Queen of the Nile"
8. "Flower Children"
9. "Yodeling Yippie"
10. "Children of the Dream"

== Personnel ==
- Tuli Kupferberg – vocals
- Ed Sanders – vocals
- Ken Weaver – drums, vocals
- Dan Hamburg (tracks 1, 6, 7 & 9), Ken Pine (tracks 2–5, 8 & 10) – guitar, vocals
- Jim Pepper – flute (track 8)
- Bill Wolf – bass, vocals (tracks 2–5, 8 & 10)
- Bob Mason – drums (tracks 2–5, 8 & 10)

== Critical reception ==
Billboard praised the album upon release: "The irrepressible Fugs have their most commercial album to date here, but they're still the biting social commentators."
