= Ah! Sun-flower =

Illustrated poem by William Blake

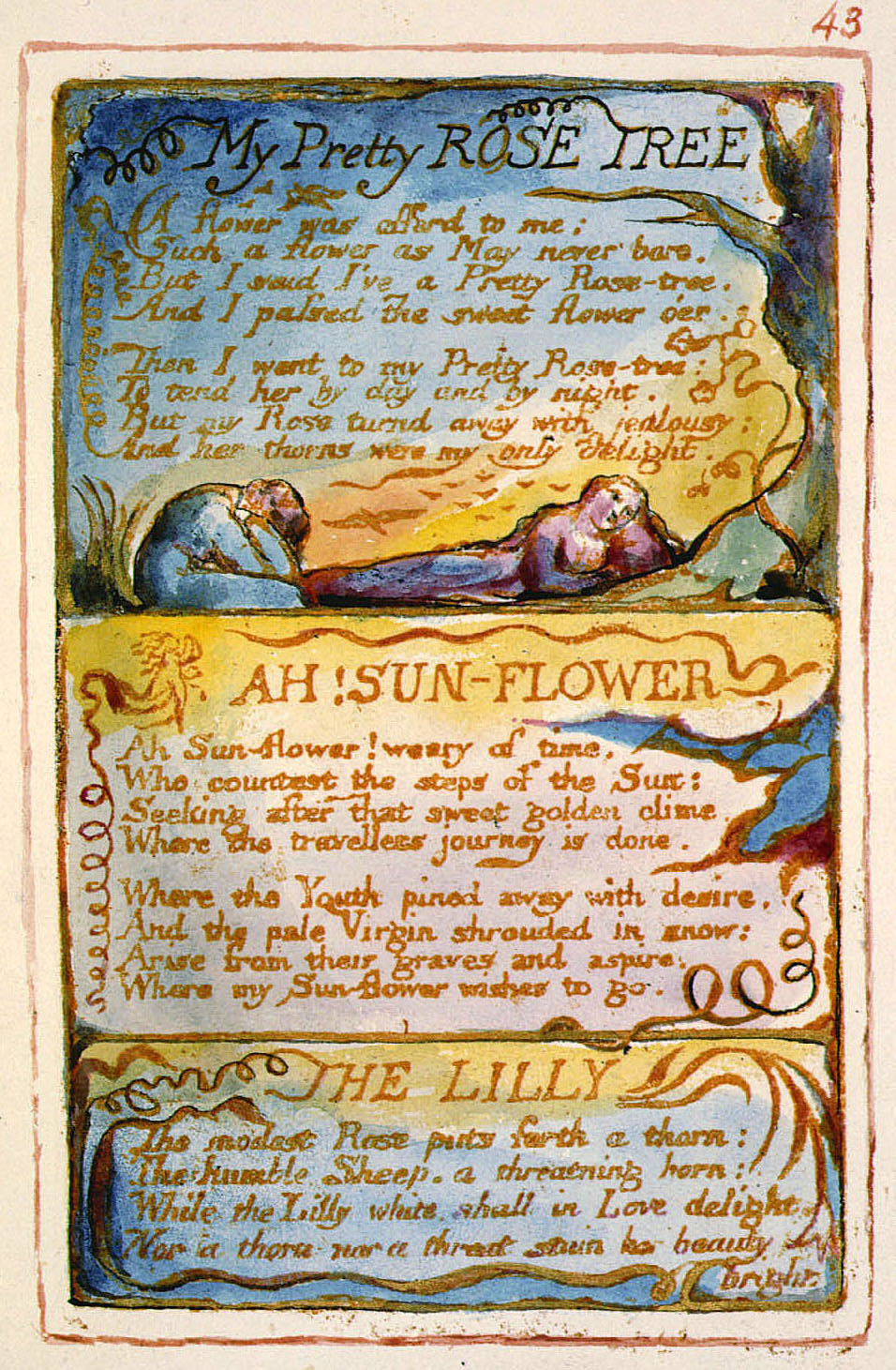
Copy AA of Blake's engraving of the poem in Songs of Experience. This copy is currently held by the Fitzwilliam Museum

"Ah! Sun-flower" is an illustrated poem written by the English poet, painter and printmaker William Blake. It was published as part of his collection Songs of Experience in 1794 (no.43 in the sequence of the combined book, Songs of Innocence and of Experience). It is one of only four poems in Songs of Experience not found in the "Notebook" (the Rossetti MS).

== The poem ==
Ah Sun-flower! weary of time,
Who countest the steps of the Sun:
Seeking after that sweet golden clime
Where the travellers journey is done.

Where the Youth pined away with desire,
And the pale Virgin shrouded in snow:
Arise from their graves and aspire,
Where my Sun-flower wishes to go.

== Poetic structure and tone ==
The poem consists of eight lines, in two quatrains.

The metre is largely one of anapaestic trimeter with an admix of initial iambs and trochees to break up the rather monotonous rhythm that the anapaestic line confers. Thus Blake is able to show the cyclical monotony that the protagonists are suffering, while at the same time giving a forward note of impetus and hope to the movement of the lines.

The rhyme scheme is ABAB CDCD; all the rhymes are masculine.

The ambiguous use of the word "Ah," (a note of delight, surprise, pity?) and the repetition of the word "where" are noteworthy - these are discussed by Grant; the disturbance of the anapaestic rhythm in line three by Edwards.

"The speaker begins with a sigh that suggests the same weariness that he attributes to the Sunflower (a suggestion emphasized by the heavy stresses in the song). The wistful tone and the implied sympathy for the time-bound victims are disarming. But, as many critics have noted, the poem is not without irony...the sense of timeless rest is soon complicated by the ambiguous syntax." Indeed, Bloom goes so far as to say that "the lyric's tone can be characterized as a kind of apocalyptic sardonicism."

== Technique ==
The printmaking technique used for the whole page is relief etching, with pen and watercolour, touched with gold.

The dimensions of the printed impression, including all three poems (see illustration), are: 14 cm x 9.4 cm (based on the King's College, Cambridge, copy - copy "W"). (See the external link at the bottom of this page for a comparison, provided by the William Blake Archive, of 13 versions of the design. Size and colouring varies across the different copies.)

The "Ah, Sun-flower" design forms the middle part of the overall layout (the positioning is mentioned below in the "Themes and interpretations" section).

"The text and title appear in a cloud (which...may indicate the speaker's confusion)."

A "tiny golden human form of the Sunflower, with petal-like arm, root-like leg, and hair flowing back" appears in the top-left, but, other than a blue patch of sky at the top-right, there seems to be little direct connection with the poem. Grant discusses the illustration in some detail. Leader points to the unbridgeable distance between the Sunflower and the blue space as being illustrative of unfulfilled aspiration.

== Themes and interpretations ==
=== General ===
There are many interpretations of this deceptively slight, but well-known, poem and artwork : Kozlowski provides a summary of academic thought on the work up to 1981. Grant gives the most comprehensive overview of the poem.

Northrop Frye believed that the "merging of imagination and time is the axis on which all Blake's thought turns.""Ah! Sun-flower" (with its constrictions of space-time and its hint at creative, energetic imagination as a potential way out) seems to be an example of this dialectic, as the various responses of critics outlined below show. Another key to Blake's thought mentioned by Frye is that for "Blake,...the fall of man" (see:Fall of Man) "and the creation of the physical world were the same event." The world we see and live in is therefore a "fallen" natural world (a world of "Generation") in which, since "God is Man", humans are "miserable in the state of nature."

The poem has three main (ambiguous) elements of interest: the "sweet, golden clime," the Sunflower, and the Youth and Virgin. The poem's ambiguities concerning the speaker's (not necessarily Blake's) stance on the attainability or otherwise, and on the nature, of the "sweet golden clime" (the West, Heaven, Eden?), have led to different, sometimes conflicting views of the poem. Leader notes the "critical controversy surrounding 'Ah! Sun-flower' and 'The Lilly'...", but thinks that the ambiguities are part of Blake's deliberate strategy - perhaps to put doubts in our minds about the speaker of the poem (whom Leader calls "the Bard"). He says: "...our inability to accept either a pessimistic-sardonic reading of the sort advocated by Bloom or Wagenknecht (one in which the 'poem's sweet golden clime' is an illusion, and 'aspire' means 'fail to attain'), or a more straightforward, unironic interpretation such as Hirsch's, again seems part of a larger plan." (See below for these critics' thoughts).

In the discussion that follows, it is worth bearing in mind Leader's reminder that Blake did not have a fixed system of symbolism. "Many of the plants, flowers, birds and beasts in Songs are iconographic in nature, but their meanings, whether traditional or not, change and develop from plate to plate."

=== Sun-flower and other flowers ===
The Sunflower itself could be a literary symbol that could be interpreted in myriad ways. It could be representative of a "fallen" human, as above, or persistent love; frustrated or corrupted love; lost innocence; the poetic imagination; spiritual yearning; or a combination of any of these.

==== Persistent and frustrated love ====
The poem may allude to the myth of Clytie and Helios (as described in Ovid's Metamorphoses). Clytie, a girl or nymph, was in love with Helios, the Sun god, who in turn was in love with Leucothoe (or Leucothea). Helios and Leucothoe met in secret, but Clytie, possessed by jealousy, betrayed the lovers and Leucothoe was killed by her angry father. As a result, Helios scorned Clytie, who, still a virgin, pined away, went mad, sat rooted to the ground and turned (i.e.: metamorphosed) into a Heliotropium, condemned, or fated, by her love, to always turn her face to the Sun as it/he moves across the sky. Often in modern retellings the heliotropium is supplanted for the sunflower (note that, in actuality, there is no evidence for Sunflower heliotropism. See: Heliotropism misconception).

The Sunflower (originally the Heliotrope), ever since the myth of Clytie, has "been an emblem of the faithful subject". It has been an emblem of this in three or four ways: 1) the "image of a soul devoted to the god or God, originally a Platonic concept" (see below); 2) "an image of the Virgin devoted to Christ"; or 3) "an image - in the strictly Ovidian sense - of the lover devoted to the beloved". (The authors of these quotes have pointed out that it has also stood as an emblem for the art of painting). The speaker's personification of an inanimate flower suggests that the soul (a word to be used with caution in Blake) or lover, (options 1 or 3 in the list above), or both, is intended.

==== Lost innocence ====
If Blake had the Clytie myth in mind, then the Sunflower would be a symbol of lost innocence (or experience lacking the necessary mix of innocence), while the two human figures are symbols of lack of experience (or innocence lacking the necessary mix of experience). Bloom points out that "Blake does not prefer Innocence or Experience" and that, "without the simultaneous presence of both states, human existence would cease." The "two contrary states of the human soul" (the sub-title of the Songs of Innocence and of Experience) are therefore being explored in this small poem.

The link to the Clytie myth also points to two other major themes that run throughout the Songs of Experience and which feature in "Ah! Sun-flower" in particular: "the blighting effect victimization has on victimizers as well as victims"; and "problems...about transcendence versus transformation...".

==== Corrupted love ====
Keith, as well as suggesting a tie to the myth of Clytie, also points to that of Narcissus (to be found, amongst other ancient sources, in the Metamorphoses of Ovid, like the Clytie tale). The Narcissus story tells of love corrupted by inward-looking selfishness, rather than by jealousy. It may be no accident that the Youth in the poem has connections to flower-imagery (the Narcissus being the Wild Daffodil).

Magnus Ankarskjö believes that, in Blake's "fallen" world of experience, all love is enchained. So "Ah, Sun-flower", as well as the Clytie myth, (where physical change follows upon a moral one), may be illustrative of divine, innocent love, corrupted and enslaved by human nature - through the experience of possessive jealousy and also, perhaps, defensive self-denial. The positioning of this poem after that of "My Pretty Rose Tree", a poem suggestive of love corrupted by (undeserved?) jealousy, and before that of "The Lilly", which might advocate an open, pure, if not innocent, love, free of possessive defences, could support this interpretation.

==== Poetic imagination ====
Grant and Antal both discuss Blake's use of flower imagery: particularly his anthropomorphic use of the Rose and the Lilly. Antal says: "In his Songs of Experience Blake relies on the rich symbolism of the rose and the lily so as to find his central flower-figure in the 'spiritual' Sunflower." Grant thinks that "in the Songs of Experience, flowers represent different aspects of love." Also, in noting the positioning of the three flower poems on one plate, he believes that,"as a group, the poems evidently present a threefold vision of love...earthly love, poetic love and Human love." There may well be a movement from the innocence of the Songs of Innocence (what Blake called "unorganized", i.e.: ignorant innocence), on to the tragic and fateful desire of earthly love ("My Pretty Rose Tree"), and then through to the pure, divinely human love of "The Lilly" via the creative, poetic imagination of "Ah! Sun-flower". "Here in his Songs sexual desire is shown sinful, but only experience can lead man to insight, only through experience man is able to reach a higher state of innocence", (what Blake called "organized innocence.")

==== Spiritual yearning ====
George Mills Harper suggests that the impetus for Blake's creation of "Ah! Sun-flower" came from his reading of Thomas Taylor's introduction to and translation of The Hymns of Orpheus (1792). Through the words of Plotinus, everything in the universe participates in the "first good", symbolized by the Sun. Blake said that "every natural effect has a spiritual cause": the Sunflower's apparent following of the movement of the Sun is not just a natural effect, but is also the result of divine nature attracting the souls of plants and, as with the Youth and Virgin, human beings. For Taylor and Blake (who may have known Taylor as well as read him), material life is like a prison: the Sunflower and the humans, who are literally and figuratively rooted to and buried within the materialistic earth, wish to escape to divine eternity.

In addition, in the context of Blake's poem, the Sunflower may "represent" the Church of England (corrupted, repressive and earthbound in Blake's view); or the yearning of the human spirit for the liberty of Eternity; or a child of God whose desire, unlike the earthly frustrations of the Youth and Virgin, leads to heaven.

=== Youth and Virgin ===
The two human figures also seem to be symbols of something and much of what the critics have said about them might also apply to the Sunflower. They are dead, unlike the Sunflower, and yet have the same aspirations towards what might be the "unfallen world, called Paradise in the Bible and the Golden Age in the Classics."

==== Frustrated desire or aspiration ====
However, rather than a desire for Heaven, the poem may be a meditation on (frustrated) desire or aspiration itself. Perhaps the figures of the Youth and Virgin depict repressed morality, as suggested by Harold Bloom. "The Youth and the Virgin have denied their sexuality to win the allegorical abode of the conventionally visualized heaven", he says. Arriving there, they find themselves "merely at the sunset." The lovers "trap themselves in the limitations of the natural world by refusing the generative aspects of their state." (See article on generation). Their "minds are bound as the Sunflower is literally bound." Bloom also read the poem as saying that "to aspire only as the vegetative world aspires is to suffer a metamorphosis into the vegetative existence". Ryan says that "the premium placed on virginity seemed to him [i.e.: Blake] particularly wrongheaded and he showed his disdain for it on many occasions...and offered no consolation to the 'Youth pined away with desire,/ And the pale Virgin shrouded in snow' (E25) who remain unfulfilled even after their repressed lives are over.""The 'sweet, golden clime', then, "can be seen as a symptom of repressed desire rather than an alternative to it," says Lincoln, who also thinks that "like the youth and maiden, the speaker may be a victim of frustration"(the speaker might possess "my Sun-flower" who "wishes to go.")

Keith, meanwhile, as well as linking the Youth to the Narcissus myth, points to the Persephone, (also known as Proserpina) myth, as applicable to the Virgin character, where the "soul's descent into the material world of generation" leads to a yearning to escape. He points to a connection between Persephone, who might have been gathering Daffodils (confused with the Asphodel in English tradition), before being taken under the Earth by Pluto. When Persephone was captured, the Daffodils, originally white in colour, turned yellow. So, the 'shrouded in snow' phrase may refer to the "coldness and frigidity of the situation in which she is trapped"; to the white flowers that covered her head as she was being dragged off; to the covering of snow on the ground during Winter prior to the re-appearance of the flowers. The aspiration of whiteness towards 'golden' yellowness is also in play here.

==== Lack of creative energy ====
A theme related to this concerns creative energy (both generative and imaginative). Or, rather, the lack of creative energy that is depicted in the poem - both visually and aurally. Bloom, referring to Blake's The Marriage of Heaven and Hell, says that "the Human, standing still, becomes the wholly natural", and is, quoting Blake, "unable to do other than to repeat the same dull round over again" (just like the Sunflower). Only when the "contraries" (including "Reason and Energy") in the human condition are married together in "creative strife", will a way out of repeating the same dull round over again (towards "Eden") be found. (Keith points to the repetition of the word 'sunflower' in the first and last lines. He says that this "helps to draw attention to the fact that no progression is made in the course of the poem at all.")

==== Misplaced asceticism ====
Others also think that maybe the two humans are symbols of misplaced asceticism - perhaps as much "conceptual and imaginative" as "actual denial of the flesh." It is quite possible that Blake is criticizing the New Testament view of a life of self-denial: the stinting of earthly desires in order to gain entrance to an after-life of bliss. The Sunflower, the Youth and the Virgin may be all mis-spending their lives, instead of living them in the here and now (what Blake called the "eternal Now").

Johnson discusses emblem collections (in particular, those of Otto van Veen) in which the Clytie myth (see above) features, as a background to Blake's work. She believes that the speaker of the poem knows that the "sweet golden clime" that the Sunflower yearns for "is known to be a land of eternal aspiration, not of fulfillment, where even the resurrected dead who have never found "Eternity's sunrise" in the present moment continue to "aspire."" Blake is emphasizing, she thinks, "that aspiration itself (if it is present-hating and future-loving) is a form of confinement". For Johnson, Blake is turning the emblem convention around and criticizing the "frustrated desire, deferred pleasure, and preoccupation with the hereafter that rack the characters" in his poem.

==== Spiritual yearning ====
Or, again, as Kremen suggests, perhaps he is pitting the Christian notion of the resurrection (free of generation) against "the prophetic regeneration within Nature". Hirsch says that the poem depicts how the "longing for Eternity does not belong to the special province of the Christian imagination but is grounded in nature itself--in the Sunflower as well as in Man". However, Hirsch sees a "spiritual balance" in the poem - "to seek the golden clime beyond is also to follow the golden sun here and now." The Youth and Virgin both desire each other (in an earthly way) and aspire (in a heavenly one).

=== Towards the "sweet golden clime"? ===
==== Spiritual transformation ====
The poem is set after two events : the metamorphosis of the Sunflower, and the deaths of the two humans. It may be argued, as by Antal that, despite these constrictive transformations, the soul, or love, remains or persists. This, again, might be an echoing of Ovid. That is, his use of the Pythagorean view that, although everything else changes, the individual soul is unchanged until, perhaps, it undergoes the supreme transformation that Blake (and St. Paul) hints at. That is, the soul "might ultimately shake off the body altogether... and attain the final bliss of losing itself in the universal, eternal and divine soul to which by its own nature it belonged."

Antal notes that, "besides the Ovidian references, the poem has strong spiritual connotations," and that the "possibility of an afterlife" is being held out. She also points out that "in Metamorphoses the source of the transformed figures is always an outside divinity while Blake internalises it, emphasising that the source of spiritual transformation should be looked [for] and found inside man."

==== Natural and moral law questions ====
The Sunflower, the "hot" Youth and the emotionally "frozen" Virgin, might, then, (assuming a reading contrary to the one of Bloom, Johnson and others), be finally free to love in Heaven or Eden. Or, at least, they might be finally free of the shackles of natural law that afflict the world- and time-weary Sunflower and the Moral Law that afflicts the humans. (See: moral absolutism and religion). Blake regarded natural desire as "vegetated", like the Sunflower - the word "vegetated" being used by Blake "in other contexts to mean "bound by natural law"". Such a reading would refer to Blake's possible notions of free love, breaking earthbound (both natural and societal) conventions (see: William Blake#Sexuality), and/or refer to ideas of generative, divine sex.

These two constrictive laws (natural and moral) are linked. In the fourfold levels of imagination in which Blake believed, the Sunflower is currently living in the second state - what Frye describes as "a double world of subject and object, of organism and environment, which Blake calls Generation." Only "plants are completely adjusted to this world," and above it lies the "imaginative world." With "sexual love... we may proceed up a ladder of love" (clime/climb?) "to an imaginative awakening..." which will "...lift us from a world of subject and object to a world of lover and beloved." This, in turn, will lead the lovers to the triple "world of lover, beloved and mutual creation; the father the mother and the child." The fourth and final stage is the one of Eden, of "unified imagination." The critics seem to be unsure as to whether it is too late or not for the Sunflower, Youth and Virgin to achieve this goal. As Keith says, " it is possible to read the poem as confident and optimistic or, on the contrary, as pessimistic and even hopeless." He adds that, perhaps, "a full response to the poem will be able to hold both possibilities in suspension"

== Influence on artists ==
The British painter Paul Nash, influenced by Blake, painted a series of Sunflower works towards the end of his life: Sunflower and Sun (1942), Solstice of the Sunflower (1945) and Eclipse of the Sunflower (1945). Nash apparently referred specifically to "Ah! Sun-flower" and felt an affinity with what he thought was the Sunflower's seemingly imminent death (like his own).

Allen Ginsberg was one of the poets who admired this poem. In 1948 he had the hallucinatory experience of hearing Blake reading "Ah, Sun-flower" and two other works (see Allen Ginsberg: the Blake vision). Ginsberg wrote his own "Sunflower sutra" in 1955, descriptive, perhaps, of love persisting amidst moral and physical devastation. He also regularly performed readings of the poem.

As befits a song, there have been many musical settings of "Ah! Sun-flower". The following are the most notable.

Ralph Vaughan Williams included "Ah! Sun-flower" in his 1958 song cycle Ten Blake Songs.

Benjamin Britten's song cycle Songs and Proverbs of William Blake (1965) includes a setting of "Ah! Sun-flower".

Ed Sanders of The Fugs set the poem to music and recorded it on The Fugs First Album in 1965.

For the passing of the 2nd millennium, British composer Jonathan Dove set the text of "Ah, Sun-flower" and two other poems by Blake ("Invocation" and "The Narrow Bud Opens Her Beauties To The Sun") in his piece The Passing of the Year (2000), a song cycle for double chorus and piano.

In 2002, the Canadian sisters Kate and Anna McGarrigle wanted to record Ed Sanders' setting in French; they asked Philippe Tatartcheff to translate the poem, only to find the words no longer scanned with the tune. So they composed a new tune which accommodated both languages. That appeared the following year on their album La vache qui pleure in both English and French recordings.
