= The Fugs (album) =

Studio album by the Fugs
- Released: March 1966
- Recorded: 1966
- Genres: Garage rock; psychedelic rock
- Length: 35:24
- Label: ESP-Disk
- Producers: Ed Sanders, Richard Alderson

The Fugs chronology
| The Fugs First Album (1965) | The Fugs (1966) | Virgin Fugs (1967) |

Singles from The Fugs
- 1. "Frenzy" / "I Want to Know" Released: March 1966; 2. "Kill for Peace" / "Morning, Morning" Released: 3 March 1966

The Fugs is the second studio album by American rock band the Fugs. The album charted number 95 on Billboard's "Top Pop Albums" chart. The album was re-released on CD in 1993 as The Fugs Second Album on the Fantasy label with five additional tracks: two live performances and three tracks recorded for Atlantic in 1967 for an album that was never released.

== Background ==
After the release of their first album on Folkways Records, the Fugs signed a contract allowing ESP-Disk to publish its material in exchange for usage of an Off-Broadway theater as practice space and what Fugs' frontman Ed Sanders describes as "one of the lower percentages in the history of western civilization." While finding the contract binding and disadvantageous in many ways, the Fugs were pleased with the opportunity to work with and at the studio of Richard Alderson, who allowed them to experiment with his state-of-the-art equipment.

== Recording and production ==
The album was produced over a four-week period through January and February 1966 at the same time that the band was performing weekly at the Astor Place Playhouse and making television appearances with David Susskind's Open End talk show. They were interviewed by Jean Kennedy, which led to an appearance of the band at one of the upcoming episodes of Open End a week later.

The band's controversial lyrics and stage antics allegedly attracted the attention of the FBI and New York City fire and building inspectors and eventually resulted in their being banned from Astor Place Playhouse. According to Sanders, the FBI's final report of its investigation of the band concluded that "The Fugs is a group of musicians who perform in NYC. They are considered to be beatniks and free thinkers, i.e., free love, free use of narcotics, etc. .... it is recommended that this case be placed in a closed status since the recording is not considered to be obscene." Sanders jokes that "If we'd only known about this, we could have put a disclaimer on the record, 'Ruled NOT obscene by the FBI!'"

== Critical reception and legacy ==
Professional ratings
Review scores
| Source | Rating |
|---|---|
| Allmusic | 4.5/5 stars |

In its review of the re-release, AllMusic finds them "very ahead of their time lyrically" and compares them to the punk band Dead Kennedys, both lyrically and in their shared "weakness for crude humor".

In 2003, David Bowie included it in a list of 25 of his favourite albums.

== Track listing ==
Side A
| No. | Title | Writer(s) | Length |
|---|---|---|---|
| 1. | "Frenzy" | Ed Sanders | 2:00 |
| 2. | "I Want to Know" | Charles Olson, Sanders | 2:00 |
| 3. | "Skin Flowers" | Pete Kearney, Sanders | 2:00 |
| 4. | "Group Grope" | Sanders | 3:40 |
| 5. | "Coming Down" | Sanders | 3:46 |
| 6. | "Dirty Old Man" | Lionel Goldbart, Sanders | 2:49 |

Side B
| No. | Title | Writer(s) | Length |
|---|---|---|---|
| 1. | "Kill for Peace" | Tuli Kupferberg | 2:07 |
| 2. | "Morning, Morning" | Kupferberg | 2:07 |
| 3. | "Doin' All Right" | Richard Alderson, Ted Berrigan, Lee Crabtree | 2:37 |
| 4. | "Virgin Forest" | Alderson, Berrigan, Crabtree | 11:17 |
| Total length: | | | 34:55 |

CD bonus tracks
| No. | Title | Writer(s) | Length |
|---|---|---|---|
| 13. | "I Want to Know" (live) | Olson, Sanders | 2:57 |
| 14. | "Mutant Stomp" (live) | Sanders | 2:13 |
| 15. | "Carpe Diem" | Kupferberg | 2:45 |
| 16. | "Wide, Wide River" | Goldbart, Ken Weaver | 3:25 |
| 17. | "Nameless Voices Crying for Kindness" | Sanders |
| Total length: | | | 50:29 |

== Personnel ==
=== Performance ===
- John Anderson – bass guitar, vocals
- Lee Crabtree – piano, celeste, bells
- Pete Kearney – guitar
- Betsy Klein – vocals
- Tuli Kupferberg – maracas, tambourine, vocals
- Vinny Leary – bass, guitar
- Ed Sanders – vocals
- Ken Weaver – conga, drums, vocals

=== Production ===
- Richard Alderson – engineer
- Bill Beckman – cover design
- Allen Ginsberg – liner notes
- Jim Nelson – photography
