= The Fugs First Album =

Studio album by the Fugs
- Released: 1965
- Recorded: April – September 1965
- Genres: Folk rock; garage rock
- Length: 27:33
- Labels: Folkways; ESP-Disk
- Producers: Ed Sanders, Harry Smith

The Fugs chronology
The Fugs First Album (1965)	The Fugs (1966)

The Fugs First Album (also known as The Village Fugs) is the 1965 debut album by American rock band the Fugs, described in their AllMusic profile as "arguably the first underground rock group of all time". In 1965, the album charted #142 on Billboard's "Top Pop Albums" chart.

In 1969, the FBI opened an investigation on the Fugs after a broadcasting executive flagged this album and Virgin Fugs as "the filthiest and most vulgar thing the human mind could possibly conceive". The case was eventually dropped.

The album was originally released in 1965 as The Village Fugs Sing Ballads of Contemporary Protest, Point of Views, and General Dissatisfaction on Folkways Records before the band signed up with ESP-Disk, who released the album under its own label with a new name in 1966. The album was re-released in 1993 on CD with an additional 11 tracks.

In 2017, Pitchfork ranked the album number 155 on their list of "The 200 Best Albums of the 1960s".

== Background ==
When poet and publisher Ed Sanders established a bookstore next to the apartment of beat poet and publisher Tuli Kupferberg in 1963, the two decided to form a band, the Fugs, writing 50-60 songs between them prior to asking Ken Weaver to join. The trio invited Steve Weber and Peter Stampfel of the band Holy Modal Rounders to perform with them at the February 1965 grand opening of Sanders' bookstore. Sanders describes the event as heavily attended, with William S. Burroughs, George Plimpton and James Michener among the luminaries in attendance. Harry Everett Smith, producer of the famous Anthology of American Folk Music, persuaded Folkways Records to issue the Fugs' first album. Following recording sessions in April and September 1965, the album The Village Fugs—Ballads and Songs of Contemporary Protest, Points of View and General Dissatisfaction was released in late 1965 (Broadside BR 304; also listed with a related Folkways serial number, FW 05304, though it is unclear whether this is a separate pressing/edition). Following a nationwide tour, the Fugs signed a contract with ESP-Disk, who re-released the album in 1966 (ESP-1018), in both mono and stereo, with some changed edits and one substituted take (see below).

== Critical reception ==
Professional ratings
Review scores
Source	Rating
AllMusic	3/5 stars
Robert Christgau	A−

In 1969, the album was referenced several times in an FBI file on the Doors, due to an employee at the Jefferson Standard Broadcasting Company suggesting to North Carolina senator Sam Ervin that he investigate the band after hearing copies of The Fugs First Album and Virgin Fugs, an excerpt labels the group as being "the filthiest and most vulgar thing the human mind could possibly conceive". The FBI received copies of Virgin Fugs as well as their debut and placed both of them under investigation whilst they considered prosecuting the Fugs for obscenity, the plans were later dropped as they were advised by Stephen B. Kaufman that it was not a "good vehicle for prosecution".

In 2017, Pitchfork ranked the album number 155 on their list of "The 200 Best Albums of the 1960s".

== Track listing ==
Sing Ballads of Contemporary Protest, Point of Views, and General Dissatisfaction (1965 Broadside Records version)

Side one
No.	Title	Writer(s)	Length
1.	"Slum Goddess"	Ken Weaver	1:58
2.	"Ah, Sunflower, Weary of Time"	William Blake, Ed Sanders	2:15
3.	"Supergirl"	Tuli Kupferberg	2:18
4.	"Swinburne Stomp"	Sanders, A.C. Swinburne	2:50
5.	"I Couldn't Get High"	Weaver	2:06

Side two
No.	Title	Writer(s)	Length
1.	"How Sweet I Roamed"	Blake, Sanders	2:11
2.	"Carpe Diem"	Kupferberg	5:07
3.	"I Feel Like Homemade Shit"	Sanders	2:18
4.	"Boobs a Lot"	Steve Weber	2:12
5.	"Nothing"	Kupferberg	4:18
Total length:			27:33

The Fugs First Album (1966 ESP Disk version)

Same as 1965 version, but the song "My Baby Done Left Me" was renamed "I Feel Like Homemade Shit".

The Fugs First Album with Sizzling Additional Tracks from The Early Fugs (1994 CD version)

Additional Studio Material
No.	Title	Writer(s)	Length
11.	"We're the Fugs"	Sanders	1:25
12.	"Defeated"	Kupferberg	3:25
13.	"The Ten Commandments"	Kupferberg	2:59
14.	"CIA Man"	Kupferberg	2:52
15.	"In the Middle of Their First Recording Session the Fugs Sign the Worst Record Contract Since Leadbelly's"	Petito, Sanders	2:49
16.	"I Saw the Best Minds of My Generation Rock"	Ginsberg, Sanders	4:51
17.	"Spontaneous Salute to Andy Warhol (From Rehearsal at the Peace Eye Bookstore)"	Sanders	1:23

Songs From the "Night Of Napalm" – Live at the Bridge Theater, St. Marks Place, 1965
No.	Title	Writer(s)	Length
18.	"War Kills Babies"	Kupferberg	1:41
19.	"The Fugs National Anthem"	Kupferberg, Sanders	1:16
20.	"The Fugs Spaghetti Death (No Redemption No Redemption) – A Glop of Spaghetti for Andy Warhol"	Sanders	3:54

From the Tuli Tapes
No.	Title	Writer(s)	Length
21.	"The Rhapsody of Tuli"	Kupferberg, Sanders	8:35

From Alternate Takes from The Fugs First Folkways Sessions April 1965 (2011 Japan CD bonus tracks)
No.	Title	Length
22.	"Supergirl (The Write Underwater Version)"
23.	"Ah, Sunflower, Weary Of Time"
24.	"I'm Going To Kill Myself Over"

== Variations ==
The album has been released under multiple names and versions. The first was released in 1965 with a purple cover, credited as "The Village Fugs." The second version was released in 1966 on the ESP-Disk label with a blue-tinted cover, retitled "The Fugs First Album," and containing the exact recordings featured on the original Broadside edition; this is particularly noticeable because the song "Boobs A Lot" contains a mastering error in which the beginning of the song has been clipped off, an error that is included on both the original 1965 Broadside LP and the 1966 ESP blue-tinted LP. The third LP version, also called "The Fugs First Album," features a black-and-white cover and a few recordings which are different takes than on the earlier two editions, including a corrected full-version of "Boobs A Lot"; this third version of the LP is the most common. Note that the lack of an apostrophe seems to indicate that the title is not intended to be read as "The Fugs' First Album" (plural possessive) but rather as "The Fugs" (band name), then "First Album" (album title), as if there were an implied colon, as in "The Fugs: First Album". The album was first released on CD in 1994, with a new title. Some versions of the album were censored with the track "I Feel Like Homemade Shit" renamed to "My Baby Done Left Me" and with the word "shit" being replaced by loud overdubbed yelling.

A large number of additional performances were captured in the sessions for this album. Eleven of them first appeared on a 1967 ESP album entitled "Virgin Fugs" (ESP-1038), and an additional 7 performances (five led by the Holy Modal Rounders) first appeared on the mid-1970s compilation "Fugs 4, Rounders Score" (ESP-2018) The Fugs claim that both of these albums were unauthorized bootlegs. Three additional performances and some studio chatter appear on the Fugs' 4-CD box set "Don't Stop! Don't Stop!" The box set contains an additional three performances from these recording sessions.

The CD contains the later ESP stereo version of the album. It also includes, among its 11 bonus tracks, 6 outtakes from the sessions, including 5 from the above two ESP bootlegs. The other 11 tracks, the alternate performance of "Swineburne Stomp" from the Broadside album, and the other Broadside edit variations, remain unreleased in the CD era.

The original (mono) Broadside release contains different edits of some of the songs from the now standard stereo ESP release.

- The first three songs have longer introductions (usually a few seconds or bars of music).
- "Supergirl," while the same basic performance, has the line "Fuck like an angel" changed to "mmmm like an angel" (both versions render the last line as "shake like an mmmm in an mmmm").
- "Swinburne Stomp" is an entirely different performance, introduced with Sanders' line "In the key of metaphysical distress."
- "My Baby Done Left Me" edits out the final, very loud "shit", crudely replacing it with yodeling and a fade over a prior chorus. It does, however, leave in the earlier line "I'd give up heifer fucking." Initial Broadside pressings include a spoken introduction from Sanders: "In the key of uptight, 'I Feel Like Homemade Shit.'"
- The performance of "Boobs a Lot" starts later in the song, on the line "Down in the locker room."
- The sound quality of the first session material is extremely muffled.

At least one pressing on the ESP label includes these same takes and edits. It is unclear when the substitutions were made.

ESP releases included at least three cover variations: a blue tinted cover, a black and white cover with advertisements on the back, and a later psychedelic painting of a wizard.

== Sessions ==
This album was recorded entirely in two sessions. The first took place in April 1965 and was a chaotic 3-hour acoustic jam featuring Sanders, Kupferberg, Weaver, Stampfel and Weber, performing (by Sanders' estimate) 23 songs. The second recording session took place on September 22, 1965, according to Ed Sanders' memoir Fug You (page 161); this second session seems to have featured nine songs, recorded in stereo, including a drum set and electric instruments, with the core band members Sanders, Weaver and Kupferberg joined by musicians John Anderson (on bass), Steve Weber (on guitar) and Vinny Leary (on guitar). By this point Peter Stampfel was no longer in the band.

=== Songs recorded at the April 1965 session ===
Originally released on The Village Fugs (Broadside album):

1. "Swinburne Stomp" (version 1) (Ed Sanders, A.C. Swinburne)
2. "My Baby Done Left Me" (Sanders)
3. "Nothing" (Tuli Kupferberg) (additional intro appears on "Don't Stop! Don't Stop!")

Originally released on Virgin Fugs:

4. "We're the Fugs" (Sanders)
5. "New Amphetamine Shriek" (Peter Stampfel)
6. "Saran Wrap" (Sanders)
7. "The Ten Commandments" (Kupferberg)
8. "Hallucination Horrors" (Kupferberg)
9. "CIA Man" (Kupferberg)
10. "Coca Cola Douche" (Sanders? listed as Kupferberg)
11. "My Bed Is Getting Crowded" (Kupferberg)
12. "Caca Rocka" (Kupferberg)

Originally released on Fugs 4, Rounders Score:

13. "Defeated" (Kupferberg)
14. "Jackoff Blues" (Kupferberg)
15. "Romping Through the Swamp" (Peter Stampfel)
16. "Crowley Waltz" (Traditional)
17. "Fiddler a Dram" (Traditional)
18. "Fishing Blues" (Traditional)
19. "New Amphetamine Shriek" [different performance from #5] (Peter Stampfel)

Originally released on The Fugs First Album (ESP variation of Broadside album):

20. "Swinburne Stomp" (version 2) [different performance from #1] (Sanders, A.C. Swinburne)

Originally released on Don't Stop! Don't Stop!:

21. I'm Gonna Kill Myself Over Your Dead Body (Kupferberg)
22. "Ah, Sunflower, Weary of Time" (William Blake, Sanders) (Early version)
23. "Supergirl" (Kupferberg) (Early "Write Underwater" version)

Originally released on "The Fugs First Album" CD:

24. "In the Middle of Their First Recording Session the Fugs Sign the Worst Record Contract Since Leadbelly's" (Petito, Sanders) [this is studio chatter plus 1990s electronic effects]

Tracks 15 though 18 feature only Stampfel and Weber.

=== Songs recorded at the September 22, 1965, session ===
Originally released on The Village Fugs:

1. "Slum Goddess" (Ken Weaver)
2. "Ah, Sunflower, Weary of Time" (William Blake, Sanders)
3. "Supergirl" (Kupferberg)
4. "I Couldn't Get High" (Weaver)
5. "How Sweet I Roamed" (Blake, Sanders)
6. "Carpe Diem" (Kupferberg)
7. "Boobs a Lot" (Steve Weber)

Originally released on Virgin Fugs:

8. "I Command the House of the Devil" (Sanders)
9. "I Saw the Best Minds of My Generation Rot" (Allen Ginsberg, Sanders)

== Personnel ==
=== Performance ===
- Ed Sanders – vocals
- Tuli Kupferberg – percussion, vocals
- Ken Weaver – conga, drums, vocals
- Steve Weber – guitar, vocals
- Peter Stampfel – fiddle, harmonica, vocals
- John Anderson – bass guitar, vocals
- Vinny Leary – bass, guitar, vocals

=== Production ===
- Phil DeLancie – remastering
- David Gahr – photography
- Aaron Hurwitz – compilation, restoration
- Linda Kalin – package adaptation
- Ed Sanders – producer, liner notes, photography, memorabilia
- Harry Smith – producer

== Additional sources ==
- The Fugs Store: The Fugs First Album
