= The Fugs =

American rock band

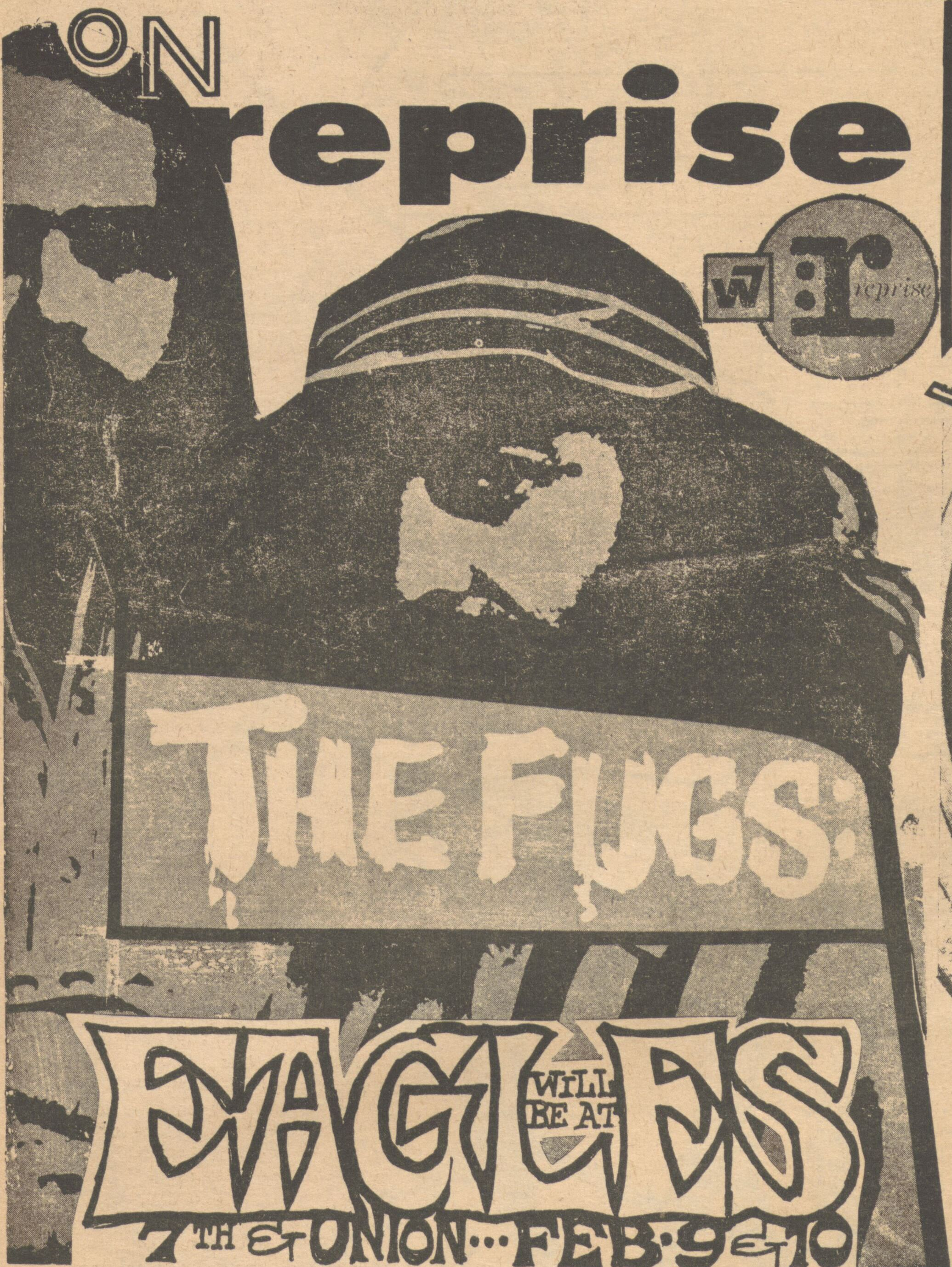
- Ad for the Fugs appearance at Eagles Auditorium, Seattle, 1968

Background information
- Origin: Lower East Side, New York City, U.S.
- Genres: Psychedelic rock; folk rock; proto-punk; avant-rock
- Years active: 1964–1969; 1984–present
- Labels: Folkways; ESP-Disk; Fontana; Reprise; Transatlantic
- Members: Ed Sanders; Tuli Kupferberg; Ken Weaver; Steve Taylor; Coby Batty; Scott Petito
- Website: thefugs.com

The Fugs is an American rock band formed in New York City in late 1964, by poets Ed Sanders and Tuli Kupferberg, with Ken Weaver on drums. Soon afterward, they were joined by Peter Stampfel and Steve Weber of the Holy Modal Rounders. Kupferberg named the band from a euphemism for fuck used in Norman Mailer's novel The Naked and the Dead.

The band were supported by folklorist Harry Smith, compiler of Anthology of American Folk Music, who helped them sign with Folkways Records. They became prominent leaders of the 1960s underground scene and the American counterculture of that decade. The group is known for its comedic, satirical and explicit lyricism as well as their persistent anti–Vietnam War sentiment, which culminated in Ed Sanders leading an "Exorcism of the Pentagon" in 1967. Since the 1980s, they have performed at several events regarding other U.S. involved wars.

== Formation ==
The band's original core members, Ed Sanders, Tuli Kupferberg, and Ken Weaver, were joined at various times in the 1960s by a number of others, some of whom were noted session musicians or members of other bands, and later by Steve Weber and Peter Stampfel of the Holy Modal Rounders, bassist John Anderson, guitarist Vinny Leary, guitarist Peter Kearney, keyboardist Lee Crabtree, guitarist Jon Kalb, guitarist Stefan Grossman, singer and guitarist Jake Jacobs, guitarist Eric Gale, bassist Chuck Rainey, keyboardist Robert Banks, bassist Charles Larkey, guitarist Ken Pine, guitarist Danny Kortchmar, clarinetist Perry Robinson, bassist Bill Wolf, and drummer Bob Mason.

For most of their career, the Fugs were composed of the primary singer-songwriters Sanders and, until his death, Kupferberg; the composer, songwriter, guitarist and long-time Allen Ginsberg collaborator Steven Taylor; singer-songwriter and percussionist Coby Batty; and Scott Petito, a musician and music producer.

The band signed a record contract with ESP-Disk in 1965. The Fugs said that "our royalty rate was less than 3%, one of the lower percentages in the history of western civilization". The owner of the label, Bernard Stollman, has frequently faced accusation of not paying royalties to artists. In February 1967, the group was signed to Atlantic Records and recorded one album, The Fugs Eat It, but it was never released.

== Career ==
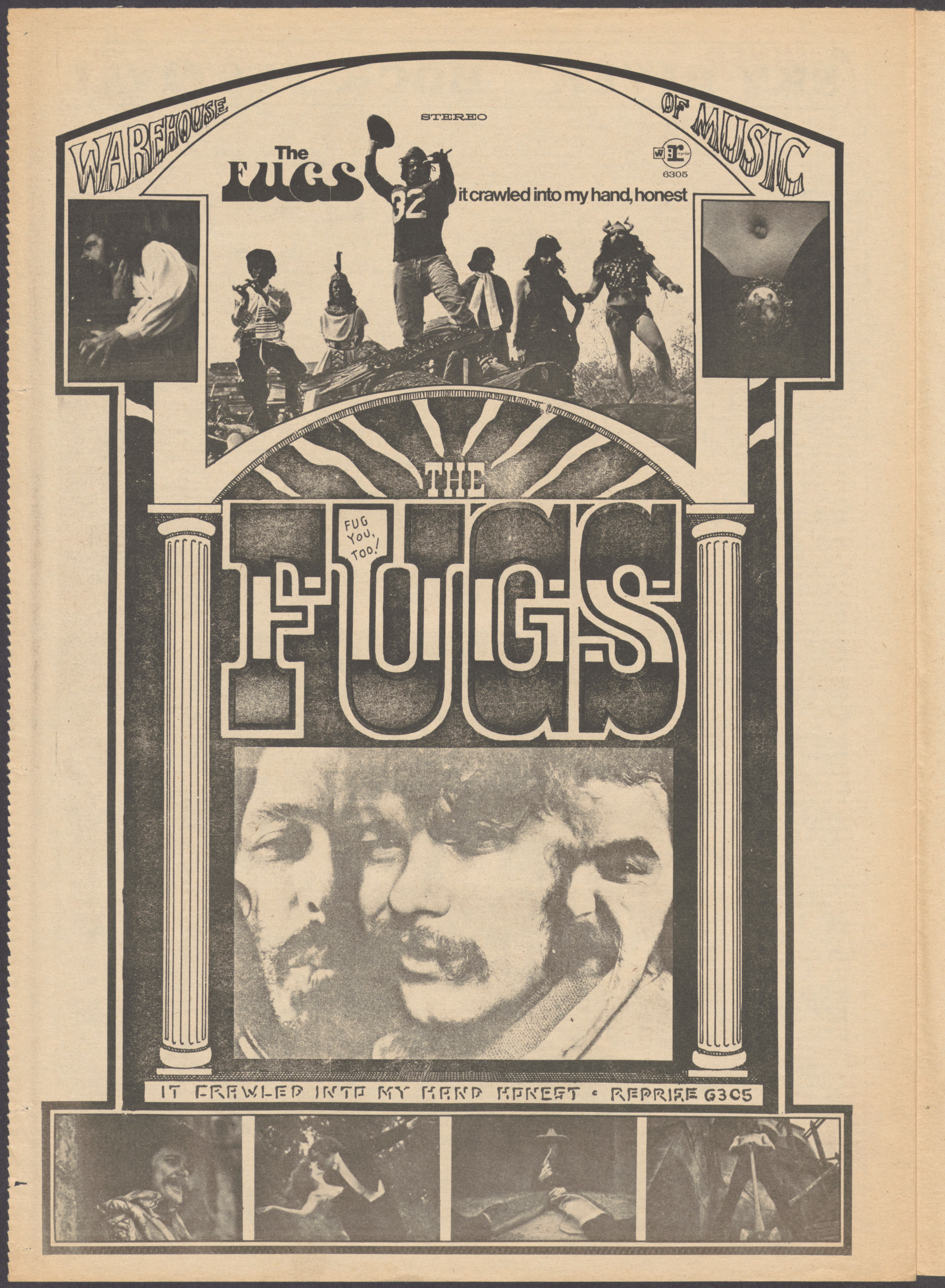
It Crawled into My Hand, Honest, 1968

=== 1960s ===
In a 2012 interview with National Public Radio, Ed Sanders read a leaflet from an August 1965 show: "The Fugs present: Night of napalm, songs against the war, rock n' roll bomb shrieks, heavy metal orgasms! Watch all The Fugs die in a napalm raid!"

multimedia the Exploding Plastic Inevitable the Holy Modal RoundersDuring the mid-to late 1960s, the Fugs' core members, who were Ed Tuli Ken, were Among those who appeared in the 1960s were guitarists Danny Kortchmar and Eric Gale, keyboardist Lee Crabtree, bassist Chuck Rainey, clarinetist Perry Robinson, and others.

In early 1965, Peter Stampfel and Steve Weber of the Holy Modal Rounders briefly joined the group and contributed to rehearsals and the sessions for their debut album. Harry Smithsigning Folkways Records who released album The Village Fugs Sing Ballads of Contemporary Protest, Point of Views, and General Dissatisfaction. However, ESP-Disk' promptly re-released the album and put out their follow-up The Fugs. In October 1966, writer Norman Jopling reported in British music magazine Record Mirror: "Three labels, ESP, Atlantic, and MGM are battling to sign the Fugs whose first LP on ESP has been on the Billboard' LP chart for fourteen weeks without any air play".

Additionally, Andy Warhol briefly considered the Fugs and Holy Modal Rounders for his multimedia series the Exploding Plastic Inevitable before selecting the Velvet Underground. Lower East Side In 1965, the Fugs were briefly considered by Andy Warhol as the band for his performance art series, alongside, before Warhol ultimately chose the Velvet Underground. Warhol had attended early Fugs performances and was the subject of their improvised track “Spontaneous Salute to Andy Warhol,” recorded during a rehearsal at the Peace Eye Bookstore. According to Ed Sanders, he was gifted three silkscreened flower images by Warhol; two he ultimately lost. Warhol was also present at the group’s 1965 benefit Night of Napalm at the Bridge Theatre, and their “Fugs Spaghetti Death” ritual, during which Sanders recalled hitting Warhol in the face with a handful of pasta.'

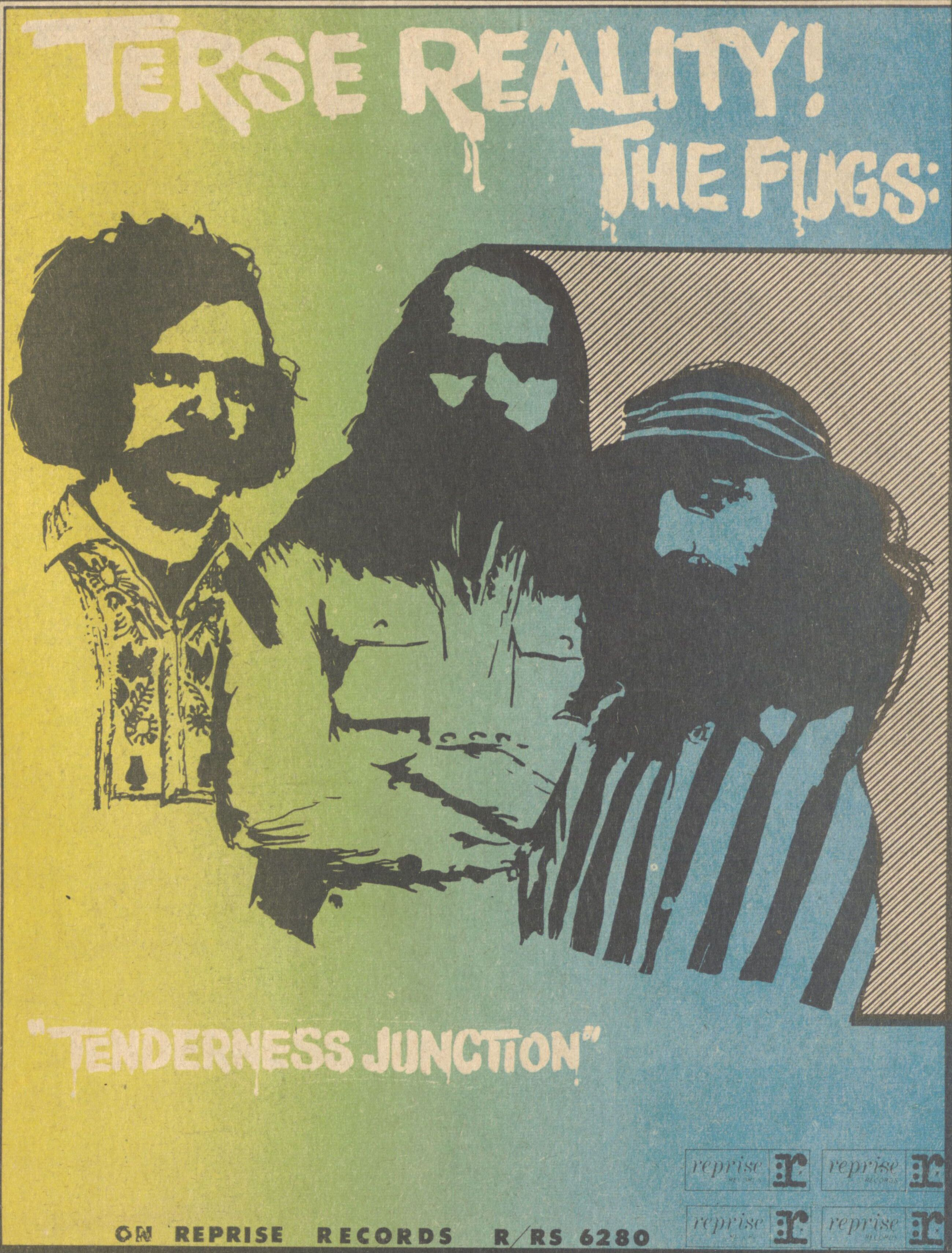
Ad for The Fugs album Tenderness Junction in the Seattle underground paper Helix, January 18, 1968

By 1966, the Fugs had become fixtures of the Lower East Side scene, performing at anti-war rallies and benefits. The Fugs became immediately prominent leaders of the 1960s counterculture.

Their participation in the National Mobilization Committee to End the War in Vietnam's 1967 March on the Pentagonand others attempted to encircle and levitatethe Pentagonis chronicled in Norman Mailers The Armies of the Night.A recording on the Fugs1968 album Tenderness Junction, "Exorcising the Evil Spirits from the Pentagon Oct. In 1968, toured Europe twiceIn 1969, the group in file to Sam Ervin investigate the band hearing copies of The Fugs First Album and Virgin Fugs. An excerpt the group "the filthiest and most vulgar thing the human mind could possibly conceive".The copies of as well as and considered prosecuting the Fugs for obscenity.

A recording of the ritual, titled “Exorcising the Evil Spirits from the Pentagon,” appears on the Fugs' 1968 Reprise album Tenderness Junction.

In February 1967, the group briefly signed with Atlantic Records and recorded an album titled The Fugs Eat It, which was never released. Later that year, they joined Reprise Records, releasing Tenderness Junction (1968) and It Crawled into My Hand, Honest (1968). On leaving ESP, Sanders later joked that "our royalty rate was less than 3%, one of the lower percentages in the history of Western civilization."

=== 1970s–1990s ===
The plans were later dropped, as they were advised by Stephen B. Kaufman that it wasn't a "good vehicle for prosecution".

In 1971, at a General Conference of the Church of Jesus Christ of Latter-day Saints, a Fugs song was castigated by Ezra Taft Benson, a high-ranking elder who would go on to become its President. In a speech condemning rock music as Satanic, Benson said "the cynic defends his degeneracy by ridiculing his critics with confusing metaphors". He complained that critiquing "The words of the rock recording 'I Couldn't Get High'" caused people to call for the LDS hymn "High on the Mountain Top" to be dropped from songbooks. Benson disputed the retort that "If one sees filthy implications in a popular song, it is because he has a dirty mind", saying "No filth is [merely] implied in many of the lyrics. It is proclaimed."

One of their better-known songs is an adaptation of Matthew Arnold's poem "Dover Beach". Others were settings of William Blake's poems "Ah! Sun-flower" and "How Sweet I Roam'd". Another, "Nothing", is a paraphrasing of the Yiddish folk song "Bulbes".

For most of their later career, the Fugs were composed of the primary singer-songwriters Sanders and Kupferberg, together with composer and guitarist Steven Taylor—a long-time collaborator of Allen Ginsberg—percussionist and vocalist Coby Batty, and musician-producer Scott Petito.

After pursuing individual projects over the years, in 1984 Sanders and Kupferberg re-formed the band and staged a series of Fugs reunion concerts. On August 15, 1988, at the Byrdcliff Barn in Woodstock, New York, the Fugs performed one of their first real reunion concerts. This incarnation of the Fugs included, at various times, the guitarist and singer Steve Taylor (who was also Allen Ginsberg's teaching assistant at the Naropa Institute), the drummer and singer Coby Batty, the bassist Mark Kramer, the guitarist Vinny Leary (who had contributed to the first two original Fugs albums), and the bassist and keyboardist Scott Petito. The re-formed Fugs performed concerts at numerous locations in the United States and Europe over the next several years.

In 1994 the band intended to perform a series of concerts in Woodstock, New York (where Sanders had lived for many years) to commemorate the 1969 Woodstock Festival, which had actually occurred near the town of Bethel, some 50 miles away. They learned that a group of promoters were planning to stage Woodstock '94 that August near Saugerties, about eight miles from Woodstock, and that this festival would be much more tightly controlled and commercialized than the original. Consequently, the Fugs staged their own August 1994 concerts as "The Real Woodstock Festival", in an atmosphere more in keeping with the spirit of the 1969 festival. The basic Fugs roster of Sanders, Kupferberg, Taylor, Batty, and Petito performed in this series of concerts with additional vocal support from Amy Fradon and Leslie Ritter and also with appearances by Allen Ginsberg and Country Joe McDonald. In 2003, the group released The Fugs Final CD (Part 1) with positive feedback. In 2004, the Fugs began to record Be Free: The Fugs Final CD (Part 2).

=== 2000s–2020s ===
In 2009, Kupferberg suffered two strokes, the latter of which severely hindered his eyesight. He was under constant care, but was able to finish recording his tracks for Be Free in his New York City apartment. A benefit for Kupferberg was held in Brooklyn, New York, in February 2010, featuring all of the Fugs minus Kupferberg, as well as Lou Reed, Sonic Youth, Patti Smith Group guitarist Lenny Kaye, and others. Be Free: The Fugs Final CD (Part 2) was released on February 23, 2010. The album art, designed by Sanders, featured a snail reading Allen Ginsberg's poem "Howl". The album was produced by Taylor and Sanders.

Kupferberg died on July 12, 2010, in Manhattan, at the age of 86. In 2008, in one of his last interviews, he told Mojo magazine, "Nobody who lived through the '50s thought the '60s could've existed. So there's always hope."

The remaining Fugs from time to time seriously consider further performances. On June 11, 2011, the four remaining Fugs performed at Queen Elizabeth Hall in London as part of the annual Meltdown Festival, curated that year by Ray Davies of the Kinks. Their set received a four-star review in The Guardian.

They performed at the Beachland Ballroom in Cleveland on November 30, 2012, and at the City Winery in Chicago on December 1, 2012. They performed at the Brooklyn Folk Festival on November 10, 2021.

== Legacy ==
have influences the Godz David Peel Red Krayola,. While covered by the Melvins, Sun City Girls, Richie Havens and the Edgar Broughton Band.

The band can be seen performing in the cult film Chappaqua (1967) by Conrad Rooks. Tuli Kupferberg made appearances in W.R.: Mysteries of the Organism (1971) by Dušan Makavejev and played God in Voulez-vous coucher avec God? (1972) by Michael Hirsh and Jack Christie.

In 1968, writer Tom Robbins described them as "Incongruously… this trio of hairy gross ginch gropers is the most intellectual, sophisticated and literary ensemble in rock."

Their song "CIA Man" was featured during the closing credits of the 2008 Coen brothers film Burn After Reading, and during the closing credits of the fifth episode of the 2017 docudrama miniseries Wormwood.

They've been cited as influences by Bob Dylan, Sonic Youth, Syd Barrett of Pink Floyd,the Godz,David Peel, Lou Reed of the Velvet Underground, Frank Zappa, Iggy Pop of the Stooges, Donald Fagen of Steely Dan, Jonathan Richman and King Missile, and covered by the Melvins, Sun City Girls, Richie Havens, and the Edgar Broughton Band.

The band is the subject of the 2025 documentary Fugs Film!.

== Primary lineups ==
The Fugs went through a number of lineup changes. Below are those that lasted the longest. For instance, guitarist Stefan Grossman was with the band for only several weeks, so this lineup is not included.

== Discography ==
=== Studio albums ===
Year	Title	US Top 200	Label
1965	The Village Fugs Sing Ballads of Contemporary Protest, Point of Views, and General Dissatisfaction	—	Broadside/Folkways
1966	The Fugs First Album*	142	ESP-Disk
1966	The Fugs	95	ESP-Disk
1967	The Fugs Eat It (unreleased)	—	Atlantic
1967	Virgin Fugs	—	ESP Disk
1968	Tenderness Junction	—	Reprise
1968	It Crawled Into My Hand, Honest	167	Reprise
1969	The Belle of Avenue A	—	Reprise
1986	No More Slavery	—	New Rose
1987	Star Peace – A Musical Drama in Three Acts	—	New Rose
2003	The Fugs Final CD (Part 1)	—	Artemis
2010	Be Free: The Fugs Final CD (Part 2)	—	Fugs Records
2023	Dancing in the Universe	—	Fugs Records

* The Fugs First Album is a retitled reissue of the Broadside/Folkways LP.

=== Live albums ===
Year	Title	Label
1970	Golden Filth (Live at the Fillmore East)	Reprise
1984	Refuse to Be Burnt Out	New Rose
1984	Baskets of Love	Olufsen
1993	Fugs Live in Woodstock	MUSIK/MUSIK
1995	The Real Woodstock Festival	Big Beat

2026 / More Golden Filth - Live 1968 / Olufsen Records

=== Compilation albums ===
Year	Title	Label	Notes
1975	Fugs 4, Rounders Score	ESP-Disk	Consists of recordings from first two albums plus two unreleased cuts from first album sessions. (Four unreleased tracks by The Holy Modal Rounders are included, and date from first album sessions as well.)
1982	The Fugs Greatest Hits Vol. 1	PVC	Compilation drawing from the first three albums.
1990	Songs from a Portable Forest	Gazell	Chronicles the 1980s reunion albums.
1994	Live from the 60s	Big Beat	This album is made up of recordings from assorted (unprofessionally recorded) tapes of various shows, and home demos.
2001	Electromagnetic Steamboat: The Reprise Recordings	Rhino Handmade	Includes the four Reprise albums in their entirety plus special promo edits, mono mix of Tenderness Junction (except for "Aphrodite Mass") and tracks from the unreleased Atlantic LP (in censored, mono form).
2006	Greatest Hits 1984–2004	Fugs Records	
2008	Don't Stop! Don't Stop!	Big Beat	Repackaging of the first two albums with various outtakes, demos and live recordings.
2010	Tenderness Junction/It Crawled Into My Hand, Honest	Floating World	Two-fer combining the first two Reprise albums. Unlike the Rhino Handmade set, which used tapes, this release is sourced from vinyl.
