= Fugs Film! =

2025 documentary film

FUGS FILM! is a 2025 documentary film which explores the history of the band The Fugs.
