= Voulez-vous coucher avec God? =

- Directed by: Jack Christie; Michael Hirsh
- Written by: Jack Christie; Michael Hirsh; Patrick Loubert
- Produced by: Jack Christie; Michael Hirsh
- Starring: Tuli Kupferberg
- Cinematography: Kenneth Locker; Patrick Loubert
- Edited by: Jack Christie; Michael Hirsh
- Release date: 1972
- Running time: 69 minutes
- Country: Canada
- Language: English

Voulez-vous coucher avec God? ("Do you want to sleep with God?") is a 1972 Canadian experimental film directed by Jack Christie and Michael Hirsh. Combining live-action and animation, the film is heavily steeped in late 1960s - early 1970s counterculture and features of a soundtrack of popular music from the period. It tells the story of a bigoted and war-crazed God, portrayed by Tuli Kupferberg, who sends an angel down to Earth to become President of the United States, leading to chaos.

== Reception ==
Voulez-vous coucher avec God? was reviewed positively by J. Hoberman in The Village Voice, who called it "slapdash, but not badly made". AllMovie gave the film five out of five stars.

== Re-release ==
The film received retrospective and festival screenings in 2010 and 2011. On November 14, 2010, it was presented at the Anthology Film Archives in Manhattan as part of a Tuli Kupferberg memorial. On February 3, 2011, it was screened at the 40th International Film Festival Rotterdam. On April 11 and 13, 2011, it was screened at the 13th Buenos Aires International Festival of Independent Cinema. On June 30, 2011 it was theatrically screened in Canada for the first time in decades at the TIFF Bell Lightbox in Toronto as part of its Canada Day programming, with Hirsh in attendance.

A new high-definition transfer from the original 16 mm film was released on DVD in 2011 by Ron Mann's film distribution company Films We Like.
