= My Pretty Rose Tree =

Poem by William Blake

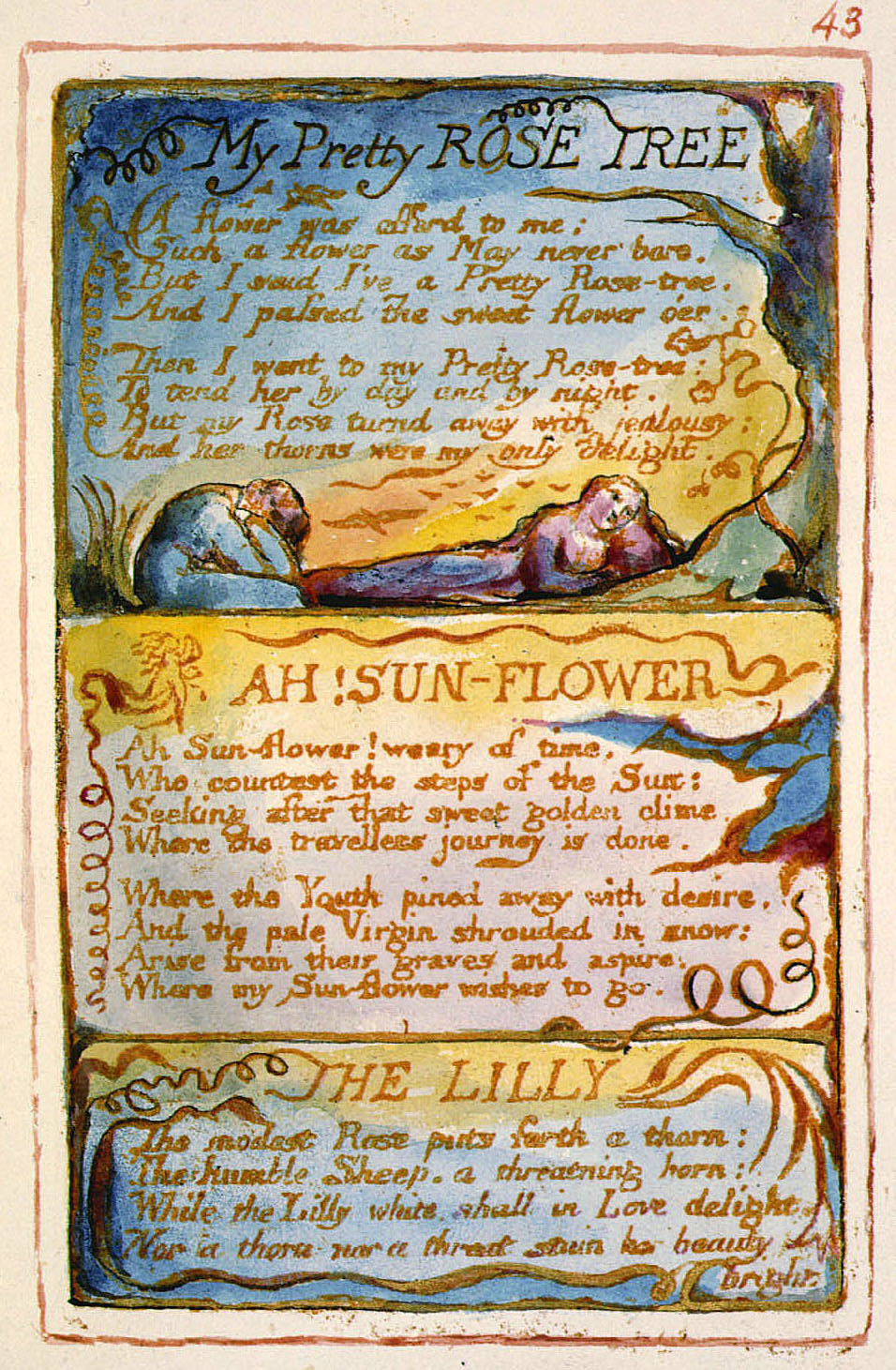
Copy AA of Blake's engraving of the poem in Songs of Experience printed in 1826 and currently held by the Fitzwilliam Museum

"My Pretty Rose Tree" is a poem written by the English poet William Blake. It was published as part of his collection Songs of Experience in 1794.

== Poem ==
A flower was offered to me;
Such a flower as May never bore.
But I said I've a Pretty Rose-tree:
And I passed the sweet flower o'er.

Then I went to my Pretty Rose-tree;
To tend her by day and by night.
But my Rose turnd away with jealousy:
And her thorns were my only delight.

== Summary ==
A man is offered a flower far surpassing the beauty of an ordinary flower, but he turns it down because he already has a pretty rose tree. He then returns to his tree and tends to her every need both day and night, but she only turns away from him in jealousy and shows him the thorns of her own.

== Vision of love ==
According to Antal, Blake's Flower Plate is composed of three flower poems on the same plate for a reason: to illustrate three types of love; Poetic Love, Earthly Love, and Human Love. In the "threefold vision of love" idea, this poem represents "Human Love". This is considered to be "Human Love" due to the possessiveness and temptation echoed throughout the poem.

== Themes and interpretations ==
This poem seems to echo that of a story of a married couple. The man is surrounded by beauty, and at least one beautiful woman, but he declines them all to return to his wife. He is very possessive with his constant use of the word "my", and thus "imprisons" his Rose Tree. She, however, turns away with jealousy and in turn only reveals her thorns to him.

Johnson describes "My Pretty Rose Tree" as "...an ironic reconsideration of the emblem convention. Blake's speaker, having rejected the lovely flower offered him, tries to tend his pretty rose tree with all the single-minded ardor of a Petrarchan lover; but his devotion is a sickness nourished by his perverse or ironic 'delight' in the thorns of jealousy. His love object...both attracts and repels..." In this, the man in the poem is trying to show his love to his rose tree, but only seems to have the love unrequited, even though he treats the rose tree like royalty. This echoes the idea of "Human Love" as we often want things we can't have, and become infatuated with things, or idealizing them instead of actually loving them. The rose tree showing her thorns of jealousy only entices the man more, much like it would any other human. The jealousy is also an acknowledgement (of sorts) of the tree's love for the man. Jealousy is perhaps the last remaining obvious proof of the tree's reciprocal desire for him; proof which simultaneously bestows upon him the power to provoke her and to 'delight' in the pain he causes by so doing.

One theme continuously echoes through the minds of critics: possessiveness.

=== Possessiveness ===
Antal states that "The man actually imprisons his partner who reacts accordingly - to ownership with distrust." Antal also goes further to mention the frequent use of the word "my" in the poem, especially when in reference to rose tree. The man lays claim over the rose tree, and though he tends to her every need, seems to get nothing but contempt and jealousy from her. Not only is the rose tree trapped underneath the possessiveness of the man, but another "trap" could be implied according to Antal with "The rose-tree, as a rose bush, hints at the possibility of childbearing." Durant furthers the point of possessiveness when he says, "The keyword is 'I've'. What he affirms is not that he is hers, but that she is his. He is not thinking of his responsibility to her, but of his rights over her, and of her obligations towards him." This interpretation makes it sound as if the man is expecting the woman to bear him children. In a time when women were considered men's property anyway, not only would the woman be possessed by her husband, but her children as well. If the rose tree, or rather the woman, fears that her husband is unfaithful to her, she wouldn't want to trap her children within that environment.

== Sources ==
- Antal, Eva. ""Labour of Love"—Ovidian Flower-Figures in William Blake's Songs." Eger Journal of English Studies (2008): 23-40. Web.
- Blake, William (1988). Erdman, David V. (ed.). The Complete Poetry and Prose (Newly revised ed.). Anchor Books. ISBN 0385152132.
- Durant, G. H. "Blake's 'My Pretty Rose Tree'--An Interpretation." Theoria: A Journal of Social and Political Theory (1965): 33–37. Web.
- Durrant, G. H. "Blake's 'My Pretty Rose-Tree'." Theoria: A Journal of Social and Political Theory (1968): 1–5. Web.
- Johnson, Mary Lynn. "Emblem and Symbol in Blake." Huntington Library Quarterly (1974): 151–170. Web.
