= Ken Weaver (musician) =

American musician

Ken Weaver (born 1940) is an American singer, songwriter and musician. Born on Galveston Island, Texas, he grew up in El Campo and went on to become a Russian translator for the Air Force. A drummer, Weaver joined Ed Sanders and Tuli Kupferberg to form the rock band The Fugs in 1964. He wrote and sang the songs "Slum Goddess," "I Couldn't Get High," "Dust Devil," and "Four Minutes to Twelve," and contributed to numerous others. He has since retired from performing. In 1983, he wrote Texas Crude, "The How-To on Talkin’ Texan”, a collection of Texan slang, with illustrations by R. Crumb. He studied Russian and worked as a teaching assistant at the University of Arizona in Tucson in 1982-83.
