= Tuli Kupferberg =

American poet, author, cartoonist and publisher (1923–2010)

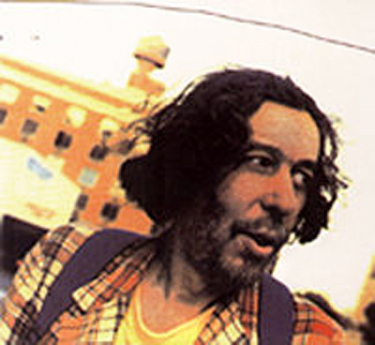
- Born: Naphtali Kupferberg; September 28, 1923; New York City, U.S.
- Died: July 12, 2010 (aged 86); New York City, U.S.
- Education: Brooklyn College
- Occupations: Author, poet, musician, cartoonist, publisher
- Years active: 1958–2009
- Known for: The Fugs; 1001 Ways to Beat the Draft; 1001 Ways to Live Without Working
- Spouse: Sylvia Topp
- Children: Joe, Noah, Samara.

Naphtali "Tuli" Kupferberg (September 28, 1923 – July 12, 2010) was an American counterculture poet, author, singer, editorial cartoonist, comic artist, columnist, publisher, and co-founder of the rock band The Fugs.

== Biography ==
Naphtali Kupferberg was born into a Jewish, Yiddish-speaking household in New York City. A cum laude graduate of Brooklyn College in 1944, Kupferberg founded the magazine Birth in 1958.

Kupferberg reportedly appears in Ginsberg's poem Howl as the person "who jumped off the Brooklyn Bridge and walked away unknown and forgotten into the ghostly daze of Chinatown soup alleyways & firetrucks, not even one free beer." The incident in question actually occurred on the Manhattan Bridge. Ginsberg's description in Howl uses poetic license. Kupferberg did jump from the Manhattan Bridge in 1944, after which he was picked up by a passing tugboat and taken to Gouverneur Hospital. Severely injured, he had broken the transverse process of his spine and spent time in a body cast.

In 1964, Kupferberg formed the satirical rock group the Fugs with poet Ed Sanders.

Kupferberg was active in New York pacifist-anarchist circles. In 1965 he was one of the lecturers at the newly founded Free University of New York.

He appeared as a machine-gun-toting soldier policing Manhattan in W.R.: Mysteries of the Organism, a 1971 film about the revolutionary psychiatrist Wilhelm Reich by Dušan Makavejev.

An anti-police-brutality skit from his Revolting Theatre appeared in the 1971 underground film Dynamite Chicken directed by Ernest Pintoff, and featuring Richard Pryor.

In 1972, Kupferberg played the role of God in the Canadian experimental film Voulez-vous coucher avec God?. Kupferberg later appeared in the music video for Williamsburg Will Oldham Horror by Jeffrey Lewis.

Kupferberg suffered a stroke in April 2009 at his home in New York City, which left him severely visually impaired and in need of regular nursing care. After treatment for a number of days at a New York hospital, followed by convalescence at a nursing home, he recuperated at home.

Kupferberg died in New York Downtown Hospital in Manhattan of kidney failure and sepsis on July 12, 2010. In 2008, in one of his last interviews, he told Mojo Magazine, "Nobody who lived through the '50s thought the '60s could've existed. So there's always hope."

== Bibliography ==
- Birth 1, The Bohemian Issue (1958)
- Birth 2, Children's Writings (1959)
- Beating (1959)
- Children as Authors: A Big Bibliography (1959, with Sylvia Topp)
- Snow Job: Poems 1946–1959 (1959)
- Selected Fruits & Nuts (1959)
- Birth 3, parts 1 & 2 Stimulants, An Exhibition (1960)
- 1001 Ways to Live Without Working (1961)
- The Grace & Beauty of the Human Form (1961)
- 1001 Ways to Live Without Working (1961, rev. 1968; German translation by Max Wickert & Hubert Kulterer, with facing English text, Stadtlichter Presse 2009, 2015)
- 3,000,000,000,000,000,000,000,000,000,000,000,000,000,000 Beatniks : or, The War Against the Beats (1961)
- Sex and War (1962)
- The Mississippi (A Study of the White Race) (1962)
- The Rub-Ya-Out of Omore Diem (1962)
- The Christine Keeler Colouring Book & Cautionary Tale (1963)
- Kill for Peace (1965)
- Caught in the Act: a Legal Vaudeville (1966)
- The Book of the Body (with Judith Wehlau, 1966)
- I Say to Masturbate is Human, to Fuck Divine (1966)
- 1001 Ways to Beat the Draft (with Robert Bashlow, 1966)
- Fuck Nam : a morality play (1967)
- 1001 Ways to Make Love (1969)
- Newspoems (1971)
- Listen to the Mockingbird; satiric songs to tunes you know (1973)
- As They Were (with Sylvia Topp, 1973)
- Universal Housewife (1975)
- First Glance (with Sylvia Topp, 1978)
- As They Were Too (with Sylvia Topp, 1979)
- O God! (1980)
- The Crazy Paper (1980)
- Less Newspoems (1981)
- Questionable Cartoons (1981)
- True Professions (1981)
- Why Don't We Do It in the Bed? (1982)
- Was It Good For You Too? (1983)
- After the Balls Are Ova (1984)
- In Media's Feces (1986)
- Kill For Peace, Again (1987)
- Reaganation (1987)
- The Tuli Kupferberg Instant Lottery Broadside (1988)
- The Dark Night of the Soul in the Poetry Mines (1988)
- Signed By the Artist (1990)
- Don't Make Trouble (1991)
- My Prick is Bigger Than Yours (1992)
- The Land that God Remembered (1992)
- The Old Fucks at Home (1992)
- You Know Helen : Maybe Chimps Know a Lot More Than We Think (1994)
- Hey Ann! : What's The Diff Between Religion & Patriotism? (with Dave Jordan, 1994)
- Whitman said : "In order to have great art you have to have great audiences!" (1994)
- When I Hear the Word 'Culture' I Reach for My Gun (1994)
- I Hate Poems About Poems About Poems (1994)
- Great Moments in the History of Sport : No. 4, The Spartans Invent Football (1994)
- Teach Yourself Fucking (2000)
- Paris I Have Never Seen (2001)

== Discography ==
- No Deposit No Return (1967)

ESP Disk – ESP-1035

- Tuli & Friends (1989)

Shimmy Disc – shimmy 020
