= Ed Sanders =

American poet and activist (born 1939)

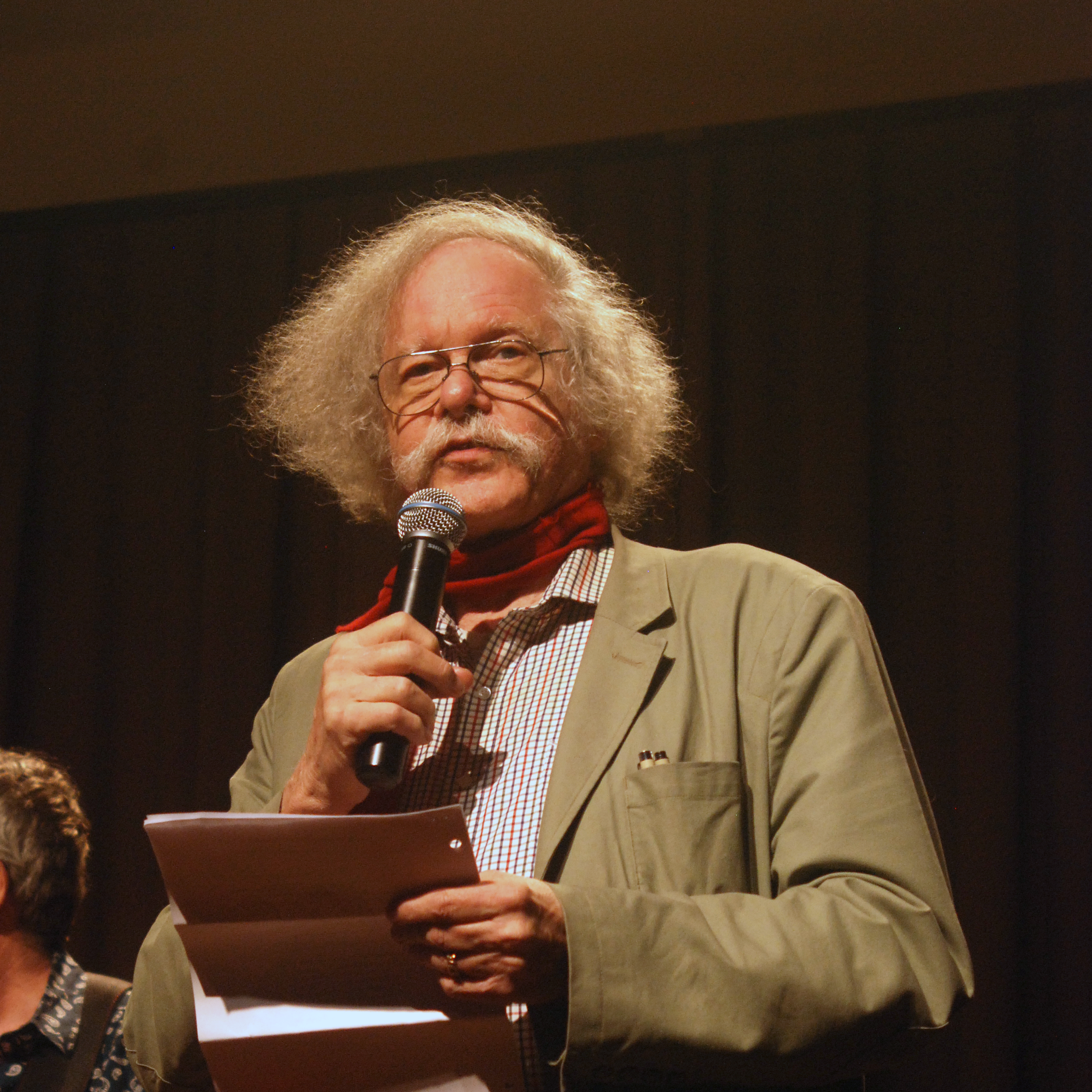
- Sanders reading at the "House Divided" poetry event, Cooper Union, April 2017
- Born: Edward Sanders; August 17, 1939 (age 87); Kansas City, Missouri, U.S.
- Education: New York University
- Occupations: Poet; author; publisher; social activist; environmentalist; musician
- Years active: 1958–present
- Known for: The Fugs; Poem from Jail, City Lights Books, 1963; Woodstock Journal
- Spouse: Miriam Sanders (m. 1967)
- Awards: Guggenheim Fellowship, National Endowment for the Arts Fellowship, American Book Award, Foundation for Contemporary Arts Grants to Artists Award

Edward Sanders (born August 17, 1939) is an American poet, singer, activist, author, publisher and longtime member of the rock band the Fugs. He has been called a bridge between the Beat and hippie generations. Sanders is considered to have been active and "present at the counterculture's creation."

== Biography ==
Sanders was born in Kansas City, Missouri. He dropped out of the University of Missouri in 1958 and hitchhiked to New York City's Greenwich Village to attend New York University. He graduated in 1964, with a degree in Greek.

Sanders wrote his first notable poem, "Poem from Jail", on toilet paper in his cell after being jailed for protesting the launch of nuclear submarines armed with nuclear missiles in 1961. In 1962, he founded the avant-garde journal Fuck You/A Magazine of the Arts. Sanders opened the Peace Eye Bookstore at 383 East Tenth Street on the Lower East Side; the store became a gathering place for Bohemians, writers and radicals. On January 1, 1966, police raided Peace Eye Bookstore and charged Sanders with obscenity, charges he fended off with the aid of the ACLU. Notoriety generated by the case led to his appearance on the February 17, 1967 cover of Life Magazine, which proclaimed him "a leader of New York's Other Culture."

In late 1964, Sanders founded the Fugs with Tuli Kupferberg. The band broke up in 1969 and reformed in 1984. On October 21, 1967, on the National Mobilization Committee to End the War in Vietnam's March on the Pentagon, Sanders helped The Fugs and the San Francisco Diggers in an attempt to "exorcise" The Pentagon. In 1968, he signed the "Writers and Editors War Tax Protest" pledge, vowing to refuse tax payments in protest against the Vietnam War. That same year he opened The Peace Eye Bookstore at 383 East 10th Street in the East Village (then commonly referred to as the Lower East Side) of New York City.

In 1967, Fontier Press in Cleveland published Peace Eye, a collection of Sander's drawings and hieroglyphs and carnal poems, many of which were previously published in Fuck You: A Magazine of the Arts, Blue Beat, King Lord/Queen Freak, Mother, and Nice. These included Sanders’ Soft Man, Toe Queen and Gobble Gang poems. Peace Eye also included an introductory poem by Charles Olson.

In 1969, Sanders recorded and released his first solo album for Reprise Records, Sanders' Truck Stop. Reviewing in Christgau's Record Guide: Rock Albums of the Seventies (1981), Robert Christgau wrote: "This is literally a country-rock takeoff—not a parody but a departure. But though I hesitate to criticize a man who is not only a saint and a genius but who says hello to me at the post office, I must point out that the yodeling country twang Sanders developed with the Fugs has never known the difference between parody and departure, which makes some of these songs seem crueller than they're intended to be. Of course, sometimes they're cruel on purpose—like 'The Iliad,' a saga of good old queer-bashing with a Greek-to-me intro. And sometimes, like 'Jimmy Joe, the Hippybilly Boy,' they're—snurfle—lyrical and sad."

In 1971, Sanders wrote The Family, a profile of the events leading up to the Tate-LaBianca murders. He attended the Manson group's murder trial, and spent time at their residence at the Spahn Movie Ranch. There have been two updated editions of The Family, the most recent in 2002. The Process Church of the Final Judgement sued Sanders's U.S. publisher for defamation over a chapter linking them with Manson's activities. The case was settled by the publisher, who removed the disputed chapter from future editions. The Process Church then sued Sanders's British publisher, but lost the suit and were forced to pay the defendant's legal fees.

Later in the 1970s, Sanders contracted to write a book about the popular rock band the Eagles. In an interview, Sanders described the contract as paying "very, very well." He worked on it for two years, generating a four volume manuscript that was never published. In 2005, he sold lyrics worksheets that he'd received in connection with the intended biography, leading to the buyer's and others' prosecution in 2024 for conspiracy to criminally possess stolen property; however, the trial would later be dropped by prosecutors. Sanders was not charged.

Sanders is the founder of the Investigative Poetry movement. His 1976 manifesto Investigative Poetry, published by Lawrence Ferlinghetti's City Lights Books, influenced investigative writing and poetry during the ensuing decades. In the 1990s, Sanders began using the principles of Investigative Poetry to create a series of book-length poems on literary figures and American History. Among these works are Chekhov, 1968: A History in Verse, and The Poetry and Life of Allen Ginsberg. In 1998, Sanders began work on a 9-volume America, A History in Verse. The first five volumes, tracing the history of the 20th century, were published in a CD format at over 2,000 pages in length.

Sanders received a Guggenheim Fellowship in poetry in 1983, and a National Endowment for the Arts Fellowship in poetry in 1987. His Thirsting for Peace in a Raging Century, Selected Poems 1961–1985 won an American Book Award in 1988. He was chosen to deliver the Charles Olson Memorial Lectures at SUNY Buffalo in 1983. In 1997, he received a Writers Community residency sponsored by the YMCA National Writer's Voice through the Lila Wallace Reader's Digest Fund.

In 1997, he was awarded a grant from the Foundation for Contemporary Arts Grants to Artists Award. In 2000 and 2003, he was Writer-in-Residence at the New York State Writers Institute in Albany, New York.

Sanders lives in Woodstock, New York, where he publishes the online Woodstock Journal with his wife of over 56 years, writer and painter Miriam R. Sanders. He also invents musical instruments, including the Talking Tie, the microtonal Microlyre, and the Lisa Lyre, a musical contraption involving light-activated switches and a reproduction of Da Vinci's Mona Lisa.

== Selected bibliography ==
- Fuck You: A Magazine of the Arts, New York: Peace Eye Bookstore (1962–1965)
- Poem from Jail, San Francisco: City Lights Books, 1963
- Peace Eye (1967)
- Shards of God (1970)
- The Family: The Story of Charles Manson's Dune Buggy Attack Battalion (1971, New Edition, 1990)
- Egyptian Hieroglyphics (1973)
- Tales of Beatnik Glory, Volume 1 (1975)
- Investigative Poetry (1976)
- 20,000 A.D. (1976)
- The Party: A Chronological Perspective on a Confrontation at a Buddhist Seminary, Woodstock, N.Y.: Poetry, Crime & Culture Press (1977)
- Fame & Love in New York (1980)
- The Z-D Generation (1981)
- The Cutting Prow (1983)
- Hymn to Maple Syrup & Other Poems (1985)
- Thirsting for Peace in a Raging Century: Selected Poems 1961–1985 (1987)
- Poems for Robin (1987)
- Tales of Beatnik Glory, Volumes 1 & 2 (1990) New York: Citadel Underground. ISBN 978-0-8065-1172-6
- Hymn to the Rebel Cafe (1993)
- Chekhov (1995)
- 1968: A History in Verse (1997)
- America, A History in Verse, Vol. 1 (1900–1939) (2000)
- The Poetry and Life of Allen Ginsberg, The Overlook Press (2000)
- America, A History in Verse, Vol. 2 (1940–1961) (2001)
- America, A History in Verse, Vol. 3 (1962–1970) (2004)
- "Poems for New Orleans" (2004)
- Thirsting for Peace in a Raging Century, Selected Poems (1961–1985) (2009)
- Let's Not Keep Fighting the Trojan War, New and Selected Poems (1986–2009) (2009)
- "Edward Sanders | Glyphs" The Brother in Elysium (2011)
- Ed Sanders (December 13, 2011). Fug You: An Informal History of the Peace Eye Bookstore, the Fuck You Press, the Fugs, and Counterculture in the Lower East Side. Da Capo Press. ISBN 978-0-306-81943-8.
- "A Book of Glyphs (trade edition) Granary Books (2014)
- A Book of Glyphs (limited edition) Granary Books (2014)
- Glyph Notes: Commentary on A Book of Glyphs (pdf of booklet included with the limited edition) Granary Books (2014)
- Sharon Tate: A Life (2015)
- Broken Glory: The Final Years of Robert F. Kennedy Arcade Publishing (2018) illustrated by Rick Veitch

== Selected solo discography ==
- Sanders' Truckstop 1969
- Beer Cans on the Moon 1972
- Yiddish-speaking socialists of the Lower East Side 1991
- Songs in ancient Greek 1992
- American Bard 1996
- Thirsting for Peace 2005
- Poems for New Orleans 2007
- Surreal Housewives of Woodstock 2011 (never released, with Jules Shear)
- The Sanders-Olufsen Poetry and Classical Music Project 2023
- Ed Sanders and The Plastic People of the Universe - The Garden is Open - In Concert at the Prague Writers Festival 2005 Released 2024
- Ed Sanders - Rare and Unreleased Recordings 1965-99 - 4 CD BOX Set in Hardcover Book Format Released 2024
- Ed Sanders - The Secret Index to the Past (Olufsen Records) 2026

== Discography with the Fugs ==
- See Fugs Discography

== See also ==
- List of peace activists
- Poetry in Motion (1982)
- Woodstock Journal

== Bibliography ==
- Charters, Ann (ed.). The Portable Beat Reader. Penguin Books. New York. 1992. ISBN 0-670-83885-3
