= Aníbal Kerpel =

- Origin: Argentina
- Occupations: Producer, engineer and mixer
- Years active: 1974-present

Aníbal Kerpel is an Argentine producer, engineer and mixer. A member of the progressive rock band Crucis, he began a successful career as a producer after the split of the band, working with artists such as Los Prisioneros, Café Tacvba, Divididos, Molotov, Gustavo Santaolalla, Bersuit Vergarabat, Juanes and Árbol, among others. During his career he has received a Grammy Award and over ten Latin Grammy Awards.

== Career ==
Kerpel was one of the members of the progressive rock band Crucis, playing the keyboards. The band released two studio albums, Crucis in 1976 and Los Delirios del Mariscal in 1977, before splitting in 1977. After the end of the band, Kerpel began working as producer for various artists, many times co-producing with Argentine musician Gustavo Santaolalla. In 1985, he worked as assistant producer on the album De Ushuaia a La Quiaca by León Gieco. The project was produced by Santaolalla and recorded in various parts of Argentina.

In 1990, he produced Corazones alongside Santaolalla, the fourth studio album by Chilean band Los Prisioneros. The album was recorded in California and included some of the band's most famous songs like "Estrechez de Corazón" and "Tren al Sur". In 1992, Kerpel participated as associate producer on the debut album by Mexican band Café Tacvba, also known as Café Tacuba. This would be the first of many collaborations with the band. During the 1990s, Kerpel worked as engineer and assistant producer on many albums including La Era de la Boludez by Divididos, the self-titled debut solo album by Jorge González, Re, Avalancha de Éxitos and Revés/Yo Soy by Café Tacvba and ¿Dónde Jugarán las Niñas? by Molotov. In 1997, Kerpel founded Surco Records with Santaolalla, a record label in conjunction with Universal Music.

In 2000, he worked as engineer on Fijate Bien, the debut studio album by Colombian singer Juanes. At the 2nd Annual Latin Grammy Awards, the album was nominated for Album of the Year while the song "Fijate Bien" was nominated for Record of the Year. In 2002, he worked again with Juanes as engineer working on Un Día Normal. At the 4th Annual Latin Grammy Awards, the album would go on to win Album of the Year with the song "Es Por Ti" winning Record of the Year. Additionally, Kerpel received nominations for his work with Molotov, these being for Record of the Year and Best Rock Album by a Duo or Group with Vocal, for "Frijolero" and Dance and Dense Denso respectively. In 2003, Kerpel participated in Café Tacvba's fourth album Cuatro Caminos. The album won the Grammy Award for Best Latin Rock/Alternative Performance at the 46th Annual Grammy Awards in 2004. The album also was nominated for Album of the Year at the 5th Annual Latin Grammy Awards, this being Kerpel's third nomination in the category.

After also working on Mi Sangre (2004), Kerpel worked once again with Juanes as engineer for La Vida... Es Un Ratico (2007), receiving for a second time the Latin Grammy Award for Album of the Year. Since then, Kerpel has received several Latin Grammy Awards and nominations, including a nomination for Producer of the Year with Gustavo Santaolalla in 2015.

Kerpel has also worked as engineer and mixer on various occasions for film scores composed by Gustavo Santaolalla, including Amores Perros (2000), 21 Grams (2003), Babel (2006) and Biutiful (2011), all directed by Alejandro González Iñarritu, Walter Salles's The Motorcycle Diaries (2004) and Ang Lee's Brokeback Mountain (2005). He has also collaborated on the music for the video game The Last of Us, also composed by Santaolalla.

== Discography ==
Year	Title	Artist	Production	Technical	Instruments
1981	Better Luck (A)	The Plugz			check
1985	De Ushuaia a La Quiaca (A)	León Gieco	check		check
1990	Corazones (A)	Los Prisioneros	check		
1991	El Circo (A)	Maldita Vecindad y los Hijos del Quinto Patio			check
1992	Café Tacuba (A)	Café Tacvba	check		
1993	La Era de la Boludez (A)	Divididos	check		check
1993	Jorge González (A)	Jorge González	check	check	
1994	Re (A)	Café Tacvba	check	check	
1995	De La Guarda (A)	De La Guarda	check	check	
1995	Amor Chiquito (A)	Fobia	check		check
1996	Avalancha de Éxitos (A)	Café Tacvba	check	check	
1996	Divididos (A)	Divididos	check		check
1997	¿Dónde Jugarán las Niñas? (A)	Molotov	check		check
1997	Aquí (A)	Julieta Venegas	check	check	
1998	Árbol (A)	Árbol	check		
1998	Libertinaje (A)	Bersuit Vergarabat	check	check	
1998	Ronroco (A)	Gustavo Santaolalla	check	check	check
1999	Apocalypshit (A)	Molotov	check	check	
1999	Fundamental (A)	Puya	check	check	
1999	Revés/Yo Soy (A)	Café Tacvba	check	check	
2000	Amores Perros (A)	Gustavo Santaolalla	check	check	
2000	Caravan (A)	Kronos Quartet	check		
2000	Hijos del Culo (A)	Bersuit Vergarabat	check	check	check
2000	Bueninvento (A)	Julieta Venegas	check		
2000	Fíjate Bien (A)	Juanes		check	check
2002	"Es Por Ti" (S)	Juanes		check	
2002	De Bichos y Flores (A)	La Vela Puerca		check	check
2002	Nuevo (A)	Kronos Quartet	check	check	
2002	Un Día Normal (A)	Juanes	check	check	
2002	Vale Callampa (EP)	Café Tacvba	check	check	
2002	Bajofondo Tango Club (A)	Bajofondo		check	check
2002	De la Cabeza con Bersuit Vergarabat (A)	Bersuit Vergarabat		check	
2002	Chapusongs (A)	Árbol			check
2002	Dance and Dense Denso (A)	Molotov	check	check	check
2003	"Frijolero"	Molotov	check		
2003	21 Grams (A)	Gustavo Santaolalla	check	check	
2003	Amorama (A)	Erica García	check	check	check
2003	Cuatro Caminos (A)	Café Tacvba	check	check	
2003	Carnabalito (A)	Gaby Kerpel	check		
2004	La Argentinidad al Palo (A)	Bersuit Vergarabat		check	check
2004	The Motorcycle Diaries (A)	Gustavo Santaolalla		check	check
2004	A Contraluz (A)	La Vela Puerca			check
2004	Guau! (A)	Árbol	check		
2004	Mi Sangre (A)	Juanes	check	check	check
2005	13 (A)	Javier García	check	check	check
2005	Brokeback Mountain (A)	Gustavo Santaolalla	check	check	check
2005	North Country (A)	Gustavo Santaolalla		check	check
2005	Café de los Mestros (A)	Various artists		check	
2005	Testosterona	Bersuit Vergarabat	check	check	check
2006	"A Dios le Pido" (S)	Juanes		check	
2006	Ananda (A)	Paulina Rubio		check	
2006	Babel (A)	Gustavo Santaolalla		check	
2007	La Vida... Es Un Ratico (A)	Juanes		check	
2007	Mar Dulce (A)	Bajofondo	check	check	check
2007	Sino (A)	Café Tacvba	check		
2009	Cantora 1 (A)	Mercedes Sosa		check	
2011	Biutiful (A)	Gustavo Santaolalla	check	check	check
2012	El Objeto Antes Llamado Disco (A)	Café Tacvba	check		
2013	Presente (A)	Bajofondo	check	check	check
2013	The Last of Us (A)	Gustavo Santaolalla	check	check	
2013	August: Osage County (A)	Gustavo Santaolalla	check		
2014	Camino (A)	Gustavo Santaolalla	check	check	check
2014	The Book of Life (A)	Gustavo Santaolalla	check	check	
2017	Jei Beibi (A)	Café Tacvba	check	check	
2019	Los Tigres del Norte at Folsom Prison (A)	Los Tigres del Norte	check	check	
2019	Un Segundo MTV Unplugged (A)	Café Tacvba	check		

(A) Album, (S), Single

== Awards and nominations ==
=== Grammy Awards ===
Year	Category	Work	Artist	Result	Ref.
1998	Best Latin Rock/Alternative Performance	¿Dónde Jugarán las Niñas? (as producer)	Molotov	Nominated	
2004	Best Latin Rock/Alternative Performance	Dance and Dense Denso (as producer and engineer)	Molotov	Nominated	
2004	Best Latin Rock/Alternative Performance	Cuatro Caminos (as engineer)	Café Tacvba	Won	

=== Latin Grammy Awards ===
Año	Categoría	Trabajo	Artista	Resultado	Ref.
2000	Best Rock Album	Revés/Yo Soy (as producer and engineer)	Café Tacvba	Won	
2000	Best Engineered Album	Revés/Yo Soy (as producer and engineer)	Café Tacvba	Nominated	
2001	Album of the Year	Fijate Bien (as engineer)	Juanes	Nominated	
2001	Best Rock Solo Vocal Album	Fijate Bien (as engineer)	Juanes	Won	
2001	Record of the Year	"Fijate Bien" (as engineer)	Juanes	Nominated	
2003	Album of the Year	Un Día Normal	Juanes	Won	
2003	Best Rock Solo Vocal Album	Un Día Normal	Juanes	Won	
2003	Record of the Year	"Es Por Ti" (as engineer)	Juanes	Won	
2003	Record of the Year	"Frijolero" (as engineer)	Molotov	Nominated	
2003	Best Classical Album	Nuevo (as producer and engineer)	Kronos Quartet	Nominated	
2004	Album of the Year	Cuatro Caminos (as engineer)	Café Tacvba	Nominated	
2004	Best Alternative Music Album	Cuatro Caminos (as engineer)	Café Tacvba	Won	
2005	Best Rock Solo Vocal Album	Mi Sangre (as engineer)	Juanes	Won	
2006	Best Tango Album	Café de Los Maestros (as engineer)	Various artists	Won	
2008	Album of the Year	La Vida... Es Un Ratico (as engineer)	Juanes	Won	
2008	Best Male Pop Vocal Album	La Vida... Es Un Ratico (as engineer)	Juanes	Won	
2008	Record of the Year	"Me Enamora"	Juanes	Won	
2009	Album of the Year	Cantora 1 (as engineer)	Mercedes Sosa	Nominated	
2013	Album of the Year	Presente (as engineer)	Bajofondo	Nominated	
2013	Best Instrumental Album	Presente (as engineer)	Bajofondo	Won	
2015	Producer of the Year	Aníbal Kerpel (shared with Gustavo Santaolalla)		Nominated	
2017	Best Alternative Music Album	Jei Beibi (as engineer)	Café Tacvba	Nominated	
2020	Record of the Year	"Solari Yacumenza" (as engineer)	Bajofondo with Cuareim 1080	Nominated	
2020	Best Norteño Album	Los Tigres del Norte at Folsom Prison (as engineer)	Los Tigres del Norte	Won	
