= Un Segundo MTV Unplugged =

Live album by Café Tacuba
- Released: October 22, 2019
- Recorded: March 5, 2019
- Venues: Sala Nezahualcóyotl, UNAM
- Genre: Alternative music
- Length: 78:04
- Language: Spanish
- Label: Universal Music Mexico
- Producers: Gustavo Santaolalla, Aníbal Kerpel

Café Tacuba chronology
Jei Beibi (2017)	Un Segundo MTV Unplugged (2019)

Un Segundo MTV Unplugged is the third live album by Mexican rock band Cafe Tacuba, released on October 22, 2019, through Universal Music Mexico. It was recorded on March 5, 2019, at the Sala Nezahualcóyotl of the National Autonomous University of Mexico (UNAM) and features production from Gustavo Santaolalla and Aníbal Kerpel, and musical guests such as David Byrne and Monsieur Periné's Catalina García.

The album is the band's second album for the MTV series MTV Unplugged, after their 2005 live album, this makes them the first Latinamerican band with more than one live album in the series.

At the 22nd Annual Latin Grammy Awards, the album received nominations for Best Alternative Music Album and Best Long Form Music Video.

== Track listing ==
All tracks were produced by Gustavo Santaolalla and Aníbal Kerpel, and written by Café Tacuba (Emmanuel Del Real, Enrique Rangel, Rubén Albarrán, Joselo Rangel), except when noted.

No.	Title	Writer(s)	Original release	Length
1.	"La 11"		Revés/Yo Soy	4:27
2.	"El Espacio"		Revés/Yo Soy	5:25
3.	"La Locomotora"		Revés/Yo Soy	4:01
4.	"Las Batallas/Rarotonga"		Café Tacuba	5:26
5.	"Mediodía"		Cuatro Caminos	4:45
6.	"Enamorada" (featuring Catalina García)		Jei Beibi	4:28
7.	"EO"		Cuatro Caminos	2:27
8.	"Quiero Ver"		Sino	3:38
9.	"El Outsider" (featuring David Byrne)		Sino	5:04
10.	"Vaivén"		Jei Beibi	4:59
11.	"Muerte Chiquita"		Revés/Yo Soy	3:55
12.	"Olita de Altamar" (featuring Gustavo Santaolalla)		El Objeto Antes Llamado Disco	5:10
13.	"Diente de León"		Jei Beibi	6:12
14.	"Eres"		Cuatro Caminos	5:05
15.	"Chilanga Banda"	Jaime López	Avalancha de Éxitos	3:58
16.	"Volver a Comenzar"		Sino	8:10
17.	"Cantito"	Rubén Albarrán	Bonus Track	3:16
Total length:				78:04
