= Tiempo Transcurrido =

Greatest hits album by Café Tacuba
- Released: August 21, 2001
- Recorded: 1992–1999
- Genre: Latin Alternative, rock en español
- Length: 1:14:32
- Label: Warner Music Group
- Producer: Café Tacuba

Café Tacuba chronology
Revés/Yo Soy (1999)	Tiempo Transcurrido (2001)	Vale Callampa (2002)

Professional ratings
Review scores
Source	Rating
Allmusic	4/5 stars

Tiempo Transcurrido ("Running Time") is Café Tacuba's first compilation album, released in 2001. According to the band, it was released due to a contractual obligation, as the original contract signed with WEA Latina stated that they must release five albums, and with no new material, Tiempo Transcurrido dropped in music stores on August 21. The album itself chronicles Café Tacuba's work in reverse order, starting with Revés (originally titled "13" on Revés/Yo Soy) and ending with "La Dos." The only new song on this compilation is a live rendition of "El Baile Y El Salón." The album cover is noted for referencing each of their four albums up to that point, with the debut album cover being reversed and superimposed over the other three album covers.

== Band members ==
- Ñru (Rubén Albarrán): vocals, guitar
- Emmanuel del Real: keyboards, acoustic guitar, piano, programming, vocals, melodeon
- Joselo Rangel: electric guitar, acoustic guitar, vocals
- Quique Rangel: bass guitar, electric upright bass, vocals

== Track listing ==
All tracks are written by Café Tacvba (except where noted)

No.	Title	Writer(s)	Original Album	Length
1.	"Revés" (aka "13") (Edit)	R. Albarrán, E. del Real, J.A. Rangel, E. Rangel	Revés	3:59
2.	"La Locomotora"	E. del Real	Yo Soy	3:52
3.	"La Muerte Chiquita"	E. Rangel	Yo Soy	2:52
4.	"Dos Niños"	J.A. Rangel	Yo Soy	3:29
5.	"No Controles"	Ignacio Cano	Avalancha De Exitos	3:07
6.	"Ojalá Que Llueva Café"	Juan Luis Guerra	Avalancha De Exitos	3:27
7.	"Cómo Te Extraño Mi Amor"	Leo Dan	Avalancha De Exitos	3:40
8.	"Chilanga Banda"	Juan Jaime López	Avalancha De Exitos	3:32
9.	"El Ciclón"	E. del Real, R. Albarrán	Re	2:55
10.	"Las Flores"	E. del Real	Re	2:15
11.	"Esa Noche"	J. A. Rangel, E. Rangel	Re	3:26
12.	"La Ingrata"	E. del Real	Re	3:31
13.	"El Puñal y el Corazón"	R. Albarrán	Re	4:21
14.	"El Baile y el Salón" (Live)	J. A. Rangel, E. del Real	Previously unreleased. Original version on Re	5:08
15.	"El Aparato"	R. Albarrán	Re	3:19
16.	"Pinche Juan"	R. Albarrán	Café Tacvba	0:39
17.	"Rarotonga"	J.A. Rangel, E. del Real	Café Tacvba	2:49
18.	"Las Batallas"	E. Rangel	Café Tacvba	3:23
19.	"Las Persianas"	R. Albarrán	Café Tacvba	2:53
20.	"María"	J.A. Rangel	Café Tacvba	3:52
21.	"La Chica Banda"	R. Albarrán, E. del Real, J.A. Rangel, E. Rangel	Café Tacvba	3:50
22.	"La Dos" (aka "2") (Edit)	R. Albarrán, E. del Real, J.A. Rangel, E. Rangel	Revés	3:44
