= Bienvenido al Sueño =

Studio album by Sizu Yantra (Rubén Albarrán)
- Released: 2006
- Genre: Electronic, Experimental
- Label: Universal Music
- Producer: Rubén Albarrán, Ulises Pascual

Bienvenido al Sueño is a 2006 studio album released by Sizu Yantra, a pseudonym used by Mexican musician Rubén Albarrán, best known as the frontman of the alternative rock band Café Tacvba. The album is a collaboration with his wife, credited as Psykini (Amanda Pascual).

It was released during a hiatus of Café Tacvba, during which the band members dispersed to work on personal artistic projects.

== Background and recording ==
The album was produced by Albarrán and his brother-in-law, Ulises Pascual. Albarrán stated in an interview that it was created to celebrate the birth of his first child.

Following the tour for Cuatro Caminos (2003) and the 15th-anniversary concert Un Viaje (2005), the members of Café Tacvba agreed to take a break to focus on individual endeavors. While guitarist Joselo Rangel released his second solo album Lejos (2006), Albarrán adopted the moniker "Sizu Yantra" to release Bienvenido al Sueño.

== Musical style ==
In contrast to the alternative rock and folk-fusion sounds typical of Café Tacvba, Bienvenido al Sueño is primarily an electronic and instrumental album. It features programmed beats, ambient textures, and synthesizers, with Albarrán and Psykini providing vocals that often function more as atmospheric instruments than traditional lyrical delivery.

The tracks incorporate influences from Eastern philosophies and meditative practices, evident in song titles referencing mantras and Buddhist concepts (e.g., "Tayata Om..." and "Yatha Butha Ñana Dhassana").

== Track listing ==
All tracks are written by Sizu Yantra and Psykini.

No.	Title	Length
1.	"Buendía"	3:03
2.	"Solo a Él"	3:21
3.	"Tayata Om Bhaykandze Bhaykandze maha Bhaykandze Randza Samugate Soha"	5:17
4.	"Bienvenido"	3:05
5.	"Jardines"	4:51
6.	"Psykini"	3:43
7.	"Yantra"	3:07
8.	"Cada Tres Horas"	3:44
9.	"Yatha Butha Ñana Dhassana"	3:28
10.	"Sueños"	4:26
11.	"Bardo"	20:02

== Personnel ==
- Sizu Yantra (Rubén Albarrán) – vocals, programming, production
- Psykini (Amanda Pascual) – vocals, chorus, creative collaboration
- Ulises Pascual – production
