= Break It All: The History of Rock in Latin America =

2020 American television docuseries

- Genre: Documentary
- Starring: Rubén Albarrán; Humberto Carderon; Gustavo Santaolalla
- Country of origin: United States
- Original language: Spanish
- No. of seasons: 1
- No. of episodes: 6

Production
- Running time: 45–55 minutes

Original release
- Network: Netflix
- Release: December 16, 2020

Break It All: The History of Rock in Latin America is a 2020 docuseries starring Rubén Albarrán, Humberto Carderon and Gustavo Santaolalla.

== Cast ==
- Rubén Albarrán
- Humberto Carderon
- Gustavo Santaolalla
- Javier Batiz
- Tito Fuentes
- Aníbal Kerpel
- Roco Pachukote
- Paco Ayala
- Hector Buitrago
- Andrés Calamaro
- Andrea Echeverri
- León Gieco
- Álvaro Henríquez
- Camilo Lara
- Lino Nava
- Fernando 'Fher' Olvera

== Episodes ==
No.	Title	Original release date
1	"Episode 1"	December 16, 2020
2	"Episode 2"	December 16, 2020
3	"Episode 3"	December 16, 2020
4	"Episode 4"	December 16, 2020
5	"Episode 5"	December 16, 2020
6	"Episode 6"	December 16, 2020

== Release ==
Break It All: The History of Rock in Latin America was released on December 16, 2020, on Netflix.
