= Eres (Café Tacuba song) =

Single by Café Tacuba

from the album Cuatro Caminos
- Language: Spanish
- English title: "You Are"
- Released: 11 November 2003
- Genre: Alternative rock; pop rock
- Length: 4:27
- Label: Universal Music México
- Songwriter: Emmanuel del Real
- Producer: Gustavo Santaolalla

Café Tacuba singles chronology
| "Cero y Uno" (2003) | "Eres" (2003) | "Puntos Cardinales" (2004) |

"Eres" (English: "You Are") is a song by Mexican band Café Tacuba from their fifth studio album Cuatro Caminos (2003). The song was written by Emmanuel del Real and was produced by Argentine producer Gustavo Santaolalla. It was released on 11 November 2003 through Universal Music México as the album's third single following "Eo" and "Cero y Uno".

The song featured on the band's first live album Un Viaje (2005), as well as their third, Un Segundo MTV Unplugged (2019), recorded at the Sala Nezahualcóyotl in the National Autonomous University of Mexico, the song was one of the three songs from Cuatro Caminos that were included in the latter album, alongside "Eo" and "Mediodía".

At the 5th Annual Latin Grammy Awards, the song received nominations for Song of the Year and Best Short Form Music Video (losing to Alejandro Sanz's "No Es Lo Mismo" and Draco Rosa's "Más y Más", respectively) and won Best Rock Song.

The song peaked at number 38 in the Billboard Latin Pop Airplay chart, being one of the two appearances of the band in the chart, the other being "No Hay Nadie Como Tú", their collaboration with the Puerto Rican band Calle 13 which peaked at number 13.

== Background and reception ==
According to the band, the song is a "total declaration of love", specifically the "high school love", hence, the theme of the music video for the song. José Alfredo Rangel Arroyo, the band's guitarist, said that the song, alongside "Ingrata", was "one of the most romantic songs by Café Tacuba", commenting that "people have fallen in love to the song, have tattoed the lyrics..., that's when one realizes that some topics are part of the people, of their lives, of their body".

In a retrospective of the album Cuatro Caminos for its fifteenth anniversary, José Marr from IndieRocks! wrote that the song would be the one for which Emmanuel del Real's voice and role as a songwriter in the band will be remembered, likening the song to a version in Spanish of Oasis's 1995 song "Wonderwall". While reviewing the album for Pitchfork, Alexander Lloyd Linhardt wrote that "Eres" is "unabashedly classic 70s rock, a sun-splattered villa with the best Spanish guitar line in a rock song since Naked Raygun's "Vanilla Blue"". On another review of the album, Enrique Lavin for Blender called the song alongside "Encantamiento", a "timeless pop song that speaks about urban existentialism". Lauren Cocking from Culture Trip included the song in a list of thirteen songs that serve as an introduction for the band, describing "Eres" as "perhaps the most emblematic of all the Café Tacuba songs" and a "modern classic of a love song".

== Music video ==
The music video was directed by Mexican director Rogelio Sikander and produced by Rodrigo Valdés from the company Los Maestros, the band contacted Sikander to direct the video after watching his previous work in Molotov's "Here We Kum" and Zoé's "Peace and Love", the video featured cinematography by Gerardo Madrazo and drawings Daniel Guzmán and José Luis Sánchez Rul, which were animated using the software Shake.

The video shows a teenager (Emmanuel Vega) who is in love with one of his classmates (Berenice Escandon) but is unable to confess it to her, as the video progresses a series of drawings begin to appear all over the classroom filling with color a previously black and white video, expressing the love he feels for her matching with the romantic lyrics of the song, the video ends with him smiling at the girl as the drawings begin to disappear.

As of 2021, the video has over 400 million views on YouTube. The video was nominated for the Latin Grammy Award for Best Short Form Music Video, won Video of the Year at the MTV Video Music Awards Latinoamérica 2004 and received awards for Best Music Video, Best Director, Best Screenplay and Best Post-Production at the Pantalla de Cristal Film Festival.

== Charts ==
| Chart (2003) | Peak position |
|---|---|
| Billboard Latin Pop Airplay | 38 |

== Covers versions ==
In October 2014 the Tokyo Ska Paradise released Ska Me Forever Mexican Edition which includes an arrangement of "Eres".
