= Joselo Rangel =

- Born: José Alfredo Rangel Arroyo; September 1, 1967 (age 58); Minatitlán, Veracruz, Mexico
- Genres: Alternative rock, Rock en español, Electronic music
- Occupations: Composer, writer
- Instruments: Guitar, vocals
- Years active: 1989–present
- Labels: Universal Music, Warner Music
- Member of: Café Tacvba

José Alfredo "Joselo" Rangel Arroyo (born 1967) is a Mexican musician, composer, and writer. He is best known as the guitarist and vocalist of the alternative rock band Café Tacvba. Apart from his work with the band, he has released solo albums and established a career as a fiction writer and columnist.

== Biography ==
Rangel was born in Minatitlán, Veracruz, Mexico. He spent his early childhood there before his family moved to Mexico City. He studied Industrial design at the Metropolitan Autonomous University (UAM) Azcapotzalco campus. It was during his time at university that he met Rubén Albarrán.

== Musical career ==
=== Café Tacvba ===
In 1989, Joselo co-founded Café Tacvba along with his brother, bassist Quique Rangel, vocalist Rubén Albarrán, and keyboardist Emmanuel del Real. Joselo is the primary songwriter for several of the band's most successful hits, including "María", "Esa Noche", "El Baile y el Salón", and "Rarotonga".

=== Solo work ===
During breaks in Café Tacvba's schedule, Rangel has released solo material that explores different sonic territories, often leaning into electronic and acoustic rock.

- Oso (2001): His debut solo album, named after his childhood nickname. Produced by his bandmate Emmanuel del Real.
- Lejos (2006): Recorded in Chile and produced by Álvaro Henríquez of the band Los Tres.

He has also worked as a music producer for other Mexican bands, including Renoh.

== Literary career ==
In addition to music, Rangel is a published author and journalist. He wrote the weekly column "Crócknicas Marcianas" for the Mexican newspaper Excélsior, where he discussed music, culture, and daily life. He has also contributed to magazines such as Gatopardo and Día Siete.

His literary works include short story collections and novels, often characterized by their focus on music, youth culture, and urban life.

- Crócknicas Marcianas (2011): A compilation of his newspaper columns.
- One Hit Wonder (2015): A collection of short stories focusing on the rock music scene.
- Cuba Stone (2016): A chronicle co-authored with Jeremías Gamboa and Javier Sinay covering the Rolling Stones' historic concert in Havana.
- Los Desesperados (2018): A novel about a fictional rock band in Mexico City, incorporating themes of sci-fi and the supernatural.
- La niña aburrida (2020): A children's book illustrated by Nori Kobayashi.

== Discography ==
=== With Café Tacvba ===
- See Café Tacvba discography

=== Solo albums ===
- Oso (2001)
- Lejos (2006)

== Bibliography ==
- Crócknicas marcianas (2011, Rhythm and Books)
- One hit wonder (2015, Almadía)
- Los desesperados (2018, Seix Barral)
- La niña aburrida (2020, Planeta Junior)
