= MTV Unplugged (Café Tacuba album) =

Live album by Café Tacvba

Unplugged Café Tacvba

Live album by Café Tacvba
- Released: June 7, 2005
- Recorded: 1995
- Genres: Latin, Rock en español
- Length: 53:15
- Label: Warner Music Latina
- Producers: Gustavo Santaolalla and Alejandro Pels

Café Tacvba chronology
Un Viaje (2005)	Unplugged Café Tacvba (2005)	Sino (2007)

Unplugged Café Tacvba is a complete live album (ninth overall) that was recorded in 1995 and released in 2005 as a CD/ DVD combo by Mexican alternative rock group Café Tacvba. Café Tacvba was the first Mexican rock band to ever appear on MTV Unplugged twice. The live performance was recorded in 1995 and released on CD and DVD in 5.1 surround sound on June 7, 2005. The MTV Unplugged album includes the selections "El Metro," "La Ingrata," "Esa Noche," "Una Manana," "Bar Tacuba," and others.

== Track listing ==
No.	Title	Length
1.	"El Aparato"	4:44
2.	"La Ingrata"	3:57
3.	"El Metro"	3:37
4.	"Esa Noche" (featuring Gustavo Santaolalla on guitar)	3:59
5.	"Maria"	4:15
6.	"El Ciclón"	5:27
7.	"Bar Tacuba"	4:16
8.	"El Baile y el Salón" (featuring Gustavo Santaolalla on guitar)	6:54
9.	"Las Flores" (featuring Alejandro Flores on violin)	7:18
10.	"El Puñal y el Corazón"	4:54
11.	"Una Mañana" (José José cover)	3:22
12.	"La Chica Banda"	5:04
Total length:		53:15

== Unplugged Café Tacuba DVD ==
MTV Unplugged Café Tacuba

Video by Café Tacvba
- Released: June 7, 2005
- Recorded: 1995
- Genres: Rock en Español, Latin Pop
- Label: Warner Music Latina

Café Tacvba chronology
Un Viaje (2005)	MTV Unplugged Café Tacuba (2005)	Sino (2007)

A DVD which included several interviews of guests and others involved in the show was also released.
