= Crucis (band) =

Argentine progressive rock band

- Origin: Argentina
- Genres: Progressive rock Symphonic rock
- Years active: 1974–1977
- Labels: RCA Argentina; BMG Argentina
- Members: Pino Marrone; Gonzalo Farrugia; Gustavo Montesano; Aníbal Kerpel
- Past members: José Luis Fernández; Daniel Leonardo Frenkel; Daniel Oil

Crucis was an Argentine band considered one of the pioneers of the Argentine progressive rock.

== History ==
Crucis was formed in 1974 by Gustavo Montesano (guitar, vocals), José Luis Fernández (bass), Daniel Leonardo Frenkel (drums) and Daniel Oil (keyboards). When Fernández left the band, Montesano became the new bass player. Later on Pino Marrone and Aníbal Kerpel joined the band. In 1975 Daniel Leonardo Frenkel left the band and Gonzalo Farrugia replaced him. They released two albums, Crucis in 1976 (produced by Charly García who was very famous in Argentina at the time after the demise of folk rock band Sui Generis) and Los Delirios del Mariscal in 1977. The band dissolved shortly after. Both their LPs were put together in a single CD entitled Cronología for re-release in 1996. Some reissues include 2 bonus tracks which the band recorded for a projected single in 1977. Crucis also played on Montesano's first solo album Homenaje that year. Montesano later joined the successful Spanish pop band Olé Olé.

== Discography ==
Crucis

- Recorded in studio in 1976, it contained the following tracks.
1. "Todo tiempo posible"
2. "Mes"
3. "Corto Amanecer"
4. "La triste visión del entierro propio"
5. "Irónico ser"
6. "Determinados espejos"
7. "Recluso artista"

Los Delirios del Mariscal

- Recorded in studio in 1977, it contained the following tracks.
1. "No me separen de mí"
2. "Los Delirios del Mariscal"
3. "Pollo Frito"
4. "Abismo Terrenal"

Delirios en el Luna

- Bootleg live recorded in Luna Park 01/04/1977, it contained the following tracks.
1. "No me separen de mí"
2. "Mes"
3. "La triste visión del entierro propio"
4. "Vuelo a la obsesión"
5. "Determinados espejos"
6. "Los delirios del mariscal"
7. "Abismo terrenal"

Cronología

- Sometimes spelled Kronología, this compilation album was released in 1996, which contained the following tracks.
1. "Todo tiempo posible"
2. "Mes"
3. "Corto amanecer"
4. "La triste visión del entierro propio"
5. "Irónico ser"
6. "Determinados espejos"
7. "Recluso artista"
8. "No me separen de mi"
9. "Los delirios del mariscal"
10. "Pollo frito"
11. "Abismo terrenal"
