= Un Viaje (album) =

Live album by Café Tacvba
- Released: April 19, 2005
- Recorded: October 6 and 7, 2004
- Venue: El Palacio de los Deportes, México D.F.
- Genre: Latin Alternative, Rock en Español
- Label: Universal Music Latino
- Producer: Café Tacvba

Café Tacvba chronology
Cuatro Caminos (2003)	Un Viaje (2005)	Sino (2007)

Professional ratings
Review scores
Source	Rating
Allmusic	3.5/5 stars

Un Viaje is the first live album by the rock band Café Tacvba. It was released in 2005 on Universal Music. The record is the band's seventh overall album, and consists of the songs played at the El Palacio de los Deportes concert. It was bundled with a DVD of the same concert, and included all of the songs present in the CDs.

== Track listings ==
=== Disc 1 ===
No.	Title	Lyrics	Length
1.	"María"	Joselo Rangel	5:38
2.	"Las Batallas" ("The Battles")	Quique Rangel	2:19
3.	"Rarotonga"	J. Rangel/Emmanuel del Real	1:42
4.	"Noche Oscura" ("Dark Night")	Rubén Albarrán/E. del Real	4:05
5.	"Cero y Uno" ("Zero and One")	J. Rangel	4:49
6.	"No Controles" ("Don't Control")	Nacho Cano	4:02
7.	"Eo"	E. del Real	2:30
8.	"Puntos Cardenales" ("Cardinal Directions")	R. Albarrán/E. del Real/J. Rangel/E. Rangel	4:51
9.	"Mediodía" ("Noon")	E. Rangel	4:08
10.	"Eres" ("You Are")	E. del Real	4:40
11.	"Esa Noche" ("That Night")	J. Rangel/E. Rangel	4:28
12.	"Ojalá que Llueva Café" ("Hope It Rains Coffee")	Juan Luis Guerra	5:38
13.	"La 2"	instrumental	4:53
14.	"La 6"	instrumental	2:50
15.	"Revés" ("Backwards")	R. Albarrán/E. del Real/J. Rangel/E. Rangel	2:42

=== Disc 2 ===
No.	Title	Lyrics	Length
1.	"El Fin de la Infancia" ("Childhood's End")	J. Rangel	2:32
2.	"La Locomotora" ("The Locomotive")	E. del Real	4:01
3.	"Las Persianas" ("The Persian Blinds")	R. Albarrán	3:01
4.	"Chilanga Banda" ("Mexico City Band")	Juan Jaime López	3:40
5.	"Labios Jaguar (featuring Patricio Iglesias from Santa Sabina (band))" ("Jaguar Lips")	R. Albarrán	4:08
6.	"La Chica Banda (featuring Lino Nava from La Lupita)" ("The Band Girl")	R. Albarrán/E. del Real/J. Rangel/E. Rangel	8:09
7.	"Déjate Caer" ("Let Yourself Fall")	Álvaro Henríquez/Roberto Lindl	9:32
8.	"Aviéntame" ("Throw Me")	R. Albarrán/E. del Real/J. Rangel	3:05
9.	"El Espacio" ("Space")	E. del Real	4:24
10.	"El Puñal y el Corazón" ("The Dagger and the Heart")	R. Albarrán	4:39
11.	"Las Flores (interpolating "La Huasanga")" ("The Flowers")	E. del Real	6:06
12.	"Cómo te Extraño" ("How I Miss You")	Leo Dan	6:46
13.	"La Ingrata" ("The Ingrate")	E. del Real	4:07
14.	"Pinche Juan" ("Fucking Juan")	R. Albarrán	4:24

=== Disc 3 ===
No.	Title	Lyrics	Length
1.	"El Baile y El Salón" ("The Dance and the Hall")	J. Rangel, E. del Real	8:12
2.	"El Borrego" ("The Sheep")	E. del Real	4:38
3.	"Tírate" ("Throw Yourself")	Á. Henríquez	3:08
4.	"La Muerte Chiquita" ("The Little Death")	E. Rangel	3:08
5.	"Amor Violento" ("Violent Love")	Á. Henríquez	4:32
6.	"Cuéntame" ("Tell Me")	J. Rangel	3:39
7.	"Popurrock: "El Son de la Negra"; "Pachuco"; "Dormir Soñando"; "Mala Vida; "El Matador"; "Deléctrico"; "Lamento Boliviano"; "Bolero Falaz"; "Viento"; "Triste Canción""	Traditional mariachi song Maldita Vecindad; Tony Hernández; Manu Chao; Flavio Cianciarulo; Adrián Rodríguez, Diego Rodríguez, Diego Castellano; Dimi Bass, Natalio Faingold; Héctor Buitrago, Andrea Echeverri; Saúl Hernández; Álex Lora	5:32

== Band members ==
- Sizu Yantra (Rubén Albarrán): vocals, guitar
- Emmanuel Del Real: vocals, guitar, jarana, keyboard
- Joselo Rangel: vocals, guitar
- Quique Rangel: vocals, bass guitar

== Charts ==
Chart (2005)	Peak position
US Top Latin Albums (Billboard)	11
US Latin Pop Albums (Billboard)	2

== Sales and certifications ==
Region	Certification	Certified units/sales
Mexico (AMPROFON)	Platinum	100,000^{^}
United States (RIAA)	Platinum (Latin)	100,000^{^}
^{^} Shipments figures based on certification alone.
