= Vale Callampa =

EP by Café Tacvba
- Released: October 29, 2002
- Recorded: El Ensayo, Satélite, México
- Genre: Latin alternative, rock en Español
- Length: 17:18
- Label: MCA
- Producer: Gustavo Santaolalla, Café Tacvba

Café Tacvba chronology
| Revés/Yo Soy (1999) | Vale Callampa (2002) | Cuatro Caminos (2003) |

Professional ratings
Review scores
| Source | Rating |
|---|---|
| Allmusic | 2.5/5 stars |

Vale Callampa is an EP from the Mexican band Café Tacvba. It was released in 2002 and is Café Tacvba's second cover album. Their first, Avalancha de Éxitos, consisted of eight songs from various artists. Vale Callampa, however, is all a tribute to one of Café Tacvba's favorite bands, Chilean rock group Los Tres. This album contains "Déjate Caer", a Los Tres cover, which became a major hit for Café Tacvba due to major airplay as well as for its music video, directed by Ángel Flores-Torres.

== Track listing ==
| No. | Title | Length |
|---|---|---|
| 1. | "Déjate caer" (Let Yourself Fall) | 5:05 |
| 2. | "Olor a gas" (Odor of Gas) | 4:47 |
| 3. | "Amor violento" (Violent Love) | 4:17 |
| 4. | "Tírate" (Throw Yourself) | 3:09 |

== Band members ==
- Rita Cantalagua a.k.a. Gallo Gasss (Rubén Albarrán): vocals
- Emmanuel Del Real: keyboards, programming, jarana, percussions, and background vocals
- Joselo Rangel: guitar and background vocals
- Quique Rangel: bass and background vocals
