= Adolfo Dávila =

Mexican writer, director, and producer

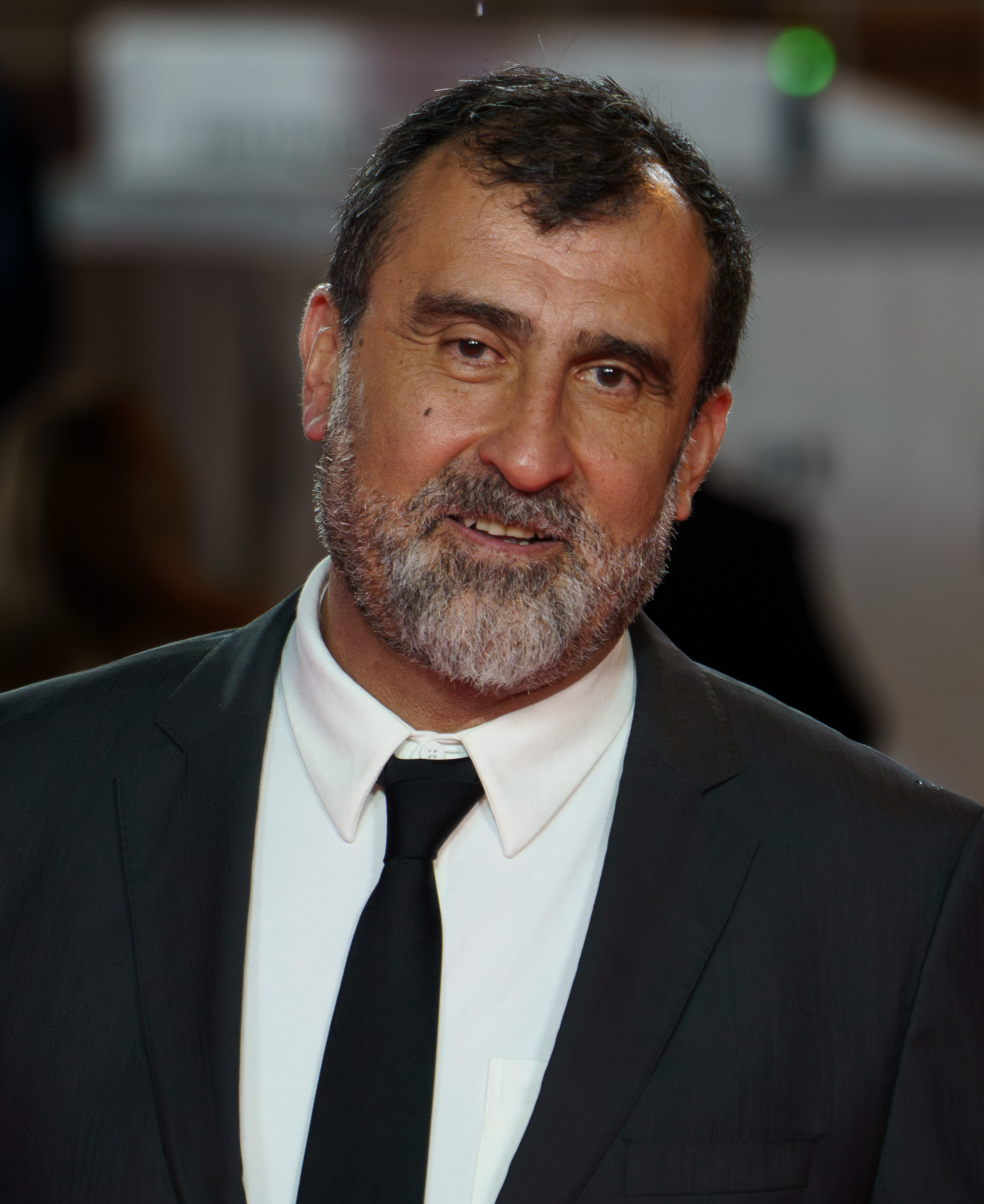
- Born: Mexico
- Occupation: Film director
- Awards: Best Experimental Film (Reves); Grand Chameleon Prize, Williamsburg Brooklyn Film Festival;

Adolfo Dávila is a Mexican writer, director, and producer who has worked on feature films, short films, documentaries, music videos, and commercials.

== Awards ==
Dávila's short film Reves was named Best Experimental Film, and also captured the Grand Chameleon prize at the Brooklyn Film Festival in 2000.

== Filmography ==
- Apizmiki (1989) (Documentary)
- Los Que Se Van (1991) (Documentary)
- OaxaCalifornia (1993) (Documentary)
- Raza (1993) (Documentary)
- Glimpses (1995) (Short Film)
- Merolicos, Magos, Músicos y Mentirosos (1997) (Documentary)
- Revés (1999) (Short Music Video Film for Mexican rock band Café Tacuba)
- El Álbum (2000) (Short Music Video Film for Colombian rock band Aterciopelados)
- Doble Jornada (2007) (Short Film)
- Lluvia de Ideas (2009) (Short Film)
- Los Dos Pérez (2009) (Short Film)
- El Refugio (2013) (Short Film)
- Como Me Veo (2015) (Short Film)
- Ausencia (2023) (Short Film)
- Violentas Mariposas (2024) (Feature Film)
