= 5th Annual Latin Grammy Awards =

Music awards presented Sept 2004

5th Latin Grammy Awards
- Official poster
- Date: September 1, 2004
- Venue: Shrine Auditorium, Los Angeles, California
- Hosted by: George Lopez

Highlights
- Person of the Year: Carlos Santana

Television/radio coverage
- Network: CBS

The 5th Annual Latin Grammy Awards were held on Wednesday, September 1, 2004, at the Shrine Auditorium in Los Angeles.

This was the last telecast of the awards nationally in the United States in English with a CBS contract. Effective in 2005, the awards were announced in Spanish with an exclusive Spanish-language telecast. Alejandro Sanz was the big winner winning four awards including Album of the Year.

== Presenters ==
- Christina Milian, Adam Rodriguez & Jason Ritter - Best New Artist
- Fher Olvera, Maria Menounos & Enrique Murciano - Female Pop Vocal Album
- Xuxa, Daniella Mercury & Cheech Marin - Best MPB Album
- Soraya (musician) - Pays tribute to Celia Cruz
- Tyrese - Presents Roselyn Sanchez
- Amber Tamblyn & Esai Morales - Best Music Video
- The Black Eyed Peas & Wilmer Valderrama - Record of the Year
- Daisy Fuentes & Lynda Lopez - Best Alterative Album
- Constance Marie, Shawn Robinson & Renan Almendarez Coello - Best Regional Album
- Lindsay Lohan & Carlos Santana - Album of the Year

== Performers ==
- Paulina Rubio - Perros
- Jessica Simpson & David Bisbal - Angels (Robbie Williams song)
- Incubus (band) & Cafe Tacuba - Que Pasara & Megalomaniac (Incubus song)
- Roselyn Sanchez, Tyrese & Akwid - Amor Amor
- Carlos Santana & Los Lonely Boys - La Bamba & I Don't Want To Lose Your Love
- Robi Draco Rosa - Mas Y Mas & Madre Tierra
- Ozomatli & George Lopez - Esa Morena
- Marco Antonio Solis - Mas Que Tu Amigo
- Bebo Valdes & Diego El Cigala & Paquito D'Rivera - Lagrimas Negras

== Awards ==
Winners are in bold text.

=== General ===
Record of the Year

Alejandro Sanz — "No Es Lo Mismo"

- Maria Rita — "A Festa"
- Robi Draco Rosa — "Más y Más"
- Skank — "Dois Rios"
- Bebo Valdés and Diego El Cigala — "Lágrimas Negras"
- Julieta Venegas — "Andar Conmigo"

Album of the Year

Alejandro Sanz — No Es Lo Mismo

- Café Tacuba — Cuatro Caminos
- Kevin Johansen — Sur O No Sur
- Maria Rita — Maria Rita
- Bebo Valdés and Diego El Cigala — Lágrimas Negras

Song of the Year

Alejandro Sanz — "No Es Lo Mismo"

- Coti Sorokin and Julieta Venegas — "Andar Conmigo" (Julieta Venegas)
- Emmanuel del Real — "Eres" (Café Tacuba)
- Kevin Johansen — "La Procesión"
- Luis Gómez-Escolar, Robi Draco Rosa and Itaal Shur — "Más y Más" (Robi Draco Rosa)

Best New Artist

Maria Rita

- Akwid
- Obie Bermúdez
- Mauricio & Palodeagua
- Superlitio

=== Pop ===
Best Female Pop Vocal Album

Rosario — De Mil Colores

- Rocío Dúrcal — Caramelito
- Ednita Nazario — Por Ti
- Paulina Rubio — Pau-Latina
- Jaci Velasquez — Milagro

Best Male Pop Vocal Album

Alejandro Sanz — No Es Lo Mismo

- Obie Bermúdez — Confesiones
- David Bisbal — Bulería
- Ricky Martin — Almas del Silencio
- Luis Miguel — 33

Best Pop Album by a Duo/Group with Vocals

Sin Bandera — De Viaje

- Area 305 — Hay Que Cambiar
- Estopa — ¿La calle es tuya?
- La Oreja de Van Gogh — Lo que te conté mientras te hacías la dormida
- Los Tri-O — Canciones del Alma de Marco Antonio Solís

=== Urban ===
Best Urban Music Album

Vico C — En Honor A La Verdad

- Akwid — Proyecto Akwid
- Control Machete — Uno, Dos: Bandera
- DJ Kane — DJ Kane
- Juan Gotti — No Sett Trippin

=== Rock ===
Best Rock Solo Vocal Album

Julieta Venegas — Sí

- Charly García — Rock & Roll Yo
- Alejandra Guzmán — Lipstick
- Fito Páez — Naturaleza Sangre
- Luis Alberto Spinetta — Para Los Árboles

Best Rock Album by a Duo/Group with Vocals

La Ley — Libertad

- Bersuit Vergarabat — La Argentinidad al Palo
- Café Quijano — ¡Qué grande es esto del amor!
- Divididos — Vivo Acá
- El Tri — Alex Lora: 35 Años y lo Que le Falta Todavía

Best Alternative Music Album

Café Tacuba — Cuatro Caminos

- Babasónicos — Infame
- Kinky — Atlas
- Ozomatli — Coming Up
- Plastilina Mosh — Hola Chicuelos

Best Rock Song

Emmanuel del Real — "Eres" (Café Tacuba)

- Ismael "Tito" Fuentes — "Here We Kum" (Molotov)
- Miguel "Mickey" Huidobro — "Hit Me" (Molotov)
- Desmond Child, Alejandra Guzmán and Jodi Marr — "Lipstick" (Alejandra Guzmán)
- Beto Cuevas — "Mi Ley" (La Ley)

=== Tropical ===
Best Salsa Album

Celia Cruz — Regalo del Alma

- Los Van Van — Van Van Live at Miami Arena
- Víctor Manuelle — Travesía
- Tito Nieves — Tito Nieves canta con el Conjunto Clásico: 25 Aniversario Recuerdos
- Jerry Rivera — Canto a Mi Ídolo... Frankie Ruiz

Best Merengue Album

Johnny Ventura — Sin Desperdicio

- Alex Bueno — 20 Años Después
- Gisselle — Contra la Marea
- Grupo Manía — Hombres de Honor
- Limi-T 21 — Como Nunca... Como Siempre

Best Contemporary Tropical Album

Albita — Albita Llegó

- Andy Andy — Necesito Un Amor
- Huey Dunbar — Music For My Peoples
- Frank Reyes — Cuando Se Quiere Se Puede
- Mickey Taveras — Sigo Siendo Romántico

Best Traditional Tropical Album

Bebo Valdés and Diego El Cigala — Lágrimas Negras

- Las Hermanas Márquez — Paquito D’Rivera Presents las Hermanas Márquez
- Manny Manuel — Serenata
- Danny Rivera and "El Topo" Antonio Cabán Vale — Amigos del Alma
- Tropicana All Stars — Tropicana All Stars Recuerda A Benny Moré

Best Tropical Song

Sergio George and Fernando Osorio — "Ríe y Llora" (Celia Cruz)

- Albita — "Albita Llegó"
- Raúl del Sol and Jorge Luis Piloto — "Creo en el Amor" (Rey Ruiz)
- Gian Marco — "Hoy" (Gloria Estefan)
- Emilio Estefan, Jr. and Víctor Manuelle — "Tengo Ganas (Salsa)" (Víctor Manuelle)

=== Singer-Songwriter ===
Best Singer-Songwriter Album

Soraya — Soraya

- Juan Gabriel — Inocente de Ti
- León Gieco — El Vivo de León
- Alejandro Lerner — Buen Viaje
- Joan Sebastian — Que Amarren A Cúpido
- Joan Manuel Serrat — Serrat Sinfónico

=== Regional Mexican ===
Best Ranchero Album

Vicente Fernández and Alejandro Fernández — En Vivo: Juntos Por Ultima Vez

- Pepe Aguilar — Con Orgullo Por Herencia
- Vicente Fernández — Se Me Hizo Tarde la Vida
- Pablo Montero — Gracias... Homenaje A Javier Solis
- Marco Antonio Solís — Tu Amor o Tu Desprecio

Best Banda Album

Banda El Recodo — Por Ti

- Cuisillos de Arturo Macias — Corazón
- El Coyote y su Banda Tierra Santa — El Rancho Grande
- Los Horóscopos de Durango — Puras de Rompe y Rasga
- Lupillo Rivera — Live! en Concierto — Universal Amphitheatre

Best Grupero Album

Alicia Villarreal — Cuando el Corazón Se Cruza

- Ana Bárbara — Te Atraparé... Bandido
- Bronco el Gigante de América — Siempre Arriba
- Ninel Conde — Ninel Conde
- Mariana — Seré Una Niña Buena

Best Tejano Album

Jimmy González & El Grupo Mazz — Live en el Valle

- La Tropa F — Un Nuevo Capítulo
- Little Joe & La Familia — Celebration Of Life - Volume Two Live
- Bobby Pulido — Móntame
- Sólido — Vuelve

Best Norteño Album

Los Tigres del Norte — Pacto de Sangre

- Ramón Ayala y Sus Bravos del Norte — Titere en Tus Manos/El Invicto
- Conjunto Primavera — Decide Tú
- Los Palominos — Canciones de la Rockola
- Michael Salgado — Entre Copas

Best Regional Mexican Song

Marco Antonio Solís — "Tu Amor o Tu Desprecio"

- Roberto Martínez — "¿A Donde Estabas?" (Intocable)
- Mario Quintero Lara — "Imperio" (Los Tucanes de Tijuana)
- José Cantoral — "José Pérez León" (Los Tigres del Norte)
- Freddie Martinez — "Titere en Tus Manos" (Ramón Ayala y Sus Bravos del Norte)

=== Instrumental ===
Best Instrumental Album

Yo-Yo Ma — Obrigado Brazil Live In Concert

- Armandinho — Retocando O Choro
- Paulo Moura — Estação Leopoldina
- Ricardo Silveira — Noite Clara
- Tanghetto — Emigrante (Electrotango)

=== Traditional ===
Best Folk Album

Kepa Junkera — K

- Manuel Alejandro — Manuel Alejandro y Punto: Homenaje Al Grupo Haciendo Punto en Otro Son
- Ecos de Borinquen — Jíbaro Hasta el Hueso: Mountain Music of Puerto Rico
- Horacio Guarany — Cantor de Cantores
- Perú Negro — Jolgorio
- Radio Tarifa — Fiebre

Best Tango Album

Gerardo Gandini — Postangos en Vivo en Rosario

- Pablo Mainetti — Tres Rincones
- María Estela Monti — Ciudadana
- Orquesta El Arranque — En Vivo en el Auditorio de la Rete Due de Suiza
- María Volonté and Horacio Larumbe — Fuimos

Best Flamenco Album

Paco de Lucía — Cositas Buenas

- Raimundo Amador — Isla Menor
- El Pele and Vicente Amigo — Canto
- Lebrijano — Yo Me Llamo Juan
- Enrique Morente — El Pequeño Reloj

=== Jazz ===
Best Latin Jazz Album

Chucho Valdés — New Conceptions

- Jerry Gonzalez y Los Piratas del Flamenco — Jerry Gonzalez y los Piratas del Flamenco
- Santos Neto Quinteto — Canto Do Rio Jovino
- Diego Urcola — Soundances
- Bebo Valdés and Federico Britos — We Could Make Such Beautiful Music Together

=== Christian ===
Best Christian Album (Spanish language)

Marcos Witt — Recordando Otra Vez

- Carlos Guzman — En las Alas de Una Paloma
- Samuel Hernández — Jesús Siempre Llega A Tiempo
- Rojo — 24/7
- Coalo Zamorano — Cosas Poderosas

Best Christian Album (Portuguese Language)

Aline Barros — Fruto de Amor

- Teus Igreja Batista and Nova Jerusalém — Discípulos
- Fernanda Lara y Giordani Vidal — Livre Para Amar
- Padre Marcelo Rossi — Maria Mãe Do Filho de Deus (Trilha Sonora Original do Filme)
- Gospel Thales — Acústico

=== Brazilian ===
Best Brazilian Contemporary Pop Album

Carlinhos Brown — Carlinhos Brown Es Carlito Marrón

- Roberto Carlos — Pra Sempre
- Jota Quest — MTV Ao Vivo
- Rita Lee — Balacobaco
- Daniela Mercury — Carnaval Eletrônico
- O Rappa — O Silêncio Q Precede o Esporro
- Ivete Sangalo — Clube Carnavalesco Inocentes em Progresso

Best Brazilian Rock Album

Skank — Cosmotron

- Roberto Frejat — Sobre Nós 2 e O Resto do Mundo
- Los Hermanos — Ventura
- Os Paralamas do Sucesso — Uns Dias Ao Vivo
- Pitty — Admirável Chip Novo

Best Samba/Pagode Album

Nana, Dori and Danilo — Para Caymmi. de Nana, Dori e Danilo

- Jorge Aragão — Da Noite Pro Dia
- Monarco — Uma Historia do Samba
- Zeca Pagodinho — Acústico MTV
- Velha Guarda Do Salgueiro — Velha Guarda do Salgueiro

Best MPB Album

Maria Rita — Maria Rita

- Maria Bethânia — Brasileirinho
- Gal Costa — Todas as Coisas e Eu
- Guinga — Noturno Copacabana
- Cesar Camargo Mariano and Pedro Mariano — Piano y Voz

Best Romantic Music Album

Zezé di Camargo & Luciano — Zezé di Camargo y Luciano

- Ataíde & Alexandre — Momento Especial
- Bruno & Marrone — Inevitável
- Juliano Cezar — O Cowboy Vagabundo-Vida de Peão
- Leonardo — Brincadeira Tem Hora
- Marciano — Ao Vivo-Meu Ofício é Cantar

Best Brazilian Roots/Regional Album

Banda de Pífanos de Caruaru — No Século XXI, no Pátio do Forró

- Ara Ketu — Obrigado a Você
- Cascabulho — É Caco de Vidro Puro
- Maria Dapaz — Luiz Gonzaga na Voz de Maria Dapaz-Vida de Viajante
- Liu & Léu — Jeitão de Caboclo
- Sérgio Reis and Filhos — Violas e Violeiros

Best Brazilian Song

Milton Nascimento — "A Festa" (Maria Rita)

- Joyce — "A Banda" (Joyce and Banda Maluca)
- Roberto de Carvalho, Arnaldo Jabor and Rita Lee — "Amor e Sexo" (Rita Lee)
- Lô Borges, Nando Reis and Samuel Rosa — "Dois Rios" (Skank)
- Roberto Carlos — "Pra Sempre"
- Lucas, Fernando Mendes and José Wilson — "Você Não Me Ensinou a Te Esquecer" (Caetano Veloso)

=== Children's ===
Best Latin Children's Album

Niños Adorando — Niños Adorando 2

- Alegrijes y Rebujos — Disco
- Tatiana — El Regalo
- Various Artists — Canciones Con Acción Para Niños
- Xuxa — Só Para Baixinhos 4

=== Classical ===
Best Classical Album

Various Artists — Jobim Sinfônico
Orquestra Simfònica de Barcelona I Nacional de Catalunya — Carmen Symphony

- Uakti — Clássicos
- Various Artists — Eugenio Toussaint Música de Cámara
- Trío Argentino — Schubert - Fauré
- Joao Carlos Assis Brasil — Villa-Lobos Bachianas Brasileiras Nº 4 e Cirandas João

=== Production ===
Best Engineered Album

Rafa Sardina — No Es Lo Mismo (Alejandro Sanz)

- Moogie Canazio and Gabriel Pinheiro — Brasileirinho (Maria Bethânia)
- Pepe Loeches — Lágrimas Negras (Bebo Valdés and Diego El Cigala)
- Álvaro Alencar and Tom Capone — Maria Rita (Maria Rita)
- Eric Schilling, Al Schmit and Armin Steiner — Trumpet Evolution (Arturo Sandoval)

Producer of the Year

Javier Limón

- Claudia Brant, Chuy Flores, Jeeve and Gen Rubin
- Tom Capone
- Sebastian Krys
- Gustavo Santaolalla

=== Music video ===
Best Music Video

Robi Draco Rosa — "Más y Más"

- Café Tacuba — "Eres"
- Kevin Johansen — "La Procesión"
- Molotov — "Hit Me"
- Roselyn Sánchez — "Amor Amor"

=== Special awards ===
Lifetime Achievement Awards

- Mercedes Sosa
- José José
- Roberto Carlos
- Willie Colón
- Antonio Aguilar

Trustees Award

- Manuel Esperón
