= Jei Beibi =

Studio album by Café Tacuba
- Released: May 5, 2017
- Recorded: 2016–2017
- Studio: Los Angeles
- Length: 52:51
- Label: Melotrón
- Producer: Gustavo Santaolalla; Café Tacuba

Café Tacuba chronology
El Objeto Antes Llamado Disco (2012)	Jei Beibi (2017)	Un Segundo MTV Unplugged (2019)

Jei Beibi (phonetic pronunciation of "Hey Baby" in Spanish) is the eighth studio album by Mexican band, Café Tacuba, released on May 5, 2017. It is their first album in five years. Having fulfilled their recording contract with Universal Music México, they decided to record future projects independently. A single, "Un Par de Lugares" was recorded during the Jei Beibi sessions but was left off the final album. Three singles were eventually released from the album: "Futuro", "Que No", and "Disolviéndonos". The band embarked on the Niu Güéis (New Ways) Tour to promote the album. The album won the Latin Grammy Award for Best Alternative Music Album in 2018. This is the first album in which lead singer Rubén Albarrán does not use a pseudonym.

Professional ratings
Review scores
Source	Rating
AllMusic	5/5 stars

== Track listing ==
All tracks written by Café Tacuba, except where noted.

No.	Title	Writer(s)	Length
1.	"1-2-3"		3:18
2.	"Matando" ("Killing")		4:42
3.	"Automático" (Automatic)		1:32
4.	"Enamorada" ("In Love")	Emmanuel del Real	2:52
5.	"Futuro" ("Future")	Quique Rangel	3:09
6.	"Resolana de Luna" ("Moonglow")		1:55
7.	"El Mundo en que Nací" ("The World I Was Born in")		5:09
8.	"Me Gusta Tu Manera" ("I Like Your Way")		4:04
9.	"Vaivén" ("Sway")		4:52
10.	"Que No"	Quique Rangel	5:25
11.	"Diente de León" ("Dandelion")		5:57
12.	"Disolviéndonos" ("Dissolving Ourselves")		6:08
13.	"Celebración" ("Celebration")		2:53

== Personnel ==
- Rubén Albarrán – vocals, guitars
- Emmanuel del Real – keyboards, programming, percussion, vocals
- Joselo Rangel – guitar, vocals
- Quique Rangel – bass

== Charts ==
Chart (2017)	Peak position
US Latin Pop Albums (Billboard)	13
US Top Latin Albums (Billboard)	48
