= El Objeto Antes Llamado Disco =

El Objeto Antes Llamado Disco (The Object Formerly Known as Record)

Studio album by Café Tacuba
- Released: October 22, 2012 (Mexico, Latin America, and the U.S.)
- Recorded: México, Argentina, Chile, etc
- Genre: Latin alternative, Latin rock, folk rock
- Length: 38:59
- Label: Universal Music Mexico
- Producer: Gustavo Santaolalla Café Tacvba & Tony Peluso

Café Tacuba chronology
Sino (2007)	El Objeto Antes Llamado Disco (The Object Formerly Known as Record) (2012)	Jei Beibi (2017)

El Objeto Antes Llamado Disco is the seventh studio album released by Mexican band, Café Tacuba, on October 22, 2012. In this album, the band has once again collaborated with award-winning Argentine music producer Gustavo Santaolalla.

The album's first single release was "De Este Lado del Camino" (From This Side of the Path)

== Track listing ==
No.	Title	Writer(s)	Length
1.	"Pájaros" ("Birds")	Emmanuel del Real	2:21
2.	"Andamios" ("Scaffolds")	Joselo Rangel	4:01
3.	"De Este Lado del Camino" ("From This Side of the Path")	Rubén Albarrán, Emmanuel del Real	4:38
4.	"Espuma" ("Foam")	Emmanuel del Real	3:45
5.	"Olita del Altamar" ("Little Wave of the High Seas")	Emmanuel del Real	3:42
6.	"Aprovéchate" ("Take Advantage")	Joselo Rangel	4:14
7.	"Zopilotes" ("Black Vultures")	Joselo Rangel	4:33
8.	"Yo Busco" ("I'm Looking For")	Joselo Rangel	4:01
9.	"Tan Mal" ("So Bad")	Enrique Rangel	2:51
10.	"Volcán" ("Volcano")	Rubén Albarrán, Emmanuel del Real	4:48

== Personnel ==
- Zopilotes de Alas Blancas y Cabeza Negra (Rubén Albarrán) - vocals, guitars
- Emmanuel del Real - keyboards, programming, percussion, vocals
- Joselo Rangel - guitar, vocals
- Quique Rangel - bass, ukulele

== Charts ==
Chart (2012)	Peak position
Mexican Albums (AMPROFON)	1
US Top Latin Albums (Billboard)	7
US Latin Pop Albums (Billboard)	3

== Certifications ==
Region	Certification	Certified units/sales
Mexico (AMPROFON)	Gold	30,000^{^}
^{^} Shipments figures based on certification alone.
