= Re (Café Tacuba album) =

Studio album by Café Tacuba
- Released: July 22, 1994
- Recorded: 1992–1993; CAN-AM Studios, Devonshire Studios (Los Ángeles, Estados Unidos)
- Studios: Cuernavaca, Mexico; Can-Am (Los Angeles, California); Devonshire (Los Angeles, California)
- Genres: Latin alternative; rock en español; norteño
- Length: 59:36
- Label: Warner Music Mexico
- Producer: Gustavo Santaolalla

Café Tacuba chronology
Café Tacuba (1992)	Re (1994)	Avalancha de Éxitos (1996)

Professional ratings
Review scores
Source	Rating
Amazon	Amazon Enlace
All Music Guide	Enlace
CD Universe	Enlace
iTunes	Enlace
89decibeles	Enlace
Discogs	Enlace

Re is the second studio album by the Alternative rock band Café Tacvba, released on July 22, 1994 by Warner Music Group. It was recorded in Los Angeles, California and Cuernavaca, Morelos under the production of Gustavo Santaolalla. It is widely considered their best studio material, and some critics have described it as the best Spanish-language album in history. For this album, Café Tacvba collaborated with other artists such as Luis Conte and Alejandro Flores. Rubén Albarrán, the group's vocalist, is credited on this album as "Cosme."

On this album, the band experiments with various musical genres, from regional Mexican music, such as trio, huapango, norteño and banda, to others as diverse as punk, funk, grunge, mambo, Brazilian samba and Jamaican ska. It was widely acclaimed by critics as a masterpiece, and has even been described as the Spanish-language equivalent of the White Album due to its brilliant craftsmanship and stylistic diversity. With this, they achieved international acclaim and sold almost half a million copies of this material. Rolling Stone Magazine named it the best Latin American album in the history of rock.

== History ==
Following the positive reception of their 1992 self-titled debut album, Tacvba began to shape their second album. The band had toured the country, and on those trips, they gained a closer look at Mexico's multiculturalism as a whole, and how all these codes could coexist within a single society. This fascination with rock, tradition, aesthetics, syncretism, and the amalgamation of the pre-Hispanic and the postmodern led them to go a step further and compose songs that portray them as young people immersed in a diverse country, with the different visions and music they had heard up until that point. Added to this was the intention, for the first time, to create premeditated songs for a studio album, rather than songs that would be released in live performances, as was the case with the repertoire of their previous album.

The album's title is completely literal and conceptual, the prefix "re-" being a reflection on the cycle of human life, and the idea that musical fusion is a circular journey that returns to its starting point. What's more, on a rare and limited edition of the album (only released in Mexico), the words "Repetition," "Reiteration," "Recycling," and "Resistance" appear in its artwork; in addition to a kind of spiral-shaped calligram with the legend "Everything that was will be again and everything that is will cease to be – Nahuatl proverb," and even a quote from Mexican anthropologist Guillermo Bonfil Batalla that speaks precisely to the cyclical notion of time. It also relates to the band's professional work, as a second studio album meant a cycle of restart for them.

Despite demonstrating laudable artistic growth, the album was not initially well-received when it was released in mid-1994. Critics and the Mexican public alike vilified the album, considering it strange, incomprehensible, and not as entertaining as the first album. However, some songs from Re would eventually gain popularity in South American countries, particularly in Chile, where the band played several times a year. As a result, its popularity grew and spread to the rest of Latin America (largely due to the "MTV Generation" of the 1990s), sparking the interest of the North American specialized press and artists such as Talking Heads singer David Byrne.

Re ended up becoming a resounding success, achieving gold record in Mexico for more than 40,000 copies sold, and established the band as a major force in Spanish rock. This production produced the single "La Ingrata," whose video was awarded "Video de la Gente" at the 1995 MTV Video Music Awards on the Latin American channel. Other important songs that have become classics for the band were also released: "El Ciclón," "Esa noche," "Las Flores," "El Metro," "El baile y el salón," and "El puñal y el corazón."

At the end of 2014, Cafe Tacvba went on the "#20reCT25" tour, which celebrated the album's twentieth anniversary and the band's silver anniversary, touring Mexico, the United States, and South American countries. On each of these dates, the quartet played the entire album, including all twenty songs.

== Legacy ==
Re album established Café Tacuba's style of genre-switching, which had not been as prominent on their debut album Café Tacuba, released two years earlier. Its sheer length – an hour long – and experimentation with musical styles have made it a favorite among fans. One notable aspect of the album is that it contains several musical genres, notably norteño, huapango, banda, and bolero.

Colombian rock band Aterciopelados performed a song entitled "Re" as an homage to the band and the album on their 2016 live album Reluciente, Rechinante y Aterciopelado.

Re has sold more than 125,000 units in Mexico, 15,000 in Chile and 50,000 in the United States.

To date, it has received accolades from major media outlets like The New York Times, BBC Music, Rolling Stone, and AllMusic, and was ranked No. 3 on the "Los 600 de Latinoamérica" list compiled by a collective of music journalists earlier this decade, highlighting the top 600 Latin American albums from 1920-2022.

== Album ==
Argentinian producer Gustavo Santaolalla, who had worked on the band's previous album, collaborated again on this production. The songs that make up Re feature a wide range of instrumentation and incorporate diverse musical styles, often even in a single song, while maintaining the album's consistent tone. Its theme revolves around the recognition of Mexico's cultural diversity through the cyclical nature of sound.

The album's eclectic approach is revealed in the opening track, "El aparato", which uses a combination of Indigenous Mexican and electronic instrumentation to tell a paranormal story involving a character named Pablo.

"La ingrata", a parody of norteño music in a kind of polka-ska style, was the album's biggest hit single. In 2017, the group declared that they would not play it again to avoid influencing the attitudes of listeners with a song about shooting a woman.

This is followed by "El ciclón", which was also a single, a funk song played on clavinet that evokes the music of Billy Preston, with lyrics that perhaps best illustrate and sum up the concept of Re. "El borrego" is a bizarre industrial punk-metal track, somewhat reminiscent of Ministry, with first-person lyrics that ironically address the superficial nature of identity and the ambiguity of ideology (although they also mention and pay tribute to other bands on the Mexican rock scene, such as La Lupita and Maldita Vecindad). Next up is one of the album's highlights, "Esa noche", an exquisite track with a bolero sound that is the album art indicates is dedicated to Chavela Vargas.

"24 Horas" tells the story that is joyous but marked by the hustle and bustle of the modern life, and thus serves as a kind of allegory of the big city. Magical realism makes its presence felt in "Ixtepec" (a song inspired by the novel Los recuerdos del porvenir by Elena Garro), whose ending aligns with the album's concept of life as a cycle.

"Trópico de Cáncer" is the album's most political song, with lyrics in the form of a dialogue criticizing so-called "progress" and the oil industry, and a rhythm that oscillates between bossa nova and industrial noise. It is followed by the cloistered love story of "El metro," a groovie song that also received heavy radio airplay, which references different stations of the Mexico City metro in another allegory of big-city life.

"El Fin de la Infancia" uses metal wind instruments in the style of a Sinaloa band, mixing quebradita with ska-punk energy; its title, which translates as "Childhood's End", is inspired by the book of the same name by Arthur C. Clarke. Its Mexican rhythm is chosen deliberately to match lyrics that reflect the ideals of Tacvba in those years, openly questioning Mexico's malinchism and calling on young people to defend themselves against cultural standards imposed by the so-called First World. It also proposes that dancing is more than a recreational activity, describing it as a form of self-determination in a quest to establish a uniquely Mexican cultural movement. It is followed by "Madrugal", a short bolero number whose lyrics take inspiration from the Mexican humourist writer Jorge Ibargüengoitia.

"Pez" is a short song describing the harrowing experience of a fish suffocating after being caught. This track leads directly into the industrial flavored "Verde", which in turn is followed by "La negrita", a fable set to a samba beat. Next is "El Tlatoani del barrio", a song with a mestizo sound that recounts the story of how lead singer Rubén Albarrán's parents met.

The final tracks on the album continue its eclectic style: the radio-friendly "Las flores" (another of the album's hit singles), the grunge-tinged "La pinta", the disco-flavoured "El baile y el salón", a love song in a mambo/bossa nova style ("El puñal y el corazón"), and finally a short 1940s-style romantic ballad in the tradition of Agustín Lara, "El balcón".

== Track listing ==
No.	Title	Writer(s)	Length
1.	"El Aparato" ("The Contraption")	Rubén Albarrán	3:19
2.	"La Ingrata" ("The Ungrateful Woman")	Emmanuel del Real	3:32
3.	"El Ciclón" ("The Cyclone")	Del Real; Albarrán	2:55
4.	"El Borrego" ("The Sheep")	Del Real	2:08
5.	"Esa Noche" ("That Night")	Joselo Rangel; Enrique Rangel	3:27
6.	"24 Horas" ("24 Hours")	J. Rangel	2:19
7.	"Ixtepec" ("Ixtepec")	J. Rangel; Del Real	3:21
8.	"Trópico de Cáncer" ("Tropic of Cancer")	Albarrán	4:38
9.	"El Metro" ("The Subway")	Del Real	3:46
10.	"El Fin de la Infancia" ("Childhood's End")	J. Rangel	2:19
11.	"Madrugal" ("Song for Dawn")	E. Rangel	1:08
12.	"Pez" ("Fish")	J. Rangel; Del Real	2:18
13.	"Verde" ("Green")	Albarrán	1:55
14.	"La Negrita" ("The Little Black Woman")	J. Rangel; E. Rangel	3:05
15.	"El Tlatoani del Barrio" ("The King of the Neighborhood")	Albarrán	3:27
16.	"Las Flores" ("The Flowers")	Del Real	2:16
17.	"La Pinta" ("Hooky/Skive")	Albarrán	2:49
18.	"El Baile y el Salón" ("The Dance and the Ballroom")	J. Rangel; Del Real	5:08
19.	"El Puñal y el Corazón" ("The Dagger and the Heart")	Albarrán	4:22
20.	"El Balcón" ("The Balcony")	Albarrán	1:41

== Personnel ==
=== Band members ===
- Cosme (Rubén Albarrán) – lead vocals
- Emmanuel del Real – keyboards, acoustic guitar, piano, programming, drum machine, backing vocals, lead vocals, melodeon
- Joselo Rangel – electric guitar, acoustic guitar, jarana, backing vocals
- Quique Rangel – bass guitar, electric upright bass, guitarron, backing vocals

=== Art ===
- Sergio Toporek
- Rubén Albarrán
