= Sino (Café Tacuba album) =

Studio album by Café Tacuba
- Released: October 9, 2007
- Studio: Sunset Sound, Hollywood, California; Additional recordings in El Ensayo, Satélite, México
- Genre: Latin alternative, latin rock
- Length: 57:35
- Label: Universal Music Mexico
- Producer: Gustavo Santaolalla Café Tacvba & Tony Peluso

Café Tacuba chronology
Cuatro Caminos (2003)	Sino (2007)	El Objeto Antes Llamado Disco (2012)

Sino is the Latin Grammy winning sixth studio album by Mexican band Café Tacuba, released on October 9, 2007 in Mexico, Latin America and the United States. The band has once again worked with award-winning Argentine music producer Gustavo Santaolalla.

Four singles spawned off the album- "Volver a Comenzar", "Esta Vez", "Vámonos", and "Quiero Ver".

The full album leaked onto the internet on October 6, 2007.

On September 10, 2008, Café Tacvba became the leading nominee at the Latin Grammy Awards of 2008 with a total of six nominations: Album of the Year and Alternative Music Album, for Sino. The lead single "Volver a Comenzar" was shortlisted for Record of the Year and Best Alternative Song. The second single "Esta Vez" received nominations for Best Rock Song and Song of the Year. The band took the record for most Latin Grammys won in one night.

"Volver a Comenzar" is featured prominently in the video game LittleBigPlanet, as well as in the Netflix fantasy film Chupa.

== Reception ==
Professional ratings
Review scores
Source	Rating
Allmusic	4/5 stars

CAFÉ TACUBA The greatest rock band in Mexico and -- to some ears -- possibly even the world returns with "Sino," its first studio record in four years... "Café Tacuba, has been Mexico's pre-eminent rock band for [over a] decade, and it keeps getting better and more ambitious... Café Tacuba dares to treat rock as art... better than almost all other rock these days... one of the most important bands in the hemisphere. a smart, cosmopolitan band with a broad streak of lighthearted surrealism.

— The New York Times

The group remains the marquee name in Spanish-language rock... Nobody has come along to seriously challenge the stature and influence of Café Tacuba.

— Los Angeles Times

In Mexico, the album was certified Gold by Asociación Mexicana de Productores de Fonogramas y Videogramas (AMPROFON) for selling 30,000 units. In addition, a pre-loaded bundle of audio and video tracks including "Volver a Comenzar", "Esta Vez", "Y Es Que...", "Vámonos" and "Quiero Ver" was certified Gold for selling an additional 50,000 units.

== Track listing ==
No.	Title	Length
1.	"Seguir Siendo" ("Keep Being")	2:42
2.	"Tengo Todo" ("I Have Everything")	3:06
3.	"53100" (postal code for Ciudad Satélite (Naucalpan de Juárez, State of Mexico))	3:43
4.	"El Outsider" ("The Outsider")	4:12
5.	"Volver a Comenzar" ("Begin Again")	7:43
6.	"Arrullo" ("Lullaby")	4:15
7.	"Vámonos" ("Let's Go")	4:02
8.	"Cierto o Falso" ("True or False")	3:24
9.	"Esta Vez" ("This Time")	4:22
10.	"De Acuerdo" ("Agreed")	2:20
11.	"Abandonado" ("Abandoned")	2:44
12.	"Y Es Que..." ("It's Just That...")	2:31
13.	"Quiero Ver" ("I Want to See")	3:25
14.	"Agua" ("Water")	3:12
15.	"Gracias" ("Thank You")	5:54

== Personnel ==
- Ixaya Mazatzin Tleyotl aka. Ixxi Xoo/ Cone Cahuitl (Rubén Albarrán) – vocals (lead vocals on all tracks except 2, 3, 7 and 12; co-lead vocals on 13 and 14), guitar
- Emmanuel Del Real – Keyboards, acoustic guitar, piano, programming, vocals (lead vocals on track 3 and 7; co-lead vocals on 13 and 14), melodeon
- Joselo Rangel – Electric guitar, acoustic guitar, vocals (lead vocals on track 2).
- Quique Rangel – Bass guitar, electric upright bass, vocals (lead vocals on track 12).

Additional Musicians:

- Victor Indrizzo - Acoustic and Mic’d Drums

== Charts ==
Chart (2007)	Peak position
US Top Latin Albums (Billboard)	20
US Latin Pop Albums (Billboard)	7

== Certifications ==
Region	Certification	Certified units/sales
Mexico (AMPROFON)	Gold	50,000^{^}
^{^} Shipments figures based on certification alone.
