= Revés/Yo Soy =

Studio album by Café Tacuba
- Released: 20 July 1999
- Recorded: 1998–1999
- Genres: Experimental rock, post-rock, electronic music, art pop, art rock, concrete music, ambient, folk, chamber music, math rock
- Length: 98:15
- Label: Warner Music Mexico
- Producers: Gustavo Santaolalla, Emmanuel del Real

Café Tacuba chronology
Avalancha de Éxitos (1996)	Revés/Yo Soy (1999)	Tiempo Transcurrido (2001)

Singles from Revés/Yo Soy
- 1. "Revés" Released: 1999; 2. "La Locomotora" Released: 1999; 3. "Dos Niños" Released: 1999; 4. "La Muerte Chiquita" Released: 1999; 5. "El Ave" Released: 1999

Professional ratings
Review scores
Source	Rating
AllMusic	4/5 stars
Alternative Press	4/5
The Encyclopedia of Popular Music	4/5 stars
(The New) The Rolling Stone Album Guide	4/5 stars
Spin	9/10

Revés/Yo Soy (English: Backwards/I Am) is the fourth studio album by the alternative rock band Café Tacvba, released on July 20, 1999, by Warner Music Group. It consists of two albums: Revés, an album featuring instrumental works by the band; and Yo soy, a collection of songs sung by Rubén Albarrán and Emmanuel del Real.

The album has not been released on digital platforms due to administrative issues related to the record label at the time. The band had the mastering rights to Revés, however they did not obtain the rights to Yo Soy, which complicated its release on digital platforms. Some songs can be heard in digital format on their compilation album, Tiempo transcurrido (2001), the songs are, "13/Revés", "La Locomotora", "Dos Niños", "La Muerte Chiquita" and "2".

== Critical reception ==
The New York Times wrote: "Many of the Spanish lyrics are about isolation and disorientation: as most great bands do three or four albums into a career, Cafe Tacuba has made a record about entering one's 30s and wondering what the next step is."

In a retrospective article, the Chicago Tribune called the album a "masterpiece," writing that it "matched offbeat Eno-meets-Esquivel instrumentals with slightly more conventional rock songs."

== Information ==
Originally, the band members proposed only the album Revés to their then-label, Warner Music Group, in 1998, but Warner Music decided they would have to release something with vocals because (they argued) that was what identified them. This is why the group decided to release Yo soy alongside Revés.

The fact that there were two albums led Rubén Albarrán to choose different names for each one. In the credits for Revés, he appears as "Nrü" (which supposedly comes from the abbreviation of the phrase "Núcleo Radio Üno"), while on Yo Soy, the lead singer is "Amparo Tonto Medardo In La Kech," a name they continued to use until December 2000, when they changed their name to "G-3."

It was released in 1999 and won the Latin Grammy the following year for Best Rock Album. This was the first year the Latin Grammys were held.

The album was characterized by its surreal lyrics and its influences from electronic music, contemporary classical music, and experimental music grounded in rock and Mexican folklore. The experimental nature of the album and the lack of a marketable single led to low sales success, so the record label decided to withdraw it from the market. For this same reason, the company also decided to terminate the group's contract.

== Track listing ==
Disc 1: Revés
No.	Title	Length
1.	"11"	4:15
2.	"2"	5:32
3.	"9"	5:02
4.	"5"	3:49
5.	"3"	4:43
6.	"8"	4:11
7.	"10" (This is the recording of the "Compañía Nacional de Danza Fólclorica del Instituto Nacional de Bellas Artes", Emmanuel del Real distorted and programmed the song)	3:47
8.	"5.1" (Performed by "Cuarteto de Clarinetes Arghül")	2:32
9.	"13" (The only track with lyrics; this song became a single later, known as "Revés" due to the use of the word in the chorus)	5:40
10.	"M.C." (Performed by Kronos Quartet. This song is a cover of "La Muerte Chiquita)	4:05
11.	"6"	3:59
12.	"7"	2:48
13.	"..."	0:13

Disc 2: Yo Soy
No.	Title	Length
1.	"El Padre (The Father)"	3:27
2.	"La Locomotora (The Locomotive)"	3:53
3.	"El Río (The River)"	2:57
4.	"El Polen (The Pollen)"	3:28
5.	"Dos Niños (Two Kids)"	3:30
6.	"La Muerte Chiquita (The Little Death)"	2:52
7.	"El Espacio (The Space)"	4:23
8.	"Guerra (War)" (This song has no numbers or letters as a name, instead, there's a drawing)	4:08
9.	Untitled (This song has no title in the liner notes. Its exact name is: " ")	2:11
10.	"El Hombre Impasible (The Unfeeling Man)"	2:11
11.	"El Ave (The Bird)" (Like "Guerra", this track has a drawing for its title)	3:20
12.	"Esperando (Waiting)" (The lyrics of the song are the route to Enrique Rangel's apartment)	0:40
13.	"Árboles Frutales (Fruit Trees)" (On the CD, this song is composed of 13 tracks (Tracks 13–25); 12 seventeen-second tracks and one twenty-four-second track)	3:53
14.	"Bicicleta (Bicycle)" (As with "Árboles Frutales" this song is composed of 26 six-second tracks (Tracks 26–51))	2:51
15.	"Lento (Slow)"	4:03

== Personnel ==
- Ñru/Amparo Tonto Medardo In Lak' ech (Rubén Albarrán) – vocals (except 4, 7, 12, 15), guitar
- Emmanuel del Real – keyboards, acoustic guitar, piano, programming, vocals (4, 7), melodica, drum machine
- Joselo Rangel – electric guitar, acoustic guitar, vocals (15)
- Quique Rangel – bass guitar, electric upright bass, vocals (12)

== Charts ==
Chart (1999)	Peak position
US Top Latin Albums (Billboard)	48
