= Café Tacuba =

Mexican rock band

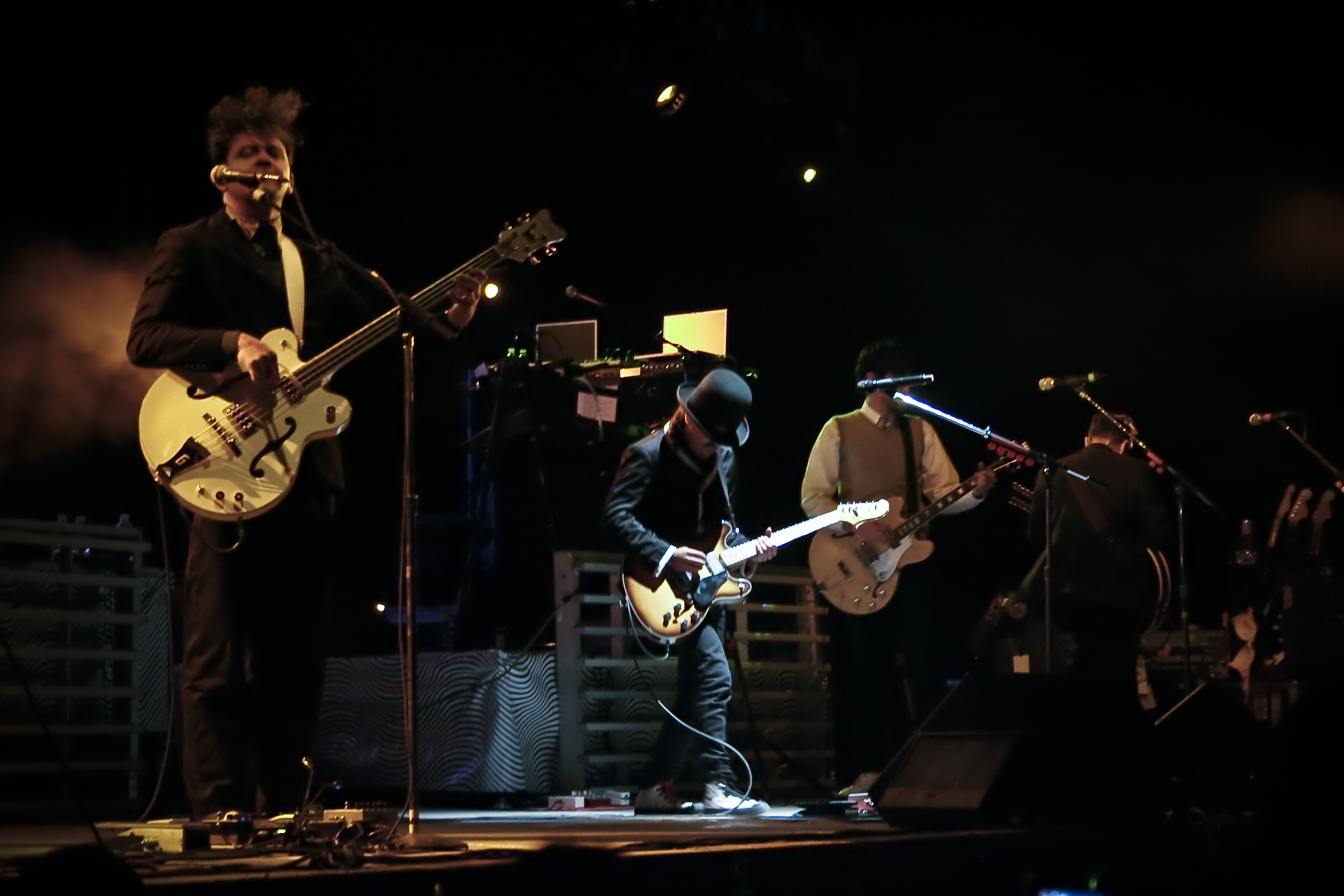
- Café Tacuba performing on October 12, 2008 in Buenos Aires, Argentina.

Background information
- Origin: Naucalpan, State of Mexico, Mexico
- Genres: Alternative rock; Latin alternative; Latin rock; Latin hip-hop
- Years active: 1989–present
- Labels: Warner Mexico (1992–1999); Universal Mexico (2003–present)
- Members: Rubén Albarrán; Emmanuel del Real; Enrique Rangel; Joselo Rangel

Café Tacuba (Spanish pronunciation: [kaˈfe taˈkuβa]) (stylized as Café Tacvba) is a Mexican rock band formed in 1989 in Naucalpan de Juárez, State of Mexico. The group gained popularity in the early 1990s. They were founded in 1989, before they had the current lineup of Rubén Isaac Albarrán Ortega (lead vocals, rhythm guitar), Emmanuel del Real Díaz (keyboards, piano, programming, rhythm guitar, melodica, vocals), José Alfredo "Joselo" Rangel Arroyo (lead guitar, vocals), and Enrique "Quique" Rangel Arroyo (bass guitar, electric upright bass, vocals), their friend Roberto Silva played the keyboards for a short period of time. Since the Cuatro Caminos World Tour, Luis "El Children" Ledezma has played the drums in every concert but is not considered an official member of the band, as well as Ramiro Del Real Díaz, who joined the band as a support musician playing the guitar since 2015.

== History ==
=== Formation (1987–90) ===
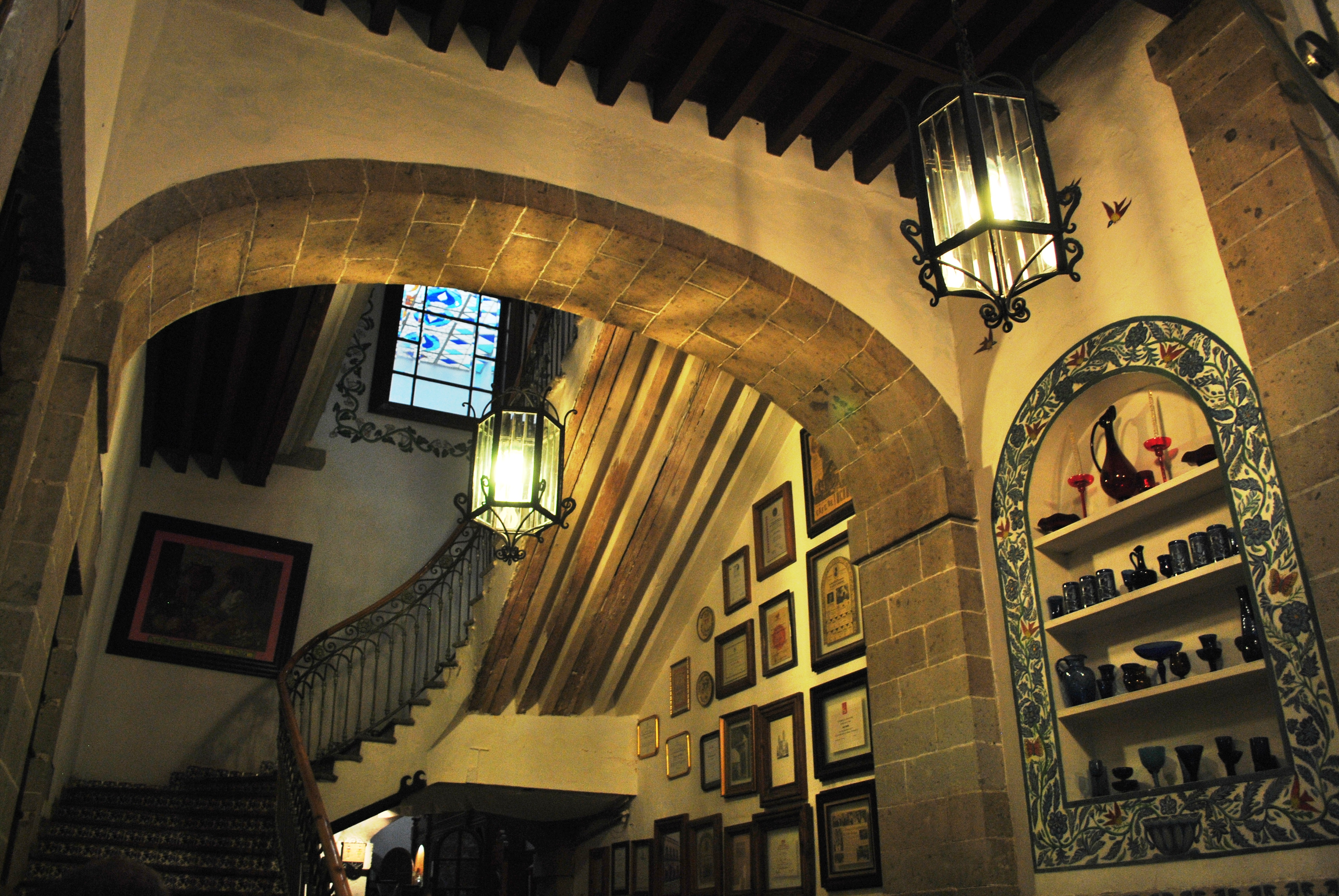
el Café de Tacuba

Previously known as "Alicia ya no vive aquí" (a tribute to Martin Scorsese's Alice Doesn't Live Here Anymore), the band took its final name from a historic restaurant (el Café de Tacuba) located in downtown Mexico City. The café, which opened in 1912 and had its heyday in the 1940s and 1950s, was representative of the Pachuco scene at the time, something the band would later acknowledge as an influence. The Café de Tacuba is still in operation as a coffee shop and restaurant on Tacuba Street, in Mexico City's Historic Center. The band changed its name to Café Tacvba (changing the u for a v) to avoid legal issues with the coffee shop.

Singer Rubén Albarran and guitarist José Alfredo Rangel met while studying graphic design at Metropolitan Autonomous University in Mexico City. Rangel's brother, Enrique, completed the band's lineup in 1989. The group began playing music in the garage of a house in their neighborhood, Satélite, an upper-middle-class suburban area in the Naucalpan municipality, of the State of Mexico. Café Tacvba was principally influenced by alternative rock bands of the 1980s such as The Cure, The Clash, The Smiths, and Violent Femmes. Despite their English-language influences, the band members wanted to represent their native culture, so they incorporated Mexican influences into their music. The group began singing primarily in Spanish and changed their name to Café Tacvba.

Café Tacvba went from being a garage band to a concert act in 1989, when they joined the scene surrounding El Hijo del Cuervo, a cultural club in Coyoacán featuring writers and musicians. As they performed in various venues around Mexico City, they were discovered by Argentinian music producer Gustavo Santaolalla, who at the time was producing albums for leading bands of the burgeoning Rock en Español movement of the time. Santaolalla arranged a contract for the band with Warner Music Latina (WEA), with plans to produce its debut album himself. Café Tacvba in turn proceeded to record their first song for commercial release, "Tamales de Iguanita", which WEA released as part of a Christmas-themed rock en español compilation, Diciembre 25, in 1990.

=== Early success (1991–96) ===
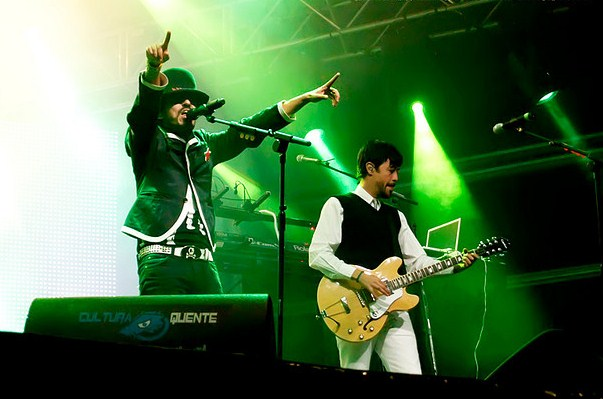
Café Tacvba performing in Pontevedra, Spain.

The group's debut album, Café Tacvba, was released in 1992 and was extremely popular in Mexico. The group experimented with many different musical styles, from punk and ska, to electronica and hip hop, to regional Mexican varieties such norteño, bolero, and ranchera. However, the band was taken aback by the stark difference between the sound on the album and group's "rawer" live sound, likening the recording to "a pasteurized version of ourselves". Café Tacvba released five singles from the album – "Maria", "Rarotonga", "Las Persianas", "La Chica Banda" and "Las Batallas" – with a music video filmed for each, with the exception of the latter. "María", directed by Gustavo Garzón, was nominated for Video of the Year at the Lo Nuestro Awards of 1993.

Two years later the band released a follow-up album, Re, in 1994. The singles "La Ingrata" (which had a music video directed by Fernando De Garay), "Las Flores" (which had a music video directed by Carlos Somonte) and "El Ciclón" were also commercially successful. On the album, collaborators included Luis Conte and Alejandra Flores, while unconventional rock instrumentation such as jarana, guitarrón, melodeon, and drum machines were employed. The album's mixture of genres such as alternative rock, punk, and metal with traditional Latin American styles helped the group develop a dedicated cult following. During the promotion of the album, the band's attendance at the 1995 New Music Seminar in New York helped garner some media attention in the United States.

In 1996 Café Tacvba released Avalancha de Éxitos, meaning "Avalanche of Hits", a covers album in which the band performed songs by other Spanish-speaking artists. The tracks were recorded while the band was in the studio working on Re and grew tired of recording new material. Avalancha de Éxitos marked Café Tacvba's first appearance on Billboard's album charts (number 12 on the Latin Pop chart, 28 on Top Latin Albums), and the band commenced an international tour to promote the album. In 1996, the band also contributed to the AIDS benefit album Silencio=Muerte: Red Hot + Latin produced by the Red Hot Organization performing along with David Byrne. The music video for the single "Como Te Extraño" was nominated for a Lo Nuestro Award.

=== Revés/Yo Soy (1997–99) ===
In the wake of the group's international tour, Café Tacvba withdrew from music for a while. When they returned to work, they gathered in their own studio and spent roughly a half-year working on experimental music that encompassed ambient electronica and musique concrète, as well as collaborative work with the Kronos Quartet, an American string quartet. Santaolalla liked the resulting music and deemed it ready for release. WEA, however, did not like the idea releasing an entirely instrumental album of experimental music, after the group had gained success with their more accessible style of music. In the end, WEA and Café Tacvba reached a compromise: if the band would record a second album of more conventional material, the label would release both as a double-disc package and sell it for the cost of a standard single-disc album.

As promised, the group returned to the studio to record an album of previously written material, and released Revés/Yo Soy in 1999. The album was a double-disc set, featuring both the band's instrumental music and the newly recorded album. The album is notable for its unconventional packaging style, designed by vocalist Rubén Isaac Albarrán. In addition, the album titles Revés (which translates to "reverse") and Yo Soy (a palindrome), exemplify the band's eccentricity. The album also featured two popular singles, "La Locomotora" and "La Muerte Chiquita", and a music video for "Revés", directed by Adolfo Dávila. The album won a Latin Grammy for Best Rock Album.

=== Hiatus and signing with MCA (2000–02) ===
After Revés/Yo Soy, the group would not release another album for four years. In the meantime, Café Tacvba contributed recordings to various projects such as the Amores Perros (2000) and Y tu mamá también (2002) soundtracks as well as the tribute album El Mas Grande Homenaje a Los Tigres del Norte (2001), which included a cover of "Futurismo y Tradición". In addition, guitarists Emmanuel del Real Díaz and Joselo Rangel produced a couple songs for Julieta Venegas: "Me Van a Matar" and "Disco Eterno". Rangel also began work on a solo album, Oso, in 2003, which was produced by Albarrán.

While Café Tacvba pursued these various projects, they were looking for a new recording contract; the WEA relationship had come to an end after a trio of compilations released in 2001: Tiempo transcurrido: The Best of Café Tacvba; a videos collection of the same name; and Lo Esencial de Café Tacvba, a triple-disc package containing the band's first three albums. Maverick Records, Madonna's label, reportedly attempted to sign Café Tacvba during this time; however, the band decided ultimately to sign with MCA Records in 2002.

=== Cuatro Caminos (2003–06) ===
When Café Tacvba began work on Cuatro Caminos, the band took a different approach than in the past. They decided to work with a live drummer, and recruited Victor Indrizzo and Joey Waronker. Secondly, they wanted to work with a couple choice producers besides Santaolalla and Kerpel; they recruited Dave Fridmann and Andrew Weiss. Released in June 2003, Cuatro Caminos was met with commercial and critical success. The album won a Grammys for Best Latin Rock/Alternative Album as well as two Latin Grammys for Best Alternative Album and Best Rock Song ("Eres").

The group toured extensively after the release of Cuatro Caminos, and released a live album of a performance in front of 20,000 people in Mexico City at El Palacio de los Deportes in October 2004. The album was called Un Viaje, and was a double-disc set. After the release of the album, the group took a three-year break from releasing music.

=== Sino (2007–2010) ===
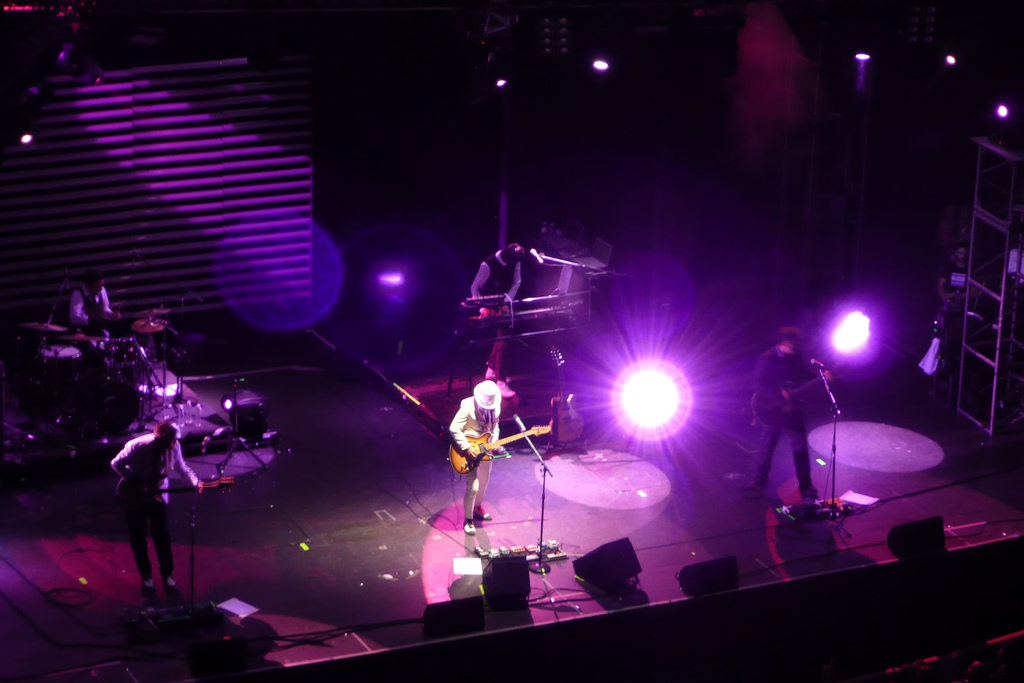
Café Tacvba performing in Buenos Aires, Argentina on February 22, 2008

In 2007 Café Tacvba returned with a new studio album, Sino. The album has been compared to classic rock groups such as The Who and the Beach Boys, a departure from their previous techno and funk-influenced sound. The band also performed on the main stage at Lollapalooza that summer. On September 10, 2008, Café Tacvba became the leading nominee at the Latin Grammy Awards of 2008 with a total of six nominations: Album of the Year and Alternative Music Album, for Sino. The lead single "Volver a Comenzar" was shortlisted for Record of the Year and Best Alternative Song, the second single "Esta Vez" received nominations for Best Rock Song and Song of the Year. The band took the record for most Latin Grammys won in one night. The inclusion of the song "Volver a Comenzar" in LittleBigPlanet projected the band internationally.

In 2008, the band collaborated with Puerto Rican duo Calle 13 on the song "No Hay Nadie Como Tú". The song peaked at number 23 on the Billboard Hot Latin Songs and number 15 on the Billboard Latin Rhythm Airplay.

Formerly graphic design students, Rubén, Joselo and Quique design their own album covers.

=== El Objeto Antes Llamado Disco (2012–2015) ===
Emmanuel stated in March 2012 that a new album was planned for release before the end of 2012. El Objeto Antes Llamado Disco was released on October 22, 2012. The album was recorded in front of live audiences in Mexico, Argentina, Chile, and the United States. The first single was "De Este Lado del Camino".

=== Jei Beibi (2016–present) ===
Café Tacvba released the single "Un Par de Lugares" in October 2016. On January 1, 2017 they released the single "Futuro", and on March 10, released another single called "Disolviéndonos" and the next week, the single "Que No" on March 24. With the release came the announcement of a new album, called "Jei Beibi" teased for release on May 5. It was released with the company ONErpm. In 2019, the band's equipment truck was robbed.

== Themes ==
Café Tacvba is also seen as a strong advocate for various causes due to the important social and political messages they discuss in their music. The themes of environmental justice and communal welfare are especially prevalent. In their song "Trópico de Cáncer" (1994), for example, the band references the disaster of San Juan Ixhuatepec, a catastrophic explosion of liquid petroleum gas tanks that killed 500–600 and injured 5000–7000 people on November 19, 1985. In "Trópico de Cáncer," Café Tacvba calls for a return to indigenous values of nature and community over the industrial capitalism responsible for so much suffering. This theme is apparent in the chorus of the song:

“Por eso yo ya me voy
No quiero tener nada que ver
Con esa fea relación de acción
Construcción, destrucción, ah, ah”

as well as other sections such as:

“Ay, mis compañeros, petroleros mexicanos
No crean que no extraño el olor a óleo puro
Pero es que yo pienso que nosotros, los humanos
No necesitamos más hidrocarburos”

— "Trópico de Cancer" (Café Tacuba),

== Members ==
=== Rubén Isaac Albarrán Ortega ===
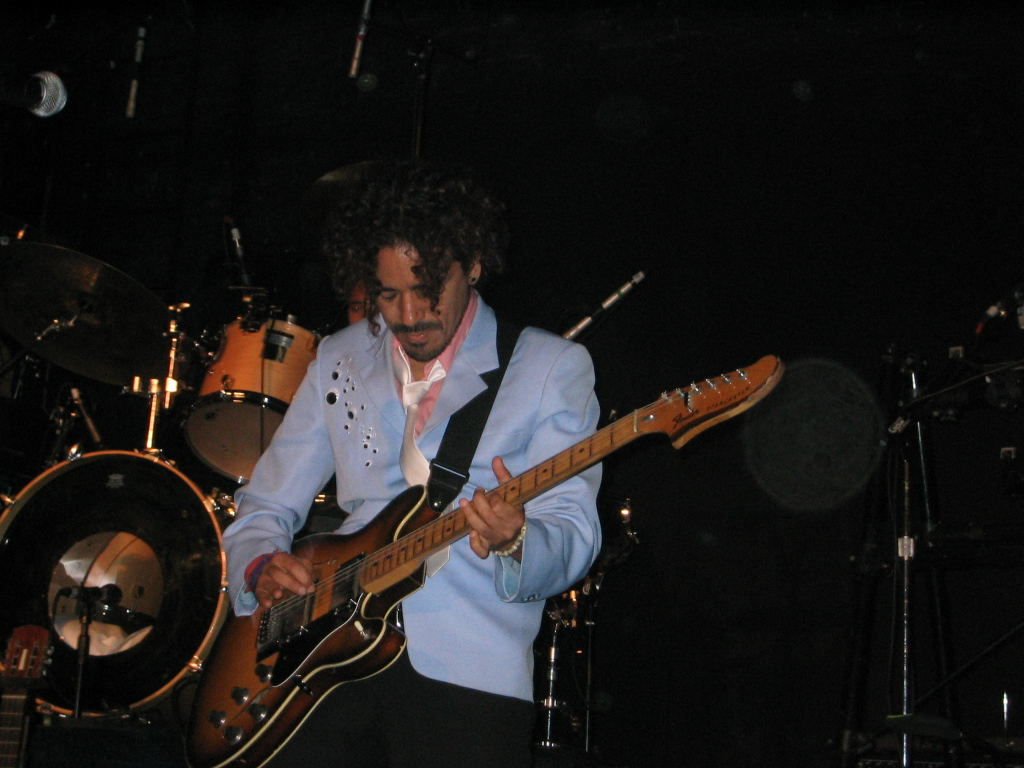
Rubén Isaac Albarrán

Vocalist and guitar player. Previously, until 2001, he played in an alternative band called Villa Jardín. In 2006 he announced his solo debut, Bienvenido al sueño (Welcome to the Dream), it consists of electronic instruments with Buddhist influences and Prehispanic Mexican which he describes as "música protónica por no limitarlo o estereotiparlo" (protonic music so as not to limit or stereotype it).

He is also known as "Juan", "Cosme", "Masiosare", "Anónimo" (Anonymous), "Nrü" (pronunciation given as "Dshiu" in Spanish; perhaps intended to be [dʒy]), "Amparo Tonto Medardo In Lak’ech" or "At Medardo ILK", "G3", "Gallo Gasss" (Gasss Rooster), "Élfego Buendía", "Rita Cantalagua", "Sizu Yantra", "Ixaya Mazatzin Tleyótl", "Ixxi Xoo" and now "Cone Cahuitl". He lived the first four years of his life in Monterrey. Studied at UAM (Universidad Autónoma Metropolitana) where he received a bachelor's degree in Design and Graphic Communication. Rubén, or however he is now known, has always pushed gender norms through provocative lyrics, and the occasional skirt worn on stage at concerts.

In the shows prior to the release of their first album, people would yell "Juan!" (the name of one of the band's first underground hits) to Rubén, so he kept the name for the release of the first album. Two years later he got bored and changed it to "Cosme" for the release of "Re". Since then, he has changed his name for every album and world tour.

In 2010, while on break from Café Tacvba, Rubén Albarrán formed a side project called HopPo! In the Dakota language, "Hoppo" means "Lets Go!" Albarrán briefly toured during the fall of 2010 in South and North America with HopPo!

Hoppo's self-titled debut album consists of Latin American folk cover songs, and no original material. This particular type of folk music, also known as Nueva Canción, was originally written in the 1960s and 1970s during a social movement of protest and anti-establishment sentiment by South American singer-songwriters and social activists. The album contains three songs written by Violeta Parra, including "Gracias a la vida".

=== Emmanuel Del Real ===
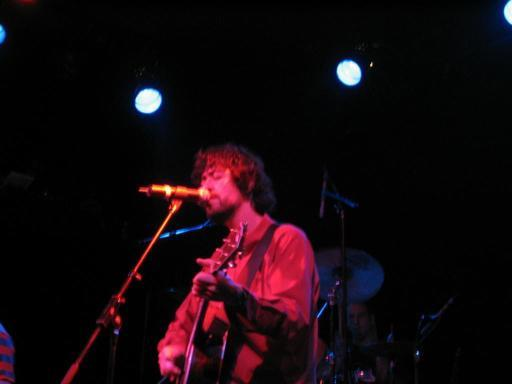
Emmanuel del Real in 2003

Emmanuel "Meme" del Real has been in the band from the moment they took the name Café Tacvba. Since the beginning he has been in charge of the keyboards, acoustic guitar, piano, music programming, vocals, melodeon, and melodica.

For a long time he only sang backup, but since the release of Re in 1992, he began singing lead on songs like El Borrego (The Lamb) or Pez (Fish), he also began playing the guitar more than before.

On the covers album Avalancha de Éxitos he plays guitar on No Controles (Don't Control). Since then he's also been known to play the jarana. Del Real has written some of the band's biggest hits such as La Ingrata (The Ingrate), Las Flores (The Flowers), Aviéntame (Throw Me) and Eres (You Are).

He is known in the Mexican electronica scene as "DJ Angustias"; is part of the Noiselab collective; and released a solo album in late 2005. Del Real has also produced songs for many Mexican artists like Julieta Venegas, Natalia Lafourcade, Ely Guerra, and Liquits, among others.

=== José Alfredo Rangel Arroyo ===
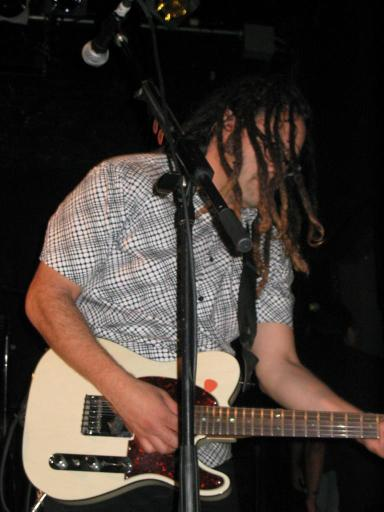
Joselo Rangel

José "Joselo" Alfredo Rangel, spent the first 9 years of his life in Minatitlán, Veracruz, until his family moved to Mexico DF where he studied industrial design in the UAM.

During his youth he had various hobbies like comic books and design even though he decided music was his major passion. While in college he met a person with a peculiar voice and extravagant ideas: Albarrán. They became best friends and with his brother, Enrique "Quique" Rangel and they formed a band called Alicia Ya No Vive Aquí.

Later on he started working on a new project called "Cafe Tacuba" with Ruben Albarran on the vocals, Enrique "Quique" Rangel on the bass (contrabajo) and Roberto Silva on the keyboards. Emmanuel del Real took the place of Roberto when he left before the band became famous.

After 13 years with the band Rangel decided to launch a solo side project. He has released two albums: the first, 2001's "Oso" (Bear), named after Joselo's childhood nickname; the second, titled "Lejos" (Far) in 2005.

He wrote four books, CRockónicas Marcianas (a compilation of chronicles, 2011), the collection od stories One hit wonder (2015), the novel Los desesperados (2018) and Cuba Stone (2016), a review of The Rolling Stones' concert in Cuba, in collaboration with Javier Sinay and Jeremías Gamboa.

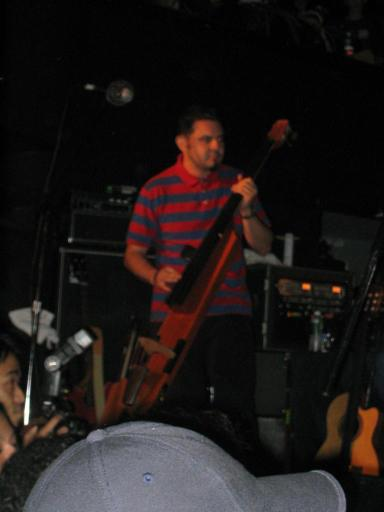
Quique Rangel

=== Enrique Rangel Arroyo ===
Enrique "Quique" Rangel Arroyo was a designer whose interest in music was influenced by his brother Joselo. He was introduced to Albarrán by Joselo and together, along with Beto Silva, formed "Cafe Tacuba". He abandoned his career as a designer when he brought the band De Real in the late 80s and they changed their name to Café Tacvba.

He designs album art for other bands and, like De Real, composes melodies for other groups. He is also a member of a side project called Los Odio.

=== Luis Ledezma ===
Also known as "El Children", Ledezma is the band's live drummer but is not considered an official band member.

=== Ramiro Del Real Díaz ===
A support musician that has been with the band since 2015 playing guitars, jarana and percussions. He is not considered an official band member.

== Genre ==
Their musical style covers a wide variety of genres, though it is most commonly labeled as Latin Alternative/Rock en Español. Their music has been heavily influenced by Mexico's indigenous population and folk music traditions, but also by punk and electronic music and other bands on the Mexico City scene. Perhaps the most distinctive feature of their music is Albarrán's nasal voice, which, combined with his impressive lung capacity (as demonstrated on "La Ingrata", a homage of norteño music), makes for a very distinctive sound. They sing entirely in Spanish but have a significant Anglophone following regardless.

The song "Chilanga Banda" has a hip-hop beat under a stream of Mexico City slang originally written by Jaime López, "María" is a 'bolero' ballad about a ghost, "El Fin de la Infancia" a brass-heavy 'banda ranchera' sound that reflects the influence of 'banda sinaloense', "Desperté" has a tango-driven melody while "El Borrego" mocks speed metal.

== Discography ==
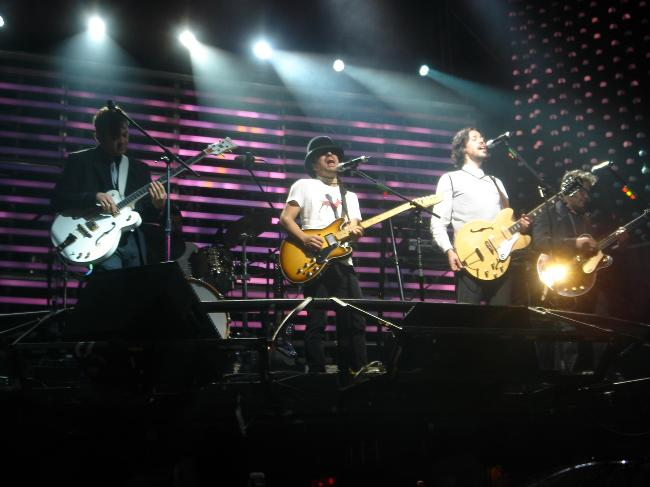
Bulldog Café, México, Distrito Federal

Every studio album released by the band so far has been produced by Gustavo Santaolalla except for Cuatro Caminos which was produced by Santaolalla, Dave Fridmann (The Flaming Lips, Weezer) and Andrew Weiss (Ween). Cuatro Caminos was featured on several Top Albums of 2003 charts, including Rolling Stone, The New York Times, Blender Magazine and won the 2004 Grammy Award for Best Latin Rock/Alternative Album.

=== Studio albums ===
- Café Tacuba (1992)
- Re (1994)
- Avalancha de Éxitos (1996)
- Revés/Yo Soy (1999)
- Cuatro Caminos (2003)
- Sino (2007)
- El Objeto Antes Llamado Disco (2012)
- Jei Beibi (2017)

=== Other albums ===
- MTV Unplugged (1995)
- Tiempo Transcurrido (2001) – best-of album with DVD included
- Vale Callampa (EP) (2002) – tribute album to Chilean band Los Tres
- Un Viaje (2005) – 15th anniversary concert (RIAA: Platinum)
- Un Segundo MTV Unplugged (2019)

== Awards and nominations ==
=== Grammy Awards ===
Year	Category	Nominated work	Result	Ref.
1998	Best Latin Rock/Alternative Performance	Avalancha de Éxitos	Nominated	
2000	Best Latin Rock/Alternative Performance	Revés/Yo Soy	Nominated	
2004	Best Latin Rock/Alternative Album	Cuatro Caminos	Won	
2014	Best Latin Rock, Urban or Alternative Album	El Objeto Antes Llamado Disco	Nominated	

=== Latin Grammy Awards ===
Year	Category	Nominated work	Result	Ref.
2000	Best Rock Album	Revés/Yo Soy	Won	
2004	Album of the Year	Cuatro Caminos	Nominated	
2004	Best Alternative Music Album	Cuatro Caminos	Won	
2004	Song of the Year	"Eres"	Nominated	
2004	Best Rock Song	"Eres"	Won	
2004	Best Short Form Music Video	"Eres"	Nominated	
2006	Best Alternative Music Album	Un Viaje	Nominated	
2006	Best Long Form Music Video	Un Viaje	Won	
2008	Album of the Year	Sino	Nominated	
2008	Best Alternative Music Album	Sino	Nominated	
2008	Record of the Year	"Volver a Comenzar"	Nominated	
2008	Best Alternative Song	"Volver a Comenzar"	Won	
2008	Song of the Year	"Esta Vez"	Nominated	
2008	Best Rock Song	"Esta Vez"	Won	
2009	Record of the Year	"No Hay Nadie Como Tú"	Won	
2009	Best Alternative Song	"No Hay Nadie Como Tú"	Won	
2013	Best Alternative Music Album	El Objeto Antes Llamado Disco	Nominated	
2014	Best Long Form Music Video	El Objeto Antes Llamado Disco: La Película	Won	
2017	Best Alternative Music Album	Jei Beibi	Won	
2017	Best Rock Song	"Que No"	Nominated	

Note: In 2000, Revés/Yo Soy also was nominated for Best Engineered, the nomination went to Joe Chiccarelli at the album's engineer.

== Appearances ==
- Emmanuel del Real and Chetes wrote and produced 16 De Febrero (February 16), the title song for the film Fuera del cielo (Beyond The Sky).
- The song "Eo" from Cuatro Caminos is featured on Electronic Arts FIFA Football 2004 video game.
- The song "Futurismo y Tradicion" is featured on Electronic Arts' FIFA Street 2 video game.
- The song "Volver a Comenzar" is featured in Media Molecule's LittleBigPlanet video game, as well as the Netflix film Chupa.
- The band played at The Lollapalooza Music Festival in Chicago, IL on August 5, 2007 and were greeted by an enthusiastic audience. Following their 45:00 set, they were brought back for three encores.
- On July 17, 2007, Cafe Tacvba unveiled a new song entitled "El Outsider" on a taping for Mun2's television show Vivo.
- They have contributed to movie soundtracks like Amores Perros, Y Tu Mamá También, Piedras Verdes and Vivir Mata as well as tribute albums to José José and Los Tigres del Norte. Café Tacvba also collaborated with different artists such as Plastilina Mosh, Kronos Quartet, David Byrne, Celso Piña, Maldita Vecindad, Sekta Core, Calle 13, Enanitos Verdes, Los Lobos and Control Machete. They have played live with Beck, Incubus, Los Lobos and Los Tres.
- Performed at 2013's Coachella Valley Music and Arts Festival.
