= Rubén Albarrán =

Mexican singer (born 1967)

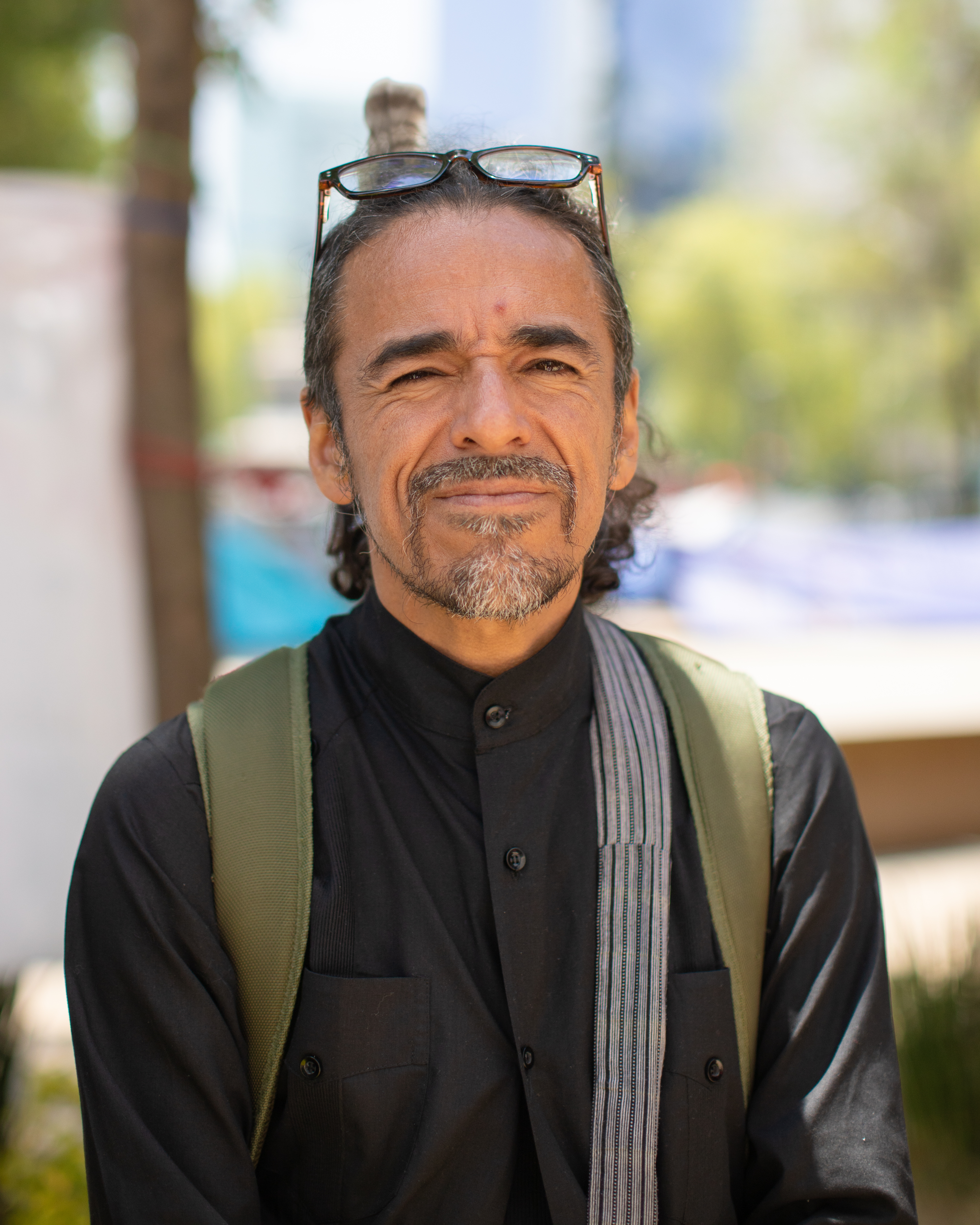

Background information
- Born: February 1, 1967 (age 59); State of Mexico, Mexico
- Genres: Alternative rock; Mexican rock
- Occupations: Singer; musician; songwriter
- Instruments: Vocals; guitar
- Years active: 1989–present
- Member of: Café Tacuba

Rubén Isaac Albarrán Ortega (born February 1, 1967) is a Mexican musician and a member and founder of the alternative rock band Café Tacvba. As singer and frontman of Café Tacvba, the artist has characterized himself by his energetic attitude onstage and for presenting himself as different characters and aliases throughout his career.

He started in music in the 1980s in the suburbs of Mexico City, forming Cafe Tacvba together with Joselo Rangel between 1988 and 1989, a group with which he gained international fame and made him worthy of the prizes Grammy and Grammy Latino. As a soloist he has released an album, Bienvenido al sueño and he formed the group Hoppo!, in addition to making duets and covers with diverse artists from Mexico and Latin America.

He is an environmental activist and has shown his support for various political causes like the Zapatista Army of National Liberation and the Yo Soy 132 movement, among others.

== Biography ==
Albarrán was born in the State of Mexico in 1967. He has three siblings. He spent the first five years of his life in Monterrey then returned to live in the Ciudad Satélite area, in a metropolitan area of the Mexican capital. He grew up with the eclectic influence of the music his parents listened to, who liked to sing often.

My parents sang daily (...) they sang everything that they listened to (...) they were always very musical, they liked what reached them, they accepted it and they sang it. Everything comes to me from there. (...) The first memory of when I said "I want to sing" comes from more or less four years. We were all in the car and they put on the radio the song that goes "Let the sunshine, let the sunshine, the sunshine in". And then I said I want to sing

— Rubén Albarrán

He had music as a hobby from secondary school, participating in school bands. Initially he wanted to play the electric guitar, but his parents insisted in buying him an acoustic, school teaching instrument which Albarrán studied, for which he broke it at the end of the course. His first guitar was a Sonatone, although afterwards he chose to be a vocalist.

In high school he already settled in to diverse musical groups that played at private parties like in bars in Ciudad Satélite in the mid-1980s. The first of them had names like Trial and Flanger, and the second was called Torah, a band playing their own compositions and covers of bands like The Police and artists like Charly García. Albarrán joined as a singer and he stood out for his talent in reaching high notes in songs by Led Zeppelin and Sting. Torah appeared as a band based in bars in the commercial area of Ciudad Satélite like Satelite Rocks, Spequio's and High Tower, in which bands with the record label Comrock played, including Ritmo Peligroso, Casino Shanghai and Mask, among others.

He met Joselo Rangel at the Universidad Autónoma Metropolitana, Azcapotzalco campus, shortly after the earthquake of 1985 when both were studying design (Joselo, industrial design; Rubén, graphic design), since Joselo had seen Rubén sing with Torah in the bar Rocks de Ciudad Satélite and Albarrán recognized Joselo as part of Shine, a band in which Joselo played bass. Both used their free time at university to listen to bands on a boombox, with cassettes that they recorded and finding affinity in listening to bands that their classmates did not listen to as much.

With Joselo I could share all that music that I couldn't with anyone else. So we spent a year at school without going to class, only listening to music. We listened on the playground, he brought his cassette recorder. And my girlfriend at that time also brought her recorder. We played cassettes of The Cure, La Unión, all the Spanish scene, Loquillo, Radio Futura. Then we started to talk of making the band.

— Rubén Albarrán

In 1987 they decided to form a band called Alicia ya no vive aquí, in which both could share their similarities, with a strong influence of Love and Rockets, La Unión and The Cure, which was joined by Joselo's brother Quique. The band made no appearances. One year after they decided to split up the band and they formed a new band: Café Tacvba.

== Career ==
Due to the arrival of his second child and as a tribute to his first, Rubén, together with his wife, decided to release Bienvenido al Sueño in 2006. For this project he called himself Sizu Yantra and his wife, Psikini. He was supported in his live appearances by a band of friends and relatives called Tepetokio.

In 2010 Rubén Albarrán formed the group Hoppo!, a Latin American folk song covers band, with two Chilean musicians and with Alejandro Flores, better known as "the fifth Tacvbo". In subsequent appearances various musicians were added to the project. In 2011, the band's appearances only consisted of Rubén and the Chilean musicians Rodrigo "El Chino" Aros and Juan Pablo "El Muñeco" Villanueva.

In addition to his records, Albarrán contributed in various beneficial associations.

In 2016, he participated in the dubbing of the film Moana: a sea of adventures performing the song "I know the way" together with Opetaia Foa'i.

== Collaborations ==
Albarrán has collaborated with numerous artists across various genres, often providing vocals for duets or special appearances.

- 1995: "Ella" with Enanitos Verdes on the album Guerra Gaucha.
- 1999: "Danzón" with Control Machete on Artillería Pesada Presenta....
- 2001: "Desconocido Soy" with David Byrne on the album Look into the Eyeball (credited as Nrü).
- 2002: "Amnesia" with Inspector and Roco Pachukote; "Son del Sol" with Fase; "Nadie Como" with Fermín IV.
- 2004: "Chale" with María Barracuda.
- 2005: "Horal" with León Gieco on Por favor, perdón y gracias.
- 2007: "La Luna" with Butumbaba; "Todas Las Mañanas" with Gabriel Aury (as Sizu Yantra).
- 2008: "No Hay Nadie Como Tú" with Calle 13 on Los de atrás vienen conmigo; "Perro Negro" with Lila Downs on Shake Away; "Aunque no sea conmigo" and "Si Mañana" with Celso Piña; "Haikú" with La Barranca.
- 2011: "El Poder Emborracha" with Desorden Público; "Corazón" with Los Auténticos Decadentes.
- 2013: "Vuelve" with Julieta Venegas on Los Momentos.
- 2016: "Saber Volver" (Spanish version of "We Know the Way") with Opetaia Foa'i for the Moana soundtrack.
- 2021: "Alquimia" with María León and La Bruja de Texcoco.
- 2022: "Volver a Solreír" with Aterciopelados.
- 2023: "Azcatl Cuecueyoca" with La Bruja de Texcoco.
- 2023: "Vengo por ti" with Octavia.

== Discography ==
=== With Café Tacvba ===
- Café Tacuba (1992)
- Re (1994)
- Avalancha de Éxitos (1996)
- Revés/Yo Soy (1999)
- Vale Callampa (2002)
- Cuatro Caminos (2003)
- Sino (2007)
- El Objeto Antes Llamado Disco (2012)
- Jei Beibi (2017)
- Un Segundo MTV Unplugged (2019)

=== With Hoppo! ===
- Hoppo! (2010)
- Ollin Rollin (2013)
- El Inmortal (2014)
- Te Vas al Sur (2016)
- La Maga y el Sadhu (2019)

=== As soloist (Sizu Yantra) ===
- Bienvenido al Sueño (2006)

== Other artistic projects ==
In 2011, together with Ofelia Medina he made the theatrical performance El placer de nuestra lengua, consisting of a histrionic montage with erotic poetry. The work had performances in Mexico, the United States and Spain.

=== Aesthetics ===
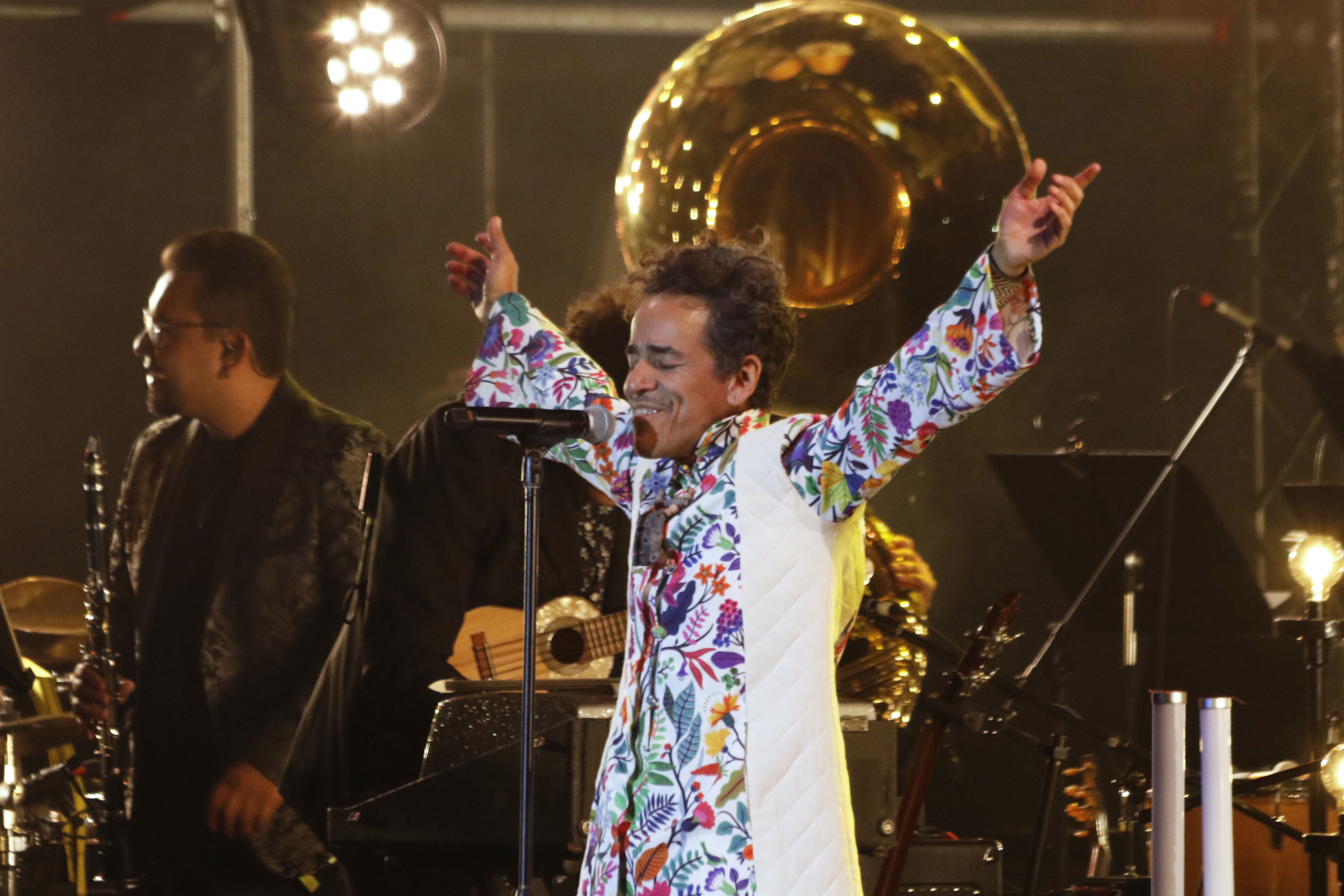
Albarrán performing in the 2022 Festival Internacional Cervantino.

Albarrán is described as having a unique aesthetic. As frontman of Café Tacvba, he experimented in the creation of temporary characters, and his performances feature an energetic attitude.

==== Alter egos ====
Albarrán's constant change of names is due to the creation of characters or alter egos. The singer has declared that he does it to "breathe fresh air" and free himself from "being Rubén". In an interview in the Argentine music magazine Los Inrockuptibles he mentions the origin of his constant name changes: "Sometimes I regret [being Rubén Albarrán] and other times I take it as a game. On one hand, I free myself from the weight of being Rubén, and on the other, it's a breath of fresh air – besides, in short, it's therapeutic for me."

In the era of the formation of Café Tacvba, Albarrán already was experimenting with his attire. In the words of Joselo when he spoke of it for the first time, "Rubén was on that occasion with a white hat and a bag, and it was a strange and interesting thing, because no vocalist saw themselves like that, they all like rockers, but not him."

- Pinche Juan: The first time that Albarrán used an alter ego was in 1990 when Café Tacvba started to play in underground places for rock in Spanish. At that time was a rise of the aesthetic of dark and punk bands, such as The Cure, so people went to bars like Tutti Frutti in Mexico City dressed in attire related to that subgenre. "They all had to come dressed in black, very dark. The joke was to make fun of that but at the same time we liked it", Albarrán said regarding the song "Pinche Juan", which is the Spanish form of "Johnny Rotten". Given the popularity of the track, people who saw him in the street started to shout "pinche Juan"; furthermore, Albarrán admired the band Ritmo Peligroso, whose members used pseudonyms, particularly the singer Piro Pendas, therefore he decided to adopt the pseudonym Juan for his appearance on the first album in 1992. In that era the band characteristically went out on stage in traditional Mexican clothing, an aesthetic they maintained until the release of their next album.
- Cosme: Café Tacvba wanted to create a concept album with Re. Part of the storyline is to do with the concept of duality in the beliefs of Mesoamerican people and ideas like teoatl tlahchinolli(es). Albarrán created the character of Cosme, dying his hair red, combing it to form small devil horns and wearing a red jacket and a checkered skirt. He took the name from the area of Rivera de San Cosme in Mexico City, where street vendors sold contraband since the 1970s.
- Anónimo (Anonymous): When recording Avalancha de Éxitos it was Quique who suggested the new name "Anónimo", and so in 1996 Anónimo appeared as the main voice of Café Tacvba.
- Massiossare (after a verse in the Mexican anthem): Rubén once more changed to be Massiossare during the few engagements that were left of the band and one occasion which was a collaboration with other bands.
- Nrü y Amparo Tonto Medardo In Lak'ech: Facing the creation of the double album Revés/YoSoy, being two different discs, he took two different names. On one side was Nrü (which supposedly comes from an abbreviation of the phrase "Núcleo Radio Üno") and on the other side was Amparo Tonto Medardo In Lak' ech. "Amparo tonto" for a national political scandal of the time; "Medardo", name of the Vizconde de Terralba in the fantasy novel The Cloven Viscount written by Italo Calvino; and In Lak'ech which in Maya means "I am another you"
- Rita Cantalagua: When Café Tacvuba took a year's break and split up, Rubén again changed his name, this time to Rita Cantalagua.. He explained its origin in an interview in 2001: "The Rita one I took from a German film called The Legends of Rita, and Cantalagua is a village I encountered on a trip around Mexico: one day I passed through here and I saw the sign "Hacienda Cantalagua". It sounded to me like canta el agua (the water sings)."
- Gallo Gassss: With the release of Vale callampa in tribute to Los Tres, Rubén was known as "Gallo Gassss" and performed in a white suit and a hat with a cockerel's crest.
- Ixaya Matatzin Tléyotl: Collectively given to him by his contacts on MySpace
- Elfego Buendía: The recording of Cuatro Caminos started in which Rubén returned transformed into "Elfego Buendía": Elfego in homage to one of his uncles who disappeared and Buendía after the family from the novel Cien años de soledad
- Cone Cahuitl
- Zopilote: a pseudonym used in 2012.

In 2013, with the release of the album El objeto antes llamado disco he decided to stick with his real name, which has remained until the present with the release of Jei beibi

== Activism ==
On top of his artistic work, Albarrán is an activist for different causes, primarily related to environmental protection and land protection. In 2012 he formed the collective Aho with other artists, a group in defense of sacred land of the indigenous Wixaricas, Wirikuta. In this year he publicly showed his support for the YoSoy132 movement. In 2013 he joined protests against the structural reforms of the government of Enrique Peña Nieto.

In 2015 he joined Manu Chao and Roco Pachukote to show support in favour of the conservation of the Amazon.

Albarrán is a supporter of the Zapatista Army of National Liberation. In 2018 he showed his support for the independent candidate María de Jesús Patricio Martínez, participating in public acts to back her.
