= Avalancha de Éxitos =

Studio album by Café Tacuba
- Released: November 5, 1996
- Genres: Latin Alternative, Rock en español
- Length: 31:25
- Label: Warner Music Mexico

Café Tacuba chronology
Re (1994)	Avalancha de Éxitos (1996)	Revés/Yo Soy (1999)

Professional ratings
Review scores
Source	Rating
Allmusic	4/5 stars

Avalancha de Éxitos (in Spanish: Avalanche of Hits) is Café Tacuba's third album. In 1996, two years after their acclaimed Re, the band had amassed enough new music to fill four CDs, but couldn't winnow it down to a single album. So instead, they covered eight songs by other Spanish-speaking artists, who ranged from totally obscure to well-known.

== Background ==
After the publication of Re, the band was between the releasing of the album and the subsequent tours as well as the fulfillment of the contract with Warner also continue in the scene while have proper time preparing their formal third LP. After their performance at Viña del Mar Festival in 1996, producer Gustavo Santaolalla proposed them a "transition album" made with covers, an idea that the group accepted. Since its formation the group used to perform versions of other bands that they liked.

== Composition ==
The concept of the album allowed Café Tacvba to focus on the creativity of the music, so they agreed to start the rehearsals by each member of the band bringing ideas of what songs would be included on the album. The group chose several songs related to the rock of Mexico of the 80s:

because we are sons of that. We feel that we are a link that is tied to that generation. They gave us the spark so that something in us could grow (...) It was also to say "this is, raw, what we gave us the music "

— Emmanuel del Real

The first round of songs chosen for the album included "Chilanga Banda" (Jaime López), "Estás Perdida" (Ritmo Peligroso), "Planet Earth" (Duran Duran) and "Una Mañana" (originally "Morning" by Clare Fischer, popularized with lyrics in Spanish as "Una Mañana" by José José), the same that the group had already performed for their 1995 MTV Unplugged and which would be published in Un Tributo (a José José) in 1998. Of the latter, Clare Fischer told to Warner production that he hated José José version and he agreed with the recording but with another lyrics so the band then refused to include the song, "we said that for us Clare Fischer did not mean anything, but José José yes", said about Joselo Rangel. Just Jaime López's "Chilanga Banda" remained, a song that the band met by Octavio Hernández, a journalist and cultural promoter from Tijuana.

"Metamorfosis" is a song by the Mexican band Axis, which performed at the concert venues in Ciudad Satélite area where the early band attended and which won the First Youth Rock Festival organized by Peerless label in 1985. Juan Luis Guerra's "Ojalá Que Llueva Café" was chosen by the band as it was a song they liked from the time they were students and was remade at the initiative of Meme as a son huasteco, given the previous work that was done by the band with maestro huapanguero Alejandro Flores in "Las flores" for the band's MTV Unplugged. "No me comprendes" by Bola de Nieve was Quique's suggestion, while the band unanimously decided «Alármala de tos» by Botellita de Jerez and "No controles", one of the hits in Mexico by Flans in the 80s —version to Spanish band Olé Olé— and that the group chose to listen to at the parties they attended. "Perfidia" published in 1939 by Alberto Domínguez was chosen from the beginning as an instrumental track in tribute to the instrumental music of the 60s such as Santo & Johnny and The Ventures. "Cómo te extraño", a 1964 song by Leo Dan was included at the suggestion by Warner executives. The title of Avalancha de éxitos is a word game that by one side pay homage to 60s and 50s names of compilation albums that only included hits of some musical groups and by the other refers to Avalancha a popular soap-box cart that is depicted on the front of the album artwork.

Among the rhythms included in the album are ska, bolero, heavy metal, post-rock, hip-hop, punk and son huasteco.

== Recording ==
Unlike their previous album Avalancha de éxitos was recorded in Mexico, at the band's first rehearsal venue in Naucalpan. The band used a console with equalizers provided by Gustavo Santaolalla with two microphones using an ADAT portable recorder. David Byrne participated in "No Controles". Some incidental noises caused by recording in a rehearsal room were left in the final product.

== Promotion ==
Avalancha de Éxitos was the band's first album to reach a high place on the US Billboard chart, peaking number 12. In Mexico, like the previous album Re, it would have a moderate reception. Outside of Mexico the album opened the doors to the Spanish-speaking market, taking them in addition to the United States and Chile, where they had already performed, on a two-and-a-half-month tour of countries in which they had not performed, including all of Central America, South America and Caribbean countries like Cuba and the Dominican Republic.

The promotional video for the album was that of "Chilanga banda" which was directed by Ángel Flores with art by Eugenio Caballero.

== Track listing ==
No.	Title	Original artist	Length
1.	"Chilanga Banda" (Chilanga Gang - "Chilanga" is slang for people from Mexico City's barrios)	Juan Jaime López	3:32
2.	"Metamorfosis" (Metamorphosis)	Axis	5:45
3.	"No Controles" (Don't Control Me)	Nacho Cano and Olé Olé	3:07
4.	"No Me Comprendes" (You Don't Understand Me)	Bola de Nieve	4:43
5.	"Alármala de Tos" (A made-up word coming from the title of Alarma!, a yellow journalism magazine, and mixed with a slang term used when you are threatening someone to keep quiet)	Botellita de Jeréz	4:06
6.	"Perfidia" (Perfidy. Instrumental)	Alberto Domínguez	3:08
7.	"Ojalá Que Llueva Café" (I Hope it Rains Coffee)	Juan Luis Guerra	3:27
8.	"Cómo Te Extraño Mi Amor" (How I Miss You My Love)	Leo Dan	3:39

== Band members ==
- Anónimo (Rubén Albarrán): vocals, guitar
- Emmanuel del Real: keyboards, acoustic guitar, piano, programming, vocals, melodion
- Joselo Rangel: electric guitar, acoustic guitar, vocals
- Quique Rangel: bass guitar, electric upright bass, vocals

== Charts ==
Chart (1996)	Peak position
US Top Latin Albums (Billboard)	28
US Latin Pop Albums (Billboard)	12
