= Café Tacuba (album) =

Studio album by Café Tacuba
- Released: July 28, 1992
- Studios: Bakery (Burbank, California, EE. UU.); Blue Palm Studio (Studio City, California, EE. UU.); Estudio Crystal; Kay'nah (México D.F., México); Mad Dog Studios (Venice, California, EE. UU.); Sound Emporium Studios (Nashville, Tennessee, EE. UU.)
- Genres: Latin Alternative, Rock en español, Folk punk
- Length: 39:46
- Label: WEA Latina
- Producer: Gustavo Santaolalla

Café Tacuba chronology
Café Tacuba (1992)	Re (1994)

Professional ratings
Review scores
Source	Rating
Allmusic	4/5 stars

Café Tacvba is the debut studio album by the alternative rock band Café Tacvba, released by Warner Music Group Latina on July 28, 1992. It was produced by Gustavo Santaolalla. Rubén Albarrán, the band's lead vocalist, was credited as "Juan, the one who pretends to sing" in the album's liner notes.

The sound of this first production reflects the underground format from which they originated. True to their initial aim of capturing a Mexican identity, the songs are ideologically taken toward a more acoustic and minimally sophisticated level, borrowing a bit from the punk spirit with which some of its members were musically trained.

The album's lyrics essentially provide doses of delirium, irony, and good humor, although there are also songs that tell enigmatic and passionate stories, such as "María" and "Las batallas" (the latter based on the novel Las batallas en el desierto by José Emilio Pacheco). The lyrics also make references to other songs: "Bar Tacuba" has fragments similar to "Tu recuerdo y yo" by José Alfredo Jiménez, and "Las batallas" has a verse from Pedro Flores' famous song "Obsesión", a song that Pacheco also references in his aforementioned novel.

The music video for the first single, "María", featured the celebrated actress Ofelia Medina. Many of the songs on the album, particularly "La chica banda" and "Labios jaguar", relate to the Indigenous and mestizo people of Mexico. It is the song the group has chosen to close several of their concerts.

Although this material showed Café Tacvba only as a band of light and fun songs, it received a favorable reception from the public and the press in their country and would leave solid songs in their repertoire.

== Track listing ==
No.	Title	Lead Vocals	Length
1.	"Noche Oscura" (Dark Night)	Juan	4:03
2.	"Las Batallas" (The Battles)	Juan	3:26
3.	"Las Persianas" (The Window Blinds)	Juan	2:54
4.	"Rarotonga"	Juan	2:51
5.	"María"	Juan	3:53
6.	"Cometer Suicidio" (To Commit Suicide)	Juan, Joselo	2:37
7.	"La Chica Banda" (The Gang Girl)	Juan	3:48
8.	"El Catrín" (The Wealthy Man)	Juan	2:50
9.	"Pinche Juan" (Fucking John)	Juan, Emmanuel, Joselo	0:34
10.	"Labios Jaguar" (Jaguar Lips)	Juan	2:20
11.	"Debajo del Mar" (Under the Sea)	Juan	3:00
12.	"La Zonaja" (The Red Light District)	Juan	3:03
13.	"Bar Tacuba"	Juan	3:52

Many of the songs on this album, notably "La Chica Banda" and "Labios Jaguar" makes reference of Native Americans and mestizos in Mexico. La Zonaja was about a 70s -80s gay bar called the 9, and not about a red light district.

== Band members ==
- Juan (Rubén Albarrán): vocals, guitar
- Emmanuel Del Real: keyboards, acoustic guitar, piano, programming, vocals, melodion
- Joselo Rangel: electric guitar, acoustic guitar, vocals
- Quique Rangel: bass guitar, electric upright bass, vocals
