= Cuatro Caminos (album) =

Studio album by Café Tacuba
- Released: July 1, 2003
- Genre: Pop rock; Latin alternative
- Length: 53:13
- Label: Universal Music Mexico
- Producer: Gustavo Santaolalla; Andrew Weiss; Dave Fridmann; Tony Peluso

Café Tacuba chronology
Vale Callampa (2002)	Cuatro Caminos (2003)	Un Viaje (2005)

Cuatro Caminos (English: Four Roads) is the fifth album by Mexican rock band Café Tacuba, released in 2003.

== Background ==
Cuatro Caminos was produced by Gustavo Santaolalla, Dave Fridmann (The Flaming Lips, Weezer) and Andrew Weiss (Ween).

The title Cuatro Caminos references the name of a major road intersection and metro station in Mexico City. The album is marked by wordplay, as in the song titles "Hoy Es" (sounds like "Oyes", meaning "You're Listening"), "Soy o Estoy", and "Hola Adiós" (sounds like "Hola a Dios", meaning "Hello to God"). Lead singer Rubén Albarrán was credited on this album as "Élfego Buendía". This was the first Café Tacuba album to use live drums instead of drum machines.

== Reception ==
Professional ratings
Review scores
Source	Rating
AllMusic	5/5 stars
The Austin Chronicle	4/5 stars
Blender	4/5 stars
Entertainment Weekly	B+
Los Angeles Times	3/4 stars
Mojo	4/5 stars
Pitchfork	8.7/10
The Rolling Stone Album Guide	4.5/5 stars
Spin	A

Cuatro Caminos was featured on year-end lists of the best albums of 2003 by several publications, including Rolling Stone, The New York Times and Blender. In 2004, it won a Grammy Award for Best Latin Rock/Alternative Album and two Latin Grammy Awards for Best Alternative Album and Best Rock Song for "Eres". Music website Club Fonograma named Cuatro Caminos the best album of the decade.

The song "Eo" appears in the soundtrack to the soccer video game FIFA Football 2004.

== Track listing ==
All tracks are written by Café Tacuba

No.	Title	Length
1.	"Cero y Uno" ("Zero and One")	3:52
2.	"Eo" (aka "Eo (El sonidero)"; "Eo (The Disc Jockey")	2:14
3.	"Mediodía" ("Midday")	3:56
4.	"¿Qué Pasará?" ("What Will Happen?")	2:20
5.	"Camino y Vereda" ("Path and Sidewalk")	4:05
6.	"Eres" ("You Are")	4:28
7.	"Soy o Estoy" ("Am I (in essence) or Am I (in state)")	2:48
8.	"Encantamiento Inútil" ("Useless Enchantment")	6:29
9.	"Recuerdo Prestado" ("Borrowed Memory")	3:30
10.	"Puntos Cardinales" ("Cardinal Points")	4:43
11.	"Desperté" ("I Woke Up")	3:09
12.	"Tomar el Fresco" ("To Take Fresh Air")	2:57
13.	"Hoy Es" ("Today Is")	5:01
14.	"Hola Adiós" ("Hello Goodbye")	3:41

== Personnel ==
- Elfego Buendía (Rubén Albarrán) – vocals, guitar
- Emmanuel del Real – keyboards, acoustic guitar, piano, programming, vocals, melodeon
- Joselo Rangel – electric guitar, acoustic guitar, vocals
- Quique Rangel – bass guitar, electric upright bass, vocals

== Guest musicians ==
- Victor Indrizzo - drums (tracks 1, 2, 4, 6, 9, 12, 13)
- Joey Waronker - drums (tracks 3, 5, 7, 8, 10, 11)
- Alejandro Flores - acoustic guitar, violin (track 13), jarana (track 4)
- Dave Fridmann - ensemble (track 14)

== Charts ==
Chart (2003)	Peak position
US Top Latin Albums (Billboard)	11
US Latin Pop Albums (Billboard)	4

== Certifications ==
Region	Certification	Certified units/sales
Mexico (AMPROFON)	Gold	50,000^{^}
^{^} Shipments figures based on certification alone.
