= List of works by Gustavo Santaolalla =

The Argentine musician Gustavo Santaolalla has been active in film, television, and video game scores, and his music has been used in other productions. The following is a list of his works.

== Works ==
Year	Title	Notes
1981	She Dances Alone	
1982	Santaolalla	
1995	GAS	
1998	Ronroco	Solo work, first release of "Iguazu"
1999	The Insider	Features his song, "Iguazu"
2000	Amores perros	
2003	21 Grams	
2004	Salinas grandes	TV
2004	The Motorcycle Diaries	BAFTA Award for Original Music Score. See also the soundtrack
2005	North Country	See also the soundtrack
2005	Yes	Features his song "Iguazu"
2005	Brokeback Mountain	Academy Award for Original Score. See also the soundtrack
2006	Fast Food Nation	Features his song "Iguazu"
2006	Babel	Academy and BAFTA Award for Original Score. See also the soundtrack
2007	Into the Wild	Features his song "Picking Berries"
2007	My Blueberry Nights	Features his song "Pájaros"
2008	Linha de Passe	
2009	I Come with the Rain	
2010	The Sun Behind the Clouds: Tibet's Struggle for Freedom	
2010	Nanga Parbat	
2010	Biutiful	
2010	Dhobi Ghaat	Hindi language Indian film
2012	On the Road	
2013	The Last of Us	Video game
2013	August: Osage County	
2014	The Book of Life	
2014	Wild Tales	Goya Award for Best Original Score
2014	Camino	Solo work
2015	Making a Murderer	
2015	Borrowed Time	Short
2016	Before the Flood	
2016	Qhapaq Ñan: Desandando El Camino	
2017	A Life in 12 Bars	
2017	To End a War	
2017	All That Divides Us	
2018	Narcos: Mexico	
2020	The Fight	
2020	The Last of Us Part II	Video game. Likeness also used in the game for a banjo player in Jackson.
2020	El Cid	
2021	Finch	
2021	Maya and the Three	Netflix miniseries
2022	The House	Netflix anthology film
2023–present	The Last of Us	HBO series
