= Wild Tales (soundtrack) =

Wild Tales (Original Motion Picture Soundtrack)

Film score by Gustavo Santaolalla and various artists
- Released: 17 October 2014
- Genre: Film score
- Length: 36:05
- Label: Quartet
- Producer: Gustavo Santaolalla; Aníbal Kerpel

Gustavo Santaolalla chronology
The Book of Life (2014)	Wild Tales (2014)	Making a Murderer (2015)

Wild Tales (Original Motion Picture Soundtrack) is the soundtrack to the 2014 black comedy anthology film Wild Tales (Spanish: Relatos salvajes) directed by Damián Szifron. The album featured eleven tracks—seven of them were cues from the film score composed by Gustavo Santaolalla and a compilation of four songs heard in the film. Quartet Records released the soundtrack on 17 October 2014.

== Development ==
Gustavo Santaolalla composed the original score for Wild Tales; his first ever Argentine film he composed. Szifron wanted an original score to accompany the film due to its importance of music and sent the film's script to Santaolalla through a mutual friend. While he was supervising the film's final edit to Pedro Almodóvar, he received Santaolalla's call saying that he liked the script. During a conversation in Belgium, Santaolalla told Szifron that he had curated the music for the title sequence that would be used in the film, which he felt "more than it could be expected".

The soundtrack to the film, besides accompanying Santaolalla's score, also featured other songs—"Love Theme from Flashdance", composed by Giorgio Moroder and performed by Helen St. John for the soundtrack to Flashdance (1983), Aire Lebre" by Lucien Belmond, Bobby Womack's 1968 cover of "Fly Me to the Moon" and "Titanium" (2011) by David Guetta and Sia. It also featured Santaolalla's own composition from his Academy Award-winning score for Babel (2006). The soundtrack was distributed by Quartet Records which set the release on 17 October 2014 in Spain, and internationally through 17 February 2015.

== Reception ==
A critic based at the Sight and Sound magazine described the soundtrack as "equally excellent". David Rooney of The Hollywood Reporter described the score as "terrific spaghetti Western-flavored". Gabriel Urbina of mxdwn wrote "The original score by Oscar winner Gustavo Santaolalla is understated but perfectly couches all of the film's emotional highs." Alonso Duralde of TheWrap wrote that "Gustavo Santaolalla weaves together a score that feels right for each separate part while also making each passage feel like part of a whole." Tom Meek of Paste described that the film's score "just feels more like a fancy, tacked on accoutrement than a cohesive piece." Martin Jensen of The Film Stage called it as "a throwback, yet also totally modern".

== Track listing ==
Wild Tales (Original Motion Picture Soundtrack) track listing
No.	Title	Artist(s)	Length
1.	"Relatos Salvajes"		1:52
2.	"Pasternak"		2:17
3.	"Las ratas"		3:40
4.	"Love Theme from Flashdance"	Giorgio Moroder; Helen St. John	3:28
5.	"El más fuerte"		3:42
6.	"Bombita"		3:07
7.	"Aire Libre"	Lucien Belmond	3:57
8.	"La propuesta"		6:33
9.	"Fly Me to the Moon"	Bobby Womack	2:06
10.	"Babel Short and Dialog"		1:17
11.	"Titanium"	David Guetta feat. Sia	4:06
Total length:			36:05

== Accolades ==
List of awards and nominations for Wild Tales (Original Motion Picture Soundtrack)
Award	Category	Result
CEC Awards	Best Score	Nominated
Goya Awards	Best Original Score	Nominated
Platino Awards	Best Original Music	Won
Silver Condor Awards	Best Original Music	Won
Sur Awards	Best Original Music	Won
