= List of awards and nominations received by Gustavo Santaolalla =

Gustavo Santaolalla awards and nominations
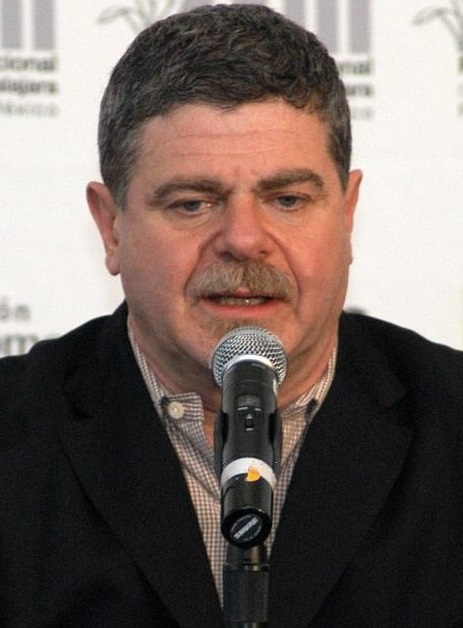
- Santaolalla at the 2008 Guadalajara International Film Festival
Awards and nominations
| Award | Wins | Nominations |
| Academy Awards | 2 | 2 |
| BAFTA Film Awards | 2 | 3 |
| BAFTA Games Awards | 0 | 2 |
| Golden Globes | 1 | 3 |
| Grammy Awards | 2 | 5 |
| Latin Grammy Awards | 17 | 36 |
| Primetime Emmy Awards | 0 | 2 |

Totals (Note: Certain award groups do not simply award one winner. They acknowledge several different recipients, have runners-up, and have third place. Since this is a specific recognition and is different from losing an award, runner-up mentions are considered wins in this award tally. For simplification and to avoid errors, each award in this list has been presumed to have had a prior nomination.)
- Wins: 57
- Nominations: 119

Argentine musician Gustavo Santaolalla has been nominated for and won numerous accolades during his career.

After becoming a leading figure in the rock en español movement, Santaolalla caught the attention of filmmakers that led to a career expansion into film scores. He won the BAFTA Award for Best Original Music for The Motorcycle Diaries (2004) and subsequently received two consecutive Academy Awards for Best Original Score for Brokeback Mountain (2005) and Babel (2006). He also won a Golden Globe Award for the song "A Love That Will Never Grow Old" from the Brokeback Mountain soundtrack and a second BAFTA Award for the Babel score.

Santaolalla is also known for his musical scores in The Last of Us media franchise, receiving two nominations at the BAFTA Games Awards for the soundtracks of the video games The Last of Us (2013) and The Last of Us Part II (2020), and a nomination at the Primetime Emmy Awards for his work in The Last of Us television series (2023–present).

Santaolalla has won two Grammy Awards for producing the Café Tacuba's studio album Cuatro Caminos (2003) and Juanes's La Vida... Es Un Ratico (2007). He is also the recipient of 17 Latin Grammy Awards, which include two Album of the Year wins, two Record of the Year wins, and the 2005 Producer of the Year award. In 2023, he received the Latin Grammy Trustees Award.

== Awards and nominations ==
=== Academy Awards ===
| Year | Category | Nominated work | Result | Ref. |
|---|---|---|---|---|
| 2006 | Best Original Score | Brokeback Mountain | Won | |
| 2007 | Best Original Score | Babel | Won | |

=== BAFTA Awards ===
| Year | Category | Nominated work | Result | Ref. |
British Academy Film Awards
| 2005 | Best Original Music | The Motorcycle Diaries | Won | |
| 2006 | Best Original Music | Brokeback Mountain | Nominated | |
| 2007 | Best Original Music | Babel | Won | |
British Academy Games Awards
| 2014 | Best Music | The Last of Us | Nominated | |
| 2021 | Best Music | The Last of Us Part II | Nominated | |

=== Golden Globes ===
| Year | Category | Nominated work | Result | Ref. |
|---|---|---|---|---|
| 2006 | Best Original Score | Brokeback Mountain | Nominated | |
| 2006 | Best Original Song | "A Love That Will Never Grow Old" (from Brokeback Mountain) | Won | |
| 2007 | Best Original Score | Babel | Nominated | |

=== Grammy Awards ===
| Year | Category | Nominated work | Result | Ref. |
|---|---|---|---|---|
| 2004 | Best Latin Rock or Alternative Album | Cuatro Caminos | Won | |
| 2007 | Best Score Soundtrack for Visual Media | Brokeback Mountain | Nominated | |
| 2008 | Best Score Soundtrack for Visual Media | Babel | Nominated | |
| 2009 | Best Latin Pop Album | La Vida... Es Un Ratico | Won | |
| 2021 | Best Latin Rock or Alternative Album | Aura | Nominated | |

=== Latin Grammy Awards ===
| Year | Category | Nominated work | Result | Ref. |
|---|---|---|---|---|
| 2000 | Best Rock Album | Revés/Yo Soy | Won | |
| 2001 | Album of the Year | Fíjate Bien | Nominated | |
| 2001 | Best Rock Solo Vocal Album | Fíjate Bien | Won | |
| 2001 | Record of the Year | "Fíjate Bien" | Nominated | |
| 2001 | Producer of the Year | — | Nominated | |
| 2003 | Album of the Year | Un Día Normal | Won | |
| 2003 | Best Rock Solo Vocal Album | Un Día Normal | Won | |
| 2003 | Record of the Year | "Es Por Ti" | Won | |
| 2003 | Record of the Year | "Frijolero" | Nominated | |
| 2003 | Best Classical Album | Nuevo | Nominated | |
| 2003 | Best Pop Instrumental Album | Bajofondo Tango Club | Won | |
| 2003 | Producer of the Year | — | Nominated | |
| 2004 | Album of the Year | Cuatro Caminos | Nominated | |
| 2004 | Best Alternative Music Album | Cuatro Caminos | Won | |
| 2004 | Producer of the Year | — | Nominated | |
| 2005 | Best Rock Solo Vocal Album | Mi Sangre | Won | |
| 2005 | Producer of the Year | — | Won | |
| 2006 | Best Tango Album | Café de Los Maestros | Won | |
| 2006 | Producer of the Year | — | Nominated | |
| 2007 | Album of the Year | Residente o Visitante | Nominated | |
| 2008 | Album of the Year | La Vida... Es Un Ratico | Won | |
| 2008 | Best Male Pop Vocal Album | La Vida... Es Un Ratico | Won | |
| 2008 | Album of the Year | Sino | Nominated | |
| 2008 | Record of the Year | "Me Enamora" | Won | |
| 2008 | Record of the Year | "Volver a Comenzar" | Nominated | |
| 2008 | Best Short Form Music Video | "Pa' Bailar" | Nominated | |
| 2011 | Producer of the Year | — | Nominated | |
| 2013 | Album of the Year | Presente | Nominated | |
| 2013 | Best Instrumental Album | Presente | Won | |
| 2013 | Best Alternative Song | "Pena en Mi Corazón" | Won | |
| 2015 | Best Instrumental Album | Camino | Nominated | |
| 2015 | Producer of the Year | — | Nominated | |
| 2017 | Best Alternative Music Album | Jei Beibi | Won | |
| 2020 | Record of the Year | "Solari Yacumenza" | Nominated | |
| 2020 | Best Norteño Album | Los Tigres del Norte at Folsom Prison | Won | |
| 2023 | Trustees Award | — | Honored | |
| 2025 | Best Music for Visual Media | Pedro Páramo | Nominated | |

=== Primetime Emmy Awards ===
| Year | Category | Nominated work | Result | Ref. |
|---|---|---|---|---|
| 2012 | Outstanding Original Main Title Theme Music | Hell on Wheels | Nominated | |
| 2024 | Outstanding Music Composition for a Series (Original Dramatic Score) | The Last of Us (episode: "Long, Long Time") | Nominated | |

== Other associatons ==
| Award | Year | Category | Nominated work | Result | Ref. |
|---|---|---|---|---|---|
| Annie Awards | 2022 | Best Music in an Animated Television/Broadcasting Production | Maya and the Three | Won | |
| Annie Awards | 2023 | Best Music in an Animated Television/Broadcasting Production | The House | Nominated | |
| Argentine Academy of Cinematography Arts and Sciences Awards | 2011 | Best Original Score | Revolución: el cruce de los Andes | Nominated | |
| Argentine Academy of Cinematography Arts and Sciences Awards | 2014 | Best Original Score | Wild Tales | Won | |
| Argentine Film Critics Association Awards | 2005 | Best Music | The Motorcycle Diaries | Won | |
| Argentine Film Critics Association Awards | 2009 | Best Documentary Screenplay | Café de Los Maestros | Nominated | |
| Argentine Film Critics Association Awards | 2009 | Best Music | Café de Los Maestros | Nominated | |
| Argentine Film Critics Association Awards | 2010 | Bicentenary Award | — | Honored | |
| Argentine Film Critics Association Awards | 2015 | Best Music | Wild Tales | Won | |
| Ariel Awards | 2001 | Best Original Score | Amores perros | Nominated | |
| Ariel Awards | 2011 | Best Original Score | Biutiful | Nominated | |
| Ariel Awards | 2025 | Best Original Score | Pedro Páramo | Nominated | |
| BMI Film & TV Awards | 2006 | Best Film Music | Brokeback Mountain | Won | |
| BMI Latin Awards | 2008 | Icon Award | — | Honored | |
| Brazilian Academy Film Awards | 2009 | Best Documentary Feature | Café de Los Maestros | Nominated | |
| Brazilian Academy Film Awards | 2009 | Best Soundtrack | Café de Los Maestros | Nominated | |
| Brazilian Academy Film Awards | 2009 | Best Original Score | Linha de Passe | Nominated | |
| CEC Awards | 2015 | Best Score | Wild Tales | Nominated | |
| Chicago Film Critics Association Awards | 2005 | Best Original Score | Brokeback Mountain | Won | |
| Chicago Film Critics Association Awards | 2006 | Best Original Score | Babel | Nominated | |
| Clarín Awards | 2004 | Best Original Film Music | The Motorcycle Diaries | Won | |
| Critics' Choice Awards | 2006 | Best Composer | Brokeback Mountain | Nominated | |
| Critics' Choice Awards | 2007 | Best Composer | Babel | Nominated | |
| Diosas de Plata | 2025 | Best Music | Pedro Páramo | Nominated | |
| Fun & Serious Game Festival Awards | 2020 | Best Soundtrack | The Last of Us Part II | Won | |
| The Game Awards | 2020 | Best Score and Music | The Last of Us Part II | Nominated | |
| Goya Awards | 2011 | Best Original Score | Biutiful | Nominated | |
| Goya Awards | 2015 | Best Original Score | Wild Tales | Nominated | |
| Hollywood Film Awards | 2006 | Composer of the Year | Babel and Brokeback Mountain | Won | |
| Hollywood Music in Media Awards | 2014 | Best Original Score in an Animated Film | The Book of Life | Nominated | |
| Hollywood Music in Media Awards | 2016 | Best Original Score in a Documentary | Before the Flood | Nominated | |
| Hollywood Music in Media Awards | 2021 | Best Original Score in a Video Game | The Last of Us Part II | Nominated | |
| Hollywood Music in Media Awards | 2022 | Best Original Score in a Streamed Animated Film (No Theatrical Release) | The House | Nominated | |
| Imagen Awards | 2022 | Best Music Composition for Film or Television | Maya and the Three | Nominated | |
| Imagen Awards | 2023 | Best Music Composition for Film or Television | The Last of Us | Won | |
| Imagen Awards | 2025 | Best Music Composition for Film or Television | The Last of Us | Won | |
| International Cinephile Society Awards | 2006 | Best Original Score | Brokeback Mountain | Runner-up | |
| Las Vegas Film Critics Society Awards | 2005 | Best Score | Brokeback Mountain | Won | |
| Online Film Critics Society Awards | 2006 | Best Original Score | Brokeback Mountain | Won | |
| Online Film Critics Society Awards | 2007 | Best Original Score | Babel | Nominated | |
| Platino Awards | 2015 | Best Original Score | Wild Tales | Won | |
| Platino Awards | 2025 | Best Original Score | Pedro Páramo | Nominated | |
| Premios Gardel | 2015 | Best Instrumental/Fusion/World Music Album | Camino | Won | |
| Premios Gardel | 2018 | Best Singer-Songwriting Album | Raconto | Won | |
| Premios Gardel | 2021 | Best Catalog Collection Album | Santaolalla (2020 Remaster) | Nominated | |
| Premios Gardel | 2021 | Best Cinema/Television/Audiovisual Production Soundtrack Album | The Last of Us Part II | Won | |
| Premios Gardel | 2023 | Best Cinema/Television/Audiovisual Production Soundtrack Album | The House | Won | |
| Premios Gardel | 2024 | Best Cinema/Television/Audiovisual Production Soundtrack Album | The Last of Us season 1 | Won | |
| Premios Gardel | 2025 | Best Cinema/Television/Audiovisual Production Soundtrack Album | Pedro Páramo | Won | |
| Premios Gardel | 2025 | Producer of the Year | — | Won | |
| Premios Gardel | 2026 | Best Cinema/Television/Audiovisual Production Soundtrack Album | The Last of Us season 2 | Won | |
| Premios Gardel | 2026 | Producer of the Year | — | Nominated | |
| San Diego Film Critics Society Awards | 2006 | Best Score | Babel | Won | |
| Satellite Awards | 2005 | Best Original Score | Brokeback Mountain | Nominated | |
| Satellite Awards | 2005 | Best Original Song | "A Love That Will Never Grow Old" (from Brokeback Mountain) | Won | |
| Satellite Awards | 2006 | Best Original Score | Babel | Won | |
| Society of Composers & Lyricists Awards | 2024 | Outstanding Original Score for a Television Production | The Last of Us | Nominated | |
| Society of Composers & Lyricists Awards | 2026 | Outstanding Original Score for a Television Production | The Last of Us | Nominated | |
| SoundTrack Cologne Awards | 2024 | Lifetime Achievement Award | — | Honored | |
| World Soundtrack Awards | 2004 | Discovery of the Year | 21 Grams | Won | |
| World Soundtrack Awards | 2006 | Best Original Score of the Year | Brokeback Mountain | Nominated | |
| World Soundtrack Awards | 2006 | Public Choice Award | Brokeback Mountain | Won | |
| World Soundtrack Awards | 2006 | Best Original Song Written Directly for a Film | "A Love That Will Never Grow Old" (from Brokeback Mountain) | Nominated | |
| World Soundtrack Awards | 2015 | Best Original Song Written Directly for a Film | "The Apology Song" (from The Book of Life) | Won | |
| World Soundtrack Awards | 2025 | Television Composer of the Year | The Last of Us season 2 | Nominated | |
