= Lou Hamou-Lhadj =

American director and animator

Lou Hamou-Lhadj is an American director, animator and writer at Pixar. He is best known for his work on film Borrowed Time, which together with Andrew Coats, he directed, wrote and released independently through Quorum Films, LLC. Hamou-Lhadj is nominated for the Academy Award for Best Animated Short Film at 89th Academy Awards, that he shares with Andrew Coats.

== Filmography ==
| Year | Film | Role |
|---|---|---|
| 2025 | Win or Lose | Director - Episode 8: "Home" |
| 2022 | Turning Red | Character modeling artist |
| 2020 | Onward | Character modeling lead |
| 2018 | Incredibles 2 | Character modeling artist |
| 2016 | Borrowed Time | Director Writer Production designer |
| 2015 | The Good Dinosaur | Character modeling lead |
| 2014 | Toy Story That Time Forgot | Character modeling artist |
| 2012 | Brave | Character modeling artist |
| 2010 | Toy Story 3 | Character modeling artist |
| 2010 | Day & Night | Ink and Paint Lead |
| 2009 | Partly Cloudy | Character modeling artist |
| 2008 | WALL-E | Character modeling artist |

== Awards and nominations ==
| Year | Award | Category | Work | Result | Ref. |
|---|---|---|---|---|---|
| 2014 | Visual Effects Society Awards | Outstanding Animated Character in a Broadcast Program or Commercial | Toy Story of Terror! | Won | |
| 2015 | SIGGRAPH | Best In Show | Borrowed Time | Won | |
| 2015 | St. Louis International Film Festival | Best Animated Short | Borrowed Time | Won | |
| 2016 | Brooklyn Film Festival | Best Animated Short | Borrowed Time | Won | |
| 2016 | Fastnet Short Film Festival | Best Cinematography | Borrowed Time | Won | |
| 2016 | USA Film Festival | First Place: Animation | Borrowed Time | Won | |
| 2016 | Woods Hole Film Festival | Best Animated Short | Borrowed Time | Won | |
| 2016 | Academy Awards | Best Animated Short Film | Borrowed Time | Nominated | |
| 2026 | Annie Awards | Outstanding Achievement for Character Design in an Animated Television/Broadcast Production | Win or Lose | Nominated | |
| 2026 | Children's and Family Emmy Awards | Outstanding Directing for an Animated Series | Win or Lose | Won | |
