= Andrew Coats (director) =

American director, writer and animator

Andrew Coats is an American director, writer and animator at Pixar. He received critical appraisal and recognition with 2016 animated-short film Borrowed Time which he co-directed, wrote and released independently as a part of Pixar Co-op Program, which allow their animators to use Pixar sources to make independent films. Coats received an Academy Award for Best Animated Short Film nomination at the 89th Academy Awards, shared with Lou Hamou-Lhadj.

== Filmography ==
Year	Film	Role
2007	Little Einsteins	TV series, CG modeler - 1 episode
2008	Horton Hears a Who!	Assistant animator
2008	Surviving Sid	Video short, animator
2009	Ice Age: Dawn of the Dinosaurs	Animator
2011	Rio	Animator
2011	Cars 2	Animator
2012	Brave	Animator
2012	The Legend of Mor'du	Video short, animator
2013	Toy Story of Terror!	TV Short, animator
2015	Inside Out	Animation character developer
2015	The Good Dinosaur	Animator
2016	Borrowed Time	Short, Co-animator/co-director/co-writer/co-production designer
2016	Finding Dory	Animator
2017	Cars 3	Pixar Studio Team - Promotional Animation
2018	Incredibles 2	Animator
2019	Smash and Grab	Animator
2024	Inside Out 2	Animator

== Awards and nominations ==
Year	Award	Category	Work	Recipients	Result	Ref.
2014	Visual Effects Society Awards	Outstanding Animated Character in a Broadcast Program or Commercial	Toy Story of Terror!	Paul Aichele; Kiki Mei Kee Poh	Won	
2015	SIGGRAPH	Best In Show	Borrowed Time	Andrew Coats; Lou Hamou-Lhadj	Won	
2015	St. Louis International Film Festival	Best Animated Short	Borrowed Time	Andrew Coats; Lou Hamou-Lhadj	Won	
2016	Brooklyn Film Festival	Best Animated Short	Borrowed Time	Andrew Coats; Lou Hamou-Lhadj	Won	
2016	Fastnet Short Film Festival	Best Cinematography	Borrowed Time	Luke Martorelli	Won	
2016	USA Film Festival	First Place: Animation	Borrowed Time	Andrew Coats; Lou Hamou-Lhadj	Won	
2016	Woods Hole Film Festival	Best Animated Short	Borrowed Time	Andrew Coats; Lou Hamou-Lhadj	Won	
2016	Academy Awards	Best Animated Short Film	Borrowed Time	Andrew Coats; Lou Hamou-Lhadj	Nominated	
