= Borrowed Time (film) =

2015 film

- Film poster
- Directed by: Andrew Coats; Lou Hamou-Lhadj
- Written by: Andrew Coats; Lou Hamou-Lhadj; Mark C. Harris
- Produced by: Amanda Deering Jones
- Starring: Nick Pitera; Greg Dykstra; Steve Purcell
- Cinematography: Luke Martorelli
- Edited by: Kathy Toon
- Music by: Gustavo Santaolalla
- Production company: Quorum Films
- Release dates: October 31, 2015 (Austin Film Festival); October 14, 2016
- Running time: 7 minutes
- Country: United States
- Language: English

Borrowed Time is a 2015 American animated Western short film directed by Pixar artists Andrew Coats and Lou Hamou-Lhadj.

== Plot ==
In the Old West, a sheriff and his young son are traveling on a wagon trail. The sheriff gives his son his own pocket watch and his hat for good luck. During their trek, their stagecoach is attacked by bandits. While the sheriff attempts to fend off their attackers, the son drives the wagon, but loses control when it collides with a rock, breaking a wagon wheel, and causing the sheriff to be flung over a nearby cliff's edge. The son recovers, and observes the damage. As he looks around, he finds his father hanging on to a lower rock ledge. Attempting to reach his father with his hand, he isn't able to reach him; subsequently, the sheriff hands his son his rifle for additional leverage, and the son begins to pull him up. Before the son can pull his father to the top of the cliff, he puts his finger inside the trigger guard and accidentally fires the rifle, killing his father by mistake, leaving the young son traumatized.

Many years later, the son has risen to the office of the sheriff, and visits the cliff where his father died. Reliving the events of that day, he contemplates suicide, unable to cope with the guilt. He allows himself to slip off the cliff's edge, but when he sees the pocket watch his father gave him, he attempts to climb back onto the cliff, almost falling off in the process. He manages to get back up and retrieves the pocket watch, then breaks down crying. He cradles the watch in his hands and breathes deeply in a short moment of solace. He holds the watch close to his heart, and it starts ticking again.

== Production ==
The short took roughly five years to develop, from 2010 to 2015, as a part of Pixar's Co-op Program, which allows their animators to use Pixar resources to produce independent films. The directors worked on the film in their spare time, while remaining full-time at Pixar and contributing to projects such as Inside Out, Brave, The Good Dinosaur, and WALL-E, along with shorts such as Toy Story That Time Forgot, Day & Night, Toy Story of Terror!, and Partly Cloudy.

== Accolades ==
List of awards and nominations
Year	Award	Category	Recipients	Result
2015	SIGGRAPH	Best In Show	Andrew Coats; Lou Hamou-Lhadj	Won
2015	St. Louis International Film Festival	Best Animated Short	Andrew Coats; Lou Hamou-Lhadj	Won
2016	Brooklyn Film Festival	Best Animated Short	Andrew Coats; Lou Hamou-Lhadj	Won
2016	Fastnet Short Film Festival	Best Cinematography	James Campbell & Luke Martorelli	Won
2016	USA Film Festival	First Place: Animation	Andrew Coats; Lou Hamou-Lhadj	Won
2016	Woods Hole Film Festival	Best Short Animation	Andrew Coats; Lou Hamou-Lhadj	Won
2017	Academy Awards	Best Animated Short Film	Andrew Coats; Lou Hamou-Lhadj	Nominated
2017	22nd Empire Awards	Best Short Film	Andrew Coats; Lou Hamou-Lhadj	Nominated
2017	Reel Shorts Film Festival	Best Animated Short	Andrew Coats; Lou Hamou-Lhadj	Won

The short was included in The Animation Showcase for 2016.
