= Camino (album) =

Studio album by Gustavo Santaolalla
- Released: July 8, 2014
- Recorded: La Casa, Los Angeles, California
- Genre: folk, acoustic, country, instrumental
- Length: 35:43
- Label: Masterworks
- Producer: Aníbal Kerpel, Gustavo Santaolalla

Gustavo Santaolalla chronology
Camino (2014)	Making a Murderer (2015)

Camino is a solo album by Argentinian musician Gustavo Santaolalla. It was released on July 8, 2014 on Sony Masterworks and it was recorded at La Casa in Los Angeles, California by Aníbal Kerpel as well as mixed by Kerpel and Santaolalla, and mastered at The Mastering Lab by Kerpel, Doug Sax and Jett Galindo. The album contains 13 original instrumental songs composed by Santaolalla.

== Critical reception ==
Professional ratings
Review scores
Source	Rating
AllMusic	4/5 stars
PopMatters	7/10 stars

The album has received positive reviews from critics.

== Track listing ==
All tracks written by Gustavo Santaolalla.

No.	Title	Length
1.	"Alma"	2:34
2.	"Vamos"	3:00
3.	"Requiem"	1:48
4.	"Cordón de Plata"	2:54
5.	"Ella"	1:40
6.	"The Maze"	2:35
7.	"Paraná"	3:28
8.	"Wait and Then"	2:47
9.	"Through The Rainwall"	2:36
10.	"Joaillerie"	1:59
11.	"The Journey"	2:54
12.	"Seguir"	3:44
13.	"Returning"	3:44

== Personnel ==
- Gustavo Santaolalla – bass, bass Harmonica, cuatro, guitarrón, keyboards, percussion, ronroco, tres, guitar, pipe
- Gabe Witcher (Punch Brothers) – fiddle on "Vamos"
- Aníbal Kerpel – additional keyboards
- Roxanne Slimak – art direction

== Charts ==
Chart (2014)	Peak position
US World Albums (Billboard)	8
