= Steve Purcell =

American cartoonist and video game designer

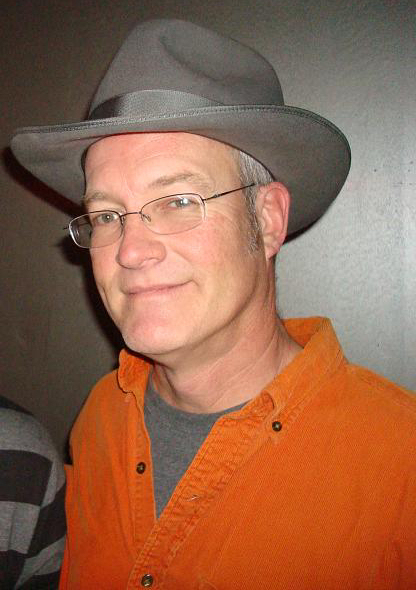
- Purcell at the 2008 Game Developers Conference in San Francisco
- Born: Steven Ross Purcell; July 30, 1961 (age 65)
- Education: California College of Arts and Crafts
- Occupations: Cartoonist, animator, game designer, voice actor, director, writer
- Years active: 1984–present
- Employers: LucasArts (1988–1997); Nelvana (1997–2000); Pixar Animation Studios (2000–2023)
- Notable work: Sam & Max
- Spouse: Collette Michaud (m. 1993)
- Children: 2
- Website: Personal blog

Steven Ross Purcell (born July 30, 1961) is an American cartoonist, animator, game designer, and voice actor. He is a co-creator of the comic book series and media franchise Sam & Max and received an Eisner Award in 2007 for working on the comic books. The franchise has expanded to an animated television series and several video games.

A graduate of the California College of Arts and Craft in Oakland, California in 1982, Purcell began his career creating comic strips for the college newsletter. He performed freelance work for Marvel Comics and Fishwrap Productions before publishing his first Sam & Max comic in 1987. He was hired by LucasArts as an artist and animator in 1988 and worked on several LucasArts adventure games, including the first two Monkey Island games, Indiana Jones and the Last Crusade and Sam & Max Hit the Road.

Purcell collaborated with Nelvana to create a Sam & Max television series in 1997, and briefly worked as an animator for Industrial Light & Magic after leaving LucasArts. At Pixar, he co-wrote and co-directed the 2012 film Brave and developed a miniseries for the Cars franchise, Cars on the Road.

== Career ==
=== Early career ===
Purcell began creating comic books while an undergraduate at the California College of the Arts in 1980; he produced comic strips for the weekly newsletter. The strips featured Sam and Max, an anthropomorphic dog and rabbit duo who work as vigilantes and private investigators. Purcell drew the first strip the night before the deadline. After graduating in 1982, he became involved in freelance illustration working briefly for Marvel Comics, Chaosium, and on Steven Moncuse's Fish Police series. Moncuse approached Purcell about the possibility of another comic book series to accompany his well-performing Fish Police series in 1987. Purcell agreed, and wrote his first feature-length comic using the characters of Sam and Max. The 32-page comic was published by Fishwrap Productions in 1987. The comic contained two Sam & Max stories: "Monkeys Violating the Heavenly Temple", a name which Purcell found on a firework and thought was appropriate; and "Night of the Gilded Heron-Shark". Purcell published another story in a 1987 issue of Critters titled "Night of the Cringing Wildebeest". The three stories established the basics for Purcell's future work with the characters.

=== LucasArts ===
Purcell was hired by LucasArts, then known as Lucasfilm Games, as an animator in 1988 but was laid off when the project he was working on was canceled. He was rehired to produce art for Zak McKracken and the Alien Mindbenders, a graphic adventure game . Later he was commissioned to create the cover artwork for Maniac Mansion and the first two Monkey Island games and researched whips for the adventure game version of Indiana Jones and the Last Crusade. He worked with animation in several LucasArts adventure games, published three more Sam & Max comic books during that time, and created short comic strips for LucasArts' quarterly newsletter, The Adventurer. The characters eventually became training materials for LucasArts programmers working with SCUMM, the core game engine used by LucasArts adventure games.

Purcell created versions of Sam and Max in their office for new programmers to work on under Ron Gilbert, practicing their craft. References to the characters were occasionally made in unrelated LucasArts adventure games as a clandestine appearance in backgrounds. Purcell wrote the six-issue comic book series Defenders of Dynatron City for Marvel Comics in 1992.

A 1988 issue of Sam & Max, published by Comico; Purcell has been surprised at the cult status the characters acquired Note the rat on the car's grille, a common theme in Purcell's work.

After a positive reception to the Sam & Max strips in The Adventurer and wanting to expand into other franchises following Maniac Mansion and Monkey Island, LucasArts offered to create a graphic adventure game based on the characters in 1992. Sam & Max Hit the Road was conceived and developed by a small team headed by Purcell, Sean Clark, Michael Stemmle and Collette Michaud. Purcell decided to base the game on one of his earlier Sam & Max stories, the 1988 story "On The Road". In 1995, Purcell combined all published Sam & Max printed media into a 154-page paperback compilation titled Sam & Max: Surfin' the Highway. After producing the cover art for Herc's Adventures and concept art for The Curse of Monkey Island, Purcell left LucasArts.

=== Later work ===
Purcell joined with story editor Dan Smith from Canadian studio Nelvana to create an animated television series of Sam & Max in 1996. The result was the 1997 series The Adventures of Sam & Max: Freelance Police, broadcast on Fox Kids in the United States, YTV in Canada and Channel 4 in the United Kingdom. Purcell wrote the jokes for each installment of the 24-episode series, and wrote the scripts for four episodes. Although violence and profanity common in the Sam & Max franchise had been toned down due to the target audience of children, Purcell was content that the characters maintained their moral ambiguity. Some groups of parents in the United States attempted to have the series pulled from networks due to content issues; Purcell was pleased that they "had managed to ruffle some feathers along the way". Two Sam & Max comic strips appeared in Fox's Totally Fox Kids Magazine in 1998 to accompany the series; other Sam & Max strips appeared in Wizard and Oni Double Feature. During the development of the television series in 1997, Purcell co-authored and illustrated the Hellboy Christmas Special with Mike Mignola and Gary Gianni. After the conclusion of the Sam & Max animated series, Purcell was briefly employed by Industrial Light & Magic to work on digital effects for a film version of Frankenstein. Despite his work, the project was canceled; Purcell believes that some of the development work morphed into ILM's contributions to Van Helsing. While at ILM, he was involved in a project to create an animated film based on Monkey Island; while the project did not reach fruition, Purcell began posting concept art he had produced for the film on his personal blog several years later.

=== Pixar and Telltale Games ===
After a brief stint at ILM, Purcell moved to Pixar. Although he worked at Pixar, Purcell acted as an advisor in the development of Sam & Max: Freelance Police, a sequel to Sam & Max Hit the Road which began development in 2002 under LucasArts. Purcell provided Michael Stemmle's development team with concept art and assisted in the creation of the game's plot. Despite its smoothly proceeding development, LucasArts abruptly canceled the project in March 2004. Purcell was unable to understand why development halted; he described himself as "frustrated and disappointed" at the decision.

In 2005, LucasArts' license with Purcell which gave them the right to produce games based on the Sam & Max franchise expired. That allowed Purcell to take the franchise to Telltale Games in San Rafael, California, a new company formed by members of Stemmle's development team. A new episodic series of Sam & Max games, Sam & Max Save the World, was announced. Purcell's work on the new game series encompassed design and writing, as well as the design of the game's cover art; despite his work, Purcell described it as "minimal" due to the effectiveness of the team. At the same time, he began a Sam & Max webcomic hosted on the Telltale Games website. The webcomic ran for twelve issues, and it earned him an Eisner Award for "Best Digital Comic" when the comic finished its run in 2007. Purcell assisted with design and writing when Sam & Max Beyond Time and Space began development in 2007. Through Telltale Games, he released two sketchbooks of his Sam & Max work and a 20th anniversary edition of Sam & Max: Surfin' the Highway in 2008. He later painted the cover art for Telltale's Tales of Monkey Island.

Purcell's work at Pixar has included character design, such as the "Screamin' Banshee" from the short Mater and the Ghostlight.

At Pixar's story development department, Purcell contributed screenplay material and voice work for the 2006 film Cars, and designed the character of the Screamin' Banshee in the short Mater and the Ghostlight. Providing scripts and voice work for three games based on Cars, Purcell became involved with THQ's video game adaptations of Pixar films. Purcell was credited for involvement with Pixar's 2007 film Ratatouille; he provided the voice for the character of Carl in George & A.J.—a 2009 short based on the film Up. Purcell co-directed Pixar's 2012 film Brave alongside Brenda Chapman and Mark Andrews in addition to providing work for the screenplay; Brave constituted Purcell's biggest role in a Pixar project to date.

In 2014, Purcell wrote and directed the Pixar Christmas special Toy Story That Time Forgot which aired on ABC on December 2, 2014. Purcell was not considering the possibility of Pixar adapting Sam & Max into a film, as the characters' moral ambiguity is inconsistent with traditional Pixar stories. In 2023, Purcell was among 75 Pixar employees laid off by The Walt Disney Company as part of an ongoing company-wide restructuring.

== Personal life ==
Purcell grew up in California and lives there. He has a younger brother, David. In a 2000 interview, Purcell said that he had been drawing all his life, and that he still has drawings he made when he was three years old. Noting that his line of creative work depends entirely on things one learns, Purcell describes himself as an "average" student at school, but wishing that he had tried harder at some classes. After studying film-making courses at junior college, Purcell enrolled in the California College of the Arts to study fine art; he received a bachelor's degree in fine arts there. He befriended Mike Mignola and later Art Adams while at the college. Citing the Marx Brothers, Peter Sellers, and Monty Python as among his interests, he says that he is inspired by "creative people who have made their seemingly most self-indulgent artistic whims into a career". During the development of Sam & Max Hit the Road in 1993, Purcell married fellow lead designer Collette Michaud. They have two sons.

The characters of Sam and Max were created in Purcell's youth; his brother Dave originally came up with several comics around the idea of a dog and rabbit detective duo. Dave would often leave unfinished comics around the house. Deliberately making the characters mix up each other's names, shoot at each other and mock the way in which they had been drawn, Steve, in a case of sibling rivalry, would sometimes finish the stories in parodies of their original form. That developed from Steve mocking his brother to the creation of his own stories with the characters.

In the late 1970s, Dave Purcell gave Steve the rights to the characters; he signed them over in a contract on Steve's birthday and allowed him to develop the characters in his own way. Purcell believes that his younger brother has recovered and forgiven him from their earlier years. Having kept one as a pet in his youth, Purcell has an interest in rats, which are commonly featured in his artistic work.

== Credited works ==
=== Films ===
Year	Title	Director	Writer	Story Artist	Other	Voice	Notes
2006	Cars	No	No	Yes	Yes	Tractors	Additional Screenplay Material
2007	Ratatouille	No	No	No	Yes		Pixar Productions
2012	Brave	Co-Director	Screenplay	No	Yes	The Crow	Song Lyricist: "Song of Mor'du"
2017	Coco	No	No	No	Yes		Pixar Senior Creative Team
2018	Incredibles 2	No	No	No	Yes		Pixar Senior Creative Team
2019	Toy Story 4	No	No	No	Yes	The Dummies	Pixar Senior Creative Team
2022	Turning Red	No	No	No	Yes		Pixar Senior Creative Team
2022	Lightyear	No	No	No	Yes		Pixar Senior Creative Team
2023	Elemental	No	No	No	Yes		Pixar Senior Creative Team
2024	Inside Out 2	No	No	No	Yes	Deep Dark Secret	
2026	Hoppers	No	No	No	Yes	Amphibian King	

=== Shorts ===
Year	Title	Director	Writer	Story Artist	Other	Voice	Notes
2006	Mater and the Ghostlight	No	No	No	Yes	Screamin' Banshee	Additional Character Designer
2009	George and A.J.	No	No	No	Yes	Carl	
2009–10	Cars Toons: Mater's Tall Tales	No	No	No	Yes	Additional Voices	Episodes 5–9
2012	The Legend of Mor'du	No	Yes	No	Yes	The Crow	
2013–14	Cars Toons: Tales from Radiator Springs	No	No	No	Yes	Additional Voices/Sandy Dunes	Episodes 3–4
2015	Borrowed Time	No	No	No	Yes	Additional Voices	
2022	Cars on the Road	Yes	Yes	Yes	Yes	Randy/Wraith Rod	Disney+ Original short films, directed Episodes 1, 2, and 8, Pixar Senior Creative Team

=== Television ===
Year	Title	Director	Writer	Other	Voice	Notes
1988	The Completely Mental Misadventures of Ed Grimley	No	No	Yes		Production crew
1997–98	The Adventures of Sam & Max: Freelance Police	No	Yes	Yes		Writing and design
2014	Toy Story That Time Forgot	Yes	Yes	Yes	The Cleric	TV special
2025	Win or Lose	No	No	Yes		Pixar Senior Creative Team

=== Bibliography ===
- Amazing High Adventure (1984) – cover artwork
- Different Worlds #33, #35, #36 and #37 (1984) – cover artwork
- New Mutants #43 (1986) – pencils
- Fish Police #6 (1987) – pencils
- Fish Police #7 (1987) – pencils, inks and letters
- Fish Police #9 (1987) – pencils and inks
- Alpha Flight #47 (1987) – pencils
- Sam & Max: Freelance Police special edition (1987)
- Critters #19: Sam & Max in "Night of the Cringing Wildebeest" (1987)
- Tournament of Dreams (1987) – cover artwork
- RuneQuest (1987–88) – cover artwork
- Gumby's Winter Fun Special (1988) – writing
- GrimJack #52: Sam & Max in "Fair Wind to Java" (1988)
- Sam & Max: Freelance Police special (1989)
- Critters #50: Sam & Max in "The Damned Don't Dance" (1990)
- Marvel Comics Presents #41: "Wolverine" (1990) – pencils and inks
- Sam & Max: Freelance Police: "Bad Day on the Moon" (1992)
- Sam & Max: Freelance Police special color edition (1992)
- Fast Forward #3 (1992) – pencils, inks and color
- Defenders of Dynatron City (1992)
- The Collected Sam & Max: Surfin' The Highway (1995)
- Dark Horse Presents #107: "Rusty Razorclam, President of Neptune" (1996) – writing
- Hellboy Christmas Special (1997) – writing, pencils, ink and color
- Wizard: Sam & Max in "Belly of the Beast" (1997)
- Oni Double Feature #10: Sam & Max in "Skeptical Investigators" (1998)
- Totally Fox Kids Magazine #10: Sam & Max in "Something's Not Right Here" (1998)
- Totally Fox Kids Magazine #31: Sam & Max in "Action Figure Surgery" (1998)
- Batman Villains Secret Files and Origins #1: "If A Man Be Clay!" (2005)
- Sam & Max: The Big Sleep (2005–2007)
- The Age of S&M (2006)
- The Effigy Mound (2007)
- Sam & Max: Surfin' The Highway anniversary edition (2008)
- Brave: One Perfect Day (2012)

=== Video games ===
Year	Title	Role	Developer
1987	Maniac Mansion	Artwork	Lucasfilm Games
1988	Zak McKracken and the Alien Mindbenders	Artwork	Lucasfilm Games
1989	Their Finest Hour	Testing	Lucasfilm Games
1989	Pipe Dream	Artwork	The Assembly Line
1989	Indiana Jones and the Last Crusade: The Graphic Adventure	Animation, artwork and whip research	Lucasfilm Games
1990	Loom	Animation, graphics and artwork	Lucasfilm Games
1990	The Secret of Monkey Island	Graphics and artwork	Lucasfilm Games
1991	Monkey Island 2: LeChuck's Revenge	Animation, graphics and artwork	LucasArts
1991	ToeJam & Earl	Original concept art character Designs	Johnson Voorsanger Productions
1993	Zombies Ate My Neighbors	Artwork	LucasArts
1993	ToeJam & Earl in Panic on Funkotron	Original concept art Character Designs	Johnson Voorsanger Productions
1993	Sam & Max Hit the Road	Design, graphics and artwork	LucasArts
1994	The Horde	Artwork	Toys For Bob
1996	Mortimer and the Riddles of the Medallion	Artwork	LucasArts
1997	Herc's Adventures	Artwork	LucasArts; Big Ape Productions
1997	The Curse of Monkey Island	Artwork	LucasArts
2006	Cars	Writing and additional voices	Various
2006	Cars: Radiator Springs Adventures	Writing and additional voices	AWE Games
2007	Cars Mater-National Championship	Writing and additional voices	Various
2006–2007	Sam & Max Save the World	Writing and design	Telltale Games
2007–2008	Sam & Max Beyond Time and Space	Writing and design	Telltale Games
2009	Tales of Monkey Island	Artwork	Telltale Games
2010	Sam & Max: The Devil's Playhouse	Artwork	Telltale Games
2020	Sam & Max: This Time It's Virtual	Writing, design and the voice of Duncan Dills	HappyGiant
