= Katherine Sarafian =

Armenian-American film producer (born 1969)

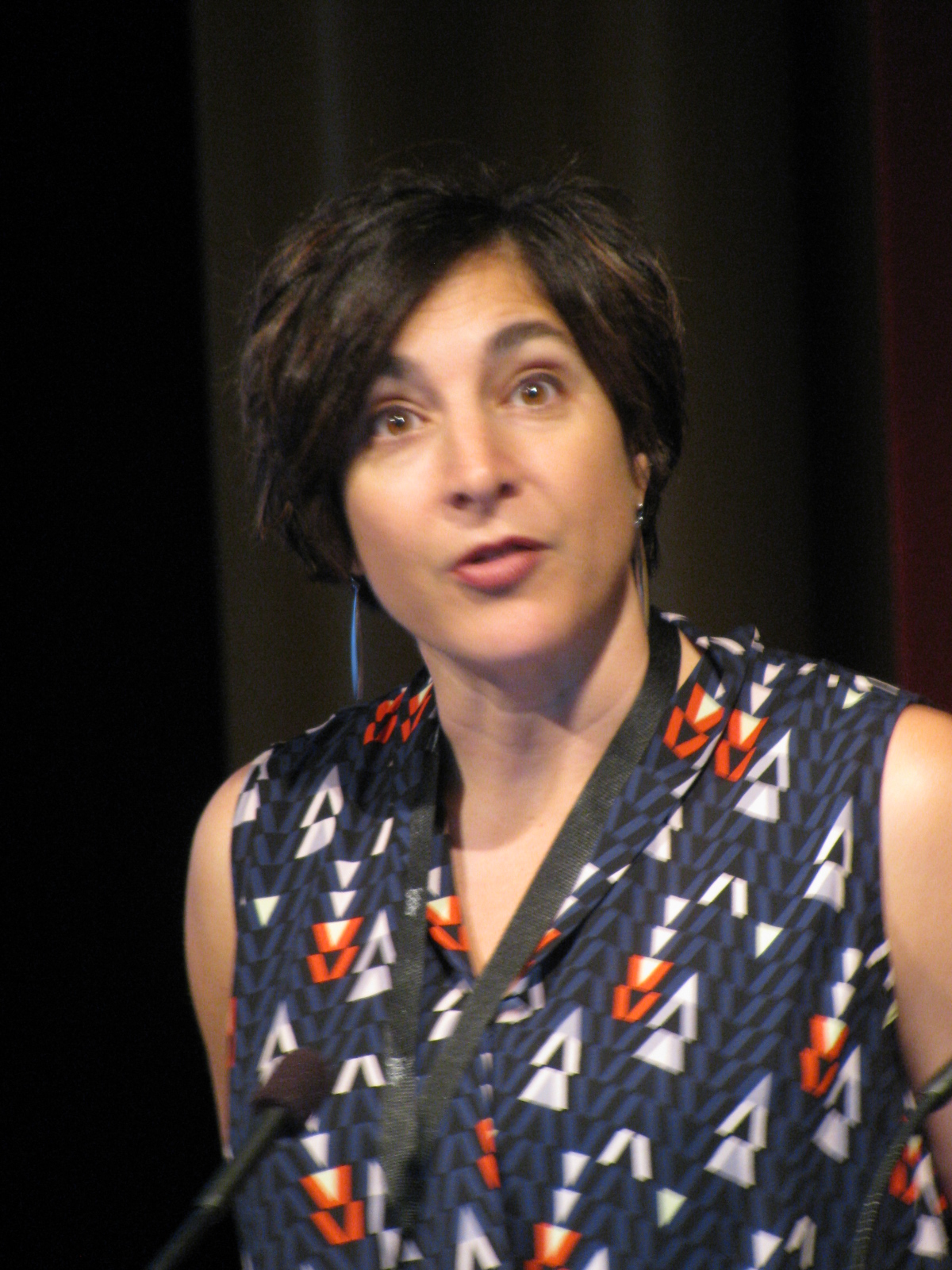
- Born: January 27, 1969 (age 57); San Leandro, California, U.S.
- Occupation: Film producer

Katherine Marianne Sarafian (Armenian: Քեթրին Սարաֆյան; born January 27, 1969) is an Armenian-American film producer. She started at Pixar Animation Studios as an artist but was shifted from the art department to marketing during the making of A Bug's Life by Pixar head Steve Jobs. She then became a producer within Pixar.

== Early life ==
Katherine Sarafian, the middle of three children, was raised in San Leandro, California, by her Armenian mother Alice, Izmirian, who as active in San Leandro civic affairs, and Armenian father Richard Sarafian Jr., a pastor of the Saint Vartan Armenian Church of Oakland who died in 2009. Sarafian's Armenian heritage and religious upbringing, because her father is a pastor, have been a central influence.

Sarafian interned with the Armenian Assembly of America in 1991, which led to an internship at a video production company in Washington, D.C.

== Career ==
Sarafian produced Pixar's 2006 short film Lifted and its 2012 theatrical release Brave, for which she was nominated for the Producer's Guild Award for Outstanding Producer of an Animated Theatrical Motion Picture.

== Personal life ==
Katherine Marianne Sarafian lives in nearby Oakland with her husband, visual effects specialist Meher Gourjian, whose production credits include work in Harry Potter and whom she married during her six years of producing Brave. She gave birth to two sons during the six years of production time.

Sarafian is an advocate for Armenian causes, and serves on the advisory board for TUMO Center for Creative Technologies.

== Producer filmography ==
- The Incredibles (2004) (assistant producer)
- Lifted (2006) (producer)
- Brave (2012) (producer)
- Toy Story 4 (2019) (development producer)
- Cars on the Road (2022) (executive producer)
- Self (2024) (executive producer)

== Accolades ==
In 2013, for her work on Brave, she was nominated for "Outstanding Producer of Animated Theatrical Motion Pictures" at the 24th Producers Guild of America Awards and for "Outstanding Visual Effects in an Animated Feature" at the 11th Visual Effects Society Awards, which she won.
