= Gustavo Santaolalla =

Argentine musician (born 1951)

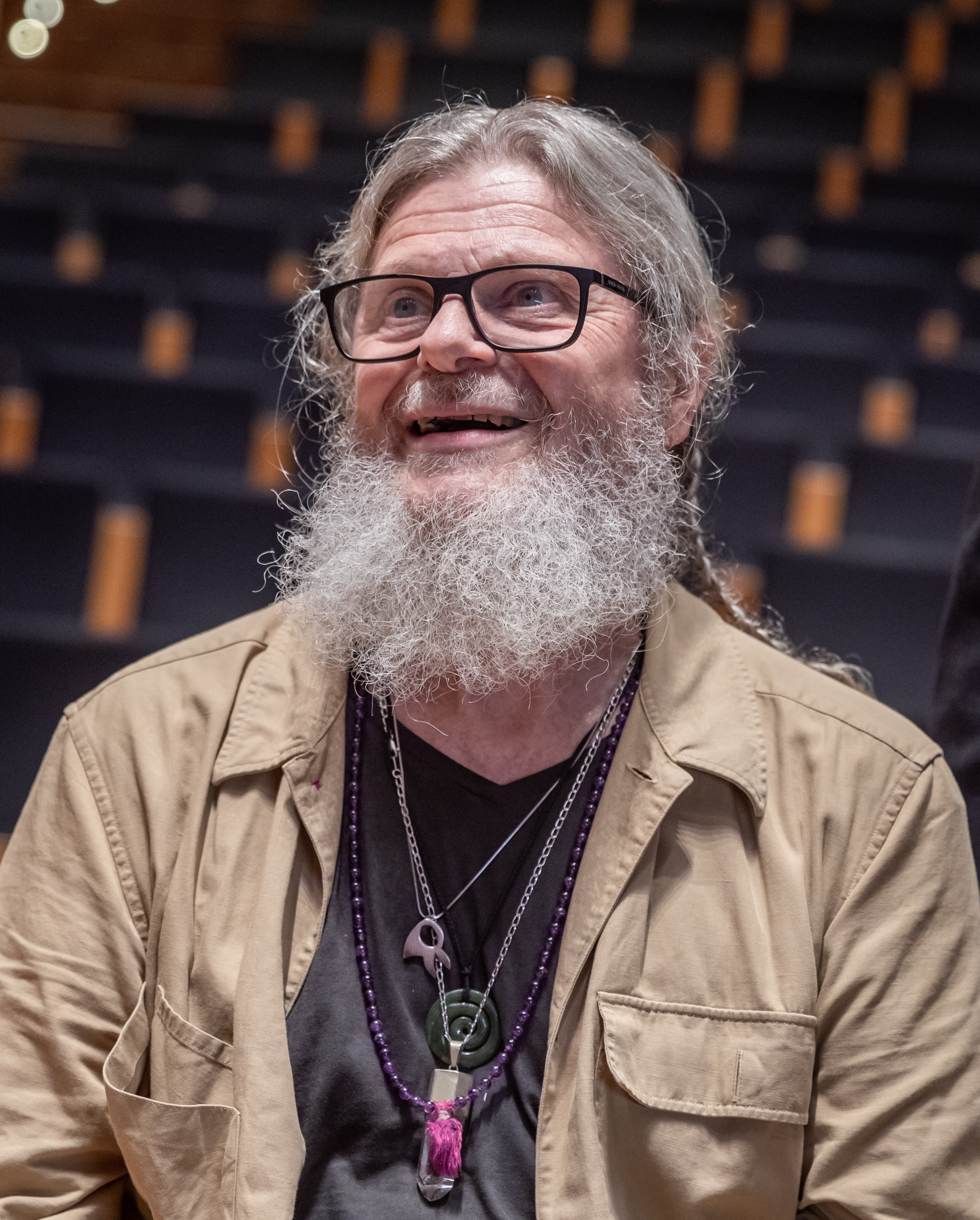
- Santaolalla in 2022

Background information
- Born: Gustavo Alfredo Santaolalla; 19 August 1951 (age 75); El Palomar, Argentina
- Origin: Buenos Aires, Argentina
- Genres: Latin rock; neotango; experimental; film score
- Occupations: Composer; music producer; musician; multi-instrumentalist; winemaker
- Instruments: Vocals; ronroco; guitar; bass; banjo; piano; organ; percussion
- Years active: 1967–present
- Member of: Bajofondo
- Formerly of: Arco Iris

Gustavo Alfredo Santaolalla (Spanish: [ɡusˈtaβo alˈfɾeðo santaoˈlaʝa]; born 19 August 1951) is an Argentine composer, record producer and musician. He is the recipient of numerous accolades for his works, including two Academy Awards for Best Original Score, a Golden Globe, two Grammy Awards and 17 Latin Grammy Awards. He is known for his minimalist approach to composing and for his influence in the Latin rock music genre.

Involved in music from a young age, he began a professional career in 1967 founding the band Arco Iris, who were influential to the rock nacional genre. Fleeing the rule of the Argentine military junta and the dictatorship of the National Reorganization Process, Santaolalla moved to Los Angeles in 1978. After returning to Argentina in the 1980s and taking a musical sabbatical, he became a leading figure in the rock en español movement, establishing the record label Surco Records within Universal Music and producing records for over 100 artists. Notable records he produced were several from Café Tacuba, including their acclaimed 1994 album Re, Julieta Venegas's 2000 album Bueninvento, and Juanes's 2005 hit single "La Camisa Negra". Santaolalla established the neotango group Bajofondo in 2001.

Music from Santaolalla's 1998 solo album Ronroco caught the attention of filmmakers and led to a career expansion into film scores, beginning with Amores perros (2000), 21 Grams (2003) and The Motorcycle Diaries (2004). Santaolalla rose to fame for creating the scores for Brokeback Mountain (2005) and Babel (2006), for which he received two Academy Awards for Best Original Score in consecutive years. He scored I Come with the Rain (2009) and Biutiful (2010). Santaolalla further gained recognition for his work on The Last of Us game series, composing the 2013 game and its 2020 sequel. In 2014, he composed his first animated film, The Book of Life, and his first Argentine film, Wild Tales. He scored the short film Borrowed Time (2015) and co-composed the documentary Before the Flood (2016). Santaolalla returned to adapt his music for the 2023 The Last of Us TV series and composed an original score for October 2024 showings of the 1931 Spanish-language Dracula film by the Los Angeles Opera.

Not learned in reading or writing musical notation, Santaolalla prefers composing his scores mostly by himself. Favouring instruments like the ronroco, he adopts a minimalistic approach when composing and prefers to capture humanistic elements of performances. He compares his philosophy of favouring minimalism in music to parkour, comparing the calculations of athletes before landing to his measured selection of musical notes before playing them. By contrast, his live performances have been noted for their vibrancy. For his influence in Latin music, Santaolalla was recognized as a BMI Icon during the 15th annual Latin Awards Ceremony in 2008 and received the Latin Grammy Trustees Award in 2023. In his personal life, he has two children with his wife, and is engaged with winemaking.

== Early life ==
Gustavo Alfredo Santaolalla was born in El Palomar, Argentina on 19 August 1951. Santaolalla was born to a stay-at-home mother and a father working in the advertising industry for J. Walter Thompson. His family has roots in Spain; his grandfather was Andalusian and his grandmother was Basque. When Santaolalla was five, he was given his first guitar by his grandmother for his birthday; he "immediately connected in a sort of a spiritual level with the music", and began musical tutelage with a hired teacher. When he was ten, his teacher declined to continue attempting to educate him; according to Santaolalla, the teacher told his mother "his ear is stronger than my music". Santaolalla had also lived in the community of Ciudad Jardín Lomas del Palomar. Santaolalla's family would buy him instruments and support his musical activities, though they initially did not believe this was a viable profession for him; Santaolalla said that this attitude was only brief, with his relatives quickly supporting his music as a serious endeavor for him.

In his pre-teenage years, Santaolalla wrote songs in English which "mimic[ked]" the music of bands like the Beatles; at twelve, he was gifted his first electric guitar. In his teenage years, Santaolalla had aspired to become a musician such that he designed a logo for a record label he had dreamed of owning. Santaolalla had been an altar boy at a Catholic church, aspiring to join the seminary, but had a falling out with his dedication to religion after pondering why God would let evil and Hell exist despite His goodness. The priest had called Santaolalla's father regarding performing an exorcism on the boy for his "heresy", but Santaolalla's father supported his exit from the church. By 1966, Santaolalla, then 15, had been arrested by the military juntas governing Argentina, according to him because he had long hair and played an electric guitar, despite not partaking in drugs or being involved in political activities. The first time Santaolalla was arrested, his father arrived to collect him, questioning the authorities about what crime Santaolalla had committed. The arrests continued throughout his adolescence.

== Career ==
=== 1967–2001: Early career and bands ===
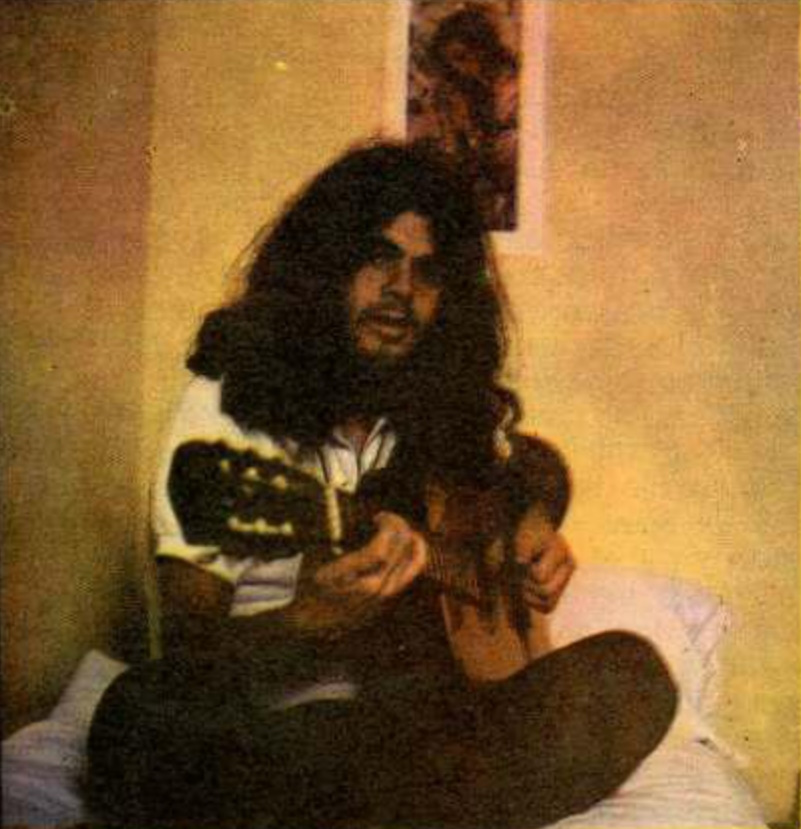
Santaolalla in 1971

Santaolalla's music career began in 1967 when he co-founded the group Arco Iris, a rock band that helped create rock nacional. He played guitar and sang in the band, which included wind instrument player Ara Tokatlian, bass player Guillermo Bordarampé, percussionist Horacio Gianello and their vocalist Danais Winnycka, who became their spiritual guide. The group lived a communal lifestyle, practicing celibacy, vegetarianism, forgoeing alcohol and drugs, and were engaged with Eastern religion. The band rose to prominence with the song "Mañana campestre" from their third album Tiempo de Resurrección.

After seven Arco Iris albums, Santaolalla left following a disagreement with Tokatlian, and amid concerns that arose with Santaolalla halfway through their existence that "any group that is so inner directed runs the risk of turning into a cult". Santaolalla called his mother, who orchestrated an operation to "rescue" him from the community he had found to be "oppressive". Santaolalla thereafter founded the hard rock group Soluna. With the 1976 Argentine coup d'état, Santaolalla experienced hard times under the National Reorganization Process and moved to Los Angeles, California in 1978, living undocumented for several years. He formed the group Wet Picnic, but had no commercial success with them. At this point, Santaolalla described his life as "[Eight years of eating shit every morning]", and lived a "[fantasy]" of a drug-abusing rock star. Afterwards he lived in a hotel in New York, experiencing poverty with his creative partner Aníbal Kerpel.

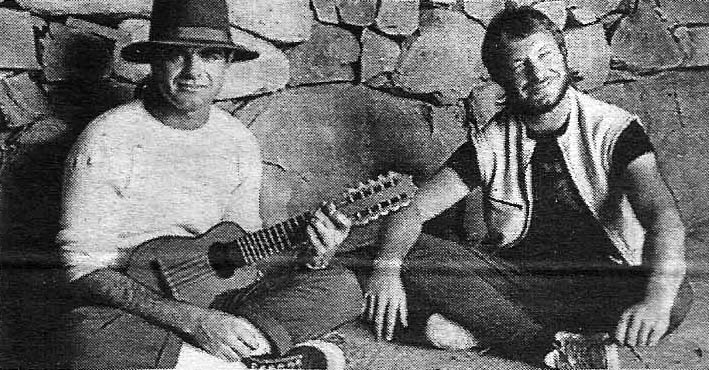
Santaolalla (left) with León Gieco (right) in 1985

In the 1980s, Santaolalla was able to return to Argentina and on one trip he began travelling the rural country with his friend, the folk musician León Gieco. This venture was called "De Ushuaia a la Quiaca", respectively referring to the southernmost and northernmost towns in Argentina, Ushuaia and La Quiaca. From 1981 to 1985, in four years, he and Gieco travelled to document and experience folk music, aiming to "look for the essence of" where the music of Argentina's past came from. Gieco had originally wanted to invite musicians from across the country to Buenos Aires, but Santaolalla wanted them to visit the musicians where they lived. 450 concerts were performed during this journey. Santaolalla's embrace of the musicians' musical styles caused them to become prevalent in his work, namely the ten-string Andean instrument called the ronroco. It was at this point Santaolalla began a relationship with his future wife Alejandra, who the musicians hired as a photographer to document the trip alongside the direction of the musical guide Leda Valladares.

Santaolalla released the album Santaolalla in 1982, and became a leading figure of the Mexico-based rock en español movement; the Los Angeles Times described his contribution to Latin rock music as becoming "the most transcendent producer" in its history, and Billboard wrote he is considered one of the creators of Latin alternative music who helped develop it to "[global acclaim]". Santaolalla began establishing himself as a record producer upon his return to Buenos Aires in the 80s, with the music executive Jesús López helping him establish Surco Records within Universal Music. Santaolalla collaborated with co-producer Aníbal Kerpel on albums for numerous artists, including Café Tacuba, Maldita Vecindad, Julieta Venegas, Molotov and Juanes, and other Argentine artists like Divididos and Bersuit Vergarabat; Santaolalla produced over 100 albums at that point in time, for artists he described as being on a "[search for their identity through music]". Santaolalla says the records he produced consisted largely of debut albums for artists, and felt that his impact helped put them "[on the map]".

Santaolalla produced Café Tacuba's 1992 debut album, and their 1994 album Re—considered among the greatest Latin albums. In 1995 Santaolalla released the album GAS, and in 1998, he released the album Ronroco, consisting of solo works recorded over 14 years, and featuring the titular instrument alongside the charango and the Andean pan flute. He also produced Juana Molina's 1996 debut studio album Rara, as well as Julieta Venegas's praised 2000 album Bueninvento. Santolalla formed the neotango group Bajofondo in 2001, for whom he plays guitar. Billboard credited this group with modernizing tango with electronic, modern elements.

=== 2000–2013: Rise to fame with film scores ===
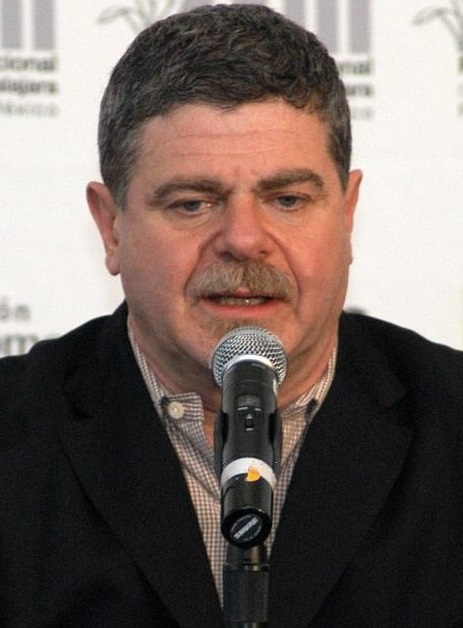
Santaolalla in 2008

The attention that Santaolalla's record Ronroco attained led to a career expansion into composing film scores. American director Michael Mann first used Santaolalla's song "Iguazu" in his film The Insider (1999). Mexican director Alejandro González Iñárritu heard Ronroco, leading him to ask Santaolalla to compose his films Amores perros (2000) and 21 Grams (2003), creating a recurring collaboration between the two. Before directing his debut Amores perros Iñárritu was a radio DJ, and Santaolalla—being busy—initially turned down the offer from the novice. Santaolalla says he woke up in the middle of one night and considered, "suppose this guy is a genius, and this film is amazing", and corresponded with Iñárritu, and was convinced to work on the film. Of his transition into scores, Santaolalla said he had "no plan, no master plan. But I always had this love for films". Santaolalla produced Café Tacuba's 2003 album Cuatro Caminos. Iñárritu introduced Santaolalla to Walter Salles, and Santaolalla composed the score for Salles's biographical film The Motorcycle Diaries (2004), for which he won the Anthony Asquith Award for Film Music at the 58th British Academy Film Awards.

Santaolalla produced Juanes's album Mi Sangre (2004), from which the 2005 single "La Camisa Negra" topped Hot Latin Songs chart for eight weeks. Santaolalla wrote the score for Niki Caro's drama film North Country (2005). Santaolalla organized the Café de Los Maestros project, which included a concert, a documentary film, a book, and a double album. That year, Santaolalla provided the instrumental music for the soundtrack to the Contemporary Western romance film Brokeback Mountain. Director Ang Lee sought a sparse and "yearning" sound for the film and sent Santaolalla a script. Two weeks later, he received a CD of new compositions for the film—unaware that Santaolalla composed music during early pre-production for films, he mistook this for reference music. According to Santaolalla, he composed 100% of the score before principal photography began. From Brokeback Mountain, Santaolalla composed the song "A Love That Will Never Grow Old", which won the 2006 Golden Globe Award for Best Original Song. Santaolalla composed the score to the 2006 psychological drama film Babel, another collaboration with Iñárritu.

Santaolalla's reception of the Academy Award for Best Original Score for Brokeback Mountain in 2006 and for Babel in 2007 established him as a prominent composer of Hollywood films. He was the co-producer of Calle 13's song "Tango del Pecado", a song from their album Residente o Visitante (2007). On 12 June 2008, Santaolalla was recognized as a BMI Icon during the 15th annual Latin Awards Ceremony. He composed Tran Anh Hung's neo-noir thriller I Come with the Rain (2009), and collaborated again with Iñárritu on the music for the film Biutiful (2010).

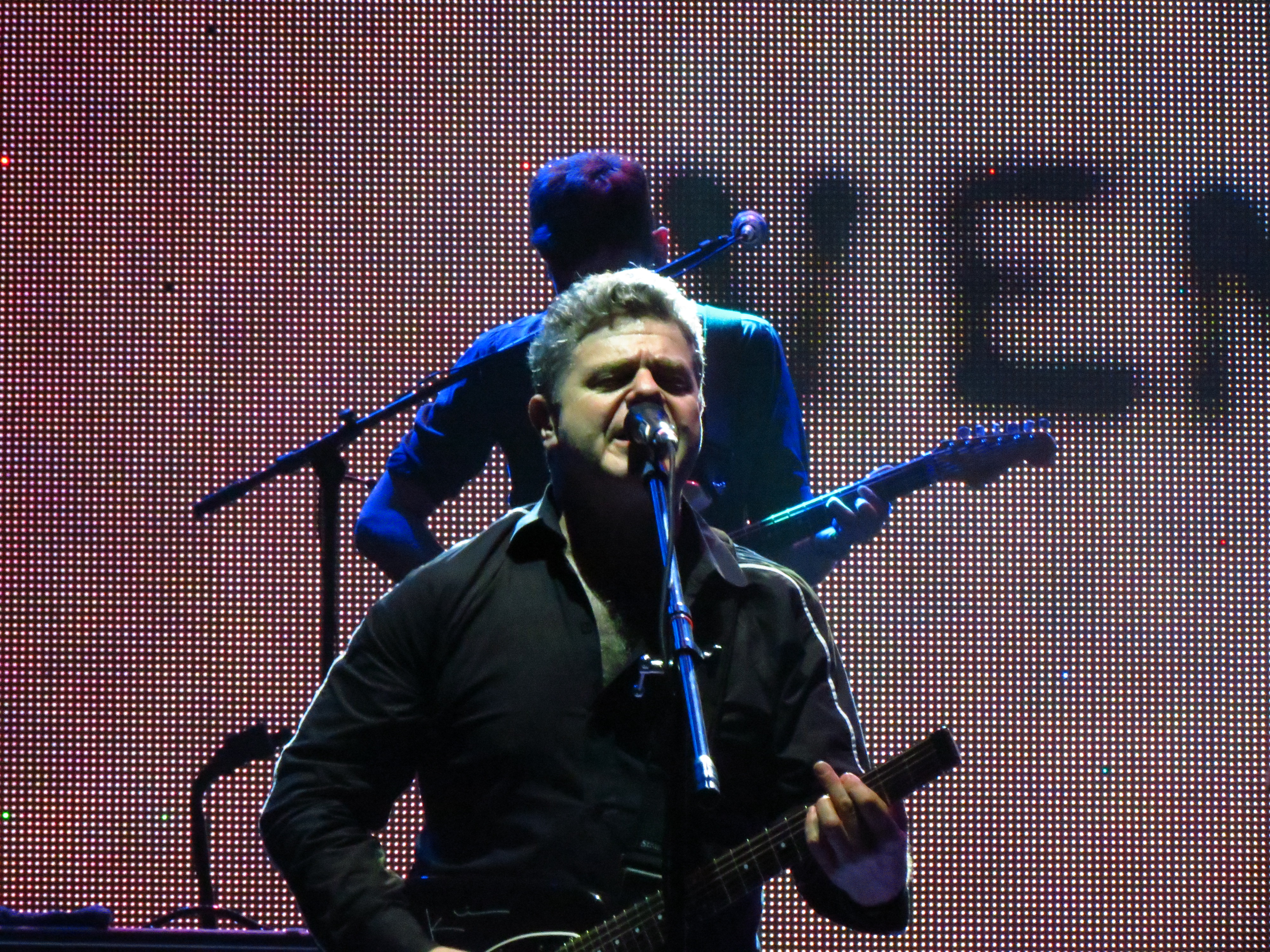
Santaolalla performing with Bajofondo in 2013

Santaolalla composed the score for the 2013 video game The Last of Us, marking his first composition for a video game. During the development of the game at studio Naughty Dog, creative director Neil Druckmann and game director Bruce Straley compiled musical tracks that they found inspirational. When searching for a composer to work on the game's music, they realised Santaolalla composed many of their compiled tracks; they asked Sony to reach out to him. He was brought to the studio and shown an early version of the first trailer and a full description of the plot; Druckmann remembers the composer's first words to them were "I want to be a part of this. Whatever it takes, I want to write for this". Santaolalla had previously wanted to compose for video games and was approached by several other developers following his Academy Award wins, but he refused to work on projects without a focus on story and characters. Santaolalla sent Druckmann "batches of themes and music" for nearly three years; to challenge himself, he used a variety of unique instruments that were new to him, giving "an element of danger and innocence".

Santaolalla composed the score to August: Osage County (2013). In November, Santaolalla toured in Mexico with Bajofondo in support of the album Presente, at the 11th Festival de las Almas in Valle de Bravo, at El Plaza Condesa and 19th Festival de Calaveras in Aguascalientes. At the 14th Annual Latin Grammy Awards, as part of Bajofondo, Santaolalla received the award for Best Instrumental Album for Presente and the song "Pena en mi Corazón" won Best Alternative Song.

=== 2014–2020: Continued work with scores and The Last of Us Part II ===
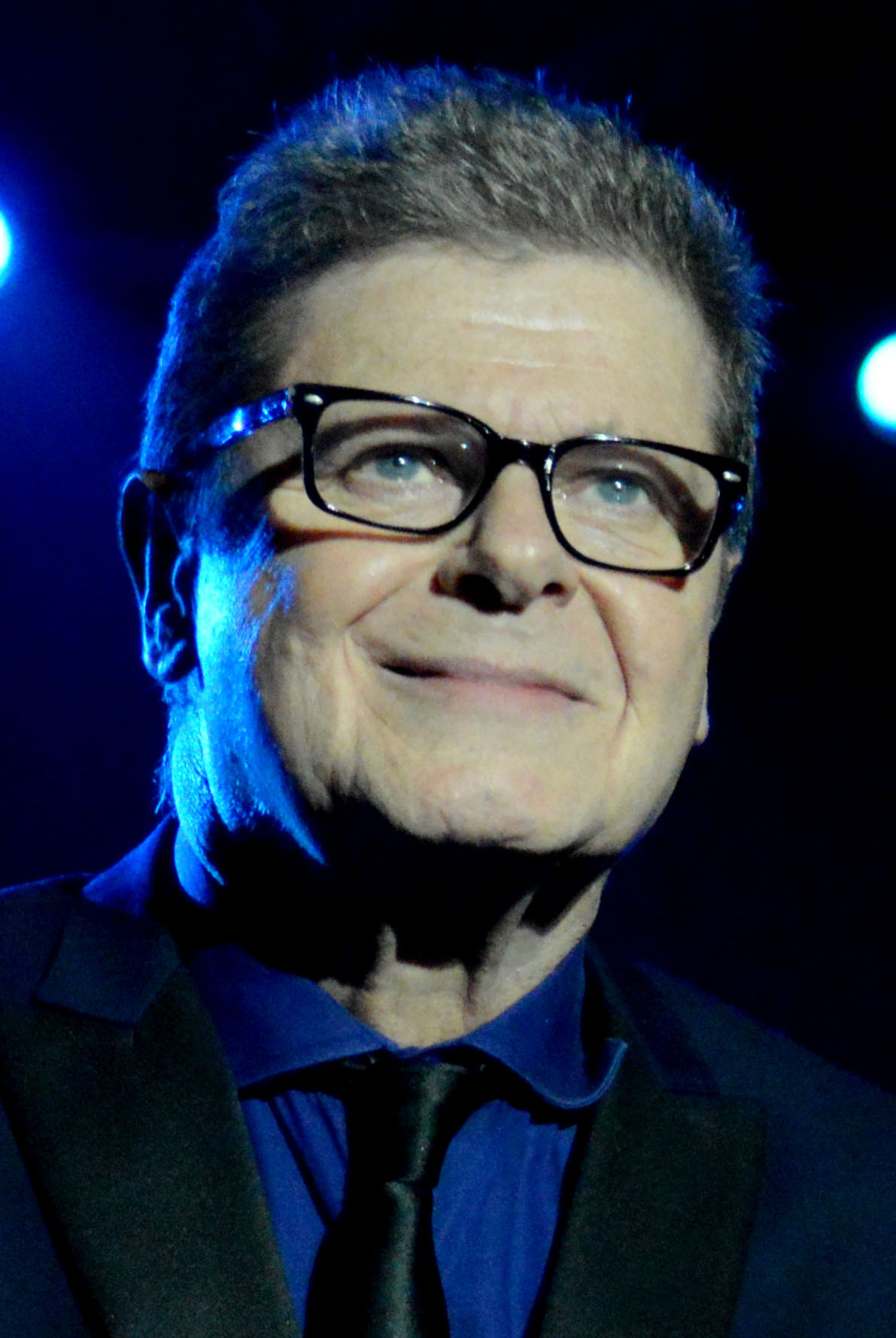
Santaolalla in 2017

Santaolalla composed the music to the musical Arrabal, written by John Weidman and directed by Sergio Trujillo, which opened at the Panasonic Theatre in February 2014. He composed the score to the 2014 film The Book of Life, his first animated film and the first time he worked with a large orchestra and choir. Santaolalla used the marimba and accordion, with mariachi horns in the score, which he saw as a change from his usual minimalist style. Santaolalla wrote songs with Paul Williams for the film; the two were already working on a musical adaptation of film director Guillermo del Toro's Pan's Labyrinth (2006). Stars Diego Luna and Zoe Saldaña sang on the soundtrack, with their Hispanic accents retained—Santaolalla said that this, the authentic instrumentation and the film's open depiction of life, death, and the underworld made The Book of Life "fantastic" and differentiated it from being watered down and tethered to Hollywood appeal. He composed the score to Wild Tales (2014), his first score to an Argentine film.

Santaolalla composed the score for the Western animated short film Borrowed Time (2015). Directors Andrew Coats and Lou Hamou-Lhadj had been playing The Last of Us during development and enjoyed his leverage of silence in the score—their producer reached out and Santaolalla agreed to work with them at his Los Angeles studio once he was sent an animatic of the film set to a temp track of his own prior work. In October 2015, Santaolalla was inducted into the Latin Songwriters Hall of Fame by Paul Williams, who serves as the president of ASCAP. Santaolalla co-composed the soundtrack to the 2016 documentary film Before the Flood with Trent Reznor, Atticus Ross and Mogwai. Santaolalla scored the French thriller film All That Divides Us (2017).

Santaolalla returned to compose the score for The Last of Us Part II (2020), as he had done for the first game, with Mac Quayle providing additional music. Naughty Dog tasked him to create emotional, character-based tracks and he worked on the game for two to three years. Santaolalla continued using the ronroco, the instrument used in the first game's theme, as he felt it enhanced main character Ellie's qualities through feminine sounds, while he introduced a banjo for new character Abby's theme. He composed Part II's score around the banjo and an electric guitar, feeling the increased characters and complexities demanded more timbre. Santaolalla worked with Gary Clark Jr. on the song "Valley of Last Resort", created for the documentary film Freak Power: The Ballot or the Bomb (2020). With lyrics written by Paul Williams, Clark and Santaolalla respectively play electric guitar and ronroco and perform vocals together.

=== 2023–present: The Last of Us TV series and other scores ===
Santaolalla returned to co-compose the score for the television adaptation of The Last of Us, which premiered in 2023. He felt the "relationship that [fans] have with the music of the game" made his return inevitable and noted the music was so integral to the narrative that its absence would be akin to excluding lead characters Joel or Ellie. Santaolalla primarily recrafted his previous work instead of creating new music, focusing on elements he found interesting. He said some of his pieces fit perfectly while others were trimmed and edited to fit the scenes. He treated the series as "an expansion" of the game and kept them tied to each other, not seeking to revise or correct previous work as he found it authentic. Santaolalla had around 185 cues for the series, associated with specific on-screen actions, like a character opening a door or entering a car. Santaolalla worked on the score with David Fleming, who selected specific instruments that paired appropriately with Santaolalla's work. Also in 2023, Santaolalla performed at Eric Clapton's Crossroads Guitar Festival in September and received the Latin Grammy Trustees Award in November.

On 26 January 2024, Nonesuch Records released a 25th anniversary reissue of Ronroco. Santaolalla composed an original score for the 25–27 October screenings of the 1931 Spanish-language Dracula film at the United Theater in Los Angeles, commissioned by the Los Angeles Opera. He was interested in combining the traditional scoring method with an experimental musical approach—he knew nothing of this Spanish-language adaptation beforehand and said its lack of music made it languid—he felt his score's contribution to the showing would complement the film's characterization. Having an orchestra conducted by the Opera's resident conductor Lina González-Granados, Santaolalla composed the music beyond the orchestral portion with synthesisers and samplers, which he said improved the subharmonics and gave the score "potency". Santaolalla said that he maintained a feeling of "innocence" with the project, not feeling intimidated by the task in order to have fun, as the score would retain the "same melancholy touch that is ever present in everything I do".

In 2025, Santaolalla returned to compose the score for The Last of Us season 2. In the season premiere, "Future Days", Santaolalla makes a cameo appearance playing in a scene with the band Crooked Still. Having wanted to visit the set during filming, series co-creator Craig Mazin recalled how in Part II, Santaolalla made a cameo playing the banjo, and thought naturally to extend this into the series by integrating him in the scene with the band. Despite not having played the band's songs before, Mazin said they spoke about the music for "about 40 seconds", and played through numerous takes of the scene; Mazin said Santaolalla "loved every minute of it. Never complained" even though he warned the musician that it would be the two "longest days" of his life.

== Artistry ==
Santaolalla does not know how to read or write musical notation. When he played music in his adolescence, he would have to make sure he memorised all of the pieces he created and practised them so he would not forget, as he did not write them down in notation; in his teenage years, his parents bought him a tape recorder, which he used to collect his pieces. When working with an orchestra, Santaolalla still uses this method to notate, recording his compositions so an orchestrator can translate them to paper. Santaolalla said that composing and performing his scores primarily by himself brings "character", feeling that orchestral-based work lacks "personality".

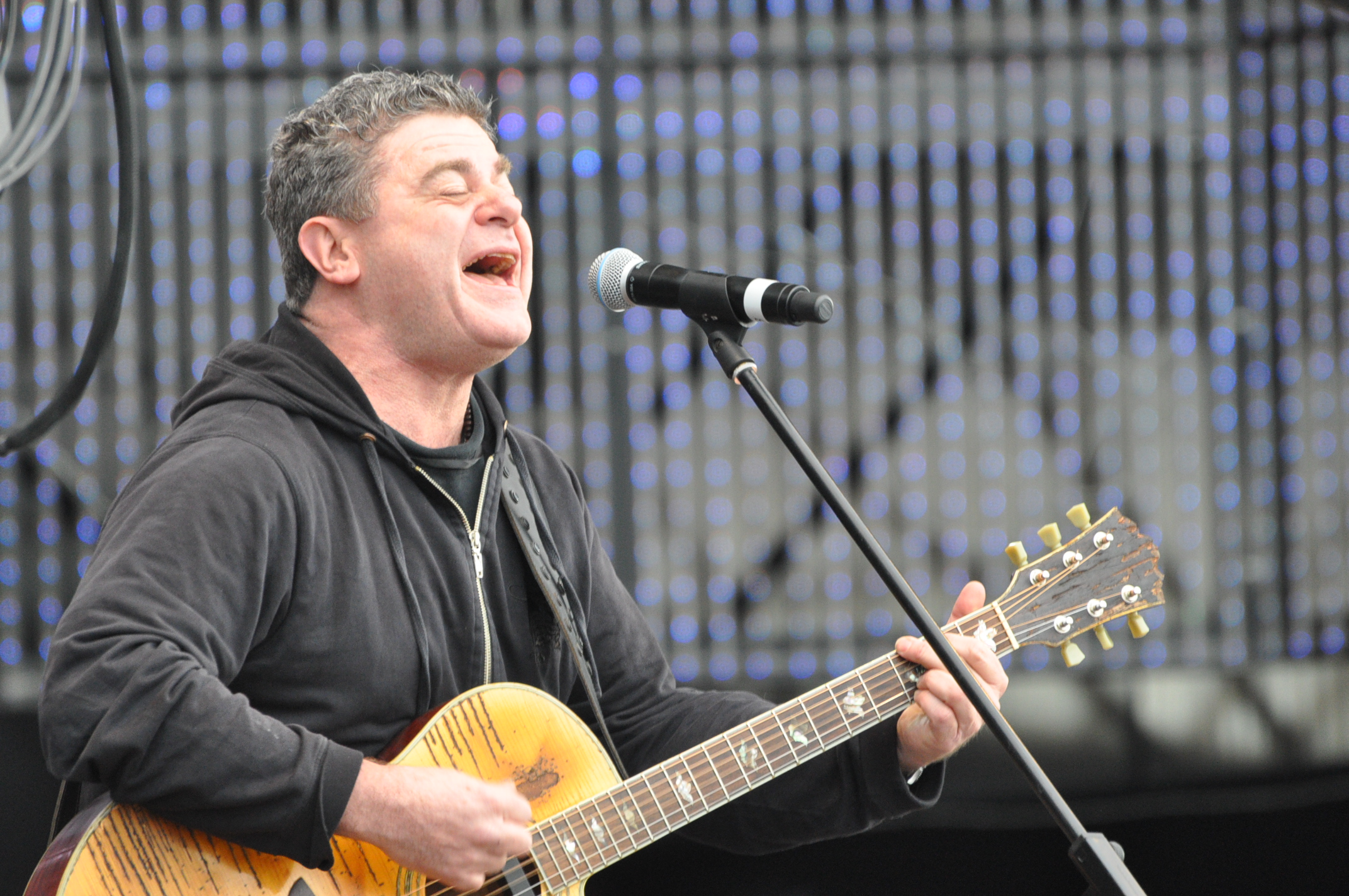
Santaolalla performing in 2010

Santaolalla typically begins composing music early in the production process of a film, according to the screenplay, something he says affords him a greater creative role. Santaolalla says this means he composes based on his relationship with the story and characters and from conversations with the principal creatives of the production, and he adapts his work from there. PBS describes his scores as "melancholy and minimal", and Santaolalla told the Los Angeles Times that melancholy was "ever present" in his work. By contrast, PBS describes the musician's live performances as "vivacious and buoyant"; PCGamesN described a 2024 performance of music at the London Royal Festival Hall as exciting and "beautifully moving", praising his vocals and professionalism.

Santaolalla favours the use of silence in his compositions; he says the sparsity "gives resonance to the notes that you play around it". Santaolalla compares his musical process to jumping in parkour, likening the calculations practiced before the athletes land to his measured selection of notes before he plays them. Santaolalla stated that "landing" the note is important, such that it is crucial to land "safe[ly]", closing the "arch". Santaolalla prefers to capture interactions with instruments when they are played, such as fingers sliding across guitar strings, when he records; he finds it "primitive", additive of "tension and texture" and conducive of "humanity", describing the practice as finding "the right note, hidden as a wrong note". Santaolalla's signature instrument is the ronroco, which he has used since discovering it during his time exploring the music of the Andes.

== Personal life ==
Gustavo Santaolalla is married to his wife Alejandra, with whom he has a daughter Luna, who holds a diploma in viticulture at the University of California Davis; and son Don Juan Nahuel. Santaolalla had been involved in winemaking since around the mid-2000s with Raúl Orozco and Juan Carlos Chavero, being the proprietor with Orozco of La Luna farm, a 22-hectare—ten of which are in cultivation—farm in Lunlunta, Luján de Cuyo, Argentina.

== Credits and accolades ==
Santaolalla is the recipient of numerous accolades, winning two Academy Awards for Best Original Score, being nominated for two Emmy Awards, winning a Golden Globe with two more nominations, winning two Grammy Awards with three more nominations, and winning 17 Latin Grammy Awards with 28 more nominations. Santaolalla was recognized as a BMI Icon during the 15th annual Latin Awards Ceremony in 2008, and for his influence in Latin music he received the 2023 Latin Grammy Trustees Award.
