= Hellboy Christmas Special =

Comic book horror anthology

- Cover by Gary Gianni

Publication information
- Publisher: Dark Horse Comics
- Format: One-shot
- Genre: Action/adventure, horror
- Publication date: December 3, 1997
- No. of issues: 1
- Main character: Hellboy

Creative team
- Written by: Mike Mignola; Gary Gianni; Steve Purcell
- Artists: Mike Mignola; Gary Gianni; Geof Darrow; Steve Purcell
- Letterers: Pat Brosseau; Lois Buhalis; Sean Konot
- Colorists: James Sinclair; Dave Stewart
- Editor: Scott Allie

Hellboy Christmas Special is a Dark Horse Comics one-shot comic book horror anthology edited by Scott Allie and featuring the work of Mike Mignola, Gary Gianni and Steve Purcell.

== Creation ==
Mignola has stated that when he and Gary Gianni came up with the idea for this Christmas special and that for his own entry for it he took a story based on an old folktale that he had long mooted and added a Christmas angel to it.

== Publication history ==
Hellboy Christmas Special (December 3, 1997) featured a cover by Gary Gianni.

Title	Creators
A Christmas Underground	by Mike Mignola
In the story Hellboy travels to England on Christmas Eve 1989 where he descends through a passage in a graveyard in search of the daughter of a dying woman who is married to a prince of the underworld.
Ernie’s Holiday Ditty	by Steve Purcell
This one page feature relates the lyrics to a horrific and satirical take on traditional Christmas carols from the fictional Little Ernie and the Citizens of Toybox Community Glee Club who appear in Toybox also in this special.
A Strange Story	by Gary Gianni
Corpus Monstrum creator Gianni relates how his case of writer’s block, that threatened to leave a blank page in this special, was overcome by a series synchronistic incidents that pointed to 1870, the year Charles Dickens died.
Christmas	by Geof Darrow
A double page Christmas themed pinup.
Toybox	by Steve Purcell
In the story Ernie and Suda take shelter on Christmas Eve in the home of an old lady who they discover devoured by spider larvae and while Suda sleeps Ernie does batlle with the giant spider who returns down the chimney with a surprise.
A Gift for the Wicked	by Gary Gianni
Hodgson, St. George and Benedict of Corpus Monstrum spend Christmas night in a forbidden chamber at the ancestral home of Baron Grodak in an attempt to lift the curse that has left him the last of his line.
Further Reading	by Mike Mignola
Hellboy creator Mignola lists some yuletide ghost stories including his all-time favourite story A Christmas Carol by Charles Dickens along with his two best movie adaptations of the story Alastair Sim in 1951 and George C. Scott in 1984.

== Awards ==
The special won two 1998 Eisner Awards;

- Best Writer/Artist: Drama for Mike Mignola.
- Best Anthology, edited by Scott Allie.
