= August: Osage County (soundtrack) =

2013 soundtrack albums

August: Osage County (Original Motion Picture Soundtrack)

Soundtrack album by various artists
- Released: December 31, 2013
- Length: 39:41
- Label: Columbia
- Producer: Richard Glasser

August: Osage County (Original Motion Picture Score)

Film score by Gustavo Santaolalla
- Released: December 31, 2013
- Genre: Film score
- Length: 24:26
- Label: Sony Classical
- Producer: Gustavo Santaolalla

Gustavo Santaolalla chronology
The Last of Us (2013)	August: Osage County (2013)	The Last of Us Volume 2 (2014)

August: Osage County is the 2013 American tragicomedy film directed by John Wells based on Tracy Letts' Pulitzer Prize-winning 2007 play of the same name. Two soundtracks were released on December 31, 2013: an original soundtrack featuring the songs heard in the film, by Columbia Records and Gustavo Santaolalla's score album was released by Sony Classical Records.

== Background ==
Initially, the film was set to be scored by Carter Burwell whose involvement was confirmed in May 2013. However, by that August, Gustavo Santaolalla was confirmed to replace Burwell. Wells noted that, Santaolalla understood the material from the beginning and featured very spare music, but "the music that's there is beautiful, evocative and emotional, and that's a testament to his work."

The soundtrack to the film featured themes composed by Adam Taylor and Aníbal Kerpel, along with songs performed by Bon Iver, Kings of Leon, Eric Clapton, Billy Squier, John Fullbright, JD & the Straight Shot. It was released by Columbia Records on December 31, 2013. Santaolalla's score was released digitally on the same date by Sony Classical Records.

== Reception ==
Andrew Le of Renowned for Sound wrote: "The soundtrack to August: Osage County is a stirring reflection of the themes of the film, as well as the rollercoaster of emotions undoubtedly experienced by its characters." Katy Vans of Blueprint wrote: "these are suitably moody, soaring and emotional (and often short) and my only gripe is the feeling that these should all have been grouped together at the beginning or end of the album as they throw off the pace." Thom Jurek of AllMusic wrote: "This is one of the most erratically sequenced soundtracks to appear in recent decades, but may resonate with the film's core audience."

Michael Philips of Chicago Tribune called it "a terrible, naggingly optimistic musical score". David Rooney of The Hollywood Reporter and Scott Foundas of Variety found it to be "melancholic" and "engaging". Dana Stevens of Slate called it "an inappropriately saccharine score". Suasn G. Cole of NOW Toronto wrote: "Swelling orchestral elements in Gustavo Santaolalla's score are clunky – there's enough going on without music hammering it home." Drew McWeeny of Uproxx wrote: "the spare score by Gustavo Santaolalla is good, but not my favorite thing he's done."

== Track listing ==
August: Osage County (Original Motion Picture Soundtrack) track listing
No.	Title	Artist	Length
1.	"Hinnom, TX"	Bon Iver	3:50
2.	"Last Mile Home"	Kings of Leon	4:34
3.	"Lay Down Sally"	Eric Clapton	3:48
4.	"Don't Let Go"	Adam Taylor	1:47
5.	"The Kiss"	Adam Taylor	2:20
6.	"The Stroke"	Billy Squier	3:39
7.	"Gawd Above"	John Fullbright	3:34
8.	"The Decision"	Adam Taylor	1:36
9.	"Forward"	Adam Taylor	1:04
10.	"Violet's Song"	JD & the Straight Shot	3:51
11.	"Can't Keep It Inside"	Benedict Cumberbatch	1:19
12.	"End Credits"	Aníbal Kerpel	4:55
13.	"And Then They're Here"	Anibal Kerpel	1:09
14.	"Barb Balcony/Street Beater (aka Sanford & Son Theme)"	Anibal Kerpel	2:15
Total length:			39:41

August: Osage County (Original Motion Picture Score) track listing
No.	Title	Length
1.	"August Osage County (Main Theme)"	0:47
2.	"The Fields"	2:01
3.	"Arrival"	1:51
4.	"Impermanence"	3:03
5.	"Riding"	1:04
6.	"Lost"	1:08
7.	"Running Free"	1:47
8.	"Morning"	1:34
9.	"Family Visits"	0:49
10.	"Diagnosis"	1:23
11.	"Back At The House"	0:37
12.	"Crossing The Line"	1:24
13.	"August Osage County (Complete)"	4:56
14.	"A New Beginning"	2:02
Total length:		24:26

== Personnel ==
Credits adapted from liner notes:

- Booklet editor and design – WLP Ltd
- Music coordinator – Libby Umstead
- Music editors – Clint Bennett, Del Spiva
- Executive producer – Dana Sano
- Music business and legal affairs – David Helfant
- Music clearance – Celeste Chada
- Sony classical licensing – Mark Cavell
- Soundtrack producer – Richard Glasser
- Product development – Isabelle Tulliez
