= All That Divides Us =

2017 film by Thierry Klifa

- Film poster
- French: Tout nous sépare
- Directed by: Thierry Klifa
- Written by: Cédric Anger; Thierry Klifa
- Produced by: Maxime Delauney; François Kraus; Romain Rousseau; Denis Pineau-Valencienne; Luc Hardy
- Starring: Catherine Deneuve; Diane Kruger; Nekfeu; Nicolas Duvauchelle
- Cinematography: Julien Hirsch
- Edited by: Thomas Marchand
- Music by: Gustavo Santaolalla
- Production companies: Les Films du Kiosque; Nolita Cinema
- Distributed by: Mars Distribution
- Release date: 8 November 2017
- Running time: 99 minutes
- Country: France
- Language: French
- Budget: $4 million
- Box office: $1.3 million

All That Divides Us (French: Tout nous sépare) is a 2017 French thriller directed by Thierry Klifa.

== Cast ==
- Catherine Deneuve as Louise Keller
- Diane Kruger as Julia Keller
- Nekfeu as Ben Torres
- Nicolas Duvauchelle as Rodolphe Calavera
- Sébastien Houbani as Karim
- Michaël Cohen as Olivier
- Olivier Loustau as Daniel
- Brigitte Sy as Ben's mother
- Julia Faure as Patricia
- Elisabeth Mazev as Régine
- Virgile Bramly as Stéphane
