= The Book of Life (soundtrack) =

2014 albums

The Book Of Life (Original Motion Picture Soundtrack)

Soundtrack album by various artists
- Released: September 26, 2014
- Recorded: July 2014
- Studios: Abbey Road Studios; AIR Studios
- Genres: Rock; dance; ethnic pop; ballad; rhythm and blues; mariachi
- Length: 37:43
- Label: Fox Music
- Producers: Gustavo Santaolalla; Paul Williams

The Book of Life (Original Motion Picture Score)

Film score by Gustavo Santaolalla
- Released: October 24, 2014
- Recorded: July 2014
- Studios: Abbey Road Studios; AIR Studios
- Genres: Symphony; ethnic; folk; rock; pop; mariachi; bolero
- Length: 49:01
- Label: Fox Music
- Producer: Gustavo Santaolalla

Gustavo Santaolalla chronology
August: Osage County (2014)	The Book of Life (2014)	Wild Tales (2014)

The Book of Life is a 2014 animated musical fantasy comedy film directed by Jorge R. Gutierrez, produced by 20th Century Fox Animation and DreamWorks Animation, and distributed by 20th Century Fox, featuring the voices of Diego Luna, Zoe Saldaña, and Channing Tatum with supporting roles by Christina Applegate, Ice Cube, Ron Perlman, and Kate del Castillo.

The film's original music is composed by Gustavo Santaolalla in his first animated film composition. The film featured several pop singles incorporated into the soundtrack, from artists including Café Tacuba, Rod Stewart, Mumford & Sons, Radiohead, Elvis Presley, Plácido Domingo. Besides, two original songs were written for the film, by songwriter Paul Williams. The recording of the musical score began by July 2014 at Abbey Road Studios and AIR Studios in London, England. Unlike his previous films, using guitar notes for the scores, (Note: Santaolalla scored for The Motorcycle Diaries (2004) and Brokeback Mountain (2005) using guitar notes.) Santaolalla adapted for traditional and ethnic instrumentation, by using mostly Mexican music instruments. The score consisted of various genres: symphony, ethnic, folklore, rock, pop and ballad.

The Book of Life (Original Motion Picture Soundtrack) featuring the pop songs, were released through September 26, 2014 through iTunes and digital streaming platforms, followed by a physical release on October 10. Santaolalla's score album was released separately as The Book of Life (Original Motion Picture Soundtrack) on October 24. The original release had 29 tracks, and the complete score album consisting of 60 tracks, were released as a part of For Your Consideration album for the award season, and did not have a general release. The score received positive critical response, praising Santaolalla's compositions, the Mexican music and the incorporated pop songs.

== Development ==
From the very beginning, music was considered as an integral part in the film's storyline. The film featured several pop singles adapted for the film with a Mexican touch, using marimba, mariachi and bolero; del Toro added that the soundtrack would feature "classical, romantic Mexican songs to contemporary hits", while also adding that the music and animation would be "enchanting and gorgeous".

In April 2013, it was announced Gustavo Santaolalla would score music as well as adapting the pop songs for the film, in collaboration with songwriter Paul Williams. He earlier spoke with Guillermo del Toro on adapting a musical version of his film Pan's Labyrinth (2006), followed by Williams involvement on the project. During the discussions, director Jorge R. Gutierrez came with the script draft for The Book of Life, which Santaolalla had read and agreed to score for, after being fascinated with the storytelling and Gutierrez's vision, and also the Mexican music background, which Santaolalla had a connection with. Speaking at the ASCAP Pop Music Awards in April 2014, Williams said that his collaboration with Santaolalla as "emotional" and "amazing".

Santaolalla worked on a 90-piece orchestra conducted by Tim Davies, and also arranged a 45-piece choir for the film. Ethnic instruments were used in the film's score, such as marimba, accordion and mariachi horns. Speaking to Variety, Santaolalla said "I'm attracted to things that take me out of my comfort zone. In previous films, the music was much more discrete and subtle, less manipulative. This genre demands that I be more upfront, but the aesthetics are different." Santaolalla said Gutierrez had given full freedom to work on the score, and had scored on the musical parameters, the director had attributed.

Besides the incorporated pop songs, Williams had written two original songs, which are considered for potential Academy Award-nomination. Some of the pop songs were sung by Diego Luna and Santaolalla, who added "Diego got some coaching and was a great about doing multiple takes. He got the expression, but from that to singing is a big leap."

== Reception ==
The score received positive critical response from music critics. Jonathan Broxton wrote "When compared to some of 2014’s other outstanding animation scores, like How To Train Your Dragon 2, The Boxtrolls, or even something like Fredrik Weidmann’s Son of Batman, The Book of Life is a fairly slight score; enjoyable, but not at the same level as its contemporaries."

The Hollywood Reporter wrote "The Book of Life provides much amusement with its inspired musical choices. Besides the original score and songs by two-time Oscar winner Gustavo Santaolalla and veteran songwriter Paul Williams, there are fun, mariachi-flavored versions of such pop hits as Mumford and Sons’ “I Will Wait,” Radiohead's “Creep” and Rod Stewart's “Do You Think I’m Sexy?” among others. Luna and Saldaña provide their own singing, with impressive results." Susan Wloszczyna of RogerEbert.com called it as "quirkily eclectic soundtrack".

== Track listing ==
=== Soundtrack ===
The Book of Life (Original Motion Picture Soundtrack)
No.	Title	Artist(s)	Length
1.	"Live Life"	Jesse & Joy	3:05
2.	"The Apology Song"	La Santa Cecilia	2:32
3.	"No Matter Where You Are"	Us the Duo	2:58
4.	"I Love You Too Much"	Diego Luna; Gustavo Santaolalla	2:35
5.	"I Will Wait"	Luna; Joe Matthews; Santaolalla	1:55
6.	"Más"	Kinky	4:20
7.	"Cielito Lindo"	Plácido Domingo	0:25
8.	"Creep"	Luna; Santaolalla	1:20
9.	"Can't Help Falling In Love With You"	Luna	0:52
10.	"The Ecstasy of Gold"	Santaolalla	2:05
11.	"Do Ya Think I'm Sexy"	Gabriel Iglesias; Santaolalla	0:20
12.	"Just a Friend"	Cheech Marin	2:49
13.	"El Aparato / Land of the Remembering"	Café Tacuba; Santaolalla	1:46
14.	"Visiting Mother"	Santaolalla	1:43
15.	"The Apology Song"	Luna; Santaolalla	2:52
16.	"No Matter Where You Are"	Luna	1:37
17.	"Te Amo y Más"	Luna; Santaolalla	2:36
18.	"Si Puedes Perdonar"	Luna; Santaolalla	1:44
Total length:			37:43

=== Score ===
The Book of Life (Original Motion Picture Score)
No.	Title	Length
1.	"Special Tour"	1:02
2.	"The Book of Life Theme"	2:47
3.	"The Tale Begins"	3:00
4.	"Visiting Mother"	1:41
5.	"Lullaby Theme"	2:12
6.	"The Medal"	1:07
7.	"A Lover’s Tango"	0:37
8.	"Manolo vs Joaquin"	0:51
9.	"The Boar"	0:22
10.	"Ole!"	0:49
11.	"The Apology Song Demo"	2:51
12.	"Sanchez Bullfighting History"	2:53
13.	"The Banditos Are Coming!"	1:25
14.	"Maria is Gone"	1:01
15.	"El Aparato / Land of the Remembering" (feat. Café Tacuba)	1:46
16.	"The Sanchez Clan"	0:30
17.	"Reunited With Mother"	1:20
18.	"I Love You Too Much Demo"	2:36
19.	"Going to See La Muerte"	0:57
20.	"Maria Agrees to Marry Joaquin / Traveling to the Cave of Souls"	2:28
21.	"The Maze"	1:10
22.	"Welcome to the Cave of Souls"	0:55
23.	"The Book of Life Theme 2"	2:02
24.	"He Gave Him The Medal"	1:49
25.	"A Wager"	1:02
26.	"Chakal"	1:31
27.	"Victory / Don’t Forget Me"	2:51
28.	"Manolo is Alive"	2:43
29.	"The Apology Song Latino Americano"	2:32
Total length:		49:01

The Book of Life (Original Score) [For Your Consideration]
No.	Title	Length
1.	"Special Tour"	1:06
2.	"Mexico"	0:32
3.	"Book Of Life"	1:00
4.	"The Tale Begins"	1:42
5.	"Xibalba And La Muerte"	1:04
6.	"Always Play From The Heart"	0:13
7.	"Manolo Plays Guitar"	0:37
8.	"Visiting Mother's Grave"	1:45
9.	"Joaquin Gets Medal"	1:12
10.	"Making The Bet"	0:40
11.	"Manolo vs. Joaquin"	0:54
12.	"Joaquin And The Boar"	0:25
13.	"Boar Bullfight In Town Square"	0:52
14.	"Manolo's Broken Guitar"	2:05
15.	"Saying Goodbye To Maria"	1:33
16.	"Always Play From The Heart"	0:18
17.	"Sanchez Bullfight History"	0:38
18.	"Grandma – Kids These Days"	0:29
19.	"Joaquin Enters The Stadium"	0:14
20.	"Manolo Enters Ring"	0:21
21.	"Manolo And Drunk Friends"	0:31
22.	"Joaquin Proposes"	0:41
23.	"Manolo And Joaquin Argue"	0:44
24.	"We'll Settle This Later"	0:16
25.	"Banditos Are Coming"	0:27
26.	"Banditos Through Town"	0:28
27.	"Tell Me More"	0:23
28.	"Fight For Her"	0:47
29.	"We Found The Medal"	0:42
30.	"From Joaquin To Manolo"	0:50
31.	"Manolo Proposes"	0:47
32.	"Maria Is Dead"	1:04
33.	"Manolo Wakes Up"	0:16
34.	"The Land Of The Remembering"	0:44
35.	"The Sanchez Clan"	0:32
36.	"Reunited With Mom"	1:37
37.	"Going To See La Muerte"	1:02
38.	"Xiubalba Is Now The Ruler"	1:36
39.	"Maria Agrees To Marry Joaquin"	1:15
40.	"I Need To Be With Maria"	1:01
41.	"Traveling To The Cave Of Souls"	0:54
42.	"The Maze"	1:11
43.	"Right To Be Judged"	0:47
44.	"Welcome To The Cave Of Souls"	0:59
45.	"Candlemaker Sees All"	1:37
46.	"He Cheated"	2:03
47.	"The Truth Slips Out"	0:29
48.	"A Wager"	0:57
49.	"Manolo Faces A Bull"	2:09
50.	"Chakal Is Here"	0:51
51.	"Maria's Speech"	0:47
52.	"Chakal And Joaquin Spar"	0:50
53.	"Bullfight Continues / Reaching For Guitar"	0:56
54.	"Victory"	2:43
55.	"Sanchez Family Attacks"	0:13
56.	"Sanchez Family Attack Continued..."	1:11
57.	"Chakal Death Metal Attack"	0:18
58.	"Defeating Chakal"	1:57
59.	"Don't Forget Me"	1:00
60.	"Manolo Is Alive"	1:20
Total length:		1:33:29

== Chart performance ==
Chart (2014)	Peak position
UK Soundtrack Albums (OCC)	20
US Billboard 200	93
US Soundtrack Albums (Billboard)	22
