= The Legend of Mor'du =

- Directed by: Brian Larsen
- Written by: Steve Purcell; Brian Larsen
- Based on: Characters by Mark Andrews; Brenda Chapman
- Produced by: Galyn Susman; Mark Andrews (executive); John Lasseter (executive)
- Starring: Julie Walters; Steve Purcell; Callum O'Neill
- Cinematography: Andrew Jimenez
- Edited by: Tim Fox
- Music by: Patrick Doyle
- Production company: Pixar Animation Studios
- Distributed by: Walt Disney Studios; Home Entertainment
- Release date: November 13, 2012; (with Brave DVD)
- Running time: 7 minutes
- Country: United States
- Language: English

The Legend of Mor'du is a 2012 Pixar short attached to the Blu-ray and DVD release of Brave. It gives in-depth background about the film's villain, an evil, greedy prince as told by the eccentric witch who transformed him into the monstrous bear that he is in the film. The film combines traditional animation and computer animation.

== Plot ==
The story begins with the witch inviting a guest into her cottage and offering them several spells. When her crow suggests the bear spell, she tells the story of the prince who became the demonic bear Mor'du.

The man had been the eldest of four sons of the wise and much-beloved king of an ancient kingdom, each of whom had his own gift. Of the younger three, the youngest was wise, the third was compassionate, and the second was just. The king's eldest was strong, but he mistook strength for character. When the king died one autumn, rather than giving the eldest all the inheritance, he divided the rule among all of his sons equally, believing their kingdom could prosper through the brothers' unity. However, feeling disgraced and filled with greed and selfishness, the eldest son refused to accept this; he soon declared his claim as sole ruler in front of his brothers and demanded their obedience, breaking their family stone. His words turned to war, changing the kingdom's fate as the brothers turned against each other.

Even though the prince had a powerful army under his command, he and his brothers constantly fought to a stalemate. Whilst looking for a way to change his fate, the prince came across a menhir ring within the woods. From there, the will-o'-the-wisps guided him to the edge of a dark loch, with a cottage standing far from the shore wherein the witch lived. Hoping to turn the tide of the war to his favor, the prince persuaded the witch to make a spell that would give him the strength of ten men by offering her his signet ring, and she gave him the spell in a drinking horn but, having seen his wounded soul, warns him of making a choice: either to fulfill his dark wish or heal the family bonds he had broken. When the prince brought his brothers before him by staging up a false truce, he again claimed his kingdom. When his brothers protested, the prince in response stood before them and drank the spell, which gave him the strength he desired but, to his surprise and shock, turned him into a great black bear. However, instead of choosing to "mend the bond, torn by pride", which would have broken the spell, out of his desire for power, he accepted his new form and killed his brothers.

The prince then tried to command his army, but due to his unrecognizable new appearance, they saw him as a wild beast and attacked him in fear. Perceiving this as them turning against him, the enraged prince attacked and killed many of his former men; the survivors fled the kingdom in terror, as the fracturing of the brothers' armies lead to its collapse. Doomed to his bestial form because of his actions, the prince, now known as the "Great Black", "Mor'du", now wandered the land endlessly, his once human consciousness and intelligence overwritten by an animalistic bloodlust that compelled him to kill and instill terror wherever he roamed.

The witch ends the story here, and she offers the spell in the form of a cake to the guest, who turns out to be Wee Dingwall. Wee Dingwall panics, says he only stopped by for water, and runs out of the cottage.

== Cast ==
- Julie Walters as The Witch
- Steve Purcell as The Crow
- Callum O'Neill as Wee Dingwall
