= Partly Cloudy =

- Original poster
- Directed by: Peter Sohn
- Written by: Peter Sohn
- Produced by: Kevin Reher
- Starring: Tony Fucile; Lori Richardson
- Edited by: Jason Hudak
- Music by: Michael Giacchino
- Production company: Pixar Animation Studios
- Distributed by: Walt Disney Studios; Motion Pictures (Note: Distributed by Walt Disney Studios Motion Pictures through the Walt Disney Pictures banner.)
- Release date: May 29, 2009 (with Up)
- Running time: 5:45
- Country: United States

Partly Cloudy is a 2009 American animated comedy short film, written and directed by Peter Sohn and produced by Kevin Reher. It was shown in theaters before Pixar's feature film Up and is a special feature on its DVD and Blu-ray release. It was included in the Animation Show of Shows in 2009.

In a CGSociety article, Sohn says his idea for the film came from watching Dumbo as a child: in the movie, a stork delivers Dumbo, leading a young Sohn to wonder where the birds got their babies from. His conclusion was that the babies came from clouds, hence the need for flying animals to deliver them.

== Plot ==
All day long, cheerful clouds in the sky make cute and cuddly babies, such as human boys and girls, kittens, puppies, and other creatures, and give them to storks for delivery to the expectant parents. However, one lonely gray cloud named Gus has the task of creating animals that are cute but not so cuddly. His delivery stork, Peck, gets the worst of it, being bitten by a crocodile, butted by a bighorn sheep, and pricked by a porcupine. When Peck sees that his next delivery is a baby shark, he grows more than a little fearful and flies away.

Feeling rejected, despondent, and angry, Gus unleashes a brief thunderstorm, then starts crying with rain pouring from below him. Peck, however, soon returns with a football helmet and shoulder pads, created for him by another cloud to keep him safe (alluded to in an earlier scene, where the same cloud creates a baby that would grow to love football). Gus instantly cheers up and gives Peck an electric eel to deliver, which shocks him despite the protective equipment; this time, though, Peck remains in good (but slightly frazzled) spirits.
