= Babel (soundtrack) =

Soundtrack album by Gustavo Santaolalla
- Released: November 21, 2006
- Recorded: 2006
- Genre: Soundtrack
- Label: Concord
- Producer: Gustavo Santaolalla

Gustavo Santaolalla chronology
North Country (2005)	Babel (2006)	On the Road (2009)

Professional ratings
Review scores
Source	Rating
Allmusic	3.5/5 stars
SoundtrackNet	4.5/5 stars
Filmtracks	1.5/5 stars

Babel is the original soundtrack album, on the Concord label, of the 2006 Academy Award-nominated and Golden Globe Award-winning film Babel directed by Alejandro González Iñárritu and starring Brad Pitt, Cate Blanchett, Adriana Barraza, Gael García Bernal, Rinko Kikuchi and Kōji Yakusho. The original score and songs were composed and produced by Gustavo Santaolalla.

The album won the Academy Award for Best Original Score and the BAFTA Award for Best Film Music. It was also nominated for the Golden Globe Award for Best Original Score (lost to the score of The Painted Veil).

The closing scene of the film features Ryuichi Sakamoto's "Bibo no Aozora." Sakamoto has previously won the BAFTA, Golden Globe, Grammy, and Academy Award for his score for The Last Emperor.

== Track listing ==
=== Disc one ===
1. "Tazarine" - Gustavo Santaolalla
2. "Tu Me Acostumbraste" - Chavela Vargas
3. "September/The Joker" (ATFC"s Aces High/Shinichi Osawa remix) - Earth, Wind and Fire / Fatboy Slim
4. "Deportation/Iguazu" - Gustavo Santaolalla
5. "World Citizen-I Won't Be Disappointed" - David Sylvian/Ryuichi Sakamoto
6. "Cumbia Sobre El Rio" - Blanquito Man/Control Machete/Celso Piña
7. "Hiding It" - Gustavo Santaolalla
8. "Masterpiece" - Rip Slyme
9. "Desert Bus Ride" - Gustavo Santaolalla
10. "Bibo No Aozora/Endless Flight/Babel" - Ryuichi Sakamoto/Jaques Morelenbaum/Everton Nelson/Gustavo Santaolalla
11. "Tribal" - Gustavo Santaolalla
12. "Para Que Regreses" - El Chapo de Sinaloa
13. "Babel" - Nortec Collective
14. "Amelia Desert Morning" - Gustavo Santaolalla
15. "Jugo A La Vida" - Las Tucanes De Tijuana
16. "Breathing Soul" - Gustavo Santaolalla
17. "The Blinding Sun" - Gustavo Santaolalla

=== Disc two ===
1. "Only Love Can Conquer Hate" - Ryuichi Sakamoto
2. "El Panchangon" - Los Incomparables
3. "Two Worlds, One Heart" - Gustavo Santaolalla
4. "The Phone Call" - Gustavo Santaolalla
5. "Gekkoh" - Susumu Yokota
6. "The Catch" - Gustavo Santaolalla
7. "Mujer Hermosa" - Los Incomparables
8. "Into the Wild" - Gustavo Santaolalla
9. "Look Inside" - Gustavo Santaolalla
10. "The Master" - Gustavo Santaolalla
11. "Oh My Juliet!" - Takashi Fujii
12. "Prayer" - Gustavo Santaolalla
13. "El Besito Cachichurris" - Daniel Luna
14. "Walking in Tokyo" - Gustavo Santaolalla
15. "The Visitors" - Hamza El Din
16. "Morning Pray" - Gustavo Santaolalla
17. "Mi Adoracion" - Agua Caliente
18. "The Skin of the Earth" - Gustavo Santaolalla
19. "Bibo No Aozora/04" - Ryuichi Sakamoto/Jaques Morelenbaum
