= Chinga =

Chinga may refer to:

Places

- A political ward in the Othaya Constituency, Kenya.

People

- Chinga Chavin, American musical parodist
- La Chinga, Canadian rock band

Other

- Chinga meteorite, an iron meteorite
- Chinga (The X-Files), an episode of the television series The X-Files
- Spanish profanity meaning fuck

== See also ==
- Chingas District, a district in Peru
- La chingada, a colloquial Mexican term
