= Antonio Raymondi province =

Coordinates: 9.133°S 77.017°W

Antonio Raymondi
- Province
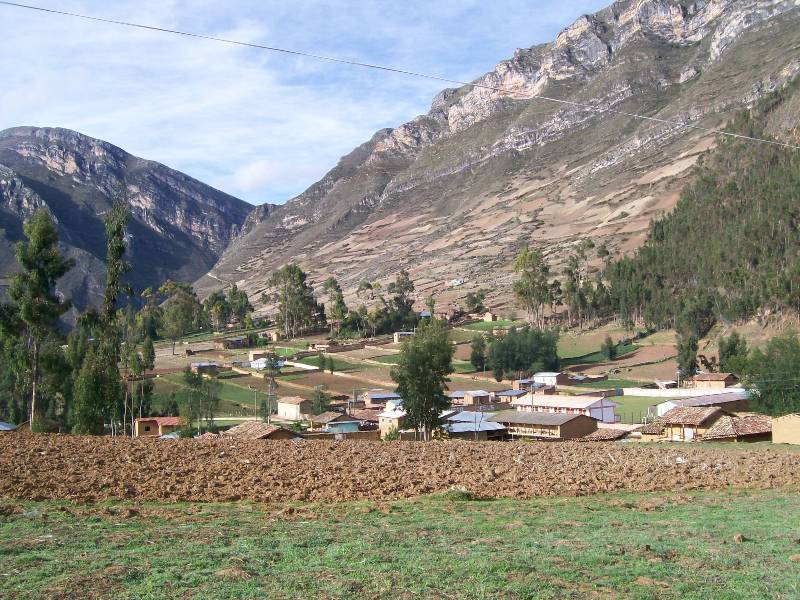
- Rontoy

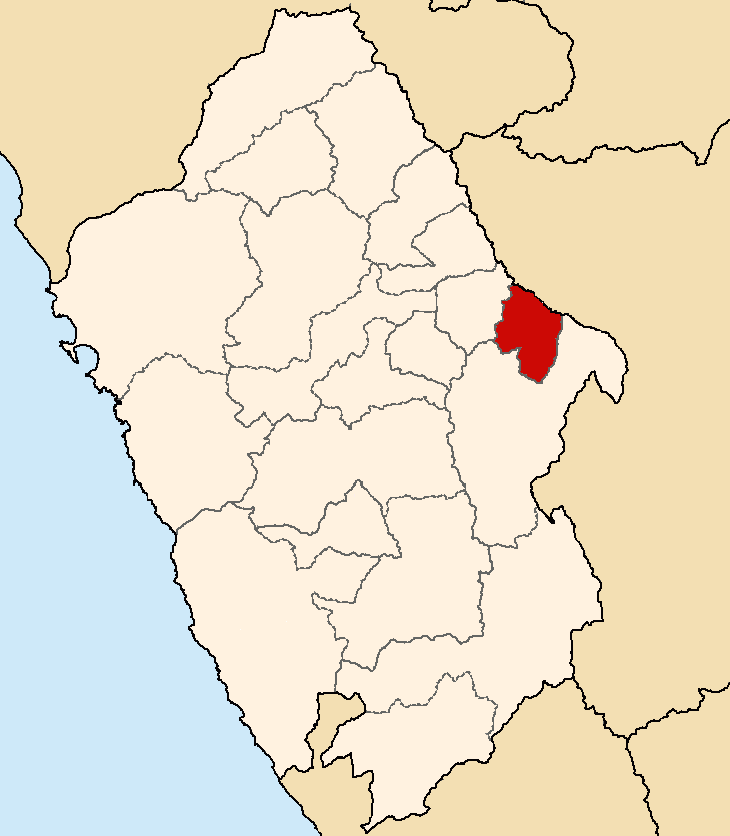
- Location of Antonio Raymondi in the Ancash Region
- Country: Peru
- Region: Ancash
- Capital: Llamellín

Government
  - Mayor: Félix Sandoval Díaz (2019-2022)

Area
  - Total: 562 km^{2} (217 sq mi)

Population
  - Total: 13,650
  - Density: 24.3/km^{2} (62.9/sq mi)

Antonio Raymondi is a province of the Ancash Region in Peru. It is located along the central eastern edge of the Ancash Region, bordering the Huánuco Region.

== Overview ==
The province was split off from the province of Huari in 1964 at the request of the inhabitants of its seat, Llamellín, and named after the native Italian geographer Antonio Raimondi, a prominent Peruvian scientist in the later half of the 19th century. He wrote the book Departamento de Ancachs.

== Geography ==
One of the highest peaks of the province is Ch'aki Qucha at approximately 4,600 m (15,100 ft). Other mountains are listed below:

- Hatun Ch'usiq
- Hatun Kunkash
- Hatun Tinyash
- Hatun Tuna
- Hirka Kancha
- Pallqu
- P'itiq Hirka
- Qalla Qalla
- Sayri
- Siniqa Hirka
- Waychu
- Wayunkayuq
- Winchus
- Yaku Quchanan

== Ethnic groups ==
The people in the province are mainly indigenous citizens of Quechua descent. Quechua is the language which the majority of the population (76.21%) learnt to speak in childhood, 23.32% of the residents started speaking using the Spanish language (2007 Peru Census).

== Political division ==
Antonio Raimondi is divided into six districts, which are:

- Aczo
- Chaccho
- Chingas
- Llamellín
- Mirgas
- San Juan de Rontoy
