= La Chinga =

Canadian rock band from Vancouver

- Also known as: Easy Reader (2012)
- Origin: Vancouver, British Columbia, Canada
- Genres: Stoner rock; hard rock; psychedelic rock
- Years active: 2012–present
- Labels: Small Stone Records; Ripple Music
- Members: Carl Spackler; Ben Yardley; Jay Solyom

La Chinga is a Canadian rock band from Vancouver, British Columbia. Formed in 2012, it consists of Carl Spackler on vocals and bass, Ben Yardley on guitars and Jay Solyom on drums. Their music has been described as a blend of classic, hard, stoner and psychedelic rock.

== History ==
The band was formed in 2012 by vocalist/bassist Carl Spackler (whose name is inspired by Bill Murray's character in Caddyshack) after he booked a gig without having a group at all. They started out as Easy Reader (named after the Morgan Freeman character in The Electric Company), but switched to the Spanish profanity La Chinga after the audience in their first show started to scream the term to them after they performed their song with that title.

Their debut, self-titled album was released in 2013. In 2016, they released their second album, Freewheelin', via Small Stone Records. Their third album, Beyond the Sky, came in 2018, and their fourth one, Primal Forces, was released in 2023 via Ripple Music.

In 2023, they participated in the Creedence Clearwater Revival tribute album Burn on the Bayou: A Heavy Underground Tribute to Creedence Clearwater Revival with a cover of "Sweet Hitch-Hiker". In March 2024, they were announced as headliners of the Indie Rock in the River festival, to be held in April in Vancouver.

== Band members ==
- Carl Spackler – vocals, bass
- Ben Yardley – guitars
- Jay Solyom – drums

== Discography ==
- La Chinga (2013)
- Freewheelin' (2016)
- Beyond the Sky (2018)
- Primal Forces (2023)
