= Chaccho District =

Coordinates: 9.060109°S 77.058789°W

Chaccho
- District
- Interactive map of Chaccho
- Country: Peru
- Region: Ancash
- Province: Antonio Raymondi
- Founded: October 26, 1964
- Capital: Chaccho

Area
  - Total: 73.99 km^{2} (28.57 sq mi)
- Elevation: 3,329 m (10,922 ft)

Population (2005 census)
  - Total: 2,137
  - Density: 28.88/km^{2} (74.80/sq mi)
- Time zone: UTC-5 (PET)
- UBIGEO: 020303

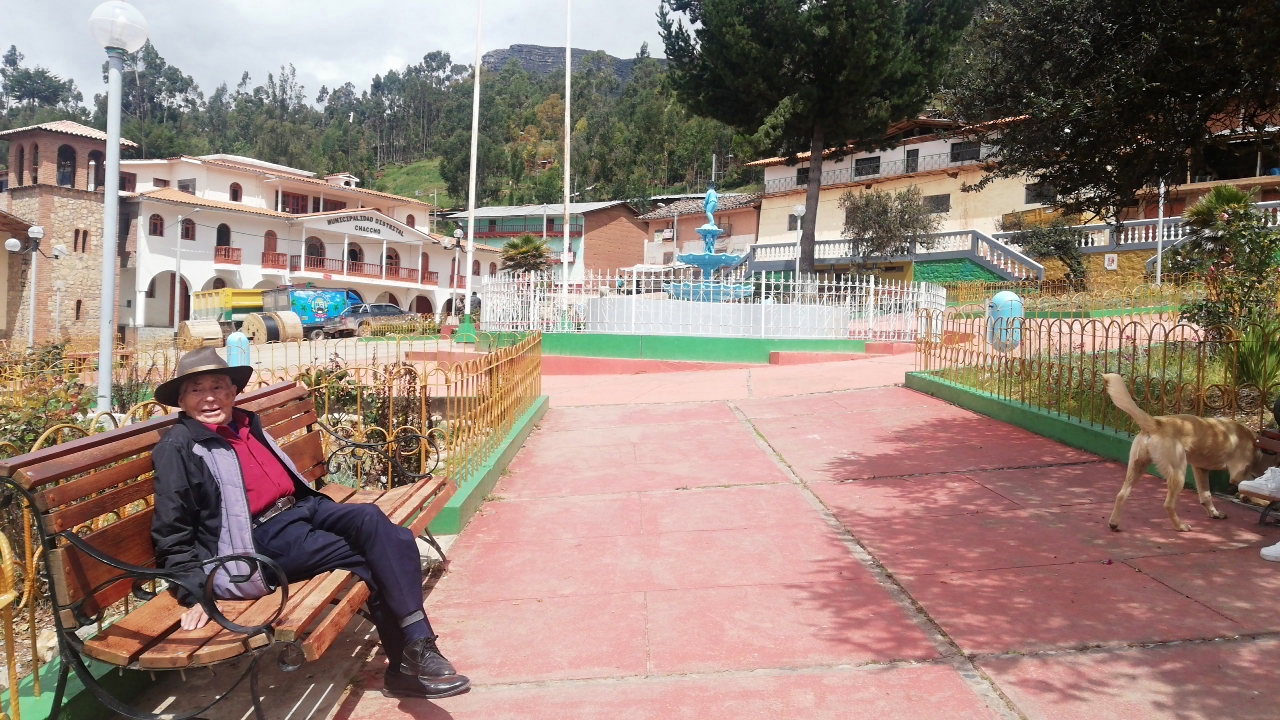
Chaccho is located in the high Andes of Perú, in the province of Antonio Raymundi.

Chaccho District is one of six districts of the Antonio Raymondi Province in Peru.

== Ethnic groups ==
The people in the district are mainly indigenous citizens of Quechua descent. Quechua is the language which the majority of the population (73.57%) learnt to speak in childhood, 25.88% of the residents started speaking using the Spanish language (2007 Peru Census).
