= Wayunkayuq =

Mountain in Peru

- Location within Peru

Highest point
- Elevation: 4,200 m (13,800 ft)
- Coordinates: 9°12′33″S 77°00′36″W

Geography
- Location: Peru, Ancash Region
- Parent range: Andes

Wayunkayuq (Quechua wayunka a bunch of bananas, -yuq a suffix to indicate ownership, "the one with a bunch of bananas", also spelled Guayoncayoc) is a mountain in the Andes of Peru which reaches a height of approximately 4,200 m (13,800 ft). It is located in the Ancash Region, Antonio Raymondi Province, Rontoy District.
