= Aczo District =

Coordinates: 9°13′01″S 76°58′01″W

Aczo
- District
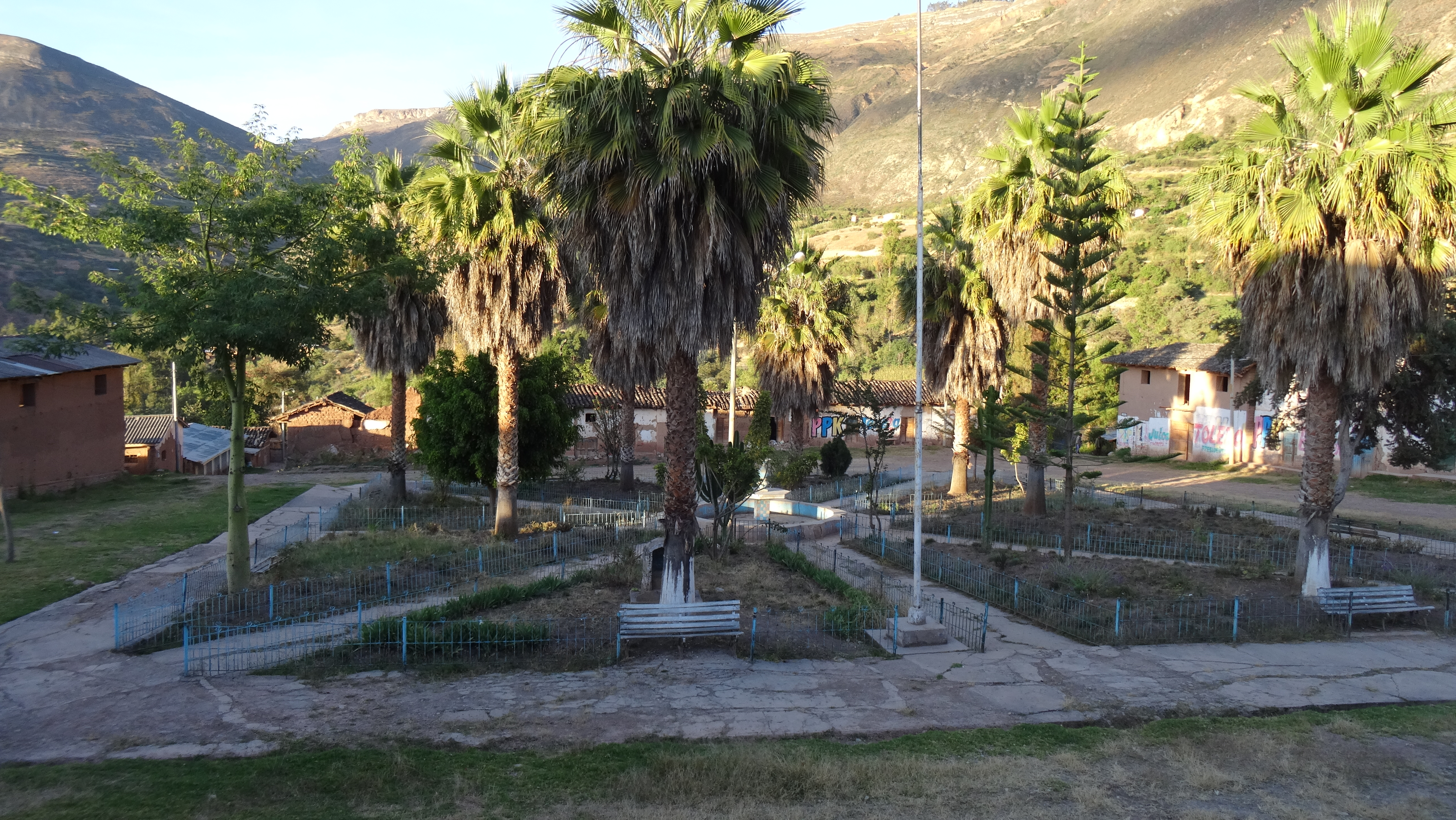
- Aczo Plaza de Armas
- Interactive map of Aczo
- Country: Peru
- Region: Ancash
- Province: Antonio Raymondi
- Founded: February 2, 1956
- Capital: Aczo

Government
  - Mayor: Juan Moises Chavarria (2019-2022)

Area
  - Total: 69.03 km^{2} (26.65 sq mi)
- Elevation: 2,661 m (8,730 ft)

Population (2017)
  - Total: 1,918
  - Density: 27.79/km^{2} (71.96/sq mi)
- Time zone: UTC-5 (PET)
- UBIGEO: 020302

Aczo District is one of six districts of the Antonio Raymondi Province in Peru.

== Ethnic groups ==
The people in the district are mainly indigenous citizens of Quechua descent. Quechua is the language which the majority of the population (73.18%) learnt to speak in childhood, 25.55% of the residents started speaking using the Spanish language (2007 Peru Census).
