= Llamellín =

Llamellín San Andrés de Llamellín
- Town
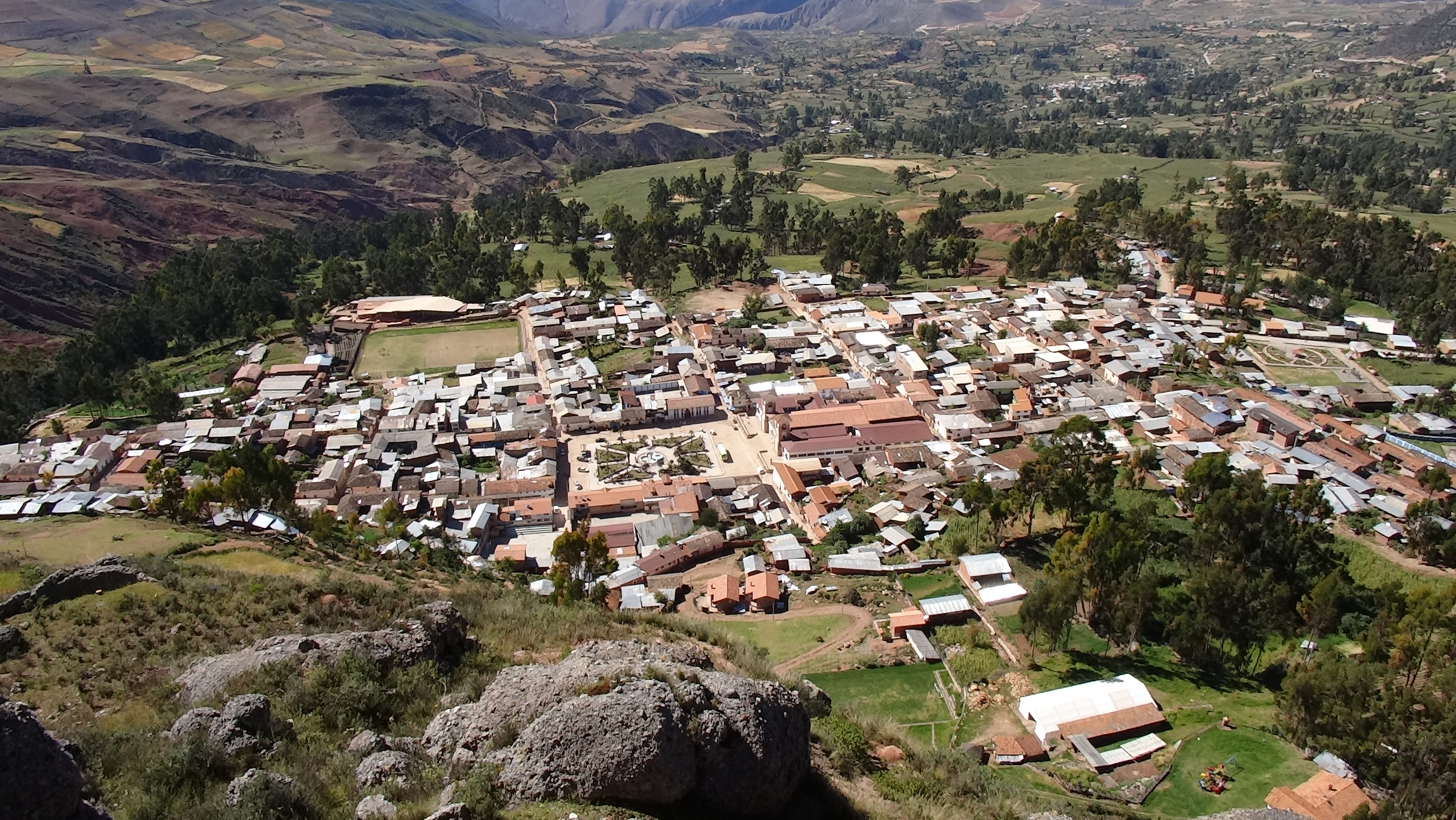
- View of the town from the Pahuacoto Hill
- Interactive map of Llamellín
- Coordinates: 9°08′S 77°01′W
- Country: Peru
- Region: Ancash
- Province: Antonio Raimondi
- District: Llamellín

Government
  - Mayor: Félix Sandoval Díaz (2019-2022)

Area
  - Total: 90.82 km^{2} (35.07 sq mi)

Population (2005)
  - Total: 3,847
  - Density: 42.36/km^{2} (109.7/sq mi)

Llamellín is a town in central Peru, capital of the province Antonio Raimondi in the region Ancash.
