= The Labyrinth of Solitude =

1950 book-length essay by Octavio Paz

- Author: Octavio Paz
- Original title: El laberinto de la soledad
- Language: Spanish
- Publication date: 1950

The Labyrinth of Solitude (Spanish: El laberinto de la soledad) is a 1950 book-length essay by the Mexican poet Octavio Paz. One of his most famous works, it consists of nine parts: "The Pachuco and other extremes", "Mexican Masks", "The Day of the Dead", "The Sons of La Malinche", "The Conquest and Colonialism", "From Independence to the Revolution", "The Mexican Intelligence", "The Present Day" and "The Dialectic of Solitude". After 1975 some editions included the three-part essay "Posdata" (this essay, which translates to "Postscript," was published previously as a standalone book in 1970, and translated for an English edition in 1972 under the title The Other Mexico: Critique of the Pyramid), which discusses the Tlatelolco massacre, in which hundreds of unarmed students at the National Autonomous University of Mexico were murdered by the Mexican Armed Forces in 1968. (Paz abandoned his position as ambassador in India in reaction to this event.) The essays are predominantly concerned with the theme of Mexican identity and demonstrate how, at the end of the existential labyrinth, there is a profound feeling of solitude. As Paz argues:

Solitude is the profoundest fact of the human condition. Man is the only being who knows he is alone, and the only one who seeks out another. His nature – if that word can be used in reference to man, who has 'invented' himself by saying 'no' to nature – consists of his longing to realize himself in another. Man is nostalgic and in search for communion. Therefore, when he is aware of himself he is aware of his lack of another, that is, of his solitude.

Paz observes that solitude is responsible for the Mexican's perspective on death, fiesta, and identity. Death is celebrated but at the same time repelled because of the uncertainty behind it. As for the fiestas, they express a sense of communality, crucially emphasizing the idea of not being alone and in doing so, help to bring out the true Mexican that is usually hidden behind a mask of self-denial. This represents the way in which the Mexicans have inherited two distinct cultures, the Spanish and the Indigenous, but by denying one part of their identity, they become stuck in a world of solitude.

From the chapter "The Conquest and Colonialism" onwards, Paz makes a detailed analysis of Mexican history beginning with a look at the Pre-Columbian culture and in particular reflecting on the 1910 Revolution. In his analysis, he expresses how the humanists take a primary role as the intellectuals of the country. His major criticism is that to be an intellectual it is necessary to distance oneself from the subject that you are studying so that the argument remains critical yet rational and objective. As the intellectual gets more involved with the political environment, his arguments can often become influenced by other factors such as political motivation and pressure to conform.

== See also ==
- La chingada
