= Llamellín District =

Coordinates: 9°07′59″S 77°01′01″W

Llamellín
- District
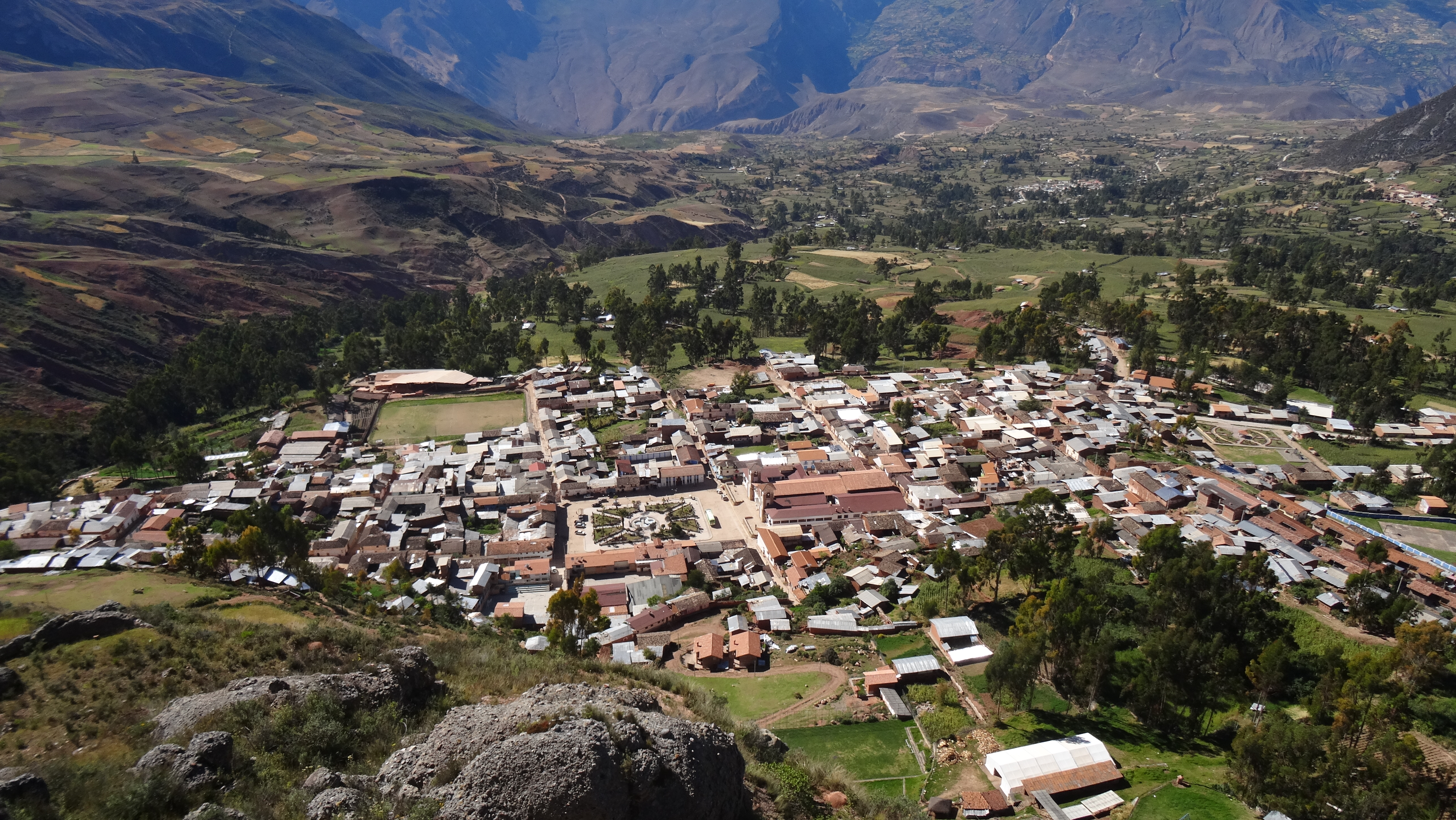
- Interactive map of Llamellín
- Country: Peru
- Region: Ancash
- Province: Antonio Raymondi
- Capital: Llamellín

Government
  - Mayor: Robert Nilton Torres Torres

Area
  - Total: 90.82 km^{2} (35.07 sq mi)
- Elevation: 3,384 m (11,102 ft)

Population (2005 census)
  - Total: 3,847
  - Density: 42.36/km^{2} (109.7/sq mi)
- Time zone: UTC-5 (PET)
- UBIGEO: 020301
- Website: munillamellin.gob.pe

Llamellín is a district of the Antonio Raymondi Province in the Ancash Region of Peru.

== Geography and climate ==
Llamellín is the capital of the province which is located in the eastern flank of the mountain range. It has a variety of microclimates with altitudes ranging the 1,800 to the 4,800 metres above sea level.

It has warm temperatures, but often has cold, humid droughts. The rainy season is from November to March. More intense precipitation falls between January and March of every year. The dry season is generally April to October. The inhabitants are bilingual: they speak quechua and Spanish.

The town of Llamellín lies at approximately 3,200 metres above sea level with a temperature average of 16.6 °C (61.88 °F) during the day and 12.6 °C (54.68 °F) during the nights.

== Ethnic groups ==
The people in the district are mainly indigenous citizens of Quechua descent. Quechua is the language which the majority of the population (61.37%) learnt to speak in childhood, 38.10% of the residents started speaking using the Spanish language (2007 Peru Census).
