= San Juan de Rontoy District =

Coordinates: 9.066°S 77.038°W

San Juan de Rontoy Runtuy
- District
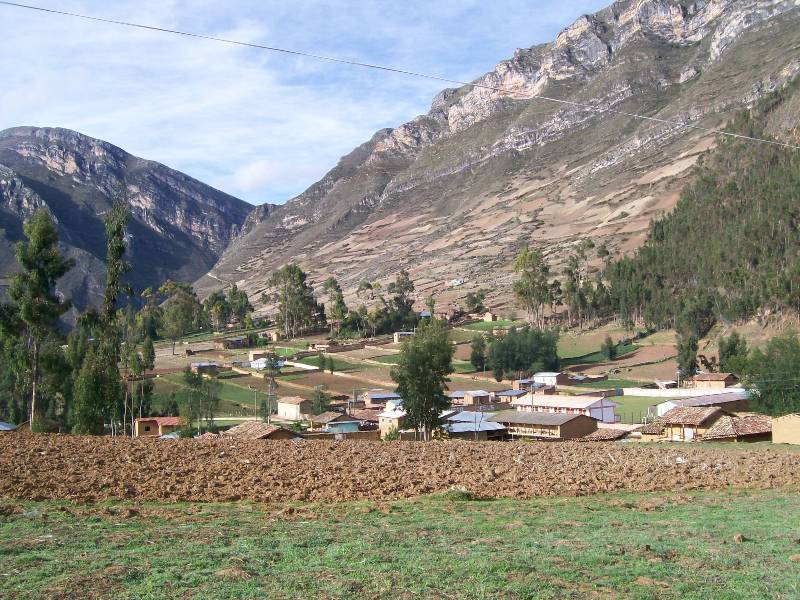
- Rontoy
- Interactive map of San Juan de Rontoy
- Country: Peru
- Region: Ancash
- Province: Antonio Raymondi
- Founded: May 27, 1987
- Capital: San Juan de Rontoy

Government
  - Mayor: Felix Sandoval Diaz

Area
  - Total: 103.13 km^{2} (39.82 sq mi)
- Elevation: 3,525 m (11,565 ft)

Population (2005 census)
  - Total: 1,605
  - Density: 15.56/km^{2} (40.31/sq mi)
- Time zone: UTC-5 (PET)
- UBIGEO: 020306

San Juan de Rontoy District is one of six districts of the province Antonio Raymondi in Peru.

== Ethnic groups ==
The people in the district are mainly indigenous citizens of Quechua descent. Quechua is the language which the majority of the population (85.62%) learnt to speak in childhood, 13.91% of the residents started speaking using the Spanish language (2007 Peru Census).

== See also ==
- Wayunkayuq
