= Mirgas District =

Coordinates: 9°00′00″S 77°01′59″W

Mirgas
- District
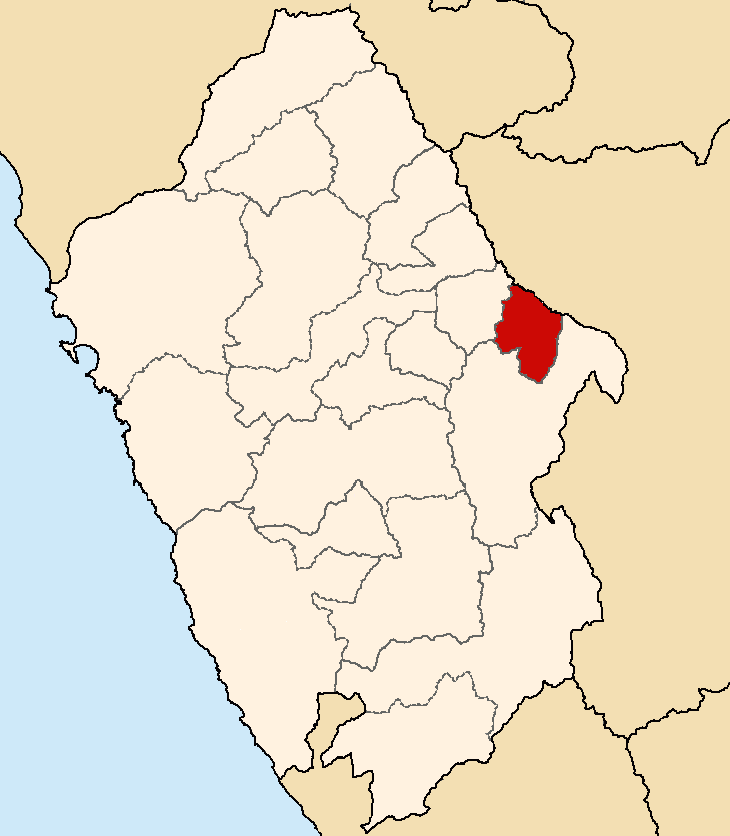
- Location of the Antonio Raymondi province in the Ancash region, in which Mirgas District is located
- Interactive map of Mirgas
- Country: Peru
- Region: Ancash
- Province: Antonio Raymondi
- Founded: October 26, 1964
- Capital: Mirgas

Government
  - Mayor: Julio Rodriguez Sifuentes

Area
  - Total: 175.69 km^{2} (67.83 sq mi)
- Elevation: 3,175 m (10,417 ft)

Population (2005 census)
  - Total: 5,595
  - Density: 31.85/km^{2} (82.48/sq mi)
- Time zone: UTC-5 (PET)
- UBIGEO: 020305

Mirgas District is one of six districts of the province Antonio Raymondi in Peru.

== Ethnic groups ==
The people in the district are mainly indigenous citizens of Quechua descent. Quechua is the language which the majority of the population (94.12%) learnt to speak in childhood, 5.70% of the residents started speaking using the Spanish language (2007 Peru Census).
