= Chingas District =

Coordinates: 9°04′01″S 76°58′01″W

Chingas
- District
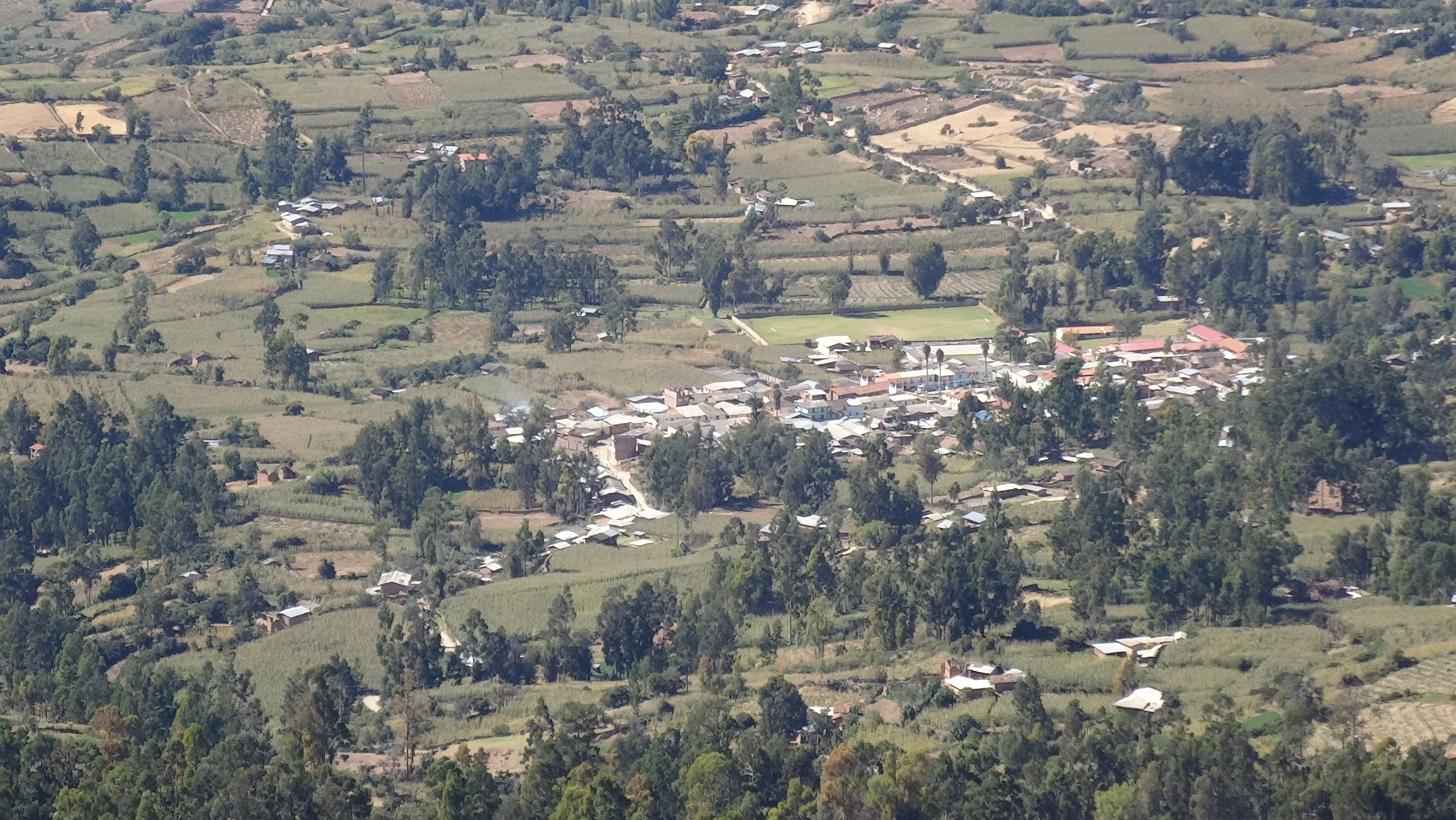
- Interactive map of Chingas
- Country: Peru
- Region: Ancash
- Province: Antonio Raymondi
- Founded: February 2, 1956
- Capital: Chingas

Government
  - Mayor: Emmer Torre (2019-2022)

Area
  - Total: 48.95 km^{2} (18.90 sq mi)
- Elevation: 2,854 m (9,364 ft)

Population (2017)
  - Total: 1,851
  - Density: 37.81/km^{2} (97.94/sq mi)
- Time zone: UTC-5 (PET)
- UBIGEO: 020304

Chingas District is one of six districts of the Antonio Raymondi Province in Peru.

It limits with the districts of Aczo, Llamellin and the Province of Huari.

Chingas is one of the most productive valleys of the Alley of Conchucos.

This district was founded on September 21, 1956.

== Ethnic groups ==
The people in the district are mainly indigenous citizens of Quechua descent. Quechua is the language which the majority of the population (57.66%) learnt to speak in childhood, 42.24% of the residents started speaking using the Spanish language (2007 Peru Census).
