= Spanish profanity =

Swear words in Spanish-speaking nations

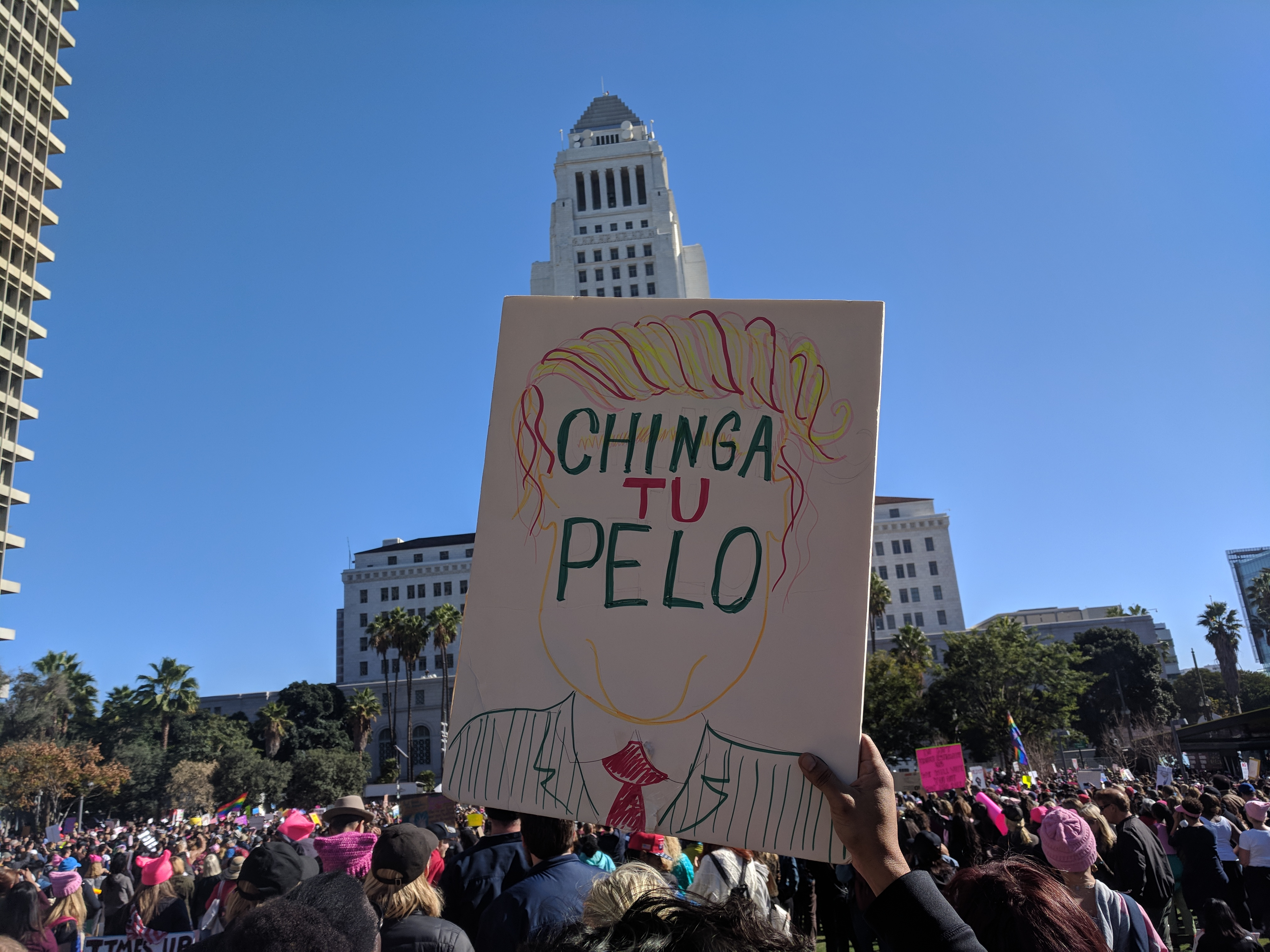
Chinga tu pelo ('Fuck your hair') sign, 2018 – Los Angeles Women's March Downtown Los Angeles, California, US

The Spanish language employs a wide range of swear words that vary between Spanish-speaking nations and in regions and subcultures of each nation. Idiomatic expressions, particularly profanity, are not always directly translatable into other languages, and so most of the English translations offered in this article are very rough and most likely do not reflect the full meaning of the expression they intend to translate.^{[c]}

== Overview ==
In Spanish, as in most languages, swear words tend to come from semantic domains considered taboo, such as human excretions, sexuality, and religion, and swearing serves several functions in discourse.^{[c]} Spanish insults are often of a sexual nature, taking the form of implying a lack of sexual decency if the insulted person is a woman (e.g. puta, "whore", perra "bitch") or implying a supposed lack of masculinity if the insulted person is male (e.g. maricón "faggot", puto "male prostitute"). A particularly forceful Spanish insult is any mention of someone else's mother, including also in its strongest form (e.g. ¡me cago en tu puta madre! "fuck your whore of a mother!", in which me cago out of context means "I shit", but in this sentence it expresses disregard). Emphatic exclamations, not aimed to insult but to express strong emotion, often include words for sexual relations (e.g. ¡joder! "fuck!", ¡chingados! "fuckers!") or to excretions or sexual organs (¡mierda! "shit!", ¡coño! "cunt!"). Sexual taboo words that describe a masculine sexuality may be used in a positive sense (e.g. cabrón "billy goat", gallo "rooster", cerdo "pig").

== References to sexual acts ==
The following words are indicative of a variety of sexual acts, especially sexual intercourse, masturbation, and oral sex, though mostly limited to specific geographic regions.

=== Chingar ===
chingar — originating from the Basque verb txingartu, meaning "to burn with coal" or from Caló (Spanish Romani) word čingarár, meaning "to fight". In the work La Chingada, it was famously applied to La Malinche, the mistress of Hernán Cortés.^{[a]}

==== Chingado/da ====
The word is derived from chingar which means "to fuck." This word has many meanings in the Spanish language, most limited to Mexico:^{[a]}

- Adjective for damage (e.g. "Este niño se subió a la bicicleta y ahora su rodilla está chingada" – "This kid rode his bike and now his knee is fucked up/fucking damaged.")
- Noun for a bad place to go (e.g. "¡Ya me tienes harto! ¡Vete a la chingada!" – "I'm done with you! Go fuck yourself!/Get the fuck out of here!")
- Interjection (e.g. "¿Se sacó todas bien el tonto? ¡Ah, chingado!" – "Did the dumb guy get all the questions right? Oh, fuck!")
- Adjective for awful (e.g. "Este restaurante está de la chingada" – "This restaurant is fucking awful.")

These words are often used in the following contexts:

- ¡Hijo/a de la chingada! (idiom, adjective) "Son/daughter of a fucker!"
- ¡Chingada madre! (interjection) = "Damn it!"
- ¡Vete a la chingada! (noun) = "Go fuck yourself!" or "Get the fuck out of here!"

==== Chingón/a ====
Like chingado, the word comes from chingar. When used to describe a person, it describes someone who can "chingar" others; in other words, "better", "the best" or even "badass".^{[a]}

=== Follar ===
follar (used particularly in Spain and to a lesser extent in Cuba, but rarely found elsewhere) literally means "to blow air with the bellows" and probably refers to panting during sex.^{[a]}

=== Joder ===
The verb joder/joderse (from older hoder, from Old Spanish foder, fuder, from Latin futuo) is a harsh way of saying "to bother" and its English equivalent is "fuck". It can literally mean "to fuck somebody" e.g. anoche, Juan y su novia jodieron ("last night Juan and his girlfriend fucked"), or it can mean "to annoy", "to ruin", etc. no me jodas (don't annoy/bother me), or lo has jodido (you've fucked it up). It can be used as an adjective, like the English "fucking" (jodido) and is often used as a light interjection: ¡Joder! Olvidé mi abrigo ("Fuck! I've forgotten my coat").^{[a]} Alternative ways of referring to sexual intercourse include: follar, echar un polvo (Argentina, Spain), coger (Argentina, Mexico), chimar, pisar (Central America), culear (Argentina, Chile and Colombia), singar (Cuba), garchar, mojar la chaucha, ponerla (Argentina), cachar (Peru) and enterrar el boñato (Uruguay).^{[a]}

=== Remojar el cochayuyo ===
Remojar el cochayuyo (lit.to soak the cochayuyo) — used in Chile The expression alludes to the cochayuyo algae that are harvested on Chile's coast. The algae are preserved by sun-drying. To be used for cooking, they then need to be softened by soaking in water.^{[a]}

=== Coger ===
Coger can be confused with the verb "to take" but in the majority of Latin America is used to talk about taking someone sexually.

== References to the male genitalia ==
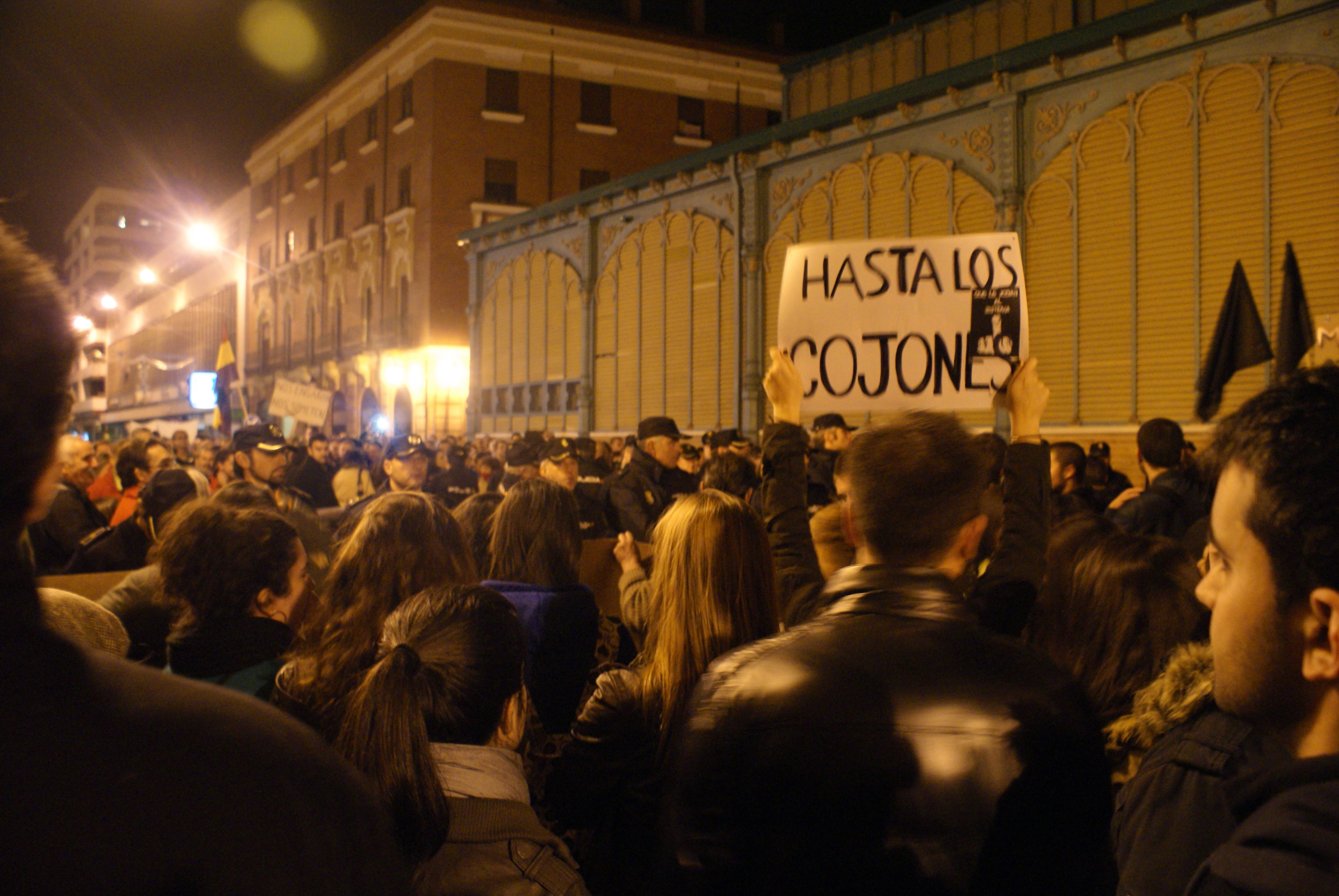
Hasta los cojones ("Fed up"). A placed sticker is seen in a close-up view that reads: Que le jodan al sistema ("Fuck the system")

=== Cojón ===
Cojón (plural cojones) is slang for "testicle" and may be used as a synonym for "guts" or "[having] what it takes", hence making it equivalent to English balls or bollocks.^{[a]} A common expression in Spain is anything to the effect of hace lo que le sale de los cojones ("does whatever comes out of their balls"), meaning "does whatever the fuck they want". Variations are sale de los huevos, sale de las pelotas, etc. A common Basque aphorism is los de Bilbao nacemos donde nos sale de los cojones ("we Bilbao natives are born wherever the fuck we want"). Sometimes, to denote obnoxious or overbearing behavior from someone else, idiom tocar los cojones/huevos/pelotas ("to touch someone else's balls") comes to play. For instance: Venga, dame eso y para ya de tocarme los cojones ("Come on, give me that and stop bothering me.") It can sometimes be an understatement: A principios de los treinta, los nazis ya empezaban a tocar los cojones (meaning, roughly, "At the beginning of the 1930s, the Nazis were already being an annoyance."). It is also frequent to derive other words, such as adjectival form cojonudo (lit. 'ballsy'), indicating admiration. A famous Navarran brand of asparagus has this name.

Cojones can also denotes courageous behavior or character. Acts of courage or bravery are expressed by using the word cojones. For example, "Hay que tener cojones para hacer eso" ("it takes cojones to do that"). It is sometimes used, at least in Spain, as a suffix, complement or termination to a word or name in order to confer it a derisive or overbearing quality. For instance: el Marcos de los cojones ("That fucking guy Marcos"), ¡Dame ya la maleta de los cojones! ("Give me the fucking suitcase why don't you!") However, it is more common to use "de cojones" as a superlative, as in Es bajo de cojones ("He's short as hell" or "He's short as fuck"). The phrases me importa un cojón or me importa un huevo mean "I don't give a fuck about". In alternative variations one would raise the number, usually to three: me importa tres cojones. Cojones alone can be used much like the four-word exclamations, though less usually; it is frequently a giveaway for native Catalan speakers when they speak Spanish, as collons is used much more profusely in situations akin to those for "fuck" or "shit". Tocarse los cojones/los huevos/las pelotas/las peras (lit. 'to touch one's own balls') refers to idleness or laziness; in Chile, the preferred variant is rascarse las huevas (lit. 'to scratch one's own balls'). Unfamiliarity with this expression in the United States may have been a factor in the dismissal and suicide of Antonio Calvo, a senior lecturer at Princeton University, in April 2011.

Derivative of cojón	English equivalent	English literal translation
Un cojón	A damn/fucking lot	A ball
¡Los cojones!	No fucking way! / My ass! / Like hell!	The balls!
Costar un cojón	Cost a damn/fucking fortune	Cost a ball
Importar tres cojones	Not fucking mind at all	To mind three balls
Mil pares de cojones	Very fucking difficult	A thousand pairs of balls
Tener cojones	To be fucking brave	To have balls
¡Tiene cojones (la cosa)!	To be fucking upset about something / That's fucking crazy!	(The thing) has balls!
Cortarle los cojones	To fucking threaten	To cut (his) balls
Tocarle los cojones a	To fucking annoy somebody	Touch (his) balls
Acojonado,-a	Fucking scared	N/A
Descojonarse de la risa	To piss oneself laughing	De-ball oneself with laughter
Acojonante	Very damn/fucking funny/scary	N/A
¡Tócate los cojones!	What a damn/fucking surprise! / You've got to be fucking kidding me! / Go fuck yourself!	Touch your balls!
Cojonudo,-a	Fucking awesome/perfection	Ballsy
De cojones	Fucking perfectly	Of balls
Por cojones	With no other damn/fucking choice	By balls
Hasta los cojones	Up to the brink / Fucking fed up	Up to the balls
Me toca los cojones	It fucking annoys me	It touches my balls
Con dos cojones	Bravely, courageously	With two balls
Lo que me sale de los cojones	Whatever the hell/fuck I want	What comes out of my balls
No tener cojones	To be a fucking coward	Have no balls
Pasárselo por los cojones	Don't give a shit/damn/fuck	Pass it by the balls
Echarle cojones a algo	To brave something out / To have the guts to do something	Throw balls on something
¡Olé tus cojones!	Good for you!	Hurray your balls!
Los cojones morados	Cold as hell/fuck	Purple balls
Mis cojones treinta y tres	I don't fucking believe you, liar	My balls thirty-three
Me repatea los cojones	It fucking infuriates me	It kicks my balls
Por mis santos cojones	I fucking promise	By my holy balls
A cojones	By doing whatever it fucking takes	By balls
¿Qué cojones?	What the hell/fuck?	What the balls?

=== Carajo ===
Carajo (lit. 'crow's nest') is used in Spain in reference to the penis. In Latin America (except Chile), it is a commonly used generic interjection similar to "fuck!" "shit!" or "damn it!" in English. For example: Nos vamos a morir, ¡carajo! ("We're gonna die, fuck!") or a far away place, likened to hell: ¡Vete al carajo!.^{[a]} In Argentina, the term "Vamos Carajo" was used in Quilmes advertising in advance of the 2014 FIFA World Cup as a statement or cheer that an Argentine supporter would use to urge their team to victory. The diminutive carajito is used in Colombia, the Dominican Republic and Venezuela to refer to (usually annoying) children, or to scold someone for acting immaturely, e.g., No actúes como un carajito ("Don't act like a little dick!").

Caray is a mild minced oath for this word. Ay caray could be translated "Dang it" or "Darn it!" The word caracho is also considered mild like caray. The connotation of "far away place" is supposedly based on the name of the Cargados Carajos, which belong to Mauritius. Nationalistic chants commonly use the phrase: ¡Viva Cuba, carajo!, ¡Viva el Ecuador, carajo!, and ¡Viva el Perú, carajo!^{[a]}

=== Bicho ===
Bicho (lit. 'bug' or 'baitworm') is one of the most commonly used references to the penis in Puerto Rico. It is similar to the much less commonly used word pinga. In most other regions it is a non-vulgar reference to an insect or several species of small animals.^{[a]} In the Caribbean coast of Colombia bicho is used to reference the anus or the bottom. In Venezuela, it can be used as an interjection. In El Salvador, it is commonly used as the slang equivalent of "kids". In Nicaragua, and some parts of Costa Rica, bicho is used to reference the vagina. In Spain, Dominican Republic, Mexico and many other Spanish speaking countries it refers to people (both male and female) who are a negative influence on others, often used as mal bicho ("bad bug"). When applied to children, it can mean one who is misbehaving.

=== Huevos/pelotas/bolas/albóndigas/peras ===
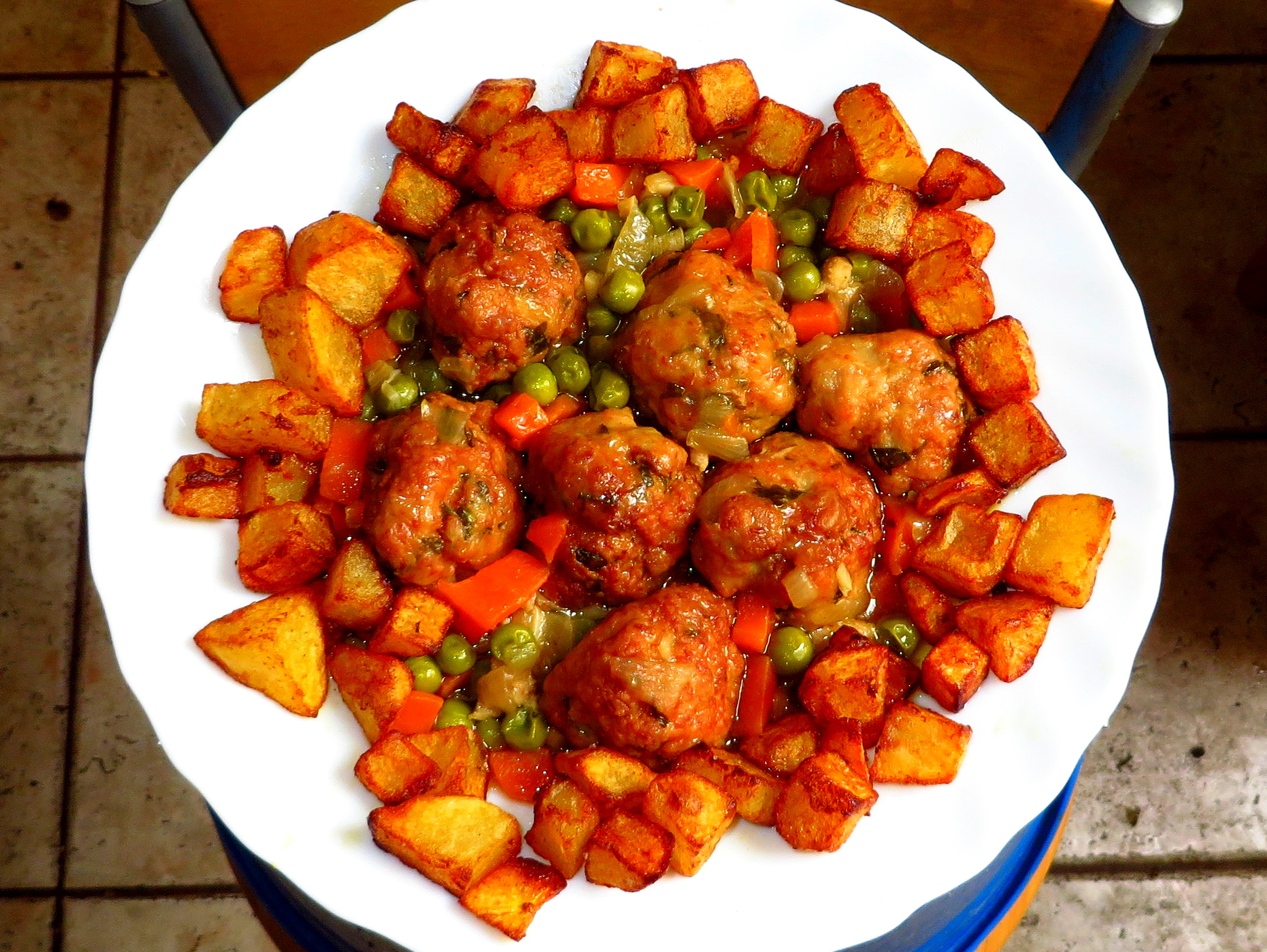
Albóndigas – meatball

Huevos (lit. 'eggs'), pelotas and bolas (both literally meaning 'balls'), peras (lit. 'pears'), and albóndigas (lit. 'meatballs') all refer to testicles in a profane manner. They are equivalent to cojones in many situations. In Mexico, the word is not used in a potentially ambiguous situation; instead, one may use the inoffensive blanquillos (lit. 'little white ones').^{[a]} Sometimes the words lavahuevos ('egg-washer') or lamehuevos ('egg-licker') are used in the same context as 'brown-noser' (meaning ambitious and self-effacing) in English. Highly offensive Dominican insults involving this term are mamagüevo(s) ('egg-sucker') and mamagüevazo ('huge egg-sucker'). Mamagüevo is also used in Venezuela where it is considered less offensive.

Huevada and huevá (lit. 'covered in egg') is used in Chile, Ecuador, and Peru in reference to objects ("¡Qué huevá más grande!" may translate to "What an annoyance!"). Shortened forms huevá or even weá and wa are usually intended to be less offensive. Many expressions using cojones in other countries are used in Chile with huevas replacing the former word. There's also a local expression: "¿Me hai visto las weas?" (lit. '"Have you taken a look at my testicles?"'), meaning "How much of a fool do you think I am?" Ñema a corruption of yema, meaning 'yolk', refers to the glans. The word mamañema is functionally similar to mamagüevo. Pelotas can have another meaning when it comes to nudity. Andar en pelotas means 'to walk about stark naked'.

==== Oversized testicles as a marker of complacency ====
- Bolsón (lit. 'big bag'): One whose testicles are so large, they have a large scrotum which prevents them from working.
- Huevón (lit. 'big egg')/Ahueonao/Ahuevoneado/Ahuevado (lit. 'one who has large eggs'/Boludo (lit. 'one who has large balls') is a strong personal reference in many Latin American countries. At times it can be used as an ironic term of endearment, especially in Argentina, the same way as dude or "dawg" in North America (much like güey in Mexico), comparably with Greek malaka. For example, in Chile one would understand a sentence like "Puta el huevón huevón, huevón." as "Fuck! That guy is an asshole, dude."^{[a]}

In Mexico, huevón is a pejorative term usually translated as 'slacker'. In Mexico, Panama and El Salvador, it can be loosely translated as 'couch potato'. One may also say tengo hueva, meaning "I'm feeling lazy." In Colombia, the Dominican Republic and Venezuela, güevón/güebón is the preferred form. In Venezuela, it is pronounced more like güevón or often ueón. In Chile and Peru, the preferred form to use is huevón (often shortened to hueón or weón) and ahuevonado/aweonao. In Panama, awebao is the popular form, and a good example of the clipping of consonants (and sometimes vowels) in informal Spanish.

In Argentina, boludo can be used by young people as a culturally appropriated term of endearment (¿cómo andás, boludo? = how are you doing, pal?), but it can also mean 'slacker', 'idiot', 'ignorant', etc. In Chile, Peru and the Quito region of Ecuador, Ni cagando, huevón is a phrase commonly used among youth meaning "Don't even think about it" or "Not a chance". In Mexico, Tenga huevos (lit. 'Have eggs') translates as "Have some balls". For example, one can hear a Mexican say No corras, ten huevos which means "Don't run away, have some balls".

=== Verga ===
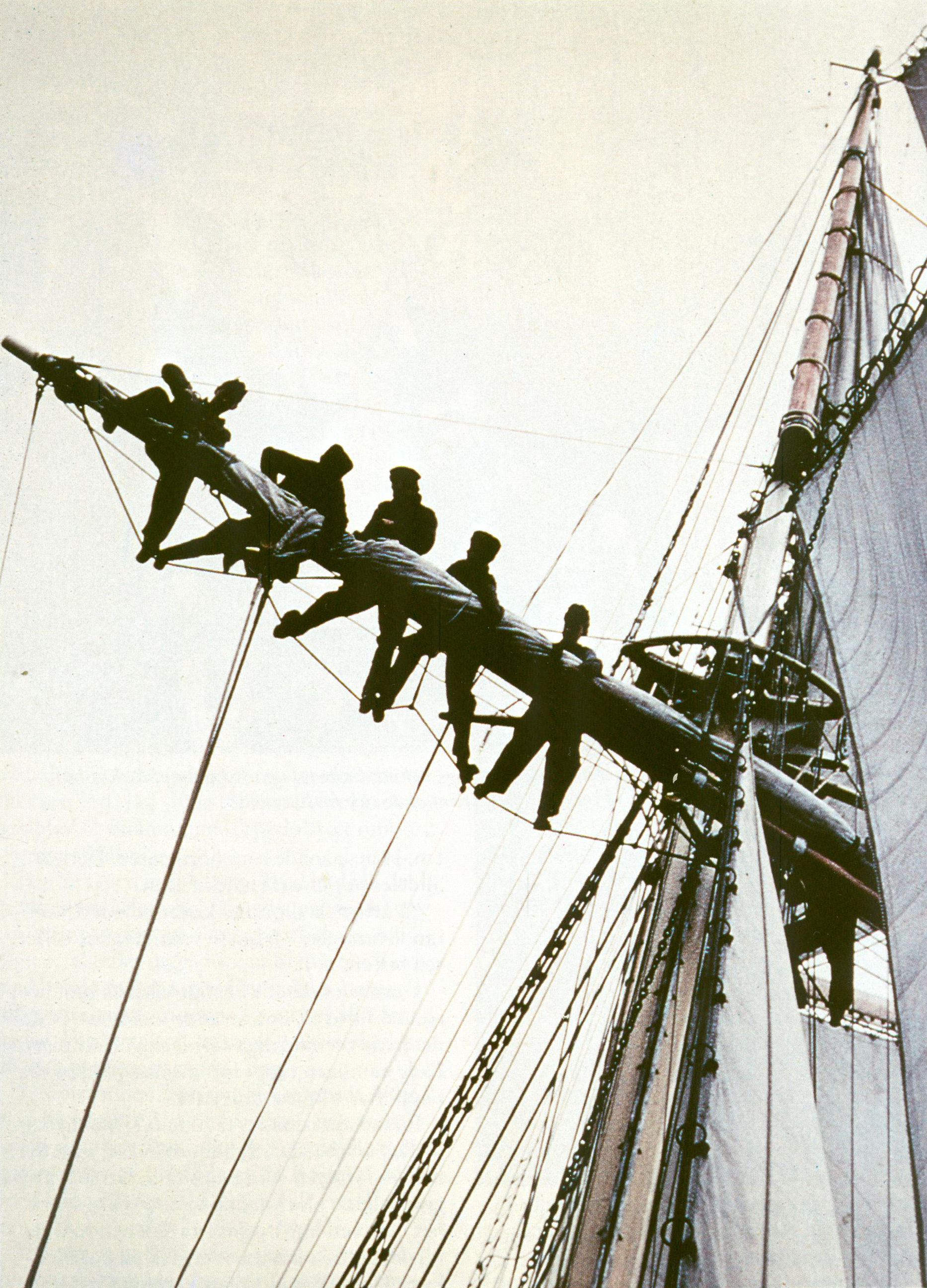
Seamen on a yardarm

Verga (lit. 'a yardarm'—a part of a ship's mast that holds the sails) occurs in a number of Romance languages, including Portuguese and Italian.^{[a]} In Colombia, Panama and Venezuela it can be used as a vulgar generic filler, as well as a boastful self-reference (similar to the English "That shit" or "I'm the shit"). For example, ¡Soy bien verga! (lit. '"I'm good dick!"') means "I'm very good at it!", and ¡Soy la verga andando! (lit. '"I'm the walking dick!"') means "I'm the best that there is!"^{[a]} However, in the Venezuelan state of Zulia, the word is commonly used instead of vaina.

In Mexico it refers to the penis; "Te voy a meter la verga" means "I'm going to insert my penis in you"; referring to somebody else, "Le metió la verga" or "se la metió" means "he fucked her/him" which may be the literal meaning, or more likely, it means that in a business, he got away with what he wanted for little money. It also have another meanings and derivative terms, for example: "Soy la verga" ("I am the best one"); "Me fué de la verga" (roughly "something bad happened to me"); "Me vale verga" ("I don't care"); "Vergueé" ("I ruined it", "I failed"); "Me verguearon" ("They defeated me"); "Me pusieron una verguiza" ("They scolded me", "They beat me"); "Vergón" ("cocky", "cool", "sexy"); "Está de la verga" ("That's ugly/bad" but also "That's very cool", "That's awesome") etc.

A common expression in Mexico is ¡Vete a la verga!, meaning "Get the fuck out of here!" In Mexico this can be used to mean difficult or impossible: ¡Está de la verga!, "This is very difficult!" In Guatemala, it also refers to a state of drunkenness as in ¡Está bien a verga!, meaning "He's drunk as Hell!" or "He's shit-faced!". In El Salvador it can also be used with an ironically positive connotation as in ¡Se ve bien vergón! or ¡Está bien vergón!, which means "It looks great!" In Colombia, Honduras and Panama the expression no vale (ni) verga is used as a vulgar form of no vale la pena, meaning "it's not worth it". In Nicaragua, the expression "¡A la verga!" means "Screw it!" which is used in Honduras also. In the United States, the variant "a la verga" or "a la vé" for short, is very common in northern New Mexico, and is used frequently as an exclamatory expletive.^{[a]}

=== Polla ===
Polla (lit. 'female pollo i.e. chicken' or 'hen') is used in Spain, Nicaragua, El Salvador and to a lesser extent in Puerto Rico. It is also used to mean a (young) female (similar to "chick"). Some years ago, in Costa Rica, the term jupa de pollo ("head of a chicken") was popular slang for "penis". The term todo el jupa de pollo was a popular way to say "the whole shebang", "the full Monty" or "it's complete now".^{[a]} In Spain, to say that something, especially a situation or an arrangement, is la polla is to have a high opinion of it. Esto es la polla. El hotel está al lado de la playa y además es muy barato means "This is fucking great. The hotel is close to the beach and it's cheap, too." In Spain, it also means penis or cock. Common expression in Spain is anything to the effect of hace lo que le sale de la polla ("does whatever comes out of his penis"), meaning "does whatever the fuck he/she wants". It can be used as a vulgar generic filler, as well as a boastful self-reference (similar to the English "That shit" or "I'm the shit"). For example, ¡Soy la polla! (lit. ' I'm the hen!') means "I'm very good at it!"

=== Other terms denoting male genitalia ===
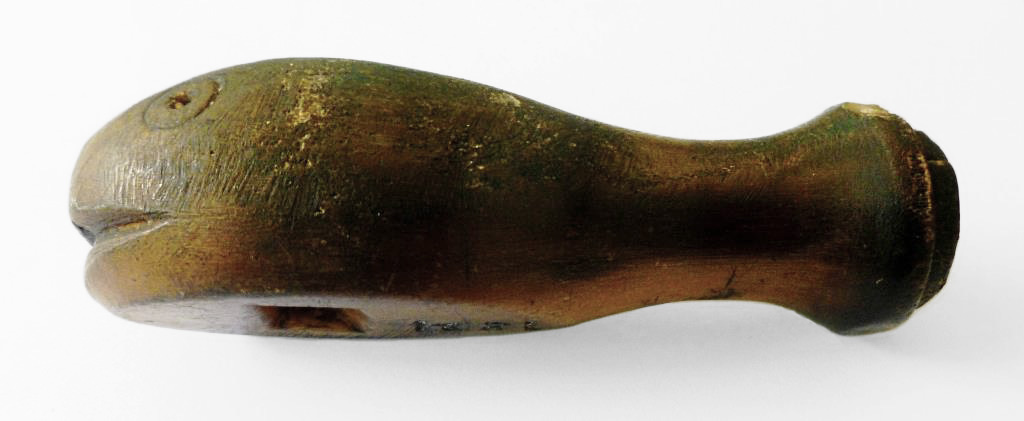
Carved whalebone whistle

Chilean Spanish has a variety of alternative names and euphemisms for the penis. These range from inoffensive, such as pito (lit. 'whistle'), diuca (after a small bird), through vulgar (pichula, pico) and euphemistic (cabeza de bombero (lit. 'firefighters head'), dedo sin uña ("nail-less finger")) to markedly euphemistic and humorous ("taladro de carne" (lit. 'meat drill'), "cíclope llorón" (lit. 'crying cyclops'), "chacal de las zorras" (lit. 'cunt jackal in the sense of the jackal being a relentless predator'), et cetera).

Something similar happens in Argentina. From the classic "pito" or "pirulín" (a cone-shaped lollipop), which are innocent and even used by children, you can go all the way to the most vulgar ways as "pija", "verga" (lit. 'yardarm'), "choto/chota" (after "chotar" which means "to suck"), "porongo/poronga" (a "gourd", which is also used to craft "mates"), "banana", "salchicha/chorizo" (two kind of sausages), "pedazo" (lit. 'piece'), "garcha" (also used as the verb garchar, which means "to fuck" or something of extremely bad quality), "palanca de cambios" (gear stick), "joystick", "bombilla de cuero" (lit. 'leathery bombilla; bombillas are used for drinking mate by sucking into them'), etc. Among young people, almost every word can be turned into the meaning "dick" if said effusively and with connotation: -"¿Me pasás el encendedor?" -"¡Acá tengo un encendedor para vos!" (-"Can you give me the lighter?" -"I have a lighter for you right here!"). In the Caribbean coast of Colombia, "mondá" (from mondada, the peeled one) is used as a variant for verga. Other words include picha, pinga, yarda, yaya, cañafístula, guasamayeta, animaleja, copa, cotopla, gamba, palo, trola, tubo and pipí, the latter being innocent and mostly used to refer to a child's penis.

== References to the female genitalia ==
=== Concha / chucha / chocha ===
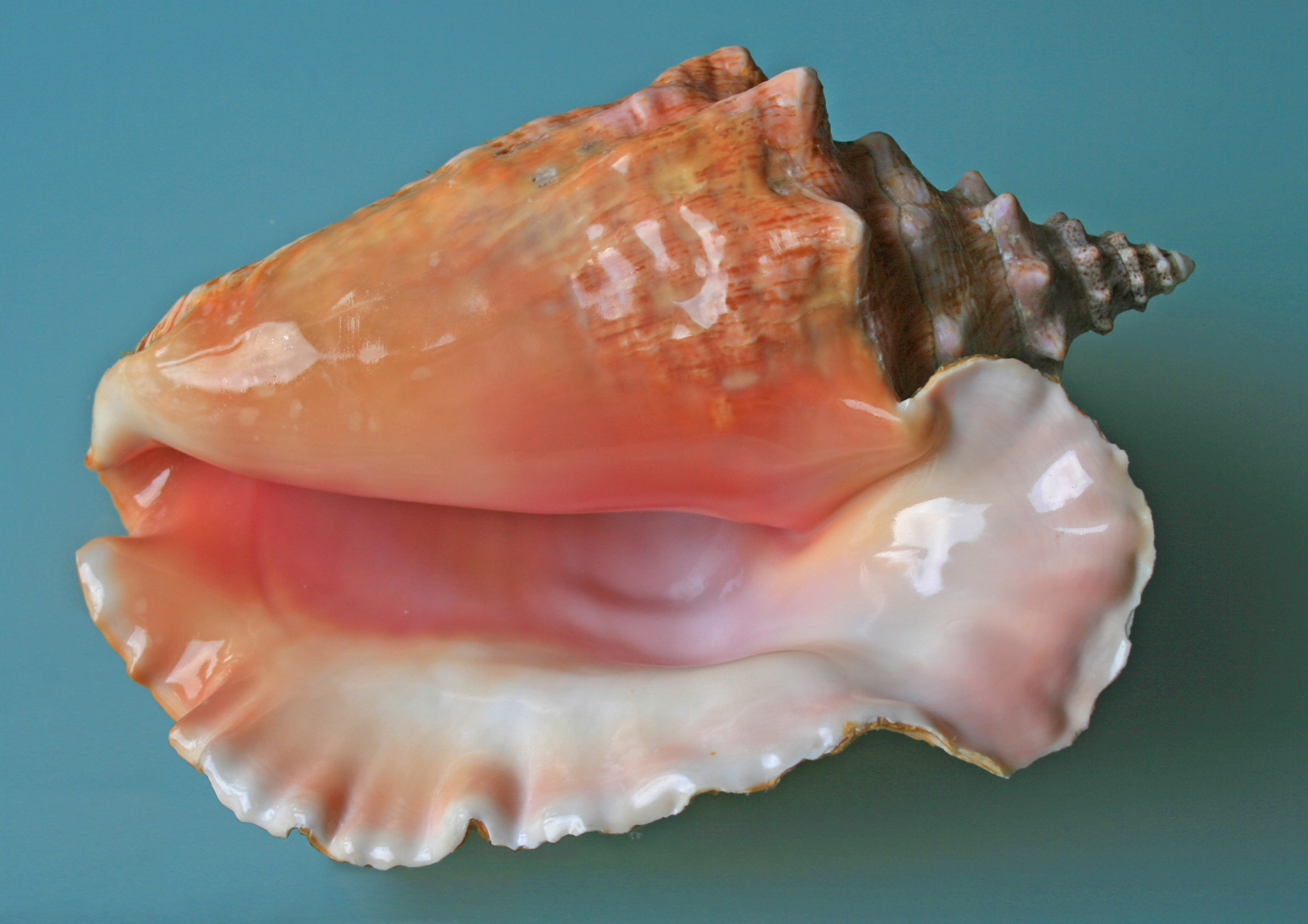
Conch

Concha (lit. ' mollusk shell' or 'inner ear') is an offensive word for a woman's vulva or vagina (i.e. something akin to English cunt) in Argentina, Colombia, Chile, Ecuador, Paraguay, Peru, Uruguay and Mexico. In the rest of Latin America and Spain however, the word is only used with its literal meaning. In the former regions, it is commonly heard in the phrase ¡(La) concha (de) tu madre! ("The cunt of your mother"), which may be used as an expression of surprise or grief, or as a highly disrespectful insult. The contracted term conchatumadre/conchetumadre is common and extremely offensive in Chile, Bolivia and Peru as well.

In Mexico, concha, which is used in its literal meaning, is also a type of sweet bread, round conch-shaped and covered in sugar, as well as having the aforementioned meaning and is offensive when used in said context. In Spain, Puerto Rico, Cuba and Mexico, "Concha" is a common name for females (corruption of Concepción). Also in Puerto Rico there is a popular hotel called La Concha Resort (The Seashell). Key West, Florida also has a famous hotel named La Concha. Concha can also mean a seashell-a conch. Chucha/¡Chuchamadre! and ¡Chucha de tu madre! are Panamanian, Chilean, Ecuadorian, Peruvian or southern Colombian equivalents. Random examples and expressions: Vení, oleme la chucha ("Come and sniff my pussy"), ¡Ándate a la chucha! (roughly "Fuck off").^{[a]}

Chocha (or chocho, usually used in Spain) employed term for "pussy" predominantly in Cuba, Puerto Rico, Colombia (chocho), Spain, Mexico, Venezuela, and Dominican Republic. In the Spanish province of Albacete is also used choto (var. chotera, chotaco) in the same sense. The word is a homonym as it is also synonymous with "senile" when used as "He/she is chocho/chocha". In Chile, the word is used to mean "happy", and is used for old people; for example, the sentence "La abuelita quedó chocha con el regalo que le dí" means "Granny was happy with the gift I gave her".^{[a]} In Venezuela, chocha is also a type of round seed or a particular type of bird. The name of the Latin American restaurant Chimi-Changa originated as a minced oath of chocha.

=== Coño ===
Coño (from the Latin cunnus) is a vulgar word for a woman's vulva or vagina. It is frequently translated as "cunt" but is considered much less offensive (it is much more common to hear the word coño on Spanish television than the word cunt on British television, for example).^{[a]} In Puerto Rico, Spain, Venezuela, Cuba, the Dominican Republic and Panama it is amongst the most popular of curse words. The word is frequently used as an interjection, expressing surprise, anger or frustration. It is also common to use the expression ¿Pero qué coño? to mean "What the fuck?" Its usage was so common among Spaniards and Spanish-Filipino mestizos living in the Philippines that konyo became a Tagalog word for upper-class people. In Ecuador and Chile, it means stingy, tight-fisted, although in the latter country the variation coñete is becoming more common.

=== Panocha ===
In Colombia, Mexico and the Philippines, panocha (or panoche) refers generally to sweet breads or cakes, or, more specifically, to a raw, coarse form of sugar produced there. It is also a fudge made with brown sugar, butter, cream or milk, and nuts (penuche). In New Mexico it means a sprouted-wheat pudding. In the southwestern United States outside of Northern New Mexico (and in northern Mexico and some places in Cuba), however, it often refers to the female genitalia. Use of this word has been known to cause embarrassment among Hispanos of New Mexico when speaking with Mexicans from Mexico. The word is a combination of penuche and panoja meaning "ear of corn", from the Latin panicula (from whence comes the English word "panicle"—pyramidal, loosely branched flower cluster).^{[a]}

=== Cuca ===
Cuca (short for cucaracha, lit.: "cockroach") is used in Honduras, Guatemala, Panama, Venezuela, southeastern México and Colombia. It is slightly milder than coño, and almost inoffensive in the Dominican Republic.^{[a]} In the Dominican Republic it is a common term for a parrot, whereas in Chile it is criminal slang for police van. In general, it is used to refer to something considered scary. It is also an inoffensive word for penis that many children use in Spain. It also has a slightly archaic use in Spain. In Nicaragua and in the Canary Islands, it is also used as slang for "penis."^{[a]} In Latin America, it may describe a congenial, outgoing person with a gift for flattery ("Julia is very cuca") or ("Eddie is so cuco; look at all the friends he has."), and is occasionally used as a shortened nickname for those named Refugia (The male equivalent for Refugio being Cuco). It is often the diminutive of the name María del Refugio. In Cuba, it is also used as a term for a charley horse.

== References to the female breasts ==
Although less used as profanity, some words for the bust can also be used derogatorily or humorously. Among them, some noteworthy are peras (lit. 'pears'), perolas (lit. 'pearls'), mingas, tatas, tetas, tetamen, tetitas, tetazas, tetorras, tetotas, tetarracas, tetuzas, tetacas, teturras, tetungas, tetillas, bufas, bufarras, bufarracas, bufoncias, mamelungas, mamelones, domingas, bubalongas, babungas, pechugas, peritas, mamellas, tetolas, gemelas, pechamen, melones, lolas, or chichis.

== References to the buttocks ==
=== Culo ===
Culo (from Latin culus) is the most commonly used Spanish word for "ass." In Spain, it is mild to inoffensive, and usually the only common way to talk about the buttocks and anus area in a colloquial context. It is also used, even formally, for the bottom part of many things (e.g. el culo del vaso = the bottom of the (drinking) glass, etc.) There is an even milder diminutive, culete, that is only used with little children or for humoristic effect, if ever. Another diminutive, culín, can also be used with very little children but is more often heard to refer to a small amount of a drink served in a glass or cup (ponme un culín de whisky, por favor = please serve me a little bit of whiskey). In El Salvador and Honduras, culero ("one who uses the culo") refers to a gay man, while in Mexico it refers to an unjust, unkind, aggressive or insensitive person likened to the connotation provided by the word asshole or something of bad quality but usually more offensive. Vete a tomar por culo ("Go and take it in the ass") is an expression used in Spain, it is like Vete a la mierda but more offensive.^{[a]} Me parto el culo ("I break my ass") is used to express laughter. It can also mean to do excessive work, usually accompanied by a verb that indicates the work, e.g. Me parto el culo barriendo ("I work my ass off brooming").

In Chile and Peru, culo is considered offensive (as it sounds very much like culear); poto is used instead. In Argentina culo or culito are almost innocent words, though they can also be considered vulgar depending on the context. Expressions like en el culo del mundo (lit. 'in the ass of the world'), en la loma del culo (lit. 'In the ass hill'), which mean "too far away" or cara de culo (lit. 'ass face used to describe an unpleasant face expression') are regularly used. In Panama culo is used to construct slang terms and phrases which range from slightly inappropriate to offensive but commonly used regardless. Cara de culo (ass face) refers to an unattractive person especially when the person in question has a round face with protruding cheeks. Culo del mundo (asshole of the world) and casa del culo (ass house) mean far away e.g. Vivo por casa del culo/en el culo del mundo (lit. 'I live by ass house/in the asshole of the world'). Culear means to have sexual intercourse—the same as fuck in its literal meaning— but does not imply anal sex.

Culito (little ass) is used by a penetrative partner to refer to a receptive partner in a sexual context; it is also used to refer to the buttocks in an inappropriate but affectionate way. Culo de botella (bottle ass) refers to thick eyeglasses. ¡Ponte placa en el culo! (put a license plate on your ass!) is a phrase yelled by motorists at pedestrians who are standing or walking in the middle of the road, particularly in heavy traffic. Recular means to go on reverse while estacionarse/parquearse de recula means to reverse park. Culillo means fear while culilloso/a refers to someone who gets scared easily. Hablar hasta por el culo (To talk out of the ass)—a local, impolite variant of the well-known phrase Hablar hasta por los codos (to talk through the elbows)—refers to someone who talks a lot; this variant is used to refer to a person in a negative way (as in "He/she won't shut up") while Hablar hasta por los codos does not necessarily imply annoyance.

=== Fundillo/fundío ===
Fundillo/fundío—heard in Mexico and the southwestern United States as an obscene term specifically for the human anus. It carries about the same weight as the American usages of the words "(someone's) asshole" or "the crack of (someone's) ass." Fundío refers literally to the anus and is not used as a personal insult. For example, ¡Métetelo en fundío! (or in Mexico, Métetelo por el fundillo) is an expression of reproach. ("Shove it up your ass!") The variant fondillo is also found in Puerto Rico and Cuba. In the Dominican Republic, the milder term fullín and the very offensive cieso may also be used.^{[a]}

=== Ojete ===
Ojete (lit. ' eyelet')—refers to the anus in some countries, and also is used to mean "asshole": Se portó para el ojete conmigo ("He was a really bad person with me", or "He was an asshole to me").^{[a]} A popular obscene graffito in Mexico among schoolchildren is OGT; when the letters are pronounced in Spanish, they sound like ojete. In Argentina and Uruguay, "ojete" and also its synonyms culo and orto can all be used to mean "good luck": ¡Qué ojete tiene ese tipo! (He's such a lucky guy!), Ganó de puro ojete! (He won just because he was so terribly lucky).

=== Orto ===
Orto (a euphemism for "recto", that is rectum, from Greek ortho-, as both rectum and ortho- mean "straight". Although due to its lower class origin it is also believed (and more likely) to be the vesre form of roto, which means "broken", for "culo roto".)—in Argentina, Uruguay, and Chile, refers to buttocks (as either an object of appreciation or disgust): "Qué tremendo orto tiene esa mina" (in praise of a woman's buttocks), "Qué cara de orto" ("What an ugly/bitter/moody face"); or luck—either good or bad. "Me fue para el orto" and "Me fue como el orto." mean "I had an awfully bad luck on that". "Tiene un orto que no se puede creer" may mean "He/She is incredibly lucky" but can also be an appraisal of a someone's derriere, depending on context.^{[a]}

=== Other references to one's backside ===
- cola
- de pedo ("by farting")—another Argentinean expression meaning "fortunate." For example: Lo adiviné de pedo ("I was lucky enough to guess it").
- al pedo ("in a farty fashion")—used in Argentina for "wasting time." E.G.: Estás muy al pedo ("You are doing absolutely nothing").
- qué pedo — Informal greeting among youngsters in Mexico: "¡qué pedo!". It is also used as an interjection to express a spontaneous reaction to something, E.G: "Qué pedo contigo", "Qué pedo con la vida". "Qué pex" is a common variation of this phrase.
- en pedo ("in a fart")—which means "drunk" in Argentina.
- en una nube de pedos ("inside a fart cloud")—also in Argentina, meaning not concerned about whatever happens around you, outside your cloud.
- a los (santos) pedos (like (holy) farts)—means "extremely fast" in Argentina. It came into being due to a mispronunciation of Emil Zátopek's surname as "Satospé". Corre a lo Satospé ("He runs like Zátopek"). "A lo Satospé" then turned in "a los santos pé...", and finally in "a los (santos) pedos").
- al peo ("in a farty fashion")—used in Chile to express something done poorly or in a careless manner.
- nalga (butt cheek).
- poto – used in Chile and Peru for buttocks.
- roto/rota (lit. ' broken')—specifically refers to the anus.

== References to scatological acts ==
=== Cagar ===
Cagar, just as in Portuguese, Catalan, or Occitan, is a verb meaning "to shit." It also means to screw (something) up, e.g. ¡Te cagaste los pantalones! ("You shit your pants!").

Particularly in Spain and Cuba, there are a number of commonly used interjections incorporating this verb, many of which refer to defecating on something sacred, e.g. Me cago en Dios ("I shit on God"), Me cago en la Virgen ("I shit on the Virgin"), Me cago en la hostia ("I shit on the communion host")... Me cago en el coño de tu madre (Lit: I shit in your mother's cunt) is the strongest offense among Cubans. In Cuba, to soften the word in social gatherings, the "g" is substituted by the "s", resulting in casar (lit. 'to marry') instead of cagar.^{[a]}. In Spain, one of the harshest insults—especially among the Romani community—is Me cago en tus muertos (lit. 'I shit on your dead [relatives]'). This expression is particularly common in southern areas of the Iberian Peninsula, such as Andalusia. It is also common all across the country to curse someone's relatives with expressions like Me cago en tu madre (lit. 'I shit on your mother'), sometimes intensifying it with the adjective puto/a ('whore'), as in Me cago en tu puta madre. Other frequently used expressions to convey anger in Spain include Me cago en la puta (lit. 'I shit on the bitch') or Me cago en todo (lit. 'I shit on everything'). Euphemistic alternatives are also widespread, like Me cago en la mar (lit. 'I shit on the sea') or Me cago en la leche (lit. 'I shit on the milk'). In order to avoid blasphemy, Spaniards may as well replace Dios ('God') with phonetically similar words, as in Me cago en diez (lit. 'I shit on ten').

In several countries, including Colombia, Venezuela, Costa Rica, Mexico, Peru, Argentina, Cuba, Chile, Panama and Spain, it also means to make a big mistake or damage something i.e. fuck something up, e.g.: La cagaste (lit. ' you shat on it') or "Nos van a cagar." ("They're going to fuck us"). In Argentina and Chile, it can also mean "you screwed" or "scolded" somebody (e.g.: Te cagaste a ese cabrón, "You took a shit on that guy"). In Colombia and Panama "la cagada" ("the shit") refers to something or someone that makes everything else go wrong or the one detail that is wrong about something (and is thus the complete opposite of the American slang the shit); e.g., Ese man es la cagada ("That dude is shit" i.e. a fuck up/fucks everything up), La cagada aqui es el tranque ("The traffic jams are shit here" i.e. are fucked up, fuck this place/everything up).

In Mexico City, it may be used ironically to refer to a fortunate outcome: Te cagaste ("You really shat on yourself") or an unfortunate outcome such as Estás cagado meaning "you're fucked". In Chile and Cuba, cagado ("full of shit") means "stingy" or "miserly". It can also mean "depressed" in some contexts ("Está cagado porque la polola lo pateó." translates as "He's depressed because his girlfriend dumped him."). Also, in Chile it can also have a more neutral connotation. La cagó ("shat it") can be used to agree on a previous statement ("Chilean Spanish makes no sense", "Sí, la cagó")

=== Mierda ===
Mierda is a noun meaning "shit." However, phrases such as Vete a la mierda (literally: "Go to (the) shit") would translate as "Go fuck yourself."^{[a]} In Cuba, comemierda (shit-eater) refers to a clueless idiot, someone absurdly pretentious, or someone out of touch with his or her surroundings. Ex. "que comemierderia" (how stupid), "¿comerán mierda?" (are they stupid or what?) or "vamos a prestar atención y dejar de comer mierda" (Let's pay attention and stop goofing off). It is also used in both countries to describe someone who is "stuffy" and unnecessarily formal. In Puerto Rico and the Dominican Republic comemierda refers solely to a snobbish person, while in Panama it refers to someone who is both snobbish and mean and/or hypocritical. In Peru, irse a la mierda means "to be drunk as Hell." In Mexico, Cuba, Chile and also in Peru estar hecho mierda means to be very exhausted.

In northern Mexico and the southwestern United States (particularly California), the phrase mierda de toro(s) (literally "shit from bull(s)") is used often as a Spanish translation of bullshit in response to what is seen by the Spanish speaker as perceived nonsense.^{[a]} It is also used generally to describe anything that is vexing or unpleasant, such as tiempo de mierda ("shitty weather") or auto de mierda ("piece-of-shit car"). A less common use is as a translation of the British profanity "bugger". The euphemisms miércoles (Wednesday) and eme (the letter m) are sometimes used as minced oaths. Caca is a mild word used mostly by children, loosely comparable to the English "poop" or "doo-doo." Comecaca is functionally similar to comemierdas.^{[a]}

=== Pedorrez ===
Pedorrez (bullshit) is slang to characterize a stupid, stupid action or idea, especially lacking in energy, relevance, and depth.

=== Mojón ===
Mojón is a term originally meaning a little marker of the name of the street or a particular place in a road, it later went into general use to refer to a turd and thus became a synonym for shit; it is used freely as a substitute. In Cuba, the term "comemojones" is frequently used instead of "comemierda"; "Es un mojón." ("He's a piece of shit.") is also commonly used in said country.^{[a]}

== Homosexual slurs ==
=== Maricón ===
Maricón (lit. 'big Mary') and its derivative words marica (and less commonly, marico) are words used for referring to a man as gay, or for criticizing someone for doing something that, according to stereotypes, only a gay person would do (marica was originally the diminutive of the very common female name María del Carmen, a usage that has been lost). The suffix -ón is often added to nouns to intensify their meaning.^{[a]} In Spain, the Dominican Republic, Puerto Rico, and Cuba, the word has a stronger meaning with a very negative emphasis; akin to "faggot" or "poof" in the English language. In Argentina, Peru, Chile, and Mexico maricón or marica is especially used to denote a "chicken" (coward). In Chile, maricón also means "irrationally sadistic".^{[a]} Some examples of the uses of this word are:

- Eres un marica. ("You are a faggot.")
- Mano, eres tremendamente maricón. ("Bro, you are so gay!"; here maricón is used as an adjective)
- Yo sí soy maricón, ¿y qué? ("I am certainly gay—so what?")
- No seas maricón. ("Don't chicken out", "Don't be a pussy.", "Don't be an asshole.")
- ¡Qué maricón de mierda, ¿eh?! ("He's such a damn faggot, right?!")
- Devuelve la mamadera al bebé, que lo haces llorar. ¡No seas maricón! ("Give the baby back his bottle, because now you've made him cry. Don't be cruel!")

Two important exceptions are Colombia and Venezuela; in Colombia, marica is used as a slang term of affection among male friends or as a general exclamation (¡Ay, marica! being equivalent to "Aw, man!" or "Dude!" in English), whereas in Venezuela marico is used as the masculine form with marica being feminine. In Colombia marica can also mean 'naive' or 'dull'; sentences like "No, marica, ese marica si es mucho marica tan marica, marica" (Hey dude, that guy is such a fool faggot, boy) can be heard. This often causes confusion or unintended offense among Spanish-speaking first-time visitors to Colombia. Maricón, however, remains an insulting and profane term for homosexuals in Colombia as well. A similar case is seen in Venezuela, where the word marico is an insult; however, the word is widely used among Venezuelans as "dude" or "man." For example, "¿qué pasó, marico?" would mean "what's up, dude?" The word carries at least a third meaning in Venezuela because it is often used to show that someone is being very funny. For instance, after hearing a joke or funny comment from a friend, someone might laugh and say "haha sí eres marico haha" which would be equivalent to "haha, you crack me up man."^{[a]} Derivatives of marica/maricón:

- maricona—used in southern Spain to refer to a drag queen, in an often humorous manner. Elsewhere, maricona refers to a lesbian. In Cuba it is used in a friendly manner among gays.
- mariquita (diminiuitive of marica)—means a wimp or sissy in Spain. For example, ¡Eres una mariquita!, means "You're a pussy!" It also means ladybug. In Cuba, however, the term refers both to a dish of fried plantains and to being gay.
- marimacha (portmanteau of maricon and macha)—an insult common in Peru, Chile and Cuba, usually referring to lesbians or to women trying to do something seen as a males-only activity. It is considered offensive as mari prolongs the original insult macha. In Colombia, Macha is the feminine form of macho and thus refers to a tomboy (it is not really an insult, but more of a derogatory way to describe a masculine/unlady-like girl).
- maricueca (portmanteau of maricon and cueca (female cueco, see below))—used in Chile
- mariconzón (portmanteau of maricón and colizón) In Cuba, a slang term of affection among gays.
- mariposa (lit. ' butterfly')—used as a minced oath. The word mariposón ("big ol' butterfly") may also be used.

=== Manflor ===
Manflor (combination of the English loanword "man" and the word flor meaning "flower") and its variant manflora (a play on manflor using the word flora) are used in Mexico and in the US to refer, usually pejoratively, to a lesbian. (In Eastern Guatemala, the variation mamplor is used.) It is used in very much the same way as the English word "dyke." For example: Oye, güey, no toques a esa chica; todos ya saben que es manflora. ("Hey, dude, don't hit on that girl; everyone knows she's a dyke."). It can be used as an ironic term of endearment between friends, especially within the gay and lesbian communities.^{[a]}

=== Other homosexual expressions ===
Many terms offensive to homosexuals imply spreading, e.g.: the use of wings to fly.

- bámbaro—used in the south of Colombia
- bugarrón/bufarrón/bujarrón/bujarra—used in the Dominican Republic, Puerto Rico and Spain. In Cuba, the expression "bugarrón y bugarra" refers to a "macho" man having sex with men. It is originated from French bougre and it is also cognate to "bugger" in English.
- bollera-used to refer to lesbians
- cabro—used in Peru
- cacorro—used in Colombia for denoting the active partner (the "top" during anal intercourse) in a gay relationship.
- culero used in El Salvador
- cueco—used in Panama
- cundango—used in the Dominican Republic and Cuba. In Cuba, cundango refers specifically to a male sex partner ("Tommy has been Robert's cundango for years"). It may mean "effeminate" or "sensitive" with a negative connotation
- cochón—used in Nicaragua
- cola (lit. ' tail')
- desviado (lit. ' deviant')
- fresa (lit. ' strawberry')—used in Mexico to mean "fag" and can also refer to people who are preppy or yuppy. For example, pinche fresa means "fucking fag."
- fran (lit. 'fran')-used to mean "gay".
- hueco (lit. ' hole hollow')—used in Guatemala. In Chile, depending on context, it can mean either "homosexual" or "vapid."
- invertido (lit. ' inverted'). A term ubiquitously used in old times to avoid the strong word "maricón". It was the official word used by the regime of Spanish dictator Francisco Franco in Spain, and sometimes still used in Cuba.
- joto (see below)
- loca (lit. ' crazy woman')—used in Puerto Rico and Cuba (where "loquita" and "loquísima" are commonly used as well). Although normally derogatory, this term is also used as a culturally appropriated term of endearment among male and female homosexuals. In Chile is used to refer to a flamboyant or very feminine gay man.
- macha (feminine form of macho)—refers to a "dyke". In Costa Rica, however, macho or macha is not derogatory but common slang for caucasoid, or similar to "blondie."
- mamapinga (lit. 'cock-sucker'). Extensively used in Cuba.
- mamaverga/mamavergas (lit. ' cock-sucker').
- maraco—used in Chile, only against male homosexuals; see maraca below.
- maraca—used in Chile, only against female homosexuals; see maraco above.
- mayate-used in Mexico to denote someone who is gay, or overtly flamboyant (lit. 'an iridescent beetle').^{[b]}
- mostacero (lit: "mustardman")—used derogatively in Peru, referring to the active partner in a gay relationship, as he covers his penis in feces (mostaza or "mustard") when sexually-penetrating his passive partner.
- muerdealmohadas (lit. ' pillow-biter')—used in Peru. In Spain, it denotes the passive partner of a gay relationship.
- pargo (lit. ' porgiesporgy' or 'red snapper fish')—used in Venezuela and Cuba, to mean "gay" or "flamboyant". This, as well as other fish in the grouper genera ("cherna" in Spanish) are used in Cuba as well.
- pájaro (lit. ' bird')—used in the Dominican Republic and Cuba; in the latter country, the feminine forms "pájara" and "pajaruca" are also used. In each case, the use is either affectionate or derogatory, depending on context.
- parchita (lit. 'passion fruit')-used derogatively in Venezuela, for someone who is gay.
- partido (or partí'o (lit:"broken one"; also "political party")—used derogatively in Cuba.
- pato (lit. ' duck')—used in Puerto Rico, Panama, Cuba and Venezuela. This word is probably related to the Latin pathus meaning "sexually receptive". In Cuba, by extension, other palmipedes's names are used to denote gayness: "oca" (greylag goose), "cisne" (swan), "ganso" (goose) and even "gaviota" (seagull). Also used in Colombia.
- pirobo/a—used in Colombia for denoting the passive partner in a gay relationship. However, much as marica, is often used to refer to someone. As in Vea ese pirobo ('Look at that dude')
- playo ("flat")—used in Costa Rica.
- plumífero (lit. 'feathered bird'). Common derogative use in Cuba.
- puto (see "puta" below) — a term that has caused controversy in fan chants during Mexican national team soccer matches.
- raro/rarito (lit. ' weird').
- soplanucas (lit. ' nape-blower')—used in Spain for denoting the active partner in a gay relationship.
- tortillera (lit. ' a female who makes tortillas')—one of the most common insults to lesbians. Lesbian sex is often referred to as tortillear or hacer tortilla ("to make a tortilla").
- parcha/parchita (corruption of "parga", a female pargo)
- sucia (lit. ' dirty woman')—used as an ironic term of endearment among male homosexuals.
- traba—short of trabuco used in Argentina.
- trolo—used in Argentina.
- trucha (lit. ' trout')
- trabuco—used in Peru and Argentina, referring to a transgender woman.
- tragaleche (lit. ' milk-swallower with milk as a metaphor for semen').
- tragasables (lit. ' sword-swallower').
- Other terms: afeminado, chivo, colizón, comilón, fleto, homo, homogay (combination of the English loanwords "homo" and "gay"), julandrón, julai (shortened form of julandrón), plon, plumón, puñal, rosquete, sarasa, roscón, et cetera.
- In Cuba, bombero (firefighter), capitán (captain), general (general) and other military (male) grades showing masculinity are used as slurs against lesbians, painting them with an un-feminine, dykelike appearance.

With Spanish being a grammatically gendered language, one's sexuality can be challenged with a gender-inappropriate adjective, much as in English one might refer to a flamboyant man or a transgender man as her. Some words referring to a male homosexual end in an "a" but have the masculine article "el"—a deliberate grammatical violation. For example, although maricona refers to females, it may also be used as a compounded offensive remark towards a homosexual male, and vice versa.

== Attacks against one's character ==
=== Chocho ===
Chocho means literally a senile person, from the verb chochear.

=== Pendejo ===
Pendejo (according to the Diccionario de la lengua española de la Real Academia Española, lit. 'a pubic hair'^{[c]}), according to the Chicano poet José Antonio Burciaga, "basically describes someone who is stupid or does something stupid."^{[c]} Burciaga said that the word is often used while not in polite conversation.^{[c]} It may be translated as "dumbass" or "asshole" in many situations, though it carries an extra implication of willful incompetence or innocent gullibility that is ripe for others to exploit. The less extreme meaning, which is used in most Spanish-speaking countries, translates more or less as "jackass". The term, however, has highly offensive connotations in Puerto Rico. An older usage was in reference to a man who is in denial about being cheated (for example, by his wife).^{[a]} Burciaga said that pendejo "is probably the least offensive" of the various Spanish profanity words beginning with "p" but that calling someone a pendejo is "stronger" than calling someone estúpido.^{[c]} Burciaga said, "Among friends it can be taken lightly, but for others it is better to be angry enough to back it up."^{[c]}

In Mexico, pendejo most commonly refers to a "fool", "idiot", or "asshole". In Mexico, there are many proverbs that refer to pendejos.^{[c]} In Peru, it means a person who is opportunistic in an immoral or deceptively persuasive manner (usually involving sexual gain and promiscuity but not limited to it), and if used referring to a female (ella es pendeja), it means she is promiscuous (or perhaps a swindler). There the word pendejada and a whole family of related words have meanings that stem from these.^{[a]} In South America, pendejo is also a vulgar, yet inoffensive, word for children. It also signifies a person with a disorderly or irregular life. In Argentina, pendejo (or pendeja for females) is a pejorative way of saying pibe. The word, in Chile, Colombia, and El Salvador, can refer to a cocaine dealer, or it can refer to a "fool".^{[c]}

In Puerto Rico and the Dominican Republic, it has different meanings depending on the situation. It can range from ¡Te cogieron de pendejo! ("You were swindled!") to ¡Qué tipa pendeja! ("What a dumbass!" as when a strange woman behaves offensively and then suddenly leaves). In Mexico and some countries in Central America, especially El Salvador, una pendejada/pendeja is used to describe something incredibly stupid that someone has done.^{[a]} In many regions, especially in Cuba, pendejo also means "coward" (with a stronger connotation), as in ¡No huyas, pendejo! ("Don't run away, chicken-shit!") or No seas pendejo! ("Don't be such a coward!").^{[a]}

In South America, it refers to a person regarded with an obnoxiously determined advancement of one's own personality, wishes, or views (a "smartass").^{[a]} In Argentina, Chile, and Uruguay, pendejo or pendeja refers to a child, usually with a negative connotation, like that of immaturity or a "brat". Also in Argentina, since pendejo literally means "pubic hair", it usually refers to someone of little to no social value.^{[a]} In Peru, however, it does not necessarily have a negative connotation and can just refer to someone who is clever and street-smart.^{[a]} In the Philippines, it is usually used to refer to a man whose wife or partner is cheating on him (i.e. a cuckold). In North Sulawesi, Indonesia, pendo (a derivative of pendejo) is used as profanity but with the majority of the population not knowing its meaning. The word was adopted during the colonial era when Spanish and Portuguese merchants sailed to this northern tip of Indonesia for spices.^{[a]} In the American film Idiocracy, Joe Bauers's idiot lawyer is named Frito Pendejo. Burciaga says that the Yiddish word putz "means the same thing" as pendejo.^{[c]}

=== Cabrón ===
Cabrón (lit. ' big goat' or 'stubborn goat'), in the primitive sense of the word, is an adult male goat (cabra for an adult female goat) and is not offensive in Spain. It is also used as an insult, based on an old usage similar to that of pendejo, namely, to imply that the subject is stubborn or in denial about being cheated on, hence the man has "horns" like a goat (extremely insulting).^{[a]} The word is offensive in Mexico, Cuba, and Puerto Rico, as it means "asshole" and other insults in English. In Mexico, cabrón refers to a man whose wife cheats on him without protest from him, or even with his encouragement.

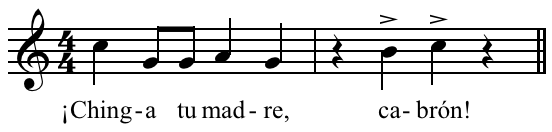
"¡Chinga tu madre, cabrón!" in C major..

The seven-note musical flourish known as "Shave and a Haircut (Two Bits)", commonly played on car horns, is associated with the seven-syllable phrase ¡Chinga tu madre, cabrón! (Go fuck your mother, asshole!). Playing the jingle on a car horn can result in a hefty fine for traffic violation if done in the presence of police or road rage if aimed at another driver or a pedestrian.

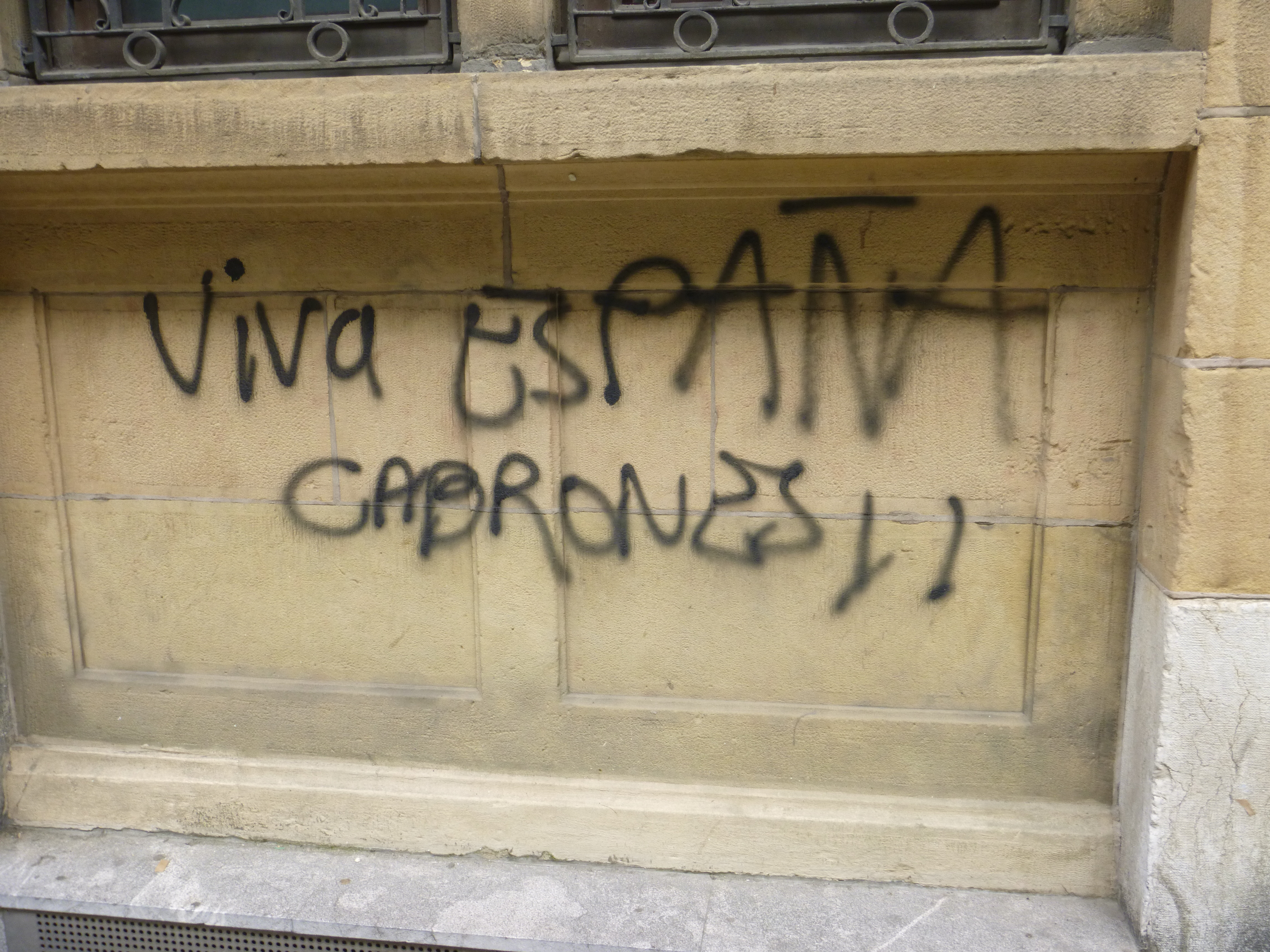
"Viva España, cabrones!!" graffiti

The expression ¡Ah cabrón! is used sometimes when one is shocked/surprised by something. Among close friends, the term is often inoffensive; however, it is not a word to be used casually with strangers. As an adjective, it is equivalent to "tough" as in "It is tough" (Está cabrón). To some extent, it can also be used with an ironically positive connotation meaning "great", "amazing", "phenomenal", or "badass". Such expressions would be said as ¡Estás cabrón! or ¡Yo soy cabrón!. The word is quite flexibly used in Puerto Rico, and it can even have completely opposite meanings depending on the context. Best friends call each other cabrón in a friendly manner, while it may also be used in an offensive manner. One might say Está cabrón to describe something as very good or very bad depending on the circumstance.

In Panama, it is used as an adjective to mean something/someone very annoying (who pisses you off). The verb cabrear can mean "to piss off (someone)". This verb form is also used in Chile. In Peru, cabro is a reference to a homosexual, hence cabrón is a superlative form ("big faggot"/"flaming faggot"). The term cabrón also means a handler of prostitutes, comparable to "pimp" in English.

=== Chulo ===
The most common way to refer to a pimp in Spanish is by using the term chulo as a noun. In some countries, chulo can be used as an adjective somewhat equivalent to "cool" (Ese hombre es un chulo = "That man is a pimp" versus Ese libro es chulo = "That book is cool"). The word chula is a completely benign reference to an adorable female or feminine object, as in "¡Ay, que chula!". In Chile, however, "chulo" and "chula" always mean "vulgar".

=== Gilipollas ===
Gilipollas (and rarely gilipolla) is a term used mostly in Spain and lacking an exact translation to English; the most frequent equivalents when translated in books, films, and other media are "jerk", "jackass", "douchebag", "asshole", or "buffoon" (in English), con (in French), and boludo or pendejo.^{[a]} The canonical definition of a gilipollas is a person whose behavior, speech, outlook or general demeanor is inconsistent with the actual or potential consequences of their own intellectual inadequacy. Paragons of this taxon include stupid people unaware of their own stupidity or unwilling to accept the consequences thereof, people with an ostensible lack of self-criticism, people unable to realize their own limitations, people who engage in repeated self-defeating behavior, and even a category which is seldom captured in languages other than European Spanish—to wit, people characterized by self-aware idiocy or incompetence, with this self-awareness occasionally stressed to the point of (presumably futile) complacency.^{[a]} By extension, its use in daily life is dedicated to any of the following types of people:

- stupidity in its own right, to the point of eliciting animosity, whether faked or real, in whoever uses the word;
- any character flaw (e.g., obnoxiousness, impertinence, general unpleasantness, blatantly unjustified arrogance or obliqueness and even neurotic or passive-aggressive behavior) deemed irritating and even a catalyst for potentially detrimental situations; or
- a person displaying any combination of the two above qualities.

Occasionally it may be used for people who appear to be unpleasant or stupid (without necessarily being either) out of extreme social ineptitude.^{[a]} When selecting a word denoting low intelligence, most Spanish speakers have three options:

- using a merely descriptive term, or one which, although insulting, can be used as a mild or at times even affectionate form of teasing: tonto ("silly"), burro (lit. ' donkey'), etc.
- using a more explicitly insulting expression, although one which still does not qualify as a real profanity: imbécil, idiota, estúpido.
- one which delves into profanity. Gilipollas and capullo would correspond to such case.

The etymology of the word itself immediately confirms its genuinely Peninsular Spanish origins and preponderance, as opposed to other profanities perhaps more linked to Latin America: it is the combination of the Caló jili, usually translated as "candid", "silly" or "idiot", and a word which according to different sources is either polla (listed above) or a colloquial evolution thereto of the Latin pulla (bladder). Perhaps due to the alternative origins of the latter part of the word, there has been some controversy concerning its status as a real profanity, although its clear phonetic evocation of the word polla leaves little room for doubt, at least in its common daily use. It is due to this that attempts at a euphemism have at times become popular, as is the case with gilipuertas (puerta standing for door). Recently, similar phrases have appeared, especially in Spain, although most of them (such as soplapollas, "cock-blower") delve much further into plain profanity.

A usual derivation of the word gilipollas into an adjective form (or a false adjectival participle) is agilipollado/agilipollada. For example: … está agilipollado/a would mean "… is behaving like a gilipollas." Regardless of whether or not such condition or irreversible, the verb estar is always used, as opposed to ser. Another Spanish construction with similar rationale is atontado, derived from tonto ("silly"). A noun form of the word is gilipollez, meaning "stupidity" or "nonsense."

=== Capullo ===
Capullo (lit: "cocoon" or "flower bud", also slang for glans penis) is nearly always interchangeable with that of gilipollas.^{[a]} The main difference between the two of them is that while a gilipollas normally behaves as he does out of sheer stupidity, a capullo normally acts like one by applying certain amount of evil intentions to his acts. While one can act like a gilipollas without being one, in the capullo instance that is not possible. A near-exact English translation is wanker. In English to be means at the same time both the permanent/ fundamental characteristics and the non-permanent/ circumstantial ones of anything, in Spanish to be separates into two distinct verbs: ser and estar which respectively reflect the aforementioned characteristics. So, to say about anyone that es un gilipollas means that he is stupid/ annoying permanently, while to say está agilipollado reflects both his present state and the fact that it could change at any time to a non agilipollado one. This is not true for a capullo: if someone thinks about someone else that he is a capullo, he thinks so permanently, because the degree of evil he sees in the capullo's actions tends to be thought of as a permanent characteristic, inherent to the capullo's personality. So the correspondent verb ser would be used: es un capullo, and the estar verb would never be used.

Whenever used as an affectionate or heavily informal form of teasing rather than as an insult, though, capullo is used a bit more often. This may be because someone who does not have an intention to offend will resort to a lower amount of syllables, hence rendering the expression less coarse and ill-sounding. Therefore, expressions such as venga ya, no seas ___ ("come on, don't be silly") would use capullo more frequently than gilipollas.^{[a]}

=== Buey/huey/güey/wey/we/way ===
Buey/Huey/Güey/Wey/We is a common term in Mexico, coming from the word buey that literally means "ox" or "steer". It means "stupid" or a "cheated husband/boyfriend/cuckold".^{[a]} It can be used as a less offensive substitute for cabrón when used among close friends. Mexican teenagers and young Chicano men use this word routinely in referring to one another, similar to "dude" in English. Vato is the older Mexican word for this.

=== Joto ===
Joto (lit. 'jay, as the letter J' or 'jack, from playing cards') is a slang term in Mexican Spanish and other Latin American varieties of Spanish. It is primarily used as a derogatory word for gay men, though its meanings and cultural significance have varied over time. The term has been documented since the late 19th century and remains widely recognized in colloquial usage.

The origin of the word is uncertain. One proposed etymology links it to the Nahuatl word xôtoj, meaning homosexual. Another explanation suggests a connection to the Spanish word jota ("J"), possibly through its association with the jack and wildcard in card games. A widely circulated account attributes it to Mexico City's Lecumberri prison (1900–1976), where inmates in cellblock J (jota) were allegedly homosexual men. This theory is disputed, as the term appears in written sources as early as 1885, predating the prison.

The term emerged in Mexican Spanish during the late 19th century, reflecting prevailing social stigmas toward homosexuality, particularly during the Porfirio Díaz era (1876–1911), when same-sex relations were criminalized and socially condemned. Its association with prisons further underscored the marginalization of queer individuals in institutional and cultural contexts. Over time, joto became embedded in literature, media, and everyday speech, often reinforcing stereotypes linked to machismo in Latin American societies. Since the late 20th century, joto and the derived noun term jotería have been reappropriated within the Mexican LGBTQ+ community.

=== Madre ===
Madre, (mother) depending on its usage (for example: madrear—"to beat" or hasta la madre—"full"), is an insult to one's mother. This dishonors her, and the reputation of the family. It can be profane in Mexico. Chinga tu madre ("Fuck your mother") is considered to be extremely offensive.^{[a]} Tu madre culo ("Your mother's ass") combines two Spanish profanity words, madre and culo (see above), to create an offensive jab at one's mother or mother-in-law. Madre could be used to reference objects, like ¡Qué poca madre! ("That's terrible!") and Este madre no funciona ("This shit doesn't work"). It can also be used with an ironically positive connotation, as in ¡Está de poca/puta madre! ("It's fucking awesome!"). Madrazo, in Colombia, refers to insults in general, and echar madrazos means "to insult/curse somebody out." Puta madre can also be used to insult someone ("motherfucker"), as well as to describe something of great excitement ("the shit", "awesome") as mentioned before.

=== Pinche ===
Pinche has different meanings, depending on geographic location. The word is not offensive in Spain and it mostly refers to a kitchen scullion, who acts as an assistant to chefs and is assigned to menial kitchen tasks such as preparing ingredients and utensils, though it may also extend to bussing staff and dishwashers. Many restaurants in Spain have the name "El Pinche", to the great amusement of Mexican and Chicano tourists.

In Mexico, the saying can range anywhere from semi-inappropriate to very offensive depending on tone and context. It can be used as an insult, as in pinche güey ("loser"), or to describe an object of poor quality, está muy pinche ("It really sucks"). Furthermore, it is often equivalent to the English terms "damn", "freakin'", "bloody" or "fuckin'", as in estos pinches aguacates están podridos… ("These damn avocados are rotten…"); Pinche Mario ya no ha venido… ("Freakin' Mario hasn't come yet"); or ¿¡Quieres callarte la pinche boca!? ("Would you like to shut your fuckin' mouth?"), but most likely should be translated to the euphemism "frickin'" in most situations. Therefore, it can be said in front of adults, but possibly not children, depending on one's scruples. Sometimes pinchudo(a) is said instead. It also refers to a mean-spirited person or someone who is stingy: "Él es muy pinche." ("He is very stingy.")..

In Chile, the noun pinche is not vulgar, and it refers to the people involved in an informal romantic relationship with each other. The verbal form pinchar can be translated as "kissing" or "make out". Pinchar also means "to ping" (the act of calling someone and then hanging up with the intent of having them call back). The adjective pinche has seen a rise in usage, as a "lightly vulgar" form of the "puta" adjective: "La pinche inspectora." instead of "La puta inspectora." ("That darn inspector." instead of "That fucking inspector."). In Puerto Rico, pinche simply refers to a hairpin, while pincho has the same meaning in Dominican Spanish.

=== Puta ===
Puta literally means whore, and can be extended to any woman who is sexually promiscuous. This word is common to all other Romance languages (it is puta also in Portuguese and Catalan, pute/putain in French, puttana in Italian, and so on) and almost certainly comes from the Vulgar Latin putta (from puttus, alteration of putus "boy"), although the Royal Spanish Academy lists its origins as "uncertain" (unlike other dictionaries, such as the María Moliner, which state putta as its origin). It is a derogatory way to refer to a prostitute, while the formal Spanish word for a prostitute is prostituta. It is used similarly to the English word bitch.

== Racial and ethnic derogatives ==
- Word endings such as -aco, -arro, -azo, -ito or (in Spain) -ata are used to confer a falsely augmentative or diminutive, usually derogative quality to different racial and cultural denominations: e.g. negrata or negraco (and, with a more condescending and less aggressive demeanor, negrito) are the usual Spanish translations for a black person. Moraco would be the translation for "raghead" or "camel jockey".^{[a]} ^{[b]}
- Sudaca, in spite of its etymology (sudamericano, "South American"), is a derogative term used in Spain for all Latin Americans, South American, Caribbean, or Central American in origin. In Mexico, the term is solely used to refer to people from South America.^{[b]}
- Frijolero is the most commonly used Spanish word for beaner and is particularly offensive when used by a non-Mexican person towards a Mexican in the southwestern United States.^{[b]}
- Gabacho, in Spain, is used as a derisive term for French people—and, by extension, any French-speaking individual. Among Latin American speakers, however, it is meant as a usually offensive term for white people or people born in the United States, no matter their race.^{[b]}
- Similarly, musiu—A (somewhat outdated) word used in parts of Colombia and Venezuela, used to denote a white foreigner. Stems from the contemporary pronunciation of the French word "Monsieur". Now generally superseded among younger Venezuelans by the term below.^{[b]}
- Argentuzo, argentucho an offensive term used in Chile and some Latin American countries to refer to an Argentine.^{[b]}
- Brazuca, used in Argentina to refer to Brazilians.
- Bolita, an offensive term used in Argentina to refer to Bolivians.
- Cabecita negra (lit. ' little black head'), used before as a very offensive and racist insult against Peronists, but it is used in Argentina to refer their border country, like Paraguay, Peru and Bolivia; since they were mainly workers during Peronism's rise.
- Chilote – this is actually the demonym for the people of the Chiloé archipelago in Chile. However, in Argentina it is used as a synecdoche, referring to all Chileans.^{[b]}
- Cholo, was used in reference to people of actual or perceived mestizo or indigenous background. Not always offensive. In Chile it is used to refer to a Peruvian. In Peru it is used to refer to someone from the more purely indigenous population or someone who looks very indigenous. When used in the more mixed coastal areas to describe someone, it can be slightly more offensive depending on the way it is said or the context. In Mexico and the United States the term is usually used to refer to a Chicano gang member.
- Coño, offensive word used to denote a Spaniard or the Castilian dialect in Chile.^{[b]}
- Ignorante outdated offense used by Chileans, Colombians, Mexicans and Paraguayans to describe Argentines. The word "argentino" (Argentine) is an anagram for "ignorante" (ignorant) in Spanish.^{[b]}
- Kurepí used by Paraguayans to describe Argentines. Literally translated from Guarani, meaning pig skin.^{[b]}
- Mayate (lit: June bug) is a very offensive term used in Mexico and primarily by Mexican-Americans to describe a black person or an African-American.^{[b]}
- Mono (lit:monkey) used in reference to Ecuadorians in Peru^{[b]}
- Gallina (lit:chicken; coward) used in Ecuador to describe Peruvians.
- Pachuco refers to a subculture of Chicanos and Mexican-Americans, associated with zoot suits, street gangs, nightlife, and flamboyant public behavior.
- Paragua (lit. ' umbrella'), used in Argentina to refer to Paraguayans.^{[b]}
- Pinacate (lit. ' dung beetle')-mostly used by Mexicans or Mexican-Americans referring to dark-skinned or black individuals, similar to English "blackie".^{[b]}
- Gachupín is used in Mexico and Central American countries for Spaniards established in those countries.^{[b]}
- Gringo – generally used in most Spanish-speaking (and Portuguese-speaking) countries in Latin America. It denotes a person from the United States, or, by extension, from any English-speaking country or even anyone with a Northern European phenotype.^{[b]}
- Gaucho - term used in Mexico as a demonym to refer to Argentines and Uruguayans.
- Panchito is used in Spain for Latin Americans with an Amerindian appearance. It is used mostly as a derogatory term.^{[b]}
- Payoponi is a Caló word widely used in Spain referring to native looking Central and South Americans. It is composed by payo (lit. 'non-Romani person') and poni (lit. 'pony due to their average height').^{[b]}
- llanta (lit. 'tire') general prison slang used by Mexicans or Mexican-Americans referring to very dark-skinned individuals.^{[b]}
- Prieto Used to describe dark people.^{[b]}
- Roto, used in Peru, Bolivia and Argentina to refer to Chileans.^{[b]}
- Yorugua, mild word used in Argentina to refer to Uruguayans. (Uruguayo in vesre).^{[b]}
- Japo used in reference to people of Japanese ancestry, similar to Jap; used mostly in Spain. In Rioplatense Spanish slang, the word used is Ponja, which is vesre for Japón (Japan).^{[b]}
- Moro (lit. 'Moor') used in Spain in reference to people of Maghrebi, Arab or Middle Eastern ancestry; also used to describe Muslims in general.^{[b]}
- Mexinarco used in the rest of Latin American countries to refer to Mexicans, a portmanteau of the demonym mexicano (Mexican) narcotraficante (drug trafficker), in reference to the fairly recent phenomenon of the Mexican drug war.
- Polaco (lit. ' Polish person') used in Spain in reference to Catalan people. Its origin is unclear.^{[b]}
- Maqueto (Basque: Maketo), used in the Basque Country in reference to Spanish immigrants and descendants of Spanish immigrants with origins outside the Basque Country.^{[b]}
- Charnego (Catalan: Xarnego), used in Catalonia in reference to Spanish immigrants and descendants of Spanish immigrants with origins outside Catalonia.^{[b]}
- Tano (from Napolitano: Neapolitan). Used in Argentina, Uruguay and Paraguay as a synecdoche, to refer to an Italian. Not offensive in the present-day context.^{[b]}
- Turco (lit. 'Turkish') used in Chile and Argentina for people of Arab ancestry. Originated due to the Ottoman nationality that early Palestinian, Lebanese and Syrian immigrants had on their passports.
- Pirata (lit. 'Pirate'). Used in Argentina to refer to English people.^{[b]}
- Paqui (lit. 'Paki'), Used to describe people of Subcontinental Asian heritage. Supposedly inoffensive, but not used by native Spaniards in front of people they are slurring. Therefore, used as a racist epithet. In Argentina, the term has a distinct, unrelated meaning. Within the country's LGBT community, paqui (also spelled paki) is used as a pejorative slang term for heterosexual people.
- Yanacona a term used by modern Mapuche as an insult for Mapuches considered to be subservient to non-indigenous Chileans, 'sellout'.
- Yanqui (lit. ' Yankee'), Used in Argentina and other places in Latin America to refer to a US American. Sometimes, but not always, derogatory. Usually used to distinguish a US American from a foreigner of a culturally similar country such as Canada or the UK.
- Saltamuros (lit. ' wall jumper'), joking insult used in the US and some Latin American countries, like Guatemala and Chile to refer to Mexicans who enter the US illegally, making allusions to the border wall.
- Surumato Used in New Mexico to refer to Mexicans, particularly immigrants.
- Veneco Used in all Latin American countries to refer to Venezuelans.

== Other terms ==
- chucha—used in parts of Colombia, Ecuador, and Peru in reference to offensive body odor.
- jiñar—"to shit" in Spain slang.
- popola—term for the female genitalia in Dominican Republic slang.
- so—used to imply "such a …" but not always capable of direct translation in English. For example: "¡Cállate, so puta!" ("Shut up, you bitch!")
- toto—in Cuba, the Dominican Republic, Puerto Rico, and Spain, this term is used to describe a woman's vulva or someone who's a coward.
- vaina (lit. ' sheath' or 'pod of Lat vagina')—in Colombia, the Dominican Republic, Ecuador, Panama, Peru, Puerto Rico, and Venezuela, a commonly used generic filler. For example: Esta vaina se dañó ("This thing broke down").

It can also be used in phrases to denote any strong emotion. For example: ¡Vea la vaina!, can mean "Isn't that something!" (expressing discontent or surprise). Esa vaina quedó muy bien (lit. ' That vaina came up really well') would translate to "It turned out really well" (expressing rejoice or happiness) and … y toda esa vaina would translate to "… and all that crap".
In the Dominican Republic it is commonly used in combination with other profanities to express anger or discontent. For example: "¡Qué maldita vaina, coñazo!" meaning "Fuck, that's bullshit!" or "¡Vaina'el diablo coño!" which translates as "Damn, (this) thing (is) of the devil!" but would be used to refer to a situation as "fucking shit".

In the Spanish region of La Mancha, the formation of neologisms is very common to refer with humoristic sense to a certain way of being some people, by the union of two terms, usually a verb and a noun. E.g., capaliendres (lit. 'person who geld nits', "miser", "niggard"), (d)esgarracolchas (lit. 'person who rends quilts', "awkward", "untrustworthy"), pisacristos (lit. 'person who tramples Christs'—"blasphemous person"), and much more.

== See also ==
- Albur
- La Malinche
- Latin profanity
- List of Puerto Rican slang words and phrases
- Profanity filter
