= La chingada =

Mexican Spanish slang

La chingada is a term commonly used in colloquial, even crass, Mexican Spanish that refers to various conditions or situations of, generally, negative connotations. The word is derived from the verb chingar, "to fuck".

The concept of "la chingada" has been famously analysed by Octavio Paz in his book The Labyrinth of Solitude.

== Spanish uses of the expression ==
The following list of expressions featuring "la chingada" appear in Gómez de Silva's Diccionario breve de mexicanismos (2001):

- Estar dado a la chingada: "to be given to la chingada," that is, ruined, that you have lost everything.
- Estar de la chingada: to be somehow too bad, difficult, or complicated.
- Ir hecho la chingada: to go lightning-fast.
- Ir a la chingada: "to go to la chingada," or to go away upset, to go fuck yourself.
- Irse algo a la chingada: to break or damage something, something "going away to la chingada".
- Llevárselo a alguien la chingada: to be angry, or in a tight spot.
- Hijo de tu chingada madre: "you son of your fucking mother" or "hijo de tu puta madre" (literally: son of your whore mother) meaning "you son of a whore" and also "hijo-esu (hijo de su) puta madre" is similar to saying "son of a bitch" in general. Hijo de su chingada madre can be idiomatically translated as "Son of your fucking mom" (madre means mother).
- Mandar a alguien a la chingada: "send someone to la chingada," which means saying goodbye with disdain or annoyance to someone who is bothersome.
- ¡Me lleva la chingada!: "I'm fucked!", exclamation of protest that is used to give vent to anger, when adversity is experienced, or surprise; euphemistic forms are: ¡me lleva la fregada!, la tía de las muchachas —the aunt of the girls—,la que se cayó por asomarse —the one that fell because peeked—, la tiznada —the begrimed—, la tostada —the toast, the tan one—, la trampa —the trap—, el tren —the train—, la tristeza —the sadness—, la trompada —the slap—, la verga —the dick.
- Vete a la chingada: "Fuck off!" or "go to hell"
- Tu chingada madre: "you motherfucker", or also like: "your fucked mother".
