= LGBTQ people in Mexico =

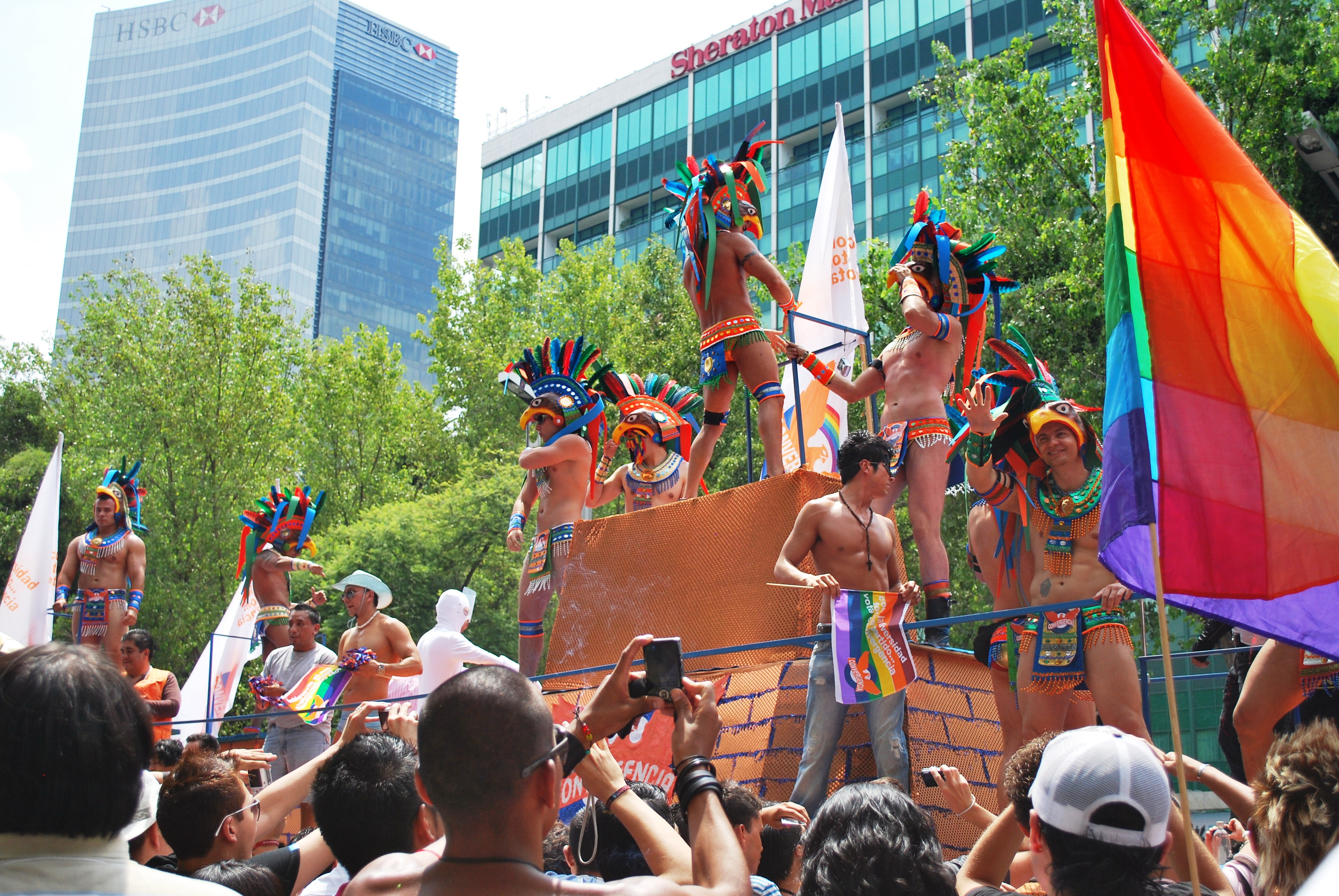
Float with Aztec Eagle Warrior theme at the 2009 LGBT Pride Parade in Mexico City.

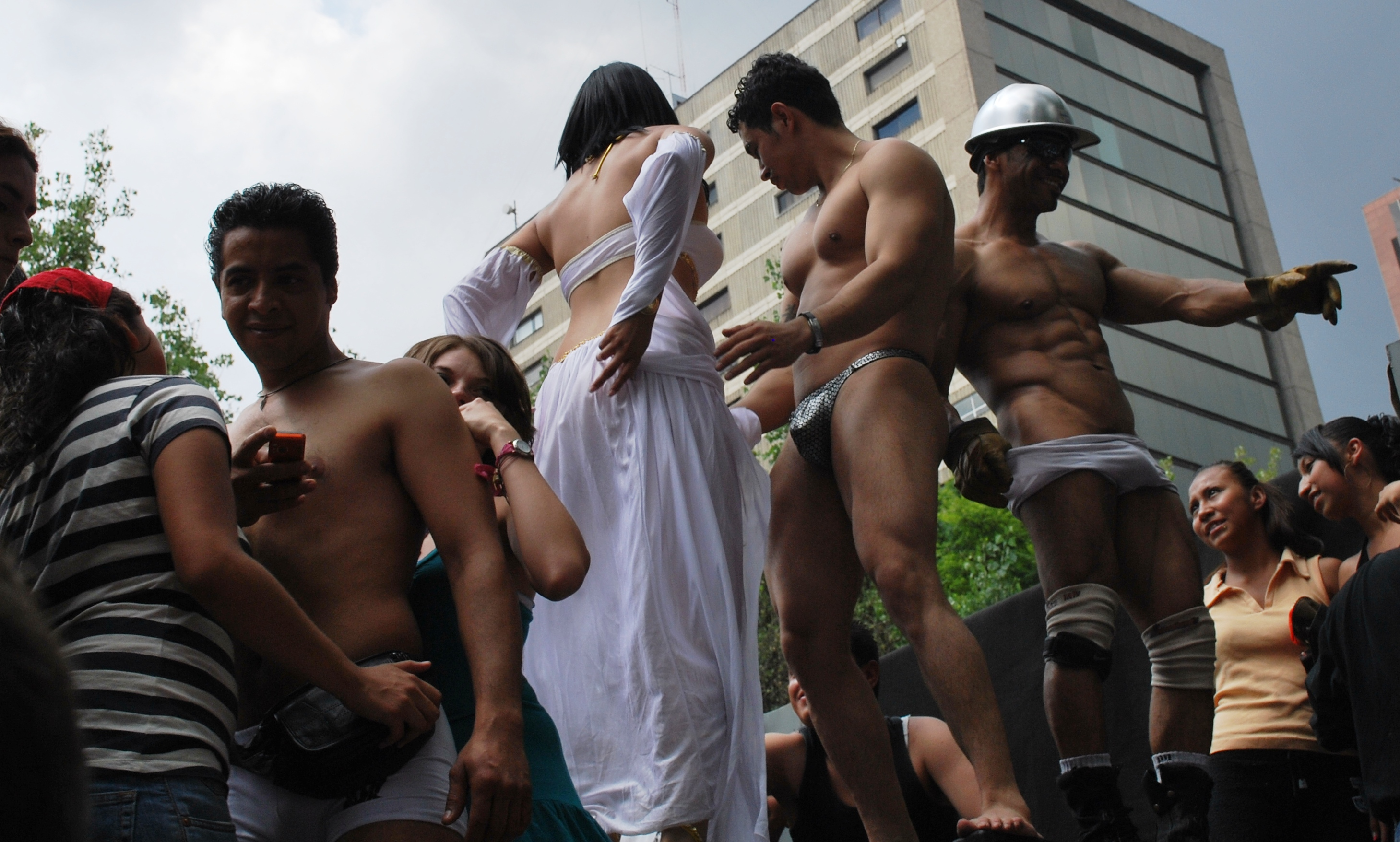
Go-go dancers at the 2009 LGBT Pride Parade in Mexico City.

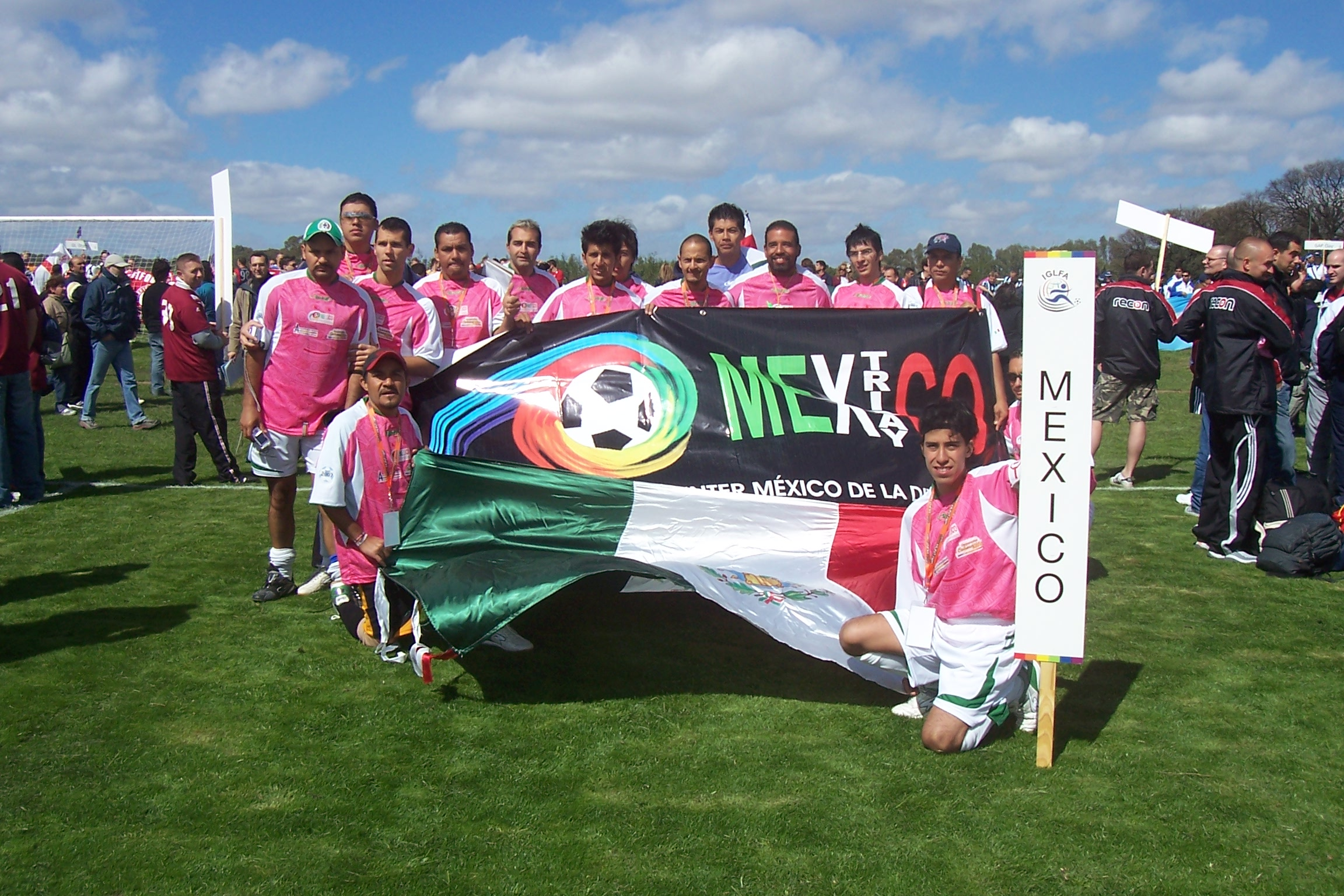
Mexican gay soccer team, known as El Tri Gay, at the 2007 International Gay and Lesbian Football Association tournament in Buenos Aires, Argentina.

The history of LGBTQ people in Mexico dates back to pre-Columbian times.

== History ==
The history of LGBTQ people in Mexico can be divided into three separate periods, coinciding with the three main periods of Mexican history: pre-Columbian, colonial, and post-independence. The data on the pre-Columbian people and those of the period of colonization is scarce and obscure. Historians often described the indigenous customs that surprised them or that they disapproved of, but tended to take a position of accusation or apology, which makes it impossible to distinguish between reality and propaganda. In general, it seems that the Mexica were as homophobic as the Spanish, and that other Indigenous peoples tended to be much more tolerant, to the point of honoring Two-Spirit people as shamans. The history of LGBTQ people in the colonial period and after independence is still in great part yet to be studied, but include the 1658 executions for sodomites and the 1901 Dance of the Forty-One, two great scandals in Mexican public life.

== Community and culture ==
The visible center of the LGBT community is the Zona Rosa, a series of streets in Colonia Juárez in Mexico City, where over 50 gay bars and dance clubs exist. Surrounding the country's capital, there is a sizable amount in the State of Mexico. Some observers claim that gay life is more developed in Mexico's largest western city, Guadalajara. Other large cities include border city Tijuana, northern city Monterrey, centrist cities Puebla and León, and major port city Veracruz. The popularity of gay tourism, especially in Puerto Vallarta, Cancún, and elsewhere, has also brought more national attention to the presence of homosexuality in Mexico. Among some young, urban heterosexuals, it has become popular to attend gay dance clubs and to have openly gay friends.

Since mid-2007, the government of the Federal District and Cuauhtémoc, D.F. — in whose territory the Zona Rosa is found — have placed operatives in some seedy nightclubs of the Zona Rosa, with the purpose of freeing this tourist zone of problems such as illegal drug trade and prostitution, as well as reducing the incidence of crimes such as theft. Other targets of the program are those sites of cohabitation that lack safety measures for the users — mainly emergency exits. LGBT groups have denounced the action as a form of homophobia.

=== Pride ===
In 1979, the country's first LGBT Pride Parade, also known as LGBT Pride March, was held and attended by over one thousand people in Mexico City. Ever since, it has been held every June without interruption under different slogans with the aim of bringing visibility to sexual minorities, encouraging consciousness about AIDS and HIV, denouncing homophobia, and demanding the creation of public policies such as the recognition of same-sex civil unions and same-sex marriages and the legalization of LGBTQ adoption, among others.

According to organizers, in its latest edition, the XXXI LGBT Pride Parade was attended by over 350,000 people, 100,000 more than its predecessor. In 2003, the first Lesbian Pride March occurred in the country's capital. In Guadalajara, well-attended LGBT Pride Parades have been held also every June since 1996. LGBT Pride Parades have continuously occurred in Monterrey, Tijuana, Puebla, Veracruz, Xalapa, Cuernavaca, Tuxtla Gutiérrez, Acapulco, Puerto Vallarta, Chilpancingo, and Mérida.

=== Economy ===
The pink market (called "LGBT market", or mercado rosa) in Mexico is calculated at 51,300 million pesos (some US$3,891 million). The group of LGBT consumers, ignored until the present out of homophobia or fear of critics, is being discovered. In 2005 the Gay Expo in Mexico was created, which claimed to know the companies and services of the LGBT community, and the companies of the division have been united into the Union of Companies and Service Providers to the Lesbian, Gay, Bisexual, and Transgender Community (Unegay).

A study by the agency De la Riva on the behavior of the LGBT consumer shows that the habits of gay men and lesbians are distinct. While gay men prefer brand names and a riskier lifestyle, lesbians tend to be educated and don't tend to pay attention to brand names. Gays respond to advertisements that make knowing winks to the community but reject advertisements with openly gay themes because they fear being identified through the product.

=== Tourism ===
Pink tourism, especially from the US, has one of its favorite destinations in Mexico, and especially Puerto Vallarta, where it is even possible to see men taking a walk hand in hand in the Zona Romántica. Another favorite destination is Cancún, which has tried to attract the LGBT public with events like the Cancún Mayan Riviera Gay Fall Fiesta and the Cancún International Gay Festival. LGBT tourism focuses not on sun, beaches, and Mayan ruins; it is more diverse. For this public there exist two specialized travel agencies, Opta Tours (since 1991) and Babylon Tours.

Guadalajara and Acapulco were common vacation destinations for gay men and lesbians from Mexico City and, especially, the United States and Canada in the 1980s and 1990s. Since that time, Puerto Vallarta has developed into Mexico's premier resort town as a sort of satellite gay space for its big sister Guadalajara, much as Fire Island is to New York City and Palm Springs is to Los Angeles. Puerto Vallarta is now considered the most welcoming and gay-friendly destination in the country, dubbed the "San Francisco of Mexico." It boasts a gay scene, centered in the Zona Romántica, of hotels and resorts as well as many bars, nightclubs and a gay beach on the main shore. Puerto Vallarta has been cited as the number one gay beach destination in Latin America.

=== Sport ===
The Mexican gay soccer team, known as El Tri Gay, is the first of its kind in the country. Team member Eduardo Velázquez was quoted saying,

Maybe we are not the best, maybe we are, no one knows. But we are the first to go and the first who dare to form a team with courage, heart, strength and enthusiasm, and we are determined to represent Mexico diligently. We hope to abolish the belief that the Mexican gay community is always found in nightclubs, drinking, looking for sex and consuming drugs.

In 2007, Mexico participated for the first time in the Gay World Cup, which was held in Buenos Aires, Argentina. However, according to team members, they have been discriminated against by Mexican official soccer organizations, such as the Mexican Football Federation (FMF) and the National Commission for Physical Culture and Sports (CONADE), that have refused to support them because the Gay World Cup is not recognized by FIFA. The team also participated in the 2008 Gay World Cup held in London, UK, and in the 2009 World Outgames held in Copenhagen, Denmark. The team fully participated in the AIDS Healthcare Foundation (AHF) "LOVE Condoms Campaign", all getting publicly tested.

== Rights ==
Equality of same-sex marriage in Mexican states Legal equality of marriages of same-sex and opposite-sex couples Marriage licenses are issued to same-sex couples despite not being allowed under state law; they may take more time to process or be more expensive than licenses for opposite-sex couples Inequality of marriage: married same-sex couples do not legally qualify as married when it comes to the adoption of children, though adoptions may be allowed regardless.

The LGBTQ community has been gaining some rights in the first years of the 21st century. On 29 April 2003, the Federal Law to Prevent and Eliminate Discrimination was passed. The law, which has been criticized as insufficient, gives rise to the creation of the National Council to Prevent Discrimination (Consejo Nacional para Prevenir la Discriminación, CONAPRED), which is in charge of receiving and settling cases of discrimination, as well as "develop[ing] actions to protect all citizens from every distinction or exclusion based on ethnic or national origin, sex, age, disability, social or economic condition, conditions of health, pregnancy, language, religion, beliefs, sexual preferences, marital status or any other, that prevents or annuls the acknowledgement or the exercise of the rights and the real equality of opportunities of persons".

In November 2006, the Law for Coexistence Partnerships was enacted in the Federal District. Called "gay law" in the mass media, this legal arrangement is not orientated exclusively to the homosexual population. The law, in effect since its publication in the official newspaper of the capital city government on 16 March 2007, gives almost the same rights as a married couple within the limits of the Federal District, with the exception of adoption.

The first Mexican state to legalize same-sex civil unions was Coahuila on 11 January 2007, under the name of "civil solidarity agreement". The Coahuilan congress modified the civil code to introduce the new form of cohabitation. The law allows similar rights to marriage but prohibits adoption by same-sex couples. On March 4, 2010, Mexico City's law allowing same-sex marriage took effect, despite an appeal by the Attorney-General of the Republic, making Mexico the first Latin American country to allow same-sex marriage by non-judicial means. On 12 March 2010, Mexico City held its first same-sex wedding, which will be recognized throughout the Mexican territory.

In spite of these advances, in 2006, the Mexican population was primarily against same-sex marriage. In a survey by Parametría, 61% of those surveyed responded "no" when asked if they supported an amendment to the constitution to legalize gay marriage. Only some 17% responded affirmatively, and some 14% did not give an opinion. In the same survey, some 41% were against the possibility of giving the same rights enjoyed by a married couple to a registered same-sex couple, and only 28% supported this possibility.

=== Rights movement ===
LGBTQ people in Mexico have organized in a variety of ways: through local organizations, marches, and the development of a Commission to Denounce Hate Crimes. Mexico has a thriving LGBTQ movement with organizations in various large cities throughout the country and numerous LGBTQ publications, most prominently in Mexico City, Guadalajara, Monterrey, Tijuana, and Puebla. The vast majority of these publications exist at the local level, with national efforts often falling apart before they take root.

== Societal prejudices and terminologies ==
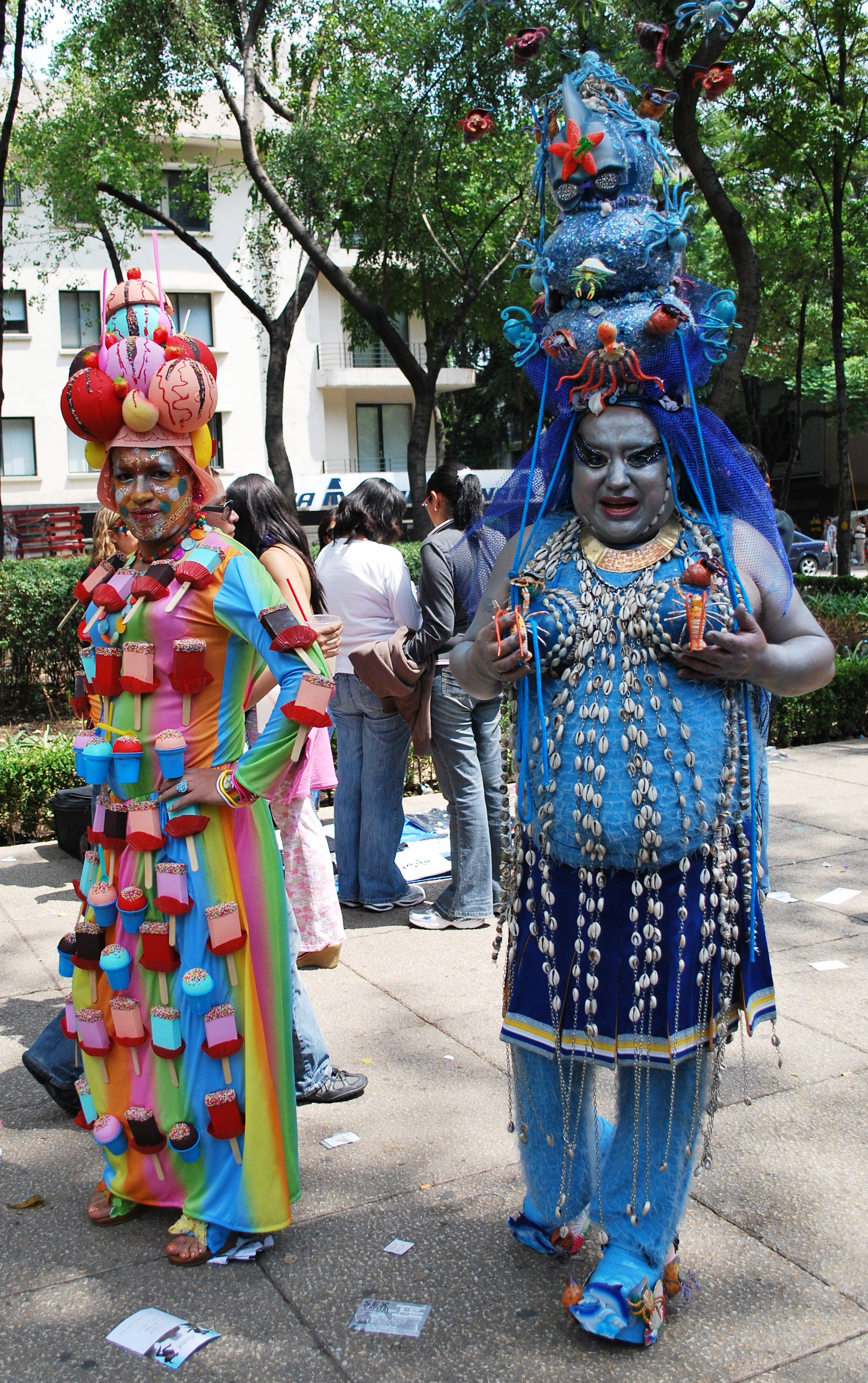
Participants in the 2009 Marcha Gay in Mexico City.

Anthropologist Joseph M. Carrier suggests that, unlike the U.S., in Mexico, a man's masculine gender and heterosexual identity are not threatened by a homosexual act as long as he plays the inserter's role.

The terms used to refer to homosexual Mexican men are generally coded with gendered meaning drawn from the inferior position of women in patriarchal Mexican society. The most benign of the contemptuous terms is maricón, a label that highlights the non-conforming gender attributes of the (feminine) homosexual man, equivalent to sissy or fairy in American English. However, to most Mexicans (gay or straight), the term maricón is highly offensive and is more an equivalent to the Canadian or American term "faggot". Terms such as joto or puto, on the other hand, speak to the passive sexual role taken by these men rather than merely their gender attributes, according to Carrier.

However, to the average Mexican, "joto" or "puto" is highly pejorative and has nothing to do with sexual roles (top or bottom). "Puto" can also refer to a guy who sells himself for money. They are more derogatory and vulgar in that they underscore the sexually non-conforming nature of their passive/receptive position in the homosexual act. The invective associated with all these appellations speaks to the way effeminate homosexual men are viewed as having betrayed the Mexican man's prescribed gender and sexual role. There are also some regional variants such as leandro, lilo, mariposón, and puñal, among others.

Carrier also suggests that homosexuality is rigidly circumscribed by the prominent role the family plays in structuring homosexual activity. In Mexico, the traditional family remains a crucial institution that defines both gender and sexual relations between men and women. The concealment, suppression, or prevention of any open acknowledgment of homosexual activity underscores the stringency of culture surrounding gender and sexual norms in Mexican family life.

Overall, however, men and women who self-identify as homosexuals in urban areas have created social networks and found public spaces for socialization without much social interference. Because of Mexican expectations that sexual differences be dealt with "sexual silence" and fear of discrimination in the family, school, and workplace, it is common for gay men and lesbians to be cautious in disclosing their sexual orientation. Leading "double lives" is often seen as necessary to ensure that one's connections with the non-homosexual world remain intact.

=== Public opinion ===
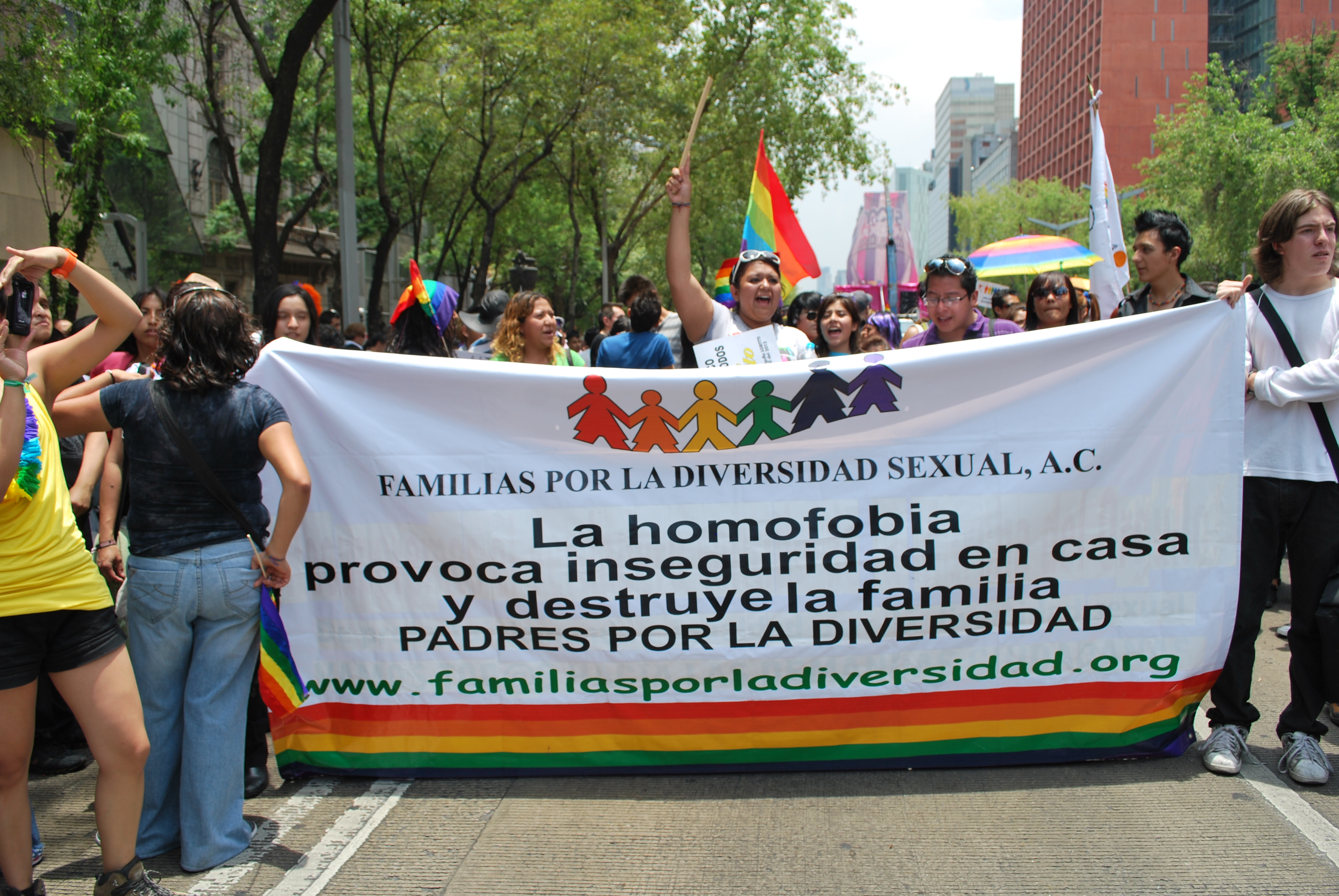
Familias por la Diversidad Sexual, the banner reads: "Homophobia provokes instability (alternative, insecurity) at home and destroys the family".

In 2007, some 71% of Mexican youth would not approve if the same rights were given to homosexuals as heterosexuals. A 2006 survey states that 33% of Mexicans feel aversion for homosexuals, some 40% do not like politicians who emphasize homosexuality, and some 32% do not like homosexual neighbors. Homophobia is also deeply rooted in the family. In 2004, only four families of those murdered in homophobic crimes, of a total of 26, offered to give information on the matter to an investigation commission.

In Mexico City, in 2004, of 125 corpses of homosexuals, only 75 were claimed by their relatives; for thirteen others, the family came only to the identification; the family of the rest did not approach the funeral home, despite having been informed. There exist signs that Mexican youth are being committed to psychiatric clinics after coming out to their family. Some 16% have been rejected by family, and a greater percentage have been physically attacked by relatives.

Popular culture encourages this attitude. The rock group Molotov released the song "Puto" on their 1997 album ¿Dónde Jugarán las Niñas?. The lyrics of the song contain phrases like "Marica nena mas bien putín, Puto nace, puto se muere, Amo a matón / matarile al maricón / ¿¡y que quiere este hijo de puta!? / quiere llorar, Puto, le faltan tanates al / ¡puto! / le falta topiates / ¡puto! / le faltan tanates al puto puto". The producer, Gustavo Santaolalla, in some statements to the magazine Retila, stated that the word "puto" had not been used in the sense of "gay" but in the sense of "coward" or "loser", which is also used in Mexico.

According to the First National Poll on Discrimination (2005) in Mexico which was carried out by the CONAPRED, 48% of the Mexican people interviewed indicated that they would not permit a homosexual to live in their house. 95% of the homosexuals interviewed indicated that in Mexico there is discrimination against them; four out of ten declared they were victim of acts of exclusion; more than half said they felt rejected; and six out of ten felt their worst enemy was society.

=== LGBTQ mental health ===
The consequences for the LGBTQ community are shown in the UAM study, which states that 27% of LGBTQ persons studied suffer mental disorders and risk of alcoholism, some 40% have thoughts of suicide, and 25% have attempted it.

=== Machismo in Mexican culture ===
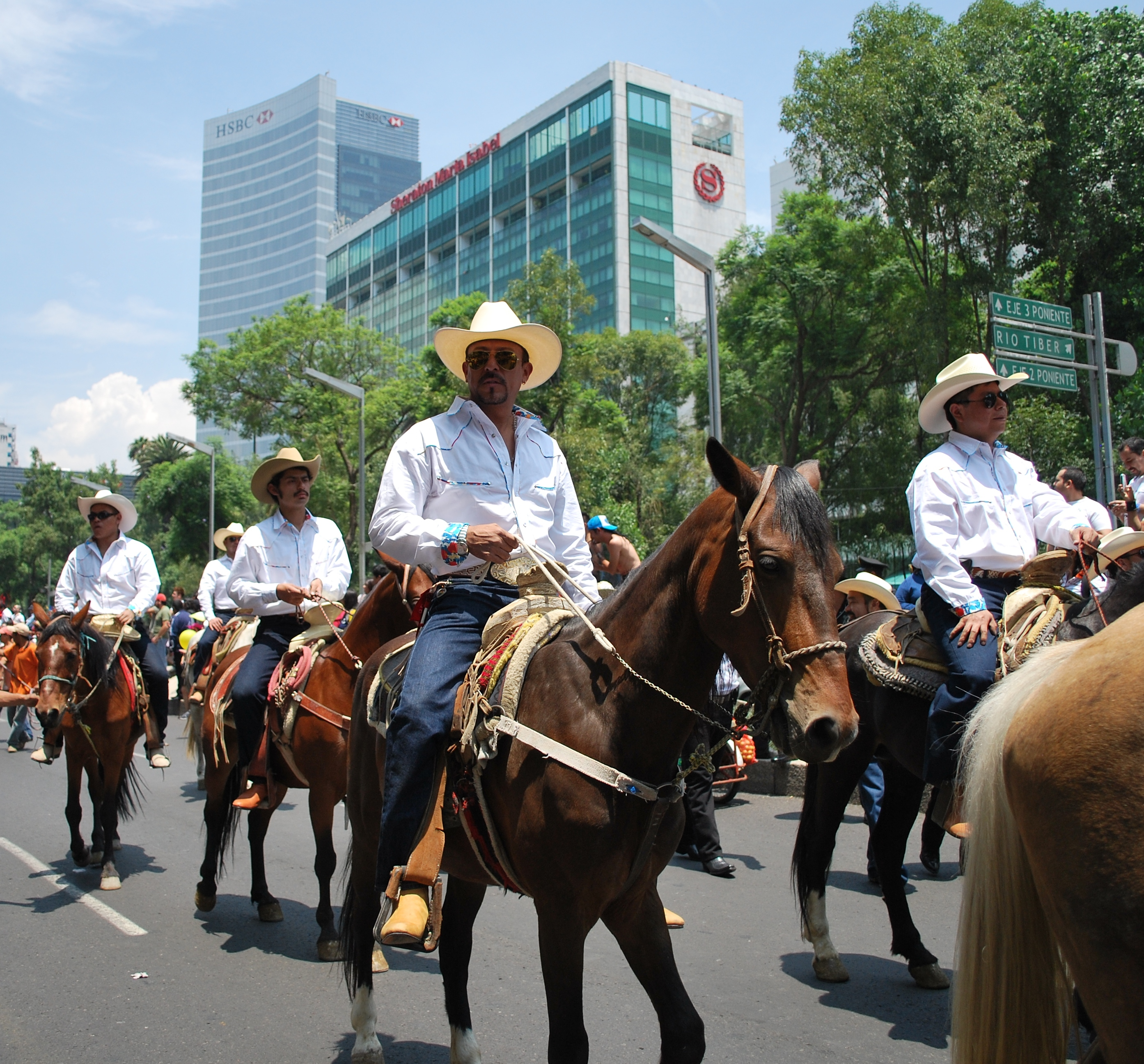
Participants at the 2012 Gay Pride Parade in Mexico City.

According to Andrew A. Reding, homosexuals remain, for the most part, invisible for two reasons. The first, which helps explain why there are no residential gay districts in Mexico, is that Mexicans tend to reside with their families far longer than their counterparts in the US. This is in part for economic reasons. Low incomes and scarce housing keep many living with their parents, as does the fact that in the absence of a government social welfare system, the family is the primary bulwark of social security. Even wealthy Mexican homosexuals often continue to live at home, acquiring a separate lodging as a meeting place for their sexual partners.

The second major reason gay men and lesbians remain invisible is the strong social stigma attached to homosexuality, particularly where it comes into conflict with the highly accentuated and differentiated sexual roles prescribed by machismo.

"The Mexican mestizo culture places a high value on 'manliness'. A salient feature of the society is a sharp delimitation between the gender roles played by males and females. In general, men are expected to be dominant and independent and females to be submissive and dependent. The distinct boundary between male and female roles in Mexico appears to be due in part to a culturally defined hypermasculine ideal referred to as machismo."

— Joseph M. Carrier.

But machismo is as much about power relationships among men as it is about establishing the dominance of men over women.

"It is not exclusively or primarily a means of structuring power relations between men and women. It is a means of structuring power among men. Like drinking, gambling, risk taking, asserting one's opinions, and fighting, the conquest of women is a feat performed with two audiences in mind: first, other men, to whom one must constantly prove one's masculinity and virility; and second, oneself, to whom one must also show all signs of masculinity. Machismo, then, is a matter of constantly asserting one's masculinity by way of practices that show the self to be 'active', not 'passive'... yesterday's victories count for little tomorrow."

— Roger Lancaster.

=== Transgressions against machismo ===
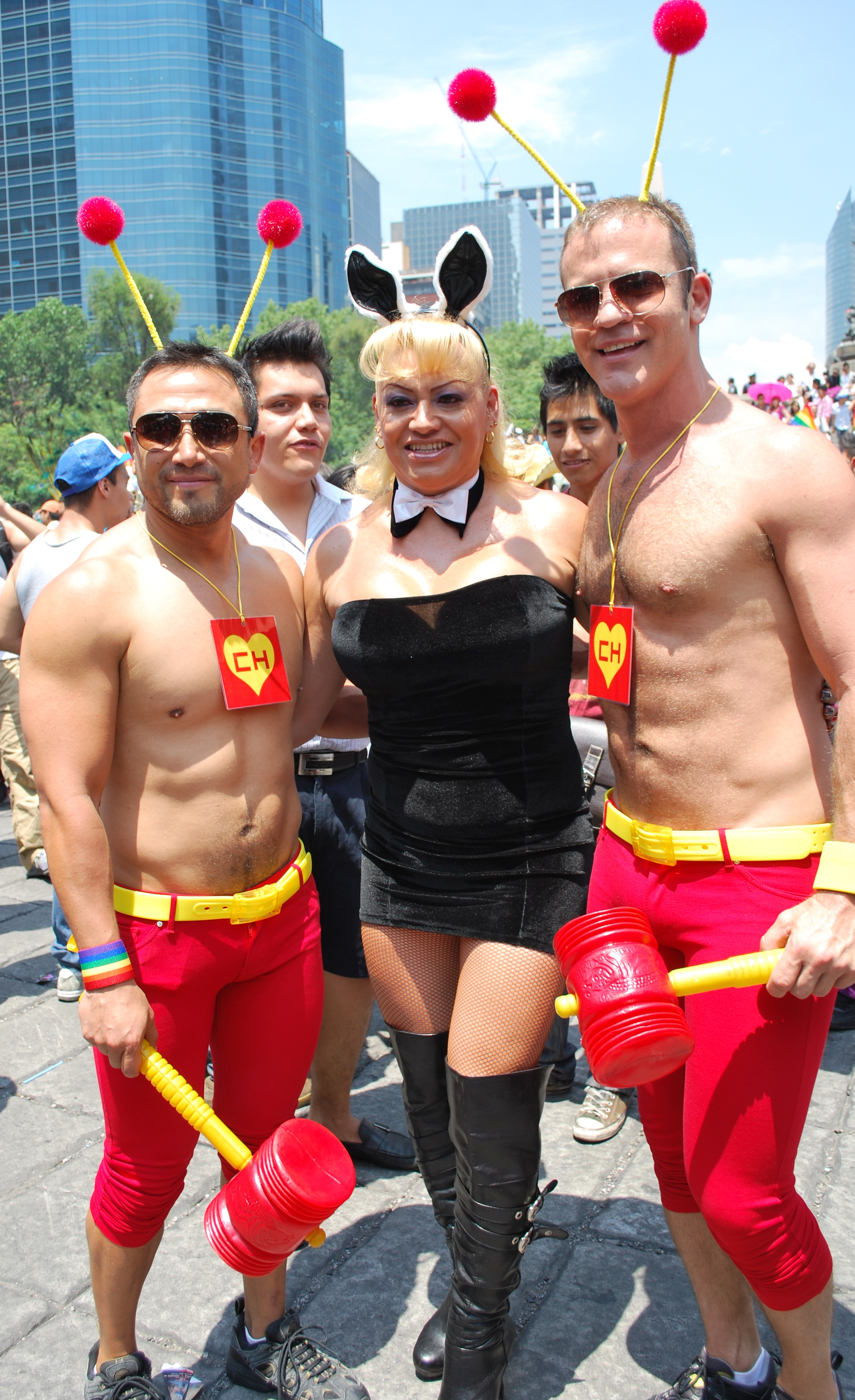
Individuals dressed as El Chapulín Colorado at the 2012 Marcha Gay

Machismo has important implications for how most Mexicans view homosexuality. Homophobia is far more intensely directed against those who violate norms of male and female conduct. This is especially pronounced among men, where effeminate behavior elicits far greater levels of social disapproval than does homosexuality per se. In the machista perspective, a man's greatest offense against the norm is to not act like a man.

Effeminacy and cross-dressing are serious violations of the masculine ideal. But the greatest transgression is for a man to assume the sexual role of a woman in intercourse. The man who penetrates another man remains masculine. The man who is penetrated loses his masculinity and incurs by far the greater social stigma.

The focus on masculinity has serious consequences. It means that most Mexican gay or bisexual males, regardless of the sexual roles they assume in private, are at pains to project a manly image in public. The relative few who are unable to do so are therefore highly exposed and subject to ridicule and harassment, to say nothing of discrimination in employment.

Because the vast majority of the homosexual population remains hidden from view, homosexuality becomes identified in the minds of many with prostitution, disease, and cross-dressing. That reinforces a vicious cycle, as prejudice keeps homosexuality underground, and the few surface manifestations of homosexuality reinforce prejudice. It also means that transvestites are subject to hatred, harassment, and police abuse. Police abuse stems not only from popular prejudice but also from the fact that street prostitution is illegal in certain jurisdictions such as Mexico City. Mexican police, whose wages tend to be very low, are notorious for corruption, extorting money from citizens. The notion of transgender, understood in terms that go beyond the demeanor-based identities of transvestites (vestidas or travestis), is of recent arrival in Mexico.

=== Social views about lesbians ===
In the gender-based classificatory system in Mexico, masculine women typically have been assumed to reject men or to want to be like them. This notion is captured in derogatory labels such as machorra and marimacha. Other derogatory terms, such as chancla or chanclera and tortillera, denote the perception that "real" sex cannot happen in the absence of a penis. Because machismo is by definition male-oriented, and is premised on male dominance in relations between the sexes, lesbian relationships are generally perceived as far less threatening to society. That is, to the extent that they are perceived at all, because to a great degree they remain invisible in a cultural context that gives little recognition to female sexuality in the first place.

"One of the cultural factors that has had the greatest impact in making lesbians invisible is the notion that we women do not have our own sexuality [...] people continue to think there's no such thing as lesbian women, they don't understand what happens sexually between lesbian women [...] that has made the culture much more permissive towards female partnerships. It would be difficult for two men to live together by themselves without giving rise to rumors; but for two women to accompany each other how beautiful it is that the poor things have found company to avoid loneliness!"

— Claudia Hinojosa.

That helps explain the view often expressed among Mexican men that lesbians are just women who have not experienced "real" sex with a "real" man. In that sense, lesbians suffer much the same treatment as other women in a society that so exalts the masculine over the feminine.

=== Violence against LGBTQ people ===
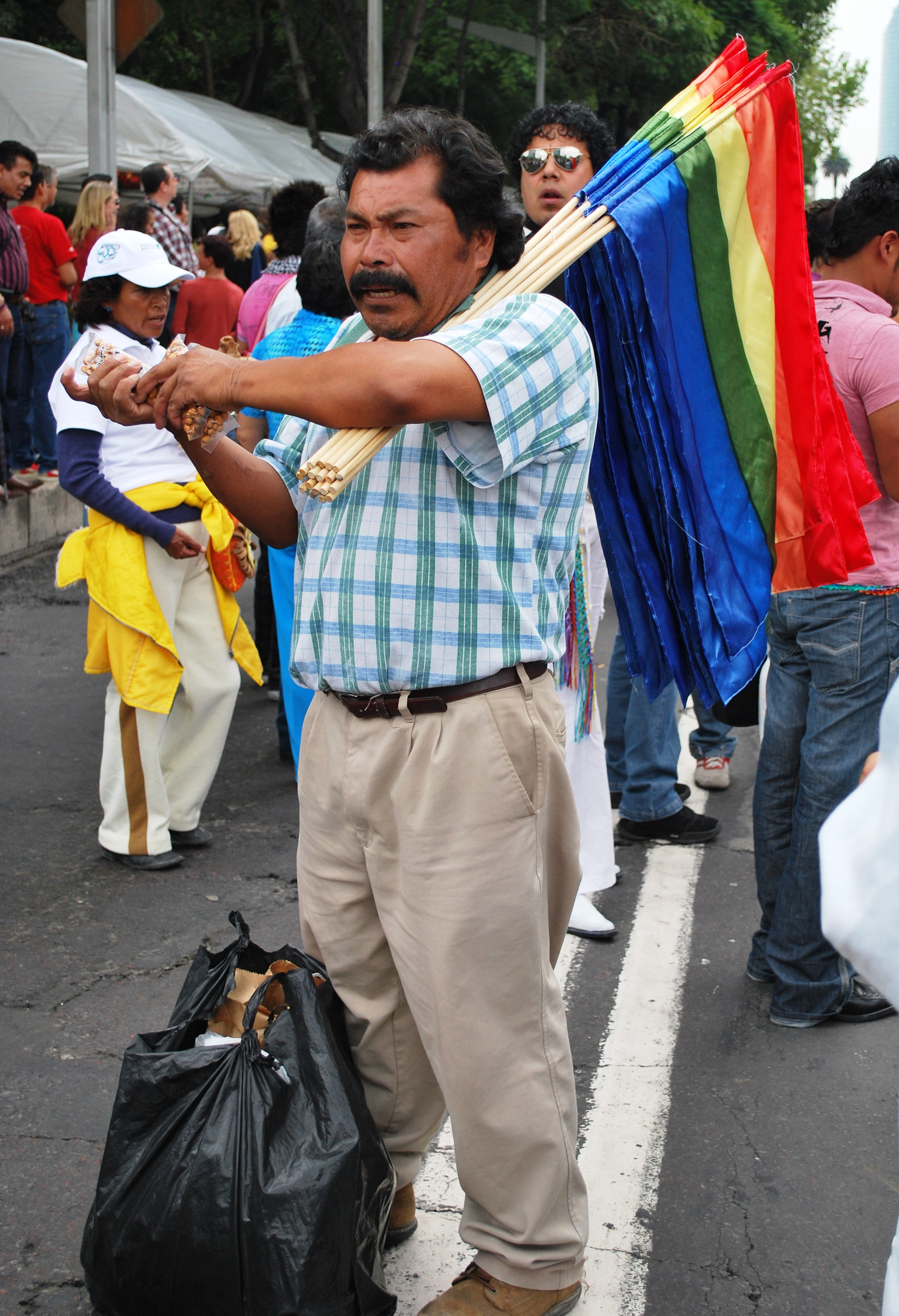
A street vendor selling rainbow flags, 2009.

Homophobia is very widespread in Mexican society. Statisticians show that between 2002 and 2007 alone, 1,000 people have been murdered in homophobic crimes, as the Chamber of Deputies revealed in May 2007, making Mexico the county with the second-highest rate of homophobic crimes in the world (after Brazil). In a journalistic study by Fernando del Collado, titled Homofobia, odio, crimen y justicia (Homophobia, Hate, Crime, and Justice), there were discussed 400 dead between 1995 and 2005, that is to say, some three murders a month. The City Commission Against Homophobic Hate Crimes calculates that only one in four crimes is reported.

From January to August 2009, 40 gay people were murdered in Michoacán alone, nearly all of them in the Tierra Caliente area. The great majority are against gay men; from 1995 to 2004, "only" sixteen women had been murdered. The crimes are often ignored or investigated with little interest by the police forces, who give impunity to the criminal in 98% of cases.

Other forms of less serious violence are classified into the following types, according to a 2007 study by the Metropolitan Autonomous University (UAM) Xochimilco campus: verbal attack in 32% of cases, sexual harassment in 18%, harassment in 12%, following or pursuit in 12%, and threats in 11%. According to the UAM study, the most frequent types of discrimination "were not hiring for a job, 13 percent; threats of extortion and detention by police, 11 percent; and abuse of employees, 10 percent".

=== Roman Catholic Church ===
Reinforcing attitudes toward homosexuality in Mexican culture is the stance of the Roman Catholic Church. Mexico City's Cardinal Norberto Rivera denounces "euphemisms" that contribute to "moral disorientation". "The arguments expressed by those who sympathize with this current that favors sexual libertinism, often appear under humanist banners, although at root they manifest materialist ideologies that deny the transcendent nature of the human person, as well as the supernatural vocation of the individual." The complementary union of man and woman, he says, is the only relationship capable of generating "true conjugal love." Anti-gay rhetoric is still acceptable in parts of the country where the influence of the Catholic Church is strongest.

The new Catechism of the Catholic Church describes homosexual acts as a "grave depravity" and "intrinsically disordered". It states that lesbian and gay relationships are "contrary to natural law [...] they do not proceed from a genuine affective and sexual complementarity. Under no circumstances can they be approved." Recognizing that "the number of men and women who have deep-seated homosexual tendencies is not negligible", it specifies that "they must be accepted with respect, compassion, and sensitivity," avoiding "every sign of unjust discrimination." Yet it mandates that "homosexual persons are called to chastity."

== Indigenous LGBTQ people ==
Even though Mexico's majority mestizo, racially mixed and assimilated, culture, permeated by machismo, is hostile to male homosexuality, particularly in its more effeminate manifestations, some of its indigenous cultures are a lot more tolerant. Isthmus Zapotecs and Yucatán Mayans are cases in point. Particularly, the Zapotecs developed the concept of a third gender, which they referred to as muxe, as an intermediate between male and female.

"Muxe, persons who appear to be predominantly male but display certain feminine characteristics are highly visible in Isthmus Zapotec populations. They fill a third gender role between men and women, taking some of the characteristics of both. Although they are perceived to be different from the general heterosexual male population, they are neither devalued nor discriminated against in their communities. Isthmus Zapotecs have been dominated by Roman Catholic ideology for more than four centuries. Mestizos, especially mestizo police, occasionally harass and even persecute muxe boys, but Zapotec parents, especially mothers and other women, are quick to defend them and their rights to "be themselves", because, as they put it, "God made them that way." I have never heard an Isthmus Zapotec suggest that a muxe chose to become a muxe. The idea of choosing gender or of choosing sexual orientation, the two of which are not distinguished by the Isthmus Zapotecs, is as ludicrous as suggesting, that one can choose one's skin color."

— Beverly Chiñas.

Somewhat androgynous, they do both women's and men's work. While their apparel can be somewhat flamboyant, they are often more masculine than feminine in dress. A muxe status is recognized in childhood. It is widely believed that muxes are artistically and intellectually gifted. Many Zapotec parents consequently decided to keep them in school longer than other children.

According to Chiñas, "Isthmus Zapotec culture allows both women and men more freedom to express affection in public for persons of the same sex than does Anglo North American culture." In the special case of fiestas, however, heterosexual men are expected to not engage in any bodily contact with either men or women while dancing. Women, on the other hand, are allowed to dance with each other, and muxes may dance with each other or with women.

Though not necessarily approving such liaisons, Isthmus Zapotec society is tolerant of persons who publicly form same-sex couples, whether male or female. Both types of couples occur with comparable frequency. Zapotecs are also tolerant of bisexuality and transvestism. Chiñas affirms that she seldom witnessed any instances of ostracism based on sexual orientation or same-sex liaisons.

The Zapatista Army of National Liberation (EZLN), a mostly indigenous and armed revolutionary group, on 1 January 1994, the same day the North American Free Trade Agreement (NAFTA) went into effect, began a rebellion against the Mexican government in the southern state of Chiapas, the country's poorest. They have included in several proclamations to the nation "the homosexuals" as an oppressed group along with indigenous peoples, women and peasants.

"In the complex equation that turns death into money, there is a group of humans who command a very low price in the global slaughterhouse. We are the indigenous, the young, the women, the children, the elderly, the homosexuals, the migrants, all those who are different. That is to say, the immense majority of humanity."

— Subcomandante Marcos.

== See also ==
- LGBT in Argentina
- LGBT in Chile
- LGBT in Colombia
- Guadalajara Gay Pride
- Zona Romántica
