= Puto =

Puto may refer to:

- Puto (bug), a genus of scale insects
- Puto (film), a 1987 Filipino teen fantasy comedy
- Puto (food), a Filipino food
- Puto (slur), a Spanish swear word
- "Puto" (song), a 1997 song by Mexican band Molotov
- Puto (TV series), a 2021 Filipino comedy series

== See also ==
- Mount Putuo, an island in China
- Putto, an artistic depiction of a boy
