= Voto latino =

Voto latino may refer to:

- Latino vote, a topic
- Voto Latino, US organization
- "Voto latino (Latin Vote)", a song by Molotov on the ¿Dónde Jugarán las Niñas? album
