= Effects of NAFTA on Mexico =

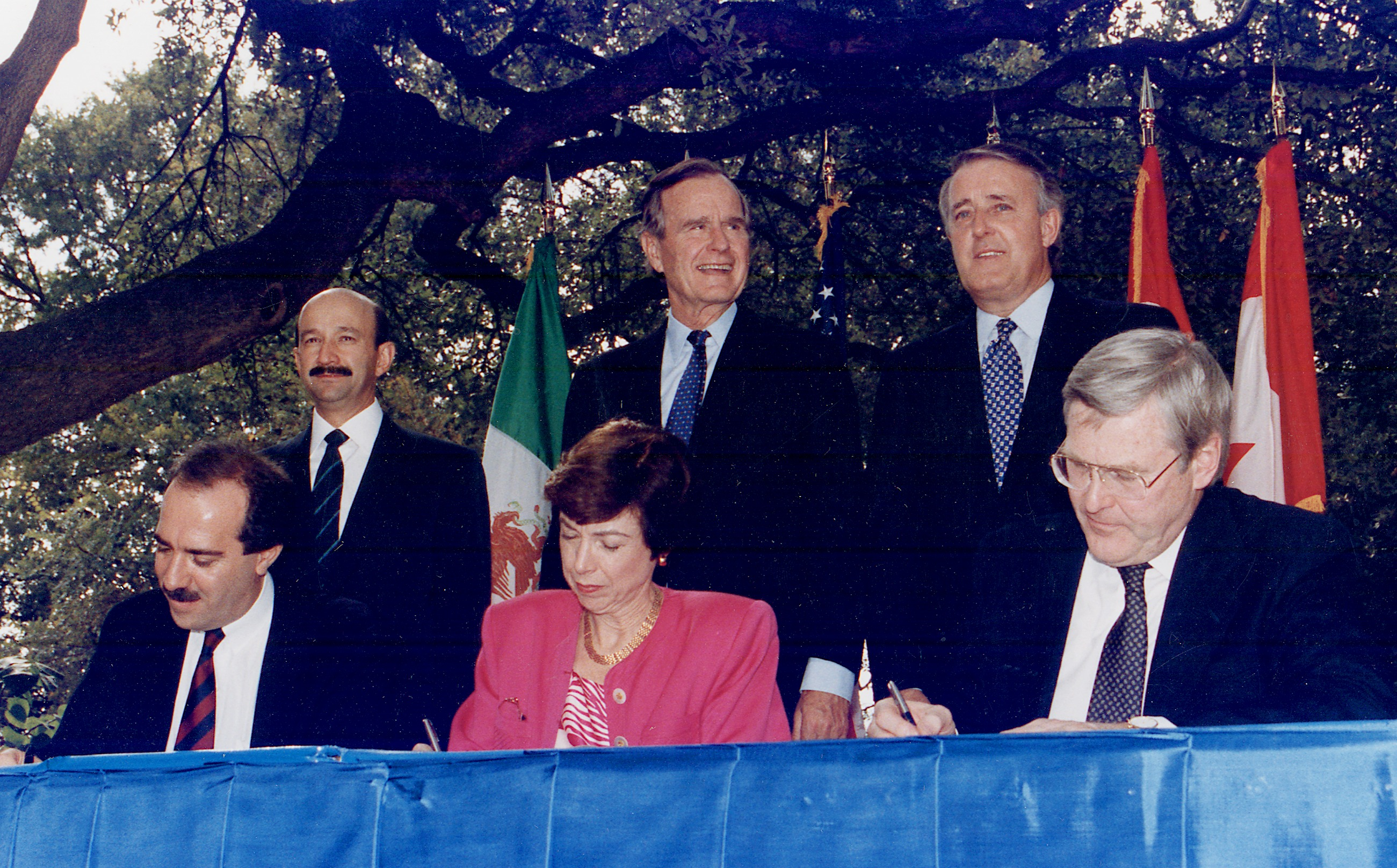
The President of the United States and the President of Mexico are pictured here at a 1992 initialization ceremony for NAFTA

The North American Free Trade Agreement of 1994's effects on Mexico have long been overshadowed by the debate on the Agreement's effects on the economy of the United States. As a kind partner in the agreement, the effects that NAFTA has had on the Mexican economy is essential to understanding NAFTA on a whole. A key factor in this discussion is the way the Agreement was presented to Mexico; namely, that it would increase development of the Mexican economy by providing more middle class jobs that would enable more Mexicans to lift themselves out of the lower classes. Thus, wages, employment, attitudes, and migration all present essential areas of analyses to understand effects NAFTA has had on the Mexican economy.

Overall, NAFTA has not met the expectations promised during its negotiation. Economic growth has been steady at around two percent, but that growth is far from the growth the deal was supposed to bring. NAFTA initially decreased employment, and wages have largely remained static over the years that NAFTA has been in place. Mexicans overall have a critical view toward the trade deal, but are generally opposed to a complete repeal of the law.

In 2020, NAFTA was officially replaced by the United States–Mexico–Canada Agreement (USMCA). USMCA was originally initiated by former US president Donald Trump to remedy perceived imbalanced in NAFTA that disadvantaged the US. However, the finalized of USMCA differs very little from NAFTA, and is not expected to make a significant change in the economy.

== Background ==
When NAFTA was being developed to include Mexico, the developers of the deal presented it as way to create more middle class jobs in Mexico by increasing development and investment in Mexico. This deal followed a trend of increased neo-liberal policies in Mexico that ultimately made the implementation of NAFTA possible. Placed in the larger context of Mexican economic liberalization, NAFTA represents another step in the historic transformation of the Mexican economy from protectionist to open to trade. The passage of NAFTA represented an important moment for Mexico and the United States, as it represented a tying together of the two economies in a way that had never been done before between two relatively economically unequal countries.

== Economic effects ==
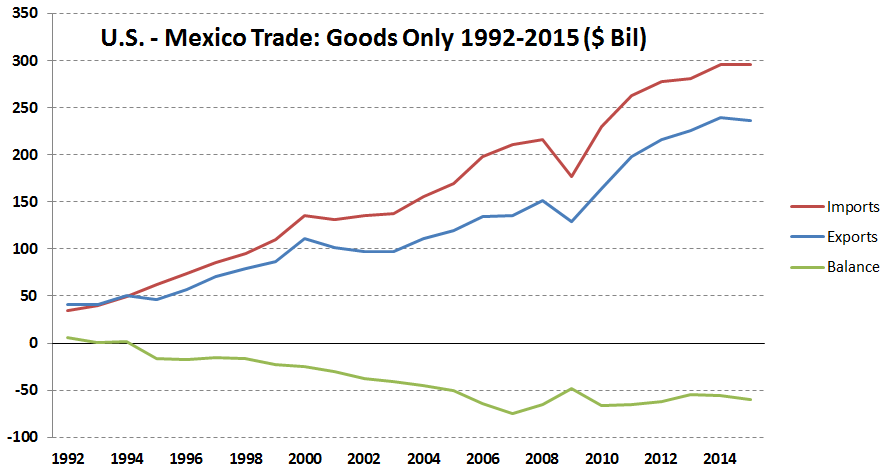
This graph shows the growth of trade with Mexico following the passage of NAFTA.

The economic growth of Mexico has remained steady between 1.2 and 2.5 percent since the passage of NAFTA, far from the large-scale growth NAFTA was supposed to lead to. This economic growth has not translated in the wage growth that would create higher wages and reduce inequality. However, Mexican trade underwent a rapid increase since NAFTA was put into place, with exports increasing from 8.56 percent of Mexican GDP in 1993 to 36.95 percent in 2013. This increase in exports led to a decrease in the Mexican trade deficit. The United States is currently Mexico's largest trade partner, with 88.66 percent of Mexican exports going to the United States. As a result, Mexico's economy is largely tied up in the United States’. Due to this increased dependency on the United States’ economy, Mexico was affected by the 2008 U.S. financial crisis more than any other Latin American nation. In fact, Mexico has since been trailing behind Latin America with an average .9% per-capita output growth rate in the two decades following NAFTA's implementation.

Foreign investment increased greatly following the passage of NAFTA, with billions of dollars yearly being invested in Mexico. This foreign investment manifested in an increase in manufacturing as a share of Mexican exports, with exports to the United States increasing to 88.66 percent of Mexican exports by 2001. Despite this increase, manufacturing exports became increasingly concentrated in a few industries, meaning that the benefits were in turn concentrated. Recently, the growth of China as a U.S. trading partner has stifled the growth of Mexican exports to the U.S., with the growth rates of Chinese exports to the U.S. outstripping exports from Mexico. Since U.S. exports comprise most of Mexico's exports, and since Mexican imports do not comprise such a high percentage for the U.S., Mexico feels the economic effects of the United States’ growing trade with China. Overall, Mexican foreign trade experienced an expansion leading up to and following the passage of NAFTA largely as a result of increased manufacturing investments by a few firms. There have been internal job losses due to subsidized agriculture in the United States. This internal job loss has largely affected rural farming areas, where historically families could support themselves through domestic farming. The liberalization of trade has brought in subsidized corn from the United States, which makes it difficult for rural families to support themselves via farming. Subsidized U.S. corn and other commodities has led to an increase in food poverty due to centralized production of agricultural goods.

== Employment and wages ==
While changes in employment have occurred in Mexico since the passage of the Act, a variety of factors may have played a role in changes in employment. Upon passage, NAFTA did bring benefits to Mexico, such as more private investment, but it failed initially to create the jobs that were promised. NAFTA was passed during a time of recession in Mexico, which contributed to the minimal effect of the Act. Additionally, liberalization of trade as a result of the Act contributed to the loss of "nearly two million" agricultural jobs as a result of competition from the highly subsidized U.S. agricultural industry. Overall, unemployment in Mexico rose following the passage of NAFTA, largely due to the increased competition from United States agriculture. During the time following the passage of NAFTA, internal manufacturing employment fell by 44,000 while employment at foreign-owned manufacturing firms grew by approximately half a million jobs. Overall employment growth remained sluggish following the passage of NAFTA. Additionally, the opening up of the Mexican market decreased internal industrial production, as more international firms imported cheaper components into Mexico to use at assembly plants; despite increased manufacturing, firms used fewer Mexican components. Labor productivity growth has remained low, due largely in part to the dominance of foreign driven manufacturing and the stable but low wages that comes with manufacturing jobs.

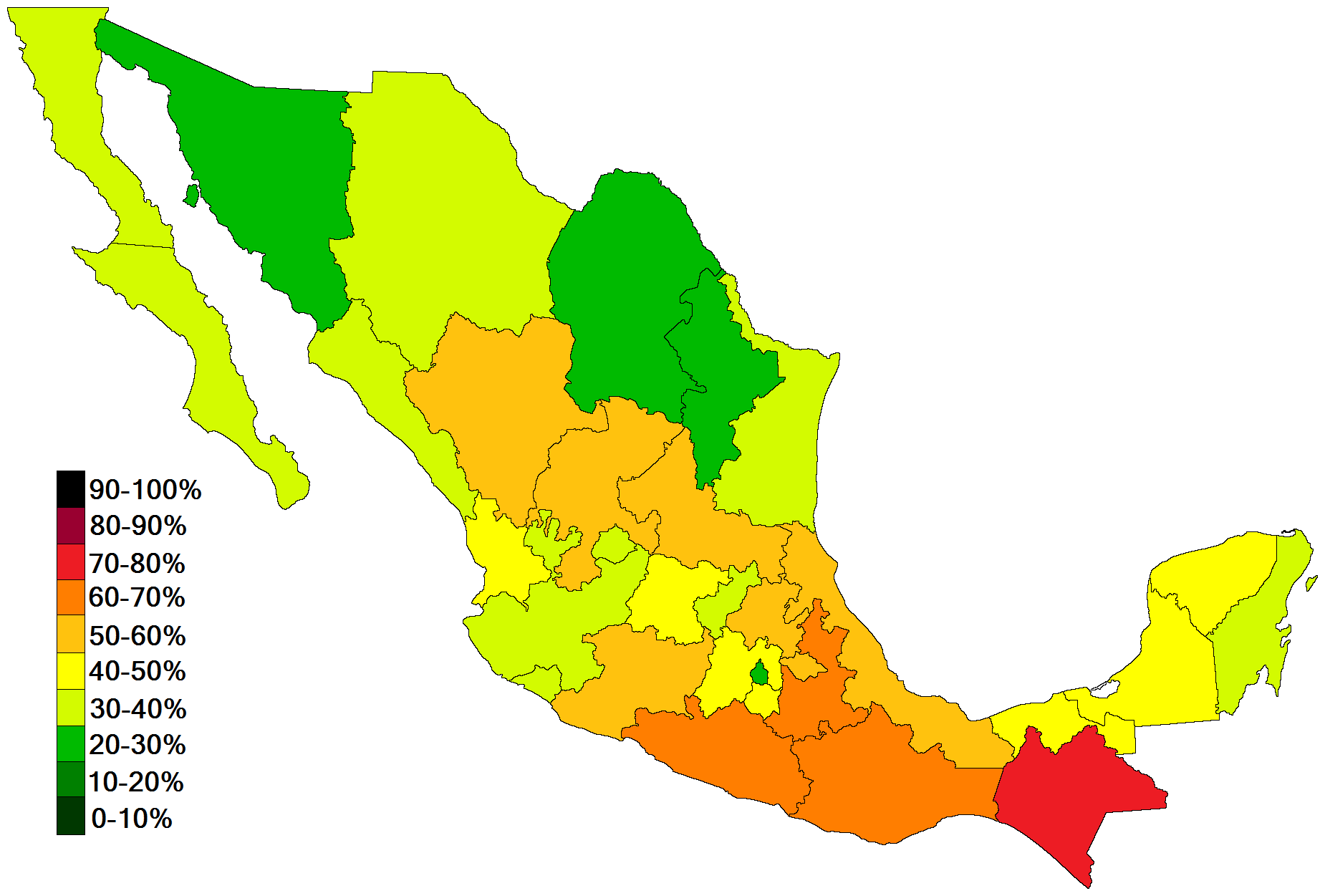
This image shows the percentage of people living in poverty as of 2012 on a state-by-state basis. Consistent with internal economic migration patterns, poverty is more concentrated in regions farther away from the U.S. border.

The labor side agreement within NAFTA also affected the ability of workers to organize into unions, which in turn affected the quality of work available for workers. This agreement, along with the rest of NAFTA, made it harder for the Mexican government to neglect following its own labor laws. Furthermore, the passage of NAFTA made it advantageous for established factories and manufacturing plants to move from southern and central Mexico to northern Mexico closer to the border where collective bargaining was harder due to migration and ease of recruitment for low-wage jobs. Overall, unionization amongst the working population has decreased from 22.4 percent in the early 1990s to 13 percent in 2012.

Wages for workers at jobs made possible by NAFTA have largely remained lower than at equivalent jobs in the United States. By permanently tying Mexican economic growth to an export-heavy model, new jobs created under NAFTA have largely been in the low-wage manufacturing sector, with real manufacturing wages falling to 12 percent below the 1994 level by 2002. Economists in Mexico have argued that the growth and higher salaries that the Act should have created have failed to materialize for the workers of Mexico. Wages in Mexico have stagnated as well in the years following the passage of NAFTA, and inequality in the country still remains high, a trend that mirrors the economic trends in the United States. Overall, new income is distributed upwards, so new wealth is not distributed to the vast majority of Mexican workers. Due to this phenomenon, those who would benefit the most by expressing themselves politically face increased barriers to entry into the political system due to social isolation and lack of influence through wealth.

== Effects on migration and emigration ==
While the primary function of NAFTA did not center on immigration, part of the Act did liberalize temporary immigration to the United States. Initial discussions of NAFTA did not plan for migration, as migration was not seen as related to the overall economic goals of NAFTA, and it was only later in negotiations that migration was addressed. However, part of the overall goal for both the United States and Mexico in the passing of the Act was reducing migration by stimulating the Mexican economy through the creation of more middle-class jobs. When NAFTA was initially passed, Mexican emigration to the United States surged, though it is unclear whether the Act itself was the direct causal factor in this surge. However, part of this surge can be attributed to the continued economic stagnation in Mexico and the reliance of United States agriculture on low-wage migrant workers. The heavily subsidized agricultural industry was able to compete with Mexican agriculture following the passage of NAFTA, which affected the ability of Mexican rural farmers to support themselves on farming. According to the Council on Foreign Relations, surging emigration to the United States following the passage of NAFTA could be tied to the loss of Mexican agricultural jobs due to subsidized agriculture in the United States. While it appears that emigration to the United States increased in the short run following the passage of NAFTA, some scholars have argued that the long-term effects of NAFTA will actually be a reduction in the number of people emigrating as a result of long-term economic gains.

== Attitudes towards NAFTA in Mexico ==
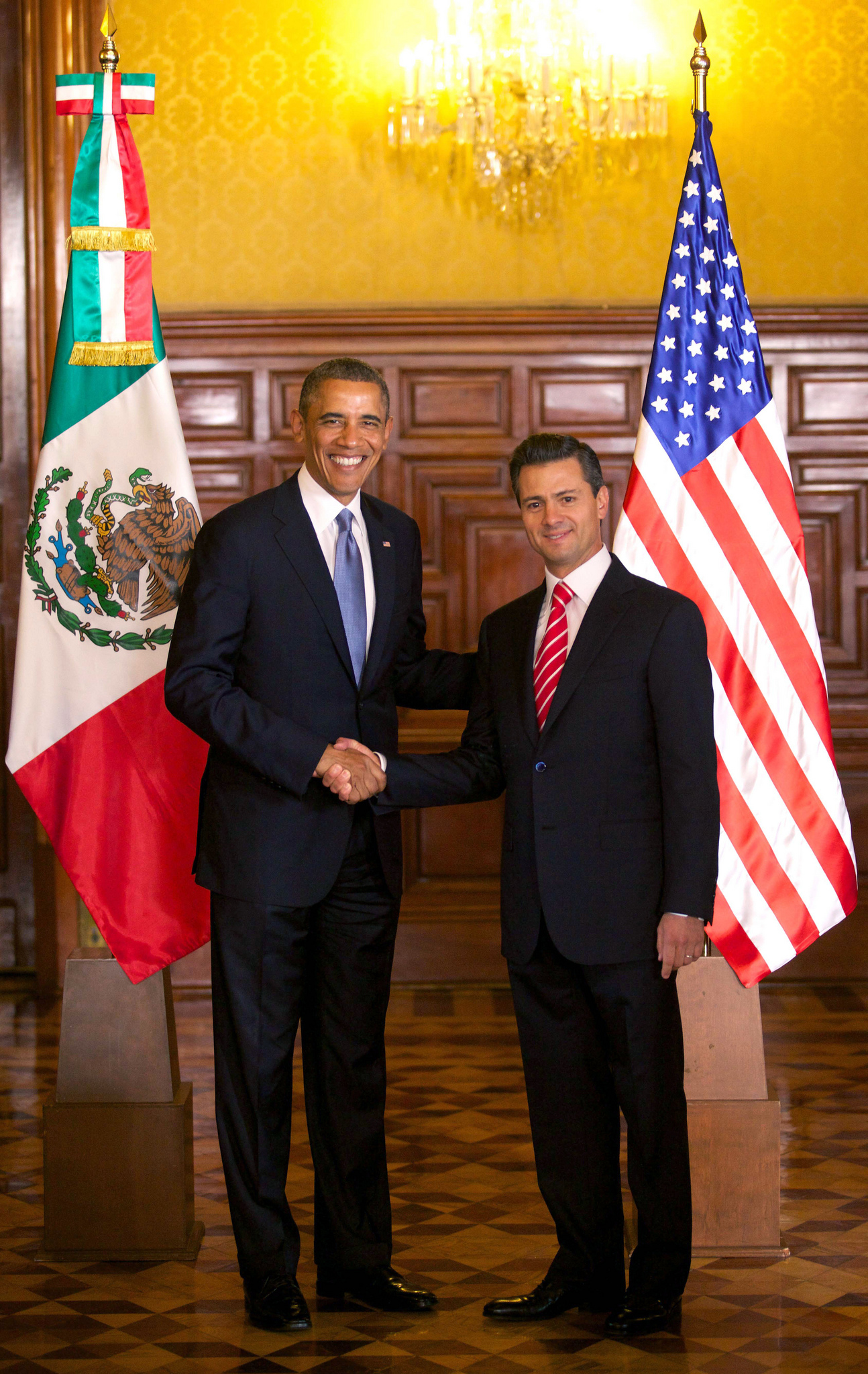
President Obama and President Nieto meet in Mexico. Elite attitudes towards NAFTA differ from lower-class attitudes.

Attitudes towards the economic effects of NAFTA in Mexico vary based on class. Among the working class, there is a feeling of confusion towards the Act and the discrepancy between the promises made around the Act and the seeming effects of the Act. In a New York Times article written shortly after the passage of NAFTA demonstrates that among the working class, there was a belief that "there would be more jobs, and a greater flow of information and goods". Conversely, businesspersons and owners of manufacturing companies held a more optimistic view of NAFTA, believing that "the infrastructure and trade contacts are going to give us the change to sell our products and take advantage of the North American market".

More recently, working-class individuals in Mexico share the view that NAFTA has failed on its promises. Wages for manufacturing workers have remained stagnant, and instead of opportunity, many workers see NAFTA as holding back expansion. A worker interviewed for The New York Times indicated that "I thought it [NAFTA] would make my life better, that this agreement would create opportunities for everyone". Luis Rubio, a pro-free trade researcher indicated that NAFTA "created the perception that things would get better, but the truth is we have two economies, one of exporting and the other one left behind," indicating that process that was made under NAFTA was not shared by all. Owners of large companies that operate in Mexico have even shown more critique towards NAFTA, though they place blame on the Mexican government for failing to "establish policies to protect Mexican businesses". However, in contrast to some of the rhetoric in the United States, Mexicans see NAFTA as being beneficial despite the difficulties due to the linking of the Mexican economy to the United States and the sustained foreign investment. By-and-large, the sentiments amongst the business class is that NAFTA needs to be revisited, not removed. Elites and free-trade proponents in Mexico have heralded NAFTA as a success on the basis of new foreign investments and the increased stability of the business environment within Mexico. They also push the idea that failures are due to an unwillingness to move on from the past by those affected by NAFTA. Overall, the working class shares a largely negative outlook towards NAFTA, where the elites and free-trade advocates look at NAFTA's benefits outweighing the detriments. However, the overall belief is that NAFTA needs to be fixed and not removed. On September 30, 2018, Trump alongside the two other leaders from the other countries (Canada/Mexico) signed USCMA.

That sentiment is shared today by the Mexican elites. Calls from the United States for a repeal of NAFTA have been met with trepidation in Mexico, with the overall belief being that NAFTA should be modernized instead of replaced or even simply removed. Generally, Mexico recognizes NAFTA as not being perfect, but a repeal would sever the economy from the United States which would have far worse outcomes than either leaving it in place or renegotiating it. Former President Peña Nieto has made calls for the deal to be revisited in order to update it for the modern Mexican economy since the original deal could not account for the new sectors that have emerged since the passage of NAFTA. Workers and researchers today agree that the promises of NAFTA are falling short, but by-and-large they are not calling for a repeal, favoring a modernization or renegotiations to update the deal and fix the issues in it.

== Implications for health ==
NAFTA has health implications for the Mexican population. Specifically, the leniency towards foreign direct investment (FDI) along with the limitation on government intervention have acted as catalysts for the nutrition transition. NAFTA's liberal investment rules accelerated the FDI from the United States into Mexican food processing, resulting in a rise of imports yet maintaining a limited growth of GDP. In 1987, US companies invested $210 million per year in the Mexican food processing industry; this number has increased to $5.3 billion per year as of 1998 (a 25-fold increase). Three-quarters of FDI was delegated to the production of processed foods – sales of processed foods expanded by 5-10% per year between 1995 and 2003.

NAFTA also facilitated multi-national alliances with existing domestic companies, resulting in an explosive growth of chain supermarkets and convenience stores from fewer than 700 pre-NAFTA to 3,850 in 1997 and 5,729 in 2004. A decade of NAFTA saw food retail in Mexico dominated by supermarkets, discounters, and convenience stores (55%) while smaller "tiendas" were losing business. "Tiendas," however, were predominate in small towns but have been outlets for large transnational and domestic food companies to sell and promote their food products to poorer populations. As a result, we see a rise in processed foods in both urban and rural settings.

The United States' increasing presence in the Mexican food system, with the increase in exports of corn, soybeans, sugar, snack foods, and meat products, has contributed to altering the food system from agricultural to industrial. NAFTA trade policies and market liberalization have transformed the food system in Mexico to one that is dominated by the intake of processed foods, sugar, salt, meat, and fat. This shift has, in turn, led to detrimental health consequences – diseases of urbanization including obesity, diabetes and other nutrition-related non-communicable diseases.

== See also ==
- Constitution of Mexico § Constitutional reform of anticlerical articles and land reform under Salinas
