= Guadalajara Gay Pride =

Annual LGBT event in Guadalajara, Mexico

Guadalajara Pride
- Genre: LGBT Parades
- Locations: Guadalajara Jalisco, Mexico
- Years active: 40
- Founded: June 1979

The Guadalajara Pride (Spanish: Desfile del Orgullo, lit. 'Pride Parade') is an event that celebrates diversity in general and seeks equal rights for LGBT people, is celebrated in the city of Guadalajara, Mexico.

The parade was founded in 2014 by activist Karina Velasco Michel, after years of fighting for it and after several moves against homophobia in the city of Guadalajara, this city was the first city in the country after Mexico City in which there were demonstrations and marches demanding equal rights for the LGBT community.

This gay parade in Guadalajara, is widely known Latin America along with those in cities such as Mexico City, São Paulo and Buenos Aires. This event is celebrated every third week of June. The Guadalajara Pride celebrations are usually preluded by a week of cultural events focused on the LGBT community to promote human rights and practice the right of freedom of speech. The Semana de la diversidad (diversity week) includes the International LGBT Film Festival of Guadalajara (MIX Festival de Diversidad Sexual en Cine y Video), along with art expositions, conferences, marathons, concerts and artistic and cultural activities. The parade starts at Glorieta de la Minerva and ends at Plaza de la Liberación.

== History ==
In Mexico, the first openly gay movement was in 1978 when a gay contingent participated in the solidarity march commemorating the tenth anniversary of government repression of the October 2. The first gay pride march was held in Mexico City in 1979 organized by the Homosexual Front of Revolutionary Action, the autonomous group Oikabeth Lesbian and the Gay Liberation group LAMBDA.

1983 saw the birth of the Gay Pride group GOHL led by Pedro Preciado Neglete, a tapatio activist who decided to create this group after the discriminatory and arbitrary arrests and harassment of homosexuals by the Metropolitan Police during the Flavio Romero de Velasco government period, which was characterized by repression of the gay community in the 1980s. The first movement was organized by GOHL the same year in the summer of 1983 in protest of the atmosphere of hostility and repression that violated the civil rights of thousands of homosexuals in the city of Guadalajara. Both this and the rest of the movements and events that GOHL tried to organize were backed by the government of Romero de Velasco, and for almost fifteen years public demonstrations in support of homosexual groups were repressed by the government, though some cultural days and events were held during those years.

Years later, the International Lesbian and Gay Association (ILGA), which is currently a global partnership that works with the United Nations Organization and the European Union to promote the rights of lesbian women, gay men, bisexuals, transgender and intersex people in the world, accepted the offer of Guadalajaran groups (including GOHL) to organise its 1991 world conference. A couple of weeks before it would take place, the preparations had to be changed. The reasons for that were not only condemnations by the conservative church led by Archbishop Juan Jesus Posadas Ocampo, but also threats from both the local and the State (of Jalisco) officials that participants would be arrested, co-operating hotels would be closed and most of all, that police would not offer any protection against death squads. A solution was found in moving the conference to Acapulco, Guerrero, where the local government welcomed the participants and offered them free soft drinks during the whole conference. Strangely enough both the Guadalajaran and the Acapulcon local government were ruled by the same party, the Partido Revolucionario Institucional.
