= Puto (song) =

1998 single by Molotov

Single by Molotov

from the album ¿Dónde Jugarán las Niñas?
- Released: 1998
- Length: 2:07
- Label: Universal Music Latino; Surco
- Songwriter: Ismael Fuentes
- Producers: Gustavo Santaolalla; Aníbal Kerpel

Molotov singles chronology
| "Voto Latino" (1997) | "Puto" (1998) | "Cerdo" (1998) |

Music video
- "Puto" on YouTube

"Puto" is a song by the Mexican rock band Molotov. It was released in 1998 as the band's third single taken from their debut album, ¿Dónde Jugarán las Niñas? It was written by Tito Fuentes, and produced by Gustavo Santaolalla.

The lyrics criticize people whom Fuentes perceives as cowards, such as a band member that left Molotov to join another band, as well as members of the political class. However, the word puto has multiple meanings, including its use as a homophobic slur, which sparked controversy, including within the LGBTQ community. Molotov's performances received protests, and in Spain, they received complaints for allegedly inciting violence against LGBTQ people.

"Puto" has been described as the band's signature song. Molotov has adapted "Puto"'s dedication during live shows, for the COVID-19 pandemic in Mexico, and it was reinterpreted by Fuentes as "No Putx" in 2021.

== Background and writing ==
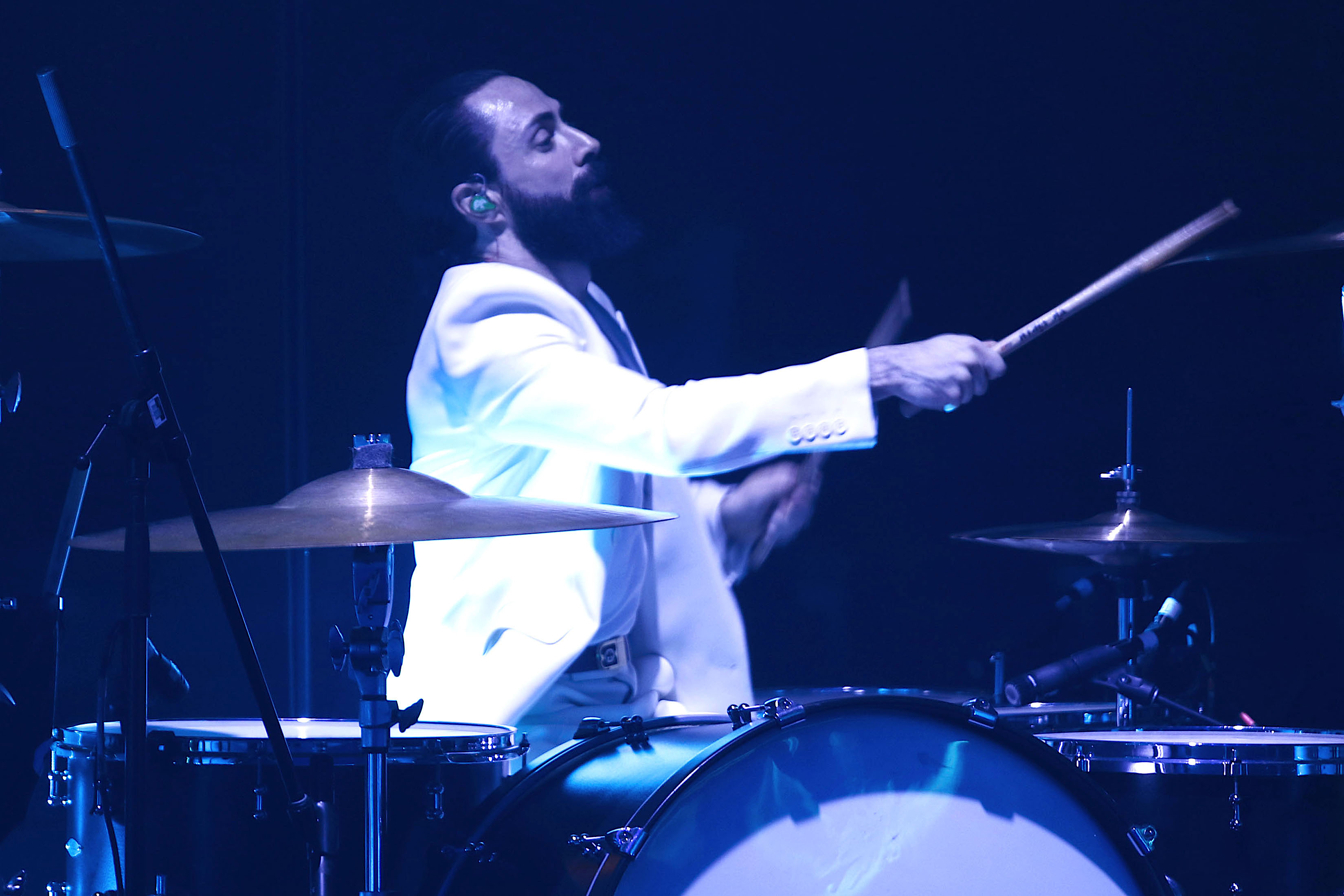
Jay de la Cueva performing with Fobia in 2020. Fuentes wrote the song in response to what he perceived as de la Cueva's lack of commitment in leaving Molotov.

Ismael "Tito" Fuentes (vocals and guitar) and Miguel "Micky" Huidobro (bass) formed Molotov in 1995 along with Javier "Jay" de la Cueva (bass) and Iván "La Quesadillera" Moreno (drums). De la Cueva and Moreno later left the group and were replaced with Francisco "Paco" Ayala and Randy Ebright, respectively. De la Cueva departed after accepting an offer to join the Mexican band Fobia without informing the other members of Molotov. Angered by his departure, Fuentes wrote "Puto" as a reflection on what he viewed as de la Cueva's lack of commitment to the band ("¿Qué, muy machín, no?"). (Note: "So you are a macho man, no?") After Fobia disbanded in 1997, shortly after de la Cueva joined, Fuentes mocked the situation in the song ("quiere llorar, quiere llorar"). (Note: "he wants to cry, he wants to cry")

In the album and single versions, the song is dedicated to "Micky [Huidobro], his brother [Francisco Huidobro], and Iñaki [Vázquez]", the latter two members of Fobia.

== Release and homophobia debate ==
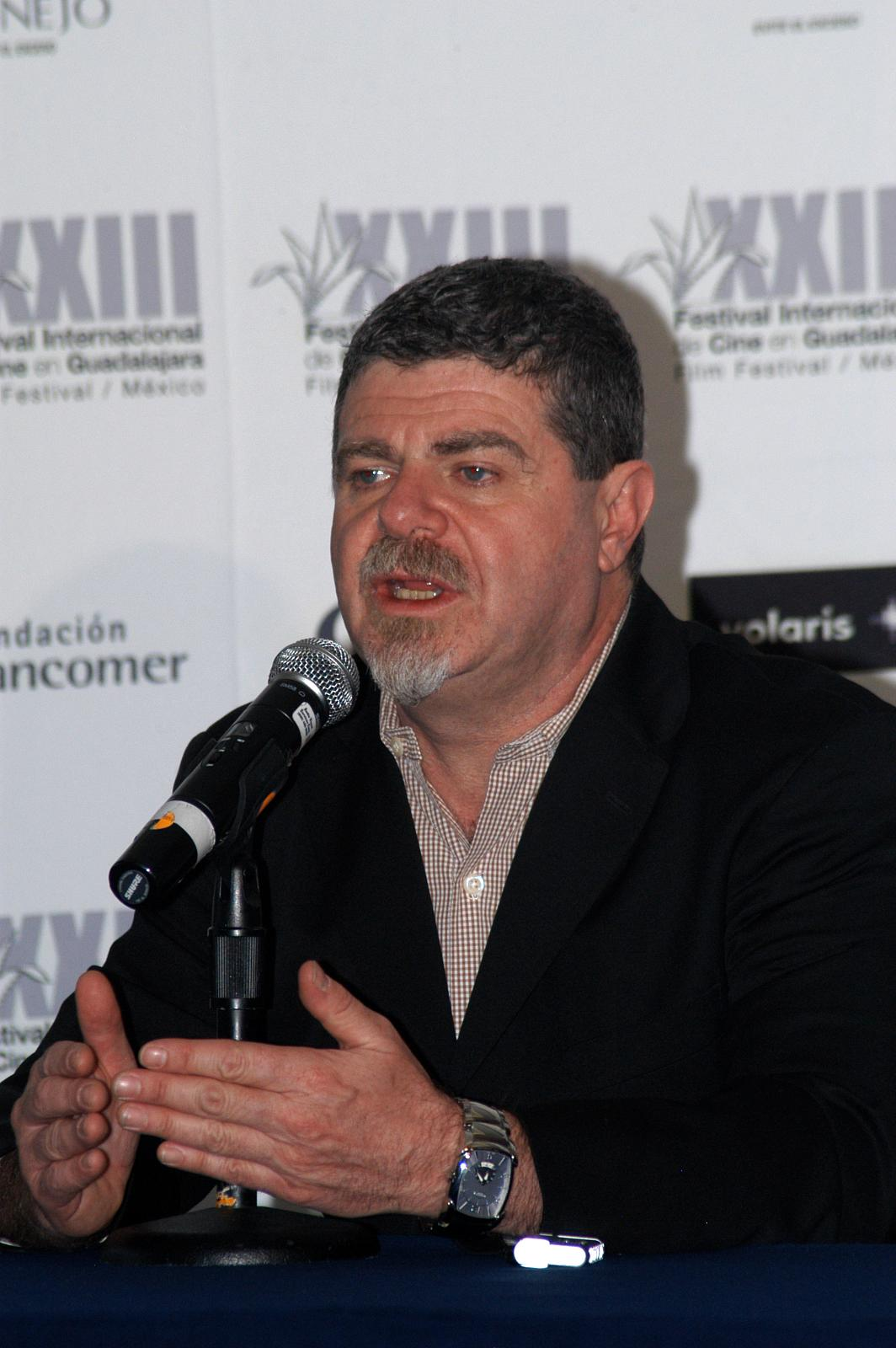
Gustavo Santaolalla, the album's producer, defended the lyrics of the song.

"Puto" was on Molotov's debut album, ¿Dónde Jugarán las Niñas?, released in 1997; it was used as the album's third single. A remix was later included on the CD single for "Gimme tha Power".

The song's title is derived from the Spanish word puto, which has multiple meanings, many of them comparable to those of faggot in English. Coupled with other lyrics containing homophobic slurs, including matarile al maricón, (Note: "let's play kill the queer" or "kill the faggot") "Puto" sparked controversy and was widely interpreted as a homophobic song. Conservative groups, including the Legionaries of Christ and Opus Dei, condemned the song as obscene and urged parents to prevent their children from listening to Molotov.

Band members argued that the lyrics had been misunderstood, stating that they target not the LGBTQ community but people they consider to be scoundrels or cowards. According to them, the song is instead directed at the Mexican government, political class, corrupt politicians, and those who "harm people and humanity". Gustavo Santaolalla, the album's producer, said that a "puto is someone who takes away your food [...] someone who abuses their power".

"Puto" was released during a period of significant political and economic turmoil in Mexico. The country had spent almost 70 years under the de facto one-party rule of the Institutional Revolutionary Party, media and news reports were dominated by Televisa, the 1994 Mexican peso crisis had deepened existing social and economic inequalities, and the 1994 North American Free Trade Agreement started to have negative effects in the country. Amid widespread public discontent, younger generations found in politically charged rock bands such as Molotov a means of expressing their frustration with the country's political and social conditions.

=== Live performances ===
It's a cathartic song intended to express the frustration we feel toward the political class. It serves as a vehicle for that expression. The bad news for our detractors is that the song isn't directed at the gay community.

—Ayala discussing the song's live performances

In October 1998, Molotov was the subject of a criminal complaint alleging discrimination following a concert in Barcelona, Spain, amid protests by LGBTQ groups. The complaint cited Article 510 of the Spanish Penal Code, under which the band's members could have faced one to three years' imprisonment for "inciting discrimination, hatred, or violence" against LGBTQ people. Similarly, in Bilbao, EHGAM, an LGBTQ collective, presented another complaint. In their denounce, the group argued that, beyond questions of linguistic interpretation, the song's lyrics incited violence against the LGBTQ+ community, particularly the lyric matarile al maricón. The complaint was subsequently referred to the court in Madrid for further review, but was ultimately dismissed after the court accepted linguistic arguments concerning the term's usage across different varieties of Spanish.

During Molotov's 2013 tour of the United States, the band's concerts were met with protests by LGBTQ groups. GLAAD urged the band not to perform the song live. Dave Montez, the organization's president at the time, argued that, although the song was not intended to offend LGBTQ people, the slurs it contains are commonly used in a homophobic manner. The band declined the request. However, following the assault of a young gay man in Chile in August 2013, Molotov decided to omit the word maricón while touring the United States because it was one of the slurs shouted at the victim during the attack.

During the Saint Lawrence festivities in 2016, which also promote the fight against homophobia and sexism, the song was played as part of a playlist in Plaza de Agustín Lara, in the Lavapiés neighborhood of Madrid. Following the incident, the councilor requested an investigation.

Ayala does not believe that performing "Puto" during live shows makes the band members homophobic, as the song was not written with that intention.

=== Description as LGBTQ anthem ===
In 2022, Ebright said that "Puto" had allegedly become a LGBTQ anthem in Mexico, adding that "if you're proud of who you are, there's no need to take offense". Singer Christian Chávez criticized the declaration, saying that he and many others he had spoken to disliked the song. Although he acknowledged that songs can be reclaimed, he argued that "you can't say it's a song for the community because it's a song that caused the community a great deal of pain for a long time; many people who died as a result of hate crimes heard the word 'puto' as their last words". Writing for Rolling Stone, Pablo Monroy sarcastically remarked that such a claim was akin to saying that the song "is a capitalist-communist anthem that addresses the global ecological crisis and the Maya Train [issues], and has undoubtedly played a pivotal role in the struggle for women's rights across all waves of feminism that sparked and resolved the Cristero War".

== Critical reception ==
Writing for Chilango, Luis Del Valle Rey remarked that the song keeps audiences jumping continuously throughout its brief duration. Sports commentator Pali Plascencia wrote an op-ed for Excélsior made comparisons about the football chant ¡eeeh, puto! shout during matches. He considers that Molotov "uses and dissects with mastery and precision" the expression puto because it is intended to offend not only those who deprive others of their livelihoods and those who cover up such actions, but also those who are apathetic, complacent, unquestioningly trust politicians, or are indecisive and lukewarm in their decision-making.

Writing for Letras Libres, Alberto Fernández criticized what he described as Molotov's doublethink in defending "Puto" and its live performances. He argued that, on the one hand, the band maintains that the song is not discriminatory and invokes freedom of expression in its defense. On the other hand, "Frijolero", released years later, criticizes stereotypes and discrimination against Mexican migrants, including the use of slurs such as "beaner". Fernández also rewrote a fragment of "Frijolero" to illustrate how a gay person might ask others to stop equating homosexuality with cowardice.

Greg Schelonka and Mark A. Hernández labeled "Puto" as Molotov's signature song.

== Formats and track listings ==
CD single

1. "Puto" – 2:07
2. "Chinga Tu Madre" – 4:10
3. "Cerdo" – 3:00

"Gimme Tha Power" single

1. "Gimme Tha Power (Versión Album)" – 4:11
2. "Cerdo (Versión Porcina Radio Edit)" – 3:38
3. "Puto (Mijangos Extended Mix)" – 8:01

Promotional single

1. "Puto" – 2:21

Maxi single

1. "Puto" – 2:08
2. "Rap Soda y Bohemia" – 4:03
3. "Puto (Mijangos Hard Mix)" – 7:00

== Personnel ==
Credits adapted from ¿Dónde Jugarán las Niñas?

- Francisco Ayala – background vocals, bass
- Carlos Castro – assistant engineer
- John Chamberlin – recording engineer
- Ismael Fuentes – writer, vocals, background vocals, guitar
- Randy Ebright– background vocals, drums
- Michael Geiser – assistant engineer
- Miguel Huidobro– background vocals, bass
- Aníbal Kerpel – associate producer
- Tony Peluso – recording engineer
- Gustavo Santaolalla – producer
- Gordon Suffield – recording engineer

== Cover versions and adaptations ==
The song's dedicatory varies during live performances. In 2020, Molotov rewrote the lyrics of "Puto" amid the COVID-19 pandemic in Mexico, retitled as "Juntos" (transl. "Together"). The following year, Fuentes and Georgel released "No Putx", a song that samples "Puto" and whose lyrics address violence against LGBTQ people, including the use of conversion therapy.

Malcriada released a cover version that was recorded for Somos frijoleros, a tribute album of Molotov songs, published by Warner Music.
