= ¿Dónde Jugarán las Niñas? =

- Cover to the original edition of the album

Studio album by Molotov
- Released: August 26, 1997
- Recorded: February–July 1997
- Genre: Rap metal
- Length: 44:38
- Label: Surco
- Producer: Gustavo Santaolalla

Molotov chronology
| ¿Dónde Jugarán las Niñas? (1997) | Molomix (1998) |

Alternative cover
- Re-release cover

Singles from ¿Dónde Jugarán las Niñas?
- 1. "Gimme Tha Power" Released: 1997; 2. "Voto Latino" Released: 1997; 3. "Puto" Released: 1998; 4. "Cerdo" Released: 1998

Professional ratings
Review scores
| Source | Rating |
|---|---|
| Allmusic | 4/5 stars |

¿Dónde Jugarán las Niñas? is the first studio album by Mexican rock band Molotov, released in 1997 by Surco Records. The album's title, literally "Where Will The Girls Play?", is a pun on Maná's ¿Dónde Jugarán los Niños? and is also intended as a sexual double-entendre underpinned by the risqué cover featuring a young woman's legs seductively displayed in school uniform.

The album's opening track, "Que no te haga bobo Jacobo", refers to Jacobo Zabludovsky, newscaster of Televisa who is portrayed in the song as being biased and unreliable.

== Track listing ==
| No. | Title | Writer(s) | Title in English | Length |
|---|---|---|---|---|
| 1. | "Que no te haga bobo Jacobo" | Miguel Ángel Huidobro Preciado | "Don't let Jacobo play you for a fool" | 3:23 |
| 2. | "Molotov Cocktail Party" | Randall Ebright | | 3:34 |
| 3. | "Voto latino" | Ismael Fuentes de Garay | "Latino vote" | 2:58 |
| 4. | "Chinga tu madre" | Huidobro | "Fuck your mother" | 3:18 |
| 5. | "Gimme Tha Power" | Huidobro | | 4:10 |
| 6. | "Mátate Teté" | Huidobro | "Kill yourself, Teté" | 4:31 |
| 7. | "Más vale cholo" | Fuentes; Javier De La Cueva; Huidobro | "Better to be cholo" | 4:45 |
| 8. | "Use It or Lose It" | Juan Francisco Ayala Gonzalez; Ebright | | 4:22 |
| 9. | "Puto" | Fuentes | "Faggot" | 2:07 |
| 10. | "¿Porqué no te haces para allá?... al más allá" | Huidobro | "Why don't you move over there? To the Great Beyond" | 4:47 |
| 11. | "Cerdo" | Fuentes | "Pig" | 2:48 |
| 12. | "Quítate que ma'sturbas (Perra arrabalera)" | Huidobro | "Move out of the way, you're making me masturbate (Slum bitch)" | 3:55 |

== Charts ==
Weekly chart performance for ¿Dónde Jugarán las Niñas?
| Chart (2000) | Peak position |
|---|---|
| Swiss Albums (Schweizer Hitparade) | 99 |

== Sales and certifications ==
| Region | Certification | Certified units/sales |
|---|---|---|
| Argentina (CAPIF) | Gold | 38,000 |
| Mexico (AMPROFON) | 4× Gold | 350,000 |
| Spain (Promusicae) | 2× Platinum | 200,000^{^} |
| United States (RIAA) | 2× Platinum (Latin) | 200,000^{^} |
| Worldwide | — | 1,000,000 |
^{^} Shipments figures based on certification alone.
