= Puto and puta =

Spanish-language profanities

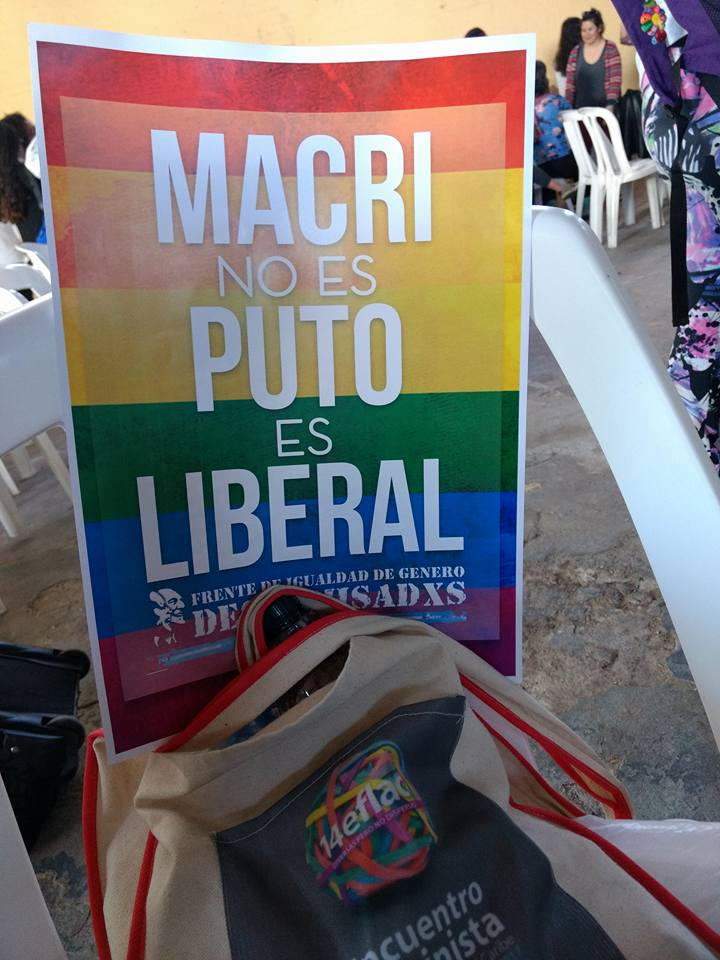
A poster bearing the slogan 'Macri is not a puto; he is a liberal' in Spanish. Because the slogan is against a LGBTQ rainbow flag background, the meaning may be interpreted as implying an attack to Macri's masculinity. However, due to the emphasis of Macri puto liberal, the slogan may simply mean 'Macri, fucking liberal'.

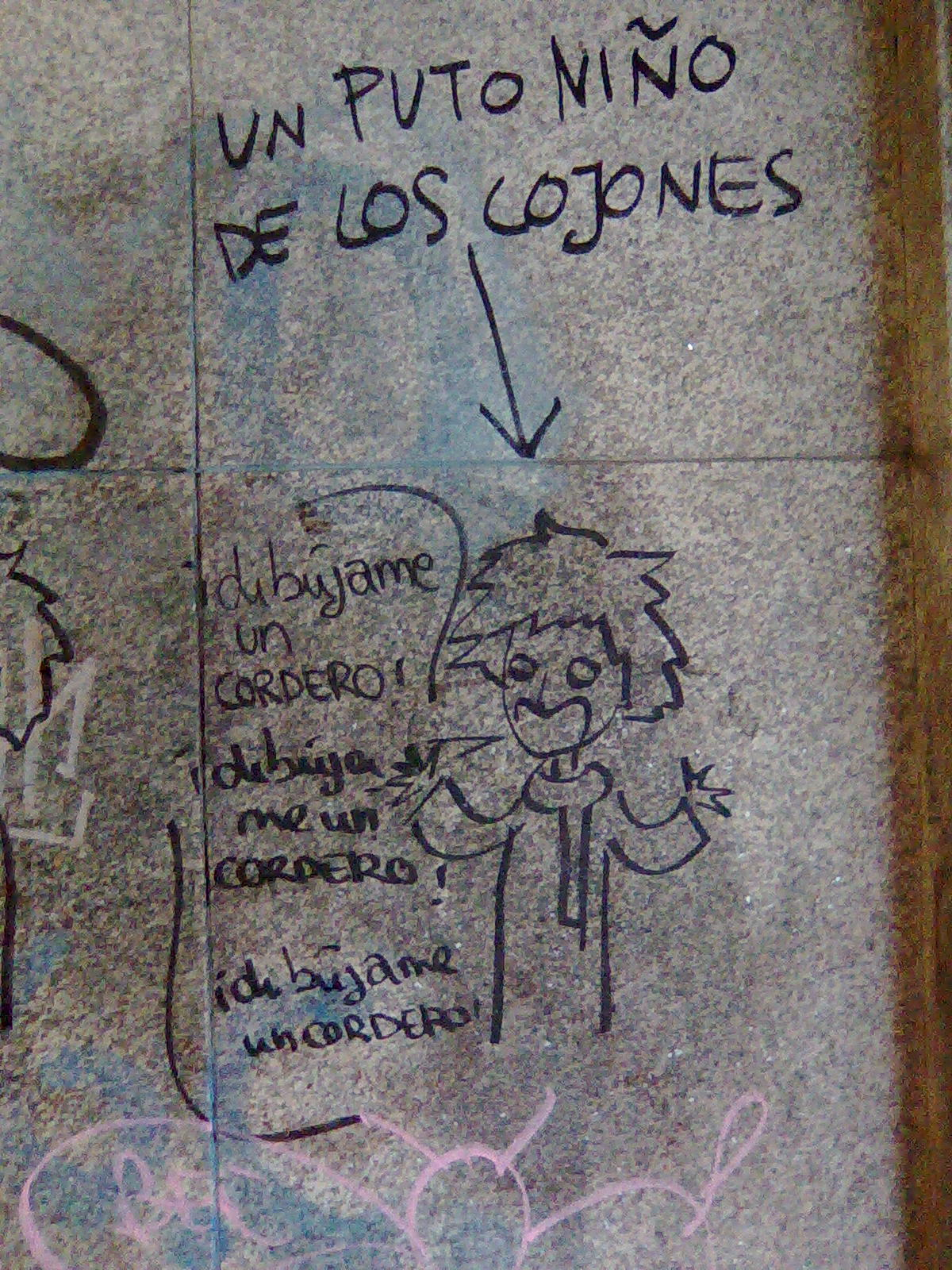
Graffiti of the titular character of The Little Prince with the text 'A fucking annoying kid', referring to his persistent requests for a drawing of a sheep to the narrator. Here, the word puto is used as an intensifier expressing annoyance rather than as a descriptor of the prince.

Puto (masculine) and puta (feminine) are Spanish-language profanities with multiple meanings depending on the context in which they are used. The Spanish language has a grammatical gender distinction, so the words' meanings are not always interchangeable due to diachrony.

The words puto and puta can be used as nouns, adjectives, and interjections with varying results. As nouns, both words can mean prostituto or prostituta ('prostitute' or 'whore' in English). The masculine form can also refer to homosexuality, gay men, or be used as a slur questioning or attacking a man's masculinity, regardless of his sexual orientation, with a meaning similar to faggot in English. The female form, on the other hand, has a meaning similar to slut in English. As adjectives and interjections, both words serve as intensifiers and have a meaning equivalent to the English word fuck.

The use of puto during association football events has been labeled as a homophobic slur because of the word's background. This has led to the implementation of protocols regarding its use during association football events.

== Origin ==
Antonio de Nebrija records the use of the word puto in reference to male homosexual intercourse in his Latin–Spanish bilingual dictionary, Diccionario latino-español (1492). The dictionary distinguishes active and passive participants, describing the active role as paedico ('one who penetrates the anus'), while the passive participant is identified as catamitus, a word derived from the Greek mythological figure Ganymede. The first edition of the Diccionario de la lengua española, published in 1780 by the Royal Spanish Academy, adopts Nebrija's definition and defines puto as 'the man who commits the heinous sin. Cinaedus, catamitus'.

In one of his etymological dictionaries, Diccionario crítico etimológico de la lengua castellana (1954), Joan Coromines wrote that the word puto derives from the female equivalent, puta, meaning 'sodomite, especially the passive partner'. Coromines states that the origin is unclear, with hypotheses suggesting that it may derive from the Latin putus ('boy or girl'; 'young man or woman') or putidus ('heinous', 'stinking' or 'fetid').

Meanwhile, according to Miguel Casas Gómez in La interdicción lingüística (1986), the feminine equivalent, puta, came to be used as a euphemism for 'public woman'—that is, a prostitute. Álex Grijelmo wrote in El País that euphemisms tend to acquire the negative connotations of the terms they replace, eventually requiring replacement by newer euphemisms. In Medieval Spanish literature, puta is commonly accompanied by adjectives like "old" or those indicating deformities, but never adjectives that imply dirtiness.

Both words are associated with sex but have undergone diachronic changes in their meaning. According to Concepción Company Company and Rodrigo Flores Dávila, who wrote an article in the Bulletin of the Royal Spanish Academy in 2025, Christianization accelerated the semantic shift of the word putus from meaning 'boy' to serving as an insult meaning 'homosexual', and it later became associated with prostitution in the same way as its feminine counterpart, puta. According to the authors, this semantic development suggests that both heterosexual and homosexual pederastic behavior was tolerated in ancient Rome.

Historically, the word puta has been used by Spanish-speaking authors and has not been surpassed in usage by its masculine counterpart. At the same time, singular forms are more common than plural forms. The earliest known use of puta dates to 1129, in an anonymous text contained in the Fueros de Medinaceli. The earliest known record of puto, dates to 1284, in the anonymous Libro de los fueros de Castiella. Both works are legal documents in which the words appear alongside other insults and are cited as examples of punishable slurs when uttered as defamatory accusations.

== Grammar ==
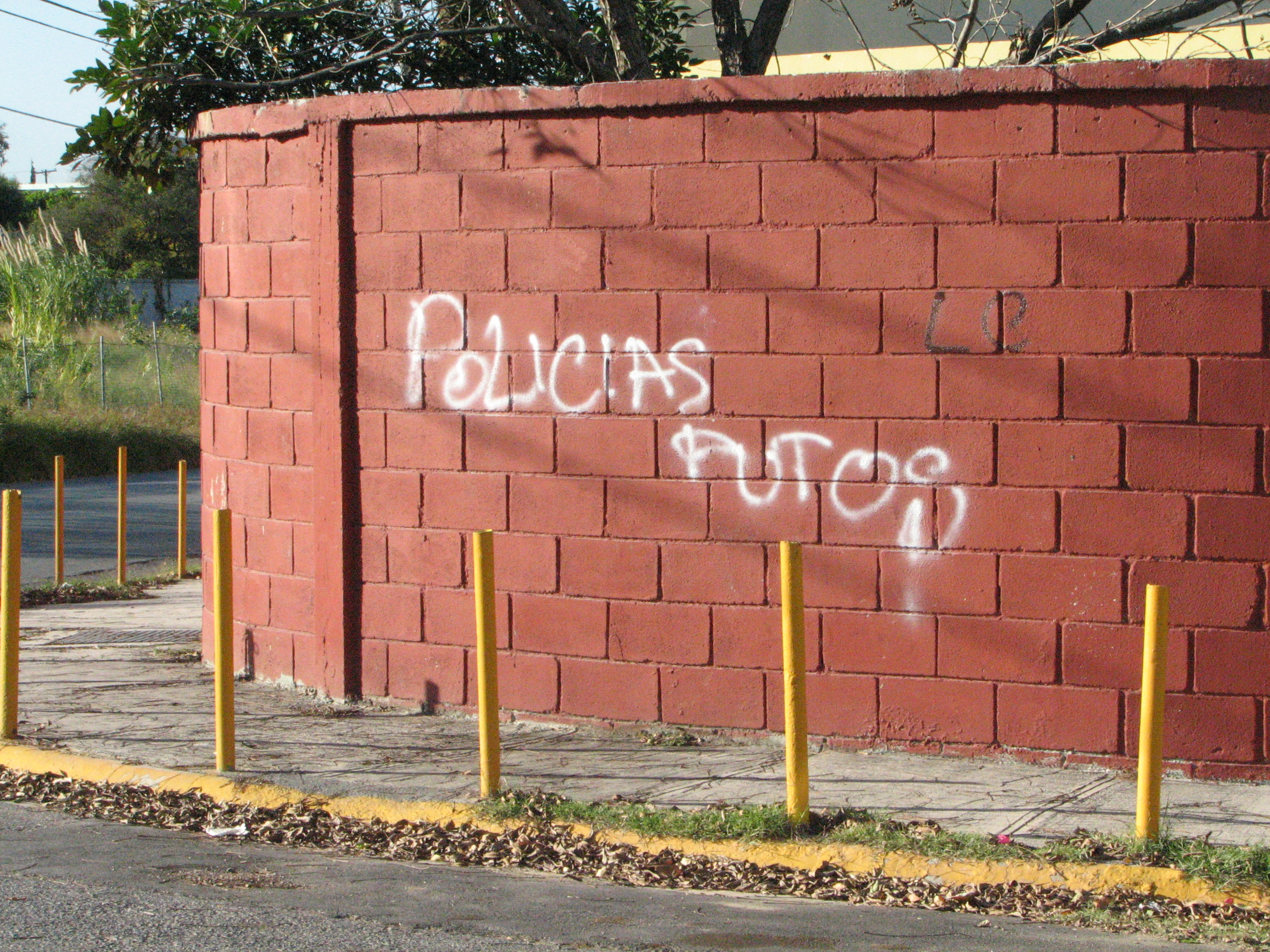
Graffiti reading policías putos, which can be translated as 'bastard cops'. In Spanish, an adjective placed after a noun typically describes it, whereas one placed before the noun generally serves to emphasize it.

Company and Flores describe puto and puta as formulaic words whose meaning are largely fixed by their semantics and syntactic structure; modifying them may cause them to lose their referential meaning. As an example, they cite the profane phrase ¡hijo de puta!—commonly translated as 'son of a whore' or 'son of a bitch'—, noting that the receiver being addressed by the sender is not necessarily the son of one. However, when additional words are introduced, as in the sentence el hijo de la gran puta que vive en la esquina ('the bloody son of a whore who lives on the corner'), the phrase gains greater morphological and syntactic flexibility, to the point that puta becomes a referential noun rather than a purely insulting expression. Similarly, they note that the same phenomenon occurs with the word puto, which does not necessarily refer to the receiver's sexual orientation but is instead used as an attempt to offend the person with a word whose code is understood by both the sender and the receiver.

Language associated with the degradation of women is common in Spanish-language societies. In Mexican Spanish, for example, feminine terms are often used to denigrate men by associating femininity with traits such as cowardice. Examples include no seas nena and no seas niña, both meaning 'don't be a girl', used to vilify the receiver's masculinity.

=== Morphology ===
Puto and puta can be transformed into other words not always associated with sex, forming new adjectives and nouns, for example, emputarse ('to get angry'), putear ('to harass someone'; 'to insult someone'; 'to engage in prostitution'; or 'to have sex with prostitutes'), putazo ('a blast') or putero ('brothel'). As a prefix, puti– is used with sexual connotations as in putiflor ('promiscuous'), while puto– is used mostly as an intensifier, like in me putoencanta ('I fucking love it'). Further, the word puta serves as the basis for several idiomatic expressions, including de puta madre ('fucking great') or puta madre ('holy fuck'), while its masculine counterpart has only two uses, a puto el postre ('to hurry up and not be last') and ¡oxte, puto! (an idiom of Arabic origin meaning 'go away!'). Puto and puta can be censored with interjections including mta, puts, uts, p., uta, or poto.

== Use in popular culture ==
In 1997, Mexican rock band Molotov released their debut album ¿Dónde Jugarán las Niñas?, with the song "Puto" being selected as a single. According to the band members, the lyrics are directed at people they perceive as cowards, including the political class, rather than at the gay community. Gustavo Santaolalla, the album's producer, said that a "puto is someone who takes away your food [...] someone who abuses their power". However, the song remained controversial within the LGBTQ community because of the homophobic connotations of the word and other lyrics, including the phrase "matarile al maricón" (either 'kill the faggot' or 'kill the coward'). In Spain, the LGBTQ organization EHGAM argued that the song incited violence against LGBTQ people. In the United States, GLAAD requested Molotov not to perform the song while touring in the country. Academic Genaro Lozano argues that interpreting puto as a synonym for "coward" serves as a form of pseudo-shielding that obscures the word's primary meaning as a homophobic slur. According to him, the insult is rooted in stereotypes that portray gay men as effeminate, weak, and unmanly.

=== Use in association football ===
American football fans watching games in Monterrey, Mexico, began the tradition of shouting ¡eeeh, pum! during matches in the 1980s. The chant spread over the following decades, and in the 2000s, supporters of C.F. Monterrey adopted it in association football, shouting it to distract the opposing goalkeeper whenever he took a goal kick. The earliest recorded substitution of ¡eeeh, pum! with ¡eeeh, puto! occurred during a match at the 2004 CONCACAF Men's Pre-Olympic Tournament in Guadalajara, Mexico, after which the modified chant spread to other matches.

The chant's use began to draw international attention during FIFA World Cup matches. During the 2014 tournament, GLAAD sent an open letter, signed by 25 human rights organizations, to FIFA president Sepp Blatter expressing concern over FIFA's failure to take disciplinary action against the chant after he declined to do so. The letter also warned that, unless further action was taken, the organizations would pursue action involving FIFA's sponsors.

In 2016, FIFA began fining national football federations, including those of Mexico, Argentina, Peru, and Uruguay, for failing to take action to discourage fans from using the chant. By the 2018 FIFA World Cup, FIFA had intensified its disciplinary measures, including fining the Mexican Football Federation for the chant's use during the match against Germany.

The prohibition of the chant is disputed by many fans, who argue that the word is used as a synonym for "coward". Luis Fernando Lara, editor of the Diccionario del español de México, argued that the ban was motivated by political correctness rather than concerns about homophobia, stating: "It's an insult, yes, but it's not aimed at the gay community". However, critics contend that, regardless of its intended meaning in this context, puto's origins and historical usage are rooted in homophobic meanings. Mexico's National Council to Prevent Discrimination described the chant as far from innocent, stating that it echoed homophobia, machismo, and misogyny present in Mexican society.

Sports commentator Pali Plascencia wrote an op-ed for Excélsior. He argued that the chant is not used by fans as a homophobic expression but rather as a way of venting their frustration with the state of Mexican football. According to him, supporters use the chant to provoke sanctions against the Mexican Football Federation, thereby reducing its budget through fines. Similarly, writing in Frontiers: A Journal of Women Studies, Marie Sarita Gaytán and Matthew L. Basso argued that the chant functions as a "discursive weapon" employed by hegemonic men in a country whose conceptions of masculinity differ from those underlying many of its critics' perspectives.

=== Comedy ===
In the Philippines the word puto refers to a steamed rice cake. Comedians including Rex Navarrete and Jo Koy have made light of the slurs usage amongst Mexicans and its differing definition when used amongst Filipino.

== Reclamation ==
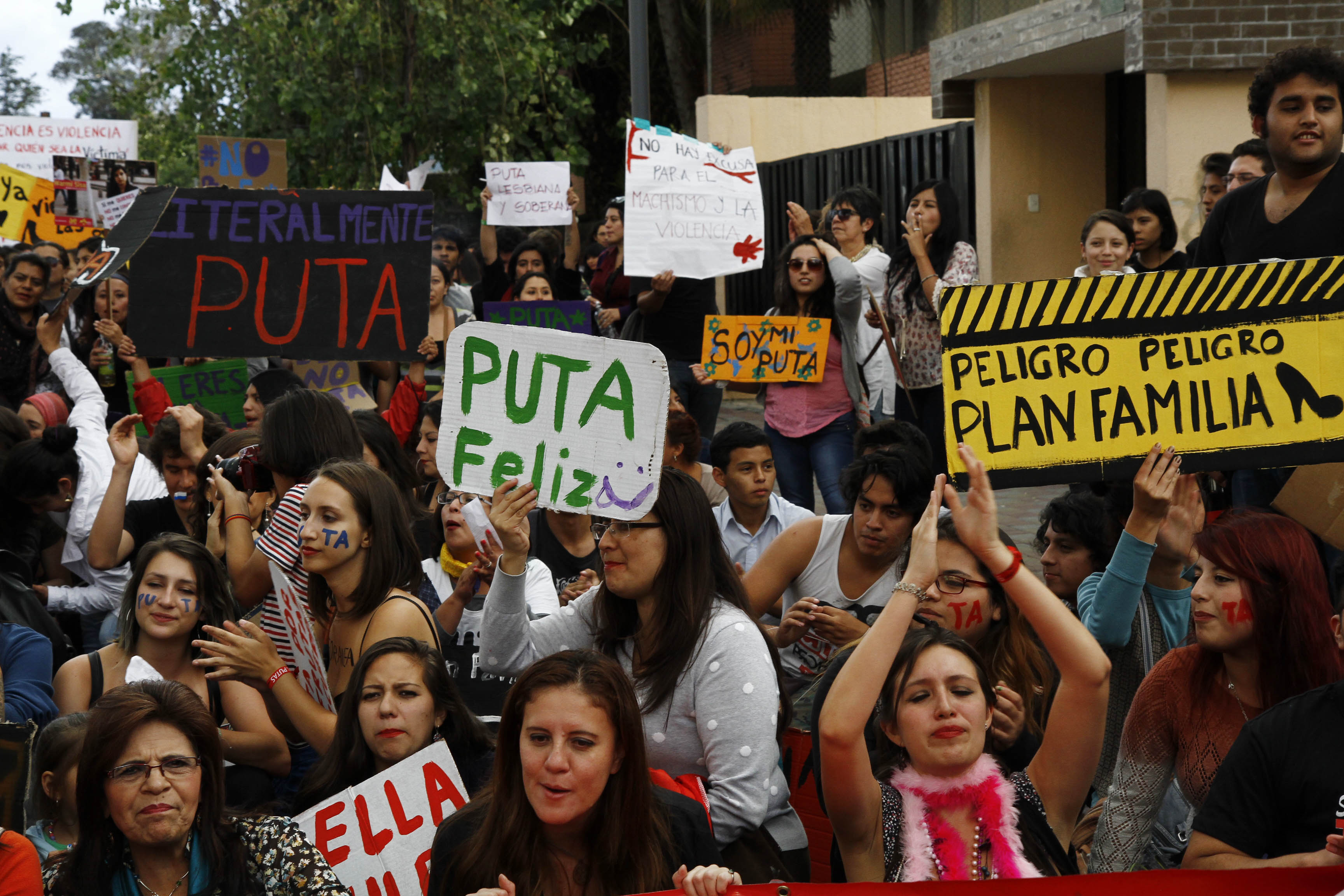
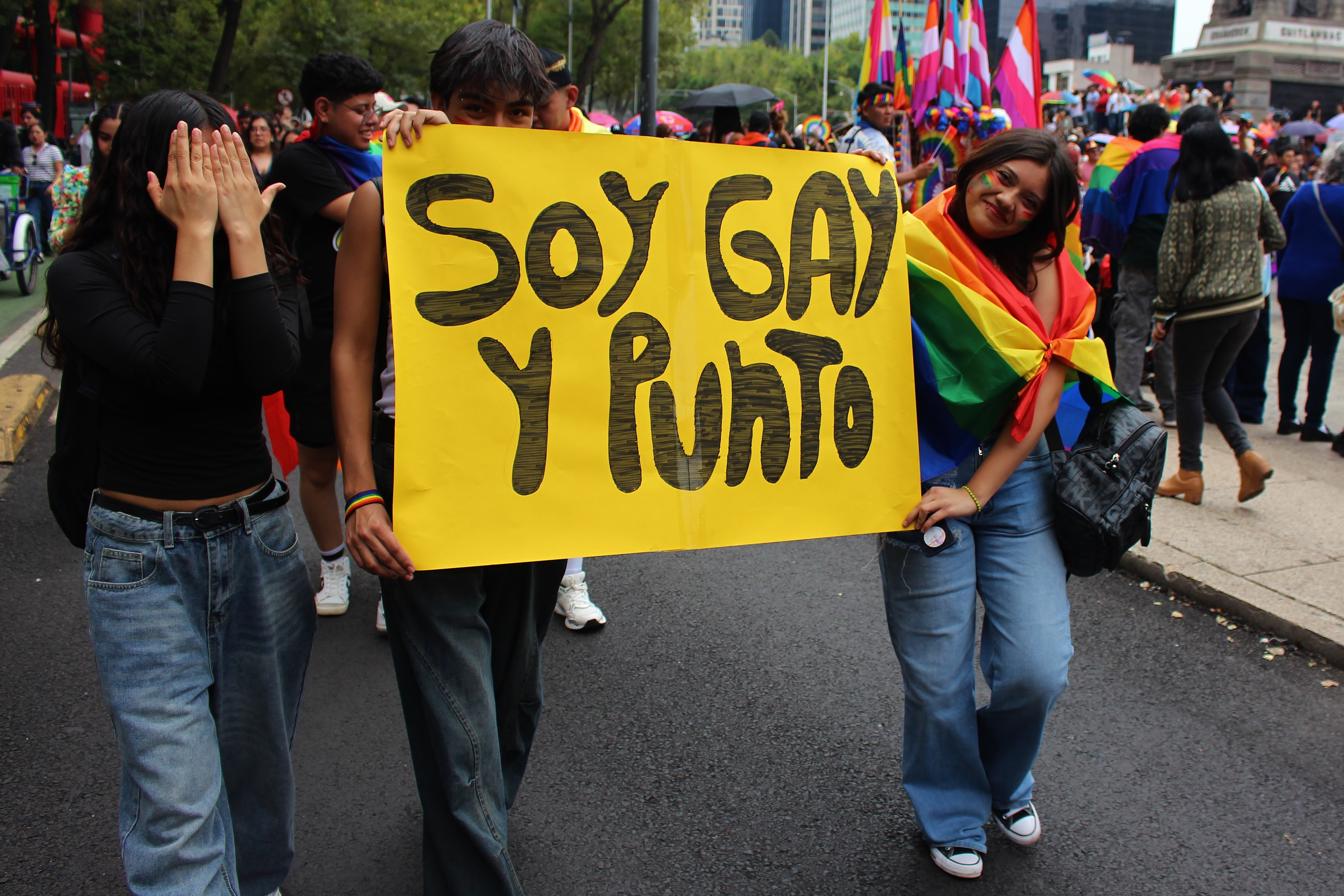
Women have organized demonstrations like the Marcha de las putas (left). Meanwhile, at Mexico City Pride parades, a wordplay banner is designed so that a person standing in front of the message "I'm gay, period" appears to be saying "I'm gay and puto" when photographed.

Some LGBTQ+ individuals have reclaimed the term puto, and some sex workers have done the same with puta.

Marico Carmona, a non-binary Argentine artist, argues that reclaiming homophobic slurs allows those targeted by them to transform words intended to cause harm into neutral or even positive forms of self-identification. However, Carmona also notes that not everyone is able or willing to reclaim such language.
